= 2000–01 National Division One =

01/02 English second tier rugby union season

- Countries: England
- Champions: Leeds Tykes
- Runners-up: Worcester
- Relegated: Orrell and Waterloo
- Attendance: 158,824 (average 908 per match) (Note: Note that 7 home attendances are missing (see below) - so the total attendance will not be 100% accurate. The average attendance has also been taken into account with the missing games not included.)
- Highest attendance: 5,509 – Leeds v Worcester, 1 April 2001
- Lowest attendance: 200 (x3) – Birmingham & Solihull (Note: Birmingham & Solihull achieved the lowest crowd of the season (200 supporters) 3 times; Waterloo, 14 October 2000, Moseley, 16 December 2001, Otley, 4 February 2001)
- Top point scorer: 396 – Sateki Tuipulotu (Worcester)
- Top try scorer: 19 – Graham Mackay (Leeds Tykes)

The 2001–02 National Division One (previously known as the Allied Dunbar Premiership Two and renamed as the Jewson National Division One for sponsorship reasons) was the fourteenth full season of rugby union within the second tier of the English league system, currently known as the RFU Championship. New teams to the division included Bedford Blues who had been relegated from the Allied Dunbar Premiership 1999-00 while Otley and Birmingham & Solihull had been promoted from National League Two. This season also saw the introduction of the bonus points scoring system. The season would also herald a new change in venue for Moseley who moved from their traditional home at The Reddings to share the University of Birmingham rugby pitch at Bournbrook, with The Reddings being sold to property developers in order to generate funds to keep the club in existence.

Leeds Tykes, the champions, were promoted to the Allied Dunbar Premiership for season 2001–02. There was only one promotion place available and the runners–up Worcester remained in National League 1 while Orrell and Waterloo were relegated to the 2001–02 National Division Two.

== Participating teams ==
Locations of the 2000–01 National Division One teams

Team	Stadium	Capacity	City/Area	Previous season
Bedford Blues	Goldington Road	5,000 (Note: Following their relegation from the Allied Dunbar Premiership, and looking at future season's capacity it is likely that Bedford's Goldington Road capacity was reduced from 6,500 to around 5,000 ahead of the 2000–01 season.)	Bedford, Bedfordshire	Relegated from Premiership 1 (12th)
Birmingham & Solihull	Sharmans Cross	4,000	Solihull, West Midlands	Promoted from National 1 (1st) (Note: Renaming of the leagues by the RFU ahead of the 2000–01 season meant that Birmingham & Solihull were promoted from National 1 (renamed to National 2) into a new National 1 (formerly known as Premiership 2).)
Coventry	Coundon Road	10,000 (1,100 seats)	Coventry, West Midlands	6th
Exeter Chiefs	County Ground	5,750 (750 seats)	Exeter, Devon	4th
Henley Hawks	Dry Leas	4,000	Henley-on-Thames, Oxfordshire	9th
Leeds Tykes	Headingley Stadium	22,250	Leeds, West Yorkshire	2nd
London Welsh	Old Deer Park	4,500 (1,500 seats)	Richmond, London	5th
Manchester	Grove Park	4,000	Cheadle Hulme, Greater Manchester	8th
Moseley	Bournbrook		Birmingham, West Midlands	7th
Orrell	Edge Hall Road	5,300 (300 seats)	Orrell, Greater Manchester	11th
Otley	Cross Green	7,000 (852 seats)	Otley, West Yorkshire	Promoted from National 1 (1st) (Note: Renaming of the leagues by the RFU ahead of the 2000–01 season meant that Otley were promoted from National 1 (renamed to National 2) into a new National 1 (formerly known as Premiership 2).)
Wakefield	College Grove	4,000 (500 seats)	Wakefield, West Yorkshire	10th
Waterloo	St Anthony's Road	9,950 (950 seats)	Blundellsands, Merseyside	12th
Worcester	Sixways	8,477	Worcester, Worcestershire	3rd

== Table ==
2000–01 National Division One table
Pos	Team	Pld	W	D	L	PF	PA	PD	TB	LB	Pts	Qualification
1	Leeds Tykes (C)	26	24	0	2	1032	407	+625	19	1	116	Promoted
2	Worcester	26	23	1	2	844	387	+457	17	1	112	
3	Exeter Chiefs	26	14	0	12	677	563	+114	9	6	71	
4	Wakefield	26	15	0	11	568	503	+65	7	3	70	
5	Coventry	26	14	0	12	565	604	−39	4	6	66	
6	London Welsh	26	13	0	13	525	616	−91	6	6	64	
7	Henley	26	12	2	12	517	589	−72	3	7	62	
8	Manchester	26	12	0	14	471	549	−78	1	4	53	
9	Birmingham & Solihull	26	7	5	14	427	481	−54	1	9	48	
10	Moseley	26	9	2	15	497	646	−149	3	4	47	
11	Bedford	26	9	1	16	463	616	−153	2	7	47	
12	Otley	26	9	1	16	455	630	−175	2	6	46	
13	Orrell	26	8	1	17	437	661	−224	2	10	46	Relegated
14	Waterloo	26	6	1	19	450	676	−226	3	6	35	Relegated

Source: rugbyarchive.net
Rules for classification: Points are awarded as follows: four points for a win; two points for a draw; no points for a loss; one bonus point for scoring four tries or more in a match; one bonus point for losing by seven points or less.
- If teams are level at any stage, tiebreakers are applied in the following order: (1) difference between points for and against; (2) total number of points for.
  (C) Champion

== Results ==
=== Round 1 ===
9 September 2000

Bedford Blues	31 - 34	Henley Hawks
	Report

Goldington Road
Attendance: 2,035
Referee: Roy Maybank

9 September 2000

Coventry	12 - 19	Exeter Chiefs
	Report

Coundon Road
Attendance: 1,000
Referee: Martin Fox

9 September 2000

Leeds Tykes	40 - 25	Birmingham & Solihull
	Report

Headingley
Attendance: 734
Referee: Steve Savage

9 September 2000

Manchester	26 - 18	London Welsh
	Report

Grove Park
Attendance: 785
Referee: David Grashoff

9 September 2000

Orrell	8 - 47	Worcester
	Report

Edge Hall Road
Attendance: 800
Referee: Tim Fisher

9 September 2000

Wakefield	22 - 33	Otley
	Report

College Grove
Attendance: 600
Referee: S Leyshon

9 September 2000

Waterloo	25 - 46	Moseley
	Report

St Antony's Road
Attendance: 375
Referee: Tim Miller

=== Round 2 ===
16 September 2000

Birmingham & Solihull	23 - 19	Manchester
	Report

Sharmans Cross
Attendance: 500
Referee: Eric Woodmason

16 September 2000

Exeter Chiefs	18 - 16	Wakefield
	Report

County Ground
Attendance: 987
Referee: David Sainsbury

16 September 2000

Henley Hawks	33 - 27	Coventry
	Report

Dry Leas
Attendance: 450
Referee: Nick Cousins

16 September 2000

London Welsh	14 - 20	Bedford Blues
	Report

Old Deer Park
Referee: Tim Miller

16 September 2000

Orrell	19 - 9	Moseley
	Report

Edge Hall Road
Attendance: 600
Referee: Roy Maybank

16 September 2000

Otley	16 - 15	Waterloo
	Report

Cross Green
Attendance: 500
Referee: Martin Fox

16 September 2000

Worcester	40 - 13	Leeds Tykes
	Report

Sixways
Attendance: 3,002
Referee: S Leyshon

=== Round 3 ===
23 September 2000

Bedford Blues	17 - 20	Birmingham & Solihull
	Report

Goldington Road
Attendance: 1,506
Referee: Tony Spreadbury

23 September 2000

Coventry	20 - 25	London Welsh
	Report

Coundon Road
Attendance: 1,500
Referee: Geraint Ashton-Jones

23 September 2000

Manchester	12 - 40	Worcester
	Report

Grove Park
Attendance: 895
Referee: Steve Savage

23 September 2000

Orrell	17 - 24	Leeds Tykes
	Report

Edge Hall Road
Attendance: 500
Referee: David Grashoff

23 September 2000

Otley	17 - 38	Moseley
	Report

Cross Green
Attendance: 450
Referee: Tim Fisher

23 September 2000

Wakefield	31 - 10	Henley Hawks
	Report

College Grove
Attendance: 400
Referee: S Terheege

23 September 2000

Waterloo	17 - 14	Exeter Chiefs
	Report

St Anthony's Road
Attendance: 300
Referee: David Pearson

=== Round 4 ===
30 September 2000

Birmingham & Solihull	16 - 17	Coventry
	Report

Sharmans Cross
Attendance: 500
Referee: David Sainsbury

30 September 2000

Exeter Chiefs	56 - 17	Otley
	Report

County Ground
Attendance: 834
Referee: Roy Maybank

30 September 2000

Henley Hawks	19 - 18	Waterloo
	Report

Dry Leas
Attendance: 450
Referee: Tony Spreadbury

30 September 2000

Leeds Tykes	19 - 16	Moseley
	Report

Headingley
Attendance: 950
Referee: David Pearson

30 September 2000

London Welsh	34 - 19	Wakefield
	Report

Old Deer Park
Attendance: 1,100
Referee: Martin Fox

30 September 2000

Orrell	21 - 6	Manchester
	Report

Edge Hall Road
Attendance: 650
Referee: Tim Miller

30 September 2000

Worcester	31 - 25	Bedford Blues
	Report

Sixways
Attendance: 2,700
Referee: Eric Woodmason

=== Round 5 ===
7 October 2000

Bedford Blues	27 - 0	Orrell
	Report

Goldington Road
Attendance: 1,175
Referee: Steve Savage

7 October 2000

Coventry	17 - 34	Worcester
	Report

Coundon Road
Attendance: 2,200
Referee: David Grashoff

7 October 2000

Manchester	9 - 21	Leeds Tykes
	Report

Grove Park
Attendance: 630
Referee: Tony Spreadbury

7 October 2000

Moseley	27 - 18	Exeter Chiefs
	Report

Bournbrook
Attendance: 1,102
Referee: Eric Woodmason

7 October 2000

Otley	16 - 10	Henley Hawks
	Report

Cross Green
Attendance: 400
Referee: Stuart Piercy

7 October 2000

Wakefield	11 - 0	Birmingham & Solihull
	Report

College Grove
Attendance: 300
Referee: Tim Miller

7 October 2000

Waterloo	25 - 18	London Welsh
	Report

St Anthony's Road
Attendance: 350
Referee: Trevor Fisher

=== Round 6 ===
14 October 2000

Birmingham & Solihull	33 - 12	Waterloo
	Report

Sharmans Cross
Attendance: 200
Referee: D May

14 October 2000

Henley Hwaks	32 - 24	Exeter Chiefs
	Report

Dry Leas
Attendance: 750
Referee: Chris Rees

14 October 2000

Leeds Tykes	42 - 6	Bedford Blues
	Report

Headingley
Attendance: 1,019
Referee: Geraint Ashton-Jones

14 October 2000

London Welsh	38 - 26	Otley
	Report

Old Deer Park
Attendance: 1,050
Referee: S Terheege

14 October 2000

Manchester	32 - 15	Moseley
	Report

Grove Park
Attendance: 650
Referee: Andrew Pearce

14 October 2000

Orrell	11 - 6	Coventry
	Report

Edge Hall Road
Attendance: 600
Referee: David Pearson

14 October 2000

Worcester	22 - 3	Wakefield
	Report

Sixways
Attendance: 1,870
Referee: Roy Maybank

=== Round 7 ===
28 October 2000

Bedford Blues	20 - 8	Manchester
	Report

Goldington Road
Attendance: 1,431
Referee: Tony Spreadbury

28 October 2000

Coventry	3 - 34	Leeds Tykes
	Report

Coundon Road
Attendance: 1,500
Referee: Wayne Erikkson

28 October 2000

Exeter Chiefs	18 - 24	London Welsh
	Report

County Ground
Attendance: 900
Referee: Steve Savage

28 October 2000

Moseley	16 - 12	Henley Hawks
	Report

Bournbrook
Attendance: 678
Referee: Tim Miller

28 October 2000

Otley	5 - 8	Birmingham & Solihull
	Report

Cross Green
Attendance: 400
Referee: David Grashoff

28 October 2000

Wakefield	20 - 13	Orrell
	Report

College Grove
Attendance: 400
Referee: Eric Woodmason

28 October 2000

Waterloo	19 - 32	Worcester
	Report

St Anthony's Road
Attendance: 500
Referee: Martin Fox

=== Round 8 ===
18 November 2000

London Welsh	20 - 15	Henley Hawks
	Report

Old Deer Park
Attendance: 550
Referee: David Pearson

18 November 2000

Orrell	35 - 11	Waterloo
	Report

Edge Hall Road
Attendance: 400
Referee: David Grashoff

19 November 2000

Bedford Blues	28 - 14	Moseley
	Report

Goldington Road
Attendance: 1,430
Referee: Nick Cousins

19 November 2000

Birmingham & Solihull	27 - 21	Exeter Chiefs
	Report

Sharmans Cross
Attendance: 250
Referee: Martin Fox

19 November 2000

Leeds Tykes	32 - 21	Wakefield
	Report

Headingley
Attendance: 1,318
Referee: Tim Miller

19 November 2000

Manchester	20 - 28	Coventry
	Report

Grove Park
Attendance: 625
Referee: Eric Woodmason

19 November 2000

Worcester	37 - 12	Otley
	Report

Sixways
Attendance: 1,600
Referee: Andrew Pearce

=== Round 9 ===
25 November 2000

Exeter Chiefs	P - P	Leeds Tykes

- Postponed. Game rescheduled to 18 April 2001.

25 November 2000

Henley Hawks	23 - 15	Orrell
	Report

Dry Leas
Attendance: 500
Referee: David Pearson

25 November 2000

London Welsh	12 - 29	Worcester
	Report

Old Deer Park
Attendance: 700
Referee: Trevor Fisher

25 November 2000

Moseley	13 - 14	Birmingham & Solihull
	Report

Bournbrook
Attendance: 638
Referee: Tony Spreadbury

25 November 2000

Otley	14 - 18	Manchester
	Report

Cross Green
Attendance: 400
Referee: Robin Goodliffe

25 November 2000

Wakefield	24 - 18	Coventry
	Report

College Grove
Attendance: 250
Referee: S Terheege

25 November 2000

Waterloo	11 - 20	Bedford Blues
	Report

St Anthony's Road
Attendance: 450
Referee: Steve Savage

=== Round 10 ===
2 December 2000

Bedford Blues	16 - 15	Otley
	Report

Goldington Road
Attendance: 1,100
Referee: Eric Woodmason

2 December 2000

Coventry	20 - 13	Waterloo
	Report

Coundon Road
Attendance: 1,100
Referee: David Pearson

2 December 2000

Leeds Tykes	43 - 7	Henley Hawks
	Report

Headingley
Attendance: 306
Referee: J Barnard

2 December 2000

London Welsh	33 - 32	Orrell
	Report

Old Deer Park
Attendance: 550
Referee: Andrew Pearce

2 December 2000

Manchester	21 - 3	Exeter Chiefs
	Report

Grove Park
Attendance: 600
Referee: David Grashoff

2 December 2000

Wakefield	22 - 19	Moseley
	Report

College Grove
Attendance: 300
Referee: Martin Fox

3 December 2000

Worcester	21 - 16	Birmingham & Solihull
	Report

Sixways
Attendance: 1,900
Referee: Steve Leyshon

=== Round 11 ===
9 December 2000

Birmingham & Solihull	P - P	Orrell

- Postponed. Game rescheduled to 3 March 2001.

9 December 2000

Exeter Chiefs	P - P	Bedford Blues

- Postponed. Game rescheduled to 3 March 2001.

9 December 2000

Henley Hawks	13 - 26	Manchester
	Report

Dry Leas
Attendance: 550
Referee: Tony Spreadbury

9 December 2000

London Welsh	12 - 35	Leeds Tykes
	Report

Old Deer Park
Attendance: 800
Referee: Nigel Yates

9 December 2000

Moseley	22 - 15	Worcester
	Report

Bournbrook
Attendance: 824
Referee: Robin Goodliffe

9 December 2000

Otley	19 - 24	Coventry
	Report

Cross Green
Attendance: 450
Referee: Martin Fox

9 December 2000

Waterloo	P - P	Wakefield

- Postponed. Game rescheduled to 17 February 2001.

=== Round 12 ===
16 December 2001

Bedford Blues	37 - 9	Waterloo
	Report

Goldington Road
Attendance: 1,870
Referee: Tim Miller

16 December 2001

Birmingham & Solihull	20 - 20	Moseley
	Report

Sharmans Cross
Attendance: 200
Referee: David Grashoff

16 December 2001

Coventry	25 - 9	Wakefield
	Report

Coundon Road
Attendance: 2,000
Referee: Trevor Fisher

16 December 2001

Leeds Tykes	63 - 13	Exeter Chiefs
	Report

Headingley
Attendance: 657
Referee: Martin Fox

16 December 2001

Manchester	21 - 17	Otley
	Report

College Grove
Attendance: 400
Referee: Roy Maybank

16 December 2001

Orrell	17 - 22	Henley Hawks
	Report

Edge Hall Road
Attendance: 500
Referee: Eric Woodmason

16 December 2001

Worcester	51 - 3	London Welsh
	Report

Sixways
Attendance: 2,002
Referee: S Terheege

=== Round 13 ===
30 December 2000

Exeter Chiefs	P - P	Orrell

- Postponed. Game rescheduled to 17 February 2001.

30 December 2000

Henley Hawks	P - P	Worcester Warriors

- Postponed. Game rescheduled to 18 February 2001.

30 December 2000

London Welsh	P - P	Birmingham & Solihull

- Postponed. Game rescheduled to 18 February 2001.

30 December 2000

Moseley	P - P	Coventry

- Postponed. Game rescheduled to 18 February 2001.

30 December 2000

Otley	P - P	Leeds Tykes

- Postponed. Game rescheduled to 17 February 2001.

30 December 2000

Wakefield	P - P	Bedford Blues

- Postponed. Game rescheduled to 24 March 2001.

30 December 2000

Waterloo	P - P	Manchester

- Postponed. Game rescheduled to 3 March 2001.

=== Round 14 ===
6 January 2001

Bedford Blues	15 - 20	Coventry
	Report

Goldington Road
Attendance: 2,190
Referee: Geraint Ashton-Jones

6 January 2001

Birmingham & Solihull	16 - 6	Henley Hawks
	Report

Sharmans Cross
Attendance: 450
Referee: Tim Miller

6 January 2001

Leeds Tykes	45 - 0	Waterloo
	Report

Headingley
Attendance: 360
Referee: Nigel Yates

6 January 2001

London Welsh	34 - 6	Moseley
	Report

Old Deer Park
Attendance: 1,150
Referee: David Sainsbury

6 January 2001

Manchester	28 - 29	Wakefield
	Report

Grove Park
Attendance: 520
Referee: S Leyshon

6 January 2001

Orrell	20 - 23	Otley
	Report

Edge Hall Road
Attendance: 300
Referee: J Barnard

6 January 2001

Worcester	25 - 6	Exeter Chiefs
	Report

Sixways
Attendance: 2,198
Referee: Chris Rees

=== Round 15 ===
13 January 2001

Coventry	18 - 10	Manchester
	Report

Coundon Road
Attendance: 1,256
Referee: Ed Morrison

13 January 2001

Exeter Chiefs	22 - 6	Birmingham & Solihull
	Report

County Ground
Attendance: 1,050
Referee: Eric Woodmason

13 January 2001

Henley Hawks	30 - 12	London Welsh
	Report

Dry Leas
Attendance: 1,150
Referee: Stuart Piercy

13 January 2001

Moseley	24 - 17	Bedford Blues
	Report

Bournbrook
Attendance: 874
Referee: Nick Cousins

13 January 2001

Otley	19 - 31	Worcester
	Report

Cross Green
Attendance: 500
Referee: David Pearson

13 January 2001

Wakefield	25 - 38	Leeds Tykes
	Report

College Grove
Attendance: 600
Referee: Martin Fox

13 January 2001

Waterloo	35 - 16	Orrell
	Report

St Anthony's Road
Attendance: 450
Referee: Tony Spreadbury

=== Round 16 ===
20 January 2001

Bedford Blues	P - P	Wakefield

- Postponed. Game rescheduled to 8 April 2001.

20 January 2001

Birmingham & Solihull	P - P	London Welsh

- Postponed. Game rescheduled to 7 April 2001.

20 January 2001

Coventry	54 - 7	Moseley
	Report

Coundon Road
Attendance: 3,185
Referee: Tim Miller

20 January 2001

Leeds Tykes	43 - 22	Otley
	Report

Headingley
Attendance: 1,341
Referee: Steve Lander

20 January 2001

Manchester	P - P	Waterloo

- Postponed. Game rescheduled to 24 March 2001.

20 January 2001

Orrell	P - P	Exeter Chiefs

- Postponed. Game rescheduled to 24 March 2001.

20 January 2001

Worcester	56 - 18	Henley Hawks
	Report

Sixways
Attendance: 2,003
Referee: Ed Morrison

=== Round 17 ===
27 January 2001

Coventry	39 - 22	Bedford Blues
	Report

Coundon Road
Attendance: 2,200
Referee: Nigel Yates

27 January 2001

Exeter Chiefs	22 - 29	Worcester
	Report

County Ground
Attendance: 1,200
Referee: Eric Woodmason

27 January 2001

Henley Hawks	18 - 18	Birmingham & Solihull
	Report

Dry Leas
Attendance: 520
Referee: Andrew Pearce

27 January 2001

Moseley	17 - 32	London Welsh
	Report

Bournbrook
Attendance: 776
Referee: David Pearson

27 January 2001

Otley	24 - 22	Orrell
	Report

Cross Green
Attendance: 450
Referee: Martin Fox

27 January 2001

Wakefield	21 - 18	Manchester
	Report

College Grove
Attendance: 300
Referee: David Grashoff

27 January 2001

Waterloo	17 - 45	Leeds Tykes
	Report

St Anthony's Road
Attendance: 320
Referee: S Leyshon

=== Round 18 ===
3 February 2001

Henley Hawks	P - P	Moseley

- Postponed. Game rescheduled to 8 April 2001.

3 February 2001

Orrell	16 - 10	Wakefield
	Report

Edge Hall Road
Attendance: 600
Referee: Geraint Ashton-Jones

4 February 2001

Birmingham & Solihull	10 - 13	Otley
	Report

Sharmans Cross
Attendance: 200
Referee: Roy Maybank

4 February 2001

Leeds Tykes	P - P	Coventry

- Postponed. Game rescheduled to 4 March 2001.

4 February 2001

London Welsh	24 - 15	Exeter Chiefs
	Report

Old Deer Park
Attendance: 530
Referee: David Grashoff

4 February 2001

Manchester	22 - 13	Bedford Blues
	Report

Grove Park
Attendance: 485
Referee: Andrew Pearce

4 February 2001

Worcester	30 - 18	Waterloo
	Report

Sixways
Attendance: 1,988
Referee: Robin Goodliffe

=== Round 19 ===
10 February 2001

Bedford Blues	3 - 48	Leeds Tykes
	Report

Goldington Road
Attendance: 1,225
Referee: Roy Maybank

10 February 2001

Coventry	19 - 8	Orrell
	Report

Coundon Road
Attendance: 1,525

10 February 2001

Exeter Chiefs	P - P	Henley Hawks

- Postponed. Game rescheduled to 25 April 2001.

10 February 2001

Moseley	6 - 16	Manchester
	Report

Bournbrook
Attendance: 479
Referee: S Terheege

10 February 2001

Otley	7 - 0	London Welsh
	Report

Cross Green
Attendance: 400
Referee: Nigel Yates

10 February 2001

Wakefield	5 - 23	Worcester
	Report

College Grove
Attendance: 300
Referee: Tim Fisher

10 February 2001

Waterloo	12 - 9	Birmingham & Solihull
	Report

St Anthony's Road
Attendance: 260
Referee: David Pearson

=== Round 11 & 13 (rescheduled games) ===
17 February 2001

Exeter Chiefs	48 - 11	Orrell
	Report

County Ground
Attendance: 538
Referee: Ed Morrison

- Game rescheduled from 30 December 2000.

17 February 2001

Otley	14 - 40	Leeds Tykes
	Report

Cross Green
Attendance: 850
Referee: Tim Miller

- Game rescheduled from 30 December 2000.

17 February 2001

Waterloo	16 - 17	Wakefield
	Report

St Anthony's Road
Attendance: 250
Referee: Tony Spreadbury

- Game rescheduled from 9 December 2000.

18 February 2001

Henley Hawks	13 - 16	Worcester
	Report

Dry Leas
Attendance: 705
Referee: David Grashoff

- Game rescheduled from 30 December 2000.

18 February 2001

London Welsh	P - P	Birmingham & Solihull

- Game originally rescheduled from 30 December 2000 but postponed once again. Game rescheduled to 24 March 2001.

18 February 2001

Moseley	25 - 20	Coventry
	Report

Bournbrook
Attendance: 880
Referee: S Leyshon

- Game rescheduled from 30 December 2000.

=== Round 20 ===
24 February 2001

Birmingham & Solihull	22 - 32	Wakefield
	Report

Sharmans Cross
Attendance: 240
Referee: David Sainsbury

24 February 2001

Exeter Chiefs	24 - 19	Moseley
	Report

County Ground
Attendance: 900
Referee: Roy Maybank

24 February 2001

Henley Hawks	20 - 23	Otley
	Report

Dry Leas
Attendance: 535
Referee: Eric Woodmason

24 February 2001

Leeds Tykes	46 - 13	Manchester
	Report

Headingley
Attendance: 407
Referee: Stuart Piercy

24 February 2001

London Welsh	31 - 16	Waterloo
	Report

Old Deer Park
Attendance: 700
Referee: Geraint Ashton-Jones

24 February 2001

Orrell	15 - 14	Bedford Blues
	Report

Edge Hall Road
Attendance: 400
Referee: Mike Hamlin

24 February 2001

Worcester	27 - 16	Coventry
	Report

Sixways
Attendance: 3,065
Referee: Ashley Rowden

=== Rounds 11, 13 & 18 (Rescheduled games) ===
3 March 2001

Birmingham & Solihull	15 - 15	Orrell
	Report

Sharmans Cross
Attendance: 300
Referee: S Terheege

- Game rescheduled from 9 December 2000.

3 March 2001

Exeter Chiefs	39 - 13	Bedford Blues
	Report

County Ground
Attendance: 670
Referee: S Leyshon

- Game rescheduled from 9 December 2000.

3 March 2001

Waterloo	14 - 16	Manchester
	Report

St Anthony's Road
Referee: Steve Savage

- Game rescheduled from 30 December 2000.

4 March 2001

Leeds Tykes	68 - 8	Coventry
	Report

Headingley
Attendance: 512
Referee: Tony Spreadbury

- Game rescheduled from 3 February 2001.

=== Round 21 ===
10 March 2001

Bedford Blues	14 - 32	Worcester
	Report

Goldington Road
Attendance: 1,880
Referee: Chris White

10 March 2001

Coventry	23 - 18	Birmingham & Solihull
	Report

Coundon Road
Attendance: 2,200

10 March 2001

Manchester	8 - 3	Orrell
	Report

Grove Park
Attendance: 942
Referee: Roy Maybank

10 March 2001

Moseley	23 - 50	Leeds Tykes
	Report

Bournbrook
Attendance: 723
Referee: Nigel Yates

10 March 2001

Wakefield	38 - 15	London Welsh
	Report

College Grove
Attendance: 300
Referee: David Pearson

10 March 2001

Waterloo	17 - 29	Henley Hawks
	Report

St Anthony's Road
Attendance: 265
Referee: Nick Cousins

11 March 2001

Otley	22 - 31	Exeter Chiefs
	Report

Cross Green
Attendance: 600
Referee: Geraint Ashton-Jones

=== Round 22 ===
17 March 2001

Birmingham & Solihull	P - P	Bedford Blues

- Postponed. Game rescheduled to 25 April 2001.

17 March 2001

Exeter Chiefs	29 - 10	Waterloo
	Report

County Ground
Attendance: 780
Referee: Eric Woodmason

17 March 2001

Henley Hawks	24 - 7	Wakefield
	Report

Dry Leas
Attendance: 310
Referee: Tim Miller

17 March 2001

Leeds Tykes	81 - 20	Orrell
	Report

Headingley
Attendance: 480
Referee: David Sainsbury

17 March 2001

London Welsh	14 - 20	Coventry
	Report

Old Deer Park
Attendance: 700
Referee: S Terheege

17 March 2001

Moseley	P - P	Otley

- Postponed. Game rescheduled to 24 March 2001.

17 March 2001

Worcester	27-8	Manchester
	Report

Sixways
Attendance: 2,108
Referee: Nick Cousins

=== Rounds 13, 16 (Rescheduled games) ===
24 March 2001

London Welsh	11 - 7	Birmingham & Solihull
	Report

Old Deer Park
Attendance: 600
Referee: Trevor Fisher

- Game rescheduled from 18 February 2001 after having been originally rescheduled from 30 December 2000.

24 March 2001

Manchester	10 - 23	Waterloo
	Report

Grove Park
Attendance: 325
Referee: Steve Lander

- Game rescheduled from 20 January 2001.

24 March 2001

Moseley	20 - 15	Otley
	Report

Bournbrook
Attendance: 462
Referee: Tony Spreadbury

- Game rescheduled from 17 March 2001.

24 March 2001

Orrell	32 - 34	Exeter Chiefs
	Report

Edge Hall Road
Attendance: 350
Referee: Chris White

- Game rescheduled from 20 January 2001.

24 March 2001

Wakefield	21 - 20	Bedford Blues
	Report

College Grove
Referee: Ed Morrison

- Game rescheduled from 30 December 2000.

=== Round 23 ===
31 March 2001

Bedford Blues	23 - 18	London Welsh
	Report

Goldington Road
Attendance: 1,608
Referee: Tim Miller

31 March 2001

Coventry	25 - 18	Henley Hawks
	Report

Coundon Road
Attendance: 1,800
Referee: Geraint Ashton-Jones

31 March 2001

Manchester	14 - 13	Birmingham & Solihull
	Report

Grove Park
Attendance: 385
Referee: Steve Savage

31 March 2001

Moseley	20 - 15	Orrell
	Report

Bournbrook
Attendance: 571
Referee: David Pearson

31 March 2001

Wakefield	21 - 20	Exeter Chiefs
	Report

College Grove
Attendance: 300
Referee: J Barnard

31 March 2001

Waterloo	15 - 19	Otley
	Report

St Anthony's Road
Attendance: 301
Referee: Stuart Piercy

1 April 2001

Leeds Tykes	30 - 13	Worcester
	Report

Headingley
Attendance: 5,509
Referee: Ed Morrison

=== Round 16 & 18 (Rescheduled games) ===
7 April 2001

Birmingham & Solihull	13 - 14	London Welsh
	Report

Sharmans Cross
Attendance: 400
Referee: Roy Maybank

- Game rescheduled from 20 January 2001.

8 April 2001

Bedford Blues	19 - 18	Wakefield
	Report

Goldington Road
Attendance: 1,320
Referee: Nick Cousins

- Game rescheduled from 20 January 2001.

8 April 2001

Henley Hawks	20 - 12	Moseley
	Report

Dry Leas
Attendance: 545
Referee: Tim Fisher

- Game rescheduled from 3 February 2001.

=== Round 24 ===
14 April 2001

Birmingham & Solihull	20 - 31	Leeds Tykes
	Report

Sharmans Cross
Attendance: 300
Referee: David Grashoff

14 April 2001

Exeter Chiefs	48 - 22	Coventry
	Report

County Ground
Attendance: 989
Referee: R Glynne Jones

14 April 2001

Henley Hawks	18 - 10	Bedford Blues
	Report

Dry Leas
Attendance: 1,010
Referee: David Pearson

14 April 2001

London Welsh	31 - 30	Manchester
	Report

Old Deer Park
Attendance: 900
Referee: Ashley Rowden

14 April 2001

Moseley	29 - 29	Waterloo
	Report

Bournbrook
Attendance: 475
Referee: Geraint Ashton-Jones

14 April 2001

Otley	3 - 20	Wakefield
	Report

Cross Green
Attendance: 550
Referee: Roy Maybank

14 April 2001

Worcester	67 - 13	Orrell
	Report

Sixways
Attendance: 2,071
Referee: David Sainsbury

=== Round 9 (Rescheduled game) ===
18 April 2001

Exeter Chiefs	26 - 33	Leeds Tykes
	Report

County Ground
Attendance: 1,021
Referee: Ashley Rowden

- Game rescheduled from 25 November 2000.

=== Round 25 ===
21 April 2001

Bedford Blues	11-33	Exeter Chiefs
	Report

Goldington Road
Attendance: 1,720
Referee: Tony Spreadbury

21 April 2001

Coventry	38-27	Otley
	Report

Coundon Road
Attendance: 1,800
Referee: Tim Miller

21 April 2001

Leeds Tykes	55-16	London Welsh
	Report

Headingley
Attendance: 1,254

21 April 2001

Manchester	39-37	Henley Hawks
	Report

Grove Park
Attendance: 865
Referee: Robin Goodliffe

21 April 2001

Orrell	20-13	Birmingham & Solihull
	Report

Edge Hall Road
Attendance: 400
Referee: J Barnard

21 April 2001

Wakefield	35-13	Waterloo
	Report

College Grove
Attendance: 250
Referee: R Glynne Jones

21 April 2001

Worcester	43-17	Moseley
	Report

Sixways
Attendance: 2,500

=== Round 19 & 22 (Rescheduled games) ===
25 April 2001

Birmingham & Solihull	19 - 18	Bedford Blues
	Report

Sharmans Cross
Referee: Geraint Ashton-Jones

- Game rescheduled from 17 March 2001.

25 April 2001

Exeter Chiefs	41 - 8	Henley Hawks
	Report

County Ground
Referee: Martin Fox

- Game rescheduled from 10 February 2001.

=== Round 26 ===
28 April 2001

Birmingham & Solihull	26 - 26	Worcester
	Report

Sharmans Cross
Referee: Ashley Rowden

28 April 2001

Exeter Chiefs	35 - 21	Manchester
	Report

County Ground
Attendance: 1,250

28 April 2001

Henley Hawks	18 - 13	Leeds Tykes
	Report

Dry Leas
Attendance: 820

28 April 2001

Moseley	17 - 36	Wakefield
	Report

Bournbrook
Attendance: 500

28 April 2001

Orrell	23 - 22	London Welsh
	Report

Edge Hall Road
Attendance: 800

28 April 2001

Otley	17 - 17	Bedford Blues
	Report

Cross Green
Attendance: 800

28 April 2001

Waterloo	40 - 26	Coventry
	Report

St Anthony's Road
Referee: David Sainsbury

== Total Season Attendances ==
Club	Home Games	Total	Average	Highest	Lowest	% Capacity
Bedford Blues	13	20,490	1,576	2,190	1,100	32%
Birmingham & Solihull	11 (Note: Missing home attendances Bedford Blues on 25 April 2001 and Worcester on 28 April 2001.)	3,540	322	500	200	8%
Coventry	13	23,266	1,790	3,185	1,000	18%
Exeter Chiefs	12 (Note: Missing home attendance v Henley Hawks on 25 April 2001.)	11,119	927	1,250	538	16%
Henley Hawks	13	8,295	638	1,150	310	16%
Leeds Tykes	13	14,847	1,142	5,509	306	5%
London Welsh	12 (Note: Missing home attendance v Bedford Blues on 16 September 2000.)	9,330	778	1,150	530	17%
Manchester	13	8,107	624	942	325	16%
Moseley	13	8,982	691	1,102	462	N/A
Orrell	13	6,900	531	800	300	10%
Otley	13	6,700	515	850	400	7%
Wakefield	12 (Note: Missing home attendance v Bedford Blues on 24 March 2001.)	4,420	368	600	250	9%
Waterloo	11 (Note: Missing home attendances v Manchester on 3 March 2001 and Coventry on 28 April 2001.)	3,821	347	500	250	3%
Worcester	13	29,007	2,231	3,065	1,600	26%

== Individual statistics ==
- Note that points scorers includes tries as well as conversions, penalties and drop goals.

=== Top points scorers ===
Rank	Player	Team	Appearances	Points
1	(Tonga) Sateki Tuipulotu	Worcester	25	396
2	(New Zealand) Richard Le Bas	Leeds Tykes	25	364
3	(England) Martyn Davies	Coventry	22	278
4	(England) Phillip Belgian	Waterloo	24	241
5	(England) Andy Lee	London Welsh	22	226
6	(England) Steve Gough	Birmingham & Solihull	19	224
7	(England) Matt Jones	Henley Hawks	25	214
8	(England) Ben Harvey	Moseley	18	203
9	(England) David Sleman	Orrell	25	200
10	(England) Stephen Swindells	Manchester	13	199

=== Top try scorers ===
Rank	Player	Team	Appearances	Tries
1	(Australia) Graham Mackay	Leeds Tykes	20	19
2	(England) Shaun Woof	Leeds Tykes	25	18
3	(England) Matt Vines	London Welsh	21	17
3	(England) Chris Hall	Leeds Tykes	23	17
3	(Tonga) Sateki Tuipulotu	Worcester	25	17
4	(England) Kurt Johnson	Coventry	23	14
5	(England) Alastair Murdoch	Worcester	25	13
5	(England) Scott Benton	Leeds Tykes	26	13
6	(England) Nick Baxter	Worcester	12	10
6	(England) Carl Houston	Wakefield	19	10

== Season records ==
=== Team ===
Largest home win — 61 pts

81 - 20 Leeds Tykes at home to Orrell on 17 March 2001

Largest away win — 45 pts

48 - 3 Leeds Tykes away to Bedford Blues on 10 February 2001

Most points scored — 81 pts

81 - 20 Leeds Tykes at home to Orrell on 17 March 2001

Most tries in a match — 12

Leeds Tykes at home to Coventry on 4 March 2001

Most conversions in a match — 9

Leeds Tykes at home to Orrell on 17 March 2001

Most penalties in a match — 8

Orrell at home to Moseley on 16 September 2000

Most drop goals in a match — 2 (x4)

Bedford Blues at home to Henley Hawks on 9 September 2000
Exeter Chiefs at home to Wakefield on 16 September 2000
Otley away to London Welsh on 14 October 2000
Orrell at home to Wakefield on 3 February 2001

=== Player ===
Most points in a match — 31 (x2)

(New Zealand) Richard Le Bas for Leeds Tykes at home to Wakefield on 19 November 2000
(Tonga) Sateki Tuipulotu for Worcester at home to Henley Hawks on 20 January 2001

Most tries in a match — 3 (x15)

N/A - multiple players

Most conversions in a match — 9

(New Zealand) Richard Le Bas for Leeds Tykes at home to Wakefield on 19 November 2000

Most penalties in a match — 8

(England) David Sleman for Orrell at home to Moseley on 16 September 2000

Most drop goals in a match — 2 (x4)

(England) James Shanahan for Bedford Blues at home to Henley Hawks on 9 September 2000
(England) Sam Howard for Exeter Chiefs at home to Wakefield on 16 September 2000
(England) Dan Clappison for Otley away to London Welsh on 14 October 2000
(England) David Sleman for Orrell at home to Wakefield on 3 February 2001

=== Attendances ===
Highest — 5,509

Leeds Tykes at home to Worcester on 1 April 2001

Lowest — 200 (x3)

Birmingham & Solihull at home to Waterloo on 14 October 2000, Moseley on 16 December 2001 & Otley on 4 February 2001

Highest Average Attendance — 2,231

Worcester

Lowest Average Attendance — 322 (Note: Birmingham & Solihull are missing 2 home attendances so this figure is not 100% accurate.)

Birmingham & Solihull

== See also ==
- 2000–01 Premiership Rugby
- 2000–01 National Division Two
- 2000–01 National Division Three North
- 2000–01 National Division Three South
