= 1999–00 Premiership 2 =

Rugby union competition in England

- Countries: England
- Champions: Rotherham
- Runners-up: Leeds Tykes
- Relegated: Rugby and West Hartlepool
- Attendance: 90,201 (average 1,219 per match) (Note: Note that 108 home attendances are missing (see below) - so the total attendance will not be 100% accurate. The average attendance has also been taken into account with the missing games not included.)
- Highest attendance: 5,019 Leeds Tykes at home to Rotherham on 18 February 2000
- Lowest attendance: 300 (x3) (Note: 3 teams achieved the lowest home attendance of 300 spectators; Waterloo at home to London Welsh on 19 February 2000, West Hartlepool at home to Orrell on 18 March 2000 & Exeter Chiefs on 1 May 2000.)
- Top point scorer: 312 – Sam Howard (Worcester)
- Top try scorer: 18 – Dean Lax (Rotherham)

The 1999-00 Premiership 2 was the thirteenth full season of rugby union within the second tier of the English league system, currently known as the RFU Championship. Allied Dunbar sponsored the top two divisions of the English rugby union leagues for the third season in a row. The leagues were previously known as the Courage Clubs Championship and sponsored by Courage Brewery. New teams to the division included West Hartlepool who had been relegated from Premiership 1 while Henley Hawks and Manchester had been promoted from National League 1. Exeter were also rebranded as the 'Chiefs' from this season onward.

Rotherham, the champions, were promoted to the Allied Dunbar Premiership for season 2000–01 after beating the 12th placed team from that division, (Bedford), in a two legged play–off. There was only one promotion place available and the runners–up Leeds Tykes remained in Premiership 2 for the following season. Rugby and West Hartlepool were relegated to the 2000–01 National Division Two.

== Participating teams ==
Locations of the 1999-00 Premiership 2 teams

Team	Stadium	Capacity	City/Area	Previous season
Coventry	Coundon Road	10,000 (1,100 seats)	Coventry, West Midlands	7th
Exeter Chiefs	County Ground	5,750 (750 seats)	Exeter, Devon	5th
Henley	Dry Leas	4,000	Henley-on-Thames, Oxfordshire	Promoted from National 1 (1st)
Leeds Tykes	Headingley Stadium	22,250	Leeds, West Yorkshire	6th
London Welsh	Old Deer Park	4,500 (1,500 seats)	Richmond, London	4th
Manchester	Grove Park	4,000	Cheadle Hulme, Greater Manchester	Promoted from National 1 (2nd)
Moseley	The Reddings	9,999 (1,800 seats)	Birmingham, West Midlands	10th
Orrell	Edge Hall Road	5,300 (300 seats)	Orrell, Greater Manchester	8th
Rotherham	Clifton Lane	2,500	Rotherham, South Yorkshire	2nd
Rugby Lions	Webb Ellis Road	3,200 (200 seats)	Rugby, Warwickshire	11th
Wakefield	College Grove	4,000 (500 seats)	Wakefield, West Yorkshire	12th
Waterloo	St Anthony's Road	9,950 (950 seats)	Blundellsands, Merseyside	9th
West Hartlepool	Victoria Park	7,856	Hartlepool, County Durham	Relegated from Premiership 1 (14th)
Worcester	Sixways	8,477	Worcester, Worcestershire	3rd

== Table ==
1999–00 Premiership 2table
Pos	Team	Pld	W	D	L	PF	PA	PD	Pts	Qualification
1	Rotherham	26	24	0	2	1045	267	+778	48	Promoted
2	Leeds Tykes	26	22	0	4	794	269	+525	44	
3	Worcester	26	19	0	7	865	450	+415	38	
4	Exeter Chiefs	26	19	0	7	742	466	+276	38	
5	London Welsh	26	16	0	10	713	476	+237	32	
6	Coventry	26	15	0	11	714	589	+125	30	
7	Moseley	26	14	0	12	595	526	+69	28	
8	Manchester	26	11	0	15	513	672	−159	22	
9	Henley	26	10	1	15	599	696	−97	21	
10	Wakefield	26	10	0	16	547	638	−91	20	
11	Orrell	26	7	0	19	388	682	−294	14	
12	Waterloo	26	6	2	18	441	830	−389	14	
13	Rugby Lions	26	6	1	19	408	905	−497	13	Relegated
14	West Hartlepool	26	1	0	25	216	1114	−898	2	Relegated

Rules for classification: Points are awarded as follows: two points for a win; one point for a draw; no points for a loss.
- If teams are level at any stage, tiebreakers are applied in the following order: (1) difference between points for and against; (2) total number of points for.

== Results ==
=== Round 1 ===
4 September 1999

Exeter Chiefs	39 - 17	Waterloo
	Report

County Ground

4 September 1999

Henley Hawks	28 - 22	London Welsh
	Report

Dry Leas
Attendance: 1,500

4 September 1999

Manchester	7 - 36	Worcester
	Report

Grove Park
Attendance: 600
Referee: Geraint Ashton-Jones

4 September 1999

Moseley	24 - 0	West Hartlepool
	Report

The Reddings

4 September 1999

Orrell	8 - 25	Leeds Tykes
	Report

Edge Hall Road
Attendance: 1,000
Referee: Trevor Fisher

4 September 1999

Rugby Lions	6 - 48	Coventry
	Report

Webb Ellis Road

4 September 1999

Wakefield	8 - 30	Rotherham
	Report

College Grove

=== Round 2 ===
11 September 1999

Coventry	30 - 3	Henley Hawks
	Report

Coundon Road

11 September 1999

London Welsh	20 - 16	Rotherham
	Report

Old Deer Park

11 September 1999

Orrell	23 - 13	Wakefield
	Report

Edge Hall Road

11 September 1999

Leeds Tykes	32 - 10	Exeter Chiefs
	Report

Headingley
Referee: Steve Leyshon

11 September 1999

Waterloo	9 - 29	Moseley
	Report

St Anthony's

11 September 1999

Worcester	73 - 0	Rugby Lions
	Report

Sixways
Attendance: 2,400
Referee: Trevor Fisher

12 September 1999

West Hartlepool	19 - 24	Manchester
	Report

Victoria Park

=== Round 3 ===
18 September 1999

Exeter Chiefs	38 - 3	Orrell
	Report

County Ground

18 September 1999

Henley Hawks	24 - 31	Worcester
	Report

Dry Leas
Attendance: 1,000
Referee: Geoff Warren

18 September 1999

Manchester	29 - 14	Waterloo
	Report

Grove Park

18 September 1999

Moseley	11 - 15	Leeds Tykes
	Report

The Reddings
Attendance: 703
Referee: Martin Fox

18 September 1999

Rotherham	20 - 13	Coventry
	Report

Clifton Lane

18 September 1999

Rugby Lions	37 - 10	West Hartlepool
	Report

Webb Ellis Road

18 September 1999

Wakefield	22 - 37	London Welsh
	Report

College Grove
Attendance: 600

=== Round 4 ===
25 September 1999

Coventry	30 - 3	London Welsh
	Report

Coundon Road
Attendance: 1,595

25 September 1999

Exeter Chiefs	35 - 25	Wakefield
	Report

County Ground

25 September 1999

Orrell	12 - 19	Moseley
	Report

Edge Hall Road

25 September 1999

Waterloo	32 - 10	Rugby Lions
	Report

St Anthony's Road

25 September 1999

West Hartlepool	0 - 30	Henley Hawks
	Report

Victoria Park

25 September 1999

Worcester	21 - 10	Rotherham
	Report

Sixways
Attendance: 3,200
Referee: Ashley Rowden

27 September 1999

Leeds Tykes	42 - 0	Manchester
	Report

Headingley
Attendance: 924
Referee: David Matthews

=== Round 5 ===
2 October 1999

Henley Hawks	40 - 24	Waterloo
	Report

Dry Leas

2 October 1999

London Welsh	19 - 20	Worcester
	Report

Old Deer Park
Attendance: 1,400
Referee: Chris Rees

2 October 1999

Manchester	48 - 7	Orrell
	Report

Grove Park

2 October 1999

Moseley	17 - 20	Exeter Chiefs
	Report

The Reddings
Attendance: 613

2 October 1999

Rotherham	93 - 8	West Hartlepool
	Report

Clifton Lane

2 October 1999

Rugby Lions	19 - 28	Leeds Tykes
	Report

Webb Ellis Road

2 October 1999

Wakefield	24 - 15	Coventry
	Report

College Grove

=== Round 6 ===
8 October 1999

Worcester	33 - 15	Coventry
	Report

Sixways
Attendance: 3,112
Referee: May

9 October 1999

Exeter Chiefs	44 - 25	Manchester
	Report

County Ground

9 October 1999

Leeds Tykes	49 - 7	Henley Hawks
	Report

Headingley

9 October 1999

Moseley	27 - 12	Wakefield
	Report

The Reddings

9 October 1999

Orrell	32 - 11	Rugby Lions
	Report

Edge Hall Road

9 October 1999

Waterloo	13 - 33	Rotherham
	Report

St Anthony's Road

9 October 1999

West Hartlepool	8 - 28	London Welsh
	Report

Victoria Park
Attendance: 720

=== Round 7 ===
16 October 1999

Coventry	59 - 19	West Hartlepool
	Report

Coundon Road

16 October 1999

Henley Hawks	39 - 16	Orrell
	Report

Dry Leas

16 October 1999

London Welsh	51 - 32	Waterloo
	Report

Old Deer Park
Attendance: 1,050

16 October 1999

Manchester	22 - 15	Moseley
	Report

Grove Park

16 October 1999

Rotherham	17 - 11	Leeds Tykes
	Report

Clifton Lane

16 October 1999

Rugby Lions	22 - 45	Exeter Chiefs
	Report

Webb Ellis Road

16 October 1999

Wakefield	15 - 84	Worcester
	Report

College Grove
Referee: David Sainsbury

=== Round 8 ===
23 October 1999

Exeter Chiefs	31 - 6	Henley Hawks
	Report

County Ground
Attendance: 870

23 October 1999

Leeds Tykes	23 - 11	London Welsh
	Report

Headingley
Attendance: 1,560
Referee: Steve Savage

23 October 1999

Manchester	33 - 17	Wakefield
	Report

Grove Park

23 October 1999

Moseley	42 - 19	Rugby Lions
	Report

The Reddings

23 October 1999

Orrell	14 - 36	Rotherham
	Report

Edge Hall Road

23 October 1999

Waterloo	13 - 33	Coventry
	Report

St Anthony's Road

23 October 1999

West Hartlepool	9 - 58	Worcester
	Report

Victoria Park
Referee: Mike Hamlyn

=== Round 9 ===
20 November 1999

Coventry	12 - 25	Leeds Tykes
	Report

Coundon Road
Attendance: 1,700
Referee: Trevor Fisher

20 November 1999

Henley Hawks	29 - 18	Moseley
	Report

Dry Leas

20 November 1999

London Welsh	14 - 0	Orrell
	Report

Old Deer Park
Attendance: 650

20 November 1999

Rotherham	36 - 15	Exeter Chiefs
	Report

Clifton Lane
Attendance: 1,000

20 November 1999

Rugby Lions	16 - 35	Manchester
	Report

Webb Ellis Road

20 November 1999

Wakefield	47 - 7	West Hartlepool
	Report

College Grove

20 November 1999

Worcester	78 - 10	Waterloo
	Report

Sixways
Attendance: 2,900
Referee: Robin Goodliffe

=== Round 10 ===
27 November 1999

Exeter Chiefs	19 - 12	London Welsh
	Report

County Ground

27 November 1999

Leeds Tykes	20 - 9	Worcester
	Report

Headingley
Attendance: 2,047
Referee: Ashley Rowden

27 November 1999

Manchester	29 - 25	Henley Hawks
	Report

Grove Park

27 November 1999

Orrell	20 - 15	Coventry
	Report

Edge Hall Road

27 November 1999

Rotherham	30 - 15	Moseley
	Report

Clifton Lane

27 November 1999

Rugby Lions	14 - 9	Wakefield
	Report

Webb Ellis Road

27 November 1999

Waterloo	34 - 10	West Hartlepool
	Report

St Anthony's Road

=== Round 11 ===
4 December 1999

Coventry	42 - 33	Exeter Chiefs
	Report

Coundon Road
Attendance: 1,000

4 December 1999

Henley Hawks	14 - 20	Rugby Lions
	Report

Dry Leas

4 December 1999

London Welsh	24 - 8	Moseley
	Report

Old Deer Park
Attendance: 800

4 December 1999

Rotherham	38 - 6	Manchester
	Report

Clifton Lane

4 December 1999

Wakefield	44 - 0	Waterloo
	Report

College Grove

4 December 1999

Worcester	35 - 32	Orrell
	Report

Sixways
Referee: Trevor Fisher

5 December 1999

West Hartlepool	0 - 45	Leeds Tykes
	Report

Victoria Park
Attendance: 512
Referee: Mike Hamlyn

=== Round 12 ===
11 December 1999

Exeter Chiefs	16 - 10	Worcester
	Report

County Ground
Attendance: 1,500
Referee: Steve Leyshon

11 December 1999

Henley Hawks	32 - 14	Wakefield
	Report

Dry Leas

11 December 1999

Leeds Tykes	54 - 0	Waterloo
	Report

Headingley
Attendance: 493
Referee: Geraint Ashton-Jones

11 December 1999

Manchester	11 - 9	London Welsh
	Report

Grove Park
Attendance: 450

11 December 1999

Moseley	11 - 22	Coventry
	Report

The Reddings

11 December 1999

Orrell	15 - 23	West Hartlepool
	Report

Edge Hall Road

11 December 1999

Rugby Lions	6 - 56	Rotherham
	Report

Webb Ellis Road

=== Round 13 ===
18 December 1999

Coventry	20 - 9	Manchester
	Report

Coundon Road

18 December 1999

Leeds Tykes	P - P	Wakefield

- Postponed. Game rescheduled for 29 January 2000.

18 December 1999

London Welsh	70 - 7	Rugby Lions
	Report

Old Deer Park
Attendance: 1,200

18 December 1999

Rotherham	53 - 7	Henley Hawks
	Report

Clifton Lane

18 December 1999

Waterloo	18 - 14	Orrell
	Report

St Anthony's Road

18 December 1999

West Hartlepool	P - P	Exeter Chiefs

- Postponed. Game rescheduled for 1 May 2000.

18 December 1999

Worcester	30 - 22	Moseley
	Report

Sixways
Referee: David Grashoff

=== Round 14 ===
8 January 2000

Coventry	37 - 13	Orrell
	Report

Coundon Road

8 January 2000

Henley Hawks	41 - 18	Manchester
	Report

Dry Leas

8 January 2000

London Welsh	24 - 14	Exeter Chiefs
	Report

Old Deer Park
Attendance: 1,050

8 January 2000

Moseley	5 - 56	Rotherham
	Report

The Reddings

8 January 2000

Wakefield	23 - 5	Rugby Lions
	Report

College Grove

8 January 2000

West Hartlepool	11 - 16	Waterloo
	Report

Victoria Park

8 January 2000

Worcester	6 - 12	Leeds Tykes
	Report

Sixways
Attendance: 3,148
Referee: May

=== Round 15 ===
15 January 2000

Exeter Chiefs	35 - 6	Coventry
	Report

County Ground
Attendance: 980

15 January 2000

Leeds Tykes	57 - 0	West Hartlepool
	Report

Headingley
Attendance: 721
Referee: David Grashoff

15 January 2000

Manchester	6 - 41	Rotherham
	Report

Grove Park

15 January 2000
14:15

Moseley	35 - 16	London Welsh
	Report

The Reddings
Attendance: 812

15 January 2000

Orrell	3 - 41	Worcester
	Report

Edge Hall Road
Referee: Huw Jones-Williams

15 January 2000

Rugby Lions	17 - 34	Henley Hawks
	Report

Webb Ellis Road

15 January 2000

Waterloo	9 - 22	Wakefield
	Report

St Anthony's Road

=== Round 16 ===
22 January 2000

Exeter Chiefs	0 - 34	Rotherham
	Report

County Ground
Attendance: 1,121

22 January 2000

Leeds Tykes	P - P	Coventry

- Postponed. Game rescheduled for 5 February 2000.

22 January 2000

Manchester	50 - 22	Rugby Lions
	Report

Grove Park

22 January 2000

Moseley	19 - 25	Henley Hawks
	Report

The Reddings

22 January 2000

Orrell	15 - 45	London Welsh
	Report

Edge Hall Road
Attendance: 400

22 January 2000
14:15

Waterloo	12 - 22	Worcester
	Report

St Anthony's Road
Attendance: 500
Referee: Geoff Warren

22 January 2000

West Hartlepool	3 - 45	Wakefield
	Report

Victoria Park

=== Round 13 (Rescheduled game) ===
29 January 2000
14:30

Leeds Tykes	21 - 3	Wakefield
	Report

Headingley
Attendance: 834
Referee: John Barnard

=== Round 16 (Rescheduled game) ===
5 February 2000
14:30

Leeds Tykes	43 - 6	Coventry
	Report

Headingley
Attendance: 590
Referee: Roy Maybank

=== Round 17 ===
12 February 2000

Coventry	36 - 31	Waterloo
	Report

Coundon Road

12 February 2000
14:30

Henley Hawks	21 - 31	Exeter Chiefs
	Report

Dry Leas
Attendance: 800

12 February 2000
14:00

London Welsh	15 - 13	Leeds Tykes
	Report

Old Deer Park
Attendance: 1,200
Referee: Geoff Warren

12 February 2000

Rotherham	45 - 13	Orrell
	Report

Clifton Lane

12 February 2000

Rugby Lions	10 - 25	Moseley
	Report

Webb Ellis Road

12 February 2000

Wakefield	19 - 15	Manchester
	Report

College Grove

12 February 2000
14:30

Worcester	57 - 3	West Hartlepool
	Report

Sixways
Attendance: 2,043
Referee: Stuart Terheege

=== Round 18 ===
18 February 2000
20:00

Leeds Tykes	16 - 17	Rotherham
	Report

Headingley
Attendance: 5,019
Referee: Chris White

19 February 2000

Exeter Chiefs	53 - 10	Rugby Lions
	Report

County Ground

19 February 2000

Moseley	P - P	Manchester

- Postponed. Game rescheduled for 1 April 2000.

19 February 2000

Orrell	30 - 20	Henley Hawks
	Report

Edge Hall Road

19 February 2000
13:00

Waterloo	5 - 49	London Welsh
	Report

St Anthony's Road
Attendance: 300

19 February 2000

West Hartlepool	5 - 57	Coventry
	Report

Victoria Park

19 February 2000

Worcester	41 - 32	Wakefield
	Report

Sixways
Attendance: 2,107
Referee: Geraint Ashton-Jones

=== Round 19 ===
11 March 2000

Coventry	35 - 28	Worcester
	Report

Coundon Road
Attendance: 2,200
Referee: Roy Maybank

11 March 2000

Henley Hawks	15 - 51	Leeds Tykes
	Report

Dry Leas
Attendance: 650
Referee: Steve Leyshon

11 March 2000

London Welsh	48 - 3	West Hartlepool
	Report

Old Deer Park
Attendance: 700

11 March 2000

Manchester	10 - 24	Exeter Chiefs
	Report

Grove Park
Attendance: 650

11 March 2000

Rotherham	78 - 10	Waterloo
	Report

Clifton Lane

11 March 2000

Wakefield	13 - 32	Moseley
	Report

College Grove

11 March 2000

Rugby Lions	14 - 23	Orrell
	Report

=== Round 20 ===
17 March 2000
19:30

Worcester	28 - 24	Exeter Chiefs
	Report

Sixways
Referee: Chris White

18 March 2000

Coventry	27 - 31	Moseley
	Report

Coundon Road
Attendance: 600

18 March 2000

Rotherham	54 - 0	Rugby Lions
	Report

Clifton Lane

18 March 2000

Wakefield	22 - 7	Henley Hawks
	Report

College Grove

18 March 2000

Waterloo	19 - 33	Leeds Tykes
	Report

St Anthony's Road
Attendance: 350
Referee: David Grashoff

18 March 2000

West Hartlepool	16 - 28	Orrell
	Report

Victoria Park
Attendance: 300

19 March 2000

London Welsh	52 - 10	Manchester
	Report

Old Deer Park
Attendance: 600

=== Round 21 ===
25 March 2000

Coventry	33 - 18	Wakefield
	Report

Coundon Road

25 March 2000

Exeter Chiefs	16 - 15	Moseley
	Report

County Ground
Attendance: 763

25 March 2000

Leeds Tykes	P - P	Rugby Lions

- Postponed. Game rescheduled for 1 April 2000.

25 March 2000

Orrell	23 - 12	Manchester
	Report

Edge Hall Road

25 March 2000

Waterloo	27 - 27	Henley Hawks
	Report

St Anthony's Road

25 March 2000

West Hartlepool	7 - 52	Rotherham
	Report

Victoria Park

25 March 2000

Worcester	23 - 10	London Welsh
	Report

Sixways
Attendance: 2,605
Referee: Steve Leyshon

=== Round 18, 21 & 25 (Rescheduled games) ===
1 April 2000
14:30

Leeds Tykes	28 - 3	Rugby Lions
	Report

Headingley
Attendance: 348
Referee: Ashley Rowden

1 April 2000

Moseley	30 - 10	Manchester
	Report

The Reddings

2 April 2000

London Welsh	33 - 25	Henley Hawks
	Report

Old Deer Park
Attendance: 500

- Game brought forward from 29 April 2000.

=== Round 22 ===
8 April 2000

Henley Hawks	36 - 16	West Hartlepool
	Report

Dry Leas

8 April 2000

London Welsh	22 - 14	Coventry
	Report

Old Deer Park
Attendance: 1,350

8 April 2000

Manchester	21 - 26	Leeds Tykes
	Report

Grove Park
Attendance: 620
Referee: Stewart Piercy

8 April 2000

Moseley	39 - 5	Orrell
	Report

The Reddings

8 April 2000

Rotherham	42 - 0	Worcester
	Report

Clifton Lane
Attendance: 2,900
Referee: Nigel Yates

8 April 2000

Rugby Lions	25 - 25	Waterloo
	Report

Webb Ellis Road

8 April 2000

Wakefield	22 - 9	Exeter Chiefs
	Report

College Grove
Attendance: 350

=== Round 23 ===
15 April 2000

Coventry	6 - 45	Rotherham
	Report

Coundon Road

15 April 2000

Leeds Tykes	53 - 13	Moseley
	Report

Headingley
Attendance: 462
Referee: Geoff Warren

15 April 2000

London Welsh	37 - 21	Wakefield
	Report

Old Deer Park
Attendance: 950

15 April 2000

Orrell	23 - 29	Exeter Chiefs
	Report

Edge Hall Road

15 April 2000

Waterloo	33 - 3	Manchester
	Report

St Anthony's Road

15 April 2000

West Hartlepool	14 - 39	Rugby Lions
	Report

Victoria Park

15 April 2000

Worcester	30 - 8	Henley Hawks
	Report

Sixways
Attendance: 1,616
Referee: Martin Fox

=== Round 24 ===
22 April 2000

Exeter Chiefs	13 - 10	Leeds Tykes
	Report

County Ground
Attendance: 852
Referee: David Grashoff

22 April 2000

Henley Hawks	32 - 40	Coventry
	Report

Dry Leas

22 April 2000

Manchester	24 - 0	West Hartlepool
	Report

Grove Park

22 April 2000

Moseley	34 - 13	Waterloo
	Report

The Reddings

22 April 2000

Rotherham	42 - 13	London Welsh
	Report

Clifton Lane
Attendance: 2,500

22 April 2000

Rugby Lions	21 - 15	Worcester
	Report

Webb Ellis Road
Attendance: 650
Referee: May

22 April 2000

Wakefield	16 - 0	Orrell
	Report

College Grove

=== Round 25 ===
29 April 2000

Coventry	39 - 26	Rugby Lions
	Report

Coundon Road

29 April 2000

London Welsh	P - P	Henley Hawks

- Game brought forward to 2 April 2000.

29 April 2000

Rotherham	46 - 10	Wakefield
	Report

Clifton Lane

29 April 2000

Waterloo	10 - 13	Exeter Chiefs
	Report

St Anthony's Road
Attendance: 365

29 April 2000

West Hartlepool	19 - 25	Moseley
	Report

Victoria Park

29 April 2000

Worcester	39 - 10	Manchester
	Report

Sixways
Attendance: 1,735
Referee: Eric Woodmason

1 May 2000
14:30

Leeds Tykes	17 - 3	Orrell
	Report

Headingley
Attendance: 631
Referee: Roy Maybank

=== Round 13 (Rescheduled game) ===
1 May 2000
13:00

West Hartlepool	6 - 55	Exeter Chiefs
	Report

Victoria Park
Attendance: 300

=== Round 26 ===
6 May 2000

Exeter Chiefs	81 - 0	West Hartlepool
	Report

County Ground
Attendance: 1,280

6 May 2000

Henley Hawks	24 - 25	Rotherham
	Report

Dry Leas

6 May 2000

Manchester	41 - 24	Coventry
	Report

Grove Park

6 May 2000

Moseley	34 - 17	Worcester
	Report

The Reddings
Attendance: 3,000
Referee: Steve Savage

6 May 2000

Orrell	13 - 17	Waterloo
	Report

Edge Hall Road

6 May 2000

Rugby Lions	32 - 28	London Welsh
	Report

Webb Ellis Road
Attendance: 1,500

6 May 2000

Wakefield	31 - 43	Leeds Tykes
	Report

College Grove
Attendance: 450
Referee: Nigel Yates

== Promotion/Relegation Playoff ==
12th placed 1999–2000 Premiership Rugby side Bedford faced champions Rotherham in a two legged playoff to see who was promoted or relegated.

May 2000

Rotherham	40–20	Bedford

Clifton Lane

May 2000

Bedford	14–0	Rotherham

Goldington Road

- Rotherham win 40–34 on aggregate and are promoted to 2000–01 Premiership Rugby.

== Total Season Attendances ==
Club	Home Games	Total	Average	Highest	Lowest	% Capacity
Coventry	5 (Note: Missing home attendances v Henley Hawks on 11 September 1999, West Hartlepool on 16 October 1999, Manchester on 18 December 1999, Orrell on 8 January 2000, Waterloo on 12 February 2000, Wakefield on 25 March 2000, Rotherham on 15 April 2000 and Rugby Lions on 29 April 2000.)	7,095	1,419	2,200	600	14%
Exeter Chiefs	7 (Note: Missing home attendances v Waterloo on 4 September 1999, Orrell on 18 September 1999, Wakefield on 25 September 1999, Manchester on 9 October 1999, London Welsh on 27 November 1999 and Rugby Lions on 19 February 2000.)	7,366	1,052	1,500	763	18%
Henley Hawks	4 (Note: Missing home attendances v Waterloo on 2 October 1999, Orrell on 16 October 1999, Moseley on 20 November 1999, Rugby Lions on 4 December 1999, Wakefield on 11 December 1999, Manchester on 8 January 2000, West Hartlepool on 8 April 2000, Coventry on 22 April 2000 and Rotherham on 6 May 2000.)	3,950	988	1,500	650	25%
Leeds Tykes	11 (Note: Missing home attendances v Exeter Chiefs on 11 September 1999 and Henley Hawks on 9 October 1999.)	13,629	1,239	5,019	348	6%
London Welsh	12 (Note: Missing home attendance v Rotherham on 11 September 1999.)	11,450	954	1,400	500	21%
Manchester	4 (Note: Missing home attendances v Waterloo on 18 September 1999, Orrell on 2 October 1999, Moseley on 16 October 1999, Wakefield on 23 October 1999, Henley Hawks on 27 November 1999, Rotherham on 15 January 2000, Rugby Lions on 22 January 2000, West Hartlepool on 22 April 2000 and Coventry on 6 May 2000.)	2,320	580	650	450	15%
Moseley	4 (Note: Missing home attendances v West Hartlepool on 4 September 1999, Wakefield on 9 October 1999, Rugby Lions on 23 October 1999, Coventry on 11 December 1999, Rotherham on 8 January 2000, Henley Hawks on 22 January 2000, Manchester on 1 April 2000, Orrell on 8 April 2000 and Waterloo on 22 April 2000.)	5,128	1,282	3,000	613	13%
Orrell	2 (Note: Missing home attendances v Wakefield on 11 September 1999, Moseley on 25 September 1999, Rugby Lions on 9 October 1999, Rotherham on 23 October 1999, Coventry on 27 November 1999, West Hartlepool on 11 December 1999, Worcester on 15 January 2000, Henley Hawks on 19 February 2000, Manchester on 25 March 2000, Exeter Chiefs on 15 April 2000 and Waterloo on 6 May 2000.)	1,400	700	1,000	400	13%
Rotherham	3 (Note: Missing home attendances v Coventry on 18 September 1999, West Hartlepool on 2 October 1999, Leeds Tykes on 16 October 1999, Moseley on 27 November 1999, Manchester on 4 December 1999, Henley Hawks on 18 December 1999, Orrell on 12 February 2000, Waterloo on 11 March 2000, Rugby Lions on 18 March 2000 and Wakefield on 29 April 2000.)	6,400	2,133	2,900	1,000	80%
Rugby Lions	2 (Note: Missing home attendances v Coventry on 4 September 1999, West Hartlepool on 18 September 1999, Leeds Tykes on 2 October 1999, Exeter Chiefs on 16 October 1999, Manchester on 20 November 1999, Wakefield on 27 November 1999, Rotherham on 11 December 1999, Henley Hawks on 15 January 2000, Moseley on 12 February 2000 and Waterloo on 8 April 2000.)	2,150	1,075	1,500	650	34%
Wakefield	3 (Note: Missing home attendances v Rotherham on 4 September 1999, Coventry on 2 October 1999, Worcester on 16 October 1999, West Hartlepool on 20 November 1999, Waterloo on 4 December 1999, Rugby Lions on 8 January 2000, Manchester on 12 February 2000, Moseley on 11 March 2000, Henley Hawks on 18 March 2000 and Orrell on 22 April 2000.)	1,400	467	600	350	12%
Waterloo	4 (Note: Missing home attendances v Rugby Lions on 25 September 1999, Rotherham on 9 October 1999, Coventry on 23 October 1999, West Hartlepool on 27 November 1999, Orrell on 18 December 1999, Wakefield on 15 January 2000, Henley Hawks on 25 March 2000 and Manchester on 15 April 2000.)	1,515	379	500	300	4%
West Hartlepool	3 (Note: Missing home attendances v Manchester on 12 September 1999, Henley Hawks on 25 September 1999, Worcester on 23 October 1999, Waterloo on 8 January 2000, Wakefield on 22 January 2000, Coventry on 19 February 2000, Rotherham on 25 March 2000, Rugby Lions on 15 April 2000 and Moseley on 29 April 2000.)	1,532	511	720	300	7%
Worcester	10 (Note: Missing home attendances v Orrell on 4 December 1999, Moseley on 18 December 1999 and Exeter Chiefs on 17 March 2000.)	24,866	2,487	3,200	1,616	29%

== Individual statistics ==
- Note if players are tied on tries or points the player with the lowest number of appearances will come first. Also note that points scorers includes tries as well as conversions, penalties and drop goals.

=== Top points scorers ===
Rank	Player	Team	Appearances	Points
1	(England) Sam Howard	Exeter Chiefs	26	312
2	(England) Steve Gough	Coventry	23	266
3	(Samoa) Mike Umaga	Rotherham	18	249
4	(England) Stephen Swindells	Manchester	22	246
5	(England) Matt Jones	Henley Hawks	24	236
6	(England) Tony Yapp	Worcester	23	229
7	(England) Lyndon Griffiths	Waterloo	25	201
8	(England) Andy Lee	London Welsh	25	198
9	(England) Jon Benson	Leeds Tykes	25	185
10	(England) Martyn Davies	Rugby Lions	21	179

=== Top try scorers ===
Rank	Player	Team	Appearances	Tries
1	(England) Dean Lax	Rotherham	20	18
2	(England) Duncan Roke	Henley Hawks	26	17
2	(England) David Scully	Rotherham	26	17
3	(England) Simon Frost	London Welsh	17	14
4	(England) Scott Roskell	London Welsh	23	13
4	(England) Nick Baxter	Worcester	25	13
4	(England) Matt Oliver	Leeds Tykes	25	13
5	(England) Andy Smallwood	Coventry	22	12
5	(England) Kurt Johnson	Coventry	24	12
5	(England) Peter Buxton	Moseley	26	12
5	(England) Jim Jenner	Worcester	26	12

== Season records ==
=== Team ===
Largest home win — 85 pts

93 - 8 Rotherham at home to West Hartlepool on 2 October 1999

Largest away win — 69 pts

84 - 15 Worcester away to Wakefield on 16 October 1999

Most points scored — 93 pts

93 - 8 Rotherham at home to West Hartlepool on 2 October 1999

Most tries in a match — 13 (x2)

Rotherham at home to West Hartlepool on 2 October 1999
Worcester away to Wakefield on 16 October 1999

Most conversions in a match — 11

Rotherham at home to West Hartlepool on 2 October 1999

Most penalties in a match — 8

Henley Hawks away to Rugby Lions on 15 January 2000

Most drop goals in a match — 2

Manchester at home to Orrell on 2 October 1999

=== Player ===
Most points in a match — 41

(England) Simon Binns for Rotherham at home to West Hartlepool on 2 October 1999

Most tries in a match — 4

(England) Andy Currier for London Welsh at home to Waterloo on 16 October 1999

Most conversions in a match — 10 (x3)

(England) Simon Binns for Rotherham at home to West Hartlepool on 2 October 1999
(Samoa) Mike Umaga for Rotherham at home to Waterloo on 11 March 2000
(England) Sam Howard for Exeter at home to West Hartlepool on 6 May 2000

Most penalties in a match — 8

(England) Matt Jones for Henley Hawks away to Rugby Lions on 15 January 2000

Most drop goals in a match — 2

(England) Rod Ellis for Manchester at home to Orrell on 2 October 1999

=== Attendances ===
Highest — 5,019

Leeds Tykes at home to Rotherham on 18 February 2000

Lowest — 300 (x3) (Note: As there are quite a few attendances missing it is possible that there was lower attendances than this during this season.)

Waterloo at home to London Welsh on 19 February 2000, West Hartlepool at home to Orrell on 18 March 2000 & Exeter Chiefs on 1 May 2000 Leeds Tykes at home to Moseley on 16 April 1999

Highest Average Attendance — 2,487

Worcester

Lowest Average Attendance — 379 (Note: As Waterloo had quite a few missing attendances it is quite possible that their average attendance was lower than this.)

Waterloo

== See also ==
- 1999–00 Premiership 1
- 1999–00 National League 1
- 1999–00 National League 2 North
- 1999–00 National League 2 South
