= 1999–2000 National League 2 South =

Rugby union competition in England

- Countries: England
- Champions: Esher (1st title)
- Runners-up: Penzance & Newlyn (not promoted)
- Relegated: Metropolitan Police, Norwich, Bridgwater & Albion
- Matches played: 182

The 1999–2000 National League 2 South (sponsored by Jewson) was the thirteenth full season of rugby union within the fourth tier (south) of the English league system, and the last until 2009–10 to use the name National League 2 South. It is counterpart to National League 2 North, which covers the northern half of the country.

At the end of the season, Esher were crowned as champions gaining promotion a to the 2000–01 National Division 2 (former National League 1), 5 points clear of second place Penzance & Newlyn. At the other end of the table, the first side to go down were Metropolitan Police who did not perform well with 26 losses from 26 games despite having finished 5th the previous season. They were followed by Norwich and Bridgwater & Albion who were competitive but still somewhat short of 12th placed Weston-super-Mare, who finished four points clear. Metropolitan Police and Norwich would fall to London 1 while Bridgwater Albion would fall to South West 1.

The reason National League 2 South had three relegation places compared to National League 2 North (who had one) was that both of the two teams relegated from the division above were based in the south of the country, requiring more places to accommodate for their arrival the following season.

== Structure ==
Each team played home and away matches against each of the other teams, playing a total of twenty-six matches each. The league champions were promoted to National Division 2 while the bottom three sides dropped to either London 1 or South West 1 depending on locality.

== Participating teams and locations ==
1999–00 National League 2 South teams in England

Team	Ground	Capacity	City/Area	Previous season
Barking	Goresbrook	1,000	Becontree, Dagenham, London	4th
Bridgwater & Albion	Bath Road	5,000	Bridgwater, Somerset	10th
Cheltenham	Newlands Park		Southam, Cheltenham, Gloucestershire	13th
Clifton	Station Road	2,200 (200 seats)	Cribbs Causeway, Henbury, Bristol	7th
Esher	Molesey Road	3,500	Hersham, Surrey	2nd (not promoted)
Metropolitan Police	Imber Court	3,500 (500 seats)	East Molesey, Surrey	5th
North Walsham	Norwich Road	1,200	Scottow, Norfolk	3rd
Norwich	Beeston Hyrne		Norwich, Norfolk	6th
Penzance & Newlyn	Mennaye Field	4,000	Penzance, Cornwall	Promoted from South West 1 (champions)
Plymouth Albion	Beacon Park	1,950 (450 seats)	Plymouth, Devon	12th
Redruth	Recreation Ground	12,000	Redruth, Cornwall	11th
Tabard	Cobden Hill		Radlett, Hertfordshire	8th
Westcombe Park	Goddington Dene	3,200	Orpington, London	Promoted from London 1 (champions)
Weston-super-Mare	Recreation Ground	3,000	Weston-super-Mare, Somerset	9th

== League table ==
1999–00 National League 2 South table
Pos	Team	Pld	W	D	L	PF	PA	PD	Pts	Qualification
1	Esher (C)	26	23	0	3	1013	355	+658	46	Promoted
2	Penzance & Newlyn	26	20	1	5	1045	481	+564	41	
3	North Walsham	25	18	0	7	750	346	+404	36	
4	Plymouth Albion	26	17	2	7	663	382	+281	36	
5	Redruth	26	16	0	10	597	523	+74	32	
6	Barking	26	15	0	11	628	533	+95	30	
7	Clifton	26	12	1	13	575	549	+26	25	
8	Tabard	26	11	1	14	552	627	−75	23	
9	Westcombe Park	26	11	0	15	560	706	−146	22	
10	Cheltenham	25	10	1	14	489	636	−147	21	
11	Weston-super-Mare	26	11	0	15	512	598	−86	20 (Note: 2 points deducted)	
12	Bridgwater & Albion (R)	26	8	0	18	523	729	−206	16	Relegated
13	Norwich (R)	26	6	0	20	321	685	−364	12	Relegated
14	Metropolitan Police (R)	26	0	0	26	223	1301	−1078	0	Relegated

Rules for classification: Points are awarded as follows: 2 pts for a win, 1 pt for a draw, 0 pts for a loss. If teams are level at any stage, difference between points for and against applies.
(C) Champions; (R) Relegated

== Sponsorship ==
National League 2 South is part of the Jewson National Leagues is sponsored by Jewson.

== See also ==
- 1999–00 Premiership 1
- 1999–00 Premiership 2
- 1999–00 National League 1
- 1999–00 National League 2 North
