= 1999–2000 National League 2 North =

Rugby union competition in England

- Countries: England
- Champions: Kendal (1st title)
- Runners-up: Stourbridge (not promoted)
- Relegated: Sheffield
- Matches played: 182

The 1999–00 National League 2 North was the thirteenth full season of rugby union within the fourth tier (north) of the English league system, and the last until 2009-10 to use the name National League 2 North. It is counterpart to National League 2 South, which covers the southern half of the country.

Kendal finished the season as champions, 5 points clear of second placed Stourbridge, to gain the only promotion spot to the 2000–01 National Division 2 (former National League 1). It was the second year in a row that Stourbridge had to be content with the runners up spot. At the other end of the table, Sheffield were the only side to be relegated, only winning 3 games and finishing 5 points adrift of safety. Sheffield would drop to Midlands 1. The reason National League 2 North only had one relegation place compared to National League 2 South (who had two) was that both of the two teams relegated from the division above were based in the south of the country, requiring more places to accommodate for their arrival the following season.

== Structure ==
Each team played home and away matches against each of the other teams, playing a total of twenty-six matches each. The league champions were promoted to National Division 2 while the bottom side dropped to either North 1 or Midlands depending on locality.

== Participating teams and locations ==
1999–00 National League 2 North teams in England

Team	Ground	Capacity	City/Area	Previous season
Aspatria	Bower Park	3,000 (300 seats)	Aspatria, Cumbria	10th
Bedford Athletic	Putnoe Woods	500	Bedford, Bedfordshire	Promoted from Midlands 1 (1st)
Doncaster	Castle Park	3,075	Doncaster, South Yorkshire	Promoted from North 1 (1st)
Kendal	Mint Bridge	4,600 (600 seats)	Kendal, Cumbria	4th
Liverpool St Helens	Moss Lane	4,370 (370 seats)	St Helens, Merseyside	Relegated from National 1 (14th)
Morley	Scatcherd Lane	6,000 (1,000 seats)	Morley, Leeds, West Yorkshire	Relegated from National 1 (13th)
New Brighton	Hartsfield	2,000	Moreton, Merseyside	3rd
Nuneaton	Liberty Way	3,800 (500 seats)	Nuneaton, Warwickshire	5th
Sandal	Milnthorpe Green		Sandal Magna, Wakefield, West Yorkshire	7th
Sedgley Park	Park Lane	3,000	Whitefield, Greater Manchester	8th
Sheffield	Abbeydale Park	3,300 (100 seats) (Note: Although a 1990 club estimate was 1,100 (100 seated and 1,000 standing) this is very conservative as Abbeydale Park would experience 3,000+ crowds several times in later history in what was a relatively unchanged ground.)	Dore, Sheffield, South Yorkshire	6th
Stourbridge	Stourton Park	3,500 (450 seats)	Stourbridge, West Midlands	2nd (not promoted)
Walsall	Broadway	2,250 (250 seats)	Walsall, West Midlands	9th
Whitchurch	Edgeley Park		Whitchurch, Shropshire	11th

== League table ==
1999–2000 National League 2 North table
Pos	Team	Pld	W	D	L	PF	PA	PD	Pts	Qualification
1	Kendal (C)	26	24	0	2	817	305	+512	48	Promoted
2	Stourbridge	26	21	1	4	713	406	+307	43	
3	New Brighton	26	20	0	6	752	315	+437	40	
4	Walsall	26	16	0	10	585	416	+169	32	
5	Sedgley Park	26	14	2	10	689	484	+205	30	
6	Doncaster	26	12	2	12	657	542	+115	26	
7	Morley	26	13	0	13	621	542	+79	26	
8	Nuneaton	26	11	1	14	610	665	−55	23	
9	Bedford Athletic	26	11	0	15	564	726	−162	22	
10	Sandal	26	9	2	15	460	554	−94	20	
11	Whitchurch	26	9	1	16	430	795	−365	19	
12	Aspatria	26	8	0	18	476	679	−203	16	
13	Liverpool St Helens	26	6	0	20	365	818	−453	12	
14	Sheffield (R)	26	3	1	22	297	789	−492	7	Relegated

Rules for classification: Points are awarded as follows: 2 pts for a win, 1 pt for a draw, 0 pts for a loss. If teams are level at any stage, difference between points for and against applies.
(C) Champions; (R) Relegated

== Sponsorship ==
National League 2 North is part of the Jewson National Leagues and is sponsored by Jewson.

== See also ==
- 1999–00 Premiership 1
- 1999–00 Premiership 2
- 1999–00 National League 1
- 1999–00 National League 2 South
