= 1999–00 Premiership 1 =

Rugby union competition in England

- Countries: England
- Date: 10 September 1999 – 28 May 2000
- Champions: Leicester Tigers (4th title)
- Runners-up: Bath
- Relegated: Bedford
- Matches played: 132
- Attendance: 751,784 (average 5,695 per match)
- Highest attendance: 17,109 – Leicester v Bath (21 May 2000)
- Lowest attendance: 1,486 – Bedford v Sale (14 May 2000)
- Top point scorer: 324 – Jarrod Cunningham (London Irish)
- Top try scorer: 15 – Iain Balshaw (Bath)

The 1999–00 Premiership 1 was the thirteenth season of the first tier of the English league system, currently known a Premiership Rugby, and the third and final to be sponsored by Allied Dunbar, having previous been sponsored by Courage Brewery. Leicester Tigers were defending champions and Bristol the promoted side. The league was reduced from fourteen teams to twelve following London Scottish and Richmond both entering administration.

At the end of the season Leicester Tigers finished as champions, retaining their title (and fourth overall). Bottom side Bedford were relegated to the 2000–01 National Division One (formerly Premiership 2) after losing the promotion-relegation playoff against Premiership 2 champions Rotherham.

== Structure ==
Each side played one another twice, in a round robin system, home and away, to make a total of twenty-two matches for each team. The bottom side would play a two legged promotion-relegation playoff against the Premiership 2 league champion to decide who be in the division for the following season.

== Participating teams ==
Locations of the 1999–00 Allied Dunbar Premiership One teams

Team	Stadium	Capacity	City/Area	Previous season
Bath	Recreation Ground	8,500	Bath, Somerset	6th
Bedford	Goldington Road	6,500	Bedford, Bedfordshire	13th
Bristol	Memorial Stadium	8,500 (1,200 seats)	Bristol	Promoted from Premiership 2 (1st)
Gloucester	Kingsholm	12,000	Gloucester, Gloucestershire	10th
Harlequins	The Stoop	9,000 (2,000 seats)	Twickenham, London	4th
Leicester Tigers	Welford Road	17,000 (Note: Welford Road capacity up from 17,000 to 17,109 for the 1999-00 season, which was achieved against Bath on 21 May 2000.)	Leicester, Leicestershire	Champions
London Irish	The Stoop (Note: London Irish would groundshare with Harlequins for the 1999–00 season having previous been based at The Avenue in Sunbury-on-Thames.)	9,000	Twickenham, London	7th
London Wasps	Loftus Road (Note: Wasps would continue to groundshare with football team Queens Park Rangers at Loftus Road.)	18,439	Shepherd's Bush, London	5th
Newcastle Falcons	Kingston Park (Note: Newcastle played three home games at the 11,800 capacity Gateshead International Stadium, Gateshead on 2 September 1998, 27 September 1998 and 11 October 1998.)	8,000 (Note: Kingston Park capacity up from 6,900 to around 8,000 for the 1999-00 season, due to the construction of the 2,500 capacity North Stand in 1999.)	Newcastle upon Tyne, Tyne and Wear	8th
Northampton Saints	Franklin's Gardens	10,000	Northampton, Northamptonshire	2nd
Sale Sharks (Note: Sale became official known as Sale Sharks from the 1999–00 season onward.)	Heywood Road	4,800	Sale, Greater Manchester	11th
Saracens	Vicarage Road (Note: Saracens would continue to groundshare with football team Watford at Vicarage Road.)	22,000	Watford, Hertfordshire	3rd

== Table ==
The season began on 10 September 1999.

Points increased from 2 to 3 for a win after the World Cup in November 1999. This was an attempt to ensure competitive balance in the leagues for teams while they were without their international players.

Pos	Team	Pld	W	D	L	PF	PA	PD	TF	TA	Pts	Qualification
1	Leicester Tigers (C)	22	18	1	3	687	425	+262	74	45	51	Champion
2	Bath	22	15	2	5	690	425	+265	71	44	43	
3	Gloucester	22	15	0	7	628	490	+138	68	46	40	
4	Saracens	22	14	0	8	729	514	+215	83	57	37	
5	Northampton Saints	22	13	0	9	551	480	+71	61	51	35	
6	Bristol	22	12	1	9	632	602	+30	76	60	34	
7	London Wasps	22	11	1	10	640	461	+179	76	39	32	
8	London Irish	22	9	1	12	613	616	−3	63	77	25	
9	Newcastle Falcons	22	6	2	14	377	630	−253	32	74	20	
10	Harlequins	22	7	0	15	441	687	−246	55	82	18	
11	Sale Sharks	22	7	0	15	381	633	−252	40	73	18	
12	Bedford Blues (R)	22	1	0	21	396	802	−406	51	102	3	Relegated

== Results ==
=== Week 1 ===
10 September 1999
15:00

Bristol Shoguns	40–25	Bedford Blues

Memorial Stadium
Attendance: 4,785

11 September 1999
15:00

Gloucester	31–16	Newcastle Falcons

Kingsholm
Attendance: 5,453

11 September 1999
15:00

NEC Harlequins	10–30	Bath Rugby

Twickenham Stoop
Attendance: 5,428

11 September 1999
15:00

Northampton Saints	46–24	Leicester Tigers

Franklin’s Gardens
Attendance: 9,512

11 September 1999
15:00

Sale Sharks	16–8	London Wasps

Heywood Road
Attendance: 2,210

12 September 1999
15:00

Saracens	23–28	London Irish

Vicarage Road
Attendance: 7,121

=== Week 2 ===
25 September 1999
15:00

Bath Rugby	33–13	Northampton Saints

Recreation Ground
Attendance: 5,000

25 September 1999
15:00

Bedford Blues	8–27	London Irish

Goldington Road
Attendance: 2,659

25 September 1999
15:00

Leicester Tigers	18–3	Sale Sharks

Welford Road
Attendance: 8,721

25 September 1999
15:00

NEC Harlequins	33–24	Saracens

Twickenham Stoop
Attendance: 5,361

26 September 1999
15:00

London Wasps	30–26	Gloucester

Loftus Road
Attendance: 5,127

26 September 1999
15:00

Newcastle Falcons	32–37	Bristol Shoguns

Kingston Park
Attendance: 3,342

=== Week 3 ===
1 October 1999
19:30

Gloucester	34–6	Leicester Tigers

Kingsholm
Attendance: 5,338

1 October 1999
20:00

Bristol Shoguns	20–13	London Wasps

Memorial Stadium
Attendance: 3,385

1 October 1999
20:00

Saracens	39–15	Bedford Blues

Vicarage Road
Attendance: 4,513

2 October 1999
15:00

Northampton Saints	29–27	NEC Harlequins

Franklin’s Gardens
Attendance: 6,257

2 October 1999
15:00

Sale Sharks	28–22	Bath Rugby

Heywood Road
Attendance: 2,800

3 October 1999
14:00

London Irish	56–8	Newcastle Falcons

Twickenham Stoop
Attendance: 3,951

=== Week 4 ===
9 October 1999
14:30

Northampton Saints	8–32	Saracens

Franklin’s Gardens
Attendance: 5,781

10 October 1999
13:00

London Wasps	43–20	London Irish

Loftus Road
Attendance: 3,566

10 October 1999
13:00

NEC Harlequins	3–10	Sale Sharks

Twickenham Stoop
Attendance: 2,322

10 October 1999
14:15

Bath Rugby	33–20	Gloucester

Recreation Ground
Attendance: 6,600

=== Week 5 ===
15 October 1999
19:30

Gloucester	24–23	NEC Harlequins

Kingsholm
Attendance: 4,809

16 October 1999
15:00

Bristol Shoguns	31–31	Bath Rugby

Memorial Stadium
Attendance: 7,020

16 October 1999
15:00

London Irish	30–31	Leicester Tigers

Twickenham Stoop
Attendance: 3,705

17 October 1999
15:00

Sale Sharks	9–13	Northampton Saints

Heywood Road
Attendance: 2,900

17 October 1999
15:00

Saracens	55–6	Newcastle Falcons

Vicarage Road
Attendance: 6,319

=== Week 6 ===
23 October 1999
13:00

Leicester Tigers	36–19	Bristol Shoguns

Welford Road
Attendance: 7,785

=== Week 7 ===
28 October 1999
15:00

NEC Harlequins	36–20	Bristol Shoguns

Twickenham Stoop
Attendance: 2,719

29 October 1999
19:45

Sale Sharks	12–58	Saracens

Heywood Road
Attendance: 2,800

30 October 1999
13:00

Bath Rugby	25–25	London Irish

Recreation Ground
Attendance: 6,200

30 October 1999
13:00

Leicester Tigers	61–12	Bedford Blues

Welford Road
Attendance: 8,308

30 October 1999
15:00

Northampton Saints	9–25	Gloucester

Franklin’s Gardens
Attendance: 6,257

30 October 1999
19:30

London Wasps	19–19	Newcastle Falcons

Loftus Road
Attendance: 2,871

=== Week 8 ===
5 November 1999
19:30

Gloucester	35–14	Sale Sharks

Kingsholm
Attendance: 4,725

5 November 1999
19:30

Newcastle Falcons	12–12	Leicester Tigers

Kingston Park
Attendance: 2,835

5 November 1999
20:00

Bristol Shoguns	19–29	Northampton Saints

Memorial Stadium
Attendance: 3,500

6 November 1999
12:00

Bedford Blues	24–28	Bath Rugby

Goldington Road
Attendance: 2,119

7 November 1999
15:00

Saracens	27–26	London Wasps

Vicarage Road
Attendance: 8,517

7 November 1999
15:05

London Irish	16–17	NEC Harlequins

Twickenham Stoop
Attendance: 4,671

=== Week 9 ===
13 November 1999
14:15

Bath Rugby	45–12	Newcastle Falcons

Recreation Ground
Attendance: 6,400

13 November 1999
15:00

Leicester Tigers	28–9	London Wasps

Welford Road
Attendance: 10,043

13 November 1999
15:00

NEC Harlequins	11–10	Bedford Blues

Twickenham Stoop
Attendance: 2,753

13 November 1999
15:00

Northampton Saints	24–19	London Irish

Franklin’s Gardens
Attendance: 6,489

13 November 1999
16:00

Sale Sharks	15–40	Bristol Shoguns

Heywood Road
Attendance: 2,588

14 November 1999
15:00

Gloucester	22–19	Saracens

Kingsholm
Attendance: 9,084

=== Week 10 ===
4 December 1999
15:00

Bedford Blues	17–41	Northampton Saints

Goldington Road
Attendance: 4,306

4 December 1999
15:00

Bristol Shoguns	25–38	Gloucester

Memorial Stadium
Attendance: 7,620

4 December 1999
15:00

London Irish	26–3	Sale Sharks

Twickenham Stoop
Attendance: 3,716

5 December 1999
15:00

London Wasps	23–21	Bath Rugby

Loftus Road
Attendance: 6,012

5 December 1999
15:00

Newcastle Falcons	15–16	NEC Harlequins

Kingston Park
Attendance: 2,844

5 December 1999
18:30

Saracens	36–20	Leicester Tigers

Vicarage Road
Attendance: 8,182

=== Week 11 ===
23 December 1999
19:00

NEC Harlequins	16–52	London Wasps

Twickenham Stoop
Attendance: 4,046

26 December 1999
14:15

Bath Rugby	3–13	Leicester Tigers

Recreation Ground
Attendance: 8,200

26 December 1999
15:00

Gloucester	40–15	London Irish

Kingsholm
Attendance: 7,388

26 December 1999
15:00

Northampton Saints	37–5	Newcastle Falcons

Franklin’s Gardens
Attendance: 9,478

26 December 1999
15:00

Sale Sharks	22–3	Bedford Blues

Heywood Road
Attendance: 2,800

=== Week 12 ===
27 December 1999
13:00

Bristol Shoguns	45–22	Saracens

Memorial Stadium
Attendance: 6,420

29 December 1999
15:00

Leicester Tigers	29–17	NEC Harlequins

Welford Road
Attendance: 15,499

29 December 1999
19:30

London Irish	35–21	Bristol Shoguns

Twickenham Stoop
Attendance: 3,478

29 December 1999
19:30

Newcastle Falcons	12–6	Sale Sharks

Kingston Park
Attendance: 2,359

29 December 1999
19:45

London Wasps	15–21	Northampton Saints

Loftus Road
Attendance: 5,117

30 December 1999
15:00

Bedford Blues	6–18	Gloucester

Goldington Road
Attendance: 1,813

30 December 1999
15:00

Saracens	19–6	Bath Rugby

Vicarage Road
Attendance: 10,292

=== Week 13 ===
22 January 2000
14:00

Gloucester	29–23	Bristol Shoguns

Kingsholm
Attendance: 8,903

22 January 2000
14:15

Bath Rugby	27–16	London Wasps

Recreation Ground
Attendance: 7,300

22 January 2000
15:00

Leicester Tigers	48–20	Saracens

Welford Road
Attendance: 13,910

22 January 2000
15:00

NEC Harlequins	12–15	Newcastle Falcons

Twickenham Stoop
Attendance: 3,978

22 January 2000
15:00

Northampton Saints	38–16	Bedford Blues

Franklin’s Gardens
Attendance: 7,049

23 January 2000
14:00

Sale Sharks	24–31	London Irish

Heywood Road
Attendance: 2,900

=== Week 14 ===
25 January 2000
19:30

Bedford Blues	25–28	NEC Harlequins

Goldington Road
Attendance: 2,181

25 January 2000
19:30

Newcastle Falcons	16–20	Bath Rugby

Kingston Park
Attendance: 2,901

25 January 2000
19:45

Saracens	35–21	Gloucester

Vicarage Road
Attendance: 5,772

25 January 2000
20:00

London Wasps	20–29	Leicester Tigers

Loftus Road
Attendance: 5,168

26 January 2000
19:30

London Irish	20–44	Northampton Saints

Twickenham Stoop
Attendance: 4,229

=== Week 15 ===
12 February 2000
14:00

Northampton Saints	19–23	Bristol Shoguns

Franklin’s Gardens
Attendance: 7,228

12 February 2000
15:00

Bath Rugby	32–22	Bedford Blues

Recreation Ground
Attendance: 6,800

12 February 2000
15:00

Leicester Tigers	34–26	Newcastle Falcons

Welford Road
Attendance: 13,246

12 February 2000
15:00

NEC Harlequins	14–39	London Irish

Twickenham Stoop
Attendance: 7,588

12 February 2000
15:00

Sale Sharks	13–31	Gloucester

Heywood Road
Attendance: 3,079

13 February 2000
15:00

London Wasps	41–17	Saracens

Loftus Road
Attendance: 8,372

=== Week 16 ===
27 February 2000
15:00

Newcastle Falcons	23–20	Bedford Blues

Kingston Park
Attendance: 2,403

=== Week 17 ===
8 March 2000
19:30

Bristol Shoguns	35–16	Sale Sharks

Memorial Stadium
Attendance: 2,656

11 March 2000
14:00

Gloucester	11–35	Northampton Saints

Kingsholm
Attendance: 9,381

11 March 2000
15:00

Bedford Blues	22–32	Leicester Tigers

Goldington Road
Attendance: 4,722

11 March 2000
15:00

Bristol Shoguns	42–39	NEC Harlequins

Memorial Stadium
Attendance: 3,825

11 March 2000
15:00

London Irish	16–64	Bath Rugby

Twickenham Stoop
Attendance: 7,174

12 March 2000
15:00

Newcastle Falcons	8–34	London Wasps

Kingston Park
Attendance: 4,260

12 March 2000
15:00

Saracens	56–28	Sale Sharks

Vicarage Road
Attendance: 6,112

=== Week 18 ===
25 March 2000
14:15

Bath Rugby	39–13	Bristol Shoguns

Recreation Ground
Attendance: 8,500

25 March 2000
15:00

Leicester Tigers	41–16	London Irish

Welford Road
Attendance: 13,247

25 March 2000
15:00

NEC Harlequins	24–38	Gloucester

Twickenham Stoop
Attendance: 4,127

25 March 2000
15:00

Northampton Saints	26–7	Sale Sharks

Franklin’s Gardens
Attendance: 7,460

26 March 2000
15:00

London Wasps	62–8	Bedford Blues

Loftus Road
Attendance: 4,932

26 March 2000
15:00

Newcastle Falcons	15–6	Saracens

Kingston Park
Attendance: 3,950

=== Week 19 ===
8 April 2000
15:00

Bedford Blues	32–22	Newcastle Falcons

Goldington Road
Attendance: 3,165

8 April 2000
15:00

Gloucester	16–36	Bath Rugby

Kingsholm
Attendance: 9,500

8 April 2000
15:00

Sale Sharks	36–20	NEC Harlequins

Heywood Road
Attendance: 2,398

=== Week 20 ===
15 April 2000
14:15

Bath Rugby	36–6	Sale Sharks

Recreation Ground
Attendance: 5,300

16 April 2000
15:00

Bedford Blues	29–57	Saracens

Goldington Road
Attendance: 3,067

=== Week 21 ===
18 April 2000
19:30

Newcastle Falcons	28–23	London Irish

Kingston Park
Attendance: 2,880

18 April 2000
19:45

Leicester Tigers	24–13	Gloucester

Welford Road
Attendance: 14,850

19 April 2000
19:30

NEC Harlequins	29–17	Northampton Saints

Twickenham Stoop
Attendance: 3,500

19 April 2000
19:45

London Wasps	25–31	Bristol Shoguns

Loftus Road
Attendance: 3,257

22 April 2000
15:00

Gloucester	26–12	London Wasps

Kingsholm
Attendance: 6,040

22 April 2000
15:00

London Irish	33–23	Bedford Blues

Twickenham Stoop
Attendance: 3,108

22 April 2000
15:00

Northampton Saints	13–17	Bath Rugby

Franklin’s Gardens
Attendance: 8,972

22 April 2000
15:00

Sale Sharks	13–48	Leicester Tigers

Heywood Road
Attendance: 3,443

23 April 2000
15:00

Bristol Shoguns	30–11	Newcastle Falcons

Memorial Stadium
Attendance: 4,126

=== Week 22 ===
24 April 2000
15:00

Saracens	50–10	NEC Harlequins

Vicarage Road
Attendance: 8,352

26 April 2000
19:30

Bedford Blues	7–21	London Wasps

Goldington Road
Attendance: 2,283

29 April 2000
15:00

Bath Rugby	77–19	NEC Harlequins

Recreation Ground
Attendance: 8,200

29 April 2000
15:00

Bedford Blues	19–57	Bristol Shoguns

Goldington Road
Attendance: 2,093

29 April 2000
15:00

Leicester Tigers	26–21	Northampton Saints

Welford Road
Attendance: 16,880

29 April 2000
15:00

London Irish	27–41	Saracens

Twickenham Stoop
Attendance: 6,067

30 April 2000
15:00

London Wasps	58–5	Sale Sharks

Loftus Road
Attendance: 3,499

30 April 2000
15:00

Newcastle Falcons	36–28	Gloucester

Kingston Park
Attendance: 4,380

=== Week 23 ===
6 May 2000
15:00

Bath Rugby	40–27	Saracens

Recreation Ground
Attendance: 8,200

6 May 2000
15:00

Gloucester	60–16	Bedford Blues

Kingsholm
Attendance: 4,402

6 May 2000
15:00

NEC Harlequins	5–54	Leicester Tigers

Twickenham Stoop
Attendance: 5,628

6 May 2000
15:00

Sale Sharks	45–17	Newcastle Falcons

Heywood Road
Attendance: 2,478

=== Week 24 ===
9 May 2000
15:00

Northampton Saints	12–54	London Wasps

Franklin’s Gardens
Attendance: 5,617

10 May 2000
20:00

Bristol Shoguns	28–26	London Irish

Memorial Stadium
Attendance: 3,429

14 May 2000
15:00

Bedford Blues	37–50	Sale Sharks

Goldington Road
Attendance: 1,486

14 May 2000
15:00

Bristol Shoguns	23–30	Leicester Tigers

Memorial Stadium
Attendance: 7,775

=== Week 25 ===
17 May 2000
19:45

London Irish	45–24	London Wasps

Twickenham Stoop
Attendance: 2,801

17 May 2000
19:45

Saracens	29–24	Northampton Saints

Vicarage Road
Attendance: 5,592

20 May 2000
15:00

London Irish	40–42	Gloucester

Twickenham Stoop
Attendance: 5,172

21 May 2000
15:00

Leicester Tigers	43–25	Bath Rugby

Welford Road
Attendance: 17,109

21 May 2000
15:00

London Wasps	35–32	NEC Harlequins

Loftus Road
Attendance: 6,175

21 May 2000
15:00

Newcastle Falcons	23–32	Northampton Saints

Kingston Park
Attendance: 4,000

21 May 2000
15:00

Saracens	37–10	Bristol Shoguns

Vicarage Road
Attendance: 8,988

== Promotion/Relegation Playoff ==
12th place Bedford faced 1999–00 Premiership 2 champions Rotherham in a two legged playoff to see who was promoted or relegated.

24 May 2000

Rotherham	40–20	Bedford

Clifton Lane

28 May 2000

Bedford	14–0	Rotherham

Goldington Road

- Rotherham win 40–34 on aggregate and are promoted to 2000–01 Premiership Rugby.

== Attendances ==
Club	Home Games	Total	Average	Highest	Lowest	% Capacity
Bath	11	76,700	6,973	8,500	5,000	82%
Bedford	11	29,894	2,718	4,722	1,486	42%
Bristol	11	54,541	4,958	7,775	2,656	58%
Gloucester	11	75,023	6,820	9,500	4,402	57%
Harlequins	11	47,450	4,314	7,588	2,322	48%
Leicester Tigers	11	139,598	12,691	17,109	7,785	74%
London Irish	11	48,072	4,370	7,174	2,801	49%
Newcastle Falcons	11	36,154	3,287	4,380	2,359	41%
Northampton Saints	11	80,100	7,282	9,512	5,617	73%
Sale Sharks	11	30,396	2,763	3,443	2,210	58%
Saracens	11	79,760	7,251	10,292	4,513	33%
Wasps	11	54,096	4,918	8,372	2,871	27%

== Leading scorers ==
Note: Flags to the left of player names indicate national team as has been defined under World Rugby eligibility rules, or primary nationality for players who did not earn international senior caps. Players may hold one or more non-WR nationalities.

=== Most points ===
Rank	Player	Club	Points
1	(New Zealand) Jarrod Cunningham	London Irish	324
2	(England) Tim Stimpson	Leicester Tigers	321
3	(New Zealand) Simon Mannix	Gloucester	285
4	(France) Thierry Lacroix	Saracens	280
5	(New Zealand) Jon Preston	Bath	182
6	(South Africa) Henry Honiball	Bristol	178
7	(England) Jonny Wilkinson	Newcastle Falcons	163
8	(Scotland) Kenny Logan	Wasps	136
9	(England) Jon Callard	Bath	133
10	(England) Alex King	Wasps	125

=== Most tries ===
Rank	Player	Club	Tries
1	(England) Iain Balshaw	Bath	15
2	(Australia) Ryan Constable	Saracens	12
3	(Ireland) Darragh O'Mahony	Saracens	11
4	(Canada) Dave Lougheed	Leicester Tigers	10
4	(Ireland) Conor O'Shea	London Irish	10
6	(England) Chris Catling	Gloucester	9
6	(Ireland) Rob Henderson	Wasps	9
6	(England) Josh Lewsey	Wasps	9
6	(England) Elton Moncrieff	Gloucester	9
6	(Ireland) Geordan Murphy	Leicester Tigers	9
6	(England) Paul Sackey	Bedford	9

== See also ==
- 1999–00 Premiership 2
- 1999–00 National League 1
- 1999–00 National League 2 North
- 1999–00 National League 2 South
