= 2000–01 National Division Two =

Sports season

- Countries: England
- Champions: Bracknell
- Runners-up: Rugby Lions (also promoted)
- Relegated: West Hartlepool, Lydney, Camberley
- Attendance: 38,518 (average 363 per match) (Note: Note that 76 home attendances are missing (see below) - so the total attendance will not be 100% accurate. The average attendance has also been taken into account with the missing games not included.)
- Highest attendance: 1,000 – Rosslyn Park v Rugby, 24 February 2001
- Lowest attendance: 50 – West Hartlepool v Camberley, 31 March 2001
- Top point scorer: 290 – Mike Scott (Kendal)
- Top try scorer: 17 – Ed Smithies, (Harrogate)

The 2000–01 National Division Two was the fourteenth full season of rugby union within the third tier of the English league system currently known as National League 1. New teams to the division included West Hartlepool and Rugby Lions who were relegated from the 1999–2000 Allied Dunbar Premiership Two while promoted teams included Kendal and Esher who were promoted as champions of National Division Three North and National Division Three South respectively. The league system was 2 points for a win and 1 point for a draw.

The league champions were Bracknell who won the title by five points and gained promotion to the 2001–02 National Division One. They would be joined by runners up Rugby Lions (making an instant return to the division) who squeaked past Rosslyn Park despite being level on points due to a better points for/conceded record. At the other end of the table West Hartlepool, Lydney and Camberley would be the unfortunate teams to be relegated. West Hartlepool were easily the worse team in the division, failing to win a single game all season and suffering their second successive relegation in a row (part of a slide that would see them drop out of the national league system into regional rugby) while Lydney went down having only played 22 games due to fixture congestion/cancellations – although even if the Gloucestershire-based side won these remaining fixtures it would not have been enough to keep them up. West Hartlepool would drop to the 2001–02 National Division Three North while Camberley and Lydney would drop to the 2001–02 National Division Three South.

== Participating teams and locations ==
2000–01 National Division Two teams in England

Team	Stadium	Capacity	City/Area	Previous season
Bracknell	Lily Hill Park	1,000	Bracknell, Berkshire	7th
Camberley	Watchetts Recreation Ground	2,000	Camberley, Surrey	12th
Esher	Molesey Road	3,000	Hersham, Surrey	Promoted from National 2 South (1st)
Fylde	Woodlands Memorial Ground	7,500 (500 seats)	Lytham St. Annes, Lancashire	9th
Harrogate	Claro Road	4,500 (500 seats)	Harrogate, North Yorkshire	6th
Kendal	Mint Bridge	4,600 (600 seats)	Kendal, Cumbria	Promoted from National 2 North (1st)
Lydney	Regentsholme	3,000 (340 seats)	Lydney, Gloucestershire	10th
Newbury Blues	Monk's Lane	8,000	Newbury, Berkshire	5th
Nottingham	Ireland Avenue	4,990 (590 seats)	Beeston, Nottinghamshire	11th
Preston Grasshoppers	Lightfoot Green	2,250 (250 seats)	Preston, Lancashire	8th
Rosslyn Park	The Rock	2,000 (630 seats) (Note: The Rock capacity revised down from 1990s estimate of 4,630 to 2,000..)	Roehampton, London	4th
Rugby Lions	Webb Ellis Road	3,200 (200 seats)	Rugby, Warwickshire	Relegated from Premiership 2 (13th)
West Hartlepool	Brinkburn	1,000 (76 seats)	Hartlepool, County Durham	Relegated from Premiership 2 (14th)
Wharfedale	The Avenue	2,000	Threshfield, Craven, North Yorkshire	3rd

== Final league table ==
2000–01 National Division Two table
Pos	Team	Pld	W	D	L	PF	PA	PD	Pts
1	Bracknell (C, P)	26	22	0	4	752	310	+442	44
2	Rugby Lions (P)	25	19	2	4	888	320	+568	40
3	Rosslyn Park	25	19	2	4	752	439	+313	40
4	Kendal	26	16	1	9	622	467	+155	33
5	Harrogate	26	14	2	10	617	442	+175	30
6	Wharfedale	25	14	0	11	594	475	+119	28
7	Preston Grasshoppers	26	12	2	12	569	517	+52	26
8	Esher	26	11	1	14	577	484	+93	23
9	Newbury Blues	25	10	1	14	437	502	−65	21
10	Fylde	26	11	1	14	377	594	−217	21 (Note: 2 points deducted?)
11	Nottingham	26	10	0	16	544	584	−40	20
12	Camberley (R)	26	8	0	18	426	738	−312	16
13	Lydney (R)	22	6	0	16	308	565	−257	12
14	West Hartlepool (R)	26	0	0	26	240	1266	−1026	0

Updated to match(es) played on 28 April 2001. Source: englandrugby.com
(C) Champions; (P) Promoted; (R) Relegated

== Results ==
Some of the early-season scores from Rugby Statbunker are incorrect (possibly due to an automatic scoring system used on that website) as they are different from those reported in the Telegraph. I have used scores from the England Rugby website to ensure that they are accurate with reports from Statbunker primarily used to show scorers, attendances and referees were relevant. Statbunker scores are consistent with rest of sources from 16 December 2000 onwards.

=== Round 1 ===
2 September 2000

Bracknell	18 - 15	Camberley
	Report

Lily Hill Park

2 September 2000

Esher	6 - 21	Kendal
	Report

Molesey Road
Attendance: 450
Referee: S Leyshon

2 September 2000

Harrogate	12 - 19	Rugby Lions
	Report

Claro Road
Attendance: 450
Referee: David Pearson

2 September 2000

Lydney	9 - 22	Preston Grasshoppers
	Report

Regentsholme
Attendance: 500
Referee: Andrew Pearce

2 September 2000

Nottingham	14 - 26	Newbury Blues
	Report

Ireland Avenue
Referee: Nick Cousins

2 September 2000

Rosslyn Park	33 - 12	Wharfedale
	Report

The Rock
Referee: Rob Sawyer

2 September 2000

West Hartlepool	3 - 16	Fylde
	Report

Brinkburn
Attendance: 285
Referee: S Makinson

=== Round 2 ===
9 September 2000

Esher	14 - 12	Bracknell
	Report

Molesey Road
Attendance: 500
Referee: R Glynne Jones

9 September 2000

Fylde	16 - 24	Camberley
	Report

Woodlands Memorial Ground
Attendance: 400
Referee: Tony Spreadbury

9 September 2000

Kendal	10 - 33	Harrogate

Mint Bridge
Attendance: 700

9 September 2000

Newbury Blues	17 - 26	Rosslyn Park
	Report

Monk's Lane

9 September 2000

Preston Grasshoppers	17 - 32	Nottingham
	Report

Lightfoot Green
Attendance: 350
Referee: David Matthews

9 September 2000

Rugby Lions	34 - 10	Lydney
	Report

Webb Ellis Road
Referee: S Terheege

9 September 2000

Wharfedale	51 - 14	West Hartlepool
	Report

The Avenue
Referee: Mike Hamlin

=== Round 3 ===
16 September 2000

Bracknell	34 - 21	Fylde
	Report

Lily Hill Park
Referee: Charles Palmer

16 September 2000

Harrogate	31 - 10	Esher
	Report

Claro Road
Attendance: 400
Referee: D Edmunds

16 September 2000

Lydney	20 - 16	Kendal
	Report

Regentsholme

16 September 2000

Nottingham	15 - 12	Rugby Lions
	Report

Ireland Avenue
Referee: Andrew Pearce

16 September 2000

Rosslyn Park	47 - 19	Preston Grasshoppers
	Report

The Rock
Referee: Tony Spreadbury

16 September 2000

West Hartlepool	3 - 34	Newbury Blues
	Report

Brinkburn
Referee: Rob Sawyer

16 September 2000

Camberley	P - P	Wharfedale

- Postponed. Game rescheduled to 3 February 2001.

=== Round 4 ===
23 September 2000

Esher	30 - 17	Lydney
	Report

Molesey Road
Attendance: 450
Referee: Wayne Barnes

23 September 2000

Harrogate	28 - 27	Bracknell
	Report

Claro Road
Attendance: 350
Referee: Stuart Piercy

23 September 2000

Kendal	25 - 12	Nottingham
	Report

Mint Bridge
Referee: Mike Hamlin

23 September 2000

Newbury Blues	39 - 13	Camberley
	Report

Monk's Lane
Attendance: 300
Referee: Steve Harland

23 September 2000

Preston Grasshoppers	25 - 22	West Hartlepool
	Report

Lightfoot Green
Attendance: 320
Referee: Mark Wilson

23 September 2000

Rugby Lions	31 - 10	Rosslyn Park
	Report

Webb Ellis Road
Referee: S Makinson

23 September 2000

Wharfedale	72 - 10	Fylde
	Report

The Avenue
Referee: Chris Seeley

=== Round 5 ===
30 September 2000

Bracknell	23 - 17	Wharfedale
	Report

Lily Hill Park
Referee: Andrew Pearce

30 September 2000

Camberley	8 - 33	Preston Grasshoppers
	Report

Watchetts Recreation Ground
Attendance: 200
Referee: Nick Cousins

30 September 2000

Fylde	12 - 6	Newbury Blues
	Report

Woodlands Memorial Ground
Attendance: 450
Referee: Doug Chapman

30 September 2000

Lydney	3 - 24	Harrogate
	Report

Regentsholme
Attendance: 200
Referee: R Glynne Jones

30 September 2000

Nottingham	20 - 18	Esher
	Report

Ireland Avenue
Referee: Chris Seeley

30 September 2000

Rosslyn Park	25 - 29	Kendal
	Report

The Rock

30 September 2000

West Hartlepool	8 - 57	Rugby Lions
	Report

Brinkburn
Referee: D Edmunds

=== Round 6 ===
14 October 2000

Bracknell	26 - 11	Newbury Blues
	Report

Lily Hill Park

14 October 2000

Camberley	13 - 15	Kendal
	Report

Watchetts Recreation Ground
Attendance: 250
Referee: Mark Rose

14 October 2000

Fylde	14 - 13	Rugby Lions
	Report

Woodlands Memorial Ground
Referee: Mark Wilson

14 October 2000

Nottingham	44 - 22	Lydney
	Report

Ireland Avenue
Attendance: 298
Referee: Huw Jones-Williams

14 October 2000

Rosslyn Park	19 - 17	Harrogate
	Report

The Rock
Attendance: 600
Referee: Nick Cousins

14 October 2000

West Hartlepool	5 - 47	Esher
	Report

Brinkburn
Referee: David Matthews

14 October 2000

Wharfedale	17 - 14	Preston Grasshoppers
	Report

The Avenue
Attendance: 550
Referee: Alan Hughes

=== Round 7 ===
28 October 2000

Bracknell	28 - 7	Preston Grasshoppers
	Report

Lily Hill Park

28 October 2000

Camberley	16 - 15	Harrogate
	Report

Watchetts Recreation Ground
Attendance: 150
Referee: Watchetts Ground

28 October 2000

Fylde	14 - 20	Esher
	Report

Woodlands Memorial Ground
Referee: Rob Debney

28 October 2000

Newbury Blues	22 - 19	Rugby Lions
	Report

Monk's Lane
Referee: R Glynne Jones

28 October 2000

Rosslyn Park	35 - 24	Nottingham
	Report

The Rock
Referee: D May

28 October 2000

West Hartlepool	13 - 18	Lydney
	Report

Brinkburn
Referee: Wayne Barnes

28 October 2000

Wharfedale	14 - 21	Kendal
	Report

The Avenue
Referee: Mark Wilson

=== Round 8 ===
4 November 2000

Harrogate	60 - 0	West Hartlepool
	Report

Claro Road
Attendance: 250
Referee: S Makinson

4 November 2000

Esher	P - P	Camberley

- Postponed. Game rescheduled to 30 December 2000.

4 November 2000

Kendal	P - P	Fylde

- Postponed. Game rescheduled to 30 December 2000.

4 November 2000

Lydney	P - P	Rosslyn Park

- Postponed. Game rescheduled to 30 December 2000.

4 November 2000

Nottingham	P - P	Bracknell

- Postponed. Game rescheduled to 30 December 2000.

4 November 2000

Preston Grasshoppers	P - P	Newbury Blues

- Postponed. Game rescheduled to 30 December 2000.

4 November 2000

Rugby Lions	P - P	Wharfedale

- Postponed. Game rescheduled to 30 December 2000.

=== Round 9 ===
11 November 2000

Esher	20 - 22	Wharfedale
	Report

Molesey Road
Attendance: 150
Referee: Tim Miller

11 November 2000

Harrogate	31 - 17	Fylde
	Report

Claro Road
Attendance: 450
Referee: Stuart Piercy

11 November 2000

Kendal	18 - 0	Newbury Blues
	Report

Mint Bridge
Attendance: 400
Referee: Steve Savage

11 November 2000

Lydney	18 - 16	Camberley
	Report

Regentsholme
Attendance: 200
Referee: R Glynne Jones

11 November 2000

Rosslyn Park	19 - 33	Bracknell
	Report

The Rock

11 November 2000

Rugby Lions	20 - 8	Preston Grasshoppers
	Report

Webb Ellis Road

11 November 2000

Nottingham	P - P	West Hartlepool

- Postponed. Game rescheduled to 3 February 2001.

=== Round 10 ===
18 November 2000

Bracknell	9 - 6	Rugby Lions
	Report

Lily Hill Park

18 November 2000

Fylde	13 - 18	Lydney
	Report

Woodlands Memorial Ground
Attendance: 450
Referee: Alan Hughes

18 November 2000

Newbury Blues	19 - 18	Esher
	Report

Monk's Lane
Referee: D May

18 November 2000

Preston Grasshoppers	25 - 18	Kendal
	Report

Lightfoot Green
Attendance: 630

18 November 2000

West Hartlepool	31 - 43	Rosslyn Park
	Report

Brinkburn
Referee: Mark Wilson

18 November 2000

Wharfedale	25 - 0	Harrogate
	Report

The Avenue
Attendance: 700
Referee: David Matthews

18 November 2000

Camberley	P - P	Nottingham

- Postponed. Game rescheduled to 17 February 2001.

=== Round 11 ===
25 November 2000

Harrogate	17 - 9	Newbury Blues
	Report

Claro Road
Attendance: 300
Referee: Chris Seeley

25 November 2000

Kendal	17 - 17	Rugby Lions
	Report

Mint Bridge
Attendance: 400
Referee: Mike Hamlin

25 November 2000

Lydney	0 - 9	Wharfedale
	Report

Regentsholme
Attendance: 400
Referee: D Edmunds

25 November 2000

Nottingham	15 - 17	Fylde
	Report

Ireland Avenue
Referee: Mark Wilson

25 November 2000

Rosslyn Park	23 - 10	Camberley
	Report

The Rock
Attendance: 200
Referee: Andrew Pearce

25 November 2000

West Hartlepool	10 - 30	Bracknell
	Report

Brinkburn
Referee: Stuart Piercy

25 November 2000

Esher	P - P	Preston Grasshoppers

- Postponed. Game rescheduled to 3 February 2001.

=== Round 12 ===
2 December 2000

Esher	10 - 10	Rosslyn Park
	Report

Molesey Road
Attendance: 200
Referee: Huw Jones-Williams

2 December 2000

Harrogate	38 - 16	Nottingham
	Report

Claro Road
Attendance: 300
Referee: S Makinson

2 December 2000

Newbury Blues	10 - 25	Wharfedale
	Report

Monk's Lane
Referee: Wayne Barnes

2 December 2000

Preston Grasshoppers	17 - 9	Fylde
	Report

Lightfoot Green
Attendance: 550
Referee: Chris Seeley

2 December 2000

Rugby Lions	80 - 13	Camberley
	Report

Webb Ellis Road
Attendance: 200
Referee: Rob Debney

2 December 2000

Lydney	P - P	Bracknell

- Postponed. Game rescheduled to 3 February 2001.

2 December 2000

West Hartlepool	P - P	Kendal

- Postponed. Game rescheduled to 17 February 2001.

=== Round 13 ===
9 December 2000

Bracknell	31 - 15	Kendal
	Report

Lily Hill Park

9 December 2000

Camberley	22 - 11	West Hartlepool
	Report

Watchetts Recreation Ground
Attendance: 100
Referee: Steve Savage

9 December 2000

Fylde	21 - 16	Rosslyn Park
	Report

Woodlands Memorial Ground
Referee: R Glynne Jones

9 December 2000

Newbury Blues	24 - 12	Lydney
	Report

Monk's Lane
Referee: Rob Debney

9 December 2000

Preston Grasshoppers	22 - 22	Harrogate
	Report

Lightfoot Green
Attendance: 450
Referee: Wayne Barnes

9 December 2000

Rugby Lions	34 - 14	Esher
	Report

Webb Ellis Road
Referee: Nick Cousins

9 December 2000

Wharfedale	12 - 21	Nottingham
	Report

The Avenue
Referee: Chris Seeley

=== Round 14 ===
16 December 2000

Harrogate	18 - 20	Wharfedale
	Report

Claro Road
Attendance: 600
Referee: Mark Wilson

16 December 2000

Kendal	20 -14	Preston Grasshoppers
	Report

Mint Bridge
Referee: Rob Debney

16 December 2000

Lydney	9 - 13	Fylde
	Report

Regentsholme

16 December 2000

Nottingham	33 - 12	Camberley
	Report

Ireland Avenue
Attendance: 300
Referee: Mike Hamlin

16 December 2000

Rosslyn Park	78 - 7	West Hartlepool
	Report

The Rock

16 December 2000

Rugby Lions	43 - 7	Bracknell
	Report

Webb Ellis Road
Attendance: 400
Referee: Nick Cousins

16 December 2000

Esher	P - P	Newbury Blues

- Postponed. Game rescheduled to 17 February 2001.

=== Round 15 ===
23 December 2000

Bracknell	16 - 18	Rosslyn Park
	Report

Lily Hill Park

23 December 2000

Camberley	32 - 3	Lydney
	Report

Watchetts Recreation Ground
Attendance: 200
Referee: Huw Jones-Williams

23 December 2000

Fylde	12 - 18	Harrogate
	Report

Woodlands Memorial Ground
Referee: D Edmunds

23 December 2000

Newbury Blues	35 - 12	Kendal
	Report

Monk's Lane
Referee: Nigel Higginson

23 December 2000

Preston Grasshoppers	10 - 27	Rugby Lions
	Report

Lightfoot Green
Referee: Tim Wigglesworth

23 December 2000

West Hartlepool	5 - 45	Nottingham
	Report

Brinkburn
Referee: David Pearson

23 December 2000

Wharfedale	33 - 22	Esher
	Report

The Avenue
Referee: Stuart Piercy

=== Round 8 (rescheduled games) ===
30 December 2000

Esher	P - P	Camberley

- Game originally rescheduled from 4 November 2000 but postponed once again. Game rescheduled to 3 March 2001.

30 December 2000

Kendal	P - P	Fylde

- Game originally rescheduled from 4 November 2000 but postponed once again. Game rescheduled to 3 March 2001.

30 December 2000

Lydney	C - C	Rosslyn Park

- Game originally rescheduled from 4 November 2000 and was initially postponed once again - eventually being cancelled due to fixture congestion and the result being irrelevant to Lydney's eventual relegation.

30 December 2000

Nottingham	P - P	Bracknell

- Game originally rescheduled from 4 November 2000 but postponed once again. Game rescheduled to 3 March 2001.

30 December 2000

Preston Grasshoppers	P - P	Newbury Blues

- Game originally rescheduled from 4 November 2000 but postponed once again. Game rescheduled to 3 March 2001.

30 December 2000

Rugby Lions	P - P	Wharfedale

- Game originally rescheduled from 4 November 2000 but postponed once again. Game rescheduled to 17 February 2001.

=== Round 16 ===
6 January 2001

Esher	29 - 10	Fylde
	Report

Molesey Road
Attendance: 400
Referee: Huw Jones-Williams

6 January 2001

Harrogate	49 - 5	Camberley
	Report

Claro Road
Attendance: 400
Referee: Stuart Piercy

6 January 2001

Kendal	6 - 0	Wharfedale
	Report

Mint Bridge
Referee: David Matthews

6 January 2001

Lydney	58 - 8	West Hartlepool
	Report

Regentsholme

6 January 2001

Nottingham	31 - 40	Rosslyn Park
	Report

Ireland Avenue
Referee: Steve Savage

6 January 2001

Preston Grasshoppers	17 - 40	Bracknell
	Report

Lightfoot Green
Referee: 450

6 January 2001

Rugby Lions	24 - 3	Newbury Blues
	Report

Webb Ellis Road
Referee: David Pearson

=== Round 17 ===
13 January 2001

Bracknell	48 - 3	Nottingham
	Report

Lily Hill Park
Referee: Mark Rose

13 January 2001

Camberley	22 - 33	Esher
	Report

Watchetts Recreation Ground
Attendance: 150
Referee: Nigel Higginson

13 January 2001

Fylde	17 - 13	Kendal
	Report

Woodlands Memorial Ground
Referee: S Makinson

13 January 2001

Newbury Blues	10 - 25	Preston Grasshoppers
	Report

Monk's Lane
Referee: Wayne Barnes

13 January 2001

Rosslyn Park	60 - 7	Lydney
	Report

The Rock

13 January 2001

West Hartlepool	14 - 70	Harrogate
	Report

Brinkburn
Attendance: 150
Referee: Tim Wigglesworth

13 January 2001

Wharfedale	24 - 31	Rugby Lions
	Report

The Avenue
Referee: D Edmunds

=== Round 18 ===
20 January 2001

Lydney	21 - 28	Nottingham
	Report

Regentsholme
Attendance: 400
Referee: Alan Biggs

20 January 2001

Esher	P - P	West Hartlepool

- Postponed. Game rescheduled to 8 April 2001.

20 January 2001

Harrogate	P - P	Rosslyn Park

- Postponed. Game rescheduled to 3 February 2001.

20 January 2001

Kendal	P - P	Camberley

- Postponed. Game rescheduled to 7 April 2001.

20 January 2001

Newbury Blues	P - P	Bracknell

- Postponed. Game rescheduled to 7 April 2001.

20 January 2001

Preston Grasshoppers	P - P	Wharfedale

- Postponed. Game rescheduled to 7 April 2001.

20 January 2001

Rugby Lions	P - P	Fylde

- Postponed. Game rescheduled to 6 April 2001.

=== Round 19 ===
27 January 2001

Bracknell	25 - 3	Lydney
	Report

Lily Hill Park

27 January 2001

Fylde	20 - 12	Preston Grasshoppers
	Report

Woodlands Memorial Ground
Referee: Chris Seeley

27 January 2001

Kendal	92 - 0	West Hartlepool
	Report

Mint Bridge

27 January 2001

Nottingham	3 - 10	Harrogate
	Report

Ireland Avenue

27 January 2001

Rosslyn Park	22 - 19	Esher
	Report

The Rock
Referee: D May

27 January 2001

Wharfedale	37 - 7	Newbury Blues
	Report

The Avenue
Referee: S Makinson

27 January 2001

Camberley	P - P	Rugby Lions

- Postponed. Game rescheduled to 21 April 2001.

=== Rounds 3, 9, 11, 12 & 18 (rescheduled games) ===
3 February 2001

Camberley	24 - 30	Wharfedale
	Report

Watchetts Recreation Ground
Attendance: 80

- Game rescheduled from 16 September 2000.

3 February 2001

Esher	30 - 21	Preston Grasshoppers
	Report

Molesey Road
Attendance: 200
Referee: Paul Dix

- Game rescheduled from 25 November 2000.

3 February 2001

Harrogate	10 - 15	Rosslyn Park
	Report

Claro Road
Attendance: 550
Referee: David Pearson

- Game rescheduled from 20 January 2001.

3 February 2001

Lydney	8 - 36	Bracknell
	Report

Regentsholme
Attendance: 480

- Game rescheduled from 2 December 2000.

3 February 2001

Nottingham	48 - 15	West Hartlepool
	Report

Ireland Avenue
Attendance: 230
Referee: D Edmunds

- Game rescheduled from 11 November 2000.

=== Round 20 ===
10 February 2001

Esher	20 - 5	Nottingham
	Report

Molesey Road
Attendance: 250
Referee: Eric Woodmason

10 February 2001

Harrogate	29 - 16	Lydney
	Report

Claro Road
Attendance: 350
Referee: Richard Parker-Sedgmore

10 February 2001

Newbury Blues	10 - 10	Fylde
	Report

Monk's Lane
Referee: David Grashoff

10 February 2001

Preston Grasshoppers	15 - 21	Camberley
	Report

Lightfoot Green
Referee: David Matthews

10 February 2001

Rugby Lions	69 - 0	West Hartlepool
	Report

Webb Ellis Road
Referee: Nick Cousins

10 February 2001

Wharfedale	6 - 22	Bracknell
	Report

The Avenue
Referee: Steve Savage

10 February 2001

Kendal	P - P	Rosslyn Park

- Postponed. Game rescheduled to 21 April 2001.

=== Rounds 8, 10, 12 & 14 (rescheduled games) ===
17 February 2001

Camberley	24 - 15	Nottingham
	Report

Watchetts Recreation Ground
Attendance: 150
Referee: Rob Debney

- Game rescheduled from 18 November 2000.

17 February 2001

Esher	31 - 5	Newbury Blues
	Report

Molesey Road
Attendance: 250
Referee: S Terheege

- Game rescheduled from 16 December 2000.

17 February 2001

Rugby Lions	37 - 18	Wharfedale
	Report

Webb Ellis Road
Attendance: 300
Referee: Nigel Yates

- Game rescheduled from 30 December 2000.

17 February 2001

West Hartlepool	11 - 42	Kendal
	Report

Brinkburn
Attendance: 80
Referee: Stuart Piercy

- Game rescheduled from 2 December 2000.

=== Round 21 ===
24 February 2001

Bracknell	42 - 5	Harrogate
	Report

Lily Hill Park
Attendance: 200
Referee: Martin Fox

24 February 2001

Camberley	23 - 16	Newbury Blues
	Report

Watchetts Recreation Ground
Attendance: 200
Referee: Paul Dix

24 February 2001

Fylde	29 - 8	Wharfedale
	Report

Woodlands Memorial Ground
Attendance: 500
Referee: David Matthews

24 February 2001

Lydney	9 - 6	Esher
	Report

Regentsholme
Attendance: 580

24 February 2001

Nottingham	25 - 27	Kendal
	Report

Ireland Avenue
Attendance: 320

24 February 2001

Rosslyn Park	19 - 19	Rugby Lions
	Report

The Rock
Attendance: 1,000
Referee: Andrew Pearce

24 February 2001

West Hartlepool	P - P	Preston Grasshoppers

- Postponed. Game rescheduled to 21 April 2001.

=== Round 8 (rescheduled games) ===
3 March 2001

Esher	27 - 10	Camberley
	Report

Molesey Road
Attendance: 250
Referee: Wayne Barnes

- Game rescheduled from 30 December 2000.

3 March 2001

Nottingham	7 - 22	Bracknell
	Report

Ireland Avenue
Attendance: 145
Referee: David Sainsbury

- Game rescheduled from 30 December 2000.

3 March 2001

Preston Grasshoppers	27 - 17	Newbury Blues
	Report

Lightfoot Green
Attendance: 280

- Game rescheduled from 30 December 2000.

=== Round 22 ===
10 March 2001

Esher	23 - 25	Harrogate
	Report

Molesey Road
Attendance: 200
Referee: Steve Savage

10 March 2001

Fylde	6 - 17	Bracknell
	Report

Woodlands Memorial Ground
Referee: Mark Wilson

10 March 2001

Kendal	33 - 9	Lydney
	Report

Mint Bridge
Attendance: 450

10 March 2001

Newbury Blues	53 - 3	West Hartlepool
	Report

Monk's Lane
Attendance: 450
Referee: Huw Jones-Williams

10 March 2001

Preston Grasshoppers	20 - 24	Rosslyn Park
	Report

Lightfoot Green
Attendance: 310

10 March 2001

Rugby Lions	29 - 17	Nottingham
	Report

Webb Ellis Road
Attendance: 300
Referee: S Terheege

10 March 2001

Wharfedale	P - P	Camberley

- Postponed. Game rescheduled to 28 April 2001.

=== Round 23 ===
17 March 2001

Bracknell	16 - 0	Esher
	Report

Lily Hill Park
Attendance: 200
Referee: Rob Debney

17 March 2001

Camberley	24 - 28	Fylde
	Report

Watchetts Recreation Ground
Attendance: 100

17 March 2001

Harrogate	17 - 41	Kendal
	Report

Claro Road
Attendance: 350
Referee: R Glynne Jones

17 March 2001

Nottingham	15 - 37	Preston Grasshoppers
	Report

Ireland Avenue
Attendance: 250
Referee: David Rose

17 March 2001

Rosslyn Park	31 - 16	Newbury Blues
	Report

The Rock
Attendance: 650

17 March 2001

West Hartlepool	18 - 44	Wharfedale
	Report

Brinkburn
Attendance: 270
Referee: Stuart Piercy

17 March 2001

Lydney	C - C	Rugby Lions

- Game was initially postponed but would eventually be cancelled due to fixture congestion and the result being irrelevant to Lydney's eventual relegation.

=== Round 24 ===
24 March 2001

Camberley	15 - 39	Bracknell
	Report

Watchetts Recreation Ground
Attendance: 200

24 March 2001

Fylde	27 - 0	West Hartlepool
	Report

Woodlands Memorial Ground

24 March 2001

Kendal	32 - 17	Esher
	Report

Mint Bridge
Attendance: 500

24 March 2001

Newbury Blues	23 - 11	Nottingham
	Report

Monk's Lane
Attendance: 465
Referee: Richard Parker-Sedgmore

24 March 2001

Preston Grasshoppers	50 - 18	Lydney
	Report

Lightfoot Green
Attendance: 410

24 March 2001

Rugby Lions	25 - 13	Harrogate
	Report

Webb Ellis Road
Attendance: 350

24 March 2001

Wharfedale	17 - 37	Rosslyn Park
	Report

The Avenue
Attendance: 400
Referee: Rob Debney

=== Round 25 ===
31 March 2001

Esher	17 - 39	Rugby Lions
	Report

Molesey Road
Attendance: 300
Referee: Richard Parker-Sedgmore

31 March 2001

Harrogate	13 - 13	Preston Grasshoppers
	Report

Claro Road
Attendance: 450
Referee: Mike Hamlin

31 March 2001

Kendal	13 - 22	Bracknell
	Report

Mint Bridge
Attendance: 850

31 March 2001

Nottingham	22 - 26	Wharfedale
	Report

Ireland Avenue
Attendance: 420
Referee: Wayne Barnes

31 March 2001

Rosslyn Park	59 - 0	Fylde
	Report

The Rock
Attendance: 800

31 March 2001

West Hartlepool	17 - 21	Camberley
	Report

Brinkburn
Attendance: 50
Referee: Mark Wilson

31 March 2001

Lydney	C - C	Newbury Blues

- Game was initially postponed but would eventually be cancelled due to fixture congestion and the result being irrelevant to Lydney's eventual relegation.

=== Round 18 (rescheduled games) ===
6 April 2001

Rugby Lions	72 - 7	Fylde
	Report

Webb Ellis Road
Referee: Eric Woodmason

- Game rescheduled from 20 January 2001.

7 April 2001

Kendal	24 - 5	Camberley
	Report

Mint Bridge
Attendance: 420

- Game rescheduled from 20 January 2001.

7 April 2001

Newbury Blues	3 - 53	Bracknell
	Report

Monk's Lane
Attendance: 495
Referee: R Glynne Jones

- Game rescheduled from 20 January 2001.

7 April 2001

Preston Grasshoppers	20 - 3	Wharfedale
	Report

Lightfoot Green
Attendance: 220

- Game rescheduled from 20 January 2001.

8 April 2001

Esher	86 - 5	West Hartlepool
	Report

Molesey Road
Attendance: 400

- Game rescheduled from 20 January 2001.

=== Round 26 ===
14 April 2001

Bracknell	76 - 0	West Hartlepool
	Report

Lily Hill Park
Attendance: 600

14 April 2001

Camberley	10 - 23	Rosslyn Park
	Report

Watchetts Recreation Ground
Attendance: 250

14 April 2001

Fylde	3 - 23	Nottingham
	Report

Woodlands Memorial Ground

14 April 2001

Newbury Blues	22 - 12	Harrogate
	Report

Monk's Lane
Attendance: 500
Referee: Alan Biggs

14 April 2001

Preston Grasshoppers	22 - 10	Esher
	Report

Lightfoot Green
Attendance: 260
Referee: Paul Dix

14 April 2001

Rugby Lions	62 - 21	Kendal
	Report

Webb Ellis Road
Attendance: 450
Referee: Andrew Pearce

14 April 2001

Wharfedale	C - C	Lydney

- Game was initially postponed but would eventually be cancelled due to fixture congestion and the result being irrelevant to Lydney's eventual relegation.

=== Rounds 19, 20 & 21 (rescheduled games) ===
21 April 2001

Camberley	12 - 69	Rugby Lions
	Report

Watchetts Recreation Ground
Attendance: 150
Referee: David Grashoff

- Game rescheduled from 27 January 2001.

21 April 2001

Kendal	10 - 22	Rosslyn Park
	Report

Mint Bridge
Attendance: 400

- Game rescheduled from 10 February 2001.

21 April 2001

West Hartlepool	17 - 54	Preston Grasshoppers
	Report

Brinkburn
Attendance: 150
Referee: D Edmunds

- Game rescheduled from 24 February 2001.

=== Rounds 8 & 23 (rescheduled games) ===
28 April 2001

Kendal	31 - 15	Fylde
	Report

Mint Bridge
Attendance: 820

- Game rescheduled from 4 November 2000.

28 April 2001

Wharfedale	49 - 16	Camberley
	Report

The Avenue
Attendance: 350

- Game rescheduled from 10 March 2001.

== Total season attendances ==
Club	Home Games	Total	Average	Highest	Lowest	% Capacity
Bracknell	3 (Note: Missing home attendances v Camberley on 2 September 2000, Fylde on 16 September 2000, Wharfedale on 30 September 2000, Newbury on 14 October 2000, Preston on 28 October 2000, Rugby on 18 November 2000, Kendal on 9 December 2000, Rosslyn Park on 23 December 2000, Nottingham on 13 January 2001, Lydney on 27 January 2001.)	1,000	333	600	200	33%
Camberley	13	2,180	168	250	80	
Esher	13	4,000	308	500	150	10%
Fylde	4 (Note: Missing home attendances v Rugby on 14 October 2000, Esher on 28 October 2000, Rosslyn Park on 9 December 2000, Harrogate on 23 December 2000, Kendal on 13 January 2001, Preston on 27 January 2001, Bracknell on 10 March 2001, West Hartlepool on 24 March 2001 and Nottingham on 14 April 2001.)	1,800	450	500	400	6%
Harrogate	13	5,200	400	600	250	9%
Kendal	9 (Note: Missing home attendances v Nottingham on 23 September 2000, Preston on 16 December 2000, Wharfedale on 6 January 2001 and West Hartlepool on 27 January 2001.)	4,940	549	850	400	12%
Lydney	7 (Note: Lydney only played 11 home games due to game cancellations. Missing home attendances include Kendal on 16 September 2000, Fylde on 16 December 2000 & West Hartlepool on 6 January 2001.)	2,760	394	580	200	13%
Newbury Blues	5 (Note: Missing home attendances v Harrogate on 9 September 2000, Rugby on 28 October 2000, Esher on 18 November 2000, Wharfedale on 3 December 2000, Lydney on 9 December 2000, Kendal on 23 December 2000, Preston on 13 January 2001 and Fylde on 10 February 2001.)	2,210	442	500	300	6%
Nottingham	7 (Note: Missing home attendances v Newbury on 2 September 2000, Rugby on 16 September 2000, Esher on 30 September 2000, Fylde on 25 November 2000, Rosslyn Park on 6 January 2001 and Harrogate on 27 January 2001.)	1,963	280	420	145	6%
Preston Grasshoppers	11 (Note: Missing home attendances v Rugby on 23 December 2000 & Camberley on 10 February 2001.)	4,230	385	630	220	8%
Rosslyn Park	5 (Note: Missing home attendances v Wharfedale on 2 September 2000, Preston on 16 September 2000, Kendal on 30 September 2000, Nottingham on 28 October 2000, Bracknell on 11 September 2000, West Hartlepool on 16 December 2000, Lydney on 13 January 2001 and Esher on 27 January 2001.)	3,250	650	1,000	200	33%
Rugby Lions	6 (Note: Missing home attendances v Lydney on 9 September 2000, Rosslyn Park on 23 September 2000, Preston on 11 November 2000, Esher on 9 December 2000, Newbury on 6 January 2001, West Hartlepool on 10 February 2001 and Fylde on 6 April 2001.)	2,000	333	450	200	10%
West Hartlepool	6 (Note: Missing home attendances v Newbury on 16 September 2000, Rugby on 30 September 2000, Esher on 14 October 2000, Lydney on 28 October 2000, Rosslyn Park on 18 November 2000, Bracknell on 25 November 2000 and Nottingham on 23 December 2000.)	985	164	285	50	16%
Wharfedale	4 (Note: Wharfedale only played 12 home games due to a game cancellation. Missing home attendances include Kendal on 16 September 2000, Fylde on 16 December 2000 & West Hartlepool on 6 January 2001.)	2,000	500	700	350	25%

== Individual statistics ==
- Note that points scorers includes tries as well as conversions, penalties and drop goals.

=== Top points scorers ===
Rank	Player	Team	Appearances	Points
1	(England) Mike Scott	Kendal	24	290
2	(England) Jonathon Gregory	Esher	23	281
3	(England) Chris Glynn	Preston Grasshoppers	24	261
4	(England) Russell Southam	Nottingham	17	256
5	(England) Lee Cholewa	Harrogate	26	231
6	(England) Adam Mounsey	Wharfedale	19	189
7	(England) Paul Roblin	Rosslyn Park	15	163
8	(England) Mike Kenworthy	Bracknell	17	160
9	(England) Brad Mooar	Rosslyn Park	8	135
10	(South Africa) Jacques Steyn	Rugby Lions	14	130

=== Top try scorers ===
Rank	Player	Team	Appearances	Tries
1	(England) Ed Smithies	Harrogate	26	17
2	(England) James Justice	Rosslyn Park	24	16
2	(England) Eddie Saunders	Rugby Lions	24	16
2	(England) Jame Morley	Nottingham	25	16
2	(England) James Tapster	Harrogate	26	16
3	(South Africa) Jacques Steyn	Rugby Lions	14	15
4	(England) Chris Ritchie	Rosslyn Park	20	14
4	(England) Graham Sparks	Bracknell	24	14
5	(England) Guy Spencer	Bracknell	15	12
5	(England) Ben Murphy	Nottingham	26	12

== Season records ==
=== Team ===
Largest home win — 92 pts

92 - 0 Kendal at home to West Hartlepool on 27 January 2001

Largest away win — 57 pts

69 - 12 Rugby Lions away to Camberley on 21 April 2001

Most points scored — 92 pts

92 - 0 Kendal at home to West Hartlepool on 27 January 2001

Most tries in a match — 14 (x2)

Kendal at home to West Hartlepool on 27 January 2001
Esher at home to West Hartlepool on 8 April 2001

Most conversions in a match — 12

Rugby Lions away to Camberley on 21 April 2001

Most penalties in a match — 8

Lydney away to Fylde on 18 November 2000

Most drop goals in a match — 2 (x2)

Camberley at home to Nottingham on 17 February 2001
Nottingham away to Fylde on 14 April 2001

=== Player ===
Most points in a match — 42

(England) Mike Scott for Kendal at home to West Hartlepool on 27 January 2001

Most tries in a match — 4

(England) Mike Scott for Kendal at home to West Hartlepool on 27 January 2001

Most conversions in a match — 11 (x2)

(South Africa) Jaques Steyn for Rugby Lions at home to Camberley on 2 December 2000
(England) Mike Scott for Kendal at home to West Hartlepool on 27 January 2001

Most penalties in a match — 7

(England) Rob Smart for Camberley away to Fylde on 9 September 2000

Most drop goals in a match — 2 (x2)

(England) Howard Graham for Camberley at home to Nottingham on 17 February 2001
(England) Tom Rolt for Nottingham away to Fylde on 14 April 2001

=== Attendances ===
Highest — 1,000

Rosslyn Park at home to Rugby Lions on 24 February 2001

Lowest — 50

West Hartlepool at home to Camberley on 31 March 2001

Highest Average Attendance — 650

Rosslyn Park

Lowest Average Attendance — 164

West Hartlepool

== See also ==
- 2000–01 Premiership Rugby
- 2000–01 National Division One
- 2000–01 National Division Three North
- 2000–01 National Division Three South
