= 1999–00 National League 1 =

Rugby union competition in England

1999–2000 National League 1
- Countries: England
- Champions: Otley (2nd title)
- Runners-up: Birmingham & Solihull (also promoted)
- Relegated: Reading, Blackheath
- Matches played: 182

The 1999–2000 National League 1, sponsored by Jewson, was the thirteenth full season of rugby union within the third tier of the English league system. Due to league restructuring for the 2000–01 season, the league would be renamed to National Division Two for the following season, with the old Allied Dunbar Premiership 2 being renamed as National Division One.

Otley would finish the season as league champions, and along with runners up Birmingham & Solihull would be promoted to the new look National Division One (formerly Premiership Two). Relegated sides included Reading and Blackheath who both dropped to National League 3 South.

== Structure ==
The league consisted of fourteen teams, playing each other on a home and away basis to make a total of twenty-six matches for each team. There were two promotion places with the top two teams promoted to the newly named 2000–01 National Division One (previously known as the Allied Dunbar Premiership Two). Two teams were relegated to either National League 3 South or National League 3 South, depending on geographical location.

== Participating clubs ==
1999–00 National League 1 teams in England
1999–00 National League 1 teams in London

Team	Ground	Capacity	City/Area	Previous season
Birmingham & Solihull	Sharmans Cross	4,000	Solihull, West Midlands	11th
Blackheath	Rectory Field	3,500 (500 seats)	Greenwich, London	Relegated from Premiership 2 (13th)
Bracknell	Lily Hill Park	1,000	Bracknell, Berkshire	Promoted from National 2 South (1st)
Camberley	Watchetts	2,000	Camberley, Surrey	9th
Fylde	Woodlands	7,500 (500 seats)	Lytham St Annes, Lancashire	Relegated from Premiership 2 (14th)
Harrogate	Claro Road	4,500 (500 seats)	Harrogate, North Yorkshire	12th
Lydney	Regentsholm	3,000 (340 seats)	Lydney, Gloucestershire	8th
Newbury	Monks Lane	8,000	Newbury, Berkshire	6th
Nottingham	Ireland Avenue	4,990 (590 seats)	Nottingham, Nottinghamshire	4th
Otley	Cross Green	7,000 (852 seats)	Otley, West Yorkshire	5th
Preston Grasshoppers	Lightfoot Green	2,250 (250 seats)	Preston, Lancashire	Promoted from National 2 North (1st)
Reading	Holme Park		Sonning, Berkshire	10th
Rosslyn Park	The Rock	4,630 (630 seats)	Roehampton, London	3rd
Wharfedale	The Avenue	2,000	Threshfield, North Yorkshire	7th

== League table ==
1999–2000 Jewson National Division One table
Pos	Team	Pld	W	D	L	PF	PA	PD	Pts	Qualification
1	Otley (C)	26	22	1	3	817	399	+418	45	Promoted
2	Birmingham & Solihull	26	21	1	4	659	346	+313	43	Promoted
3	Wharfedale	26	19	1	6	646	317	+329	39	
4	Rosslyn Park	26	17	2	7	694	371	+323	36	
5	Newbury	26	15	1	10	550	483	+67	31	
6	Harrogate	26	14	1	11	508	449	+59	29	
7	Bracknell	26	14	0	12	608	408	+200	28	
8	Preston Grasshoppers	26	12	0	14	608	580	+28	24	
9	Fylde	26	10	1	15	387	485	−98	21	
10	Lydney	26	9	2	15	496	632	−136	20	
11	Nottingham	26	8	1	17	460	574	−114	17	
12	Camberley	26	7	0	19	398	882	−484	14	
13	Reading	26	6	0	20	442	626	−184	12	Relegated
14	Blackheath	26	2	1	23	316	1037	−721	5	Relegated

Rules for classification: Points are awarded as follows: 2 pts for a win, 1 pt for a draw, 0 pts for a loss. If teams are level at any stage, the following tiebreaker is applied: Difference between points for and against.
(C) Champions

== See also ==
- 1999–2000 Premiership 1
- 1999–2000 Premiership 2
- 1999–00 National League 2 North
- 1999–00 National League 2 South
