= Nick Baxter (rugby union) =

English rugby union player

Nick Baxter is an English rugby union player who has represented England Students, England Sevens and the Barbarians. He is the leading try scorer in national league rugby, scoring his 150th try for Pertemps Bees versus Doncaster in April 2006. He was a member of the England Sevens team in the 1998 Kuala Lumpur Commonwealth Games. Nick has currently played for three different National league sides; Worcester Warriors, Pertemps Bees and Stourbridge playing most of his career in the RFU Championship. At the end of the 05/06 season Nick Baxter left Pertemps Bees to join National Division 2 club Stourbridge.

== Club Rugby ==
Baxter started playing his club rugby for Kings Norton before moving to Worcester Warriors. Whilst also playing for the mighty University of Derby. He then signed for Pertemps Bees before moving to National Division 2 side Stourbridge at the end of the 05/06 season. He then returned to Kings Norton on a casual basis while concentrating on his career. He was the first player to score 100 national league tries and currently the only player to score 150 national league tries. In 2005 he received the Rugby Writers' Union Services to Rugby Award. (Previous recipients include Sir Clive Woodward and Keith Wood.)

== International Rugby ==
Baxter briefly played at Sevens level, competing in the 1998 Kuala Lumpur Commonwealth Games He has also played on several occasions for the Barbarians.

== The future ==
After retiring from rugby, Baxter established a career in business with a focus on recruitment, leadership, and organisational development. He has also become involved in the field of artificial intelligence, developing initiatives that explore the use of automation and technology in business performance. Alongside his professional work, he continues to support charitable and community projects linked to sport, education, and inclusion.
