= Norman Curry =

Namibian cricketer (1946–2022)

Personal information
- Full name: Norman Oswald Curry
- Born: 5 September 1946; East London, Cape Province, Union of South Africa
- Died: 8 October 2022 (aged 76)
- Batting: Right-handed
- Bowling: Right-arm medium

International information
- National side: Namibia (1994)

Domestic team information
- Years: Team
- 1973/74: Border

Career statistics
Competition	First-class	List A
Matches	2	1
Runs scored	112	3
Batting average	28.00	3.00
100s/50s	0/1	0/0
Top score	52	3
Catches/stumpings	1/–	0/–
- Source: CricketArchive, 14 October 2022

Norman Oswald Curry (5 September 1946 – 8 October 2022) was a Namibian cricketer.

Born at East London in South Africa, Curry played three matches at first-class and List A level for Border during the 1973–74 South African domestic cricket season. A middle-order batsman, his debut for the team came in the first round of the limited-overs Gillette Cup, with Curry being dismissed for three runs. Later in the season, he was selected for two matches in the first-class Currie Cup, against Griqualand West and Natal "B". Curry's first and only half-century at first-class level came in the fourth innings of the match against Griqualand West, an innings of 52 runs that included a 103-run partnership for the seventh wicket with Samuel Schmidt.

In the 1990s, Curry appeared in several matches for the Namibian national cricket team, which had obtained membership of the International Cricket Council in 1992 following the country's independence two years earlier. His matches for the national side came when he was aged 47, during the 1994 ICC Trophy held in Kenya. Playing five matches during the tournament, Curry scored only 19 runs from three innings, with Namibia winning four out of their seven matches.

Curry later coached several Namibian representative sides in junior-level tournaments. Three of his brothers-in-law, Phillip Hodson, Tony Greig, and Ian Greig, and his nephew Will Hodson all played first-class cricket in England, with the Greigs both playing Test cricket.
