= Thomas Doughty =

Thomas Doughty may refer to:

- Thomas Doughty (explorer) (1545–1578), English explorer
- Thomas Doughty (artist) (1793–1856), American artist
- Thomas Doughty (priest) (1636–1701), Canon of Windsor
