= Bryan Barley =

English rugby union player (born 1960)

- Born: Bryan Barley; 4 January 1960 (age 66) Wakefield, West Yorkshire
- Height: 5 ft 10 in (1.78 m)
- School: Normanton Grammar School
- University: Leeds University
- Occupation: Insurance

Rugby union career
- Position: Centre
Amateur team(s)
Years	Team	Apps	(Points)
- Wakefield
–	Sandal RFC		
International career
Years	Team	Apps	(Points)
1984–1988	England	7	(4)

Bryan Barley was a former England international rugby union centre.

He was educated at Normanton Grammar School and Leeds University where he studied economics and mathematics.

He joined Wakefield RFCin 1978 converting thirteen of Wakefield's seventeen tries (a club record) on his debut. He continued to play for the club until 1993, playing in over 300 games and he was the first Wakefield player to be selected for England direct from the club since Jack Ellis in 1939. On leaving Wakefield he joined Sandal RFC.

David Ingall in the club history book describes how

"he brought both power and subtlety to the outside centre position, with an eye for the smallest gap in the defence or the pace and strength to carry him round his opponent. His tackling was devastating, and he kicked accurately and purposefully from hand"

He played for Yorkshire and England at both 16 and 19 groups and toured Australia in his second year with the England Under 19 group in 1979.

He first played for Yorkshire in 1979, touring with them to France in 1980. He played for England under 23's in 1980 and 1982 and England Students in 1983.

he won the first of his seven England caps against Ireland in the 1984 Five Nations championships. He toured South Africa (1984), New Zealand (1985) and Australia and Fiji (1988) with England.

He also played twice for the Barbarians and represented the North of England against Australia (1983), USSR (1989) and South Africa (1992).
