= 2003–04 National Division One =

Rugby union competition in England

- Countries: England
- Champions: Worcester
- Runners-up: Orrell
- Relegated: Wakefield and Manchester
- Attendance: 198,428 (average 1,470 per match) (Note: Note that 47 home attendances are missing (see below) - so the total attendance will not be 100% accurate. The average attendance has also been taken into account with the missing games not included.)
- Highest attendance: 6,025 Worcester at home to Pertemps Bees on 24 April 2004
- Lowest attendance: 187 Manchester at home to Pertemps Bees on 3 April 2004
- Top point scorer: (England) Tony Yapp (Exeter Chiefs) 320 points
- Top try scorer: (England) Lee Robinson (Plymouth Albion) (England) Leigh Hinton (Orrell) 23 tries

The 2003–04 National Division One was the seventeenth full season of rugby union within the second tier of the English league system, currently known as the RFU Championship. New teams to the division included Bristol Shoguns who had been relegated from the Zurich Premiership 2002–03 while Penzance & Newlyn and Henley Hawks were promoted from the 2002–03 National Division Two. In terms of ground changes Plymouth Albion had a new home - moving from Beacon Park to newly built Brickfields which at 6,500 had twice the capacity of the original ground.

After three consecutive seasons finishing second, Worcester became champions and were promoted to the Zurich Premiership for season 2004–05. Orrell were runners–up, and Wakefield and Manchester were relegated to the 2004–05 National Division Two. Wakefield's final match was on 26 April 2004 against Coventry, who won the match 15–11 and with that defeat, consigned Wakefield, after fourteen consecutive seasons in National Division One, to relegation; while Coventry finished above Wakefield only on points difference. Wakefield folded during the summer for financial reasons.

== Participating teams ==
Locations of the 2003–04 National Division One teams

Team	Stadium	Capacity	City/Area
Bedford Blues	Goldington Road	5,000	Bedford, Bedfordshire
Bristol Shoguns	Memorial Stadium	8,500 (1,200 seats)	Bristol
Coventry	Coundon Road	10,000 (1,100 seats)	Coventry, West Midlands
Exeter Chiefs	County Ground	5,750 (750 seats)	Exeter, Devon
Henley Hawks	Dry Leas	4,000	Henley-on-Thames, Oxfordshire
London Welsh	Old Deer Park	4,500 (1,500 seats)	Richmond, London
Manchester	Grove Park	4,000	Cheadle Hulme, Greater Manchester
Orrell	Edge Hall Road	5,300 (300 seats)	Orrell, Greater Manchester
Otley	Cross Green	7,000 (852 seats)	Otley, West Yorkshire
Penzance & Newlyn	Mennaye Field	3,500	Penzance, Cornwall
Pertemps Bees	Sharmans Cross	4,000	Solihull, West Midlands
Plymouth Albion	The Brickfields	6,500	Plymouth, Devon
Wakefield	College Grove	4,000 (500 seats)	Wakefield, West Yorkshire
Worcester	Sixways	8,477	Worcester, Worcestershire

== Final table ==
2003–04 National Division One Final table
Pos	Team	Pld	W	D	L	PF	PA	PD	B	Pts	Qualification
1	Worcester	26	26	0	0	1119	340	+779	21	125	Promoted
2	Orrell	26	22	0	4	946	455	+491	20	108	
3	Plymouth Albion	26	19	1	6	752	417	+335	14	92	
4	Pertemps Bees	26	16	1	9	691	526	+165	17	83	
5	Otley	26	17	0	9	609	484	+125	7	75	
6	Exeter Chiefs	26	15	1	10	706	499	+207	12	74	
7	Bedford Blues	26	12	1	13	623	627	−4	11	61	
8	London Welsh	26	12	0	14	526	605	−79	10	58	
9	Bristol Shoguns	26	10	0	16	547	650	−103	11	51	
10	Penzance and Newlyn	26	8	1	17	474	892	−418	9	43	
11	Henley Hawks	26	6	2	18	488	780	−292	11	39	
12	Coventry	26	6	2	18	488	733	−245	9	37	
13	Wakefield	26	6	1	19	392	709	−317	11	37	Relegated
14	Manchester	24	1	0	23	363	1007	−644	5	9	Relegated

Source: rugbyarchive.net and trelawnys-army.org.uk
Rules for classification: Points are awarded as follows: four points for a win; two points for a draw; no points for a loss; one bonus point for scoring four tries or more in a match; one bonus point for losing by seven points or less.
- If teams are level at any stage, tiebreakers are applied in the following order: (1) difference between points for and against; (2) total number of points for.

== Results ==
=== Round 1 ===
6 September 2003

Bedford Blues	29 - 15	Manchester
	Report

Goldington Road
Attendance: 1,351
Referee: Alan Biggs

6 September 2003

Coventry	19 - 23	Plymouth Albion
	Report

Coundon Road
Attendance: 1,300
Referee: David Grashoff

6 September 2003

Henley Hawks	16 - 27	London Welsh
	Report

Dry Leas
Attendance: 695
Referee: Tim Beddow

6 September 2003

Otley	20 - 26	Worcester
	Report

Cross Green
Attendance: 700
Referee: Tim Wigglesworth

6 September 2003

Orrell	55 - 7	Wakefield
	Report

Edge Hall Road
Attendance: 700
Referee: Robin Goodliffe

6 September 2003

Pertemps Bees	27 - 18	Exeter Chiefs
	Report

Sharmans Cross
Attendance: 400
Referee: David Rose

7 September 2003

Bristol Shoguns	34 - 7	Penzance & Newlyn
	Report

Memorial Stadium
Attendance: 4,217
Referee: Rob Debney

=== Round 2 ===
13 September 2003

Exeter Chiefs	42 - 21	Coventry
	Report

County Ground
Attendance: 1,077
Referee: Rob Debney

13 September 2003

Manchester	20 - 36	London Welsh
	Report

Grove Park
Attendance: 450
Referee: Nick Williams

13 September 2003

Penzance & Newlyn	20 - 15	Henley Hawks
	Report

Mennaye Field
Referee: Geraint Ashton-Jones

13 September 2003

Plymouth Albion	10 - 16	Otley
	Report

Brickfields
Attendance: 3,000
Referee: Alan Biggs

13 September 2003

Wakefield	27 - 23	Bedford Blues
	Report

College Grove
Attendance: 300
Referee: Tim Wigglesworth

13 September 2003

Worcester	40 - 14	Orrell
	Report

Sixways
Attendance: 2,500
Referee: David Rose

14 September 2003

Bristol Shoguns	11 - 45	Pertemps Bees
	Report

Memorial Stadium
Attendance: 4,140
Referee: Wayne Barnes

=== Round 3 ===
20 September 2003

Bedford Blues	20 - 31	Worcester
	Report

Goldington Road
Attendance: 2,005
Referee: Robin Goodliffe

20 September 2003

Coventry	40 - 21	Bristol Shoguns
	Report

Coundon Road
Referee: Martin Fox

20 September 2003

Henley Hawks	38 - 9	Manchester
	Report

Dry Leas
Referee: Bruce Robertson

20 September 2003

London Welsh	3 - 17	Wakefield
	Report

Old Deer Park
Attendance: 1,010
Referee: S Leyshon

20 September 2003

Orrell	25 - 15	Plymouth Albion
	Report

Edge Hall Road
Attendance: 654
Referee: Tim Beddow

20 September 2003

Otley	30 - 28	Exeter Chiefs
	Report

Cross Green
Referee: Mark Wilson

20 September 2003

Pertemps Bees	50 - 17	Penzance & Newlyn
	Report

Sharmans Cross
Attendance: 635
Referee: Sean Davey

=== Round 4 ===
27 September 2003

Exeter Chiefs	26 - 40	Orrell
	Report

County Ground
Referee: Wayne Barnes

27 September 2003

Penzance & Newlyn	28 - 16	Coventry
	Report

Mennaye Field
Attendance: 1,850
Referee: Eric Gauzins

27 September 2003

Pertemps Bees	42 - 12	Henley Hawks
	Report

Sharmans Cross
Referee: Chris Sharp

27 September 2003

Plymouth Albion	15 - 24	Bedford Blues
	Report

Brickfields
Attendance: 2,316
Referee: Bruce Robertson

27 September 2003

Wakefield	33 - 8	Manchester
	Report

College Grove
Attendance: 300
Referee: Robin Goodliffe

27 September 2003

Worcester	34 - 0	London Welsh
	Report

Sixways
Attendance: 2,580
Referee: Mark Wilson

28 September 2003

Bristol Shoguns	11 - 35	Otley
	Report

Memorial Stadium
Attendance: 3,779
Referee: Geraint Ashton-Jones

=== Round 5 ===
11 October 2003

Bedford Blues	47 - 24	Exeter Chiefs
	Report

Goldington Road
Referee: Chris Sharp

11 October 2003

Coventry	13 - 39	Pertemps Bees
	Report

Coundon Road
Referee: Rob Debney

11 October 2003

Henley Hawks	24 - 26	Wakefield
	Report Report

Dry Leas
Referee: Tim Beddow

11 October 2003

London Welsh	27 - 35	Plymouth Albion
	Report

Old Deer Park

11 October 2003

Manchester	3 - 56	Worcester
	Report

Grove Park
Attendance: 720
Referee: Tim Wigglesworth

11 October 2003

Orrell	29 - 21	Bristol Shoguns
	Report

Edge Hall Road
Attendance: 397
Referee: Sean Davey

11 October 2003

Otley	33 - 6	Penzance & Newlyn
	Report

Cross Green
Referee: Bruce Robertson

=== Round 6 ===
25 October 2003

Coventry	12 - 29	Henley Hawks

Coundon Road
Referee: Bruce Robertson

25 October 2003

Exeter Chiefs	29 - 13	London Welsh
	Report

County Ground
Referee: Tim Beddow

25 October 2003

Penzance & Newlyn	12 - 48	Orrell
	Report

Mennaye Field
Referee: Trevor Fisher

25 October 2003

Pertemps Bees	32 - 23	Otley
	Report

Sharmans Cross
Referee: Mark Wilson

25 October 2003

Plymouth Albion	54 - 14	Manchester
	Report

Brickfields
Referee: Rob Debney

25 October 2003

Worcester	46 - 15	Wakefield
	Report

Sixways
Attendance: 2,098
Referee: Martin Fox

26 October 2003

Bristol Shoguns	20 - 14	Bedford Blues
	Report

Memorial Stadium
Attendance: 3,235
Referee: David Rose

=== Round 7 ===
8 November 2003

Bedford Blues	39 - 7	Penzance & Newlyn
	Report

Goldington Road
Referee: Alan Biggs

8 November 2003

London Welsh	23 - 10	Bristol Shoguns
	Report

Old Deer Park
Attendance: 1,050
Referee: Bruce Robertson

8 November 2003

Manchester	14 - 19	Exeter Chiefs
	Report

Grove Park
Referee: Trevor Fisher

8 November 2003

Orrell	20 - 13	Pertemps Bees
	Report

Edge Hall Road
Attendance: 407
Referee: Rob Debney

8 November 2003

Otley	27 - 11	Coventry
	Report

Cross Green
Referee: Tim Beddow

8 November 2003

Wakefield	10 - 14	Plymouth Albion
	Report

College Grove
Referee: Tim Wigglesworth

8 November 2003

Worcester	59 - 24	Henley Hawks
	Report

Sixways
Attendance: 2,027
Referee: David Grashoff

=== Round 8 ===
15 November 2003

Exeter Chiefs	P - P	Wakefield

- Postponed. Game rescheduled to 20 December 2003.

15 November 2003

Henley Hawks	16 - 23	Otley
	Report

Dry Leas
Attendance: 450
Referee: Andrew Small

15 November 2003

London Welsh	P - P	Penzance & Newlyn

- Postponed. Game rescheduled to 21 February 2004.

15 November 2003

Orrell	32 - 8	Coventry
	Report

Edge Hall Road
Attendance: 309
Referee: Chris Sharp

15 November 2003

Plymouth Albion	17 - 43	Worcester
	Report

Brickfields
Attendance: 1,932
Referee: Alan Biggs

15 November 2003

Pertemps Bees	P - P	Bedford Blues

- Postponed. Game rescheduled to 20 December 2003.

16 November 2003

Bristol Shoguns	P - P	Manchester

- Postponed. Game rescheduled to 20 December 2003.

=== Round 9 ===
22 November 2003

Coventry	23 - 19	Bedford Blues
	Report

Coundon Road
Referee: Nigel Higginson

22 November 2003

Henley Hawks	14 - 35	Plymouth Albion
	Report

Dry Leas
Referee: Nick Williams

22 November 2003

London Welsh	16 - 0	Pertemps Bees
	Report

Old Deer Park
Referee: Sean Davey

22 November 2003

Manchester	34 - 14	Penzance & Newlyn
	Report

Grove Park
Attendance: 450
Referee: Chris Sharp

22 November 2003

Otley	16 - 29	Orrell
	Report

Cross Green
Referee: Bruce Robertson

22 November 2003

Worcester	37 - 14	Exeter Chiefs
	Report

Sixways
Attendance: 2,538
Referee: Wayne Barnes

23 November 2003

Wakefield	23 - 34	Bristol Shoguns
	Report

College Grove
Attendance: 300
Referee: Mark Wilson

=== Round 10 ===
29 November 2003

Bedford Blues	22 - 15	Otley
	Report

Goldington Road
Attendance: 1,312
Referee: Mark Wilson

29 November 2003

Coventry	25 - 17	London Welsh
	Report

Coundon Road
Attendance: 1,000
Referee: Rob Debney

29 November 2003

Exeter Chiefs	17 - 19	Plymouth Albion
	Report

County Ground
Attendance: 2,500
Referee: Bruce Robertson

29 November 2003

Orrell	69 - 15	Henley Hawks
	Report

Edge Hall Road
Attendance: 391
Referee: David Rose

29 November 2003

Penzance & Newlyn	22 - 7	Wakefield
	Report

Mennaye Field
Attendance: 1,500
Referee: Andrew Small

29 November 2003

Pertemps Bees	39 - 12	Manchester
	Report

Sharmans Cross
Attendance: 300
Referee: Geraint Ashton-Jones

30 November 2003

Bristol Shoguns	3 - 10	Worcester
	Report

Memorial Stadium
Attendance: 4,170
Referee: Tim Beddow

=== Round 11 ===
6 December 2003

Henley Hawks	10 - 34	Exeter Chiefs
	Report

Dry Leas
Referee: Tony Spreadbury

6 December 2003

London Welsh	13 - 19	Otley
	Report

Old Deer Park
Attendance: 700
Referee: Andrew Small

6 December 2003

Manchester	16 - 16	Coventry
	Report

Grove Park
Attendance: 550
Referee: Eric Gauzin

6 December 2003

Orrell	57 - 24	Bedford Blues
	Report

Edge Hall Road
Attendance: 409
Referee: Tim Wigglesworth

6 December 2003

Plymouth Albion	34 - 16	Bristol Shoguns
	Report

Brickfields
Referee: David Grashoff

6 December 2003

Wakefield	19 - 44	Pertemps Bees
	Report

College Grove
Referee: Trevor Fisher

6 December 2003

Worcester	71 - 10	Penzance & Newyln
	Report

Sixways
Attendance: 2,386
Referee: Nigel Higginson

=== Round 12 ===
13 December 2003

Bedford Blues	45 - 20	Henley Hawks
	Report

Goldington Road
Attendance: 1,458
Referee: Chris Sharp

13 December 2003

Coventry	23 - 16	Wakefield
	Report

Coundon Road
Attendance: 1,000
Referee: Nick Williams

13 December 2003

London Welsh	28 - 40	Orrell
	Report

Old Deer Park
Attendance: 820
Referee: Tim Beddow

13 December 2003

Otley	51 - 20	Manchester

Cross Green
Attendance: 575
Referee: Martin Fox

13 December 2003

Pertemps Bees	0 - 18	Worcester
	Report

Sharmans Cross
Attendance: 2,000
Referee: Chris White

14 December 2003

Bristol Shoguns	43 - 15	Exeter Chiefs
	Report

Memorial Stadium
Attendance: 3,590
Referee: Steve Lander

14 December 2003

Penzance & Newlyn	3 - 48	Plymouth Albion
	Report

Mennaye Field
Attendance: 5,100
Referee: Tony Spreadbury

=== Round 8 (Rescheduled games) ===
20 December 2003

Exeter Chiefs	24 - 5	Wakefield
	Report

County Ground
Referee: Nigel Higginson

20 December 2003

Pertemps Bees	22 - 5	Bedford Blues
	Report

Sharmans Cross
Referee: Tim Beddow

20 December 2003

Bristol Shoguns	34 - 20	Manchester
	Report

Memorial Stadium
Attendance: 3,427
Referee: Chris Sharp

=== Round 13 ===
27 December 2003

Bedford Blues	19 - 22	London Welsh
	Report

Goldington Road
Attendance: 3,427
Referee: Geraint Ashton-Jones

27 December 2003

Exeter Chiefs	P - P	Penzance & Newlyn

- Postponed. Game rescheduled to 3 January 2004.

27 December 2003

Henley Hawks	P - P	Bristol Shoguns

- Postponed. Game rescheduled to 3 January 2004.

27 December 2003

Manchester	9 - 38	Orrell
	Report

Grove Park
Attendance: 760
Referee: Mark Wilson

27 December 2003

Plymouth Albion	16 - 22	Pertemps Bees
	Report

Brickfields
Attendance: 3,882
Referee: Rob Debney

27 December 2003

Wakefield	10 - 23	Otley
	Report

College Grove
Attendance: 600
Referee: Tim Beddow

27 December 2003

Worcester	31 - 7	Coventry
	Report

Sixways
Attendance: 5,068
Referee: Sean Davey

=== Round 13 (Rescheduled games) ===
3 January 2004

Exeter Chiefs	26 - 12	Penzance & Newlyn
	Report

County Ground
Referee: Tim Wigglesworth

3 January 2004

Henley Hawks	18 - 13	Bristol Shoguns
	Report

Dry Leas
Attendance: 1,700
Referee: Nigel Higginson

=== Round 14 ===
10 January 2004

Exeter Chiefs	6 - 12	Pertemps Bees
	Report

County Ground
Referee: Mark Wilson

10 January 2004

London Welsh	18 - 13	Henley Hawks
	Report

Old Deer Park
Referee: Bruce Robertson

10 January 2004

Manchester	19 - 47	Bedford Blues
	Report

Grove Park
Attendance: 410
Referee: Tim Beddow

10 January 2004

Penzance & Newlyn	18 - 20	Bristol Shoguns
	Report

Mennaye Field
Attendance: 2,020
Referee: David Rose

10 January 2004

Plymouth Albion	51 - 9	Coventry
	Report

Brickfields
Attendance: 2,203
Referee: Geraint Ashton-Jones

10 January 2004

Wakefield	24 - 53	Orrell
	Report

College Grove
Attendance: 300
Referee: Trevor Fisher

10 January 2004

Worcester	38 - 3	Otley
	Report

Sixways
Attendance: 3,370
Referee: Nigel Higginson

=== Round 15 ===
17 January 2004

Bedford Blues	29 - 8	Wakefield
	Report

Goldington Road
Attendance: 1,884
Referee: Llyr Apgeraint-Roberts

17 January 2004

Coventry	26 - 31	Exeter Chiefs
	Report

Coundon Road
Attendance: 1,850
Referee: Gareth Copsey

17 January 2004

Henley Hawks	18 - 24	Penzance & Newlyn
	Report

Dry Leas
Attendance: 1,125
Referee: David Grashoff

17 January 2004

London Welsh	21 - 17	Manchester
	Report

Old Deer Park
Referee: Nick Williams

17 January 2004

Orrell	7 - 15	Worcester
	Report

Edge Hall Road
Attendance: 3,207
Referee: Ashley Rowden

17 January 2004

Otley	24 - 29	Plymouth Albion
	Report

Cross Green
Referee: Alan Biggs

17 January 2004

Pertemps Bees	37 - 22	Bristol Shoguns
	Report

Sharmans Cross
Attendance: 800
Referee: Trevor Fisher

=== Round 16 ===
24 January 2004

Exeter Chiefs	22 - 8	Otley
	Report

County Ground
Referee: Llyr Apgeraint-Roberts

24 January 2004

Manchester	23 - 28	Henley Hawks
	Report

Grove Park
Attendance: 300
Referee: Martin Fox

24 January 2004

Penzance & Newlyn	32 - 53	Pertemps Bees
	Report

Mennaye Field
Referee: Nigel Higginson

24 January 2004

Plymouth Albion	22 - 19	Orrell
	Report

Brickfields
Referee: Wayne Barnes

24 January 2004

Wakefield	8 - 11	London Welsh
	Report

College Grove
Referee: Rob Debney

24 January 2004

Worcester	43 - 5	Bedford Blues
	Report

Sixways
Attendance: 3,420
Referee: Bruce Robertson

25 January 2004

Bristol Shoguns	26 - 25	Coventry
	Report

Memorial Stadium
Attendance: 4,060
Referee: Tim Beddow

=== Round 17 ===
31 January 2004

Bedford Blues	6 - 26	Plymouth Albion
	Report

Goldington Road
Referee: Gareth Copsey

31 January 2004

Coventry	17 - 27	Penzance & Newlyn
	Report

Coundon Road
Attendance: 1,350
Referee: Andrew Small

31 January 2004

Henley Hawks	17 - 19	Pertemps Bees
	Report

Dry Leas
Referee: Bruce Robertson

31 January 2004

London Welsh	3 - 28	Worcester
	Report

Old Deer Park
Attendance: 1,650
Referee: Mark Wilson

31 January 2004

Manchester	11 - 12	Wakefield
	Report

Grove Park
Attendance: 230
Referee: Sean Davey

31 January 2004

Orrell	16 - 13	Exeter Chiefs
	Report

Edge Hall Road
Attendance: 409
Referee: Martin Fox

31 January 2004

Otley	19 - 5	Bristol Shoguns
	Report

Cross Green
Referee: Tim Fisher

=== Round 18 ===
7 February 2004

Exeter Chiefs	21 - 10	Bedford Blues
	Report

County Ground
Referee: Nigel Higginson

7 February 2004

Penzance & Newlyn	30 - 21	Otley
	Report

Mennaye Field
Referee: Nick Williams

7 February 2004

Pertemps Bees	29 - 24	Coventry
	Report

Sharmans Cross
Referee: Robin Goodliffe

7 February 2004

Plymouth Albion	48 - 15	London Welsh
	Report

Brickfields
Attendance: 2,612
Referee: Jean Matheu

7 February 2004

Wakefield	13 - 13	Henley Hawks
	Report

College Grove
Referee: Tim Wigglesworth

7 February 2004

Worcester	74 - 8	Manchester
	Report

Sixways
Attendance: 3,739
Referee: Trevor Fisher

8 February 2004

Bristol Shoguns	26 - 27	Orrell
	Report

Memorial Stadium
Attendance: 3,569
Referee: Andrew Small

=== Round 19 ===
14 February 2004

Bedford Blues	30 - 16	Bristol Shoguns
	Report

Goldington Road
Attendance: 1,436
Referee: Eric Gauzins

14 February 2004

Henley Hawks	26 - 26	Coventry
	Report

Dry Leas
Attendance: 785
Referee: Geraint Ashton-Jones

14 February 2004

Manchester	7 - 55	Plymouth Albion
	Report

Grove Park
Attendance: 275
Referee: Chris Sharp

14 February 2004

Orrell	53 - 7	Penzance & Newlyn
	Report

Edge Hall Road
Attendance: 357
Referee: Tim Wigglesworth

14 February 2004

Otley	26 - 12	Pertemps Bees
	Report

Cross Green
Attendance: 610
Referee: Sean Davey

14 February 2004

Wakefield	19 - 64	Worcester
	Report

College Grove
Attendance: 350
Referee: Alan Biggs

15 February 2004

London Welsh	27 - 43	Exeter Chiefs
	Report

Old Deer Park
Attendance: 650
Referee: Nick Williams

=== Round 8 & 25 (Rescheduled games) ===
21 February 2004

Penzance & Newlyn	40 - 38	London Welsh
	Report

Mennaye Field
Attendance: 1,720
Referee: Alan Biggs

21 February 2004

Pertemps Bees	17 - 11	Wakefield
	Report

Sharmans Cross
Attendance: 400
Referee: Mark Wilson

- Game brought forward from 17 April 2004.

=== Round 20 ===
28 February 2004

Coventry	15 - 28	Otley
	Report

Coundon Road
Attendance: 1,500
Referee: Rob Debney

28 February 2004

Exeter Chiefs	85 - 6	Manchester
	Report

County Ground
Attendance: 1,069
Referee: Geraint Ashton-Jones

28 February 2004

Henley Hawks	33 - 69	Worcester
	Report

Dry Leas
Attendance: 945
Referee: Nigel Higginson

28 February 2004

Penzance & Newlyn	20 - 20	Bedford Blues
	Report

Mennaye Field
Attendance: 1,820
Referee: Tim Beddow

28 February 2004

Pertemps Bees	P - P	Orrell

- Postponed. Game rescheduled for 7 March 2004.

28 February 2004

Plymouth Albion	11 - 7	Wakefield
	Report

Brickfields
Attendance: 2,564
Referee: Gareth Copsey

29 February 2004

Bristol Shoguns	18 - 30	London Welsh
	Report

Memorial Stadium
Attendance: 3,703
Referee: Bruce Robertson

=== Round 20 & 25 (Rescheduled games) ===
6 March 2004

Penzance & Newlyn	24 - 49	Worcester
	Report

Mennaye Field
Attendance: 1,800
Referee: Nick Williams

- Game brought forward from 17 April 2004.

7 March 2004

Pertemps Bees	24 - 29	Orrell
	Report

Sharmans Cross
Referee: Andrew Small

=== Round 21 ===
13 March 2004

Bedford Blues	P - P	Pertemps Bees

- Postponed. Game rescheduled for 27 March 2004.

13 March 2004

Coventry	17 - 22	Orrell
	Report

Coundon Road
Attendance: 1,700
Referee: David Rose

13 March 2004

London Welsh	37 - 5	Penzance & Newlyn
	Report

Old Deer Park
Attendance: 1,640
Referee: Bruce Kuklinski

13 March 2004

Manchester	6 - 27	Bristol Shoguns
	Report

Grove Park
Attendance: 345
Referee: Tim Beddow

13 March 2004

Otley	28 - 21	Henley Hawks
	Report

Cross Green
Attendance: 600
Referee: Tim Wigglesworth

13 March 2004

Wakefield	0 - 54	Exeter Chiefs
	Report

College Grove
Attendance: 250
Referee: Trevor Fisher

13 March 2004

Worcester	38 - 13	Plymouth Albion
	Report

Sixways
Attendance: 4,351
Referee: Robin Goodliffe

=== Round 22 ===
19 March 2004

Bedford Blues	24 - 20	Coventry
	Report

Goldington Road
Attendance: 1,774
Referee: Andrew Small

20 March 2004

Exeter Chiefs	14 - 25	Worcester
	Report

County Ground
Attendance: 2,100
Referee: Martin Fox

20 March 2004

Orrell	28 - 14	Otley
	Report

Edge Hall Road
Attendance: 286
Referee: Sean Davey

20 March 2004

Penzance & Newlyn	48 - 9	Manchester
	Report

Mennaye Field
Attendance: 1,000
Referee: Geraint Ashton-Jones

20 March 2004

Pertemps Bees	18-31	London Welsh
	Report

Sharmans Cross
Attendance: 350
Referee: Llyr Apgeraint-Roberts

20 March 2004

Plymouth Albion	55 - 0	Henley Hawks
	Report

Brickfields
Attendance: 1,648
Referee: Chris Sharp

21 March 2004

Bristol Shoguns	19 - 15	Wakefield
	Report

Memorial Stadium
Attendance: 2,831
Referee: Bruce Kuklinski

=== Round 21 (Rescheduled game) ===
27 March 2004

Bedford Blues	38 - 26	Pertemps Bees
	Report

Goldington Road
Attendance: 1,017
Referee: Nick Williams

=== Round 23 ===
3 April 2004

Henley Hawks	20 - 17	Orrell
	Report

Dry Leas
Attendance: 520
Referee: Trevor Fisher

3 April 2004

London Welsh	41 - 8	Coventry
	Report

Old Deer Park
Attendance: 1,500
Referee: Alan Biggs

3 April 2004

Manchester	18 - 18	Pertemps Bees
	Report

Grove Park
Attendance: 187
Referee: Bruce Robertson

3 April 2004

Otley	27 - 17	Bedford Blues
	Report

Cross Green
Attendance: 590
Referee: Gareth Copsey

3 April 2004

Plymouth Albion	7 - 7	Exeter Chiefs
	Report

Brickfields
Attendance: 3,968
Referee: Tim Beddow

3 April 2004

Wakefield	38 - 31	Penzance & Newlyn
	Report

College Grove
Attendance: 300
Referee: S Leyshon

3 April 2004

Worcester	68 - 15	Bristol Shoguns
	Report

Sixways
Attendance: 5,228
Referee: Geraint Ashton-Jones

=== Round 24 ===
10 April 2004

Coventry	18 - 57	Worcester
	Report

Coundon Road
Attendance: 2,647

10 April 2004

London Welsh	25 - 30	Bedford Blues
	Report

Old Deer Park
Attendance: 1,750
Referee: Llyr Apgeraint-Roberts

10 April 2004

Orrell	75 - 22	Manchester
	Report

Edge Hall Road
Referee: Chris Sharp

10 April 2004

Otley	38 - 11	Wakefield
	Report

Cross Green
Attendance: 720
Referee: Robin Goodliffe

10 April 2004

Penzance & Newlyn	10 - 42	Exeter Chiefs
	Report

Mennaye Field
Attendance: 3,000
Referee: Alan Biggs

10 April 2004

Pertemps Bees	20 - 23	Plymouth Albion
	Report

Sharmans Cross
Attendance: 500
Referee: Mark Wilson

11 April 2004

Bristol Shoguns	38 - 10	Henley Hawks
	Report

Memorial Stadium
Attendance: 3,477
Referee: Wayne Barnes

=== Round 25 ===
17 April 2004

Bedford Blues	22 - 55	Orrell
	Report

Goldington Road
Attendance: 1,818
Referee: Jean Luc Rebollal

17 April 2004

Coventry	34 - 20	Manchester
	Report

Coundon Road
Attendance: 3,100
Referee: Stave Lander

- Coventry's last ever home game at Coundon Road.

17 April 2004

Exeter Chiefs	21 - 15	Henley Hawks
	Report

County Ground
Attendance: 1,127
Referee: Nick Williams

17 April 2004

Otley	16 - 9	London Welsh
	Report

Cross Green
Attendance: 790
Referee: Andrew Small

17 April 2004

Penzance & Newlyn	P - P	Worcester

- Game brought forward to 6 March 2004.

17 April 2004

Pertemps Bees	P - P	Wakefield

- Game brought forward to 21 February 2004.

17 April 2004

Bristol Shoguns	P - P	Plymouth Albion

- Postponed. Game rescheduled for 21 April 2004.

=== Round 25 (Rescheduled game) ===
21 April 2004

Bristol Shoguns	15 - 21	Plymouth Albion
	Report

Memorial Stadium
Attendance: 3,697
Referee: Alan Biggs

=== Round 26 ===
24 April 2004

Exeter Chiefs	31 - 19	Bristol Shoguns
	Report

County Ground
Attendance: 2,211
Referee: Llyr Apgeraint-Roberts

24 April 2004

Henley Hawks	23 - 15	Bedford Blues
	Report

Dry Leas
Attendance: 2,020
Referee: Wayne Barnes

24 April 2004

Manchester	3 - 26	Otley
	Report

Grove Park
Attendance: 248
Referee: Gareth Copsey

24 April 2004

Orrell	49 - 0	London Welsh
	Report

Edge Hall Road
Attendance: 427

24 April 2004

Plymouth Albion	56 - 0	Penzance & Newlyn
	Report

Brickfields
Attendance: 4,342
Referee: Mark Wilson

24 April 2004

Wakefield	11 - 15	Coventry
	Report

College Grove
Attendance: 600
Referee: David Rose

24 April 2004

Worcester	49 - 31	Pertemps Bees
	Report

Sixways
Attendance: 6,025
Referee: Steve Lander

== Total Season Attendances ==
Club	Home Games	Total	Average	Highest	Lowest	% Capacity
Bedford Blues	10 (Note: Missing home attendances v Exeter on 11 October 2003, Penzance & Newlyn on 8 November 2003 & Plymouth on 31 January 2003.)	17,482	1,748	3,427	1,017	35%
Bristol Shoguns	13	47,895	3,684	4,217	2,831	30%
Coventry	9 (Note: Missing home attendances v Bristol on 20 September 2003, Pertemps Bees on 11 October 2003, Henley on 25 October 2003 & Bedford on 22 November 2003.)	15,447	1,716	3,100	1,000	17%
Exeter Chiefs	6 (Note: Missing home attendances v Orrell on 27 September 2003, London Welsh on 25 October 2003, Wakefield on 20 December 2003, Penzance & Newlyn on 3 January 2004, Pertemps Bees on 10 January 2004, Otley on 24 January 2004 & Bedford on 7 February 2004.)	10,084	1,681	2,500	1,069	29%
Henley Hawks	8 (Note: Missing home attendances v Manchester on 20 September 2003, Wakefield on 11 October 2003, Plymouth on 22 November 2003, Exeter on 6 December 2003 & Pertemps Bees on 31 January 2003.)	8,240	1,030	2,020	450	26%
London Welsh	9 (Note: Missing home attendances v Plymouth on 11 October 2003, Pertemps Bees on 22 November 2003, Henley on 10 January 2004 & Manchester on 17 January 2004.)	10,770	1,197	1,750	650	27%
Manchester	12 (Note: Missing home attendance v Exeter on 8 November 2003.)	4,925	410	760	187	10%
Orrell	12 (Note: Missing home attendance v Manchester on 10 April 2004.)	7,953	663	3,207	286	12%
Otley	7 (Note: Missing home attendances v Exeter on 20 September 2003, Penzance & Newlyn on 11 October 2003, Coventry on 8 November 2003, Orrell on 22 November 2003, Plymouth on 17 January 2004 & Bristol on 31 January 2004.)	4,585	655	790	575	9%
Penzance & Newlyn	9 (Note: Missing home attendances v Henley on 13 September 2003, Orrell on 25 October 2003, Pertemps Bees on 24 January 2004, Otley on 7 February 2004.)	19,810	2,201	5,100	1,000	58%
Pertemps Bees	8 (Note: Missing home attendances v Henley on 27 September 2003, Otley on 25 October 2003, Bedford on 20 December 2003, Coventry on 7 February 2004 & Orrell on 7 March 2004.)	5,385	673	2,000	300	17%
Plymouth Albion	10 (Note: Missing home attendances v Manchester on 25 October 2003, Bristol on 6 December 2003 & Orrell on 24 January 2004.)	28,467	2,847	4,342	1,648	44%
Wakefield	9 (Note: Missing home attendances v Plymouth on 8 November 2003, Pertemps Bees on 6 December 2003, London Welsh on 24 January 2004 & Henley on 7 February 2004.)	3,300	367	600	250	9%
Worcester	13	45,330	3,487	6,025	2,027	41%

== Individual statistics ==
- Note that points scorers include tries as well as conversions, penalties, and drop goals.

=== Top points scorers ===
Rank	Player	Team	Appearances	Points
1	(England) Tony Yapp	Exeter Chiefs	26	320
2	(England) Leigh Hinton	Orrell	26	313
3	(England) Simon Binns	Otley	26	310
4	(Cook Islands) Tommy Hayes	Worcester	25	303
5	(England) Barry Reeves	Henley Hawks	26	249
6	(England) Tom Barlow	Plymouth Albion	22	185
7	(Wales) Gareth Cull	Coventry	19	184
8	(England) Danny Gray	Bristol Shoguns	17	157
9	(England) Seb Fitzgerald	London Welsh	21	150
10	(England) Ed Barnes	Bedford Blues	19	144

=== Top try scorers ===
Rank	Player	Team	Appearances	Tries
1	(England) Lee Robinson	Plymouth Albion	25	23
1	(England) Leigh Hinton	Orrell	26	23
2	(England) Daren O'Leary	Worcester	26	19
3	(Ireland) Gavin Pfister	Worcester	22	18
4	(England) Dan Ward-Smith	Plymouth Albion	26	16
5	(England) Dave Knight	Pertemps Bees	26	15
6	(Australia) Chris Garrard	Worcester	20	14
7	(England) Nick Easter	Orrell	23	13
8	(England) Nnamdi Obi	Henley Hawks	17	12
8	(England) Gary Truman	Worcester	22	12

== Season records ==
=== Team ===
Largest home win — 79 pts

85 - 6 Exeter Chiefs at home to Manchester on 28 February 2004

Largest away win — 54 pts

54 - 0 Exeter Chiefs away to Wakefield on 13 March 2004

Most points scored — 85 pts

85 - 6 Exeter Chiefs at home to Manchester on 28 February 2004

Most tries in a match — 13

Exeter Chiefs at home to Manchester on 28 February 2004

Most conversions in a match — 10 (x2)

Exeter Chiefs at home to Manchester on 28 February 2004
Orrell at home to Manchester on 10 April 2004

Most penalties in a match — 7

Exeter Chiefs away to Otley on 20 September 2003

Most drop goals in a match — 2

Coventry at home to Worcester on 10 April 2004

=== Player ===
Most points in a match — 31

(England) Leigh Hinton for Orrell at home to Bedford Blues on 6 December 2003

Most tries in a match — 4 (x3)

(England) Dan Ward-Smith for Plymouth Albion at home to Henley Hawks on 20 March 2004
(England) Richard Welding for Orrell at home to Manchester on 10 April 2004
(England) Lee Carruthers for Otley at home to Manchester 13 December 2003

Most conversions in a match — 10 (x2)

(England) Tony Yapp for Exeter Chiefs at home to Manchester on 28 February 2004
(England) Leigh Hinton for Orrell at home to Manchester on 10 April 2004

Most penalties in a match — 7

(England) Tony Yapp for Exeter Chiefs away to Otley on 20 September 2003

Most drop goals in a match — 1

N/A - multiple players

=== Attendances ===
Highest — 6,025

Worcester at home to Pertemps Bees on 24 April 2004

Lowest — 187 (Note: As several attendances are missing this season, it is possible that there were lower attendances than the one recorded.)

Manchester at home to Pertemps Bees on 3 April 2004

Highest Average Attendance — 2,460

Worcester

Lowest Average Attendance — 367 (Note: As Wakefield had 4 home games missing from the attendance statistics, this figure is not 100% accurate.)

Wakefield

== See also ==
- English rugby union system
