= Tony Greig =

South African born English cricketer (1946–2012)

Personal information
- Full name: Anthony William Greig
- Born: 6 October 1946; Queenstown, Cape Province, Union of South Africa
- Died: 29 December 2012 (aged 66); Sydney, New South Wales, Australia
- Height: 6 ft 6 in (1.98 m)
- Batting: Right-handed
- Bowling: Right-arm medium Right-arm off break
- Role: All-rounder
- Relatives: Ian Greig (brother); Norman Curry (brother-in-law)

International information
- National side: England
- Test debut (cap 452): 8 June 1972 v Australia
- Last Test: 30 August 1977 v Australia
- ODI debut (cap 15): 24 August 1972 v Australia
- Last ODI: 6 June 1977 v Australia

Domestic team information
- Years: Team
- 1965/66–1969/70: Border
- 1966–1978: Sussex
- 1970/71–1971/72: Eastern Province

Career statistics
Competition	Test	ODI	FC	LA
Matches	58	22	350	190
Runs scored	3,599	269	16,660	3,899
Batting average	40.43	16.81	31.19	24.67
100s/50s	8/20	0/0	26/96	3/21
Top score	148	48	226	129
Balls bowled	9,802	916	52,513	8,435
Wickets	141	19	856	244
Bowling average	32.20	32.57	28.85	23.15
5 wickets in innings	6	0	33	3
10 wickets in match	2	0	8	0
Best bowling	8/86	4/45	8/25	6/28
Catches/stumpings	87/–	7/–	345/–	88/–
- Source: CricInfo, 28 October 2009

Anthony William Greig (6 October 1946 – 29 December 2012) was a South African–born English cricketer and commentator. Greig qualified to play for the England cricket team by virtue of his Scottish father. He was a tall (6 feet 6 inches; 1.98 metres) all-rounder who bowled both medium pace and off spin. Greig was captain of England from 1975 to 1977, and captained Sussex. His younger brother, Ian, also played Test cricket, while several other members of his extended family played at first-class level.

A leading player in English county cricket, Greig is thought by some former players and pundits to have been one of England's leading international all-rounders. He helped Kerry Packer start World Series Cricket by signing up many of his England colleagues as well as West Indian and Pakistani cricketers, a move which cost him the England captaincy. He is also known for a controversial run-out of Alvin Kallicharran in a Test Match against the West Indies in 1974, and often clashed with Australian fast bowler Dennis Lillee on the 1974–75 Ashes Tour in Australia. His statement in the lead-up to the 1976 tour of England by the West Indies that he intended "to make them grovel" was met with severe criticism, and rebounded on him when the visitors won the series 3–0.

Greig became a commentator following the end of his playing career, later emigrating to Australia. He was diagnosed with lung cancer in October 2012; he died in Sydney on 29 December 2012, from an apparent heart attack.

== Early life and career ==
Greig was born to a Scottish father, Alexander 'Sandy' Greig, an RAF officer posted to Queenstown, Union of South Africa, and a South African-born mother, and was educated at Queen's College, Queenstown. Many former Sussex players had been recruited to coach the cricket team at Queen's College—during Greig's schooldays, Jack Oakes, Alan Oakman, Ian Thomson, Ron Bell, Richard Langridge and Mike Buss all came from overseas for off-season work. All of them noticed Greig's developing abilities which, after a first-class debut for Border in the Currie Cup, led to a trial at Sussex when Greig was 19. Greig's father helped him decide between university study or pursuit of the Sussex offer. "He used to slam into me for not reading enough, for being generally immature. He would look at me sometimes and say 'Boy, when I was your age I was fighting a war', but in the end he grinned and said: 'Go over to England for one year, one year mind, and see what you can do'".

After Greig scored 156 in 230 minutes against a strong Lancashire attack in his first game for Sussex, his future direction changed irrevocably. He wrote a brief note to his father, telling him he would not be coming back to go to university. Greig set a goal of making the England Test team in six years, though he returned to play in South Africa during the winter for a number of years, eventually transferring to Eastern Province for the 1970–71 season.

== Controversy and triumph in the Caribbean ==
Greig was now experimenting with finger-spin to complement his medium pace. He set off to the West Indies with the England team in early 1974 and ran straight into a major controversy. On the second day of the first test at the Queen's Park Oval in Trinidad, the West Indies had cruised to a first innings lead of 143, thanks mainly to 142 not out from Alvin Kallicharran. With four wickets still in hand, the home team was in a dominant position when the last ball of the day was bowled to Bernard Julien, who blocked it past Greig (fielding in close on the off side) and then headed off to the pavilion with Kallicharran. According to Wisden India:

"Julien fended towards Greig's right, and thought he'd seen off the day as he turned around and began walking back. Alan Knott, the England wicketkeeper, seemed to think the same as he dislodged the stumps, but even as he did so, Greig, who had collected the ball, threw down the stumps at the non-striker's end, with Kallicharan already out of the crease, on the way to the dressing room. Greig appealed, and the umpire gave it out. There was confusion as everyone in the venue came to terms with what had happened. Some only realised when the wickets column on the scoreboard ticked over to seven, and according to an ESPNcricinfo piece looking back at the incident, the crowd began to boo. The commentators on radio speculated that, given Knott had dislodged the stumps before Greig broke the stumps, the ball was dead, and on the basis of that, the scoreboard reverted to 274–6.

In a meeting involving the two captains, the West Indies board representatives and England's tour manager Donald Carr, it was decided – after two and a half hours – that Kallicharan would be reinstated, despite the umpire standing by his call. In a press conference the next day – a rest day – the captains announced that, in the "interest of cricket as a whole" the appeal against Kallicharan had been withdrawn. The statement also contained an apology from Greig, with the Englishman and Kallicharan publicly shaking hands when play resumed."

West Indies secured a seven-wicket victory in this test match, Greig making only a modest contribution with the bat. This was not the last time Greig courted controversy both on and off the field.

However, despite this initial setback, Greig dominated the remainder of the series scoring 430 runs at 47.7, taking 24 wickets (most of them with spin) at 22.6, and seven catches. He scored 148 runs, backed up with six wickets, in the third Test in Barbados, 121 in the fourth test in Guyana and won the fifth test in Trinidad for his team with bowling figures of 8 for 86 and 5 for 70. Many of his victims in this game were gained via off-spin, a new addition to the Greig repertoire. This victory enabled England to draw the series.

== Road to the captaincy ==
During the summer of 1974, England faced three Tests against India and three against Pakistan. Overall, Greig averaged 41.5 with the bat and grabbed 14 wickets. His highlight was a century against India at Lord's. This was a good tune-up for the Ashes tour of Australia at year's end, where England would probably start favourite and Greig would be a key player. Shocked by the Australian fast bowling attack of Jeff Thomson and Dennis Lillee, most English batsmen struggled in the first Test at Brisbane. However, Greig played a lone hand with 110 in the first innings.

Greig played in the first World Cup in England in 1975, when his team was eliminated by Australia in the semi-final. Although suited to the one-day game, Greig never really produced a major performance in the 22 ODIs that he played for England. After the tournament ended, Australia stayed on to play four Ashes Tests. England lost the first match at Edgbaston, and blame fell on the captain Mike Denness, who had just endured a 1–4 defeat in Australia. Denness was sacked and Greig appointed, to high expectation that he would play aggressively and fearlessly in an endeavour to counteract the Australians' strengths.

== Commercial skipper ==
The transformation was swift. In the Second Test at Lord's, Greig received a huge ovation on his way to bat and delivered 96 runs. He scored 41 in the second innings and took three wickets in a drawn match that favoured England. The run continued in the next match at Leeds with England poised for victory at the end of the second last day. But vandals destroyed the pitch during the night and Greig agreed to abandon the match, thus conceding the Ashes. The final game ended in a long-winded draw. With a long gap between England commitments, Greig headed to Australia for the 1975–76 season to play grade cricket in Sydney. Greig was well known among colleagues as a man who wanted to take commercial advantage of his profile as a leading sportsman. He signed a number of endorsements and appeared in commercials in Australia, including in his ads for the new breakfast cereal "Nutri-Grain", where his catchphrase "It's just like a cricket bat with holes" struck a chord.

== "I intend to make them grovel" ==
When he returned to England, Greig caused more controversy in the lead-up to the 1976 series against the West Indies. Appearing on television to discuss the coming summer, he spoke of the West Indies players:

I like to think that people are building these West Indians up, because I'm not really sure they're as good as everyone thinks they are. I think people tend to forget it wasn't that long ago they were beaten 5–1 by the Australians and only just managed to keep their heads above water against the Indians just a short time ago as well. Sure, they've got a couple of fast bowlers, but really I don't think we're going to run into anything more sensational than Thomson and Lillee and so really I'm not all that worried about them. You must remember that the West Indians, these guys, if they get on top are magnificent cricketers. But if they're down, they grovel, and I intend, with the help of Closey and a few others, to make them grovel.

The outcry was instantaneous. The word "grovel" had sinister connotations for West Indian people, many of whom have slave ancestry. Moreover, apartheid and the Gleneagles Agreement were prominent issues of the day, so a white South African using the word "grovel" heavily accentuated the faux pas. The West Indian fast bowlers took great delight in adding yards to their run-up when Greig came to the wicket and their supporters took equal delight when his wicket was captured. At times during the series, the West Indies were roundly criticised for their use of short-pitched bowling. To compensate for his unusual height and attempt to combat such bowling, Greig held the bat at shoulder height (rather than leave it on the ground) as the bowler ran in, thus not using a back swing of the bat. While it helped him to combat the short ball, it left him vulnerable to the yorker (full-pitch delivery) and he was bowled quite regularly for a top-order batsman: five times from his nine innings in the Test series, and once more in the second one-day international match. Outside of a formidable performance in the fourth Test at Leeds, where he fought back with 116 and 76 not out and shared a big partnership with wicketkeeper Alan Knott, Greig scored just 51 runs from his other seven innings. Worse, his bowling lost penetration and he took only five wickets as England slumped to a 0–3 series loss. However, Greig did not lose his sense of humour: exaggeratedly playing on his "grovel" comment, he pretended to crawl on his hands and knees in front of the open stands on the Harleyford Road side of The Oval in the last Test match, delighting the crowds that had previously jeered him.

== Redemption in India ==
The best performance of Greig's captaincy career came in 1976–77, when England toured India for a five-Test series. England had not won a Test series on the subcontinent for fifteen years and were clear underdogs against an Indian team that boasted some of the best spinners in the world and could count on the support of tens of thousands of vociferous fans who would fill the stadia. Greig made good use of his experience from his previous tour and consciously set out to build a rapport with the Indian crowd, for instance, playing 'dead' when loud firecrackers went off in the ground. England went on to score one of their most convincing wins in a very long time when they won the first three Tests by huge margins. Greig rated the win at Calcutta, when he scored 103 on a broken pitch, and struggling with a stomach bug, in front of 100,000 Indian fans, as the finest moment of his career. With 342 runs (at 42) and ten wickets, Greig had regained form to take with him to Australia.

== Centenary Test and Packer ==
After a brief sojourn in Sri Lanka, Greig's team arrived in Australia in March 1977 to prepare for a unique moment in the game's history. To commemorate 100 years of Australia vs England Test Matches, a one-off Test was organised for the Melbourne Cricket Ground, the venue of the first-ever Test. The associated functions and a gathering of hundreds of ex-players demonstrated the depth of the game and its history. Greig, recognising the spirit of the fixture, had his team play positively, and the match was still in the balance late on the last day before Australia won by 45 runs. Everyone marvelled at the margin, as it was the same as the first-ever Test, and there was a self-satisfied air to proceedings that would be shattered in just two months' time. Greig had played well in the match (18 and 41, two wickets and four catches) and he left an open letter with a newspaper thanking the people of Melbourne for their support. On his return home, a surprise crew was waiting to film an episode of This Is Your Life. Just weeks before, he had signed a contract with the owner of the Nine Network in Australia, Kerry Packer, to play cricket in a series that would take place during the next Australian summer.

Nevertheless, Greig helped Packer by signing a number of English and foreign players he was acquainted with. Great secrecy cloaked these signings, although Greig dropped a number of hints to friends not involved. The touring Australians arrived in England and they were scheduled to play Greig's Sussex team on 7–10 May 1977. The match was ruined by poor weather, but at a party held at Greig's house during the match, two Australian journalists discovered the secret signings and the news became public. Although Greig had counted on a backlash, he was taken aback by the severity of the condemnation and vitriol that poured in his direction. His central role in the organisation of the breakaway troupe caused much annoyance and surely conflicted with his role as England captain. As the furore continued on, Greig became the focal point for critics, particularly because Packer was still an unknown in Britain. Finally, after a week of politicking, Greig was removed from the England captaincy.

Surprisingly, Greig retained his position in the team for the five Tests under his successor Mike Brearley. Jeering accompanied his appearance for the remainder of that summer. His form proved only average after he made a dramatic 91 at Lord's in the opening Test. England defeated a dispirited Australian team 3–0 to reclaim the Ashes after four games. Brearley convinced the selectors to retain Greig for the last Test, and requested that he received a share of any bonus due to the team. Greig's Test career ended quietly at The Oval on 30 August 1977.

But his work for World Series Cricket (WSC, Packer's organisation) was just beginning. In September, backed by Packer, he was the plaintiff (along with Mike Procter and John Snow) in a case against the English authorities (the TCCB), who were attempting to ban Packer's players from Test and first-class cricket. Greig was conspicuous throughout the trial and elated when the decision went in favour of WSC. The lack of regular domestic cricket as well as the intensity of World Series Cricket brought a premature end to his career as he could not recover from a poor start in the first season. The super-Test final of the 1978–79 season was the last match Greig played at any level of cricket. During an interview on the eve of the match, he "promised" a century to the audience. He fell short by exactly 100 runs, caught behind off his arch rival, Dennis Lillee.

== Epilepsy ==
Greig had his first epileptic seizure at the age of 14, during a tennis match. As he successfully controlled the condition with medication and self-management, largely by sleeping as and when he could during Test Matches. Few knew about it for much of his playing career. He was often forewarned by auras. In 1971–72, he collapsed on the field during his first match for Eastern Province and half a dozen teammates were required to hold down his large frame. The incident was explained away as heat stroke thanks to sympathetic media and team management. Returning from the tour of Australia in 1975, Greig had another epileptic seizure at Heathrow Airport. His condition became public during the Packer furore, when a number of commentators questioned his judgement in the matter and speculated that epilepsy impaired his ability to make decisions.

== Later career ==
After forming a bond with the Nine Network's Kerry Packer during the World Series Cricket days, Greig was offered a "job for life" by Packer as a commentator during Nine's cricket coverage. Greig spent the rest of his life in Australia and continued his commentary role. He was regarded as one of cricket's top commentators in his career, noted for being unbiased, witty, and deeply enthusiastic about the game. His pitch reports, where he would use a car key or a pen to illustrate pitch characteristics or crack sizes (including the odd moment where his implements would become stuck in the pitch), were fondly remembered and imitated by fans. During the 2006 Ashes Perth Test, on commenting on the need for England's Steve Harmison to intimidate Australia's number 11 Glenn McGrath, Greig indicated the need to "Touch him up, before rolling him over".

Greig commentated for Channel Four in the United Kingdom, the SABC when making occasional trips home, and for Sky Sports' coverage of England's 2012 tour of Sri Lanka. He also hosted a regular weekly podcast called The Tony Greig Show for Cricinfo, covering international cricket matters and airing his forthright views in a section called "What's eating Tony Greig this week?". His love of the game may be encapsulated by a comment he made on Cricinfo in mid-2012: "Give your hand to cricket and it will take you on the most fantastic journey, a lifetime journey both on and off the field."

In 1999, Greig was involved in a controversy when, in a match at the North Sydney Oval, the camera zoomed onto a white, Caucasian man and an Asian woman in a marriage ceremony at a nearby church. Greig made a comment implying the woman shown was a mail-order bride: "Do you think she's been flown in?". He later said that the comment was made "off microphone and not intended for broadcast". He joined the Indian Cricket League as an executive board member, but the league ultimately ceased relations due to the growing popularity of Indian Premier League. Greig was a member of the Marylebone Cricket Club (MCC).

Outside of cricket media, he served as a board member of Epilepsy Action Australia for 19 years up to his death. In March 2011, he was appointed as the brand ambassador for Sri Lanka Tourism. Initially, the appointment was for six months, for which he received about US$10,000 (A$16,331 in 2021 terms).

On 26 June 2012, Greig delivered the MCC Spirit of Cricket Cowdrey Lecture and criticised the BCCI for misuse of powers and money and continuously rejecting the ICC's call for universal acceptance of the Umpire Decision Review System. He also asked the BCCI to abandon self-interest and "embrace the spirit of cricket and govern in the best interests of world cricket, not just for India and its business partners."

Tony Greig is regarded fondly by Sri Lankan cricket fans. He would often take the opportunity to advertise the country as a tourist destination during his commentary. A thinly veiled fictionalised version of Greig as a TV pundit living a rockstar lifestyle behind the scenes appeared in the Gratiaen-, Commonwealth-, and DSC South Asian Literature prize–winning novel Chinaman: The Legend of Pradeep Mathew by Shehan Karunatilaka.

== Lung cancer and death ==
Greig began to have severe bouts of coughing in May 2012; initially, bronchitis was diagnosed. After undergoing tests, a small but malignant lesion was found in his right lung. He was diagnosed with lung cancer in October 2012. He underwent an operation for the cancer in November, and the same month he told fellow commentator Mark Nicholas during an interview broadcast by the Nine Network that "It's not good. The truth is I've got lung cancer. It's now just a question of what they can do."

Greig died at St Vincent's Hospital in Sydney on 29 December 2012 after going into cardiac arrest following a suspected heart attack. He was 66.

== Cited sources ==
- Tossell, David, Tony Greig, A Reappraisal of English Cricket's Most Controversial Captain, Pitch Publishing, 2011. ISBN 978-1-908051-01-1

Sporting positions
Preceded by Mike Denness	English national cricket captain 1975–1977	Succeeded by Mike Brearley
Preceded by Alan Knott	England ODI Captain; 1976	Succeeded by Mike Brearley
Preceded by Mike Griffith	Sussex county cricket captain 1973–1977	Succeeded by Arnold Long
