= Phillip Hodson (cricketer) =

English cricketer and cricket administrator (born 1951)

Personal information
- Full name: Richard Phillip Hodson
- Born: 26 April 1951 (age 75); Horbury, Yorkshire, England
- Batting: Right-handed
- Bowling: Right-arm medium
- Relatives: Will Hodson (son); Tony Greig (brother-in-law); Ian Greig (brother-in-law)

Domestic team information
- Years: Team
- 1971–1973: Cambridge University

Career statistics
Competition	First-class	List A
Matches	19	4
Runs scored	687	61
Batting average	20.81	15.25
100s/50s	1/2	0/0
Top score	111	27
Balls bowled	1,845	12
Wickets	29	0
Bowling average	26.41	–
5 wickets in innings	0	–
10 wickets in match	0	–
Best bowling	4/54	–
Catches/stumpings	8/–	0/–
- Source: Cricinfo, 12 August 2020

Richard Phillip Hodson (born 26 April 1951) is an English former first-class cricketer, cricket administrator and businessman.

Hodson was born at Horbury in April 1951. He was educated in Wakefield at Queen Elizabeth Grammar School, before going up to Downing College, Cambridge. While studying at Cambridge, he played first-class cricket for Cambridge University, making his debut against Surrey in 1971. Hodson played first-class cricket for Cambridge until 1973, making eighteen appearances. An all-rounder, he scored 677 runs in his eighteen matches at an average of 21.15. He scored one century for Cambridge, making 111 against Kent in 1973. With his right-arm medium pace bowling he took 26 wickets at a bowling average of 26.80, with best figures of 4 for 54. In addition to playing first-class cricket for Cambridge, he also made a single appearance for a combined Oxford and Cambridge Universities cricket team against the touring New Zealanders at Fenner's in 1973. Hodson also played List A one-day cricket for Cambridge University in the 1972 Benson & Hedges Cup, making four appearances.

After graduating from Cambridge, Hodson made regular appearances for the Yorkshire seconds, but did not feature for the first eleven. Away from cricket, he started a small business in 1977 and progressed to become the chief executive of The Oval Group, one of largest privately owned corporate insurance brokers in the United Kingdom. He was appointed president of the Marylebone Cricket Club in 2011, succeeding Christopher Martin-Jenkins. He was the first Yorkshireman to be MCC president since Sir William Worsley fifty years previously.

Hodson is married to Sally Ann Hodson (née Greig), the sister of the England cricketers Tony and Ian Greig. Their son Will has played cricket at first-class level.
