= Purple Day =

Event for raising awareness of epilepsy

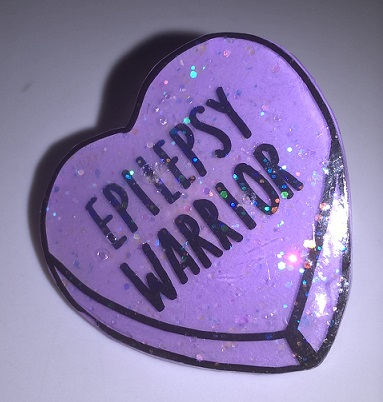

Purple Day is a global grassroots event that was formed with the intention to increase worldwide awareness of epilepsy, and to dispel common myths and fears of this neurological disorder. Further intentions of this movement are to reduce the social stigmas commonly endured by many individuals afflicted with the condition, to provide assurance and advocacy to those living with epilepsy, and to encourage individuals living with the condition to take action in their communities to achieve these aims. The day occurs annually on March 26.

== Formation and history ==
The concept of Purple Day was initiated by a nine-year-old Canadian named Cassidy Megan, and was motivated by her own struggle with epilepsy. The first Purple Day event was held on March 26, 2008, and is now known as the Purple Day for Epilepsy campaign. The Epilepsy Association of Nova Scotia joined Cassidy and helped to spread awareness of Cassidy's initiative.

In 2009, the New York-based Anita Kaufmann Foundation and Epilepsy Association of Nova Scotia joined to launch Purple Day internationally and increase the involvement of organizations, schools, businesses, politicians and celebrities. On March 26, 2009, over 100,000 students, 95 workplaces and 116 politicians participated in Purple Day. In March 2009, the official USA Purple Day Party launch was organized by the Anita Kaufmann Foundation. Canadian Paul Shaffer of the Late Show with David Letterman attended the official launch at Dylan's Candy Bar in New York City.

In March 2012, Purple Day received the Royal Assent and became a legal day for epilepsy awareness in Canada.

In December 2015, electronics retailer Dick Smith had arranged a major corporate partnership with Epilepsy Action Australia to support Purple Day in Australia with a $50,000 cash sponsorship, prizes and exclusive distribution of Purple Day merchandise. A week prior to Purple Day celebrations in 2016, Dick Smith was placed in receivership. Later, the Retail Food Group provided a $50,000 donation to match Dick Smith's previously promised sponsorship.

== Description ==
Purple Day is held annually on March 26. Supporters are encouraged to wear a purple-coloured item of clothing. Purple is the international color for epilepsy and is also a color that symbolizes solitude.

The goal of Purple Day is to increase general public awareness, to reduce the social stigma endured by many individuals with the condition, and to empower individuals living with epilepsy to take action in their communities.

Purple Day is celebrated in Australia to fund various epilepsy support organisations including Epilepsy Australia, Epilepsy Queensland, and Epilepsy Foundation.

During the 2018 edition of Purple Day, the Epilepsy Care Alliance called on the technology sector to push further innovations for the treatment for epilepsy.

=== Guinness World Record ===
In 2017, a Guinness World Record was reached during Purple Day by the Anita Kaufmann Foundation for the achievement of the largest ever epilepsy training session.

== Cited works and further reading ==
- Grant, Colin (2016). A Smell of Burning: The Story of Epilepsy. London: Boxtree Books. ISBN 978-0-224-10182-0.
