= Nick Lloyd =

Nick Lloyd may refer to:

- Nick Lloyd (rugby union)
- Nick Lloyd (historian)
