= Jonathan Lowe =

Jonathan Lowe may refer to:

- E. J. Lowe (Edward Jonathan Lowe, 1950–2014, known as Jonathan Lowe), British philosopher and academic
- Jonathan Lowe (cricketer) (born 1977), English cricketer and British Army officer
- Sean Lowe (baseball) (Jonathan Sean Lowe, born 1971), American baseball player
