= Reg Bolton =

Reg Bolton may refer to:

- Reg Bolton (clown) (1945–2006), British clown, teacher, actor and writer
- Reg Bolton (rugby union) (1909–2006), English rugby union international
