= Charles Oakes (cricketer) =

English cricketer

Personal information
- Full name: Charles Oakes
- Born: 10 August 1912; Horsham, Sussex, England
- Died: 19 December 2007 (aged 95); Tonbridge, Kent, England
- Batting: Right-handed
- Bowling: Leg-break and googly
- Role: All-rounder
- Relatives: Brother Jack

Domestic team information
- Years: Team
- 1935–1954: Sussex

Career statistics
Competition	First-class
Matches	288
Runs scored	10,893
Batting average	25.09
100s/50s	14/47
Top score	160
Balls bowled	26,509
Wickets	458
Bowling average	31.27
5 wickets in innings	16
10 wickets in match	–
Best bowling	8/147
Catches/stumpings	168/–
- Source: CricketArchive, 9 December 2024

Charles Oakes (10 August 1912 – 19 December 2007) was an English cricketer active from 1935 to 1954 who played for Sussex. He was born in Horsham and died in Tonbridge. A noted all rounder, he appeared in 288 first-class matches as a righthanded batsman who bowled leg break and googly (LBG). He scored 10,893 runs with a highest score of 160 among fourteen centuries and took 458 wickets with a best performance of eight for 147. Oakes was awarded his county cap by Sussex in 1937 and had a benefit season in 1954 which raised £4,100. He was the elder brother of Jack Oakes.
