= Roger Clifford Carrington =

British archaeologist

Roger Clifford Carrington (1906–1971) was an English classical scholar, archaeologist and teacher. He was headmaster of St. Olave's and St. Saviour's Grammar School for Boys from 1937 to 1970.

== Early life ==
Carrington was educated at Queen Elizabeth Grammar School, Wakefield and Queen's College, Oxford. As a postgraduate, he carried out archaeological research on the comparative dating of houses in ancient Pompeii, and was awarded a doctorate for this work. Articles and books from this period of his life are still cited today in scholarly works. For example, an article he published in 1931, "Studies in the Campanian 'Villae Rusticae'", was described by William Vernon Harris in 1989 as still giving "the best overall impression of the territory"; and the apparently innocuous "Notes on the Building Materials of Pompeii" of 1933 was cited in the 1997 book Naked Truths: Women, Sexuality and Gender in Classical Art and Archaeology. His book Pompeii (1936) is still on university reading lists as a standard work on its subject.

== Teaching career ==
Despite being well placed in his twenties to pursue a distinguished academic career, Carrington chose teaching, first at Haileybury in Hertfordshire, and then at Dulwich College as Senior Classics Master. Then in 1937, in his early thirties, he was appointed to the headship of St. Olave's and St. Saviour's Grammar School. In 1939, with war imminent, he married Charlotte Chalmers.

As headmaster of St. Olave's during the Second World War, he oversaw the evacuation of the school away from the bombing of London, initially to Uckfield and Buxted in Sussex, and then to Torquay (1939–1945).

In 1948 he received the Medaglia di Benemerenza from the Italian government, honouring him both as an educationalist and as an archaeologist. (The date, 13 June 1948, marked the bicentenary of the excavation of Pompeii.)

Following the war the school made steady progress under his leadership. It was during his tenure that the decision to move St Olave's from its inner-city location near Tower Bridge to suburban Orpington was made (1957), and the move was realised in 1968 while he was still headmaster. However he was an authoritarian figure, not well liked by his pupils.

Helped by St Olave's Antiquarian Society, he wrote a history of the school, Two Schools: A History of the St. Olave's and St. Saviour's Grammar School Foundation. A short interim volume of the history was published in 1962 for the quatercentenary of the charter of St Saviour's Grammar School. The fuller second edition was published by the governors of the foundation in 1971 in commemoration of the quatercentenary of the charter of St Olave's Grammar School. The onset of illness in 1970 prevented Dr Carrington from completing the book, despite having "completed the writing of almost all of the text before this". The supervision of the final stages of preparing the book was taken over by E. S. Wood, secretary of the Antiquarian Society, and by J. R. Hawkins, the acting headmaster. The book includes an account of Carrington's own career at St Olave's, written presumably by Hawkins and/or Wood.

He was the general editor of The Alpha Classics series published by George Bell & Sons.

Dr Carrington died the following year aged 65.

== Works ==
- "Studies in the Campanian 'Villae Rusticae'", Journal of Roman Studies 21 (1931), 110–130.
- "The Etruscans and Pompeii", Antiquity vol 6:21 (1932) pp. 5–23.
- "The Ancient Italian Town-House". Antiquity vol 7:26 (1933) 133–152.
- "Notes on the Building Materials of Pompeii", Journal of Roman Studies vol. 23 (1933) pp. 125–38.
- "Some Ancient Italian Country-Houses", Antiquity vol 8:31 (1934) pp. 261–280.
- Pompeii (Oxford: Clarendon Press, 1936).
- Two Schools: A History of the St. Olave's and St. Saviour's Grammar School Foundation (London: The Governors of the St. Olave's and St. Saviour's Grammar School Foundation, 1971).
