= Martin Dyson =

English cricketer and schoolmaster (1935–2019)

Personal information
- Full name: Edward Martin Dyson
- Born: 21 October 1935; Sandal, Wakefield, Yorkshire, England
- Died: 22 December 2019 (aged 84); Winchester, Hampshire, England
- Batting: Right-handed

Domestic team information
- Years: Team
- 1958–1960: Oxford University

Career statistics
Competition	First-class
Matches	27
Runs scored	819
Batting average	18.20
100s/50s	0/3
Top score	68*
Balls bowled	18
Wickets	0
Bowling average	–
5 wickets in innings	–
10 wickets in match	–
Best bowling	–
Catches/stumpings	16/–
- Source: Cricinfo, 19 April 2020

Edward Martin Dyson (21 October 1935 – 22 December 2019) was an English cricketer and schoolmaster who played first-class cricket for Oxford University from 1958 to 1960.

Martin Dyson attended Queen Elizabeth Grammar School, Wakefield, from 1947 to 1954, before going up to Keble College, Oxford. A batsman who sometimes opened the innings, he made his highest first-class score of 68 not out in Oxford's innings victory over Free Foresters in 1960.

After leaving Oxford he taught at St Paul's School in London, Eton College, and Ludgrove School in Berkshire. He and his wife Evelyn had a son and a daughter.
