= William Guest (rugby union) =

English rugby union player

Major William Guest MBE
- Born: William Guest; 20 October 1903 Hemsworth, West Yorkshire
- Died: 7 June 1991 (aged 87) Wakefield
- School: QEGS Wakefield
- University: Oxford University
- Occupation: Manufacturing confectioners agent

Rugby union career
- Position: Fullback
Amateur team(s)
Years	Team	Apps	(Points)
- South Elmsall RFC
–	Wakefield RFC		
–	Yorkshire		

William Guest MBE (1903–1991) was a rugby player for Wakefield RFC, a major in the Territorial Army and was awarded the MBE for services to Army sport.

William Guest was from Ackworth, near Wakefield and educated at QEGS Wakefield from 1913 to 1921.

He played for the school team and captained it during the 1921/22 season with a playing record of 18 wins in 22 games.

The QEGS 1874–1987 A history of school rugby booklet described him

"His experience of many seasons at full back has made him a most useful kick and his tackling has always been most fearless. Playing at three-quarter this season and although his passing has at times been erratic, his grit and determination has been invaluable. Fearless as a player and as a captain. Has developed that frequently neglected or over looked factor of success, the morale of the side. He has proved himself a real leader and captain of the most successful fifteen the school has had for many years"

He also played for South Elmsall RFC before joining Wakefield RFC in 1923 until his retirement through injury in 1939, playing in 372 games – the fourth highest number of games for the club. He was captain of Wakefield between 1928 and 1936 (two spells), Honorary secretary between 1933 and 1939 and club president between 1980 and 1989. He also held posts at Wakefield Sports Club limited and remained active at the rugby club until his death. His contribution to the club was described in Wakefield Rugby Football Club—1901–2001 A Centenary History book as "probably unsurpassed".

He also represented Yorkshire 22 times between 1922 and 1928 and was in the county team that won the County Championship by beating Cornwall at Bradford in 1928.

In 1940 he was called up as a member of the Army Officer's Emergency Reserve to the 6th Gordon Highlanders and served throughout the war in North Africa, Italy and the Far East, where he served with the Special Operations Executive (SOE). He served for a time as a staff officer and left with the rank of major.

In 1946 he joined the TA when it was reformed and received a commission in the King's Own Yorkshire Light Infantry, transferring in 1954 to the Army Cadet Force.

In January 1971 he was awarded the MBE for his work as County Sports officer for the Army Cadet Force.

He was a manufacturing confectioners agent.
