= Sidney Hayward =

British barrister and legal writer

Sidney Pascoe Hayward MC QC
- Born: 8 September 1896
- Died: 11 February 1961 (aged 64); Andover, Hampshire, England
- Education: Queen Elizabeth Grammar School, Wakefield; Jesus College, Oxford
- Occupations: Barrister, legal writer
- Known for: Legal writing
- Awards: Military Cross

Sidney Pascoe Hayward MC QC (8 September 1896 – 11 February 1961) was a British barrister and legal writer.

== Life ==
Hayward was the son of Albert Edward Hayward, rector of Emley in West Yorkshire. After education at Queen Elizabeth Grammar School, Wakefield, Hayward served from 1914 to 1919 during the First World War with the 7th Battalion of the Duke of Wellington's Regiment, winning the Military Cross. He then studied at Jesus College, Oxford and was called to the bar by Middle Temple in 1923. He wrote on the Law of Town and County Planning (1933) and the Law of Housing (1937), took silk in 1936 and was made a bencher of Middle Temple in 1953. He died in Andover at his home on 11 February 1961, aged 64.
