= College Grove (sports ground) =

Sport facility in West Yorkshire, England

Coordinates: 53°41′22.90″N 1°29′46.70″W

College Grove (Sports Ground)
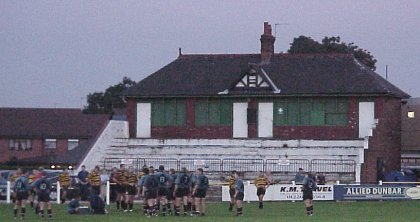
- Interactive map of College Grove (Sports Ground)
- Full name: College Grove
- Location: Wakefield, West Yorkshire, England
- Owner: Wakefield Sports Club (College Grove) Ltd.
- Capacity: 4,000 (500 seats)

Construction
- Opened: 1848

Tenant
- Wakefield F.C. Wakefield Hockey Club

College Grove sports ground is a multi sport facility in Wakefield, West Yorkshire, England. It is owned and run by Wakefield Sports Club (College Grove) Ltd.

The current main users of the ground are Wakefield Hockey Club, Wakefield Rifle and Pistol Club, Wakefield Bowls Club and Wakefield Squash Club.

== Location ==
The sports ground is located on the edge of Wakefield city centre on Eastmoor Road. It is enclosed on the north side by Eastmoor Road, the south by Smirthwaite Street, houses on Pinderfields Road on the east and houses on College Grove view on the west. The Ordnance Survey map reference is SE3321NW.

It was previously home to former rugby union side Wakefield RFC who were based at the ground between 1935 and 2004. A club source in 1990 estimated the ground capacity to be around 4,000, with 500 seated in the grandstand and around 3,500 standing (Note: The club source for the 1990 ground capacity actually had standing between 3,500-4,000 standing but a lower estimate seems more accurate given that maximum crowds historically were around the 4,000 figure. which includes 500 seated in the stand.), and there was a club house and floodlights. The club did attract several attendances of 4,000 in the 1975–76 John Player Cup against Moseley and Northampton albeit with temporary seating.

== History ==
In 1847, a bowling club started playing on the Smirthwaite Street green. A year later, Wakefield Cricket Club was formed to play on Grove Hall grounds, which neighbour the existing ground. A new club was formed as Wakefield Cricket and Bowling Club.

In July 1873, a united South of England side played a game against a local 22 and, in 1878, Yorkshire played a game there. However the ground proved to be too small for first class cricket, although Yorkshire's second 11 continued to play on the ground until the 1960s.

In 1896, tennis joined the club, probably with the addition of two grass courts. The current bowling greens were added in 1921. The clubhouse covers the original green. The grounds were leased for £65 per annum. In 1928, the club purchased the grounds for £3,000 and a limited company, Wakefield Cricket and Athletic Club, was formed. The playing area was extended in 1934 to Smirthwaite Street, covering a rubbish tip.

In May 1935, Wakefield RFC moved to the ground. For the next fifty-four years, until the demise of the cricket club, the two sports shared the pitch (the rugby pitch overlapping the edge of the cricket field), with no rugby access before mid-September and after the first weekend in April.

Wakefield Harriers Athletic Club was based at the ground between 1937 and 1949. In July 1938, one of their meetings attracted 3,000 spectators.

In 1947, the cricket club celebrated its centenary by holding a week long festival of sport which attracted 30,000 people including 7,000 for an athletic meeting. "So great was the in rush of spectators shortly after the start of the meeting that the gates had twice to be temporary closed pending a more equitable distribution of people inside the enclosure."

In 1950, Queen Elizabeth Grammar School (QEGS) were allowed access to the ground for one afternoon per week.

The tennis club added two shale courts in 1953. In the early 1990s, the club sold the area by the tennis courts for housing. In 1955, the rugby club built a 220-seat stand, which remained in place until the current stand replaced it in 1984. The current structure originally seated 500 on wooden benches but these were later replaced by plastic tip up seats lowering the capacity. A year later, lights for rugby use were installed and in 1959 the clubhouse was extended – the current lounge.

Sandal Hockey club moved to the ground in 1961 and, in 1965, a new tennis pavilion and changing rooms were built for £7,000. The addition of new sports prompted a change in the club name to Wakefield Sports Club (College Grove) Limited. £22,000 was spent in 1972 on two squash courts, rugby baths and changing rooms. Wakefield Rifle and Pistol club joined in 1975 and an additional two squash courts and rifle and pistol ranges were built at a cost of £36,000.

Wakefield RFC's successful John Player cup run in 1976 saw the addition of temporary stands and record rugby crowds of 4,000. The rugby club mounted advertising boards around the rugby ground in 1977. A refurbishment of the club house took place in 1979 and, two years later, a glass-backed squash court and central heating were added at a cost of £36,000. In 1981/2, Community Industry helped upgrade the rugby terracing. In November 1986, Wakefield RFC switched on their new floodlights with a game against Moseley. Between February and November 1987, the rugby club converted a redundant squash court into two new rugby changing rooms, also adding a medical room, weights/gym and referee's rooms at a cost of £35,000, covered in part by a RFU loan repayable over 10 years and a £4,000 Sports Council loan repayable over 5 years.

Wakefield Cricket Club folded in 1989 leaving the way open for the hockey club to install a sand-based artificial pitch and for the rugby club to leave the floodlights in place all year round; previously they had to remove the ones on the overlapping cricket side of the ground during the cricket season.

In 1993, Bill Rhodes, a former Wakefield RFC player, left a bequest to the club, which led to the Rhodes Pavilion, a portakabin structure, being added, functioning as an office and hospitality area for the rugby club. A few years later, a second portakabin structure, the Fleur de Lys pavilion, was built above the car park behind the rugby posts at the Smirthwaite end of the ground. This included a viewing balcony together with a kitchen and small bar. In the late 1990s, the rugby club added temporary tip-up seating on the hockey side of the rugby field. In 2002, the hockey club replaced the sand-based surface with a state-of-the-art water-based pitch and added a multi-use games area suitable for five-a-side football. A Sports Council award of £900,000 to cover the £1,055,000 project financed this.

The cricket pavilion was finally demolished in 2003, while the hockey club built a new building including changing rooms, lecture room, offices and storage space. The rugby club played its last game on the ground in April 2004, subsequently folding as a club and disposing of its assets, including the Fleur de Lys pavilion and the temporary tip-up seating. The rugby pitch was subsequently used by local football teams before Wakefield FC moved to the ground for the start of the 2006/7 season, making improvements to the perimeter fencing, external fencing and installing a turnstile block.

In 2011, Carr Gate FC were one of the last teams to win a cup final at College Grove, defeating Peacock FC on penalties. Carr Gates' goalkeeper scored in injury time of extra time (121st minute) making the final score 2-2, to send the game to penalties. Carr Gate won the Wakefield Sunday League Division 4 cup in their first season.

The grass pitch has been replaced by a further AstroTurf pitch, and was used by the Chinese Olympic hockey team in preparation for the 2012 Olympic Games.

The club house is also used by Wakefield Jazz Club.

== Sources ==
- David Ingall, Wakefield Rugby Football Club—1901-2001 A Centenary History (2001)
- Wakefield RFC programmes - various dates
- Groundtastic magazine, issue 46, autumn 2006
- Chris Harte, Britain's Rugby Grounds ISBN 1-901347-11-7
- Martin Cunnane, Wakefield Harriers - the first 100 years ISBN 978-0-9525200-0-9
