= Stuart Jones (historian) =

British historian

Hugh Stuart Jones is a British historian, currently Professor of Intellectual History at the University of Manchester. He was born in West Yorkshire and educated at Queen Elizabeth Grammar School, Wakefield, and at St Catherine's College, Oxford, where he took a First in Modern History in 1983. He worked for his DPhil at Nuffield College, Oxford, where he also held a research fellowship (1986-8). After teaching for two years at New College, Oxford, he moved to Manchester in 1990. He was head of the History Department from 2000 to 2003 and associate dean for Postgraduate Research in the Faculty of Humanities (2017-20). He held a Leverhulme Major Research Fellowship 2020-23, during which he completed a biography of James Bryce.

Jones is best known for his work on French and British political thought of the nineteenth and twentieth centuries, on the intellectual history of Victorian Britain, and on the history of universities. He is an authority on the intellectual history of liberalism, and on the idea of the civic university. In 2024 he edited Manchester Minds, a collection of essays marking the University of Manchester's bicentennial celebrations.

== Publications ==
- The French State in Question: Public Law and Political Argument in the Third Republic (1993)
- (ed) Auguste Comte: Early Political Writings (1998)
- Victorian Political Thought (2000)
- Intellect and Character in Victorian England: Mark Pattison and the Invention of the Don (2007)
- (ed, with J. Wright) Pluralism and the Idea of the Republic in France (2012)
- (ed) Manchester Minds: A University History of Ideas (2024)
- (ed, with J. Ayshford and others) The Simons of Manchester: How One Family Shaped a City and a Nation (2024)
- (ed) Higher Learning and Civic Cultures of Knowledge: Manchester 1824-2024, special issue of the Bulletin of the John Rylands Library 100.2 (Autumn 2024)
- Liberal Worlds: James Bryce and the Democratic Intellect (Princeton UP, 2025)
