= William Sharp (homeopath) =

English surgeon and physician

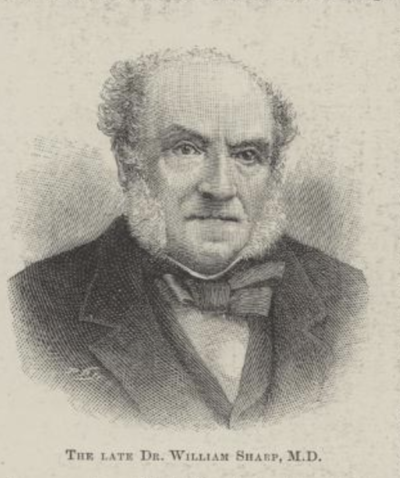
- Born: 1805; Armley, Leeds
- Died: 1897 (aged 91–92); Llandudno
- Resting place: Llan-rhos
- Education: Wakefield Grammar School, Westminster School
- Occupation: Surgeon
- Known for: science teaching, museums and homeopathy
- Spouse(s): Anne (1811–1834) (born Hailstone); Emma (born Scott)

William Sharp (1805–1896) was an English surgeon and physician. Sharp is credited with first advocating the establishment of local museums in Britain and for putting science on the curricula of British public schools. He was the first science teacher in a British public school and an early advocate of homoeopathy.

== Life and career ==
Sharp was born at Armley, which is now part of Leeds in Yorkshire, on 21 January 1805 to Richard and Mary (born Turton) Sharp. His father was a merchant who already had two sons and two daughters. The Sharp family was notable in Yorkshire, and its members included, John Sharp who had been an Archbishop of York, and Abraham Sharp a mathematician and astronomer.

William's education was initially undertaken by his uncle at Wakefield Grammar School until he joined Westminster School in 1817. He learnt to be a surgeon from another uncle (also William) who lived in William's home town, and then in Leeds with William Hey. He completed his training in surgery at Borough hospitals in London and became a qualified surgeon in 1827. After a brief period working in Paris, he rejoined his uncle and took over his business in 1833. He worked for the Bradford Infirmary and became its senior surgeon in 1837 although he was still interested in science in general. He re-established the Bradford Philosophical Society and in 1840 was elected a fellow of the Royal Society after reading a paper to the Birmingham meeting of the British Association. He had proposed that local museums should be established in each town across the country.

Sharp lived and worked in Hull for four years before ending up in Rugby so that his sons could attend Rugby School. He continued to advocate the importance of science, and the school added this subject to its curriculum. He was briefly employed by Rugby School as the first science teacher in a public school. Sharp resigned in 1850 to return to medicine and research.

Sharp became interested in homoeopathy, and over the next forty years he published over 60 papers dealing with this subject which he believed central to combining other more conventional approaches to medicine. His tracts on homeopathy went through several editions. Sharp's papers were not always well received. Unlike most homoeopaths he believed in antipraxy which proposes that some drugs may have totally different results at different doses.

Sharp died at Llandudno in 1896 and is buried at Llan-rhos on the Welsh coast.
