= Daniel Cresswell =

- Born: 1776; Wakefield
- Died: 1844; Enfield
- Education: Wakefield grammar school and Trinity College, Cambridge
- Occupations: divine and mathematician
- Parent: Daniel Cresswell

Daniel Cresswell D.D. (1776 – 21 March 1844), was a British clergyman and mathematician.

He was son of Daniel Cresswell, a native of Crowden-le-Booth, in Edale, Derbyshire, who lived for many years at Newton, near Wakefield, Yorkshire. He was born at Wakefield in 1776 and educated in the grammar school there and at Hull. He proceeded to Trinity College, Cambridge, of which he became a fellow (B.A. 1797, M.A. 1800, D.D. per literas regia, 1823). At the university, where he resided many years, he took private pupils.

In December 1822 he was presented to the vicarage of Enfield, one of the most valuable livings in the gift of his college, and in the following year he was appointed a justice of the peace for Middlesex and elected a Fellow of the Royal Society. He died at Enfield on 21 March 1844.

== Major works ==
- The Elements of Linear Perspective, Cambridge, 1811, a translation of Giuseppe Venturoli's Elements of Mechanics, Cambridge, 1822; 2nd edit., 1823
- Sermons on Domestic Duties London 1829.
