= John McDougall (phthisiologist) =

Scotland international rugby union player

John MacDougall
- Born: John Bowes MacDougall; 5 December 1890 Greenock, Scotland
- Died: 30 September 1967 (aged 76) Athens, Greece
- Occupation: Doctor

Rugby union career
- Position: Lock
Amateur team(s)
Years	Team	Apps	(Points)
- Greenock Wanderers
–	Wakefield		
International career
Years	Team	Apps	(Points)
1913–1921	Scotland	5	(0)

John Bowes MacDougall CBE FRSE FRCPE (1890–1967) was a 20th-century physician and phthisiologist who also was a Scottish international rugby union player who won five caps between 1913 and 1921. He was a world expert in the field of tuberculosis. As an unusual pastime he was interested in rabbit breeding.

== Life ==
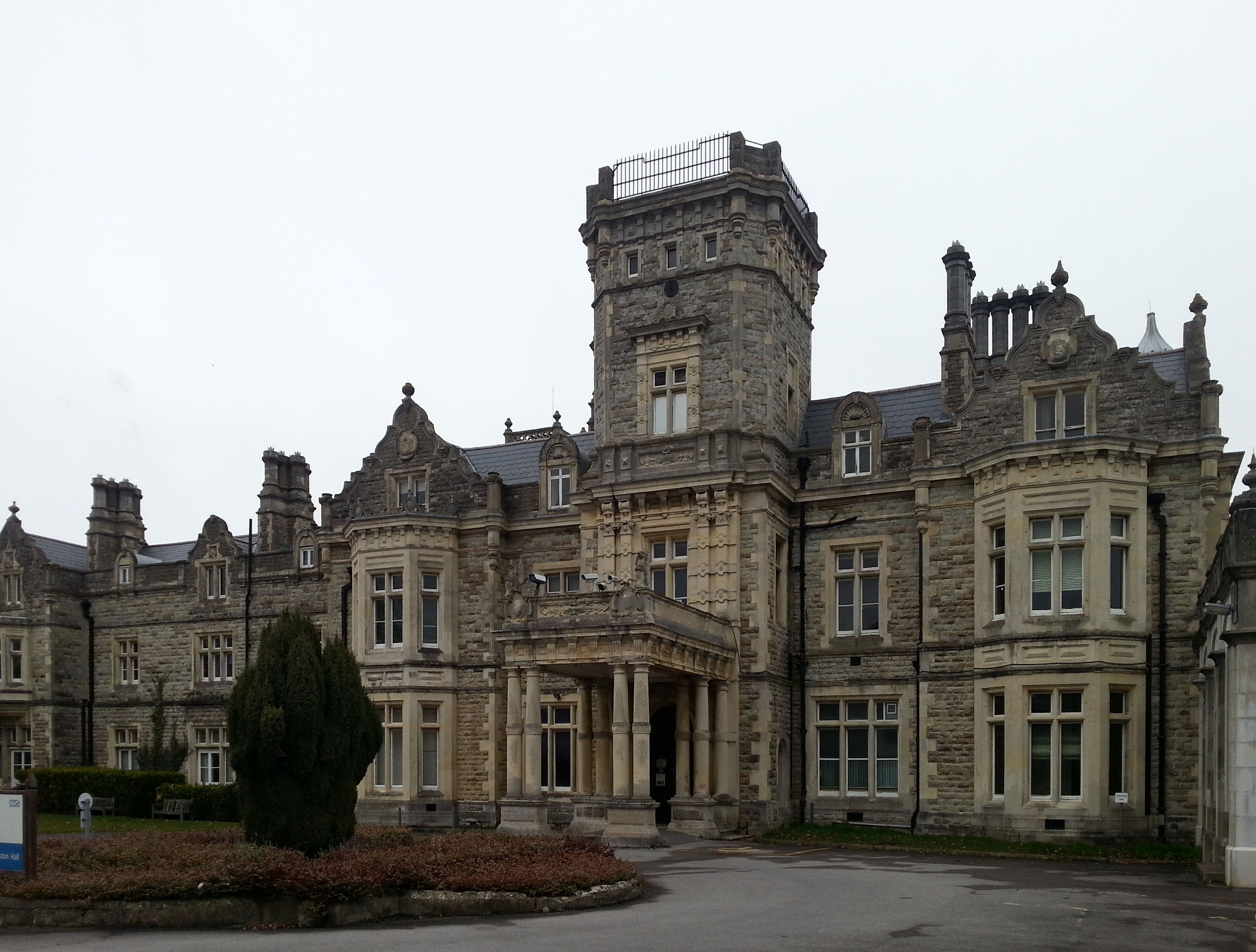
Preston Hall

He was born in Greenock on 5 December 1890 the son of Allan McDougall. He was educated at Greenock Academy.

He studied medicine at Glasgow University graduating MB ChB in 1914. He received a commission in the First World War and served as a major in the Royal Army Medical Corps at the No 30 General Hospital in Calais, France. He received his doctorate (MD) in 1916, while on active service.

In 1924 he became medical director of the Preston Hall Sanatorium near Maidstone, Kent. In 1931 he was elected a fellow of the Royal Society of Edinburgh. His proposers were Sir George Newman, Noel Dean Bardswell, Sir Frederick Menzies and Donald McIntyre. In the 1943 New Year's Honours List he was created a Commander of the Order of the British Empire (CBE).

In 1945 he left Preston Hall to become Chief Tuberculosis Officer for the World Health Organization, the highest position in his field of expertise.

He died in Athens in Greece on 30 September 1967 aged 76.

== Rugby career ==
He played club rugby for Greenock Wanderers and Wakefield RFC.

He originally joined Wakefield RFC on being posted to the West Riding County Council as Chief Tuberculosis Officer. In 1947 he became Chief of the Tuberculosis section of the World Health Organization.

He organised Wakefield RFC's 'Coming of age' fete and Bazaar in 1922.

== Publications ==
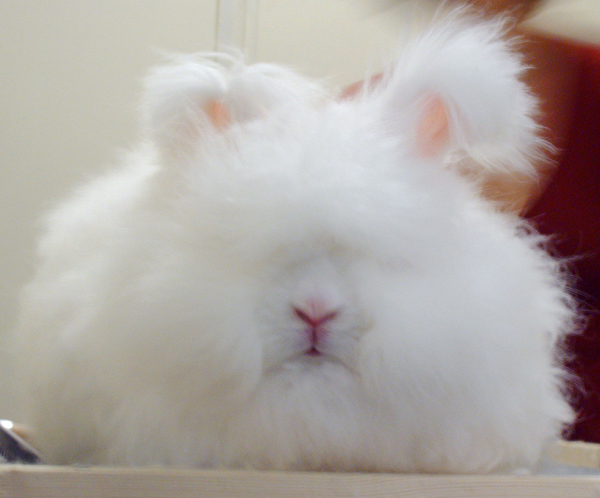
A white English Angora rabbit

- How to Become an Efficient Athlete (1922)
- The Rabbit in Health and Disease (1929)
- Angoras in the Colonies (1932)
- Rehabilitating the Tuberculous (1945)
- Rabbit Keeping (1946)
- Tuberculosis: A Global Study of Social Pathology (1949)

== Family ==
He married twice. In 1920 he married Sarah Purdy Shepherd. In 1954 he married Marietta Tsitsecles from Greece.
