= Graham Marshall (rugby union) =

Scotland international rugby union player

- Born: Graham Robert Marshall; 23 May 1960 (age 66) Glasgow

Rugby union career
- Position: Flanker/No 8.
Amateur team(s)
| Years | Team | Apps | (Points) |
- Selkirk
| – | Wakefield | | |
Provincial / State sides
| Years | Team | Apps | (Points) |
- Scottish Exiles
International career
| Years | Team | Apps | (Points) |
| 1987-88 | Scotland 'B' | 2 | (0) |
| 1990-91 | Scotland 'A' | 2 | (0) |
| 1988–91 | Scotland | 4 | (0) |

Graham Marshall (born 23 May 1960) is a former Scotland international rugby union player. His regular playing position was Flanker and Number 8.

== Rugby Union career ==
=== Amateur career ===
Marshall played club rugby for Wakefield and Selkirk.

=== Provincial career ===
Marshall played for the Scottish Exiles in the Scottish Inter-District Championship.

=== International career ===
Marshall received two Scotland 'B' caps in the 1987–88 season.

Marshall received two Scotland 'A' caps from 1991 to 1992.

Marshall won four senior full caps for Scotland between 1988 and 1991.

=== Coaching career ===
Whilst at wakefield rfu Mr Marshall was employed as a PE teacher at Darton High School where he began his coaching career

Marshall coached Selkirk High School and Selkirk Youth club. During his time at Selkirk Youth Club he took the team to three successive Youth League Cup finals, winning the title in 2003. Selkirk's promotion to the Scottish Premiership One in 2008 was described as a testament to Graham's coaching abilities, as 15 of his protégés were involved in the squad.

In 2011, Marshall became the coach at Scottish Premier One side, Heriot's Rugby Club in Edinburgh. Graham has also coached the U18 Scottish team.
