= Jonathan Lowe (cricketer) =

English cricketer

Personal information
- Full name: Jonathan Paul Lowe
- Born: 13 November 1977 (age 48); Pontefract, Yorkshire, England
- Batting: Right-handed
- Bowling: Right-arm medium

Domestic team information
- Years: Team
- 1998–2000: Cambridge University

Career statistics
Competition	First-class
Matches	11
Runs scored	20
Batting average	4.00
100s/50s	–/–
Top score	7*
Balls bowled	1,350
Wickets	8
Bowling average	81.75
5 wickets in innings	–
10 wickets in match	–
Best bowling	2/42
Catches/stumpings	1/–
- Source: Cricinfo, 31 December 2021

Jonathan Paul Lowe (born 13 November 1977) is an English former first-class cricketer and British Army officer.

Lowe was born at Pontefract in November 1977. He was educated at the Queen Elizabeth Grammar School in Wakefield, before going up to Girton College, Cambridge. While studying at Cambridge, he played first-class cricket for Cambridge University Cricket Club from 1998 to 2000, making eleven appearances. Playing as a medium pace bowler, he took 8 wickets at an expensive average of 81.75 runs per wicket; his best bowling figures were 2 for 42. After graduating from Cambridge, he attended the Royal Military Academy Sandhurst. He graduated in January 2002, entering into the Army Air Corps as a second lieutenant. He gained promotion to captain in June 2004, before being made a major in July 2009. A further promotion to lieutenant colonel followed in June 2017, with Lowe gaining his Army Long Service and Good Conduct Medal in October 2018.
