= Thomas Doughty (priest) =

Thomas Doughty DD (1636 – 2 December 1701) was a Canon of Windsor from 1673 to 1701.

== Career ==
He was educated at Queen Elizabeth Grammar School, Wakefield and Magdalene College, Cambridge where he graduated BA in 1657, MA in 1660, DD in 1671.

He was appointed:

- Chaplain to the Duke of York
- Vicar of Romsey, Hampshire 1662
- Rector of Bishopstoke 1666–1698
- Rector of Clewer, Berkshire 1680

He was appointed to the seventh stall in St George's Chapel, Windsor Castle in 1673 and held the canonry until 1701.
