= Jack Oakes (cricketer) =

English cricketer

Personal information
- Full name: John Ypres Oakes
- Born: 29 March 1916; Horsham, Sussex, England
- Died: 4 July 1997 (aged 81); Hexham, Northumberland, England
- Batting: Right-handed
- Bowling: Right-arm off-break
- Role: All-rounder
- Relatives: Brother Charles

Domestic team information
- Years: Team
- 1937–1951: Sussex

Career statistics
Competition	First-class
Matches	128
Runs scored	4,410
Batting average	22.16
100s/50s	2/20
Top score	151
Balls bowled	12,615
Wickets	166
Bowling average	39.20
5 wickets in innings	6
10 wickets in match	–
Best bowling	7/64
Catches/stumpings	86/–
- Source: CricketArchive, 11 December 2024

John Ypres Oakes (29 March 1916 – 4 July 1997) was an English cricketer who played for Sussex from 1937 to 1951. He was born in Horsham and died in Hexham. He appeared in 128 first-class matches as a righthanded batsman who bowled off breaks (OB). He scored 4,410 runs with a highest score of 151, one of two centuries, and took 166 wickets with a best performance of seven for 64. Oakes had a long association with club cricket and became a groundsman after he retired as a player, serving for many years at Formica Ltd in Tynemouth, as well as the broader De La Rue group, where Robin Marlar also made his mark. He was the younger brother of Charles Oakes.
