= Reg Bolton (rugby union) =

England international rugby union player

- Born: Reg Bolton; 20 November 1909 Prescott, Gloucestershire, England
- Died: 21 September 2006 (aged 96)

Rugby union career
Senior career
Years	Team	Apps	(Points)
- Wakefield
–	Harlequins		
International career
Years	Team	Apps	(Points)
1933–1938	England	5	(6)

Reginald Bolton (20 November 1909 – 21 September 2006) was an English physician and England International rugby player.

He played five times for England making his debut against Wales in 1933. His final appearance was in 1938.

He played for Wakefield and Harlequins, as well as thirty times for Yorkshire.

He was the son of Professor J Shaw Bolton, the medical Superintendent at the west Riding Mental Hospital in Wakefield and a pupil at QEGS Wakefield.
