= Queen Elizabeth Grammar School, Wakefield =

Public school in Wakefield, West Yorkshire, England

Queen Elizabeth’s School Wakefield

Location
- Wakefield, West Yorkshire, WF1 3QX; England; 53.68844°N 1.50135°W

Information
- Type: Public school
- Motto: Turpe Nescire (Latin: "It is a disgrace to be ignorant")
- Religious affiliation: Church of England
- Established: 1591; 435 years ago
- Founder: Thomas Savile and others
- Department for Education URN: 108306 Tables
- Chairman of the Governors: Martin Shevill
- Headmaster: Richard Brookes
- Gender: Boys and Girls
- Age: 4 to 18
- Enrolment: ≈680
- Colours: Blue, Gold, White
- Former pupils: Old Savilians and Old Girls
- School song: "Floreas, Wakefieldia"
- Website: wgsf.org.uk

Queen Elizabeth’s School Wakefield is a public school (day school, no boarding) for boys and girls in Wakefield, West Yorkshire, England. The school was founded by Royal Charter of Queen Elizabeth I in 1591 at the request of leading citizens in Wakefield (headed by Thomas Savile and his two sons) 75 in total and some of whom formed the first governing body.

The school is part of a foundation, with both QEGS Senior and Junior schools joined together, along with the nearby Wakefield Girls' High School and its Junior School, and Mulberry House, which is a nursery and pre-prep department.

As of September 2021, the headmaster of the school is Dr Richard Brookes, who was previously senior deputy head at City of London School. He has recently announced that he will be assuming the post of High Master at Manchester Grammar School. During the merging period and his remaining time, he is serving as Executive Head.

QES is a member of the Headmasters' and Headmistresses' Conference.

As of 2026, QEGS has merged with Wakefield Girls’ High School and Wakefield Pre Preparatory School to form the new diamond model Queen Elizabeth’s School Wakefield.

== History ==
=== Founding ===
Queen Elizabeth's School dates back to 19 November 1591 when a charter was granted to fourteen men to act as governors of the new school. In 1598, it moved into a purpose-built building, now the Elizabethan Gallery.

The charter read:

Of our especial grace, certain knowledge and mere motion, we do, will grant and ordain for us, our heirs and successors, that hereafter there be and shall be one Grammar School of Queen Elizabeth at Wakefield, for the teaching, instructing and bringing up of children and youth in grammar, and other good learning, to continue to that use forever.

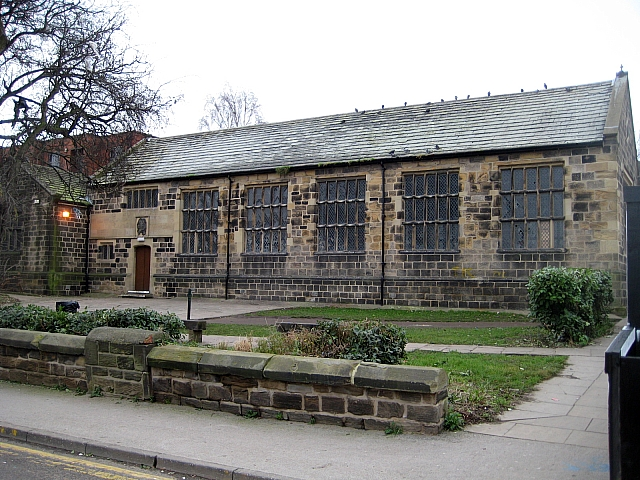
The original Elizabethan school building on Brook Street

Five of the fourteen men designated to be governors bore the name Saville. Generations of the Saville family have played important roles in the school's history and hence the reason why the Old Boys' Association is called the Old Savilians' Club.

=== Coat of arms ===
Coat of arms of Queen Elizabeth Grammar School, Wakefield
Notes The arms have been in use since 1591, but it is unknown if or when they were granted. Crest On a wreath Argent and Azure, an owl Argent. Escutcheon Per fess, in the upper half parted per pale, Gules a lion statant guardant Or, and Sable an owl Argent, the lower half Azure a Bible Argent with clasps Or. Motto 'Turpe Nescire'

The school arms came into existence soon after the school was founded and features a lion, an owl and a Bible. The golden lion on a red field refers to the royal foundation; the silver owl on black is taken from the arms of the Savile family (one of the founding families) and the Bible indicates the religious side of education. The school motto, "Turpe Nescire", means "It is a disgrace to be ignorant".

=== School song ===
Around 1900, H. G. Abel, then the senior classics master, composed "Floreas, Wakefieldia" and Matthew Peacock, headmaster and honorary choirmaster at the cathedral, set the words to music. It was seen as fitting that the song should be written in Latin, thereby evoking echoes of traditional scholasticism. The song is still sung today – at Founders' Day, Speech Day and at all Old Savilian Club dinners.

== Facilities ==
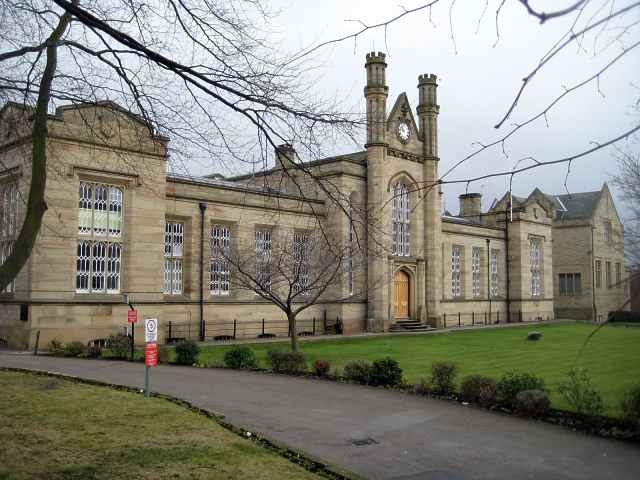
The current buildings on Northgate

In 1854 QEGS moved to its present site in Northgate, Wakefield, into premises designed by the architect Richard Lane and formerly occupied by the West Riding Proprietary School. The attached Junior school for boys aged 7 to 11 was founded in 1910.

The Savile Building was opened in 2005 by Ted Wragg, the educationalist, who had taught at the school in the early 1960s. The new building provides a 6th form centre, English department, theatre, and Learning Resources Centre for the pupils of QEGS.

== Sport ==
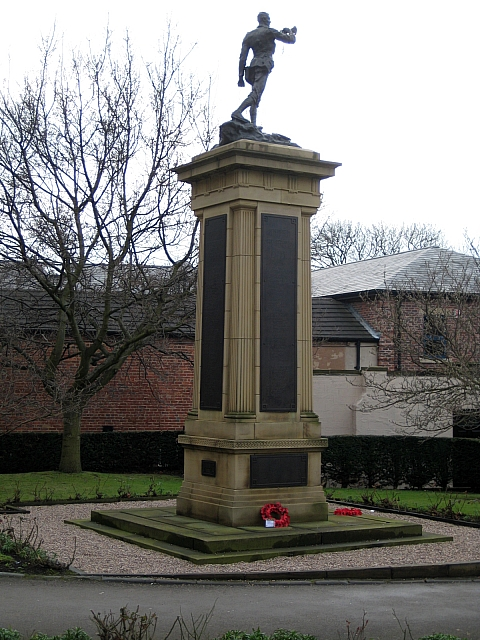
War memorial at Queen Elizabeth Grammar School, Wakefield

The school is often noted for its sporting ability, having achieved frequent success in a number of sports. Over 83% of the school's boys represent QEGS in one sporting event or another. The most popular sport is rugby union, followed by hockey, cricket, athletics, and basketball. Hockey in particular has experienced substantial growth in the school throughout the last decade, and is now close to matching rugby union's dominance internally. In 2006, 2013, 2014 and 2015 the under-15s Rugby side reached the Daily Mail Cup final, winning the 2015 competition in a tight 15–6 win over three time final rivals Warwick. In 2009 every age group won the hockey 'Yorkshire Cup' for the first time in the school's history with the under 16s going on to reach the national semi-finals, only to lose to Whitgift School. As well as plenty of sporting opportunities, the school also gives pupils the opportunity to participate in the Duke of Edinburgh's Award Scheme.

== In popular culture ==
- David Storey's Booker Prize winning novel Saville (1976) includes an account of the experiences of a working class boy at a Yorkshire grammar school in the 1940s. Storey, like the protagonist of Saville a miner's son, is an old boy of QEGS.
- The school is mentioned in the novel Nineteen Seventy-Four by David Peace.

== Headmasters ==
Headmasters of Queen Elizabeth Grammar School, Wakefield from 1591 to the present time.

- 1591–1598 Edward Mawde
- 1600–1607 John Beaumont
- 1607-1607 Jeremy Gibson
- 1607-1607 Robert Saunders
- 1607–1623 Philip Isack
- 1623–1663 Robert Doughty
- 1663–1665 Samuel Garvey
- 1672 Rev Jeremiah Boulton
- 1672–1681 John Baskervile
- 1681–1693 Edward Clarke
- 1693–1703 Edmund Farrer
- 1703–1720 Thomas Clark
- 1720–1751 Benjamin Wilson
- 1751–1758 John Clarke
- 1758–1795 Christopher Atkinson
- 1795–1814 Thomas Rogers
- 1814–1837 Martin Joseph Naylor
- 1837–1847 John Carter
- 1847–1875 James Taylor
- 1875–1883 Robert Leighton Leightoh
- 1883–1910 Matthew Henry Peacock
- 1911–1916 Joseph E. Barton
- 1917–1939 Alfred J. Spilsbury
- 1939–1956 Wilfred A. Grace
- 1956–1964 Ernest J. Baggaley
- 1964–1975 J. K. Dudley
- 1975–1985 James G. Parker
- 1985–2001 Robert Mardling
- 2001–2010 Michael Gibbons
- 2010–2020 David Craig
- 2021–present Richard Brookes

== Notable Old Savilians ==
=== Academia ===
- T.D. Barnes (born 1942), Professor of Classics in the University of Toronto (1976–2007)
- John Barron (1934–2008), classicist and Master of St Peter's College, Oxford
- Stuart Jones, British historian, Professor of Intellectual History at the University of Manchester
- Professor Sir Hans Leo Kornberg (1928-2019), British biochemist and master of Christ's College, Cambridge (1982–1995)
- David May (born 1951), Professor of Computer Science at the University of Bristol, former lead architect of the transputer and Chief Technology Officer and founder of XMOS.
- Joseph Moxon (1627–1691), Mathematician and Hydrographer to King Charles II.
- Benjamin Pulleyne (1785–1861), mathematician, Fellow of Clare College, Cambridge, and headmaster of Gresham's School
- Charles Ross (1924–1986), Professor of Medieval History, Bristol University, and author
- Alan M. Taylor (born 1964), economist, Columbia University, and external member of the Bank of England Monetary Policy Committee.
- John Wolfenden, Baron Wolfenden (1906–1985), Vice Chancellor of the University of Reading, and chair of the Committee on Homosexual Offences and Prostitution, which in 1957 published the Wolfenden Report that recommended the decriminalisation of homosexuality.
- Hector Munro Chadwick (1870–1947), English philologist and historian, fellow of Clare College, Cambridge and professor of Anglo-Saxon at the University of Cambridge (1912–41)
- John Hopkins (1936–2018), Cambridge University academic
- Roger Clifford Carrington (1906–1971), English classical scholar, archaeologist and teacher
- Anand Menon (born 1965), European Politics and Foreign Affairs, King's College London

=== Arts ===
Art

- Thomas Hartley Cromek (1809–1873), English artist

Literature

- Thomas Armstrong (1899–1978), novelist
- Richard Bentley (1662–1742), theologian, classical scholar and critic
- Dusty Hughes (born 1947), English playwright and director
- Robert Munford III (1737–1783), American playwright
- AJ Quinnell (real name Philip Nicholson; 1940–2005), author
- David Storey (1933–2017), playwright and novelist, winner of the Booker Prize in 1976 for Saville

Music

- Andrew Cocup (born 1972), aka Andy Cato from the band Groove Armada
- Noel Gay (1898–1954), composer of popular music
- Kenneth Leighton (1929–1988), classical and Anglican church music composer
- John Scott (1956–2015), choirmaster and organist
- Lukas Wooller, keyboardist with the band Maxïmo Park

=== Criminals ===
- Adam Britton (born 1971), zoologist and zoosadist who sexually abused, tortured and killed around 40 dogs
- Stephen Griffiths (born 1969), serial killer, from Dewsbury, known as the "Crossbow Cannibal"
- John George Haigh (1909–1949), serial killer in England in the 1940s, known as the "Acid Bath Murderer"

=== Miscellaneous ===
- George Allan (1736–1800), English antiquary and lawyer. Co-writer of History and Antiquities of the Country Palatine of Durham.
- Edmund Cartwright (1743–1823), inventor of the power loom
- Sidney Hayward (1896–1961), British barrister and legal writer
- David Hepworth (born 1950), journalist and magazine publisher
- Charles Hoole (1610–1667), English cleric and educational writer
- William Alfred Ismay (1910–2001), librarian, writer and collector
- Nicholas Lavender (born 1964), English Justice of the High Court of England and Wales
- Joseph Hirst Lupton (1836–1905), English schoolmaster, cleric and writer
- Francis Smith (1847–1912), Puisne judge
- Sir Frank Standish, 3rd Baronet (1746–1812)
- Thomas Zouch (1737–1815), clergyman and antiquary

=== Politics ===
- Jonathan Baume (born 1953), trade unionist
- Samuel Gledhill (1677-1735/1736, lieutenant-governor of Placentia, Newfoundland (1719-c.1730)
- Tony Greaves (1942–2021), Liberal Democrat member of the House of Lords
- William J. Howard (1799–1862), American-born politician and Free Trade activist
- Richard Henry Lee (1732–1794), signer of the United States Declaration of Independence and US Senator
- Frank Marshall, Baron Marshall of Leeds (1915–1990), British lawyer, politician, and member of the House of Lords
- Sir Francis Molyneux, 7th Baronet (1765–1812), Gentleman Usher of the Black Rod
- Bertram Lamb Pearson (1893–1984), senior British civil servant
- Edward Thompson, Member of Parliament for York and later the Commissioner of the Admiralty
- Henry Zouch (c. 1725–1795), English antiquary and social reformer

=== Religion ===
- Thomas Adam (1701–1784), Church of England clergyman and religious writer
- John Ashton (1866–1964), Anglican Bishop of Grafton
- James Bardsley (1805–1886), English cleric and honorary canon of Manchester Cathedral
- Joseph Bingham (1668–1723), English scholar and divine
- Daniel Cresswell (1776–1844), English divine and mathematician
- Hugh Paulinus de Cressy (c.1605–1674), English Benedictine monk
- Rev Jack Cunningham (1926–1978), inaugural Anglican Bishop of Central Zambia
- John Disney (1746–1816), Unitarian Minister
- Thomas Doughty (1636–1701), Canon of Windsor
- John Duncan (born 1933), Archdeacon of Birmingham
- Robert Maynard Hardy (1936–2021), Anglican Bishop
- David Hope, Baron Hope of Thornes (born 1940), former archbishop of York
- Barnabas Oley (1602–1686), English churchman and academic
- John Potter (1674–1747), Archbishop of Canterbury
- Jeremiah Whitaker (1599–1654), English Puritan clergyman
- Rev Arnold Lomas Wylde (1880–1958), Bishop of Bathurst during the mid 20th century

=== Science and medicine ===
- Andy Harter (born 1961), British computer scientist
- Herbert Haslegrave (1902–1999), British engineer
- Julian Norton (born 1972), British surgeon, author and TV personality
- John Radcliffe (1652–1714), British physician
- William Sharp (1805–1896), English surgeon and physician.
- Robert Smith (1840–1885), Assistant Colonial Surgeon of Sierra Leone

=== Sport ===
- Reg Bolton (1909–2006), rugby union footballer who played in the 1930s for England, Yorkshire, Wakefield and Harlequins
- Gordon Bonner (1907–1985), British and Irish Lions rugby union footballer who toured New Zealand and Australia in 1930
- Geoffrey Clarkson (1943–2001), English rugby union and rugby league player in the 1960s, 1970s, and 1980s
- Matt Crooks (born 1994), English footballer currently playing for Hull City in the EFL Championship
- Harry Duke (born 2001), English cricketer
- Martin Dyson (1935–2019), English cricketer and schoolmaster who played first-class cricket for Oxford University (1958–1960)
- Jack Ellis (1912–2007), English rugby union player
- Andy Forsyth (born 1990), rugby union player who currently plays for Coventry R.F.C. in the RFU Championship
- William Guest (1903–1991), rugby union footballer who played in the 1920s and 1930s for Yorkshire, South Elmsall and Wakefield
- Mike Harrison (born 1956), former captain England national rugby union team
- Phillip Hodson (born 1951), cricketer and former president of the Marylebone Cricket Club
- Jonathan Lowe (born 1977), cricketer
- Alister MacKenzie (1870–1934), British golf course designer known for designing Augusta National Golf Club
- Roger Pearman (born 1939), rugby union, and rugby league footballer who played in the 1960s for Sandal, Headingley, Loughborough University, Wakefield Trinity and Canterbury-Bankstown, and coached in the 1960s for Canterbury-Bankstown
- Adam Pearson (born 1964), current Hull City chairman, former commercial director of Leeds United football club and former chairman of Derby County
- Roy Pollard (1927–2012), rugby league footballer
- Ronald Rylance (1924–1998), World Cup winning rugby league footballer who played in the 1940s and 1950s, for England, Yorkshire, Wakefield Trinity, Dewsbury and Huddersfield
- Mike Smith (born 1967), England and Gloucestershire cricketer
- Mike Tindall (born 1978), Rugby Union World Cup winning rugby union player, ex-England captain
- Frank Williams (1910–1959), Welsh rugby union player
- Greg Wood (born 1988), former England U19 cricket captain
- Ben Woods (born 1982), flanker for Newcastle Falcons and England Saxons rugby union

== See also ==
- Listed buildings in Wakefield
