= Nick Lloyd (rugby union) =

England international rugby union player

- Born: Nick Lloyd; 12 October 1976 (age 50) London, England
- Height: 1.83 m (6 ft 0 in)
- Weight: 106 kg (16 st 10 lb)
- School: Dulwich College

Rugby union career
- Position: Prop
Youth career
- Old Alleynians
Senior career
Years	Team	Apps	(Points)
2000–04	Wakefield		
2004–	Rotherham Titans		
–	Saracens		
International career
Years	Team	Apps	(Points)
2008–	England Rugby		

Nick Lloyd (born 12 October 1976) was a professional rugby union player.

He was educated at Dulwich College. He was selected for the Scottish squad for the 2004–05 qualifying through his paternal grandmother from Aberdeen after earlier appearances in the Scottish Exiles squad,

Nick made his England representative debut for the England Saxons in the opening match of the 2008 Churchill Cup against the USA before injury shortened his tour.

He played for England in their (non cap) game against the Barbarians in June 2008.

His former clubs include Old Alleynians, Wakefield, Rotherham and Saracens. He was released by Saracens at the end of the 2008–09 season.

He was the Director of Rugby and at Akeley Wood School in Buckinghamshire from the summer of 2010 to December 2012. During his tenure, he implemented a game plan modelled on a Southern Hemisphere style of play which featured aspects of all out attack and rush defence which culminated in a famous 12–10 victory against the Royal Latin in 2011.
