= Ian Greig =

English cricketer (born 1955)

Personal information
- Full name: Ian Alexander Greig
- Born: 8 December 1955 (age 70); Queenstown, Union of South Africa
- Batting: Right-handed
- Bowling: Right-arm medium

International information
- National side: England
- Test debut: 29 July 1982 v Pakistan
- Last Test: 12 August 1982 v Pakistan

Career statistics
Competition	Test	FC	LA
Matches	2	253	235
Runs scored	26	8,301	3,136
Batting average	6.50	28.72	20.10
100s/50s	0/0	8/40	0/6
Top score	14	291	82
Balls bowled	188	25,065	7,993
Wickets	4	419	212
Bowling average	28.50	31.08	28.08
5 wickets in innings	0	10	3
10 wickets in match	0	2	0
Best bowling	4/53	7/43	5/30
Catches/stumpings	0/–	152/–	55/–
- Source: ESPNcricinfo, 7 November 2022

Ian Alexander Greig (born 8 December 1955) is a former professional cricketer, who played in two tests for England in 1982. He is the younger brother of former England captain and cricket commentator Tony Greig and the uncle of Durham UCCE player Will Hodson.

== Early life and education ==
Greig was born in Queenstown, Eastern Cape, South Africa. He was educated at George Watson's College, Edinburgh, Queen's College, Queenstown, and Downing College, Cambridge. Although a South African, Greig was allowed to play for England because his father was Scottish.

Whilst at Cambridge, Greig played both rugby union and cricket. He represented Cambridge in the Varsity Match in 1977 and 1978, and won blues for cricket in 1977, 1978 and 1979.

== Cricket career ==
Greig played one-day cricket as an all rounder for Sussex County Cricket Club in 1979 before making his first-class debut for the team in 1980. His career with Sussex lasted until 1985. His most successful season for Sussex was in 1981, when he scored 911 runs (average 30.36), and took 76 wickets at 19.32. In 1982, the English selectors chose him as a replacement for the injured Derek Pringle to face Pakistan in two test matches.

Sussex released Greig, and others, in 1985 as part of cost-cutting measures, and he emigrated to Australia. However, he joined Surrey County Cricket Club, and captained the team between 1987 and 1991. Greig's highest score of 291 came in 1990 in a total of 707 at The Oval; Lancashire replied with 863, Neil Fairbrother top-scoring with 366, the highest-ever score at The Oval.

== Later life ==
Greig's current position is coach of the 1st XI team at the Anglican Church Grammar School in Brisbane, Australia.
