= Epilepsy Action Australia =

Australian charity

Epilepsy Action Australia is an Australian charity providing education and support services to children and adults in Australia with epilepsy and other seizure disorders. The group is made up of caseworkers, registered nurses and other service providers, and aims to meet individuals' social, emotional and seizure management needs, with information, referral services and consultancy for professional organisations.

Until 2005, the group was called the Epilepsy Association of Australia.
