= Jack Ellis (rugby union) =

England international rugby union player

- Born: Jack Ellis; 23 October 1912 Rothwell, West Yorkshire, England
- Died: 27 November 2007 (aged 95) Northampton, England

Rugby union career
- Position: Scrum-half
Senior career
Years	Team	Apps	(Points)
- Wakefield RFC.
–	Yorkshire		
–	Barbarian F.C.		
International career
Years	Team	Apps	(Points)
1939	England	1	(0)

Jack Ellis (23 October 1912 – 27 November 2007) was an England international rugby union player. At the time of his death it was reported that he was the oldest living England international rugby player, although it was later discovered this was incorrect.

== Rugby career ==
He played in only one official England game a 9–6 win against Scotland during the 1938/39 season. Official international games were not played during the Second World War but he played in 10 Red Cross Service Internationals including a joint England/Wales team that beat a joint Scotland/Ireland team 17–3 in December 1939.

He also played five times for the Barbarians and Yorkshire.

At club level he played for Wakefield RFC making his debut during the 1931/32 season, playing 106 games and scoring 37 tries.

== Career ==
He qualified in classics at Durham in 1936, also acquiring a Diploma in Physical Education at Carnegie College.

He was a school teacher and he taught classics, Latin and Greek at Fettes in Edinburgh, Rossall in Lancashire and Scarborough High School for Boys .

He was a major in the Royal Army Service Corps during the Second World War, being amongst the British troops who liberated Belsen in 1945.
