= Nat Saumi =

Fijian rugby union player

- Born: Nacenieli Saumi; 3 September 1970 (age 56) Nadroga, Fiji
- Height: 1.78 m (5 ft 10 in)
- Weight: 100 kg (15 st 10 lb; 220 lb)
- School: Ratu Kadavulevu School, Lodoni

Rugby union career
- Position(s): Fly-half, Centre, Full back
Senior career
Years	Team	Apps	(Points)
1996–98	Redruth		
1998–03	Penzance & Newlyn	123	
2003–09, 2010–11	Plymouth Albion	107	(209)
- Correct as of 13 March 2011
International career
Years	Team	Apps	(Points)
1995	Fiji Sevens		

Nat Saumi (born 1970), real name Nacenieli, is a retired Fijian rugby union player who is currently a coach. A versatile back, Nat could play at fly-half, centre or full back. Despite having offers to play Premiership rugby, Nat spent his career in England playing for south-west clubs, most notably with Penzance & Newlyn (now known as Cornish Pirates) and Plymouth, whom he also coached. An outstanding points scorer both in terms of kicking and tries, Nat became one of the most prolific points scorers of all-time in National League 2 South with over 700 points, including a divisional record of 374 points in a season, achieved in 2001 while playing for Penzance-Newlyn. As well as playing club rugby, Nat has also represented Fiji Sevens, Barbarians and Cornwall with whom he won the Bill Beaumont Cup back in 1999.

== Career ==
=== Redruth and Pirates ===
In 1996 after a spell representing international sevens for his country Fiji, Nat moved to England to play for Redruth, then competing in tier 3 of the English rugby union system. After a couple of seasons at Redruth, who would be relegated in this time, he would drop a division to play for local rivals, Penzance & Newlyn (now known as the Cornish Pirates), winning South West Division 1 in his first season and gaining promotion to tier 4 as well as winning the Cornwall Cup. While Redruth had been traditionally seen as Cornwall's top club, they were on the decline, as would become evident the next season, when Penzance & Newlyn became the highest ranked Cornish club in the English league system with a 2nd-placed finish, just missing out on a second successive promotion (Redruth finished in 5th place). Nat's form with his club side (which included winning a successive Cornwall Cup) would see him called up by Cornwall for the County Championships in 1999. In front of a crowd of 25,000 at the final at Twickenham Stadium, Nat played a key role, taking over kicking duties in the latter stages of the game and scoring a number of points, including the final conversion, in a 24–15 victory against Gloucestershire, in what would be Cornwall's first victory in the competition since 1991.

The 2000–01 season saw Penzance & Newlyn miss out on promotion again, finishing 3rd outside of the promotion play-off spot, which was occupied by fellow Cornish side, Launceston. Despite the disappointment of missing out on promotion, Nat had an outstanding scoring season with 352 points from just 23 games, including 17 tries, ensuring that he finished as the division's top scorer. The next season was arguably the best of Nat's league career as he scored a divisional record breaking 374 points from 24 games, as Penzance & Newlyn won the National Division Three South title, just 1 point ahead of rivals Launceston (who had failed to win their promotion game the last season). By winning National Division Three South and promotion to National Division Two, his club side would reach the highest level in their league history. The next year promoted Penzance & Newlyn side took National Two by storm as they won 22 out of 26 games to finish as league champions and achieve their 3rd promotion in 5 years, to reach the giddy heights of tier 2 – just one below the Premiership. However, despite scoring a respectable 234 points from 22 games (the fourth highest in the division), Nat would not witness this promotion as a training ground incident, in which a team-mates jaw was broken, saw him sacked by his club in April 2003.

=== Plymouth Albion ===
In 2003 after leaving Penzance & Newlyn, Nat was signed by Graham Dawe at Plymouth Albion, who like his previous club were in National Division One and were an ambitious south-west side that had climbed the divisions. His first year at the club was relatively success as Albion finished 3rd in the league, some way off league champions Worcester Warriors who won all their games. Although he made 20 appearances for Albion in all competitions, he did not enjoy the prolific point's scoring he had during his time with Penzance & Newlyn, as team-mate Tom Barlow was the main kicker. The 2004–05 season was another good one for Nat, as he was a regular in a side that once again finished 3rd in the league, 11 points behind champions, Bristol Shoguns. He also played in the final of the Powergen Shield – the first time Plymouth had ever played at Twickenham Stadium – which his side lost by the finest of margins, 13–14 to winners Bedford Blues.

The 2005–06 saw Nat return to kicking duties as he scored 106 points in the league as Plymouth finished 5th in what was an increasingly competitive division including strong teams such as Harlequins, Bedford Blues, the Cornish Pirates and Exeter Chiefs. In April 2006 Nat would receive the honour of being called up by the Barbarians for their game against the Royal Navy, featuring in a 31–10 victory for the Baa-Baas, at the game held at Albion's Brickfields. As he approached the last couple of seasons with Albion, Nat would increasingly mix playing with coaching.

=== Coaching ===
After a brief spell in Fiji, Nat returned to Plymouth Albion as a player-coach, continuing to work with mentor Graham Dawe. Albion had been on the wane for a number of seasons and by November 2011 the club had sacked Graham Dawe. Dawe's replacement, Pete Drewsett, then left in January 2012 due to the club's financial problems, and Nat was offered the position of head coach. In his first season in charge, Nat ensured that Plymouth did just enough to avoid relegation by finishing second in the relegation group, with Esher going down instead. Targeting a top 8 position for the 2012–13 season, Nat just missed out on his promise as his side finished 9th, well clear of the single relegation place. Despite steering Albion to safety, Nat would leave the club at the end of the season to return home to Fiji. It was the end of an incredible English adventure for Nat who had played and coached in the south-west of England for 17 years. He currently lives in Fiji where he is a rugby coach and consultant.

== Season-by-season playing stats ==
Season	Club	Competition	Appearances	Tries	Drop goals	Conversions	Penalties	Total points
1996–97	Redruth	Courage National 3	?	?	?	?	?	?
1997–98	Redruth	Jewson National Division 2 South	?	?	?	?	?	?
1998–99	Penzance & Newlyn	South West Division 1	20	?	?	?	?	?
1999–00	Penzance & Newlyn	National Division 3 South	16	11	0	55	13	204
2000–01	Penzance & Newlyn	National Division 3 South	23	17	0	67	39	352
2001–02	Penzance & Newlyn	National Division 3 South	22 + 2	15	0	91	39	374
2001–02	Penzance & Newlyn	Powergen Cup	2	0	0	12	2	30
2002–03	Penzance & Newlyn	National Division 2	18	10	0	44	32	234
2002–03	Penzance & Newlyn	Powergen Cup	1	1	0	0	2	11
2003–04	Plymouth Albion	National Division 1	18	1	0	3	3	20
2003–04	Plymouth Albion	Powergen Cup	2	0	0	7	0	14
2004–05	Plymouth Albion	National Division 1	22	3	0	0	1	18
2004–05	Plymouth Albion	Powergen Cup	1	0	0	0	0	0
2004–05	Plymouth Albion	Powergen Shield	1	0	0	0	0	0
2005–06	Plymouth Albion	National Division 1	17	2	0	15	22	106
2005–06	Plymouth Albion	EDF Energy Trophy	2	1	0	2	4	21
2006–07	Plymouth Albion	National Division 1	25	3	0	0	0	15
2006–07	Plymouth Albion	EDF Energy Trophy	4	0	0	0	0	0
2007–08	Plymouth Albion	National Division 1	11	1	0	0	0	5
2007–08	Plymouth Albion	EDF Energy Trophy	4	1	0	0	0	5
2008–09	Plymouth Albion	National Division 1	6	0	0	0	0	0
2010–11	Plymouth Albion	RFU Championship	0	0	0	0	0	0

== Honours and records ==
Penzance & Newlyn

- South West Division 1 champions: 1998–99
- Cornwall Cup winners (2): 1998–99, 1999–00
- National Division 3 South champions: 2001–02
- National Division 3 South top point scorer (2): 2000–01 (352 points), 2001–02 (374 points)
- National League 2 South most points for a season (374 points): 2001–02

Plymouth Albion

- Powergen Shield runner-up: 2005

Cornwall

- Bill Beaumont Cup winners: 1999

International/Representative

- Barbarians: 2006
