= 2002–03 National Division Two =

Rugby union competition in England

- Countries: England
- Champions: Penzance & Newlyn
- Runners-up: Henley Hawks (also promoted)
- Relegated: Fylde, Kendal, Launceston
- Attendance: 80,093 (average 480 per match) (Note: Note that 15 home attendances are missing (see below) - so the total attendance will not be 100% accurate. The average attendance has also been taken into account with the missing games not included.)
- Highest attendance: 2,200 Penzance & Newlyn at home to Henley Hawks on 18 January 2003
- Lowest attendance: 120 (x2) Bracknell against Nottingham 8 March 2003 & Sedgley Park on 15 March 2003
- Top point scorer: (England) Barry Reeves; Henley Hawks 327 points
- Top try scorer: (England) Nnamdi Obi; Henley Hawks 20 tries

The 2002–03 National Division Two was the third version (sixteenth overall) of the third division of the English domestic rugby union competition using the name National Division Two. New teams to the division included Henley Hawks and Bracknell who were relegated from the 2001–02 National Division One while promoted teams included Doncaster who were champions of the 2001–02 National Division Three North as well as Cornish teams Penzance & Newlyn (champions) and Launceston (playoffs) who came up from the 2001–02 National Division Three South. The league points system was 2 points for a win and 1 point for a draw.

Penzance & Newlyn finished the season as champions with Henley Hawks six points behind as runners up, both sides being convincingly the best in the division and would be promoted to the 2003–04 National Division One for the next season. For Penzance & Newlyn it was their second successive promotion while Henley made an instant return having been relegated the following season. Fylde and Kendal were the first two sides to be relegated but the battle for the last relegation spot was very tight with just three points separating 12th from 8th in the division. Launceston went into their last game ahead of relegation rivals Nottingham and Wharfedale, but while those sides won their games, Launceston lost their home game against league champions and local rivals Penzance & Newlyn to condemn the Polson Bridge side to the drop – dead level with Nottingham but with a worse points difference. Fylde and Kendal would drop to the 2003–04 National Division Three North while Launceston returned to the 2003–04 National Division Three South.

== Participating teams and locations ==
Locations of the 2002-03 National Division Two teams

Team	Stadium	Capacity	City/Area
Bracknell	Lily Hill Park	1,250 (250 seats)	Bracknell, Berkshire
Doncaster	Castle Park	3,075	Doncaster, South Yorkshire
Esher	Molesey Road	3,000	Hersham, Surrey
Fylde	Woodlands Memorial Ground	7,500 (500 seats)	Lytham St. Annes, Lancashire
Harrogate	Claro Road	4,500 (500 seats)	Harrogate, North Yorkshire
Henley Hawks	Dry Leas	4,000	Henley-on-Thames, Oxfordshire
Kendal	Mint Bridge	4,600 (600 seats)	Kendal, Cumbria
Launceston	Polson Bridge	3,000	Launceston, Cornwall
Newbury Blues	Monk's Lane	8,000	Newbury, Berkshire
Nottingham	Ireland Avenue	4,990 (590 seats)	Beeston, Nottinghamshire
Penzance & Newlyn	Mennaye Field	3,500	Penzance, Cornwall
Sedgley Park	Park Lane	3,000	Whitefield, Greater Manchester
Stourbridge	Stourton Park	3,500 (499 seats) (Note: Further upgrades to Stourton Park saw the 450 seater stand expanded to 499 seats.)	Stourbridge, West Midlands
Wharfedale	The Avenue	2,000	Threshfield, Craven, North Yorkshire

== Final league table ==
2002–03 National Division Two table
Pos	Team	Pld	W	D	L	PF	PA	PD	Pts	Qualification
1	Penzance & Newlyn (C, P)	26	22	1	3	849	442	+407	45	Promoted
2	Henley Hawks (P)	26	19	1	6	782	473	+309	39	Promoted
3	Esher	26	16	1	9	700	550	+150	33	
4	Harrogate	26	16	0	10	606	496	+110	32	
5	Bracknell	26	16	0	10	597	525	+72	32	
6	Sedgley Park	26	15	0	11	702	572	+130	30	
7	Doncaster	26	14	0	12	630	551	+79	28	
8	Stourbridge	26	11	1	14	628	783	−155	23	
9	Newbury Blues	26	11	0	15	491	618	−127	22	
10	Wharfedale	26	10	1	15	517	579	−62	21	
11	Nottingham	26	10	0	16	530	629	−99	20	
12	Launceston (R)	26	10	0	16	540	643	−103	20	Relegated
13	Kendal (R)	26	6	1	19	446	840	−394	13	Relegated
14	Fylde (R)	26	3	0	23	457	774	−317	6	Relegated

Updated to match(es) played on 26-04-2003. Source: englandrugby.com
(C) Champions; (P) Promoted; (R) Relegated

== Results ==
=== Round 1 ===
31 August 2002

Bracknell	16 - 9	Launceston
	Report

Lily Hill Park
Attendance: 350
Referee: Alan Biggs

31 August 2002

Doncaster	33 - 15	Stourbridge
	Report

Castle Park
Attendance: 600
Referee: Bruce Robertson

31 August 2002

Henley Hawks	36 - 26	Esher
	Report

Dry Leas
Attendance: 400
Referee: Nick Williams

31 August 2002

Kendal	20 - 34	Harrogate
	Report

Mint Bridge
Attendance: 483
Referee: Richard Parker-Sedgmore

31 August 2002

Nottingham	33 - 22	Newbury Blues
	Report

Ireland Avenue
Attendance: 280
Referee: Chris Sharp

31 August 2002

Penzance & Newlyn	46 - 7	Fylde
	Report

Mennaye Fields
Attendance: 1,500
Referee: Paul Dix

31 August 2002

Wharfedale	14 - 38	Sedgley Park
	Report

The Avenue
Attendance: 500
Referee: Sean Davey

=== Round 2 ===
7 September 2002

Esher	26 - 31	Penzance & Newlyn
	Report

Molesey Road
Attendance: 450
Referee: David Sainsbury

7 September 2002

Harrogate	49 - 12	Doncaster
	Report

Claro Road
Attendance: 750
Referee: Wayne Barnes

7 September 2002

Kendal	0 - 21	Wharfedale

Mint Bridge
Attendance: 350

7 September 2002

Launceston	46 - 7	Fylde
	Report

Polson Bridge
Attendance: 350
Referee: Nick Williams

7 September 2002

Newbury Blues	8 - 37	Bracknell
	Report

Monk's Lane
Attendance: 720
Referee: Richard Parker-Sedgmore

7 September 2002

Sedgley Park	11 - 13	Nottingham
	Report

Park Lane
Referee: D Edmunds

7 September 2002

Stourbridge	20 - 52	Henley Hawks
	Report

Stourton Park
Attendance: 350

=== Round 3 ===
14 September 2002

Bracknell	31 - 12	Stourbridge
	Report

Lily Hill Park
Attendance: 300
Referee: Nigel Higginson

14 September 2002

Doncaster	18 - 49	Wharfedale
	Report

Castle Park
Attendance: 500
Referee: Graham Hughes

14 September 2002

Fylde	20 - 21	Esher
	Report

Woodlands Memorial Ground
Attendance: 350
Referee: Bruce Robertson

14 September 2002

Henley Hawks	39 - 12	Sedgley Park
	Report

Dry Leas
Attendance: 350
Referee: Richard Parker-Sedgmore

14 September 2002

Launceston	28 - 32	Kendal
	Report

Polson Bridge
Attendance: 350
Referee: Paul Dix

14 September 2002

Nottingham	6 - 22	Harrogate
	Report

Ireland Avenue
Attendance: 360
Referee: Alan Hughes

14 September 2002

Penzance & Newlyn	35 - 19	Newbury Blues
	Report

Mennaye Field
Attendance: 1,500
Referee: Andrew Pearce

=== Round 4 ===
21 September 2002

Esher	41 - 23	Launceston
	Report

Molesey Road
Attendance: 400
Referee: Martin Fox

21 September 2002

Harrogate	21 - 42	Henley Hawks
	Report

Claro Road
Attendance: 510
Referee: Graham Hughes

21 September 2002

Kendal	23 - 35	Doncaster
	Report

Mint Bridge
Attendance: 264
Referee: Chris Sharp

21 September 2002

Newbury Blues	11 - 8	Fylde
	Report

Monk's Lane
Attendance: 375
Referee: Tim Beddow

21 September 2002

Sedgley Park	17 - 16	Bracknell
	Report

Park Lane
Referee: Nick Williams

21 September 2002

Stourbridge	22 - 24	Penzance & Newlyn
	Report

Stourton Park
Attendance: 350
Referee: Tim Wigglesworth

21 September 2002

Wharfedale	30 - 12	Nottingham
	Report

The Avenue
Attendance: 400

=== Round 5 ===
28 September 2002

Bracknell	28 - 25	Harrogate
	Report

Lily Hill Park
Attendance: 250
Referee: D Edmunds

28 September 2002

Esher	36 - 34	Kendal
	Report

Molesey Road
Attendance: 500
Referee: Richard Parker-Sedgmore

28 September 2002

Fylde	40 - 24	Stourbridge
	Report

Woodlands Memorial Ground
Attendance: 300
Referee: Chris Sharp

28 September 2002

Henley Hawks	48 - 3	Wharfedale
	Report

Dry Leas
Attendance: 485
Referee: Alan Biggs

28 September 2002

Launceston	36 - 7	Newbury Blues
	Report

Polson Bridge
Attendance: 300
Referee: Nick Williams

28 September 2002

Nottingham	35 - 19	Doncaster
	Report

Ireland Avenue
Attendance: 575

28 September 2002

Penzance & Newlyn	42 - 16	Sedgley Park
	Report

Mennaye Field
Referee: Andrew Pearce

=== Round 6 ===
12 October 2002

Doncaster	11 - 20	Henley Hawks
	Report

Castle Park
Attendance: 600
Referee: Tim Beddow

12 October 2002

Harrogate	31 - 29	Penzance & Newlyn
	Report

Claro Road
Attendance: 604
Referee: Nick Williams

12 October 2002

Kendal	35 - 31	Nottingham
	Report

Mint Bridge
Attendance: 391

12 October 2002

Newbury Blues	9 - 8	Esher
	Report

Monk's Lane
Attendance: 485
Referee: Alan Biggs

12 October 2002

Sedgley Park	53 - 28	Fylde
	Report

Park Lane
Referee: Eric Woodmason

12 October 2002

Stourbridge	28 - 32	Launceston
	Report

Stourton Park
Attendance: 200
Referee: Rowan Kitt

12 October 2002

Wharfedale	3 - 17	Bracknell
	Report

The Avenue
Attendance: 400
Referee: Alan Hughes

=== Round 7 ===
26 October 2002

Bracknell	33 - 14	Doncaster
	Report

Lily Hill Park
Attendance: 200
Referee: Richard Parker-Sedgmore

26 October 2002

Esher	31 - 20	Stourbridge
	Report

Molesey Road
Attendance: 300
Referee: Bruce Robertson

26 October 2002

Fylde	6 - 18	Harrogate
	Report

Woodlands Memorial Ground
Referee: D Edmunds

26 October 2002

Henley Hawks	10 - 20	Nottingham
	Report

Dry Leas
Attendance: 480
Referee: Tim Beddow

26 October 2002

Launceston	30 - 33	Sedgley Park
	Report

Polson Bridge
Attendance: 250
Referee: Eric Woodmason

26 October 2002

Newbury Blues	54 - 9	Kendal
	Report

Monk's Lane
Attendance: 415
Referee: Paul Dix

26 October 2002

Penzance & Newlyn	34 - 34	Wharfedale
	Report

Mennaye Field
Referee: Steve Harland

=== Round 8 ===
2 November 2002

Doncaster	9 - 5	Penzance & Newlyn
	Report

Castle Park
Attendance: 650
Referee: Tim Beddow

2 November 2002

Harrogate	34 - 11	Launceston
	Report

Claro Road
Attendance: 476
Referee: Graham Hughes

2 November 2002

Kendal	9 - 16	Henley Hawks
	Report

Mint Bridge
Attendance: 421
Referee: Alan Hughes

2 November 2002

Nottingham	21 - 14	Bracknell
	Report

Ireland Avenue
Attendance: 365
Referee: D Edmunds

2 November 2002

Sedgley Park	11 - 26	Esher
	Report

Park Lane
Attendance: 250
Referee: Chris Sharp

2 November 2002

Stourbridge	9 - 15	Newbury Blues
	Report

Stourton Park
Attendance: 300
Referee: Tim Wigglesworth

2 November 2002

Wharfedale	19 - 18	Fylde
	Report

The Avenue
Attendance: 400
Referee: Chris Seeley

=== Round 9 ===
16 November 2002

Bracknell	46 - 26	Henley Hawks
	Report

Lily Hill Park
Attendance: 310
Referee: David Sainsbury

16 November 2002

Esher	19 - 7	Harrogate
	Report

Molesey Road
Attendance: 250
Referee: Tim Beddow

16 November 2002

Fylde	25 - 31	Doncaster
	Report

Woodlands Memorial Ground
Attendance: 300
Referee: Nick Williams

16 November 2002

Launceston	30 - 14	Newbury Blues
	Report

Polson Bridge
Attendance: 300
Referee: Steve Harland

16 November 2002

Newbury Blues	28 - 40	Sedgley Park
	Report

Monk's Lane
Attendance: 455
Referee: Rowan Kitt

16 November 2002

Penzance & Newlyn	24 - 19	Nottingham
	Report

Mennaye Field
Attendance: 1,100

16 November 2002

Stourbridge	28 - 13	Kendal
	Report

Stourton Park
Attendance: 200
Referee: Paul Dix

=== Round 10 ===
23 November 2002

Doncaster	40 - 7	Launceston
	Report

Castle Park
Attendance: 650
Referee: S Makinson

23 November 2002

Harrogate	16 - 13	Newbury Blues
	Report

Claro Road
Attendance: 310
Referee: Andrew Canning

23 November 2002

Henley Hawks	16 - 12	Penzance & Newlyn
	Report

Dry Leas
Attendance: 600
Referee: Tim Wigglesworth

23 November 2002

Kendal	12 - 29	Bracknell
	Report

Mint Bridge
Attendance: 220
Referee: Chris Sharp

23 November 2002

Nottingham	21 - 20	Fylde
	Report

Ireland Avenue
Attendance: 230
Referee: Graham Hughes

23 November 2002

Sedgley Park	30 - 14	Stourbridge
	Report

Park Lane
Attendance: 300
Referee: D Edmunds

23 November 2002

Wharfedale	12 - 26	Esher
	Report

The Avenue
Attendance: 350
Referee: Graham Hughes

=== Round 11 ===
30 November 2002

Esher	10 - 6	Doncaster
	Report

Molesey Road
Attendance: 500
Referee: Nick Cousins

30 November 2002

Fylde	20 - 21	Henley Hawks
	Report

Woodlands Memorial Ground
Attendance: 300
Referee: Alan Biggs

30 November 2002

Launceston	15 - 13	Nottingham
	Report

Polson Bridge
Attendance: 250
Referee: Tim Beddow

30 November 2002

Newbury Blues	23 - 13	Wharfedale
	Report

Monk's Lane
Attendance: 385
Referee: Steve Harland

30 November 2002

Penzance & Newlyn	32 - 22	Bracknell
	Report

Mennaye Field
Attendance: 1,000
Referee: Paul Dix

30 November 2002

Sedgley Park	29 - 0	Kendal
	Report

Park Lane
Attendance: 750
Referee: Llyr Apgeraint-Roberts

30 November 2002

Stourbridge	27 - 25	Harrogate
	Report

Stourton Park
Attendance: 250
Referee: Andrew Pearce

=== Round 12 ===
7 December 2002

Bracknell	28 - 24	Fylde
	Report

Lily Hill Park
Attendance: 275
Referee: David Sainsbury

7 December 2002

Doncaster	20 - 11	Newbury Blues
	Report

Castle Park
Attendance: 650
Referee: Nick Williams

7 December 2002

Harrogate	29 - 3	Sedgley Park
	Report

Claro Road
Attendance: 465
Referee: Mark Wilson

7 December 2002

Henley Hawks	43 - 13	Launceston
	Report

Dry Leas
Attendance: 390

7 December 2002

Kendal	12 - 54	Penzance & Newlyn
	Report

Mint Bridge
Attendance: 259
Referee: Alan Hughes

7 December 2002

Nottingham	5 - 29	Esher
	Report

Ireland Avenue
Attendance: 340
Referee: Rowan Kitt

7 December 2002

Wharfedale	11 - 25	Stourbridge
	Report

The Avenue
Attendance: 350
Referee: Dean Richards

=== Round 13 ===
14 December 2002

Esher	26 - 26	Henley Hawks
	Report

Molesey Road
Attendance: 400
Referee: Tim Beddow

14 December 2002

Fylde	15 - 33	Penzance & Newlyn
	Report

Woodlands Memorial Ground
Attendance: 250
Referee: Graham Hughes

14 December 2002

Harrogate	52 - 10	Kendal
	Report

Claro Road
Attendance: 420
Referee: D Edmunds

14 December 2002

Launceston	30 - 21	Bracknell
	Report

Polson Bridge
Attendance: 350
Referee: Nick Williams

14 December 2002

Newbury Blues	28 - 20	Nottingham
	Report

Monk's Lane
Attendance: 300
Referee: Bruce Robertson

14 December 2002

Sedgley Park	22 - 6	Wharfedale
	Report

Park Lane
Attendance: 580
Referee: Rowan Kitt

14 December 2002

Stourbridge	26 - 25	Doncaster
	Report

Stourton Park
Attendance: 300
Referee: Chris Sharp

=== Round 14 ===
21 December 2002

Bracknell	19 - 6	Esher
	Report

Lily Hill Park
Attendance: 200
Referee: Alan Biggs

21 December 2002

Doncaster	30 - 35	Sedgley Park
	Report

Castle Park
Attendance: 800
Referee: D Edmunds

21 December 2002

Henley Hawks	17 - 3	Newbury Blues
	Report

Dry Leas
Attendance: 510
Referee: Dean Richards

21 December 2002

Nottingham	17 - 20	Stourbridge
	Report

Ireland Avenue
Attendance: 360
Referee: Paul Dix

21 December 2002

Penzance & Newlyn	22 - 11	Launceston
	Report

Mennaye Field
Attendance: 2,000
Referee: Rowan Kitt

21 December 2002

Kendal	P - P	Fylde

- Postponed. Game rescheduled to 28 December 2002.

21 December 2002

Wharfedale	P - P	Harrogate

- Postponed. Game rescheduled to 28 December 2002.

=== Round 14 (rescheduled games) ===
28 December 2002

Kendal	35 - 17	Fylde
	Report

Mint Bridge
Attendance: 379
Referee: Chris Sharp

- Game rescheduled from 21 December 2002.

28 December 2002

Wharfedale	11 - 12	Harrogate
	Report

The Avenue
Attendance: 800
Referee: Tim Wigglesworth

- Game rescheduled from 21 December 2002.

=== Round 15 ===
4 January 2003

Fylde	16 - 22	Bracknell
	Report

Woodlands Memorial Ground
Attendance: 350
Referee: Trevor Fisher

4 January 2003

Launceston	17 - 21	Henley Hawks
	Report

Polson Bridge
Attendance: 450
Referee: Steve Harland

4 January 2003

Newbury Blues	25 - 21	Doncaster
	Report

Monk's Lane
Attendance: 300
Referee: Paul Dix

4 January 2003

Penzance & Newlyn	51 - 21	Kendal
	Report

Mennaye Field
Referee: Nick Williams

4 January 2003

Sedgley Park	43 - 7	Harrogate
	Report

Park Lane
Referee: Graham Hughes

4 January 2003

Stourbridge	25 - 20	Wharfedale
	Report

Stourton Park
Attendance: 300
Referee: Eric Woodmason

4 January 2003

Esher	P - P	Nottingham

- Postponed. Game rescheduled to 15 February 2003.

=== Round 16 ===
11 January 2003

Doncaster	39 - 20	Esher
	Report

Castle Park
Attendance: 850
Referee: Bruce Robertson

11 January 2003

Nottingham	25 - 8	Launceston
	Report

Ireland Avenue
Attendance: 295

11 January 2003

Bracknell	P - P	Penzance & Newlyn

- Postponed. Game rescheduled to 15 February 2003.

11 January 2003

Harrogate	P - P	Stourbridge

- Postponed. Game rescheduled to 8 March 2003.

11 January 2003

Henley Hawks	P - P	Fylde

- Postponed. Game rescheduled to 8 March 2003.

11 January 2003

Kendal	P - P	Sedgley Park

- Postponed. Game rescheduled to 22 March 2003.

11 January 2003

Wharfedale	P - P	Newbury Blues

- Postponed. Game rescheduled to 15 February 2003.

=== Round 17 ===
18 January 2003

Bracknell	28 - 9	Kendal
	Report

Lily Hill Park
Attendance: 150
Referee: Mark Varnon

18 January 2003

Esher	45 - 29	Wharfedale
	Report

Molesey Road
Attendance: 400
Referee: Alan Biggs

18 January 2003

Fylde	29 - 23	Nottingham
	Report

Woodlands Memorial Ground
Attendance: 350
Referee: Llyr Apgeraint-Roberts

18 January 2003

Launceston	10 - 15	Doncaster
	Report

Polson Bridge
Attendance: 200
Referee: Richard Parker-Sedgmore

18 January 2003

Newbury Blues	8 - 26	Harrogate
	Report

Monk's Lane
Attendance: 350
Referee: David Sainsbury

18 January 2003

Penzance & Newlyn	16 - 14	Henley Hawks
	Report

Mennaye Fields
Attendance: 2,200
Referee: Nigel Higginson

18 January 2003

Stourbridge	45 - 24	Sedgley Park
	Report

Stourton Park
Attendance: 400
Referee: Rowan Kitt

=== Round 18 ===
25 January 2003

Doncaster	34 - 14	Fylde
	Report

Castle Park
Attendance: 800
Referee: Paul Dix

25 January 2003

Harrogate	24 - 3	Esher
	Report

Claro Road
Attendance: 480
Referee: Tim Wigglesworth

25 January 2003

Henley Hawks	35 - 5	Bracknell
	Report

Dry Leas
Attendance: 1,025
Referee: David Grashoff

25 January 2003

Kendal	24 - 24	Stourbridge
	Report

Mint Bridge
Attendance: 380
Referee: D Edmunds

25 January 2003

Nottingham	10 - 29	Penzance & Newlyn
	Report

Ireland Avenue
Attendance: 440
Referee: Richard Parker-Sedgmore

25 January 2003

Sedgley Park	47 - 5	Newbury Blues
	Report

Park Lane
Attendance: 420
Referee: Llyr Apgeraint-Roberts

25 January 2003

Wharfedale	15 - 6	Launceston
	Report

The Avenue
Attendance: 400
Referee: Alan Hughes

=== Round 19 ===
1 February 2003

Esher	12 - 10	Sedgley Park
	Report

Molesey Road
Attendance: 400
Referee: David Sainsbury

1 February 2003

Henley Hawks	31 - 3	Kendal
	Report

Dry Leas
Attendance: 515

1 February 2003

Fylde	25 - 20	Wharfedale
	Report

Woodlands Memorial Ground
Attendance: 450
Referee: Tim Beddow

1 February 2003

Launceston	23 - 22	Harrogate
	Report

Polson Bridge
Attendance: 350
Referee: Nick Williams

1 February 2003

Newbury Blues	25 - 26	Stourbridge
	Report

Monk's Lane
Attendance: 375
Referee: Mark Varnon

1 February 2003

Bracknell	P - P	Nottingham

- Postponed. Game rescheduled to 8 March 2003.

1 February 2003

Penzance & Newlyn	P - P	Doncaster

- Postponed. Game rescheduled to 8 March 2003.

=== Round 20 ===
8 February 2003

Doncaster	31 - 0	Bracknell
	Report

Castle Park
Attendance: 750
Referee: D Edmunds

8 February 2003

Harrogate	23 - 13	Fylde
	Report

Claro Road
Attendance: 360
Referee: Chris Sharp

8 February 2003

Kendal	12 - 11	Newbury Blues
	Report

Mint Bridge
Attendance: 289
Referee: Alan Hughes

8 February 2003

Nottingham	15 - 16	Henley Hawks
	Report

Ireland Avenue
Attendance: 346
Referee: Paul Dix

8 February 2003

Sedgley Park	67 - 18	Launceston
	Report

Park Lane
Attendance: 540
Referee: Mark Wilson

8 February 2003

Stourbridge	55 - 43	Esher
	Report

Stourton Park
Attendance: 350
Referee: Eric Woodmason

8 February 2003

Wharfedale	7 - 35	Penzance & Newlyn
	Report

The Avenue
Attendance: 450
Referee: Llyr Apgeraint-Roberts

=== Rounds 15 & 16 (rescheduled games) ===
15 February 2003

Esher	50 - 15	Nottingham
	Report

Molesey Road
Attendance: 300
Referee: Geraint Ashton-Jones

- Game rescheduled from 4 January 2003.

15 February 2003

Wharfedale	25 - 22	Newbury Blues
	Report

The Avenue
Attendance: 304
Referee: Tim Wigglesworth

- Game rescheduled from 11 January 2003.

16 February 2003

Bracknell	27 - 46	Penzance & Newlyn
	Report

Lily Hill Park
Referee: Mark Wilson

- Game rescheduled from 15 January 2003.

=== Round 21 ===
22 February 2003

Bracknell	20 - 19	Wharfedale
	Report

Lily Hill Park
Attendance: 150
Referee: David Grashoff

22 February 2003

Esher	39 - 8	Newbury Blues
	Report

Molesey Road
Attendance: 300

22 February 2003

Fylde	11 - 27	Sedgley Park
	Report

Woodlands Memorial Ground
Attendance: 300
Referee: Trevor Fisher

22 February 2003

Henley Hawks	19 - 30	Doncaster
	Report

Dry Leas
Attendance: 420
Referee: Nick Cousins

22 February 2003

Launceston	28 - 33	Stourbridge
	Report

Polson Bridge
Attendance: 300
Referee: Paul Dix

22 February 2003

Nottingham	31 - 32	Kendal
	Report

Ireland Avenue
Attendance: 245
Referee: Tim Wigglesworth

22 February 2003

Penzance & Newlyn	40 - 5	Harrogate
	Report

Mennaye Field
Attendance: 2,000
Referee: Nigel Higginson

=== Round 22 ===
1 March 2003

Doncaster	19 - 33	Nottingham
	Report

Castle Park
Attendance: 750
Referee: Guy Steel Bodger

1 March 2003

Harrogate	29 - 17	Bracknell
	Report

Claro Road
Attendance: 477
Referee: Bruce Robertson

1 March 2003

Kendal	16 - 22	Esher
	Report

Mint Bridge
Attendance: 424
Referee: Llyr Apgeraint-Roberts

1 March 2003

Newbury Blues	23 - 18	Launceston
	Report

Monk's Lane
Attendance: 485
Referee: Tim Beddow

1 March 2003

Sedgley Park	9 - 34	Penzance & Newlyn
	Report

Park Lane
Attendance: 625
Referee: Paul Dix

1 March 2003

Stourbridge	31 - 14	Fylde
	Report

Stourton Park
Attendance: 350
Referee: D Edmunds

1 March 2003

Wharfedale	13 - 29	Henley Hawks
	Report

The Avenue
Attendance: 500
Referee: Tim Wigglesworth

=== Rounds 16 & 19 (rescheduled games) ===
8 March 2003

Bracknell	25 - 23	Nottingham
	Report

Lily Hill Park
Attendance: 120
Referee: Rowan Kitt

- Game rescheduled from 1 February 2003.

8 March 2003

Harrogate	35 - 5	Stourbridge
	Report

Claro Road
Attendance: 276
Referee: Wayne Barnes

- Game rescheduled from 11 January 2003.

8 March 2003

Henley Hawks	42 - 9	Fylde
	Report

Dry Leas
Attendance: 250
Referee: Guy Steel Bodger

- Game rescheduled from 11 January 2003.

8 March 2003

Penzance & Newlyn	38 - 15	Doncaster
	Report

Mennaye Field
Referee: Richard Parker-Sedgmore

- Game rescheduled from 1 February 2003.

=== Round 23 ===
15 March 2003

Bracknell	24 - 17	Sedgley Park
	Report

Lily Hill Park
Attendance: 120
Referee: David Sainsbury

15 March 2003

Doncaster	62 - 15	Kendal
	Report

Castle Park
Referee: Gareth Copsey

15 March 2003

Fylde	23 - 41	Newbury Blues
	Report

Woodlands Memorial Ground
Attendance: 350
Referee: Chris Sharp

15 March 2003

Henley Hawks	36 - 24	Harrogate
	Report

Dry Leas
Attendance: 715
Referee: Rowan Kitt

15 March 2003

Launceston	21 - 19	Esher
	Report

Polson Bridge
Attendance: 500
Referee: Richard Parker-Sedgmore

15 March 2003

Nottingham	3 - 40	Wharfedale
	Report

Ireland Avenue
Attendance: 360
Referee: Eric Woodmason

15 March 2003

Penzance & Newlyn	44 - 18	Stourbridge
	Report

Mennaye Field
Referee: Andrew Pearce

=== Round 16 (rescheduled game) ===
22 March 2003

Kendal	12 - 29	Sedgley Park
	Report

Mint Bridge
Attendance: 156
Referee: Brendan Fitzmaurice

- Game rescheduled from 11 January 2003.

=== Round 24 ===
29 March 2003

Esher	61 - 21	Fylde
	Report

Molesey Road
Attendance: 300
Referee: Mark Wilson

29 March 2003

Harrogate	19 - 17	Nottingham
	Report

Claro Road
Attendance: 475
Referee: Brendan Fitzmaurice

29 March 2003

Kendal	10 - 26	Launceston
	Report

Mint Bridge
Attendance: 273
Referee: Graham Hannah

29 March 2003

Newbury Blues	15 - 32	Cornish Pirates
	Report

Monk's Lane
Attendance: 875
Referee: Llyr Apgeraint-Roberts

29 March 2003

Sedgley Park	42 - 27	Henley Hawks
	Report

Park Lane
Attendance: 420
Referee: Bruce Robertson

29 March 2003

Stourbridge	14 - 33	Bracknell
	Report

Stourton Park
Attendance: 350
Referee: Richard Parker-Sedgmore

29 March 2003

Wharfedale	14 - 9	Doncaster
	Report

The Avenue
Attendance: 500
Referee: Chris Seeley

=== Round 25 ===
12 April 2003

Bracknell	22 - 24	Newbury Blues
	Report

Lily Hill Park
Attendance: 350
Referee: Alan Biggs

12 April 2003

Doncaster	24 - 8	Harrogate
	Report

Castle Park
Referee: Bruce Robertson

12 April 2003

Fylde	17 - 23	Launceston
	Report

Woodlands Memorial Ground
Attendance: 300
Referee: Nick Williams

12 April 2003

Henley Hawks	74 - 24	Stourbridge
	Report

Dry Leas
Attendance: 515

12 April 2003

Nottingham	29 - 25	Sedgley Park
	Report

Ireland Avenue
Attendance: 426
Referee: Rowan Kitt

12 April 2003

Penzance & Newlyn	36 - 29	Esher
	Report

Mennaye Field
Referee: Andrew Pearce

12 April 2003

Wharfedale	48 - 28	Kendal
	Report

The Avenue
Attendance: 600
Referee: Alan Hughes

=== Round 26 ===
26 April 2003

Esher	23 - 17	Bracknell
	Report

Molesey Road
Attendance: 500
Referee: Llyr Apgeraint-Roberts

26 April 2003

Fylde	10 - 20	Kendal
	Report

Woodlands Memorial Ground
Attendance: 200
Referee: Chris Seeley

26 April 2003

Harrogate	9 - 27	Wharfedale
	Report

Claro Road
Attendance: 1,500
Referee: Tim Wigglesworth

26 April 2003

Launceston	13 - 25	Penzance & Newlyn
	Report

Polson Bridge
Attendance: 2,000
Referee: Paul Dix

26 April 2003

Newbury Blues	33 - 26	Henley Hawks
	Report

Monk's Lane
Attendance: 1,055
Referee: Nick Williams

26 April 2003

Sedgley Park	12 - 28	Doncaster
	Report

Park Lane
Attendance: 485
Referee: D Edmunds

26 April 2003

Stourbridge	38 - 40	Nottingham
	Report

Stourton Park
Attendance: 400
Referee: Mark Wilson

== Total season attendances ==
Club	Home Games	Total	Average	Highest	Lowest	% Capacity
Bracknell	12 (Note: Missing home attendance v Penzance & Newlyn on 16 February 2003.)	2,775	231	350	120	18%
Doncaster	11 (Note: Missing home attendances v Kendal on 15 March 2003 & Harrogate on 12 April 2003.)	7,600	691	850	500	22%
Esher	13	5,000	385	500	250	13%
Fylde	12 (Note: Missing home attendance v Harrogate on 26 October 2002.)	3,800	317	450	200	4%
Harrogate	13	7,103	546	1,500	276	12%
Henley Hawks	13	6,655	512	1,025	250	13%
Kendal	13	4,289	330	483	156	7%
Launceston	13	5,950	458	2,000	200	15%
Newbury Blues	13	6,575	506	1,055	300	6%
Nottingham	13	4,622	356	575	230	7%
Penzance & Newlyn	7 (Note: Missing home attendances v Sedgley Park on 28 September 2002, Wharfedale on 26 October 2002, Kendal on 4 January 2003, Doncaster on 8 March 2003, Stourbridge on 15 March 2003 & Esher on 12 April 2003.)	11,300	1,614	2,200	1,000	46%
Sedgley Park	9 (Note: Missing home attendance v Nottingham on 7 September 2002, Bracknell on 21 September 2002, Fylde on 12 October 2002 & Harrogate on 4 January 2003.)	4,370	486	750	250	16%
Stourbridge	13	4,100	315	400	200	9%
Wharfedale	13	5,954	458	800	304	23%

== Individual statistics ==
- Note that points scorers includes tries as well as conversions, penalties and drop goals.

=== Top points scorers ===
Rank	Player	Team	Appearances	Points
1	(England) Barry Reeves	Henley Hawks	26	327
2	(England) Ben Harvey	Stourbridge	26	315
3	(England) Rob Liley	Doncaster	25	296
4	(Fiji) Nat Saumi	Penzance & Newlyn	20	234
5	(England) Russell Southam	Nottingham	23	229
6	(South Africa) Arnoldus De Jager	Sedgley Park	19	223
7	(England) Jonathon Gregory	Esher	19	214
8	(England) Mike Scott	Kendal	26	201
9	(England) Jonathon Davies	Wharfedale	25	191
10	(England) Lee Cholewa	Harrogate	24	187

=== Top try scorers ===
Rank	Player	Team	Appearances	Tries
1	(England) Nnamdi Obi	Henley Hawks	21	20
2	(Zimbabwe) Victor Olonga	Penzance & Newlyn	23	19
2	(England) Richard Lloyd	Nottingham	24	19
3	(England) Nash Shumba	Esher	19	18
4	(England) Russell Osman	Henley Hawks	21	14
5	(England) James Naylor	Sedgley Park	24	13
6	(Fiji) Laka Waqanivere	Penzance & Newlyn	17	12
7	(England) Jimmy Tucker	Launceston	13	11
7	(England) Andrew Hodgson	Wharfedale	19	11
7	(England) Ed Smithies	Harrogate	20	11

== Season records ==
=== Team ===
Largest home win — 50 pts

74 - 24 Henley Hawks at home to Stourbridge on 12 April 2003

Largest away win — 42 pts

54 - 12 Penzance & Newlyn away to Kendal on 7 December 2002

Most points scored — 74 pts

74 - 24 Henley Hawks at home to Stourbridge on 12 April 2003

Most tries in a match — 10

Henley Hawks at home to Stourbridge on 12 April 2003

Most conversions in a match — 9

Henley Hawks at home to Stourbridge on 12 April 2003

Most penalties in a match — 7 (x2)

Sedgley Park away to Wharfedale on 31 August 2002
Stourbridge at home to Kendal on 16 November 2003

Most drop goals in a match — 2 (x3)

Esher at home to Kendal on 28 September 2002
Kendal at home to Henley Hawks on 2 November 2002
Kendal at home to Newbury Blues on 8 February 2003

=== Player ===
Most points in a match — 28 (x2)

(England) Chris Glynn for Sedgley Park away to Wharfedale on 31 August 2002
(England) Jonathon Davies for Wharfedale at home to Kendal on 12 April 2003

Most tries in a match — 4 (x2)

(Zimbabwe) Victor Olonga for Penzance & Newlyn away to Kendal on 7 December 2002
(England) Nash Shumba for Esher away to Stourbridge on 8 February 2003

Most conversions in a match — 9

(England) Barry Reeves for Henley Hawks at home to Stourbridge on 12 April 2003

Most penalties in a match — 7 (x2)

(England) Chris Glynn for Sedgley Park away to Wharfedale on 31 August 2002
(England) Ben Harvey for Stourbridge at home to Kendal on 16 November 2003

Most drop goals in a match — 2 (x3)

(England) Chris Finch for Esher at home to Kendal on 28 September 2002
(England) Mike Scott for Kendal at home to Henley Hawks on 2 November 2002
(England) Mike Scott for Kendal at home to Newbury Blues on 8 February 2003

=== Attendances ===
Highest — 2,200

Penzance & Newlyn at home to Henley Hawks on 18 January 2003

Lowest — 120 (x2)

Bracknell against Nottingham 8 March 2003 and Sedgley Park on 15 March 2003

Highest Average Attendance — 1,614

Penzance & Newlyn

Lowest Average Attendance — 231

Bracknell

== See also ==
- English Rugby Union Leagues
- English rugby union system
- Rugby union in England
