= 2000–01 National Division Three South =

Rugby union competition in England

- Countries: England
- Champions: Plymouth
- Runners-up: Launceston (not promoted)
- Relegated: Cheltenham, Basingstoke, Weston-super-Mare, Reading
- Attendance: 64,715 (average 573 per match) (Note: Note that 69 home attendances are missing (see below) - so the total attendance will not be 100% accurate. The average attendance has also been taken into account with the missing games not included.)
- Highest attendance: 3,000 – Plymouth v Launceston, 31 March 2001
- Lowest attendance: 100 – Tabard v Reading, 25 November 2000
- Top point scorer: 352 – Nat Saumi (Penzance & Newlyn)
- Top try scorer: 20 – Victor Olonga (Penzance & Newlyn), Dan Ward-Smith (Plymouth)

The 2000–01 National Division Three South was the first season (fourteenth overall) of the fourth division (south) of the English domestic rugby union competition using the name National Division Three South. New teams to the division included Reading and Blackheath who were relegated from the 1999–2000 National League 1 while promoted teams included Basingstoke and Launceston, champions of London Division 1 and South West Division 1 respectively. The league system was 2 points for a win and 1 point for a draw. The promotion system was changed for this season with a playoff system being introduced. The champions of both National Division Three South and National Division Three North would automatically go up but the runners up of these two divisions would meet each other in a one off match (at the home ground of the side with the superior league record) to see who would claim the third and final promotion place to National Division Two.

Plymouth Albion finished the season as champions by winning an incredible 26 games out of 26 to gain promotion to the 2001–02 National Division Two with runners up Launceston 11 points behind. It was an excellent season for newly promoted Launceston but they were unable to top it with promotion, losing 40 – 23 away to the 2000-01 National Division Three North runners up Sedgley Park. It was a great season for south-west based clubs in the division with all four sides occupying the top five league places and the twelve derby matches between the sides had over 21,000 spectators attending in total. At the other end of the table, Cheltenham, Basingstoke, Weston-super-Mare and Reading were the sides to be relegated with all sides being fairly competitive across the course of the season but not having quite enough to keep safe. Cheltenham and Weston-super-Mare would drop to the South West Division 1 for the following season while Basingstoke would make an instant return to London Division 1.

== Structure ==
Each team played home and away matches against each of the other teams, playing a total of twenty-six matches each. The league champions were promoted to National Division 2 while the bottom three sides dropped to either London 1 or South West 1 depending on locality.

== Participating teams and locations ==
Locations of the 2000-01 National Division Three South teams

Team	Stadium	Capacity	City/Area	Previous season
Barking	Goresbrook	1,000	Becontree, Dagenham, London	6th
Basingstoke	Down Grange	2,500 (250 seats)	Basingstoke, Hampshire	Promoted from London 1 (champions)
Blackheath	Rectory Field	3,500 (500 seats)	Blackheath, London	Relegated from National 1 (14th)
Cheltenham	Prince of Wales	3,500 (500 seats)	Cheltenham, Gloucestershire	10th
Clifton	Station Road	2,200 (200 seats)	Clifton, Bristol	7th
Launceston	Polson Bridge	3,000	Launceston, Cornwall	
North Walsham	Norwich Road	1,200	Scottow, North Walsham, Norfolk	3rd
Penzance & Newlyn	Mennaye Field	3,500	Penzance, Cornwall	2nd
Plymouth Albion	Beacon Park	3,500 (450 seats) (Note: Ground capacity at Beacon Park reassessed from 1,950 to around 3,500 for the 2000–01 season.)	Plymouth, Devon	4th
Reading	Holme Park		Sonning, Reading, Berkshire	Relegated from National 1 (13th)
Redruth	Recreation Ground	3,500 (580 seats)	Redruth, Cornwall	5th
Tabard	Cobden Hill		Radlett, Hertfordshire	8th
Westcombe Park	Goddington Dene	3,200 (200 seats)	Orpington, London	9th
Weston-super-Mare	Recreation Ground	3,000	Weston-super-Mare, Somerset	11th

== Final league table ==
2000–01 National Division Three South table
Pos	Team	Pld	W	D	L	PF	PA	PD	Pts
1	Plymouth Albion (C)	26	26	0	0	910	240	+670	52
2	Launceston	26	20	1	5	777	396	+381	41
3	Penzance & Newlyn	26	18	2	6	823	492	+331	38
4	Barking	26	15	1	10	611	481	+130	31
5	Redruth	26	14	1	11	691	600	+91	29
6	North Walsham	26	12	1	13	550	461	+89	25
7	Westcombe Park	26	12	0	14	552	664	−112	24
8	Clifton	26	10	1	15	509	628	−119	21
9	Blackheath	26	10	0	16	562	641	−79	20
10	Tabard	26	9	2	15	415	721	−306	20
11	Reading (R)	26	9	1	16	465	643	−178	19
12	Weston-super-Mare (R)	26	7	1	18	370	691	−321	15
13	Basingstoke (R)	26	7	1	18	345	685	−340	15
14	Cheltenham (R)	26	7	0	19	492	729	−237	14

Updated to match(es) played on 28 April 2001. Source: englandrugby.com
(C) Champions; (R) Relegated

== Results ==
Be aware that some of the early season scores from Rugby Statbunker are incorrect (possibly due to an automatic scoring system used on that website) as they are different from those reported in the Telegraph. I have used references from the Telegraph wherever possible which should tie in with the results from the England rugby website.

=== Round 1 ===
2 September 2000

Barking	32 - 19	Basingstoke
	Report

Goresbrook
Referee: Wayne Barnes

2 September 2000

Blackheath	34 - 9	Weston-super-Mare
	Report

Rectory Field
Attendance: 300
Referee: Charles Palmer

2 September 2000

Clifton	24 - 24	Tabard
	Report

Station Road
Attendance: 200
Referee: Nigel Higginson

2 September 2000

North Walsham	28 - 10	Reading
	Report

Norwich Road

2 September 2000

Plymouth Albion	19 - 0	Penzance & Newlyn
	Report

Beacon Park
Attendance: 1,500
Referee: Alan Biggs

2 September 2000

Redruth	29 - 34	Launceston
	Report

The Recreation Ground
Attendance: 700
Referee: Nick Williams

2 September 2000

Westcombe Park	14 - 39	Cheltenham
	Report

Goddington Dene
Attendance: 250
Referee: R Glynne Jones

=== Round 2 ===
9 September 2000

Barking	23 - 10	Cheltenham
	Report

Goresbrook
Attendance: 300
Referee: Ian Langley

9 September 2000

Basingstoke	17 - 30	Launceston
	Report

Down Grange
Attendance: 200
Referee: Alan Biggs

9 September 2000

North Walsham	41 - 3	Weston-super-Mare
	Report

Norwich Road
Attendance: 300
Referee: Paul Dickens

9 September 2000

Westcombe Park	26 - 39	Penzance & Newlyn
	Report

Goddington Dene
Attendance: 350
Referee: Charles Palmer

9 September 2000

Clifton	P - P	Blackheath

- Postponed. Game rescheduled to 23 September 2000.

9 September 2000

Plymouth Albion	P - P	Tabard

- Postponed. Game rescheduled to 23 September 2000.

9 September 2000

Redruth	P - P	Reading

- Postponed. Game rescheduled to 23 September 2000.

=== Round 3 ===
16 September 2000

Blackheath	8 - 26	Barking
	Report

Rectory Field
Attendance: 200
Referee: Steve Haarland

16 September 2000

Penzance & Newlyn	35 - 11	Redruth
	Report

Mennaye Field
Attendance: 1,500
Referee: Nick Williams

16 September 2000

Tabard	36 - 21	North Walsham
	Report

Cobden Hill
Attendance: 250
Referee: R Francis

16 September 2000

Weston-super-Mare	10 - 29	Clifton
	Report

Recreation Ground
Attendance: 300
Referee: Paul Dix

16 September 2000

Cheltenham	P - P	Basingstoke

- Postponed. Game rescheduled to 4 November 2000.

16 September 2000

Launceston	P - P	Westcombe Park

- Postponed. Game rescheduled to 4 November 2000.

16 September 2000

Reading	P - P	Plymouth Albion

- Postponed. Game rescheduled to 3 February 2001.

=== Round 2 (rescheduled games) ===
23 September 2000

Clifton	38 - 18	Blackheath
	Report

Station Road

- Game rescheduled from 9 September 2000.

23 September 2000

Plymouth Albion	58 - 17	Tabard
	Report

Beacon Park
Attendance: 1,000
Referee: Paul Dix

- Game rescheduled from 9 September 2000.

23 September 2000

Redruth	29 - 22	Reading
	Report

The Recreation Ground
Attendance: 700
Referee: R Glynne Jones

- Game rescheduled from 9 September 2000.

=== Round 4 ===
30 September 2000

Blackheath	14 - 29	North Walsham
	Report

Rectory Field
Attendance: 250
Referee: Nick Williams

30 September 2000

Clifton	29 - 12	Barking
	Report

Station Road

30 September 2000

Launceston	63 - 7	Cheltenham
	Report

Polson Bridge
Attendance: 400
Referee: Paul Dix

30 September 2000

Penzance & Newlyn	28 - 17	Basingstoke
	Report

Mennaye Field

30 September 2000

Reading	32 - 25	Westcombe Park
	Report

Holme Park
Attendance: 200
Referee: R Francis

30 September 2000

Tabard	17 - 48	Redruth
	Report

Cobden Hill

30 September 2000

Weston-super-Mare	7 - 43	Plymouth Albion
	Report

Recreation Ground
Attendance: 250
Referee: Anthony Ellison

=== Round 5 ===
14 October 2000

Barking	20 - 18	Launceston
	Report

Goresbrook
Attendance: 250

14 October 2000

Basingstoke	9 - 6	Reading
	Report

Down Grange

14 October 2000

Cheltenham	24 - 40	Penzance & Newlyn
	Report

Prince of Wales Stadium
Attendance: 250
Referee: Paul Dickens

14 October 2000

North Walsham	19 - 6	Clifton
	Report

Norwich Road
Attendance: 250
Referee: Ian Langley

14 October 2000

Plymouth Albion	41 - 0	Blackheath
	Report

Beacon Park
Attendance: 700
Referee: Wayne Barnes

14 October 2000

Redruth	30 - 6	Weston-super-Mare
	Report

The Recreation Ground
Attendance: 600
Referee: Andrew Tong

14 October 2000

Westcombe Park	21 - 23	Tabard
	Report

Goddington Dene
Attendance: 250

=== Round 6 ===
21 October 2000

Tabard	15 - 22	Basingstoke
	Report

Cobden Hill
Attendance: 180

21 October 2000

Weston-super-Mare	14 - 26	Westcombe Park
	Report

Recreation Ground
Attendance: 200
Referee: Steve Haarland

21 October 2000

Blackheath	P - P	Redruth

- Postponed. Game rescheduled to 4 November 2000.

21 October 2000

Clifton	P - P	Plymouth Albion

- Postponed. Game rescheduled to 17 February 2001.

21 October 2000

North Walsham	P - P	Barking

- Postponed. Game rescheduled to 21 October 2000.

21 October 2000

Penzance & Newlyn	P - P	Launceston

- Postponed. Game rescheduled to 17 February 2001.

21 October 2000

Reading	P - P	Cheltenham

- Postponed. Game rescheduled to 3 March 2001.

=== Round 7 ===
28 October 2000

Barking	17 - 17	Penzance & Newlyn
	Report

Goresbrook

28 October 2000

Basingstoke	10 - 15	Weston-super-Mare
	Report

Down Grange
Attendance: 200
Referee: Ian Langley

28 October 2000

Cheltenham	14 - 19	Tabard
	Report

Prince of Wales Stadium
Attendance: 200
Referee: Rob Sawyer

28 October 2000

Launceston	37 - 0	Reading
	Report

Polson Bridge
Attendance: 400
Referee: Richard Parker-Sedgmore

28 October 2000

Plymouth Albion	20 - 14	North Walsham
	Report

Beacon Park
Attendance: 900
Referee: Chris Rees

28 October 2000

Redruth	48 - 31	Clifton
	Report

The Recreation Ground
Attendance: 600

28 October 2000

Westcombe Park	30 - 22	Blackheath
	Report

Goddington Dene
Referee: 400

=== Rounds 3 & 6 (rescheduled games) ===
4 November 2000

Blackheath	27 - 48	Redruth
	Report

Rectory Field
Attendance: 180
Referee: Andrew Tong

- Game rescheduled from 21 October 2000.

4 November 2000

Cheltenham	34 - 12	Basingstoke
	Report

Prince of Wales Stadium
Attendance: 200
Referee: Steve Haarland

- Game rescheduled from 16 September 2000.

4 November 2000

Launceston	48 - 10	Westcombe Park
	Report

Polson Bridge
Attendance: 300
Referee: Anthony Ellison

- Game rescheduled from 16 September 2000.

4 November 2000

North Walsham	3 - 10	Barking
	Report

Norwich Road
Attendance: 250
Referee: Mark Rose

- Game rescheduled from 21 October 2000.

=== Round 8 ===
11 November 2000

Blackheath	8 - 16	Basingstoke
	Report

Rectory Field

11 November 2000

Clifton	20 - 24	Westcombe Park
	Report

Station Road
Attendance: 200
Referee: Paul Dickens

11 November 2000

North Walsham	26 - 5	Redruth
	Report

Norwich Road
Attendance: 250
Referee: David Robertshaw

11 November 2000

Plymouth Albion	26 - 10	Barking
	Report

Beacon Park
Attendance: 1,000
Referee: Nick Williams

11 November 2000

Reading	23 - 12	Penzance & Newlyn
	Report

Holme Park
Attendance: 250
Referee: Ian Langley

11 November 2000

Tabard	13 - 26	Launceston
	Report

Cobden Hill
Attendance: 200

11 November 2000

Weston-super-Mare	21 - 10	Cheltenham
	Report

Recreation Ground
Attendance: 250
Referee: David Rose

=== Round 9 ===
18 November 2000

Barking	20 - 27	Reading
	Report

Goresbrook
Attendance: 200
Referee: David Robertshaw

18 November 2000

Basingstoke	10 - 19	Clifton
	Report

Down Grange

18 November 2000

Cheltenham	32 - 20	Blackheath
	Report

Prince of Wales Stadium
Attendance: 200
Referee: Ian Langley

18 November 2000

Launceston	51 - 5	Weston-super-Mare
	Report

Polson Bridge
Attendance: 320
Referee: Steve Haarland

18 November 2000

Penzance & Newlyn	24 - 24	Tabard
	Report

Mennaye Field

18 November 2000

Redruth	19 - 30	Plymouth Albion
	Report

The Recreation Ground
Attendance: 1,000
Referee: Rob Debney

18 November 2000

Westcombe Park	13 - 10	North Walsham
	Report

Goddington Dene
Attendance: 250
Referee: Andrew Tong

=== Round 10 ===
25 November 2000

Blackheath	20 - 25	Launceston
	Report

Rectory Field
Attendance: 250
Referee: Nigel Higginson

25 November 2000

Clifton	19 - 8	Cheltenham
	Report

Station Road
Referee: Mark Rose

25 November 2000

North Walsham	25 - 3	Basingstoke
	Report

Norwich Road
Referee: Rob Sawyer

25 November 2000

Plymouth Albion	51 - 10	Westcombe Park
	Report

Beacon Park
Attendance: 850
Referee: D May

25 November 2000

Redruth	20 - 12	Barking
	Report

The Recreation Ground
Attendance: 600
Referee: Richard Parker-Sedgmore

25 November 2000

Tabard	8 - 3	Reading
	Report

Cobden Hill
Attendance: 100
Referee: David Rose

25 November 2000

Weston-super-Mare	14 - 17	Penzance & Newlyn
	Report

Recreation Ground
Attendance: 250
Referee: Paul Dickens

=== Round 11 ===
2 December 2000

Barking	21 - 3	Tabard
	Report

Goresbrook

2 December 2000

Basingstoke	0 - 32	Plymouth Albion
	Report

Down Grange
Attendance: R Francis

2 December 2000

Cheltenham	12 - 32	North Walsham
	Report

Prince of Wales Stadium
Attendance: 200
Referee: Nick Williams

2 December 2000

Launceston	37 - 20	Clifton
	Report

Polson Bridge
Attendance: 450
Referee: Andrew Tong

2 December 2000

Penzance & Newlyn	51 - 14	Blackheath
	Report

Mennaye Field
Attendance: 800
Referee: R Francis

2 December 2000

Reading	26 - 15	Weston-super-Mare
	Report

Holme Park
Attendance: 150

2 December 2000

Westcombe Park	35 - 18	Redruth
	Report

Goddington Dene
Attendance: 120
Referee: Charles Palmer

=== Round 12 ===
9 December 2000

Clifton	14 - 20	Penzance & Newlyn
	Report

Station Road
Referee: David Robertshaw

9 December 2000

North Walsham	16 - 13	Launceston
	Report

Norwich Road
Attendance: 300
Referee: Ian Langley

9 December 2000

Plymouth Albion	50 - 10	Cheltenham
	Report

Beacon Park
Attendance: 1,000
Referee: Richard Parker-Sedgmore

9 December 2000

Redruth	15 - 18	Basingstoke
	Report

The Recreation Ground
Attendance: 650
Referee: David Rose

9 December 2000

Westcombe Park	8 - 31	Barking
	Report

Goddington Dene
Attendance: 300
Referee: R Francis

9 December 2000

Blackheath	P - P	Reading

- Postponed. Game rescheduled to 17 February 2001.

9 December 2000

Weston-super-Mare	P - P	Tabard

- Postponed. Game rescheduled to 3 February 2001.

=== Round 13 ===
16 December 2000

Barking	40 - 10	Weston-super-Mare
	Report

Goresbrook
Attendance: 300
Referee: Huw Jones-Williams

16 December 2000

Basingstoke	3 - 42	Westcombe Park
	Report

Down Grange
Attendance: 200
Referee: Andrew Tong

16 December 2000

Cheltenham	34 - 13	Redruth
	Report

Prince of Wales Stadium
Attendance: 250
Referee: Rob Sheard

16 December 2000

Launceston	6 - 13	Plymouth Albion
	Report

Polson Bridge
Attendance: 2,000
Referee: Tony Spreadbury

16 December 2000

Penzance & Newlyn	63 - 31	North Walsham
	Report

Mennaye Field
Attendance: 800
Referee: R Francis

16 December 2000

Reading	30 - 12	Clifton
	Report

Holme Park
Attendance: 200
Referee: Anthony Ellison

16 December 2000

Tabard	40 - 24	Blackheath
	Report

Cobden Hill
Attendance: 200
Referee: Charles Palmer

=== Round 14 ===
23 December 2000

Clifton	25 - 29	Launceston
	Report

Station Road
Attendance: 150
Referee: Nick Williams

23 December 2000

North Walsham	32 - 8	Cheltenham
	Report

Norwich Road
Attendance: 320
Referee: Paul Dickens

23 December 2000

Plymouth Albion	72 - 6	Basingstoke
	Report

Beacon Park
Attendance: 1,200
Referee: R Glynne Jones

23 December 2000

Redruth	45 - 20	Westcombe Park
	Report

The Recreation Ground
Attendance: 700
Referee: Steve Haarland

23 December 2000

Tabard	19 - 29	Barking
	Report

Cobden Hill

23 December 2000

Weston-super-Mare	15 - 23	Reading
	Report

Recreation Ground
Attendance: 250
Referee: R Francis

23 December 2000

Penzance & Newlyn	P - P	Blackheath

- Postponed. Game rescheduled to 3 February 2001.

=== Round 15 ===
30 December 2000

Penzance & Newlyn	50 - 13	Weston-super-Mare
	Report

Mennaye Field
Attendance: 800
Referee: Alan Biggs

30 December 2000

Barking	P - P	Redruth

- Postponed. Game rescheduled to 3 February 2001.

30 December 2000

Basingstoke	P - P	North Walsham

- Postponed. Game rescheduled to 3 February 2001.

30 December 2000

Cheltenham	P - P	Clifton

- Postponed. Game rescheduled to 3 February 2001.

30 December 2000

Launceston	P - P	Blackheath

- Postponed. Game rescheduled to 7 April 2001.

30 December 2000

Reading	P - P	Tabard

- Postponed. Game rescheduled to 7 April 2001.

30 December 2000

Westcombe Park	P - P	Plymouth Albion

- Postponed. Game rescheduled to 3 March 2001.

=== Round 16 ===
6 January 2001

Blackheath	27 - 10	Cheltenham
	Report

Rectory Field

6 January 2001

Clifton	34 - 8	Basingstoke
	Report

Station Road

6 January 2001

North Walsham	11 - 12	Westcombe Park
	Report

Norwich Road
Attendance: 300

6 January 2001

Plymouth Albion	30 - 10	Redruth
	Report

Beacon Park
Attendance: 2,000
Referee: Nick Williams

6 January 2001

Reading	3 - 37	Barking
	Report

Holme Park

6 January 2001

Tabard	17 - 68	Penzance & Newlyn
	Report

Cobden Hill
Attendance: 220

6 January 2001

Weston-super-Mare	25 - 35	Launceston
	Report

Recreation Ground
Attendance: 200

=== Round 17 ===
13 January 2001

Barking	36 - 37	Plymouth Albion
	Report

Goresbrook
Referee: David Robertshaw

13 January 2001

Basingstoke	12 - 43	Blackheath
	Report

Down Grange

13 January 2001

Cheltenham	36 - 19	Weston-super-Mare
	Report

Prince of Wales Stadium
Attendance: 200
Referee: Charles Palmer

13 January 2001

Launceston	40 - 0	Tabard
	Report

Polson Bridge
Attendance: 300
Referee: Steve Haarland

13 January 2001

Penzance & Newlyn	48 - 12	Reading
	Report

Mennaye Field
Attendance: 800

13 January 2001

Redruth	43 - 19	North Walsham
	Report

The Recreation Ground
Attendance: 700
Referee: Paul Dix

13 January 2001

Westcombe Park	34 - 19	Clifton
	Report

Goddington Dene
Attendance: 250
Referee: Andrew Tong

=== Round 18 ===
20 January 2001

Blackheath	25 - 14	Westcombe Park
	Report

Rectory Field
Attendance: 600
Referee: Ian Langley

20 January 2001

Clifton	13 - 23	Redruth
	Report

Station Road
Attendance: 120
Referee: Steve Haarland

20 January 2001

Penzance & Newlyn	16 - 13	Barking
	Report

Mennaye Field
Attendance: 800
Referee: Andrew Pearce

20 January 2001

North Walsham	P - P	Plymouth Albion

- Postponed. Game rescheduled to 7 April 2001.

20 January 2001

Reading	P - P	Launceston

- Postponed. Game rescheduled to 21 April 2001.

20 January 2001

Tabard	P - P	Cheltenham

- Postponed. Game rescheduled to 17 February 2001.

20 January 2001

Weston-super-Mare	P - P	Basingstoke

- Postponed. Game rescheduled to 17 February 2001.

=== Round 19 ===
27 January 2001

Barking	31 - 29	North Walsham
	Report

Goresbrook
Referee: Mark Rose

27 January 2001

Basingstoke	19 - 29	Tabard
	Report

Down Grange
Referee: Ian Langley

27 January 2001

Cheltenham	33 - 22	Reading
	Report

Prince of Wales Stadium
Attendance: 150
Referee: D Edmunds

27 January 2001

Launceston	31 - 5	Penzance & Newlyn
	Report

Polson Bridge
Attendance: 2,000

27 January 2001

Plymouth Albion	49 - 0	Clifton
	Report

Beacon Park
Attendance: 1,200
Referee: Rob Debney

27 January 2001

Redruth	35 - 23	Blackheath
	Report

The Recreation Ground
Attendance: 400
Referee: Steve Haarland

27 January 2001

Westcombe Park	5 - 15	Weston-super-Mare
	Report

Goddington Dene
Attendance: 200
Referee: Paul Dickens

=== Rounds 3, 12, 14 & 15 (rescheduled games) ===
3 February 2001

Barking	34 - 18	Redruth

Goresbrook

- Game rescheduled from 30 December 2000.

3 February 2001

Basingstoke	13 - 13	North Walsham
	Report

Down Grange

- Game rescheduled from 30 December 2000.

3 February 2001

Blackheath	38 - 37	Penzance & Newlyn
	Report

Rectory Field
Attendance: 400
Referee: David Sainsbury

- Game rescheduled from 23 December 2000.

3 February 2001

Cheltenham	9 - 6	Clifton
	Report

Prince of Wales Stadium
Attendance: 200
Referee: Nick Williams

- Game rescheduled from 30 December 2000.

3 February 2001

Reading	0 - 38	Plymouth Albion
	Report

Holme Park
Attendance: 270
Referee: Paul Dickens

- Game rescheduled from 16 September 2000.

3 February 2001

Weston-super-Mare	9 - 12	Tabard
	Report

Recreation Ground

- Game rescheduled from 9 December 2000.

=== Round 20 ===
10 February 2001

Blackheath	13 - 19	Plymouth Albion
	Report

Rectory Field

10 February 2001

Clifton	21 - 20	North Walsham
	Report

Station Road
Referee: David Rose

10 February 2001

Launceston	42 - 13	Barking
	Report

Polson Bridge
Attendance: 420
Referee: D May

10 February 2001

Penzance & Newlyn	58 - 0	Cheltenham
	Report

Mennaye Field

10 February 2001

Reading	14 - 3	Basingstoke
	Report

Holme Park
Attendance: 200
Referee: Andrew Tong

10 February 2001

Tabard	19 - 29	Westcombe Park
	Report

Cobden Hill
Attendance: 200
Referee: R Francis

10 February 2001

Weston-super-Mare	16 - 16	Redruth
	Report

Recreation Ground
Attendance: 500
Referee: Ian Langley

=== Rounds 6, 12 & 18 (rescheduled games) ===
17 February 2001

Blackheath	19 - 15	Reading
	Report

Rectory Field
Referee: Nigel Higginson

- Game rescheduled from 9 December 2000.

17 February 2001

Clifton	12 - 37	Plymouth Albion
	Report

Station Road
Referee: Richard Parker-Sedgmore

- Game rescheduled from 21 October 2000.

17 February 2001

Penzance & Newlyn	43 - 20	Launceston
	Report

Mennaye Field
Attendance: 2,000
Referee: Alan Biggs

- Game rescheduled from 21 October 2000.

17 February 2001

Tabard	29 - 20	Cheltenham
	Report

Cobden Hill

- Game rescheduled from 17 February 2001.

17 February 2001

Weston-super-Mare	8 - 14	Basingstoke
	Report

Recreation Ground

- Game rescheduled from 20 January 2001.

=== Round 21 ===
24 February 2001

Barking	50 - 18	Clifton
	Report

Goresbrook
Referee: Charles Palmer

24 February 2001

Basingstoke	18 - 53	Penzance & Newlyn
	Report

Down Grange
Attendance: 350
Referee: R Francis

24 February 2001

Cheltenham	19 - 31	Launceston

Prince of Wales Stadium

24 February 2001

North Walsham	15 - 6	Blackheath
	Report

Norwich Road
Attendance: 250
Referee: Andrew Tong

24 February 2001

Plymouth Albion	52 - 0	Weston-super-Mare
	Report

Beacon Park
Attendance: 1,100
Referee: Huw Jones-Williams

24 February 2001

Redruth	32 - 0	Tabard
	Report

The Recreation Ground
Attendance: 500
Referee: Nigel Higginson

24 February 2001

Westcombe Park	36 - 27	Reading
	Report

Goddington Dene
Attendance: 250
Referee: Mark Wilson

=== Rounds 6 & 15 (rescheduled games) ===
3 March 2001

Reading	29 - 26	Cheltenham
	Report

Holme Park
Referee: Ian Langley

- Game rescheduled from 21 October 2000.

3 March 2001

Westcombe Park	11 - 32	Plymouth Albion
	Report

Goddington Dene
Attendance: 300
Referee: Charles Palmer

- Game rescheduled from 30 December 2000.

=== Round 22 ===
10 March 2001

Blackheath	40 - 0	Clifton
	Report

Rectory Field
Attendance: 140
Referee: Paul Dickens

10 March 2001

Cheltenham	15 - 25	Barking
	Report

Prince of Wales Stadium
Attendance: 200
Referee: David Rose

10 March 2001

Penzance & Newlyn	31 - 13	Westcombe Park
	Report

Mennaye Field
Attendance: 900
Referee: Richard Parker-Sedgmore

10 March 2001

Reading	47 - 35	Redruth
	Report

Holme Park

10 March 2001

Tabard	8 - 43	Plymouth Albion
	Report

Cobden Hill
Referee: Ian Langley

10 March 2001

Weston-super-Mare	38 - 29	North Walsham
	Report

Recreation Ground
Attendance: 300
Referee: D May

10 March 2001

Launceston	P - P	Basingstoke

- Postponed. Game rescheduled to 28 April 2001.

=== Round 23 ===
17 March 2001

Barking	15 - 20	Blackheath
	Report

Goresbrook
Referee: Ian Langley

17 March 2001

Basingstoke	28 - 10	Cheltenham
	Report

Down Grange
Referee: Andrew Canning

17 March 2001

North Walsham	16 - 0	Tabard
	Report

Norwich Road
Attendance: 200
Referee: Rob Sawyer

17 March 2001

Plymouth Albion	29 - 0	Reading
	Report

Beacon Park
Attendance: 1,200
Referee: Alan Biggs

17 March 2001

Redruth	23 - 6	Penzance & Newlyn
	Report

The Recreation Ground
Attendance: 2,000
Referee: Andrew Tong

17 March 2001

Westcombe Park	10 - 24	Launceston
	Report

Goddington Dene

17 March 2001

Clifton	P - P	Weston-super-Mare

- Postponed. Game rescheduled to 28 April 2001.

=== Round 24 ===
24 March 2001

Basingstoke	27 - 8	Barking
	Report

Down Grange

24 March 2001

Cheltenham	29 - 39	Westcombe Park
	Report

Prince of Wales Stadium
Attendance: 200
Referee: D May

24 March 2001

Launceston	11 - 9	Redruth
	Report

Polson Bridge
Attendance: 1,000
Referee: Andrew Pearce

24 March 2001

Penzance & Newlyn	13 - 36	Plymouth Albion
	Report

Mennaye Field
Attendance: 2,000
Referee: Eric Woodmason

24 March 2001

Reading	21 - 25	North Walsham

Holme Park

24 March 2001

Tabard	P - P	Clifton

- Postponed. Game rescheduled to 21 April 2001.

24 March 2001

Weston-super-Mare	P - P	Blackheath

- Postponed. Game rescheduled to 21 April 2001.

=== Round 25 ===
31 March 2001

Blackheath	39 - 5	Tabard
	Report

Rectory Field
Referee: Charles Palmer

31 March 2001

Clifton	31 - 19	Reading
	Report

Station Road

31 March 2001

North Walsham	14 - 24	Penzance & Newlyn
	Report

Norwich Road

31 March 2001

Plymouth Albion	13 - 6	Launceston
	Report

Beacon Park
Attendance: 3,000
Referee: Nick Cousins

31 March 2001

Redruth	38 - 28	Cheltenham
	Report

The Recreation Ground
Attendance: 1,000
Referee: David Rose

31 March 2001

Westcombe Park	28 - 7	Basingstoke
	Report

Goddington Dene

31 March 2001

Weston-super-Mare	22 - 16	Barking
	Report

Recreation Ground
Attendance: 200
Referee: Alan Biggs

=== Rounds 15 & 18 (rescheduled games) ===
7 April 2001

Launceston	35 - 13	Blackheath
	Report

Polson Bridge
Attendance: 400
Referee: Steve Haarland

- Game rescheduled from 30 December 2000.

7 April 2001

North Walsham	17 - 20	Plymouth Albion
	Report

Norwich Road
Referee: Mark Rose

- Game rescheduled from 20 January 2001.

7 April 2001

Reading	10 - 13	Tabard
	Report

Holme Park

- Game rescheduled from 30 December 2000.

=== Round 26 ===
14 April 2001

Barking	30 - 17	Westcombe Park
	Report

Goresbrook

14 April 2001

Basingstoke	26 - 31	Redruth
	Report

Down Grange
Attendance: 200
Referee: Nick Williams

14 April 2001

Cheltenham	15 - 20	Plymouth Albion
	Report

Prince of Wales Stadium

14 April 2001

Launceston	16 - 15	North Walsham
	Report

Polson Bridge
Attendance: 400
Referee: D May

14 April 2001

Penzance & Newlyn	25 - 10	Clifton
	Report

Mennaye Field
Attendance: 1,000

14 April 2001

Reading	16 - 32	Blackheath
	Report

Holme Park

14 April 2001

Tabard	13 - 20	Weston-super-Mare
	Report

Cobden Hill

=== Rounds 18 & 24 (rescheduled games) ===
21 April 2001

Reading	28 - 28	Launceston
	Report

Holme Park
Referee: Huw Jones-Williams

- Game rescheduled from 20 January 2001.

21 April 2001

Tabard	12 - 41	Clifton
	Report

Cobden Hill

- Game rescheduled from 24 March 2001.

21 April 2001

Weston-super-Mare	28 - 15	Blackheath
	Report

Recreation Ground

- Game rescheduled from 24 March 2001.

=== Rounds 22 & 23 (rescheduled games) ===
28 April 2001

Clifton	18 - 13	Weston-super-Mare
	Report

Station Road

- Game rescheduled from 17 March 2001.

28 April 2001

Launceston	41 - 8	Basingstoke
	Report

Polson Bridge
Attendance: 325

- Game rescheduled from 10 March 2001.

=== Promotion play-off ===
The league runners up of National Division Three South and North would meet in a playoff game for promotion to National Division Two. Sedgley Park were runners-up in the north and because they had a better league record than south runners-up, Launceston, they hosted the play-off match.

26 May 2001

Sedgley Park	40 - 23	Launceston
	Report

Park Lane
Attendance: 1,500
Referee: Paul Dix

== Total season attendances ==
Club	Home Games	Total	Average	Highest	Lowest	% Capacity
Barking	3 (Note: Missing home attendances v Basingstoke on 2 September 2000, Penzance & Newlyn on 28 October 2000, Tabard on 2 December 2000, Plymouth on 30 January 2001, North Walsham 27 January 2001, Reading on 3 February 2001, Redruth on 3 February 2001, Clifton on 24 February 2001, Blackheath on 17 March 2001 and Westcombe Park on 14 April 2001.)	750	250	300	200	25%
Basingstoke	5 (Note: Missing home attendances v Reading on 14 October 2000, Clifton on 18 November 2000, Plymouth Albion on 2 December 2000, Blackheath on 13 January 2001, Tabard on 27 January 2001, North Walsham on 3 February 2001, Cheltenham on 17 March 2001 and Barking on 24 March 2001.)	1,150	230	350	200	9%
Blackheath	8 (Note: Missing home attendances v Basingstoke on 11 November 2000, Cheltenham on 6 January 2001, Plymouth on 10 February 2001, Reading on 17 February 2001 and Tabard on 31 March 2001.)	2,320	290	600	140	8%
Cheltenham	11 (Note: Missing home attendances v Launceston on 24 February 2001 and Plymouth on 14 April 2001.)	2,250	205	250	150	6%
Clifton	4 (Note: Missing home attendances v Blackheath on 23 September 2000, Barking on 30 September 2000, Cheltenham on 25 November 2000, Penzance & Newlyn on 9 December 2000, Basingstoke on 6 January 2001, North Walsham on 10 February 2001, Plymouth on 17 February 2001, Reading on 31 March 2001 and Weston-super-Mare on 28 April 2001.)	670	168	200	120	8%
Launceston	13	8,715	670	2,000	300	22%
North Walsham	9 (Note: Missing home attendances v Reading on 2 September 2000, Basingstoke on 25 November 2000, Penzance & Newlyn on 31 March 2001 and Plymouth on 7 April 2001.)	2,420	269	320	200	22%
Penzance & Newlyn	10 (Note: Missing home attendances v Basingstoke on 30 September 2000, Tabard on 18 November 2000 and Cheltenham on 10 February 2001.)	11,400	1,140	2,000	800	33%
Plymouth Albion	13	16,650	1,281	3,000	700	37%
Reading	6 (Note: Missing home attendances v Barking on 6 January 2001, Cheltenham on 3 March 2001, Redruth on 10 March 2001, North Walsham on 24 March 2001, Tabard on 7 April 2001, Blackheath on 14 April 2001 and Launceston on 21 April 2001.)	1,270	212	270	150	
Redruth	13	10,150	781	2,000	400	22%
Tabard	7 (Note: Missing home attendances v Redruth on 30 September 2000, Barking on 23 December 2000, Cheltenham on 17 February 2001, Plymouth on 10 March 2001, Weston-super-Mare on 14 April 2001 and Clifton on 21 April 2001.)	1,350	193	250	100	
Westcombe Park	11 (Note: Missing home attendances v Launceston on 17 March 2001 and Basingstoke on 31 March 2001.)	2,920	265	400	120	8%
Weston-super-Mare	10 (Note: Missing home attendances v Tabard on 3 February 2001, Basingstoke on 17 February 2001 and Blackheath on 21 April 2001.)	2,700	270	500	200	9%

== Individual statistics ==
- Note that points scorers includes tries as well as conversions, penalties and drop goals.

=== Top points scorers ===
Rank	Player	Team	Appearances	Points
1	(Fiji) Nat Saumi	Penzance & Newlyn	23	352
2	(England) Danny Sloman	Launceston	25	309
3	(England) Tom Barlow	Plymouth Albion	25	276
4	(England) Jon Martin	Clifton	24	251
5	(England) Derek Coates	Westcombe Park	22	222
6	(England) Steve Larkins	Redruth	24	217
7	(England) Billy Murphy	Barking	21	199
8	(England) Phil Friel	North Walsham	17	189
9	(England) Phil Watters	Cheltenham	18	171
10	(England) Justin Azzopardi	Tabard	22	167

=== Top try scorers ===
Rank	Player	Team	Appearances	Tries
1	(Zimbabwe) Victor Olonga	Penzance & Newlyn	18	20
1	(England) Dan Ward-Smith	Plymouth Albion	26	20
2	(Fiji) Nat Saumi	Penzance & Newlyn	23	17
2	(England) Peter Redgrave	Penzance & Newlyn	26	17
3	(England) Fred Lewis	Barking	25	15
4	(England) Barnaby Kent	Clifton	26	14
4	(England) Richard Thompson	Plymouth Albion	26	14
5	(Samoa) Mark Fatialofa	Launceston	18	13
5	(England) Charles Abban	Blackheath	23	13
5	(England) Andy Matchett	Plymouth Albion	24	13

== Season records ==
=== Team ===
Largest home win — 68 pts

72 - 6 Plymouth Albion at home to Basingstoke on 23 December 2000

Largest away win — 51 pts

68 - 17 Penzance & Newlyn away to Tabard on 6 January 2001

Most points scored — 72 pts

72 - 6 Plymouth Albion at home to Basingstoke on 23 December 2000

Most tries in a match — 11

Plymouth Albion at home to Basingstoke on 23 December 2000

Most conversions in a match — 9

Penzance & Newlyn at home to North Walsham on 16 December 2000

Most penalties in a match — 6 (x7)

Launceston away to Tabard on 11 November 2000
Clifton away to Launceston on 2 December 2000
Weston-super-Mare away to Reading on 2 December 2000
North Walsham at home to Launceston on 9 December 2000
Clifton at home to Penzance & Newlyn on 9 December 2000
Reading at home to Redruth on 10 March 2001
Barking at home to Westcombe Park on 14 April 2001

Most drop goals in a match — 2 (x2)

Plymouth Albion at home to North Walsham on 28 October 2000
Redruth at home to Plymouth on 18 November 2000

=== Player ===
Most points in a match — 31 (x2)

(Fiji) Nat Saumi for Penzance & Newlyn away to Tabard on 6 January 2001
(Fiji) Nat Saumi for Penzance & Newlyn at home to Cheltenham on 10 February 2001

Most tries in a match — 4 (x3)

(England) Matt Bradshaw for Launceston at home to Cheltenham on 30 September 2000
(England) Richard Newton for Penzance & Newlyn away to Tabard on 6 January 2001
(Fiji) Nat Saumi for Penzance & Newlyn at home to Cheltenham on 10 February 2001

Most conversions in a match — 9

(Fiji) Nat Saumi for Penzance & Newlyn at home to North Walsham on 16 December 2000

Most penalties in a match — 6 (x7)

(England) Danny Sloman for Launceston away to Tabard on 11 November 2000
(England) Jon Martin for Clifton away to Launceston on 2 December 2000
(England) Neil Coleman for Weston-super-Mare away to Reading on 2 December 2000
(England) Phil Friel for North Walsham at home to Launceston on 9 December 2000
(England) Jon Martin for Clifton at home to Penzance & Newlyn on 9 December 2000
(England) Matt Senior for Reading at home to Redruth on 10 March 2001
(England) Billy Murphy for Barking at home to Westcombe Park on 14 April 2001

Most drop goals in a match — 2

(England) Tom Barlow for Plymouth Albion at home to North Walsham on 28 October 2000
(England) Bede Brown for Redruth at home to Plymouth on 18 November 2000

=== Attendances ===
Highest — 3,000

Plymouth Albion at home to Launceston on 31 March 2001

Lowest — 100

Tabard at home to Reading on 25 November 2000

Highest Average Attendance — 1,281

Plymouth Albion

Lowest Average Attendance — 168

Clifton

== See also ==
- 2000–01 Premiership Rugby
- 2000–01 National Division One
- 2000–01 National Division Two
- 2000–01 National Division Three North
