= 2001–02 National Division Three South =

Rugby union competition in England

- Countries: England
- Champions: Penzance & Newlyn
- Runners-up: Launceston (also promoted)
- Relegated: Cinderford, Clifton
- Attendance: 48,859 (average 388 per match) (Note: Note that 56 home attendances are missing (see below) - so the total attendance will not be 100% accurate. The average attendance has also been taken into account with the missing games not included.)
- Highest attendance: 3,000; Penzance & Newlyn v Launceston; 26 January 2002
- Lowest attendance: 100 (multiple teams)
- Top point scorer: (Fiji) Nat Saumi (Penzance & Newlyn); 374 points
- Top try scorer: (England) Richard Newton (Penzance & Newlyn); 28 tries

The 2001–02 National Division Three South was the second season (fifteenth overall) of the fourth division (south) of the English domestic rugby union competition using the name National Division Three South. New teams to the division included Lydney and Camberley who were relegated from the 2000–01 National Division Two while promoted teams included Old Colfeians and Old Patesians, champions of London Division 1 and South West Division 1 respectively. The league system was 2 points for a win and 1 point for a draw with the league champions going straight up into National Division Two and the runners up playing a playoff against the runners up from National Division Three North for the final promotion place.

Two Cornish teams dominated the division this season, with Penzance & Newlyn finishing 1 point ahead of Launceston to win the league title. Launceston, as runners up, found themselves in a similar position to that of the previous year, where they needed to win a playoff against the runners up of the 2001–02 National Division Three North. This time the Polson Bridge side were successful, beating Dudley Kingswinford 26 – 0 to clinch promotion and join Penzance & Newlyn in the 2002–03 National Division Two. At the opposite end of the table Cinderford and Clifton would be the two teams to be relegated with both sides dropping to South West Division 1.

== Participating teams and locations ==
Locations of the 2001-02 National Division Three South teams
Greater London National Division Three South clubs

Team	Stadium	Capacity	City/Area
Barking	Goresbrook	1,000	Becontree, Dagenham, London
Blackheath	Rectory Field	3,500 (500 seats)	Blackheath, London
Camberley	Watchetts Recreation Ground		Camberley, Surrey
Cinderford	Dockham Road	2,500	Cinderford, Gloucestershire
Clifton	Station Road	2,200 (200 seats)	Clifton, Bristol
Launceston	Polson Bridge	3,000	Launceston, Cornwall
Lydney	Regentsholme	3,000 (340 seats)	Lydney, Gloucestershire
North Walsham	Norwich Road	1,200	Scottow, North Walsham, Norfolk
Old Colfeians	Horn Park		Lee, London
Old Patesians	Everest Road		Cheltenham, Gloucestershire
Penzance & Newlyn	Mennaye Field	3,500	Penzance, Cornwall
Redruth	Recreation Ground	3,500 (580 seats)	Redruth, Cornwall
Tabard	Cobden Hill		Radlett, Hertfordshire
Westcombe Park	Goddington Dene	3,200	Orpington, London

== Final league table ==
2001–02 National Division Three South table
Pos	Team	Pld	W	D	L	PF	PA	PD	Pts
1	Penzance & Newlyn (C, P)	26	24	1	1	1158	423	+735	49
2	Launceston (P)	26	24	0	2	876	397	+479	48
3	North Walsham	26	18	1	7	631	396	+235	37
4	Westcombe Park	26	15	0	11	631	544	+87	30
5	Old Patesians	26	15	0	11	600	684	−84	30
6	Lydney	26	13	0	13	513	520	−7	26
7	Blackheath	26	11	3	12	538	476	+62	25
8	Redruth	26	12	0	14	629	737	−108	24
9	Tabard	26	10	1	15	509	710	−201	21
10	Barking	26	8	1	17	408	624	−216	17
11	Old Colfeians	26	8	1	17	554	841	−287	17
12	Camberley	26	8	0	18	422	629	−207	16
13	Clifton (R)	26	6	0	20	469	698	−229	12
14	Cinderford (R)	26	6	0	20	390	649	−259	12

Updated to match(es) played on 13 April 2002. Source: englandrugby.com
(C) Champions; (P) Promoted; (R) Relegated

== Results ==
=== Round 1 ===
1 September 2001

Camberley	12 - 9	Redruth
	Report

Watchetts Recreation Ground
Attendance: 250
Referee: Rowan Kitt

1 September 2001

Launceston	23 - 16	North Walsham
	Report

Polson Bridge

1 September 2001

Lydney	20 - 12	Cinderford
	Report

Regentsholme
Referee: Nick Williams

1 September 2001

Old Patesians	19 - 15	Clifton
	Report

Everest Road

1 September 2001

Penzance & Newlyn	58 - 15	Blackheath
	Report

Mennaye Field
Attendance: 900
Referee: Steve Harland

1 September 2001

Tabard	14 - 21	Barking
	Report

Cobden Hill
Referee: Mark Rose

1 September 2001

Westcombe Park	26 - 22	Old Colfeians
	Report

Goddington Dene
Attendance: 450
Referee: Sean Davey

=== Round 2 ===
8 September 2001

Barking	30 - 11	Old Patesians
	Report

Goresbrook
Referee: Sean Davey

8 September 2001

Blackheath	5 - 9	Launceston
	Report

Rectory Field
Referee: D May

8 September 2001

Clifton	21 - 48	Penzance & Newlyn
	Report

Station Road
Attendance: 210

8 September 2001

North Walsham	57 - 10	Old Colfeians
	Report

Norwich Road
Referee: Paul Dickens

8 September 2001

Redruth	28 - 6	Cinderford
	Report

The Recreation Ground
Attendance: 800
Referee: Steve Harland

8 September 2001

Tabard	24 - 22	Lydney
	Report

Cobden Hill
Attendance: 150
Referee: Andrew Tong

8 September 2001

Westcombe Park	11 - 13	Camberley
	Report

Goddington Dene
Attendance: 200

=== Round 3 ===
22 September 2001

Camberley	11 - 21	North Walsham
	Report

Watchetts Recreation Ground

22 September 2001

Cinderford	21 - 30	Westcombe Park
	Report

Dockham Road
Attendance: 300

22 September 2001

Launceston	39 - 5	Clifton
	Report

Polson Bridge
Attendance: 350

22 September 2001

Lydney	33 - 17	Redruth
	Report

Regentsholme
Attendance: 521
Referee: Richard Parker-Sedgmore

22 September 2001

Old Colfeians	17 - 28	Blackheath
	Report

Horn Park
Referee: Stuart Berry

22 September 2001

Old Patesians	38 - 24	Tabard
	Report

Everest Road
Attendance: 200
Referee: Steve Harland

22 September 2001

Penzance & Newlyn	54 - 10	Barking
	Report

Mennaye Field
Attendance: 950
Referee: Nick Williams

=== Round 4 ===
6 October 2001

Barking	19 - 27	Launceston
	Report

Goresbrook

6 October 2001

Blackheath	22 - 10	Camberley
	Report

Rectory Field
Attendance: 200
Referee: Andrew Tong

6 October 2001

Clifton	27 - 39	Old Colfeians
	Report

Station Road
Attendance: 200
Referee: D May

6 October 2001

North Walsham	85 - 5	Cinderford
	Report

Norwich Road
Attendance: 200

6 October 2001

Old Patesians	15 - 21	Lydney
	Report

Everest Road
Attendance: 300
Referee: Stuart Berry

6 October 2001

Tabard	33 - 45	Penzance & Newlyn
	Report

Cobden Hill
Attendance: 185
Referee: Rowan Kitt

6 October 2001

Westcombe Park	42 - 18	Redruth
	Report

Goddington Dene
Attendance: 100
Referee: Alan Biggs

=== Round 5 ===
20 October 2001

Camberley	13 - 22	Clifton
	Report

Watchetts Recreation Ground

20 October 2001

Cinderford	14 - 25	Blackheath
	Report

Dockham Road

20 October 2001

Launceston	40 - 15	Tabard
	Report

Polson Bridge
Attendance: 250
Referee: Sean Davey

20 October 2001

Lydney	23 - 18	Westcombe Park
	Report

Regentsholme
Attendance: 397
Referee: Huw Jones-Williams

20 October 2001

Old Colfeians	12 - 32	Barking
	Report

Horn Park
Referee: Steve Harland

20 October 2001

Penzance & Newlyn	73 - 10	Old Patesians
	Report

Mennaye Field
Attendance: 700

20 October 2001

Redruth	19 - 26	North Walsham
	Report

The Recreation Ground

=== Round 6 ===
27 October 2001

Barking	28 - 27	Camberley
	Report

Goresbrook
Referee: Guy Steel Bodger

27 October 2001

Blackheath	15 - 20	Redruth
	Report

Rectory Field

27 October 2001

Clifton	21 - 14	Cinderford
	Report

Station Road

27 October 2001

North Walsham	14 - 11	Westcombe Park
	Report

Norwich Road

27 October 2001

Old Patesians	22 - 34	Launceston
	Report

Everest Road
Referee: D May

27 October 2001

Penzance & Newlyn	34 - 14	Lydney
	Report

Mennaye Field
Attendance: 900
Referee: Richard Parker-Sedgemore

27 October 2001

Tabard	26 - 26	Old Colfeians
	Report

Cobden Hill
Attendance: 200
Referee: David Rose

=== Round 7 ===
3 November 2001

Camberley	32 - 27	Tabard
	Report

Watchetts Recreation Ground
Attendance: 200
Referee: D May

3 November 2001

Cinderford	8 - 0	Barking
	Report

Dockham Road
Referee: Mike Hamlin

3 November 2001

Launceston	17 - 30	Penzance & Newlyn
	Report

Polson Bridge
Attendance: 2,000
Referee: Alan Biggs

3 November 2001

Lydney	15 - 14	North Walsham
	Report

Regentsholme
Attendance: 407
Referee: Guy Steel Bodger

3 November 2001

Old Colfeians	15 - 23	Old Patesians
	Report

Horn Park
Attendance: 150
Referee: Paul Dickens

3 November 2001

Redruth	24 - 17	Clifton
	Report

The Recreation Ground
Attendance: 600
Referee: Steve Harland

3 November 2001

Westcombe Park	25 - 10	Blackheath
	Report

Goddington Dene
Attendance: 1,000
Referee: Richard Parker-Sedgemore

=== Round 8 ===
10 November 2001

Barking	35 - 31	Redruth
	Report

Goresbrook

10 November 2001

Blackheath	23 - 23	North Walsham
	Report

Rectory Field

10 November 2001

Clifton	16 - 23	Westcombe Park
	Report

Station Road
Referee: D May

10 November 2001

Launceston	21 - 13	Lydney
	Report

Polson Bridge

10 November 2001

Old Patesians	28 - 25	Camberley
	Report

Everest Road
Attendance: 100

10 November 2001

Penzance & Newlyn	62 - 7	Old Colfeians
	Report

Mennaye Field

10 November 2001

Tabard	48 - 8	Cinderford
	Report

Cobden Hill

=== Round 9 ===
17 November 2001

Camberley	20 - 23	Penzance & Newlyn
	Report

Watchetts Recreation Ground
Attendance: 250
Referee: Steve Harland

17 November 2001

Cinderford	13 - 3	Old Patesians
	Report

Dockham Road
Attendance: 400
Referee: Mick Reid

17 November 2001

Lydney	22 - 13	Blackheath
	Report

Regentsholme

17 November 2001

North Walsham	23 - 7	Clifton
	Report

Norwich Road
Attendance: 250

17 November 2001

Old Colfeians	18 - 23	Launceston
	Report

Horn Park

17 November 2001

Redruth	49 - 10	Tabard
	Report

The Recreation Ground

17 November 2001

Westcombe Park	28 - 5	Barking
	Report

Goddington Dene
Attendance: 250

=== Round 10 ===
24 November 2001

Barking	12 - 20	North Walsham
	Report

Goresbrook
Referee: Alan Biggs

24 November 2001

Clifton	10 - 19	Blackheath
	Report

Station Road
Referee: Rowan Kitt

24 November 2001

Launceston	29 - 18	Camberley
	Report

Polson Bridge

24 November 2001

Old Colfeians	26 - 9	Lydney
	Report

Horn Park
Attendance: 100
Referee: Steve Harland

24 November 2001

Old Patesians	59 - 35	Redruth
	Report

Everest Road
Attendance: 300
Referee: Guy Steel Bodger

24 November 2001

Penzance & Newlyn	27 - 10	Cinderford
	Report

Mennaye Field
Attendance: 600

24 November 2001

Tabard	18 - 35	Westcombe Park
	Report

Cobden Hill
Attendance: 120
Referee: Huw Jones-Williams

=== Round 11 ===
1 December 2001

Barking	13 - 16	Tabard
	Report

Goresbrook

1 December 2001

Blackheath	17 - 17	Penzance & Newlyn
	Report

Rectory Field

1 December 2001

Cinderford	13 - 16	Lydney
	Report

Dockham Road

1 December 2001

Clifton	15 - 18	Old Patesians
	Report

Station Road

1 December 2001

North Walsham	13 - 21	Launceston
	Report

Norwich Road
Attendance: 400
Referee: Rowan Kitt

1 December 2001

Old Colfeians	10 - 28	Westcombe Park
	Report

Horn Park

1 December 2001

Redruth	23 - 13	Camberley
	Report

The Recreation Ground
Attendance: 600

=== Round 12 ===
8 December 2001

Barking	35 - 30	Clifton
	Report

Goresbrook

8 December 2001

Camberley	29 - 14	Lydney
	Report

Watchetts Recreation Ground

8 December 2001

Launceston	33 - 29	Redruth
	Report

Polson Bridge
Attendance: 1,200

8 December 2001

Old Colfeians	37 - 18	Cinderford
	Report

Horn Park

8 December 2001

Old Patesians	38 - 12	North Walsham
	Report

Everest Road
Referee: Richard Parker-Sedgmore

8 December 2001

Penzance & Newlyn	32 - 7	Westcombe Park
	Report

Mennaye Field
Attendance: 900
Referee: Alan Biggs

8 December 2001

Tabard	16 - 13	Blackheath
	Report

Cobden Hill
Attendance: 200

=== Round 13 ===
15 December 2001

Blackheath	46 - 14	Old Patesians
	Report

Rectory Field
Attendance: 300

15 December 2001

Cinderford	35 - 15	Camberley
	Report

Dockham Road
Referee: Steve Harland

15 December 2001

Clifton	31 - 23	Tabard
	Report

Station Road

15 December 2001

Lydney	15 - 3	Barking
	Report

Regentsholme
Attendance: 326
Referee: D May

15 December 2001

North Walsham	18 - 7	Penzance & Newlyn
	Report

Norwich Road
Attendance: 400
Referee: Nick Williams

15 December 2001

Redruth	48 - 34	Old Colfeians
	Report

The Recreation Ground
Attendance: 720
Referee: Huw Jones-Williams

15 December 2001

Westcombe Park	16 - 32	Launceston
	Report

Goddington Dene
Attendance: 200
Referee: Guy Steel Bodger

=== Round 14 ===
22 December 2001

Barking	19 - 19	Blackheath
	Report

Goresbrook
Attendance: 300
Referee: Paul Dickens

22 December 2001

Clifton	28 - 20	Lydney
	Report

Station Road
Attendance: 180
Referee: Steve Harland

22 December 2001

Launceston	39 - 23	Cinderford
	Report

Polson Bridge
Attendance: 450
Referee: Andrew Pearce

22 December 2001

Old Colfeians	23 - 21	Camberley
	Report

Horn Park
Referee: David Sainsbury

22 December 2001

Old Patesians	31 - 30	Westcombe Park
	Report

Everest Road
Referee: David Rose

22 December 2001

Penzance & Newlyn	38 - 22	Redruth
	Report

Mennaye Field
Attendance: 1,600
Referee: Nigel Higginson

22 December 2001

Tabard	22 - 21	North Wilsham
	Report

Cobden Hill
Attendance: 200
Referee: Paul Dix

=== Round 15 ===
5 January 2002

Redruth	28 - 29	Old Patesians
	Report

The Recreation Ground
Attendance: 650

5 January 2002

Blackheath	P - P	Clifton

- Postponed. Game rescheduled to 16 February 2002.

5 January 2002

Camberley	P - P	Launceston

- Postponed. Game rescheduled to 16 February 2002.

5 January 2002

Cinderford	P - P	Penzance & Newlyn

- Postponed. Game rescheduled to 16 February 2002.

5 January 2002

Lydney	P - P	Old Colfeians

- Postponed. Game rescheduled to 16 February 2002.

5 January 2002

North Walsham	P - P	Barking

- Postponed. Game rescheduled to 16 February 2002.

5 January 2002

Westcombe Park	P - P	Tabard

- Postponed. Game rescheduled to 16 February 2002.

=== Round 16 ===
12 January 2002

Barking	23 - 21	Westcombe Park
	Report

Goresbrook

12 January 2002

Blackheath	21 - 13	Lydney
	Report

Rectory Field

12 January 2002

Clifton	36 - 21	North Walsham
	Report

Station Road

12 January 2002

Launceston	57 - 12	Old Colfeians
	Report

Polson Bridge
Attendance: 420

12 January 2002

Old Patesians	34 - 5	Cinderford
	Report

Everest Road
Referee: Mark Rose

12 January 2002

Penzance & Newlyn	52 - 7	Camberley
	Report

Mennaye Field
Attendance: 850
Referee: Huw Jones-Williams

12 January 2002

Tabard	19 - 20	Redruth
	Report

Cobden Hill

=== Round 17 ===
19 January 2002

Camberley	13 - 15	Old Patesians
	Report

Watchetts Recreation Ground
Attendance: 150
Referee: Paul Dickens

19 January 2002

Cinderford	30 - 7	Tabard
	Report

Dockham Road

19 January 2002

Lydney	3 - 30	Launceston
	Report

Regentsholme
Attendance: 526
Referee: Chris Seeley

19 January 2002

North Walsham	14 - 5	Blackheath
	Report

Norwich Road
Attendance: 300

19 January 2002

Old Colfeians	19 - 56	Penzance & Newlyn
	Report

Horn Park
Attendance: 225
Referee: Guy Steel Bodger

19 January 2002

Redruth	27 - 3	Barking
	Report

The Recreation Ground
Attendance: 700
Referee: Andrew Pearce

19 January 2002

Westcombe Park	33 - 24	Clifton
	Report

Goddington Dene

=== Round 18 ===
26 January 2002

Barking	0 - 15	Cinderford
	Report

Goresbrook
Referee: Andrew Canning

26 January 2002

Blackheath	18 - 22	Westcombe Park
	Report

Rectory Field
Attendance: 250
Referee: Rob Sawyer

26 January 2002

North Walsham	18 - 0	Lydney
	Report

Norwich Road
Attendance: 250
Referee: Andrew Vertigan

26 January 2002

Penzance & Newlyn	32 - 8	Launceston

Mennaye Field
Attendance: 3,000
Referee: Paul Dix

26 January 2002

Tabard	19 - 9	Camberley
	Report

Cobden Hill
Attendance: 150
Referee: Rowan Kitt

26 January 2002

Clifton	P - P	Redruth

- Postponed. Game rescheduled to 2 March 2002.

26 January 2002

Old Patesians	P - P	Old Colfeians

- Postponed. Game rescheduled to 2 March 2002.

=== Round 19 ===
2 February 2002

Camberley	23 - 15	Barking
	Report

Watchetts Recreation Ground
Attendance: 150
Referee: David Sainsbury

2 February 2002

Old Colfeians	6 - 29	Tabard
	Report

Horn Park
Attendance: 125
Referee: Sean Davey

2 February 2002

Redruth	24 - 20	Blackheath
	Report

The Recreation Ground
Attendance: 500
Referee: Steve Harland

2 February 2002

Westcombe Park	13 - 32	North Walsham
	Report

Goddington Dene
Attendance: 250

2 February 2002

Cinderford	P - P	Clifton

- Postponed. Game rescheduled to 23 March 2002.

2 February 2002

Launceston	P - P	Old Patesians

- Postponed. Game rescheduled to 23 March 2002.

2 February 2002

Lydney	P - P	Penzance & Newlyn

- Postponed. Game rescheduled to 2 March 2002.

=== Round 20 ===
9 February 2002

Barking	29 - 19	Old Colfeians
	Report

Goresbrook
Attendance: 300

9 February 2002

Blackheath	37 - 10	Cinderford
	Report

Rectory Field

9 February 2002

Clifton	11 - 19	Camberley
	Report

Station Road
Attendance: 100

9 February 2002

North Walsham	23 - 3	Redruth
	Report

Norwich Road
Attendance: 300
Referee: Rowan Kitt

9 February 2002

Old Patesians	20 - 26	Penzance & Newlyn
	Report

Everest Road

9 February 2002

Tabard	9 - 24	Launceston
	Report

Cobden Hill

9 February 2002

Westcombe Park	39 - 16	Lydney
	Report

Goddington Dene
Attendance: 300

=== Round 15 (rescheduled games) ===
16 February 2002

Blackheath	21 - 10	Clifton
	Report

Rectory Field
Referee: Paul Dickens

- Game rescheduled from 5 January 2002.

16 February 2002

Camberley	16 - 38	Launceston
	Report

Watchetts Recreation Ground
Attendance: 100
Referee: Alan Biggs

- Game rescheduled from 5 January 2002.

16 February 2002

Cinderford	19 - 32	Penzance & Newlyn
	Report

Dockham Road
Attendance: 200

- Game rescheduled from 5 January 2002.

16 February 2002

North Walsham	17 - 6	Barking
	Report

Norwich Road

- Game rescheduled from 5 January 2002.

16 February 2002

Lydney	56 - 9	Old Colfeians
	Report

Regentsholme
Attendance: 227

- Game rescheduled from 5 January 2002.

16 February 2002

Westcombe Park	38 - 13	Tabard

Goddington Dene
Attendance: 150

- Game rescheduled from 5 January 2002.

=== Round 21 ===
23 February 2002

Camberley	14 - 10	Blackheath
	Report

Watchetts Recreation Ground

23 February 2002

Cinderford	7 - 8	North Walsham
	Report

Dockham Road
Referee: Steve Harland

23 February 2002

Launceston	74 - 7	Barking
	Report

Polson Bridge

23 February 2002

Lydney	11 - 15	Old Patesians
	Report

Regentsholme
Attendance: 365

23 February 2002

Old Colfeians	21 - 18	Clifton
	Report

Horn Park
Attendance: 225
Referee: Paul Dickens

23 February 2002

Penzance & Newlyn	76 - 11	Tabard
	Report

Mennaye Field
Attendance: 800
Referee: Huw Jones-Williams

23 February 2002

Redruth	19 - 10	Westcombe Park
	Report

The Recreation Ground
Attendance: 600

=== Rounds 18 & 19 (rescheduled games) ===
2 March 2002

Clifton	33 - 34	Redruth
	Report

Station Road
Attendance: 100
Referee: Steve Haarland

- Game rescheduled from 26 January 2002.

2 March 2002

Lydney	28 - 41	Penzance & Newlyn
	Report

Regentsholme
Attendance: 378
Referee: Nigel Higginson

- Game rescheduled from 2 February 2002.

2 March 2002

Old Patesians	51 - 31	Old Colfeians
	Report

Everest Road
Attendance: 200
Referee: D May

- Game rescheduled from 26 January 2002.

=== Round 22 ===
9 March 2002

Barking	10 - 37	Penzance & Newlyn
	Report

Goresbrook

9 March 2002

Blackheath	36 - 14	Old Colfeians
	Report

Rectory Field
Referee: 450

9 March 2002

Clifton	10 - 24	Launceston
	Report

Station Road
Attendance: 150

9 March 2002

North Walsham	48 - 0	Camberley
	Report

Norwich Road
Attendance: 300
Referee: Mark Rose

9 March 2002

Redruth	22 - 24	Lydney
	Report

The Recreation Ground
Attendance: 800

9 March 2002

Tabard	22 - 13	Old Patesians
	Report

Cobden Hill
Attendance: 200

9 March 2002

Westcombe Park	20 - 8	Cinderford
	Report

Goddington Dene
Attendance: 150

=== Round 23 ===
16 March 2002

Camberley	15 - 19	Westcombe Park
	Report

Watchetts Recreation Ground
Attendance: 150
Referee: Tim Beddow

16 March 2002

Cinderford	20 - 21	Redruth
	Report

Dockham Road
Attendance: 300

16 March 2002

Launceston	35 - 19	Blackheath
	Report

Polson Bridge
Attendance: 450
Referee: Andrew Pearce

16 March 2002

Lydney	19 - 30	Tabard
	Report

Regentsholme
Attendance: 467

16 March 2002

Old Colfeians	10 - 19	North Walsham
	Report

Horn Park
Attendance: 175
Referee: Revis Phillips

16 March 2002

Old Patesians	28 - 12	Barking
	Report

Everest Road
Attendance: 300
Referee: Dean Richards

16 March 2002

Penzance & Newlyn	76 - 24	Clifton
	Report

Mennaye Field

=== Round 19 (rescheduled games) ===
23 March 2002

Cinderford	34 - 10	Clifton
	Report

Dockham Road
Referee: Nick Williams

- Game rescheduled from 2 February 2002.

23 March 2002

Launceston	54 - 3	Old Patesians
	Report

Polson Bridge
Attendance: 400
Referee: Steve Harland

- Game rescheduled from 2 February 2002.

=== Round 24 ===
30 March 2002

Blackheath	19 - 16	Barking
	Report

Rectory Field
Attendance: 350
Referee: Rowan Kitt

30 March 2002

Camberley	26 - 30	Old Colfeians
	Report

Watchetts Recreation Ground
Referee: Steve Brown

30 March 2002

Cinderford	15 - 40	Launceston
	Report

Dockham Road
Attendance: 200
Referee: Mark Rose

30 March 2002

Lydney	25 - 8	Clifton
	Report

Regentsholme
Attendance: 301
Referee: R Steggall

30 March 2002

North Walsham	34 - 7	Tabard
	Report

Norwich Road
Attendance: 250
Referee: Guy Steel Bodger

30 March 2002

Redruth	22 - 76	Penzance & Newlyn
	Report

The Recreation Ground
Attendance: 2,000
Referee: Sean Davey

30 March 2002

Westcombe Park	45 - 15	Old Patesians
	Report

Goddington Dene
Attendance: 250
Referee: G O'Hara

=== Round 25 ===
6 April 2002

Barking	13 - 17	Lydney
	Report

Goresbrook
Referee: Marcelo Pilara

6 April 2002

Camberley	14 - 13	Cinderford
	Report

Watchetts Recreation Ground
Attendance: 200
Referee: Nick Cousins

6 April 2002

Launceston	43 - 14	Westcombe Park
	Report

Polson Bridge

6 April 2002

Old Colfeians	44 - 22	Redruth
	Report

Horn Park
Attendance: 155
Referee: Andrew Canning

6 April 2002

Old Patesians	23 - 21	Blackheath
	Report

Everest Road
Attendance: 400
Referee: Andrew Pearce

6 April 2002

Penzance & Newlyn	64 - 7	North Walsham
	Report

Mennaye Field
Attendance: 1,200
Referee: Nigel Higginson

6 April 2002

Tabard	22 - 6	Clifton
	Report

Cobden Hill
Attendance: 225
Referee: Paul Dickens

=== Round 26 ===
13 April 2002

Blackheath	41 - 7	Tabard
	Report

Rectory Field
Referee: A Malpass

13 April 2002

Cinderford	14 - 32	Old Colfeians
	Report

Dockham Road
Attendance: 125
Referee: Huw Jones-Williams

13 April 2002

Clifton	14 - 11	Barking
	Report

Station Road
Referee: Dean Richards

13 April 2002

Lydney	44 - 7	Camberley
	Report

Regentsholme
Attendance: 304
Referee: R Steggall

13 April 2002

North Walsham	27 - 21	Old Patesians
	Report

Norwich Road
Attendance: 250
Referee: Steve Walters

13 April 2002

Redruth	15 - 62	Launceston
	Report

The Recreation Ground
Attendance: 1,200
Referee: Richard Parker-Sedgemore

13 April 2002

Westcombe Park	27 - 42	Penzance & Newlyn
	Report

Goddington Dene
Attendance: 700
Referee: Paul Dix

=== Promotion play-off ===
The league runners up of National Division Three South and North would meet in a playoff game for promotion to National Division Two. Launceston were runners-up in the south and because they had a better league record than north runners-up, Dudley Kingswinford, they hosted the play-off match.

27 April 2002

Launceston	26 - 0	Dudley Kingswinford
	Report

Polson Bridge
Attendance: 2,500
Referee: Alan Biggs

== Total season attendances ==
- Not including promotion playoff.

Club	Home Games	Total	Average	Highest	Lowest	% Capacity
Barking	2 (Note: Missing home attendances v Old Patesians on 8 September 2001, Launceston on 6 October 2001, Camberley on 27 October 2001, Redruth on 10 November 2001, North Walsham on 24 November 2001, Tabard on 1 December 2001, Clifton on 8 December 2001, Westcombe Park on 12 January 2002, Cinderford on 26 January 2002, Penzance & Newlyn in March 2002 and Lydney on 6 April 2002.)	600	300	300	300	30%
Blackheath	5 (Note: Missing home attendances v Launceston on 8 September 2001, Redruth on 27 October 2001, North Walsham on 10 November 2001, Penzance & Newlyn on 1 December 2001, Lydney on 12 January 2002, Cinderford on 9 February 2002, Clifton on 16 February 2002 and Tabard on 13 April 2002.)	1,550	310	450	200	9%
Camberley	8 (Note: Missing home attendances v North Walsham on 22 September 2001, Clifton on 20 October 2001, Lydney on 8 December 2001, Blackheath on 23 February 2002 and Old Colfeians on 30 March 2002.)	1,450	181	250	100	
Cinderford	6 (Note: Missing home attendances v Blackheath on 20 October 2001, Barking on 3 November 2001, Lydney on 1 December 2001, Camberley on 15 December 2001, Tabard on 19 January 2002, North Walsham on 23 February 2002 and Clifton on 23 March 2002.)	1,525	254	400	125	10%
Clifton	6 (Note: Missing home attendances v Cinderford on 27 October 2001, Redruth on 10 November 2001, Blackheath on 24 November 2001, Old Patesians on 1 December 2001, Tabard on 15 December 2001, North Walsham on 12 January 2002 and Barking on 13 April 2002.)	940	157	210	100	7%
Launceston	8 (Note: Missing home attendances v North Walsham on 1 September 2001, Lydney on 10 November 2001, Camberley on 24 November 2001, Barking on 23 February 2002 and Westcombe Park on 6 April 2002.)	5,520	690	2,000	250	23%
Lydney	11 (Note: Missing home attendances v Cinderford on 1 September 2001 and Blackheath on 17 November 2001.)	4,219	384	526	227	13%
North Walsham	10 (Note: Missing home attendances v Old Colfeians on 8 September 2001, Westcombe Park on 27 October 2001 and Barking on 16 February 2002.)	2,900	290	400	200	24%
Old Colfeians	7 (Note: Missing home attendances v Blackheath on 22 September 2001, Barking on 20 October 2001, Launceston on 17 November 2001, Westcombe Park on 1 December 2001, Cinderford on 9 December 2001 and Camberley on 22 December 2001.)	1,155	165	225	100	
Old Patesians	7 (Note: Missing home attendances v Clifton on 1 September 2001, Launceston on 27 October 2001, North Walsham on 8 December 2001, Westcombe Park on 22 December 2001, Cinderford on 12 January 2002 and Penzance & Newlyn on 9 February 2002.)	1,800	257	400	100	
Penzance & Newlyn	11 (Note: Missing home attendances v Old Colfeians on 10 November 2001 and Clifton on 16 March 2002.)	12,400	1,127	3,000	600	32%
Redruth	9 (Note: Missing home attendances v North Walsham on 20 October 2001 and Tabard on 17 November 2001.)	9,170	834	2,000	500	24%
Tabard	9 (Note: Missing home attendances v Barking on 1 September 2001, Cinderford on 10 November 2001, Redruth on 12 January 2002 and Launceston on 9 February 2002.)	1,630	181	225	120	
Westcombe Park	12 (Note: Missing home attendance v Clifton on 19 January 2002.)	4,000	333	1,000	100	10%

== Individual statistics ==
- Note that points scorers includes tries as well as conversions, penalties and drop goals.

=== Top points scorers ===
Rank	Player	Team	Appearances	Points
1	(Fiji) Nat Saumi	Penzance & Newlyn	24	374
2	(England) Derek Coates	Westcombe Park	26	326
3	(England) Matthew Townsend	Westcombe Park	25	248
4	(England) Steve Larkins	Redruth	22	217
5	(England) Micky Skinner	Tabard	26	203
6	(South Africa) Barend Vorster	Launceston	20	191
7	(England) Danny Sloman	Launceston	17	176
8	(England) Richard Newton	Penzance & Newlyn	25	140
9	(England) John Barnes	Clifton	15	126
10	(England) Len Wilmot	North Walsham	11	125
10	(England) Mark Roberts	Cinderford	23	125

=== Top try scorers ===
Rank	Player	Team	Appearances	Tries
1	(England) Richard Newton	Penzance & Newlyn	25	28
2	(Fiji) Laka Waqanivere	Penzance & Newlyn	24	23
2	(Zimbabwe) Victor Olonga	Penzance & Newlyn	25	23
3	(Samoa) Mark Fatialofa	Launceston	21	20
4	(England) Mark Richards	Penzance & Newlyn	19	17
5	(England) Andy Thorpe	North Walsham	16	16
5	(South Africa) Barend Vorster	Launceston	20	16
6	(Fiji) Nat Saumi	Penzance & Newlyn	24	15
7	(England) Will Morgan	Old Patesians	24	13
7	(England) Chris Randall	Clifton	25	13

== Season records ==
=== Team ===
Largest home win — 80 pts

85 - 5 North Walsham at home to Cinderford on 6 October 2001

Largest away win — 37 pts

56 - 19 Penzance & Newyln away to Old Colfeians on 19 January 2002

Most points scored — 85 pts

85 - 5 North Walsham at home to Cinderford on 6 October 2001

Most tries in a match — 14

North Walsham at home to Cinderford on 6 October 2001

Most conversions in a match — 9 (x3)

Penzance & Newlyn at home to Old Patesians on 20 October 2001
Penzance & Newlyn at home to Clifton on 16 March 2002
Penzance & Newlyn away to Redruth on 30 March 2002

Most penalties in a match — 6 (x5)

Launceston at home to North Walsham on 1 September 2001
Camberley at home to Tabard on 3 November 2001
Barking at home to Redruth on 10 November 2001
North Walsham away to Blackheath on 10 November 2001
Barking at home to Westcombe Park on 12 January 2002

Most drop goals in a match — 2

Lydney at home to Redruth on 22 September 2001

=== Player ===
Most points in a match — 34

(Fiji) Nat Saumi Penzance & Newlyn at home to Barking on 22 September 2001

Most tries in a match — 4 (x4)

(England) Andy Thorpe for North Walsham at home to Cinderford on 6 October 2001
(England) Richard Newton for Penzance & Newlyn at home to Old Colfeians on 10 November 2001
(Zimbabwe) Victor Olonga for Penzance & Newlyn at home to Tabard on 23 February 2002
(Samoa) Mark Fatialofa for Launceston at home to Old Patesians on 23 March 2002

Most conversions in a match — 9 (x3)

(Fiji) Nat Saumi for Penzance & Newlyn at home to Old Patesians on 20 October 2001
(Fiji) Nat Saumi for Penzance & Newlyn at home to Clifton on 16 March 2002
(Fiji) Nat Saumi for Penzance & Newlyn away to Redruth on 30 March 2002

Most penalties in a match — 6 (x5)

(England) Danny Sloman for Launceston at home to North Walsham on 1 September 2001
(England) Stephen Webb for Camberley at home to Tabard on 3 November 2001
(England) David Gilmore for Barking at home to Redruth on 10 November 2001
(England) John Dwight for North Walsham away to Blackheath on 10 November 2001
(England) Justin Azzopardi for Barking at home to Westcombe Park on 12 January 2002

Most drop goals in a match — 2

(England) Neil Merrett for Lydney at home to Redruth on 22 September 2001

=== Attendances ===
Highest — 3,000

Penzance & Newlyn at home to Launceston on 26 January 2002

Lowest — 100 (x6)

Westcombe Park at home to Redruth on 6 October 2001
Old Patesians at home to Camberley on 10 November 2001
Old Colfeians at home to Lydney on 24 November 2001
Clifton at home to Camberley on 9 February 2002
Camberley at home to Launceston on 16 February 2002
Clifton at home to Redruth on 2 March 2002

Highest Average Attendance — 1,127

Penzance & Newlyn

Lowest Average Attendance — 157

Clifton

== See also ==
- English rugby union system
- Rugby union in England
