= Derek Coates =

- Born: 18 February 1972 (age 54)

Rugby union career
- Position: Full back
Senior career
Years	Team	Apps	(Points)
1998–99, 2003–05	Blackheath	34	(429)
2000–03	Westcombe Park	76	(840)
- Correct as of 30 April 2005

Derek Coates (born 1972) is an English rugby union player who played at Full back. He is known for his spells with Blackheath and Westcombe Park, where thanks to his prowess with the boot he became one of the most prolific points scorers in National League 2 South history with over 1,000 points spread between the two clubs, and was also one of the most consistent scorers averaging 12 points a game. Since he has retired from playing he has remained in the game as a coach.

== Career ==
=== Westcombe Park ===
In 2000 Derek moved across London from former club, Blackheath, to Westcombe Park in Orpington, then playing in National Division 3 South. While he had found opportunities limited at Blackheath, he became a first team fixture during his debut season at Goddington Dene, playing 22 games and scoring 222 points, as he helped Westcombe Park finish 7th, two places higher than his former club. The 2001–02 season was even more successful for Derek as he played every league game and scored 326 points, second in the division only to Penzance & Newlyn's Nat Saumi, helping Westcombe Park to a 4th-placed finish. He would also win silverware at the end of the year, as his side won the Kent Cup 41–21 against Thanet Wanderers, at the final held at Blackheath's Rectory Field. The 2002–03 season would be Derek's last with Westcombe Park, as his side struggled in the league. Despite playing in a team that finished 1 point off the relegation spot, Derek continued to be prolific with 267 points (3rd overall in the division).

=== Blackheath ===
After 3 years with Westcombe Park, Derek moved back to the Rectory Field to sign for Blackheath at the start of the 2003–04 season. This would prove to be the best season of his career as he helped Blackheath to win the National Division 3 South title (the first league title in the club's history), while at the same time scoring a personal best 368 points to finish as the division's top scorer. The 2004–05 season would see Blackheath survive in National Division Two but would be the last for Derek as he only managed a handful of games. Since retiring from playing, Derek has been involved in coaching, with spells in change of Blackheath Heathen's (Blackheath's second team) and more recently, Weavering Warriors.

== Season-by-season playing stats ==
Season	Club	Competition	Appearances	Tries	Drop Goals	Conversions	Penalties	Total Points
1998–99	Blackheath	Allied Dunbar Premiership 2	4	0	0	0	0	0
2000–01	Westcombe Park	National Division 3 South	22	1	2	33	46	222
2001–02	Westcombe Park	National Division 3 South	26	6	0	52	64	326
2002–03	Westcombe Park	National Division 3 South	26	7	0	41	50	267
2002–03	Westcombe Park	Powergen Cup	2	1	0	4	4	25
2003–04	Blackheath	National Division 3 South	25	2	0	62	78	368
2003–04	Blackheath	Powergen Cup	2	0	0	3	8	30
2004–05	Blackheath	National Division 2	3	0	0	2	9	31

== Honours and records ==
Blackheath

- National Division 3 South champions: 2003–04
- National Division 3 South top points scorer: 2003–04 (368 points)

Westcombe Park

- Kent Cup winners: 2002
