= 2003–04 National Division Three North =

Rugby union competition in England

- Countries: England
- Champions: Waterloo
- Runners-up: Halifax
- Relegated: Longton, Liverpool St Helens, Preston Grasshoppers
- Attendance: N/A (Note: Due to extremely poor coverage and reporting by the media for this season there is not enough attendance data for the league to give an accurate figure.)
- Top point scorer: (England) Anthony Birley (New Brighton); 316 points
- Top try scorer: (England) Neil Kerfoot (Waterloo); 23 tries

The 2003–04 National Division Three North was the fourth season (sixteenth overall) of the fourth division (north) of the English domestic rugby union competition using the name National Division Three North. New teams to the division included Fylde and Kendal who were relegated from the 2002–03 National Division Two while promoted teams included Longton who came up as champions of Midlands Division 1 while Darlington (champions) and Macclesfield (playoffs) came up from North Division 1. The league system was 2 points for a win and 1 point for a draw with the promotion system changing for this season with a playoff system being introduced. The champions of both National Division Three North and National Division Three South would automatically go up but the runners up of these two divisions would meet each other in a one off match (at the home ground of the side with the superior league record) to see who would claim the third and final promotion place to National Division Two for the following season.

After two seasons spent in the division Waterloo would pip Halifax to the title by the narrowest of margins finishing dead level on points but going up to the 2004–05 National Division Two by virtue of a massively better for and against record. Halifax would suffer a double disappointment by missing out on their second stab at promotion as they lost narrowly at home to 2003–04 National Division Three South runners up Launceston in the promotion playoff. Relegated teams included newly promoted Longton (who gained only 4 points all season), Liverpool St Helens and Preston Grasshoppers. Longton would drop back down to Midlands Division 1 while Liverpool St Helens and Preston Grasshoppers would fall to North Division 1.

== Participating teams and locations ==
Locations of the 2003-04 National Division Three North teams

Team	Stadium	Capacity	City/Area
Blaydon	Crow Trees	2,000 (400 seats)	Swalwell, Tyne and Wear
Darlington	Blackwell Meadows	3,000	Darlington, County Durham
Darlington Mowden Park	Yiewsley Drive		Darlington, County Durham
Dudley Kingswinford	Heathbrook	2,260	Kingswinford, Dudley, West Midlands
Fylde	Woodlands Memorial Ground	7,500 (500 seats)	Lytham St. Annes, Lancashire
Halifax	Ovenden Park		Halifax, West Yorkshire
Kendal	Mint Bridge	4,600 (600 seats)	Kendal, Cumbria
Liverpool St Helens	Moss Lane	4,370 (370 seats)	St Helens, Merseyside
Longton	Trentham Fields		Trentham, Stoke-on-Trent, Staffordshire
Macclesfield	Priory Park	1,250 (250 seats)	Macclesfield, Cheshire
New Brighton	Hartsfield	2,000	Wirral, Merseyside
Preston Grasshoppers	Lightfoot Green	2,250 (250 seats)	Preston, Lancashire
Tynedale	Tynedale Park	2,000 (400 seats)	Corbridge, Northumberland
Waterloo	St Anthony's Road	9,950 (950 seats)	Blundellsands, Merseyside

== Final league table ==
2003–04 National Division Three North table
Pos	Team	Pld	W	D	L	PF	PA	PD	Pts	Qualification
1	Waterloo (C)	26	25	0	1	979	343	+636	50	Promoted
2	Halifax	26	25	0	1	755	405	+350	50	Promotion play-off
3	Darlington Mowden Park	26	16	0	10	602	439	+163	32	
4	Blaydon	26	14	1	11	587	434	+153	29	
5	New Brighton	26	14	1	11	583	499	+84	29	
6	Fylde	26	14	0	12	529	531	−2	28	
7	Tynedale (Note: Tynedale's game away to Longton would be cancelled due to fixture congestion.)	25	12	0	13	462	407	+55	24	
8	Darlington	26	11	1	14	511	569	−58	23	
9	Kendal	26	11	1	14	417	681	−264	23	
10	Macclesfield	26	10	2	14	507	642	−135	22	
11	Dudley Kingswinford	26	10	1	15	482	655	−173	21	
12	Preston Grasshoppers (R)	26	7	0	19	443	754	−311	14	Relegated
13	Liverpool St Helens (R)	26	5	3	18	461	612	−151	13	Relegated
14	Longton (Note: Longton's home game against Tynedale would be cancelled due to fixture congestion.) (R)	25	1	2	22	300	647	−347	4	Relegated

Updated to match(es) played on 08-05-2004. Source: Rugby Statbunker
(C) Champions; (R) Relegated

== Results ==
=== Round 1 ===
13 September 2003

Darlington	26 - 43	Waterloo
	Report

Blackwell Meadows
Referee: Steve Harland

13 September 2003

Darlington Mowden Park	8 - 34	Blaydon
	Report

Yiewsley Drive
Referee: Andrew Gardner

13 September 2003

Fylde	16 - 17	Tynedale
	Report

Woodlands Memorial Ground
Referee: Brendan Fitzmaurice

13 September 2003

Halifax	36 - 17	Dudley Kingswinford
	Report

Ovenden Park
Referee: S Makinson

13 September 2003

Liverpool St Helens	35 - 15	Kendal
	Report

Moss Lane
Referee: Rob Sawyer

13 September 2003

Longton	6 - 28	Macclesfield
	Report

Trentham Fields
Referee: Alan Hughes

13 September 2003

New Brighton	33 - 31	Preston Grasshoppers
	Report

Hartsfield
Referee: Andrew Vertigan

=== Round 2 ===
27 September 2003

Blaydon	41 - 6	Fylde
	Report

Crow Trees
Referee: Ged Stone

27 September 2003

Darlington Mowden Park	28 - 17	Darlington
	Report

Yiewsley Drive
Referee: Alan Hughes

27 September 2003

Dudley Kingswinford	22 - 38	Waterloo
	Report

Heathbrook
Referee: Dale Newitt

27 September 2003

Kendal	30 - 26	New Brighton
	Report

Mint Bridge
Referee: Llyr Apgeraint-Roberts

27 September 2003

Macclesfield	21 - 32	Halifax
	Report

Priory Park
Referee: Richard Draper

27 September 2003

Preston Grasshoppers	26 - 8	Longton
	Report

Lightfoot Green
Referee: Brendan Fitzmaurice

27 September 2003

Tynedale	47 - 12	Liverpool St Helens
	Report

Tynedale Park
Referee: Andrew Vertigan

=== Round 3 ===
11 October 2003

Darlington	24 - 45	Dudley Kingswinford
	Report

Blackwell Meadows
Referee: Mike Hamlin

11 October 2003

Fylde	24 - 20	Darlington Mowden Park
	Report

Woodlands Memorial Ground
Referee: S Makinson

11 October 2003

Halifax	29 - 25	Preston Grasshoppers
	Report

Ovenden Park
Referee: Andrew Vertigan

11 October 2003

Liverpool St Helens	18 - 18	Blaydon
	Report

Moss Lane
Referee: Rob Sawyer

11 October 2003

Longton	11 - 12	Kendal
	Report

Trentham Fields
Referee: David Drury

11 October 2003

New Brighton	28 - 20	Tynedale
	Report

Hartsfield
Referee: Mick Reid

11 October 2003

Waterloo	68 - 13	Macclesfield
	Report

St Anthony's Road
Referee: Andrew Vertigan

=== Round 4 ===
18 October 2003

Blaydon	17 - 16	New Brighton
	Report

Crow Trees
Referee: Brendan Fitzmaurice

18 October 2003

Darlington Mowden Park	18 - 13	Liverpool St Helens
	Report

Yiewsley Drive
Referee: Guy Steel Bodger

18 October 2003

Kendal	18 - 20	Halifax
	Report

Mint Bridge
Referee: Dale Newitt

18 October 2003

Macclesfield	37 - 20	Dudley Kingswinford
	Report

Priory Park
Referee: Rhys Davies

18 October 2003

Tynedale	34 - 20	Longton
	Report

Tynedale Park
Referee: Ged Stone

18 October 2003

Fylde	P - P	Darlington

- Postponed. Game rescheduled to 21 February 2004.

18 October 2003

Preston Grasshoppers	P - P	Waterloo

- Postponed. Game rescheduled to 21 February 2004.

=== Round 5 ===
25 October 2003

Darlington	22 - 6	Macclesfield
	Report

Blackwell Meadows
Referee: Mike Hamlin

25 October 2003

Dudley Kingswinford	22 - 20	Preston Grasshoppers
	Report

Heathbrook
Referee: Brendan Fitzmaurice

25 October 2003

Halifax	32 - 22	Tynedale
	Report

Ovenden Park
Referee: Richard Draper

25 October 2003

Liverpool St Helens	19 - 24	Fylde
	Report

Moss Lane

25 October 2003

Longton	20 - 27	Blaydon
	Report

Trentham Fields
Referee: Mick Reid

25 October 2003

New Brighton	17 - 12	Darlington Mowden Park
	Report

Hartsfield
Referee: G O'Hara

25 October 2003

Waterloo	43 - 15	Kendal
	Report

St Anthony's Road
Referee: Alan Hughes

=== Round 6 ===
1 November 2003

Blaydon	20 - 25	Halifax
	Report

Crow Trees
Referee: S Makinson

1 November 2003

Darlington Mowden Park	28 - 10	Longton
	Report

Yiewsley Drive
Referee: Brendan Fitzmaurice

1 November 2003

Fylde	16 - 23	New Brighton
	Report

Woodlands Memorial Ground
Referee: Mike Hamlin

1 November 2003

Kendal	32 - 7	Dudley Kingswinford
	Report

Mint Bridge
Referee: Andrew Gardner

1 November 2003

Liverpool St Helens	34 - 10	Darlington
	Report

Moss Lane
Referee: Paul Dickens

1 November 2003

Preston Grasshoppers	24 - 22	Macclesfield
	Report

Lightfoot Green
Referee: Guy Steel Bodger

1 November 2003

Tynedale	P - P	Waterloo

- Postponed. Game rescheduled to 6 March 2004.

=== Round 7 ===
8 November 2003

Darlington	23 - 17	Preston Grasshoppers
	Report

Blackwell Meadows
Referee: Andrew Vertigan

8 November 2003

Dudley Kingswinford	19 - 32	Tynedale
	Report

Heathbrook
Referee: Paul Dickens

8 November 2003

Halifax	25 - 14	Darlington Mowden Park
	Report

Ovenden Park
Referee: Ged Stone

8 November 2003

Longton	15 - 9	Fylde
	Report

Trentham Fields
Referee: Richard Phillips

8 November 2003

Macclesfield	15 - 13	Kendal
	Report

Priory Park
Referee: Eric Darriere

8 November 2003

New Brighton	14 - 12	Liverpool St Helens
	Report

Hartsfield
Referee: D Edmunds

8 November 2003

Waterloo	35 - 22	Blaydon
	Report

St Anthony's Road
Referee: Dale Newitt

=== Round 8 ===
15 November 2003

Blaydon	53 - 7	Dudley Kingswinford
	Report

Crow Trees
Referee: David Drury

15 November 2003

Darlington Mowden Park	14 - 19	Waterloo
	Report

Yiewsley Drive
Referee: Paul Dickens

15 November 2003

Fylde	20 - 33	Halifax
	Report

Woodlands Memorial Ground
Referee: Terry Hall

15 November 2003

Kendal	34 - 31	Preston Grasshoppers
	Report

Mint Bridge
Referee: Mick Reid

15 November 2003

Liverpool St Helens	20 - 16	Longton
	Report

Moss Lane

15 November 2003

New Brighton	46 - 33	Darlington
	Report

Hartsfield
Referee: Andrew Gardner

15 November 2003

Tynedale	21 - 25	Macclesfield
	Report

Tynedale Park
Referee: Ged Stone

=== Round 9 ===
22 November 2003

Darlington	27 - 10	Kendal
	Report

Blackwell Meadows
Referee: S Makinson

22 November 2003

Dudley Kingswinford	16 - 25	Darlington Mowden Park
	Report

Heathbrook
Referee: Mick Reid

22 November 2003

Halifax	40 - 30	Liverpool St Helens
	Report

Ovenden Park
Referee: Richard Phillips

22 November 2003

Longton	8 - 19	New Brighton
	Report

Trentham Fields
Referee: Rhys Davies

22 November 2003

Macclesfield	25 - 11	Blaydon
	Report

Priory Park
Referee: Terry Hall

22 November 2003

Preston Grasshoppers	14 - 16	Tynedale
	Report

Lightfoot Green
Referee: Andrew Gardner

22 November 2003

Waterloo	45 - 19	Fylde
	Report

St Anthony's Road
Referee: Guy Steel Bodger

=== Round 10 ===
29 November 2003

Blaydon	48 - 7	Preston Grasshoppers
	Report

Crow Trees
Referee: David Pearson

29 November 2003

Darlington Mowden Park	30 - 0	Macclesfield
	Report

Yiewsley Drive
Referee: Rhys Davies

29 November 2003

Fylde	36 - 10	Dudley Kingswinford
	Report

Woodlands Memorial Ground
Referee: Andrew Vertigan

29 November 2003

Liverpool St Helens	23 - 31	Waterloo
	Report

Moss Lane

29 November 2003

Longton	10 - 10	Darlington
	Report

Trentham Fields
Referee: JP Doyle

29 November 2003

New Brighton	7 - 15	Halifax
	Report

Hartsfield
Attendance: 450
Referee: Alan Hughes

29 November 2003

Tynedale	5 - 10	Kendal
	Report

Tynedale Park
Referee: Brendan Fitzmaurice

=== Round 11 ===
6 December 2003

Darlington	19 - 12	Tynedale
	Report

Blackwell Meadows
Referee: Andrew Vertigan

6 December 2003

Dudley Kingswinford	18 - 17	Liverpool St Helens
	Report

Heathbrook
Referee: Mark Varnon

6 December 2003

Halifax	58 - 23	Longton
	Report

Ovenden Park
Referee: S Makinson

6 December 2003

Kendal	20 - 18	Blaydon
	Report

Mint Bridge

6 December 2003

Macclesfield	26 - 23	Fylde
	Report

Priory Park
Referee: S Makinson

6 December 2003

Preston Grasshoppers	28 - 35	Darlington Mowden Park
	Report

Lightfoot Green
Referee: Ged Stone

6 December 2003

Waterloo	39 - 17	New Brighton
	Report

St Anthony's Road
Referee: Dean Richards

=== Round 12 ===
13 December 2003

Blaydon	15 - 23	Tynedale
	Report

Crow Trees
Referee: Alan Hughes

13 December 2003

Darlington Mowden Park	60 - 8	Kendal
	Report

Yiewsley Drive
Referee: Mick Reid

13 December 2003

Fylde	24 - 15	Preston Grasshoppers
	Report

Woodlands Memorial Ground
Referee: Brendan Fitzmaurice

13 December 2003

Halifax	47 - 14	Darlington
	Report

Ovenden Park
Referee: Ged Stone

13 December 2003

Liverpool St Helens	34 - 23	Macclesfield
	Report

Moss Lane

13 December 2003

New Brighton	39 - 18	Dudley Kingswinford
	Report

Hartsfield
Referee: S Makinson

13 December 2003

Longton	P - P	Waterloo

- Postponed. Game rescheduled to 24 April 2004.

=== Round 13 ===
20 December 2003

Darlington	23 - 7	Blaydon
	Report

Blackwell Meadows
Referee: Rob Sawyer

20 December 2003

Dudley Kingswinford	33 - 15	Longton
	Report

Heathbrook
Referee: Mike Hamlin

20 December 2003

Kendal	6 - 10	Fylde
	Report

Mint Bridge
Referee: Alan Hughes

20 December 2003

Macclesfield	16 - 16	New Brighton
	Report

Priory Park
Referee: Ged Stone

20 December 2003

Preston Grasshoppers	14 - 5	Liverpool St Helens
	Report

Lightfoot Green
Referee: Mick Reid

20 December 2003

Tynedale	13 - 14	Darlington Mowden Park
	Report

Tynedale Park
Referee: David Drury

20 December 2003

Waterloo	18 - 6	Halifax
	Report

St Anthony's Road
Referee: Andrew Vertigan

=== Round 14 ===
3 January 2004

Blaydon	37 - 3	Kendal
	Report

Crow Trees
Referee: Andrew Gardner

3 January 2004

Darlington Mowden Park	44 - 0	Preston Grasshoppers
	Report

Yiewsley Drive
Referee: D Edmunds

3 January 2004

Fylde	38 - 20	Macclesfield
	Report

Woodlands Memorial Ground
Referee: Andrew Vertigan

3 January 2004

Liverpool St Helens	6 - 6	Dudley Kingswinford
	Report

Moss Lane

3 January 2004

Longton	12 - 20	Halifax
	Report

Trentham Fields
Referee: David Drury

3 January 2004

New Brighton	23 - 34	Waterloo
	Report

Hartsfield
Referee: Gareth Copsey

3 January 2004

Tynedale	19 - 3	Darlington
	Report

Tynedale Park
Attendance: 150
Referee: Brendan Fitzmaurice

=== Round 15 ===
10 January 2004

Darlington	27 - 3	Longton
	Report

Blackwell Meadows
Referee: Mick Reid

10 January 2004

Dudley Kingswinford	17 - 15	Fylde
	Report

Heathbrook
Referee: Andrew Gardner

10 January 2004

Halifax	29 - 15	New Brighton
	Report

Ovenden Park
Referee: Paul Dix

10 January 2004

Kendal	15 - 3	Tynedale
	Report

Mint Bridge
Referee: S Makinson

10 January 2004

Macclesfield	5 - 11	Darlington Mowden Park
	Report

Priory Park
Referee: Richard Draper

10 January 2004

Preston Grasshoppers	13 - 41	Blaydon
	Report

Lightfoot Green
Referee: Alan Hughes

10 January 2004

Waterloo	24 - 0	Liverpool St Helens
	Report

St Anthony's Road
Referee: Dale Newitt

=== Round 16 ===
17 January 2004

Blaydon	25 - 12	Macclesfield
	Report

Crow Trees
Attendance: 150
Referee: Andrew Gardner

17 January 2004

Darlington Mowden Park	23 - 3	Dudley Kingswinford
	Report

Yiewsley Drive
Referee: Mick Reid

17 January 2004

Fylde	3 - 53	Waterloo
	Report

Woodlands Memorial Ground
Referee: Richard Parker-Sedgmore

17 January 2004

Kendal	28 - 3	Darlington
	Report

Mint Bridge
Attendance: 280
Referee: David Drury

17 January 2004

Liverpool St Helens	29 - 33	Halifax
	Report

Moss Lane

17 January 2004

New Brighton	10 - 8	Longton
	Report

Hartsfield
Referee: Ged Stone

17 January 2004

Tynedale	24 - 0	Preston Grasshoppers
	Report

Tynedale Park
Referee: Paul Dickens

=== Round 17 ===
24 January 2004

Darlington	23 - 17	New Brighton
	Report

Blackwell Meadows

24 January 2004

Dudley Kingswinford	18 - 3	Blaydon
	Report

Heathbrook
Referee: S Makinson

24 January 2004

Halifax	32 - 12	Fylde
	Report

Ovenden Park
Referee: Mick Reid

24 January 2004

Macclesfield	26 - 17	Tynedale
	Report

Priory Park
Referee: Rhys Davies

24 January 2004

Preston Grasshoppers	15 - 22	Kendal
	Report

Lightfoot Green
Referee: Ged Stone

24 January 2004

Waterloo	35 - 12	Darlington Mowden Park
	Report

St Anthony's Road
Referee: Alan Hughes

24 January 2004

Longton	P - P	Liverpool St Helens

- Postponed. Game rescheduled to 21 February 2004.

=== Round 18 ===
31 January 2004

Fylde	29 - 8	Longton
	Report

Woodlands Memorial Ground
Referee: Rhys Davies

31 January 2004

Liverpool St Helens	3 - 20	New Brighton
	Report

Moss Lane

31 January 2004

Preston Grasshoppers	22 - 20	Darlington
	Report

Lightfoot Green
Referee: Andrew Vertigan

31 January 2004

Tynedale	22 - 10	Dudley Kingswinford
	Report

Tynedale Park
Referee: David Drury

31 January 2004

Blaydon	P - P	Waterloo

- Postponed. Game rescheduled to 1 May 2004.

31 January 2004

Darlington Mowden Park	P - P	Halifax

- Postponed. Game rescheduled to 21 February 2004.

31 January 2004

Kendal	P - P	Macclesfield

- Postponed. Game rescheduled to 21 February 2004.

=== Round 19 ===
7 February 2004

Darlington	30 - 10	Liverpool St Helens
	Report

Blackwell Meadows
Referee: S Makinson

7 February 2004

Dudley Kingswinford	35 - 14	Kendal
	Report

Heathbrook
Referee: Dale Newitt

7 February 2004

Halifax	15 - 3	Blaydon
	Report

Ovenden Park
Referee: Bruce Robertson

7 February 2004

Longton	10 - 32	Darlington Mowden Park
	Report

Trentham Fields
Referee: Ged Stone

7 February 2004

Macclesfield	40 - 24	Preston Grasshoppers
	Report

Priory Park
Referee: Andrew Gardner

7 February 2004

New Brighton	15 - 18	Fylde
	Report

Hartsfield
Referee: Brendan Fitzmaurice

7 February 2004

Waterloo	11 - 3	Tynedale
	Report

St Anthony's Road
Referee: Chris Sharp

=== Round 20 ===
14 February 2004

Blaydon	29 - 10	Longton
	Report

Crow Trees
Referee: Ged Stone

14 February 2004

Darlington Mowden Park	23 - 25	New Brighton
	Report

Yiewsley Drive
Referee: Mick Reid

14 February 2004

Fylde	21 - 10	Liverpool St Helens
	Report

Woodlands Memorial Ground
Referee: David Drury

14 February 2004

Kendal	3 - 45	Waterloo
	Report

Mint Bridge
Referee: Alan Hughes

14 February 2004

Macclesfield	10 - 20	Darlington
	Report

Priory Park
Referee: Chris Seeley

14 February 2004

Preston Grasshoppers	18 - 10	Dudley Kingswinford
	Report

Lightfoot Green
Referee: Rob Sawyer

14 February 2004

Tynedale	3 - 14	Halifax
	Report

Tynedale Park
Referee: Brendan Fitzmaurice

=== Rounds 4, 17 & 18 (rescheduled games) ===
21 February 2004

Darlington Mowden Park	10 - 25	Halifax
	Report

Yiewsley Drive
Referee: Guy Steel Bodger

- Game rescheduled from 31 January 2004.

21 February 2004

Fylde	26 - 23	Darlington
	Report

Woodlands Memorial Ground
Attendance: 400
Referee: Chris Sharp

- Game rescheduled from 18 October 2003.

21 February 2004

Kendal	30 - 30	Macclesfield
	Report

Mint Bridge
Attendance: 350
Referee: Mick Reid

- Game rescheduled from 31 January 2004.

21 February 2004

Longton	34 - 34	Liverpool St Helens
	Report

Trentham Fields
Referee: Richard Parker-Sedgmore

- Game rescheduled from 24 January 2004.

21 February 2004

Preston Grasshoppers	7 - 49	Waterloo
	Report

Lightfoot Green
Referee: Brendan Fitzmaurice

- Game rescheduled from 18 October 2003.

=== Round 21 ===
28 February 2004

Darlington	23 - 28	Fylde
	Report

Blackwell Meadows
Referee: Ged Stone

28 February 2004

Dudley Kingswinford	34 - 17	Macclesfield
	Report

Heathbrook
Referee: Dean Richards

28 February 2004

New Brighton	13 - 17	Blaydon
	Report

Hartsfield
Referee: Dale Newitt

28 February 2004

Waterloo	91 - 5	Preston Grasshoppers
	Report

St Anthony's Road
Referee: Greg Garner

28 February 2004

Halifax	P - P	Kendal

- Postponed. Game rescheduled to 6 March 2004.

28 February 2004

Liverpool St Helens	P - P	Darlington Mowden Park

- Postponed. Game rescheduled to 27 March 2004.

28 February 2004

Longton	C - C	Tynedale

- Game would initially be postponed but due to fixture congestion it would ultimately be cancelled.

=== Rounds 6 & 21 (rescheduled games) ===
6 March 2004

Halifax	54 - 13	Kendal
	Report

Ovenden Park
Referee: Richard Parker-Sedgmore

- Game rescheduled from 28 February 2004.

6 March 2004

Tynedale	13 - 18	Waterloo
	Report

Tynedale Park
Referee: Alan Hughes

- Game rescheduled from 1 November 2003.

=== Round 22 ===
13 March 2004

Blaydon	18 - 19	Liverpool St Helens
	Report

Crow Trees
Referee: Mike Hamlin

13 March 2004

Darlington Mowden Park	20 - 15	Fylde
	Report

Yiewsley Drive
Referee: Brendan Fitzmaurice

13 March 2004

Dudley Kingswinford	20 - 35	Darlington
	Report

Heathbrook
Referee: Marcus Anderson

13 March 2004

Kendal	20 -15	Longton
	Report

Mint Bridge
Referee: Ian Robinson

13 March 2004

Macclesfield	20 - 27	Waterloo
	Report

Priory Park
Referee: Matthew Daubney

13 March 2004

Preston Grasshoppers	10 - 29	Halifax
	Report

Lightfoot Green
Referee: David Drury

13 March 2004

Tynedale	20 - 16	New Brighton
	Report

Tynedale Park
Referee: Andrew Gardner

=== Round 23 ===
20 March 2004

Darlington	17 - 10	Darlington Mowden Park
	Report

Blackwell Meadows
Attendance: 450
Referee: Andrew Vertigan

20 March 2004

Fylde	6 - 15	Blaydon
	Report

Woodlands Memorial Ground
Referee: Marcus Anderson

20 March 2004

Halifax	28 - 0	Macclesfield
	Report

Ovenden Park
Referee: Alan Hughes

20 March 2004

Liverpool St Helens	10 - 24	Tynedale
	Report

Moss Lane

20 March 2004

Longton	10 - 27	Preston Grasshoppers
	Report

Trentham Fields
Referee: Brendan Fitzmaurice

20 March 2004

New Brighton	35 - 5	Kendal
	Report

Hartsfield
Referee: David Drury

20 March 2004

Waterloo	43 - 12	Dudley Kingswinford
	Report

St Anthony's Road
Referee: Des Headington

=== Round 21 (rescheduled game) ===
27 March 2004

Liverpool St Helens	19 - 24	Darlington Mowden Park
	Report

Moss Lane
Referee: Matthew Daubney

- Game rescheduled from 28 February 2004.

=== Round 24 ===
3 April 2004

Blaydon	26 - 14	Darlington Mowden Park
	Report

Crow Trees
Attendance: 150
Referee: Andrew Gardner

3 April 2004

Dudley Kingswinford	17 - 25	Halifax
	Report

Heathbrook
Referee: Darryl Chapman

3 April 2004

Kendal	23 - 22	Liverpool St Helens
	Report

Mint Bridge
Referee: Rhys Davies

3 April 2004

Macclesfield	22 - 17	Longton
	Report

Priory Park
Referee: David Drury

3 April 2004

Preston Grasshoppers	19 - 24	New Brighton
	Report

Lightfoot Green
Referee: Fred Copstake

3 April 2004

Tynedale	10 - 23	Fylde
	Report

Tynedale Park
Referee: Ged Stone

3 April 2004

Waterloo	26 - 15	Darlington
	Report

St Anthony's Road
Referee: Mick Reid

=== Round 25 ===
10 April 2004

Blaydon	16 - 12	Darlington
	Report

Crow Trees
Attendance: 120
Referee: Alan Hughes

10 April 2004

Darlington Mowden Park	34 - 20	Tynedale
	Report

Yiewsley Drive
Referee: S Makinson

10 April 2004

Fylde	40 - 3	Kendal
	Report

Woodlands Memorial Ground
Referee: Rob Sawyer

10 April 2004

Halifax	24 - 20	Waterloo
	Report

Ovenden Park
Attendance: 1,500
Referee: Tim Wigglesworth

10 April 2004

Liverpool St Helens	13 - 9	Preston Grasshoppers
	Report

Moss Lane

10 April 2004

Longton	8 - 13	Dudley Kingswinford
	Report

Trentham Fields
Referee: Paul Dickens

10 April 2004

New Brighton	37 - 0	Macclesfield
	Report

Hartsfield
Referee: Ed Turnill

=== Round 26 ===
17 April 2004

Darlington	12 - 29	Halifax
	Report

Blackwell Meadows
Referee: Brendan Fitzmaurice

17 April 2004

Dudley Kingswinford	33 - 22	New Brighton
	Report

Heathbrook
Referee: Stuart Parker

17 April 2004

Kendal	15 - 39	Darlington Mowden Park
	Report

Mint Bridge
Referee: D Edmunds

17 April 2004

Macclesfield	48 - 14	Liverpool St Helens
	Report

Priory Park
Referee: Paul Dickens

17 April 2004

Preston Grasshoppers	12 - 28	Fylde
	Report

Lightfoot Green
Referee: Rhys Davies

17 April 2004

Waterloo	P - P	Longton

- Postponed. Game rescheduled to 8 May 2004.

18 April 2004

Tynedale	22 - 3	Blaydon
	Report

Tynedale Park
Referee: Guy Steel Bodger

=== Round 12 (rescheduled game) ===
24 April 2004

Longton	0 - 58	Waterloo
	Report

Trentham Fields
Referee: S Makinson

- Game rescheduled from 13 December 2003.

=== Round 18 (rescheduled game) ===
1 May 2004

Blaydon	23 - 44	Waterloo
	Report

Crow Trees
Referee: Chris Sharp

- Game rescheduled from 31 January 2004.

=== Round 26 (rescheduled game) ===
1 May 2004

Waterloo	22 - 3	Longton
	Report

St Anthony's Road
Referee: Paul Dickens

- Game rescheduled from 17 April 2004.

=== Promotion play-off ===
The league runners up of National Division Three South and North would meet in a playoff game for promotion to National Division Two. Halifax were the northern divisions runners up and as they had a superior league record than southern runners-up, Launceston, they hosted the play-off match.

15 May 2004

Halifax	16 - 18	Launceston
	Report

Ovenden Park
Referee: Alan Biggs

== Total season attendances ==
Club	Home Games	Total	Average	Highest	Lowest	% Capacity
Blaydon	3	420	140	150	120	7%
Darlington	1	450	450	450	450	15%
Darlington Mowden Park	0	0	0	0	0	
Dudley Kingswinford	0	0	0	0	0	0%
Fylde	1	400	400	400	400	5%
Halifax	1	1,500	1,500	1,500	1,500	
Kendal	2	630	315	350	280	7%
Liverpool St Helens	0	0	0	0	0	0%
Longton	0	0	0	0	0	
Macclesfield	0	0	0	0	0	0%
New Brighton	1	450	450	450	450	23%
Preston Grasshoppers	0	0	0	0	0	0%
Tynedale	1	150	150	150	150	8%
Waterloo	0	0	0	0	0	0%

== Individual statistics ==
- Note that points scorers includes tries as well as conversions, penalties and drop goals.

=== Top points scorers ===
Rank	Player	Team	Appearances	Points
1	(England) Anthony Birley	New Brighton	26	316
2	(England) Mike Scott	Fylde	26	289
3	(England) Tony Handley	Waterloo	25	269
4	(Samoa) Douglas Sanft	Halifax	25	266
5	(England) Gary Bell	Macclesfield	25	229
6	(England) David Dalrymple	Blaydon	17	166
7	(England) Phillip Belgian	Tynedale	16	159
7	(England) Mark Butler	Darlington	24	159
8	(England) Simon Worsley	Liverpool St Helens	25	149
9	(England) Mark Bedworth	Darlington Mowden Park	21	135

=== Top try scorers ===
Rank	Player	Team	Appearances	Tries
1	(England) Neil Kerfoot	Waterloo	26	23
2	(England) Ian Gowland	Dudley Kingswinford	24	21
2	(South Africa) Jan Van Deventer	Waterloo	26	21
3	(England) Oliver Viney	Preston Grasshoppers	25	16
4	(England) Dave Cunliffe	Liverpool St Helens	25	14
5	(England) Iain Dixon	Darlington Mowden Park	22	13
5	(England) Andrew Foreman	Darlington Mowden Park	25	13
5	(England) Aaron Canning	Halifax	26	13
6	(England) Rob Hitchmough	Waterloo	18	12
6	(Australia) Jamie Bloem	Halifax	25	12
6	(New Zealand) Robert Afoa-Peterson	Halifax	26	12

== Season records ==
=== Team ===
Largest home win — 91 pts

91 - 5 Waterloo at home to Preston Grasshoppers on 28 February 2004

Largest away win — 50 pts

53 - 3 Waterloo away to Fylde on 17 January 2004

Most points scored — 91 pts

91 - 5 Waterloo at home to Preston Grasshoppers on 28 February 2004

Most tries in a match — 14

Waterloo at home to Preston Grasshoppers on 28 February 2004

Most conversions in a match — 9

Waterloo at home to Preston Grasshoppers on 28 February 2004

Most penalties in a match — 7

New Brighton at home to Preston Grasshoppers on 13 September 2003

Most drop goals in a match — 2 (x2)

Longton at home to Fylde on 8 November 2003
Fylde away to Halifax on 24 January 2004

=== Player ===
Most points in a match — 29

(England) Alistair J Murray for Tynedale at home to Longton on 18 October 2003

Most tries in a match — 4

(Australia) Jamie Bloem for Halifax at home to Darlington on 13 December 2003

Most conversions in a match — 9

(England) John Broxson for Waterloo at home to Preston Grasshoppers on 28 February 2004

Most penalties in a match — 7

(England) Anthony Birley for New Brighton at home to Preston Grasshoppers on 13 September 2003

Most drop goals in a match — 2

(England) Mike Scott for Fylde away to Halifax on 24 January 2004

=== Attendances ===
Highest — 1,500 (Note: Note that attendance tracking was very poor this season and there may have been higher attendances that were not recorded.)

Halifax at home to Waterloo on 10 April 2004

Lowest — 120 (Note: Note that attendance tracking was very poor this season and it is likely that there were lower attendances that were not recorded.)

Blaydon at home to Darlington on 10 April 2004

Highest Average Attendance — N/A (Note: Note that attendance tracking was very poor this season and is impossible to give even a slightly accurate figure for the team with the highest average attendance.)
Lowest Average Attendance — N/A (Note: Note that attendance tracking was very poor this season and is impossible to give even a slightly accurate figure for the team with the lowest average attendance.)

== See also ==
- English Rugby Union Leagues
- English rugby union system
- Rugby union in England
