= 2003–04 National Division Three South =

Rugby union competition in England

- Countries: (England)
- Champions: Blackheath
- Runners-up: Launceston (also promoted)
- Relegated: Old Colfeians, Basingstoke
- Attendance: N/A (Note: Due to extremely poor coverage and reporting by the media for this season there is almost no attendance figures.)
- Top point scorer: (England) Derek Coates (Blackheath); 368 points
- Top try scorer: (South Africa) Gert De Kock (Westcombe Park); 19 tries

The 2003–04 National Division Three South was the fourth season (17th overall) of the fourth division (south) of the English domestic rugby union competition using the name National Division Three South. New teams to the division included Launceston who were relegated from the 2002–03 National Division Two while promoted clubs included Southend (champions) and Haywards Heath (playoffs) coming up from London Division 1 and Dings Crusaders as champions of South West Division 1. The league system was 2 points for a win and 1 point for a draw with the league champions going straight up into National Division Two and the runners up playing a playoff against the runners up from National Division Three North for the final promotion place.

The season saw an incredibly tight title race between Blackheath and Launceston. Both sides would finish dead level on 44 points each but Blackheath finished as champions thanks to a better for and against record. Launceston would join the London side in the 2004–05 National Division Two, making an instant return by defeating 2003–04 National Division Three North runners up Halifax in their promotion playoff in what was a very tight game played at the Yorkshire-based club. At the other end of the table the relegation battle was much less close with Old Colfeians and Basingstoke being the two sides to be relegated. Both Old Colfeians and Basingstoke would be demoted to London Division 1 for the next season.

== Participating teams and locations ==
Locations of the 2003-04 National Division Three South teams
Greater London National Division Three South clubs

Team	Stadium	Capacity	City/Area
Barking	Goresbrook	1,000	Becontree, Dagenham, London
Basingstoke	Down Grange	2,500 (250 seats)	Basingstoke, Hampshire
Blackheath	Rectory Field	3,500 (500 seats)	Blackheath, London
Dings Crusaders	Landseer Avenue	1,500	Lockleaze, Bristol
Haywards Heath	Whitemans Green		Cuckfield, Haywards Heath, West Sussex
Launceston	Polson Bridge	3,000	Launceston, Cornwall
North Walsham	Norwich Road	1,200	Scottow, North Walsham, Norfolk
Old Colfeians	Horn Park		Lee, London
Old Patesians	Everest Road		Cheltenham, Gloucestershire
Redruth	Recreation Ground	3,500 (580 seats)	Redruth, Cornwall
Southend	Warners Park	1,500 (150 seats)	Southend, Essex
Tabard	Cobden Hill		Radlett, Hertfordshire
Westcombe Park	Goddington Dene	3,200	Orpington, London
Weston-super-Mare	Recreation Ground	3,000	Weston-super-Mare, Somerset

== Final league table ==
2003–04 National Division Three South table
Pos	Team	Pld	W	D	L	PF	PA	PD	Pts	Qualification
1	Blackheath (C)	26	22	0	4	839	350	+489	44	Promoted
2	Launceston (P)	26	22	0	4	832	371	+461	44	Promotion play-off
3	North Walsham	26	19	0	7	674	435	+239	38	
4	Redruth	26	16	0	10	581	473	+108	32	
5	Barking	26	15	0	11	648	522	+126	30	
6	Southend	26	13	0	13	702	703	−1	26	
7	Old Patesians	26	13	0	13	614	659	−45	26	
8	Weston-super-Mare	26	12	0	14	555	570	−15	24	
9	Westcombe Park	26	11	1	14	639	584	+55	23	
10	Haywards Heath	26	10	0	16	491	578	−87	20	
11	Tabard	26	10	0	16	537	676	−139	20	
12	Dings Crusaders	26	8	1	17	386	624	−238	17	
13	Basingstoke (R)	26	6	0	20	456	940	−484	12	Relegated
14	Old Colfeians (R)	26	4	0	22	469	938	−469	8	Relegated

Updated to match(es) played on 17-04-2004. Source: Rugby Statbunker
(C) Champions; (P) Promoted; (R) Relegated

== Results ==
=== Round 1 ===
13 September 2003

Barking	65 - 13	Basingstoke
	Report

Goresbrook

13 September 2003

Blackheath	36 - 23	Weston-super-Mare
	Report

Rectory Field
Referee: Chris Healey

13 September 2003

Haywards Heath	20 - 22	Tabard
	Report

Whitemans Green
Referee: Mark Varnon

13 September 2003

Old Patesians	37 - 44	Southend
	Report

Everest Road
Referee: Guy Steel Bodger

13 September 2003

North Walsham	44 - 18	Old Colfeians
	Report

Norwich Road
Referee: Dean Richards

13 September 2003

Redruth	32 - 20	Dings Crusaders
	Report

The Recreation Ground
Referee: D May

13 September 2003

Westcombe Park	9 - 25	Launceston
	Report

Goddington Dene
Referee: Kevin Stewart

=== Round 2 ===
27 September 2003

Blackheath	15 - 17	Barking
	Report

Rectory Field
Referee: G O'Hara

27 September 2003

Dings Crusaders	18 - 18	Westcombe Park
	Report

Landseer Avenue
Referee: R Mun-Gavin

27 September 2003

Launceston	36 - 14	Basingstoke
	Report

Polson Bridge
Referee: Chris Healey

27 September 2003

Old Colfeians	38 - 23	Old Patesians
	Report

Horn Park
Referee: Terry Hall

27 September 2003

Southend	20 - 35	Redruth
	Report

Warners Bridge Park
Referee: Mark Varnon

27 September 2003

Tabard	8 - 25	North Walsham
	Report

Cobden Hill
Referee: Richard Phillips

27 September 2003

Weston-super-Mare	22 - 10	Haywards Heath
	Report

Recreation Ground
Referee: Greg Garner

=== Round 3 ===
11 October 2003

Barking	28 - 15	Launceston
	Report

Goresbrook
Referee: Greg Garner

11 October 2003

Basingstoke	26 - 5	Dings Crusaders
	Report

Down Grange
Referee: Dale Newitt

11 October 2003

Haywards Heath	7 - 38	Blackheath
	Report

Whitemans Green
Referee: Richard Phillips

11 October 2003

North Walsham	23 - 7	Weston-super-Mare
	Report

Norwich Road
Referee: Paul Dickens

11 October 2003

Old Patesians	11 - 27	Tabard
	Report

Everest Road
Referee: Guy Steel Bodger

11 October 2003

Redruth	15 - 8	Old Colfeians
	Report

The Recreation Ground
Referee: D May

11 October 2003

Westcombe Park	40 - 13	Southend
	Report

Goddington Dene

=== Round 4 ===
18 October 2003

Blackheath	22 - 17	North Walsham
	Report

Rectory Field
Referee: Mark Varnon

18 October 2003

Haywards Heath	5 - 37	Barking
	Report

Whitemans Green
Referee: D May

18 October 2003

Old Colfeians	18 - 35	Westcombe Park
	Report

Horn Park
Referee: Richard Phillips

18 October 2003

Southend	54 - 17	Basingstoke
	Report

Warners Bridge Park
Referee: G O'Hara

18 October 2003

Tabard	34 - 17	Redruth
	Report

Cobden Hill
Referee: Dean Richards

18 October 2003

Weston-super-Mare	8 - 16	Old Patesians
	Report

Recreation Ground
Referee: Rob Sawyer

18 October 2003

Dings Crusaders	P - P	Launceston

- Postponed. Game rescheduled to 21 February 2004.

=== Round 5 ===
25 October 2003

Barking	25 - 18	Dings Crusaders
	Report

Goresbrook
Referee: Richard Phillips

25 October 2003

Basingstoke	41 - 22	Old Colfeians
	Report

Down Grange
Referee: Greg Garner

25 October 2003

Launceston	55 - 12	Southend
	Report

Polson Bridge
Referee: Steve Harland

25 October 2003

North Walsham	42 - 33	Haywards Heath
	Report

Norwich Road
Referee: Terry Hall

25 October 2003

Old Patesians	8 - 50	Blackheath
	Report

Everest Road
Referee: Kevin Stewart

25 October 2003

Redruth	17 - 21	Weston-super-Mare
	Report

The Recreation Ground
Referee: Rhys Davies

25 October 2003

Westcombe Park	37 - 14	Tabard
	Report

Goddington Dene
Referee: Eric Woodmason

=== Round 6 ===
1 November 2003

Blackheath	40 - 19	Redruth
	Report

Rectory Field
Referee: Greg Garner

1 November 2003

Haywards Heath	43 - 16	Old Patesians
	Report

Whitemans Green
Referee: Richard Parker-Sedgmore

1 November 2003

North Walsham	16 - 6	Barking
	Report

Norwich Road
Referee: Richard Phillips

1 November 2003

Old Colfeians	3 - 32	Launceston
	Report

Horn Park
Referee: Andrew Small

1 November 2003

Southend	44 - 25	Dings Crusaders
	Report

Warners Bridge Park
Referee: Rhys Davies

1 November 2003

Tabard	39 - 15	Basingstoke
	Report

Cobden Hill
Referee: Terry Hall

1 November 2003

Weston-super-Mare	38 - 27	Westcombe Park
	Report

Recreation Ground
Referee: D May

=== Round 7 ===
8 November 2003

Barking	47 - 22	Southend
	Report

Goresbrook
Referee: Greg Garner

8 November 2003

Basingstoke	22 - 25	Weston-super-Mare
	Report

Down Grange
Referee: Steve Harland

8 November 2003

Dings Crusaders	13 - 19	Old Colfeians
	Report

Landseer Avenue
Referee: D May

8 November 2003

Launceston	32 - 7	Tabard
	Report

Polson Bridge

8 November 2003

Old Patesians	27 - 40	North Walsham
	Report

Everest Road
Referee: Rhys Davies

8 November 2003

Redruth	35 - 19	Haywards Heath
	Report

The Recreation Ground
Referee: Kevin Stewart

8 November 2003

Westcombe Park	20 - 18	Blackheath
	Report

Goddington Dene
Referee: G O'Hara

=== Round 8 ===
15 November 2003

Blackheath	50 - 10	Basingstoke
	Report

Rectory Field
Referee: Rhys Davies

15 November 2003

Haywards Heath	34 - 6	Westcombe Park
	Report

Whitemans Green
Referee: Mark Varnon

15 November 2003

North Walsham	24 - 8	Redruth
	Report

Norwich Road

15 November 2003

Old Colfeians	18 - 50	Southend
	Report

Horn Park

15 November 2003

Old Patesians	26 - 31	Barking
	Report

Everest Road
Referee: D May

15 November 2003

Tabard	30 - 34	Dings Crusaders
	Report

Cobden Hill
Referee: Richard Phillips

15 November 2003

Weston-super-Mare	16 - 23	Launceston
	Report

Recreation Ground
Referee: Nigel Higginson

=== Round 9 ===
22 November 2003

Barking	41 - 11	Old Colfeians
	Report

Goresbrook
Referee: Richard Draper

22 November 2003

Basingstoke	7 - 42	Haywards Heath
	Report

Down Grange
Referee: Ged Stone

22 November 2003

Dings Crusaders	26 - 8	Weston-super-Mare
	Report

Landseer Avenue
Referee: Steve Harland

22 November 2003

Launceston	18 - 25	Blackheath
	Report

Polson Bridge
Referee: Mark Varnon

22 November 2003

Redruth	19 - 7	Old Patesians
	Report

The Recreation Ground
Referee: G O'Hara

22 November 2003

Southend	17 - 28	Tabard
	Report

Warners Bridge Park
Referee: Dale Newitt

22 November 2003

Westcombe Park	16 - 28	North Walsham
	Report

Goddington Dene
Referee: Greg Garner

=== Round 10 ===
29 November 2003

Blackheath	25 - 10	Dings Crusaders
	Report

Rectory Field
Referee: David Sainsbury

29 November 2003

Haywards Heath	14 - 18	Launceston
	Report

Whitemans Green
Referee: Nick Williams

29 November 2003

North Walsham	62 - 0	Basingstoke
	Report

Norwich Road

29 November 2003

Old Patesians	35 - 17	Westcombe Park
	Report

Everest Road
Referee: Dale Newitt

29 November 2003

Redruth	22 - 12	Barking
	Report

The Recreation Ground
Referee: Steve Harland

29 November 2003

Tabard	27 - 5	Old Colfeians
	Report

Cobden Hill
Referee: Alan Biggs

29 November 2003

Weston-super-Mare	57 - 25	Southend
	Report

Recreation Ground
Referee: Rob Sawyer

=== Round 11 ===
6 December 2003

Barking	30 - 34	Tabard
	Report

Goresbrook
Referee: Kevin Stewart

6 December 2003

Basingstoke	10 - 27	Old Patesians
	Report

Down Grange
Referee: Greg Garner

6 December 2003

Dings Crusaders	3 - 21	Haywards Heath
	Report

Landseer Avenue
Referee: Terry Hall

6 December 2003

Launceston	25 - 10	North Walsham
	Report

Polson Bridge
Referee: Dale Newitt

6 December 2003

Old Colfeians	5 - 21	Weston-super-Mare
	Report

Horn Park
Referee: Rhys Davies

6 December 2003

Southend	3 - 20	Blackheath
	Report

Warners Bridge Park
Referee: Richard Draper

6 December 2003

Westcombe Park	21 - 10	Redruth
	Report

Goddington Dene
Referee: Rob Sawyer

=== Round 12 ===
13 December 2003

Blackheath	40 - 23	Old Colfeians
	Report

Rectory Field
Referee: Kevin Stewart

13 December 2003

Haywards Heath	7 - 25	Southend
	Report

Whitemans Green
Referee: Mark Varnon

13 December 2003

North Walsham	15 - 0	Dings Crusaders
	Report

Norwich Road
Referee: Rhys Davies

13 December 2003

Old Patesians	12 - 24	Launceston
	Report

Everest Road
Referee: G O'Hara

13 December 2003

Redruth	43 - 15	Basingstoke
	Report

The Recreation Ground
Referee: Terry Hall

13 December 2003

Westcombe Park	0 - 28	Barking
	Report

Goddington Dene
Referee: Richard Phillips

13 December 2003

Weston-super-Mare	21 - 15	Tabard
	Report

Recreation Ground
Referee: D May

=== Round 13 ===
20 December 2003

Barking	11 - 31	Weston-super-Mare
	Report

Goresbrook
Referee: Terry Hall

20 December 2003

Basingstoke	6 - 60	Westcombe Park
	Report

Down Grange
Referee: Kevin Stewart

20 December 2003

Dings Crusaders	8 - 12	Old Patesians
	Report

Landseer Avenue
Referee: Richard Parker-Sedgmore

20 December 2003

Launceston	13 - 11	Redruth
	Report

Polson Bridge
Referee: Richard Phillips

20 December 2003

Old Colfeians	17 - 12	Haywards Heath
	Report

Horn Park
Referee: Greg Garner

20 December 2003

Southend	15 - 13	North Walsham
	Report

Warners Bridge Park
Referee: G O'Hara

20 December 2003

Tabard	25 - 15	Blackheath
	Report

Cobden Hill
Referee: Rhys Davies

=== Round 14 ===
3 January 2004

Blackheath	25 - 5	Southend
	Report

Rectory Field
Referee: Revis Phillips

3 January 2004

Haywards Heath	21 - 10	Dings Crusaders
	Report

Whitemans Green
Referee: G O'Hara

3 January 2004

North Walsham	8 - 14	Launceston
	Report

Norwich Road
Referee: Dean Richards

3 January 2004

Old Patesians	42 - 21	Basingstoke
	Report

Everest Road
Referee: Greg Garner

3 January 2004

Redruth	28 - 9	Westcombe Park
	Report

The Recreation Ground
Referee: D May

3 January 2004

Tabard	20 - 13	Barking
	Report

Cobden Hill
Referee: Steve Harland

3 January 2004

Weston-super-Mare	25 - 15	Old Colfeians
	Report

Recreation Ground
Referee: Mike Hamlin

=== Round 15 ===
10 January 2004

Barking	24 - 8	Redruth
	Report

Goresbrook
Referee: Greg Garner

10 January 2004

Basingstoke	20 - 49	North Walsham
	Report

Down Grange
Referee: Rhys Davies

10 January 2004

Dings Crusaders	17 - 22	Blackheath
	Report

Landseer Avenue
Referee: D May

10 January 2004

Launceston	38 - 14	Haywards Heath
	Report

Polson Bridge
Referee: Kevin Stewart

10 January 2004

Old Colfeians	37 - 25	Tabard
	Report

Horn Park
Referee: G O'Hara

10 January 2004

Southend	31 - 35	Weston-super-Mare
	Report

Warners Bridge Park
Referee: Richard Phillips

10 January 2004

Westcombe Park	3 - 22	Old Patesians
	Report

Goddington Dene
Referee: Dean Richards

=== Round 16 ===
17 January 2004

Blackheath	29 - 26	Launceston
	Report

Rectory Field
Referee: Greg Garner

17 January 2004

Haywards Heath	15 - 13	Basingstoke
	Report

Whitemans Green
Referee: Steve Harland

17 January 2004

North Walsham	27 - 19	Westcombe Park
	Report

Norwich Road
Attendance: 450
Referee: Rob Sawyer

17 January 2004

Old Colfeians	17 - 20	Barking
	Report

Horn Park
Referee: P.W Davies

17 January 2004

Old Patesians	13 - 10	Redruth
	Report

Everest Road
Referee: Terry Hall

17 January 2004

Tabard	24 - 35	Southend
	Report

Cobden Hill
Referee: D May

17 January 2004

Weston-super-Mare	15 - 16	Dings Crusaders
	Report

Recreation Ground
Attendance: 300
Referee: Guy Steel Bodger

=== Round 17 ===
24 January 2004

Barking	18 - 28	Old Patesians
	Report

Goresbrook
Referee: Kevin Stewart

24 January 2004

Basingstoke	3 - 49	Blackheath
	Report

Down Grange
Referee: Rowan Kitt

24 January 2004

Dings Crusaders	21 - 13	Tabard
	Report

Landseer Avenue
Referee: Richard Parker-Sedgmore

24 January 2004

Launceston	30 - 15	Weston-super-Mare
	Report

Polson Bridge
Referee: David Grashoff

24 January 2004

Redruth	28 - 27	North Walsham
	Report

The Recreation Ground
Referee: D May

24 January 2004

Southend	67 - 22	Old Colfeians
	Report

Warners Bridge Park
Referee: Paul Dickens

24 January 2004

Westcombe Park	9 - 25	Haywards Heath
	Report

Goddington Dene
Referee: Greg Garner

=== Round 18 ===
31 January 2004

Blackheath	20 - 8	Westcombe Park
	Report

Rectory Field
Referee: Richard Parker-Sedgmore

31 January 2004

Haywards Heath	5 - 19	Redruth
	Report

Whitemans Green
Referee: Eric Woodmason

31 January 2004

Old Colfeians	17 - 20	Dings Crusaders
	Report

Horn Park
Referee: Kitt Rowan

31 January 2004

Southend	32 - 13	Barking
	Report

Warners Bridge Park
Referee: Terry Hall

31 January 2004

Weston-super-Mare	16 - 19	Basingstoke
	Report

Recreation Ground
Referee: Steve Harland

31 January 2004

North Walsham	P - P	Old Patesians

- Postponed. Game rescheduled to 21 February 2004.

31 January 2004

Tabard	P - P	Launceston

- Postponed. Game rescheduled to 6 March 2004.

=== Round 19 ===
7 February 2004

Barking	17 - 19	North Walsham
	Report

Goresbrook
Referee: Greg Garner

7 February 2004

Basingstoke	18 - 10	Tabard
	Report

Down Grange
Referee: Terry Hall

7 February 2004

Dings Crusaders	8 - 5	Southend
	Report

Landseer Avenue
Referee: Steve Harland

7 February 2004

Launceston	80 - 25	Old Colfeians
	Report

Polson Bridge
Referee: David Sainsbury

7 February 2004

Old Patesians	29 - 6	Haywards Heath
	Report

Everest Road
Referee: Richard Parker-Sedgmore

7 February 2004

Redruth	28 - 13	Blackheath
	Report

The Recreation Ground
Referee: G O'Hara

7 February 2004

Westcombe Park	35 - 19	Weston-super-Mare
	Report

Goddington Dene
Referee: Rowan Kitt

=== Round 20 ===
14 February 2004

Blackheath	62 - 15	Old Patesians
	Report

Rectory Field
Referee: Greg Garner

14 February 2004

Dings Crusaders	24 - 27	Barking
	Report

Landseer Avenue
Referee: D May

14 February 2004

Haywards Heath	36 - 11	North Walsham
	Report

Whitemans Green
Referee: Tim Miller

14 February 2004

Old Colfeians	37 - 57	Basingstoke
	Report

Horn Park
Referee: Richard Parker-Sedgmore

14 February 2004

Southend	7 - 53	Launceston
	Report

Warners Bridge Park
Referee: G O'Hara

14 February 2004

Tabard	22 - 36	Westcombe Park
	Report

Cobden Hill
Referee: Rhys Davies

14 February 2004

Weston-super-Mare	15 - 18	Redruth
	Report

Recreation Ground
Referee: David Grashoff

=== Rounds 4 & 18 (rescheduled games) ===
21 February 2004

Dings Crusaders	6 - 36	Launceston
	Report

Landseer Avenue
Referee: Rhys Davies

- Game rescheduled from 18 October 2003.

21 February 2004

North Walsham	26 - 21	Old Patesians
	Report

Norwich Road
Referee: Dale Newitt

- Game rescheduled from 31 January 2004.

=== Round 21 ===
28 February 2004

Barking	41 - 7	Haywards Heath
	Report

Goresbrook
Referee: Fred Copstake

28 February 2004

Basingstoke	11 - 15	Southend
	Report

Down Grange
Referee: Rhys Davies

28 February 2004

Launceston	29 - 3	Dings Crusaders
	Report

Polson Bridge
Referee: Craig Pocock

28 February 2004

Old Patesians	29 - 12	Weston-super-Mare
	Report

Everest Road
Referee: Darryl Chapman

28 February 2004

Redruth	26 - 15	Tabard
	Report

The Recreation Ground
Referee: Eric Woodmason

28 February 2004

Westcombe Park	36 - 10	Old Colfeians
	Report

Goddington Dene
Referee: Paul Dickens

28 February 2004

North Walsham	P - P	Blackheath

- Postponed. Game rescheduled to 6 March 2004.

=== Rounds 18 & 21 (rescheduled games) ===
6 March 2004

North Walsham	7 - 23	Blackheath
	Report

Norwich Road
Referee: Guy Steel Bodger

- Game rescheduled from 28 February 2004.

6 March 2004

Tabard	29 - 62	Launceston
	Report

Cobden Hill
Referee: Richard Phillips

- Game rescheduled from 31 January 2004.

=== Round 22 ===
13 March 2004

Blackheath	26 - 12	Haywards Heath
	Report

Rectory Field
Referee: Stuart Parker

13 March 2004

Dings Crusaders	21 - 20	Basingstoke
	Report

Landseer Avenue
Referee: Rowan Kitt

13 March 2004

Launceston	25 - 7	Barking
	Report

Polson Bridge
Referee: Richard Phillips

13 March 2004

Old Colfeians	24 - 28	Redruth
	Report

Horn Park
Referee: Rhys Davies

13 March 2004

Southend	49 - 10	Westcombe Park
	Report

Warners Bridge Park
Referee: Andrew Bickle

13 March 2004

Tabard	15 - 17	Old Patesians
	Report

Cobden Hill
Referee: Ed Turnill

13 March 2004

Weston-super-Mare	25 - 33	North Walsham
	Report

Recreation Ground
Referee: D May

=== Round 23 ===
20 March 2004

Barking	0 - 50	Blackheath
	Report

Goresbrook
Referee: David Sainsbury

20 March 2004

Basingstoke	26 - 10	Launceston
	Report

Down Grange
Referee: Tim Miller

20 March 2004

Haywards Heath	22 - 12	Weston-super-Mare
	Report

Whitemans Green
Referee: Gareth Rees-Smith

20 March 2004

North Walsham	39 - 10	Tabard
	Report

Norwich Road
Referee: Terry Hall

20 March 2004

Redruth	30 - 12	Southend
	Report

The Recreation Ground
Referee: Rowan Kitt

20 March 2004

Westcombe Park	76 - 10	Dings Crusaders
	Report

Goddington Dene
Referee: Rob Sawyer

20 March 2004

Old Patesians	P - P	Old Colfeians

- Postponed. Game rescheduled to 27 March 2004.

=== Round 23 (rescheduled game) ===
27 March 2004

Old Patesians	67 - 8	Old Colfeians
	Report

Everest Road
Referee: Steve Harland

- Game rescheduled from 20 March 2004.

=== Round 24 ===
3 April 2004

Basingstoke	26 - 49	Barking
	Report

Down Grange
Referee: Kevin Stewart

3 April 2004

Dings Crusaders	15 - 13	Redruth
	Report

Landseer Avenue
Referee: Guy Steel Bodger

3 April 2004

Launceston	30 - 11	Westcombe Park
	Report

Polson Bridge
Referee: Eric Woodmason

3 April 2004

Old Colfeians	14 - 24	North Walsham
	Report

Horn Park
Referee: Des Headington

3 April 2004

Southend	42 - 22	Old Patesians
	Report

Warners Bridge Park
Referee: Rob Sawyer

3 April 2004

Tabard	18 - 17	Haywards Heath
	Report

Cobden Hill
Referee: Craig Pocock

3 April 2004

Weston-super-Mare	7 - 29	Blackheath
	Report

Recreation Ground
Referee: Richard Phillips

=== Round 25 ===
10 April 2004

Blackheath	38 - 0	Tabard
	Report

Rectory Field
Referee: Richard Parker-Sedgmore

10 April 2004

Haywards Heath	36 - 16	Old Colfeians
	Report

Whitemans Green
Referee: G O'Hara

10 April 2004

North Walsham	25 - 10	Southend
	Report

Norwich Road
Referee: Keith Lewis

10 April 2004

Old Patesians	35 - 22	Dings Crusaders
	Report

Everest Road
Referee: Rowan Kitt

10 April 2004

Redruth	13 - 28	Launceston
	Report

The Recreation Ground
Referee: Paul Dix

10 April 2004

Westcombe Park	66 - 7	Basingstoke
	Report

Goddington Dene
Referee: Terry Hall

10 April 2004

Weston-super-Mare	23 - 11	Barking
	Report

Recreation Ground
Referee: Andrew Bickle

=== Round 26 ===
17 April 2004

Barking	30 - 15	Westcombe Park
	Report

Goresbrook
Referee: Kevin Stewart

17 April 2004

Basingstoke	19 - 31	Redruth
	Report

Down Grange
Referee: Steve Harland

17 April 2004

Dings Crusaders	13 - 20	North Walsham
	Report

Landseer Avenue
Referee: Terry Hall

17 April 2004

Launceston	55 - 17	Old Patesians
	Report

Polson Bridge
Referee: D May

17 April 2004

Old Colfeians	22 - 59	Blackheath
	Report

Horn Park
Referee: Tim Miller

17 April 2004

Southend	48 - 8	Haywards Heath
	Report

Warners Bridge Park
Referee: Rowan Kitt

17 April 2004

Tabard	36 - 38	Weston-super-Mare
	Report

Cobden Hill
Referee: Eric Woodmason

=== Promotion play-off ===
The league runners up of National Division Three South and North would meet in a playoff game for promotion to National Division Two. Halifax were the northern divisions runners up and as they had a superior league record than southern runners-up, Launceston, they hosted the play-off match.

15 May 2004

Halifax	16 - 18	Launceston
	Report

Ovenden Park
Referee: Alan Biggs

== Total season attendances ==
Club	Home Games	Total	Average	Highest	Lowest	% Capacity
Barking	0	0	0	0	0	0%
Basingstoke	0	0	0	0	0	0%
Blackheath	0	0	0	0	0	0%
Dings Crusaders	0	0	0	0	0	0%
Haywards Heath	0	0	0	0	0	
Launceston	0	0	0	0	0	0%
North Walsham	1	450	450	450	450	38%
Old Colfeians	0	0	0	0	0	
Old Patesians	0	0	0	0	0	
Redruth	0	0	0	0	0	0%
Southend	0	0	0	0	0	
Tabard	0	0	0	0	0	
Westcombe Park	0	0	0	0	0	0%
Weston-super-Mare	1	300	300	300	300	10%

== Individual statistics ==
- Note that points scorers includes tries as well as conversions, penalties and drop goals.

=== Top points scorers ===
Rank	Player	Team	Appearances	Points
1	(England) Derek Coates	Blackheath	25	368
2	(New Zealand) Simon Porter	Launceston	22	274
3	(England) Ian Calder	Basingstoke	24	229
4	(England) Rob Colbourne	Tabard	25	207
5	(England) Alister Chambers	Southend	22	198
6	(England) Scott Martin	Redruth	26	197
7	(England) Waylon Gasson	Dings Crusaders	22	160
8	(England) Matthew Holmes	North Walsham	22	160
9	(England) Casey Mee	Barking	25	146
10	(England) Robert Nock	Old Patesians	14	133

=== Top try scorers ===
Rank	Player	Team	Appearances	Tries
1	(South Africa) Gert De Kock	Westcombe Park	22	19
2	(England) Andy Thorpe	North Walsham	22	17
3	(England) Mike Heyns	Launceston	24	16
3	(England) Chris Green	Southend	26	16
4	(England) Mark Sharp	Tabard	25	15
5	(Malta) James O'Brien	Old Patesians	12	13
5	(England) Paul Sprague	Weston-super-Mare	19	13
6	(England) Marc Smith	Southend	18	12
6	(South Africa) Nicholas Maurer	Blackheath	20	12
7	(England) Ashley Rescorla	Launceston	18	11
7	(England) Matthew Britton	Weston-super-Mare	18	11
7	(New Zealand) Simon Porter	Launceston	22	11
7	(England) Jeff van Poortvliet	North Walsham	22	11
7	(England) Lewis Vinnicombe	Redruth	22	11
7	(England) Rob Colbourne	Tabard	25	11
7	(England) James Wagstaff	Southend	24	11

== Season records ==
=== Team ===
Largest home win — 66 pts

76 - 10 Westcombe Park at home to Dings Crusaders on 20 March 2004

Largest away win — 54 pts

60 - 6 Westcombe Park away to Basingstoke on 20 December 2003

Most points scored — 80 pts

80 - 25 Launceston at home to Old Colfeians on 7 February 2004

Most tries in a match — 14

Rosslyn Park at home to Basingstoke on 11 January 2003

Most conversions in a match — 10

Launceston at home to Old Colfeians on 7 February 2004

Most penalties in a match — 6 (x2)

Blackheath away to Launceston on 22 November 2003
Blackheath away to Old Colfeians on 17 April 2004

Most drop goals in a match — 1

N/A - multiple teams

=== Player ===
Most points in a match — 35

(Malta) James O'Brien for Old Patesians at home to Old Colfeians on 27 March 2004

Most tries in a match — 7

(Malta) James O'Brien for Old Patesians at home to Old Colfeians on 27 March 2004

Most conversions in a match — 10

(New Zealand) Simon Porter for Launceston at home to Old Colfeians on 7 February 2004

Most penalties in a match — 6 (x2)

(England) Derek Coates for Blackheath away to Launceston on 22 November 2003
(England) Derek Coates for Blackheath away to Old Colfeians on 17 April 2004

Most drop goals in a match — 1

N/A - multiple players

=== Attendances ===
Highest — N/A

N/A

Lowest — N/A

N/A

Highest Average Attendance — N/A

N/A

Lowest Average Attendance — N/A

N/A

As only two attendances were listed due to poor media and club tracking it is therefore impossible to give any insight into attendances for this season.

== See also ==
- English rugby union system
- Rugby union in England
