= 2004–05 National Division Two =

Rugby union competition in England

- Countries: England
- Champions: Doncaster
- Runners-up: Newbury Blues (also promoted)
- Relegated: Rosslyn Park, Bracknell, Nuneaton
- Attendance: 77,313 (average 463 per match) (Note: Note that 15 home attendances are missing (see below) - so the total attendance will not be 100% accurate. The average attendance has also been taken into account with the missing games not included.)
- Highest attendance: 2,000 Doncaster at home to Manchester on 9 October 2004
- Lowest attendance: 100 (3x) Nuneaton at home to Bracknell & Waterloo on 23 October 2004 & 13 November 2004, Bracknell at home to Esher on 20 November 2004
- Top point scorer: (England) Oliver Thomas; Moseley 328 points
- Top try scorer: (Kenya) Lucas Onyango; Manchester 24 tries

The 2004–05 National Division Two was the fifth version (eighteenth overall) of the third division of the English rugby union league system using the name National Division Two. New teams to the division included Manchester who were relegated from the 2003–04 National Division One while Waterloo came up as champions of the 2003–04 National Division Three North with Blackheath (champions) and Launceston (playoffs) coming up from the 2003–04 National Division Three South. Wakefield had also been supposed to join the division having finished 13th in National Division One but due to financial difficulties the club would go into liquidation and cease to exist. This season would see the league points system being overhauled in the division with four points being awarded for a win, two points for a draw as well as bonus points being introduced (the Premiership had been using them since 2000) with teams being awarded an extra point for scoring four or more tries during a game or if losing, being within seven points of the victor.

Doncaster would finish as league champions, 13 points clear of nearest rivals, Newbury Blues. Both sides would go up to the 2005–06 National Division One. At the other end of the table, apart from Rosslyn Park who were comfortably bottom, it was a very tight relegation battle with Bracknell and Nuneaton eventually going down to join Rosslyn Park despite both sides winning their last games – in the end only 2 points separated 10th placed Esher from 12th placed Nuneaton. Nuneaton would drop down to the 2005–06 National Division Three North while Bracknell and Rosslyn Park went into the 2005–06 National Division Three South.

== Participating teams and locations ==
Locations of the 2004–05 National Division Two teams

Team	Stadium	Capacity	City/Area
Blackheath	Rectory Field	3,500 (500 seats)	Blackheath, London
Bracknell	Lily Hill Park	1,250 (250 seats)	Bracknell, Berkshire
Doncaster	Castle Park	3,075	Doncaster, South Yorkshire
Esher	Molesey Road	3,000	Hersham, Surrey
Harrogate	Claro Road	4,500 (500 seats)	Harrogate, North Yorkshire
Launceston	Polson Bridge	3,000	Launceston, Cornwall
Manchester	Grove Park	4,000	Cheadle Hulme, Greater Manchester
Moseley	Bournbrook		Birmingham, West Midlands
Newbury Blues	Monk's Lane	8,000	Newbury, Berkshire
Nuneaton	Liberty Way	3,800 (500 seats)	Nuneaton, Warwickshire
Rosslyn Park	The Rock	2,000 (630 seats)	Roehampton, London
Stourbridge	Stourton Park	3,500 (499 seats)	Stourbridge, West Midlands
Waterloo	St Anthony's Road	9,950 (950 seats)	Blundellsands, Merseyside
Wharfedale	The Avenue	2,000	Threshfield, Craven, North Yorkshire

== Final league table ==
2004–05 National Division Two table
Pos	Team	Pld	W	D	L	PF	PA	PD	B	Pts
1	Doncaster (P)	26	23	1	2	818	379	+439	12	106
2	Newbury Blues (P)	26	20	0	6	635	390	+245	13	93
3	Moseley	26	17	0	9	665	505	+160	13	81
4	Waterloo	26	14	1	11	650	510	+140	14	72
5	Launceston	26	13	2	11	570	609	−39	14	70
6	Manchester	26	12	2	12	694	541	+153	16	68
7	Stourbridge	26	10	2	14	576	695	−119	15	59
8	Wharfedale	26	11	1	14	481	528	−47	12	58
9	Blackheath	26	11	1	14	496	560	−64	11	57
10	Harrogate	26	10	1	15	607	764	−157	12	54
11	Esher	26	10	0	16	665	744	−79	13	53
12	Nuneaton (R)	26	10	2	14	447	660	−213	8	52
13	Bracknell (R)	26	8	1	17	503	666	−163	17	51
14	Rosslyn Park (R)	26	6	0	20	415	671	−256	11	35

Updated to match(es) played on 30 April 2004. Source: Rugby Statbunker
(P) Promoted; (R) Relegated

== Results ==
=== Round 1 ===
4 September 2004

(BP) Blackheath	16 - 23	Waterloo
	Report

Rectory Field
Attendance: 1,500
Referee: Dean Richards

4 September 2004

(BP) Esher	48 - 24	Nuneaton (BP)
	Report

Molesey Road
Attendance: 400
Referee: Nick Williams

4 September 2004

Harrogate	27 - 27	Launceston
	Report

Claro Road
Attendance: 400
Referee: Alan Biggs

4 September 2004

Moseley	31 - 14	Manchester
	Report

Bournbrook
Attendance: 450
Referee: Chris Sharp

4 September 2004

Newbury Blues	19 - 16	Bracknell (BP)
	Report

Monk's Lane
Attendance: 825
Referee: Richard Draper

4 September 2004

(2BP) Rosslyn Park	32 - 34	Stourbridge (BP)
	Report

The Rock
Attendance: 550
Referee: David Sainsbury

4 September 2004

Wharfedale	12 - 57	Doncaster (BP)
	Report

The Avenue
Attendance: 800
Referee: Tim Wigglesworth

=== Round 2 ===
11 September 2004

(BP) Doncaster	30 - 10	Bracknell
	Report

Castle Park
Attendance: 500
Referee: Trevor Fisher

11 September 2004

Launceston	25 - 6	Moseley
	Report

Polson Bridge
Attendance: 700
Referee: Nigel Higginson

11 September 2004

(BP) Manchester	36 - 12	Blackheath
	Report

Grove Park
Attendance: 250
Referee: Paul Dix

11 September 2004

(2BP) Nuneaton	30 - 36	Harrogate (BP)
	Report

Liberty Way
Attendance: 500
Referee: Chris Sharp

11 September 2004

(BP) Rosslyn Park	11 - 16	Newbury Blues
	Report

The Rock
Attendance: 475
Referee: G Thompson

11 September 2004

(BP) Stourbridge	34 - 22	Esher
	Report

Stourton Park
Attendance: 300
Referee: Richard Phillips

11 September 2004

(BP) Waterloo	49 - 15	Wharfedale
	Report

St Anthony's Road
Referee: Gareth Copsey

=== Round 3 ===
17 September 2004

(BP) Moseley	35 - 0	Nuneaton
	Report

Bournbrook
Attendance: 333
Referee: Llyr Apgeraint-Roberts

18 September 2004

Blackheath	13 - 13	Launceston
	Report

Rectory Field
Attendance: 887
Referee: David Grashoff

18 September 2004

Bracknell	6 - 34	Waterloo
	Report

Lily Hill Park
Referee: Paul Dix

18 September 2004

(BP) Esher	10 - 17	Rosslyn Park
	Report

Molesey Road
Attendance: 600
Referee: Rowan Kitt

18 September 2004

(2BP) Harrogate	36 - 39	Stourbridge (BP)
	Report

Claro Road
Attendance: 420
Referee: G Thompson

18 September 2004

Newbury Blues	15 - 24	Doncaster
	Report

Monk's Lane
Attendance: 350

18 September 2004

Wharfedale	23 - 34	Manchester (BP)
	Report

The Avenue
Attendance: 400
Referee: Alistair Van Wyk

=== Round 4 ===
25 September 2004

Esher	16 - 7	Newbury Blues (BP)
	Report

Molesey Road
Attendance: 400
Referee: Richard Phillips

25 September 2004

(BP) Launceston	11 - 16	Wharfedale
	Report

Polson Bridge
Attendance: 543
Referee: Eric Woodmason

25 September 2004

(BP) Manchester	36 - 3	Bracknell
	Report

Grove Park
Attendance: 298
Referee: Andrew Vertigan

25 September 2004

Nuneaton	5 - 22	Blackheath
	Report

Liberty Way
Attendance: 400
Referee: D Edmunds

25 September 2004

(BP) Rosslyn Park	48 - 10	Harrogate
	Report

The Rock
Attendance: 550
Referee: Tim Miller

25 September 2004

(BP) Stourbridge	34 - 16	Moseley
	Report

Stourton Park
Attendance: 700
Referee: Dean Richards

25 September 2004

Waterloo	6 - 17	Doncaster
	Report

St Anthony's Road
Attendance: 536
Referee: G Thompson

=== Round 5 ===
9 October 2004

(BP) Blackheath	16 - 20	Stourbridge
	Report

Rectory Field
Attendance: 498
Referee: Nick Williams

9 October 2004

(2BP) Bracknell	26 - 33	Launceston (BP)
	Report

Lily Hill Park
Attendance: 350
Referee: Rowan Kitt

9 October 2004

Doncaster	22 - 17	Manchester (BP)
	Report

Castle Park
Attendance: 2,000
Referee: Richard Draper

9 October 2004

(BP) Harrogate	35 - 25	Esher (BP)
	Report

Claro Road
Attendance: 320
Referee: Greg Garner

9 October 2004

(BP) Moseley	40 - 0	Rosslyn Park
	Report

Bournbrook
Attendance: 434
Referee: Richard Phillips

9 October 2004

(BP) Newbury Blues	34 - 21	Waterloo
	Report

Monk's Lane
Attendance: 280
Referee: Dean Richards

9 October 2004

(BP) Wharfedale	54 - 5	Nuneaton
	Report

The Avenue
Attendance: 400
Referee: Tim Wigglesworth

=== Round 6 ===
23 October 2004

Esher	22 - 16	Moseley (BP)
	Report

Molesey Road
Attendance: 475
Referee: David Grashoff

23 October 2004

Harrogate	8 - 32	Newbury Blues (BP)
	Report

Claro Road
Attendance: 333
Referee: Andrew Vertigan

23 October 2004

(BP) Launceston	8 - 15	Doncaster
	Report

Polson Bridge
Attendance: 469
Referee: Richard Phillips

23 October 2004

Manchester	21 - 14	Waterloo (BP)
	Report

Grove Park
Referee: D Edmunds

23 October 2004

Nuneaton	8 - 8	Bracknell
	Report

Liberty Way
Attendance: 100
Referee: David Sainsbury

23 October 2004

Rosslyn Park	8 - 3	Blackheath (BP)
	Report

The Rock
Attendance: 750
Referee: Tim Fisher

23 October 2004

Stourbridge	10 - 22	Wharfedale
	Report

Stourton Park
Attendance: 450
Referee: Paul Dix

=== Round 7 ===
30 October 2004

(BP) Blackheath	33 - 13	Esher
	Report

Rectory Field
Attendance: 554
Referee: Dean Richards

30 October 2004

(BP) Bracknell	5 - 12	Stourbridge
	Report

Lily Hill Park
Attendance: 300
Referee: Dale Newitt

30 October 2004

Doncaster	24 - 3	Nuneaton
	Report

Castle Park
Referee: Rowan Kitt

30 October 2004

(BP) Moseley	49 - 12	Harrogate
	Report

Bournbrook
Attendance: 297
Referee: David Sainsbury

30 October 2004

Newbury Blues	16 - 14	Manchester (BP)
	Report

Monk's Lane
Referee: Nick Williams

30 October 2004

(BP) Waterloo	16 - 19	Launceston
	Report

St Anthony's Road
Attendance: 450
Referee: Trevor Fisher

30 October 2004

Wharfedale	22 - 20	Rosslyn Park (BP)
	Report

The Avenue
Attendance: 400
Referee: Llyr Apgeraint-Roberts

=== Round 8 ===
13 November 2004

Esher	8 - 20	Wharfedale
	Report

Molesey Road
Attendance: 350
Referee: David Sainsbury

13 November 2004

Harrogate	14 - 26	Blackheath (BP)
	Report

Claro Road
Attendance: 225
Referee: Mark Wilson

13 November 2004

(BP) Launceston	35 - 27	Manchester (2BP)
	Report

Polson Bridge
Attendance: 650
Referee: Nigel Higginson

13 November 2004

Moseley	16 - 31	Newbury Blues
	Report

Bournbrook
Attendance: 317
Referee: Marcelo Pilara

13 November 2004

Nuneaton	11 - 10	Waterloo (BP)
	Report

Liberty Way
Attendance: 100
Referee: Paul Dix

13 November 2004

Rosslyn Park	9 - 7	Bracknell (BP)
	Report

The Rock
Attendance: 610
Referee: Rowan Kitt

13 November 2004

Stourbridge	19 - 19	Doncaster
	Report

Stourton Park
Attendance: 600
Referee: Dean Richards

=== Round 9 ===
20 November 2004

(BP) Blackheath	24 - 29	Moseley
	Report

Rectory Field
Attendance: 405
Referee: Greg Garner

20 November 2004

(BP) Bracknell	29 - 20	Esher
	Report

Lily Hill Park
Attendance: 100
Referee: Marcelo Pilara

20 November 2004

Doncaster	24 - 6	Rosslyn Park
	Report

Castle Park
Attendance: 470
Referee: Tim Wigglesworth

20 November 2004

(BP) Manchester	39 - 15	Nuneaton
	Report

Grove Park
Attendance: 208
Referee: Richard Draper

20 November 2004

Newbury Blues	20 - 13	Launceston (BP)
	Report

Monk's Lane
Attendance: 322
Referee: Paul Dix

20 November 2004

Waterloo	16 - 16	Stourbridge
	Report

St Anthony's Road
Referee: Tim Miller

20 November 2004

(BP) Wharfedale	26 - 17	Harrogate
	Report

The Avenue
Attendance: 600
Referee: Andrew Vertigan

=== Round 10 ===
27 November 2004

Blackheath	10 - 45	Newbury Blues (BP)
	Report

Rectory Field
Attendance: 368
Referee: David Sainsbury

27 November 2004

Esher	26 - 46	Doncaster (BP)
	Report

Molesey Road
Attendance: 350
Referee: Paul Dix

27 November 2004

(BP) Harrogate	79 - 5	Bracknell
	Report

Claro Road
Attendance: 200
Referee: D Edmunds

27 November 2004

Moseley	23 - 11	Wharfedale
	Report

Bournbrook
Attendance: 195
Referee: Dean Richards

27 November 2004

Nuneaton	6 - 19	Launceston
	Report

Liberty Way
Referee: Llyr Apgeraint-Roberts

27 November 2004

(BP) Stourbridge	12 - 14	Manchester
	Report

Stourton Park
Attendance: 350
Referee: Kitt Rowan

27 November 2004

Rosslyn Park	P - P	Waterloo

- Postponed. Game rescheduled to 12 February 2005.

=== Round 11 ===
4 December 2004

(BP) Bracknell	19 - 23	Moseley
	Report

Lily Hill Park
Attendance: 225
Referee: Tim Miller

4 December 2004

(BP) Doncaster	53 - 3	Harrogate
	Report

Castle Park
Referee: Rowan Kitt

4 December 2004

(BP) Launceston	59 - 13	Stourbridge
	Report

Polson Bridge
Attendance: 532
Referee: David Sainsbury

4 December 2004

(BP) Manchester	32 - 8	Rosslyn Park
	Report

Grove Park
Attendance: 312
Referee: Paul Dix

4 December 2004

(BP) Newbury Blues	51 - 3	Nuneaton
	Report

Monk's Lane
Attendance: 350
Referee: Al Klemp

4 December 2004

Waterloo	22 - 20	Esher (BP)
	Report

St Anthony's Road
Attendance: 200
Referee: Richard Draper

4 December 2004

Wharfedale	23 - 20	Blackheath (BP)
	Report

The Avenue
Attendance: 450
Referee: Nick Williams

=== Round 12 ===
11 December 2004

(BP) Blackheath	36 - 12	Bracknell
	Report

Rectory Field
Attendance: 426
Referee: Dean Richards

11 December 2004

(BP) Esher	41 - 39	Manchester (2BP)
	Report

Molesey Road
Attendance: 500
Referee: Andrew Vertigan

11 December 2004

Harrogate	15 - 26	Waterloo
	Report

Claro Road
Attendance: 366
Referee: Chris Sharp

11 December 2004

Moseley	21 - 20	Doncaster (BP)
	Report

Bournbrook
Attendance: 433
Referee: Al Klemp

11 December 2004

Rosslyn Park	15 - 27	Launceston (BP)
	Report

The Rock
Attendance: 410
Referee: Greg Garner

11 December 2004

(BP) Stourbridge	41 - 24	Nuneaton
	Report

Stourton Park
Attendance: 550
Referee: Richard Phillips

11 December 2004

Wharfedale	9 - 6	Newbury Blues (BP)
	Report

The Avenue
Attendance: 540
Referee: Gareth Copsey

=== Round 13 ===
18 December 2004

Bracknell	22 - 15	Wharfedale (BP)
	Report

Lily Hill Park
Attendance: 160
Referee: Trevor Fisher

18 December 2004

Doncaster	22 - 19	Blackheath (BP)
	Report

Castle Park
Attendance: 853
Referee: Richard Draper

18 December 2004

(BP) Launceston	38 - 18	Esher
	Report

Polson Bridge
Attendance: 650
Referee: David Grashoff

18 December 2004

Manchester	18 - 9	Harrogate
	Report

Grove Park
Attendance: 299
Referee: Dale Newitt

18 December 2004

(BP) Newbury Blues	42 - 13	Stourbridge
	Report

Monk's Lane
Attendance: 415
Referee: Chris Sharp

18 December 2004

Nuneaton	9 - 33	Rosslyn Park (BP)
	Report

Liberty Way
Referee: Brendan Fitzmaurice

18 December 2004

(2BP) Waterloo	24 - 25	Moseley
	Report

St Anthony's Road
Attendance: 321
Referee: Mark Wilson

=== Round 14 ===
8 January 2005

Blackheath	17 - 10	Bracknell (BP)
	Report

Rectory Field
Attendance: 273
Referee: Rowan Kitt

8 January 2005

Esher	11 - 24	Waterloo (BP)
	Report

Molesey Road
Attendance: 400
Referee: Richard Phillips

8 January 2005

(BP) Harrogate	8 - 14	Doncaster
	Report

Claro Road
Attendance: 430
Referee: Andrew Small

8 January 2005

(BP) Moseley	22 - 20	Bracknell
	Report

Bournbrook
Referee: Paul Dix

8 January 2005

Nuneaton	8 - 6	Newbury Blues (BP)
	Report

Liberty Way
Attendance: 320
Referee: Tim Wigglesworth

8 January 2005

Rosslyn Park	6 - 42	Manchester (BP)
	Report

The Rock
Attendance: 490
Referee: Greg Garner

8 January 2005

(BP) Stourbridge	20 - 27	Launceston
	Report

Stourton Park
Attendance: 520
Referee: Andrew Vertigan

=== Round 15 ===
15 January 2005

(BP) Bracknell	49 - 10	Harrogate
	Report

Lily Hill Park
Attendance: 159
Referee: Terry Hall

15 January 2005

(BP) Doncaster	47 - 22	Esher
	Report

Castle Park
Attendance: 770
Referee: Paul Dix

15 January 2005

(BP) Launceston	7 - 10	Nuneaton
	Report

Polson Bridge
Attendance: 649
Referee: Dale Newitt

15 January 2005

Manchester	18 - 27	Stourbridge
	Report

Grove Park
Attendance: 356
Referee: Llyr Apgeraint-Roberts

15 January 2005

(BP) Newbury Blues	41 - 13	Blackheath
	Report

Monk's Lane
Attendance: 421
Referee: Nick Williams

15 January 2005

(BP) Waterloo	52 - 17	Rosslyn Park
	Report

St Anthony's Road
Referee: Richard Draper

15 January 2005

Wharfedale	16 - 10	Moseley (BP)
	Report

The Avenue
Attendance: 450
Referee: Trevor Fisher

=== Round 16 ===
22 January 2005

(BP) Esher	26 - 33	Bracknell (BP)
	Report

Molesey Road
Attendance: 500
Referee: Gareth Copsey

22 January 2005

Harrogate	21 - 15	Wharfedale (BP)
	Report

Claro Road
Attendance: 645
Referee: Dale Newitt

22 January 2005

(BP) Launceston	3 - 11	Newbury Blues
	Report

Polson Bridge
Attendance: 658
Referee: David Sainsbury

22 January 2005

(BP) Moseley	39 - 10	Blackheath
	Report

Bournbrook
Attendance: 365
Referee: Richard Phillips

22 January 2005

Nuneaton	23 - 23	Manchester
	Report

Liberty Way
Attendance: 320
Referee: Andrew Vertigan

22 January 2005

Rosslyn Park	3 - 48	Doncaster (BP)
	Report

The Rock
Attendance: 470
Referee: Rowan Kitt

22 January 2005

(BP) Stourbridge	9 - 16	Waterloo
	Report

Stourton Park
Attendance: 540
Referee: Greg Garner

=== Round 17 ===
29 January 2005

(BP) Blackheath	19 - 22	Harrogate (BP)
	Report

Rectory Field
Attendance: 742
Referee: Brendan Fitzmaurice

29 January 2005

Bracknell	29 - 15	Rosslyn Park
	Report

Lily Hill Park
Attendance: 250
Referee: Trevor Fisher

29 January 2005

(BP) Doncaster	48 - 17	Stourbridge
	Report

Castle Park
Attendance: 742
Referee: Nick Williams

29 January 2005

(BP) Manchester	45 - 17	Launceston
	Report

Grove Park
Attendance: 285
Referee: Chris Sharp

29 January 2005

Newbury Blues	20 - 6	Moseley
	Report

Monk's Lane
Attendance: 333
Referee: Paul Dix

29 January 2005

Waterloo	24 - 17	Nuneaton (BP)
	Report

St Anthony's Road
Attendance: 350
Referee: Terry Hall

29 January 2005

(2BP) Wharfedale	32 - 33	Esher (BP)
	Report

The Avenue
Attendance: 400
Referee: Mark Wilson

=== Round 18 ===
5 February 2005

Esher	26 - 13	Blackheath
	Report

Molesey Road
Attendance: 450
Referee: Rowan Kitt

5 February 2005

Harrogate	22 - 32	Moseley (BP)
	Report

Claro Road
Attendance: 310
Referee: Llyr Apgeraint-Roberts

5 February 2005

(BP) Launceston	30 - 27	Waterloo (2BP)
	Report

Polson Bridge
Attendance: 481
Referee: Nick Williams

5 February 2005

(BP) Manchester	16 - 21	Newbury Blues
	Report

Grove Park
Attendance: 306
Referee: Alan Biggs

5 February 2005

Nuneaton	17 - 26	Doncaster
	Report

Liberty Way
Attendance: 350
Referee: Chris Sharp

5 February 2005

(BP) Rosslyn Park	12 - 18	Wharfedale
	Report

The Rock
Attendance: 410
Referee: Paul Dix

5 February 2005

(BP) Stourbridge	19 - 22	Bracknell
	Report

Stourton Park
Attendance: 425
Referee: Richard Draper

=== Round 10 (rescheduled game) ===
12 February 2005

Rosslyn Park	8 - 22	Waterloo
	Report

The Rock
Attendance: 370
Referee: Dean Richards

- Game rescheduled from 27 November 2004.

=== Round 19 ===
19 February 2005

Blackheath	9 - 5	Rosslyn Park (BP)
	Report

Rectory Field
Attendance: 573
Referee: Llyr Apgeraint-Roberts

19 February 2005

(BP) Bracknell	16 - 17	Nuneaton
	Report

Lily Hill Park
Attendance: 256
Referee: Nick Williams

19 February 2005

(BP) Doncaster	63 - 12	Launceston
	Report

Castle Park
Attendance: 669
Referee: Dean Richards

19 February 2005

(BP) Moseley	38 - 30	Esher (BP)
	Report

Bournbrook
Attendance: 321
Referee: Chris Sharp

19 February 2005

Newbury Blues	22 - 15	Harrogate (BP)
	Report

Monk's Lane
Attendance: 420
Referee: Gareth Copsey

19 February 2005

Waterloo	24 - 12	Manchester
	Report

St Anthony's Road
Attendance: 325
Referee: Trevor Fisher

19 February 2005

Wharfedale	18 - 27	Stourbridge (BP)
	Report

The Avenue
Attendance: 450
Referee: David Sainsbury

=== Round 20 ===
26 February 2005

(BP) Esher	42 - 10	Harrogate
	Report

Molesey Road
Attendance: 375
Referee: Greg Garner

26 February 2005

(BP) Launceston	31 - 28	Bracknell (BP)
	Report

Polson Bridge
Attendance: 420
Referee: Nigel Higginson

26 February 2005

Manchester	13 - 37	Doncaster (BP)
	Report

Grove Park
Attendance: 341
Referee: Mark Wilson

26 February 2005

Nuneaton	7 - 5	Wharfedale (BP)
	Report

Liberty Way
Referee: Richard Draper

26 February 2005

Rosslyn Park	18 - 33	Moseley (BP)
	Report

The Rock
Attendance: 280
Referee: Rowan Kitt

26 February 2005

Stourbridge	21 - 37	Blackheath
	Report

Stourton Park
Attendance: 374
Referee: D Edmunds

26 February 2005

Waterloo	20 - 18	Newbury Blues (BP)
	Report

St Anthony's Road
Attendance: 325
Referee: Dale Newitt

=== Round 21 ===
12 March 2005

Blackheath	26 - 17	Nuneaton
	Report

Rectory Field
Attendance: 480
Referee: Rowan Kitt

12 March 2005

(BP) Bracknell	32 - 20	Manchester
	Report

Lily Hill Park
Attendance: 200
Referee: Terry Hall

12 March 2005

(BP) Doncaster	53 - 25	Waterloo
	Report

Castle Park
Referee: Andrew Vertigan

12 March 2005

(BP) Harrogate	51 - 36	Rosslyn Park (BP)
	Report

Claro Road
Attendance: 420
Referee: Alan Biggs

12 March 2005

(BP) Moseley	13 - 20	Stourbridge
	Report

Bournbrook
Attendance: 321
Referee: Richard Draper

12 March 2005

(BP) Newbury Blues	35 - 29	Esher (BP)
	Report

Monk's Lane
Attendance: 345
Referee: Revis Phillips

12 March 2005

(BP) Wharfedale	23 - 25	Launceston
	Report

The Avenue
Attendance: 422
Referee: Brendan Fitzmaurice

=== Round 22 ===
18 March 2005

Nuneaton	30 - 25	Moseley (BP)
	Report

Liberty Way
Referee: David Grashoff

19 March 2005

Doncaster	33 - 29	Newbury Blues (2BP)
	Report

Castle Park
Attendance: 928
Referee: Tim Wigglesworth

19 March 2005

(BP) Launceston	23 - 29	Blackheath (BP)
	Report

Polson Bridge
Attendance: 455
Referee: Nick Williams

19 March 2005

Manchester	22 - 22	Wharfedale
	Report

Grove Park
Attendance: 260
Referee: Richard Draper

19 March 2005

Rosslyn Park	11 - 27	Esher
	Report

The Rock
Attendance: 620
Referee: Dean Richards

19 March 2005

(2BP) Stourbridge	30 - 35	Harrogate (BP)
	Report

Stourton Park
Attendance: 420
Referee: Llyr Apgeraint-Roberts

19 March 2005

(BP) Waterloo	66 - 26	Bracknell
	Report

St Anthony's Road
Attendance: 453
Referee: Andrew Small

=== Round 23 ===
2 April 2005

Blackheath	13 - 48	Manchester (BP)
	Report

Rectory Field
Attendance: 850
Referee: Richard Phillips

2 April 2005

Bracknell	19 - 37	Doncaster (BP)
	Report

Lily Hill Park
Attendance: 255
Referee: Andrew Vertigan

2 April 2005

(BP) Esher	38 - 26	Stourbridge (BP)
	Report

Molesey Road
Attendance: 425
Referee: Terry Hall

2 April 2005

Harrogate	20 - 42	Nuneaton (BP)
	Report

Claro Road
Attendance: 778
Referee: Mark Wilson

2 April 2005

(BP) Moseley	41 - 17	Launceston
	Report

Bournbrook
Attendance: 394
Referee: Trevor Fisher

2 April 2005

Newbury Blues	21 - 13	Rosslyn Park
	Report

Monk's Lane
Attendance: 452
Referee: Rowan Kitt

2 April 2005

Wharfedale	10 - 26	Waterloo
	Report

The Avenue
Attendance: 423
Referee: Dale Newitt

=== Round 24 ===
9 April 2005

(BP) Bracknell	20 - 22	Newbury Blues
	Report

Lily Hill Park
Attendance: 365
Referee: Nick Williams

9 April 2005

Doncaster	8 - 3	Wharfedale (BP)
	Report

Castle Park
Attendance: 950
Referee: D Edmunds

9 April 2005

Launceston	12 - 21	Harrogate
	Report

Polson Bridge
Attendance: 485
Referee: Gareth Copsey

9 April 2005

Manchester	10 - 31	Molesey (BP)
	Report

Grove Park
Attendance: 327
Referee: Tim Miller

9 April 2005

(BP) Nuneaton	38 - 25	Esher
	Report

Liberty Way
Referee: David Sainsbury

9 April 2005

Stourbridge	20 - 37	Rosslyn Park (BP)
	Report

Stourton Park
Attendance: 340
Referee: Greg Garner

9 April 2005

(BP) Waterloo	10 - 16	Blackheath
	Report

St Anthony's Road
Attendance: 463
Referee: Brendan Fitzmaurice

=== Round 25 ===
23 April 2005

Blackheath	30 - 0	Doncaster
	Report

Rectory Field
Attendance: 1,175
Referee: Greg Garner

23 April 2005

(BP) Esher	52 - 12	Launceston
	Report

Molesey Road
Attendance: 450
Referee: Richard Phillips

23 April 2005

(BP) Harrogate	32 - 19	Manchester
	Report

Claro Road
Attendance: 520
Referee: Dale Newitt

23 April 2005

Moseley	29 - 25	Waterloo (BP)
	Report

Bournbrook
Attendance: 381
Referee: Tim Wigglesworth

23 April 2005

Rosslyn Park	6 - 41	Nuneaton (BP)
	Report

The Rock
Attendance: 520
Referee: Terry Hall

23 April 2005

Stourbridge	12 - 26	Newbury Blues
	Report

Stourton Park
Attendance: 455
Referee: Chris Sharp

23 April 2005

Wharfedale	13 - 9	Bracknell (BP)
	Report

The Avenue
Attendance: 375
Referee: Llyr Apgeraint-Roberts

=== Round 26 ===
30 April 2005

(BP) Bracknell	35 - 14	Blackheath
	Report

Lily Hill Park
Attendance: 384
Referee: Dean Richards

30 April 2005

Doncaster	31 - 16	Moseley
	Report

Castle Park
Attendance: 904
Referee: Alan Biggs

30 April 2005

(BP) Launceston	27 - 21	Rosslyn Park (BP)
	Report

Polson Bridge
Attendance: 598
Referee: Steve Harland

30 April 2005

(BP) Manchester	65 - 15	Esher
	Report

Grove Park
Attendance: 457
Referee: Andrew Vertigan

30 April 2005

(BP) Newbury Blues	29 - 28	Wharfedale (2BP)
	Report

Monk's Lane
Attendance: 803
Referee: David Sainsbury

30 April 2005

(BP) Nuneaton	37 - 31	Stourbridge (2BP)
	Report

Liberty Way
Attendance: 400
Referee: David Grashoff

30 April 2005

(BP) Waterloo	28 - 39	Harrogate (BP)
	Report

St Anthony's Road
Attendance: 652
Referee: D Edmunds

== Total season attendances ==
Club	Home Games	Total	Average	Highest	Lowest	% Capacity
Blackheath	13	8,731	672	1,500	273	19%
Bracknell	12 (Note: Missing home attendance v Waterloo on 18 September 2004.)	3,004	250	384	100	20%
Doncaster	10 (Note: Missing home attendances v Nuneaton on 30 October 2004, Harrogate on 4 December 2004 & Waterloo on 12 March 2005.)	8,786	879	2,000	470	29%
Esher	13	5,675	437	600	350	15%
Harrogate	13	5,367	413	778	200	9%
Launceston	13	7,290	561	700	420	19%
Manchester	12 (Note: Missing home attendance v Waterloo on 23 October 2004.)	3,699	308	457	208	8%
Moseley	12 (Note: Missing home attendance v Bracknell on 8 January 2005.)	4,241	353	450	195	
Newbury Blues	12 (Note: Missing home attendance v Manchester on 30 October 2004.)	5,316	443	825	280	6%
Nuneaton	8 (Note: Missing home attendances v Launceston on 27 November 2004, Rosslyn Park on 18 December 2004, Wharfedale on 26 February 2005, Moseley on 18 March 2005 & Nuneaton on 9 April 2005.)	2,490	311	500	100	8%
Rosslyn Park	13	6,505	500	750	280	25%
Stourbridge	13	6,024	463	700	300	13%
Waterloo	10 (Note: Missing home attendances v Wharfedale on 11 September 2004, Stourbridge on 20 November 2004 & Rosslyn Park on 15 January 2005.)	4,075	408	652	200	4%
Wharfedale	13	6,110	470	800	375	24%

== Individual statistics ==
- Note that points scorers includes tries as well as conversions, penalties and drop goals.

=== Top points scorers ===
Rank	Player	Team	Appearances	Points
1	(England) Oliver Thomas	Moseley	25	328
2	(England) Rob Liley	Doncaster	24	321
3	(Australia) David Harvey	Newbury Blues	23	285
4	(England) Neil Hallett	Bracknell / Esher	22	248
5	(England) Stephen McCashin	Blackheath	24	228
6	(England) Jonathon Davies	Wharfedale	25	214
7	(England) Lee Cholewa	Harrogate	25	196
8	(England) Andy Frost	Bracknell	19	172
9	(England) Ben Harvey	Stourbridge	20	164
10	(England) Steven Perry	Launceston	25	149

=== Top try scorers ===
Rank	Player	Team	Appearances	Tries
1	(Kenya) Lucas Onyango	Manchester	22	24
2	(South Africa) Donovan van Vuuren	Doncaster	20	20
3	(England) Nathan Bressington	Moseley	26	16
4	(England) James Tapster	Harrogate	23	13
5	(England) Martin Lacey	Launceston	16	12
5	(England) Andre Wilson	Manchester	26	12
5	(South Africa) Jan Van Deventer	Waterloo	25	12
6	(England) Martin Nutt	Newbury	17	11
7	(England) Richard Briggs	Doncaster	15	10
7	(England) Marc Dibble	Launceston	20	10

== Season records ==
=== Team ===
Largest home win — 74 pts

79 - 5 Harrogate at home to Bracknell on 27 November 2004

Largest away win — 45 pts

57 - 12 Doncaster away to Wharfedale on 20 4 September 2004

Most points scored — 74 pts

79 - 5 Harrogate at home to Bracknell on 27 November 2004

Most tries in a match — 11

Harrogate at home to Bracknell on 27 November 2004

Most conversions in a match — 9

Harrogate at home to Bracknell on 27 November 2004

Most penalties in a match — 6

Blackheath away to Stourbridge on 26 February 2005

Most drop goals in a match — 1

N/A - multiple teams

=== Player ===
Most points in a match — 29

(England) Jonathan Davies for Wharfedale at home to Nuneaton on 9 October 2004

Most tries in a match — 3

N/A - multiple players

Most conversions in a match — 9

(England) Lee Cholewa for Harrogate at home to Bracknell on 27 November 2004

Most penalties in a match — 6

(England) Stephen McCashin for Blackheath away to Stourbridge on 26 February 2005

Most drop goals in a match — 1

N/A - multiple players

=== Attendances ===
Highest — 2,000

Doncaster at home to Manchester on 9 October 2004

Lowest — 120 (x3)

Nuneaton at home to Bracknell on 23 October 2004 and Waterloo on 13 November 2004
Bracknell at home to Esher on 20 November 2004

Highest Average Attendance — 879

Doncaster

Lowest Average Attendance — 250

Bracknell

== See also ==
- English Rugby Union Leagues
- English rugby union system
- Rugby union in England
