= 2025–26 Worcester Warriors season =

English Rugby Union club season

Worcester Warriors
- 2025–26 season
- Chairman: Chris Holland
- CEO: Stephen Vaughan
- Head coach: Matt Everard
- Stadium: Sixways Stadium
- Champ Rugby: –
- Highest home attendance: –
- Average home attendance: –
Home colours	Away colours

The current 2025–26 season is Worcester Warriors first since entering administration and being expelled from the Premiership in October 2022. They will play in Champ Rugby, the newly rebranded second tier of English Rugby Union.

== Kit ==
Detail	Brand
Kit supplier	Macron
Front of shirt sponsor	Morgan Motor Company

== Story of the season ==
On 3 April 2025, Worcester Warriors made the following announcement of their return:

More than two years after entering administration, Worcester Warriors have been selected by the Tier 2 Board to join the Tier 2 league. The team will compete in the 2025/2026 season at Sixways Stadium in Worcester.

=== The summer and pre-season ===
On 13 May, Matt Everard was announced as the new Head Coach. The following day, they announced their first incoming player for the upcoming season, with former Warriors flanker Matt Kvesic returning to the club after two seasons at Coventry.

As the following weeks progressed, Warriors began to build their squad, inviting fans to guess each player on a near daily basis, and giving three clues to help identify with an animated card titled "Guess the Warrior?", alike the children's board game, Guess Who?. Each player was then subsequently revealed at the end of the day.

On 22 May, Warriors announced that Tom Cruse had joined as Everard's assistant coach and on 31 May, Will Cusack joined as the new Head of Strength & Power Conditioning. On 2 June, former British & Irish Lions and England international Billy Twelvetrees was announced as Warriors 14th signing of the season in a player-coach role, coming out of retirement. On 5 June, Warriors announced their partnership with Italian sportswear manufacturer Macron to become their official kit supplier.

On 17 June, Warriors announced their title sponsorship with the Malvern-based British motor car manufacturer Morgan, to adorn their home and away kits for the season, with additional partnership bradning between the two. On 21 June, Sam Handy was announced as the new Head of Rugby Conditioning.

=== September ===
On September 13, Warriors would play their first game in 1,084 days, opening their pre-season against Ampthill at Dillingham Park. Warriors named a 34-man squad for the tie, naming fly-halfs Will Lane and Tiff Eden as the captains for each half.

Warriors kick started their return to action with a 54–12 pre-season win on the road at their upcoming seasons Champ rivals. On September 18, with the squad announcement for the first match back at Sixways, the pre-season friendly against Bath Rugby, Warriors also announced that Matt Rogerson had been named the club captain for the upcoming season.

On Friday, September 19, Warriors would play their first game in front of the home crowd at Sixways, facing the reigning Premiership Champions Bath. Bath named Ollie Lawrence and Ted Hill in their starting XV, and the former Warriors received a wholesome welcome from the capacity crowd. Despite a strong showing by the hosts, Bath proved too strong and achieved a narrow 33-19 win.

== Transfers ==
=== Transferred in ===
Date	Player	Pos	From	Guess the Warrior?
14 May 2025	(England) Matt Kvesic	BR	(England) Coventry RFC	Loves a Jackal; Former England International; Previously represented Stourbridge RFC
15 May 2025	(England) Josh Bassett	WG	(England) Leicester Tigers	Played youth team rugby at Ampthill; Star sign is Pisces; Top 15 all time Premiership try scorers
16 May 2025	(England) Tiff Eden	FH	(England) Saracens	Once a Warrior, always a Warrior; Born in the year the Channel Tunnel was officially opened; Played for three teams in the Championship
17 May 2025	(Australia) Tim Anstee	BR	(United States) RFC Los Angeles	Cosmopolitan Bachelor of the Year nominee; Participated in the Commonwealth Games; Played over 40 games in Super Rugby
19 May 2025	(Wales) Lloyd Williams	SH	(England) Ealing Trailfinders	Welsh international who played in two RWC; Being a rugby player runs in the family; Played for the Barbarians
20 May 2025	(England) Fraser Balmain	PR	(England) Saracens	He has propped up the scrum at 3 Premiership teams; Won the Premiership; He's a Geordie
21 May 2025	(Wales) Will Reed	FH	(Wales) Dragons RFC	Played in U20 Six Nations; Product of the Dragons RFC academy; Born in the year the iPod first launched
24 May 2025	(Fiji) Livai Natave	PR	(Fiji) Fijian Drua	Made his international debut versus Scotland; Loves listening to music before a match; Fijian Naval Officer
26 May 2025	(England) Tim Hoyt	PR	(England) Leicester Tigers	Stepped up from senior academy to first XV rugby with Leicester Tigers; Played for England U20s; Loves a good scrum
27 May 2025	(England) Will Trewin	FB/WG	(England) Cornish Pirates	Born in Truro; Versatile back who plays at full-back or on the wing; Loves to surf and fish when not playing rugby
28 May 2025	(England) Billy Keast	PR	(England) Exeter Chiefs	Started as a tighthead, but transitioned to a loosehead prop; Owns a speciality coffee brand; Came through the Exeter Chiefs academy
29 May 2025	(England) Archie Vanes	HK	(England) Leicester Tigers	Scored a hat-trick in his European Rugby Champions Cup debut; He was mentored by Tom Youngs; Born in a year that England won the 6 Nations
29 May 2025	(Uruguay) Juan González	FB/WG	(Uruguay) Peñarol Rugby	Participated in the Olympic Games; Versatile back who is known for his speed and agility; A citizen of the country with the world's longest national anthem
2 June 2025	(England) (British & Irish Lions) Billy Twelvetrees	CE	-	Played for England and toured with the Lions; Clocked up just under 300 Premiership appearances; Played cricket for Wisborough Green CC
3 June 2025	(England) Alfie Garside	WG	(England) Bedford Blues	Making moves on the wing in the Championship; Has a Masters Degree from Bath University; The taller one!
4 June 2025	(England) Jake Garside	SH	(England) Northampton Saints	Scored a try on his senior debut for a Premiership team; Has experience at a Championship club; Calls Norfolk home
4 June 2025	(England) Louis Brown	FB/WG	(England) Newcastle Falcons	Started his career in Rugby League; Known for having a powerful left foot; Born in the same year Google was officially launched
6 June 2025	(Scotland) James Tyas	BR/LK	(England) Coventry RFC	A powerful forward, he loves a lineout; Competed against Matt Everard in the 2011 Junior World Cup; Made over 150 Championship appearances
7 June 2025	(England) Rory Taylor	CE	(England) Gloucester Rugby	Developed through the London Irish academy; Born in the same year that Facebook launched; Played in the 2024 U20 Six Nations Championship
9 June 2025	(South Africa) Thabo Ndimande	BR	(South Africa) Griquas	Plays in the Currie Cup; Toured Georgia with Junior Boks; Played centre before transitioning to flanker
10 June 2025	(England) Will Lane	SH	(England) Coventry RFC	Home grown academy player; First professional contract was with Jersey Reds; Has a degree from Loughborough University
11 June 2025	(England) Will Biggs	HK	(England) Coventry RFC	Captained the 2019 winning Bucs team; Played for Worcester RFC; Founder of tech platform used across rugby
12 June 2025	(France) Côme Joussain	SR	(England) Leicester Tigers	Has played in the Top 14 and Gallagher Premiership; Developed in the Stade Français academy; Scored a try in a 2024/25 Champions Cup match
13 June 2025	(Scotland) Callum Smyth	PR	(Scotland) Glasgow Warriors	Awarded the MacPhail Rugby Scholarship; Played for Scotland in the U20 Six Nations; Developed in the Northampton Saints academy
14 June 2025	(England) Roma Zheng	WG	(England) Harlequins	He comes from English and Chinese descent; Scored a try on his debut for a Premiership team; Played Bucs Rugby for Cardiff Metropolitan University
16 June 2025	(England) Khalik Kareem	BR	(England) Bath Rugby	London born, Ex-Downside School pupil; Has a Degree from Leeds Beckett Univsersity; Senior academy player for Bath Rugby
17 June 2025	(England) Obinna Nkwocha	SR	(England) Coventry RFC	Featured in the 2023/24 Championship Team of the Season; Attended Felsted School; Developed in Saracens academy
18 June 2025	(England) James Short	CE	(England) Bath Rugby	He likes to be in the centre of things; Has experience in the Championship and Premiership; He was a student at Beechen Cliff School
19 June 2025	(England) Tom Seabrook	CE	(England) Northampton Saints	Scored a speedy try during his Premiership debut; A versatile back; Scored a hat-trick in the Champions Cup
20 June 2025	(England) Matt Rogerson	BR	(England) Leicester Tigers	A centurion at one of his clubs; Loughborough University graduate; Played in the 2024/25 Premiership Final
11 September 2025	(England) Hallam Chapman	BR/LK	(England) Exeter Chiefs	
11 September 2025	(Wales) Tom Golder	SR	(England) Harlequins	
11 September 2025	(England) Chris Preen	CE	(England) Loughborough Students	
11 September 2025	(England) Austin Wallis	HK	(England) London Scottish	
11 September 2025	(England) Ashley Challenger	PR	(England) London Scottish	
11 September 2025	(Fiji) Siva Naulago	WG	(England) Bristol Bears	
26 September 2025	(Wales) George Young	BR	(Wales) Dragons	Born at home in Newport; Come up through the Dragons Academy; Nicknamed 'Bosun' - which has passed through the family
3 October 2025	(England) Harvey Cuckson	LK	(England) Bath Rugby (Loan)	
3 October 2025	(England) Jasper Spandler	HK	(England) Bath Rugby (Loan)	
3 October 2025	(England) Mikey Summerfield	PR	(England) Bath Rugby (Loan)	
16 October 2025	(England) Will Jeanes	FL	(England) Bath Rugby (Loan)	
30 October 2025	(England) Huw Taylor	BR	(United States) Seattle Seawolves	
14 November 2025	(Wales) Harry Olding	PR	(Wales) Bridgend Ravens (Loan)	
30 October 2025	(England) Cam Miell	PR	(England) Leicester Tigers (Loan)	
14 November 2025	(Wales) Tom Cowan	BR	(Wales) Bath Rugby (Loan)	
5 December 2025	(New Zealand) Tom Hendrickson	CE	(New Zealand) North Harbour	

== Squad ==
=== Forwards ===
Pos	Name	Nat	Date of birth (age)	Signed from	App	Pts
Front row
HK	Will Biggs	(England)	19 May 1997 (aged 28)	Coventry RFC	4	0
HK	Jasper Spandler	(England)	21 May 2003 (aged 22)	Bath Rugby (Loan)	3	10
HK	Archie Vanes	(England)	16 September 2001 (aged 23)	Leicester Tigers	–	–
HK	Austin Wallis	(England)	13 December 1999 (aged 25)	London Scottish	3	0
PR	Fraser Balmain	(England)	16 November 1991 (aged 33)	Saracens	–	–
PR	Ashley Challenger	(England)	9 September 1995 (aged 29)	London Scottish	5	5
PR	Tim Hoyt	(England)	31 March 2003 (aged 22)	Leicester Tigers	5	0
PR	Billy Keast	(England)	24 November 1996 (aged 28)	Exeter Chiefs	4	0
PR	Cam Miell	(England)	24 November 1996 (aged 28)	Exeter Chiefs	4	0
PR	Livai Natave	(Fiji)	9 May 2004 (aged 21)	Leicester Tigers (Loan)	3	5
PR	Harry Olding	(Wales)	-	Bridgend Ravens (Loan)	-	-
PR	Callum Smyth	(Scotland)	4 February 2004 (aged 21)	Glasgow Warriors	–	–
PR	Mikey Summerfield	(England)	21 May 2002 (aged 23)	Bath Rugby (Loan)	3	0
Second row
LK	Hallam Chapman	(England)	1 October 1997 (aged 27)	Harlequins	5	0
LK	Harvey Cuckson	(England)	16 January 2004 (aged 21)	Bath Rugby (Loan)	2	5
LK	Tom Golder	(Wales)	18 May 2004 (aged 21)	Exeter Chiefs	2	0
LK	Côme Joussain	(France)	18 January 2001 (aged 24)	Leicester Tigers	1	0
LK	Obinna Nkwocha	(England)	20 December 2002 (aged 22)	Coventry RFC	–	–
LK	James Tyas	(Scotland)	12 November 1991 (aged 33)	Coventry RFC	–	–
Back row
BR	Khalik Kareem	(England)	11 June 2004 (aged 21)	Bath Rugby	5	0
BR	Tim Anstee	(Australia)	19 May 1997 (aged 28)	RFC Los Angeles	5	15
BR	Tom Cowan	(Wales)	2 August 2002 (aged 23)	Bath Rugby	–	–
BR	Will Jeanes	(England)	12 February 2004 (aged 21)	Bath Rugby (Loan)	2	0
BR	Matt Kvesic	(England)	14 April 1992 (aged 33)	Coventry RFC	50	30
BR	Thabo Ndimande	(South Africa)	27 March 2000 (aged 25)	Griquas	5	0
BR	Matt Rogerson ©	(England)	29 June 1993 (aged 32)	Leicester Tigers	1	0
BR	Huw Taylor	(England)	5 June 1996 (aged 29)	Seattle Seawolves	20	0
BR	George Young	(Wales)	10 October 2001 (aged 23)	Dragons	2	0

=== Backs ===
Pos	Name	Nat	Date of birth (age)	Signed from	App	Pts
Half-backs
SH	Jake Garside	(England)	1 September 2002 (aged 23)	Northampton Saints	5	15
SH	Will Lane	(England)	12 April 2000 (aged 25)	Coventry RFC	3	5
SH	Lloyd Williams	(Wales)	30 November 1989 (aged 35)	Ealing Trailfinders	4	5
FH	Tiff Eden	(England)	16 October 1994 (aged 30)	Saracens	13	40
FH	Will Reed	(Wales)	3 November 2001 (aged 23)	Dragons RFC	5	18
Three-quarters
CE	Tom Hendrickson	(New Zealand)	1 September 1994 (aged 31)	North Harbour	0	0
CE	Chris Preen	(England)	12 September 2002 (aged 22)	Loughborough Students	1	0
CE	Tom Seabrook	(England)	15 February 1999 (aged 26)	Northampton Saints	5	5
CE	James Short	(England)	30 May 2005 (aged 20)	Bath Rugby	2	0
CE	Rory Taylor	(England)	31 October 2004 (aged 20)	Gloucester Rugby	–	–
CE	Billy Twelvetrees	(England)	15 November 1988 (aged 36)	-	5	10
WG	Josh Bassett	(England)	17 March 1992 (aged 33)	Leicester Tigers	–	–
WG	Alfie Garside	(England)	28 October 2000 (aged 24)	Bedford Blues	4	10
WG	Juan González	(Uruguay)	12 April 2003 (aged 22)	Peñarol Rugby	3	0
WG	Siva Naulago	(Fiji)	6 August 1991 (aged 34)	Bristol Bears	–	–
WG	Roma Zheng	(England)	18 October 2001 (aged 23)	Harlequins	2	10
FB	Louis Brown	(England)	17 February 1998 (aged 27)	Newcastle Falcons	2	0
FB	Will Trewin	(England)	2 May 1999 (aged 26)	Cornish Pirates	2	15

Note: Ages are correct as of September 1, 2025.
Stats are correct as of October 25, 2025 (Matchday #04).

=== Coaching staff ===
Position	Name
Head coach	(England) Matt Everard
Assistant coach	(England) Tom Cruse
Head of Rugby Conditioning	(England) Sam Handy
Head of Strength & Power Conditioning	(England) Will Cusack
Player coach	(England) Billy Twelvetrees

== Season results ==
Preseason

13 September 2025	Ampthill	12–54	Worcester Warriors	Dillingham Park
15:00 BST	Try: Cullen 28' c Strachan 38' m Con: Grimoldby (1/2) 28'		Try: Lane 3' c A. Garside 10' m Ndimande 15' c 22' c Short 31' c Bassett 55' c 71' c Vanes 78' c Con: Reed (4/5) 3' 15' 22' 31'; Eden (3/3) 55' 71' 78'	Attendance: 1,432

19 September 2025	Worcester Warriors	19–33	Bath	Sixways Stadium
19:45 BST	Try: Brown 3' c Seabrook 38' c Trewin 80' m Con: Eden (2/2) 3' 38'; Reed (0/1)		Try: Pepper 11' c Spencer 16' m 42' c Dunn 56' c Sela 69' c Con: Spencer (2/3) 11' 42' de Glanville (2/2) 56' 69'

2025–26 Champ Rugby
Pos	Team	Pld	W	D	L	PF	PA	PD	TF	TA	TB	LB	Pts	Qualification
1	Ealing Trailfinders	13	13	0	0	580	209	+371	88	32	12	0	64	Play-off semi-finals
2	Bedford Blues	12	9	1	2	390	285	+105	58	38	11	1	50	Play-off semi-finals
3	Worcester Warriors	13	8	0	5	444	318	+126	68	41	11	4	47	Play-off quarter-finals
4	Coventry	13	8	0	5	497	385	+112	73	55	11	2	45	Play-off quarter-finals
5	Hartpury University	13	8	1	4	373	338	+35	49	52	7	1	42	Play-off quarter-finals
6	Chinnor	12	8	0	4	319	265	+54	44	36	5	3	40	Play-off quarter-finals
7	Nottingham	13	6	1	6	345	317	+28	55	48	10	4	40	
8	Caldy	13	6	0	7	309	351	−42	48	45	8	2	34	
9	Ampthill	13	6	0	7	334	497	−163	47	76	8	2	34	
10	Cornish Pirates	13	5	1	7	345	343	+2	51	50	8	4	34	
11	Doncaster Knights	13	4	2	7	328	342	−14	42	43	6	3	29	
12	Richmond	13	3	0	10	267	356	−89	38	52	2	4	18	Relegation play-off
13	London Scottish	13	3	0	10	252	411	−159	32	59	4	2	18	Relegation play-off
14	Cambridge	13	0	0	13	233	596	−363	36	91	5	2	7	Relegated

Updated to match(es) played on 17 October 2025. Source: Official fixtures

Results

Round	1	2	3	4	5	6	7	8	9	10	11	12	13	14	15	16	17	18	19	20	21	22	23	24	25	26
Venue	H	A	H	A	H	A	H	A	H	H	A	H	A	H	A	H	A	H	A	H	A	A	H	A	H	A
Result	W	L	W	L	W	W	W	W	W	W	L	L	L	-	-	-	-	-	-	-	-	-	-	-	-	-
Position	5	6	3	4	4	2	2	2	2	2	3	3	3	-	-	-	-	-	-	-	-	-	-	-	-	-

Source: Champ Rugby
A = Away; H = Home; W = Win; D = Draw; L = Loss; P = Postponed

4 October 2025	Worcester Warriors	29-19 TB	Coventry	Sixways Stadium
14:00 BST	Try: Reed 14' c Seabrook 47' c Kvesic 57' m Challenger 80' c Con: Reed (3/4) 15' 48' 80'; Pen: Reed (1/1) 78'		Try: Nayalo 11' c Sullivan 23' c Opoku 28' m Con: Thomas (2/3) 12' 24'	Attendance: 12,067; Referee: Hamish Grant

11 October 2025	Hartpury	28-25 TB LB	Worcester Warriors	Hartpury Stadium
14:30 BST	Try: Holiday 9' m Morgan 56' c Trevett 66' c Con: Bazalgette (2/3) 56' 66'; Pen: Bazalgette (3/3) 24' 54' 61'		Try: Zheng 14' m 74' m Williams 40' m Cuckson 45' m Con: Reed (1/4) 45'; Pen: Eden 69'	Attendance: 2,000; Referee: Andy Wigley

17 October 2025	Worcester Warriors	56-28 TB	Ampthill	Sixways Stadium
19:45 BST	Try: Spandler 5' c 22' c Kvesic 35' c 80' c Trewin 40' c 53' c Eden 42' c Anstee 50' c Con: Eden (8/8) 5' 23' 35' 40' 42' 50' 53' 80'		Try: Wilson 16' c 20' c Auvaa 28' c Cullen 65' c Con: Grimoldby (3/3) 16' 20' 28'; Barton (1/1) 65'	Attendance: 7,250; Referee: Benjamin Wood

25 October 2025	Doncaster Knights	34-31 TB LB	Worcester Warriors	Castle Park
14:30 BST	Try: Edwards 32' c Rokoduguni 76' c Olowofela 80' m Con: Bennett (2/3) 32' 77'; Pen: Bennett 2' 11' 20' 26' 38'		Try: Trewin 15' c Anstee 46' m J. Garside 54' c 70' m Twelvetrees 78' c Con: Eden (3/5) 15' 54' 78'	Attendance: 2,087; Referee: Hamish Smales

31 October 2025	Worcester Warriors	52-19 TB	London Scottish	Sixways Stadium
19:45 GMT	Try: Lane 2' c Anstee 7' c Twelvetrees 9' c J. Garside 26' c Brown 31' c 80' m Natave 55' m Reed 62' c Con: Eden (5/5) 3' 8' 10' 27' 32'; Reed (1/3) 63'		Try: Ferdinand 37' c Clayton 60' c Wright 79' m Con: Honey (1/1) 38'; Wilstead (1/2)61' 80'	Attendance: 8,900; Referee: Hamish Grant

8 November 2025	Caldy	15-17	Worcester Warriors	Paton Field
14:00 GMT	Try: Tudor 6' c Hyde 26' m Con: Wilkinson (1/2) 6'; Pen: Wilkinson 16'		Try: Biggs 12' c J. Garside 70' m 80' m Con: Eden (1/3) 12'	Attendance: 1,876; Referee: Jonathan Cook

15 November 2025	Worcester Warriors	24-22 TB	Nottingham	Sixways Stadium
15:00 GMT	Try: Williams 8' c Seabrook 52' m 64' c Challenger 80' m Con: Eden (1/2) 5'; Reed (1/2) 64'		Try: Green 14' c Cherry 46' m 50' c Con: Parks (2/3) 14' 50'; Pen: Parks 57'	Attendance: 6,500; Referee: Sara Cox

29 November 2025	Cambridge	14-61 TB	Worcester Warriors	Grantchester Road
14:00 GMT	Try: Caven 20' c Qainuci 22' c Con: Mausia (2/2) 20' 22'		Try: J. Garside 25' c 45' c 56' c Wallis 31' c Tyas 47' c Trewin 53' c Eden 61' c Kvesic 64' c Anstee 69' m Con: Reed (8/9) 25' 31' 45' 47' 53' 56' 61' 64'	Attendance: 1,329; Referee: Michael Lamb

6 December 2025	Worcester Warriors	40-24 TB	Cornish Pirates	Sixways Stadium
15:00 GMT	Try: Trewin 17' m Gonzalez 21' c Eden 26' c Kareem 32' c 57' c Reed 50' c Con: Reed (5/6) 22' 26' 32' 50' 57'		Try: King 12' m Hiscocks 19' c 63' c Yates 74' m Con: Sinclair (2/4) 20' 63'	Referee: Benjamin Wood

13 December 2025	Worcester Warriors	31-19 TB	Richmond	Sixways Stadium
14:00 GMT	Try: Reed 24' c Anstee 30'c Zheng 34' c Spandler 43' m Short 69' m Con: Eden (3/5) 25' 31' 35'		Try: Jones 14' m Dennett 47' c Langston 76' c Con: Grieve (2/3) 48' 77'	Attendance: 6,200; Referee: Benjamin Wood

20 December 2025	Bedford Blues	35-19	Worcester Warriors	Goldington Road
15:00 BST	Try: Le Bourgeois 5' c 9' c James 37' c 40' c Uru 56' c Con: Maisey (5/5) 5' 10' 37' 40' 56'		Try: Gonzalez 53' m Reed 77' c Short 80' c Con: Reed (0/1); Eden 78' 80'(2/2)	Attendance: 3,277; Referee: George Selwood

27 December 2025	Worcester Warriors	26-27 TB LB	Chinnor	Sixways Stadium
15:00 BST	Try: Kareem 1' c J. Garside 25' m 46' c Jeanes 33' c Con: Reed (3/4) 2' 34' 47'		Try: Walker 13' m 51' m Dugmore 19' m Cave 39' c Hanks 41' m Con: Chamberlain (1/5) 39'	Attendance: 9,500; Referee: Harry Walbaum

3 January 2026	Ealing Trailfinders	34-33 TB LB	Worcester Warriors	Trailfinders Sports Ground
15:00 BST	Try: Buckley 9' m 49' m Moore 11' c Taylor 36' c Hampson 69 c Con: D. Jones (3/5) 11' 36' 69'; Pen: D. Jones 24'		Try: Twelvetrees 14' c Wallis 20' m Nkwocha 25' c Bassett 40' c Zheng 65' c Con: Reed (4/5) 14' 25' 40' 65'	Attendance: 3,000; Referee: Adam Leal

24 January 2026	Worcester Warriors	vs.	Hartpury	Sixways Stadium
00:00 BST (tbc)

31 January 2026	Ampthill	vs.	Worcester Warriors	Dillingham Park
00:00 BST (tbc)

7 February 2026	Worcester Warriors	vs.	Doncaster Knights	Sixways Stadium
00:00 BST (tbc)

14 February 2026	London Scottish	vs.	Worcester Warriors	Athletic Ground
00:00 BST (tbc)

21 February 2026	Worcester Warriors	vs.	Caldy	Sixways Stadium
00:00 BST (tbc)

28 February 2026	Nottingham	vs.	Worcester Warriors	Lady Bar Sports Ground
00:00 BST (tbc)

21 March 2026	Worcester Warriors	vs.	Cambridge	Sixways Stadium
00:00 BST (tbc)

28 March 2026	Cornish Pirates	vs.	Worcester Warriors	Mennaye Field
00:00 BST (tbc)

4 April 2026	Richmond	vs.	Worcester Warriors	Athletic Ground
00:00 BST (tbc)

11 April 2026	Worcester Warriors	vs.	Bedford Blues	Sixways Stadium
00:00 BST (tbc)

18 April 2026	Chinnor	vs.	Worcester Warriors	Kingsey Road
00:00 BST (tbc)

2 May 2026	Worcester Warriors	vs.	Ealing Trailfinders	Sixways Stadium
00:00 BST (tbc)

9 May 2026	Coventry	vs.	Worcester Warriors	Butts Park Arena
00:00 BST (tbc)

Championship results matrix
	AMP	BED	CAL	CAM	CHI	COR	COV	DON	EAL	HAR	LON	NOT	RIC	WOR
AMP		12-66				26-21			0-71	21-31	38-32	36-27		#15
BED			20-8	29-28			#14	36-32	22-50	38-30			33-10	35-19
CAL	34-29			41-24	28-36		22-33				26-10	#15	27-21	15-17
CAM	24-45				15-55		19-33	#14			15-38	32-36	5-54	14-61
CHI	17-10	P				47-10	47-26		#14		22-20	6-11		
COR	#14	26-27	34–27	52-0				15-15	14-41	21-22			28-19	
COV	68-26	35-30			#15	41-26			36–63		61-10	41-36		
DON	30-38		27-28	42-15	21-23	#15	24-21							34-31
EAL			38-0	68-17	55-7			35-21		27-19			#15	34-33
HAR		#15	38-22	42-22	25-19		36-31	33-33						28-25
LON		7-26		#15		10-38		34-10	14-38	24-33		7-26		
NOT		15-15	24-31			28-36		26-8	14-17	38-24	#14		29-27	
RIC	20-25		#14		18-13		17-52	7-31	12-43	17-12	26-27			
WOR	56-28				26-27	40-24	29-19			#14	52-19	24-22	31-19	

== Season stats ==
Matchday squads

Player	#01	#02	#03	#04	#05	#06	#07	#08	#09	#10	#11	#12	#13	#14	#15	#16	#17	#18	#19	#20	#21	#22	#23	#24	#25	#26
Anstee	6	4	5	6	5	6	6	5	5	6	-	-	-	-	-	-	-	-	-	-	-	-	-	-	-	-
Balmain	-	-	-	-	-	-	-	-	18	3	-	-	-	-	-	-	-	-	-	-	-	-	-	-	-	-
Bassett	-	-	-	-	-	-	-	-	-	-	-	-	-	-	-	-	-	-	-	-	-	-	-	-	-	-
Biggs	2	-	16	16	2	2	2	20	2	23	-	-	-	-	-	-	-	-	-	-	-	-	-	-	-	-
Brown	15	15	15	-	15	15	15	-	15	-	-	-	-	-	-	-	-	-	-	-	-	-	-	-	-	-
Challenger	18	18	3	18	3	3	3	-	-	-	-	-	-	-	-	-	-	-	-	-	-	-	-	-	-	-
Chapman	19	20	4	4	4	4	4	-	-	19	-	-	-	-	-	-	-	-	-	-	-	-	-	-	-	-
Cowan	-	-	-	-	-	-	-	6	20	-	-	-	-	-	-	-	-	-	-	-	-	-	-	-	-	-
Cuckson	5	5	-	-	-	-	-	-	-	-	-	-	-	-	-	-	-	-	-	-	-	-	-	-	-	-
Eden	-	-	10	10	10	10	10	22	22	10	-	-	-	-	-	-	-	-	-	-	-	-	-	-	-	-
Evans	-	-	-	-	-	5	19	-	-	-	-	-	-	-	-	-	-	-	-	-	-	-	-	-	-	-
Garside, A.	11	11	23	11	-	-	-	-	-	-	-	-	-	-	-	-	-	-	-	-	-	-	-	-	-	-
Garside, J.	21	21	9	14	14	14	14	14	-	21	-	-	-	-	-	-	-	-	-	-	-	-	-	-	-	-
Golder	-	-	-	19	19	-	-	-	-	-	-	-	-	-	-	-	-	-	-	-	-	-	-	-	-	-
González	-	-	14	23	11	-	11	-	14	-	-	-	-	-	-	-	-	-	-	-	-	-	-	-	-	-
Haynes	-	-	-	-	-	18	18	18	-	1	-	-	-	-	-	-	-	-	-	-	-	-	-	-	-	-
Hendrickson	-	-	-	-	-	-	-	-	13	13	-	-	-	-	-	-	-	-	-	-	-	-	-	-	-	-
Hoyt	3	3	18	3	18	-	-	3	3	-	-	-	-	-	-	-	-	-	-	-	-	-	-	-	-	-
Jeanes	-	-	19	5	-	-	-	-	-	-	-	-	-	-	-	-	-	-	-	-	-	-	-	-	-	-
Joussain	4	19	-	-	-	-	-	-	-	-	-	-	-	-	-	-	-	-	-	-	-	-	-	-	-	-
Kareem	23	8	8	8	8	8	20	19	8	20	-	-	-	-	-	-	-	-	-	-	-	-	-	-	-	-
Keast	1	-	17	17	1	1	1	1	1	-	-	-	-	-	-	-	-	-	-	-	-	-	-	-	-	-
Kvesic	7	7	7	7	6	7	8	8	6	8	-	-	-	-	-	-	-	-	-	-	-	-	-	-	-	-
Lane	-	-	21	21	9	9	21	9	21	9	-	-	-	-	-	-	-	-	-	-	-	-	-	-	-	-
Miell	-	-	-	-	-	-	-	17	17	18	-	-	-	-	-	-	-	-	-	-	-	-	-	-	-	-
Natave	17	1	-	-	17	17	-	-	-	17	-	-	-	-	-	-	-	-	-	-	-	-	-	-	-	-
Naulago	-	-	-	-	-	-	-	-	-	-	-	-	-	-	-	-	-	-	-	-	-	-	-	-	-	-
Ndimande	20	23	20	20	7	20	7	7	7	7	-	-	-	-	-	-	-	-	-	-	-	-	-	-	-	-
Nkwocha	-	-	-	-	-	-	-	-	19	4	-	-	-	-	-	-	-	-	-	-	-	-	-	-	-	-
Olding	-	-	-	-	-	-	17	-	-	-	-	-	-	-	-	-	-	-	-	-	-	-	-	-	-	-
Preen	-	-	-	-	23	23	-	-	-	-	-	-	-	-	-	-	-	-	-	-	-	-	-	-	-	-
Reed	10	10	22	22	22	22	22	10	10	15	-	-	-	-	-	-	-	-	-	-	-	-	-	-	-	-
Rogerson	8	-	-	-	-	-	-	-	-	-	-	-	-	-	-	-	-	-	-	-	-	-	-	-	-	-
Seabrook	13	22	13	13	13	13	13	12	-	22	-	-	-	-	-	-	-	-	-	-	-	-	-	-	-	-
Short	22	13	-	-	-	-	-	13	-	11	-	-	-	-	-	-	-	-	-	-	-	-	-	-	-	-
Smyth	-	-	-	-	-	-	-	-	-	-	-	-	-	-	-	-	-	-	-	-	-	-	-	-	-	-
Spandler	-	16	2	2	-	-	-	16	16	2	-	-	-	-	-	-	-	-	-	-	-	-	-	-	-	-
Summerfield	-	17	1	1	-	-	-	-	-	-	-	-	-	-	-	-	-	-	-	-	-	-	-	-	-	-
Taylor, H.	-	-	-	-	20	19	5	-	-	-	-	-	-	-	-	-	-	-	-	-	-	-	-	-	-	-
Taylor, R.	-	-	-	-	-	12	12	23	12	-	-	-	-	-	-	-	-	-	-	-	-	-	-	-	-	-
Trewin	-	-	11	15	-	11	23	15	11	-	-	-	-	-	-	-	-	-	-	-	-	-	-	-	-	-
Twelvetrees	12	12	12	12	12	-	-	-	-	12	-	-	-	-	-	-	-	-	-	-	-	-	-	-	-	-
Tyas	-	-	-	-	-	-	-	4	4	5	-	-	-	-	-	-	-	-	-	-	-	-	-	-	-	-
Vanes	-	-	-	-	-	-	-	-	-	-	-	-	-	-	-	-	-	-	-	-	-	-	-	-	-	-
Wallis	16	2	-	-	16	16	16	2	23	16	-	-	-	-	-	-	-	-	-	-	-	-	-	-	-	-
Williams	9	9	-	9	21	21	9	21	9	-	-	-	-	-	-	-	-	-	-	-	-	-	-	-	-	-
Young	-	6	6	-	-	-	-	-	-	-	-	-	-	-	-	-	-	-	-	-	-	-	-	-	-	-
Zheng	14	14	-	-	-	-	-	11	-	14	-	-	-	-	-	-	-	-	-	-	-	-	-	-	-	-

Statistics

Player	SQD	APP	FXV	REP	TRY	DPK	PKS	CVS	CVM	PTS	Booked	Sent off (straight red)
Anstee	10	10	10	-	5	-	-	-	-	20	1	-
Balmain	2	2	1	1	-	-	-	-	-	0	-	-
Bassett	-	-	-	-	-	-	-	-	-	0	-	-
Biggs	9	9	5	4	1	-	-	-	-	5	-	-
Brown	7	7	7	-	2	-	-	-	-	10	-	-
Challenger	7	7	4	3	2	-	-	-	-	5	-	-
Chapman	8	7	5	2	-	-	-	-	-	0	-	-
Cowan	2	2	1	1	-	-	-	-	-	-	-	-
Cuckson	2	2	2	-	-	1	-	-	-	3	-	-
Eden	9	9	6	3	1	1	1	21	5	53	-	-
Evans	2	2	1	1	-	-	-	-	-	0	-	-
Garside, A.	4	4	3	1	-	-	-	-	-	0	-	-
Garside, J.	9	9	6	3	7	-	-	-	-	35	-	-
Golder	1	-	-	-	-	-	-	-	-	0	-	-
González	5	5	4	1	1	-	-	-	-	5	-	-
Haynes	4	3	1	2	-	-	-	-	-	0	-	-
Hendrickson	2	2	2	-	-	-	-	-	-	0	-	-
Hoyt	7	7	5	2	-	-	-	-	-	0	-	-
Jeanes	2	2	1	1	-	-	-	-	-	0	-	-
Joussain	1	1	1	-	-	-	-	-	-	0	-	-
Kareem	10	9	6	3	2	-	-	-	-	10	-	-
Keast	8	8	6	2	-	-	-	-	-	0	-	-
Kvesic	10	10	10	-	4	-	-	-	-	20	-	-
Lane	8	7	4	3	1	-	-	-	-	5	-	-
Miell	3	3	-	3	-	-	-	-	-	-	-	-
Natave	5	5	1	4	1	-	-	-	-	5	-	-
Naulago	-	-	-	-	-	-	-	-	-	0	-	-
Ndimande	10	10	5	5	-	-	-	-	-	0	-	-
Nkwocha	2	2	1	1	-	-	-	-	-	0	-	-
Olding	1	1	-	1	-	-	-	-	-	0	-	-
Preen	2	1	-	1	-	-	-	-	-	0	-	-
Reed	10	10	5	5	3	-	2	19	9	57	-	-
Rogerson	1	1	1	-	-	-	-	-	-	0	-	-
Seabrook	9	9	7	2	3	-	-	-	-	5	-	-
Short	4	4	3	1	1	-	-	-	-	5	-	-
Smyth	-	-	-	-	-	-	-	-	-	0	-	-
Spandler	6	6	3	3	3	-	-	-	-	15	-	-
Summerfield	3	3	2	1	-	-	-	-	-	0	-	-
Taylor, H.	3	2	1	1	-	-	-	-	-	0	-	-
Taylor, R.	4	4	3	1	-	-	-	-	-	0	-	-
Trewin	6	6	5	1	6	-	-	-	-	30	-	-
Twelvetrees	6	6	6	-	1	-	-	-	-	5	-	-
Tyas	3	3	3	-	1	-	-	-	-	5	-	-
Vanes	-	-	-	-	-	-	-	-	-	0	-	-
Wallis	8	8	2	6	1	-	-	-	-	5	-	-
Williams	8	8	4	4	1	-	-	-	-	5	-	-
Young	2	2	2	-	-	-	-	-	-	0	-	-
Zheng	4	4	4	-	4	-	-	-	-	20	-	-

== See also ==
- Worcester Warriors
