= Worcester, Bosch Group =

Manufacturer of heating and hot water products

Worcester Bosch
- Industry: Heating
- Founded: September 1962
- Headquarters: Worcester, England
- Area served: United Kingdom and Ireland
- Key people: Cecil Duckworth (founder)
- Products: Boilers, solar panels, heat pumps
- Number of employees: 2,000+
- Parent: Robert Bosch GmbH
- Website: www.worcester-bosch.co.uk

Worcester Bosch (commonly referred to as Worcester) is a United Kingdom based manufacturer of heating and hot water products.

Headquartered in Warndon, a suburb of Worcester, the company employs more than 2,000 people across the headquarters and manufacturing plants in Worcester and Clay Cross, Derbyshire, including a network of over 300 service engineers and over 80 technically trained field sales managers.

== History ==
The company was founded by Cecil Duckworth in 1962 as Worcester Engineering Co Ltd, based at the Old Vinegar works in Worcester. Worcester's early success is attributed to the pioneering of combination boilers in the UK, further successful performance in the UK heating market led to the expansion and relocation of the factory to its current headquarters in Warndon in 1990.

Continued growth was followed by the acquisition by Robert Bosch GmbH in 1992, with the company changing its name to 'Worcester, Bosch Group'. As part of Bosch's heating technology subsidiary, Worcester is a brand of Bosch Thermotechnology Ltd, the collective name that refers to Worcester, Bosch Group and Buderus (acquired by Bosch in 2003).

Whilst Worcester's origins lie in oil and gas boilers, recent years have seen the company champion renewable technologies such as solar water heating, ground source and air source heat pumps. The company runs schemes such as the Environment 2020 awards to reward and promote energy efficiency and reinforce their commitment to being an "environmentally responsible manufacturer".

Worcester has been awarded the royal warrant by King Charles for supplying hot water products to the royal family. The company was also named as the most reliable boiler brand, by Which? Best Buy and have been endorsed by Which? for 16 years.

The company has strong connections to the Worcester Warriors Rugby club through their previous Chairman and founder Cecil Duckworth CBE, that was renewed in 2010 when Worcester was named as the Warriors shirt sponsor, up to the 2012-13 season. Worcester subsequently launched an engineering apprenticeship scheme, named in Cecil Duckworth's honour. In addition, in 2026 they began to sponsor Worcester City Women FC (WCWFC).

== Product portfolio ==
Worcester's product portfolio includes:

- Boilers fired by natural gas, heating oil and liquefied petroleum gas
- Solar water heating
- Geothermal heat pumps
- Air to air heat pumps
- Air to water heat pumps
- Air conditioning

Worcester's gas, oil and LPG ranges consist of regular boilers, combination boilers and system boilers; these are wall-hung, floor-standing or externally sited.

Worcester's solar water heating range was released in 2005, with the ground source heat pump range being released in 2007 and the air source heat pump range being released in 2008.

== Installation ==
Worcester operates a loyalty scheme known as the Worcester Accredited Installer scheme. Worcester Accredited Installers "specialise in Worcester products and can offer extended warranties" and benefit from features such as the online 'Find an Installer' search. Worcester Accredited Installers are experienced in fitting Worcester products but are not employed by Worcester. Worcester specifies that all members of the Worcester Accredited Installer scheme are Gas Safe Registered.

== Leadership ==
Worcester Bosch is led by Chief Executive Officer Carl Arntzen. In December 2025 it was announced that Carl Arntzen would retire at the end of March 2026, with Jo Shepherd, current sales and marketing director, appointed to succeed him.

== Company premises ==
In 2009 it was announced that the company had applied for planning permission to relocate its Warndon headquarters to a new site near junction 6 of the M5. In an interview, the leader of the Wychavon District Council provided some support for the proposed move, stating "Strategically, Wychavon recognises the absolute necessity to retain Bosch and formulate its expansion in the Worcester area." However, in 2012, it was reported that the company would not be relocating, for economic reasons. Three years later, the company opened a new distribution centre in Warndon, which consolidated two previous sites.

== Controversies ==
In May 2018, a data breach inadvertently revealed the home addresses of “tens of thousands” of Worcester customers.

In August 2024, the company agreed to a number of commitments, further to a Competition and Markets Authority case, that examined how they were marketing some boilers. The case was subsequently closed.
