= Cecil Duckworth =

British businessman (1937–2020)

Cecil Duckworth CBE (1937 – 15 November 2020) was an English businessman and the founder of Worcester Bosch and executive chairman of Rugby Union team Worcester Warriors. He also founded the Worcestershire Duckworth Trust, a Worcestershire charity that helps to relieve poverty and promote environmental conservation.

== Biography ==
=== Personal life and career ===
Cecil Duckworth was born in Macclesfield, Cheshire in 1937. He died on 15 November 2020. He moved to Worcester in 1958 having secured a five-year apprenticeship with Redman Engineering. He qualified as a mechanical engineer in 1961.

Duckworth started Worcester Engineering Co. Ltd. in 1962. The company grew slowly at first until Duckworth introduced the first combination boilers in 1970. The popularity of his new type of heating system saw his business expand rapidly. He sold the company to the Bosch Group in 1992, personally earning around £30 million, though he remained with the company. After a year as president of the Bosch Heating Division Duckworth retired in 1996. He is recognised as being the first non-German to head an operation within the Bosch Group.

Throughout his career Duckworth has assisted education and health establishments in Worcester. He was a governor at Worcester Sixth Form College and served as the chairman of the South Worcestershire Community Healthcare NHS Trust.

Duckworth owned the property group CD Developments and in 2009 was estimated to be worth around £40 million. He has been referred to in the Malvern Gazette as Worcester's "most successful businessman of the last 50 years". He published the autobiography Worcester Warrior in 2012.

In 2013 Duckworth was appointed a CBE in the Queen's Birthday Honours list for his charity contributions to the Worcestershire community. This followed the OBE he received in 2004 for services to the community and to rugby. He was awarded the status of honorary freeman of Worcester in 2008.

=== Rugby and charity ===
Having retired from Worcester Bosch in 1996 Duckworth had time to turn his attentions elsewhere. In 1997 he began his association with Worcester Rugby Club, at the time a struggling Rugby Union team. With his direct support as executive chairman backed up by significant financial investment the team quickly advanced through the leagues. In 2004 Worcester Warriors – as they are now called – were promoted to the English Premiership, having risen through six divisions since Duckworth became involved with the team, and have spent the majority of seasons since in the Premiership. The Rugby Football Union appointed Duckworth to the "Image of the Game" task force in 2009.

Duckworth was involved with several charitable organisations, setting up the Worcestershire Duckworth Trust in 1998. The Trust aims to help relieve poverty in Worcestershire as well as aid conservation projects that enhance the environment around Worcestershire. He was also one of the original benefactors of Acorns Children's Hospice in Worcester and a trustee of the Wooden Spoon Society.
