= Will Jeanes =

English rugby union player

- Born: 12 February 2004 (age 22)
- Height: 2.00 m (6 ft 7 in)
- Weight: 110 kg (17 st 5 lb; 243 lb)
- School: Beechen Cliff School
- University: University of Bath

Rugby union career
- Position: Flanker
- Current team: Bath
Amateur team(s)
Years	Team	Apps	(Points)
- Taunton
Senior career
Years	Team	Apps	(Points)
2024–	Bath	13	(0)
2025	→ Worcester Warriors (loan)	4	(5)

Will Jeanes (born 12 February 2004) is an English professional rugby union footballer who plays as a Flanker for Bath Rugby.

== Early life ==
Jeanes grew up in Chard, Somerset before moving towards Taunton. He then attended sixth form at Beechen Cliff School in Bath. He joined the Bath Rugby pathway system and also became a student of Sports Performance at the University of Bath where his performances for the first-XV rugby union team in British Universities and Colleges Sport (BUCS) exploits earned him a call-up for England Students in 2024.

== Career ==
He played for Taunton R.F.C. and Bath Rugby under-18s prior being promoted to the senior Academy at Bath Rugby as an 18 year-old in June 2022.

He featured for Bath in the Premiership Rugby Cup during the 2024-25 season, making his debut in a 73-0 win against Ampthill RUFC in November 2024.

In March 2025, he started the final as Bath beat Exeter Chiefs 48-14 to win the 2024-25 Premiership Rugby Cup. In May 2025, he had his contract extended by Bath.

In October 2025, he joined the newly-reformed Worcester Warriors on loan to play in the RFU Championship, and made his debut off the bench against Ampthill.
