= Matt Everard =

Matthew Everard
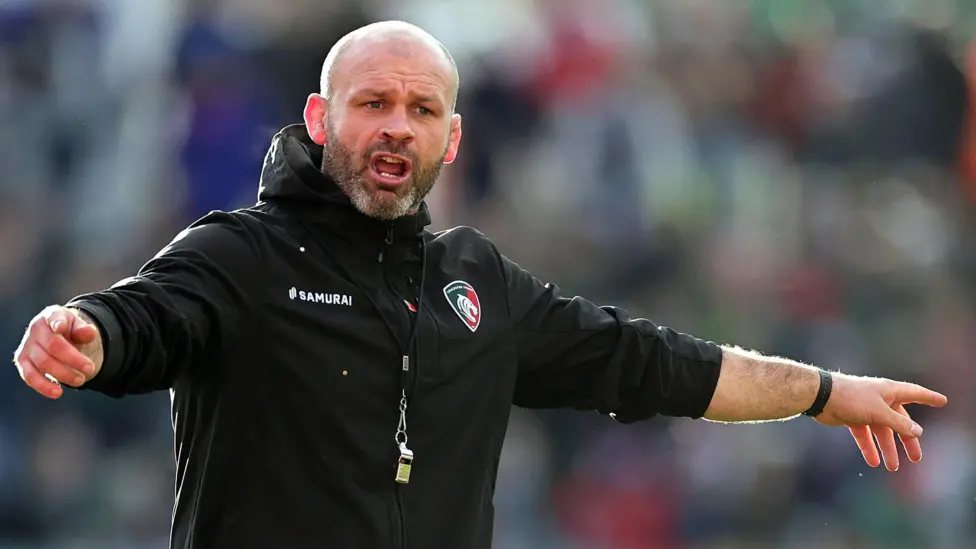
- Born: 9 January 1991 (age 35) Leicester
- Height: 182 cm (6 ft 0 in)
- Weight: 97 kg (15 st 4 lb)
- School: Loughborough Grammar School

Rugby union career
- Position: Back Row
Senior career
Years	Team	Apps	(Points)
2009–2011	Leicester Tigers	3	(0)
2011–2014	Wasps	37	
2014–2017	Nottingham	92	(35)
International career
Years	Team	Apps	(Points)
2011	England U20		
Coaching career
- Years: Team
- 2017–2022: Wasps (assistant)
- 2022–2025: Leicester Tigers (assistant)
- 2025–: Worcester Warriors

Matt Everard (born 9 January 1991) is a rugby union coach and former professional player. He is currently the Head Coach at Worcester Warriors, since being appointed 13 May 2025. He had been stood down as defence coach at Leicester Tigers in the middle of the 2024/25 season despite statistically having the best defence in the Premiership across two consecutive seasons. 22/23 & 23/24

He previously worked in a coaching role at Wasps RFC, after retiring from playing for Nottingham in 2017 where he was captain, and played in the back row. He was previously the director of rugby for Long Eaton RFC where he was assisted by former Nottingham teammates Murray McConnell and Tom Holmes.

On 15 Feb 2018 Matt announced his retirement from playing at the end of the 2017/18 season in order to concentrate on his coaching career.

== Previous career ==
During his playing career, Everard had a lengthy career with spells at Nottingham, Leicester Tigers and Wasps where he was signed after impressing at England under 20 level.

== Education ==
Everard attended Loughborough Grammar School, where he still retains strong links, organising the annual "Robbie's Rugby Festival", hosted at the school in aid of The Robbie Anderson Cancer Trust and The Jake McCarthy Foundation
