= Billy Keast =

English rugby union player

- Born: Billy Keast; 24 November 1996 (age 29) Truro, Cornwall, England
- Height: 1.84 m (6 ft 0 in)
- Weight: 114 kg (251 lb)
- School: Truro College

Rugby union career
- Position: Loosehead Prop
Senior career
Years	Team	Apps	(Points)
2016-2025	Exeter Chiefs	53	(15)
2017-2018	→ Cornish Pirates (D/R)	37	(0)
2025–	Worcester Warriors	11	(0)

Billy Keast (born 24 November 1996) is an English professional rugby union player for Worcester Warriors. He predominantly plays as a loosehead prop but had played as a tighthead prop until he was 21.

Keast's father, Richard, played prop for Redruth and Cornwall. Keast was educated at Truro College. He represented England at U18 and U20 Rugby. He was part of the 2016 England U20 Junior World Cup winning squad.

Keast plays for Premiership Rugby side the Exeter Chiefs. In November 2016 he made his Chiefs debut in an Anglo-Welsh Cup clash away to Harlequins. Keast started in the same competition a week later as the Chiefs beat Cardiff Blues 62–25 at Sandy Park. In 2016 he played for Redruth on loan, and in August 2017 he joined the Cornish Pirates on loan. He played regularly during the Chiefs 2020 double winning season.

On 29 May 2025, Keast would leave Exeter to sign for Worcester Warriors who make their return to professional competition in the Champ Rugby from the 2025-26 season.
