= George Young (rugby union) =

Welsh rugby union player

- Born: George Young; 10 October 2001 (age 25) Newport, Wales
- Height: 192 cm (6 ft 4 in)
- Weight: 108 kg (238 lb)

Rugby union career
- Position: Flanker
- Current team: Dragons
Senior career
| Years | Team | Apps | (Points) |
| 2021–2025 | Newport RFC | 31 | (0) |
| 2021–2025 | Dragons | 13 | (5) |
| 2025– | Worcester Warriors | 2 | (0) |
- Correct as of 23 May 2025

George Young (born 10 October 2001) is a Welsh rugby union player for Worcester Warriors in the Champ Rugby. His primary position is flanker.

== Professional career ==
Young was named in the Dragons academy squad for the 2021–22 season. He made his debut for the Dragons in Round 12 of the 2021–22 United Rugby Championship against Ulster.

Young was released by the Dragons at the end of the 2024–25 United Rugby Championship season.

On 23 September 2025, Young was signed by Worcester Warriors as one of their new recruits in their return to professional competition in the Champ Rugby ahead of the 2025-26 season.
