= Malvern Gazette =

English local newspaper

- Type: Weekly newspaper
- Format: Tabloid
- Owner: Newsquest Media Group
- Founded: 1855
- Headquarters: Worcester; England, United Kingdom
- Circulation: 3,051 (average) (as of 2024)

The Malvern Gazette is a weekly tabloid newspaper published every Friday in Malvern, England. Its offices are based in Hylton Road, Worcester. The newspaper covers events across the county of Worcestershire as well as some on the outskirts of Herefordshire. There is also a sister title called the Ledbury Reporter.

The newspaper's first issue was published on 29 April 1898. In 1938 on the death of the founder, M T Stevens, the newspaper was purchased by Berrows of the Berrow's Worcester Journal and is currently owned by the Newsquest Media Group with a weekly circulation average of 3,051 January - December 2024 February 2025.
