= Roma Zheng =

English rugby union player

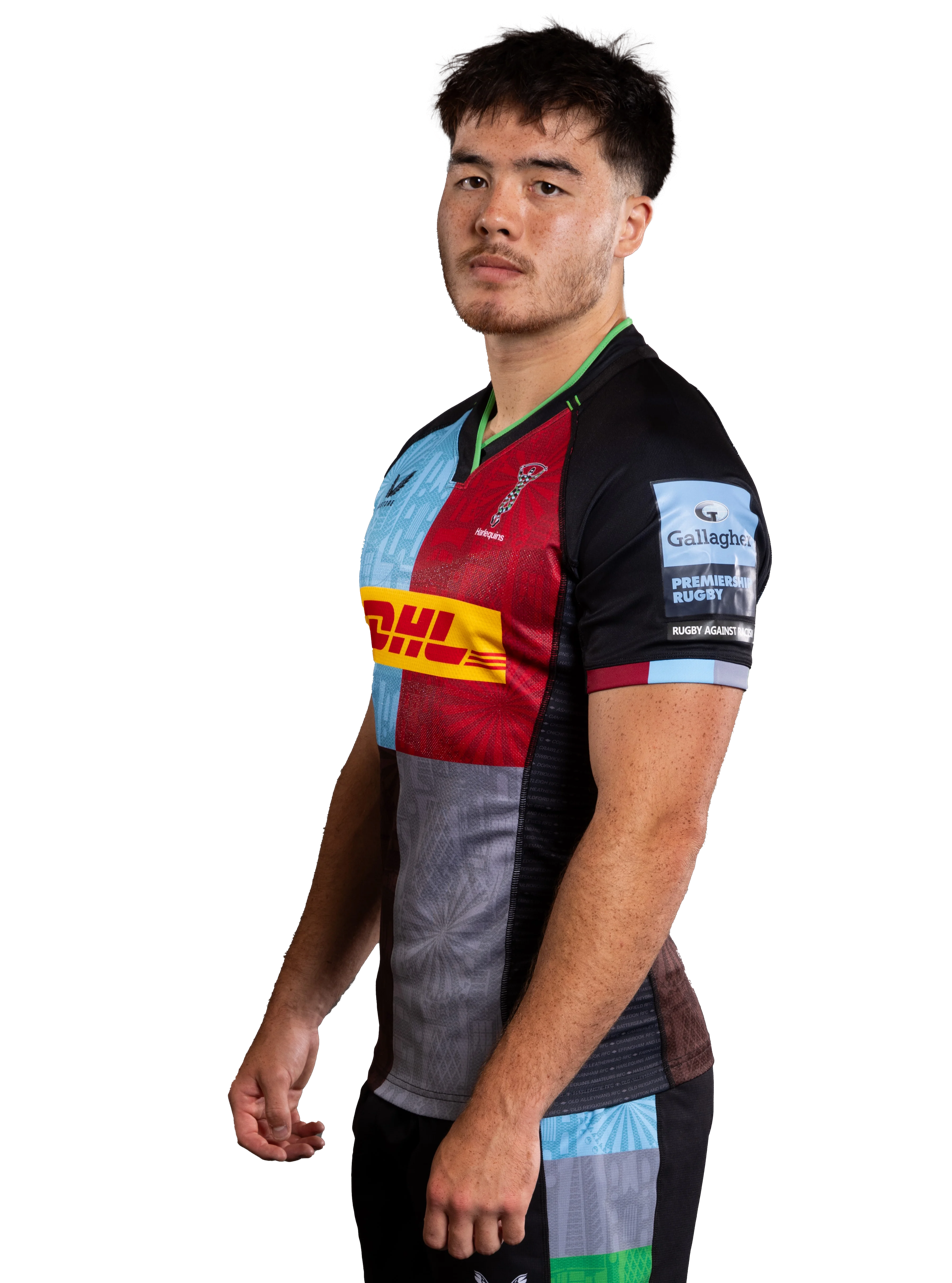
- Born: 18 October 2001 (age 25) Warrington, England
- Height: 1.86 m (6 ft 1 in)
- Weight: 99 kg (15 st 8 lb; 218 lb)
- University: Cardiff Metropolitan University

Rugby union career
- Position: Wing
- Current team: Worcester Warriors
Youth career
- Warrington RUFC
Senior career
Years	Team	Apps	(Points)
2020–2023	Cardiff Metropolitan University	55	(145)
2023–2025	Harlequins	3	(5)
2024–2025	→ London Scottish (loan)	17	(35)
2025-	Worcester Warriors	11	(40)
- Correct as of 08 July 2025
International career
Years	Team	Apps	(Points)
2022	England Students	1	(0)

Roma Zheng (born 18 October 2001) is an English professional rugby union who plays as a winger for Premiership Rugby club Worcester Warriors.

== Club career ==
Born in Warrington, Zheng played rugby for Warrington RUFC growing up where he played for the 1st XV once. Zheng had been part of the Sale Sharks pathway before being released at the end of his u18 year. In 2020 he began studying at Cardiff Metropolitan University where he played for the university's BUCS Super Rugby team, the national championship for university students in England. He was a standout for the team having scored 21 tries and beating 175 defenders n his first two years in the competition.

In June 2023, he signed an academy contract with Harlequins for the following season.

In September 2023, he made his debut off the bench for Harlequins against Hartpury University in the Premiership Rugby Cup. He scored in the 77th minute having replaced Oscar Beard as they won 54–14.

On 15 May 2025, Zheng would leave Harlequins to sign for re-vamped Worcester Warriors in the second-tier RFU Championship from the 2025–26 season.

== International career ==
In April 2022, Zheng was one of three players from Cardiff Metropolitan University selected to play for England Students against French Universities. England went on to win 16–15 at Kingston Park.

== Personal life ==
Zheng has three brothers, all of whom played rugby for Warrington RUFC and one sister.

Since 2020, alongside his rugby commitments, Zheng has been studying for a degree in Sports Coaching at Cardiff Metropolitan University. Having signed for Harlequins, he joins current squad members Alex Dombrandt and Luke Northmore as former attendees of the university.
