= Worcester Warriors =

Rugby union club in Worcester, England

- Full name: Worcester Warriors Rugby Football Club
- Union: North Midlands RFU
- Founded: 1871; 155 years ago Reformed: April 2025; 19 months ago
- Location: Worcester, England
- Ground: Sixways Stadium (Capacity: 9,500)
- Chairman: Chris Holland
- CEO: Stephen Vaughan
- Coach: Matt Everard
- Captain: Matt Kvesic
- League: Champ Rugby
- 2025–26: 4th of 14 (champions in play-offs)
Home kit	Away kit

Official website
- warriors.co.uk
- Current season

Worcester Warriors is a professional rugby union club based in Worcester, England. The side most recently played in Premiership Rugby, the top division of English rugby union, before being suspended by the RFU in September 2022 due to financial insolvency. Following a period of administration, the club was reformed as a new entity and play in Champ Rugby from the 2025–26 season.

== Overview ==
Using the colours gold and blue, they are based in Worcester, England. In 1975, the team moved to Sixways Stadium, located to the north of the city.

Placed in the eighth tier of English rugby with the advent of the English rugby union league competition, the club were able to build a strong team due to extensive financial support from their backer and chairman Cecil Duckworth, being promoted repeatedly through the league system. Worcester were first promoted to the highest tier, the Premiership, in 2004, and returned there on two occasions following relegation to the RFU Championship.

The Warriors have won one major trophy, the 2022 Premiership Cup, and won the second division four times in 2004, 2011, 2015, and Champ Rugby in 2026. They also won four titles in lower divisions while working their way through the English league structure.

In the 2021–22 Premiership Rugby season they finished 11th, entitling them to compete in the 2022–23 Premiership Rugby season and the 2022–23 European Rugby Challenge Cup.

The club entered administration on 26 September 2022 as a result of a tax dispute with the UK Government's tax authority, HM Revenue and Customs. The club was suspended from completing fixtures by the Rugby Football Union. The contracts of all players and coaching staff were terminated on 5 October 2022 following the granting of a winding-up petition from HMRC in the High Court. Prior to administration, their most recent director of rugby was Steve Diamond, who was appointed in January 2022.

The club owners at the time, James Sandford and Jim O'Toole, announced that the team might not play games again after the earlier administration. On 9 February 2023, it was announced that the club had been disbanded and that its administrators were trying unsuccessfully to make Stourbridge RFC play their games at Sixways Stadium in their place.

In April 2025, it was announced that Worcester would play in the new tier 2 league for the 2025–26 season. The new league would consist of 14 teams, including all 12 existing Championship clubs, the promoted National League 1 club (subject to meeting the league's Minimum Operating Standards), and the returning Worcester Warriors.

In May 2025, Matt Everard was appointed as Head Coach.

During the 2025/2026 season, Worcester won 15 and lost 11 of their 26 regular season games but won out the playoffs, beating Bedford Blues away at Goldington Road to secure the Champ title on their first outing since reforming.

== History ==
=== Foundation ===
The club was founded in 1871 by the Reverend Francis John Ede, with the first known game played against the Royal Artillery Rugby Club on 8 November 1871. This game was played on Pitchcroft. The club began playing at Bevere in Worcester in 1954 and left Bevere for Sixways in 1975 when the clubhouse was opened. When the league system was formed, the club was placed in North Midlands Division One, a level eight league.

=== Support ===
Due to extensive support from their backer Cecil Duckworth, the club were able to build a strong team, with promotion after promotion following. In 2006, extremely ambitious plans were announced for a £23 million development programme, which would see a health club with fitness centre and swimming pool, fully tarmacked park and ride area, and expanded capacity to 11,499.

=== Promotion to the Premiership ===
Worcester Warriors were promoted to the (then Zurich) Premiership after winning National Division One in 2003–04 with a perfect record of 26 wins from 26 games, something that had never before been achieved. They were the bookies', and many of the rugby pundits' odds-on-favourites to go straight back down but defied the odds to stay in the Premiership for another season, finishing ninth in the league, after wins against teams including Harlequins, Leeds, a historic victory against Premiership Champions London Wasps and Northampton in a 'winner takes all' end of season finale, which they won 21–19. This match was shown live with more twists and turns off the pitch as well as on it, with then Northampton player, Shane Drahm, who had signed for Worcester eventually starting, and successfully kicking almost everything, after press releases by Northampton stating that he would be a substitute. In the 2004–05 season, despite Premiership survival being their ultimate aim, they reached the final of the defunct European Shield at Oxford's Kassam Stadium, after beating Leeds Tykes in the semi-final. They eventually lost out to the French side Auch. They also managed to achieve a play-off match for the Heineken Cup against Saracens, but their long fight for Premiership survival and an injury-ravaged squad meant that they lost. Their achievements for that season meant that they had achieved much more than they had originally hoped for, as well as earning the respect of the other Premiership sides in the process.

In the 2005–06 season, they reached the quarter–finals of the European Challenge Cup after finishing top of their pool with five wins out of a possible six, above Connacht, Montpellier Hérault and Amatori Catania, and faced an away match against Northampton Saints on April Fool's Day, which they won, in what was described by sports writers as some of the best rugby they have played all season. They reached the semi – finals where they faced Gloucester Rugby in a local derby showdown, it being the third time they had played Gloucester that season, with the European match being played the week after the Premiership match at Kingsholm. Despite playing some thrilling rugby, and looking much more solid as a team than the previous week's Premiership performance, they were knocked out of the competition. The European Challenge Cup was then a much more important competition to Worcester as it offered them a route into the Heineken Cup. In the 2005–06 Guinness Premiership, they avoided relegation and were safe much earlier in the season, which meant that they avoided a repeat of last years relegation battle on the last day of the season. The season culminated in an eighth-place finish in the league on 47 points, one place higher than 2004–05, with the same number of wins (9) but more bonus points and a draw, missing 7th position due to Newcastle Falcons having a better points difference, secured on the last day of the season. This was a huge achievement considering that this is still only their second season in rugby's top flight.

In the 2006–07 season Worcester didn't get off to a very good start and for the majority of the season they were positioned in 12th place, but a good run of form which involved beating some of the top sides in the Premiership, helping them to avoid relegation and send the former Heineken Cup champions Northampton Saints down into National Division One.

=== Established in the Premiership ===
For the 2007–08 season Worcester had brought in several big name players, the best known being the All Black Rico Gear. But they again didn't start off very well in the Premiership and did not record their first victory until after Christmas. While they were struggling in the premiership they were enjoying good success in the European Challenge Cup (ECC), progressing through the group stages. After Christmas their premiership form picked up and they beat top teams such as Leicester Tigers and Sale Sharks, which subsequently saw them move out of the relegation zone, Leeds Carnegie replacing them. They progressed even further in the ECC and beat off Montpellier Hérault RC in the quarter-final and saw off Newcastle Falcons in the semi-final which set up a final against Bath. Leeds Carnegie could not survive relegation and were relegated well before the end of the season. The final against Bath resulted in a 24–16 defeat in a one-sided game.

In 2008 Worcester pulled off one of their largest signings ever by signing Australian international Chris Latham from the Queensland Reds, for the 2008–09 season on a three-year deal. The season again didn't go the way it was planned but Worcester still progressed in the ECC and pulled off home and away victories over local rivals Gloucester and London Wasps in the league. However the season ended disappointingly (after Worcester suffered a succession of serious injuries), losing in the semi-final of the European Challenge Cup to Bourgoin.

=== Relegation from the Premiership ===
After the disappointment of the 2008–09 Guinness Premiership season, the Warriors made a bright start to the 2009–10 Guinness Premiership season. Either side of a loss to Wasps, they had convincing wins over newly promoted Leeds Carnegie and over Sale Sharks, only their second home win over Sale since they joined the top flight in 2004–05, which was then followed by an unlucky loss at champions Leicester Tigers. A poor spell followed with 10 games without a win. During the winless spell, the club did become the first Premiership team to draw four games in a season and the first team to draw three successive league games. Following this bad spell, the Warriors secured a much needed 13–0 victory over Newcastle at Sixways, before another six consecutive losses. On 25 April, the Warriors were relegated from the Premiership after a 12–10 loss away to Leeds Carnegie, their first relegation in 22 years. They played the 2010–11 season in the Championship with Richard Hill as the new head coach, on a 2-year contract and Chris Pennell as the new captain.

=== Return to the Premiership ===
The 2010–11 season saw Worcester win 30 out of 31 games in the Championship, losing the only game to the Cornish Pirates in the main season at Sixways. Worcester were top of the league and top of their stage 2 group. After winning the play-off against Bedford Blues at Sixways and both legs of the play-off final, Worcester secured promotion to the Premiership for the 2011–12 season. Before the season began, there were local news reports that Worcester Warriors aimed to build a Hilton Hotel on the Sixways site, whilst also building a health and leisure facility and potentially expanding the North Stand. Hill left the Warriors in April 2013 and was replaced by Dean Ryan.

=== 2013 onwards ===
Ryan couldn't keep the Warriors in the league in his first season in charge and the club was once again relegated to England's second tier. However, after releasing a number of older players the club began a rebuilding phase led by Ryan who recruited young talents unable to get game-time at big clubs. Warriors achieved promotion back to the Premiership at their first attempt, beating Bristol in the playoffs thanks to a last minute Chris Pennell try and Ryan Lamb conversion. The club also managed to win the B&I Cup defeating Doncaster 35–5. Warriors' first season back in the Aviva Premiership during the 2015/16 campaign was a successful one following the redevelopment of the Indoor Training Centre. The club also made a number of high-profile signings in Francois Hougaard, Donncha O'Callaghan and Wynand Olivier and finished the season in tenth position after winning seven games. In 2016–17 the club finished 11th after a strong finish to the season under new Director of Rugby Gary Gold. Warriors scored a club record of 56 tries in the league. Gold left Worcester in early 2018 and was replaced as director of rugby by Alan Solomons who guided Worcester to another 11th-place finish in 2017–18.

The 2021–22 season saw the club finish 11th in the Premiership and win the Premiership Cup for the first time.

=== 2022–2024: financial difficulties, administration and suspension from Premiership ===
In August 2022 the club was served with a winding-up petition for unpaid tax by HM Revenue and Customs. They played their first game of the season, suffering heavy defeat to London Irish on 10 September 2022.

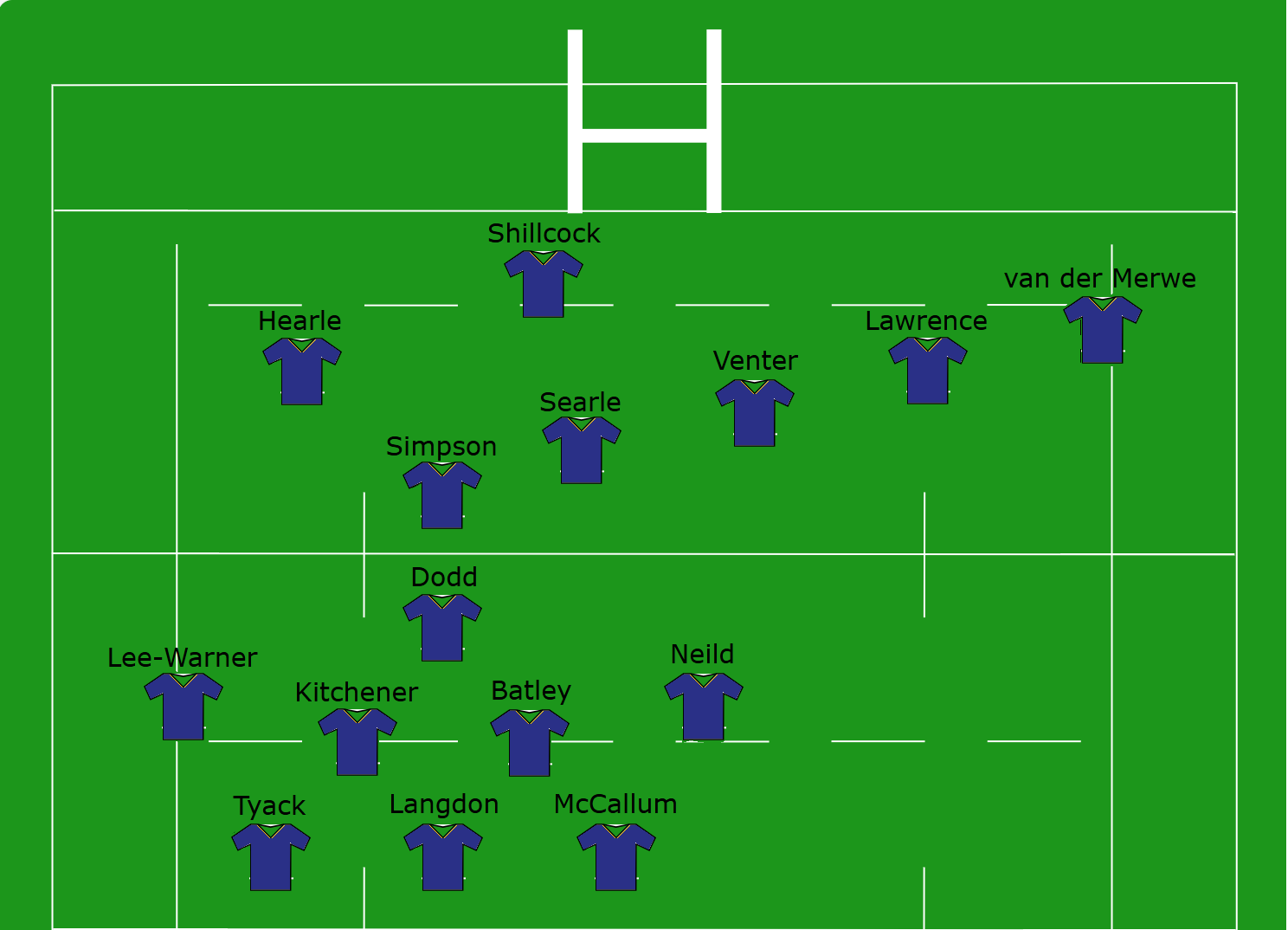
The final starting line-up before administration

A statement was released on 13 September confirming that the club were awaiting final contract sign off by a new buyer. Despite the deadline of the following day; the deal was not signed and the RFU issued an ultimatum to the club on 15 September. They had until 12:00 BST on 16 September to confirm compliance for their round two match at Sixways or they would be suspended from the league. Compliance was confirmed by midday and therefore their round 2 match took place on 18 September 2022. The club received a similar ultimatum for their round 3 match on 24 September. They were able to prove compliance for the match by midday on 22 September and were then asked to prove long-term viability by 5pm on 26 September. This deadline was missed and Worcester Warriors along with their women's team were suspended from all competitions. It was later confirmed by the club that they were seeking administration.

The club were expelled from Premiership Rugby for the season on 6 October and their results were expunged from the table. Subject to finding a buyer they will play in the RFU Championship in 2023–24.

On 16 December 2022, the RFU rejected the club's plans for a return to the Championship in 2023–24 due to the prospective buyers selected by the administrators being unable to fulfill given conditions. Unless an alternative buyer is found the prospective buyers will not be able to operate the club as a professional club.

=== 2024 – present: return to rugby ===
In the autumn of 2024, a revival of the former club submitted an application to join the second tier of English rugby. Evaluations and interviews took place throughout November 2024 and if successful they will return for the 2025–26 season when the second tier is expanded from 12 to 14 teams.

In April 2025, it was announced that Worcester would play in the new tier 2 league for the 2025–26 season. The new league would consist of 14 teams, including all 12 existing Championship clubs, the promoted National League 1 club (subject to meeting the league's Minimum Operating Standards), and the new Worcester Warriors.

In May 2025, Matt Everard was appointed as Head Coach.

Worcester had their first Championship league game on 4 October 2025 against Coventry R.F.C. which resulted in a home victory 29-19 for Worcester. Their first away game however resulted in a 28–25 loss over Hartpury University R.F.C., a team who ended up doing the double over Worcester with a 34–28 win at Sixways in January

=== Rivalries ===
Toward the end of their time, Worcester developed two main rivalries, with Gloucester and Rotherham.

The rivalry with Rotherham stemmed from the clubs meeting each other numerous times in The Championship between 1998 and 2003. After Worcester gained promotion to the Championship in 1998, the two clubs were constantly at the top end of the table together, battling for the solitary promotion place. In the four seasons they were both in the league, between 1998 and 2003, Rotherham finished second once and first three times, whilst Worcester finished third twice and second twice. Due to both teams consistently doing well in the league, and tensions between the two clubs being high off the pitch, the games often attracted bigger crowds and greater media interest than usual. The importance of the clashes and the rivalry that developed led to the two clubs being dubbed "The Celtic and Rangers" of their division.

After two close league games in the 2001–02 season, which saw Worcester win at Sixways in September by two points, thanks to a Tim Walsh drop goal, and Rotherham win the game at Clifton Lane in January by 10 points, the rivalry peaked in the following season, 2002–03. Rotherham had won the 2001–02 Championship, losing just two games, with Worcester finishing second, having lost three games. However, Rotherham were denied promotion based on the fact that their stadium, Clifton Lane, was not at the required standard. To rectify that and meet Premiership stadium criteria in time for the 2002–03 season, Rotherham moved to Millmoor and shared the stadium with Rotherham United FC.

The first meeting between the two teams in the 2002–03 campaign was at Millmoor on 23 November. Despite being fairly early in the season, a big five-point win for Rotherham, in front of over 4,000 fans, including a sizeable away following from Worcester, was a huge step in Rotherham winning the league and gaining promotion. That encounter was again a very heated and physical battle. Worcester were well on top during the first half and went into the interval 13–6 ahead, thanks to a Chris Garrard try and some excellent game management from fly half Tim Walsh. However, the second half was a completely different affair, with Worcester's Chris Garrard sent off for a dangerous tackle on Jacob Raulini, and Steve Caine sin binned. Rotherham, spurred on by their biggest and most vociferous crowd of the season, scored 32 points, including four tries, and conceded none, to complete a demolition of Worcester.

Despite the big win for Rotherham at Millmoor, Worcester only lost one game until the two teams met again at Sixways in April, winning 12 league games and losing only away to Orrell. That ensured they kept in contact with Rotherham at the top of the table. The game at Sixways was the third-last game of the season and, with the sides neck and neck in the league, the winner would almost certainly gain a place in the Premiership. Worcester had gone 20 games and 18 months since their last home loss, which was to Rotherham in September 2001. The game was the first Championship match to be broadcast live on Sky Sports and it also saw the record attendance for a Championship game, with temporary stands constructed to ensure that 5,700 fans could watch. Rotherham brought a 1,000-strong contingent, almost all of whom were seated in the North Stand at Sixways, in what was virtual segregation. The first half of the game was extremely tense, with Rotherham leading 9–3 at the break. However, the second half saw Rotherham score two tries in 10 minutes which put the game out of Worcester's reach. Rotherham went on to win the game 21–9, which sparked wild celebrations and a pitch invasion from the Rotherham fans.

Rotherham were often considered as Worcester's rivals by fans who watched Worcester before 2004. However, because Worcester's average attendances more than doubled after that, a large percentage of the Worcester fan base, many of them newer supporters, saw Gloucester as Worcester's main rival. That was predominantly because of playing them regularly since gaining promotion to the Premiership in 2004, the geographical closeness of the two cities, and various media sources citing the game as a derby.

== Current coaches ==
- Head Coach – Matt Everard
- Assistant Coach – Tom Cruse

== Current squad ==
The Worcester Warriors squad for the upcoming 2026-27 season is:

Worcester Warriors 2026–27 Championship Rugby squad
**Props**: (England) Fraser Balmain; (England) Ashley Challenger; (England) Finn Haynes; (Wales) Joe Jones; (England) Billy Keast; (England) Cameron Miell; (Fiji) **Livai Natave**; **Hookers**: (England) Will Biggs; (England) Jack Dickinson; (England) Archie Vanes; (England) Austin Wallis; **Locks**: (England) Hallam Chapman; (Wales) Owain Evans; (France) Côme Joussain; (Scotland) Monty Oliver; (England) Tom Savage	**Back row**: (Australia) Tim Anstee; (England) James Cherry; (England) Kofi Cripps; (England) John Hawkins; (England) **Matt Kvesic**; (Scotland) James Tyas; (Wales) George Young; **Scrum-halves**: (Scotland) Charlie Chapman; (Scotland) Noah Cowan; (England) Jake Garside; (England) Will Lane; (Wales) **Lloyd Williams**; **Fly-halves**: (England) Tiff Eden; (Scotland) Lochie Glackin; (Wales) Will Reed; (England) Rory Taylor	**Centres**: (England) Zach Armstrong; (England) Alfie Garside; (England) Jack Hopson; (England) Tom Seabrook; (England) James Short; (England) **Billy Twelvetrees**; **Wings**: (England) Josh Bassett; (Uruguay) **Juan Gonzalez**; (Fiji) Siva Naulago; (England) Roma Zheng; **Fullbacks**: (England) Louis Brown; (England) Will Trewin
**(c)** denotes the team captain. **Bold** denotes internationally capped players. Source:

== Season summaries ==
	League				Domestic Cup		European Cup	
Season	Competition	Final position	Points	Play-offs	Competition	Performance	Competition	Performance
1987–88	Midlands 2 West	8th	8	N/A	John Player Cup	Did not play	No competition	N/A
1988–89	Midlands 2 West	11th (R)	3	N/A	Pilkington Cup	Did not play	No competition	N/A
1989–90	North Midlands 1	1st (P)	16	N/A	Pilkington Cup	Did not play	No competition	N/A
1990–91	Midlands 2 West	5th	10	N/A	Pilkington Cup	Did not play	No competition	N/A
1991–92	Midlands 2 West	3rd	14	N/A	Pilkington Cup	Did not play	No competition	N/A
1992–93	Midlands 2 (Note: Restructuring ahead of the 1992–93 season saw Midlands 2 East and Midlands 2 West combined into a single division called Midlands 2.)	2nd (P)	18	N/A	Pilkington Cup	2nd round	No competition	N/A
1993–94	Midlands 1	2nd	16	N/A	Pilkington Cup	Did not play	No competition	N/A
1994–95	Midlands 1	1st (P)	23	N/A	Pilkington Cup	Did not play	No competition	N/A
1995–96	Courage Division 5 North	2nd (P)	18	N/A	Pilkington Cup	4th round	No English teams	N/A
1996–97	Courage Division 4 North	1st (P)	49	N/A	Pilkington Cup	2nd round	Not qualified	N/A
1997–98	National League 1	1st (P)	48	N/A	Tetley's Bitter Cup	5th round	Not qualified	N/A
1998–99	Allied Dunbar Premiership 2	3rd	34	N/A	Tetley's Bitter Cup	4th round	No English teams	N/A
1998–99	Allied Dunbar Premiership 2	3rd	34	N/A	C&G Cup	1st round	No English teams	N/A
1999–00	Allied Dunbar Premiership 2	3rd	38	N/A	Tetley's Bitter Cup	4th round	Not qualified	N/A
2000–01	National Division 1	2nd	112	N/A	Tetley's Bitter Cup	5th round	Not qualified	N/A
2001–02	National Division 1	2nd	106	N/A	Powergen Cup	5th round	Not qualified	N/A
2002–03	National Division 1	2nd	114	N/A	Powergen Cup	6th round	Not qualified	N/A
2002–03	National Division 1	2nd	114	N/A	Powergen Shield	Semi-final	Not qualified	N/A
2003–04	National Division 1	1st (P)	125	N/A	Powergen Cup	5th round	Not qualified	N/A
2004–05	Zurich Premiership	9th	42	–	Powergen Cup	6th round	European Shield	Runners-up
2005–06	Guinness Premiership	8th	47	–	Powergen Cup	4th in pool	Challenge Cup	Semi-final
2006–07	Guinness Premiership	11th	34	–	EDF Energy Cup	2nd in pool	Challenge Cup	2nd in pool
2007–08	Guinness Premiership	10th	36	–	EDF Energy Cup	4th in pool	Challenge Cup	Runners-up
2008–09	Guinness Premiership	11th	34	–	EDF Energy Cup	4th in pool	Challenge Cup	Semi-final
2009–10	Guinness Premiership	12th (R)	28	–	LV= Cup	4th in pool	Challenge Cup	3rd in pool
2010–11	RFU Championship	1st (P)	101	Champions	British and Irish Cup	Semi-final	Not qualified	N/A
2011–12	Aviva Premiership	10th	36	–	LV= Cup	3rd in pool	Challenge Cup	2nd in pool
2012–13	Aviva Premiership	11th	33	–	LV= Cup	4th in pool	Challenge Cup	2nd in pool
2013–14	Aviva Premiership	12th (R)	16	–	LV= Cup	4th in pool	Challenge Cup	4th in pool
2014–15	RFU Championship	2nd (P)	97	Champions	British and Irish Cup	Champions	Not qualified	N/A
2015–16	Aviva Premiership	10th	35	–	No competition	N/A	Challenge Cup	4th in pool
2016–17	Aviva Premiership	11th	33	–	Anglo-Welsh Cup	4th in pool	Challenge Cup	3rd in pool
2017–18	Aviva Premiership	11th	36	–	Anglo-Welsh Cup	2nd in pool	Challenge Cup	3rd in pool
2018–19	Gallagher Premiership	10th	46	–	Premiership Cup	Semi-final	Challenge Cup	Quarter-final
2019–20	Gallagher Premiership	9th	42	–	Premiership Cup	4th in pool	Challenge Cup	3rd in pool
2020–21	Gallagher Premiership	12th (Note: Despite finishing bottom of the table Warriors were reprieved of relegation due to a moratorium.)	27	–	No Competition	–	Challenge Cup	11th in pool
2021–22	Gallagher Premiership	11th	35	–	Premiership Cup	Champions	Challenge Cup	Round of 16
2025–26	Champ Rugby	4th	87	Champions	Not qualified	N/A	Not qualified	N/A

Gold background denotes champions.
Silver background denotes runners-up.
Pink background denotes relegated.

* After dropping into the competition from the Challenge Cup

== Club honours ==
=== Worcester Warriors ===
- Premiership Rugby Cup
  - Champions: (1) 2021–22
- RFU Championship
  - Champions: (4) 2003–04, 2010–11, 2014–15, 2025–26
  - Runners-up: (3) 2000–01, 2001–02, 2002–03
- National League 1
  - Champions: (1) 1997–98
- National League 2 North
  - Champions: (1) 1996–97
- Midlands Premier
  - Champions: (1) 1994–95
- Midlands 2 West
  - Champions: (1) 1992–93
- North Midlands 1
  - Champions: (1) 1989–90
- European Challenge Cup
  - Runners-up: (1) 2007–08
- European Shield
  - Runners-up: (1) 2004–05
- British and Irish Cup
  - Champions: (1) 2014–15
- North Midlands Cup
  - Champions: (3) 1977–78, 1995–96, 1997–98
  - Runners-up: (3) 1976–77, 1993–94, 1996–97
- Powerline Floodlit Cup
  - Champions: (1) 1997–98

=== Worcester Cavaliers ===
- Premiership Rugby Shield
  - Runners-up: (1) 2014–15

== Current standings ==
2026–27 Champ Rugby table
Pos	Team	Pld	W	D	L	PF	PA	PD	TF	TA	TB	LB	Pts	Qualification
1	Worcester Warriors	5	5	0	0	246	95	+151	37	14	4	0	24	Play-off semi-finals
2	Ealing Trailfinders	5	4	0	1	242	109	+133	38	16	4	1	21	Play-off semi-finals
3	Coventry	5	4	0	1	243	171	+72	36	26	2	1	19	Play-off quarter-finals
4	Rotherham Titans	5	4	0	1	160	191	−31	25	29	1	0	17	Play-off quarter-finals
5	Ampthill	5	4	0	1	195	195	0	29	29	0	0	16	Play-off quarter-finals
6	Cornish Pirates	5	3	0	2	182	187	−5	27	28	2	0	14	Play-off quarter-finals
7	Chinnor	5	3	0	2	180	183	−3	22	21	1	0	13	
8	Doncaster Knights	5	2	0	3	161	152	+9	24	21	1	2	11	
9	Bedford Blues	5	2	0	3	143	158	−15	22	24	2	1	11	
10	Blackheath	5	1	0	4	146	189	−43	20	27	0	3	7	
11	Caldy	5	1	0	4	176	206	−30	25	31	0	2	6	
12	Nottingham	5	1	0	4	128	206	−78	19	32	0	1	5	Relegation play-off
13	Hartpury	5	1	0	4	116	207	−91	16	31	0	1	5	Relegation play-off
14	Richmond	5	0	0	5	123	192	−69	19	29	0	1	1	Relegated

First match(es) will be played: 18 September 2026. Source:
Rules for classification: If teams are level at any stage, tiebreakers are applied in the following order:
1. Number of matches won
2. Number of matches drawn
3. Difference between points for and against
4. Total number of points for
5. Aggregate number of points scored in matches between tied teams
6. Number of matches won excluding the first match, then the second and so on until the tie is settled

== Notable players ==
=== Lions tourists ===
The following Worcester Warriors players have been selected for the Lions tours while at the club:

- Ben Te'o (2017)

=== Rugby World Cup ===
The following are players who have represented their countries at the World Cup, whilst playing for Worcester:

Tournament	Number of players	Players selected
1999	1	Sililo Martens (Tonga)
2003	2	Ben Hinshelwood (Scotland) , Sateki Tuipulotu (Tonga)
2007	4	Chris Horsman (Wales) , Aisea Havili, Aleki Lutui (Tonga) , Loki Crichton (Samoa)
2011	2	Aleki Lutui (Tonga) , Ravai Fatiaki (Fiji)
2015	1	Tevita Cavubati (Fiji)
2019	2	Ed Fidow (Samoa) , Joe Taufete'e (United States)

== Sponsors ==
The club's kit is made by sports manufacturer O'Neills, who they signed with in 2020 to produce home and away strips for Premiership Rugby. Their main shirt sponsor is Adam Hewitt Ltd. In 2019, the club signed a multi-year deal with Aramis Rugby to supply digital scrum machines.

== Charitable causes ==
Acorns Children's Hospice has been the official charity partner of Warriors since the facility opened in March 2005. The club have raised in excess of £200,000 to assist the charity since its inception and this season hooker Niall Annett is the charity's Player Ambassador.

Cecil Duckworth is a trustee of the Wooden Spoon, the charity of British rugby, supporting disadvantaged children. In January 2007, Worcester opened a "Playing for Success" centre, supported by Spoon.
