= 1987–88 National Division 3 =

Rugby union competition in England

- Countries: England
- Date: September 1987 – April 1988
- Champions: Wakefield (1st title)
- Runners-up: West Hartlepool
- Relegated: Morley; Birmingham
- Matches played: 66
- Top point scorer: 121 – Steve Burnage (Fylde)
- Top try scorer: 10 – Brendan Hanavan (Fylde)

The 1987–88 National Division 3 was the first season of the third tier tier of the English rugby union league system, the Courage Clubs Championship, and the first to be sponsored by Courage Brewery. It was also the first season of a truly national rugby union league, with the third tier currently known as National League 1.

Both Wakefield and West Hartlepool won ten matches, lost one and finished on twenty points. Wakefield finished as champions due to their superior points difference but neither team was promoted to the 1988–89 National Division 2. Morley and Birmingham (without a win) finished in the bottom two places and both clubs were relegated to the 1988–89 Area League North. Almost all clubs in the national divisions reported an increase in attendances.

== Structure ==
Each team played one match against the other teams, playing a total of eleven matches each. There was no set date for matches, clubs having to arrange the fixtures amongst themselves. For this first season there was no promotion to National Division 2 but the bottom two sides would be relegated to either Area League 2 North or Area League South depending on locality.

== Participating teams and locations ==
1987–88 National Division 3 teams in England

Team	Stadium	Capacity	City/Area
Birmingham	Sharmans Cross	4,000	Solihull, West Midlands
Exeter	County Ground	5,750 (750 seats)	Exeter, Devon
Fylde	Woodlands	7,500 (500 seats)	Lytham St Annes, Lancashire
Maidstone	William Davey Memorial	2,000 (100 seats)	Maidstone, Kent
Metropolitan Police	Imber Court	3,500 (500 seats)	East Molesey, Surrey
Morley	Scatcherd Lane	6,000 (1,000 seats)	Morley, Leeds
Nuneaton	Harry Cleaver Ground	5,000 (650 seats)	Nuneaton, Warwickshire
Plymouth Albion	Beacon Park	1,950 (450 seats)	Plymouth, Devon
Sheffield	Abbeydale Park	3,300 (100 seats) (Note: Although a 1990 club estimate was 1,100 (100 seated and 1,000 standing) this is very conservative as Abbeydale Park would experience 3,000+ crowds several times in later history in what was a relatively unchanged ground.)	Dore, Sheffield, South Yorkshire
Vale of Lune	Powderhouse Lane	9,860 (360 seats)	Lancaster, Lancashire
Wakefield	College Grove	4,000 (500 seats)	Wakefield, West Yorkshire
West Hartlepool	Brierton Lane	4,950 (450 seats)	Hartlepool, Cleveland

== League table ==
1987–88 National Division 3 table
Pos	Team	Pld	W	D	L	PF	PA	PD	Pts
1	Wakefield (C)	11	10	0	1	308	90	+218	20
2	West Hartlepool	11	10	0	1	249	105	+144	20
3	Plymouth Albion	11	8	0	3	276	125	+151	16
4	Sheffield	11	7	1	3	134	161	−27	15
5	Vale of Lune	11	7	0	4	183	149	+34	14
6	Fylde	11	6	0	5	269	170	+99	12
7	Metropolitan Police	11	5	0	6	130	128	+2	10
8	Maidstone	11	4	0	7	134	162	−28	8
9	Exeter	11	3	2	6	128	197	−69	8
10	Nuneaton	11	2	1	8	94	157	−63	5
11	Morley	11	1	1	9	109	235	−126	3
12	Birmingham	11	0	1	10	46	381	−335	1

Rules for classification: Points were awarded as follows:
1. 2 pts for a win
2. 1 pt for a draw
3. 0 pts for a loss

If teams were level at any stage, tiebreakers were applied in the following order:

1. Difference between points for and against
Some publications listed league tables with 4 pts for a win, 2 pt for a draw and 1 pt for a loss. (This scoring system is not the same as the current bonus points system introduced in 2000–01.) There was no promotion this season.
(C) Champions

== See also ==
- 1987–88 National Division 1
- 1987–88 National Division 2
- 1987–88 Area League North
- 1987–88 Area League South
