= 1989–90 National Division 2 =

Rugby union competition in England

- Countries: England
- Date: 9 September 1989 – 28 April 1990
- Champions: Northampton (1st title)
- Runners-up: Liverpool St Helens
- Relegated: None
- Matches played: 66
- Top point scorer: 107 – Ian Aitchison (London Irish)
- Top try scorer: 7 – Jim Fallon (Richmond)

The 1989–90 National Division 2 (sponsored by Courage Brewery) was the third season of the second tier of the English rugby union league system, the Courage Clubs Championship, currently known as Champ Rugby. New sides included Waterloo (relegated from the top flight) and Rugby Lions and Plymouth Albion (promoted from tier 3).

Northampton, the champions, were promoted to the 1990–91 National Division 1 along with the runners–up Liverpool St Helens. It was the second time in three seasons that Liverpool St Helens won promotion from the second tier. Due to the expansion of the national divisions there was no relegation to the 1990–91 National Division 3.

== Structure ==
Each team played one match against each of the other teams, playing a total of eleven matches each. The top two clubs were promoted to National Division 1 and there would be no relegation due to the expansion of the division from twelve to thirteen teams for the following season.

== Participating teams ==
Locations of the 1989–90 National Division 2 teams

Team	Stadium	Capacity	City/Area	Previous season
Blackheath	Rectory Field	3,500 (500 seats)	Greenwich, London	8th
Coventry	Coundon Road	10,000 (1,100 seats)	Coventry, West Midlands	5th
Gosforth	Prenton Avenue (Note: Gosforth were previously based North Road but sold the site of their ground for development in 1989. Before they could move into their new ground at Kingston Park they would spend the 1989–90 season ground sharing at the Prenton Avenue, the home ground of Percy Park RFC.)		Newcastle upon Tyne, Tyne and Wear	10th
Headingley	Clarence Fields	7,850 (850 seats)	Leeds, West Yorkshire	7th
Liverpool St Helens	Moss Lane	4,370 (370 seats)	St Helens, Merseyside	Relegated from National 1 (12th)
London Irish	The Avenue	3,600 (600 seats)	Sunbury-on-Thames, Surrey	6th
Northampton	Franklin's Gardens	6,000 (2,000 seats)	Northampton, Northamptonshire	3rd
Plymouth Albion	Beacon Park	1,950 (450 seats)	Plymouth, Devon	Promoted from National 3 (1st)
Richmond	Athletic Ground	7,300 (1,300 seats)	Richmond, London	9th
Rugby	Webb Ellis Road	3,200 (200 seats)	Rugby, Warwickshire	Promoted from National 3 (2nd)
Sale	Heywood Road	4,000 (500 seats)	Sale, Greater Manchester	4th
Waterloo	St Anthony's Road	9,950 (950 seats)	Blundellsands, Merseyside	Relegated from National 1 (11th)

== Table ==
1989–90 National Division 2 table
Pos	Team	Pld	W	D	L	PF	PA	PD	Pts	Qualification
1	Northampton (C)	11	9	1	1	192	135	+57	19	Promoted
2	Liverpool St Helens	11	8	2	1	154	106	+48	18	Promoted
3	Richmond	11	7	1	3	282	135	+147	15	
4	Coventry	11	6	1	4	206	185	+21	13	
5	London Irish	11	6	0	5	228	247	−19	12	
6	Rugby	11	5	0	6	238	172	+66	10	
7	Plymouth Albion	11	5	0	6	206	164	+42	10	
8	Headingley	11	5	0	6	161	226	−65	10	
9	Sale	11	4	0	7	153	182	−29	8	
10	Blackheath	11	3	2	6	141	205	−64	8	
11	Waterloo	11	3	0	8	147	193	−46	6	
12	Gosforth	11	1	1	9	108	266	−158	3	

Rules for classification: Points are awarded as follows:
1. 2 pts for a win
2. 1 pt for a draw
3. 0 pts for a loss
(There was no relegation this season)
(C) Champions

== Fixtures & Results ==
=== Round 1 ===
9 September 1989

Blackheath	0 – 21	Rugby

Rectory Field

9 September 1989

Coventry	18 – 25	London Irish

Coundon Road

9 September 1989

Liverpool St Helens	16 – 11	Gosforth

Moss Lane

9 September 1989

Northampton	6 – 4	Plymouth Albion

Franklin's Gardens

9 September 1989

Richmond	16 – 7	Sale

Athletic Ground

9 September 1989

Waterloo	9 – 6	Headingley

St Anthony's Road

=== Round 2 ===
23 September 1989

Gosforth	12 – 12	Blackheath

Prenton Avenue

23 September 1989

Headingley	15 – 3	Northampton

Clarence Fields

23 September 1989

London Irish	24 – 23	Waterloo

The Avenue

23 September 1989

Plymouth Albion	20 – 3	Liverpool St Helens

Beacon Park

23 September 1989

Rugby	16 – 28	Richmond

Webb Ellis Road

23 September 1989

Sale	24 – 22	Coventry

Heywood Road

=== Round 3 ===
14 October 1989

Blackheath	9 – 37	Plymouth Albion

Rectory Field

14 October 1989

Coventry	18 – 10	Rugby

Coundon Road

14 October 1989

Liverpool St Helens	10 – 4	Headingley

Moss Lane

14 October 1989

Northampton	33 – 21	London Irish

Franklin's Gardens

14 October 1989

Richmond	36 – 3	Gosforth

Athletic Ground

14 October 1989

Waterloo	12 – 9	Sale

St Anthony's Road

=== Round 4 ===
28 October 1989

Gosforth	0 – 16	Coventry

Prenton Avenue

28 October 1989

Headingley	31 – 12	Blackheath

Clarence Fields

28 October 1989

London Irish	12 – 23	Liverpool St Helens

The Avenue

28 October 1989

Plymouth Albion	11 – 12	Richmond

Beacon Park

28 October 1989

Rugby	28 – 6	Waterloo

Webb Ellis Road

28 October 1989

Sale	3 – 16	Northampton

Heywood Road

=== Round 5 ===
11 November 1989

Coventry	13 – 13	Liverpool St Helens

Coundon Road

11 November 1989

London Irish	25 – 19	Headingley

The Avenue

11 November 1989

Rugby	49 – 9	Gosforth

Webb Ellis Road

11 November 1989

Sale	15 – 11	Plymouth Albion

Heywood Road

11 November 1989

Waterloo	6 – 12	Northampton

St Anthony's Road

12 November 1989

Richmond	15 – 15	Blackheath

Athletic Ground

=== Round 6 ===
18 November 1989

Blackheath	16 – 21	Coventry

Rectory Field

18 November 1989

Gosforth	6 – 27	London Irish

Prenton Avenue

18 November 1989

Headingley	3 – 9	Sale

Clarence Fields

18 November 1989

Liverpool St Helens	10 – 3	Waterloo

Moss Lane

18 November 1989

Northampton	12 – 6	Richmond

Franklin's Gardens

18 November 1989

Plymouth Albion	21 – 16	Rugby

Beacon Park

=== Round 7 ===
25 November 1989

Coventry	21 – 18	Richmond

Coundon Road

25 November 1989

Liverpool St Helens	13 – 13	Northampton

Moss Lane

25 November 1989

Plymouth Albion	28 – 13	Gosforth

Beacon Park

25 November 1989

Rugby	31 – 8	Headingley

Webb Ellis Road

25 November 1989

Sale - London Irish	19 – 27	London Irish

Heywood Road

25 November 1989

Waterloo	10 – 19	Blackheath

St Anthony's Road

=== Round 8 ===
13 January 1990

Blackheath	9 – 10	Northampton

Rectory Field

13 January 1990

Coventry	22 – 12	Waterloo

Coundon Road

13 January 1990

Headingley	17 – 10	Gosforth

Clarence Fields

13 January 1990

London Irish	27 – 19	Plymouth Albion

The Avenue

13 January 1990

Richmond	6 – 17	Liverpool St Helens

Athletic Ground

13 January 1990

Sale	20 – 13	Rugby

Heywood Road

=== Round 9 ===
9 March 1990

Gosforth	22 – 18	Sale

Prenton Avenue

9 March 1990

Liverpool St Helens	16 – 3	Blackheath

Moss Lane

9 March 1990

Northampton	24 – 18	Coventry

Franklin's Gardens

9 March 1990

Plymouth Albion	9 – 20	Headingley

Beacon Park

9 March 1990

Rugby	23 – 10	London Irish

Webb Ellis Road

9 March 1990

Waterloo	13 – 23	Richmond

St Anthony's Road

=== Round 10 ===
31 March 1990

Gosforth	15 – 22	Northampton

Prenton Avenue

31 March 1990

Headingley	30 – 22	Coventry

Clarence Fields

31 March 1990

London Irish	12 – 36	Richmond

The Avenue

31 March 1990

Plymouth Albion	33 – 28	Waterloo

Beacon Park

31 March 1990

Rugby	6 – 11	Liverpool St Helens

Webb Ellis Road

31 March 1990

Sale	14 – 18	Blackheath

Heywood Road

=== Round 11 ===
28 April 1990

Blackheath	28 – 18	London Irish

Rectory Field

28 April 1990

Coventry	15 – 13	Plymouth Albion

Coundon Road

28 April 1990

Liverpool St Helens	22 – 15	Sale

Moss Lane

28 April 1990

Northampton	41 – 25	Rugby

Franklin's Gardens

28 April 1990

Richmond	86 – 8	Headingley

Athletic Ground

28 April 1990

Waterloo	25 – 7	Gosforth

St Anthony's Road

== See also ==
- 1989–90 National Division 1
- 1989–90 National Division 3
- 1989–90 Area League North
- 1989–90 Area League South
