= 1988–89 National Division 3 =

Rugby union competition in England

- Countries: England
- Date: September 1988 – April 1989
- Champions: Plymouth (1st title)
- Runners-up: Rugby (also promoted)
- Relegated: Metropolitan Police; Maidstone
- Matches played: 66
- Top point scorer: 123 – Chris Howard (Rugby)
- Top try scorer: 8 – Dave Scully (Wakefield); Steve Walklin (Plymouth)

The 1988–89 National Division 3 (sponsored by Courage Brewery) was the second season of the third tier of the English rugby union league system, the Courage Clubs Championship, currently known as National League 1. New clubs to the division included Askeans and Rugby who were promoted from tier 4 and there was no relegation from tier 2 at the end of the previous season.

Plymouth Albion won all their eleven matches and won promotion to the 1989–90 National Division 2. Rugby Lions finished second, winning ten of their eleven matches, and were also promoted. Metropolitan Police and Maidstone finished in the bottom two places and both clubs were relegated to the 1989–90 Area League South with Metropolitan Police relegated on points difference and Maidstone losing all of their matches.

== Structure ==
Each team played one match against each of the other teams, playing a total of eleven matches each, and for the first time matches were played on fixed Saturdays. The top two clubs were promoted to National Division 2 and the bottom two relegated to Area League North or Area League South depending on locality.

== Participating teams and locations ==
1988–89 National Division 3 teams in England

Team	Stadium	Capacity	City/Area	Previous season
Askeans	Broad Walk	1,500 (300 seats)	Kidbrooke, London	Promoted from Area South (1st)
Exeter	County Ground	5,750 (750 seats)	Exeter, Devon	9th
Fylde	Woodlands	7,500 (500 seats)	Lytham St Annes, Lancashire	6th
Maidstone	William Davey Memorial	2,000 (100 seats)	Maidstone, Kent	8th
Metropolitan Police	Imber Court	3,500 (500 seats)	East Molesey, Surrey	7th
Nuneaton	Harry Cleaver Ground	5,000 (650 seats)	Nuneaton, Warwickshire	10th
Plymouth Albion	Beacon Park	1,950 (450 seats)	Plymouth, Devon	3rd
Rugby	Webb Ellis Road	3,200 (200 seats)	Rugby, Warwickshire	Promoted from Area North (1st)
Sheffield	Abbeydale Park	3,300 (100 seats) (Note: Although a 1990 club estimate was 1,100 (100 seated and 1,000 standing) this is very conservative as Abbeydale Park would experience 3,000+ crowds several times in later history in what was a relatively unchanged ground.)	Dore, Sheffield, South Yorkshire	4th
Vale of Lune	Powderhouse Lane	9,860 (360 seats)	Lancaster, Lancashire	5th
Wakefield	College Grove	4,000 (500 seats)	Wakefield, West Yorkshire	1st (no promotion)
West Hartlepool	Brierton Lane	4,950 (450 seats)	Hartlepool, Cleveland	2nd (no promotion)

== League table ==
1988–89 National Division 3 table
Pos	Team	Pld	W	D	L	PF	PA	PD	Pts	Qualification
1	Plymouth Albion (C)	11	11	0	0	311	89	+222	22	Promoted
2	Rugby	11	10	0	1	268	99	+169	20	Promoted
3	Wakefield	11	9	0	2	282	114	+168	18	
4	West Hartlepool	11	5	1	5	164	133	+31	11	
5	Nuneaton	11	5	0	6	178	214	−36	10	
6	Sheffield	11	4	1	6	170	182	−12	9	
7	Vale of Lune	11	4	1	6	120	145	−25	9	
8	Askeans	11	4	1	6	141	215	−74	9	
9	Exeter	11	4	0	7	142	180	−38	8	
10	Fylde	11	4	0	7	136	181	−45	8	
11	Metropolitan Police	11	4	0	7	130	275	−145	8	Relegated
12	Maidstone	11	0	0	11	74	289	−215	0	Relegated

Rules for classification: Points are awarded as follows:
1. 2 pts for a win
2. 1 pt for a draw
3. 0 pts for a loss

If teams are level at any stage, tiebreakers are applied in the following order:

1. Difference between points for and against
  (C) Champions

== See also ==
- 1988–89 National Division 1
- 1988–89 National Division 2
- 1988–89 Area League North
- 1988–89 Area League South
