= 1988–89 Area League North =

Rugby union competition in England

- Countries: England
- Champions: Roundhay (1st title)
- Runners-up: Broughton Park (not promoted)
- Relegated: Birmingham
- Matches played: 110

The 1988–89 Area League North was the second full season of rugby union within the fourth tier of the English league system, currently known as National League 2 North, and was the counterpart to Area League South (later National League 2 South). By the end of the season Roundhay were crowned league champions, just 1 point ahead of runners up Broughton Park, gaining promotion to the 1989–90 National Division 3.

At the other end of the table Birmingham were easily the weakest team, failing to register a single point as they suffered a second successive relegation, dropping to Midlands 1. It would be Birmingham's final season as a single entity as they would merge with Solihull (themselves relegated the previous campaign) to form Birmingham & Solihull RFC for the 1989–90 season.

== Structure ==
Each team played one match against each of the other teams, playing a total of ten matches each. The champions are promoted to National Division 3 and the bottom team was relegated to either North 1 or Midlands 1 depending on their locality.

== Participating teams and locations ==
Locations of the 1988–89 Area League North teams

Team	Ground	Capacity	City/Area	Previous Season
Birmingham	Sharmans Cross	4,000	Solihull, West Midlands	Relegated from National 3 (12th)
Broughton Park	Chelsfield Grove	2,000 (400 seats)	Chorlton-cum-Hardy, Manchester	6th
Durham City	Hollow Drift	3,000 (500 seats)	Durham, County Durham	2nd (not promoted)
Lichfield	Cooke Fields	5,460 (460 seats)	Lichfield, Staffordshire	8th
Morley	Scatcherd Lane	6,000 (1,000 seats)	Morley, West Yorkshire	Relegated from National 3 (11th)
Northern	McCracken Park	1,200 (200 seats)	Newcastle upon Tyne, Tyne and Wear	5th
Preston Grasshoppers	Lightfoot Green	2,250 (250 seats)	Preston, Lancashire	4th
Roundhay	Chandos Park	3,000	Roundhay, Leeds, West Yorkshire	3rd
Stoke-on-Trent	Hartwell Lane	2,000	Barlaston, Staffordshire	Promoted from Midlands 1 (1st)
Stourbridge	Stourton Park	2,000	Stourbridge, West Midlands	7th
Winnington Park	Burrows Hill	5,000	Norwich, Cheshire	Promoted from North 1 (1st)

== League table ==
1988–89 Area League North table
Pos	Team	Pld	W	D	L	PF	PA	PD	Pts	Qualification
1	Roundhay (C)	10	8	1	1	235	81	+154	17	Promoted
2	Broughton Park	10	8	0	2	179	92	+87	16	
3	Stourbridge	10	6	0	4	118	79	+39	12	
4	Northern	10	5	0	5	182	131	+51	10	
5	Winnington Park	10	5	0	5	188	155	+33	10	
6	Preston Grasshoppers	10	5	0	5	161	141	+20	10	
7	Durham City	10	5	0	5	172	157	+15	10	
8	Morley	10	5	0	5	135	141	−6	10	
9	Lichfield	10	4	1	5	112	113	−1	9	
10	Stoke-on-Trent	10	3	0	7	88	138	−50	6	
11	Birmingham (R)	10	0	0	10	29	371	−342	0	Relegated

Rules for classification: Points are awarded as follows:
1. 2 pts for a win
2. 1 pt for a draw
3. 0 pts for a loss
If teams are level at any stage, difference between points for and against applies
(C) Champions; (R) Relegated

== Sponsorship ==
Area League North is part of the Courage Clubs Championship and was sponsored by Courage Brewery.

== See also ==
- 1988–89 National Division 1
- 1988–89 National Division 2
- 1988–89 National Division 3
- 1988–89 Area League South
