= 1989–90 Area League North =

Rugby union competition in England

- Countries: England
- Champions: Broughton Park (1st title)
- Runners-up: Morley (also promoted)
- Relegated: No relegation
- Matches played: 110

The 1989–90 Area League North was the third full season of rugby union within the fourth tier of the English league system, currently known as National League 2 North, and was the counterpart to Area League South (later National League 2 South). It would be the last season the division would be called Area League North as it would be renamed National Division 4 North for the following campaign. The title battle was very strongly contested, but the end it would be Broughton Park who would triumph as league champions despite finishing dead level with runners up Morley, thanks to a far superior points/for against record. Both sides would be promoted to the 1990–91 National Division 3.

At the opposite end of the table it was a different story, with Stoke-on-Trent being the worse side in the division, failing to gain a single point as they finished last. However, Stoke were granted a reprieve as no northern clubs were relegated from the 1989–90 National Division 3 meaning they had another season in the league.

== Structure ==
Each team played one match against each of the other teams, playing a total of ten matches each. The champions are promoted to National Division 3 and the bottom team was relegated to either North 1 or Midlands 1 depending on their locality.

== Participating teams and locations ==
Locations of the 1989–90 Area League North teams

Team	Ground	Capacity	City/Area	Previous Season
Broughton Park	Chelsfield Grove	2,000 (400 seats)	Chorlton-cum-Hardy, Manchester	Runners up (not promoted)
Durham City	Hollow Drift	3,000 (500 seats)	Durham, County Durham	7th
Kendal	Mint Bridge	4,600 (600 seats)	Kendal, Cumbria	Promoted from North 1 (1st)
Lichfield	Cooke Fields	5,460 (460 seats)	Lichfield, Staffordshire	9th
Morley	Scatcherd Lane	6,000 (1,000 seats)	Morley, West Yorkshire	8th
Northern	McCracken Park	1,200 (200 seats)	Newcastle upon Tyne, Tyne and Wear	4th
Preston Grasshoppers	Lightfoot Green	2,250 (250 seats)	Preston, Lancashire	6th
Stoke-on-Trent	Hartwell Lane	2,000	Barlaston, Staffordshire	10th
Stourbridge	Stourton Park	2,000	Stourbridge, West Midlands	3rd
Walsall	Broadway	2,500 (500 seats)	Walsall, West Midlands	Promoted from Midlands 1 (1st)
Winnington Park	Burrows Hill	5,000	Norwich, Cheshire	5th

== League table ==
1989–90 Area League North table
Pos	Team	Pld	W	D	L	PF	PA	PD	Pts	Qualification
1	Broughton Park (C)	10	8	0	2	246	111	+135	16	Promoted
2	Morley (P)	10	8	0	2	169	115	+54	16	Promoted
3	Stourbridge	10	7	0	3	146	133	+13	14	
4	Durham City	10	6	0	4	195	169	+26	12	
5	Kendal	10	6	0	4	130	136	−6	12	
6	Preston Grasshoppers	10	5	0	5	122	109	+13	10	
7	Lichfield	10	5	0	5	110	121	−11	10	
8	Northern	10	4	0	6	139	144	−5	8	
9	Winnington Park	10	4	0	6	142	152	−10	8	
10	Walsall	10	2	0	8	143	183	−40	4	
11	Stoke-on-Trent	10	0	0	10	88	257	−169	0	

Rules for classification: Points are awarded as follows:
1. 2 pts for a win
2. 1 pt for a draw
3. 0 pts for a loss
4. If teams are level at any stage, difference between points for and against applies
  (C) Champions; (P) Promoted

== Sponsorship ==
Area League North is part of the Courage Clubs Championship and was sponsored by Courage Brewery.

== See also ==
- 1989–90 National Division 1
- 1989–90 National Division 2
- 1989–90 National Division 3
- 1989–90 Area League South
