= 1987–88 National Division 2 =

Rugby union competition in England

- Countries: England
- Champions: Rosslyn Park (1st title)
- Runners-up: Liverpool St Helens
- Relegated: No relegation
- Matches played: 65
- Top point scorer: 75 – Andy Finnie (Bedford)
- Top try scorer: 7 – Dave McLagan (Saracens)

The 1987–88 National Division 2 was the first season of the second tier of the English rugby union league system, the Courage Clubs Championship, and the first to be sponsored by Courage Brewery. It was also the first season of a truly national rugby union league, with the second tier currently known as Champ Rugby.

Rosslyn Park, the first ever second division champions, were promoted to the 1988–89 National Division 1 along with the runners-up, Liverpool St Helens. Although Northampton finished in last place they were not relegated to National Division 3. Almost all clubs in the national divisions reported an increase in attendances.

== Structure ==
Each team played the others once to make a total of eleven matches each and for this first season there was no fixture list; the teams arranged fixtures amongst themselves. Most teams played eleven games, although some played ten due to cancellations and there were unequal home and away fixtures. The top two sides were promoted to National Division 1 and for this season there was no relegation.

The points scheme was such that a team received four points for a win, two for a draw and one point for a loss.

== Participating teams ==
Locations of the 1987–88 National Division 2 teams
1987–88 Greater London National Division 2 teams

Team	Stadium	Capacity	City/Area
Bedford	Goldington Road	4,800 (800 seats)	Bedford, Bedfordshire
Blackheath	Rectory Field	3,500 (500 seats)	Greenwich, London
Gosforth	North Road	2,000 (400 stand)	Newcastle upon Tyne, Tyne and Wear
Headingley	Clarence Fields	7,850 (850 seats)	Leeds, West Yorkshire
Liverpool St Helens	Moss Lane	4,370 (370 seats)	St Helens, Merseyside
London Irish	The Avenue	3,600 (600 seats)	Sunbury-on-Thames, Surrey
London Scottish	Athletic Ground	7,300 (1,300 seats)	Richmond, London
London Welsh	Old Deer Park	4,500 (1,500 seats)	Richmond, London
Northampton	Franklin's Gardens	6,000 (2,000 seats)	Northampton, Northamptonshire
Richmond	Athletic Ground	7,300 (1,300 seats)	Richmond, London
Rosslyn Park	The Rock	4,630 (630 seats)	Roehampton, London
Saracens	Bramley Road	2,300 (300 seats)	Enfield, London

== League table ==
1987–88 National Division 2 table
Pos	Team	Pld	W	D	L	PF	PA	PD	Pts
1	Rosslyn Park (C)	11	8	2	1	155	83	+72	37
2	Liverpool St Helens	11	8	1	2	154	97	+57	36
3	Saracens	11	7	2	2	228	86	+142	34
4	Headingley	11	6	2	3	202	164	+38	31
5	Bedford	11	6	2	3	152	139	+13	31
6	Richmond	11	6	0	5	140	156	−16	29
7	London Scottish	11	4	1	6	141	158	−17	24
8	London Irish	11	4	1	6	120	177	−57	24
9	London Welsh	11	3	2	6	153	185	−32	22
10	Gosforth	10	2	1	7	99	129	−30	17 (Note: Gosforth had three points and one win deducted for fielding an ineligible player against Bedford)
11	Blackheath	11	2	0	9	102	187	−85	17
12	Northampton	10	1	0	9	81	226	−145	13

Rules for classification: Points are awarded as follows:
1. 4 pts for a win
2. 2 pts for a draw
3. 1 pt for a loss
- The scoring system used for this season is not the same as the current bonus points system introduced in 2000–01.
- Some publications listed league tables with the 2 pts for a win, 1 pt for a draw and 0 pts for a loss.
- There was no relegation this season.
  (C) Champions
  Notes:

== Statistics ==
=== Team ===
- Record wins

50 – 3 London Scottish v Northampton
48 – 12 Saracens at Blackheath
38 – 3 Headingley v Northampton
34 – 0 Saracens v London Scottish

- Record away win

48 – 12 Saracens at Blackheath

- Most points scored in a match

60 12 – 48 Blackheath v Saracens
58 25 – 33 Bedford v Liverpool St Helens

- Most points scored but still lost

25 28 – 25 Richmond v Bedford
25 33 – 25 Bedford v Liverpool St Helens

- Highest scoring draw

24 24 – 24 London Welsh v London Scottish

- Fewest points scored in a match

6 6 – 0 Bedford v Blackheath

=== Player ===
- Most points in a match

26 Andy Mitchell for London Scottish v Northampton

- Most points in a season

75 Andy Finnie for Bedford

- Most tries in a match

3 Jerry Macklin for London Scottish v Northampton
Orsen Blewitt for Northampton v Bedford
John Roberts for Headingley v Northampton
Peter Shillingford for London Scottish v Northampton

- Most tries in a season

10 Dave McLagan for Saracens

== See also ==
- 1987–88 National Division 1
- 1987–88 National Division 3
- 1987–88 Area League North
- 1987–88 Area League South
