= Plymouth Albion R.F.C. =

English rugby union club, based in Plymouth

Coordinates: 50°22′16″N 4°10′13″W

(England) Plymouth Albion
- Full name: Plymouth Albion Rugby Football Club
- Union: Devon RFU
- Founded: 1876; 150 years ago
- Location: Plymouth, Devon, England
- Ground: The Brickfields (Capacity: 8,500)
- Chairman: Graham Hannaford
- Coach: Ryan Lamb
- League: National League 1
- 2025–26: 3rd
Team kit

Official website
- plymouthalbion.com

Plymouth Albion Rugby Football Club is a rugby union club who play in Plymouth, England. The present club was founded in 1920 from a merger between Plymouth RFC (founded 1876) and Devonport Albion RFC (founded 1876). Since 2003 they have played their home games at The Brickfields stadium. Albion's traditional strip and club colours are white, cherry and green.

After thirteen seasons in the second tier of English rugby union, Plymouth Albion finished last in the 2014–15 RFU Championship, and currently play in National League 1.

== Plymouth RFC ==
Formed 1876, the Plymouth Football Club, also known as Plymouth Albion, played at South Devon Place. In 1912, the Northern Union attempted to form a Western League of clubs in Devon and Cornwall. Huddersfield beat Oldham 31–26 in an exhibition game at South Devon Place in front of 7,000 spectators and as a result a meeting was held and the club joined the Northern Union. The first match under the new rules was lost, 22–17, against Coventry on Christmas Day. The club later re-emerged as part of a merger with Devonport Albion to become Plymouth Albion.

== Devonport Albion RFC ==
Albion was formed in 1876 from apprentices at Devonport Dockyard and originally played at Devonport Park. After moving to Bladderly in 1887 they then moved to Home Park in 1893. The club stayed at Home Park for one season only, returning to Bladderley Lane in 1894, then, in 1896, Albion took a 14-year lease of Rectory grounds, (the current home of Devonport Services R.F.C.).

== Current club ==
Devonport Albion continued at the Rectory until it merged with Plymouth RFC to become Plymouth Albion and moved in 1920 to Beacon Park. In 2003, they moved from the run-down Beacon Park ground to a newly built ground, The Brickfields, in Devonport. The Brickfields also has an adjacent athletics stadium.

Albion was present in English rugby union in the 1920s having five internationals on their books at one time. Around this time they attracted a crowd of 18,000 to a midweek game against Oxford University which established a record crowd for a club match in England which was not exceeded until the 1980s.

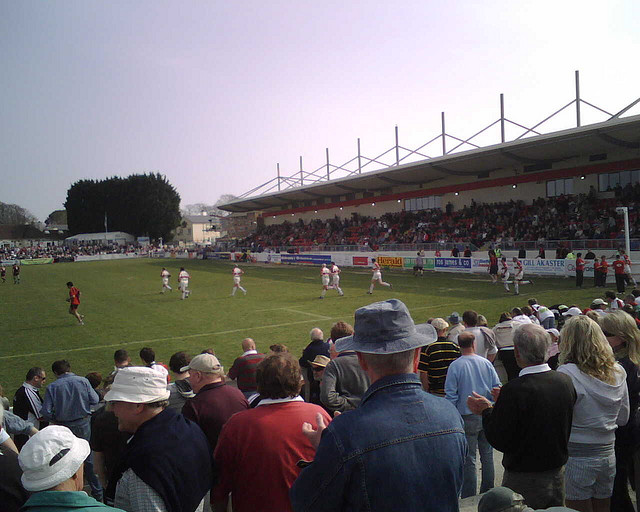
At match between Plymouth Albion and Cornish Pirates at The Brickfields in 2007

They were promoted to National Division One in 2002, and finished third in the 2003–04 season. Observers say it was Plymouth Albion's best position nationally since the 1920s. On their way to promotion, the team went on a two-season unbeaten streak of over 50 games, starting when the club was in Division Three South and ending after their promotion to National Division One.

The club's principal local rival is the Exeter Chiefs, whose home ground is Sandy Park, located near the M5 motorway. Matches between the two clubs are considered local derbies within Devon rugby. The rivalry has contributed to increased interest in rugby union in the country.

Albion currently play in the National League 1, the third tier of English club rugby. The club have financial problems and only avoided entering administration early in 2015 following a cash injection of £250,000 by local businesses. Albion entered administration on 8 April 2016 and were deducted 30 pts by the RFU. Following administration they were taken over by former players, Bruce Priday and David Venables who put forward a business case to the RFU. Since then, Priday has moved to pastures new, whilst Max Venables is the club's Managing Director.

The club also had a successful women's team and a new Under 18s Academy. They played their first game against a Cornwall XV in February 2019, finishing 50 – 7 victors.

Throughout the 2020s, Plymouth Albion RFC has continued to rebuild its status as a prominent rugby club in the English game. Competing in National League 1, the club has placed increasing emphasis on sustainable growth, talent development, and deeper community connections. Under head coach Ryan Lamb, Albion has worked to develop a competitive squad, blending experienced players with young, emerging talent.

The 2025–26 season marks a major milestone in the club’s long history — its 150th anniversary. Pre-season fixtures against Bridgend, Exeter Chiefs U23s, and St Austell form part of the club’s build-up to the new campaign. In May 2025, a testimonial event was held at Brickfields for prop Dan Pullinger, celebrating over a decade of service and more than 200 appearances in an Albion shirt.

The club has also strengthened its leadership team across key operational areas.

- Managing Director: Max Venables
- Commercial Director: James Greenacre
- General Manager: Nicola Westlake
- Media and Marketing Manager: Paul Nicholson
- Community Lead: Safiaa Ibrahim

Plymouth Albion has secured several new commercial partnerships ahead of the 2025–26 season, including Sanderson Weatherall, Agile Comms, and PQA Academy. Former Albion captain Mark Slade, now Head of Agency at Sanderson Weatherall, was instrumental in re-establishing links between the firm and the club.

== Current standings ==
2026–27 National League 1 table
| Pos | Team | Pld | W | D | L | PF | PA | PD | TB | LB | Pts | Qualification |
|---|---|---|---|---|---|---|---|---|---|---|---|---|
| 1 | Plymouth Albion | 6 | 6 | 0 | 0 | 323 | 78 | +245 | 6 | 0 | 30 | Promotion place |
| 2 | Tonbridge Juddians | 6 | 6 | 0 | 0 | 252 | 235 | +17 | 6 | 0 | 30 | Promotion play-off |
| 3 | Camborne | 6 | 5 | 0 | 1 | 222 | 170 | +52 | 5 | 0 | 25 | Promotion play-off |
| 4 | Sale FC | 6 | 4 | 0 | 2 | 252 | 172 | +80 | 4 | 1 | 21 | |
| 5 | Leeds Tykes | 6 | 3 | 0 | 3 | 219 | 156 | +63 | 4 | 3 | 19 | |
| 6 | Bishop's Stortford | 6 | 3 | 0 | 3 | 216 | 206 | +10 | 5 | 1 | 18 | |
| 7 | Rosslyn Park | 6 | 3 | 0 | 3 | 209 | 214 | −5 | 5 | 1 | 18 | |
| 8 | Birmingham Moseley | 6 | 3 | 0 | 3 | 169 | 222 | −53 | 4 | 0 | 16 | |
| 9 | Rams | 6 | 2 | 1 | 3 | 156 | 184 | −28 | 5 | 1 | 16 | |
| 10 | Dings Crusaders | 6 | 1 | 1 | 4 | 238 | 239 | −1 | 6 | 3 | 15 | |
| 11 | London Scottish | 6 | 2 | 0 | 4 | 205 | 251 | −46 | 4 | 1 | 13 | Relegation play-off |
| 12 | Bury St Edmunds | 6 | 2 | 0 | 4 | 165 | 245 | −80 | 4 | 0 | 12 | Relegation place |
| 13 | Sheffield | 6 | 1 | 0 | 5 | 138 | 220 | −82 | 4 | 2 | 10 | Relegation place |
| 14 | Cambridge | 6 | 0 | 0 | 6 | 175 | 347 | −172 | 5 | 3 | 8 | Relegation place |

Updated to match(es) played on 10 October 2026. Source: National League Rugby
Rules for classification: If teams are level at any stage, tiebreakers are applied in the following order:
1. Number of matches won
2. Number of matches drawn
3. Difference between points for and against
4. Total number of points for
5. Aggregate number of points scored in matches between tied teams
6. Number of matches won excluding the first match, then the second and so on until the tie is settled

== Season summary ==
| Season | League | | | National Cup(s) | | County Cup(s) | |
| Season | Competition (Level) | Position | Points | Competition | Performance | Competition | Performance |
|---|---|---|---|---|---|---|---|
| 1987–88 | Courage 3 (3) | 3rd | 16 | John Player Cup | Quarter-finals | Devon Senior Cup | Winners |
| 1988–89 | Courage 3 (3) | 1st (promoted) | 22 | Pilkington Cup | 3rd Round | | |
| 1989–90 | Courage 2 (2) | 7th | 10 | Pilkington Cup | 3rd Round | | |
| 1990–91 | Courage 2 (2) | 11th | 8 | Pilkington Cup | 2nd Round | | |
| 1991–92 | Courage 2 (2) | 12th (relegated) | 6 | Pilkington Cup | 2nd Round | | |
| 1992–93 | Courage 3 (3) | 12th (relegated) | 0 | Pilkington Cup | 2nd Round | | |
| 1993–94 | Courage 4 (4) | 4th | 18 | Pilkington Cup | 3rd Round | | |
| 1994–95 | Courage 4 (4) | 8th | 10 | Pilkington Cup | 2nd Round | | |
| 1995–96 | Courage 4 (4) | 10th (Note: RFU league restructuring for the 1996–97 season would see Courage League Division 5 abolished and Courage League 4 divided back into two regional divisions. This meant that Plymouth Albion were safe from relegation despite finishing bottom of the league, instead being transferred into the southern section of tier 4.) | 8 | Pilkington Cup | 2nd Round | | |
| 1996–97 | Courage 4 South (4) | 6th | 29 | Pilkington Cup | 2nd Round | | |
| 1997–98 | National 2 South (4) (Note: Courage League 4 South was renamed as National League 2 South for the 1997–98 season.) | 13th (Note: RFU league restructuring for the 1998–99 season due to the expansion of Premiership Two meant that there was no relegation this season and that 13th placed Plymouth Albion were safe from the drop.) | 12 | Tetley's Bitter Cup | 1st Round | | |
| 1998–99 | National 2 South (4) | 12th (Note: More northern based sides would be relegated from National Division 3 at the end of the 1998–99 season which meant that more teams would be relegated from National League 2 North than [National League 2 South to avoid an imbalance of teams. This meant that 12th placed Albion were once again saved from the drop.) | 15 | Tetley's Bitter Cup | 2nd Round | | |
| 1999–00 | National 2 South (4) | 4th | 36 | Tetley's Bitter Cup | 1st Round | | |
| 2000–01 | National 3 South (4) (Note: RFU restructuring meant that National League 2 South became known as National Division 3 South, although it remained a tier 4 league.) | 1st (promoted) (Note: During the 2000–01 title winning campaign Albion boasted a 100% league record of winning all 26 matches.) | 52 | Tetley's Bitter Cup | 4th Round | | |
| 2001–02 | National 2 (3) | 2nd (promoted) | 46 | Powergen Cup | 2nd Round | | |
| 2002–03 | National 1 (2) | 9th | 60 (Note: Although bonus points had been used in tiers 1 and 2 since 2000, the 2002–03 season was Plymouth first experience of them.) | Powergen Cup | 5th Round | | |
| 2003–04 | National 1 (2) | 3rd | 92 | Powergen Cup | 4th Round | | |
| 2004–05 | National 1 (2) | 3rd | 94 | Powergen Cup | 6th Round | | |
| 2005–06 | National 1 (2) | 5th | 75 | Powergen Trophy | Quarter-finals | | |
| 2006–07 | National 1 (2) | 6th | 97 | EDF Energy Cup | Semi-finals | | |
| 2007–08 | National 1 (2) | 8th | 64 | EDF Energy Trophy | Semi-finals | | |
| 2008–09 | National 1 (2) | 11th | 66 | EDF Energy Trophy | 4th Round | | |
| 2009–10 | RFU Championship (2) (Note: As part of the extensive league restructuring by the RFU for the 2009–10 season, National 1 was renamed as the RFU Championship.) | 8th (Note: League position is taken from 1st stage only. The 2009–10 RFU Championship was divided into three stages; Albion finished 8th during the 1st stage (main league), and then 4th in their promotion group during the second stage, failing to qualify for the playoff semi-finals. If you combine the 1st and 2nd stages, Albion would have finished 8th overall.) | 48 (Note: Figure is taken from first stage of the 2009–10 RFU Championship. If you count the second stage (in which Albion gained 5 points), they would have achieved 53 points overall.) | | | British & Irish Cup | Pool Stage |
| 2010–11 | RFU Championship (2) | 10th (Note: League position is taken from 1st stage only. As with the previous season the 2010–11 RFU Championship was divided into three stages; Albion finished 10th during the 1st stage (main league), and then 3rd in their relegation group during the second stage, avoiding relegation. If you combine the 1st and 2nd stages, Albion would have finished 11th overall.) | 36 (Note: Figure is taken from first stage of the 2010–11 RFU Championship. If you count the second stage (in which Albion gained 14 points), they would have achieved 48 points overall.) | | | British & Irish Cup | Pool Stage |
| 2011–12 | RFU Championship (2) | 11th (Note: League position is taken from 1st stage only. As with the previous seasons the 2011–12 RFU Championship was divided into three stages; Albion finished 11th during the 1st stage (main league), and then 2nd in their relegation group during the second stage, avoiding relegation. If you combine the 1st and 2nd stages, Albion would have finished 10th overall.) | 30 (Note: Figure is taken from first stage of the 2011–12 RFU Championship. If you count the second stage (in which Albion gained 24 points), they would have achieved 54 points overall.) | | | British & Irish Cup | Pool Stage |
| 2012–13 | RFU Championship (2) | 9th (Note: The competition format for the 2012–13 RFU Championship changed to a main league stage, with the top 4 sides contesting the playoffs.) | 40 | | | British & Irish Cup | Pool Stage |
| 2013–14 | RFU Championship (2) | 8th | 40 | | | British & Irish Cup | Quarter-finals |
| 2014–15 | RFU Championship (2) | 12th (relegated) | 21 | | | British & Irish Cup | Pool Stage |
| 2015–16 | National League 1 (3) | 7th | 72 (Note: Plymouth Albion were deducted 30 points for going into administration on 8 April 2016.) | | | | |
| 2016–17 | National League 1 (3) | 2nd | 118 | | | | |
| 2017–18 | National League 1 (3) | 3rd | 108 | | | | |
| 2018–19 | National League 1 (3) | 5th | 83 | | | | |
| 2019–20 | National League 1 (3) | 6th | 89.13 (Note: The season was postponed and ultimately cancelled due to the COVID-19 pandemic in the United Kingdom with Albion sitting in 6th, having played 25 games and gained 75 points. The remaining games were calculated on a 'best playing record formula', with Albion remaining in 6th place with 89.13 points.) | | | | |
| 2020–21 | National League 1 (3) | Season cancelled due to the COVID-19 pandemic in the United Kingdom | | | | | |
| 2021–22 | National League 1 (3) | 11th | 60 | | | | |
| 2022-23 | National League 1 (3) | 5th | 78 | | | | |
| 2023–24 | National League 1 (3) | 4th | 77 | | | | |
| 2024–25 | National League 1 (3) | 4th | 91 | | | | |
| 2025–26 | National League 1 (3) | | | | | | |
Green background stands for either league champions (with promotion) or cup winners. Blue background stands for promotion without winning league or losing cup finalists. Pink background stands for relegation.

== Honours ==
- Devon Senior Cup winners (23): 1889, 1891, 1892, 1893, 1895, 1905, 1906, 1908, 1909, 1910, 1911, 1912, 1913, 1914, 1921, 1974, 1977, 1983, 1984, 1985, 1986, 1987, 1988
- Devon RFU Junior Cup winners: 1893 (reserve side)
- Courage League Division 3 champions: 1988–89
- National Division 3 South champions: 2000–01

== Notable former players ==
- (Argentina) Martín Schusterman – Argentine international flanker
- (Canada) Aaron Carpenter – Canadian international flanker
- (Canada) Justin Mensah-Coker – Canadian international wing
- Henry Slade – Exeter and current England international outside centre
- Graham Dawe – Former England international hooker
- Jimmy Peters – England fly-half
- Dan Ward-Smith – England number 8
- Rupeni Nasiga – Fiji international lock
- Nat Saumi – Fiji international full back
- (Namibia) Jané du Toit – Namibian international prop
- (Tonga) David Palu – Tongan international scrum-half
- William Davies – Wales international centre
- Rory Watts-Jones – Wales 7s international player
- Tom Bowen – Current England 7s international player
- (Canada) Sean-Michael Stephen – Canadian international back row forward
- Sam Matavesi – Northampton Saints and Fiji international hooker
- Brett Beukeboom – Canada and Cornish Pirates second row
- Fred Knight – England international, played in England's first game against Australia in 1909

== See also ==
- Devon Rugby Football Union
