= 1988–89 National Division 2 =

Rugby union competition in England

- Countries: England
- Date: 10 September 1988 – 22 April 1989
- Champions: Saracens (1st title)
- Runners-up: Bedford Blues
- Relegated: London Scottish; London Welsh
- Matches played: 66
- Top point scorer: 138 – Andy Kennedy (Saracens)
- Top try scorer: 10 – Dave McLagan (Saracens)

The 1988–89 National Division 2 (sponsored by Courage Brewery) was the second season of the second tier of the English rugby union league system, the Courage Clubs Championship, currently known as Champ Rugby. New sides to the division included Coventry and Sale who had been relegated from the top flight and there had been no promotion into the league.

Saracens, the champions, and runners–up Bedford were promoted to the 1989–90 National Division 1. At the other end of the table, bottom team London Welsh and London Scottish who finished 11th were relegated to the 1989–90 National Division 3.

== Structure ==
Each team played one match against each of the other teams, playing a total of eleven matches each, and for the first time matches were played on fixed Saturdays. The top two clubs were promoted to National Division 1 and the bottom two relegated to National Division 3.

== Participating teams ==
Locations of the 1988–89 National Division 2 teams
1988–89 Greater London National Division 2 teams

Team	Stadium	Capacity	City/Area	Previous season
Bedford	Goldington Road	4,800 (800 seats)	Bedford, Bedfordshire	5th
Blackheath	Rectory Field	3,500 (500 seats)	Greenwich, London	11th (no relegation)
Coventry	Coundon Road	10,000 (1,100 seats)	Coventry, West Midlands	Relegated from National 1 (11th)
Gosforth	North Road	2,000 (400 stand)	Newcastle upon Tyne, Tyne and Wear	10th
Headingley	Clarence Fields	7,850 (850 seats)	Leeds, West Yorkshire	4th
London Irish	The Avenue	3,600 (600 seats)	Sunbury-on-Thames, Surrey	8th
London Scottish	Athletic Ground	7,300 (1,300 seats)	Richmond, London	7th
London Welsh	Old Deer Park	4,500 (1,500 seats)	Richmond, London	9th
Northampton	Franklin's Gardens	6,000 (2,000 seats)	Northampton, Northamptonshire	12th (no relegation)
Richmond	Athletic Ground	7,300 (1,300 seats)	Richmond, London	6th
Sale	Heywood Road	4,000 (500 seats)	Sale, Greater Manchester	Relegated from National 1 (12th)
Saracens	Bramley Road	2,300 (300 seats)	Enfield, London	3rd

== Table ==
1988–89 National Division 2 table
Pos	Team	Pld	W	D	L	PF	PA	PD	Pts	Qualification
1	Saracens (C)	11	11	0	0	288	80	+208	22	Promoted
2	Bedford	11	6	2	3	141	187	−46	14	Promoted
3	Northampton	11	6	1	4	165	131	+34	13	
4	Sale	11	5	2	4	195	152	+43	12	
5	Coventry	11	6	0	5	150	143	+7	12	
6	London Irish	11	5	2	4	194	222	−28	12	
7	Headingley	11	5	1	5	179	136	+43	11	
8	Blackheath	11	4	1	6	181	144	+37	9	
9	Richmond	11	4	1	6	112	216	−104	9	
10	Gosforth	11	4	0	7	176	246	−70	8	
11	London Scottish	11	3	1	7	146	160	−14	7	Relegated
12	London Welsh	11	1	1	9	125	235	−110	3	Relegated

Rules for classification: Points are awarded as follows:
1. 2 pts for a win
2. 1 pt for a draw
3. 0 pts for a loss
  (C) Champions

== Fixtures & Results ==
=== Round 1 ===
10 September 1988

Gosforth	16 – 17	Bedford

North Road

10 September 1988

Headingley	3 – 7	Saracens

Clarence Fields

10 September 1988

London Irish	6 – 29	Coventry

The Avenue

10 September 1988

London Scottish	3 – 3	Northampton

Athletic Ground

10 September 1988

London Welsh	15 – 15	Blackheath

Old Deer Park

10 September 1988

Sale	50 – 9	Richmond

Heywood Road

=== Round 2 ===
September 1988

Bedford Blues	9 – 6	London Scottish

Goldington Road

September 1988

Blackheath	34 – 10	Gosforth

Rectory Field

September 1988

Coventry	7 – 3	Sale

Coundon Road

September 1988

Northampton	19 – 7	Headingley

Franklin's Gardens

September 1988

Richmond	14 – 3	London Welsh

Athletic Ground

September 1988

Saracens	20 – 3	London Irish

Bramley Road

=== Round 3 ===
8 October 1988

Gosforth	16 – 4	Richmond

North Road

8 October 1988

Headingley	7 – 7	Bedford

Clarence Fields

8 October 1988

London Irish	18 – 10	Northampton

The Avenue

8 October 1988

London Scottish	6 – 3	Blackheath

Athletic Ground

8 October 1988

London Welsh	14 – 21	Coventry

Old Deer Park

8 October 1988

Sale	10 – 12	Saracens

Heywood Road

=== Round 4 ===
22 October 1988

Bedford	15 – 21	London Irish

Goldington Road

22 October 1988

Blackheath	21 – 3	Headingley

Rectory Field

22 October 1988

Coventry	19 – 12	Gosforth

Coundon Road

22 October 1988

Northampton	15 – 12	Sale

Franklin's Gardens

22 October 1988

Richmond	12 – 32	London Scottish

Athletic Ground

22 October 1988

Saracens	37 – 4	London Welsh

Bramley Road

=== Round 5 ===
12 November 1988

Bedford	19 – 9	Coventry

Goldington Road

12 November 1988

Blackheath	31 – 3	Richmond

Rectory Field

12 November 1988

Gosforth	34 – 26	London Welsh

North Road

12 November 1988

Headingley	48 – 9	London Irish

Clarence Fields

12 November 1988

London Scottish	16 – 17	Sale

Athletic Ground

12 November 1988

Northampton	6 – 32	Saracens

Franklin's Gardens

=== Round 6 ===
19 November 1988

Coventry	18 – 12	Blackheath

Coundon Road

19 November 1988

London Irish	35 – 7	Gosforth

The Avenue

19 November 1988

London Welsh	29 – 10	London Scottish

Old Deer Park

19 November 1988

Richmond	15 – 12	Northampton

Athletic Ground

19 November 1988

Sale	15 – 24	Headingley

Heywood Road

19 November 1988

Saracens	50 – 10	Bedford

Bramley Road

=== Round 7 ===
26 November 1988

Blackheath	12 – 24	Saracens

Rectory Field

26 November 1988

Gosforth	16 – 14	London Scottish

North Road

26 November 1988

Headingley	24 – 0	London Welsh

Clarence Fields

26 November 1988

London Irish	18 – 18	Sale

The Avenue

26 November 1988

Northampton	42 – 3	Bedford

Franklin's Gardens

26 November 1988

Richmond	12 – 3	Coventry

Athletic Ground

=== Round 8 ===
14 January 1989

Bedford Blues	14 – 3	Richmond

Goldington Road

14 January 1989

Gosforth	29 – 14	Headingley

North Road

14 January 1989

London Scottish	16 – 21	London Irish

Athletic Ground

14 January 1989

London Welsh	9 – 16	Sale

Old Deer Park

14 January 1989

Northampton	15 – 7	Blackheath

Franklin's Gardens

14 January 1989

Saracens	13 – 6	Coventry

Bramley Road

=== Round 9 ===
11 March 1989

Bedford	12– 13	Blackheath

Goldington Road

11 March 1989

Coventry	22 – 10	Northampton

Coundon Road

11 March 1989

London Scottish	22 – 10	Headingley

Athletic Ground

11 March 1989

London Irish	24 – 19	London Welsh

The Avenue

11 March 1989

Richmond	10 – 27	Saracens

Athletic Ground

11 March 1989

Sale	23 – 15	Gosforth

Heywood Road

=== Round 10 ===
8 April 1989

Bedford	18 – 6	London Welsh

Goldington Road

8 April 1989

Blackheath	12 – 16	Sale

Rectory Field

8 April 1989

Coventry	7 – 18	Headingley

Coundon Road

8 April 1989

Northampton	13 – 12	Gosforth

Franklin's Gardens

8 April 1989

Richmond	18 – 18	London Irish

Athletic Ground

8 April 1989

Saracens	19 – 9	London Scottish

Bramley Road

=== Round 11 ===
22 April 1989

Gosforth	9 – 47	Saracens

North Road

22 April 1989

Headingley	9 – 12	Richmond

Clarence Fields

22 April 1989

London Irish	21 – 22	Blackheath

The Avenue

22 April 1989

London Scottish	24 – 9	Coventry

Athletic Ground

22 April 1989

London Welsh	0 – 22	Northampton

Old Deer Park

22 April 1989

Sale	15 – 15	Bedford

Heywood Road

== See also ==
- 1988–89 National Division 1
- 1988–89 National Division 3
- 1988–89 Area League North
- 1988–89 Area League South
