= 1987–88 National Division 1 =

Rugby union competition in England

- Countries: England
- Date: 5 September 1987 – 30 April 1988
- Champions: Leicester (1st title)
- Runners-up: Wasps
- Relegated: Coventry; Sale
- Matches played: 64
- Top point scorer: 126 – Dusty Hare (Leicester)
- Top try scorer: 11 – Andrew Harriman (Harlequins)

The 1987–88 National Division 1 was the first season of the top tier of the English rugby union league system, the Courage Clubs Championship, and the first to be sponsored by Courage Brewery. It was the first season of a truly national rugby union league, with the top flight currently known as Premiership Rugby.

At the end of the season Leicester finished top of the league table and were crowned as the first ever champions, while Coventry and Sale were relegated to the 1988–89 National Division 2, the latter side having lost all of its eleven matches.

== Structure ==
Each team played one match against each of the other teams, playing a total of eleven matches each. For this first season there was no fixture list; the teams arranged fixtures amongst themselves. Most teams played eleven games, although some played ten due to cancellations and there were unequal home and away fixtures, with some sides playing up to seven games at home, while others as little as four. The bottom two sides were relegated to National Division 2.

The points scheme was such that a team received four points for a win, two for a draw and one point for a loss.

== Participating teams ==
Locations of the 1987–88 Courage League National Division One teams

Team	Stadium	Capacity	City/Area
Bath	The Recreation Ground	8,300 (1,000 seats)	Bath, Somerset
Bristol	Memorial Stadium	8,500 (1,200 seats)	Bristol, Avon
Coventry	Coundon Road	10,000 (1,100 seats)	Coventry, West Midlands
Gloucester	Kingsholm	11,100 (1,100 seats)	Gloucester, Gloucestershire
Harlequins	The Stoop	9,000 (2,000 seats)	Twickenham, London
Leicester	Welford Road	14,700 (9,200 seats)	Leicester, Leicestershire
Moseley	The Reddings	9,999 (1,800 seats)	Birmingham, West Midlands
Nottingham	Ireland Avenue	4,990 (590 seats)	Beeston, Nottinghamshire
Orrell	Edge Hall Road	5,300 (300 seats)	Orrell, Greater Manchester
Sale	Heywood Road	4,000 (500 seats)	Sale, Greater Manchester
Wasps	Repton Avenue	3,200 (1,200 seats)	Sudbury, London
Waterloo	St Anthony's Road	9,950 (950 seats)	Blundellsands, Merseyside

== League table ==
Pos	Team	Pld	W	D	L	PF	PA	PD	Pts	Qualification
1	Leicester (C)	10	9	0	1	225	133	+92	37	Champions
2	Wasps	11	8	1	2	218	136	+82	36	
3	Harlequins	11	6	1	4	261	128	+133	30	
4	Bath	11	6	1	4	197	156	+41	30	
5	Gloucester	10	6	1	3	206	121	+85	29	
6	Orrell	11	5	1	5	192	153	+39	27	
7	Moseley	11	5	0	6	167	170	−3	26	
8	Nottingham	11	4	1	6	146	170	−24	24	
9	Bristol	10	4	1	5	171	145	+26	23	
10	Waterloo	10	4	0	6	123	208	−85	22	
11	Coventry (R)	11	3	1	7	139	246	−107	21	Relegated
12	Sale (R)	11	0	0	11	95	374	−279	11	Relegated

Rules for classification: Points are awarded as follows:
1. 4 pts for a win
2. 2 pt for a draw
3. 1 pt for a loss
  (C) Champions; (R) Relegated

== Results table ==
The home team is listed in the left column.

Home \ Away	BAT	BRI	COV	GLO	HAR	LEI	MOS	NOT	ORR	SAL	WAS	WAT
Bath Rugby		15–9			21–9		14–0		23–18			10–17
Bristol Rugby				16–21			21–10			37–3	12–12	
Coventry	9–9	25–3			12–15			15–20	11–24	24–19		15–10
Gloucester RFC	9–16		39–3				18–12	17–9		61–7	13–24	
Harlequins		28–22		9–9		9–12		34–8	6–12	66–0		37–4
Leicester	24–13	15–10	32–16							42–15	12–9	39–15
Moseley			26–3		11–32	3–21			28–10		19–12	27–3
Nottingham	25–15	3–16				13–22	21–12		12–12			
Orrell		13–25		9–13		30–6				19–0		30–6
Sale	17–46						15–19	0–17			6–14	
Wasps	19–15		49–6		17–16			17–9	23–15			
Waterloo				16–6				10–9		29–13	13–22	

Legend: Blue = home team win; Yellow = draw; Red = away team win.

== Fixtures and results ==
Clubs had to organise their own fixtures so there was no organised round by round fixture lists and also no equal allocation of home and away matches. Dates of games and results are given below in date order.

=== September 1987 ===
5 September 1987

Nottingham	21 – 12	Moseley

Ireland Avenue

12 September 1987

Gloucester	30 – 3	Coventry

Kingsholm
Referee: Laurie Prideaux

12 September 1987

Leicester	23 – 13	Bath

Welford Road
Referee: Fred Howard

12 September 1987

Sale	0 – 17	Nottingham

Heywood Road

19 September 1987

Bath	14 – 0	Moseley

The Recreation Ground

26 September 1987

Bristol	16 – 21	Gloucester

Memorial Stadium
Referee: Roger Quittenton

26 September 1987

Coventry	24 – 19	Sale

Coundon Road

26 September 1987

Harlequins	9 – 12	Leicester

The Stoop

26 September 1987

Nottingham	12 – 12	Orrell

Ireland Avenue

30 September 1987

Coventry	15 – 20	Nottingham

Coundon Road

=== October 1987 ===
3 October 1987

Leicester	32 – 16	Coventry

Welford Road

3 October 1987

Sale	15 – 19	Moseley

Heywood Road

10 October 1987

Bristol	12 – 12	Wasps

Memorial Stadium

10 October 1987

Moseley	28 – 10	Orrell

The Reddings

10 October 1987

Nottingham	25 – 15	Bath

Ireland Avenue
Referee: Tony Trigg

17 October 1987

Bath	15 – 9	Bristol

The Recreation Ground
Attendance: 7,000
Referee: S K Trevithick

17 October 1987

Waterloo	10 – 9	Nottingham

St Anthony's Road

24 October 1987

Bristol	37 – 3	Sale

Memorial Stadium

24 October 1987

Gloucester	17 – 9	Nottingham

Kingsholm
Referee: Fred Howard

24 October 1987

Moseley	26 – 3	Coventry

The Reddings

31 October 1987

Nottingham	3 – 16	Bristol

Ireland Avenue

31 October 1987

Waterloo	16 – 6	Gloucester

St Anthony's Road
Referee: Tony Trigg

=== November 1987 ===
7 November 1987

Orrell	19 – 0	Sale

Edge Hall Road

14 November 1987

Nottingham	13 – 22	Leicester

Ireland Avenue

14 November 1987

Orrell	13 – 25	Bristol

Edge Hall Road

14 November 1987

Wasps	19 – 15	Bath

Repton Avenue

21 November 1987

Coventry	9 – 9	Bath

Coundon Road

21 November 1987

Harlequins	9 – 9	Gloucester

The Stoop
Referee: Tony Spreadbury

21 November 1987

Leicester	12 – 9	Wasps

Welford Road

28 November 1987

Moseley	3 – 21	Leicester

The Reddings

28 November 1987

Wasps	17 – 9	Nottingham

Repton Avenue

=== December 1987 ===
1 December 1987

Gloucester	9 – 16	Bath

Kingsholm
Attendance: 7,000
Referee: R Parks

12 December 1987

Bath	10 – 17	Waterloo

The Recreation Ground

12 December 1987

Bristol	21 – 10	Moseley

Memorial Stadium

19 December 1987

Leicester	15 – 10	Bristol

Welford Road

=== January 1988 ===
1 January 1988

Gloucester	18 – 12	Moseley

Kingsholm
Referee: Laurie Prideaux

2 January 1988

Wasps	17 – 16	Harlequins

Repton Avenue

2 January 1988

Waterloo	29 – 13	Sale

St Anthony's Road

13 February 1988

Gloucester	13 – 24	Wasps

Kingsholm
Referee: Fred Howard

=== February 1988 ===
5 February 1988

Moseley	19 – 12	Wasps

The Reddings

6 February 1988

Coventry	15 – 10	Waterloo

Coundon Road

6 February 1988

Harlequins	6 – 12	Orrell

The Stoop

20 February 1988

Orrell	30 – 6	Leicester

Edge Hall Road

27 February 1988

Harlequins	37 – 4	Waterloo

The Stoop

=== March 1988 ===
5 March 1988

Moseley	11 – 32	Harlequins

The Reddings

12 March 1988

Sale	6 – 14	Wasps

Heywood Road

19 March 1988

Coventry	12 – 15	Harlequins

Coundon Road

19 March 1988

Orrell	9 – 13	Gloucester

Edge Hall Road
Referee: A P Thompson

26 March 1988

Bath	23 – 18	Orrell

The Recreation Ground

26 March 1988

Leicester	42 – 15	Sale

Welford Road

=== April 1988 ===
1 April 1988

Harlequins	34 – 8	Nottingham

The Stoop

2 April 1988

Waterloo	13 – 22	Wasps

St Anthony's Road

4 April 1988

Leicester	39 – 15	Waterloo

Welford Road

9 April 1988

Bath	21 – 9	Harlequins

The Recreation Ground

13 April 1988

Wasps	49 – 6	Coventry

Repton Avenue

16 April 1988

Gloucester	61 – 7	Sale

Kingsholm
Referee: M J Edwards

16 April 1988

Orrell	30 – 6	Waterloo

Edge Hall Road

23 April 1988

Harlequins	66 – 0	Sale

The Stoop

23 April 1988

Coventry	25 – 3	Bristol

Coundon Road

23 April 1988

Wasps	23 – 15	Orrell

Repton Avenue

26 April 1988

Moseley	27 – 3	Waterloo

The Reddings

30 April 1988

Coventry	11 – 24	Orrell

Coundon Road

30 April 1988

Harlequins	28 – 22	Bristol

Twickenham Stadium
Attendance: 37,000
Referee: Fred Howard

- League and cup double header. The 1988 John Player Cup final would also count as Harlequins v Bristol Courage League game.

30 April 1988

Sale	17 – 46	Bath

Heywood Road

=== Cancelled games ===
Bristol	C – C	Waterloo

Memorial Stadium

Leicester	C – C	Gloucester

Welford Road

== See also ==
- 1987–88 National Division 2
- 1987–88 National Division 3
- 1987–88 Area League North
- 1987–88 Area League South
