= 1987–88 Area League North =

Rugby union competition in England

- Countries: England
- Champions: Rugby (1st title)
- Runners-up: Durham City (not promoted)
- Relegated: Solihull, Derby, Birkenhead Park
- Matches played: 110

The 1987–88 Area League North was the first full season of rugby union within the fourth tier of the English league system, currently known as National League 2 North, and was the counterpart to Area League South (later National League 2 South). Each team played one match against the other teams, playing a total of ten matches each. There was no set date for matches, clubs having to arrange the fixtures among themselves.

Rugby were the first ever champions, gaining promotion to the 1988–89 National Division 3 while Solihull, Derby and Birkenhead Park were the relegated sides. Solihull and Derby dropped to Midlands 1 while Birkenhead Park fell into North 1.

== Structure ==
Each team played one match against each of the other teams, playing a total of ten matches each. The champions are promoted to National Division 3 and the bottom three teams were relegated to either North 1 or Midlands 1 depending on their locality. The reason that there were three relegated teams (compared to the 1987–88 Courage Area League South) was that both teams relegated from National Division 3 were based in the northern section of the country.

== Participating teams and locations ==
Locations of the 1987–88 Area League North teams

Team	Ground	Capacity	City/Area
Birkenhead Park	Upper Park	8,000	Birkenhead, Wirral
Broughton Park	Chelsfield Grove	2,000 (400 seats)	Chorlton-cum-Hardy, Manchester
Derby	Kedleston Road	1,200 (200 seats)	Derby, Derbyshire
Durham City	Hollow Drift	3,000 (500 seats)	Durham, County Durham
Lichfield	Cooke Fields	5,460 (460 seats)	Lichfield, Staffordshire
Northern	McCracken Park	1,200 (200 seats)	Newcastle upon Tyne, Tyne and Wear
Preston Grasshoppers	Lightfoot Green	2,250 (250 seats)	Preston, Lancashire
Roundhay	Chandos Park	3,000	Roundhay, Leeds West Yorkshire
Rugby	Webb Ellis Road	3,200 (200 seats)	Rugby, Warwickshire
Solihull	Sharmans Cross	4,000	Solihull, West Midlands
Stourbridge	Stourton Park	2,000	Stourbridge, West Midlands

== League table ==
1987–88 Area League North table
Pos	Team	Pld	W	D	L	PF	PA	PD	Pts	Qualification
1	Rugby (C)	10	9	0	1	184	100	+84	18	Promoted
2	Durham City	10	8	0	2	165	100	+65	16	
3	Roundhay	10	6	2	2	131	67	+64	14	
4	Preston Grasshoppers	10	5	1	4	178	149	+29	11	
5	Northern	10	5	1	4	121	137	−16	11	
6	Broughton Park	10	5	0	5	152	106	+46	10	
7	Stourbridge	10	5	0	5	132	134	−2	10	
8	Lichfield	10	4	0	6	150	165	−15	8	
9	Birkenhead Park (R)	10	4	0	6	117	179	−62	8	Relegated
10	Derby (R)	10	2	0	8	136	169	−33	4	Relegated
11	Solihull (R)	10	0	0	10	59	219	−160	0	Relegated

Rules for classification: Points are awarded as follows:
1. 2 pts for a win
2. 1 pt for a draw
3. 0 pts for a loss
If teams are level at any stage, difference between points for and against applies
(C) Champions; (R) Relegated

== Sponsorship ==
Area League North is part of the Courage Clubs Championship and was sponsored by Courage Brewery.

== See also ==
- 1987–88 National Division 1
- 1987–88 National Division 2
- 1987–88 National Division 3
- 1987–88 Area League South
