= 1989–90 Area League South =

Rugby union competition in England

- Countries: England
- Champions: Metropolitan Police (1st title)
- Runners-up: Clifton (also promoted)
- Relegated: Salisbury
- Matches played: 110

The 1989–90 Area League South was the third full season of rugby union within the fourth tier of the English league system, later known as National League 2 South, and counterpart to Area League North (now known as National League 2 North). It would be the last season the division would be known as Area League South and would be renamed as National Division 4 South for the following year.

Metropolitan Police won the championship winning nine of their ten league matches and were promoted to the 1990–91 National Division 3. Clifton (also promoted) came second, one point behind, and were the only team to defeat the champions. Only one team, Salisbury was relegated and they will play in South West Division One next season.

== Structure ==
Each team played one match against each of the other teams, playing a total of ten matches each. The champions are promoted to National Division 3 and the bottom team are relegated to either London Division One or South West One depending on their locality.

== Participating teams and locations ==
Locations of the 1989–90 Area League South teams

Team	Ground	Capacity	City/Area	Previous season
Basingstoke	Down Grange	2,500	Basingstoke, Hampshire	Promoted from London 1 (champions)
Camborne	Recreation Ground	11,000	Camborne, Cornwall	3rd
Cheltenham	Prince of Wales	3,500 (500 seats)	Cheltenham, Gloucestershire	6th
Clifton	Station Road	2,200 (200 seats)	Cribbs Causeway, Henbury, Bristol	Promoted from South West 1 (champions)
Havant	Hook's Lane	3,000 (200 seats)	Havant, Hampshire	2nd
Maidstone	William Davey Memorial	2,000 (100 seats)	Maidstone, Kent	Relegated from National 3 (12th)
Metropolitan Police	Imber Court	3,500 (500 seats)	East Molesey, Surrey	Relegated from National 3 (11th)
Redruth	Recreation Ground	12,000	Redruth, Cornwall	4th
Salisbury	Castle Road	1,500	Salisbury, Wiltshire	7th
Southend	Warners Park	1,500 (150 seats)	Southend, Essex	8th
Sudbury	Moorsfield	1,000	Sudbury, Suffolk	5th

== League table ==
1989–90 Area League South table
Pos	Team	Pld	W	D	L	PF	PA	PD	Pts	Qualification
1	Metropolitan Police (C)	10	9	0	1	255	74	+181	18	Promoted
2	Clifton (P)	10	8	1	1	240	122	+118	17	Promoted
3	Redruth	10	7	0	3	151	84	+67	14	
4	Camborne	10	6	1	3	164	113	+51	13	
5	Havant	10	5	1	4	132	126	+6	11	
6	Sudbury	10	5	0	5	162	138	+24	10	
7	Southend	10	4	2	4	124	125	−1	10	
8	Basingstoke	10	3	1	6	138	144	−6	7	
9	Cheltenham	10	2	0	8	107	201	−94	4	
10	Maidstone	10	2	0	8	64	237	−173	4	
11	Salisbury (R)	10	1	0	9	74	247	−173	2	Relegated

Rules for classification: Points are awarded as follows:
1. 2 pts for a win
2. 1 pt for a draw
3. 0 pts for a loss
If teams are level at any stage, difference between points for and against applies
(C) Champions; (P) Promoted; (R) Relegated

== Sponsorship ==
Area League South is part of the Courage Clubs Championship and is sponsored by Courage Brewery.

== See also ==
- 1989–90 National Division 1
- 1989–90 National Division 2
- 1989–90 National Division 3
- 1989–90 Area League North
