= 1988–89 Area League South =

Rugby union competition in England

- Countries: England
- Champions: Lydney (1st title)
- Runners-up: Havant
- Relegated: Sidcup, Stroud, Ealing
- Matches played: 110

The 1988–89 Area League South was the second full season of rugby union within the fourth tier of the English league system, later known as National League 2 South, and counterpart to Area League North (now known as National League 2 North). Lydney won the championship despite having an identical win/draw/lose record to Havant in second place, and finished top due to a superior points difference, gaining promotion to the 1989–90 National Division 3. Three teams were relegated; Ealing (to London Division 1), Stroud (to South West Division 1) and Sidcup (to London Division 1). Last season Sidcup finished second, and this season lost all ten matches.

== Structure ==
Each team played one match against each of the other teams, playing a total of ten matches each. This was the first season of fixed Saturdays for league matches. The champions are promoted to National Division 3 and the last three teams are relegated to either London 1 or South West 1 depending on their locality.

== Participating teams and locations ==
Locations of the 1988–89 Area League South teams

Team	Ground	Capacity	City/Area	Previous season
Camborne	Recreation Ground	11,000	Camborne, Cornwall	4th
Cheltenham	Prince of Wales	3,500 (500 seats)	Cheltenham, Gloucestershire	10th
Ealing	Horsenden Hill		Horsenden Hill, Ealing, London	Promoted from London 1 (champions)
Havant	Hook's Lane	3,000 (200 seats)	Havant, Hampshire	5th
Lydney	Regentsholme	3,000 (340 seats)	Lydney, Gloucestershire	3rd
Redruth	Recreation Ground	12,000	Redruth, Cornwall	Promoted from South West 1 (champions)
Salisbury	Castle Road	1,500	Salisbury, Wiltshire	9th
Sidcup	Crescent Farm		Sidcup, Kent	2nd
Southend	Warners Park	1,500 (150 seats)	Southend, Essex	7th
Stroud	Fromehall Park	4,000 (200 seats)	Stroud, Gloucestershire	6th
Sudbury	Moorsfield	1,000	Sudbury, Suffolk	8th

== League table ==
1988–89 Area League South table
Pos	Team	Pld	W	D	L	PF	PA	PD	Pts	Qualification
1	Lydney (C)	10	8	1	1	240	98	+142	17	Promoted
2	Havant	10	8	1	1	177	92	+85	17	
3	Camborne	10	6	1	3	198	126	+72	13	
4	Redruth	10	6	1	3	136	81	+55	13	
5	Sudbury	10	5	1	4	141	89	+52	11	
6	Cheltenham	10	4	2	4	122	151	−29	10	
7	Salisbury	10	4	1	5	113	139	−26	9	
8	Southend	10	4	0	6	116	168	−52	8	
9	Ealing (R)	10	3	0	7	144	188	−44	6	Relegated
10	Stroud (R)	10	3	0	7	119	180	−61	6	Relegated
11	Sidcup (R)	10	0	0	10	74	168	−94	0	Relegated

Rules for classification: Points are awarded as follows:
1. 2 pts for a win
2. 1 pt for a draw
3. 0 pts for a loss
If teams are level at any stage, difference between points for and against applies
(C) Champions; (R) Relegated

== Sponsorship ==
Area League South is part of the Courage Clubs Championship and is sponsored by Courage Brewery.

== See also ==
- 1988–89 National Division 1
- 1988–89 National Division 2
- 1988–89 National Division 3
- 1988–89 Area League North
