= 1989–90 National Division 1 =

Rugby union competition in England

- Countries: England
- Date: 9 September 1989 – 28 April 1990
- Champions: Wasps (1st title)
- Runners-up: Gloucester
- Relegated: Bedford
- Matches played: 66
- Top point scorer: 126 – John Liley (Leicester)
- Top try scorer: 10 – Anthony Swift (Bath)

The 1989–90 National Division 1 (sponsored by Courage Brewery) was the third season of the top tier of the English rugby union league system, the Courage Clubs Championship, currently known as Premiership Rugby. Bath were the defending champions while Saracens and Bedford were the promoted sides.

A very competitive league was won by Wasps, pipping Gloucester to the title by just one point, with Bath and Saracens not far behind in 3rd and 4th spot. Bedford were the relegated side, losing all 11 fixtures to finish bottom of the table and drop down to the 1990–91 National Division 2.

== Structure ==
Each team played one match against each of the other teams, playing a total of eleven matches each. Due to the expansion of the league from twelve to thirteen teams for the following season, only the bottom club would be relegated to National Division 2.

== Participating teams ==
Locations of the 1989–90 Courage League National Division One teams

Team	Stadium	Capacity	City/Area	Previous season
Bath	Recreation Ground	8,300 (1,000 seats)	Bath, Somerset	Champions
Bedford	Goldington Road	4,800 (800 seats)	Bedford, Bedfordshire	Promoted from National 2 (2nd)
Bristol	Memorial Stadium	8,500 (1,200 seats)	Bristol, Avon	7th
Gloucester	Kingsholm	11,100 (1,100 seats)	Gloucester, Gloucestershire	2nd
Harlequins	The Stoop	9,000 (2,000 seats)	Twickenham, London	8th
Leicester	Welford Road	14,700 (9,200 seats)	Leicester, Leicestershire	6th
Moseley	The Reddings	9,999 (1,800 seats)	Birmingham, West Midlands	10th
Nottingham	Ireland Avenue	4,990 (590 seats)	Beeston, Nottinghamshire	4th
Orrell	Edge Hall Road	5,300 (300 seats)	Orrell, Greater Manchester	5th
Rosslyn Park	The Rock	4,630 (630 seats)	Roehampton, London	9th
Saracens	Bramley Road	2,300 (300 seats)	Enfield, London	Promoted from National 2 (1st)
Wasps	Repton Avenue	3,200 (1,200 seats)	Sudbury, London	3rd

== Table ==
Pos	Team	Pld	W	D	L	PF	PA	PD	Pts
1	Wasps (C)	11	9	0	2	250	106	+144	18
2	Gloucester	11	8	1	2	214	139	+75	17
3	Bath	11	8	0	3	258	104	+154	16
4	Saracens	11	7	1	3	168	167	+1	15
5	Leicester	11	6	0	5	248	184	+64	12
6	Nottingham	11	6	0	5	187	148	+39	12
7	Harlequins	11	6	0	5	218	180	+38	12
8	Orrell	11	5	0	6	221	132	+89	10
9	Bristol	11	4	0	7	136	144	−8	8
10	Rosslyn Park	11	4	0	7	164	243	−79	8
11	Moseley	11	2	0	9	138	258	−120	4
12	Bedford (R)	11	0	0	11	70	467	−397	0

(C) Champions; (R) Relegated

== Results ==
The home team is listed in the left column.

Home \ Away	BAT	BED	BRI	GLO	HAR	LEI	MOS	NOT	ORR	ROS	SAR	WAS
Bath		76–0			32–12	26–15	27–9					
Bedford			6–16		8–71		0–24		7–25		3–22	9–44
Bristol	13–14			6–13		11–13		13–9		6–15		21–22
Gloucester	13–6	37–6			24–9				16–10	41–12	21–21	
Harlequins			13–7			15–12		22–27	15–9	19–15		12–9
Leicester		60–3		16–26				15–6			34–6	
Moseley			10–16	12–16	22–21	20–38		6–22				0–42
Nottingham	12–9	47–16		12–3					9–25	6–11	25–12	
Orrell	6–9		12–15			33–10	25–13			64–14		
Rosslyn Park	6–34	45–12				9–23	18–9				13–15	6–14
Saracens	9–7		17–12		15–9		33–13		12–6			
Wasps	9–18			29–4		29–12		16–12	12–6		24–6	

Legend: Blue = home team win; Yellow = draw; Red = away team win.

== Fixtures & Results ==
=== Round 1 ===
9 September 1989

Bath	32 – 12	Harlequins

Recreation Ground
Referee: C J High

9 September 1989

Bedford	3 – 22	Saracens

Goldington Road

9 September 1989

Moseley	12 – 16	Gloucester

The Reddings
Referee: Tony Spreadbury

9 September 1989

Nottingham	6 – 11	Rosslyn Park

Ireland Avenue

9 September 1989

Orrell	12 – 15	Bristol

Edge Hall Road

9 September 1989

Wasps	29 – 12	Leicester

Repton Avenue

=== Round 2 ===
23 September 1989

Bristol	13 – 9	Nottingham

Memorial Stadium

23 September 1989

Gloucester	13 – 6	Bath

Kingsholm
Referee: Fred Howard

23 September 1989

Harlequins	12 – 9	Wasps

The Stoop

23 September 1989

Leicester	60 – 3	Bedford

Welford Road

23 September 1989

Rosslyn Park	18 – 9	Moseley

The Rock

23 September 1989

Saracens	12 – 6	Orrell

Bramley Road

=== Round 3 ===
14 October 1989

Bath	34 – 6	Rosslyn Park

Recreation Ground
Referee: Matt Bayliss

14 October 1989

Bedford	8 – 71	Harlequins

Goldington Road

14 October 1989

Moseley	10 – 16	Bristol

The Reddings

14 October 1989

Nottingham	25 – 12	Saracens

Ireland Avenue

14 October 1989

Orrell	33 – 10	Leicester

Edge Hall Road

14 October 1989

Wasps	29 – 4	Gloucester

Repton Avenue
Referee: Colin High

=== Round 4 ===
28 October 1989

Bristol	13 – 14	Bath

Memorial Stadium
Referee: Laurie Prideaux

28 October 1989

Gloucester	37 – 6	Bedford

Kingsholm
Referee: Tony Trigg

28 October 1989

Harlequins	15 – 9	Orrell

The Stoop

28 October 1989

Leicester	15 – 6	Nottingham

Welford Road

28 October 1989

Rosslyn Park	6 – 14	Wasps

The Rock

28 October 1989

Saracens	33 – 13	Moseley

Bramley Road

=== Round 5 ===
11 November 1989

Bath	27 – 9	Moseley

Recreation Ground
Referee: R Quittenton

11 November 1989

Bedford	7 – 25	Orrell

Goldington Road

11 November 1989

Gloucester	41 – 12	Rosslyn Park

Kingsholm
Referee: S V Griffiths

11 November 1989

Harlequins	13 – 7	Bristol

The Stoop

11 November 1989

Leicester	34 – 6	Saracens

Welford Road

11 November 1989

Wasps	16 – 12	Nottingham

Repton Avenue

=== Round 6 ===
18 November 1989

Bristol	6 – 13	Gloucester

Memorial Stadium
Referee: Ian Bullerwell

18 November 1989

Moseley	0 – 42	Wasps

The Reddings

18 November 1989

Nottingham	47 – 16	Bedford

Ireland Avenue

18 November 1989

Orrell	6 – 9	Bath

Edge Hall Road

18 November 1989

Rosslyn Park	9 – 23	Leicester

The Rock

18 November 1989

Saracens	15 – 9	Harlequins

Bramley Road

=== Round 7 ===
25 November 1989

Bedford	0 – 24	Moseley

Goldington Road

25 November 1989

Bristol	6 – 15	Rosslyn Park

Memorial Stadium

25 November 1989

Gloucester	21 – 21	Saracens

Kingsholm
Referee: David Hudson

25 November 1989

Harlequins	15 – 12	Leicester

The Stoop

25 November 1989

Nottingham	9 – 25	Orrell

Ireland Avenue

25 November 1989

Wasps	9 – 18	Bath

Repton Avenue

=== Round 8 ===
13 January 1990

Bath	76 – 0	Bedford

Recreation Ground

13 January 1990

Harlequins	19 – 15	Rosslyn Park

The Stoop

13 January 1990

Leicester	16 – 26	Gloucester

Welford Road
Referee: Colin High

13 January 1990

Moseley	6 – 22	Nottingham

The Reddings

13 January 1990

Saracens	17 – 12	Bristol

Bramley Road

13 January 1990

Wasps	12 – 6	Orrell

Repton Avenue

=== Round 9 ===
10 March 1990

Bedford	9 – 44	Wasps

Goldington Road

10 March 1990

Bristol	11 – 13	Leicester

Memorial Stadium

10 March 1990

Gloucester	24 – 9	Harlequins

Kingsholm
Referee: G Seddon

10 March 1990

Nottingham	12 – 9	Bath

Ireland Avenue

10 March 1990

Orrell	25 – 13	Moseley

Edge Hall Road

10 March 1990

Rosslyn Park	13 – 15	Saracens

The Rock

=== Round 10 ===
31 March 1990

Bristol	21 – 22	Wasps

Memorial Stadium

31 March 1990

Gloucester	16 – 10	Orrell

Kingsholm
Referee: David Leslie

31 March 1990

Harlequins	22 – 27	Nottingham

The Stoop

31 March 1990

Leicester	38 – 20	Moseley

Welford Road

31 March 1990

Rosslyn Park	45 – 12	Bedford

The Rock

31 March 1990

Saracens	9 – 7	Bath

Bramley Road

=== Round 11 ===
28 April 1990

Bath	26 – 15	Leicester

Recreation Ground
Referee: D W Matthews

28 April 1990

Bedford	6 – 16	Bristol

Goldington Road

- Bedford are relegated.

28 April 1990

Moseley	22 – 21	Harlequins

The Reddings

28 April 1990

Nottingham	12 – 3	Gloucester

Ireland Avenue
Referee: Roger Quittenton

28 April 1990

Orrell	64 – 14	Rosslyn Park

Edge Hall Road

28 April 1990

Wasps	24 – 6	Saracens

Repton Avenue

- Wasps are champions.

== See also ==
- 1989–90 National Division 2
- 1989–90 National Division 3
- 1989–90 Area League North
- 1989–90 Area League South
