= Rory Watts-Jones =

Welsh rugby union footballer (born 1988)

- Born: Rory Watts-Jones; 15 December 1988 (age 37) Cowbridge, Wales
- Height: 188 cm (6 ft 2 in)
- Weight: 99 kg (15 st 8 lb)
- University: University of Plymouth

Rugby union career
- Position: Flanker
Youth career
- Cowbridge RFC
- 2009-2011: Plymouth Albion R.F.C.
- 2011-2012: Cardiff RFC
Senior career
Years	Team	Apps	(Points)
2012-2015	Cardiff Blues		(0)
- Correct as of December 2012
National sevens team
Years	Team		Comps
- Wales 7s

Rory Watts-Jones (born 15 December 1988) is a retired Welsh rugby union player. A flanker, he played club rugby for Cardiff Blues regional team.

Born and raised in Cowbridge, Watts-Jones joined Cowbridge RFC and played for the Wales under-16s team. Having gained a place at the University of Plymouth, he joined their rugby club, where he came to the attention of Plymouth Albion R.F.C. coach Graham Dawe. Watts-Jones made his debut from the bench in January 2009, against Doncaster R.F.C. in the EDF Energy Trophy. Starting 35 games and playing in a further 12 from the bench, he also played for the Wales Sevens team.

Having finished his university course, in June 2011 he joined Cardiff RFC, and then graduated to the regional Cardiff Blues squad. He made his debut against Connacht in September 2012. In November 2014, whilst playing against Newcastle Falcons in the Anglo-Welsh Cup when he scored a decisive try, he suffered a concussion related injury.

The Blues took Watts-Jones through the WRU defined graduated return-to-play protocol, but noted that he was fairly slow going through the process. His family and girlfriend then noted that his behaviour was different from previous concussive recovery episodes. Referred to a specialist doctor, after further tests Watts-Jones was advised to retire due to a concussion-related injury. On 17 February 2015, the club and Watts-Jones announced his reluctant retirement from rugby, based on medical grounds with regards his long-term health.
