= 1987–88 Area League South =

Rugby union competition in England

- Countries: England
- Champions: Askeans (1st title)
- Runners-up: Sidcup
- Relegated: Streatham-Croydon
- Matches played: 110

The 1987–88 Area League South was the first full season of rugby union within the fourth tier of the English league system, later known as the National League 2 South, and was the counterpart to Area League North (now National League 2 North). Each team played one match against the other teams, playing a total of ten matches each. There was no set date for matches, clubs having to arrange the fixtures amongst themselves.

Askeans were the first ever champions, gaining promotion to the 1988–89 National Division 3 while Streatham-Croydon were the only relegated side, dropping to London 1.

== Structure ==
Each team played one match against each of the other teams, playing a total of ten matches each. The champions are promoted to National Division 3 and the bottom team was relegated to either London 1 or South West 1 depending on their locality.

== Participating teams and locations ==
Locations of the 1987–88 Area League South teams

Team	Ground	Capacity	City/Area
Askeans	Broad Walk	1,500 (300 seats)	Kidbrooke, London
Camborne	Recreation Ground	11,000	Camborne, Cornwall
Cheltenham	Prince of Wales	3,500 (500 seats)	Cheltenham, Gloucestershire
Havant	Hook's Lane	3,000 (200 seats)	Havant, Hampshire
Lydney	Regentsholme	3,000 (340 seats)	Lydney, Gloucestershire
Salisbury	Castle Road	1,500	Salisbury, Wiltshire
Sidcup	Crescent Farm		Sidcup, London
Southend	Warners Park	1,500 (150 seats)	Southend, Essex
Streatham-Croydon	Frant Road	2,000 (200 seats)	Thornton Heath, Croydon, London
Stroud	Fromehall Park	4,000 (200 seats)	Stroud, Gloucestershire
Sudbury	Moorsfield	1,000	Sudbury, Suffolk

== League table ==
1987–88 Area League South table
Pos	Team	Pld	W	D	L	PF	PA	PD	Pts	Qualification
1	Askeans (C)	10	8	1	1	141	83	+58	17	Promoted
2	Sidcup	10	7	2	1	130	58	+72	16	
3	Lydney	10	7	0	3	173	99	+74	14	
4	Camborne	10	5	2	3	113	119	−6	12	
5	Havant	10	5	0	5	116	102	+14	10	
6	Stroud	10	5	0	5	112	114	−2	10	
7	Southend	10	5	0	5	63	108	−45	10	
8	Sudbury	10	3	2	5	125	106	+19	8	
9	Salisbury	10	3	1	6	84	94	−10	7	
10	Cheltenham	10	3	0	7	95	152	−57	6	
11	Streatham-Croydon (R)	10	0	0	10	70	173	−103	0	Relegated

Rules for classification: Points are awarded as follows:
1. 2 pts for a win
2. 1 pt for a draw
3. 0 pts for a loss
If teams are level at any stage, difference between points for and against applies
(C) Champions; (R) Relegated

== Sponsorship ==
Area League South is part of the Courage Clubs Championship and was sponsored by Courage Brewery.

== See also ==
- 1987–88 National Division 1
- 1987–88 National Division 2
- 1987–88 National Division 3
- 1987–88 Area League North
