= 1988–89 National Division 1 =

Rugby union competition in England

- Countries: England
- Date: 10 September 1988 – 22 April 1989
- Champions: Bath (1st title)
- Runners-up: Gloucester
- Relegated: Liverpool St.Helens; Waterloo
- Matches played: 66
- Top point scorer: 103 – Rob Andrew (Wasps)
- Top try scorer: 10 – Jeremy Guscott (Bath)

The 1988–89 National Division 1 (sponsored by Courage Brewery) was the second season of the top tier of the English rugby union league system, the Courage Clubs Championship, currently known as Premiership Rugby. Leicester were the defending champions, and Liverpool St Helens and Rosslyn Park the promoted sides.

Bath became champions for the first time winning the league by a convincing margin from runners–up Gloucester. Waterloo and Liverpool St.Helens finished in the bottom two and were relegated to the 1989–90 National Division 2.

== Structure ==
Each team played one match against each of the other teams, playing a total of eleven matches each. This was the first season of fixed Saturdays for league matches, where before clubs had organised fixture dates and the number of home games were fairer (although some teams played six and others five). The bottom two sides were relegated to National Division 2.

The points system was changed so that a win counted for 2 points, a draw 1 point and a loss no points (previously this had been 4 points for a win, 2 for a draw and 1 for a loss).

== Participating teams ==
Locations of the 1988–89 Courage League National Division One teams

Team	Stadium	Capacity	City/Area	Previous season
Bath	Recreation Ground	8,300 (1,000 seats) (Note: The Courage Official League book gave the Recreation Ground a total capacity of 8,300 in their 1990–91 directory, despite Bath achieving a crowd of around 9,000 versus Bristol on 22 October 1988. It may be that additional temporary seating was provided for this game or that the crowd figure was inflated.)	Bath, Somerset	4th
Bristol	Memorial Stadium	8,500 (1,200 seats)	Bristol, Avon	9th
Gloucester	Kingsholm	11,100 (1,100 seats)	Gloucester, Gloucestershire	5th
Harlequins	The Stoop	9,000 (2,000 seats)	Twickenham, London	3rd
Leicester	Welford Road	14,700 (9,200 seats)	Leicester, Leicestershire	Champions
Liverpool St Helens	Moss Lane	4,370 (370 seats)	St Helens, Merseyside	Promoted from National 2 (2nd)
Moseley	The Reddings	9,999 (1,800 seats)	Birmingham, West Midlands	7th
Nottingham	Ireland Avenue	4,990 (590 seats)	Beeston, Nottinghamshire	8th
Orrell	Edge Hall Road	5,300 (300 seats)	Orrell, Greater Manchester	6th
Rosslyn Park	The Rock	4,630 (630 seats)	Roehampton, London	Promoted from National 2 (1st)
Wasps	Repton Avenue	3,200 (1,200 seats)	Sudbury, London	2nd
Waterloo	St Anthony's Road	9,950 (950 seats)	Blundellsands, Merseyside	10th

== Table ==
Pos	Team	Pld	W	D	L	PF	PA	PD	Pts	Qualification
1	Bath (C)	11	10	0	1	263	98	+165	20	Champions
2	Gloucester	11	7	1	3	215	112	+103	15	
3	Wasps	11	7	1	3	206	138	+68	15	
4	Nottingham	11	6	1	4	142	122	+20	13	
5	Orrell	11	6	1	4	148	157	−9	13	
6	Leicester	11	6	1	4	189	199	−10	13	
7	Bristol	11	6	0	5	188	117	+71	12	
8	Harlequins	11	5	0	6	194	184	+10	10	
9	Rosslyn Park	11	5	0	6	172	208	−36	10	
10	Moseley	11	3	0	8	113	242	−129	6	
11	Waterloo (R)	11	1	1	9	120	235	−115	3	Relegated
12	Liverpool St Helens (R)	11	1	0	10	116	254	−138	2	Relegated

Rules for classification: Points are awarded as follows:
1. 2 pts for a win
2. 1 pt for a draw
3. 0 pt for a loss
  (C) Champions; (R) Relegated

== Results table ==
The home team is listed on the left column.

Home \ Away	BAT	BRI	GLO	HAR	LEI	LIV	MOS	NOT	ORR	ROS	WAS	WAT
Bath Rugby		16–9	19–9					22–16	36–12		16–6	38–9
Bristol				18–6		50–14	18–0		15–6			14–3
Gloucester RFC		10–11			28–0		37–9	13–6			19–3	
Harlequins	9–26		26–11			15–6	38–15					23–24
Leicester	15–12	13–12		21–31					15–27	28–15	15–6	
Liverpool St Helens	7–21		9–31		12–23			15–22		12–32		
Moseley	0–38				22–13	18–15			10–12	7–13		13–6
Nottingham		10–6		12–0	12–12		13–9				9–15	
Orrell			6–16	16–15		20–4		12–6			9–9	15–12
Rosslyn Park	6–19	18–16	8–26	12–16				9–18	19–13			
Wasps		21–19		23–15		16–10	39–10			39–16		
Waterloo			15–15		22–34	6–12		9–18		14–24	0–29	

Legend: Blue = home team win; Yellow = draw; Red = away team win.

== Fixtures & Results ==
=== Round 1 ===
10 September 1988

Bristol	15 – 6	Orrell

Memorial Stadium

10 September 1988

Gloucester	37 – 9	Moseley

Kingsholm
Referee: Colin High

10 September 1988

Harlequins	9 – 26	Bath

The Stoop

10 September 1988

Leicester	15 – 6	Wasps

Welford Road

10 September 1988

Rosslyn Park	9 – 18	Nottingham

The Rock

10 September 1988

Waterloo	6 – 12	Liverpool St Helens

St Anthony's Road

=== Round 2 ===
24 September 1988

Bath	19 – 9	Gloucester

Recreation Ground
Attendance: 8,000
Referee: Steve Griffiths

24 September 1988

Liverpool St Helens	12 – 23	Leicester

Moss Lane

24 September 1988

Moseley	7 – 13	Rosslyn Park

The Reddings

24 September 1988

Nottingham	10 – 6	Bristol

Ireland Avenue

24 September 1988

Orrell	15 – 12	Waterloo

Edge Hall Road

24 September 1988

Wasps	23 – 15	Harlequins

Repton Avenue

=== Round 3 ===
8 October 1988

Bristol	18 – 0	Moseley

Memorial Stadium

8 October 1988

Gloucester	19 – 3	Wasps

Kingsholm
Referee: Daniel Salles

8 October 1988

Harlequins	15 – 6	Liverpool St Helens

The Stoop

8 October 1988

Leicester	15 – 27	Orrell

Welford Road

8 October 1988

Rosslyn Park	6 – 19	Bath

The Rock

8 October 1988

Waterloo	8 – 18	Nottingham

St Anthony's Road

=== Round 4 ===
22 October 1988

Bath	16 – 9	Bristol

Recreation Ground
Attendance: 9,000

22 October 1988

Liverpool St Helens	9 – 31	Gloucester

Moss Lane
Referee: Laurie Prideaux

22 October 1988

Moseley	13 – 6	Waterloo

The Reddings

22 October 1988

Nottingham	12 – 12	Leicester

Ireland Avenue

22 October 1988

Orrell	16 – 15	Harlequins

Edge Hall Road

22 October 1988

Wasps	39 – 16	Rosslyn Park

Repton Avenue

=== Round 5 ===
12 November 1988

Bristol	18 – 6	Harlequins

Memorial Stadium

12 November 1988

Moseley	0 – 38	Bath

The Reddings

12 November 1988

Nottingham	9 – 15	Wasps

Ireland Avenue

12 November 1988

Orrell	20 – 4	Liverpool St Helens

Edge Hall Road

12 November 1988

Rosslyn Park	8 – 26	Gloucester

The Rock
Referee: S V Trevithick

12 November 1988

Waterloo	22 – 34	Leicester

St Anthony's Road

=== Round 6 ===
19 November 1988

Bath	36 – 12	Orrell

Recreation Ground

19 November 1988

Gloucester	10 – 11	Bristol

Kingsholm
Referee: Steve Griffiths

19 November 1988

Harlequins	23 – 24	Waterloo

The Stoop

19 November 1988

Leicester	28 – 15	Rosslyn Park

Welford Road

19 November 1988

Liverpool St Helens	15 – 22	Nottingham

Moss Lane

19 November 1988

Wasps	39 – 10	Moseley

Repton Avenue

=== Round 7 ===
26 November 1988

Bath	16 – 6	Wasps

Recreation Ground

26 November 1988

Leicester	21 – 31	Harlequins

Welford Road

26 November 1988

Moseley	18 – 15	Liverpool St Helens

The Reddings

26 November 1988

Orrell	12 – 6	Nottingham

Edge Hall Road

26 November 1988

Rosslyn Park	18 – 16	Bristol

The Rock

26 November 1988

Waterloo	15 – 15	Gloucester

St Anthony's Road

=== Round 8 ===
14 January 1989

Bristol	14 – 3	Waterloo

Memorial Stadium

14 January 1989

Gloucester	28 – 0	Leicester

Kingsholm
Referee: Roger Quittenton

14 January 1989

Liverpool St Helens	7 – 21	Bath

Moss Lane
Referee: D Hudson

14 January 1989

Nottingham	13 – 9	Moseley

Ireland Avenue

14 January 1989

Orrell	9 – 9	Wasps

Edge Hall Road

14 January 1989

Rosslyn Park	12 – 16	Harlequins

The Rock

=== Round 9 ===
11 March 1989

Bath	22 – 16	Nottingham

Recreation Ground
Referee: D W Matthews

- Bath are champions.

11 March 1989

Harlequins	26 – 11	Gloucester

The Stoop
Referee: Fred Howard

11 March 1989

Leicester	13 – 12	Bristol

Welford Road

11 March 1989

Moseley	10 – 12	Orrell

The Reddings

11 March 1989

Wasps	16 – 10	Liverpool St Helens

Repton Avenue

11 March 1989

Waterloo	14 – 24	Rosslyn Park

St Anthony's Road

=== Round 10 ===
8 April 1989

Bath	38 – 9	Waterloo

Recreation Ground

- Waterloo are relegated.

8 April 1989

Liverpool St Helens	12 – 32	Rosslyn Park

Moss Lane

- Liverpool St Helens are relegated.

8 April 1989

Moseley	22 – 13	Leicester

The Reddings

8 April 1989

Nottingham	12 – 0	Harlequins

Ireland Avenue

8 April 1989

Orrell	6 – 16	Gloucester

Edge Hall Road
Referee: Tony Trigg

8 April 1989

Wasps	21 – 19	Bristol

Repton Avenue

=== Round 11 ===
22 April 1989

Bristol	50 – 14	Liverpool St Helens

Memorial Stadium

22 April 1989

Gloucester	13 – 6	Nottingham

Kingsholm
Referee: A L Mason

22 April 1989

Harlequins	38 – 15	Moseley

The Stoop

22 April 1989

Leicester	15 – 12	Bath

Welford Road

22 April 1989

Rosslyn Park	19 – 3	Orrell

The Rock

22 April 1989

Waterloo	0 – 29	Wasps

St Anthony's Road

== See also ==
- 1988–89 National Division 2
- 1988–89 National Division 3
- 1988–89 Area League North
- 1988–89 Area League South
