= 1989–90 National Division 3 =

Rugby union league

- Countries: England
- Date: 2 September 1989 – 30 April 1990
- Champions: London Scottish (1st title)
- Runners-up: Wakefield (also promoted)
- Relegated: London Welsh
- Matches played: 66
- Top point scorer: 102 – Andy Higgin (Vale of Lune)
- Top try scorer: 7 – Brendan Hanavan (Fylde); Mike Harrison (Wakefield)

The 1989–90 National Division 3 (sponsored by Courage Brewery) was the third season of the third tier of the English rugby union league system, the Courage Clubs Championship, currently known as National League 1. New teams to the division included London Scottish and London Welsh (relegated from tier 2) and Lydney and Roundhay who were promoted up from tier 4.

London Scottish won all their eleven matches and won promotion with three matches remaining, to return to the 1990–91 National Division 2 after one season away. Wakefield finished second and were also promoted. London Welsh finished in last place and was relegated to the 1990–91 Courage National 4 South in what was the club's second demotion in a row.

== Structure ==
Each team played one match against each of the other teams, playing a total of eleven matches each. The top two clubs were promoted to National Division 2 and only the bottom club was relegated to either National Division 4 North (formerly Area League North) or National Division 4 South (formerly Area League South) depending on locality, due to the expansion of the division from twelve to thirteen teams for the following season.

== Participating teams and locations ==
1989–90 National Division 3 teams in England

Team	Stadium	Capacity	City/Area	Previous season
Askeans	Broad Walk	1,500 (300 seats)	Kidbrooke, London	8th
Exeter	County Ground	5,750 (750 seats)	Exeter, Devon	9th
Fylde	Woodlands	7,500 (500 seats)	Lytham St Annes, Lancashire	10th
London Scottish	Athletic Ground	7,000	Richmond, London	Relegated from National 2 (11th)
London Welsh	Old Deer Park	4,500 (1,500 seats)	Richmond, London	Relegated from National 2 (12th)
Lydney	Regentsholm	3,000 (340 seats)	Lydney, Gloucestershire	Promoted from Area South (1st)
Nuneaton	Harry Cleaver Ground	5,000 (650 seats)	Nuneaton, Warwickshire	5th
Roundhay	Chandos Park	3,000	Roundhay, Leeds West Yorkshire	Promoted from Area North (1st)
Sheffield	Abbeydale Park	3,300 (100 seats) (Note: Although a 1990 club estimate was 1,100 (100 seated and 1,000 standing) this is very conservative as Abbeydale Park would experience 3,000+ crowds several times in later history in what was a relatively unchanged ground.)	Dore, Sheffield, South Yorkshire	6th
Vale of Lune	Powderhouse Lane	9,860 (360 seats)	Lancaster, Lancashire	7th
Wakefield	College Grove	4,000 (500 seats)	Wakefield, West Yorkshire	3rd
West Hartlepool	Brierton Lane	4,950 (450 seats)	Hartlepool, Cleveland	4th

== League table ==
1989–90 National Division 3 table
Pos	Team	Pld	W	D	L	PF	PA	PD	Pts	Qualification
1	London Scottish (C)	11	11	0	0	258	92	+166	22	Promoted
2	Wakefield	11	7	1	3	210	126	+84	15	Promoted
3	West Hartlepool	11	5	2	4	175	110	+65	12	
4	Sheffield	11	6	0	5	176	174	+2	12	
5	Askeans	11	6	0	5	170	235	−65	12	
6	Exeter	11	5	1	5	149	153	−4	11	
7	Roundhay	11	5	0	6	156	166	−10	10	
8	Fylde	11	5	0	6	169	222	−53	10	
9	Vale of Lune	11	4	0	7	154	219	−65	8	
10	Nuneaton	11	4	0	7	127	196	−69	8	
11	Lydney	11	3	0	8	153	166	−13	6	
12	London Welsh	11	3	0	8	141	179	−38	6	Relegated

Rules for classification: Points are awarded as follows:
1. 2 pts for a win
2. 1 pt for a draw
3. 0 pts for a loss

If teams are level at any stage, the following tiebreaker is applied:

1. Difference between points for and against
  (C) Champions

== See also ==
- 1989–90 National Division 1
- 1989–90 National Division 2
- 1989–90 Area League North
- 1989–90 Area League South
