= Durham City RFC =

English rugby union club

Durham City
- Full name: Durham City Rugby Football Club
- Union: Durham County Rugby Football Union
- Founded: 1872; 154 years ago
- Location: Durham, County Durham, England
- Ground: Hollow Drift (Capacity: 3,000 (500 seats))
- League: Regional 2 North
- 2024–25: 5th
Team kit

Official website
- www.pitchero.com/clubs/durhamcityrugbyfootballclub

Durham City Rugby Football Club is a rugby union club based in the city of Durham, County Durham, England. The men's first XV currently play in Regional 2 North, a sixth tier league in the English rugby union system. The women's first XV competes in NC2. The club runs a men's 2nd XV, which plays in Counties 3 Durham & Northumberland North, colts team and the full range of mini and junior sides.

== League history ==
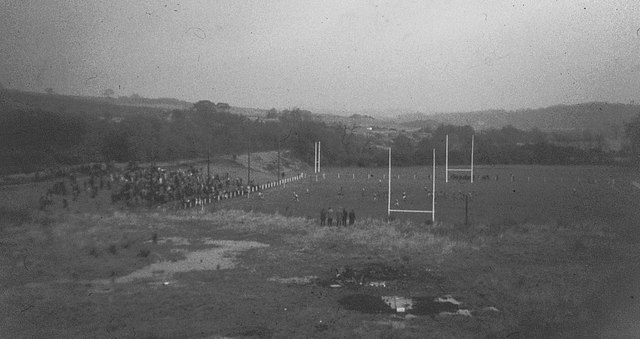
A rugby match at Hollow Drift in 1968

When league rugby was introduced in 1987, Durham City was allocated a place in the fourth tier, playing in Area 4 North, ending the first season as runner-up. The club stayed at that level until 1993 when a league restructure by the RFU saw the club placed in a new fifth tier – Courage League Division 5. However, the club was relegated from that league after just one season. The club has subsequently played in the regional leagues, fluctuating between North 1 East and Durham/Northumberland 1.

In 2026 a decision was taken to allow non first-XV teams to participate in the league structure and the men's XV was placed into Counties 3 Durham & Northumberland North.

== Honours ==
- Durham County RFU Senior Cup winners (20): 1885, 1888, 1910, 1921, 1929, 1932, 1933, 1934, 1936, 1953, 1957, 1958, 1962, 1963, 1964, 1965, 1966, 1967, 1988, 2024
- Durham/Northumberland 1 champions (2): 2015–16, 2018–19

== Ground ==
The club have played at Hollow Drift on Green Lane, Durham, since 1885.

In October 1905, the ground hosted The Original All Blacks' tour match against Durham County, the English county champions, with the All Blacks winning 16–3 in front of a crowd of 8,000, but Durham scoring the first try the New Zealanders had conceded on the tour.

The current stand was erected in 1950 as both a war memorial (the memorial plaque is now on the front of the club house) and a replacement for the previous grandstand that was in poor condition and had been damaged by a gale in 1942.

The ground is part of the Durham University estate (although the club house is not), and is also used by Durham University RFC. It was identified in the university's 2017–2027 masterplan as one of the sites 'for possible strategic investment'; as of 2022, the university had raised £500,000 towards a £1.5 million goal to redevelop the ground, including a new 500-seat stand and an artificial grass pitch.
