= PREM Rugby =

Top division of English men's rugby union

- Upcoming season or competition: 2026–27 Premiership Rugby
- Sport: Rugby union
- Founded: 1987; 39 years ago
- CEO: Simon Massie-Taylor
- Administrator: Rugby Football Union
- No. of teams: 10
- Country: England
- Most recent champion: Northampton Saints (3rd title) (2025–26)
- Most titles: Leicester Tigers (11 titles)
- Broadcasters: TNT Sports; ITV
- Level on pyramid: Level 1
- Relegation to: Champ Rugby (until 2025–26) (Note: Automatic promotion and relegation officially abolished from 2026–27, however as of February 2026, the last team to be relegated was London Irish in 2024. Saracens are the most recent team to be promoted which happened in 2021 after being relegated the year before.)
- Domestic cup: Premiership Rugby Cup
- International cups: European Rugby Champions Cup; European Rugby Challenge Cup
- Website: premiershiprugby.com

PREM Rugby, officially known as Gallagher PREM Rugby, or the "Gallagher PREM" for sponsorship reasons, formerly known as Premiership Rugby, is an English men's professional rugby union competition, consisting of 10 clubs, and is the top division of the English rugby union system. From 2000 to 2025, the competition title was "Premiership". Before then, it was known as "Premiership 1" and "National Division One".

Premiership clubs qualify for Europe's two main club competitions, the European Rugby Champions Cup and the European Rugby Challenge Cup. The competition is regarded as one of the three top-level professional leagues in the Northern and Western Hemispheres, along with the Top 14 in France, and the cross-border United Rugby Championship for teams from Scotland, Wales, Ireland, Italy and South Africa. Historically, the winner of the second division, the RFU Championship, was promoted to the Premiership, and the team finishing at the bottom of the Premiership each season was relegated to the Championship.

The competition has been played since 1987, and has evolved into the current Premiership system. The current champions are Northampton Saints, who won the league in 2026.

== History ==
=== Beginnings: English domestic rugby union until 1972 ===
The governing body of rugby union in England, the Rugby Football Union (RFU), long resisted leagues as it was believed that the introduction of leagues would increase 'dirty' play and put pressure on clubs to pay their players (thereby contravening the amateur ethos). Instead, clubs arranged their own fixtures and had traditional games. The only organised tournaments were the County Cups and County Championship – the former played by clubs and the latter by County representative teams e.g.1980- 81 Rugby Union County Championship. The Daily Telegraph and a few local newspapers – such as the Yorkshire Post – compiled 'pennants' based on teams' performances, but as the strength of fixture lists varied, it was at best an estimate of a team's performance throughout a season.

=== 1972–1995: Leagues and cups ===
In 1972 the RFU sanctioned a national knock-out cup – the RFU Club Competition, the predecessor to the Anglo-Welsh Cup – followed first by regional merit tables and then, in the mid-1980s, by national merit tables. One of the casualties of the move to competitive leagues was the loss of some traditional games as the new fixture lists didn't allow time for all of them.

The league system has evolved since its start in 1987 when the Courage Leagues were formed – a league pyramid with roughly 1,000 clubs playing in 108 leagues, each with promotion and relegation.

In the first season, clubs were expected to arrange the fixtures on mutually convenient dates. The clubs involved were Bath, Bristol, Coventry, Gloucester, Harlequins, Leicester, Moseley, Nottingham, Orrell, Sale, Wasps and Waterloo. That first season was an unqualified success, with clubs in the upper echelons of the national leagues reporting increased crowds, interest from both local backers and national companies, and higher skill levels among players exposed to regular competition. The fears that leagues would lead to greater violence on the field proved largely unfounded.

By the next season, the RFU allocated fixed Saturdays to the league season, removing the clubs' responsibility for scheduling matches. There was no home and away structure to the leagues in those early seasons, as sides played one another only once.

Initially two teams, Bath and Leicester, proved to be head and shoulders above the rest in the Courage League, and between them dominated the top of the table.

In 1994, the league structure expanded to include a full rota of home and away matches for the first time. The 1994–95 season was the first to be shown live on Sky Sports, a relationship which continued until the 2013–14 season when BT Sport acquired the exclusive rights in a deal which is currently scheduled to end after the 2023–24 season.

=== 1996: The dawn of professional rugby union ===
The league turned professional for the 1996–97 season when the first winners were Wasps, joining Bath and Leicester as the only champions in the league's first decade. Clubs like Saracens, Newcastle and Northampton were able to attract wealthy benefactors, but the professional era also had its casualties, as clubs like West Hartlepool, Richmond and London Scottish were forced into administration when their backers pulled out.

=== 2000–2002: Premiership, Championship and playoffs ===
The start of the 2000–01 season brought with it a re-vamping of the season structure. In 2000–2001 an 8-team playoff (the Championship) was introduced. However, the team finishing top of the table at the end of the regular season was still considered English champions ("Premiership title").

Halfway through the 2001–02 season, with Leicester odds-on to win their fourth title in succession, it was controversially decided that the winners of the 8-team playoff would be crowned English champions. There was an outcry from fans and this proposal was dropped.

=== 2003–2014: The ascendancy of the playoffs ===
From the beginning of the 2002–03 season, a new playoff format was introduced to replace the 8-team Championship. The format required the first-placed team in the league to play the winner of a match between the second- and third-placed teams. Critically, the winner of this game (the Premiership Final) would be recognised as English champions. Although Gloucester won the league by a clear margin, they then faced a three-week wait until the final. Having lost their momentum, they were beaten by second-placed Wasps (who had defeated third-placed Northampton) in the play-offs. The playoff structure was reformatted in the 2005–06 season in which the first-placed team would play the fourth placed team in a semi-final (a Shaughnessy playoff).

Since the implementation of the playoff system, seven teams have won both the regular season and playoffs in the same year, a feat which has been achieved on ten occasions: Leicester three times in 2008–09, 2009–10 and 2021–22 (as well as 2000–01, the first year of playoffs when the Champion was still determined by league position), Sale Sharks in 2005–06, Harlequins in 2011–12, Saracens in 2015–16 and 2022–23, Exeter Chiefs in 2019–20, Northampton Saints in 2023–24 and Bath in 2024–25.

Of all the Premiership teams, Wasps made a reputation for playing the competition format to perfection, peaking at the right time to be crowned English Champions in 2003, 2004, 2005 and 2008. Wasps did not lead the league standings at the end of the season in any of these years. Conversely, Gloucester have garnered an unfortunate reputation for leading the table at the end of the regular season, only to fall short of winning the Premiership title, losing finals in 2003, 2007, and 2008. Gloucester's single victory in the playoffs, in 2002, occurred when league leaders Leicester were still considered English champions, meaning Gloucester's Championship victory was considered secondary.

The 2011–12 season saw Harlequins add their name to the trophy, winning 30–23 against the nine-times champions Leicester. Leicester would have to wait until 2012–13 for their 10th championship, where they defeated Northampton in the final.

The 2013–14 Aviva Premiership season saw Northampton become the 8th different team to win the trophy. This was achieved when they defeated Leicester Tigers in the semi-final 21–20, thus denying Leicester a 10th Consecutive Final. In the final, they defeated Saracens 24–20 with a try in the last minute of extra time to win the 2013–14 Aviva Premiership.

=== 2014–2018: US initiatives ===
With the future of the Heineken Cup uncertain beyond 2013–14, due to a row between England's Premiership Rugby Limited and France's LNR on one side and the sport's governing bodies on the other, Premiership Rugby Limited explored several moves toward expanding its brand into the United States. In May 2013, Premiership Rugby Limited and U.S.-based RugbyLaw entered into a plan by which the two organisations were to help back a proposed U.S. professional league that could have begun play as early as 2014. The first phase of the plan was to involve two preseason exhibitions featuring an "American Barbarians" side that would combine international veterans and young American talent. The "Barbarians" were intended to play matches in August 2013 in the U.S. and London, but those plans fell through, and the matches were indefinitely delayed.

In August 2013, Peter Tom, the chairman of Leicester Tigers, confirmed that discussions had taken place within Premiership Rugby Limited about the possibility of hosting selected Premiership matches in the US. The first match played in the USA was on 12 March 2016 when London Irish were defeated by Saracens at the Red Bull Arena in the New York Metropolitan Area. This match was intended to be the first of a three-year deal which would have seen London Irish play one home match each season in the US, but their relegation from the Premiership at the end of the 2015–16 season scuttled that plan. A new deal was reached with American sports marketing company AEG in 2017 which was intended to see at least one Premiership match taken to the US for four seasons starting in 2017–18. The first match under the new deal was held on 16 September 2017, with Newcastle Falcons taking their home fixture against Saracens to the Talen Energy Stadium in the Philadelphia suburb of Chester, Pennsylvania. In 2018–19, although no match was scheduled to take place in the US, the round 6 match between Saracens and Harlequins was the first broadcast on network television in the US of a Premiership Rugby game. The game was shown live on NBC. In 2019–20, and 2020–21 once again no matches were scheduled to take place in the US.

2018 also saw a revamp of the league's secondary competition with the launch of the Premiership Rugby Shield.

=== 2018–19: CVC Capital Partners investment ===
In December 2018, it was announced that the Luxembourg based investment advisory firm CVC Capital Partners had bought a 27% stake in Premiership Rugby in a deal worth £200m. A previous offer to purchase a 51% majority share was rejected. The money from the investment was planned to be used to improve facilities at clubs and grow the game globally. In April 2026, Exeter Chiefs CEO, Tony Rowe, criticised the deal believing it was a mistake for the stake to be sold to CVC.

=== 2019–20: Salary cap investigation into Saracens ===
In March 2019, allegations emerged that Saracens may have broken the league's salary cap. In June, Premiership Rugby announced that they would investigate the allegations. In November 2019, Saracens were found to have been in breach of the salary cap regulations due to failure to disclose player payments in the 2016–17, 2017–18 and 2018–19 seasons, which would have taken them over the senior player cap. They were handed a 35-point deduction for the 2019–20 season and fined £5.3 million. The judgement found that Saracens had been reckless in entering into the arrangements with players without disclosing them to Premiership Rugby.

On 18 January 2020, Premiership Rugby announced that Saracens would be relegated to the RFU Championship for the 2020–21 season. Premiership Rugby CEO Darren Childs said this punishment was due to Saracens lack of cooperation in a mid-season audit to prove compliance in the 2019–20 season.

On 23 January 2020, Lord Dyson's full report into Saracens' spending was published, it revealed that Saracens had overspent the salary cap by £1.1m in 2016–17, £98,000 in 2017-18 and £906,000 in 2018–19. These included £923,947.63 of property investments between Nigel Wray and three unnamed Saracens players. It also included Saracens claim that the Salary Cap was unenforceable under competition law, this defence was rejected. On 28 January 2020, Premiership Rugby applied a further 70 point deduction for the 2019–20 season to ensure Saracens would finish bottom of the league table.

=== 2020–2025: COVID-19, clubs going bust and six winners in six years ===
Logo until 2025

The COVID-19 pandemic disrupted all elite sports in England in spring 2020. The RFU initially suspended both the Premiership and Championship before eventually cancelling the Championship season. Newcastle Falcons, who topped the Championship table at the time of the season's premature end were promoted based on their playing record and would replace Saracens in the Premiership the following season.

The 2019–20 Premiership Rugby season recommenced on 14 August and the final was held 24 October 2020.

The disruption of the 2019–20 season meant the 2020–21 season commenced 10 weeks late on 20 November 2020 and ran over a reduced timeframe of 32 weeks (down from 42).

The financial impact of the pandemic also caused the salary cap to be temporarily reduced for a maximum of 3 seasons from the 2021–22 season.

A moratorium on relegation was also approved in February 2021, meaning no teams would be relegated as a potential consequence of another team receiving more points due to games cancelled because of COVID-19. With this news it was also confirmed that the league's minimum standards criteria for promotion would be reviewed as would league structure from the 2021–22 season. The new structure extended the moratorium on relegation for a further two-years. A playoff between the top team in the Championship and the bottom team in the Premiership is also introduced in the 2023–24 season.

On 26 September 2022, Worcester Warriors went into administration and were suspended from the league. Their upcoming fixture against Gloucester on 1 October, was also cancelled. On 6 October, Worcester Warriors were suspended for the rest of the season, relegated from the premiership, and all past and future fixtures for that season expunged.

On 17 October 2022, Wasps went into administration and were suspended from the league. Their upcoming fixture against Sale Sharks on 18 October, was also cancelled. On 28 October, Wasps were suspended for the rest of the season, relegated from the premiership, and all past and future fixtures for that season expunged.

On 6 June 2023, London Irish were suspended from the Premiership after missing a deadline to pay players and staff. Irish subsequently went into administration on 7 June.

Despite ongoing financial concerns the league remained very competitive during these years. Northampton Saints defeated Bath in the 2023–24 final. This meant the league had produced five different winners of the competition in five years stretching back to the 2019-20 season with Exeter Chiefs, Harlequins, Leicester Tigers, Saracens and Northampton Saints all winning the competition.

In June 2025, Bath returned to the Premiership final for a second consecutive year defeating Leicester Tigers 23–21 to secure their first title in 29 years and to make it six different winners of the tournament in as many seasons. Despite financial concerns arising for last place Newcastle Falcons, no team was promoted or relegated from the league this season.

=== 2025–Present: PREM Rugby era and expansion model ===
In July 2025, following the conclusion of the 2024–25 season, the league officially re-branded from Premiership Rugby to PREM Rugby with the aim of moving away from a corporate image and attracting younger fans. The announcement came alongside the news that the opening fixture of the 2025–26 season between Gloucester and Sale Sharks will take place on a Thursday night, a first for the league. The change was made as there will be no Saturday match, to avoid a clash with the 2025 Women's Rugby World Cup third-place play-off and final held at Twickenham on 27 September. In August 2025, Newcastle Falcons were renamed Newcastle Red Bulls following a takeover by Austrian energy drink company Red Bull.

On 27 February 2026, the RFU Council voted to approve the abolition of automatic promotion and relegation between the PREM and Champ Rugby, replacing it with a criteria-based expansion model. The change takes effect from the 2026–27 season.

Under the new structure, the league will remain at 10 clubs for a minimum of three seasons. An expansion to 12 teams is planned for the 2029–30 season, with potential for further growth after. Any club seeking admission to an expanded PREM must first have played at least one season in Champ Rugby and also require purchase of a P share in the league, valued at approximately £12 million. All PREM clubs will also be required to either operate or support a team in Premiership Women's Rugby or fund a regional women's development plan; clubs that fail to comply face financial penalties. At one stage, it had been suggested that at least one Welsh team could join the league but this later played down by the RFU.

== Clubs ==
=== Current clubs ===
The Premiership began the 2022–23 season with 13 clubs, however both Worcester Warriors and Wasps were removed from the league and automatically relegated after going into administration. Additionally, ahead of the following 2023–24 season, London Irish were also removed from the league and automatically relegated as a result of financial insolvency. None of these teams were subsequently replaced by promotions from the RFU Championship, thus leaving a division of 10 teams.

Locations of current Gallagher Premiership Rugby Teams

Club	Established	City	Stadium	Capacity	Titles (Last)
Bath	1865	Bath	The Recreation Ground	14,509	7 (2025)
Bristol Bears	1888	Bristol	Ashton Gate	27,000	– (N/A)
Exeter Chiefs	1871	Exeter	Sandy Park	16,000	2 (2020)
Gloucester	1873	Gloucester	Kingsholm	16,200	– (N/A)
Harlequins	1866	London (Twickenham)	Twickenham Stoop	14,800	2 (2021)
Leicester Tigers	1880	Leicester	Welford Road	26,000	11 (2022)
Newcastle Red Bulls	1877	Newcastle upon Tyne	Kingston Park	11,000	1 (1998)
Northampton Saints	1880	Northampton	Franklin's Gardens	15,249	3 (2026)
Sale Sharks	1861	Manchester (Salford)	Salford Community Stadium	12,000	1 (2006)
Saracens	1876	London (Hendon)	StoneX Stadium	10,500	6 (2023)

Note: Capacity listed for rugby union games may differ from official stadium capacity

=== All time ===
A total of 28 clubs have been involved in the top-flight since the league's inception in the 1987–88 season. The most recent club to make its debut in the Premiership was London Welsh, which made their top flight debut in 2012–13.

Three clubs — Bath, Gloucester and Leicester Tigers — have appeared in every season to date. Harlequins have only missed the 2005–06 season due to relegation. Seven other clubs have appeared in at least 25 seasons — Bristol Bears, London Irish, Newcastle Red Bulls, Northampton Saints, Sale Sharks, Saracens and Wasps. The financial insolvency, expulsion and automatic relegation of Worcester Warriors and Wasps in September and October 2022 respectively, means that both of their records are considered to have ended at the close of the 2021–22 season. London Irish completed the 2022–23 season before entering into insolvency in the off-season.

Coventry, Liverpool St Helens, Moseley, Nottingham, Rosslyn Park, Rugby and Waterloo only appeared during the amateur era, whereas Exeter Chiefs, Leeds Tykes, London Welsh, Richmond, Rotherham Titans and Worcester Warriors have only appeared during the professional era.

Below, the 2026–27 clubs are listed in bold and ever-present clubs are listed in bold italics. Years listed are only the calendar years in which the seasons started. Data is inclusive of the 2026/27 season.

Seasons	Team	Season Starting Years
**40**	**Bath**	1987–
3	Bedford Blues	1990, 1999, 2000
**29**	**Bristol Bears**	1987–1997, 1999–2002, 2005–2008, 2016, 2018–
1	Coventry	1987
**17**	**Exeter Chiefs**	2010–
**40**	**Gloucester**	1987–
**39**	**Harlequins**	1987–2004, 2006–
8	Leeds Tykes	2002–2006, 2008, 2010, 2011
**40**	**Leicester Tigers**	1987–
2	Liverpool St Helens	1989, 1991
28	London Irish	1991–1993, 1996–2015, 2017, 2019–2022
2	London Scottish	1993, 1999
2	London Welsh	2012, 2014
4	Moseley	1987–1990
**29**	**Newcastle Red Bulls**	1993, 1997–2011, 2013–2018, 2020–
**35**	**Northampton Saints**	1990–1994, 1996–2006, 2008–
5	Nottingham	1987–1991
10	Orrell	1987–1996
2	Richmond	1997, 1998
4	Rosslyn Park	1988–1991
2	Rotherham Titans	2001, 2004
2	Rugby Lions	1992, 1993
**34**	**Sale Sharks**	1987, 1994–
**35**	**Saracens**	1989–1992, 1995–2019, 2021–
35	Wasps	1987–2021
2	Waterloo	1987, 1988
5	West Hartlepool	1992, 1994–1996, 1998
16	Worcester Warriors	2004–2009, 2011–2013, 2015–2021

== Sponsorship ==
Period	Sponsor	Name	League Title
1987–1997	(United Kingdom) Courage Brewery	Courage League National Division One	National Division One
1997–2000	(United Kingdom) Allied Dunbar	Allied Dunbar Premiership	Premiership 1
2000–2005	(Switzerland) Zurich Insurance Group	Zurich Premiership	Premiership
2005–2010	(Republic of Ireland) Guinness Brewery	Guinness Premiership	Premiership
2010–2018	(United Kingdom) Aviva	Aviva Premiership	Premiership
2018–2025	(United States) Arthur J. Gallagher & Co.	Gallagher Premiership	Premiership
2025–current	(United States) Arthur J. Gallagher & Co.	Gallagher PREM	PREM

== Structure ==
=== Referees ===
Referees in the PREM are selected from the RFU's Professional Referee Unit. The Professional Referee Unit consists of 15 referees with match appointments decided by PRU management team of ex-international referees Ed Morrison, Brian Campsall and Tony Spreadbury.

List of PREM Referees

- Wayne Barnes
- Matthew Carley
- Sara Cox
- Karl Dickson
- Tom Foley
- Simon Harding
- Andrew Jackson
- Greg MacDonald
- Craig Maxwell-Keys
- John Meredith
- Luke Pearce
- Dean Richards
- Christophe Ridley
- Ian Tempest
- Tim Wigglesworth

They are supported by a large team of assistant referees.

=== League season ===
The PREM Rugby league season typically runs from September to June and comprises 18 rounds of matches, with each club playing each other home and away. The results of the matches contribute points to the league as follows:

- 4 points are awarded for a win
- 2 points are awarded for a draw
- 0 points are awarded for a loss, however
  - 1 losing (bonus) point is awarded to a team that loses a match by 7 points or fewer
  - 1 additional (bonus) point is awarded to a team scoring 4 tries or more in a match

Since the restart of the 2019–20 season, scheduled fixtures which are cancelled because of a COVID-19 outbreak in one of the competing teams will have their outcome and points allocation decided by a PREM Rugby panel. As of the start of the 2021–22 season, if the fixture cannot be rescheduled, it is recorded as a 0–0 draw. In this situation, if one team would have been able to fulfil the fixture, they will be awarded 4 points, while the team unable to field a matchday squad due to a COVID-19 outbreak will be given 2 points – otherwise, if both teams are impacted by COVID-19, they will each receive 2 points for the affected fixture.

=== Play-offs ===
Following the completion of the regular season, the top 4 teams enter the play-offs, which are held in June. The top two teams receive home advantage, the league leaders hosting the 4th ranked team, and the 2nd place team hosting the 3rd place team. The winners of these semi-finals progress to the final, held at Twickenham Stadium, with the winner of the final being crowned champions.

=== Promotion and relegation ===
Admittance to the Premiership, was historically achieved through a system of promotion and relegation between the Premiership and the RFU Championship. Originally, the season-winning Championship club was promoted to replace the lowest-placed Premiership club.

On 27 February 2026, the RFU Council voted overwhelmingly to abolish automatic promotion and relegation with effect from the 2026–27 season. The league will instead expand via a criteria-based process overseen by an Expansion Review Group, with a target of 12 clubs by the 2029–30 season. Champ Rugby will continue to serve as a pathway to the PREM, with any club seeking admission to an expanded PREM required to have played at least one season there. Saracens were the last club to be relegated from and subsequently promoted to the PREM under the traditional system.

Relegation change and new regulations

As a result of the COVID-19 pandemic, a moratorium was approved in February 2021 for a halt on top-flight clubs being relegated from the Premiership beginning that season. As promotion from the Championship would not be stopped, this meant the Premiership would expand to 13 teams in the following year.

The moratorium was extended by an additional two seasons in June 2021. New regulations would also include a moratorium on promotion from the Championship in the same season had the Premiership expanded to 14 teams and introduce a play-off between the bottom placed Premiership Club and top placed Championship club in 2023–24. New minimum standards criteria were announced in September 2022, confirming that promotion from the championship was still due to take place in 2023.

The Premiership could have expanded again to 14 teams from the 2023–23 season but the league returned to 12 teams on 6 October 2022 when Worcester Warriors were expelled from the league for the season after entering administration due to financial problems. Despite trying to find a buyer, the club was wound up in February 2023. On 17 October 2022, Wasps became the second Premiership club to enter administration that season. The club was also automatically relegated from the Premiership, with their remaining games cancelled and all results expunged. London Irish finished the season but were suspended for the following season during the off season meaning the Premiership contracted to just ten teams from the 2023–24 season.

=== European competition qualification ===
The top seven teams qualify for the following season's European Rugby Champions Cup. The eighth champions cup place is awarded to either the winner of the Challenge Cup or the team placed eighth. Teams placed 8, 9 and 10th that do not qualify for the Champions Cup play in the Challenge Cup.

== Champions ==
Between 1987 and 2002, the team at the top of the league was crowned English champions. Since 2002–03, the winner of the league has been determined by a Premiership Final, which takes place at Twickenham and consists of two rounds of knock-out play amongst the top four teams.

This change was originally considered controversial, particularly when Wasps won four of the first six play-off finals without ever topping the regular season table, with Sale the only team to both top the table and win the Premiership final in that period.

As of the end of the 2024–25 season, 10 table-topping teams have won the Premiership in 23 seasons, including five of the last six. These teams’ names are italicised under the "Top of Table" column below.

In most seasons, at least one team has been relegated at the end of the season, although in 1995–96, there was no relegation to allow division expansion, and in 2001–02, Leeds were given a reprieve because the Division One champions did not have a suitable ground to allow promotion. Relegation was also suspended between 2020–21 and 2022–23 to allow further expansion – although Worcester and Wasps were both relegated for going into administration during the 2022–23 season, as was London Irish ahead of the 2023–24 season.

Key
†	Match was won during extra time

#	Season	Champions	Final	Runners-up	Top of Table	Relegated
1	1987–88	Leicester	N/A	Wasps	Leicester	Sale, Coventry
2	1988–89	Bath	N/A	Gloucester	Bath	Liverpool St Helens, Waterloo
3	1989–90	Wasps	N/A	Gloucester	Wasps	Bedford
4	1990–91	Bath	N/A	Wasps	Bath	Liverpool St Helens, Moseley
5	1991–92	Bath	N/A	Orrell	Bath	Rosslyn Park, Nottingham
6	1992–93	Bath	N/A	Wasps	Bath	Rugby Lions, West Hartlepool, Saracens, London Scottish
7	1993–94	Bath	N/A	Leicester	Bath	Newcastle, London Irish
8	1994–95	Leicester	N/A	Bath	Leicester	Northampton
9	1995–96	Bath	N/A	Leicester	Bath	No relegation
10	1996–97	Wasps	N/A	Bath	Wasps	Orrell, West Hartlepool
11	1997–98	Newcastle	N/A	Saracens	Newcastle	Bristol
12	1998–99	Leicester	N/A	Northampton	Leicester	West Hartlepool
13	1999–00	Leicester	N/A	Bath	Leicester	Bedford
14	2000–01	Leicester	N/A	Wasps	Leicester	Rotherham
15	2001–02	Leicester	N/A	Sale	Leicester	No relegation
16	2002–03	Wasps	39 – 3	Gloucester	Gloucester	Bristol
17	2003–04	Wasps	10 – 6	Bath	Bath	Rotherham
18	2004–05	Wasps	39 – 14	Leicester	Leicester	Harlequins
19	2005–06	Sale	45 – 20	Leicester	Sale	Leeds
20	2006–07	Leicester	44 – 16	Gloucester	Gloucester	Northampton
21	2007–08	Wasps	26 – 16	Leicester	Gloucester	Leeds
22	2008–09	Leicester	10 – 9	London Irish	Leicester	Bristol
23	2009–10	Leicester	33 – 27	Saracens	Leicester	Worcester
24	2010–11	Saracens	22 – 18	Leicester	Leicester	Leeds
25	2011–12	Harlequins	30 – 23	Leicester	Harlequins	Newcastle
26	2012–13	Leicester	37 – 17	Northampton	Saracens	London Welsh
27	2013–14	Northampton	24 – 20†	Saracens	Saracens	Worcester
28	2014–15	Saracens	28 – 16	Bath	Northampton	London Welsh
29	2015–16	Saracens	28 – 20	Exeter	Saracens	London Irish
30	2016–17	Exeter	23 – 20†	Wasps	Wasps	Bristol
31	2017–18	Saracens	27 – 10	Exeter	Exeter	London Irish
32	2018–19	Saracens	37 – 34	Exeter	Exeter	Newcastle
33	2019–20	Exeter	19 – 13	Wasps	Exeter	Saracens
34	2020–21	Harlequins	40 – 38	Exeter	Bristol	No relegation
35	2021–22	Leicester	15 – 12	Saracens	Leicester	No relegation
36	2022–23	Saracens	35 – 25	Sale	Saracens	Worcester, Wasps, (Note: Worcester and Wasps were each relegated partway through the 2022–23 season as a consequence of entering administration.) London Irish (Note: London Irish were relegated after the end of the 2022–23 season also due to entering administration.)
37	2023–24	Northampton	25 – 21	Bath	Northampton	No relegation
38	2024–25	Bath	23 – 21	Leicester	Bath	No relegation
39	2025–26	Northampton	26 – 17	Exeter	Northampton	No relegation (Note: Last season under promotion/relegation system)
40	2026–27	TBD	TBD	TBD	TBD	Relegation suspended

=== Summary of winners ===
#	Team	Champions	Years as champions	Runners-up	Years as runners-up	Top of league table
1	Leicester Tigers	11	1987–88, 1994–95, 1998–99, 1999–00, 2000–01, 2001–02, 2006–07, 2008–09, 2009–10, 2012–13, 2021–22	8	1993–94, 1995–96, 2004–05, 2005–06, 2007–08, 2010–11, 2011–12, 2024–25	11
2	Bath	7	1988–89, 1990–91, 1991–92, 1992–93, 1993–94, 1995–96, 2024–25	6	1994–95, 1996–97, 1999–00, 2003–04, 2014–15, 2023–24	8
3	Wasps	6	1989–90, 1996–97, 2002–03, 2003–04, 2004–05, 2007–08	6	1987–88, 1990–91, 1992–93, 2000–01, 2016–17, 2019–20	3
3	Saracens	6	2010–11, 2014–15, 2015–16, 2017–18, 2018–19, 2022–23	4	1997–98, 2009–10, 2013–14, 2021–22	4
5	Northampton Saints	3	2013–14, 2023–24, 2025–26	2	1998–99, 2012–13	3
6	Exeter Chiefs	2	2016–17, 2019–20	5	2015–16, 2017–18, 2018–19, 2020–21, 2025–26	3
6	Harlequins	2	2011–12, 2020–21	—	N/A	1
8	Sale Sharks	1	2005–06	2	2001–02, 2022–23	1
8	Newcastle Red Bulls	1	1997–98	—	N/A	1
10	Gloucester	—	N/A	4	1988–89, 1989–90, 2002–03, 2006–07	3
10	London Irish	—	N/A	1	2008–09	—
10	Orrell	—	N/A	1	1991–92	—
10	Bristol	—	N/A	—	N/A	1

== Player records ==
All records relate to the 1997–98 season onward when National League One was re-launched as the Premiership.

As of 21 September 2026. Bold italics denote players active in the 2026–27 Premiership.

=== Appearances ===
Rank	Nationality	Player	Club(s)	Years	Apps
1	England	Richard Wigglesworth	Sale, Saracens, Leicester	2002–2022	322
2	England	Danny Care	Leeds, Harlequins	2005–2025	294
3	England	Alex Goode	Saracens	2008–2025	282
4	England	Mike Brown	Harlequins, Newcastle, Leicester	2005–2025	281
5	England	Alex Waller	Northampton	2009–2024	273
6	England	Steve Borthwick	Bath, Saracens	1998–2014	265
7	England	George Chuter	Saracens, Leicester	1997–2014	262
7	England	Phil Dowson	Newcastle, Northampton, Worcester	2001–2017	262
9	England	Charlie Hodgson	Sale, Saracens	2000–2016	254
9	England	Dan Cole	Leicester	2008–2025	254

=== Points ===
Rank	Nationality	Player	Club(s)	Years	Points
1	England	Charlie Hodgson	Sale, Saracens	2000–2016	2,625
2	England	Andy Goode	Leicester, Saracens, Worcester, Wasps, Newcastle	1998–2016	2,285
3	England	George Ford	Leicester, Bath, Sale	2009–	2,065
4	England	Owen Farrell	Saracens	2009–	1,860
5	England	Stephen Myler	Northampton, London Irish	2006–2020	1,778
6	New Zealand	Jimmy Gopperth	Newcastle, Wasps, Leicester	2009–2023	1,737
7	New Zealand	Nick Evans	Harlequins	2008–2017	1,656
8	Ireland	Gareth Steenson	Exeter	2010–2020	1,651
9	England	Olly Barkley	Bath, Gloucester, London Welsh	2001–2015	1,605
10	England	Freddie Burns	Gloucester, Leicester, Bath	2008–2023	1,532

=== Tries ===
Rank	Nationality	Player	Club(s)	Years	Tries
1	England	Chris Ashton	Northampton, Saracens, Sale, Harlequins, Worcester, Leicester	2008–2023	101
2	England	Christian Wade	Wasps, Gloucester, Newcastle	2011–	100
3	England	Tom Varndell	Leicester, Wasps, Bristol	2004–2017	92
4	England	Mark Cueto	Sale	2001–2015	90
5	England	Danny Care	Leeds, Harlequins	2005–2025	85
6	England	Jonny May	Gloucester, Leicester	2010–2024	78
7	England	Steve Hanley	Sale	1998–2007	75
8	England	Mike Brown	Harlequins, Newcastle, Leicester	2005–2025	72
9	England	Matt Banahan	Bath, Gloucester	2007–2021	71
10	England	Paul Sackey	Bedford, London Irish, Wasps, Harlequins	1999–2014	69

== Awards ==
In addition to the winner's trophy and the individual winner's medals awarded to players who win the title, the Premiership also issues other awards throughout the season.

A man-of-the-match award is awarded to the player who has the greatest impact in an individual match.

A monthly award is given for the Player of the Month. Additionally, there are annual awards for Player of the Season, Young Player of the Season, Team of the Season, Director of Rugby of the Season and Community Player of the Season.

== Coaches ==
=== Current coaches ===
The following table outlines the current senior coaches at each PREM club, as of the 2026–27 PREM season:

Note: The designation of the senior coaching staff member as either Director of Rugby or Head Coach, and the responsibilities they hold, varies between individual clubs.

Coach	Nationality	Club	Appointed	Time in role	Titles won	Ref
Rob Baxter	England	Exeter Chiefs	7 May 2009	17 years, 195 days	2	
Pat Lam	Samoa	Bristol Bears	1 June 2017	9 years, 170 days	0	
George Skivington	England	Gloucester	3 July 2020	6 years, 138 days	0	
Alex Sanderson	England	Sale Sharks	15 January 2021	5 years, 307 days	0	
Phil Dowson	England	Northampton Saints	1 June 2022	4 years, 170 days	2	
Johann van Graan	South Africa	Bath	11 July 2022	4 years, 130 days	1	
Geoff Parling	England	Leicester Tigers	3 August 2025	1 year, 107 days	0	
Jason Gilmore	Australia	Harlequins	18 September 2025	1 year, 61 days	0	
Alan Dickens	England	Newcastle Red Bulls	1 October 2025	1 year, 48 days	0	
Brendan Venter	South Africa	Saracens	25 September 2026	20 days	0	

== Hall of Fame ==
The following former players and officials have been inducted into the Premiership Rugby Hall of Fame since 2013:

Note: Between 1997 and 2012, the winners of the Premiership Player of the Season and Director of Rugby of the Season awards (as detailed above) were also included in the Hall of Fame.

Year	Nationality	Inductee	Position	Club(s)
2013	England	George Chuter	Player	Saracens, Leicester
2013	England	Charlie Hodgson	Player	Sale, Saracens
2013	Ireland	Geordan Murphy	Player/Coach	Leicester
2014	England	Martin Johnson	Player	Leicester
2014	England	Lewis Moody	Player	Leicester, Bath
2014	England	Ed Morrison	Referee	Not applicable
2014	Scotland	Tom Walkinshaw	Owner	Gloucester
2015	England	Lawrence Dallaglio	Player	Wasps
2015	England	Josh Lewsey	Player	Bristol, Wasps
2015	England	Simon Shaw	Player	Bristol, Wasps
2015	England	James Simpson-Daniel	Player	Gloucester
2015	England	Phil Vickery	Player	Gloucester, Wasps
2015	England	Peter Wheeler	Chief Executive	Leicester
2015	England	Jonny Wilkinson	Player	Newcastle
2016	England	Neil Back	Player	Leicester
2016	England	Mark Cueto	Player	Sale
2016	England	Richard Hill	Player/Coach	Saracens
2016	England	Mike Tindall	Player	Bath, Gloucester
2016	England	Hugh Vyvyan	Player	Newcastle, Saracens
2017	England	Steve Borthwick	Player/Coach	Bath (as player), Saracens (as player/coach), Leicester (as coach)
2017	England	Kyran Bracken	Player	Bristol, Saracens
2017	England	Nick Easter	Player/Coach	Harlequins (as player/coach), Newcastle, Worcester (as coach)
2017	England	Ben Kay	Player	Leicester
2017	England	Jason Robinson	Player	Sale
2019	England	Matt Dawson	Player	Northampton, Wasps
2019	New Zealand	Nick Evans	Player/Coach	Harlequins
2019	England	Jason Leonard	Player	Saracens, Harlequins
2021	England	Christian Day	Player	Sale, Northampton
2021	England	Andy Goode	Player	Leicester, Saracens, Worcester, Wasps, Newcastle
2021	England	Paul Grayson	Player/Coach	Northampton
2021	England	Steve Thompson	Player	Northampton, Leeds, Wasps
2022	England	Will Greenwood	Player	Harlequins, Leicester
2022	England	Tom Varndell	Player	Leicester, Wasps, Bristol
2022	England	Trevor Woodman	Player/Coach	Gloucester
2023	England	Matt Banahan	Player	Bath, Gloucester
2023	England	Brad Barritt	Player	Saracens
2023	England	Tom Youngs	Player	Leicester
2024	England	Danny Grewcock	Player/Coach	Saracens (as player), Bath (as player/coach), Bristol (as coach)
2024	England	Paul Sackey	Player	Bedford, London Irish, Wasps, Harlequins
2024	England	Richard Wigglesworth	Player/Coach	Sale, Saracens (as player), Leicester (as player/coach)

== Attendances ==
Season	Total	Average
2002–03	1,183,972	8,518
2003–04	1,241,557	9,062
2004–05	1,481,355	10,813
2005–06	1,483,920	10,922
2006–07	1,598,734	11,842
2007–08	1,517,863	11,243
2008–09	1,671,781	12,384
2009–10	1,900,177	14,075

Season	Total	Average
2010–11	1,740,751	12,894
2011–12	1,755,073	13,001
2012–13	1,684,804	12,480
2013–14	1,721,729	12,754
2014–15	1,804,914	13,370
2015–16	1,837,427	13,611
2016–17	2,033,805	15,065
2017–18	1,912,301	14,165

Season	Total	Average
2018–19	1,958,402	14,507
2019–20	1,032,509^{[a]}	13,237^{[a]}
2020–21	16,866^{[b]}	135^{[b]}
2021–22	1,947,439	12,564
2022–23	1,457,485	13,250
2023–24	1,428,276	15,358

^{a} Attendances only include matches up to the suspension of fixtures in March 2020. After this matches were played behind closed doors due to the COVID-19 pandemic, or as part of the trialled return of spectators with attendance limited to 3,500 or 1,000.
^{b} Most matches were played behind closed doors due to the COVID-19 pandemic.

== Finance and governance aspects ==
=== Men’s Professional Game Partnership ===
In 2024 the RFU, Premiership Rugby and the RPA agreed an 8-year Men's Professional Game Partnership (MPGP).

=== Salary cap ===
The English Premiership operates a salary cap, set by the Premiership Rugby Board, specifying the money a club can spend on the player salaries of its squad per season. Until the 2024–25 season, the base cap is £5 million, with an "academy credit" of up to £600,000 (£100,000 per player for up to six players).

A club may use the academy credit on a player that: (i) joined the club before his 18th birthday; (ii) is under age 24 at the start of the season; and (iii) earns a salary of more than £50,000. Under the credit scheme, the first £100,000 of a qualifying player's salary is not counted against the cap.

==== Exclusions ====
Since the 2022–23 season, each club has been allowed to exclude one player from the cap calculations, a decrease from two in prior seasons. An exception is made for any team which had two excluded players currently under contract. Both players remain excluded until the first of their contracts expire.

The "excluded player" slot can be filled by any player on a team's current roster who meets any of the following criteria:

- Played with his Premiership club for at least two full seasons before he was nominated as an excluded player.
- Played with his Premiership club for the full season before being nominated as an excluded player, after having played outside the Premiership.
- Played outside the Premiership in the season before he was nominated.

=== P shares ===
P shares were awarded in 2005 to the 13 clubs then in the Premiership. They are believed to entitle shareholders to a percentage of the central income of Premiership Rugby and voting rights on key issues.

== Media coverage ==
In the United Kingdom, Premiership Rugby is broadcast on TNT Sports (previously BT Sport) and streaming on HBO Max, since 26 March 2026. The broadcaster carries all Premiership Rugby fixtures (an increase from 80 to 93 regular season fixtures), as well as selected Premiership Rugby Cup fixtures.

ITV holds rights to carry a free-to-air highlights show, aired on ITV4 and ITV1. For the 2024–25 season, the highlight show—previously hosted by Craig Doyle and a panel of players—was rebooted as Gallagher Premiership Unleashed; in addition to highlights, the new format includes feature segments hosted by popular rugby-oriented social media personalities. Doyle—who produces the programme—stated that the programme was intended to help reach a wider audience, amid a collapse in viewership for the more traditional format.

Talksport and BBC Radio 5 Live, along with various BBC Local Radio stations, broadcast commentary and magazine programming.

In Australia, the Premiership is available on Stan Sport, while in New Zealand, it is on Sky Sports and, in Oceanic islands, on TVWan Sport. In the United States, the Premiership is available on FloSports since 2025. In Canada, it is broadcast on Sportsnet and, in Southern Africa, it is on SuperSport. In Malta, it is aired on TSN, in Italy on Mola, in France on RMC Sport, and in DACH on MTS and DAZN. In Czech Republic and Slovakia, it is on Nova Sport and, in Scandinavian states, it is on Viaplay. In MENA region and Asia, it is on Premier Sports. It has also been broadcast in China since 2017 and, in Japan, on DAZN.

== See also ==
- Top 14, French equivalent of the Premiership, second of the three major northern hemisphere leagues.
- United Rugby Championship, cross-border equivalent of the Premiership, third of the three major northern hemisphere leagues.
- English rugby union system
- List of English rugby union teams
- Premiership Rugby Cup
- Anglo-Welsh Cup (superseded by the Premiership Rugby Cup)
- Premiership Rugby Shield
- Champ Rugby
- European Professional Club Rugby
- European Rugby Champions Cup
- European Rugby Challenge Cup
- Premiership Rugby Sevens Series
- List of attendance figures at domestic professional sports leagues
- List of English rugby union stadiums by capacity
- List of professional sports teams in the United Kingdom
