= Beacon Park (Plymouth) =

Area in England

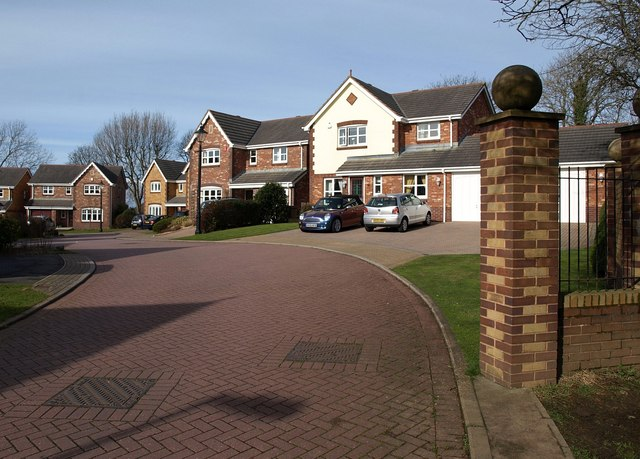
- Albion Drive
- Interactive map of Beacon Park (Plymouth)
- Location: Beacon Park Road, north Plymouth
- Coordinates: 50°23′44″N 4°09′16″W
- Capacity: 3,500 (450 seats)

Construction
- Opened: 1920
- Closed: 2003

Beacon Park (Plymouth) is the site of a former rugby union stadium on the north side of Beacon Park Road in north Plymouth. The site has been redeveloped into housing called Albion Drive.

== Rugby Union ==
When Devonport Albion merged with Plymouth RFC to become Plymouth Albion R.F.C. they moved into Beacon Park in 1920.

By the time the Courage Leagues were introduced in 1987 the ground capacity was stated by the club as being 1,950, which included 450 seated in the grandstand and space for around 1,500 standing, and other facilities included a club house and floodlights. Although it was small ground this figure may have been a little conservative, with crowds of over 3,000 taking place several times in the club's history, including a ground record of 3,420 against local rivals Exeter Chiefs in a league game on 14 December 2002.

== Greyhound racing ==
Greyhound racing started on the 5 May 1928 with racing over 525 yards behind a trackless hare. The greyhound racing was independent (unaffiliated to a governing body) and whippet racing was also prominent. New management took over during September 1929 and racing sometimes took place twice on one day at 3pm & 5pm.

Racing came to an end on 4 July 1931 after plans to transfer the greyhound racing to a new site in Lipson Vale were put in motion. The new site known as Castle Field would adopt the name Beacon Castle.

== Closure ==
Plymouth Albion moved out in 2003 and the stadium was sold and redeveloped into a housing estate called Barlow Gardens.

The nearby Albion Drive occupies the site of the former Beacon Park reservoir, which was demolished and built on around 2001.
