= Premiership Rugby Team of the Season =

English rugby union award

- Awarded for: The most outstanding XV in each given Premiership Rugby season
- Sponsored by: Gallagher
- Country: England
- Presented by: Premiership Rugby
- First award: 2000–01

The Premiership Rugby Team of the Season, formerly known as the Dream Team, is an annual rugby union award presented to players in England, which recognises the most outstanding fifteen players in the Premiership each season, with one player selected for each of the fifteen positions in a rugby union team.

The first Team of the Season award was presented as part of the 2000–01 end of season awards. The award has previously been sponsored by Sky Sports (2001–2010), ESPN (2011–2013) and BT Sport (2014–2023).

Five players share the record for most entries in the Team of the Season, each having been selected four times: Toby Flood, Mike Brown, Mako Vunipola, Danny Care and Ben Earl.

The Team of the Season is selected by a panel of experts, including members of the Rugby Players' Association (RPA) and the media.

== Selections ==
Key
Player (#)	Name of the player and number of times they have been selected
†	Indicates player also scored the most points in the same season
‡	Indicates player also scored the most tries in the same season
‖	Indicates player also won the Player of the Season award in the same season
¶	Indicates player also won the Young Player of the Season award in the same season
§	Denotes the club were Premiership Rugby champions in the same season

Premiership Rugby Team of the Season selections
Season	Position	Player	Club	Ref(s)
2000–01	1. Prop	(England) Jason Leonard	Harlequins	
2000–01	2. Hooker	(Ireland) Keith Wood	Harlequins	
2000–01	3. Prop	(England) Phil Vickery	Gloucester	
2000–01	4. Lock	(England) Martin Johnson	Leicester Tigers^{§}	
2000–01	5. Lock	(England) Danny Grewcock	Saracens	
2000–01	6. Flanker	(England) Neil Back	Leicester Tigers^{§}	
2000–01	7. Flanker	(England) Richard Hill	Saracens	
2000–01	8. Number 8	(England) Lawrence Dallaglio	Wasps	
2000–01	9. Scrum-half	(Wales) Gareth Cooper	Bath	
2000–01	10. Fly-half	(England) Mike Catt	Bath	
2000–01	11. Wing	(England) Jason Robinson	Sale Sharks	
2000–01	12. Centre	(Australia) Pat Howard‖	Leicester Tigers^{§}	
2000–01	13. Centre	(England) Will Greenwood	Harlequins	
2000–01	14. Wing	(Ireland) Geordan Murphy	Leicester Tigers^{§}	
2000–01	15. Full-back	(England) Iain Balshaw¶	Bath	
2001–02	No Team of the Season award			
2002–03	No Team of the Season award			
2003–04	No Team of the Season award			
2004–05	1. Prop	(England) Graham Rowntree	Leicester Tigers	
2004–05	2. Hooker	(England) George Chuter	Leicester Tigers	
2004–05	3. Prop	(England) Duncan Bell	Bath	
2004–05	4. Lock	(England) Bob Casey	London Irish	
2004–05	5. Lock	(England) Craig Gillies	Worcester Warriors	
2004–05	6. Flanker	(England) Andy Beattie	Bath	
2004–05	7. Flanker	(England) Pat Sanderson	Worcester Warriors	
2004–05	8. Number 8	(France) Sébastien Chabal	Sale Sharks	
2004–05	9. Scrum-half	(Wales) Matt Powell	Worcester Warriors	
2004–05	10. Fly-half	(England) Andy Goode†	Leicester Tigers	
2004–05	11. Wing	(Australia) Scott Staniforth	London Irish	
2004–05	12. Centre	(England) Chris Bell	Leeds	
2004–05	13. Centre	(England) Ayoola Erinle	Wasps^{§}	
2004–05	14. Wing	(England) Mark Cueto	Sale Sharks	
2004–05	15. Full-back	(New Zealand) Bruce Reihana	Northampton Saints	
2005–06	1. Prop	(England) Tony Windo	Worcester Warriors	
2005–06	2. Hooker	(England) Mark Regan	Bristol	
2005–06	3. Prop	(South Africa) Cobus Visagie	Saracens	
2005–06	4. Lock	(England) Danny Grewcock (2)	Bath	
2005–06	5. Lock	(England) Ben Kay	Leicester Tigers	
2005–06	6. Flanker	(England) Matt Salter	Bristol	
2005–06	7. Flanker	(England) Magnus Lund	Sale Sharks^{§}	
2005–06	8. Number 8	(Argentina) Juan Manuel Leguizamón	London Irish	
2005–06	9. Scrum-half	(New Zealand) Justin Marshall	Leeds	
2005–06	10. Fly-half	(New Zealand) Carlos Spencer	Northampton Saints	
2005–06	11. Wing	(England) Tom Voyce	Wasps	
2005–06	12. Centre	(England) Mike Catt‖ (2)	London Irish	
2005–06	13. Centre	(England) Mathew Tait	Newcastle	
2005–06	14. Wing	(England) Tom Varndell‡¶	Leicester Tigers	
2005–06	15. Full-back	(Australia) Matt Burke	Newcastle	
2006–07	1. Prop	(Italy) Martín Castrogiovanni‖	Leicester Tigers^{§}	
2006–07	2. Hooker	(England) George Chuter (2)	Leicester Tigers^{§}	
2006–07	3. Prop	(England) Darren Crompton	Bristol	
2006–07	4. Lock	(England) Roy Winters	Bristol	
2006–07	5. Lock	(Italy) Marco Bortolami	Gloucester	
2006–07	6. Flanker	(Argentina) Juan Martín Fernández Lobbe	Sale Sharks	
2006–07	7. Flanker	(England) Andy Hazell	Gloucester	
2006–07	8. Number 8	(England) Dan Ward-Smith	Bristol	
2006–07	9. Scrum-half	(England) Harry Ellis	Leicester Tigers^{§}	
2006–07	10. Fly-half	(New Zealand) Glen Jackson†	Saracens	
2006–07	11. Wing	(Samoa) David Lemi‡	Bristol	
2006–07	12. Centre	(England) Toby Flood	Newcastle	
2006–07	13. Centre	(Samoa) Seilala Mapusua	London Irish	
2006–07	14. Wing	(England) David Strettle	Harlequins	
2006–07	15. Full-back	(England) Mike Brown	Harlequins	
2007–08	1. Prop	(England) Nick Wood	Gloucester	
2007–08	2. Hooker	(England) Lee Mears	Bath	
2007–08	3. Prop	(England) Matt Stevens	Bath	
2007–08	4. Lock	(England) Nick Kennedy	London Irish	
2007–08	5. Lock	(England) Danny Grewcock (3)	Bath	
2007–08	6. Flanker	(England) Chris Robshaw	Harlequins	
2007–08	7. Flanker	(England) Michael Lipman	Bath	
2007–08	8. Number 8	(England) Tom Guest	Harlequins	
2007–08	9. Scrum-half	(South Africa) Michael Claassens	Bath	
2007–08	10. Fly-half	(England) Danny Cipriani¶	Wasps^{§}	
2007–08	11. Wing	(Samoa) Sailosi Tagicakibau	London Irish	
2007–08	12. Centre	(England) Olly Barkley	Bath	
2007–08	13. Centre	(New Zealand) Luke McAlister	Sale Sharks	
2007–08	14. Wing	(England) Paul Sackey	Wasps^{§}	
2007–08	15. Full-back	(England) Richard Haughton	Saracens	
2008–09	1. Prop	(Argentina) Marcos Ayerza	Leicester Tigers^{§}	
2008–09	2. Hooker	(England) Lee Mears (2)	Bath	
2008–09	3. Prop	(Ireland) Mike Ross	Harlequins	
2008–09	4. Lock	(England) Dean Schofield	Sale Sharks	
2008–09	5. Lock	(England) Ben Kay (2)	Leicester Tigers^{§}	
2008–09	6. Flanker	(England) Chris Robshaw‖ (2)	Harlequins	
2008–09	7. Flanker	(England) Steffon Armitage	London Irish	
2008–09	8. Number 8	(Argentina) Juan Martín Fernández Lobbe (2)	Sale Sharks	
2008–09	9. Scrum-half	(England) Paul Hodgson	London Irish	
2008–09	10. Fly-half	(England) Charlie Hodgson	Sale Sharks	
2008–09	11. Wing	(England) Ugo Monye	Harlequins	
2008–09	12. Centre	(Samoa) Seilala Mapusua (2)	London Irish	
2008–09	13. Centre	(Argentina) Gonzalo Tiesi	Harlequins	
2008–09	14. Wing	(New Zealand) Joe Maddock‡	Bath	
2008–09	15. Full-back	(England) Olly Morgan	Gloucester	
2009–10	1. Prop	Soane Tonga'uiha	Northampton Saints	
2009–10	2. Hooker	(South Africa) Schalk Brits	Saracens	
2009–10	3. Prop	(New Zealand) Carl Hayman	Newcastle	
2009–10	4. Lock	(South Africa) Marco Wentzel	Leeds	
2009–10	5. Lock	(South Africa) Juandré Kruger	Northampton Saints	
2009–10	6. Flanker	(England) Phil Dowson	Northampton Saints	
2009–10	7. Flanker	(South Africa) Hendre Fourie	Leeds	
2009–10	8. Number 8	(South Africa) Ernst Joubert	Saracens	
2009–10	9. Scrum-half	(England) Ben Youngs¶	Leicester Tigers^{§}	
2009–10	10. Fly-half	(England) Toby Flood (2)	Leicester Tigers^{§}	
2009–10	11. Wing	(New Zealand) Scott Hamilton	Northampton Saints	
2009–10	12. Centre	(England) Brad Barritt	Saracens	
2009–10	13. Centre	(Fiji) Seru Rabeni	Leeds	
2009–10	14. Wing	(England) Chris Ashton‡‖	Northampton Saints	
2009–10	15. Full-back	(England) Alex Goode	Saracens	
2010–11	1. Prop	Soane Tonga'uiha (2)	Northampton Saints	
2010–11	2. Hooker	(South Africa) Schalk Brits (2)	Saracens^{§}	
2010–11	3. Prop	(South Africa) Brian Mujati	Northampton Saints	
2010–11	4. Lock	(England) Courtney Lawes	Northampton Saints	
2010–11	5. Lock	(Ireland) Tom Hayes	Exeter Chiefs	
2010–11	6. Flanker	(England) Tom Wood‖	Northampton Saints	
2010–11	7. Flanker	(Namibia) Jacques Burger	Saracens	
2010–11	8. Number 8	(England) Thomas Waldrom	Leicester Tigers	
2010–11	9. Scrum-half	(England) Danny Care	Harlequins	
2010–11	10. Fly-half	(New Zealand) Jimmy Gopperth†	Newcastle	
2010–11	11. Wing	(England) Chris Ashton (2)	Northampton Saints	
2010–11	12. Centre	(England) Anthony Allen	Leicester Tigers	
2010–11	13. Centre	(England) Manu Tuilagi¶	Leicester Tigers	
2010–11	14. Wing	(England) David Strettle (2)	Saracens^{§}	
2010–11	15. Full-back	(England) Mike Brown (2)	Harlequins	
2011–12	1. Prop	(England) Joe Marler	Harlequins^{§}	
2011–12	2. Hooker	(South Africa) Schalk Brits (3)	Saracens	
2011–12	3. Prop	(England) Dan Cole	Leicester Tigers	
2011–12	4. Lock	(United States) Samu Manoa	Northampton Saints	
2011–12	5. Lock	(England) Geoff Parling	Leicester Tigers	
2011–12	6. Flanker	(England) Chris Robshaw‖ (3)	Harlequins^{§}	
2011–12	7. Flanker	(England) James Scaysbrook	Exeter Chiefs	
2011–12	8. Number 8	(England) Nick Easter	Harlequins^{§}	
2011–12	9. Scrum-half	(England) Haydn Thomas	Exeter Chiefs	
2011–12	10. Fly-half	(England) Toby Flood (3)	Leicester Tigers	
2011–12	11. Wing	(Samoa) Alesana Tuilagi	Leicester Tigers	
2011–12	12. Centre	(England) George Lowe	Harlequins^{§}	
2011–12	13. Centre	(Samoa) George Pisi	Northampton Saints	
2011–12	14. Wing	(Argentina) Horacio Agulla	Leicester Tigers	
2011–12	15. Full-back	(England) Mike Brown (3)	Harlequins^{§}	
2012–13	1. Prop	(England) Mako Vunipola	Saracens	
2012–13	2. Hooker	(England) Tom Youngs‖	Leicester Tigers^{§}	
2012–13	3. Prop	(England) Dan Cole (2)	Leicester Tigers^{§}	
2012–13	4. Lock	(England) Ed Slater	Leicester Tigers^{§}	
2012–13	5. Lock	(England) Geoff Parling (2)	Leicester Tigers^{§}	
2012–13	6. Flanker	(England) Tom Wood (2)	Northampton Saints	
2012–13	7. Flanker	(Australia) Julian Salvi	Leicester Tigers^{§}	
2012–13	8. Number 8	(England) Richard Baxter	Exeter Chiefs	
2012–13	9. Scrum-half	(England) Ben Youngs (2)	Leicester Tigers^{§}	
2012–13	10. Fly-half	(England) Toby Flood (4)	Leicester Tigers^{§}	
2012–13	11. Wing	(England) Tom Varndell‡ (2)	Wasps	
2012–13	12. Centre	(England) Billy Twelvetrees	Gloucester	
2012–13	13. Centre	(England) Manu Tuilagi (2)	Leicester Tigers^{§}	
2012–13	14. Wing	(England) Christian Wade‡	Wasps	
2012–13	15. Full-back	(England) Luke Arscott	Exeter Chiefs	
2013–14	1. Prop	(England) Joe Marler (2)	Harlequins	
2013–14	2. Hooker	(England) Dave Ward	Harlequins	
2013–14	3. Prop	(Samoa) Logovi'i Mulipola	Leicester Tigers	
2013–14	4. Lock	(United States) Samu Manoa (2)	Northampton Saints^{§}	
2013–14	5. Lock	(New Zealand) Michael Paterson	Sale Sharks	
2013–14	6. Flanker	(New Zealand) Daniel Braid	Sale Sharks	
2013–14	7. Flanker	(Namibia) Jacques Burger (2)	Saracens	
2013–14	8. Number 8	(England) Billy Vunipola¶	Saracens	
2013–14	9. Scrum-half	(England) Danny Care (2)	Harlequins	
2013–14	10. Fly-half	(England) Stephen Myler	Northampton Saints^{§}	
2013–14	11. Wing	(Fiji) Vereniki Goneva‡	Leicester Tigers	
2013–14	12. Centre	(England) Kyle Eastmond	Bath	
2013–14	13. Centre	(England) Luther Burrell	Northampton Saints^{§}	
2013–14	14. Wing	(England) Semesa Rokoduguni	Wasps	
2013–14	15. Full-back	(England) Mike Brown‖ (4)	Harlequins^{§}	
2014–15	1. Prop	(England) Matt Mullan	Wasps	
2014–15	2. Hooker	(England) Jamie George	Saracens^{§}	
2014–15	3. Prop	(Wales) Tomas Francis	Exeter Chiefs	
2014–15	4. Lock	(England) Graham Kitchener	Leicester Tigers	
2014–15	5. Lock	(Australia) Dean Mumm	Exeter Chiefs	
2014–15	6. Flanker	(Zimbabwe) Dave Ewers	Exeter Chiefs	
2014–15	7. Flanker	(South Africa) Francois Louw	Bath	
2014–15	8. Number 8	(England) Nathan Hughes	Wasps	
2014–15	9. Scrum-half	(England) Joe Simpson	Wasps	
2014–15	10. Fly-half	(England) George Ford‖	Bath	
2014–15	11. Wing	(Samoa) Sinoti Sinoti	Newcastle	
2014–15	12. Centre	(England) Henry Slade¶	Exeter Chiefs	
2014–15	13. Centre	(England) Jonathan Joseph	Bath	
2014–15	14. Wing	(England) Christian Wade (2)	Wasps	
2014–15	15. Full-back	(England) Anthony Watson	Bath	
2015–16	1. Prop	(England) Mako Vunipola (2)	Saracens^{§}	
2015–16	2. Hooker	(England) Mike Haywood	Northampton Saints	
2015–16	3. Prop	(Moldova) Vadim Cobîlaș	Sale Sharks	
2015–16	4. Lock	(England) Maro Itoje¶	Saracens^{§}	
2015–16	5. Lock	(England) George Kruis	Saracens^{§}	
2015–16	6. Flanker	(England) Teimana Harrison	Northampton Saints	
2015–16	7. Flanker	(Australia) George Smith	Wasps	
2015–16	8. Number 8	(England) Billy Vunipola (2)	Saracens^{§}	
2015–16	9. Scrum-half	(South Africa) Francois Hougaard	Worcester Warriors	
2015–16	10. Fly-half	(Ireland) Gareth Steenson†	Exeter Chiefs	
2015–16	11. Wing	(Tonga) Telusa Veainu	Leicester Tigers	
2015–16	12. Centre	(New Zealand) Charles Piutau	Wasps	
2015–16	13. Centre	(England) Elliot Daly	Wasps	
2015–16	14. Wing	(England) Jack Nowell	Exeter Chiefs	
2015–16	15. Full-back	(England) Alex Goode‖ (2)	Saracens^{§}	
2016–17	1. Prop	(England) Mako Vunipola (3)	Saracens	
2016–17	2. Hooker	(England) Jamie George (2)	Saracens	
2016–17	3. Prop	(England) Kyle Sinckler	Harlequins	
2016–17	4. Lock	(England) Joe Launchbury	Wasps	
2016–17	5. Lock	(England) Courtney Lawes (2)	Northampton Saints	
2016–17	6. Flanker	(England) Don Armand	Exeter Chiefs^{§}	
2016–17	7. Flanker	(England) Jackson Wray	Saracens	
2016–17	8. Number 8	(France) Louis Picamoles	Northampton Saints	
2016–17	9. Scrum-half	(England) Richard Wigglesworth	Saracens	
2016–17	10. Fly-half	(New Zealand) Jimmy Gopperth†‖ (2)	Wasps	
2016–17	11. Wing	(England) Olly Woodburn	Exeter Chiefs^{§}	
2016–17	12. Centre	(England) Brad Barritt (2)	Saracens	
2016–17	13. Centre	(England) Elliot Daly (2)	Wasps	
2016–17	14. Wing	(England) Christian Wade‡ (3)	Wasps	
2016–17	15. Full-back	(Tonga) Telusa Veainu (2)	Leicester Tigers	
2017–18	1. Prop	(England) Ellis Genge	Leicester Tigers	
2017–18	2. Hooker	(England) Luke Cowan-Dickie	Exeter Chiefs	
2017–18	3. Prop	(New Zealand) John Afoa	Gloucester	
2017–18	4. Lock	(England) Calum Green	Newcastle	
2017–18	5. Lock	(England) Ed Slater (2)	Gloucester	
2017–18	6. Flanker	(England) Jamie Gibson	Northampton Saints	
2017–18	7. Flanker	(England) Don Armand (2)	Exeter Chiefs	
2017–18	8. Number 8	(England) Sam Simmonds¶	Exeter Chiefs	
2017–18	9. Scrum-half	(South Africa) Faf de Klerk	Sale Sharks	
2017–18	10. Fly-half	(England) Danny Cipriani (2)	Wasps	
2017–18	11. Wing	(Wales) Josh Adams‡	Worcester Warriors	
2017–18	12. Centre	(Australia) Matt To'omua	Leicester Tigers	
2017–18	13. Centre	(Australia) Rob Horne	Northampton Saints	
2017–18	14. Wing	(Fiji) Vereniki Goneva‡‖	Newcastle	
2017–18	15. Full-back	(South Africa) Willie le Roux	Wasps	
2018–19	1. Prop	(England) Mako Vunipola (4)	Saracens^{§}	
2018–19	2. Hooker	(England) Jamie George (3)	Saracens^{§}	
2018–19	3. Prop	(New Zealand) John Afoa (2)	Bristol	
2018–19	4. Lock	(South Africa) Franco Mostert	Gloucester	
2018–19	5. Lock	(Australia) Will Skelton	Saracens^{§}	
2018–19	6. Flanker	(England) Alex Dombrandt	Harlequins	
2018–19	7. Flanker	(England) Tom Curry¶	Sale Sharks	
2018–19	8. Number 8	(England) Matt Kvesic	Exeter Chiefs	
2018–19	9. Scrum-half	(South Africa) Cobus Reinach‡	Northampton Saints	
2018–19	10. Fly-half	(England) Danny Cipriani‖ (3)	Gloucester	
2018–19	11. Wing	(England) Ollie Thorley	Gloucester	
2018–19	12. Centre	(England) Mark Atkinson	Gloucester	
2018–19	13. Centre	(England) Henry Slade (2)	Exeter Chiefs	
2018–19	14. Wing	(Argentina) Santiago Cordero	Exeter Chiefs	
2018–19	15. Full-back	(England) Alex Goode (3)	Saracens^{§}	
2019–20	1. Prop	(England) Beno Obano	Bath	
2019–20	2. Hooker	(England) Luke Cowan-Dickie (2)	Exeter Chiefs^{§}	
2019–20	3. Prop	(England) Will Stuart	Bath	
2019–20	4. Lock	(England) Jonny Hill	Exeter Chiefs^{§}	
2019–20	5. Lock	(England) Maro Itoje (2)	Saracens	
2019–20	6. Flanker	(England) Jack Willis‖¶	Wasps	
2019–20	7. Flanker	(England) Ben Earl‡	Saracens and Bristol	
2019–20	8. Number 8	(England) Sam Simmonds (2)	Exeter Chiefs^{§}	
2019–20	9. Scrum-half	(England) Ben Spencer	Saracens and Bath	
2019–20	10. Fly-half	(England) Jacob Umaga	Wasps	
2019–20	11. Wing	(England) Ollie Thorley‡ (2)	Gloucester	
2019–20	12. Centre	(England) Sam James	Sale Sharks	
2019–20	13. Centre	(Fiji) Semi Radradra	Bristol	
2019–20	14. Wing	(England) Zach Kibirige	Wasps	
2019–20	15. Full-back	(New Zealand) Charles Piutau (2)	Bristol	
2020–21	1. Prop	(England) Ellis Genge (2)	Leicester Tigers	
2020–21	2. Hooker	(South Africa) Akker van der Merwe	Sale Sharks	
2020–21	3. Prop	(New Zealand) John Afoa (3)	Bristol	
2020–21	4. Lock	(Samoa) Chris Vui	Bristol	
2020–21	5. Lock	(England) David Ribbans	Northampton Saints	
2020–21	6. Flanker	(Zimbabwe) Dave Ewers (2)	Exeter Chiefs	
2020–21	7. Flanker	(England) Will Evans	Harlequins^{§}	
2020–21	8. Number 8	(England) Sam Simmonds‡‖ (3)	Exeter Chiefs	
2020–21	9. Scrum-half	(England) Danny Care (3)	Harlequins^{§}	
2020–21	10. Fly-half	(England) Marcus Smith†	Harlequins^{§}	
2020–21	11. Wing	(England) Josh Bassett	Wasps	
2020–21	12. Centre	(England) Piers O'Conor	Bristol	
2020–21	13. Centre	(Fiji) Semi Radradra (2)	Bristol	
2020–21	14. Wing	(England) Tom O'Flaherty	Exeter Chiefs	
2020–21	15. Full-back	(New Zealand) Charles Piutau (3)	Bristol	
2021–22	1. Prop	(England) Ellis Genge (3)	Leicester Tigers^{§}	
2021–22	2. Hooker	(England) George McGuigan	Newcastle	
2021–22	3. Prop	(England) Will Collier	Harlequins	
2021–22	4. Lock	(South Africa) Jean-Luc du Preez	Sale Sharks	
2021–22	5. Lock	(England) Freddie Clarke	Gloucester	
2021–22	6. Flanker	(South Africa) Hanro Liebenberg	Leicester Tigers^{§}	
2021–22	7. Flanker	(England) Ben Earl‖ (2)	Saracens	
2021–22	8. Number 8	(England) Brad Shields	Wasps	
2021–22	9. Scrum-half	(England) Danny Care (4)	Harlequins	
2021–22	10. Fly-half	(England) George Ford† (2)	Leicester Tigers^{§}	
2021–22	11. Wing	(England) Cadan Murley	Harlequins	
2021–22	12. Centre	(South Africa) André Esterhuizen	Harlequins	
2021–22	13. Centre	(Scotland) Chris Harris	Gloucester	
2021–22	14. Wing	(England) Max Malins‡	Saracens	
2021–22	15. Full-back	(England) Freddie Steward	Leicester Tigers^{§}	
2022–23	1. Prop	(England) Val Rapava-Ruskin	Gloucester	
2022–23	2. Hooker	(Argentina) Julián Montoya	Leicester Tigers	
2022–23	3. Prop	(Italy) Marco Riccioni	Saracens^{§}	
2022–23	4. Lock	(England) George Martin	Leicester Tigers	
2022–23	5. Lock	(England) David Ribbans (2)	Northampton Saints	
2022–23	6. Flanker	(England) Ben Earl (3)	Saracens^{§}	
2022–23	7. Flanker	(England) Tom Pearson¶	London Irish	
2022–23	8. Number 8	(South Africa) Jasper Wiese	Leicester Tigers	
2022–23	9. Scrum-half	(England) Alex Mitchell	Northampton Saints	
2022–23	10. Fly-half	(South Africa) Robert du Preez	Sale Sharks	
2022–23	11. Wing	(Argentina) Mateo Carreras	Newcastle	
2022–23	12. Centre	(England) Fraser Dingwall	Northampton Saints	
2022–23	13. Centre	(England) Ollie Lawrence‖	Bath	
2022–23	14. Wing	(England) Cadan Murley‡ (2)	Harlequins	
2022–23	15. Full-back	(England) Joe Carpenter	Sale Sharks	
2023–24	1. Prop	(England) Fin Baxter	Harlequins	
2023–24	2. Hooker	(England) Curtis Langdon	Northampton Saints^{§}	
2023–24	3. Prop	(South Africa) Thomas du Toit	Bath	
2023–24	4. Lock	(England) Rus Tuima	Exeter Chiefs	
2023–24	5. Lock	(England) Alex Coles	Northampton Saints^{§}	
2023–24	6. Flanker	(England) Courtney Lawes (3)	Northampton Saints^{§}	
2023–24	7. Flanker	(England) Ben Earl (4)	Saracens	
2023–24	8. Number 8	(South Africa) Jasper Wiese (2)	Leicester Tigers	
2023–24	9. Scrum-half	(England) Ben Spencer (2)	Bath	
2023–24	10. Fly-half	(England) Fin Smith	Northampton Saints^{§}	
2023–24	11. Wing	(England) Ollie Sleightholme‡	Northampton Saints^{§}	
2023–24	12. Centre	(South Africa) Benhard Janse van Rensburg	Bristol	
2023–24	13. Centre	(England) Henry Slade†‖ (3)	Bath	
2023–24	14. Wing	(England) Immanuel Feyi-Waboso¶	Exeter Chiefs	
2023–24	15. Full-back	(South Africa) Tyrone Green	Harlequins	
2024–25	1. Prop	(Wales) Nicky Smith	Leicester Tigers	
2024–25	2. Hooker	(England) Tom Dunn	Bath^{§}	
2024–25	3. Prop	(South Africa) Thomas du Toit (2)	Bath^{§}	
2024–25	4. Lock	(England) Maro Itoje (3)	Saracens	
2024–25	5. Lock	(England) Joe Batley	Bristol	
2024–25	6. Flanker	(England) Ted Hill	Bath^{§}	
2024–25	7. Flanker	(England) Ben Curry	Sale Sharks	
2024–25	8. Number 8	(England) Tom Willis	Saracens	
2024–25	9. Scrum-half	(Wales) Tomos Williams‖	Gloucester	
2024–25	10. Fly-half	(England) George Ford (3)	Sale Sharks	
2024–25	11. Wing	(England) Gabriel Ibitoye‡	Bristol	
2024–25	12. Centre	(South Africa) Benhard Janse van Rensburg (2)	Bristol	
2024–25	13. Centre	(South Africa) Robert du Preez (2)	Sale Sharks	
2024–25	14. Wing	(England) Tom Roebuck	Sale Sharks	
2024–25	15. Full-back	(Argentina) Santiago Carreras	Gloucester	
2025–26	1. Prop	(England) Ellis Genge (4)	Bristol Bears	
2025–26	2. Hooker	(England) Jamie Blamire	Leicester Tigers	
2025–26	3. Prop	(South Africa) Thomas du Toit (3)	Bath	
2025–26	4. Lock	(England) Ollie Chessum	Leicester Tigers	
2025–26	5. Lock	(Italy) Andrea Zambonin	Exeter Chiefs	
2025–26	6. Flanker	(Australia) Tom Hooper	Exeter Chiefs	
2025–26	7. Flanker	(England) Fitz Harding	Bristol Bears	
2025–26	8. Number 8	(England) Tom Willis‖ (2)	Saracens	
2025–26	9. Scrum-half	(England) Ben Spencer (3)	Bath	
2025–26	10. Fly-half	(England) Billy Searle	Leicester Tigers	
2025–26	11. Wing	(England) Immanuel Feyi-Waboso (2)	Exeter Chiefs	
2025–26	12. Centre	(South Africa) Benhard Janse van Rensburg (3)	Bristol Bears	
2025–26	13. Centre	(England) Henry Slade (4)	Exeter Chiefs	
2025–26	14. Wing	(England) Tommy Freeman	Northampton Saints	
2025–26	15. Full-back	(England) Freddie Steward (2)	Leicester Tigers	

== Players with multiple entries ==
The following table lists players who have been selected in at least two Team of the Season selections.

Players in bold are still active in Premiership Rugby. Players in italics are still active in professional rugby outside of the Premiership.

Awards	Player	Country	Seasons
4	Toby Flood	England	2006–07, 2009–10, 2011–12, 2012–13
4	Mike Brown	England	2006–07, 2010–11, 2011–12, 2013–14
4	Mako Vunipola	England	2012–13, 2015–16, 2016–17, 2018–19
4	Danny Care	England	2006–07, 2013–14, 2020–21, 2021–22
4	**Ben Earl**	England	2019–20, 2021–22, 2022–23, 2023–24
4	**Ellis Genge**	England	2017–18, 2020–21, 2021–22, 2025–26
4	**Henry Slade**	England	2014–15, 2018–19, 2023–24, 2025–26
3	Danny Grewcock	England	2000–01, 2005–06, 2007–08
3	Chris Robshaw	England	2007–08, 2008–09, 2011–12
3	Schalk Brits	South Africa	2009–10, 2010–11, 2011–12
3	**Christian Wade**	England	2012–13, 2014–15, 2016–17
3	Danny Cipriani	England	2007–08, 2017–18, 2018–19
3	Alex Goode	England	2009–10, 2015–16, 2018–19
3	**Jamie George**	England	2014–15, 2016–17, 2018–19
3	Charles Piutau	New Zealand	2015–16, 2019–20, 2020–21
3	John Afoa	New Zealand	2017–18, 2018–19, 2020–21
3	Sam Simmonds	England	2017–18, 2019–20, 2020–21
3	Courtney Lawes	England	2010–11, 2016–17, 2023–24
3	**George Ford**	England	2014–15, 2021–22, 2024–25
3	**Maro Itoje**	England	2015–16, 2019–20, 2024–25
3	**Ben Spencer**	England	2019–20, 2023–24, 2025–26
3	**Thomas du Toit**	South Africa	2023–24, 2024–25, 2025–26
3	**Benhard Janse van Rensburg**	South Africa	2023–24, 2024–25, 2025–26
2	Mike Catt	England	2000–01, 2005–06
2	George Chuter	England	2004–05, 2006–07
2	Ben Kay	England	2005–06, 2008–09
2	Juan Martín Fernández Lobbe	Argentina	2006–07, 2008–09
2	Seilala Mapusua	Samoa	2006–07, 2008–09
2	Lee Mears	England	2007–08, 2008–09
2	David Strettle	England	2006–07, 2010–11
2	Soane Tonga'uiha	Tonga	2009–10, 2010–11
2	Chris Ashton	England	2009–10, 2010–11
2	Tom Varndell	England	2005–06, 2012–13
2	Ben Youngs	England	2009–10, 2012–13
2	Tom Wood	England	2010–11, 2012–13
2	Manu Tuilagi	England	2010–11, 2012–13
2	Dan Cole	England	2011–12, 2012–13
2	Geoff Parling	England	2011–12, 2012–13
2	Jacques Burger	Namibia	2010–11, 2013–14
2	Joe Marler	England	2011–12, 2013–14
2	Samu Manoa	USA	2011–12, 2013–14
2	Billy Vunipola	England	2013–14, 2015–16
2	Brad Barritt	England	2009–10, 2016–17
2	Jimmy Gopperth	New Zealand	2010–11, 2016–17
2	Telusa Veainu	Tonga	2015–16, 2016–17
2	**Elliot Daly**	England	2015–16, 2016–17
2	Ed Slater	England	2012–13, 2017–18
2	Vereniki Goneva	Fiji	2013–14, 2017–18
2	Don Armand	England	2016–17, 2017–18
2	**Luke Cowan-Dickie**	England	2017–18, 2019–20
2	**Ollie Thorley**	England	2018–19, 2019–20
2	Dave Ewers	Zimbabwe	2014–15, 2020–21
2	Semi Radradra	Fiji	2019–20, 2020–21
2	David Ribbans	England	2020–21, 2022–23
2	**Cadan Murley**	England	2021–22, 2022–23
2	Jasper Wiese	South Africa	2022–23, 2023–24
2	**Robert du Preez**	South Africa	2022–23, 2024–25
2	**Freddie Steward**	England	2021–22, 2025–26
2	**Tom Willis**	England	2024–25, 2025–26

== Entries by nationality ==
Country	Players	Total
England	159	221
South Africa	23	29
New Zealand	13	18
Argentina	9	10
Samoa	9	10
Australia	9	9
Wales	6	6
Ireland	5	5
Fiji	3	5
Tonga	2	4
Italy	3	3
France	2	2
Namibia	1	2
USA	1	2
Zimbabwe	1	2
Moldova	1	1
Scotland	1	1

== Entries by club ==
Club	Players	Total
Leicester Tigers	38	53
Saracens	22	42 (Note: Ben Spencer played for both Saracens and Bath in the 2019–20 season) (Note: Ben Earl played for both Saracens and Bristol in the 2019–20 season)
Northampton Saints	28	35
Harlequins	24	34
Bath	22	31
Exeter Chiefs	23	31
Wasps	20	26
Sale Sharks	20	23
Bristol	14	22
Gloucester	15	18
London Irish	9	11
Newcastle	9	10
Worcester Warriors	6	6
Leeds	5	5

== See also ==
- Premiership Rugby Player of the Season
- Premiership Rugby Young Player of the Season
- Premiership Rugby top scorers
- Premiership Rugby Director of Rugby of the Season
