= Premiership Rugby top scorers =

PREM Rugby top scorers
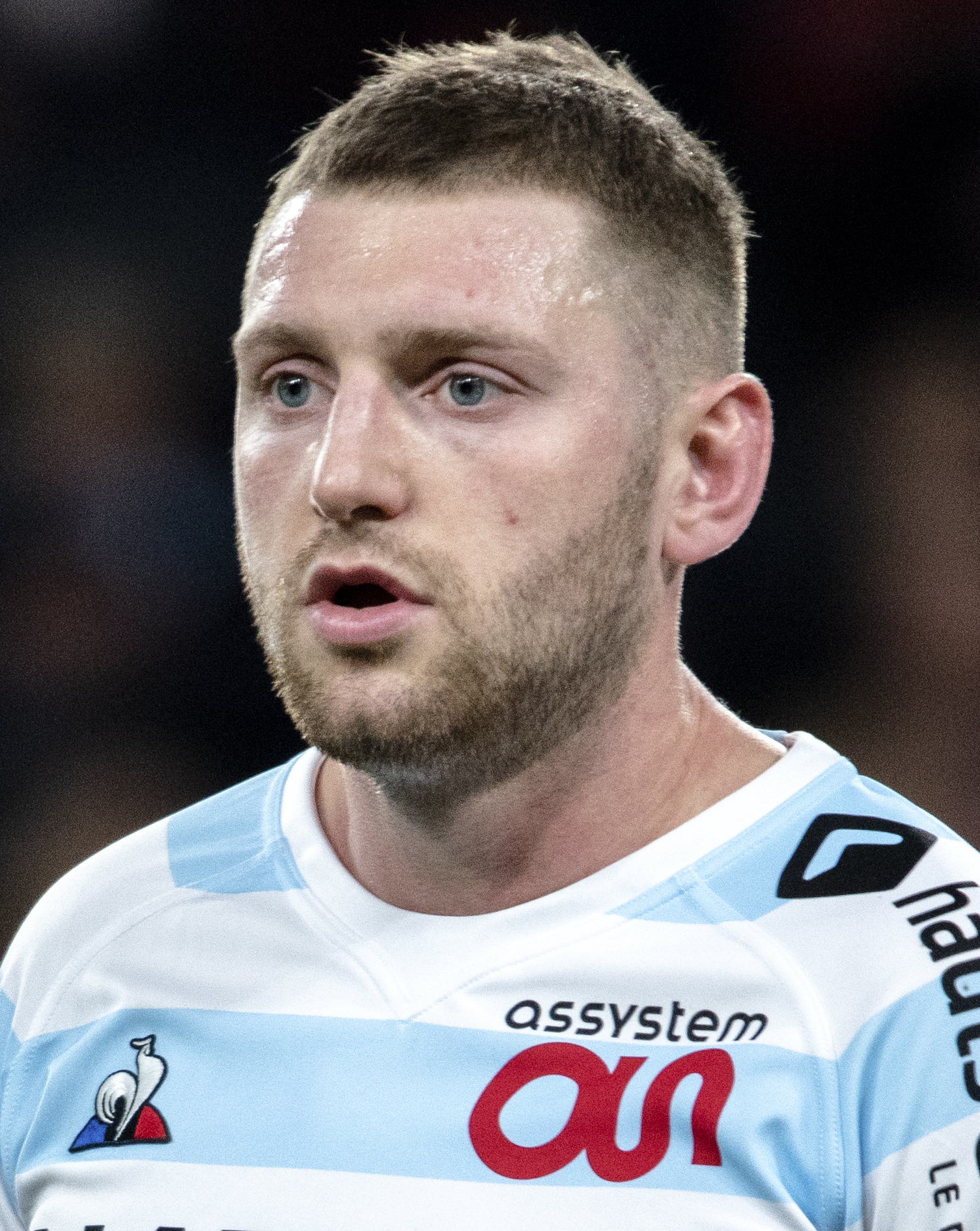
- Finn Russell scored 183 points in the 2024–25 season.
- Awarded for: The leading points scorer and try scorer in a given Premiership Rugby season
- Country: England
- Presented by: Premiership Rugby
- First award: 1998
- Currently held by: Finn Russell (points); Gabriel Ibitoye & Ollie Hassell-Collins (tries)

Highlights
- Most wins: Andy Goode (points, 4); Tom Varndell & Christian Wade (tries, 3)

This is a list of the top points scorers and top try scorers in each season of Premiership Rugby, England's top division of rugby union. Formed in 1997 as an independent top division the awards form part of Premiership Rugby's end of season awards show.

The points award has been won by 17 different players, with Andy Goode recording the most wins with 4 at three different clubs. Saracens players have won the award most often, with four other winners alongside Goode. The highest points total to win the award was 343 by Barry Everitt in 2001–02.

== Points scorers ==
Key
Player (X)	Name of the player and number of times they had won the award at that point (if more than one)
Games	The number of Premiership Rugby games played by the winner that season (Note: This does not necessarily match the total number of games in a season.)
PPG	The winner's points-per-games ratio that season
†	Indicates multiple award winners in the same season
§	Denotes the club were Premiership Rugby champions in the same season

Premiership Rugby leading points scorers
Season	Player	Nationality	Club	Points	Games (Note: For the 1998–99 season, Premiership Rugby consisted of 14 teams (26 games). In all other seasons, there were 12 teams (22 games) until the 2021–22 season, which had 13 teams (24 games). The 2022–23 season had 11 teams (20 games). From the 2023–24 season, there were 10 teams (20 games). From the 2002–03 Premiership Rugby season onward, playoff games are included in the totals.)	PPG	Ref(s)
1997–98	Michael Lynagh	Australia	Saracens	279	19	14.68	
1998–99	John Schuster	New Zealand	Harlequins	331	22	15.05	
1999–2000	Jarrod Cunningham	New Zealand	London Irish	324	22	14.72	
2000–01	Kenny Logan	Scotland	Wasps	282	18	15.66	
2001–02	Barry Everitt	Ireland	London Irish	343	21	16.33	
2002–03	Alex King	England	Wasps^{§}	284	23	12.35	
2003–04	Andy Goode	England	Saracens/Leicester Tigers	266	20	13.30	
2004–05	Andy Goode (2)	England	Leicester Tigers	268	18	14.88	
2005–06	Charlie Hodgson	England	Sale Sharks^{§}	248	16	15.5	
2006–07	Glen Jackson	New Zealand	Saracens	281	22	12.77	
2007–08	Andy Goode (3)	England	Leicester Tigers	207	18	11.5	
2008–09	Glen Jackson (2)	New Zealand	Saracens	239	21	11.38	
2009–10	Jimmy Gopperth	New Zealand	Newcastle Falcons	219	21	10.43	
2010–11	Jimmy Gopperth (2)	New Zealand	Newcastle Falcons	230	22	10.45	
2011–12	Tom Homer	England	London Irish	278	22	12.63	
2012–13	Nick Evans	New Zealand	Harlequins	258	20	12.90	
2013–14	George Ford	England	Bath	250	21	11.90	
2014–15	Andy Goode (4)	England	Wasps	240	21	11.43	
2015–16	Gareth Steenson	Ireland	Exeter Chiefs	258	24	10.75	
2016–17	Jimmy Gopperth (3)	New Zealand	Wasps	292	23	12.69	
2017–18	Owen Farrell	England	Saracens^{§}	217	15	14.46	
2018–19	George Ford (2)	England	Leicester Tigers	221	16	13.81	
2019–20	Rhys Priestland	Wales	Bath	206	22	9.36	
2020–21	Marcus Smith	England	Harlequins^{§}	286	22	13	
2021–22	George Ford (3)	England	Leicester Tigers^{§}	220	20	11	
2022–23	Paddy Jackson	Ireland	London Irish	205	20	10.25	
2023–24	Fin Smith	England	Northampton Saints^{§}	157	17	9.2	
2024–25	Finn Russell	Scotland	Bath^{§}	183	18	10.2	
Season	Player	Nationality	Club	Points	Games	PPG	Ref(s)

=== By nationality ===
Nationality	Seasons won
England	13
New Zealand	8
Ireland	3
Scotland	2
Australia; Wales	1

=== By club ===
Club	Seasons won
Saracens; Leicester Tigers	5
Wasps; London Irish	4
Harlequins; Bath	3
Newcastle Falcons; Exeter Chiefs	2
Sale Sharks	1
Northampton Saints	1

== Try scorers ==
Key
Player (X)	Name of the player and number of times they had won the award at that point (if more than one)
Games	The number of Premiership Rugby games played by the winner that season
Rate	The winner's try scoring to games ratio that season
†	Indicates multiple award winners in the same season
§	Denotes the club were Premiership Rugby champions in the same season

Premiership Rugby leading try scorers
Season	Player	Nationality	Club	Tries	Games	Rate	Ref(s)
1997–98	Dominic Chapman	England	Richmond	17	17	1.00	
1998–99	Neil Back	England	Leicester Tigers^{§}	16	23	0.69	
1999–2000	Iain Balshaw	England	Bath	15	21	0.71	
2000–01	Paul Sampson	England	Wasps	12	15	0.80	
2001–02	Mark Cueto	England	Sale Sharks	13	21	0.62	
2002–03	Steve Hanley	England	Sale Sharks	14	22	0.63	
2003–04^{†}	Steve Hanley (2)	England	Sale Sharks	13	20	0.65	
2003–04^{†}	Bruce Reihana	New Zealand	Northampton Saints	13	22	0.59	
2004–05	Tom Voyce	England	Wasps^{§}	12	24	0.50	
2005–06	Tom Varndell	England	Leicester Tigers	14	21	0.66	
2006–07	David Lemi	Samoa	Bristol	11	18	0.61	
2007–08	Tom Varndell (2)	England	Leicester Tigers	14	22	0.63	
2008–09	Joe Maddock	New Zealand	Bath	11	19	0.58	
2009–10	Chris Ashton	England	Northampton Saints	16	20	0.80	
2010–11	Alesana Tuilagi	Samoa	Leicester Tigers	13	21	0.62	
2011–12	Rob Miller	England	Sale Sharks	10	21	0.48	
2012–13^{†}	Tom Varndell (3)	England	Wasps	13	20	0.65	
2012–13^{†}	Christian Wade	England	Wasps	13	20	0.65	
2013–14	Vereniki Goneva	Fiji	Leicester Tigers	12	18	0.67	
2014–15	Thomas Waldrom	England	Exeter Chiefs	16	22	0.72	
2015–16	Thomas Waldrom (2)	England	Exeter Chiefs	13	22	0.59	
2016–17	Christian Wade (2)	England	Wasps	17	23	0.74	
2017–18^{†}	Vereniki Goneva (2)	Fiji	Newcastle Falcons	13	19	0.68	
2017–18^{†}	Christian Wade (3)	England	Wasps	13	21	0.62	
2017–18^{†}	Josh Adams	Wales	Worcester Warriors	13	21	0.62	
2018–19^{†}	Cobus Reinach	South Africa	Northampton Saints	12	22	0.54	
2018–19^{†}	Denny Solomona	England	Sale Sharks	12	21	0.57	
2019–20^{†}	Ben Earl	England	Saracens/Bristol Bears	11	17	0.65	
2019–20^{†}	Ollie Thorley	England	Gloucester	11	16	0.69	
2020–21	Sam Simmonds	England	Exeter Chiefs	21	23	0.91	
2021–22	Max Malins	England	Saracens	16	14	1.14	
2022–23	Cadan Murley	England	Harlequins	15	18	0.80	
2023–24	Ollie Sleightholme	England	Northampton Saints^{§}	15	15	1.00	
2024–25^{†}	Gabriel Ibitoye	England	Bristol Bears	13	15	0.87	
2024–25^{†}	Ollie Hassell-Collins	England	Leicester Tigers	13	20	0.65	
2025-26	Noah Calouri	England	Saracens	18	13	1.38	
2025-26	Tommy Freeman	England	Northampton Saints	18	15	1.20	
Season	Player	Nationality	Club	Tries	Games	Rate	Ref(s)

=== By nationality ===
Nationality	Seasons won
England	27
Fiji; New Zealand; Samoa	2
South Africa; Wales	1

=== By club ===
Club	Seasons won
Wasps; Leicester Tigers	6
Sale Sharks	5
Northampton Saints	4
Exeter Chiefs; Bristol Bears	3
Bath; Saracens	2
Gloucester; Harlequins; Newcastle Falcons; Richmond; Worcester Warriors	1

== See also ==
- Premiership Rugby Player of the Season
- Premiership Rugby Young Player of the Season
- Premiership Rugby Team of the Season
- Premiership Rugby Director of Rugby of the Season
