= Premiership Rugby Player of the Season =

English rugby union award

- Awarded for: The most outstanding player in each given Premiership Rugby season
- Sponsored by: Gallagher
- Country: England
- Presented by: Premiership Rugby
- First award: 1997–98
- Currently held by: Tom Willis

Highlights
- Most awards: Chris Robshaw (2)
- Most team wins: Leicester Tigers (6)
- Most consecutive team wins: Leicester Tigers (3)

The Premiership Rugby Player of the Season is an annual rugby union award presented to players in England, which recognises the most outstanding player in the Premiership each season.

Rugby union turned professional in 1995, and 1996–97 marked the first professional Premiership Rugby season. However, the Player of the Season award was only first bestowed during the 1997–98 season. The first Player of the Season award was given to Newcastle Falcons player Pat Lam, who won the Premiership Rugby title and scored five tries that season.

Chris Robshaw is the only player to have won the award more than once, winning in the 2008–09 and 2011–12 seasons. Vereniki Goneva and Sam Simmonds are the only players to have won the Player of the Season award whilst also being the leading try-scorer in the league. Henry Slade is the only player to have won the award whilst being the leading point-scorer in the league.

Following the 2024–25 season, the award was presented as part of The Rugby Awards, joining Premiership Rugby, the Rugby Players' Association (RPA), Premiership Women's Rugby (PWR) and the Rugby Football Union (RFU). A shortlist is chosen by a panel consisting of members of the RPA and the media, and the recipient is chosen by the public.

The current holder of the award is Saracens' Tom Willis.

== Winners ==
Key
Player (X)	Name of the player and number of times they had won the award at that point (if more than one)
†	Indicates player also scored the most points in the same season
‡	Indicates player also scored the most tries in the same season
§	Denotes the club were Premiership Rugby champions in the same season

Premiership Rugby Player of the Season winners
Season	Player	Position	Nationality	Club	Ref(s)
1997–98	Pat Lam	Number 8	Samoa	Newcastle Falcons^{§}	
1998–99	Martin Johnson	Lock	England	Leicester Tigers^{§}	
1999–2000	Austin Healey	Scrum half	England	Leicester Tigers^{§}	
2000–01	Pat Howard	Centre	Australia	Leicester Tigers^{§}	
2001–02	Jason Robinson	Wing	England	Sale Sharks	
2002–03	Jake Boer	Flanker	South Africa	Gloucester	
2003–04	Simon Shaw	Lock	England	London Wasps^{§}	
2004–05	Martin Corry	Number 8	England	Leicester Tigers	
2005–06	Mike Catt	Centre	England	London Irish	
2006–07	Martín Castrogiovanni	Prop	Italy	Leicester Tigers^{§}	
2007–08	James Simpson-Daniel	Wing	England	Gloucester	
2008–09	Chris Robshaw (1)	Flanker	England	Harlequins	
2009–10	Chris Ashton	Wing	England	Northampton Saints	
2010–11	Tom Wood	Flanker	England	Northampton Saints	
2011–12	Chris Robshaw (2)	Flanker	England	Harlequins^{§}	
2012–13	Tom Youngs	Hooker	England	Leicester Tigers^{§}	
2013–14	Mike Brown	Full-back	England	Harlequins	
2014–15	George Ford	Fly-half	England	Bath	
2015–16	Alex Goode	Full-back	England	Saracens^{§}	
2016–17	Jimmy Gopperth	Fly-half	New Zealand	Wasps	
2017–18	Vereniki Goneva‡	Wing	Fiji	Newcastle Falcons	
2018–19	Danny Cipriani	Fly-half	England	Gloucester	
2019–20	Jack Willis	Flanker	England	Wasps	
2020–21	Sam Simmonds‡	Number 8	England	Exeter Chiefs	
2021–22	Ben Earl	Flanker	England	Saracens	
2022–23	Ollie Lawrence	Centre	England	Bath	
2023–24	Henry Slade†	Centre	England	Exeter Chiefs	
2024–25	Tomos Williams	Scrum half	Wales	Gloucester	
2025–26	Tom Willis	Number 8	England	Saracens	

== Multiple awards won by players ==
The following table lists the number of awards won by players who have won at least two Player of the Season awards.

Players in bold are still active in the Premiership Rugby.

Awards	Player	Country	Seasons
2	Chris Robshaw	England	2008–09, 2011–12

== Awards won by nationality ==
Country	Players	Total
England	21	22
Samoa	1	1
Australia	1	1
South Africa	1	1
Italy	1	1
New Zealand	1	1
Fiji	1	1
Wales	1	1

== Awards won by position ==
Position	Players	Total
Flanker	5	6
Wing	4	4
Centre	4	4
Number 8	4	4
Fly-half	3	3
Full-back	2	2
Lock	2	2
Scrum half	2	2
Prop	1	1
Hooker	1	1

== Awards won by club ==
Club	Players	Total
Leicester Tigers	6	6
Gloucester	4	4
Wasps	3	3
Saracens	3	3
Harlequins	2	3
Northampton Saints	2	2
Newcastle Falcons	2	2
Bath	2	2
Exeter Chiefs	2	2
Sale Sharks	1	1
London Irish	1	1

== See also ==
- Premiership Rugby Young Player of the Season
- Premiership Rugby top scorers
- Premiership Rugby Team of the Season
- Premiership Rugby Director of Rugby of the Season
