= Premiership Rugby Director of Rugby of the Season =

English rugby union award

- Awarded for: The most outstanding director of rugby in each given Premiership Rugby season
- Sponsored by: London Pride
- Country: England
- Presented by: Premiership Rugby
- First award: 1998–99
- Currently held by: Phil Dowson (Northampton Saints)

Highlights
- Most awards: Mark McCall (5)
- Most team wins: Leicester Tigers and Saracens (5)

The Premiership Rugby Director of Rugby of the Season is an annual rugby union award presented to coaches in England, which recognises the most outstanding director of rugby in the Premiership each season.

The first Director of Rugby of the Season award was given to Northampton Saints coach Ian McGeechan as part of the 1998–99 end of season awards.

Mark McCall has won the award a record five times, all with Saracens. Rob Baxter is the only other coach to have won the award more than once.

Following the 2024–25 season, the award was presented as part of The Rugby Awards, joining Premiership Rugby, the Rugby Players' Association (RPA), Premiership Women's Rugby (PWR) and the Rugby Football Union (RFU). A shortlist is chosen by a panel consisting of members of the RPA and the media, and the recipient is chosen by the public.

The current holder of the award is Northampton Saints' Phil Dowson.

== Winners ==
Key
| Director of rugby (X) | Name of the director or rugby and number of times they had won the award at that point (if more than one) |
| § | Denotes the club were Premiership Rugby champions in the same season |

Premiership Rugby Director of Rugby of the Season winners
| Season | Director of rugby | Nationality | Club | Ref(s) |
|---|---|---|---|---|
| 1998–99 | Ian McGeechan | Scotland | Northampton Saints | |
| 1999–2000 | Andy Robinson | England | Bath | |
| 2000–01 | Dean Richards | England | Leicester Tigers^{§} | |
| 2001–02 | Conor O'Shea | Ireland | London Irish | |
| 2001–02 | Brendan Venter | South Africa | London Irish | |
| 2002–03 | Warren Gatland | New Zealand | Wasps^{§} | |
| 2003–04 | John Connolly | Australia | Bath | |
| 2004–05 | John Wells | England | Leicester Tigers | |
| 2005–06 | Philippe Saint-André | France | Sale Sharks^{§} | |
| 2006–07 | Pat Howard | Australia | Leicester Tigers^{§} | |
| 2007–08 | Dean Ryan | England | Gloucester | |
| 2008–09 | Richard Cockerill | England | Leicester Tigers^{§} | |
| 2009–10 | Andy Key | England | Leeds | |
| 2010–11 | Jim Mallinder | England | Northampton Saints | |
| 2011–12 | Rob Baxter | England | Exeter Chiefs | |
| 2012–13 | Mark McCall | Ireland | Saracens | |
| 2013–14 | Mark McCall (2) | Ireland | Saracens | |
| 2014–15 | Mike Ford | England | Bath | |
| 2015–16 | Mark McCall (3) | Ireland | Saracens^{§} | |
| 2016–17 | Dai Young | Wales | Wasps | |
| 2017–18 | Dean Richards (2) | England | Newcastle | |
| 2018–19 | Mark McCall (4) | Ireland | Saracens^{§} | |
| 2019–20 | Rob Baxter (2) | England | Exeter Chiefs^{§} | |
| 2020–21 | Pat Lam | Samoa | Bristol Bears | |
| 2021–22 | Steve Borthwick | England | Leicester Tigers^{§} | |
| 2022–23 | Mark McCall (5) | Ireland | Saracens^{§} | |
| 2023–24 | Phil Dowson | England | Northampton Saints^{§} | |
| 2024–25 | Johann van Graan | South Africa | Bath^{§} | |
| 2025–26 | Phil Dowson (2) | England | Northampton Saints | |

== Multiple award winners ==
The following table lists the number of awards won by directors of rugby who have won at least two Director of Rugby of the Season awards.

| Awards | Director of rugby | Country | Seasons |
|---|---|---|---|
| 5 | Mark McCall | Ireland | 2012–13, 2013–14, 2015–16, 2018–19, 2022–23 |
| 2 | Rob Baxter | England | 2011–12, 2019–20 |
| 2 | Phil Dowson | England | 2023–24, 2025–26 |

== Awards won by nationality ==
| Country | Directors of rugby | Total |
|---|---|---|
| England | 12 | 14 |
| Ireland | 2 | 6 |
| Australia | 2 | 2 |
| South Africa | 2 | 2 |
| Scotland | 1 | 1 |
| New Zealand | 1 | 1 |
| France | 1 | 1 |
| Wales | 1 | 1 |
| Samoa | 1 | 1 |

== Awards won by club ==
| Club | Directors of rugby | Total |
|---|---|---|
| Leicester Tigers | 5 | 5 |
| Saracens | 1 | 5 |
| Bath | 4 | 4 |
| Northampton Saints | 3 | 4 |
| Wasps | 2 | 2 |
| Exeter Chiefs | 1 | 2 |
| London Irish | 2 | 1 |
| Sale Sharks | 1 | 1 |
| Gloucester | 1 | 1 |
| Leeds | 1 | 1 |
| Newcastle | 1 | 1 |
| Bristol Bears | 1 | 1 |

== See also ==
- Premiership Rugby Player of the Season
- Premiership Rugby Young Player of the Season
- Premiership Rugby top scorers
- Premiership Rugby Team of the Season
