= Premiership Rugby Young Player of the Season =

English rugby union award

- Awarded for: The most outstanding young player in each given Premiership Rugby season
- Sponsored by: Defender, Gallagher
- Country: England
- Presented by: Premiership Rugby
- First award: 1998
- Currently held by: Noah Caluori

Highlights
- Most awards: Iain Balshaw (2)
- Most team wins: Leicester Tigers (6)
- Most consecutive team wins: Bath, Leicester Tigers (2)

The Premiership Rugby Young Player of the Season, also known as the Breakthrough Player of the Season, is an annual rugby union award presented to players in England, which recognises the most outstanding young player in the Premiership each season.

Rugby union turned professional in 1995, and 1996–97 marked the first professional Premiership Rugby season. However, the Young Player of the Season award was only first bestowed during the 1998–99 season. The first Young Player of the Season award was given to Newcastle Falcons player Jonny Wilkinson.

Iain Balshaw is the only player to have won the award more than once, winning back-to-back in the 1999–2000 and 2000–01 seasons.

The nominees of the award must be 23 or younger at the start of the season. The award is presented by the Rugby Players' Association (RPA), and is voted on by the players themselves. The trophy is named after Nick Duncombe, a Harlequins and England scrum-half who tragically died in 2003 from a rare form of blood poisoning at just 21 years old.

The current holder of the award is Saracens' Noah Caluori.

== Winners ==
Key
Player (X)	Name of the player and number of times they had won the award at that point (if more than one)
†	Indicates player also scored the most points in the same season
‡	Indicates player also scored the most tries in the same season
§	Denotes the club were Premiership Rugby champions in the same season

Premiership Rugby Young Player of the Season winners
Season	Player	Position	Nationality	Club	Ref(s)
1998–99	Jonny Wilkinson	Fly-half	England	Newcastle Falcons	
1999–2000	Iain Balshaw‡ (1)	Wing	England	Bath	
2000–01	Iain Balshaw (2)	Wing	England	Bath	
2001–02	Lewis Moody	Flanker	England	Leicester Tigers^{§}	
2002–03	James Forrester	Number 8	England	Gloucester	
2003–04	Olly Barkley	Fly-half	England	Bath	
2004–05	Ollie Smith	Centre	England	Leicester Tigers	
2005–06	Tom Varndell‡	Wing	England	Leicester Tigers	
2006–07	Tom Rees	Flanker	England	Wasps	
2007–08	Danny Cipriani	Fly-half	England	Wasps^{§}	
2008–09	Jordan Turner-Hall	Centre	England	Harlequins	
2009–10	Ben Youngs	Scrum half	England	Leicester Tigers^{§}	
2010–11	Manu Tuilagi	Centre	England	Leicester Tigers	
2011–12	Owen Farrell	Fly-half	England	Saracens	
2012–13	Joe Launchbury	Lock	England	Wasps	
2013–14	Billy Vunipola	Number 8	England	Saracens	
2014–15	Henry Slade	Centre	England	Exeter Chiefs	
2015–16	Maro Itoje	Lock	England	Saracens^{§}	
2016–17	Ellis Genge	Prop	England	Leicester Tigers	
2017–18	Sam Simmonds	Number 8	England	Exeter Chiefs	
2018–19	Tom Curry	Flanker	England	Sale Sharks	
2019–20	Jack Willis	Flanker	England	Wasps	
2020–21	Ioan Lloyd	Fly-half	Wales	Bristol Bears	
2021–22	Henry Arundell	Wing	England	London Irish	
2022–23	Tom Pearson	Flanker	England	London Irish	
2023–24	Immanuel Feyi-Waboso	Wing	England	Exeter Chiefs	
2024–25	Henry Pollock	Flanker	England	Northampton Saints	
2025–26	Noah Caluori‡	Wing	England	Saracens	

== Multiple awards won by players ==
The following table lists the number of awards won by players who have won at least two Player of the Season awards.

Players in bold are still active in the Premiership Rugby.

Awards	Player	Country	Seasons
2	Iain Balshaw	England	1999–2000, 2000–01

== Awards won by nationality ==
Country	Players	Total
England	26	27
Wales	1	1

== Awards won by position ==
Position	Players	Total
Flanker	6	6
Fly-half	5	5
Wing	5	6
Centre	4	4
Number 8	3	3
Lock	2	2
Scrum half	1	1
Prop	1	1

== Awards won by club ==
Club	Players	Total
Leicester Tigers	6	6
Wasps	4	4
Saracens	4	4
Exeter Chiefs	3	3
Bath	2	3
London Irish	2	2
Newcastle Falcons	1	1
Gloucester	1	1
Harlequins	1	1
Bristol Bears	1	1
Sale Sharks	1	1
Northampton Saints	1	1

== See also ==
- Premiership Rugby Player of the Season
- Premiership Rugby top scorers
- Premiership Rugby Team of the Season
- Premiership Rugby Director of Rugby of the Season
