= Ben Earl =

England international rugby union player

- Full name: Benjamin Arthur Earl
- Born: 7 January 1998 (age 28) Redhill, England
- Height: 1.83 m (6 ft 0 in)
- Weight: 107 kg (236 lb; 16 st 12 lb)
- School: Tonbridge School
- University: Queen Mary University of London
- Notable relative: Belinda Earl (mother)

Rugby union career
- Position(s): Flanker, Number 8, Centre
- Current team: Saracens
Senior career
Years	Team	Apps	(Points)
2016–	Saracens	158	(230)
2020–2021	→ Bristol Bears (loan)	22	(55)
- Correct as of 18 July 2026
International career
Years	Team	Apps	(Points)
2016	England U18	5	(10)
2017–2018	England U20	9	(20)
2020–	England	56	(60)
2025	British & Irish Lions	2	(0)
- Correct as of 14 November 2026

Benjamin Arthur Earl (born 7 January 1998) is an English professional rugby union player who plays as a flanker and number 8 for Premiership Rugby club Saracens and the England national team.

== Early life ==
Earl's mother, Belinda Earl, worked as a retail industry CEO and his father as a solicitor. Earl attended The New Beacon and Tonbridge School.

At school level, Earl played much more cricket than rugby; he was an all-rounder and played for Kent until he was 15. He also was a serious competitive swimmer until he was 13. Earl has said he was overweight until age 17. He studied comparative literature at Queen Mary University.

== Club career ==
Earl started his playing career at Sevenoaks RFC and came through the Saracens academy. He has stated that he prefers the freedom of playing flanker, but also plays Number 8. In November 2016, Earl made his club debut against Gloucester in the Anglo-Welsh Cup and the following season he scored a try on his first Premiership start against Exeter Chiefs. He also started for the Saracens side that lost to Northampton Saints in the 2019 Premiership Rugby Cup final.

In 2020, Earl agreed a new contract with Saracens and, after it was confirmed the club would be relegated for the 2020–21 campaign, he joined Bristol Bears on a season-long loan along with teammate Max Malins. During his loan spell, he started for Bristol in the final of the EPCR Challenge Cup as they defeated Toulon to win their first ever European trophy.

On his return to Saracens, Earl scored a hat-trick in their semi-final victory over Harlequins. He then started in the 2022 final, which they lost against Leicester Tigers to finish runners up. His performances during the campaign led to him being named Player of the Season. The following season, Earl helped Saracens win the Premiership, starting in the 2023 final as they defeated Sale Sharks to regain their league title.

In May 2024, following an impressive season, Earl was named in the Premiership Team of the Season for the 2023–24 campaign.

== International career ==
Earl represented England at under-16 and under-18 level. He was a member of the England under-20 team that completed a Grand Slam during the 2017 Six Nations Under 20s Championship and scored a try during the opening round against France. He was selected for the 2017 World Rugby Under 20 Championship and scored a try in the final as England finished runners up to New Zealand. The following year Earl captained the team as they finished runners up in the 2018 Six Nations Under 20s Championship and he scored a try in the final round against Ireland.

In May 2018, Earl received his first call-up by coach Eddie Jones to the senior squad for their tour of South Africa, and he was subsequently selected for the 2019 Six Nations Championship. Earl was called up again for the 2020 Six Nations Championship and, on 8 February 2020, he made his Test debut off the bench as a replacement for Sam Underhill against Scotland at Murrayfield. He subsequently played in the final round of the tournament as England won away against Italy to win the competition. Later that year, Earl came off the bench as England defeated France in extra-time to win the Autumn Nations Cup.

Earl was included in the squad for the 2023 Rugby World Cup. He started in their quarter-final victory over Fiji and semi-final elimination against champions South Africa. In their last game of the tournament, Earl scored his first try at international level as England defeated Argentina to finish third with the bronze medal.

Earl was retained for the 2024 Six Nations Championship and scored tries in home victories against Wales and Ireland. He made a total of 73 carries throughout the competition, more than any other player in that campaign and the most by any Englishman since the 2016 tournament. These performances led to his inclusion in the Team of the Championship. Earl was also nominated for Player of the Championship, with that accolade ultimately awarded to Tommaso Menoncello. At the end of the season, Earl was voted by his teammates as the England Men's Player of the Year at the 2024 RPA Awards.

=== List of international tries ===
as of 14 November 2026

No.	Date	Venue	Opponent	Score	Result	Competition
1	27 October 2023	Stade de France, Saint-Denis, France	Argentina	8–0	26–23	2023 Rugby World Cup
2	10 February 2024	Twickenham Stadium, London, England	Wales	5–7	16–14	2024 Six Nations Championship
3	9 March 2024	Twickenham Stadium, London, England	Ireland	18–17	23–22	2024 Six Nations Championship
4	22 June 2024	National Stadium, Tokyo, Japan	Japan	38–3	52–17	2024 Summer International
5	24 November 2024	Twickenham Stadium, London, England	Japan	5–0	59–14	2024 Autumn International
6	9 March 2025	Twickenham Stadium, London, England	Italy	47–24	47–24	2025 Six Nations Championship
7	1 November 2025	Twickenham Stadium, London, England	Australia	8–0	25–7	2025 Autumn International
8	7 February 2026	Twickenham Stadium, London, England	Wales	20–0	48–7	2026 Six Nations Championship
9	14 February 2026	Murrayfield Stadium, Edinburgh, Scotland	Scotland	18–31	20–31	2026 Six Nations Championship
10	18 July 2026	Estadio Único Madre de Ciudades, Santiago del Estero, Argentina	Argentina	10–0	31–24	2026 Nations Championship
11	18 July 2026	Estadio Único Madre de Ciudades, Santiago del Estero, Argentina	Argentina	17–3	31–24	2026 Nations Championship
12	14 November 2026	Twickenham Stadium, London, England	Japan	47–10	78–15	2026 Nations Championship

== Honours ==
England

- 1× Six Nations: 2020
- 1× Autumn Nations Cup: 2020
- 1× Rugby World Cup third place: 2023

Saracens

- 1x European Rugby Champions Cup: 2018–19
- 3× Premiership Rugby: 2017–18, 2018–19, 2022–23

Bristol Bears

- 1× European Rugby Challenge Cup: 2019–20

Individual

- 1× Six Nations Team of the Championship: 2024
- 1× Six Nations Player of the Championship runner-up: 2024
- 1x England Men's Player of the Year: 2024
- 1× Premiership Player of the Season: 2021–22
- 1× Premiership Player of the Season runner-up: 2019–20
- 1× Premiership Discovery of the Season runner-up: 2019–20
- 1× Premiership top try scorer (tied): 2019–20
- 4× Premiership Team of the Season: 2019–20, 2021–22, 2022–23, 2023–24
