= Steve Hanley =

Steve Hanley may refer to:

- Steve Hanley (musician) (born 1959), Irish-born English musician, long term bassist with The Fall
- Steve Hanley (rugby union) (born 1979), English rugby union player
