= 2002–03 Premiership Rugby =

Rugby union competition in England

2002-2003 Zurich Premiership
- Countries: England
- Champions: London Wasps (3rd title)
- Runners-up: Gloucester
- Relegated: Bristol Shoguns
- Matches played: 139
- Attendance: 1,183,972 (average 8,518 per match)

The 2002-03 Zurich Premiership was the 16th season of the top flight of the English domestic rugby union competitions.

The Zurich Championship which had been competed for in seasons 2000–01 and 2001–02 was dropped from this season.

== Participating teams ==
Locations of the 2002-03 Zurich Premiership teams

Team	Stadium	Capacity	City/Area
Bath	Recreation Ground	8,200	Bath, Somerset
Bristol Shoguns	Memorial Stadium (Note: Bristol Shoguns would also play a home game at Ashton Gate in Bristol on 4 May 2003)	8,500 (1,200 seats)	Bristol
Gloucester	Kingsholm	11,000	Gloucester, Gloucestershire
Harlequins	The Stoop	9,000 (2,000 seats)	Twickenham, London
Leeds Tykes	Headingley Stadium	22,250	Leeds, West Yorkshire
Leicester Tigers	Welford Road	16,815	Leicester, Leicestershire
London Irish	Madejski Stadium	24,161	Reading, Berkshire
London Wasps	Adams Park	10,000	High Wycombe, Buckinghamshire
Newcastle Falcons	Kingston Park	9,800 (Note: Kingston Park capacity up from 8,000 to around 9,800 for the 2003-04 season, due to ground redevelopment including a 3,800 seater stand.)	Newcastle upon Tyne, Tyne and Wear
Northampton Saints	Franklin's Gardens	12,500	Northampton, Northamptonshire
Sale	Heywood Road	5,800 (Note: Heywood Road capacity up from 4,800 to 5,800 for the 2003-04 season with a capacity crowd achieved on two occasions.)	Sale, Greater Manchester
Saracens	Vicarage Road	22,000	Watford, Hertfordshire

== Table ==
Pos	Team	Pld	W	D	L	PF	PA	PD	TF	TA	TB	LB	Pts	Qualification
1	Gloucester (F)	22	17	2	3	617	396	+221	67	35	7	3	82	Playoff place
2	London Wasps (C)	22	13	2	7	553	460	+93	55	36	6	5	67	Playoff place
3	Northampton Saints (SF)	22	13	0	9	512	376	+136	52	24	5	5	62	Playoff place
4	Sale Sharks	22	12	2	8	556	470	+86	61	46	8	2	62	2003–04 Heineken Cup
5	Leeds Tykes (Note: Wasps won the 2002–03 Parker Pen Challenge Cup therefore automatically qualifying for the 2003–04 Heineken Cup. With Leicester Tigers winning the Zurich Wildcard Final, the final 2003–04 Heineken Cup berth was awarded to Leeds Tykes, placed fifth in the league.)	22	12	2	8	478	435	+43	38	39	1	5	58	2003–04 Heineken Cup
6	Leicester Tigers	22	12	0	10	448	396	+52	44	32	4	3	55	2003–04 Heineken Cup
7	Harlequins	22	9	0	13	461	560	−99	43	60	3	5	44	
8	Saracens	22	8	0	14	499	587	−88	49	61	5	5	42	
9	London Irish	22	8	1	13	432	485	−53	32	46	2	4	40	
10	Newcastle Falcons	22	8	0	14	388	545	−157	31	58	3	5	40	
11	Bath	22	7	2	13	385	490	−105	33	44	1	3	36	
12	Bristol Shoguns (R)	22	7	1	14	504	633	−129	47	71	3	3	36	Relegation place

Source: Guinness Premiership

== Results ==
=== Week 1 ===
30 August 2002
19:45

Sale Sharks	24 – 21	Northampton Saints

Heywood Road
Attendance: 5,313

31 August 2002
14:00

Leeds Tykes	26 – 13	Leicester Tigers

Headingley
Attendance: 4,301

31 August 2002
15:00

NEC Harlequins	19 – 25	Gloucester

Twickenham Stoop
Attendance: 7,015

1 September 2002
14:30

Newcastle Falcons	24 – 17	London Wasps

Kingston Park
Attendance: 5,263

1 September 2002
15:00

Bristol Shoguns	30 – 45	Saracens

Memorial Stadium
Attendance: 4,761

1 September 2002
15:00

London Irish	22 – 24	Bath

Madejski Stadium
Attendance: 9,203

=== Week 2 ===
7 September 2002
14:00

Northampton Saints	31 – 13	Newcastle Falcons

Franklin's Gardens
Attendance: 10,213

7 September 2002
15:00

Gloucester	44 – 8	Sale Sharks

Kingsholm
Attendance: 9,544

7 September 2002
15:00

Leicester Tigers	30 – 6	Harlequins

Welford Road
Attendance: 15,387

8 September 2002
14:30

Leeds Tykes	41 – 16	London Irish

Headingley
Attendance: 3,190

8 September 2002
15:00

London Wasps	38 – 35	Bristol Shoguns

Adams Park
Attendance: 7,171

8 September 2002
15:00

Saracens	28 – 3	Bath

Vicarage Road
Attendance: 10,068

=== Week 3 ===
13 September 2002
19:45

Sale Sharks	29 – 16	Leicester Tigers

Heywood Road
Attendance: 5,678

14 September 2002
14:00

Bath Rugby	27 – 27	London Wasps

Recreation Ground
Attendance: 8,200

14 September 2002
15:00

NEC Harlequins	23 – 33	Leeds Tykes

Twickenham Stoop
Attendance: 5,352

15 September 2002
14:30

Newcastle Falcons	19 – 22	Gloucester

Kingston Park
Attendance: 5,304

15 September 2002
15:00

Bristol Shoguns	28 – 36	Northampton Saints

Memorial Stadium
Attendance: 4,674

15 September 2002
15:00

London Irish	32 – 10	Saracens

Madejski Stadium
Attendance: 7,177

=== Week 4 ===
20 September 2002
20:00

Leeds Tykes	29 – 29	Sale Sharks

Headingley
Attendance: 5,123

21 September 2002
14:00

Gloucester	45 – 18	Bristol Shoguns

Kingsholm
Attendance: 10,117

21 September 2002
15:00

Leicester Tigers	52 – 9	Newcastle Falcons

Welford Road
Attendance: 15,656

21 September 2002
15:00

NEC Harlequins	29 – 19	London Irish

Twickenham Stoop
Attendance: 7,223

21 September 2002
15:00

Northampton Saints	24 – 3	Bath

Franklin's Gardens
Attendance: 9,560

22 September 2002
15:00

London Wasps	51 – 23	Saracens

Adams Park
Attendance: 8,512

=== Week 5 ===
27 September 2002
19:45

Sale Sharks	20 – 16	Harlequins

Heywood Road
Attendance: 5,613

28 September 2002
14:00

Saracens	31 – 19	Northampton Saints

Vicarage Road
Attendance: 6,289

28 September 2002
14:15

Bath Rugby	21 – 21	Gloucester

Recreation Ground
Attendance: 8,200

29 September 2002
14:30

Newcastle Falcons	27 – 20	Leeds Tykes

Kingston Park
Attendance: 5,457

29 September 2002
15:00

Bristol Shoguns	25 – 20	Leicester Tigers

Memorial Stadium
Attendance: 6,237

29 September 2002
15:00

London Irish	21 – 31	London Wasps

Madejski Stadium
Attendance: 9,267

=== Week 6 ===
5 October 2002
14:00

Sale Sharks	36 – 14	London Irish

Heywood Road
Attendance: 4,514

5 October 2002
15:00

Gloucester	44 – 14	Saracens

Kingsholm
Attendance: 10,439

5 October 2002
15:00

Leicester Tigers	22 – 20	Bath

Welford Road
Attendance: 16,811

5 October 2002
15:00

NEC Harlequins	47 – 23	Newcastle Falcons

Twickenham Stoop
Attendance: 7,923

5 October 2002
15:00

Northampton Saints	34 – 20	London Wasps

Franklin's Gardens
Attendance: 9,888

6 October 2002
14:30

Leeds Tykes	25 – 13	Bristol Shoguns

Headingley
Attendance: 4,420

=== Week 7 ===
26 October 2002
14:00

London Wasps	23 – 16	Gloucester

Adams Park
Attendance: 8,768

26 October 2002
14:15

Bath Rugby	20 – 22	Leeds Tykes

Recreation Ground
Attendance: 8,200

27 October 2002
14:30

Newcastle Falcons	31 – 20	Sale Sharks

Kingston Park
Attendance: 4,245

27 October 2002
15:00

London Irish	12 – 14	Northampton Saints

Madejski Stadium
Attendance: 7,579

27 October 2002
15:00

Saracens	18 – 26	Leicester Tigers

Vicarage Road
Attendance: 10,531

=== Week 8 ===
1 November 2002
19:45

Sale Sharks	28 – 14	Bristol Shoguns

Heywood Road
Attendance: 4,688

2 November 2002
14:00

NEC Harlequins	18 – 9	Bath

Twickenham Stoop
Attendance: 8,311

2 November 2002
15:00

Gloucester	18 – 9	Northampton Saints

Kingsholm
Attendance: 11,000

2 November 2002
15:00

Leicester Tigers	9 – 6	London Wasps

Welford Road
Attendance: 16,845

3 November 2002
14:30

Leeds Tykes	27 – 18	Saracens

Headingley
Attendance: 5,015

3 November 2002
14:30

Newcastle Falcons	16 – 24	London Irish

Kingston Park
Attendance: 4,515

=== Week 9 ===
9 November 2002
12:00

Northampton Saints	3 – 16	Leicester Tigers

Franklin's Gardens
Attendance: 12,600

10 November 2002
14:15

Bath Rugby	24 – 18	Sale Sharks

Recreation Ground
Attendance: 7,430

10 November 2002
14:30

London Irish	19 – 40	Gloucester

Madejski Stadium
Attendance: 8,449

10 November 2002
15:00

Bristol Shoguns	38 – 10	Newcastle Falcons

Memorial Stadium
Attendance: 4,342

10 November 2002
15:00

London Wasps	27 – 27	Leeds Tykes

Adams Park
Attendance: 4,475

10 November 2002
15:00

Saracens	36 – 30	Harlequins

Vicarage Road
Attendance: 6,634

=== Week 10 ===
15 November 2002
19:45

Leicester Tigers	20 – 15	Gloucester

Welford Road
Attendance: 16,845

15 November 2002
19:45

Sale Sharks	37 – 26	Saracens

Heywood Road
Attendance: 5,196

17 November 2002
14:30

Leeds Tykes	26 – 19	Northampton Saints

Headingley
Attendance: 4,017

17 November 2002
14:30

Newcastle Falcons	20 – 24	Bath

Kingston Park
Attendance: 4,532

17 November 2002
15:00

Bristol Shoguns	32 – 32	London Irish

Memorial Stadium
Attendance: 5,005

17 November 2002
15:00

NEC Harlequins	27 – 14	London Wasps

Twickenham Stoop
Attendance: 7,252

=== Week 11 ===
23 November 2002
12:00

Northampton Saints	35 – 7	Harlequins

Franklin's Gardens
Attendance: 8,296

24 November 2002
14:15

Bath Rugby	19 – 30	Bristol Shoguns

Recreation Ground
Attendance: 8,200

24 November 2002
14:30

Gloucester	28 – 10	Leeds Tykes

Kingsholm
Attendance: 10,276

24 November 2002
15:00

London Irish	27 – 7	Leicester Tigers

Madejski Stadium
Attendance: 10,605

24 November 2002
15:00

London Wasps	25 – 32	Sale Sharks

Adams Park
Attendance: 5,242

24 November 2002
15:00

Saracens	17 – 13	Newcastle Falcons

Vicarage Road
Attendance: 5,742

=== Week 12 ===
29 November 2002
19:45

Sale Sharks	36 – 18	Bath

Heywood Road
Attendance: 5,700

30 November 2002
15:00

Gloucester	25 – 20	London Irish

Kingsholm
Attendance: 10,217

30 November 2002
15:00

NEC Harlequins	36 – 32	Saracens

Twickenham Stoop
Attendance: 7,714

30 November 2002
17:35

Leicester Tigers	12 – 25	Northampton Saints

Welford Road
Attendance: 16,875

1 December 2002
14:30

Leeds Tykes	15 – 18	London Wasps

Headingley
Attendance: 4,751

1 December 2002
14:30

Newcastle Falcons	12 – 20	Bristol Shoguns

Kingston Park
Attendance: 3,273

=== Week 13 ===
27 December 2002
15:00

London Wasps	26 – 13	Leicester Tigers

Adams Park
Attendance: 10,000

28 December 2002
14:15

Bath Rugby	23 – 9	Harlequins

Recreation Ground
Attendance: 8,200

28 December 2002
14:30

Northampton Saints	13 – 16	Gloucester

Franklin's Gardens
Attendance: 12,500

29 December 2002
15:00

Bristol Shoguns	18 – 6	Sale Sharks

Memorial Stadium
Attendance: 5,642

29 December 2002
15:00

London Irish	20 – 0	Newcastle Falcons

Madejski Stadium
Attendance: 10,877

29 December 2002
15:00

Saracens	11 – 6	Leeds Tykes

Vicarage Road
Attendance: 9,328

=== Week 14 ===
3 January 2003
19:00

Leeds Tykes	20 – 7	Bath

Headingley
Attendance: 4,553

3 January 2003
19:45

Sale Sharks	38 – 3	Newcastle Falcons

Heywood Road
Attendance: 5,678

4 January 2003
15:00

Gloucester	24 – 17	London Wasps

Kingsholm
Attendance: 11,000

4 January 2003
15:00

Leicester Tigers	23 – 18	Saracens

Welford Road
Attendance: 16,845

4 January 2003
15:00

NEC Harlequins	26 – 17	Bristol Shoguns

Twickenham Stoop
Attendance: 7,123

4 January 2003
15:00

Northampton Saints	10 – 22	London Irish

Franklin's Gardens
Attendance: 10,604

=== Week 15 ===
1 February 2003
14:00

Newcastle Falcons	32 – 17	Harlequins

Kingston Park
Attendance: 6,109

1 February 2003
14:15

Bath Rugby	8 – 15	Leicester Tigers

Recreation Ground
Attendance: 8,200

2 February 2003
15:00

Bristol Shoguns	12 – 17	Leeds Tykes

Memorial Stadium
Attendance: 5,032

2 February 2003
15:00

London Irish	11 – 23	Sale Sharks

Madejski Stadium
Attendance: 7,565

2 February 2003
15:00

London Wasps	16 – 9	Northampton Saints

Adams Park
Attendance: 9,400

2 February 2003
15:00

Saracens	22 – 29	Gloucester

Vicarage Road
Attendance: 9,089

=== Week 16 ===
7 February 2003
20:00

Leeds Tykes	12 – 17	Newcastle Falcons

Headingley
Attendance: 7,207

8 February 2003
14:00

Leicester Tigers	40 – 6	Bristol Shoguns

Welford Road
Attendance: 16,875

8 February 2003
15:00

Gloucester	29 – 16	Bath

Kingsholm
Attendance: 11,000

8 February 2003
15:00

NEC Harlequins	0 – 45	Sale Sharks

Twickenham Stoop
Attendance: 6,823

8 February 2003
15:00

Northampton Saints	34 – 25	Saracens

Franklin's Gardens
Attendance: 12,500

9 February 2003
15:00

London Wasps	35 – 11	London Irish

Adams Park
Attendance: 8,590

=== Week 17 ===
1 March 2003
14:15

Bath Rugby	30 – 9	Saracens

Recreation Ground
Attendance: 7,290

1 March 2003
15:00

London Wasps	13 – 12	Newcastle Falcons

Adams Park
Attendance: 6,199

2 March 2003
15:00

Bristol Shoguns	48 – 41	Harlequins

Memorial Stadium
Attendance: 5,205

=== Week 18 ===
15 March 2003
14:15

Bath Rugby	10 – 27	Northampton Saints

Recreation Ground
Attendance: 8,200

15 March 2003
14:30

Sale Sharks	32 – 20	Leeds Tykes

Heywood Road
Attendance: 5,700

16 March 2003
14:30

London Irish	6 – 16	Harlequins

Madejski Stadium
Attendance: 18,585

16 March 2003
14:30

Newcastle Falcons	24 – 22	Leicester Tigers

Kingston Park
Attendance: 9,105

16 March 2003
15:00

Bristol Shoguns	21 – 38	Gloucester

Memorial Stadium
Attendance: 10,693

16 March 2003
15:00

Saracens	31 – 42	London Wasps

Vicarage Road
Attendance: 8,912

=== Week 19 ===
4 April 2003
20:00

Leeds Tykes	23 – 22	Harlequins

Headingley
Attendance: 4,305

6 April 2003
15:00

London Wasps	36 – 17	Bath

Adams Park
Attendance: 8,231

6 April 2003
15:00

Saracens	12 – 14	London Irish

Vicarage Road
Attendance: 6,089

6 April 2003
16:45

Leicester Tigers	33 – 20	Sale Sharks

Welford Road
Attendance: 16,815

=== Week 20 ===
10 April 2003
20:00

Bath Rugby	18 – 15	London Irish

Recreation Ground
Attendance: 8,200

12 April 2003
15:00

Gloucester	25 – 23	Newcastle Falcons

Kingsholm
Attendance: 10,404

=== Week 21 ===
16 April 2003
20:00

Northampton Saints	43 – 13	Bristol Shoguns

Franklin's Gardens
Attendance: 8,805

18 April 2003
15:00

Sale Sharks	30 – 30	Gloucester

Heywood Road
Attendance: 5,800

19 April 2003
15:00

NEC Harlequins	17 – 9	Leicester Tigers

Twickenham Stoop
Attendance: 7,123

20 April 2003
15:00

Bristol Shoguns	19 – 34	London Wasps

Memorial Stadium
Attendance: 4,866

20 April 2003
15:00

London Irish	14 – 26	Leeds Tykes

Madejski Stadium
Attendance: 7,125

20 April 2003
15:00

Newcastle Falcons	22 – 20	Northampton Saints

Kingston Park
Attendance: 7,428

=== Week 22 ===
26 April 2003
15:00

Gloucester	29 – 11	Harlequins

Kingsholm
Attendance: 11,000

26 April 2003
15:00

Leicester Tigers	18 – 17	Leeds Tykes

Welford Road
Attendance: 16,815

26 April 2003
16:00

Northampton Saints	27 – 17	Sale Sharks

Franklin's Gardens
Attendance: 9,202

29 April 2003
19:30

Saracens	17 – 16	Bristol Shoguns

Vicarage Road
Attendance: 5,090

=== Week 23 ===
2 May 2003
19:45

NEC Harlequins	19 – 31	Northampton Saints

Twickenham Stoop
Attendance: 6,423

3 May 2003
14:00

Leicester Tigers	19 – 20	London Irish

Welford Road
Attendance: 16,815

3 May 2003
17:15

Sale Sharks	9 – 16	London Wasps

Heywood Road
Attendance: 5,800

4 May 2003
14:30

Leeds Tykes	30 – 23	Gloucester

Headingley
Attendance: 6,088

4 May 2003
15:00

Bristol Shoguns	30 – 20	Bath

Ashton Gate
Attendance: 20,793

4 May 2003
15:00

Newcastle Falcons	26 – 22	Saracens

Kingston Park
Attendance: 9,127

=== Week 24 ===
10 May 2003
15:00

Bath Rugby	24 – 12	Newcastle Falcons

Recreation Ground
Attendance: 8,200

10 May 2003
15:00

Gloucester	31 – 13	Leicester Tigers

Kingsholm
Attendance: 11,000

10 May 2003
15:00

London Irish	41 – 21	Bristol Shoguns

Madejski Stadium
Attendance: 12,696

10 May 2003
15:00

London Wasps	21 – 25	Harlequins

Adams Park
Attendance: 8,747

10 May 2003
15:00

Northampton Saints	28 – 6	Leeds Tykes

Franklin's Gardens
Attendance: 12,500

10 May 2003
15:00

Saracens	34 – 19	Sale Sharks

Vicarage Road
Attendance: 6,211

== Play-offs ==
=== Semi final ===
17 May 2003
18:00

London Wasps	19 – 10	Northampton Saints

Adams Park
Attendance: 7,398

=== Final ===
31 May 2003
15:30

Gloucester	3–39	London Wasps
Pen: Mercier (1/1) 4'	Report; Report	Try: Lewsey (2) 2' c, 40' c Worsley 71' c Con: King (3/3) 3', 40', 71'; Pen: King (4/4) 9', 12', 45', 53'; Drop: King (2) 19', 47'

Twickenham Stadium
Attendance: 42,000
Referee: Tony Spreadbury

Team details

Gloucester
London Wasps

FB	15	(South Africa) Thinus Delport
RW	14	(England) Marcel Garvey	(substituted off) 76'
OC	13	(Samoa) Terry Fanolua	(substituted off) 63'
IC	12	(England) Henry Paul
LW	11	(England) James Simpson-Daniel
FH	10	(France) Ludovic Mercier	(substituted off) 68'
SH	9	(England) Andy Gomarsall
N8	8	(Samoa) Junior Paramore	(substituted off) 53'
OF	7	(England) Andy Hazell
BF	6	(South Africa) Jake Boer
RL	5	(England) Mark Cornwell	(substituted off) 40'
LL	4	(England) Adam Eustace
TP	3	(England) Phil Vickery (c)
HK	2	(France) Olivier Azam
LP	1	(Argentina) Rodrigo Roncero
Substitutions:
HK	16	C. Collins
PR	17	(England) Andy Deacon
LK	18	(England) Rob Fidler	(substituted on) 40'
FL	19	(England) Pete Buxton	(substituted on) 53'
FH	20	(England) Simon Amor	(substituted on) 68'
CE	21	(New Zealand) Robert Todd	(substituted on) 63'
WG	22	(England) Clive Stuart-Smith	(substituted on) 76'
Coach:
(England) Nigel Melville

FB	15	(England) Mark Van Gisbergen
RW	14	(England) Josh Lewsey
OC	13	(England) Fraser Waters
IC	12	(England) Stuart Abbott	(substituted off) 69'
LW	11	(Scotland) Kenny Logan
FH	10	(England) Alex King
SH	9	(Wales) Rob Howley	(substituted off) 71'
N8	8	(England) Lawrence Dallaglio (c)
OF	7	(England) Paul Volley	(substituted off) 73'
BF	6	(England) Joe Worsley
RL	5	(England) Richard Birkett
LL	4	(England) Simon Shaw	(substituted off) 73'
TP	3	(England) Will Green
HK	2	(Samoa) Trevor Leota	(substituted off) 62'
LP	1	(New Zealand) Craig Dowd	(substituted off) 74'
Substitutions:
HK	16	(England) Phil Greening	(substituted on) 62'
PR	17	(England) Alistair McKenzie	(substituted on) 74'
LK	18	(England) Peter Scrivener	(substituted on) 73'
FL	19	(England) Mark Lock	(substituted on) 73'
SH	20	(England) Martyn Wood	(substituted on) 71'
CE	21	(England) Mark Denney	(substituted on) 69'
CE	22	(England) Ayoola Erinle
Coach:
(New Zealand) Warren Gatland

== Zurich Wildcard ==
Meanwhile, Leeds (5th place), Leicester (6th), Harlequins (7th), Saracens (8th) played for a Zurich Wildcard to the 2003–04 Heineken Cup:

=== Semi-finals ===
==== First leg ====
14 May 2003

Harlequins	26 – 23	Leicester Tigers
	Report

Twickenham Stoop
Attendance: 2,350
Referee: D Pearson

14 May 2003

Saracens	57 – 21	Leeds Tykes
	Report

Vicarage Road
Attendance: 2,900
Referee: Roy Maybank

==== Second leg ====
18 May 2003

Leicester Tigers	28– 13	Harlequins
	[ Report]

Welford Road
Attendance: 5,552

Leicester advanced to the wildcard final due to a superior aggregate score of 51–39

18 May 2003

Leeds Tykes	27 – 13	Saracens
	Report

Headingley
Attendance: 1,407
Referee: Tony Spreadbury

Saracens advanced to the wildcard final due to a superior aggregate score of 70–48

=== Final ===
31 May 2003

Leicester Tigers	27 – 20 (a.e.t.)	Saracens
	[ Report]

Franklin's Gardens
Attendance: 8,066

== Leading scorers ==
Note: Flags to the left of player names indicate national team as has been defined under World Rugby eligibility rules, or primary nationality for players who have not earned international senior caps. Players may hold one or more non-WR nationalities.

=== Most points ===
Rank	Player	Club	Points
1	(England) Alex King	Wasps	284
2	(France) Ludovic Mercier	Gloucester	258
3	(South Africa) Braam van Straaten	Leeds Tykes	252
4	(Ireland) Barry Everitt	London Irish	238
5	(England) Paul Grayson	Northampton Saints	213
6	(England) Jonny Wilkinson	Newcastle Falcons	205
7	(England) Andy Goode	Saracens	204
8	(Ireland) Paul Burke	Harlequins	188
9	(Argentina) Felipe Contepomi	Bristol	184
10	(England) Tim Stimpson	Leicester Tigers	161

=== Most tries ===
Rank	Player	Club	Tries
1	(England) Steve Hanley	Sale Sharks	14
2	(England) Josh Lewsey	Wasps	12
3	(England) Mark Cueto	Sale Sharks	11
4	(South Africa) Jake Boer	Gloucester	9
5	(England) Paul Sackey	London Irish	8
5	(England) Dan Scarbrough	Leeds Tykes	8
7	(England) Ben Cohen	Northampton Saints	7
7	(New Zealand) Brendon Daniel	Bristol	7
7	(England) James Forrester	Gloucester	7
7	(England) Jamie Noon	Newcastle Falcons	7
7	(England) Jason Robinson	Sale Sharks	7
