= Phil Dowson =

England international rugby union player

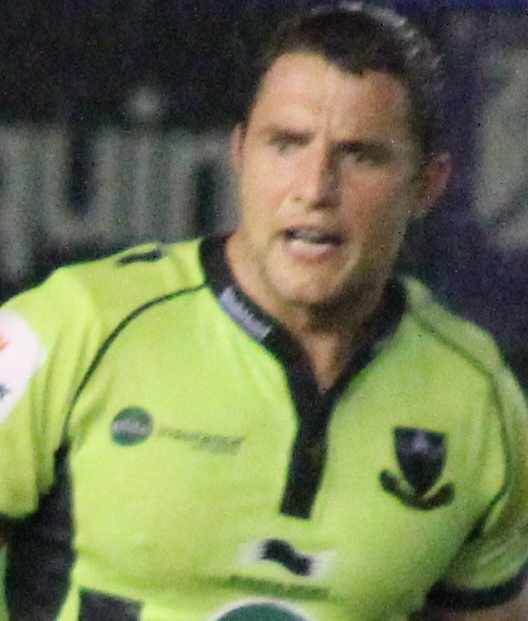
- Dowson in 2013
- Born: Philip David Acton Dowson; 1 October 1981 (age 45) Guildford, England
- Height: 6 ft 4 in (1.93 m)
- Weight: 108 kg (17 st 0 lb)
- School: Sedbergh School

Rugby union career
- Position(s): Number Eight, Flanker
Youth career
- Wigton
Senior career
Years	Team	Apps	(Points)
2001–2009	Newcastle Falcons	96	(45)
2009–2015	Northampton Saints	186	(140)
2015–2017	Worcester Warriors	37	(5)
International career
Years	Team	Apps	(Points)
2012	England	7	(0)
National sevens team
Years	Team		Comps
2005	England		Hong Kong
Coaching career
- Years: Team
- 2017–2018: Northampton Saints (assistant)
- 2018–2022: Northampton Saints (forwards)
- 2022–: Northampton Saints (Director of Rugby)

Phil Dowson (born 1 October 1981) is an English rugby union coach and former player. He is currently director of rugby at PREM Rugby club Northampton Saints.

He played for Worcester Warriors, Northampton Saints and Newcastle Falcons, as well as the England national team in a playing career spanning 16 seasons.

Dowson's position of choice was as a number 8 and he could also operate as a flanker.

== Club career ==
=== Newcastle Falcons ===
In 2004 he was a member of Falcons’ Powergen Cup winning side at Twickenham, scoring a try after coming on as a replacement in the final. Dowson made over 130 appearances for the Falcons and captained the side for two seasons.

=== Northampton Saints ===
Dowson signed for the Northampton Saints from the Newcastle Falcons in the summer of 2009.

In 2014 Dowson played as a replacement as Northampton beat Saracens to win the Premiership.

=== Worcester Warriors ===
He signed for Worcester Warriors having made over 180 appearances for the Saints, in the 2015-16 season in the Aviva Premiership.

On 20 February 2017, Dowson announced his retirement from professional competition at the end of the season, where he rejoined his former club Northampton Saints as an assistant coach.

== International career ==
Dowson represented the England Sevens team at the 2005 World Cup in Hong Kong. He was then selected for the 2005 Churchill Cup. He was called into the England Saxons side that defeated Ireland A on 1 February 2008.

Dowson represented England Saxons at the 2007 Churchill Cup and 2009 Churchill Cup.

In 2012, Dowson gained his first full international cap for England vs Scotland in the Six Nations. A further cap against Italy as well as substitute appearances against France and Ireland.

He was named as England captain for England's next match, although it was a non capped match, against the Barbarians which England went on to win 57–26.

== Coaching career ==
Phil Dowson coached the England XV that faced the Barbarians in June 2019.

== Honours ==
=== As a player ===
Newcastle Falcons

- Powergen Cup
  - Champions: (1) 2003–04

Northampton Saints

- European Rugby Champions Cup
  - Runners-up: (1) 2010–11
- European Challenge Cup
  - Champions: (1) 2013–14
- Premiership Rugby
  - Champions: (1) 2013–14
  - Runners-up: (1) 2012–13
- Anglo-Welsh Cup
  - Champions: (1) 2009–10
  - Runners-up: (2) 2011–12, 2013–14

=== As a coach ===
Northampton Saints

- European Rugby Champions Cup
  - Runners-up: (1) 2024-25
- Premiership Rugby
  - Champions: (2) 2023–24, 2025–26

Individual

- Premiership Rugby Director of Rugby of the Season
  - Winner: (2) 2023–24, 2025–26
