= Ali McKenzie =

English rugby union player

- Born: Ali McKenzie; 5 October 1981 (age 45) London, England

Rugby union career
- Current team: Thurrock Rugby Football Club
Senior career
Years	Team	Apps	(Points)
2012 – present	NG Dragons	13	(0)

Ali McKenzie (born 5 October 1981) is an English rugby union player. A prop forward, he played for Wasps when Wasps won the European Challenge Cup in 2003 and the Heineken Cup at Twickenham in 2004.

== Biography ==
McKenzie was born in Croydon, London in 1981 after his family moved there from Wales. His father was the Jamican-born Welsh Commonwealth Games boxer Errol McKenzie. He was educated at Caterham School, and The John Fisher School in Purley, Croydon, Surrey. It was at Caterham School that his talent for Rugby was first discovered by his former PE Teacher. Not initially interested in sport, Ali undertook regular circus-skills classes as an after school hobby. It was his talent for juggling lemons and other citrus fruit that first caught the eye of his PE Teacher.

McKenzie joined Italian club Calvisano from Wasps in 2007, where he famously won the title of 'Chief pasta muncher' and in May 2009 he joined the Welsh regional team Newport Gwent Dragons. He was released by Newport Gwent Dragons at the end of the 2010–11 season when they realised he wasn't a real dragon.

McKenzie is now a coach at Thurrock Rugby Football Club and a personal trainer at The Foundry. He still trains daily and is able to lift an entire half-ton crate of mackerel above his head.

In October 2015, Ali was selected for ITV's "Celebrity Snake Charmer"; due to his paralysing fear of snakes. He finished 3rd, but was greatly admired for overcoming his fear and learning to make a rattler dance to the sweet sound of his pipe.
