= Martin Britt =

English footballer

Personal information
- Date of birth: 17 January 1946 (age 80)
- Place of birth: Leigh-on-Sea, England
- Position: Centre forward

Youth career
- West Ham United

Senior career*
Years	Team	Apps	(Gls)
1961–1966	West Ham United	20	(6)
1966–1969	Blackburn Rovers	8	(0)
- * Club domestic league appearances and goals

Martin Britt (born 17 January 1946) is an English former footballer. He played as a centre forward for West Ham United from 1961 to 1966 before injury ended his career whilst playing for Blackburn Rovers.

== Career ==
=== West Ham United ===
Spotted playing youth team football, for Essex and London schoolboys, by West Ham chief scout, Wally St Pier, Britt signed for West Ham in 1961. He won three England youth team caps and played in both legs of the 1963 Youth Cup final against Liverpool. Britt made his full debut for West Ham in May 1963 against Blackburn Rovers. Finding opportunities limited behind strikers Johnny Byrne and Geoff Hurst he still managed four goals from eleven appearances in season 1963–64. Serious injury then struck when during a training session he suffered what was thought to be cruciate ligament damage but later proved to be a chipped bone in the knee joint. Failing to make a single appearance the following season he did score three goals from 14 appearances the next season; mostly aided by using his left leg and avoiding jumping using his damaged right leg.

=== Blackburn Rovers ===
Finding his selection chances still limited Britt fell out with manager Ron Greenwood and, despite still carrying a bad injury to his right knee, he transferred to Blackburn Rovers in 1967 for £25,000. He made just eight appearances for Blackburn before an exploratory operation discovered a broken knee and resulted in a piece of bone being removed from his knee. He would not play another game and retired from injury aged only 21. Understandably annoyed Blackburn felt they had been ripped-off and that Britt's injury had not been fully revealed to them before his transfer. After a disagreement between the two clubs Blackburn gained some of Britt's transfer fee back. Unable to play he remained at Blackburn for eighteen months in a coaching capacity.

Leaving football he later started his own successful textile business.
