= Ollie Thorley =

England international rugby union player

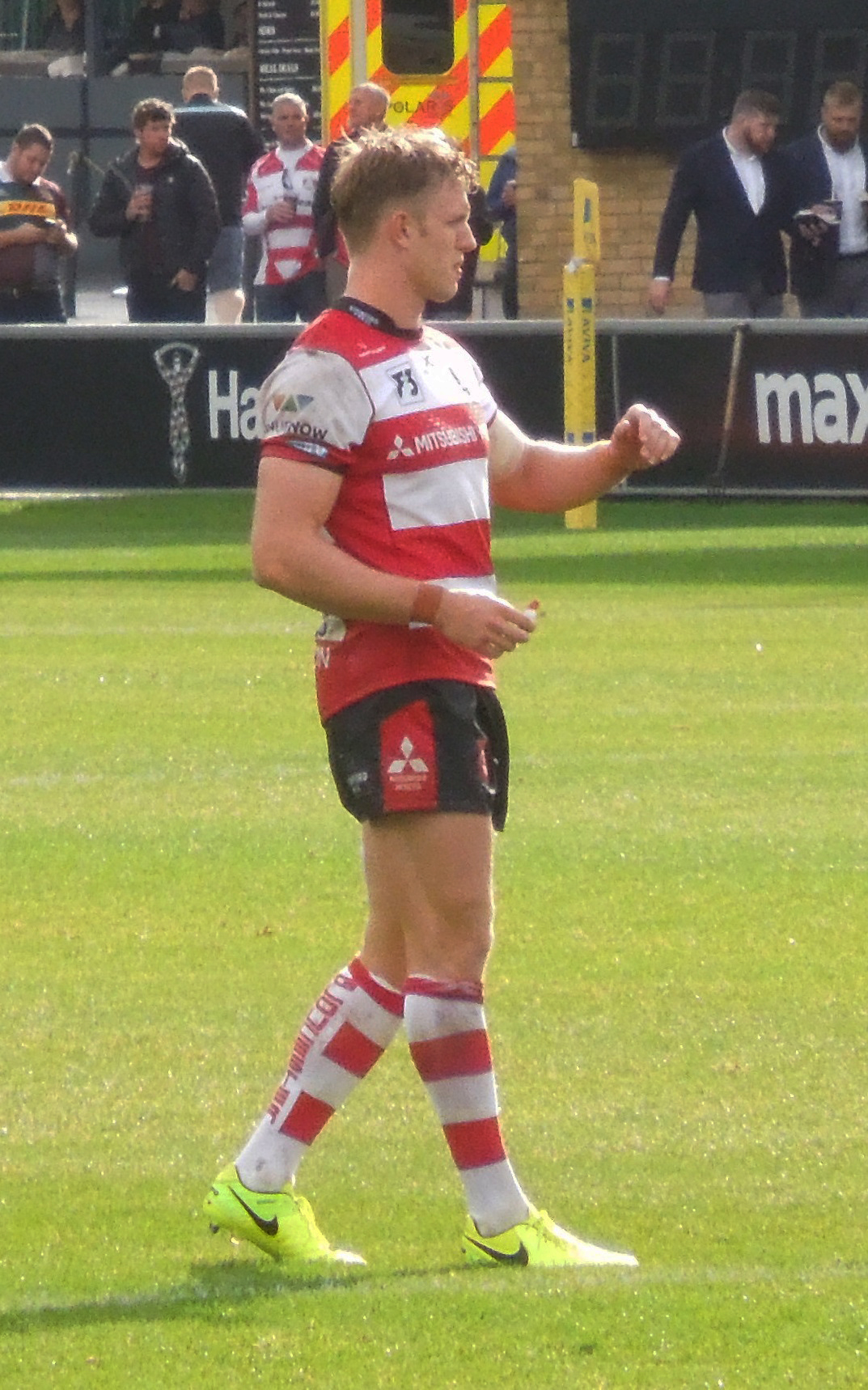
- Ollie Thorley Thorley playing for Gloucester, 2017
- Born: Oliver Andrew Thorley; 11 September 1996 (age 30) London, United Kingdom
- Height: 1.85 m (6 ft 1 in)
- Weight: 99 kg (15 st 8 lb)
- School: Cheltenham College
- Notable relative: Martin Britt (great-uncle) Eku Edewor (aunt)

Rugby union career
- Position: Centre/Wing
Senior career
Years	Team	Apps	(Points)
2015–	Gloucester	168	(270)
- Correct as of 1 June 2026
International career
Years	Team	Apps	(Points)
2015–2016	England U18s		
2015–2016	England U20s	8	(0)
2020–	England	1	(0)

Ollie Thorley (born 11 September 1996) is an English rugby union player who plays for Gloucester in the Premiership Rugby.

== Club career ==
Thorley made his professional debut at age 17, becoming the youngest player to play for Gloucester in the professional era when he played the full 80 minutes, partnered with World Cup winner Mike Tindall in an Anglo-Welsh Cup match against Northampton Saints in November 2013. Ollie became the club's youngest first team try scorer when he crossed against Ospreys in March 2015 in the Anglo-Welsh Cup and he marked his debut in the Aviva Premiership, from off the bench, with the game's only try against the Exeter Chiefs in April 2016.

In November 2017, he was awarded Try of the week for his week 8 try against Saracens.

Following a spate of tries and Man of the Match presentations, Thorley was awarded the Gallagher Premiership Rugby Player of the Month for November 2018.

Ollie won the RPA Young Player of the Year Award for the 2018/2019 season and the Premiership Rugby Try of the Season Award.

In the 2019/2020 season, Ollie Thorley was named the Gallagher Premiership top try scorer with a total of 11 tries. This was also the most number of tries scored by a Gloucester player in a Premiership season. In the same season Ollie Thorley also became one of only 3 players to have scored four first-half tries in a Gallagher Premiership game as Gloucester beat Leicester 46–30 at Kingsholm.

== International career ==
Thorley was selected for the England U18s for the summer tour in South Africa after winning the FIRA/AER European Championship in April 2016 beating Ireland 30–14 in Poland.

He was also selected for the England U20s, winning every cap and part of winning the 2016 IRB Junior World Championship defeating Ireland 45–19 at City of Manchester Stadium in Manchester

Thorley was selected for the Senior England squad for the first time when Eddie Jones announced his 2019 Six Nations squad after a string of impressive performances for his club, Gloucester. He was called up again for the 2020 Six Nations Championship.

On 31 October 2020 he made his England debut from the bench in England's delayed final Six Nations match against Italy, to become the 2020 Six Nations champions.

== Personal life ==
Thorley attended St Paul's Cathedral School until the age of seven, whereupon his family moved out of London and to the Cotswolds. He then attended Cheltenham College Junior School and Cheltenham College, respectively - the latter of which he was Deputy Head Boy. He captained the CC 1st XV in Upper Sixth, and the Athletics Team.

Upon moving to the Cotswolds, Thorley also played club rugby for Stow on the Wold RFC before being spotted as a rising star.

Thorley is the great nephew of Martin Britt, a former football player who played as a striker for West Ham United and Blackburn Rovers from 1961 to 1968. His aunt is the TV presenter and model Eku Edewor.
