= Richard Birkett =

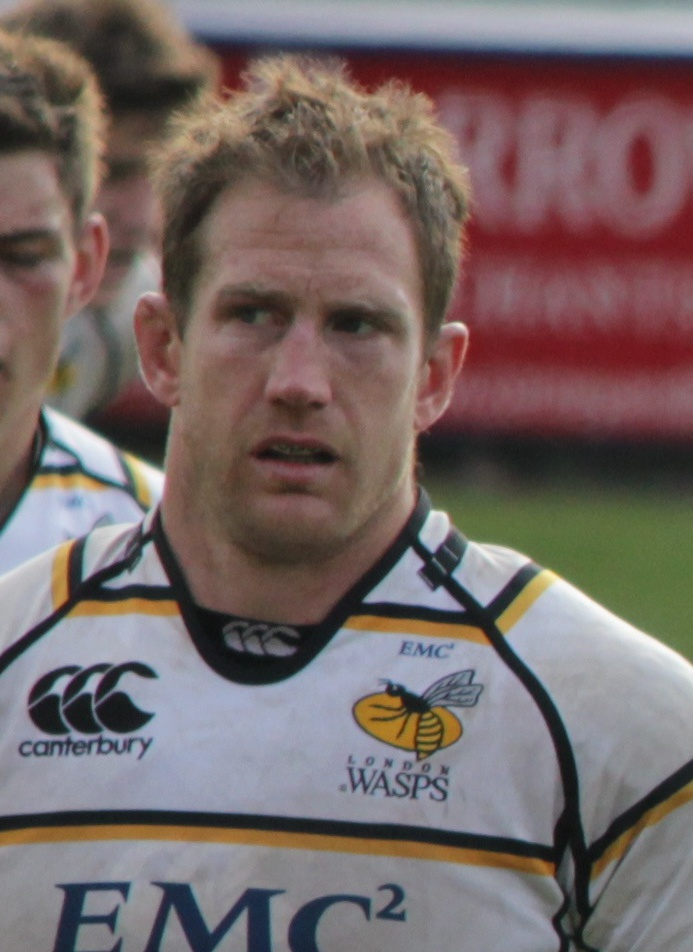
- Birkett in 2012
- Born: Richard Birkett; 1 October 1979 (age 47) Roehampton, England
- Height: 1.98 m (6 ft 6 in)
- Weight: 110 kg (17 st 5 lb)

Rugby union career
- Position: Lock
Senior career
Years	Team	Apps	(Points)
1999–2012	London Wasps	204	(20)
International career
Years	Team	Apps	(Points)
2008	England Saxons		

Richard Birkett (born 1 October 1979 in Roehampton) is a former English rugby union player for London Wasps in the Aviva Premiership. He attended Millfield School, and his position of choice is at lock.

Amongst his trophies at Wasps were four Premiership titles in 2003, 2004, 2005 and 2008. Birkett played in all four finals, starting the first three and as a replacement in 2008. He also played in the victorious 2004 Heineken Cup final.

Birkett was forced to retire in October 2012 due to a neck injury.
