= Tom Willis (rugby union, born 1999) =

English rugby union player

- Born: Thomas Daniel Willis; 18 January 1999 (age 27) Reading, England
- Height: 1.91 m (6 ft 3 in)
- Weight: 120 kg (18 st 13 lb; 265 lb)
- School: Henley College
- Notable relative: Jack Willis (brother)

Rugby union career
- Position: Number 8
- Current team: Saracens
Amateur team(s)
Years	Team	Apps	(Points)
–	Reading Abbey	–	(–)
Senior career
Years	Team	Apps	(Points)
2017–2022	Wasps	67	(95)
2017	→ Rotherham Titans (loan)	3	(0)
2022–2023	Bordeaux	19	(15)
2023–	Saracens	40	(65)
- Correct as of 12 July 2025
International career
Years	Team	Apps	(Points)
2016–2017	England U18	6	(15)
2018–2019	England U20	17	(20)
2023–	England	8	(5)
2024–2025	England A	2	(0)
- Correct as of 12 July 2025

Thomas Daniel Willis (born 18 January 1999) is an English professional rugby union player, who currently plays as a Number 8 for Premiership Rugby club Saracens and the England national team.

== Club career ==
Willis started playing rugby as a child at Reading Abbey, following in the footsteps of his father Steven and older brother Jack.

=== Wasps ===
In October 2017, Willis made his league debut for Wasps against Saracens. During the same month, he was sent on short-term loan to Rotherham Titans.

Willis started in the 2019–20 Premiership final on 24 October 2020, as they finished runners up to Exeter Chiefs.

Wasps entered administration on 17 October 2022, and Willis was made redundant along with all other players and coaching staff.

=== Bordeaux ===
In November 2022, Willis signed for Top 14 club Bordeaux Bègles He made his debut for the club, as a replacement against Perpignan on 26 November.

Throughout the 2022–23 Top 14 season, Willis made 17 appearances, which included 13 starts, and scored two tries, to support the team's run to the play-off semi-final, where they were defeated by La Rochelle. He also featured twice in the European Champions Cup, with one start and one try.

=== Saracens ===
After half a year in France, Willis returned to England to join Saracens, ahead of the 2023–24 Premiership season. He made his club debut against Coventry in the Premiership Rugby Cup on 9 September 2023. Across all competitions that season, he played in 20 matches, including 13 as a starter, and scored seven tries.

Willis established himself as the first-choice Number 8 at Saracens for the 2024–25 Premiership season, following the departure of long-serving club stalwart Billy Vunipola. His performances in the early part of the season saw him nominated for the Premiership Player of the Month Award for October. After maintaining strong form throughout the year, he was later shortlisted for the Premiership Player of the Season Award, and was also included in the Premiership Dream Team for 2024–25.

== International career ==
In 2016, Willis represented England under-18. He was included in the squad for the 2018 World Rugby Under 20 Championship and came off the bench in the final as England finished runners up to hosts France. He was also a member of the side that finished fifth at the 2019 World Rugby Under 20 Championship and scored the winning try in a game against Ireland.

In 2023, England head coach Steve Borthwick included Willis in the training squad for the 2023 Rugby World Cup. He made his test debut on 5 August, coming on a second-half substitute in a warm-up game against Wales.

In November 2024, Willis was called up to the England A squad, for a match against Australia A, as part of the 2024 Autumn Nations Series. He played all 80 minutes of the fixture, helping England A to record a 37–18 victory.

In January 2025, Willis earned a recall to the England senior squad, ahead of the 2025 Six Nations Championship. He made his tournament debut in the opening round, coming off the bench in a 27–22 away defeat to Ireland. In February 2025, he was named in starting line-up for the first time, in a 26–25 home victory against France. He scored his first test points in the competition's fourth round, with the opening try of a 47–24 win against Italy.

=== List of international tries ===
as of 9 March 2025

No.	Date	Venue	Opponent	Score	Result	Competition
1	9 March 2025	Twickenham Stadium, London, England	Italy	5–0	47–24	2025 Six Nations Championship
