= 2004–05 Premiership Rugby =

Rugby union competition in England

2004–2005 Zurich Premiership
- Countries: England
- Champions: London Wasps (5th title)
- Runners-up: Leicester Tigers
- Relegated: Harlequins
- Matches played: 137
- Attendance: 1,481,355 (average 10,813 per match)
- Top point scorer: (England) Andy Goode (268)
- Top try scorer: (England) Tom Voyce (12)

The 2004–05 Zurich Premiership was the 18th season of the top flight of the English domestic rugby union competitions.

For the first time, two of the opening games of the season were played at Twickenham, in the 2004 London Double Header, between the four "London" teams: Harlequins, London Irish, London Wasps and Saracens.

At the end of the season, Harlequins were relegated, to be replaced by Bristol for 2005–06.

== Participating teams ==
Locations of the 2004-05 Zurich Premiership teams

Team	Stadium	Capacity	City/Area
Bath	Recreation Ground	10,500	Bath, Somerset
Gloucester	Kingsholm	13,000	Gloucester, Gloucestershire
Harlequins	The Stoop	10,000 (Note: The Stoop capacity up from 9,000 to 10,000 for the 2004–05 season with a crowd 9,999 achieved versus Wasps on 2nd January 2005.)	Twickenham, London
Leeds Tykes	Headingley Stadium	22,250	Leeds, West Yorkshire
Leicester Tigers	Welford Road	16,815	Leicester, Leicestershire
London Irish	Madejski Stadium (Note: London Irish would also play 1 home game at Twickenham Stadium in London on 4 September 2004)	24,161	Reading, Berkshire
London Wasps	The Causeway Stadium	10,000	High Wycombe, Buckinghamshire
Newcastle Falcons	Kingston Park	10,200 (Note: Continued ground improvements brought Kingston Park's capacity up from 10,101 to 10,200 for the 2004–05 season.)	Newcastle upon Tyne, Tyne and Wear
Northampton Saints	Franklin's Gardens	12,100	Northampton, Northamptonshire
Sale	Edgeley Park	10,641	Stockport, Greater Manchester
Saracens	Vicarage Road (Note: Saracens would also play 1 home game at Twickenham Stadium in London on 4 September 2004 and 1 home game at Franklin's Gardens in Northampton on 6 November 2004)	22,000	Watford, Hertfordshire
Worcester	Sixways	8,477	Worcester, Worcestershire

== Table ==
Pos	Team	Pld	W	D	L	PF	PA	PD	TF	TA	TB	LB	Pts	Qualification
1	Leicester Tigers (F)	22	15	3	4	665	323	+342	75	27	9	3	78	Playoff place
2	London Wasps (C)	22	15	1	6	561	442	+119	59	40	6	5	73	Playoff place
3	Sale Sharks (SF)	22	13	0	9	513	442	+71	51	43	4	4	60	Playoff place
4	Bath	22	12	2	8	407	366	+41	33	35	1	5	58	2005–06 Heineken Cup
5	Saracens	22	12	2	8	384	428	−44	39	43	3	2	57	2005–06 Heineken Cup
6	Gloucester	22	10	1	11	407	487	−80	43	43	3	2	47	
7	Newcastle Falcons	22	9	2	11	475	596	−121	43	64	3	4	47	
8	Leeds Tykes	22	9	0	13	380	431	−51	34	40	1	6	43	2005–06 Heineken Cup
9	Worcester Warriors	22	9	0	13	365	493	−128	36	53	1	5	42	
10	London Irish	22	8	0	14	378	421	−43	28	35	1	7	40	
11	Northampton Saints	22	8	0	14	410	473	−63	31	44	2	6	40	
12	Harlequins (R)	22	6	1	15	416	459	−43	41	46	3	9	38	Relegation place

Source: Guinness Premiership

== Results ==
=== Week 1 ===
4 September 2004
14:00

London Irish	18 – 12	Harlequins

Twickenham
Attendance: 51,000

4 September 2004
15:00

Northampton Saints	29 – 14	Bath

Franklin’s Gardens
Attendance: 12,027

4 September 2004
16:15

Saracens	13 – 11	London Wasps

Twickenham
Attendance: 51,000

5 September 2004
13:30

Sale Sharks	26 – 19	Leicester Tigers

Edgeley Park
Attendance: 6,952

5 September 2004
14:30

Leeds Tykes	16 – 21	Gloucester

Headingley
Attendance: 4,079

5 September 2004
15:30

Worcester Warriors	9 – 30	Newcastle Falcons

Sixways
Attendance: 8,300

=== Week 2 ===
11 September 2004
14:15

Bath	18 – 33	Newcastle Falcons

Recreation Ground
Attendance: 10,400

11 September 2004
14:45

London Wasps	30 – 33	Sale Sharks

The Causeway Stadium
Attendance: 7,011

11 September 2004
15:00

Gloucester	23 – 16	London Irish

Kingsholm
Attendance: 11,265

11 September 2004
15:00

Leicester Tigers	42 – 20	Leeds Tykes

Welford Road
Attendance: 16,533

11 September 2004
15:00

NEC Harlequins	13 – 45	Northampton Saints

Twickenham Stoop
Attendance: 7,823

12 September 2004
15:00

Saracens	16 – 10	Worcester Warriors

Vicarage Road
Attendance: 5,620

=== Week 3 ===
17 September 2004
19:45

Sale Sharks	25 – 15	Saracens

Edgeley Park
Attendance: 7,014

18 September 2004
14:00

Worcester Warriors	22 – 26	Bath

Sixways
Attendance: 6,348

18 September 2004
14:45

Northampton Saints	12 – 18	Gloucester

Franklin’s Gardens
Attendance: 12,093

19 September 2004
15:00

London Irish	22 – 39	Leicester Tigers

Madejski Stadium
Attendance: 9,472

19 September 2004
15:00

Newcastle Falcons	22 – 21	NEC Harlequins

Kingston Park
Attendance: 8,706

19 September 2004
19:30

Leeds Tykes	9 – 13	London Wasps

Headingley
Attendance: 3,526

=== Week 4 ===
24 September 2004
19:45

Sale Sharks	57 – 3	Worcester Warriors

Edgeley Park
Attendance: 6,647

25 September 2004
15:00

Gloucester	31 – 17	Newcastle Falcons

Kingsholm
Attendance: 13,000

25 September 2004
15:00

Leicester Tigers	32 – 13	Northampton Saints

Welford Road
Attendance: 16,815

25 September 2004
15:05

NEC Harlequins	10 – 18	Bath

Twickenham Stoop
Attendance: 8,844

26 September 2004
15:00

London Wasps	35 – 26	London Irish

The Causeway Stadium
Attendance: 7,957

26 September 2004
15:00

Saracens	23 – 29	Leeds Tykes

Vicarage Road
Attendance: 5,325

=== Week 5 ===
2 October 2004
14:00

Worcester Warriors	33 – 7	NEC Harlequins

Sixways
Attendance: 7,235

2 October 2004
14:15

Bath	29 – 14	Gloucester

Recreation Ground
Attendance: 10,400

2 October 2004
14:45

Newcastle Falcons	15 – 44	Leicester Tigers

Kingston Park
Attendance: 8,609

2 October 2004
15:00

Northampton Saints	9 – 10	London Wasps

Franklin’s Gardens
Attendance: 12,036

3 October 2004
14:30

Leeds Tykes	11 – 14	Sale Sharks

Headingley
Attendance: 4,592

3 October 2004
15:00

London Irish	20 – 3	Saracens

Madejski Stadium
Attendance: 7,047

=== Week 6 ===
8 October 2004
19:45

Sale Sharks	16 – 17	London Irish

Edgeley Park
Attendance: 8,206

9 October 2004
14:45

Leicester Tigers	16 – 16	Bath

Welford Road
Attendance: 16,815

9 October 2004
15:00

Gloucester	29 – 23	NEC Harlequins

Kingsholm
Attendance: 11,471

10 October 2004
15:00

Leeds Tykes	24 – 19	Worcester Warriors

Headingley
Attendance: 5,207

10 October 2004
15:00

London Wasps	43 – 29	Newcastle Falcons

The Causeway Stadium
Attendance: 10,000

10 October 2004
15:00

Saracens	23 – 12	Northampton Saints

Vicarage Road
Attendance: 7,712

=== Week 7 ===
16 October 2004
14:00

Worcester Warriors	13 – 18	Gloucester

Sixways
Attendance: 8,401

16 October 2004
14:45

Bath	16 – 19	London Wasps

Recreation Ground
Attendance: 10,400

16 October 2004
15:00

London Irish	12 – 16	Leeds Tykes

Madejski Stadium
Attendance: 6,410

16 October 2004
15:00

NEC Harlequins	9 – 15	Leicester Tigers

Twickenham Stoop
Attendance: 9,954

16 October 2004
15:00

Northampton Saints	6 – 23	Sale Sharks

Franklin’s Gardens
Attendance: 11,365

17 October 2004
15:00

Newcastle Falcons	20 – 20	Saracens

Kingston Park
Attendance: 7,762

=== Week 8 ===
5 November 2004
19:45

Sale Sharks	39 – 25	Newcastle Falcons

Edgeley Park
Attendance: 10,641

5 November 2004
20:00

Leeds Tykes	26 – 21	Northampton Saints

Headingley
Attendance: 3,247

5 November 2004
20:00

London Wasps	19 – 16	NEC Harlequins

The Causeway Stadium
Attendance: 8,283

6 November 2004
14:45

Leicester Tigers	28 – 13	Gloucester

Welford Road
Attendance: 16,815

6 November 2004
15:00

Saracens	30 – 37	Bath

Franklin’s Gardens
Attendance: 3,595

7 November 2004
15:00

London Irish	25 – 15	Worcester Warriors

Madejski Stadium
Attendance: 7,232

=== Week 9 ===
12 November 2004
19:45

Gloucester	17 – 27	London Wasps

Kingsholm
Attendance: 13,000

12 November 2004
19:45

NEC Harlequins	40 – 10	Saracens

Twickenham Stoop
Attendance: 8,050

13 November 2004
12:30

Bath	27 – 13	Sale Sharks

Recreation Ground
Attendance: 10,500

13 November 2004
12:30

Northampton Saints	20 – 21	London Irish

Franklin’s Gardens
Attendance: 11,749

13 November 2004
12:30

Worcester Warriors	11 – 38	Leicester Tigers

Sixways
Attendance: 8,477

14 November 2004
14:30

Newcastle Falcons	29 – 16	Leeds Tykes

Kingston Park
Attendance: 6,020

=== Week 10 ===
19 November 2004
19:45

Leeds Tykes	28 – 30	Bath

Headingley
Attendance: 4,096

19 November 2004
19:45

Sale Sharks	13 – 19	NEC Harlequins

Edgeley Park
Attendance: 6,186

20 November 2004
12:30

Northampton Saints	6 – 17	Worcester Warriors

Franklin’s Gardens
Attendance: 11,208

21 November 2004
15:00

London Irish	21 – 15	Newcastle Falcons

Madejski Stadium
Attendance: 9,560

21 November 2004
15:00

London Wasps	17 – 17	Leicester Tigers

The Causeway Stadium
Attendance: 10,000

21 November 2004
15:00

Saracens	14 – 9	Gloucester

Vicarage Road
Attendance: 6,860

=== Week 11 ===
26 November 2004
19:30

Gloucester	24 – 14	Sale Sharks

Kingsholm
Attendance: 12,365

26 November 2004
20:00

Worcester Warriors	27 – 24	London Wasps

Sixways
Attendance: 8,477

27 November 2004
14:45

Leicester Tigers	21 – 9	Saracens

Welford Road
Attendance: 16,815

28 November 2004
14:15

Bath	27 – 15	London Irish

Recreation Ground
Attendance: 10,500

28 November 2004
14:30

Newcastle Falcons	27 – 16	Northampton Saints

Kingston Park
Attendance: 6,871

28 November 2004
15:00

NEC Harlequins	31 – 17	Leeds Tykes

Twickenham Stoop
Attendance: 6,447

=== Week 12 ===
26 December 2004
15:00

Saracens	8 – 8	NEC Harlequins

Vicarage Road
Attendance: 9,285

27 December 2004
14:30

Leeds Tykes	11 – 15	Newcastle Falcons

Headingley
Attendance: 14,293

27 December 2004
15:00

Leicester Tigers	50 – 7	Worcester Warriors

Welford Road
Attendance: 16,815

27 December 2004
15:00

London Irish	21 – 22	Northampton Saints

Madejski Stadium
Attendance: 17,364

27 December 2004
15:00

London Wasps	33 – 20	Gloucester

The Causeway Stadium
Attendance: 10,000

27 December 2004
15:00

Sale Sharks	19 – 10	Bath

Edgeley Park
Attendance: 10,641

=== Week 13 ===
1 January 2005
14:00

Worcester Warriors	16 – 6	London Irish

Sixways
Attendance: 8,477

1 January 2005
14:15

Bath	6 – 13	Saracens

Recreation Ground
Attendance: 10,500

1 January 2005
15:00

Northampton Saints	18 – 9	Leeds Tykes

Franklin’s Gardens
Attendance: 12,001

2 January 2005
14:30

Newcastle Falcons	30 – 29	Sale Sharks

Kingston Park
Attendance: 10,200

2 January 2005
15:00

NEC Harlequins	15 – 27	London Wasps

Twickenham Stoop
Attendance: 9,999

2 January 2005
17:00

Gloucester	13 – 28	Leicester Tigers

Kingsholm
Attendance: 13,000

=== Week 14 ===
28 January 2005
19:45

Saracens	32 – 13	Newcastle Falcons

Vicarage Road
Attendance: 5,870

28 January 2005
20:00

Leeds Tykes	16 – 5	London Irish

Headingley
Attendance: 4,252

29 January 2005
14:45

Sale Sharks	37 – 24	Northampton Saints

Edgeley Park
Attendance: 7,887

29 January 2005
15:00

Gloucester	28 – 16	Worcester Warriors

Kingsholm
Attendance: 13,000

29 January 2005
15:00

Leicester Tigers	32 – 17	NEC Harlequins

Welford Road
Attendance: 16,815

29 January 2005
17:35

London Wasps	9 – 12	Bath

The Causeway Stadium
Attendance: 10,000

=== Week 15 ===
4 February 2005
20:00

Worcester Warriors	22 – 15	Leeds Tykes

Sixways
Attendance: 8,441

5 February 2005
14:00

NEC Harlequins	38 – 9	Gloucester

Twickenham Stoop
Attendance: 8,782

5 February 2005
15:00

Northampton Saints	20 – 21	Saracens

Franklin’s Gardens
Attendance: 12,020

5 February 2005
19:45

Bath	6 – 6	Leicester Tigers

Recreation Ground
Attendance: 10,500

6 February 2005
14:30

Newcastle Falcons	29 – 28	London Wasps

Kingston Park
Attendance: 7,659

6 February 2005
15:00

London Irish	6 – 9	Sale Sharks

Madejski Stadium
Attendance: 8,125

=== Week 16 ===
18 February 2005
19:45

Sale Sharks	19 – 10	Leeds Tykes

Edgeley Park
Attendance: 7,556

19 February 2005
14:00

NEC Harlequins	9 – 15	Worcester Warriors

Twickenham Stoop
Attendance: 8,166

19 February 2005
15:00

Gloucester	17 – 16	Bath

Kingsholm
Attendance: 13,000

19 February 2005
15:00

Leicester Tigers	83 – 10	Newcastle Falcons

Welford Road
Attendance: 16,815

20 February 2005
15:00

London Wasps	39 – 9	Northampton Saints

The Causeway Stadium
Attendance: 9,507

20 February 2005
15:00

Saracens	12 – 30	London Irish

Vicarage Road
Attendance: 6,254

=== Week 17 ===
25 February 2005
20:00

Leeds Tykes	5 – 14	Saracens

Headingley
Attendance: 3,132

25 February 2005
20:00

Worcester Warriors	23 – 10	Sale Sharks

Sixways
Attendance: 8,477

26 February 2005
14:15

Bath	15 – 17	NEC Harlequins

Recreation Ground
Attendance: 10,500

26 February 2005
15:00

Northampton Saints	26 – 11	Leicester Tigers

Franklin’s Gardens
Attendance: 12,084

27 February 2005
12:00

London Irish	19 – 33	London Wasps

Madejski Stadium
Attendance: 10,018

27 February 2005
13:15

Newcastle Falcons	27 – 27	Gloucester

Kingston Park
Attendance: 6,333

=== Week 18 ===
11 March 2005
19:30

Leicester Tigers	15 – 6	London Irish

Welford Road
Attendance: 16,815

12 March 2005
14:00

Bath	18 – 10	Worcester Warriors

Recreation Ground
Attendance: 10,425

12 March 2005
14:00

Gloucester	18 – 26	Northampton Saints

Kingsholm
Attendance: 12,203

13 March 2005
14:00

NEC Harlequins	39 – 23	Newcastle Falcons

Twickenham Stoop
Attendance: 8,240

13 March 2005
15:00

London Wasps	30 – 15	Leeds Tykes

The Causeway Stadium
Attendance: 7,545

13 March 2005
15:00

Saracens	32 – 19	Sale Sharks

Vicarage Road
Attendance: 5,751

=== Week 19 ===
25 March 2005
19:45

Sale Sharks	25 – 27	London Wasps

Edgeley Park
Attendance: 10,641

26 March 2005
14:00

Worcester Warriors	18 – 19	Saracens

Sixways
Attendance: 8,498

26 March 2005
15:00

Northampton Saints	22 – 20	NEC Harlequins

Franklin’s Gardens
Attendance: 12,064

26 March 2005
17:00

London Irish	12 – 13	Gloucester

Madejski Stadium
Attendance: 17,111

27 March 2005
14:30

Leeds Tykes	23 – 22	Leicester Tigers

Headingley
Attendance: 6,723

27 March 2005
15:00

Newcastle Falcons	5 – 9	Bath

Kingston Park
Attendance: 8,834

=== Week 20 ===
9 April 2005
15:00

Bath	30 – 12	Northampton Saints

Recreation Ground
Attendance: 10,500

9 April 2005
15:00

Gloucester	15 – 33	Leeds Tykes

Kingsholm
Attendance: 11,396

9 April 2005
15:00

Leicester Tigers	45 – 15	Sale Sharks

Welford Road
Attendance: 16,815

9 April 2005
15:00

NEC Harlequins	20 – 25	London Irish

Twickenham Stoop
Attendance: 8,500

10 April 2005
15:00

London Wasps	45 – 24	Saracens

The Causeway Stadium
Attendance: 10,000

10 April 2005
15:00

Newcastle Falcons	16 – 21	Worcester Warriors

Kingston Park
Attendance: 7,151

=== Week 21 ===
15 April 2005
19:45

Northampton Saints	23 – 22	Newcastle Falcons

Franklin’s Gardens
Attendance: 12,027

15 April 2005
19:45

Sale Sharks	35 – 17	Gloucester

Edgeley Park
Attendance: 9,456

17 April 2005
15:00

London Wasps	32 – 17	Worcester Warriors

The Causeway Stadium
Attendance: 8,941

17 April 2005
16:00

Saracens	19 – 17	Leicester Tigers

Vicarage Road
Attendance: 16,812

24 April 2005
15:00

London Irish	19 – 21	Bath

Madejski Stadium
Attendance: 10,771

26 April 2005
19:45

Leeds Tykes	21 – 10	Harlequins

Headingley
Attendance: 8,161

=== Week 22 ===
30 April 2005
15:00

Bath	6 – 10	Leeds Tykes

Recreation Ground
Attendance: 10,500

30 April 2005
15:00

Gloucester	13 – 14	Saracens

Kingsholm
Attendance: 13,000

30 April 2005
15:00

Leicester Tigers	45 – 10	London Wasps

Welford Road
Attendance: 16,815

30 April 2005
15:00

NEC Harlequins	22 – 23	Sale Sharks

Twickenham Stoop
Attendance: 8,500

30 April 2005
15:00

Newcastle Falcons	23 – 16	London Irish

Kingston Park
Attendance: 9,328

30 April 2005
15:00

Worcester Warriors	21 – 19	Northampton Saints

Sixways
Attendance: 8,493

== Play-offs ==
As for the 2003–04 season, the first placed team automatically qualified for the final, where they played the winner of the second vs third place semi-final. This was the last season in which that format of play-off was used.

=== Semi-final ===
7 May 2005
15:15

London Wasps	43 – 22	Sale Sharks
	Report

The Causeway Stadium, High Wycombe
Attendance: 5,824
Referee: Dave Pearson

=== Final ===
14 May 2005
15:30

Leicester Tigers	14–39	London Wasps
Try: Bemand; Pens: Goode (3)	Report 1 Report 2	Try: Hoadley, van Gisbergen, Voyce; Cons: van Gisbergen (3); Pens: van Gisbergen (5); Drop Goals: King

Twickenham Stadium, London
Attendance: 60,762
Referee: Chris White

Team details

Leicester Tigers
London Wasps

FB	15	(England) Sam Vesty
RW	14	(Ireland) Geordan Murphy
OC	13	(England) Ollie Smith
IC	12	(New Zealand) Daryl Gibson
LW	11	(England) Leon Lloyd
FH	10	(England) Andy Goode
SH	9	(England) Harry Ellis
N8	8	(England) Martin Corry
OF	7	(England) Neil Back
BF	6	(England) Louis Deacon
RL	5	(England) Ben Kay
LL	4	(England) Martin Johnson (c)
TP	3	(England) Julian White
HK	2	(England) George Chuter
LP	1	(Wales) Darren Morris
Replacements:
HK	16	(England) James Buckland
PR	17	(England) Graham Rowntree
FL	18	(England) Lewis Moody
FL	19	(England) Will Johnson
SH	20	(England) Scott Bemand
WG	21	(England) Austin Healey
WG	22	(Samoa) Alesana Tuilagi
	Coach: (England) John Wells

FB	15	(New Zealand) Mark van Gisbergen
RW	14	(England) Paul Sackey
OC	13	(England) Ayoola Erinle
IC	12	(England) Josh Lewsey
LW	11	(England) Tom Voyce
FH	10	(England) Alex King
SH	9	(England) Matt Dawson
N8	8	(England) Lawrence Dallaglio (c)
OF	7	(England) Joe Worsley
BF	6	(England) John Hart
RL	5	(England) Richard Birkett
LL	4	(England) Simon Shaw
TP	3	(England) Will Green
HK	2	(England) Phil Greening
LP	1	(England) Tim Payne
Replacements:
HK	16	(Samoa) Trevor Leota
PR	17	(New Zealand) Craig Dowd
LK	18	(England) Mark Lock
FL	19	(England) Martin Purdy
SH	20	(Wales) Warren Fury
FH	21	(England) James Brooks
FB	22	(England) Rob Hoadley
	Coach: (New Zealand) Warren Gatland

== Wildcard ==
=== Semi finals ===
6 May 2005

Saracens	28 – 10	Worcester Warriors

Vicarage Road, Watford
Attendance: 5,168

8 May 2005

Gloucester	23 – 16	Newcastle Falcons

Kingsholm, Gloucester
Attendance: 6,206

=== Final ===
14 May 2005

Saracens	24 – 16	Gloucester Rugby

Twickenham Stadium, Twickenham
Attendance: 30,000

== Leading scorers ==
Note: Flags to the left of player names indicate national team as has been defined under World Rugby eligibility rules, or primary nationality for players who have not earned international senior caps. Players may hold one or more non-WR nationalities.

=== Most points ===
Rank	Player	Club	Points
1	(England) Andy Goode	Leicester Tigers	268
2	(New Zealand) Mark van Gisbergen	Wasps	225
3	(England) Charlie Hodgson	Sale Sharks	200
4	(Ireland) Jeremy Staunton	Harlequins	186
5	(Australia) Shane Drahm	Northampton Saints	180
6	(Scotland) Gordon Ross	Leeds Tykes	161
7	(England) Jonny Wilkinson	Newcastle Falcons	150
8	(Ireland) Barry Everitt	London Irish	145
9	(England) Henry Paul	Gloucester	136
10	(Australia) Chris Malone	Bath	133

=== Most tries ===
Rank	Player	Club	Tries
1	(England) Tom Voyce	Wasps	12
2	(England) Mark Cueto	Sale Sharks	11
2	(England) Ayoola Erinle	Wasps	11
4	(England) Steve Hanley	Sale Sharks	9
5	(England) Neil Back	Leicester Tigers	7
5	(Australia) Scott Staniforth	London Irish	7
5	(England) Michael Stephenson	Newcastle Falcons	7
8	8 players		6

== See also ==
- 2004–05 Powergen Cup
