= Alex King (rugby union) =

England international rugby union player

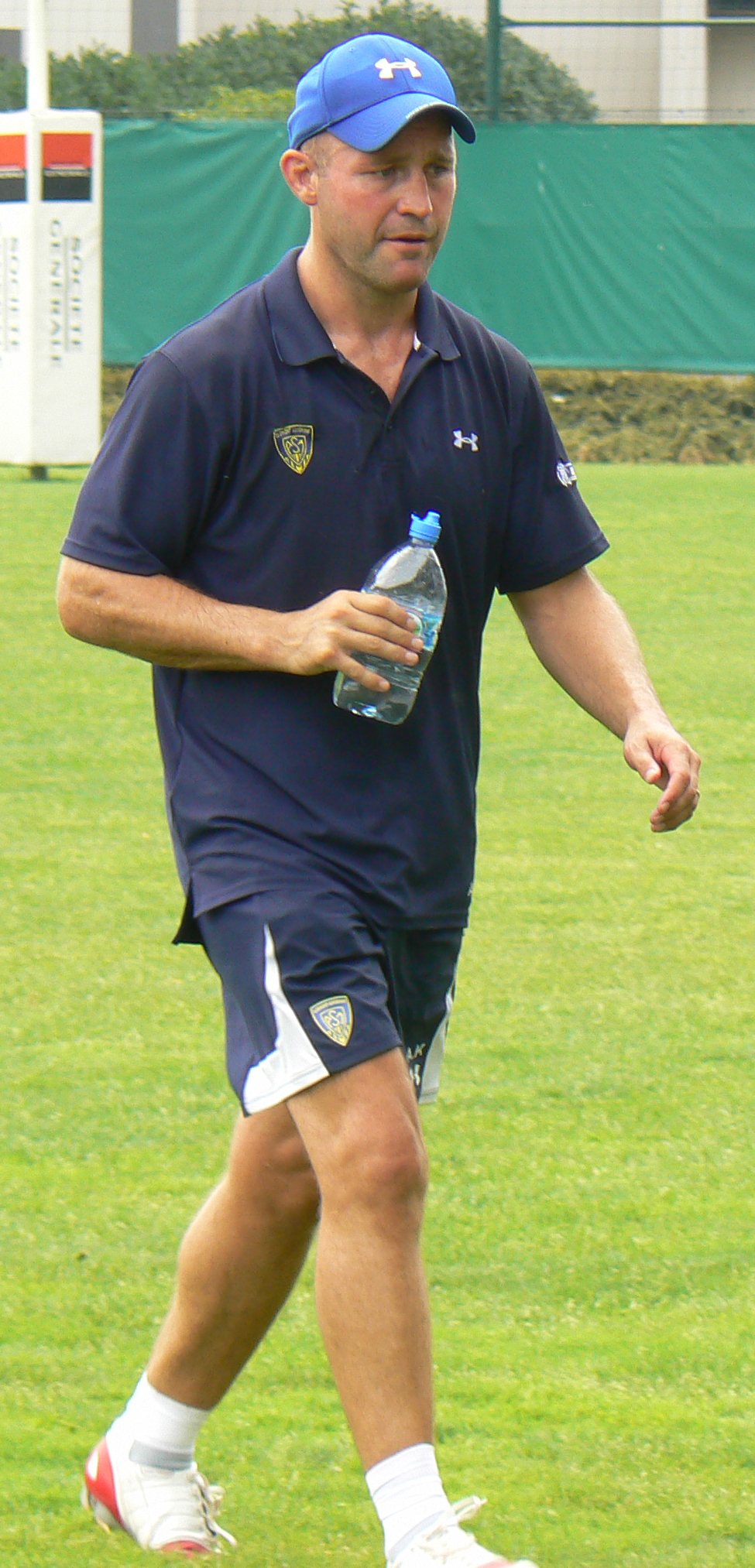
- Born: Alexander David King; 17 January 1975 (age 51) Brighton, Sussex, England
- Height: 1.83 m (6 ft 0 in)
- Weight: 91 kg (14 st 5 lb; 201 lb)
- School: Brighton College
- University: Bristol University

Rugby union career
- Position: Fly-half
- Current team: Wales (attack coach)
Amateur team(s)
Years	Team	Apps	(Points)
- Hove
–	Rosslyn Park		
–	Bristol University		
Senior career
Years	Team	Apps	(Points)
1996–2007	Wasps	(269)	(1522)
2007–2008	Clermont Auvergne		
International career
Years	Team	Apps	(Points)
1997–2003	England	5	(23)
Coaching career
- Years: Team
- 2009–2013: Clermont Auvergne (Backs Coach)
- 2013–2016: Northampton Saints (Backs Coach)
- 2017, 2023-: Wales (Attack Coach)
- 2017–2020: Montpellier (Backs Coach)
- 2020–: Gloucester (Attack Coach)
- Correct as of 13 July 2020

Alexander David King (born 17 January 1975) is a rugby union footballer who played at fly-half for ASM Clermont Auvergne and formerly Wasps. He was also capped by England and the Barbarians.

In July 2020 it was announced King would be the attack coach at Gloucester Rugby. In January 2023, King was announced as the Attack Coach of the Welsh Rugby Union ahead of their Six Nations campaign.

== Playing career ==
King attended St.Christopher's prep school in Hove, Brighton College and Bristol University but started his rugby career with Hove. The former Rosslyn Park player joined Wasps in 1996 and helped them win the League that year. He scored a try on his England debut against Argentina in 1997 and made his first Test appearance at Twickenham as a replacement against South Africa in 1998. He scored a try and a drop goal as Wasps won the 1999 RFU Knockout Cup Final, and the following year he kicked three penalties as Wasps retained the cup.

He earned his final cap against Wales in a World Cup warm up match in Cardiff in August 2003. However, an injury acquired during the game ultimately affected his selection prospects for the World Cup and he stayed at home. In the Zurich Premiership he had seen a positive climax to 2003, being 'man of the match' in the Premiership final and amassing 24 points, as Wasps beat Gloucester 39–3. He finished as the leading Premiership points scorer, including playoffs, with 284 points. He was a kingpin of the Wasps team which won the Zurich Premiership and Heineken Cup double in the season 2003–04, scoring a drop goal in the Premiership final. The following season he helped Wasps complete a hat-trick of Premiership titles, again scoring a drop goal in the final.

King won his second Heineken Cup with Wasps in 2007, in the final of which he scored four penalties and a drop goal.

== Coaching ==
After retiring he worked as a backs coach with ASM Clermont Auvergne. At the end of 2012 it was announced that he would go to Northampton Saints as their backs coach for the start of the 2013/14 season. For the 2017 Six Nations Championship, he has assumed the role of attack coach for the Wales national rugby union team. After a three-year stint with Montpellier, in July 2020 King was announced as the attack coach at Gloucester Rugby. In January 2023, King was announced as the Attack Coach of the Welsh Rugby Union ahead of their Six Nations campaign.
