= Steve Hanley (rugby union) =

England international rugby union player

- Born: Steve Melvyn Hanley; 11 June 1979 (age 47) Whitehaven, Cumbria, England
- Height: 6 ft 4 in (1.93 m)
- Weight: 15 st 13 lb (101 kg)

Rugby union career
- Position: Wing
Amateur team(s)
| Years | Team | Apps | (Points) |
- Aspatria RUFC
Senior career
| Years | Team | Apps | (Points) |
| 1998–2008 | Sale Sharks | 191 | (525) |
- Correct as of 31 December 2007
International career
| Years | Team | Apps | (Points) |
| 1999 | England | 1 | (5) |
- Correct as of 26 Nov 2006 (End of autumn internationals)

Steven Melvyn Hanley (born 11 June 1979) is a former rugby union footballer who played on the wing for the Sale Sharks, signing with the club in 1998. In 1999, Hanley played his only Test for England. He was Sale's "Player of the Year" in 2004. After suffering a back injury in December 2007, Hanley retired in July 2008 after being told by doctors he would not recover well enough to play professional rugby. He scored 104 tries in 191 games, 75 of which were in the Premiership.

== Playing career ==
=== Starting out and early international recognition ===
born 11 June 1979 in Whitehaven, England, Hanley signed with Sale Sharks in 1998. With a Grand Slam on the cards, Hanley was one of two Sale players to make their international debut in England's final match of their 1999 Five Nations campaign along with Barrie-Jon Mather. Although Hanley scored a try, he also was handed-off by Craig Quinnell and suffered a broken arm as Wales won 32–31. It was the only match Hanley would play for the senior England team. It was never explained to him why he was not selected again, although there was speculation that his defence need to be improved. In 2001, he trained with rugby league side St. Helens to improve his defence. Reflecting in 2005 on why he was unable to break into the England team after 1999, Hanley said "They had a settled side under Clive [Woodward] and once you were in, it was hard to get out as the team was winning all the time".

The First Team which had been bought by a local entrepreneur moved from Heywood Road in Sale to Edgeley Park in Stockport in 2003. A mixed season saw Sale win at Welford Road for the first time, and later become the first club to score six tries in a match at the same venue; progress to the final of the Powergen Cup where they were defeated 37–33 by Newcastle Falcons; and fail to qualify for the Heineken Cup. Hanley was named the club's "Player of the Season". Philippe Saint-André joined Sale as their coach in March 2004. Speaking in 2005 of Saint-André's effect on Sale, Hanley noted that "He has brought a lot of different ideas to the club, people have stood up and taken notice of him. He has a special interest in his wingers and has lots of good ideas and little technical things only a player who has played the class of rugby he has would know."

In the final Premiership match of the 2004/05 season, Hanley suffered a broken leg. The injury was sustained in a 22–43 defeat to London Wasps in May as Sale finished third in the league. It forced him to miss the European Challenge Cup Final against Pau, although he had played in every match of the club's campaign. Sale won 27–3, their first piece of silverware since 2002. Hanley scored 15 tries in the season, nine of which were in the Premiership. Sale's back three – made up of Hanley, Mark Cueto, and Jason Robinson – scored more tries than any other club's.

There was a friendly rivalry between Hanley and fellow Sale winger Mark Cueto to see who would finish each season as the club's leading try-scorer. Hanley recovered from his broken leg and returned to first team rugby on 17 August 2005, scoring a try in Sale's 26–23 win over Castres Olympique in the Heineken Cup. In 2006, Hanley was named Sale's "Community Player of the Season". In the 2005–2006 season, Hanley made 8 appearances as Sale Sharks won their first ever Premiership title.

=== Injury and retirement ===
During a Challenge Cup match against Bayonne in December 2007, Hanley suffered a back injury. Unable to recover, in July 2008 he announced his retirement from rugby. In his ten-year career with Sale, he played 191 matches, scoring 104 tries. According to Hanley, "the medical advice is that I will not be able to play Premiership rugby again". He finished his career with 75 Premiership tries, a record at the time surpassed by his great rival at Sale Sharks, Mark Cueto in 2013. The following season, 2008/09, the club held a testimonial for Hanley. He commented that "For me, it's been so nice to get back in touch with everybody. You play with these guys for so long and when you are in a rugby environment they are some of your best mates. But when they drift away you tend to lose contact with people so it has been brilliant to catch up with so many old friends."
