= 1997–98 Premiership 2 =

Rugby union competition in England

- Countries: England
- Champions: Bedford
- Runners-up: West Hartlepool; London Scottish (also promoted)
- Relegated: None
- Matches played: 132
- Top point scorer: 289 – Mike Rayer (Bedford)
- Top try scorer: 17 – Darragh O'Mahony (Moseley), Ben Whetstone (Bedford)

The Premiership 2 was the eleventh full season of rugby union within the second tier of the English league system, currently known as the RFU Championship. New teams to the division included West Hartlepool and Orrell who had been relegated from National Division 1 (renamed as Premiership 1) while Exeter and Fylde were promoted from National League 1 (formerly National Division 3). For the first time Premiership 2, along with Premiership 1, was sponsored by the assurance company Allied Dunbar. For the previous ten seasons the league was known as the Courage Clubs Championship and sponsored by Courage Brewery.

Bedford, the champions, were promoted to the Allied Dunbar Premiership for season 1998–99, along with runner-up West Hartlepool. From next season, the top two divisions would consist of fourteen teams, an increase of two per division. The bottom two teams in the top tier played the third and fourth teams in Premiership 2 for the final two places in the top division. Third place London Scottish won promotion by beating Bristol in a two legged play-off, while fourth placed Rotherham lost to London Irish. There was no relegation to Jewson National League 1 because of the increase in teams in the top two divisions.

== Participating teams ==
Locations of the 1997–98 Premiership 2 teams

| Team | Stadium | Capacity | City/Area | Previous season |
|---|---|---|---|---|
| Bedford | Goldington Road | 6,500 | Bedford, Bedfordshire | 4th (lost playoff) |
| Blackheath | Rectory Field | 3,500 (500 seats) | Greenwich, London | 10th |
| Coventry | Coundon Road | 10,000 (1,100 seats) | Coventry, West Midlands | 3rd (lost playoff) |
| Exeter | County Ground | 5,750 (750 seats) | Exeter, Devon | Promoted from National 3 (1st) |
| Fylde | Woodlands | 7,500 (500 seats) | Lytham St Annes, Lancashire | Promoted from National 3 (2nd) |
| London Scottish | Athletic Ground | 7,300 (1,300 seats) | Richmond, London | 5th |
| Moseley | The Reddings | 9,999 (1,800 seats) | Birmingham, West Midlands | 8th |
| Orrell | Edge Hall Road | 5,300 (300 seats) | Orrell, Greater Manchester | Relegated from National 1 (12th) |
| Rotherham | Clifton Lane | 2,500 | Rotherham, South Yorkshire | 7th |
| Wakefield | College Grove | 4,000 (500 seats) | Wakefield, West Yorkshire | 6th |
| Waterloo | St Anthony's Road | 9,950 (950 seats) | Blundellsands, Merseyside | 9th |
| West Hartlepool | Victoria Park | 7,856 | Hartlepool, County Durham | Relegated from National 1 (11th) |

== Final table ==
1997–98 Premiership 2 table
| Pos | Team | Pld | W | D | L | PF | PA | PD | Pts | Qualification |
|---|---|---|---|---|---|---|---|---|---|---|
| 1 | Bedford (C) | 22 | 20 | 0 | 2 | 791 | 365 | +426 | 38 (Note: Two points deducted for fielding three overseas players) | Promoted |
| 2 | West Hartlepool | 22 | 15 | 1 | 6 | 617 | 431 | +186 | 31 | Promoted |
| 3 | London Scottish | 22 | 14 | 1 | 7 | 517 | 404 | +113 | 29 | Promoted |
| 4 | Rotherham | 22 | 14 | 0 | 8 | 566 | 386 | +180 | 28 | |
| 5 | Orrell | 22 | 12 | 0 | 10 | 533 | 400 | +133 | 24 | |
| 6 | Moseley | 22 | 11 | 1 | 10 | 478 | 421 | +57 | 23 | |
| 7 | Coventry | 22 | 11 | 1 | 10 | 444 | 532 | −88 | 23 | |
| 8 | Waterloo | 22 | 11 | 0 | 11 | 510 | 525 | −15 | 22 | |
| 9 | Blackheath | 22 | 8 | 0 | 14 | 474 | 621 | −147 | 16 | |
| 10 | Wakefield | 22 | 6 | 0 | 16 | 382 | 556 | −174 | 12 | |
| 11 | Exeter | 22 | 6 | 0 | 16 | 334 | 553 | −219 | 12 | |
| 12 | Fylde | 22 | 2 | 0 | 20 | 258 | 710 | −452 | 4 | |

Source: moseleyrugby.co.uk at the Wayback Machine (archived 2016-03-08)
Rules for classification: Points are awarded as follows: two points for a win; one point for a draw; no points for a loss.

If teams are level at any stage, tiebreakers are applied in the following order: (1) difference between points for and against; (2) total number of points for.

There was no relegation this season.
(C) Champions

== Results ==
=== Round 1 ===
30 August 1997

| Bedford | 18 – 11 | Rotherham |
| | Report |

Goldington Road

30 August 1997

| Coventry | 20 – 12 | Moseley |
| | Report |

Coundon Road

30 August 1997

| London Scottish | 35 – 9 | Fylde |
| | Report |

Richmond Athletic Ground

30 August 1997

| Orrell | 26 – 17 | Blackheath |
| | Report |

Edge Hall Road

30 August 1997

| Wakefield | 15 – 19 | Exeter |
| | Report |

College Grove

30 August 1997

| West Hartlepool | 19 – 21 | Waterloo |
| | Report |

Victoria Park

=== Round 2 ===
7 September 1997

| Coventry | 29 – 8 | Exeter |

Coundon Road

7 September 1997

| London Scottish | 34 – 6 | Blackheath |

Richmond Athletic Ground

7 September 1997

| Moseley | P – P | Fylde |

The Reddings

- match postponed and rescheduled to 25 April 1998.

7 September 1997

| Waterloo | 30 – 18 | Wakefield |

St Anthony's Road

7 September 1997

| West Hartlepool | P – P | Bedford |

Victoria Park

- match postponed and rescheduled to 2 May 1998.

7 September 1997

| Orrell | P – P | Rotherham |

Edge Hall Road

- match postponed and rescheduled to 18 April 1998.

=== Round 3 ===
13 September 1997

| Blackheath | 29 – 27 | Wakefield |
| | Report |

Rectory Field

13 September 1997

| Exeter | 17 – 32 | Bedford |
| | Report |

County Ground

13 September 1997

| Fylde | 15 – 23 | Coventry |
| | Report |

Woodlands

13 September 1997

| Moseley | 16 – 21 | West Hartlepool |
| | Report |

The Reddings

13 September 1997

| Waterloo | 17 – 36 | London Scottish |
| | Report |

St Anthony's Road

14 September 1997

| Rotherham | 14 – 29 | Orrell |
| | Report |

Clifton Lane

=== Round 4 ===
20 September 1997

| Bedford | 45 – 33 | London Scottish |
| | Report |

Goldington Road

20 September 1997

| Blackheath | 50 – 16 | Fylde |
| | Report |

Rectory Field

20 September 1997

| Exeter | 24 – 20 | Waterloo |
| | Report |

County Ground

20 September 1997

| Orrell | 30 – 19 | Moseley |
| | Report |

Edge Hall Road

20 September 1997

| Rotherham | 33 – 21 | West Hartlepool |
| | Report |

Clifton Lane

20 September 1997

| Wakefield | 6 – 17 | Coventry |
| | Report |

College Grove

=== Round 5 ===
27 September 1997

| Coventry | 15 – 22 | Bedford |
| | Report |

Coundon Road

27 September 1997

| Fylde | 18 – 25 | Rotherham |
| | Report |

Woodlands

27 September 1997

| London Scottish | 20 – 19 | Orrell |
| | Report |

Richmond Athletic Ground

27 September 1997

| Moseley | 23 – 22 | Exeter |
| | Report |

The Reddings

27 September 1997

| Waterloo | 51 – 16 | Blackheath |
| | Report |

St Anthony's Road

27 September 1997

| West Hartlepool | 31 – 20 | Wakefield |
| | Report |

Victoria Park

=== Round 6 ===
4 October 1997

| Bedford | 34 – 21 | Waterloo |
| | Report |

Goldington Road

4 October 1997

| Blackheath | 28 – 27 | Coventry |
| | Report |

Rectory Field

4 October 1997

| Exeter | 19 – 20 | West Hartlepool |
| | Report |

County Ground

4 October 1997

| Orrell | 35 – 9 | Fylde |
| | Report |

Edge Hall Road

4 October 1997

| Rotherham | 24 – 3 | London Scottish |
| | Report |

Clifton Lane

4 October 1997

| Wakefield | 15 – 27 | Moseley |
| | Report |

College Grove

=== Round 7 ===
11 October 1997

| Coventry | 18 – 12 | Rotherham |
| | Report |

Coundon Road

11 October 1997

| Fylde | 18 – 10 | Exeter |
| | Report |

Woodlands

11 October 1997

| London Scottish | 30 – 13 | Wakefield |
| | Report |

Richmond Athletic Ground

11 October 1997

| Moseley | 16 – 35 | Bedford |
| | Report |

The Reddings

11 October 1997

| Waterloo | 25 – 14 | Orrell |
| | Report |

St Anthony's Road

11 October 1997

| West Hartlepool | 32 – 21 | Blackheath |
| | Report |

Victoria Park

=== Round 8 ===
18 October 1997

| Bedford | 22 – 9 | West Hartlepool |
| | Report |

Goldington Road

18 October 1997

| Blackheath | 11 – 9 | Moseley |
| | Report |

Rectory Field

18 October 1997

| Exeter | 16 – 22 | London Scottish |
| | Report |

County Ground

18 October 1997

| Orrell | 38 – 13 | Coventry |
| | Report |

Edge Hall Road

18 October 1997

| Rotherham | 16 – 26 | Waterloo |
| | Report |

Clifton Lane

18 October 1997

| Wakefield | 35 – 17 | Fylde |
| | Report |

College Grove

=== Round 9 ===
25 October 1997

| Coventry | 24 – 17 | Wakefield |
| | Report |

Coundon Road

25 October 1997

| Fylde | 6 – 31 | Blackheath |
| | Report |

Woodlands

25 October 1997

| London Scottish | 15 – 22 | Bedford |
| | Report |

Richmond Athletic Ground

25 October 1997

| Moseley | 18 – 9 | Orrell |
| | Report |

The Reddings

25 October 1997

| Waterloo | 44 – 13 | Exeter |
| | Report |

St Anthony's Road

25 October 1997

| West Hartlepool | 22 – 21 | Rotherham |
| | Report |

Victoria Park

=== Round 10 ===
8 November 1997

| Bedford | 77 – 3 | Coventry |
| | Report |

Goldington Road

8 November 1997

| Blackheath | 14 – 15 | Waterloo |
| | Report |

Rectory Field

8 November 1997

| Exeter | 10 – 20 | Moseley |
| | Report |

County Ground

8 November 1997

| Orrell | 13 – 27 | London Scottish |
| | Report |

Edge Hall Road

8 November 1997

| Rotherham | 32 – 16 | Fylde |
| | Report |

Clifton Lane

8 November 1997

| Wakefield | 12 – 28 | West Hartlepool |
| | Report |

College Grove

=== Round 11 ===
13 December 1997

| Coventry | 24 – 22 | Blackheath |
| | Report |

Coundon Road

13 December 1997

| Fylde | 9 – 21 | Orrell |
| | Report |

Woodlands

13 December 1997

| London Scottish | 35 – 29 | Rotherham |
| | Report |

Richmond Athletic Ground

13 December 1997

| Moseley | 28 – 10 | Wakefield |
| | Report |

13 December 1997

| Waterloo | 14 – 28 | Bedford |
| | Report |

St Anthony's Road

13 December 1997

| West Hartlepool | 34 – 14 | Exeter |
| | Report |

Victoria Park

=== Round 12 ===
20 December 1997

| Bedford | 32 – 16 | Moseley |
| | Report |

Goldington Road

20 December 1997

| Blackheath | 25 – 22 | West Hartlepool |
| | Report |

Rectory Field

20 December 1997

| Exeter | 24 – 15 | Fylde |
| | Report |

County Ground

20 December 1997

| Orrell | 23 – 6 | Waterloo |
| | Report |

Edge Hall Road

20 December 1997

| Rotherham | 46 – 8 | Coventry |
| | Report |

Clifton Lane

20 December 1997

| Wakefield | 15 – 10 | London Scottish |
| | Report |

College Grove

=== Round 13 ===
27 December 1997

| Coventry | P – P | Orrell |

- postponed, match rescheduled to 24 January 1998.

27 December 1997

| Fylde | 7 – 67 | Bedford |
| | Report |

Woodlands

27 December 1997

| London Scottish | P – P | Exeter |

- postponed, match rescheduled to 24 January 1998.

27 December 1997

| Moseley | 23 – 25 | Rotherham |
| | Report |

The Reddings

27 December 1997

| Wakefield | P – P | Blackheath |

- postponed, match rescheduled to 18 April 1998.

27 December 1997

| Waterloo | P – P | West Hartlepool |

- postponed, match rescheduled to 11 April 1998.

=== Rescheduled match ===
10 January 1998

| Waterloo | 26 – 32 | Rotherham |
| | Report |

St Anthony's Road

=== Round 14 ===
17 January 1998

| Bedford | 50 – 14 | Fylde |
| | Report |

Goldington Road

17 January 1998

| Blackheath | 34 – 25 | London Scottish |
| | Report |

Rectory Field

17 January 1998

| Exeter | 18 – 14 | Coventry |
| | Report |

County Ground

17 January 1998

| Orrell | 30 – 35 | West Hartlepool |
| | Report |

Edge Hall Road

17 January 1998

| Rotherham | 10 – 16 | Moseley |
| | Report |

Clifton Lane

17 January 1998

| Wakefield | 23 – 20 | Waterloo |
| | Report |

College Grove

=== Round 13 (rescheduled matches) ===
24 January 1998

| Coventry | 21 – 30 | Orrell |
| | Report |

Coundon Road

24 January 1998

| London Scottish | 22 – 10 | Exeter |
| | Report |

Richmond Athletic

=== Round 15 ===
31 January 1998

| Bedford | 47 – 22 | Orrell |
| | Report |

Goldington Road

31 January 1998

| Coventry | 21 – 16 | West Hartlepool |
| | Report |

Coundon Road

31 January 1998

| Exeter | 20 – 18 | Blackheath |
| | Report |

County Ground

31 January 1998

| Fylde | 10 – 25 | Waterloo |
| | Report |

Woodlands

31 January 1998

| Moseley | 18 – 29 | London Scottish |
| | Report |

The Reddings

31 January 1998

| Rotherham | 41 – 9 | Wakefield |
| | Report |

=== Round 16 ===
14 February 1998

| Blackheath | 18 – 31 | Rotherham |
| | Report |

Rectory Field

14 February 1998

| London Scottish | 18 – 18 | Coventry |
| | Report |

Richmond Athletic Ground

14 February 1998

| Orrell | 38 – 3 | Exeter |
| | Report |

Edge Hall Road

14 February 1998

| Wakefield | 13 – 24 | Bedford |
| | Report |

College Grove

14 February 1998

| Waterloo | 36 – 31 | Moseley |
| | Report |

St Anthony's Road

14 February 1998

| West Hartlepool | 66 – 12 | Fylde |
| | Report |

Victoria Park

=== Rescheduled match ===
21 February 1998

| West Hartlepool | 20 – 11 | Orrell |
| | Report |

Edge Hall Road

=== Rescheduled matches ===
28 February 1998

| Fylde | 10 – 30 | Wakefield |
| | Report |

Woodlands

28 February 1998

| Moseley | 29 – 16 | Blackheath |
| | Report |

The Reddings

=== Round 17 ===
7 March 1998

| Blackheath | 13 – 37 | Bedford |
| | Report |

Rectory Field

7 March 1998

| Coventry | 41 – 33 | Waterloo |
| | Report |

Coundon Road

7 March 1998

| Exeter | 8 – 33 | Rotherham |
| | Report |

County Ground

7 March 1998

| Fylde | P – P | Moseley |

- postponed, match rescheduled to 4 April 1998.

7 March 1998

| Wakefield | 20 – 26 | Orrell |
| | Report |

College Grove

8 March 1998

| London Scottish | 31 – 17 | West Hartlepool |
| | Report |

Richmond Athletic Ground

=== Round 18 ===
14 March 1998

| Bedford | 36 – 10 | Wakefield |
| | Report |

Goldington Road

14 March 1998

| Coventry | 37 – 10 | London Scottish |
| | Report |

Coundon Road

14 March 1998

| Exeter | 17 – 14 | Orrell |
| | Report |

County Ground

14 March 1998

| Fylde | 8 – 34 | West Hartlepool |
| | Report |

Woodlands

14 March 1998

| Moseley | 23 – 22 | Waterloo |
| | Report |

The Reddings

14 March 1998

| Rotherham | 40 – 10 | Blackheath |
| | Report |

Clifton Lane

=== Round 19 ===
28 March 1998

| Blackheath | 26 – 15 | Exeter |
| | Report |

Rectory Field

28 March 1998

| London Scottish | 24 – 18 | Moseley |
| | Report |

Richmond Athletic Ground

28 March 1998

| Orrell | 16 – 29 | Bedford |
| | Report |

Edge Hall Road

28 March

| Wakefield | 15 – 14 | Rotherham |
| | Report |

College Grove

28 March 1998

| Waterloo | 22 – 12 | Fylde |
| | Report |

St Anthony's Road

28 March

| West Hartlepool | 42 – 31 | Coventry |
| | Report |

Victoria Park

=== Round 17 (rescheduled match) ===
4 April 1998

| Fylde | 14 – 13 | Moseley |
| | Report |

Woodlands

=== Round 20 (including postponed match from round 13) ===
11 April 1998

| Blackheath | 14 – 32 | Orrell |
| | Report |

Rectory Field

11 April 1998

| Exeter | 17 – 30 | Wakefield |
| | Report |

County Ground

11 April 1998

| Fylde | 7 – 22 | London Scottish |
| | Report |

Woodlands

11 April 1998

| Moseley | P – P | Coventry |

The Reddings

- postponed, match rescheduled to 22 April 1998.

11 April 1998

| Rotherham | 18 – 17 | Bedford |
| | Report |

Clifton Lane

11 April 1998

| Waterloo | 6 – 51 | West Hartlepool |
| | Report |

St Anthony's Road

- match rescheduled from round 13.

=== Round 21 (including postponed matches from rounds 2 & 13) ===
April 18

| Bedford | 16 – 3 | Exeter |
| | Report |

Goldington Road

April 18

| Coventry | 16 – 7 | Fylde |
| | Report |

Coundon Road

April 18

| London Scottish | 26 – 6 | Waterloo |
| | Report |

Richmond Athletic Ground

April 18

| Orrell | 3 – 9 | Rotherham |
| | Report |

Edge Hall Road

- match rescheduled from round 2.

April 18

| Wakefield | 21 – 24 | Blackheath |
| | Report |

College Grove

- match rescheduled from round 13.

April 18

| West Hartlepool | 18 – 18 | Moseley |
| | Report |

Victoria Park

=== Round 20 (rescheduled match) ===
April 22

| Moseley | 31 – 3 | Coventry |
| | Report |

The Reddings

=== Round 22 ===
25 April 1998

| Bedford | 72 – 31 | Blackheath |
| | Report |

Goldington Road

25 April 1998

| Moseley | 44 – 9 | Fylde |
| | Report |

The Reddings

25 April 1998

| Orrell | 54 – 8 | Wakefield |
| | Report |

Edge Hall Road

25 April 1998

| Rotherham | 50 –27 | Exeter |
| | Report |

Clifton Lane

25 April 1998

| Waterloo | 24 – 21 | Coventry |
| | Report |

St Anthony's Road

25 April 1998

| West Hartlepool | 11 – 10 | London Scottish |
| | Report |

Victoria Park

=== Round 2 (rescheduled match) ===
2 May 1998

| West Hartlepool | 48 – 29 | Bedford |
| | Report |

Brierton Lane

== Individual statistics ==
- Note that points scorers includes tries as well as conversions, penalties and drop goals.

=== Top points scorers ===
| Rank | Player | Team | Appearances | Points |
|---|---|---|---|---|
| 1 | (Wales) Mike Rayer | Bedford | 21 | 289 |
| 2 | (England) Lyndon Griffiths | Waterloo | 22 | 263 |
| 3 | (England) Simon Binns | Rotherham | 22 | 244 |
| 4 | (New Zealand) Steven Vile | West Hartlepool | 17 | 238 |
| 5 | (England) Matt Jones | Moseley | 17 | 176 |
| 6 | (England) John Fabian | Exeter | 22 | 174 |
| 7 | (England) Simon Verbickas | Orrell | 18 | 170 |
| 8 | (Scotland) Derrick Lee | London Scottish | 15 | 154 |
| 9 | (England) Greg Miller | Wakefield | 14 | 141 |
| 10 | (England) Jez Harris | Coventry | 14 | 133 |

=== Top try scorers ===
| Rank | Player | Team | Appearances | Tries |
|---|---|---|---|---|
| 1 | (England) Ben Whetstone | Bedford | 19 | 17 |
| 1 | (Ireland) Darragh O'Mahony | Moseley | 20 | 17 |
| 2 | (Scotland) Conan Sharman | London Scottish | 20 | 14 |
| 2 | (Wales) Jason Forster | Bedford | 21 | 14 |
| 3 | (Samoa) John Clarke | Blackheath | 14 | 13 |
| 3 | (England) Simon Verbickas | Orrell | 18 | 13 |
| 4 | (Australia) Greg Austin | Rotherham | 17 | 12 |
| 5 | (Ireland) Emmet Farrell | West Hartlepool | 22 | 11 |
| 6 | (New Zealand) Steven Vile | West Hartlepool | 17 | 8 |
| 6 | (England) Simon Binns | Rotherham | 22 | 8 |

== Season records ==
=== Team ===
Largest home win — 74 pts

77 – 3 Bedford at home to Coventry on 8 November 1997

Largest away win — 60 pts

67 – 7 Bedford away to Fylde on 27 December 1997

Most points scored — 151 pts

77 – 3 Bedford at home to Coventry on 8 November 1997

Most tries in a match — 11

Bedford Blues at home to Coventry on 8 November 1997

Most conversions in a match — 8 (x3)

Bedford at home to Coventry on 8 November 1997
Bedford away to Fylde on 27 December 1997
West Hartlepool at home to Fylde on 14 February 1998

Most penalties in a match — 6 (x9)

N/A - multiple teams

Most drop goals in a match — 2 (x4)

Exeter at home to Bedford on 13 September 1997
Moseley at home to Orrell on 25 October 1997
Coventry at home to West Hartlepool on 31 January 1998
Wakefield at home to Rotherham on 28 March 1998

=== Player ===
Most points in a match — 32

(Wales) Mike Rayer for Bedford at home to Coventry on 8 November 1997

Most tries in a match — 4 (x3)

(Samoa) John Clarke for Blackheath at home to Fylde on 20 September 1997
(Wales) Jason Forster for Bedford at home to Fylde on 17 January 1998
(England) Ben Wade for Rotherham at home to Exeter on 25 April 1998

Most conversions in a match — 8 (x3)

(Wales) Mike Rayer for Bedford at home to Coventry on 8 November 1997
(Wales) Mike Rayer for Bedford away to Fylde on 27 December 1997
(Australia) Steven Vile for West Hartlepool at home to Fylde on 14 February 1998

Most penalties in a match — 6 (x9)

N/A - multiple players

Most drop goals in a match — 2 (x3)

(Zambia) Meeku Patidar for Exeter at home to Bedford on 13 September 1997
(England) Matt Jones for Moseley at home to Orrell on 25 October 1997
(England) Greg Miller for Wakefield at home to Rotherham on 28 March 1998

=== Attendances ===
- Note that attendances were very poorly documented this season and there is no information available

Highest — N/A

N/A

Lowest — N/A

N/A

Highest Average Attendance — N/A

N/A

Lowest Average Attendance — N/A

N/A

== See also ==
- 1997–98 Premiership 1
- 1997–98 National League 1
- 1997–98 National League 2 North
- 1997–98 National League 2 South
