= 1996–97 National Division 2 =

Rugby union competition in England

- Countries: England
- Date: 7 September 1996 – 11 May 1997
- Champions: Richmond (1st title)
- Runners-up: Newcastle Falcons
- Relegated: Rugby Lions; Nottingham
- Matches played: 132
- Highest attendance: 8,000 – Coventry v Newcastle (2 November 1996)
- Top point scorer: 334 – Simon Mason (Richmond)
- Top try scorer: 23 – John Bentley (Newcastle)

The 1996–97 National Division 2 (sponsored by Courage Brewery) was the tenth season of the top tier of the English rugby union league system, the Courage Clubs Championship, currently known as Champ Rugby, and was the first season that saw professional rugby openly introduced into the English game. It was also the tenth and final season of sponsorship by Courage. New sides to the division included Richmond, Coventry, Rugby Lions and Rotherham (all promoted from tier 3) and there had been no teams relegated from tier 1 due to league restructuring.

The top two teams, Richmond and Newcastle Falcons were automatically promoted to the new look 1997–98 Premiership 1 (formerly National Division 1), and for the first time there were play–offs between the third and fourth placed teams, and the ninth and tenth placed teams in Division One, which meant 2 to 4 teams could be promoted/relegated between the divisions. The Division 2 sides played at home first with the winners of the two matches, on aggregate score, playing in the top division the following season. Coventry and Bedford both failed to win promotion.

At the end other end of the table, Rugby Lions and Nottingham were relegated to the newly named 1997–98 National League 1 (formerly National Division 3). Last season Nottingham finished in the bottom two and escaped relegation due to the division being increased from ten clubs to twelve clubs. This season they were not so lucky and next season will be their first in Division Three.

== Structure ==
Restructuring from the previous season increased the division from ten to twelve teams with each side playing one another twice, in a round robin system, home and away, to make a total of twenty-two matches for each team.

The reorganisation of the Courage Clubs Championship for the following season by the RFU meant there would be between two to four sides promoted to the new look Premiership 1. Sides finishing 1st and 2nd would be automatically promoted while sides finishing 3rd and 4th would be involved in a promotion/relegation playoff against the 9th and 10th ranked sides from the 1996–97 National Division 1 with 4th v 9th and 3rd v 10th.

== Participating teams ==
Locations of the 1996–97 National Division 2 teams

Team	Stadium	Capacity	City/Area	Previous season
Bedford	Goldington Road	6,500 (Note: Goldington Road ground capacity up to 6,500 from 4,800 for 1996–97 season with a capacity crowd achieved versus Newcastle Gosforth on 5 April 1997..)	Bedford, Bedfordshire	10th (no relegation)
Blackheath	Rectory Field	3,500 (500 seats)	Greenwich, London	7th
Coventry	Coundon Road	10,000 (1,100 seats)	Coventry, West Midlands	Promoted from National 3 (1st)
London Scottish	Athletic Ground	7,300 (1,300 seats)	Richmond, London	3rd
Moseley	The Reddings	9,999 (1,800 seats)	Birmingham, West Midlands	6th
Newcastle (Note: Formerly known as Newcastle Gosforth, the club changed their name to Newcastle ahead of the 1996–97 season.)	Kingston Park	6,600	Newcastle upon Tyne, Tyne and Wear	8th
Nottingham	Ireland Avenue	4,990 (590 seats)	Beeston, Nottinghamshire	9th (No relegation)
Richmond	Athletic Ground	7,300 (1,300 seats)	Richmond, London	Promoted from National 3 (2nd)
Rotherham	Clifton Lane	2,500	Rotherham, South Yorkshire	Promoted from National 3 (4th)
Rugby	Webb Ellis Road	3,200 (200 seats)	Rugby, Warwickshire	Promoted from National 3 (3rd)
Wakefield	College Grove	4,000 (500 seats)	Wakefield, West Yorkshire	4th
Waterloo	St Anthony's Road	9,950 (950 seats)	Blundellsands, Merseyside	5th

== Table ==
1996–97 National Division 2 table
Pos	Team	Pld	W	D	L	PF	PA	PD	Pts	Qualification
1	Richmond (C)	22	19	2	1	986	410	+576	40	Promoted
2	Newcastle Falcons	22	19	1	2	1255	346	+909	39	Promoted
3	Coventry	22	16	1	5	738	394	+344	33	Promotion play–offs
4	Bedford	22	15	0	7	720	482	+238	30	Promotion play–offs
5	London Scottish	22	11	0	11	549	568	−19	22	
6	Wakefield	22	11	0	11	504	557	−53	22	
7	Rotherham	22	10	0	12	525	661	−136	20	
8	Moseley	22	9	0	13	492	741	−249	18	
9	Waterloo	22	8	0	14	506	661	−155	16	
10	Blackheath	22	7	0	15	412	641	−229	14	
11	Rugby Lions	22	3	0	19	317	1060	−743	6	Relegated
12	Nottingham	22	2	0	20	344	827	−483	4	Relegated

Rules for classification: Points are awarded as follows:
1. two points for a win
2. one point for a draw
3. no points for a loss

If teams are level at any stage, tiebreakers are applied in the following order:

1. difference between points for and against
2. total number of points for
  (C) Champions

== Fixtures & Results ==
=== Round 1 ===
7 September 1996

Bedford	41 – 23	Nottingham

Goldington Road

7 September 1996

Blackheath	44 – 5	Rotherham

Rectory Field

7 September 1996

Coventry	16 – 16	Richmond

Coundon Road

7 September 1996

London Scottish	43 – 7	Rugby Lions

Athletic Ground

7 September 1996

Moseley	17 – 30	Wakefield

The Reddings

7 September 1996

Newcastle	30 – 13	Waterloo

Kingston Park
Attendance: 1,400

=== Round 2 ===
14 September 1996

Blackheath	11 – 3	Bedford

Rectory Field

14 September 1996

Nottingham	29 – 74	Newcastle

Ireland Avenue

14 September 1996

Richmond	64 – 38	Rotherham

Athletic Ground

14 September 1996

Rugby Lions	3 – 61	Coventry

Webb Ellis Road

14 September 1996

Wakefield	27 – 30	London Scottish

College Grove

14 September 1996

Waterloo	20 – 13	Moseley

St Anthony's Road

=== Round 3 ===
21 September 1996

Bedford	17 – 44	Richmond

Goldington Road

21 September 1996

Coventry	24 – 25	Wakefield

Coundon Road

21 September 1996

London Scottish	42 – 30	Waterloo

Athletic Ground

21 September 1996

Moseley	34 – 22	Nottingham

The Reddings

21 September 1996

Newcastle	61 – 0	Blackheath

Kingston Park

21 September 1996

Rotherham	49 – 18	Rugby Lions

Clifton Lane

=== Round 4 ===
28 September 1996

Blackheath	28 – 3	Moseley

Rectory Field

28 September 1996

Nottingham	12 – 26	London Scottish

Ireland Avenue

28 September 1996

Richmond	20 – 20	Newcastle

Athletic Ground
Attendance: 7,000

28 September 1996

Wakefield	25 – 29	Rotherham

College Grove

28 September 1996

Waterloo	17 – 36	Coventry

St Anthony's Road

29 September 1996

Rugby Lions	6 – 34	Bedford

Webb Ellis Road

=== Round 5 ===
5 October 1996

Bedford	25 – 19	Wakefield

Goldington Road

5 October 1996

Coventry	102 – 22	Nottingham

Coundon Road
Referee: Nigel Yates

5 October 1996

London Scottish	23 – 31	Blackheath

Athletic Ground

5 October 1996

Moseley	15 – 87	Richmond

The Reddings

5 October 1996

Newcastle	156 – 5	Rugby Lions

Kingston Park

5 October 1996

Rotherham	38 – 23	Waterloo

Clifton Lane

=== Round 6 ===
12 October 1996

Blackheath	10 – 16	Coventry

Rectory Field

12 October 1996

Nottingham	21 – 44	Rotherham

Ireland Avenue

12 October 1996

Richmond	54 – 13	London Scottish

Athletic Ground

12 October 1996

Rugby Lions	29 – 22	Moseley

Webb Ellis Road

12 October 1996

Wakefield	17 – 47	Newcastle

College Grove

12 October 1996

Waterloo	11 – 34	Bedford

St Anthony's Road

=== Round 7 ===
19 October 1996

Bedford	44 – 30	Rotherham

Goldington Road

19 October 1996

Coventry	66 – 6	London Scottish

Coundon Road

19 October 1996

Moseley	9 – 75	Newcastle

The Reddings

19 October 1996

Nottingham	12 – 22	Blackheath

Ireland Avenue

19 October 1996

Richmond	64 – 8	Rugby Lions

Athletic Ground

19 October 1996

Wakefield	45 – 12	Waterloo

College Grove

=== Round 8 ===
26 October 1996

Blackheath	21 – 40	Richmond

Rectory Field

26 October 1996

London Scottish	42 – 10	Moseley

Athletic Ground

26 October 1996

Newcastle	49 – 12	Bedford

Kingston Park

26 October 1996

Rotherham	11 – 42	Coventry

Clifton Lane

26 October 1996

Rugby Lions	17 – 22	Wakefield

Webb Ellis Road

26 October 1996

Waterloo	19 – 20	Nottingham

St Anthony's Road

=== Round 9 ===
2 November 1996

Bedford	64 – 9	Moseley

Goldington Road

2 November 1996

Blackheath	24 – 33	Rugby Lions

Rectory Field

2 November 1996

Coventry	19 – 18	Newcastle
	Report

Coundon Road
Attendance: 8,000 (Note: Attendance figures for Coventry v Newcastle on 2 November vary. The match report by the Independent gave a crowd figure of 8,000, while others ranged from 7,500 to 9,000. A video recording appeared to show a full capacity crowd, and given that Coundon Road had a capacity of around 10,000 the crowd is likely to be higher.)
Referee: Neil Cousins

2 November 1996

Nottingham	18 – 40	Wakefield

Ireland Avenue

2 November 1996

Richmond	64 – 13	Waterloo

Athletic Ground

2 November 1996

Rotherham	28 – 18	London Scottish

Clifton Lane

=== Round 10 ===
9 November 1996

London Scottish	26 – 27	Bedford

Athletic Ground

9 November 1996

Moseley	19 – 35	Coventry

The Reddings

9 November 1996

Rotherham	P – P	Newcastle

Clifton Lane

- Postponed due to Newcastle requesting game be switched due to international call-ups. Game rescheduled to 5 May 1997. (Note: The Rugby Archive listed this fixture as an 18 –9 victory at home for Rotherham versus Moseley. This was incorrect as Moseley were at home to Coventry on the same date (9 November 1996) and the reverse fixture had Newcastle playing against Rotherham on 19 April 1997. The Independent article finally cleared things up.)

9 November 1996

Rugby Lions	20 – 12	Nottingham

Webb Ellis

9 November 1996

Wakefield	7 – 23	Richmond

College Grove

9 November 1996

Waterloo	16 – 10	Blackheath

St Anthony's Road

=== Round 11 ===
16 November 1996

Bedford	30 – 23	Coventry

Goldington Road

16 November 1996

Blackheath	13 – 17	Wakefield

Rectory Field

16 November 1996

London Scottish	12 – 28	Newcastle

Athletic Ground

16 November 1996

Nottingham	5 – 70	Richmond

Ireland Avenue

16 November 1996

Rotherham	18 – 9 (Note: The Rugby Archive lists the wrong opponent (Blackheath) and score (39 – 11) for Rotherham's home game on the 16 November 1996. The result from the Rotherham Titans website has been used instead.)	Moseley

Clifton Lane

16 November 1996

Rugby Lions	15 – 56	Waterloo

Webb Ellis Road

=== Round 12 ===
28 December 1996

Nottingham	13 – 36	Bedford

Ireland Avenue

28 December 1996

Richmond	39 – 10	Coventry

Athletic Ground

28 December 1996

Rotherham	39 – 11 (Note: The Rugby Archive gives this result on the wrong date - the correct date is taken from the Rotherham Titans results page.)	Blackheath

Clifton Lane

28 December 1996

Rugby Lions	P – P	London Scottish

Webb Ellis Road

- Postponed. Game rescheduled to 29 March 1997.

28 December 1996

Wakefield	P – P	Moseley

College Grove

- Postponed. Game rescheduled to 29 March 1997.

28 December 1996

Waterloo	P – P	Newcastle

St Anthony's Road

- Postponed. Game rescheduled to 30 April 1997.

=== Round 13 ===
4 January 1997

Bedford	P – P	Blackheath

Goldington Road

- Postponed. Game rescheduled to 22 February 1997.

4 January 1997

Coventry	P – P	Rugby Lions

Coundon Road

- Postponed. Game rescheduled to 22 February 1997.

4 January 1997

London Scottish	P – P	Wakefield

Athletic Ground

- Postponed. Game rescheduled to 31 March 1997.

4 January 1997

Moseley	P – P	Waterloo

The Reddings

- Postponed. Game rescheduled to 22 February 1997.

4 January 1997

Newcastle	P – P	Nottingham

Kingston Park

- Postponed. Game rescheduled to 16 March 1997.

4 January 1997

Rotherham	P – P	Richmond

Clifton Lane

- Postponed. Game rescheduled to 22 February 1997.

=== Round 14 ===
11 January 1997

Blackheath	P – P	Newcastle

Rectory Field

- Postponed. Game rescheduled to 16 April 1997.

11 January 1997

Nottingham	P – P	Moseley

Ireland Avenue

- Postponed. Game rescheduled to 2 February 1997.

11 January 1997

Richmond	P – P	Bedford

Athletic Ground

- Postponed. Game rescheduled to 25 January 1997.

11 January 1997

Rugby Lions	P – P	Rotherham

Webb Ellis Road

- Postponed. Game rescheduled to 15 March 1997.

11 January 1997

Wakefield	P – P	Coventry

College Grove

- Postponed. Game rescheduled to 3 May 1997.

11 January 1997

Waterloo	P – P	London Scottish

St Anthony's Road

- Postponed. Game rescheduled to 3 May 1997.

=== Round 15 ===
18 January 1997

Bedford	57 – 6	Rugby Lions

Goldington Road

18 January 1997

Coventry	28 – 16	Waterloo

Coundon Road

18 January 1997

London Scottish	33 – 10	Nottingham

Athletic Ground

18 January 1997

Moseley	21 – 18	Blackheath

The Reddings

18 January 1997

Newcastle	P – P	Richmond

Kingston Park

- Postponed. Game rescheduled to 29 March 1997.

18 January 1997

Rotherham	12 – 19	Wakefield

Clifton Lane

=== Round 14 (rescheduled games) ===
25 January 1997

Richmond	34 – 33	Bedford

Athletic Ground

- Game rescheduled from 11 January 1997.

2 February 1997

Nottingham	11 – 22	Moseley

Ireland Avenue

- Game rescheduled from 11 January 1997.

=== Round 16 ===
8 February 1997

Blackheath	13 – 19	London Scottish

Rectory Field

8 February 1997

Nottingham	0 – 29	Coventry

Ireland Avenue

8 February 1997

Richmond	37 – 27	Moseley

Athletic Ground

8 February 1997

Rugby Lions	8 – 70	Newcastle

Webb Ellis Road

8 February 1997

Wakefield	17 – 29	Bedford

College Grove

8 February 1997

Waterloo	23 – 27	Rotherham

St Anthony's Road

=== Round 13 (rescheduled games) ===
22 February 1997

Bedford	72 – 18	Blackheath

Goldington Road

- Game rescheduled from 4 January 1997.

22 February 1997

Moseley	17 – 13	Waterloo

The Reddings

- Game rescheduled from 4 January 1997.

22 February 1997

Rotherham	6 – 28	Richmond

Clifton Lane

- Game rescheduled from 4 January 1997.

23 January 1997

Coventry	24 – 10	Rugby Lions

Coundon Road

- Game rescheduled from 4 January 1997.

=== Round 17 ===
8 March 1997

Bedford	38 – 6	Waterloo

Goldington Road

8 March 1997

Coventry	74 – 10	Blackheath

Coundon Road

8 March 1997

London Scottish	18 – 37	Richmond

Athletic Ground

8 March 1997

Moseley	34 – 11	Rugby Lions

The Reddings

8 March 1997

Newcastle	57 – 10	Wakefield

Kingston Park

8 March 1997

Rotherham	30 – 24	Nottingham

Clifton Lane

=== Rounds 13 & 14 (rescheduled games) ===
15 March 1997

Rugby Lions	16 – 41	Rotherham

Webb Ellis Road

- Game rescheduled from 11 January 1997.

16 March 1997

Newcastle	53 – 17	Nottingham

Kingston Park

- Game rescheduled from 4 January 1997.

=== Round 18 ===
22 March 1997

Blackheath	24 – 0	Nottingham

Rectory Field

22 March 1997

London Scottish	13 – 14	Coventry

Athletic Ground

22 March 1997

Newcastle	88 – 19	Moseley

Kingston Park

22 March 1997

Rotherham	11 – 32	Bedford

Clifton Lane

22 March 1997

Rugby Lions	31 – 72	Richmond

Webb Ellis Road

22 March 1997

Waterloo	16 – 11	Wakefield

St Anthony's Road

=== Rounds 12 & 15 (rescheduled games) ===
29 March 1997

Newcastle	37 – 17	Richmond

Kingston Park

- Game rescheduled from 18 January 1997.

29 March 1997

Rugby Lions	16 – 45	London Scottish

Webb Ellis Road

- Game rescheduled from 28 December 1996.

29 March 1997

Wakefield	13 – 42	Moseley

College Grove

- Game rescheduled from 28 December 1996.

=== Round 13 (rescheduled game) ===
31 March 1997

London Scottish	34 – 3	Wakefield

Athletic Ground

- Game rescheduled from 4 January 1997.

=== Round 19 ===
5 April 1997

Bedford	34 – 28	Newcastle

Goldington Road
Attendance: 6,500 (Note: Attendance figures for Bedford v Newcastle on 5 April vary. The match report by the Independent gave a crowd figure of 6,500 while other sources had the figure as high as 7,500.)
Referee: S Lander

5 April 1997

Coventry	21 – 15	Rotherham

Coundon Road

5 April 1997

Moseley	44 – 16	London Scottish

The Reddings

5 April 1997

Nottingham	13 – 33	Waterloo

Ireland Avenue

5 April 1997

Richmond	29 – 24	Blackheath

Athletic Ground

5 April 1997

Wakefield	53 – 12	Rugby Lions

College Grove

=== Round 20 ===
12 April 1997

London Scottish	25 – 3	Rotherham

Athletic Ground

12 April 1997

Moseley	40 – 34	Bedford

The Reddings

12 April 1997

Newcastle	49 – 17	Coventry

Kingston Park

12 April 1997

Rugby Lions	24 – 32	Blackheath

Webb Ellis Road

12 April 1997

Wakefield	31 – 16	Nottingham

College Grove

12 April 1997

Waterloo	29 – 58	Richmond

St Anthony's Road

=== Round 15 (rescheduled game) ===
16 April 1997

Blackheath	10 – 72	Newcastle

Rectory Field

- Game rescheduled from 11 January 1997.

=== Round 21 ===
19 April 1997

Bedford	14 – 28	London Scottish

Goldington Road

19 April 1997

Blackheath	27 – 48	Waterloo

Rectory Field

19 April 1997

Coventry	33 – 18	Moseley

Coundon Road

19 April 1997

Nottingham	44 – 10	Rugby Lions

Ireland Avenue

19 April 1997

Richmond	55 – 22	Wakefield

Athletic Ground

19 April 1997

Rotherham	21 – 45	Newcastle

Clifton Lane

=== Round 22 ===
26 April 1997

Coventry	30 – 10	Bedford

Coundon Road

26 April 1997

Moseley	48 – 17	Rotherham

The Reddings

26 April 1997

Newcastle	71 – 20	London Scottish

Kingston Park

26 April 1997

Richmond	34 – 0	Nottingham

Athletic Ground

26 April 1997

Wakefield	14 – 11	Blackheath

College Grove

26 April 1997

Waterloo	45 – 12	Rugby Lions

St Anthony's Road

=== Round 12 (rescheduled game) ===
30 April 1997

Waterloo	24 – 66	Newcastle

St Anthony's Road

- Game rescheduled from 28 December 1996.

=== Rounds 10, 12 & 14 (rescheduled games) ===
3 May 1997

Wakefield	37 – 18	Coventry

College Grove

- Game rescheduled from 11 January 1997.

3 May 1997

Waterloo	23 – 17	London Scottish

St Anthony's Road

- Game rescheduled from 11 January 1997.

4 May 1997

Newcastle	61 – 13	Rotherham

Kingston Park

- Game rescheduled from 9 November 1996.

== Promotion play–offs ==
For the first time play–offs took place between the third and fourth placed teams in Division Two and the ninth and tenth placed teams in Division One. The play–offs followed a 4th v 9th, 3rd v 10th system - with the games being played over two legs and the second-tier team playing at home in the first leg.

=== First leg ===
7 May 1997

Bedford	11 – 20	Bristol

Goldington Road

7 May 1997

Coventry	16 – 14	London Irish

Coundon Road

=== Second leg ===
11 May 1997

Bristol	19 – 12	Bedford

Memorial Ground

- Bristol won 39 – 23 on aggregate to retain their place in Division One

11 May 1997

London Irish	28 – 7	Coventry

The Avenue

- London Irish won 42 – 23 on aggregate to retain their place in Division One

== Individual statistics ==
- Note that points scorers includes tries as well as conversions, penalties and drop goals.

=== Top points scorers ===
Rank	Player	Team	Appearances	Points
1	(Ireland) Simon Mason	Richmond	22	324
2	(England) Rob Andrew	Newcastle Falcons	22	297
3	(England) John Steele	London Scottish	18	256
4	(Wales) Mike Rayer	Bedford	21	238
5	(England) Jez Harris	Coventry	20	236
6	(England) Mike Jackson	Wakefield	19	199
7	(New Zealand) Richard Le Bas	Moseley	14	177
8	(England) Chris Braithwaite	Blackheath	14	137
9	(England) Tim Stimpson	Newcastle Falcons	21	116
10	(England) John Bentley	Newcastle Falcons	18	115

=== Top try scorers ===
Rank	Player	Team	Appearances	Tries
1	(England) John Bentley	Newcastle Falcons	18	23
2	(Scotland) Gary Armstrong	Newcastle Falcons	21	21
2	(Wales) Scott Quinnell	Richmond	21	21
3	(England) Jim Fallon	Richmond	21	19
4	(England) Andy Smallwood	Coventry	20	17
5	(Samoa) Pat Lam	Newcastle Falcons	11	15
5	(Ireland) Darragh O'Mahony	Moseley	13	15
6	(England) Andy McAdam	Coventry	18	14
6	(England) Tim Stimpson	Newcastle Falcons	18	14
7	(England) Ben Whetstone	Bedford	18	13
7	(Ireland) Guy Easterby	Rotherham	21	13

== Season records ==
=== Team ===
Largest home win — 151 pts

156 - 5 Newcastle Falcons at home to Rugby Lions on 5 October 1996

Largest away win — 72 pts

87 - 15 Richmond away to Moseley on 5 October 1996

Most points scored — 151 pts

156 - 5 Newcastle Falcons at home to Rugby Lions on 5 October 1996

Most tries in a match — 24

Newcastle Falcons at home to Rugby Lions on 5 October 1996

Most conversions in a match — 18

Newcastle Falcons at home to Rugby Lions on 5 October 1996

Most penalties in a match — 7

Rotherham away to Richmond on 14 September 1996

Most drop goals in a match — 2 (x3)

Coventry at home to Wakefield on 21 September 1996
London Scottish away to Blackheath on 8 February 1997
Blackheath at home to Nottingham on 22 March 1997

=== Player ===
Most points in a match — 42

(England) Jez Harris for Coventry at home to Nottingham on 5 October 1996

Most tries in a match — 5

(Samoa) Pat Lam for Newcastle Falcons at home to Rotherham on 4 May 1997

Most conversions in a match — 18

(England) Rob Andrew for Newcastle Falcons at home to Rugby Lions on 5 October 1996

Most penalties in a match — 7

(Australia) Matt Inman for Rotherham away to Richmond on 14 September 1996

Most drop goals in a match — 2 (x2)

(England) Jez Harris for Coventry at home to Wakefield on 21 September 1996
(England) Chris Braithwaite for Blackheath at home to Nottingham on 22 March 1997

=== Attendances ===
- Note that attendances were very poorly documented this season and aside from a few big games there is almost no information available

Highest — 8,000

Coventry at home to Newcastle Falcons on 2 November 1996

Lowest — N/A

N/A

Highest Average Attendance — N/A

N/A

Lowest Average Attendance — N/A

N/A

== See also ==
- 1996–97 National Division 1
- 1996–97 National Division 3
- 1996–97 National Division 4 North
- 1996–97 National Division 4 South
