= 1996–97 National Division 1 =

Rugby union competition in England

- Countries: England
- Date: 31 August 1996 – 7 May 1997
- Champions: Wasps (2nd title)
- Runners-up: Bath
- Relegated: West Hartlepool; Orrell
- Matches played: 132

Official website
- www.premiershiprugby.com

The 1995–96 National Division 1 (sponsored by Courage Brewery) was the tenth season of the top tier of the English rugby union league system, the Courage Clubs Championship, currently known as Premiership Rugby, and was the first season that saw professional rugby openly introduced into the English game. It was also the tenth and final season of sponsorship by Courage. Bath were the defending champions and London Irish and Northampton Saints the promoted teams.

Wasps finished as champions for the second time, six points clear of defending champions Bath. Bottom two clubs West Hartlepool and Orrell were relegated to the 1997–98 Premiership 2 (formerly National Division 2) while Bristol and London Irish would remain in the division having won their respective playoff games.

== Structure ==
Restructuring from the previous season increased the division from ten to twelve teams with each side playing one another twice, in a round robin system, home and away, to make a total of twenty-two matches for each team.

The reorganisation of the Courage Clubs Championship for the following season by the RFU meant there would be between two to four sides relegated into the new look Premiership 2. Sides finishing 11th and 12th would be automatically relegated while sides finishing 9th and 10th would be involved in a promotion/relegation playoff against the 3rd and 4th ranked sides from the 1996–97 National Division 2 with 9th v 4th and 10th v 3rd.

== Participating teams ==
Locations of the 1996–97 Courage League National Division One teams
1996-97 Greater London Courage League National Division One teams

Team	Stadium	Capacity	City/Area	Previous season
Bath	Recreation Ground	8,300 (1,000 seats)	Bath, Somerset	Champions
Bristol	Memorial Stadium	8,500 (1,200 seats)	Bristol	6th
Gloucester	Kingsholm	12,000	Gloucester, Gloucestershire	8th
Harlequins	The Stoop	9,000 (2,000 seats)	Twickenham, London	3rd
Leicester	Welford Road	17,000 (Note: Welford Road capacity up from 16,000 to 17,000 for the 1996–97 season.)	Leicester, Leicestershire	2nd
London Irish	The Avenue	3,600 (600 seats)	Sunbury-on-Thames, Surrey	Promoted from National 2 (2nd)
Northampton Saints	Franklin's Gardens	8,400 (Note: Franklin's Gardens capacity up from 6,000 to 8,400 for the 1996–97 with a capacity crowd achieved versus Leicester on 11th January 1997.)	Northampton, Northamptonshire	Promoted from National 2 (1st)
Orrell	Edge Hall Road	5,300 (300 seats)	Orrell, Greater Manchester	7th
Sale	Heywood Road	4,000 (500 seats)	Sale, Greater Manchester	5th
Saracens	Southbury Road (Note: For the 1996–97 season Saracens would groundshare with football team Enfield at Southbury Road having previously been based at Bramley Road.)	8,200 (Note: Southbury Road capacity originally listed as 5,000 but Saracens achieved a crowd of 8,200 versus Harlequins on 19 January 1997. The biggest crowd in the club's history up to this point.)	Enfield, London	9th
Wasps	Loftus Road (Note: For the 1996–97 season Wasps would groundshare with football team Queens Park Rangers at Loftus Road, having previously been based at Repton Avenue in Sudbury.)	18,439	Shepherd's Bush, London	4th
West Hartlepool	Brierton Lane	7,000	Hartlepool, County Durham	10th

== Table ==
Pos	Team	Pld	W	D	L	PF	PA	PD	Pts	Qualification
1	Wasps (C)	22	18	1	3	685	406	+279	37	Champions; 1997–98 Heineken Cup
2	Bath	22	15	1	6	863	411	+452	31	Qualified for 1997–98 Heineken Cup
3	Harlequins	22	15	0	7	745	416	+329	30	Qualified for 1997–98 Heineken Cup
4	Leicester	22	14	1	7	600	395	+205	29	Qualified for 1997–98 Heineken Cup
5	Sale	22	13	2	7	603	525	+78	28	
6	Saracens	22	12	1	9	568	449	+119	25	
7	Gloucester	22	11	1	10	476	589	−113	23	
8	Northampton Saints	22	10	0	12	515	477	+38	20	
9	Bristol	22	8	1	13	432	625	−193	17	Relegation playoff
10	London Irish	22	6	0	16	502	747	−245	12	Relegation playoff
11	West Hartlepool (R)	22	3	0	19	382	795	−413	6	Relegated to 1997–98 Allied Dunbar Premiership Two
12	Orrell (R)	22	3	0	19	350	886	−536	6	Relegated to 1997–98 Allied Dunbar Premiership Two

Rules for classification: Points are awarded as follows:
1. two points for a win
2. one point for a draw
3. no points for a loss

If teams are level at any stage, tiebreakers are applied in the following order:

1. difference between points for and against
2. total number of points for
  (C) Champions; (R) Relegated

== Results ==
The home team is listed in the left column.

Home \ Away	BAT	BRI	GLO	HAR	LEI	LOI	NOR	ORR	SAL	SAR	WAS	WHA
Bath		76–7	71–21	35–20	47–9	46–3	52–14	40–14	84–7	35–33	36–40	46–10
Bristol	13–18		18–13	24–35	12–38	26–38	20–11	38–10	34–24	11–21	18–41	20–17
Gloucester	29–45	20–20		11–27	32–30	29–19	19–6	30–0	12–16	9–6	28–23	37–10
Harlequins	22–6	29–6	75–19		18–34	66–7	36–16	89–18	30–31	27–0	22–42	48–10
Leicester	28–25	53–19	32–14	12–13		46–13	23–9	36–14	25–9	22–18	18–12	48–3
London Irish	31–56	27–28	20–21	20–19	25–18		34–21	27–48	19–25	23–37	20–22	52–41
Northampton Saints	9–6	29–21	25–27	15–20	22–19	31–21		41–7	30–12	17–10	15–26	46–20
Orrell	13–56	27–28	3–49	20–56	12–29	32–27	14–50		8–40	22–44	27–44	22–15
Sale Sharks	11–5	31–33	52–12	24–13	20–20	41–25	31–15	37–11		33–23	31–33	58–18
Saracens	36–29	33–15	41–11	28–20	25–23	45–0	24–23	24–15	17–17		15–28	51–8
Wasps	25–25	15–13	36–10	17–19	14–7	31–18	18–13	62–5	36–10	36–21		36–12
West Hartlepool	16–24	19–8	14–23	21–41	19–30	18–33	17–57	24–8	22–43	25–16	23–48	

Legend: Blue = home team win; Yellow = draw; Red = away team win.

== Fixtures & Results ==
=== Round 1 ===
31 August 1996

Harlequins	75 – 19	Gloucester
	Report

The Stoop
Referee: J Pearson

31 August 1996

London Irish	27 – 28	Bristol

The Avenue

31 August 1996

Northampton Saints	46 – 20	West Hartlepool

Franklin's Gardens

31 August 1996

Orrell	13 – 56	Bath
	Report

Edge Hall Road
Referee: S Piercy

31 August 1996

Sale	31 – 33	Wasps

Heywood Road

31 August 1996

Saracens	25 – 23	Leicester
	Report

Southbury Road
Referee: S Lander

=== Round 2 ===
7 September 1996

Bristol	38 – 10	Orrell

Memorial Stadium

7 September 1996

Gloucester	12 – 16	Sale

Kingsholm

7 September 1996

Leicester	28 – 26	Bath
	Report

Welford Road
Attendance: 14,000
Referee: Ed Morrison

7 September 1996

London Irish	34 – 21	Northampton Saints
	Report

The Avenue
Referee: S Lander

7 September 1996

West Hartlepool	21 – 41	Harlequins

Brierton Lane

8 September 1996

Wasps	36 – 21	Saracens

Loftus Road
Attendance: 8,000

=== Round 3 ===
14 September 1996

Bath	36 – 40	Wasps
	Report

Recreation Ground
Referee: J Pearson

14 September 1996

Harlequins	66 – 7	London Irish
	Report

The Stoop
Referee: Brian Campsall

14 September 1996

Northampton Saints	29 – 21	Bristol
	Report

Franklin's Gardens
Referee: J Wallis

14 September 1996

Orrell	12 – 29	Leicester
	Report

Edge Hall Road
Referee: C White

14 September 1996

Sale	58 – 18	West Hartlepool

Heywood Road

14 September 1996

Saracens	41 – 11	Gloucester

Southbury Road

=== Round 4 ===
21 September 1996

Bristol	24 – 35	Harlequins
	Report

Memorial Stadium
Referee: A Spreadbury

21 September 1996

Gloucester	29 – 45	Bath
	Report

Kingsholm
Referee: Brian Campsall

21 September 1996

London Irish	19 – 25	Sale

The Avenue

21 September 1996

Northampton Saints	41 – 7	Orrell

Franklin's Gardens

21 September 1996

West Hartlepool	25 – 16	Saracens

Brierton Lane

22 September 1996

Wasps	14 – 7	Leicester

Loftus Road

=== Round 5 ===
28 September 1996

Bath	46 – 10	West Hartlepool

Recreation Ground

28 September 1996

Leicester	32 – 14	Gloucester

Welford Road

28 September 1996

London Irish	23 – 37	Saracens

The Avenue

28 September 1996

Northampton Saints	15 – 20	Harlequins

Franklin's Gardens

28 September 1996

Orrell	27 – 44	Wasps
	Report

Edge Hall Road
Referee: T Spreadbury

28 September 1996

Sale	31 – 33	Bristol

Heywood Road

=== Round 6 ===
5 October 1996

Bristol	11 – 21	Saracens

Memorial Stadium

5 October 1996

Harlequins	89 – 18	Orrell
	Report

The Stoop
Attendance: 4,650
Referee: J Pearson

5 October 1996

London Irish	31 – 56	Bath
	Report

The Avenue
Referee: I Rammage

5 October 1996

Northampton Saints	30 – 12	Sale
	Report

Franklin's Gardens
Referee: Brian Campsall

5 October 1996

West Hartlepool	19 – 30	Leicester
	Report

Brierton Lane
Referee: Ed Morrison

6 October 1996

Gloucester	28 – 23	Wasps
	Report

Kingsholm
Referee: D Chapman

=== Round 7 ===
29 October 1996

Bath	76 – 7	Bristol
	Report

Recreation Ground
Referee: Brian Campsall

29 October 1996

Saracens	24 – 23	Northampton Saints
	Report

Southbury Road
Referee: G Warren

30 October 1996

Leicester	46 – 13	London Irish

Welford Road

30 October 1996

Sale	24 – 13	Harlequins

Heywood Road

31 October 1996

Wasps	P – P	West Hartlepool

Loftus Road

- Postponed. Game rescheduled to 23 February 1997.

31 October 1996

Orrell	P – P	Gloucester

Edge Hall Road

- Postponed. Game rescheduled to 16 November 1996.

=== Round 8 ===
9 November 1996

Bristol	P – P	Leicester

Memorial Stadium

- Postponed. Game rescheduled to 18 December 1996.

9 November 1996

Harlequins	P – P	Saracens

The Stoop

- Postponed. Game rescheduled to 9 April 1997.

9 November 1996

London Irish	P – P	Wasps

The Avenue

- Postponed. Game rescheduled to 16 November 1996.

9 November 1996

Northampton Saints	9 – 6	Bath
	Report

Franklin's Gardens
Referee: Ed Morrison

9 November 1996

Sale	37 – 11	Orrell

Heywood Road

9 November 1996

West Hartlepool	14 – 23	Gloucester
	Report

Brierton Lane
Attendance: 1,853
Referee: N Cousins

=== Rounds 7 & 8 (Rescheduled games) ===
16 November 1996

London Irish	20 – 22	Wasps
	Report

The Avenue
Referee: G Hughes

- Game rescheduled from 9 November 1996.

16 November 1996

Orrell	3 – 49	Gloucester

Edge Hall Road

- Game rescheduled from 31 October 1996.

=== Round 9 ===
7 December 1996

Bath	35 – 20	Harlequins
	Report

Recreation Ground
Referee: S Lander

7 December 1996

Gloucester	29 – 19	London Irish

Kingsholm

7 December 1996

Orrell	22 – 15	West Hartlepool

Edge Hall Road

7 December 1996

Wasps	15 – 13	Bristol Rugby
	Report

Loftus Road
Referee: A Watson

8 December 1996

Leicester	23 – 9	Northampton Saints
	Report

Welford Road
Attendance: 11,839
Referee: A Spreadbury

8 December 1996

Saracens	17 – 17	Sale

Southbury Road

=== Round 8 (Rescheduled game) ===
18 December 1996

Bristol	12 – 38	Leicester
	Report

Memorial Stadium
Referee: S Piercy

- Game rescheduled from 9 November 1996.

=== Round 10 ===
28 December 1996

Bristol	P – P	Gloucester

Memorial Stadium

- Postponed. Game rescheduled to 18 February 1997.

28 December 1996

Harlequins	18 – 34	Leicester
	Report

The Stoop
Referee: Brian Campsall

28 December 1996

London Irish	52 – 41	West Hartlepool

The Avenue

28 December 1996

Sale	P – P	Bath

Heywood Road

- Postponed. Game rescheduled to 2 April 1997.

28 December 1996

Saracens	P – P	Orrell

Southbury Road

- Postponed. Game rescheduled to 4 March 1997.

28 December 1996

Wasps	18 – 13	Northampton Saints
	Report

Loftus Road
Referee: A Rowden

=== Round 11 ===
4 January 1997

Bath	35 – 33	Saracens
	Report

Recreation Ground
Referee: Brian Campsall

4 January 1997

Gloucester	P – P	Northampton Saints

Kingsholm

- Postponed. Game rescheduled to 4 March 1997.

4 January 1997

Leicester	P – P	Sale

Welford Road

- Postponed. Game rescheduled to 4 March 1997.

4 January 1997

Orrell	P – P	London Irish

Edge Hall Road

- Postponed. Game rescheduled to 22 February 1997.

4 January 1997

West Hartlepool	19 – 8	Bristol
	Report

Brierton Lane
Referee: C Rees

5 January 1997

Wasps	17 – 19	Harlequins
	Report

Loftus Road
Referee: Ed Morrison

=== Round 12 ===
11 January 1997

Harlequins	22 – 6	Bath
	Report

The Stoop
Referee: S Piercey

11 January 1997

Bristol	18 – 41	Wasps
	Report

Memorial Stadium
Referee: T Spreadbury

11 January 1997

London Irish	20 – 21	Gloucester

The Avenue

11 January 1997

Northampton Saints	22 – 19	Leicester
	Report

Franklin's Gardens
Attendance: 8,400
Referee: C White

11 January 1997

West Hartlepool	24 – 8	Orrell

Brierton Lane

11 January 1997

Sale	P – P	Saracens

Heywood Road

- Postponed. Game rescheduled to 15 April 1997.

=== Round 13 ===
18 January 1997

Gloucester	37 – 10	West Hartlepool

Kingsholm

18 January 1997

Leicester	53 – 19	Bristol
	Report

Welford Road
Attendance: 9,122
Referee: J Pearson

18 January 1997

Orrell	8 – 40	Sale

Edge Hall Road

18 January 1997

Wasps	P – P	London Irish

Loftus Road

- Postponed. Game rescheduled to 26 March 1997.

19 January 1997

Bath	52 – 14	Northampton Saints
	Report

Recreation Ground
Referee: S Lander

19 January 1997

Saracens	28 – 20	Harlequins
	Report

Southbury Road
Attendance: 8,200 (Note: The crowd of 8,200 for Saracens v Harlequins on 19 January 1997 was noted as being the biggest crowd in Saracen's home club history up to this point.)
Referee: A Spreadbury

=== Round 14 ===
8 February 1997

Bristol	P – P	Bath

Memorial Stadium

- Postponed. Game rescheduled to 22 February 1997.

8 February 1997

Gloucester	30 – 0	Orrell

Kingsholm

8 February 1997

Harlequins	30 – 31	Sale
	Report

The Stoop
Referee: C White

8 February 1997

London Irish	P – P	Leicester

The Avenue

- Postponed. Game rescheduled to 16 April 1997.

8 February 1997

Northampton Saints	17 – 10	Saracens
	Report

Franklin's Gardens
Referee: G Hughes

8 February 1997

West Hartlepool	23 – 48	Wasps

Brierton Lane

=== Round 10 (rescheduled game) ===
18 February 1997

Bristol	18 – 13	Gloucester
	Report

Memorial Stadium
Referee: D Chapman

- Game rescheduled from 28 December 1996.

=== Rounds 7, 11 & 14 (rescheduled games) ===
22 February 1997

Bristol	13 – 18	Bath
	Report

Memorial Stadium
Attendance: 8,000
Referee: A Rowden

- Game rescheduled from 8 February 1997.

22 February 1997

Orrell	32 – 27	London Irish

Edge Hall Road

- Game rescheduled from 4 March 1997.

23 February 1997

Wasps	36 – 12	West Hartlepool

Loftus Road

- Game rescheduled from 31 October 1996.

=== Rounds 10 & 11 (rescheduled games) ===
4 March 1997

Gloucester	19 – 6	Northampton Saints

Kingsholm

- Game rescheduled from 4 January 1997.

4 March 1997

Leicester	25 – 9	Sale
	Report

Welford Road
Referee: A Rowden

- Game rescheduled from 4 January 1997.

4 March 1997

Saracens	24 – 15	Orrell

Southbury Road

- Game rescheduled from 28 December 1996.

=== Round 15 ===
8 March 1997

Bath	46 – 3	London Irish
	Report

Recreation Ground
Referee: G Hughes

8 March 1997

Leicester	48 – 3	West Hartlepool
	Report

Welford Road
Referee: D Chapman

8 March 1997

Orrell	20 – 56	Harlequins
	Report

Edge Hall Road
Referee: A Rowden

9 March 1997

Sale	31 – 15	Northampton Saints
	Report

Heywood Road
Referee: Ed Morrison

9 March 1997

Saracens	33 – 15	Bristol
	Report

Southbury Road
Referee: T Rossall

9 March 1997

Wasps	36 – 10	Gloucester

Loftus Road

=== Round 16 ===
22 March 1997

Bristol	34 – 24	Sale

Memorial Stadium

22 March 1997

Gloucester	P – P	Leicester

Kingsholm

- Postponed. Game rescheduled to 8 April 1997.

22 March 1997

Harlequins	48 – 10	West Hartlepool

The Stoop

- Harlequins were originally due to play Northampton at home and West Hartlepool were due to play Bath away but the fixtures were switched, leaving Bath and Northampton without games on the 22 March. Harlequins would play Northampton on 30 April 1997 while Bath would play West Hartlepool on 27 March 1997.

22 March 1997

Saracens	P – P	London Irish

Southbury Road

- Postponed. Game rescheduled to 30 April 1997.

22 March 1997

Wasps	62 – 5	Orrell

Loftus Road

- Byes: Bath, Northampton Saints

=== Rounds 13 & 16 (rescheduled games) ===
26 March 1997

Wasps	31 – 18	London Irish
	Report

Loftus Road

- Game rescheduled from 18 January 1997.

27 March 1997

West Hartlepool	16 – 24	Bath
	Report

Brierton Lane
Referee: Brian Campsall

- Game rescheduled from 22 March 1997 when West Hartlepool's game with Bath was swapped for an away game against Harlequins.

=== Round 17 ===
29 March 1997

Bath	P – P	Gloucester

Recreation Ground

- Postponed. Game rescheduled to 30 April 1997.

29 March 1997

Harlequins	P – P	Bristol

The Stoop

- Postponed. Game rescheduled to 15 April 1997.

29 March 1997

Leicester	P – P	Wasps

Welford Road

- Postponed. Game rescheduled to 2 April 1997.

29 March 1997

Orrell	14 – 50	Northampton Saints

Edge Hall Road

29 March 1997

Sale	P – P	London Irish

Heywood Road

- Postponed. Game rescheduled to 23 April 1997.

30 March 1997

Saracens	51 – 8	West Hartlepool

Southbury Road

=== Rounds 10 & 17 (rescheduled games) ===
2 April 1997

Leicester	18 – 12	Wasps
	Report

Welford Road
Attendance: 17,000
Referee: Brian Campsall

- Game rescheduled from 29 March 1997.

2 April 1997

Sale	11 – 5	Bath
	Report

Heywood Road
Referee: J Pearson

- Game rescheduled from 28 December 1996.

=== Round 18 ===
5 April 1997

Bristol	20 – 11	Northampton Saints

Memorial Stadium

5 April 1997

Gloucester	9 – 6	Saracens
	Report

Kingsholm
Referee: A Rowden

5 April 1997

Leicester	36 – 14	Orrell
	Report

Welford Road
Referee: S Piercy

5 April 1997

London Irish	20 – 19	Harlequins

The Avenue

5 April 1997

West Hartlepool	22 – 43	Sale

Brierton Lane

6 April 1997

Wasps	25 – 25	Bath
	Report

Loftus Road
Attendance: 11,000
Referee: C White

=== Rounds 8 & 16 (rescheduled games) ===
8 April 1997

Gloucester	32 – 30	Leicester
	Report

Kingsholm
Referee: G Hughes

- Game rescheduled from 22 March 1997.

9 April 1997

Harlequins	27 – 0	Saracens
	Report

The Stoop
Referee: S Piercey

- Game rescheduled from 9 November 1996.

=== Round 19 ===
12 April 1997

Bath	47 – 9	Leicester
	Report

Recreation Ground
Referee: Ed Morrison

12 April 1997

Northampton Saints	31 – 21	London Irish

Franklin's Gardens

12 April 1997

Orrell	27 – 28	Bristol

Edge Hall Road

12 April 1997

Sale	52 – 12	Gloucester
	Report

Heywood Road
Referee: Brian Campsall

12 April 1997

Saracens	15 – 28	Wasps
	Report

Southbury Road
Referee: S Lander

- Byes: Harlequins, West Hartlepool (Note: The Harlequins versus West Hartlepool fixture was rescheduled to be played on 22 March 1997 due to the original game of West Hartlepool versus Bath being switched to 29 March.)

=== Rounds 12, 14 & 17 (rescheduled games) ===
15 April 1997

Harlequins	29 – 6	Bristol

The Stoop

- Game rescheduled from 29 March 1997.

15 April 1997

Sale	33 – 23	Saracens

Heywood Road

- Game rescheduled from 11 January 1997.

16 April 1997

London Irish	25 – 18	Leicester

The Avenue

- Game rescheduled from 22 February 1997.

=== Round 20 ===
19 April 1997

Bath	40 – 14	Orrell
	Report

Recreation Ground
Referee: A Rowden

- Orrell were relegated.

19 April 1997

Bristol	26 – 38	London Irish

Memorial Stadium

19 April 1997

Gloucester	11 – 27	Harlequins
	Report

Kingsholm
Referee: J Pearson

19 April 1997

Leicester	22 – 18	Saracens
	Report

Welford Road
Referee: C White

19 April 1997

West Hartlepool	17 – 57	Northampton Saints

Brierton Lane

20 April 1997

Wasps	36 – 10	Sale
	Report

Loftus Road
Referee: Ed Morrison

=== Round 17 (rescheduled game) ===
23 April 1997

Sale	41 – 25	London Irish

Heywood Road

- Game rescheduled from 29 March 1997.

=== Round 21 ===
26 April 1997

Bath	84 – 7	Sale
	Report

Recreation Ground
Referee: C White

26 April 1997

Gloucester	20 – 20	Bristol

Kingsholm

26 April 1997

Leicester	12 – 13	Harlequins
	Report

Welford Road
Referee: S Lander

26 April 1997

Northampton Saints	15 – 26	Wasps
	Report

Franklin's Gardens
Referee: G Hughes

- Wasps are champions.

26 April 1997

Orrell	22 – 44	Saracens

Edge Hall Road

26 April 1997

West Hartlepool	18 - 33	London Irish

Brierton Lane

- West Hartlepool are relegated.

=== Rounds 16 & 17 (rescheduled games) ===
30 April 1997

Bath	71 – 21	Gloucester

Recreation Ground

- Game rescheduled from 29 March 1997.

30 April 1997

Harlequins	36 – 16	Northampton Saints

The Stoop

- Game rescheduled from 22 March 1997 when Harlequins game with Northampton was swapped to Harlequins versus West Hartlepool.

30 April 1997

Saracens	45 – 0	London Irish

Southbury Road

- Game rescheduled from 22 March 1997.

=== Round 22 ===
3 May 1997

Harlequins	22 – 42	Wasps
	Report

The Stoop
Referee: C White

3 May 1997

London Irish	27 – 48	Orrell

The Avenue

3 May 1997

Northampton Saints	25 – 27	Gloucester
	Report

Franklin's Gardens
Referee: C Reeks

3 May 1997

Sale	20 – 20	Leicester
	Report

Heywood Road
Referee: Ed Morrison

3 May 1997

Saracens	36 – 29	Bath

Southbury Road

4 May 1997

Bristol	20 – 17	West Hartlepool

Memorial Stadium

== Relegation/Promotion playoffs ==
For the first time play-offs took place between the third and fourth placed teams in Division Two and the ninth and tenth placed teams in Division One. The play-offs followed a 4th v 9th, 3rd v 10th system. The matches were played over two legs, with the second-tier team playing at home in the first leg.

=== First leg ===
7 May 1997

Bedford	11 – 20	Bristol
	Report

Goldington Road
Referee: J Pearson

7 May 1997

Coventry	16 – 14	London Irish
	Report

Coundon Road
Referee: G Hughes

=== Second leg ===
11 May 1997

Bristol	19 – 12	Bedford
	Report

Memorial Ground
Referee: S Lander

Bristol won 39–23 on aggregate.

11 May 1997

London Irish	28 – 7	Coventry
	Report

The Avenue
Referee: Ed Morrison

London Irish won 42–23 on aggregate.

== See also ==
- 1996–97 National Division 2
- 1996–97 National Division 3
- 1996–97 National Division 4 North
- 1996–97 National Division 4 South
