= 1996–97 National Division 4 South =

Rugby union competition in England

- Countries: England
- Champions: Newbury (1st title)
- Runners-up: Henley (not promoted)
- Relegated: Askeans, Charlton Park, High Wycombe, Berry Hill
- Matches played: 182

The 1996–97 National Division 4 South was the tenth full season of rugby union within the fourth tier of the English league system, currently known as National League 2 South, and the last using the name National Division 4 South. Changes to the league structure by the RFU at the start of the season saw National Division 4 revert to two regional divisions (National Division 4 North and National Division 4 South), while (National Division 5) was split back into regional leagues - North 1, Midlands 1, London 1 and South West 1. (Note: These regional divisions had previously been tier 6 leagues during the days of National Division 5 but would revert to being level 5 leagues for the 1996-97 season.) This meant that National Division 4 South increased from 10 to 14 teams (28 overall) with multiple teams coming up from the discontinued Division 5.

At the end of the season, Newbury were deserving champions, winning 25 league games that they played (one match was cancelled) and claiming the only promotion spot to the 1997–98 National Division 1 (formerly National Division 3), 10 points clear of their nearest challengers, Henley. At the other end of the table, four teams were relegated. Askeans and Charlton Park were comfortably the worst teams in the division and were the first two sides to go down, followed by High Wycombe and then Berry Hill, with Berry Hill putting up the most fight and finishing just one point from safety. Askeans and Charlton Park would drop to London Division 1 while High Wycombe and Berry Hill would fall to South West 1. The reason Division 4 South had so many relegation places compared to Division 4 North (4 to 2) was that 3 out of 4 of the teams relegated from the division above were based in the south of the country, requiring more places to accommodate for their arrival the following season.

== Structure ==
Each team played home and away matches against each of the other teams, playing a total of twenty-six matches each. The league champions were promoted to the new-look National League 1 while the bottom four sides dropped to either London 1 or South West 1 depending on locality.

== Participating teams and locations ==
1996–97 National Division 4 South teams in England

Team	Ground	Capacity	City/Area	Previous season
Askeans	Broad Walk	1,500 (300 seats)	Kidbrooke, London	Promoted from Division 5 South (8th)
Barking	Goresbrook	1,000	Becontree, Dagenham, London	Promoted from Division 5 South (4th)
Berry Hill	Lakers Road		Coleford, Gloucestershire	Promoted from Division 5 South (5th)
Camberley	Watchetts		Camberley, Surrey	Promoted from Division 5 South (7th)
Charlton Park	Broad Walk	1,500 (300 seats)	Kidbrooke, Greenwich, London	Promoted from London 1 (champions)
Cheltenham	Newlands Park		Southam, Cheltenham, Gloucestershire	Promoted from Division 5 South (6th)
Henley	Dry Leas	4,000	Henley-on-Thames, Oxfordshire	Promoted from Division 5 South (3rd)
High Wycombe	Kingsmead Road		High Wycombe, Buckinghamshire	Promoted from Division 5 South (10th)
Metropolitan Police	Imber Court	3,500 (500 seats)	East Molesey, Surrey	Promoted from Division 5 South (12th)
Newbury	Monk's Lane	8,000	Newbury, Berkshire	Promoted from South West 1 (champions)
North Walsham	Norwich Road	1,200	Scottow, Norfolk	Promoted from Division 5 South (11th)
Plymouth Albion	Beacon Park	1,950 (450 seats)	Plymouth, Devon	10th
Tabard	Cobden Hill		Radlett, Hertfordshire	Promoted from Division 5 South (9th)
Weston-super-Mare	Recreation Ground	3,000	Weston-super-Mare, Somerset	Promoted from Division 5 South (runners up)

== League table ==
1996–97 National Division 4 South table
Pos	Team	Pld	W	D	L	PF	PA	PD	Pts	Qualification
1	Newbury (C)	25	25	0	0	1170	295	+875	50	Promoted
2	Henley Hawks	26	19	2	5	754	477	+277	40	
3	Barking	26	16	1	9	740	496	+244	33	
4	Camberley	26	15	2	9	688	513	+175	32	
5	Cheltenham	26	15	2	9	559	420	+139	32	
6	Plymouth Albion	26	13	3	10	709	591	+118	29	
7	Metropolitan Police	26	14	1	11	659	558	+101	29	
8	Weston-super-Mare	26	12	0	14	503	501	+2	24	
9	Tabard	26	10	3	13	511	557	−46	23	
10	North Walsham	26	10	1	15	426	604	−178	21	
11	Berry Hill (R)	26	10	0	16	425	643	−218	20	Relegated
12	High Wycombe (R)	26	8	1	17	560	707	−147	17	Relegated
13	Charlton Park (R)	26	3	1	22	351	1140	−789	7	Relegated
14	Askeans (R)	25	2	1	22	340	893	−553	5	Relegated

Rules for classification: Points are awarded as follows: 2 pts for a win, 1 pt for a draw, 0 pts for a loss. If teams are level at any stage, difference between points for and against applies.
(C) Champions; (R) Relegated

== Sponsorship ==
National Division 4 South is part of the Courage Clubs Championship and is sponsored by Courage Brewery. This was their tenth and final season of sponsorship.

== See also ==
- 1996–97 National Division 1
- 1996–97 National Division 2
- 1996–97 National Division 3
- 1996–97 National Division 4 North
