= 1995–96 National Division 4 =

Rugby union competition in England

- Countries: England
- Champions: Exeter (1st title)
- Runners-up: London Welsh (also promoted) (Note: The re-organization of the English league system by the RFU meant that the top 8 teams would be promoted to Courage League National 3 for the 1996-97 season.)
- Relegated: No relegation (Note: This re-organization also meant that there was no relegation with the bottom 2 teams instead being transferred to the new-look Courage League Division 4 South or Courage League Division 4 North for the 1996-97 season.)
- Matches played: 162

The 1995–96 National Division 4 was the ninth full season of rugby union within the fourth tier of the English league system, currently the regional divisions National League 2 South and National League 2 North, and the third and final using the name National Division 4. Impending changes to the league structure by the RFU meant that this would be the last season for National Division 4 as a national league with it reverting to the previous incarnation of two regional leagues - National Division 4 North and National Division 4 North. It would also herald the elimination of National Division 5 North and South, which were to be divided back into four regional divisions - North 1, Midlands 1, London 1 and South West 1. These changes meant that the top 8 teams would be promoted to an expanded National Division 3 while the bottom teams would be transferred into the reintroduced National Division 4 North or South depending on location, where they would be joined by teams from the discontinued National Division 5 North/South divisions.

By the end of the campaign Exeter finished as champions, 4 points ahead of runners up London Welsh. Both champions and runners up were joined by the teams ranked 3rd through to 8th in claiming promotion to the 1996–97 National Division 3. The bottom two sides were Plymouth Albion and Aspatria who would be transferred to National Division 4 South and National Division 4 North respectively.

== Structure ==
Each team played home and away matches against each of the other teams, playing a total of eighteen matches each. Changes to the league structure by the RFU for the 1996-97 season meant that the top eight sides were promoted to National Division 3 while the bottom two were transferred to the new-look National Division 4 North or National Division 4 South depending on locality.

== Participating teams and locations ==
1995–96 National Division 4 teams in England

Team	Stadium	Capacity	City/Area	Previous season
Aspatria	Bower Park	3,000 (300 seats)	Aspatria, Cumbria	5th
Clifton	Station Road	2,200 (200 seats)	Cribbs Causeway, Henbury, Bristol	Relegated from National 3 (9th)
Exeter	County Ground	5,750 (750 seats)	Exeter, Devon	Relegated from National 3 (10th)
Havant	Hook's Lane	2,000 (200 seats)	Havant, Hampshire	4th
Leeds	Clarence Fields	7,850 (850 seats)	Leeds, West Yorkshire	6th
Liverpool St Helens	Moss Lane	4,370 (370 seats)	St Helens, Merseyside	3rd
London Welsh	Old Deer Park	5,850	Richmond, London	Promoted from National 5 South (1st)
Plymouth Albion	Beacon Park	1,950 (450 seats)	Plymouth, Devon	8th
Redruth	Recreation Ground	12,000	Redruth, Cornwall	7th
Walsall	Broadway Ground	2,250 (250 seats) (Note: Broadway Ground capacity reduced from 1989 estimate of 2,500 (250 seats).)	Walsall, West Midlands	Promoted from National 5 North (1st)

== League table ==
1995–96 National Division 4 table
Pos	Team	Pld	W	D	L	PF	PA	PD	Pts	Qualification
1	Exeter (C, P)	18	14	0	4	448	230	+218	28	Promoted
2	London Welsh (P)	18	12	0	6	424	269	+155	24	Promoted
3	Liverpool St Helens (P)	18	11	1	6	471	343	+128	23	Promoted
4	Walsall (P)	18	10	0	8	406	324	+82	20	Promoted
5	Leeds (P)	18	9	1	8	311	345	−34	19	Promoted
6	Clifton (P)	18	7	2	9	283	298	−15	16	Promoted
7	Redruth (P)	18	7	2	9	358	391	−33	16	Promoted
8	Havant (P)	18	7	1	10	287	368	−81	15	Promoted
9	Aspatria	18	5	1	12	356	497	−141	11	
10	Plymouth Albion	18	4	0	14	266	545	−279	8	

Rules for classification: Points are awarded as follows: 2 pts for a win, 1 pt for a draw, 0 pts for a loss. If teams are level at any stage, difference between points for and against applies.
(C) Champions; (P) Promoted

== Sponsorship ==
National Division 4 is part of the Courage Clubs Championship and is sponsored by Courage Brewery.

== See also ==
- 1995–96 National Division 1
- 1995–96 National Division 2
- 1995–96 National Division 3
- 1995–96 Courage League Division 5 North
- 1995–96 Courage League Division 5 South
