= 1995–96 National Division 2 =

Rugby union competition in England

- Countries: England
- Date: 9 September 1995 – 27 April 1996
- Champions: Northampton (2nd title)
- Runners-up: London Irish
- Relegated: None
- Matches played: 90
- Top point scorer: 301 – Michael Corcoran (London Irish)
- Top try scorer: 20 – Matt Allen (Northampton)

The 1995–96 National Division 2 (sponsored by Courage Brewery) was the ninth season of the second tier of the English rugby union league system, the Courage Clubs Championship, currently known as Champ Rugby. New teams to the division included Northampton (relegated from tier 1) and Bedford and Blackheath (both promoted from tier 3).

Northampton were easily the best side in the division, finishing as champions 6 points clear of runners up London Irish, with both sides promoted to the 1996–97 National Division 1. It was the second time Northampton had won the Division 2 title and it was also the second time a team had won all of their matches in a season, with 18 wins out of 18 and a huge points for difference of +664. Bedford finished last but were not relegated to the 1996–97 National Division 3 due to the expansion of Division 2 in 1996–97 to twelve teams.

== Structure ==
Each side played one another twice, in a round robin system, home and away, to make a total of eighteen matches for each team. The top two sides would be promoted to National Division 1 and there would be no relegation due to the expansion of National Division 2 from ten to twelve teams for the following season.

== Participating teams ==
Locations of the 1995–96 National Division 2 teams

Team	Stadium	Capacity	City/Area	Previous season
Bedford	Goldington Road	4,800 (800 seats)	Bedford, Bedfordshire	Promoted from National 3 (1st)
Blackheath	Rectory Field	3,500 (500 seats)	Greenwich, London	Promoted from National 3 (2nd)
London Irish	The Avenue	3,600 (600 seats)	Sunbury-on-Thames, Surrey	5th
London Scottish	Athletic Ground	7,300 (1,300 seats)	Richmond, London	4th
Moseley	The Reddings	9,999 (1,800 seats)	Birmingham, West Midlands	6th
Newcastle Gosforth	Kingston Park	6,600	Newcastle upon Tyne, Tyne and Wear	3rd
Northampton	Franklin's Gardens	6,000 (2,000 seats)	Northampton, Northamptonshire	Relegated from National 1 (10th)
Nottingham	Ireland Avenue	4,990 (590 seats)	Beeston, Nottinghamshire	7th
Wakefield	College Grove	4,000 (500 seats)	Wakefield, West Yorkshire	2nd
Waterloo	St Anthony's Road	9,950 (950 seats)	Blundellsands, Merseyside	8th

== Table ==
1995–96 National Division 2 table
Pos	Team	Pld	W	D	L	PF	PA	PD	Pts	Qualification
1	Northampton	18	18	0	0	867	203	+664	36	Promoted
2	London Irish	18	15	0	3	584	405	+179	30	Promoted
3	London Scottish	18	10	2	6	361	389	−28	22	
4	Wakefield	18	8	0	10	328	331	−3	16	
5	Waterloo	18	7	2	9	309	483	−174	16	
6	Moseley	18	7	0	11	327	447	−120	14	
7	Blackheath	18	6	1	11	341	469	−128	13	
8	Newcastle Gosforth	18	5	1	12	348	405	−57	11	
9	Nottingham	18	5	1	12	333	433	−100	11	
10	Bedford Blues	18	5	1	12	287	520	−233	11	

Rules for classification: Points are awarded as follows:
1. two points for a win
2. one point for a draw
3. no points for a loss

If teams are level at any stage, tiebreakers are applied in the following order:

1. difference between points for and against
2. total number of points for
There was no relegation this season.

== Fixtures & Results ==
=== Round 1 ===
9 September 1995

London Irish	32 – 65	Northampton

The Avenue

9 September 1995

Moseley	9 – 0	Newcastle Gosforth

The Reddings

9 September 1995

Nottingham	31 – 17	Blackheath

Ireland Avenue

9 September 1995

Wakefield	32 – 23	Bedford

College Grove

9 September 1995

Waterloo	3 – 11	London Scottish

St Anthony's Road

=== Round 2 ===
16 September 1995

Bedford	10 – 10	Waterloo

Goldington Road

16 September 1995

Blackheath	20 – 16	Wakefield

Rectory Field

16 September 1995

London Scottish	19 – 15	London Irish

Athletic Ground

16 September 1995

Newcastle Gosforth	31 – 24	Nottingham

Kingston Park

16 September 1995

Northampton	50 – 7	Moseley

Franklin's Gardens

=== Round 3 ===
23 September 1995

Bedford	21 – 18	Blackheath

Goldington Road

23 September 1995

Moseley	19 – 21	London Scottish

The Reddings

23 September 1995

Nottingham	7 – 43	Northampton

Ireland Avenue

23 September 1995

Wakefield	26 – 7	Newcastle Gosforth

College Grove

23 September 1995

Waterloo	16 – 50	London Irish

St Anthony's Road

=== Round 4 ===
30 September 1995

Blackheath	21 – 9	Waterloo

Rectory Field

30 September 1995

London Irish	49 – 8	Moseley

The Avenue

30 September 1995

London Scottish	17 – 9	Nottingham

Athletic Ground

30 September 1995

Newcastle Gosforth	23 – 30	Bedford

Kingston Park

30 September 1995

Northampton	23 – 0	Wakefield

Franklin's Gardens

=== Round 5 ===
7 October 1995

Bedford	17 – 49	Northampton Saints

Goldington Road

7 October 1995

Blackheath	39 – 19	Newcastle Gosforth

The Rectory

7 October 1995

Nottingham	9 – 22	London Irish

Ireland Avenue

7 October 1995

Wakefield	16 – 20	London Scottish

College Grove

7 October 1995

Waterloo	22 – 17	Moseley

St Anthony's Road

=== Round 6 ===
14 October 1995

London Irish	31 – 7	Wakefield

The Avenue

14 October 1995

London Scottish	50 – 10	Bedford

Athletic Ground

14 October 1995

Moseley	18 – 6	Nottingham

The Reddings

14 October 1995

Newcastle Gosforth	26 – 29	Waterloo

Kingston Park

14 October 1995

Northampton	69 – 14	Blackheath

Franklin's Gardens

=== Round 7 ===
21 October 1995

Bedford	29 – 46	London Irish

Goldington Road

21 October 1995

Blackheath	16 – 16	London Scottish

Rectory Field

21 October 1995

Newcastle Gosforth	9 – 52	Northampton

Kingston Park

21 October 1995

Nottingham	12 – 19	Waterloo

Ireland Avenue

21 October 1995

Wakefield	9 – 11	Moseley

College Grove

=== Round 8 ===
28 October 1995

London Irish	32 – 9	Blackheath

The Avenue

28 October 1995

London Scottish	28 – 8	Newcastle Gosforth

Athletic Ground

28 October 1995

Moseley	27 – 18	Bedford

The Reddings

28 October 1995

Nottingham	22 – 18	Wakefield

Ireland Avenue

28 October 1995

Waterloo	3 – 69	Northampton

St Anthony's Road

=== Round 9 ===
4 November 1995

Bedford	20 – 12	Nottingham

Goldington Road

4 November 1995

Blackheath	9 – 27	Moseley

Rectory Field

4 November 1995

Newcastle Gosforth	19 – 23	London Irish

Kingston Park

4 November 1995

Northampton	54 – 11	London Scottish

Franklin's Gardens

4 November 1995

Wakefield	14 – 6	Waterloo

College Grove

=== Round 10 ===
11 November 1995

Bedford	20 – 13	Wakefield

Goldington Road

11 November 1995

Blackheath	25 – 16	Nottingham

Rectory Field

11 November 1995

London Scottish	16 – 16	Waterloo

Athletic Ground

11 November 1995

Newcastle Gosforth	8 – 9	Moseley

Kingston Park

11 November 1995

Northampton	52 – 24	London Irish

Franklin's Gardens

=== Round 11 ===
6 January 1996

Blackheath	23 – 8	Bedford

Rectory Field

6 January 1996

London Irish	39 – 16	Waterloo

The Avenue

6 January 1996

London Scottish	17 – 8	Moseley

Athletic Ground

6 January 1996

Newcastle Gosforth	11 – 17	Wakefield

Kingston Park

6 January 1996

Northampton	35 – 5	Nottingham

Franklin's Gardens

=== Round 12 ===
13 January 1996

London Irish	21 – 20	London Scottish

The Avenue

13 January 1996

Moseley	P – P	Northampton

The Reddings

- Postponed. Game rescheduled to 24 February 1996.

13 January 1996

Nottingham	24 – 24	Newcastle Gosforth

Ireland AVenue

13 January 1996

Wakefield	17 – 0	Blackheath

College Grove

13 January 1996

Waterloo	48 – 24	Bedford

St Anthony's Road

=== Round 13 ===
10 February 1996

Bedford	P – P	Newcastle Gosforth

Goldington Road

- Postponed. Game rescheduled to 9 March 1996.

10 February 1996

Moseley	P – P	London Irish

The Reddings

- Postponed. Game rescheduled to 9 March 1996.

10 February 1996

Nottingham	P – P	London Scottish

Ireland Avenue

- Postponed. Game rescheduled to 9 March 1996.

10 February 1996

Wakefield	P – P	Northampton

College Grove

- Postponed. Game rescheduled to 20 April 1996.

10 February 1996

Waterloo	32 – 10	Blackheath

St Anthony's Road

=== Round 14 ===
17 February 1996

London Irish	39 – 27	Nottingham

The Avenue

17 February 1996

London Scottish	22 – 31	Wakefield

Athletic Ground

17 February 1996

Moseley	24 – 30	Waterloo

The Reddings

17 February 1996

Newcastle Gosforth	25 – 10	Blackheath

Kingston Park

17 February 1996

Northampton	P – P	Bedford

Franklin's Gardens

- Postponed. Game rescheduled to 23 March 1996.

=== Round 12 (rescheduled game) ===
24 February 1996

Moseley	16 – 46	Northampton

The Reddings

- Game rescheduled from 13 January 1996.

=== Round 13 (rescheduled games) ===
9 March 1996

Bedford	6 – 24	Newcastle Gosforth

Goldington Road

- Game rescheduled from 10 February 1996.

9 March 1996

Moseley	26 – 29	London Irish

The Reddings

- Game rescheduled from 10 February 1996.

9 March 1996

Nottingham	12 – 19	London Scottish

Ireland Avenue

- Game rescheduled from 10 February 1996.

=== Round 14 (rescheduled game) ===
23 March 1996

Northampton	48 – 0	Bedford

Franklin's Gardens

- Game rescheduled from 17 February 1996.

=== Round 15 ===
30 March 1996

Bedford	21 – 19	London Scottish

Goldington Road

30 March 1996

Blackheath	10 – 24	Northampton

The Rectory

30 March 1996

Nottingham	48 – 27	Moseley

Ireland Avenue

30 March 1996

Wakefield	19 – 31	London Irish

College Grove

30 March 1996

Waterloo	13 – 36	Newcastle Gosforth

St Anthony's Road

=== Round 16 ===
6 April 1996

London Irish	25 – 13	Bedford

The Avenue

6 April 1996

London Scottish	27 – 26	Blackheath

Athletic Ground

6 April 1996

Moseley	15 – 26	Wakefield

The Reddings

6 April 1996

Northampton	26 – 5	Newcastle Gosforth

Franklin's Gardens

6 April 1996

Waterloo	13 – 24	Nottingham

St Anthony's Road

=== Round 17 ===
13 April 1996

Bedford	8 – 23	Moseley

Goldington Road

13 April 1996

Blackheath	23 – 46	London Irish

Rectory Field

- London Irish are promoted as league runners up.

13 April 1996

Newcastle Gosforth	45 – 11	London Scottish

Kingston Park

13 April 1996

Northampton	69 – 5	Waterloo

Franklin's Gardens

- Northampton are promoted as champions.

13 April 1996

Wakefield	15 – 36	Nottingham

College Grove

=== Round 13 (rescheduled game) ===
20 April 1996

Wakefield	21 – 34	Northampton

College Grove

- Game rescheduled from 10 February 1996.

=== Round 18 ===
27 April 1996

London Irish	29 – 28	Newcastle Gosforth

The Avenue

27 April 1996

London Scottish	17 – 59	Northampton

Athletic Ground

27 April 1996

Moseley	36 – 51	Blackheath

The Reddings

27 April 1996

Nottingham	30 – 11	Bedford

Ireland Avenue

27 April 1996

Waterloo	20 – 10	Wakefield

St Anthony's Road

== See also ==
- 1995–96 National Division 1
- 1995–96 National Division 3
- 1995–96 National Division 4
- 1995–96 Courage League Division 5 North
- 1995–96 Courage League Division 5 South
