= 1996–97 National Division 4 North =

Season of rugby

- Countries: England
- Champions: Worcester (1st title)
- Runners-up: Birmingham & Solihull (not promoted)
- Relegated: Stoke-on-Trent, Hereford
- Matches played: 182

The 1996–97 National Division 4 North was the tenth full season of rugby union within the fourth tier of the English league system, currently known as National League 2 North, and the last using the name National Division 4 North. Changes to the league structure by the RFU at the start of the season saw National Division 4 revert to two regional divisions (National Division 4 North and National Division 4 South), while Courage League Division 5 North and South were split back into regional leagues - North 1, Midlands 1, London 1 and South West 1. This meant that National Division 4 North increased from 10 to 14 teams (28 overall) with multiple teams coming up from the discontinued Division 5.

Worcester were deserving champions, going undefeated in the league to take the title and only promotion spot to the 1997–98 National Division 1 (formerly National Division 3), 11 points clear of runners up Birmingham & Solihull. While Worcester were deserving champions, Stoke-on-Trent and Hereford were easily the worst teams in the division and as a consequence were the two sides to go down, well short of safety. Both sides would drop to Midlands 1. The reason Division 4 North had less relegation places compared to Division 4 North (2 to 4) was that 3 out of 4 of the teams relegated from the division above were based in the south of the country, requiring more places to accommodate for their arrival the following season.

== Structure ==
Each team played home and away matches against each of the other teams, playing a total of twenty-six matches each. The league champions were promoted to the new-look National League 1 while the bottom four sides dropped to either North 1 or Midlands 1 depending on locality.

== Participating teams and locations ==
Locations of the 1996–97 National Division 4 North teams

Team	Ground	Capacity	City/Area	Previous season
Aspatria	Bower Park	3,000 (300 seats)	Aspatria, Cumbria	9th
Birmingham & Solihull	Sharmans Cross	4,000	Solihull, West Midlands	Promoted from National 5 North (3rd)
Hereford	Wyeside	3,200 (200 seats)	Hereford, Herefordshire	Promoted from Midlands 1 (1st)
Kendal	Mint Bridge	4,600 (600 seats)	Kendal, Cumbria	Promoted from National 5 North (9th)
Lichfield	Cooke Fields	5,460 (460 seats)	Lichfield, Staffordshire	Promoted from National 5 North (12th)
Manchester	Grove Park	4,000	Cheadle Hulme, Greater Manchester	Promoted from North 1 (1st)
Nuneaton	Liberty Way (Note: Nuneaton were previously based at the Harry Cleaver Ground before moving to Liberty Way in November 1995.)	3,800 (500 seats)	Nuneaton, Warwickshire	Promoted from National 5 North (10th)
Preston Grasshoppers	Lightfoot Green	2,250 (250 seats)	Preston, Lancashire	Promoted from National 5 North (8th)
Sandal	Milnthorpe Green		Sandal Magna, Wakefield, West Yorkshire	Promoted from National 5 North (6th)
Sheffield	Abbeydale Park	3,300 (100 seats) (Note: Although a 1990 club estimate was 1,100 (100 seated and 1,000 standing) this is very conservative as Abbeydale Park would experience 3,000+ crowds several times in later history in what was a relatively unchanged ground.)	Dore, Sheffield, South Yorkshire	Promoted from National 5 North (5th)
Stoke-on-Trent	Hartwell Lane	2,000	Barlaston, Staffordshire	Promoted from National 5 North (11th)
Stourbridge	Stourton Park	3,500 (450 seats) (Note: Stourton Park ground capacity up from 2,000 to 3,500 following ground upgrades including a 450 seater stand.)	Stourbridge, West Midlands	Promoted from National 5 North (7th)
Winnington Park	Burrows Hill	5,000	Northwich, Cheshire	Promoted from National 5 North (4th)
Worcester	Sixways	8,477	Worcester, Worcestershire	Promoted from National 5 North (2nd)

== League table ==
1996–97 National Division 4 North table
Pos	Team	Pld	W	D	L	PF	PA	PD	Pts	Qualification
1	Worcester (C)	26	23	3	0	833	378	+455	49	Promoted
2	Birmingham & Solihull	26	19	0	7	746	391	+355	38	
3	Preston Grasshoppers	26	17	2	7	568	394	+174	36	
4	Manchester	26	16	1	9	763	514	+249	33	
5	Sandal	26	15	1	10	618	572	+46	31	
6	Stourbridge	26	14	1	11	704	579	+125	29	
7	Winnington Park	26	14	1	11	641	565	+76	29	
8	Sheffield	26	12	2	12	496	451	+45	26	
9	Kendal	26	11	1	14	541	451	+90	23	
10	Aspatria	26	10	1	15	616	713	−97	21	
11	Lichfield	26	10	0	16	544	713	−169	20	
12	Nuneaton	26	8	1	17	457	670	−213	17	
13	Hereford (R)	26	4	0	22	287	970	−683	8	Relegated
14	Stoke-on-Trent (R)	26	2	0	24	391	854	−463	4	Relegated

Rules for classification: Points are awarded as follows: 2 pts for a win, 1 pt for a draw, 0 pts for a loss. If teams are level at any stage, difference between points for and against applies.
(C) Champions; (R) Relegated

== Sponsorship ==
National Division 4 North is part of the Courage Clubs Championship and is sponsored by Courage Brewery. This was their tenth and final season of sponsorship.

== See also ==
- 1996–97 National Division 1
- 1996–97 National Division 2
- 1996–97 National Division 3
- 1996–97 National Division 4 South
