= 1995–96 National Division 3 =

Rugby union competition in England

- Countries: England
- Champions: Coventry (2nd title)
- Runners-up: Richmond (also promoted)
- Matches played: 90
- Top point scorer: 215 Ralph Zoing (Harrogate)
- Top try scorer: 12 Collin Phillips (Reading)

The 1995–96 National Division 3 (sponsored by Courage Brewery) was the ninth season of the third tier of the English rugby union league system, the Courage Clubs Championship, currently known as National League 1. New teams to the division included Coventry and Fylde (relegated from tier 2) and Reading and Rotherham (promoted from tier 4).

Following relegation last season, Coventry won the division by three points to finish as champions. They would be joined in 1996–97 National Division 2 by runners up Richmond and, owing to an increase in the number of teams in the above divisions for the following season, 3rd place Rugby and 4th place Rotherham were also promoted. There was no relegation because National Division 3 will consist of sixteen teams next season.

== Structure ==
Each side played one another twice, in a round robin system, home and away, to make a total of eighteen matches for each team. There are usually two promotion places and two relegation places, with the champions and runner-up promoted to National Division 2 and the last two teams relegated to National Division 4. Owing to a reorganisation of the league system four teams are promoted and none relegated this season.

== Participating teams and locations ==
1995–96 National Division 3 teams in England

| Team | Stadium | Capacity | City/Area | Previous season |
|---|---|---|---|---|
| Coventry | Coundon Road | 10,000 (1,100 seats) | Coventry, West Midlands | Relegated from National 2 (10th) |
| Fylde | Woodlands Memorial Ground | 7,500 (500 seats) | Lytham St Annes, Lancashire | Relegated from National 2 (9th) |
| Harrogate | Claro Road | 4,500 (500 seats) | Harrogate, North Yorkshire | 7th |
| Morley | Scatcherd Lane | 6,000 (1,000 seats) | Morley, Leeds, West Yorkshire | 5th |
| Otley | Cross Green | 7,000 (852 seats) | Otley, West Yorkshire | 6th |
| Reading | Holme Park | | Reading, Berkshire | Promoted from National 4 (1st) |
| Richmond | Athletic Ground | 7,300 (1,300 seats) | Richmond, London | 8th |
| Rosslyn Park | The Rock | 4,630 (630 seats) | Roehampton, London | 4th |
| Rotherham | Clifton Lane | 2,500 | Rotherham, South Yorkshire | Promoted from National 4 (2nd) |
| Rugby | Webb Ellis Road | 3,200 (200 seats) | Rugby, Warwickshire | 3rd |

== League table ==
1995–96 National Division 3 table
| Pos | Team | Pld | W | D | L | PF | PA | PD | Pts | Qualification |
|---|---|---|---|---|---|---|---|---|---|---|
| 1 | Coventry (C) | 18 | 15 | 0 | 3 | 524 | 264 | +260 | 30 | Promoted |
| 2 | Richmond | 18 | 13 | 1 | 4 | 476 | 266 | +210 | 27 | Promoted |
| 3 | Rugby | 18 | 12 | 1 | 5 | 395 | 284 | +111 | 25 | Promoted |
| 4 | Rotherham | 18 | 12 | 0 | 6 | 384 | 368 | +16 | 24 | Promoted |
| 5 | Morley | 18 | 9 | 2 | 7 | 336 | 328 | +8 | 20 | |
| 6 | Harrogate | 18 | 6 | 3 | 9 | 333 | 387 | −54 | 15 | |
| 7 | Otley | 18 | 6 | 1 | 11 | 278 | 441 | −163 | 13 | |
| 8 | Reading | 18 | 5 | 1 | 12 | 397 | 484 | −87 | 11 | |
| 9 | Rosslyn Park | 18 | 3 | 2 | 13 | 290 | 426 | −136 | 8 | |
| 10 | Fylde | 18 | 3 | 1 | 14 | 283 | 448 | −165 | 7 | |

Rules for classification: Points are awarded as follows: 2 pts for a win, 1 pt for a draw, 0 pts for a loss. If teams are level at any stage, the following tiebreaker is applied: Difference between points for and against.
(C) Champions

== See also ==
- 1995–96 National Division 1
- 1995–96 National Division 2
- 1995–96 National Division 4
- 1995–96 Courage League Division 5 North
- 1995–96 Courage League Division 5 South
