= 1995–96 National Division 1 =

Sports season

- Countries: England
- Date: 9 September 1995 – 5 May 1995
- Champions: Bath (6th title)
- Runners-up: Leicester
- Matches played: 90

Official website
- www.premiershiprugby.com

The 1995–96 National Division 1 (sponsored by Courage Brewery) was the ninth season of the top tier of the English rugby union league system, the Courage Clubs Championship, currently known as Premiership Rugby. Leicester were the defending champions and Saracens the promoted team.

Bath finished as champions for the sixth time, beating holders Leicester by just one point. Despite a disastrous season with 18 defeats in as many matches, West Hartlepool kept its place in the first division due to the expansion of the league from 10 teams to 12 the following season.

== Structure ==
Each side played one another twice, in a round robin system, home and away, to make a total of eighteen matches for each team. Due to the number of teams increasing from ten to twelve for the following season there was no relegation.

== Participating teams ==
Locations of the 1995–96 Courage League National Division One teams

Team	Stadium	Capacity	City/Area	Previous season
Bath	Recreation Ground	8,300 (1,000 seats)	Bath, Somerset	2nd
Bristol	Memorial Stadium	8,500 (1,200 seats)	Bristol, Avon	6th
Gloucester	Kingsholm	12,000	Gloucester, Gloucestershire	7th
Harlequins	The Stoop	9,000 (2,000 seats)	Twickenham, London	8th
Leicester	Welford Road	16,000 (Note: Ground capacity at Welford Road increased from 14,700 to 16,000 with a capacity crowd achieved versus Bath on 23 September 1995.)	Leicester, Leicestershire	Champions
Orrell	Edge Hall Road (Note: Orrell would also play one home game at the 18,000 capacity Central Park in Wigan.)	5,300 (300 seats)	Orrell, Greater Manchester	5th
Sale	Heywood Road	4,000 (500 seats)	Sale, Greater Manchester	4th
Saracens	Bramley Road	2,300 (300 seats)	Enfield, London	Promoted from National 2 (1st)
Wasps	Repton Avenue	3,200 (1,200 seats)	Sudbury, London	3rd
West Hartlepool	Brierton Lane	7,000	Hartlepool, County Durham	9th

== Table ==
Pos	Team	Pld	W	D	L	PF	PA	PD	Pts	Qualification
1	Bath (C)	18	15	1	2	575	276	+299	31	Champion; 1996–97 Heineken Cup
2	Leicester	18	15	0	3	476	242	+234	30	Qualified for the 1996–97 Heineken Cup
3	Harlequins	18	13	0	5	524	314	+210	26	Qualified for the 1996–97 Heineken Cup
4	Wasps	18	11	0	7	439	322	+117	22	Qualified for the 1996–97 Heineken Cup
5	Sale	18	9	1	8	365	371	−6	19	
6	Bristol	18	8	0	10	329	421	−92	16	
7	Orrell	18	7	0	11	323	477	−154	14	
8	Gloucester	18	6	0	12	275	370	−95	12	
9	Saracens	18	5	0	13	284	451	−167	10	
10	West Hartlepool	18	0	0	18	288	634	−346	0	

(C) Champions

== Results ==
The Home Team is listed in the left column.

Home \ Away	BAT	BRI	GLO	HAR	LEI	ORR	SAL	SAR	WAS	WHA
Bath Rugby		52–19	37–11	41–15	14–15	55–20	38–38	52–16	36–12	34–22
Bristol	5–43		22–16	25–31	29–43	33–14	30–6	21–7	9–17	12–3
Gloucester RFC	16–10	18–14		13–24	14–27	27–0	17–22	17–10	15–26	17–16
Harlequins	13–19	28–3	33–19		25–29	21–25	55–0	23–15	29–20	34–18
Leicester	9–14	43–6	28–6	19–21		22–3	32–10	31–3	15–12	48–15
Orrell	11–44	26–29	21–3	9–23	10–38		12–6	38–13	32–29	20–10
Sale	18–30	15–6	21–13	29–11	12–16	39–13		18–15	18–25	44–13
Saracens	15–21	11–24	19–16	6–13	25–21	12–9	9–24		20–24	31–30
Wasps	6–15	33–5	21–10	3–34	11–21	51–16	25–16	38–16		52–12
West Hartlepool	15–20	15–37	19–27	21–91	12–19	22–44	11–29	31–41	3–34	

Legend: Blue = home team win; Yellow = draw; Red = away team win.

== Fixtures & Results ==
=== Round 1 ===
9 September 1995

Gloucester	17 – 22	Sale

Kingsholm

9 September 1995

Leicester	31 – 3	Saracens

Welford Road

9 September 1995

Orrell	9 – 23	Harlequins

Edge Hall Road

9 September 1995

Wasps	33 – 5	Bristol

Repton Avenue

9 September 1995

West Hartlepool	15 – 20	Bath

Brierton Lane
Referee: Brian Campsall

=== Round 2 ===
16 September 1995

Bath	37 – 11	Gloucester

Recreation Ground
Referee: Stuart Piercy

16 September 1995

Bristol	12 – 3	West Hartlepool

Memorial Stadium

16 September 1995

Harlequins	29 – 20	Wasps

The Stoop

16 September 1995

Sale	12 – 16	Leicester

Heywood Road

16 September 1995

Saracens	12 – 9	Orrell

Bramley Road

=== Round 3 ===
23 September 1995

Bristol	25 – 31	Harlequins

Memorial Stadium

23 September 1995

Leicester	9 – 14	Bath

Welford Road
Attendance: 16,000
Referee: Tony Rowlands

23 September 1995

Orrell	12 – 6	Sale

Edge Hall Road

23 September 1995

Wasps	38 – 16	Saracens

Repton Avenue

23 September 1995

West Hartlepool	19 – 27	Gloucester

Brierton Lane

=== Round 4 ===
30 September 1995

Bath	55 – 20	Orrell

Recreation Ground
Referee: Ashley Rowden

30 September 1995

Gloucester	14 – 27	Leicester

Kingsholm

30 September 1995

Harlequins	34 – 18	West Hartlepool

The Stoop

30 September 1995

Sale	18 – 25	Wasps

Heywood Road

30 September 1995

Saracens	11 – 24	Bristol

Bramley Road

=== Round 5 ===
7 October 1995

Bristol	30 – 6	Sale

Memorial Stadium

7 October 1995

Harlequins	23 – 15	Saracens

The Stoop

7 October 1995

Orrell	21 – 3	Gloucester

Edge Hall Road

7 October 1995

Wasps	6 – 15	Bath

Repton Avenue
Referee: Ed Morrison

7 October 1995

West Hartlepool	12 – 19	Leicester

Brierton Lane

=== Round 6 ===
14 October 1995

Bath	52 – 19	Bristol

Memorial Stadium
Referee: Brian Campsall

14 October 1995

Gloucester	15 – 26	Wasps

Kingsholm

14 October 1995

Leicester	22 – 3	Orrell

Welford Road

14 October 1995

Sale	23 – 9	Harlequins

Heywood Road

14 October 1995

Saracens	31 – 30	West Hartlepool

Bramley Road

=== Round 7 ===
21 October 1995

Bristol	22 – 16	Gloucester

Memorial Stadium

21 October 1995

Harlequins	13 – 19	Bath

The Stoop
Referee: Chris Wright

21 October 1995

Orrell	20 – 10	West Hartlepool

Edge Hall Road

21 October 1995

Saracens	9 – 24	Sale

Bramley Road

21 October 1995

Wasps	11 – 21	Leicester

Repton Avenue

=== Round 8 ===
28 October 1995

Bath	52 – 16	Saracens

Recreation Ground
Referee: Steve Lander

28 October 1995

Gloucester	13 – 24	Harlequins

Kingsholm

28 October 1995

Leicester	43 – 6	Bristol

Welford Road

28 October 1995

Orrell	32 – 29	Wasps

Edge Hall Road

28 October 1995

West Hartlepool	11 – 29	Sale

Brierton Lane

=== Round 9 ===
4 November 1995

Bristol	33 – 14	Orrell

Memorial Stadium

4 November 1995

Harlequins	25 – 29	Leicester

The Stoop

4 November 1995

Sale	18 – 30	Bath

Heywood Road
Referee: Chris Rees

4 November 1995

Saracens	19 – 16	Gloucester

Bramley Road

4 November 1995

Wasps	P – P	West Hartlepool

Repton Avenue

- Postponed due to spectator falling ill. Game rescheduled to 20 April 1996.

=== Round 10 ===
11 November 1995

Bath	34 – 22	West Hartlepool

Recreation Ground
Referee: Ashley Rowden

11 November 1995

Bristol	9 – 17	Wasps

Memorial Stadium

11 November 1995

Harlequins	21 – 25	Orrell

The Stoop

11 November 1995

Sale	21 – 13	Gloucester

Heywood Road

11 November 1995

Saracens	25 – 21	Leicester

Bramley Road

=== Round 11 ===
30 December 1995

Gloucester	P – P	Bath

Kingsholm

- Postponed. Game rescheduled to 10 April 1996.

30 December 1995

Leicester	P – P	Sale

Welford Road

- Postponed. Game rescheduled to 17 April 1996.

30 December 1995

Orrell	P – P	Saracens

Edge Hall Road

- Postponed. Game rescheduled to 13 January 1996.

30 December 1995

Wasps	P – P	Harlequins

Repton Avenue

- Postponed. Game rescheduled to 9 March 1996.

30 December 1995

West Hartlepool	P – P	Bristol

Brierton Lane

- Postponed. Game rescheduled to 5 May 1996.

=== Round 12 ===
6 January 1996

Bath	14 – 15	Leicester

Recreation Ground
Referee: Brian Campsall

6 January 1996

Gloucester	17 – 16	West Hartlepool

Kingsholm

6 January 1996

Harlequins	28 – 3	Bristol

The Stoop

6 January 1996

Sale	39 – 13	Orrell

Heywood Road

6 January 1996

Saracens	20 – 24	Wasps

Bramley Road

=== Round 11 (rescheduled game) ===
13 January 1996

Orrell	38 – 13	Saracens

Edge Hall Road

- Game rescheduled from 30 December 1995.

=== Round 13 ===
10 February 1996

Bristol	P – P	Saracens

Memorial Stadium

- Postponed. Game rescheduled to 20 April 1996.

10 February 1996

Leicester	P – P	Gloucester

Welford Road

- Postponed. Game rescheduled to 24 April 1996.

10 February 1996

Orrell	P – P	Bath

Edge Hall Road

- Postponed. Game rescheduled to 20 April 1996.

10 February 1996

Wasps	P – P	Sale

Repton Avenue

- Postponed. Game rescheduled to 23 March 1996.

10 February 1996

West Hartlepool	P – P	Harlequins

Brierton Lane

- Postponed. Game rescheduled to 23 March 1996.

=== Round 14 ===
17 February 1996

Bath	36 – 12	Wasps

Recreation Ground
Referee: Brian Campsall

17 February 1996

Gloucester	27 – 0	Orrell

Kingsholm

17 February 1996

Leicester	48 – 15	West Hartlepool

Welford Road

17 February 1996

Sale	15 – 6	Bristol

Heywood Road

17 February 1996

Saracens	6 – 13	Harlequins

Bramley Road

=== Round 11 (rescheduled game) ===
9 March 1996

Wasps	3 – 34	Harlequins

Repton Avenue

- Game rescheduled from 30 December 1995.

=== Round 13 (rescheduled games) ===
23 March 1996

Wasps	25 – 16	Sale

Repton Avenue

- Game rescheduled from 10 February 1996.

23 March 1996

West Hartlepool	21 – 91	Harlequins

Brierton Lane

- Game rescheduled from 10 February 1996.

=== Round 15 ===
30 March 1996

Bristol	5 – 43	Bath

Memorial Stadium
Referee: Steve Lander

30 March 1996

Harlequins	55 – 0	Sale

The Stoop

30 March 1996

Orrell	10 – 38	Leicester

Edge Hall Road

30 March 1996

Wasps	21 – 10	Gloucester

Repton Avenue

30 March 1996

West Hartlepool	3 – 14	Saracens

Brierton Lane

=== Round 16 ===
6 April 1996

Bath	41 – 15	Harlequins

Recreation Ground
Referee: John Pearson

6 April 1996

Gloucester	18 – 14	Bristol

Kingsholm

6 April 1996

Leicester	15 – 12	Wasps

Welford Road

6 April 1996

Sale	18 – 15	Saracens

Heywood Road

6 April 1996

West Hartlepool	22 – 44	Orrell

Brierton Lane

=== Round 11 (rescheduled game) ===
10 April 1996

Gloucester	16 – 10	Bath

Kingholsm
Attendance: 10,000
Referee: Nick Cousins

- Game rescheduled from 30 December 1995.

=== Round 17 ===
13 April 1996

Bristol	29 – 43	Leicester

Memorial Stadium

13 April 1996

Harlequins	33 – 19	Gloucester

The Stoop

13 April 1996

Sale	44 – 13	West Hartlepool

Heywood Road

13 April 1996

Saracens	15 – 21	Bath

Bramley Road
Referee: Stuart Piercy

13 April 1996

Wasps	51 – 16	Orrell

Repton Avenue

=== Round 11 (rescheduled game) ===
17 April 1996

Leicester	32 – 10	Sale

Welford Road

- Game rescheduled from 30 December 1995.

=== Rounds 9 & 13 (rescheduled games) ===
20 April 1996

Bristol	21 – 7	Saracens

Memorial Stadium
Referee: Chris White

- Game rescheduled from 10 February 1996.

20 April 1996

Orrell	11 – 44	Bath

Central Park, Wigan
Attendance: 2,600
Referee: Chris White

- Game rescheduled from 10 February 1996.

20 April 1996

Wasps	52 – 12	West Hartlepool

- Game rescheduled from 4 November 1995.

=== Round 13 (rescheduled game) ===
24 April 1996

Leicester	28 – 6	Gloucester

Welford Road

- Game rescheduled from 10 February 1996.

=== Round 18 ===
27 April 1996

Bath	38 – 38	Sale

Recreation Ground
Referee: Brian Campsall

- Bath are champions.

27 April 1996

Gloucester	17 – 10	Saracens

Kingsholm

27 April 1996

Leicester	19 – 21	Harlequins

Welford Road

27 April 1996

Orrell	26 – 29	Bristol

Edge Hall Road

27 April 1996

West Hartlepool	3 – 34	Wasps

Brierton Lane

=== Round 11 (rescheduled game) ===
5 May 1996

West Hartlepool	15 – 37	Bristol

Brierton Lane

- Game rescheduled from 30 December 1995.

== See also ==
- 1995–96 National Division 2
- 1995–96 National Division 3
- 1995–96 National Division 4
- 1995–96 Courage League Division 5 North
- 1995–96 Courage League Division 5 South
