= 1997–98 National League 2 South =

Eleventh season of rugby union

- Countries: England
- Champions: Camberley (1st title)
- Runners-up: Henley (also promoted)
- Relegated: No relegation
- Matches played: 182

The 1997–98 National League 2 South was the eleventh full season of rugby union within the fourth tier (south) of the English league system, previously known as National Division 4 South, and was the first to be sponsored by Jewson who replaced former sponsor Courage. It is counterpart to National League 2 North, which covers the northern half of the country.

At the end of the campaign Camberley were the league champions, finishing 3 points clear of runners up Henley Hawks, with both teams promoted to the 1998–99 National League 1. There was no relegation this season in order to prevent an imbalance of teams in the leagues due to RFU changes for the following season which would see tier 2 increased from 12 to 14 teams and tier 3 reduced from 16 to 14 teams.

== Structure ==
Each team played home and away matches against each of the other teams, playing a total of twenty-six matches each. The league champions and runners up were promoted to National League 1. There was no relegation this season due to changes higher up in the English league system.

== Participating teams and locations ==
1997–98 National League 2 South teams in England

Team	Ground	Capacity	City/Area	Previous season
Barking	Goresbrook	1,000	Becontree, Dagenham, London	3rd
Bridgwater & Albion	Bath Road	5,000	Bridgwater, Somerset	Promoted from South West 1 (champions)
Camberley	Watchetts		Camberley, Surrey	4th
Cheltenham	Newlands Park		Southam, Cheltenham, Gloucestershire	5th
Clifton	Station Road	2,200 (200 seats)	Cribbs Causeway, Henbury, Bristol	Relegated from National 3 (16th)
Esher	Molesey Road	3,500	Hersham, Surrey	Promoted from London 1 (champions)
Havant	Hook's Lane	2,000 (200 seats)	Havant, Hampshire	Relegated from National 3 (14th)
Henley	Dry Leas	4,000	Henley-on-Thames, Oxfordshire	Runners up (not promoted)
Metropolitan Police	Imber Court	3,500 (500 seats)	East Molesey, Surrey	7th
North Walsham	Norwich Road	1,200	Scottow, Norfolk	10th
Plymouth Albion	Beacon Park	1,950 (450 seats)	Plymouth, Devon	6th
Redruth	Recreation Ground	12,000	Redruth, Cornwall	Relegated from National 3 (15th)
Tabard	Cobden Hill		Radlett, Hertfordshire	9th
Weston-super-Mare	Recreation Ground	3,000	Weston-super-Mare, Somerset	8th

== League table ==
1997–98 National League 2 South table
Pos	Team	Pld	W	D	L	PF	PA	PD	Pts	Qualification
1	Camberley (C)	26	23	1	2	803	372	+431	47	Promoted
2	Henley Hawks (P)	26	22	0	4	772	384	+388	44	Promoted
3	Barking	26	20	0	6	762	450	+312	40	
4	Esher	26	18	1	7	651	448	+203	37	
5	Cheltenham	26	14	1	11	627	514	+113	29	
6	Tabard	26	14	0	12	556	532	+24	28	
7	North Walsham	26	12	1	13	431	373	+58	25	
8	Bridgwater & Albion	26	12	0	14	535	664	−129	24	
9	Redruth	26	10	0	16	720	580	+140	20	
10	Weston-super-Mare	26	10	0	16	468	651	−183	20	
11	Clifton	26	8	1	17	414	611	−197	17	
12	Havant	26	8	1	17	388	643	−255	17	
13	Plymouth Albion	26	6	0	20	472	756	−284	12	
14	Metropolitan Police	26	2	0	24	320	941	−621	2 (Note: 2 points deducted)	

Rules for classification: Points are awarded as follows: 2 pts for a win, 1 pt for a draw, 0 pts for a loss. If teams are level at any stage, difference between points for and against applies.
(C) Champions; (P) Promoted

== Sponsorship ==
National League 2 South is part of the Jewson National Leagues is sponsored by Jewson. It was the first year they would sponsor the league.

== See also ==
- 1997–98 Premiership 1
- 1997–98 Premiership 2
- 1997–98 National League 1
- 1997–98 National League 2 North
