= 1997–98 National League 2 North =

Rugby union competition in England

- Countries: England
- Champions: Birmingham & Solihull (1st title)
- Runners-up: Manchester (also promoted)
- Relegated: No relegation
- Matches played: 182

The 1997–98 National League 2 North was the eleventh full season of rugby union within the fourth tier (north) of the English league system, previously known as National Division 4 North, and was the first to be sponsored by Jewson who replaced former sponsor Courage. It is counterpart to National League 2 South, which covers the southern half of the country.

The title battle was keenly contested between Birmingham & Solihull and Manchester but in the end it was the West Midlands side that was triumphant, finishing two points clear to finish as champions. Both clubs would gain promotion to the 1998–99 National League 1. There was no relegation this season in order to prevent an imbalance of teams in the leagues due to RFU changes for the following season which would see tier 2 increased from 12 to 14 teams and tier 3 reduced from 16 to 14 teams.

== Structure ==
Each team played home and away matches against each of the other teams, playing a total of twenty-six matches each. The league champions and runners up were promoted to National League 1. There was no relegation this season due to changes higher up in the English league system.

== Participating teams and locations ==
1997–98 National League 2 North teams in England
1997–98 National League 2 North teams in the West Midlands

| Team | Ground | Capacity | City/Area | Previous season |
|---|---|---|---|---|
| Aspatria | Bower Park | 3,000 (300 seats) | Aspatria, Cumbria | 10th |
| Birmingham & Solihull | Sharmans Cross | 4,000 | Solihull, West Midlands | 2nd (not promoted) |
| Hinckley | Leicester Road | 2,000 | Hinckley, Leicestershire | Promoted from Midlands 1 (1st) |
| Kendal | Mint Bridge | 4,600 (600 seats) | Kendal, Cumbria | 9th |
| Lichfield | Cooke Fields | 5,460 (460 seats) | Lichfield, Staffordshire | 11th |
| Manchester | Grove Park | 4,000 | Cheadle Hulme, Greater Manchester | 4th |
| Nuneaton | Liberty Way | 3,800 (500 seats) | Nuneaton, Warwickshire | 12th |
| Preston Grasshoppers | Lightfoot Green | 2,250 (250 seats) | Preston, Lancashire | 3rd |
| Sandal | Milnthorpe Green | | Sandal Magna, Wakefield, West Yorkshire | 5th |
| Sedgley Park | Park Lane | 3,000 | Whitefield, Greater Manchester | Promoted from North 1 (1st) |
| Sheffield | Abbeydale Park | 3,300 (100 seats) (Note: Although a 1990 club estimate was 1,100 (100 seated and 1,000 standing) this is very conservative as Abbeydale Park would experience 3,000+ crowds several times in later history in what was a relatively unchanged ground.) | Dore, Sheffield, South Yorkshire | 8th |
| Stourbridge | Stourton Park | 3,500 (450 seats) | Stourbridge, West Midlands | 6th |
| Walsall | Broadway | 2,250 (250 seats) | Walsall, West Midlands | Relegated from National 3 (13th) |
| Winnington Park | Burrows Hill | 5,000 | Northwich, Cheshire | 7th |

== League table ==
1997–98 National League 2 North table
| Pos | Team | Pld | W | D | L | PF | PA | PD | Pts | Qualification |
|---|---|---|---|---|---|---|---|---|---|---|
| 1 | Birmingham & Solihull (C, P) | 26 | 23 | 0 | 3 | 805 | 334 | +471 | 46 | Promoted |
| 2 | Manchester (P) | 26 | 21 | 2 | 3 | 1029 | 472 | +557 | 44 | Promoted |
| 3 | Kendal | 26 | 18 | 2 | 6 | 619 | 357 | +262 | 38 | |
| 4 | Preston Grasshoppers | 26 | 14 | 2 | 10 | 549 | 469 | +80 | 30 | |
| 5 | Sedgley Park | 26 | 14 | 2 | 10 | 655 | 595 | +60 | 30 | |
| 6 | Stourbridge | 26 | 14 | 0 | 12 | 685 | 605 | +80 | 28 | |
| 7 | Nuneaton | 26 | 13 | 0 | 13 | 453 | 570 | −117 | 26 | |
| 8 | Sandal | 26 | 13 | 1 | 12 | 485 | 547 | −62 | 25 (Note: 2 points deducted) | |
| 9 | Aspatria | 26 | 11 | 0 | 15 | 524 | 783 | −259 | 22 | |
| 10 | Sheffield | 26 | 10 | 2 | 14 | 557 | 539 | +18 | 20 | |
| 11 | Walsall | 26 | 9 | 1 | 16 | 539 | 723 | −184 | 19 | |
| 12 | Hinckley | 26 | 6 | 1 | 19 | 429 | 726 | −297 | 13 | |
| 13 | Winnington Park | 26 | 5 | 0 | 21 | 470 | 750 | −280 | 10 | |
| 14 | Lichfield | 26 | 4 | 1 | 21 | 365 | 694 | −329 | 9 | |

Rules for classification: Points are awarded as follows: 2 pts for a win, 1 pt for a draw, 0 pts for a loss. If teams are level at any stage, difference between points for and against applies.
(C) Champions; (P) Promoted

== Sponsorship ==
National League 2 North is part of the Jewson National Leagues is sponsored by Jewson. It was the first year they would sponsor the league.

== See also ==
- 1997–98 Premiership 1
- 1997–98 Premiership 2
- 1997–98 National League 1
- 1997–98 National League 2 South
