= 1996–97 National Division 3 =

Rugby union competition in England

- Countries: England
- Champions: Exeter (1st title)
- Runners-up: Fylde (also promoted)
- Relegated: Walsall, Havant, Redruth, Clifton
- Matches played: 240

The 1996–97 National Division 3 (sponsored by Courage Brewery) was the tenth season of the top tier of the English rugby union league system, the Courage Clubs Championship, currently known as Champ Rugby, and was the first season that saw professional rugby openly introduced into the English game. It was also the tenth and final season of sponsorship by Courage. Widespread restructuring of the leagues, including the discontinuation of National Division 4, at the end of the following season meant there a lot of new sides in the division; Clifton, Exeter, Havant, Leeds, Liverpool St Helens, London Welsh, Redruth and Walsall were promoted from tier 4, along with Lydney and Wharfedale who were promoted from tier 5, and there was no relegation from tier 2.

Exeter finished as league champions, one point clear of runners up Fylde, with both clubs promoted to the new look 1997–98 Premiership 2 (formerly National Division 2). For Exeter it would be the second league title and promotion in succession. Four teams were relegated; Walsall to the 1997–98 National League 2 North (formerly National Division 4 North) and Havant, Redruth and Clifton to the 1997–98 National League 2 South (formerly National Division 4 South).

== Structure ==
The league consists of sixteen teams, playing each other on a home and away basis to make a total of thirty matches for each team. There are two promotion places and four relegation places, with the champions and runner-up promoted to the new Premiership 2 and the last four teams relegated to either National League 2 North or National League 2 South (formerly National Division 4 North & South), depending on their location.

== Participating teams and locations ==
1996–97 National Division 3 teams in England

Team	Stadium	Capacity	City/Area	Previous season
Clifton	Station Road	2,200 (200 seats)	Cribbs Causeway, Henbury, Bristol	Promoted from National 4 (6th)
Exeter	County Ground	5,750 (750 seats)	Exeter, Devon	Promoted from National 4 (1st)
Fylde	Woodlands Memorial Ground	7,500 (500 seats)	Lytham St Annes, Lancashire	10th (no relegation)
Harrogate	Claro Road	4,500 (500 seats)	Harrogate, North Yorkshire	6th
Havant	Hook's Lane	2,000 (200 seats)	Havant, Hampshire	Promoted from National 4 (8th)
Leeds	Headingley Stadium	22,250	Headingley, Leeds, West Yorkshire (Note: For the 1996–97 season Leeds would move from Clarence Fields to groundshare with Leeds Rhinos at Headingley Stadium.)	Promoted from National 4 (5th)
Liverpool St Helens	Moss Lane	4,370 (370 seats)	St Helens, Merseyside	Promoted from National 4 (3rd)
London Welsh	Old Deer Park	4,500 (1,500 seats)	Richmond, London	Promoted from National 4 (2nd)
Lydney	Regentsholm	3,000 (340 seats)	Lydney, Gloucestershire	Promoted from National 5 South (1st)
Morley	Scatcherd Lane	6,000 (1,000 seats)	Morley, Leeds, West Yorkshire	5th
Otley	Cross Green	7,000 (852 seats)	Otley, West Yorkshire	7th
Reading	Holme Park		Reading, Berkshire	8th
Redruth	Recreation Ground	12,000	Redruth, Cornwall	Promoted from National 4 (4th)
Rosslyn Park	The Rock	4,630 (630 seats)	Roehampton, London	9th
Walsall	Broadway Ground	2,250 (250 seats)	Walsall, West Midlands	Promoted from National 4 (4th)
Wharfedale	The Avenue	2,000	Threshfield, North Yorkshire	Promoted from National 5 North (champions)

== League table ==
1996–97 National Division 3 table
Pos	Team	Pld	W	D	L	PF	PA	PD	Pts	Qualification
1	Exeter (C)	30	25	0	5	923	443	+480	50	Promoted
2	Fylde	30	24	1	5	813	439	+374	49	Promoted
3	Leeds	30	24	0	6	1209	432	+777	48	
4	Morley	30	22	0	8	928	570	+358	44	
5	Harrogate	30	18	0	12	832	599	+233	36	
6	Reading	30	17	1	12	869	631	+238	35	
7	Wharfedale	30	17	0	13	710	635	+75	34	
8	Rosslyn Park	30	17	0	13	630	620	+10	34	
9	Otley	30	13	0	17	720	766	−46	26	
10	Lydney	30	13	0	17	668	766	−98	26	
11	London Welsh	30	12	0	18	632	777	−145	24	
12	Liverpool St Helens	30	9	0	21	665	827	−162	18	
13	Walsall	30	8	0	22	640	980	−340	16	Relegated
14	Havant	30	8	0	22	580	954	−374	16	Relegated
15	Redruth	30	8	0	22	565	1116	−551	16	Relegated
16	Clifton	30	4	0	26	518	1347	−829	8	Relegated

Rules for classification: Points are awarded as follows: 2 pts for a win, 1 pt for a draw, 0 pts for a loss. If teams are level at any stage, the following tiebreaker is applied: Difference between points for and against.
(C) Champions

== See also ==
- 1996–97 National Division 1
- 1996–97 National Division 2
- 1996–97 National Division 4 North
- 1996–97 National Division 4 South
