= Steven Vile =

- Full name: Steven Jeremy Vile
- Born: 16 July 1970 (age 56) Waratah, NSW, Australia
- Height: 5 ft 11 in (180 cm)
- Weight: 183 lb (83 kg)

Rugby union career
- Position: Fly-half
Senior career
Years	Team	Apps	(Points)
1996–97	Bristol Bears	?	(?)
1997–99	West Hartlepool	?	(478)
1999–01	Bristol Bears	14	(158)
2001–02	Worcester	?	(?)
Provincial / State sides
Years	Team	Apps	(Points)
1993	King Country	3	(9)
1995	Auckland	5	(46)

Steven Jeremy Vile (born 16 July 1970) is an Australian-born New Zealand former professional rugby union player.

Born in the Newcastle suburb of Waratah, Vile was educated in Auckland, where he attended Kelston Boys' High School.

Vile was a New Zealand Schools representative player, making appearances for King Country and Auckland, before continuing his career in England. A goal-kicking fly-half, Vile was the top points scorer for West Hartlepool in both their 1997–98 and 1998–99 league campaigns, then in 1999 moved on to Bristol, newly promoted to the Premiership. He joined Worcester in 2001, as back-up to Craig Chalmers and Tony Yapp.
