= Jez Harris =

English rugby union player

- Born: Jeremy Charles Harris; 22 February 1965 (age 60) Kettering, England
- Height: 5 ft 7 in (170 cm)
- Weight: 175 lb (12 st 7 lb; 79 kg)
- School: Welland Park School; Robert Smyth School
- Occupation: Boat Builder

Rugby union career
- Position: Fly Half
Senior career
| Years | Team | Apps | (Points) |
| 1984–96 | Leicester Tigers | 225 | (1171) |
| 1996–98 | Coventry | | |
| – | Nuneaton | | |

Jeremy Charles Harris (born 22 February 1965) is a retired rugby union fly-half who played 225 games for Leicester Tigers in both the amateur and professional eras. He also played for Coventry and was player/coach at Nuneaton.

== Career ==
Harris was born in Kettering, and started his junior career at Kibworth RFC as a 10-year-old, his first session was coached by former Tigers fly-half Bleddyn Jones. He joined the youth ranks of Leicester Tigers at 14 and made his first team debut aged 19 against Saracens on 29 September 1984 at Welford Road.

Harris was considered the principal back up to fly half Les Cusworth until Cusworth's retirement in 1990 and was expected to succeeded him but instead had to wait as Brian Smith, in 1990/91, and then Gerry Ainscough, in 1991/92, were preferred ahead of him.

In the 1992/93 season he became the undisputed starting fly half playing in 32 of 37 games that season including at Twickenham as Leicester won the Pilkington Cup against Harlequins. He was the top points scorer for Leicester in the 1993/94 season and again in 1994/95. Leicester were Courage League champions in 1994-95 and Harris started in 16 of the 18 games. Considered a drop goal specialist he scored drop goals in 10 matches including a hat-trick against Bath, the second time he did this feat in league match.

In August 1995 rugby union became professional. Harris had a new rival for Leicester's fly half shirt in Niall Malone and feeling that no professional contract was forthcoming he joined Coventry in the second division. Coventry finished 3rd in his first season and lost the promotion play off against London Irish. Harris played one more season for Coventry before moving onto Nuneaton. Following the death of his father, who had watched every match he played, he retired aged 34.

Harris also played for the Midlands Division and, at the age of 28, for Emerging England. During his time at Leicester he scored 1,171 points placing him 6th highest all time for the club. His 70 drop goals is second only to Les Cusworth.
