= John Clarke (rugby union) =

- Born: John Fa'aususa Clarke; 31 May 1975 (age 51) Lower Hutt, New Zealand
- Height: 6 ft 10 in (2.08 m)
- Weight: 210 lb (95 kg)

Rugby union career
- Position: Scrum-half
Amateur team(s)
| Years | Team | Apps | (Points) |
| 1995 | Toa | | |
| 2003 | Western Suburbs | | |
Provincial / State sides
| Years | Team | Apps | (Points) |
| 1995-1998 | Wellington | 3 | (5) |
| 2003 | Horowhenua | 4 | (20) |
International career
| Years | Team | Apps | (Points) |
| 1997–1999 | Samoa | 5 | (10) |

John Fa'aususa Clarke (born 31 May 1975 in Lower Hutt) is a New Zealand-born Samoan rugby union player. He played as a scrum-half.

== Career ==
His first international cap was against Tonga, at Apia, on 28 June 1997. He was part of the 1999 Rugby World Cup roster, where he only played against Japan, at Wrexham.
