= 1997–98 National League 1 =

English third-tier rugby union season

- Countries: England
- Champions: Worcester (1st title)
- Runners-up: Leeds (also promoted)
- Relegated: no relegation

The 1997–98 National League 1, sponsored by Jewson, was the eleventh full season of rugby union within the third tier of the English league system, currently known as National League 1. For the first ten seasons Courage Brewery sponsored the league. Following reorganisation the top two divisions are sponsored by the assurance company Allied Dunbar and the rest of the divisions, including National League 1 is sponsored by the building suppliers, Jewson.

Worcester finished as champions. Due to league restructuring by the RFU, runners up Leeds, 3rd place London Welsh and fourth place Rugby Lions were also promoted to the 1998–99 Premiership 2, and there was no relegation.

== Structure ==
The league consisted of fourteen teams, playing each other on a home and away basis to make a total of twenty-six matches for each team. There were four promotion places with the top four teams promoted to the Premiership Two. There was no relegation, this season, to either National Division 4 North or South due to an increase, from twelve teams to fourteen, in the top two divisions.

== Participating teams and locations ==
1997–98 National League 1 teams in England

Team	Ground	Capacity	City/Area	Previous season
Harrogate	Claro Road	4,500 (500 seats)	Harrogate, North Yorkshire	5th
Leeds	Headingley Stadium	22,250	Headingley, Leeds, West Yorkshire	3rd
Liverpool St Helens	Moss Lane	4,370 (370 seats)	St Helens, Merseyside	12th
London Welsh	Old Deer Park	4,500 (1,500 seats)	Richmond, London	11th
Lydney	Regentsholm	3,000 (340 seats)	Lydney, Gloucestershire	10th
Morley	Scatcherd Lane	6,000 (1,000 seats)	Morley, Leeds, West Yorkshire	4th
Newbury	Monks Lane	8,000	Newbury, Berkshire	Promoted from National 4 South (champions)
Nottingham	Ireland Avenue	4,990 (590 seats)	Nottingham, Nottinghamshire	Relegated from National 2 (12th)
Otley	Cross Green	7,000 (852 seats)	Otley, Leeds, West Yorkshire	9th
Reading	Holme Park		Sonning, Berkshire	6th
Rosslyn Park	The Rock	4,630 (630 seats)	Roehampton, London	8th
Rugby Lions	Webb Ellis Road	3,200 (200 seats)	Rugby Warwickshire	Relegated from National 2 (11th)
Wharfedale	The Avenue	2,000	Threshfield, North Yorkshire	7th
Worcester	Sixways	8,477	Worcester, Worcestershire	Promoted from National 4 North (champions)

== League table ==
1997–98 National League 1 table
Pos	Team	Pld	W	D	L	PF	PA	PD	Pts	Qualification
1	Worcester (C)	26	24	0	2	1001	331	+670	48	Promoted
2	Leeds Tykes	26	21	1	4	858	407	+451	43	Promoted
3	London Welsh	26	21	1	4	848	478	+370	43	Promoted
4	Rugby Lions	26	21	0	5	733	405	+328	42	Promoted
5	Rosslyn Park	26	13	1	12	486	537	−51	27	
6	Nottingham	26	13	0	13	527	602	−75	26	
7	Newbury	26	12	2	12	639	545	+94	24 (Note: 2 points deducted)	
8	Reading	26	11	1	14	620	697	−77	23	
9	Otley	26	10	1	15	447	682	−235	21	
10	Wharfedale	26	8	3	15	476	684	−208	19	
11	Liverpool St Helens	26	8	1	17	430	767	−337	15	
12	Lydney	26	5	0	21	361	575	−214	10	
13	Morley	26	5	0	21	372	844	−472	10	
14	Harrogate	26	4	1	21	463	707	−244	9	

Rules for classification: Points are awarded as follows: 2 pts for a win, 1 pt for a draw, 0 pts for a loss. If teams are level at any stage, the following tiebreaker is applied: Difference between points for and against. There was no relegation this season.
(C) Champions

== See also ==
- 1997–98 Premiership 1
- 1997–98 Premiership 2
- 1997–98 National League 2 North
- 1997–98 National League 2 South
