= The Avenue =

Rugby Union stadium in Sunbury-on-Thames, England

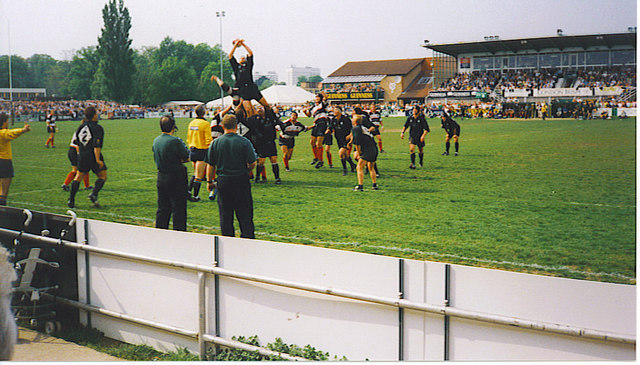
- Final Game at The Avenue, against Saracens
- Interactive map of The Avenue
- Full name: The Avenue
- Location: The Avenue, Sunbury-on-Thames, TW16 5EQ
- Owner: London Irish Holdings Ltd.
- Capacity: 6,600
- Surface: Grass

Construction
- Built: 1931
- Opened: 1931
- Closed: 2014
- Demolished: 2014

Tenants
- London Irish London Irish Amateur: 1931-1999; 1999-2014

The Avenue was a rugby union stadium and training pitches in Sunbury-on-Thames that belonged to the English club London Irish since 1931 when the team bought its 11 acres (4.5 ha). The team moved one season to the Stoop Memorial Ground thereafter to Madjeski Stadium, from 2000. For 14 more years the club kept The Avenue as its training and pre-season friendlies ground as well as Aviva A League matches. In 2014 the club began to train at its replacement, larger Hazlewood facility in the same town, including its Academy and hosting international training when Twickenham stadium hosts such tournaments and the grounds were converted to landscaped suburban housing, a sports/leisure club and care home.

== History ==
The land was purchased in 1931 for £1,280 (equivalent to £75,388 in 2025) to be the home stadium for London Irish, before they left in 1999 to play at the Stoop Memorial Ground. The ground then began to be used by the London Irish Amateur side. It was also used as a training venue for London Irish and venue for London Irish England Rugby Academy. At its peak, The Avenue could hold around 6,600 spectators. London Irish played their last senior league game at The Avenue on 1 May 1999 against Saracens with a record crowd of 6,710 in attendance.

The ground lay at 51°24′52″ north, 0°24′45″ west.

== Redevelopment ==
London Irish published in 2009 its plans to demolish its training facility to replace it with 400 homes while relocating the club offices and training to redevelop nearby Hazelwood Golf Centre.

At the planning authority's planning committee meeting, councillors of all parties opposed redevelopment, citing various grounds, including limited public transport, increasing existing peak-hour congestion, too few bedrooms per dwelling and initially a highly urban density as well as some character shortcomings. Local residents set up protest groups against such a plans such as Sunbury Opposes London Irish Development (SOLID) which shared some resources with Lower Sunbury Residents Association. On 15 April 2010, around 500 local people attended a protest march, seeking same-ground retention or community concessions over a maximised balance sheet for the club. The plans did however have the support of the Rugby Football Union, Premier Rugby, Sport England and the Rugby Player's Association.

In 2010 the club applied to demolish the grandstand and replace it with houses; an application rejected by Spelthorne Council. The plans were rejected because the development would have resulted in an unacceptable loss of an outdoor sports facility. The council duly stated it had 857 letters opposing the plans (versus 250 letters in support of which 206 from outside the borough).

The same month the club took advice and announced its wish to appeal. This led to a Local Planning Inquiry on 7 June 2011 and lasting 12 days to discuss the future of the ground. The club's Chief Executive, Andy Martin, said that the move and some such sale was needed as the ground had too few rugby pitches and that they had the senior team sharing facilities with the amateur and junior teams. To alleviate many infrastructure concerns of residents and councillors, the club downsized their plans from 400 to 194 homes. as well as making room for a health/sports club and care home. These final proposals were built.
