= 1997–98 Tetley's Bitter Cup =

English rugby union competition

Tournament details
- Countries: England
- Tournament format(s): knockout
- Date: 13 September 1997 – 9 May 1998

Tournament statistics

Final
- Venue: Twickenham Stadium
- Attendance: 65,000
- Champions: Saracens (first win)
- Runners-up: Wasps

The 1997–98 Tetley's Bitter Cup was the 27th edition of England's top rugby union club competition. Saracens won the competition, for the first time by defeating Wasps, who lost in the final for the third time. The first two rounds were unsponsored and by the third round Tetley's Brewery took over the sponsorship; the previous nine years had been sponsored by Pilkington. The final was held at Twickenham Stadium.

== Draw and results ==
=== First round (13 September) ===
Team One	Team Two	Score
Aspatria	Stockton	23-13
Barking	Swanage & Wareham	26-18
Basingstoke	Weston-super-Mare	10-39
Birmingham/Solihull	Westleigh	22-10
Bridgwater	Metropolitan Police	18-30
Broadstreet	Walsall	25-17
Camberley	Barnstaple	38-16
Cheltenham	Okehampton	138-0
Coney Hill	Preston Grasshoppers	5-16
Haywards Heath	Plymouth	26-25
Henley	Cambridge	64-12
Hornets	Havant	28-72
Launceston	Bicester	58-6
Lewes	Wimbledon	12-11
Lichfield	Manchester	10-28
Longton	Widnes	22-38
Maidenhead	Amersham & Chiltern	14-36
Matson	Bishop Stortford	8-3
North Walsham	Esher	19-18
Northern	Derby	49-3
Norwich	Bracknell	14-25
Nuneaton	Sedgley Park	11-7
Old Coventrians	Huddersfield	13-35
Olney	St Ives	18-20
Sandal	Chester	30-22
Scunthorpe	Doncaster	6-23
Selley Oak	Syston	31-19
Sevenoaks	Cheshunt	32-13
Sheffield	Old Northamptons	38-14
Sherborne	Clifton	19-30
St Benedict’s	Wigton	9-24
Staines	Redruth	35-25
Sunderland	Kendal	8-27
Sutton & Epsom	Banbury	23-25
Tabard	Harlow	23-0
Taunton	Canterbury	34-12
Tynedale	Hinckley	32-8
Vagabonds (IOM)	Old Brodleians	18-15
Vale of Lune	Ampthill	27-25
Whitchurch	Stourbridge	28-35
Winchester	Ruislip	20-0
Winnington Park	Stoke	64-12

- Cheltenham's 138 – 0 win over Okehampton was a record score for the competition.

=== Second round (4 October) ===
Team One	Team Two	Score
Aspatria	Widnes	27-18
Birmingham/Solihull	Otley	9-10
Bracknell	Metropolitan Police	35-14
Broadstreet	Huddersfield	41-3
Cheltenham	Sevenoaks	20-18
Havant	Matson	19-10
Haywards Heath	Launceston	20-22
Henley	Camberley	3-16
Kendal	Harrogate	9-5
Lewes	North Walsham	10-42
London Welsh	Clifton	65-17
Lydney	Amersham & Chiltern	67-0
Morley	Selly Oak	41-5
Northern	Tynedale	5-22
Nottingham	Doncaster	20-24
Preston Grasshoppers	Manchester	8-33
Rugby	Vagabonds (IOM)	46-0
Sandal	Nuneaton	22-16
Sheffield	Vale of Lune	42-20
St Ives	Barking	6-53
Staines	Banbury	32-12
Stourbridge	Taunton	69-5
Tabard	Rosslyn Park	0-31
Weston-super-Mare	Newbury	17-36
Wharfedale	Wigton	35-10
Winchester	Reading	12-26
Winnington Park	Liverpool St Helens	24-26
Worcester	Leeds	28-11

=== Third round (1 November) ===
Team One	Team Two	Score
Barking	Exeter	13-17
Bedford	Staines	76-15
Blackheath	Sandal	32-3
Broadstreet	Bracknell	15-21
Camberley	Kendal	32-20
Coventry	Sheffield	83-19
Doncaster	Tynedale	24-11
Fylde	Aspatria	48-5
Havant	Rugby	22-32
London Welsh	Waterloo	36-34
Lydney	London Scottish	3-45
Moseley	Liverpool St Helens	79-10
North Walsham	Rosslyn Park	11-27
Orrell	Newbury	16-26
Otley	Manchester	24-25
Rotherham	Launceston	67-15
Stourbridge	Reading	24-58
Wakefield	Morley	53-14
West Hartlepool	Cheltenham	41-5
Wharfedale	Worcester	8-29

=== Fourth round (3 & 4 January) ===
Team One	Team Two	Score
Bath	London Scottish	24-23
Blackheath	Saracens	31-59
Bracknell	Rotherham	3-26
Camberley	Newbury	10-11
Coventry	Leicester	14-50
Fylde	Rosslyn Park	20-5
London Welsh	Gloucester	18-34
Manchester	London Irish	13-36
Moseley	Sale	11-18
Newcastle	Exeter	34-10
Northampton	Bedford	31-26
Richmond	Doncaster	58-8
Rugby	Reading	26-17
Wasps	Harlequins	31-26
West Hartlepool	Wakefield	23-13
Worcester	Bristol	14-12

=== Fifth round (24 January) ===
Team One	Team Two	Score
Bath	Richmond	17-29 aet
London Irish	Rotherham	27-14
Northampton	Gloucester	30-11
Sale	Newbury	38-11
Saracens	Leicester	14-13
Wasps	Fylde	34 -8
West Hartlepool	Rugby	42-11
Worcester	Newcastle	0-10

=== Quarter-finals (28 February & 1 March) ===
Team One	Team Two	Score
London Irish	Wasps	7-41
Northampton	Newcastle	17-7
Richmond	Saracens	30-36
West Hartlepool	Sale	21-36

=== Semi-finals (28 March) ===
Team One	Team Two	Score
Northampton	Saracens	10 – 25
Wasps	Sale	15 – 9

=== Final ===
9 May 1998

Saracens	48–18	Wasps
Try: Sella; Constable; Johnson; Grewcock; Ravenscroft; Bracken; Wallace; Con: Lynagh 5 Drop: Lynagh		Try: Volley; Roiser; Con: Rees; Pen: Rees 2

Twickenham Stadium, London
Attendance: 65,000
Referee: Chris White (Gloucestershire)

Saracens
Wasps

15	(South Africa) Gavin Johnson
14	(New Zealand) Brendon Daniel
13	(France) Philippe Sella
12	(England) Steve Ravenscroft
11	(Australia) Ryan Constable
10	(Australia) Michael Lynagh
9	(England) Kyran Bracken
8	(England) Tony Diprose (c)
7	(South Africa) Francois Pienaar (player/coach)
6	(England) Ben Sturnham
5	(England) Danny Grewcock
4	(Ireland) Paddy Johns
3	(Ireland) Paul Wallace
2	(England) George Chuter
1	(Argentina) Roberto Diego Grau
Replacements:
16	(England) Marcus Olsen
17	(England) Andy Lee
18	(England) Matt Singer
19	(Ireland) Richard Wallace
20	(England) David Brain
21	(England) Greg Botterman
22	(England) Alex Bennett
Player Coach:
(South Africa) Francois Pienaar

15	(Canada) Gareth Rees
14	(England) Shane Roiser
13	(England) Mark Denney
12	(Ireland) Rob Henderson
11	(England) Laurence Scrase
10	(England) Alex King
9	(England) Mike Friday
8	(England) Joe Worsley
7	(England) Paul Volley
6	(England) Lawrence Dallaglio (c)
5	(England) Simon Shaw
4	(New Zealand) Mark Weedon
3	(England) Will Green
2	(England) Simon Mitchell
1	(England) Darren Molloy
Replacements:
16	(England) Andy Gomarsall
17	(England) Paul Sampson
18	(England) Ian Dunston
19	(Samoa) Trevor Leota
20	(England) Adam Black
21	(England) Buster White
22	(Scotland) Andy Reed
Coach:
(England) Nigel Melville

== See also ==
- Anglo-Welsh Cup
