= 1998 England rugby union tour of Australasia and South Africa =

Summary
P	W	D	L
Total
7	0	0	7
Test match
4	0	0	4
Opponent
P	W	D	L
Australia
1	0	0	1
New Zealand
2	0	0	2
South Africa
1	0	0	1

Tour chronology
- ← 1997 Argentina and Australia 1999 Australia →

The 1998 England rugby union tour of Australasia and South Africa was a series of matches played in June and July 1998 by the England national rugby union team.

== Matches ==
The tour is often referred to in rugby culture as "The Tour of Hell" due to the number of heavy defeats suffered by the England team. This was caused principally because England fielded a roster of untested and uncapped players - many of whom went on to win the 2003 Rugby World Cup five years later.

Scores and results list England's points tally first.

Opposing Team	For	Against	Date	Venue	Status
Australia	0	76	6 June 1998	Lang Park, Brisbane	Test Match
New Zealand 'A'	10	18	13 June 1998	Rugby Park, Hamilton	Tour Match
New Zealand Rugby Academy	32	50	16 June 1998	Homestead Stadium, Invercargill	Tour Match
New Zealand	22	64	20 June 1998	Carisbrook, Dunedin	First Test
New Zealand Māori	14	62	23 June 1998	International Stadium, Rotorua	Tour Match
New Zealand	10	40	27 June 1998	Eden Park, Auckland	Second Test
South Africa	0	18	4 July 1998	Newlands, Cape Town	Test Match

== Touring party ==
- Manager: Clive Woodward
- Assistant Manager:
- Captain: Matt Dawson

=== Full-back ===
Tim Stimpson (Newcastle Falcons), Matt Perry (Bath), Nick Beal (Northampton Saints)

=== Utilities ===
Josh Lewsey (Wasps), Spencer Brown (Richmond), Austin Healey (Leicester Tigers)

=== Wingers ===
Tom Beim (Sale Sharks), Matt Moore (Sale Sharks), Paul Sampson (Wasps)

=== Centres ===
Stuart Potter (Leicester Tigers), Dominic Chapman (Richmond), Steve Ravenscroft (Saracens)

=== Fly-halves ===
Jonny Wilkinson (Newcastle Falcons), Alex King (Wasps), Jos Baxendell (Sale Sharks).

=== Scrum-halves ===
Matt Dawson (Northampton Saints), Scott Benton (Gloucester), Peter Richards (London Irish)

=== Loose-forwards ===
Tony Diprose (Saracens), Steve Ojomoh (Bath), Richard Pool-Jones (Stade Francais Paris), Ben Sturnham (Saracens), Ben Clarke (Richmond), Pat Sanderson (Sale Sharks), Lewis Moody (Leicester Tigers).

=== Locks ===
Dave Sims (Gloucester), Rob Fidler (Gloucester), Garath Archer (Newcastle Falcons), Danny Grewcock (Saracens)

=== Props ===
Phil Vickery (Gloucester), Will Green (Wasps), Darren Crompton (Richmond), Graham Rowntree (Leicester Tigers), Duncan Bell (Sale Sharks), Tony Windo (Gloucester).

=== Hookers ===
Richard Cockerill (Leicester Tigers), Phil Greening (Gloucester), George Chuter (Saracens)
