= 1997–98 Premiership 1 =

Rugby union competition in England

- Countries: England
- Date: 23 August 1997 – 17 May 1998
- Champions: Newcastle Falcons (1st title)
- Runners-up: Saracens
- Relegated: Bristol
- Matches played: 132
- Attendance: 823,446 (average 6,238 per match)
- Highest attendance: 19,764 – Saracens v Newcastle (19 April 1998)
- Lowest attendance: 1,500 – London Irish v Bristol (20 February 1998)
- Top point scorer: 279 – Michael Lynagh (Saracens)
- Top try scorer: 17 – Dominic Chapman (Richmond)

The 1997–98 Premiership 1 was the eleventh season of the top tier of the English rugby union league system, currently known as PREM Rugby, and the first to be sponsored by Allied Dunbar, having previously been sponsored by Courage Brewery. The end of the previous season had seen a wide scale restructuring of the old league system, with the two leagues (formerly National Division 1 and 2) being renamed as Premiership 1 and Premiership 2, with Allied Dunbar agreeing to sponsor the top two divisions for £7,500,000. Wasps were defending champions and Richmond and Newcastle Falcons the promoted sides.

Newly promoted Newcastle Falcons finished as league champions for the first time in their history, just one point clear of runners up Saracens. Only one side was relegated this season, with Bristol enduring a nightmare season and dropping down to the 1998–99 Premiership 2, in what would be their first season outside of the top flight since the leagues began.

== Structure ==
Each side played one another twice, in a round robin system, home and away, to make a total of twenty-two matches for each team. The bottom side would be automatically relegated to Premiership 2 (formerly known as National Division 1).

== Participating teams ==
Locations of the 1997–98 Allied Dunbar Premiership One teams
1997–98 Allied Dunbar Premiership One teams in London

Team	Stadium	Capacity	City/Area	Previous season
Bath	Recreation Ground	8,300 (1,000 seats)	Bath, Somerset	2nd
Bristol	Memorial Stadium	8,500 (1,200 seats)	Bristol	10th
Gloucester	Kingsholm	12,000	Gloucester, Gloucestershire	7th
Harlequins	The Stoop	9,000 (2,000 seats)	Twickenham, London	3rd
Leicester Tigers	Welford Road	17,000	Leicester, Leicestershire	4th
London Irish	The Avenue	6,600 (Note: The Avenue capacity up from 3,600 to around 6,600 for the 1997–98 season..)	Sunbury-on-Thames, Surrey	9th
Newcastle Falcons	Kingston Park (Note: Newcastle played two home games at the 11,800 capacity Gateshead International Stadium, Gateshead on 4 May 1998 and 11 May 1998.)	6,900 (Note: Kingston Park capacity was up from 6,600 to around 6,900 for the 1997–98 season with 6,868 attending for the fixture against Saracens on 25 March 1998.)	Newcastle upon Tyne, Tyne and Wear	Promoted from National 2 (2nd)
Northampton Saints	Franklin's Gardens	9,000 (Note: Franklin's Gardens capacity up from 8,400 to around 9,000 for the 1997–98 season with a crowd of 8,989 attending the home fixture against Newcastle Falcons on 31 January 1998.)	Northampton, Northamptonshire	8th
Richmond	Athletic Ground, Richmond	7,300 (1,300 seats)	Richmond, London	Promoted from National 2 (1st)
Sale	Heywood Road	4,800 (Note: The capacity of Heywood Road went up from 4,000 to around 4,800 for the 1997–98 season.)	Sale, Greater Manchester	5th
Saracens	Vicarage Road (Note: For the 1997–98 season Saracens would groundshare with football team Watford at Vicarage Road having spent the previous season ground sharing with Enfield at Southbury Road.)	22,000	Watford, Hertfordshire	6th
Wasps	Loftus Road (Note: Wasps would continue to groundshare with football team Queens Park Rangers at Loftus Road.)	18,439	Shepherd's Bush, London	Champions

== Final table ==
Pos	Team	Pld	W	D	L	PF	PA	PD	TF	TA	Pts	Qualification
1	Newcastle Falcons (C)	22	19	0	3	645	387	+258	85	31	38	Champions
2	Saracens	22	18	1	3	584	396	+188	59	36	37	
3	Bath	22	13	0	9	575	455	+120	66	49	26	
4	Leicester Tigers	22	12	2	8	569	449	+120	64	45	26	
5	Richmond	22	12	0	10	607	499	+108	81	50	24	
6	Gloucester	22	11	1	10	512	528	−16	52	65	23	
7	Sale	22	10	2	10	605	558	+47	71	60	22	
8	Northampton Saints	22	9	1	12	493	472	+21	46	53	19	
9	Wasps	22	8	1	13	490	609	−119	47	68	17	
10	Harlequins	22	8	0	14	516	645	−129	58	73	16	
11	London Irish	22	6	0	16	457	673	−216	45	82	12	
12	Bristol (R)	22	2	0	20	351	733	−382	36	98	4	Relegated

(C) Champion; (R) Relegated

== Fixtures & Results ==
=== Week 1 ===
23 August 1997
14:15

Bath	13–20	Newcastle Falcons

Recreation Ground
Attendance: 7,000

23 August 1997
15:00

Gloucester	35–13	Bristol

Kingsholm
Attendance: 7,564

23 August 1997
15:00

Northampton Saints	23–26	NEC Harlequins

Franklin’s Gardens
Attendance: 6,027

23 August 1997
15:00

Richmond	32–12	London Irish

Athletic Ground
Attendance: 4,779

24 August 1997
15:00

Sale	10–19	Saracens

Heywood Road
Attendance: 3,000

=== Week 2 ===
30 August 1997
14:15

NEC Harlequins	20–27	Bath

Twickenham Stoop
Attendance: 6,154

30 August 1997
15:00

Bristol	21–38	London Wasps

Memorial Stadium
Attendance: 4,000

30 August 1997
15:00

Leicester Tigers	33–16	Gloucester

Welford Road
Attendance: 11,159

30 August 1997
15:00

London Irish	20–26	Sale

The Avenue
Attendance: 5,000

=== Week 3 ===
8 October 1997
19:30

Newcastle Falcons	37–12	Northampton Saints

Kingston Park
Attendance: 3,390

8 October 1997
20:00

Saracens	15–9	Richmond

Vicarage Road
Attendance: 4,134

=== Week 4 ===
18 October 1997
14:15

Richmond	37–16	NEC Harlequins

Athletic Ground
Attendance: 4,836

18 October 1997
15:00

Bath	44–15	Bristol

Recreation Ground
Attendance: 8,000

18 October 1997
15:00

Northampton Saints	25–6	Leicester Tigers

Franklin’s Gardens
Attendance: 8,186

18 October 1997
15:00

Sale	26–33	Newcastle Falcons

Heywood Road
Attendance: 4,000

19 October 1997
15:00

London Wasps	15–19	Saracens

Loftus Road
Attendance: 9,700

19 October 1997
15:15

Gloucester	29–7	London Irish

Kingsholm
Attendance: 6,287

=== Week 5 ===
25 October 1997
14:15

Leicester Tigers	33–22	Bath

Welford Road
Attendance: 16,000

25 October 1997
15:00

NEC Harlequins	52–41	Sale

Twickenham Stoop
Attendance: 6,810

26 October 1997
15:00

Bristol	22–15	Northampton Saints

Memorial Stadium
Attendance: 4,062

26 October 1997
15:00

London Irish	22–17	London Wasps

The Avenue
Attendance: 4,000

26 October 1997
15:00

Newcastle Falcons	18–12	Richmond

Kingston Park
Attendance: 4,202

26 October 1997
15:00

Saracens	42–24	Gloucester

Vicarage Road
Attendance: 5,163

=== Week 6 ===
1 November 1997
15:00

Bath	47–31	Richmond

Recreation Ground
Attendance: 8,000

1 November 1997
15:00

London Irish	19–35	Newcastle Falcons

The Avenue
Attendance: 5,000

2 November 1997
15:00

Gloucester	16–17	NEC Harlequins

Kingsholm
Attendance: 7,937

2 November 1997
15:00

London Wasps	22–38	Sale

Loftus Road
Attendance: 4,105

2 November 1997
15:00

Saracens	31–9	Bristol

Vicarage Road
Attendance: 4,258

=== Week 7 ===
8 November 1997
15:00

Northampton Saints	13–19	Saracens

Franklin’s Gardens
Attendance: 7,088

9 November 1997
15:00

Sale	76–0	Bristol
Try: Rees (3); Beim (4); Sanderson; Winstanley (2); Ellis; Mallinder; Con: Howarth (8/12)	Report

Heywood Road
Attendance: 2,500
Referee: J.P. Pearson

=== Week 8 ===
13 December 1997
14:15

Leicester Tigers	55–15	Sale

Welford Road
Attendance: 10,695

13 December 1997
15:00

Bristol	12–13	Richmond

Memorial Stadium
Attendance: 2,415

13 December 1997
15:00

London Irish	10–51	Northampton Saints

The Avenue
Attendance: 4,300

13 December 1997
15:00

NEC Harlequins	53–17	London Wasps

Twickenham Stoop
Attendance: 7,812

14 December 1997
15:00

Newcastle Falcons	37–27	Gloucester

Kingston Park
Attendance: 3,000

14 December 1997
15:00

Saracens	50–23	Bath

Vicarage Road
Attendance: 10,658

16 December 1997
20:00

Richmond	32–15	Leicester Tigers

Athletic Ground
Attendance: 2,076

=== Week 9 ===
20 December 1997
15:00

Leicester Tigers	27–3	NEC Harlequins

Welford Road
Attendance: 11,606

21 December 1997
14:30

Richmond	21–24	Northampton Saints

Athletic Ground
Attendance: 2,204

=== Week 10 ===
26 December 1997
15:00

Saracens	21–22	Leicester Tigers

Vicarage Road
Attendance: 14,291

27 December 1997
14:00

Bristol	8–50	Newcastle Falcons

Memorial Stadium
Attendance: 5,000

27 December 1997
15:00

Gloucester	26–20	Richmond

Kingsholm
Attendance: 8,328

27 December 1997
15:00

NEC Harlequins	26–24	London Irish

Twickenham Stoop
Attendance: 7,348

27 December 1997
15:00

Northampton Saints	18–10	London Wasps

Franklin’s Gardens
Attendance: 8,772

27 December 1997
15:00

Sale	11–13	Bath

Heywood Road
Attendance: 4,500

=== Week 11 ===
30 December 1997
15:00

Bath	26–3	Northampton Saints

Recreation Ground
Attendance: 8,000

30 December 1997
19:30

London Irish	10–25	Saracens

The Avenue
Attendance: 3,800

30 December 1997
19:30

London Wasps	22–18	Richmond

Loftus Road
Attendance: 4,912

30 December 1997
19:30

Sale	24–24	Gloucester

Heywood Road
Attendance: 3,500

30 December 1997
19:45

Leicester Tigers	19–25	Newcastle Falcons

Welford Road
Attendance: 16,000

31 December 1997
15:00

NEC Harlequins	38–40	Bristol

Twickenham Stoop
Attendance: 5,124

=== Week 12 ===
10 January 1998
15:00

Northampton Saints	33–14	Sale

Franklin’s Gardens
Attendance: 5,929

11 January 1998
15:00

London Wasps	26–20	Gloucester

Loftus Road
Attendance: 4,245

11 January 1998
15:00

Newcastle Falcons	46–13	London Irish

Kingston Park
Attendance: 3,500

11 January 1998
15:00

Saracens	25–16	NEC Harlequins

Vicarage Road
Attendance: 10,753

=== Week 13 ===
17 January 1998
14:00

Leicester Tigers	45–21	London Wasps

Welford Road
Attendance: 15,000

17 January 1998
15:00

London Irish	14–45	Richmond

The Avenue
Attendance: 3,500

18 January 1998
15:00

Bristol	13–14	Gloucester

Memorial Stadium
Attendance: 5,601

18 January 1998
15:00

NEC Harlequins	5–30	Northampton Saints

Twickenham Stoop
Attendance: 4,612

=== Week 14 ===
31 January 1998
14:30

Richmond	10–15	Saracens

Athletic Ground
Attendance: 3,888

31 January 1998
15:00

Northampton Saints	17–21	Newcastle Falcons

Franklin’s Gardens
Attendance: 8,989

1 February 1998
15:00

Gloucester	32–25	Leicester Tigers

Kingsholm
Attendance: 7,963

1 February 1998
15:00

London Wasps	32–18	Bristol

Loftus Road
Attendance: 4,112

1 February 1998
15:00

Sale Sharks	41–16	London Irish

Heywood Road
Attendance: 3,500

=== Week 15 ===
11 February 1998
19:15

Bath	47–3	Gloucester

Recreation Ground
Attendance: 5,500

14 February 1998
14:00

Gloucester	20–15	Northampton Saints

Kingsholm
Attendance: 5,689

14 February 1998
15:00

Bath	43–27	London Wasps

Recreation Ground
Attendance: 8,000

14 February 1998
15:00

Bristol	20–37	Saracens

Memorial Stadium
Attendance: 3,239

14 February 1998
15:00

Leicester Tigers	34–19	London Irish

Welford Road
Attendance: 10,762

15 February 1998
15:00

Newcastle Falcons	43–15	NEC Harlequins

Kingston Park
Attendance: 5,031

15 February 1998
15:00

Richmond	20–28	Sale

Athletic Ground
Attendance: 2,017

=== Week 16 ===
20 February 1998
20:00

London Irish	38–23	Bristol

The Avenue
Attendance: 1,500

24 February 1998
19:30

Saracens	42–20	Sale

Vicarage Road
Attendance: 3,722

=== Week 17 ===
28 February 1998
15:00

Bath	39–13	NEC Harlequins

Recreation Ground
Attendance: 7,200

28 February 1998
15:00

Bristol	24–27	Leicester Tigers

Memorial Stadium
Attendance: 3,143

=== Week 18 ===
7 March 1998
15:00

Leicester Tigers	15–15	Northampton Saints

Welford Road
Attendance: 14,500

7 March 1998
15:00

NEC Harlequins	41–12	Richmond

Twickenham Stoop
Attendance: 4,532

8 March 1998
15:00

Bristol	16–22	Bath

Memorial Stadium
Attendance: 5,271

8 March 1998
15:00

Saracens	33–27	London Wasps

Vicarage Road
Attendance: 12,332

10 March 1998
19:30

Newcastle Falcons	23–18	Sale

Kingston Park
Attendance: 2,638

11 March 1998
19:30

Gloucester	22–15	London Wasps

Kingsholm
Attendance: 6,629

=== Week 19 ===
14 March 1998
14:15

Bath	16–5	Leicester Tigers

Recreation Ground
Attendance: 8,200

14 March 1998
15:00

Northampton Saints	35–12	Bristol

Franklin’s Gardens
Attendance: 4,900

14 March 1998
15:00

Richmond	30–17	Newcastle Falcons

Athletic Ground
Attendance: 4,367

14 March 1998
15:00

Sale	23–13	NEC Harlequins

Heywood Road
Attendance: 4,000

15 March 1998
15:00

Gloucester	38–15	Saracens

Kingsholm
Attendance: 7,135

15 March 1998
15:00

London Wasps	19–38	London Irish

Loftus Road
Attendance: 7,935

=== Week 20 ===
24 March 1998
19:30

London Irish	23–19	Gloucester

The Avenue
Attendance: 2,300

25 March 1998
19:30

Newcastle Falcons	30–25	Saracens

Kingston Park
Attendance: 6,868

28 March 1998
15:00

Leicester Tigers	42–19	Richmond

Welford Road
Attendance: 10,146

28 March 1998
15:00

London Irish	35–49	Bath

The Avenue
Attendance: 4,800

29 March 1998
15:00

NEC Harlequins	36–16	Gloucester

Twickenham Stoop
Attendance: 4,127

=== Week 21 ===
7 April 1998
19:30

Newcastle Falcons	20–13	London Wasps

Kingston Park
Attendance: 4,500

10 April 1998
15:00

Bath	13–29	Saracens

Recreation Ground
Attendance: 8,200

10 April 1998
15:00

Richmond	43–3	Bristol

Athletic Ground
Attendance: 2,500

11 April 1998
15:00

Gloucester	27–29	Newcastle Falcons

Kingsholm
Attendance: 9,048

11 April 1998
15:00

Sale	35–21	Leicester Tigers

Heywood Road
Attendance: 4,000

12 April 1998
15:00

London Wasps	29–26	NEC Harlequins

Loftus Road
Attendance: 5,749

=== Week 22 ===
13 April 1998
15:00

Richmond	32–14	Bath

Athletic Ground
Attendance: 6,500

15 April 1998
19:15

Bristol	15–25	Sale

Memorial Stadium
Attendance: 1,547

18 April 1998
14:00

NEC Harlequins	14–23	Leicester Tigers

Twickenham Stoop
Attendance: 5,362

18 April 1998
15:00

Gloucester	27–17	Bath

Kingsholm
Attendance: 10,574

18 April 1998
15:00

Northampton Saints	39–47	Richmond

Franklin’s Gardens
Attendance: 5,350

18 April 1998
15:00

Sale	28–28	London Wasps

Heywood Road
Attendance: 3,800

19 April 1998
15:00

Bristol	5–17	London Irish

Memorial Stadium
Attendance: 2,265

19 April 1998
15:05

Saracens	12–10	Newcastle Falcons

Vicarage Road
Attendance: 19,764

=== Week 23 ===
22 April 1998
19:30

Northampton Saints	33–18	London Irish

Franklin’s Gardens
Attendance: 4,600

22 April 1998
19:45

London Wasps	18–17	Newcastle Falcons

Loftus Road
Attendance: 5,045

25 April 1998
14:15

Leicester Tigers	10–10	Saracens

Welford Road
Attendance: 16,900

25 April 1998
15:00

Bath	19–29	Sale

Recreation Ground
Attendance: 6,500

25 April 1998
15:00

London Irish	62–14	NEC Harlequins

The Avenue
Attendance: 4,200

25 April 1998
15:00

Richmond	33–22	Gloucester

Athletic Ground
Attendance: 2,000

26 April 1998
15:00

London Wasps	31–15	Northampton Saints

Loftus Road
Attendance: 5,261

26 April 1998
15:00

Newcastle Falcons	43–18	Bristol

Kingston Park
Attendance: 3,162

=== Week 24 ===
28 April 1998
19:15

Bath	20–3	London Irish

Recreation Ground
Attendance: 5,500

29 April 1998
19:30

NEC Harlequins	26–28	Saracens

Twickenham Stoop
Attendance: 4,152

29 April 1998
19:45

London Wasps	17–13	Leicester Tigers

Loftus Road
Attendance: 3,791

2 May 1998
15:00

Gloucester	31–19	Sale

Kingsholm
Attendance: 6,319

2 May 1998
15:00

Northampton Saints	16–15	Bath

Franklin’s Gardens
Attendance: 6,320

2 May 1998
15:00

Richmond	51–29	London Wasps

Athletic Ground
Attendance: 4,551

3 May 1998
15:00

Bristol	19–26	NEC Harlequins

Memorial Stadium
Attendance: 3,110

3 May 1998
15:00

Saracens	29–21	London Irish

Vicarage Road
Attendance: 8,143

=== Week 25 ===
4 May 1998
15:00

Newcastle Falcons	27–10	Leicester Tigers

Gateshead International Stadium
Attendance: 7,210

10 May 1998
15:00

Leicester Tigers	34–25	Bristol

Welford Road
Attendance: 8,678

10 May 1998
15:00

Sale	30–19	Northampton Saints

Heywood Road
Attendance: 3,000

=== Week 26 ===
11 May 1998
19:30

Newcastle Falcons	20–15	Bath

Gateshead International Stadium
Attendance: 11,750

14 May 1998
19:45

Saracens	43–20	Northampton Saints

Vicarage Road
Attendance: 9,117

17 May 1998
13:00

NEC Harlequins	20–44	Newcastle Falcons

Twickenham Stoop
Attendance: 8,897

- Newcastle Falcons are champions.

17 May 1998
15:00

London Irish	16–55	Leicester Tigers

The Avenue
Attendance: 2,500

17 May 1998
15:00

London Wasps	17–31	Bath

Loftus Road
Attendance: 9,324

17 May 1998
15:00

Northampton Saints	22–24	Gloucester

Franklin’s Gardens
Attendance: 5,500

17 May 1998
15:00

Sale	28–40	Richmond

Heywood Road
Attendance: 4,000

== Attendances ==
Club	Home Games	Total	Average	Highest	Lowest	% Capacity
Bath	11	80,100	7,282	8,200	5,500	88%
Bristol	11	39,653	3,605	5,601	1,547	42%
Gloucester	11	83,473	7,588	10,574	5,689	63%
Harlequins	11	64,930	5,903	8,897	4,127	66%
Leicester Tigers	11	141,446	12,859	16,900	8,678	76%
London Irish	11	40,900	3,718	5,000	1,500	56%
Newcastle Falcons	11	55,251	5,023	11,750	2,638	62%
Northampton Saints	11	71,661	6,515	8,989	4,600	72%
Richmond	11	39,718	3,611	6,500	2,000	49%
Sale	11	39,800	3,618	4,500	2,500	75%
Saracens	11	102,335	9,303	19,764	3,722	42%
Wasps	11	64,179	5,834	9,700	3,791	32%

== Leading scorers ==
Note: Flags to the left of player names indicate national team as has been defined under World Rugby eligibility rules, or primary nationality for players who did not earn international senior caps. Players may hold one or more non-WR nationalities.

=== Most points ===
Rank	Player	Club	Points
1	(Australia) Michael Lynagh	Saracens	279
2	(England) Mark Mapletoft	Gloucester	275
3	(Canada) Gareth Rees	Wasps	253
3	(South Africa) Joel Stransky	Leicester Tigers	253
5	(Ireland) Niall Woods	London Irish	237
6	(England) Rob Andrew	Newcastle Falcons	226
7	(New Zealand) Shane Howarth	Sale	224
8	(England) Paul Grayson	Northampton Saints	210
9	(England) Jon Callard	Bath	183
10	(France) Thierry Lacroix	Harlequins	169

=== Most tries ===
Rank	Player	Club	Tries
1	(England) Dominic Chapman	Richmond	17
2	(England) Tom Beim	Sale	14
3	(Scotland) Gary Armstrong	Newcastle Falcons	13
4	(Wales) Scott Quinnell	Richmond	10
5	(England) Will Greenwood	Leicester Tigers	9
5	(Samoa) Pat Lam	Northampton Saints	9
5	(Scotland) Andy Nicol	Bath	9
5	(England) Daren O'Leary	Harlequins	9
9	11 players		8

== See also ==
- 1997–98 Premiership 2
- 1997–98 National League 1
- 1997–98 National League 2 North
- 1997–98 National League 2 South
