= 1994–95 Pilkington Cup =

English rugby union competition

- Countries: England
- Champions: Bath (9th title)
- Runners-up: Wasps

The 1994–95 Pilkington Cup was the 24th edition of England's premier rugby union club competition at the time. Bath won the competition defeating Wasps in the final. The event was sponsored by Pilkington and the final was held at Twickenham Stadium.

== Draw and results ==
=== First round (Sep 10) ===
Home	Away	Score
Alton	Lydney	9-28
Aylesbury	High Wycombe	10-38
Camborne	Old Colleians	23-15
Ealing	Basingstoke	7-26
Esher	Bridgwater	11-0
Henley	Sudbury	10-6
Hereford	Nuneaton	14-6
Launceston	Banbury	38-3
Lichfield	Stockton	20-12
London Welsh	Gloucester Old Boys	20-15
Loughborough Students	Winnington Park	11-43
Maidenhead	Horsham	3-0
North Walsham	Okehampton	27-3
Old Albanians	Barking	3-22
Old Coventrians	Camp Hill	6-13
Preston Grasshoppers	Stockwood Park	31-3
Ruislip	Ipswich	28-3
Sandal	Wigton	18-3
Scunthorpe	Kendal	27-21
Sheffield	Birmingham	11-5
Sherborne	Tabard	16-26
Southend	Metropolitan Police	8-20
Stourbridge	New Brighton	15-10
Tynedale	Barkers Butts	35-21
Walsall	Stafford	56-8
West Park	Old Crossleyans	38-5
Weston-super-Mare	Berry Hill	19-3
Wharfedale	Stoke	20-11

=== Second round (Oct 8) ===
Home	Away	Score
Askeans	Redruth	12-19
Aspatria	Leeds	23-0
Basingstoke	Plymouth	13-10
Camp Hill	Liverpool St Helens	15-10
Harrogate	Sheffield	46-10
Henley	Launceston	5-27
Lichfield	Preston Grasshoppers	24-12
Lydney	Esher	17-16
Maidenhead	High Wycombe	14-18
Metropolitan Police	Havant	10-16
Morley	Rotherham	11-15
North Walsham	Exeter	7-32
Reading	Barking	26-15
Richmond	Camborne	47-22
Rosslyn Park	Blackheath	12-24
Rugby	London Welsh	23-10
Ruislip	Clifton	19-20
Sandal	Winnington Park	23-10
Scunthorpe	Hereford	17-16
Stourbridge	Bedford	17-35
Tabard	Weston-super-Mare	13-5
Tynedale	Otley	29-28
West Park	Broughton Park	20-0
Wharfedale	Walsall	32-16

=== Third round (Nov 5) ===
Home	Away	Score
Aspatria	Scunthorpe	14-9
Basingstoke	Clifton	29-26
Blackheath	Redruth	31-0
Camp Hill	Sandal	8-17
Harrogate	Lichfield	22-14
Havant	Richmond	13-15
High Wycombe	Tabard	22-36
Launceston	Exeter	7-30
Lydney	Reading	16-6
Rotherham	Wharfedale	33-30
Tynedale	Rugby	16-23 aet
West Park	Bedford	14-40

=== Fourth round (Dec 17) ===
Home	Away	Score
Aspatria	Bedford	32-6
Basingstoke	London Irish	3-18
Bristol	Nottingham	41-10
Coventry	Fylde	7-45
Exeter	Rugby	9-7
Harlequins	Saracens	9-5
Leicester	Blackheath	56-11
London Scottish	Bath	6-31
Moseley	Northampton	6-16
Newcastle Gosforth	Wasps	12-58
Orrell	West Hartlepool	28-7
Richmond	Tabard	24-16
Rotherham	Waterloo	19-21
Sale	Harrogate	33-0
Sandal	Lydney	5-17
Wakefield	Gloucester	19-9

=== Fifth round (Jan 28) ===
Home	Away	Score
Bristol	Leicester	8–16
Exeter	Aspatria	18–6
London Irish	Harlequins	15–40
Lydney	Wakefield	10–23
Northampton	Richmond	27–6
Orrell	Bath	19–25
Sale	Fylde	55–13
Waterloo	Wasps	13–54

=== Quarter-finals (Feb 25) ===
Home	Away	Score
Bath	Northampton	26–6
Exeter	Wasps	0–31
Harlequins	Wakefield	13–8
Sale	Leicester	12–14

=== Semi-finals (Apr 1) ===
Home	Away	Score
Harlequins	Bath	13–31
Leicester	Wasps	22–25

=== Final ===
6 May 1995

Bath	36–16	Wasps
Try: Haag 2 Clarke; Swift; Callard; Con: Callard 4 Pen: Callard		Try: Dunston; Hopley; Pen: Andrew 2

Twickenham Stadium, London
Attendance: ??,000
Referee: John Pearson (Durham)

Bath
Wasps

16	Jon Callard
15	Tony Swift
14	Phil de Glanville (c)
12	Jeremy Guscott
11	Adedayo Adebayo
10	Richard Butland
9	Ian Sanders
8	Ben Clarke
7	Steve Ojomoh
6	Andy Robinson
5	Nigel Redman
4	Martin Haag
3	Victor Ubogu
2	Gareth Adams
1	Kevin Yates
Replacements:
16	Marcus Olsen
17	Graham Dawe
18	John Mallett for Ubogu (74m)
19	Pat McCoy
20	Jon Sleightholme
21	Audley Lumsden
Coach:
Brian Ashton

15	John Ufton
14	Phil Hopley
13	Damian Hopley
12	Graham Childs
11	Nick Greenstock
10	Rob Andrew
9	Steve Bates
8	Dean Ryan (c)
7	Buster White
6	Lawrence Dallaglio
5	Norm Hadley
4	Matthew Greenwood
3	Paddy Dunston
2	Kevin Dunn
1	Darren Molloy
Replacements:
16	H Davies
17	Guy Gregory
18	Andy Gomarsall
19	Richard Kinsey
20	Garry Holmes
21	Paul Delaney
Coach:
