= RugbyFest =

English annual rugby union festival

Rugbyfest
- Date: 22–24 September 2017
- Location: Rugby, United Kingdom
- Also known as: Rugbyfest UK
- Website: rugbyfestuk.info

RugbyFest UK is an annual event designed to be the biggest celebration of rugby staged outside of a major tournament. The first festival was held from 22 to 24 September 2017 in Rugby, Warwickshire, England. The next RugbyFest festival will be Saturday 25 August 2018 at Newbold-on-Avon RFC.

== Background ==
The concept of the RugbyFest UK originated from a conversation between the former professional and international rugby union player Spencer Brown and Mark Dunkley (previous Rugby Lions, Nuneaton, and Northampton Casuals) in 2016.

RugbyFest was supported by Rugby School in 2017 in conjunction with its 450th-year celebration and provided the venue.

== Press and media coverage ==
The first public announcement was through Rugby United in January 2017.

A marketing video presents an overview of the event which was filmed around the town of Rugby with the game footage taken on the grounds of Rugby St Andrews RFC Sports club in January 2017. A further video features Spencer Brown and Mark Dunkley explaining how they developed the idea of RugbyFest. Mark explains that the idea was fostered in a local pub and how they sought support from Rugby School which was key to enabling the event. Local press reported that Bali Legends and Welsh Charitables have committed to the event on 23 June 2017.

== Events, matches, and activities ==
=== Launch dinner ===
The launch dinner was held on 27 May 2017 at the Arnold House, Rugby. The venue was selected as it was named after Thomas Arnold, headmaster of Rugby School from 1828 to 1841 when the rugby game was being developed at the school. The event was opened by Peter Green, the Headmaster of Rugby School and presented by well-known Rugby personalities, including: Roger Uttley MBE a former English rugby union player, Peter Hull MBE a British Paralympic gold medalist, Kim Oliver a former English female rugby union player, Saracens and England Red Roses international Georgina Gulliver, and Tim Stimpson, a former rugby union international fullback (and others).

=== Players & sports people involved ===
Confirmed players and personalities involved in the activities include:

- Spencer Brown (joint founder)
- Mark Dunkley (joint founder)
- Tim Stimpson (RugbyFest ambassador)
- Kim Oliver (RugbyFest ambassador)
- Georgina Gulliver (RugbyFest ambassador)
- Lenny Woodard
- Darren Ryan
- Paul Diggin
- Matt Allen
- Peter Bracken
- Richard Carter
- Ben Woods
- Michael White
- Howard Graham
- Richard Johnson
- Peter Sidoli
- Paul Volley
- Nathan Strong
- Phil Greening
- Paul Reed
- Daniel Ferani
- Gerhard Vosloo

=== Teams ===
The following teams have signed up:

- Bali Legends
- Welsh Charitables

=== World legends match ===
RugbyFest world legends match 22 September 2017

The Legends rugby union match on Friday 22 September 2017 consists of 2 Barbarian-style teams in a 15-a-side match. All players are over 35 years old and have played in top-flight rugby, with most representing their country.

=== International veterans 10's ===
Rugby league Army Vets vs. Super League Vets - 16 Vets teams play on Saturday 23 and Sunday 24 September 2017, including some leading 10’s teams on the circuit and international representation. The International Veterans tournament is made up of 16 "Barbarian" style ten-a-side teams. All players are over 35 years old, and games are shorter.

=== Other activities and matches ===
International 7's tournament
Sunday 24 September 2017
International Club League 9's
Saturday 23 and Sunday 24 September 2017
16 rugby league teams from across the UK
7's Mixed Touch Rugby competition
Sunday 24 September 2017
16 7-a-side teams, including both male and female players
International Colts
Saturday 23 and Sunday 24 September 2017
12 10-a-side teams with players between 17-19 years old
Barbarians Super League 13 vs Army League Veterans
Saturday 23 September 2017
Players from British Forces and super league teams
Inter-school Tag Rugby competition
Saturday 23 September 2017
A competition between local schools at relevant age groups
Rugby School 1st XV vs. visitors
Beach rugby exhibition
Saturday 23 and Sunday 24 September 2017
Beach rugby is a 5-a-side full contact version of the game
Women's rugby
Saturday 23 September 2017
2 "Barbarian" style teams or a women’s premiership match
Deaf rugby
Saturday 23 September 2017
England Deaf Rugby vs. Wales Deaf Rugby or Northamptonshire Police Rugby
Deaf Rugby was set up to enable deaf and hard of hearing people to get together and enjoy the sport of rugby union knowing that there are no communication barriers due to a common ground
Paralympic Wheelchair Rugby
Saturday 23 September 2017
As one of the only full-contact disability sports (also known as Murderball) was one of the biggest hits of the London 2012 and Rio 2016 Paralympic Games. The sport is open to both men women and is one of the only games which allows them to compete on the same team
Children's Legends Training
Wasps RFC community team
Rugby Football Union community team

== Beneficiaries and sponsors ==
Proceeds will be shared amongst five charities, these are:

- Wooden Spoon Society
- Matt Hampson Foundation
- J9 Foundation
- New Directions (Rugby)
- Lewis Moody Foundation.
