= Scott Benton =

Scott Benton may refer to:

- Scott Benton (politician) (born 1987), British politician
- Scott Benton (rugby union) (born 1974), English rugby union footballer
