= Windo =

Windo is a surname. Notable people with the surname include:

- Gary Windo (1941–1992), British jazz tenor saxophonist
- Tony Windo (born 1969), British rugby union footballer and coach
