= 2007 England rugby union tour of South Africa =

Summary
P	W	D	L
Total
2	0	0	2
Test match
2	0	0	2
Opponent
P	W	D	L
South Africa
2	0	0	2

Tour chronology
- ← Australia 2006 New Zealand 2008 →

The 2007 England rugby union tour of South Africa was a series of matches played in May and June 2007 in South Africa by England national rugby union team to prepare for the 2007 Rugby World Cup.

In both tests, the team, coached by Brian Ashton lost heavily against the future world cup winners. Many injured players remained at home, and it was therefore not possible for England to provide a strong opposition to the Springboks.

== First test ==
26 May 2007

South Africa	58–10	England
Try: Burger, de Villiers; Habana 2, Steyn van der Linde, Willemse; Con: Montgomery 7 Pen: Montgomery 3	report	Try: Simpson-Daniel; Con: Wilkinson; Pen: Wilkinson

Free State Stadium, Bloemfontein
Attendance: 32.000
Referee: Steve Walsh (New Zealand)

South Africa			England
Percy Montgomery	FB	15	FB	Mike Brown
Ashwin Willemse	W	14	W	Iain Balshaw
Wynand Olivier	C	13	C	Mathew Tait
Jean de Villiers	C	12	C	Toby Flood
Bryan Habana	W	11	W	Jason Robinson (capt.)
Butch James	FH	10	FH	Jonny Wilkinson
Ricky Januarie	SH	9	SH	Andy Gomarsall
Danie Rossouw	N8	8	N8	Nick Easter
Juan Smith	F	7	F	Andy Hazell
Schalk Burger	F	6	F	Chris Jones
Victor Matfield	L	5	L	Alex Brown
Bakkies Botha	L	4	L	Dean Schofield
BJ Botha	P	3	P	Stuart Turner
(capt.) John Smit	H	2	H	Mark Regan
Deon Carstens	P	1	P	Kevin Yates
		Replacements
(substituted on) Gary Botha	H	16	H	Matt Cairns (substituted on)
(substituted on) Gurthro Steenkamp	P	17	P	Darren Crompton (substituted on)
(substituted on) CJ van der Linde	P	18	F	Roy Winters (substituted on)
(substituted on) Johann Muller	L	19	F	Pat Sanderson (substituted on)
(substituted on) Pierre Spies	N8	20	FH	Shaun Perry (substituted on)
(substituted on) Ruan Pienaar	C	21		Anthony Allen
(substituted on) Frans Steyn	W	22	W	James Simpson-Daniel (substituted on)
		Coaches
Jake White (South Africa)				(England) Brian Ashton

== Second Test ==
2 June 2007

South Africa	55–22	England
Try: JP Botha, Burger; Habana 2, Januarie; Montgomery, Spies 2 Con: James; Montgomery 5 Pen: Montgomery		Try: Scarbrough; Con: Wilkinson; Pen: Wilikinson 5

Loftus Versfeld, Pretoria
Attendance: .000

South Africa			England
Percy Montgomery	FB	15	FB	Mike Brown
Akona Ndungane	W	14	W	Jamie Noon
Wynand Olivier	C	13	C	Mathew Tait
Jean de Villiers	C	12	C	Toby Flood
(yellow card) Bryan Habana	W	11	W	Dan Scarbrough
Butch James	FH	10	FH	Jonny Wilkinson (capt.)
Ricky Januarie	SH	9	SH	Andy Gomarsall
Pierre Spies	N8	8	N8	Ben Skirving
Juan Smith	F	7	F	Magnus Lund
Schalk Burger	F	6	F	Nick Easter
Victor Matfield	L	5	L	Alex Brown
Bakkies Botha	L	4	L	Roy Winters
CJ van der Linde	P	3	P	Matt Stevens
(capt.) John Smit	H	2	H	Mark Regan
Gurthro Steenkamp	P	1	P	Kevin Yates
		Replacements
(substituted on) Gary Botha	H	16	H	Andy Titterrell (substituted on)
(substituted on) Deon Carstens	P	17	P	Stuart Turner (substituted on)
(substituted on) Johann Muller	L	18	L	Dean Schofield (substituted on)
(substituted on) Bobby Skinstad	F	19	L	Chris Jones (substituted on)
(substituted on) Ruan Pienaar	SH	20	SH	Shaun Perry (substituted on)
(substituted on) Frans Steyn	FB	21		Anthony Allen
(substituted on) Ashwin Willemse	W	22	FB	Nick Abendanon (substituted on)
		Coaches
Jake White (South Africa)				(England) Brian Ashton
