= 2000 England rugby union tour of South Africa =

Summary
P	W	D	L
Total
5	4	0	1
Test match
2	1	0	1
Opponent
P	W	D	L
South Africa
2	1	0	1

Tour chronology
- ← Australia 1999 North America 2001 →

== Matches ==
Scores and results list England's points tally first.

Opposing Team	For	Against	Date	Venue	Status	Report
North West Leopards	52	22	13 June 2000	Olën Park, Potchefstroom	Tour Match	BBC Sport
South Africa	13	18	17 June 2000	Loftus Versfeld, Pretoria	First Test	BBC Sport
Nashua Griquas	55	16	20 June 2000	ASBA Park, Kimberley	Tour Match	BBC Sport
South Africa	27	22	24 June 2000	Vodacom Park, Bloemfontein	Second Test	BBC Sport
Gauteng Falcons	36	27	28 June 2000	Bosman Stadium, Brakpan	Tour Match	BBC Sport

== Touring party ==
- Manager: Clive Woodward
- Assistant Manager: Andy Robinson
- Captain: Martin Johnson

=== Full back ===
Matt Perry (Bath Rugby), Tim Stimpson (Leicester Tigers), Rob Thirlby (Bath Rugby).

=== Three-quarters ===
Liam Botham (Newcastle Falcons), Mike Catt (Bath Rugby), Ben Cohen (Northampton Saints), Will Greenwood (Leicester Tigers), Steve Hanley (Sale), Austin Healey (Leicester Tigers), Ben Johnston (Saracens), Josh Lewsey (London Wasps), Leon Lloyd (Leicester Tigers), Dan Luger (Saracens), Mike Tindall (Bath Rugby).

=== Half-backs ===
Scott Benton (Leeds), Kyran Bracken (Saracens), Ali Hepher (Northampton Saints), Nick Walshe (Saracens), Jonny Wilkinson (Newcastle Falcons), Martyn Wood (Saracens).

=== Forwards ===
Neil Back (Leicester Tigers), Steve Borthwick (Bath Rugby), Ben Clarke (Bath Rugby), Martin Corry (Leicester Tigers), Lawrence Dallaglio (London Wasps), David Flatman (Saracens), Darren Garforth (Leicester Tigers), Will Green (London Wasps), Phil Greening (London Wasps), Danny Grewcock (Saracens), Martin Johnson (Leicester Tigers), Richard Hill (Saracens), Jason Leonard (Harlequins), Andy Long (Bath Rugby), Mark Regan (Bath Rugby), Graham Rowntree (Leicester Tigers), Simon Shaw (London Wasps), Andrew Sheridan (Bristol), Paul Volley (London Wasps), Julian White (Saracens), Roy Winters (Bedford Blues), Trevor Woodman (Gloucester Rugby), Joe Worsley (London Wasps).
