= Brendon Daniel =

NZ rugby union player

- Full name: Brendon Wiremu Daniel
- Born: 19 July 1977 (age 49) Te Kūiti, New Zealand
- Height: 6 ft 1 in (185 cm)
- Weight: 208 lb (94 kg)
- School: St Stephen's School

Rugby union career
- Position: Wing
Senior career
Years	Team	Apps	(Points)
1997–99	Saracens	36	(80)
1999–01	Harlequins	22	(50)
2001	Coventry	?	(?)
2002–03	Bristol Bears	22	(40)
2003–05	Bath Rugby	20	(35)
2005–06	Section Paloise	13	(0)
2006–07	Border Reivers	?	(?)
Provincial / State sides
Years	Team	Apps	(Points)
1996–97	Bay of Plenty	15	(50)

Brendon Wiremu Daniel (born 19 July 1977) is a New Zealand former professional rugby union player.

== Biography ==
Daniel was born in Te Kūiti and educated at St Stephen's School outside Auckland.

=== Rugby career ===
A speedy winger, Daniel played for the Bay of Plenty in 1996 to 1997, before making the decision at age 19 to pursue a professional career in England, where he was signed by Saracens.

Daniel featured in Saracens' 1997–98 Tetley's Bitter Cup-winning side and scored 12 Premiership Rugby tries the following season, earning the "players' player of the season" award for Saracens. He made his way to Harlequins in 1999, swapped by Saracens for England international Dan Luger. After two seasons with Harlequins, Daniel played briefly with lower division side Coventry, then returned to the premiership with the Bristol Bears. He played with Bath from 2003 to 2005, French club Pau in 2005–06 and finally Border Reivers in 2006–07.
