= 1998–99 Premiership 2 =

Rugby union competition in England

- Countries: England
- Champions: Bristol
- Runners-up: Rotherham
- Relegated: Blackheath and Fylde
- Attendance: 150,221 (average 1,517 per match) (Note: Note that 83 home attendances are missing (see below) - so the total attendance will not be 100% accurate. The average attendance has also been taken into account with the missing games not included.)
- Highest attendance: 7,326 Bristol at home to Worcester on 9 May 1999
- Lowest attendance: 287 Leeds Tykes at home to Moseley on 16 April 1999
- Top point scorer: 305 – Steve Gough (Coventry)
- Top try scorer: 18 – Dean Lax (Rotherham)

The 1998-99 Premiership 2 was the twelfth full season of rugby union within the second tier of the English league system, currently known as the RFU Championship. The league was expanded from twelve teams to fourteen and new teams to the division included Bristol who had been relegated from Premiership 1 while London Welsh, Rugby Lions, Leeds Tykes and Worcester were promoted from National League 1. Allied Dunbar sponsored the top two divisions of the English rugby union leagues for the second season in a row. The leagues were previously known as the Courage Clubs Championship and sponsored by Courage Brewery.

Bristol, the champions, were promoted to the Allied Dunbar Premiership for season 1999–00. The runners–up Rotherham lost to the thirteenth placed team in the Premiership (Bedford) in a two legged play–off and did not gain promotion. Blackheath and Fylde were relegated to Jewson National League 1 for the following season.

== Participating teams ==
Locations of the 1998-99 Premiership 2 teams

Team	Stadium	Capacity	City/Area	Previous season
Blackheath	Rectory Field	3,500 (500 seats)	Greenwich, London	9th
Bristol	Memorial Stadium	8,500 (1,200 seats)	Bristol	Relegated from Premiership 1 (12th)
Coventry	Coundon Road	10,000 (1,100 seats)	Coventry, West Midlands	7th
Exeter	County Ground	5,750 (750 seats)	Exeter, Devon	11th (no relegation)
Fylde	Woodlands	7,500 (500 seats)	Lytham St Annes, Lancashire	12th (no relegation)
Leeds Tykes	Headingley Stadium	22,250	Leeds, West Yorkshire	Promoted from National 1 (2nd)
London Welsh	Old Deer Park	4,500 (1,500 seats)	Richmond, London	Promoted from National 1 (3rd)
Moseley	The Reddings	9,999 (1,800 seats)	Birmingham, West Midlands	6th
Orrell	Edge Hall Road	5,300 (300 seats)	Orrell, Greater Manchester	5th
Rotherham	Clifton Lane	2,500	Rotherham, South Yorkshire	4th
Rugby Lions	Webb Ellis Road	3,200 (200 seats)	Rugby, Warwickshire	Promoted from National 1 (4th)
Wakefield	College Grove	4,000 (500 seats)	Wakefield, West Yorkshire	10th
Waterloo	St Anthony's Road	9,950 (950 seats)	Blundellsands, Merseyside	8th
Worcester	Sixways	8,477	Worcester, Worcestershire	Promoted from National 1 (1st)

== Table ==
1998–99 Premiership 2 table
Pos	Team	Pld	W	D	L	PF	PA	PD	Pts	Qualification
1	Bristol	26	22	0	4	848	418	+430	44	Promoted
2	Rotherham	26	22	0	4	756	336	+420	44	
3	Worcester	26	18	0	8	716	409	+307	34 (Note: 2 points deducted)	
4	London Welsh	26	17	0	9	662	552	+110	34	
5	Exeter	26	14	1	11	591	598	−7	29	
6	Leeds Tykes	26	16	0	10	713	367	+346	28 (Note: 4 points deducted)	
7	Coventry	26	14	0	12	652	560	+92	28	
8	Orrell	26	12	0	14	566	483	+83	24	
9	Waterloo	26	12	0	14	419	634	−215	24	
10	Moseley	26	10	0	16	498	633	−135	20	
11	Rugby Lions	26	9	0	17	425	660	−235	18	
12	Wakefield	26	6	0	20	469	812	−343	12	
13	Blackheath	26	5	0	21	419	842	−423	10	Relegated
14	Fylde	26	4	1	21	375	805	−430	9	Relegated

Rules for classification: Points are awarded as follows: two points for a win; one point for a draw; no points for a loss.
- If teams are level at any stage, tiebreakers are applied in the following order: (1) difference between points for and against; (2) total number of points for.
  Notes:

== Results ==
=== Round 1 ===
5 September 1998

Exeter	15 - 22	Bristol
	Report

County Ground
Attendance: 1,690

5 September 1998

Fylde	6 - 20	Orrell
	Report

Woodlands

5 September 1998

Moseley	32 - 33	Wakefield
	Report

The Reddings

5 September 1998

Rugby Lions	18 - 12	Blackheath
	Report

Webb Ellis Road

5 September 1998

Waterloo	22 - 7	Rotherham
	Report

St Anthony's Road
Attendance: 527

5 September 1998

Worcester	22 - 7	Coventry
	Report

Sixways
Attendance: 2,500

6 September 1998

Leeds Tykes	18 - 20	London Welsh
	Report

Headingley
Attendance: 1,152

=== Round 2 ===
12 September 1998

Blackheath	16 - 20	London Welsh
	Report

Rectory Field
Attendance: 1,300

12 September 1998

Bristol	55 - 14	Fylde
	Report

Memorial Stadium
Attendance: 4,527

12 September 1998

Coventry	21 - 15	Waterloo
	Report

Coundon Road

12 September 1998

Moseley	27 - 22	Leeds Tykes
	Report

The Reddings
Attendance: 503

12 September 1998

Orrell	32 - 3	Rugby Lions
	Report

Edge Hall Road

12 September 1998

Rotherham	28 - 17	Exeter
	Report

Clifton Lane

12 September 1998

Wakefield	22 - 48	Worcester
	Report

College Grove
Attendance: 600

=== Round 3 ===
19 September 1998

Exeter	31 - 25	Coventry
	Report

County Ground
Attendance: 670

19 September 1998

Fylde	P - P	Rotherham

- Postponed. Game rescheduled for 20 February 1999.

19 September 1998

London Welsh	24 - 17	Orrell
	Report

Old Deer Park
Attendance: 1,600

19 September 1998

Rugby Lions	20 - 30	Bristol
	Report

Webb Ellis Road
Attendance: 763

19 September 1998

Waterloo	36 - 25	Wakefield
	Report

St Anthony's Road

19 September 1998

Worcester	23 - 8	Moseley
	Report

Sixways
Attendance: 3,500

20 September 1998

Leeds Tykes	60 - 6	Blackheath
	Report

Headingley
Attendance: 617

=== Round 4 ===
26 September 1998

Bristol	37 - 3	London Welsh
	Report

Memorial Stadium
Attendance: 3,459

26 September 1998

Coventry	64 - 9	Fylde
	Report

Coundon Road

26 September 1998

Moseley	13 - 15	Waterloo
	Report

The Reddings

26 September 1998

Orrell	60 - 3	Blackheath
	Report

Edge Hall Road

26 September 1998

Rotherham	44 - 0	Rugby Lions
	Report

Clifton Lane

26 September 1998

Wakefield	19 - 27	Exeter
	Report

College Grove
Attendance: 600

26 September 1998

Worcester	24 - 19	Leeds Tykes
	Report

Sixways
Attendance: 4,000

=== Round 5 ===
3 October 1998

Blackheath	9 - 41	Bristol
	Report

Rectory Field

3 October 1998

Exeter	20 - 8	Moseley
	Report

County Ground
Attendance: 880

3 October 1998

Fylde	20 - 18	Wakefield
	Report

Woodlands

3 October 1998

London Welsh	13 - 27	Rotherham
	Report

Old Deer Park
Attendance: 1,450

3 October 1998

Orrell	11 - 13	Leeds Tykes
	Report

Edge Hall Road
Attendance: 700

3 October 1998

Rugby Lions	17 - 20	Coventry
	Report

Webb Ellis Road

3 October 1998

Waterloo	31 - 26	Worcester
	Report

St Anthony's Road
Attendance: 550

=== Round 6 ===
10 October 1998

Bristol	29 - 19	Orrell
	Report

Memorial Stadium
Attendance: 3,477

10 October 1998

Coventry	63 - 19	London Welsh
	Report

Coundon Road
Attendance: 1,360

10 October 1998

Moseley	44 - 22	Fylde
	Report

The Reddings

10 October 1998

Rotherham	46 - 3	Blackheath
	Report

Clifton Lane

10 October 1998

Wakefield	22 - 26	Rugby Lions
	Report

College Grove

10 October 1998

Waterloo	13 - 12	Leeds Tykes
	Report

St Anthony's Road
Attendance: 500

10 October 1998

Worcester	40 - 15	Exeter
	Report

Sixways
Attendance: 2,122

=== Round 7 ===
17 October 1998

Blackheath	18 - 30	Coventry
	Report

Rectory Field

17 October 1998

Exeter	41 - 14	Waterloo
	Report

County Ground

17 October 1998

Fylde	8 - 17	Worcester
	Report

Woodlands
Attendance: 650

17 October 1998

Leeds Tykes	13 - 16	Bristol
	Report

Headingley
Attendance: 700

17 October 1998
14:45

London Welsh	45 - 21	Wakefield
	Report

Old Deer Park
Attendance: 1,300

17 October 1998

Orrell	19 - 12	Rotherham
	Report

Edge Hall Road
Attendance: 1,100

17 October 1998

Rugby Lions	30 - 8	Moseley
	Report

Webb Ellis Road

=== Round 8 ===
24 October 1998

Coventry	26 - 14	Orrell
	Report

Coundon Road

24 October 1998

Exeter	13 - 11	Leeds Tykes
	Report

County Ground
Attendance: 800

24 October 1998

Moseley	16 - 31	London Welsh
	Report

The Reddings
Attendance: 631

24 October 1998

Rotherham	16 - 5	Bristol
	Report

Clifton Lane

24 October 1998

Wakefield	19 - 9	Blackheath
	Report

College Grove

24 October 1998

Waterloo	27 - 6	Fylde
	Report

St Anthony's Road

24 October 1998

Worcester	29 - 6	Rugby Lions
	Report

Sixways
Attendance: 1,763

=== Round 9 ===
30 October 1998

Bristol	14 - 12	Coventry
	Report

Memorial Stadium
Attendance: 4,683

31 October 1998

Blackheath	14 - 18	Moseley
	Report

Rectory Field

31 October 1998
14:30

Fylde	26 - 26	Exeter
	Report

Woodlands
Attendance: 400

31 October 1998
14:30

London Welsh	14 - 22	Worcester
	Report

Old Deer Park
Attendance: 1,400

31 October 1998

Orrell	24 - 5	Wakefield
	Report

Edge Hall Road

31 October 1998

Rugby Lions	20 - 9	Waterloo
	Report

Webb Ellis Road

1 November 1998

Leeds Tykes	15 - 10	Rotherham
	Report

Headingley
Attendance: 2,682

=== Round 10 ===
7 November 1998

Coventry	22 - 12	Rotherham
	Report

Coundon Road
Attendance: 1,200

7 November 1998

Exeter	7 - 23	Rugby Lions
	Report

County Ground

7 November 1998

Fylde	6 - 26	Leeds Tykes
	Report

Woodlands
Attendance: 650

7 November 1998

Moseley	25 - 3	Orrell
	Report

The Reddings

7 November 1998

Wakefield	15 - 46	Bristol
	Report

College Grove
Attendance: 450

7 November 1998
14:15

Waterloo	12 - 10	London Welsh
	Report

St Anthony's Road
Attendance: 900

7 November 1998

Worcester	21 - 9	Blackheath
	Report

Sixways
Attendance: 2,032

=== Round 11 ===
21 November 1998

Blackheath	18 - 24	Waterloo
	Report

Rectory Field

21 November 1998
14:00

London Welsh	62 - 27	Exeter
	Report

Old Deer Park
Attendance: 1,100

21 November 1998

Orrell	9 - 13	Worcester
	Report

Edge Hall Road
Attendance: 1,200

21 November 1998

Rotherham	34 - 7	Wakefield
	Report

Clifton Lane

21 November 1998

Rugby Lions	30 - 16	Fylde
	Report

Webb Ellis Road

22 November 1998

Bristol	58 - 18	Moseley
	Report

Memorial Stadium
Attendance: 2,304

22 November 1998

Leeds Tykes	36 - 12	Coventry
	Report

Headingley
Attendance: 760

=== Round 12 ===
12 December 1998

Exeter	26 - 7	Blackheath
	Report

County Ground

12 December 1998
14:15

London Welsh	36 - 15	Fylde
	Report

Old Deer Park
Attendance: 750

12 December 1998

Moseley	6 - 16	Rotherham
	Report

The Reddings
Attendance: 560

12 December 1998

Rugby Lions	9 - 18	Leeds Tykes
	Report

Webb Ellis Road
Attendance: 600

12 December 1998

Wakefield	10 - 18	Coventry
	Report

College Grove

12 December 1998

Waterloo	10 - 17	Orrell
	Report

St Anthony's Road

12 December 1998

Worcester	20 - 9	Bristol
	Report

Sixways
Attendance: 3,900

=== Round 13 ===
19 December 1998

Blackheath	24 - 17	Fylde
	Report

Rectory Field

19 December 1998

Bristol	36 - 8	Waterloo
	Report

Memorial Stadium
Attendance: 2,397

19 December 1998

Coventry	21 - 46	Moseley
	Report

Coundon Road

19 December 1998
14:00

London Welsh	11 - 7	Rugby Lions
	Report

Old Deer Park
Attendance: 800

19 December 1998

Orrell	21 - 23	Exeter
	Report

Edge Hall Road
Attendance: 1,000

19 December 1998

Rotherham	29 - 19	Worcester
	Report

Clifton Lane
Attendance: 1,520

20 December 1998

Leeds Tykes	38 - 0	Wakefield
	Report

Headingley
Attendance: 1,211

=== Round 14 ===
2 January 1999

Coventry	27 - 33	Leeds Tykes
	Report

Coundon Road
Attendance: 1,000

2 January 1999

Exeter	16 - 17	London Welsh
	Report

County Ground

2 January 1999

Fylde	6 - 14	Rugby Lions
	Report

Woodlands

2 January 1999

Moseley	6 - 43	Bristol
	Report

The Reddings

2 January 1999

Wakefield	13 - 40	Rotherham
	Report

College Grove
Attendance: 800

2 January 1999

Waterloo	31 - 25	Blackheath
	Report

St Anthony's Road

2 January 1999

Worcester	17 - 0	Orrell
	Report

Sixways
Attendance: 2,336

=== Round 15 ===
16 January 1999

Blackheath	3 - 51	Worcester
	Report

Rectory Field
Attendance: 600

16 January 1999

Bristol	35 - 19	Wakefield
	Report

Memorial Stadium
Attendance: 2,516

16 January 1999
14:00

London Welsh	49 - 17	Waterloo
	Report

Old Deer Park
Attendance: 1,100

16 January 1999

Orrell	20 - 14	Moseley
	Report

Edge Hall Road

16 January 1999

Rotherham	19 - 12	Coventry
	Report

Clifton Lane

16 January 1999

Rugby Lions	P - P	Exeter

- Postponed. Game rescheduled for 20 March 1999.

17 January 1999

Leeds Tykes	48 - 0	Fylde
	Report

Headingley
Attendance: 921

=== Round 16 ===
23 January 1999

Coventry	P - P	Bristol

- Postponed. Game rescheduled for 21 February 1999.

23 January 1999

Exeter	42 - 10	Fylde
	Report

County Ground

23 January 1999

Moseley	22 - 16	Blackheath
	Report

The Reddings

23 January 1999

Rotherham	25 - 10	Leeds Tykes
	Report

Clifton Lane

23 January 1999

Wakefield	25 - 13	Orrell
	Report

College Grove

23 January 1999

Waterloo	11 - 3	Rugby Lions
	Report

St Anthony's Road

23 January 1999
14:30

Worcester	14 - 12	London Welsh
	Report

Sixways
Attendance: 3,600

=== Round 17 ===
6 February 1999

Blackheath	28 - 20	Wakefield
	Report

Rectory Field

6 February 1999

Bristol	31 - 36	Rotherham
	Report

Memorial Stadium
Attendance: 2,496

6 February 1999

Fylde	24 - 5	Waterloo
	Report

Woodlands

6 February 1999
14:00

London Welsh	26 - 24	Moseley
	Report

Old Deer Park
Attendance: 600

6 February 1999

Orrell	31 - 0	Coventry
	Report

Edge Hall Road

6 February 1999

Rugby Lions	23 - 36	Worcester
	Report

Webb Ellis Road
Attendance: 1,200

7 February 1999

Leeds Tykes	44 - 7	Exeter
	Report

Headingley
Attendance: 800

=== Round 18 ===
13 February 1999

Bristol	20 - 5	Leeds Tykes
	Report

Memorial Stadium
Attendance: 2,012

13 February 1999

Coventry	35 - 8	Blackheath
	Report

Coundon Road

13 February 1999

Moseley	35 - 20	Rugby Lions
	Report

The Reddings

13 February 1999

Rotherham	47 - 10	Orrell
	Report

Clifton Lane

13 February 1999
14:30

Wakefield	16 - 30	London Welsh
	Report

College Grove
Attendance: 600

13 February 1999
14:15

Waterloo	11 - 13	Exeter
	Report

St Anthony's Road
Attendance: 400

13 February 1999

Worcester	56 - 0	Fylde
	Report

Sixways
Attendance: 2,316

=== Round 3 & 16 (Rescheduled games) ===
20 February 1999

Fylde	5 - 34	Rotherham
	Report

Woodlands
Attendance: 600

21 February 1999

Coventry	22 - 19	Bristol
	Report

Coundon Road
Attendance: 1,500

=== Round 19 ===
26 February 1999

Blackheath	19 - 29	Rotherham
	Report

Rectory Field
Attendance: 600

27 February 1999

Exeter	27 - 23	Worcester
	Report

County Ground

27 February 1999

Fylde	17 - 8	Moseley
	Report

Woodlands

27 February 1999

Orrell	32 - 34	Bristol
	Report

Edge Hall Road
Attendance: 1,000

27 February 1999

Rugby Lions	17 - 23	Wakefield
	Report

Webb Ellis Road

27 February 1999
14:30

London Welsh	42 - 34	Coventry
	Report

Old Deer Park
Attendance: 1,600

28 February 1999

Leeds Tykes	9 - 10	Waterloo
	Report

Headingley
Attendance: 400

=== Round 20 ===
13 March 1999

Bristol	50 - 17	Blackheath
	Report

Memorial Stadium
Attendance: 2,353

13 March 1999

Coventry	19 - 21	Rugby Lions
	Report

Coundon Road

13 March 1999

Moseley	12 - 15	Exeter
	Report

The Reddings

13 March 1999
14:15

Rotherham	28 - 8	London Welsh
	Report

Clifton Lane

13 March 1999

Wakefield	27 - 11	Fylde
	Report

College Grove

13 March 1999

Worcester	41 - 15	Waterloo
	Report

Sixways
Attendance: 2,600

14 March 1999

Leeds Tykes	20 - 7	Orrell
	Report

Headingley
Attendance: 620

=== Round 15 (Rescheduled game) ===
20 March 1999

Rugby Lions	13 - 9	Exeter
	Report

Webb Ellis Road

=== Round 21 ===
27 March 1999

Blackheath	15 - 9	Orrell
	Report

Rectory Field

27 March 1999

Exeter	37 - 13	Wakefield
	Report

County Ground

27 March 1999

Fylde	27 - 22	Coventry
	Report

Woodlands

27 March 1999

Leeds Tykes	24 - 16	Worcester
	Report

Headingley
Attendance: 530

27 March 1999

London Welsh	6 - 25	Bristol
	Report

Old Deer Park
Attendance: 2,400

27 March 1999

Rugby Lions	10 - 33	Rotherham
	Report

Webb Ellis Road
Attendance: 950

27 March 1999

Waterloo	8 - 32	Moseley
	Report

St Anthony's Road

=== Round 22 ===
3 April 1999

Blackheath	22 - 37	Leeds Tykes
	Report

Rectory Field
Attendance: 500

3 April 1999

Bristol	49 - 13	Rugby Lions
	Report

Memorial Stadium
Attendance: 2,615

3 April 1999

Coventry	20 - 13	Exeter
	Report

Coundon Road

3 April 1999

Moseley	18 - 16	Worcester
	Report

The Reddings
Attendance: 1,199

3 April 1999

Orrell	18 - 15	London Welsh
	Report

Edge Hall Road
Attendance: 750

3 April 1999

Rotherham	43 - 16	Fylde
	Report

Clifton Lane

3 April 1999

Wakefield	14 - 20	Waterloo
	Report

College Grove

=== Round 26 (Rescheduled game) ===
10 April 1999

Blackheath	26 - 41	Exeter
	Report

Rectory Field

- Game brought forward from 8 May 1999.

=== Round 23 ===
16 April 1999

Leeds Tykes	50 - 8	Moseley
	Report

Headingley
Attendance: 287

17 April 1999

Exeter	24 - 35	Rotherham
	Report

County Ground
Attendance: 2,000

17 April 1999

Fylde	39 - 43	Bristol
	Report

Woodlands
Attendance: 700

17 April 1999

London Welsh	71 - 22	Blackheath
	Report

Old Deer Park
Attendance: 1,300

17 April 1999

Rugby Lions	29 - 41	Orrell
	Report

Webb Ellis Road

17 April 1999

Waterloo	24 - 25	Coventry
	Report

St Anthony's Road

17 April 1999

Worcester	67 - 19	Wakefield
	Report

Sixways
Attendance: 2,600

=== Round 24 ===
24 April 1999

Blackheath	43 - 20	Rugby Lions
	Report

Rectory Field

24 April 1999

Bristol	36 - 17	Exeter
	Report

Memorial Stadium
Attendance: 3,204

24 April 1999

Coventry	26 - 17	Worcester
	Report

Coundon Road
Attendance: 1,400

24 April 1999

Orrell	28 - 18	Fylde
	Report

Edge Hall Road

24 April 1999

Rotherham	44 - 3	Waterloo
	Report

Clifton Lane

24 April 1999

Wakefield	38 - 20	Moseley
	Report

College Grove

25 April 1999

London Welsh	24 - 17	Leeds Tykes
	Report

Old Deer Park
Attendance: 1,400

=== Round 25 ===
1 May 1999

Exeter	42 - 32	Orrell
	Report

County Ground

1 May 1999

Fylde	26 - 27	Blackheath
	Report

Woodlands

1 May 1999

Moseley	30 - 29	Coventry
	Report

The Reddings

1 May 1999

Rugby Lions	12 - 33	London Welsh
	Report

Webb Ellis Road

1 May 1999

Waterloo	13 - 44	Bristol
	Report

St Anthony's Road
Attendance: 900

1 May 1999

Worcester	27 - 35	Rotherham
	Report

Sixways
Attendance: 3,100

2 May 1999

Wakefield	13 - 51	Leeds Tykes
	Report

College Grove
Attendance: 450

=== Round 26 ===
8 May 1999

Blackheath	P - P	Exeter Chiefs

- Game brought forward to 10 April 1999.

8 May 1999

Coventry	40 - 13	Wakefield
	Report

Coundon Road

8 May 1999

Fylde	11 - 21	London Welsh
	Report

Woodlands
Attendance: 500

8 May 1999

Orrell	59 - 15	Waterloo
	Report

Edge Hall Road

8 May 1999

Rotherham	27 - 0	Moseley
	Report

Clifton Lane
Attendance: 3,000

9 May 1999

Bristol	21 - 11	Worcester
	Report

Memorial Stadium
Attendance: 7,326

9 May 1999

Leeds Tykes	64 - 21	Rugby Lions
	Report

Headingley
Attendance: 550

== Total Season Attendances ==
Club	Home Games	Total	Average	Highest	Lowest	% Capacity
Blackheath	4 (Note: Missing home attendances v Bristol on 3 October 1998, Coventry on 17 October 1998, Moseley on 31 October 1998, Waterloo on 21 November 1998, Fylde on 19 December 1998, Wakefield on 6 February 1999, Orrell on 27 March 1999, Exeter on 10 April 1999 and Rugby Lions on 24 April 1999.)	3,000	750	1,300	500	13%
Bristol	13	43,369	3,336	7,326	2,012	39%
Coventry	5 (Note: Missing home attendances v Waterloo on 12 September 1998, Fylde on 26 September 1998, Orrell on 24 October 1998, Moseley on 19 December 1998, Blackheath on 13 February 1999, Rugby Lions on 13 March 1999, Exeter on 3 April 1999 and Wakefield on 8 May 1999.)	6,460	1,292	1,500	1,000	13%
Exeter	5 (Note: Missing home attendances v Waterloo on 17 October 1998, Rugby Lions on 7 November 1998, Blackheath on 12 December 1998, London Welsh on 2 January 1999, Fylde on 23 January 1999, Worcester on 27 February 1999, Wakefield on 27 March 1999 and Orrell on 1 May 1999.)	6,040	1,208	2,000	670	21%
Fylde	5 (Note: Missing home attendances v Orrell on 5 September 1998, Wakefield on 3 October 1998, Rugby Lions on 2 January 1999, Waterloo on 6 February 1999, Moseley on 27 February 1999, Coventry on 27 March 1999 and Blackheath on 1 May 1999.)	3,000	600	700	400	8%
Leeds Tykes	13	11,230	864	2,682	287	4%
London Welsh	13	16,800	1,292	2,400	600	29%
Moseley	4 (Note: Missing home attendances v Wakefield on 5 September 1998, Waterloo on 26 September 1998, Fylde on 10 October 1998, Orrell on 7 November 1998, Bristol on 2 January 1999, Blackheath on 23 January 1999, Rugby Lions on 13 February 1999, Exeter on 13 March 1999 and Coventry on 1 May 1999.)	2,893	723	1,199	503	7%
Orrell	6 (Note: Missing home attendances v Rugby Lions on 12 September 1998, Blackheath on 26 September 1998, Wakefield on 31 October 1998, Moseley on 16 January 1999, Coventry on 6 February 1999, Fylde on 24 April 1999 and Waterloo on 8 May 1999.)	5,750	958	1,200	700	18%
Rotherham	2 (Note: Missing home attendances v Exeter on 12 September 1998, Rugby Lions on 26 September 1998, Blackheath on 10 October 1998, Bristol on 24 October 1998, Wakefield on 21 November 1998, Coventry on 16 January 1999, Leeds Tykes on 23 January 1999, Orrell on 13 February 1999, London Welsh on 13 March 1999, Fylde on 3 April 1999 and Waterloo on 24 April 1999.)	4,520	2,260	3,000	1,520	90%
Rugby Lions	4 (Note: Missing home attendances v Blackheath on 5 September 1998, Coventry on 3 October 1998, Moseley on 17 October 1998, Waterloo on 31 October 1998, Fylde on 21 November 1998, Wakefield on 27 February 1999, Exeter on 20 March 1999, Orrell on 7 April 1999 and London Welsh on 1 May 1999.)	3,513	878	1,200	600	27%
Wakefield	6 (Note: Missing home attendances v Rugby Lions on 10 October 1998, Blackheath on 24 October 1998, Coventry on 12 December 1998, Orrell on 23 January 1999, Fylde on 13 March 1999, Waterloo on 3 April 1999 and Moseley on 24 April 1999.)	3,500	583	800	450	15%
Waterloo	6 (Note: Missing home attendances v Wakefield on 19 September 1998, Fylde on 24 October 1998, Orrell on 12 December 1998, Blackheath on 2 January 1999, Rugby Lions on 23 January 1999, Moseley on 27 March 1999 and Coventry on 17 April 1999.)	3,777	630	900	400	6%
Worcester	13	36,369	2,798	4,000	1,763	33%

== Individual statistics ==
- Note that points scorers includes tries as well as conversions, penalties and drop goals.

=== Top points scorers ===
Rank	Player	Team	Appearances	Points
1	(England) Steve Gough	Coventry	26	305
2	(Tonga) Sateki Tuipulotu	Leeds Tykes	22	250
3	(England) Bryan Easson	Exeter	26	241
4	(England) Simon Verbickas	Orrell	23	224
5	(England) Lyndon Griffiths	Waterloo	26	198
6	(England) Martyn Davies	Rugby Lions	23	195
7	(England) Paul Hull	Bristol	21	166
8	(New Zealand) Richard Le Bas	Worcester	23	159
9	(Zimbabwe) Doug Trivella	Rotherham	17	149
10	(England) John Liley	Worcester	21	143

=== Top try scorers ===
Rank	Player	Team	Appearances	Tries
1	(England) Dean Lax	Rotherham	22	18
2	(England) Ben Wade	Rotherham	25	16
3	(England) Andy Smallwood	Coventry	22	15
3	(England) Andrew Currier	London Welsh	26	15
4	(Wales) Lenny Woodard	London Welsh	15	14
5	(Fiji) Luke Nabaro	Bristol	6	13
5	(Australia) Adam Larkin	Bristol	15	13
5	(England) Nick Baxter	Worcester	16	13
5	(England) Simon Verbickas	Orrell	23	13
5	(Samoa) John Clarke	Blackheath	13	12

== Season records ==
=== Team ===
Largest home win — 57 pts

60 - 3 Orrell at home to Blackheath on 26 September 1998

Largest away win — 48 pts

51 - 3 Worcester away to Blackheath on 16 January 1999

Most points scored — 77 pts

71 - 22 London Welsh at home to Blackheath on 17 April 1999

Most tries in a match — 11 (x2)

London Welsh at home to Blackheath on 17 April 1999
Worcester at home to Wakefield on 17 April 1999

Most conversions in a match — 8 (x2)

Coventry at home to Fylde on 26 September 1998
London Welsh at home to Blackheath on 17 April 1999

Most penalties in a match — 7

Leeds Tykes away to Coventry on 2 January 1999

Most drop goals in a match — 1

N/A - multiple teams

=== Player ===
Most points in a match — 34

(England) Steve Gough for Coventry at home to London Welsh on 10 October 1998

Most tries in a match — 5

(Fiji) Luke Nabaro for Bristol at home to Blackheath on 13 March 1999

Most conversions in a match — 8 (x2)

(England) Steve Gough for Coventry at home to Fylde on 26 September 1998
(Wales) Craig Raymond for London Welsh at home to Blackheath on 17 April 1999

Most penalties in a match — 7

(Tonga) Sateki Tuipulotu for Leeds Tykes away to Coventry on 2 January 1999

Most drop goals in a match — 1

N/A - multiple players

=== Attendances ===
Highest — 7,326

Bristol at home to Worcester on 9 May 1999

Lowest — 287 (Note: As there are quite a few attendances missing it is possible that there was a lower attendance than this during this season.)

Leeds Tykes at home to Moseley on 16 April 1999

Highest Average Attendance — 3,336

Bristol

Lowest Average Attendance — 583 (Note: As Wakefield had quite a few missing attendances it is quite possible that their average attendance was lower than this.)

Wakefield

== See also ==
- 1998–99 Premiership 1
- 1998–99 National League 1
- 1998–99 National League 2 North
- 1998–99 National League 2 South
