= Darren Crompton =

England international rugby union footballer

- Born: 12 September 1972 (age 54) Exeter, England
- Height: 6 ft 2 in (1.88 m)
- Weight: 18 st 2 lb (115 kg)

Rugby union career
- Position: Tighthead Prop
Senior career
Years	Team	Apps	(Points)
1993–1997	Bath Rugby		
1997–1998	Richmond	42	(0)
2003–2004	Cardiff Blues		
1999–2003, 2004–2012	Bristol	156	(40)
- Correct as of 10 Sep 2007
International career
Years	Team	Apps	(Points)
2007	England	1	(0)
- Correct as of 10 Sep 2007

Darren Crompton (born 12 September 1972) is a retired professional rugby union player. He played for Richmond, Bath, Cardiff Blues, Bristol, Weston Super Mare and has also represented England at many levels. He is currently coach at Weston Super Mare.

== Professional career ==
Crompton began his professional career with Bath in 1993, before moving to Bristol in 1999 after a spell at Richmond. He played for Bristol for four years, making up his first stint at the club, before moving to the Cardiff Blues for the 2003-04 Celtic League. He returned for his second spell at Bristol on a two-year contract along with another former Bristol and Bath player, Dave Hilton, helping them win the National Division One title in 2005. Newly promoted to the Premiership, they were joined in the front row at the start of the 2005-06 Guinness Premiership by yet another former Bristol and Bath man, Mark Regan. With Hilton playing loosehead, Regan at hooker, and Crompton at tighthead, their combined age was over 100. Because of this, no one expected the old but experienced front row team to have as much impact as they did, and they became known as 'Dad's Army'. Having helped keep Bristol in the Premiership in their first season, and after playing every game during the 2006-07 Guinness Premiership, which saw the team finish a surprising 3rd, he renewed his contract with Bristol Rugby in Spring 2006. And then went on to become the most capped player for Bristol ever.

== International career ==
He has played for England U16s', captained the U18's and the U21s, leading the U18 team in all five of their matches in 1991. He was selected for the England A tour of Australia and Fiji in 1995 debuting against South Australia. In 1998 he went on his first full England tour to the Southern Hemisphere, but returned home uncapped. He made no further appearance for England until 2007 when he was selected for the mid-year test series in South Africa. Many spaces were made available on this tour as no Bath, Leicester Tigers or Wasps were selected by Brian Ashton due to Heineken Cup and European Challenge Cup Final commitments. This meant that Crompton was selected for the tour at the age of 34, nine years after his first senior England tour, as a result of his form in the Premiership. Thus he was able to win his full England cap, when he took to the field during the first test against the Springboks in Bloemfontein as a replacement for Stuart Turner on 26 May 2007. Having already represented his country, Crompton was called up again to wear the rose this time for England Sevens, however he rejected the offer as he believed that sevens do not take scrums seriously.

Crompton now runs a successful building company by the name of DC Builders. He also works closely with his good friend and mentor Daniel Jenkins.
