= Ali Hepher =

English rugby union player

- Born: Alistair Hepher; 3 October 1974 (age 52) Ashington, England
- Height: 1.91 m (6 ft 3 in)
- Weight: 95 kg (14 st 13 lb; 209 lb)

Rugby union career
- Position: Fly-half
- Current team: Exeter Chiefs
Senior career
| Years | Team | Apps | (Points) |
| 1997–2002 | Northampton Saints | 50 | (285) |
Coaching career
- Years: Team
- 2009–: Exeter Chiefs (Head Coach)

Alistair "Ali" Hepher (born 3 October 1974) is a rugby union player and coach. He played at Fly-half for Northampton. Since retiring from playing he has worked as a coach at Bedford RFC, Northampton and Exeter Chiefs.

== Club career ==
Hepher was part of the Northampton team that won the 2000 Heineken Cup Final.

== International career ==
Hepher was called up to the senior England squad by Clive Woodward for the 2000 England rugby union tour of South Africa as a replacement for Alex King. However he was ultimately never capped at this level.
