= 1998–99 National League 2 North =

Rugby union competition in England

- Countries: England
- Champions: Preston Grasshoppers (1st title)
- Runners-up: Stourbridge (not promoted)
- Relegated: Winnington Park, Lichfield, Hinckley
- Matches played: 182

The 1998–99 National League 2 North was the twelfth full season of rugby union within the fourth tier (north) of the English league system. It is counterpart to National League 2 South, which covers the southern half of the country.

As with the previous season, the battle for the league was very competitive, with Preston Grasshoppers edging out Stourbridge by just 2 points to claim the title and only promotion spot to the 1999–00 National League 1. At the other end of the table Winnington Park, Lichfield, Hinckley were the three sides to be relegated, with newly promoted Hinckley being the most competitive of the three. Winnington Park would drop to North 1 while Lichfield and Hinckley fell to Midlands 1. The reason National League 2 North had so many relegation places compared to National League 2 South (3 to 1) was that both of the two teams relegated from the division above were based in the north of the country, requiring more places to accommodate for their arrival the following season.

== Structure ==
Each team played home and away matches against each of the other teams, playing a total of twenty-six matches each. The league champions were promoted to National League 1 while the bottom three sides dropped to either North 1 or Midlands depending on locality.

== Participating teams and locations ==
1998–99 National League 2 North teams in England

Team	Ground	Capacity	City/Area	Previous season
Aspatria	Bower Park	3,000 (300 seats)	Aspatria, Cumbria	9th
Hinckley	Leicester Road	2,000	Hinckley, Leicestershire	12th
Kendal	Mint Bridge	4,600 (600 seats)	Kendal, Cumbria	3rd
Lichfield	Cooke Fields	5,460 (460 seats)	Lichfield, Staffordshire	14th
New Brighton	Hartsfield	2,000	Moreton, Merseyside	Promoted from North 1 (1st)
Nuneaton	Liberty Way	3,800 (500 seats)	Nuneaton, Warwickshire	7th
Preston Grasshoppers	Lightfoot Green	2,250 (250 seats)	Preston, Lancashire	4th
Sandal	Milnthorpe Green		Sandal Magna, Wakefield, West Yorkshire	8th
Sedgley Park	Park Lane	3,000	Whitefield, Greater Manchester	5th
Sheffield	Abbeydale Park	3,300 (100 seats) (Note: Although a 1990 club estimate was 1,100 (100 seated and 1,000 standing) this is very conservative as Abbeydale Park would experience 3,000+ crowds several times in later history in what was a relatively unchanged ground.)	Dore, Sheffield, South Yorkshire	10th
Stourbridge	Stourton Park	3,500 (450 seats)	Stourbridge, West Midlands	6th
Walsall	Broadway	2,250 (250 seats)	Walsall, West Midlands	11th
Whitchurch	Edgeley Park		Whitchurch, Shropshire	Promoted from Midlands 1 (1st)
Winnington Park	Burrows Hill	5,000	Northwich, Cheshire	13th

== League table ==
1998–99 National League 2 North table
Pos	Team	Pld	W	D	L	PF	PA	PD	Pts	Qualification
1	Preston Grasshoppers (C)	26	23	0	3	822	341	+481	46	Promoted
2	Stourbridge	26	22	0	4	895	413	+482	44	
3	New Brighton	26	20	0	6	703	329	+374	40	
4	Kendal	26	18	0	8	635	347	+288	36	
5	Nuneaton	26	14	2	10	597	533	+64	30	
6	Sheffield	26	15	0	11	496	455	+41	30	
7	Sandal	26	13	0	13	697	611	+86	26	
8	Sedgley Park	26	12	1	13	710	553	+157	25	
9	Walsall	26	10	1	15	515	720	−205	21	
10	Aspatria	26	10	0	16	578	675	−97	20	
11	Whitchurch	26	9	1	16	450	599	−149	19	
12	Hinckley (R)	26	7	1	18	445	733	−288	15	Relegated
13	Lichfield (R)	26	3	0	23	371	950	−579	6	Relegated
14	Winnington Park (R)	26	3	0	23	310	965	−655	6	Relegated

Rules for classification: Points are awarded as follows: 2 pts for a win, 1 pt for a draw, 0 pts for a loss. If teams are level at any stage, difference between points for and against applies.
(C) Champions; (R) Relegated

== Sponsorship ==
National League 2 North is part of the Jewson National Leagues is sponsored by Jewson.

== See also ==
- 1998–99 Premiership 1
- 1998–99 Premiership 2
- 1998–99 National League 1
- 1998–99 National League 2 South
