= 1998–99 National League 2 South =

Rugby union competition in England

- Countries: England
- Champions: Bracknell (1st title)
- Runners-up: Esher (not promoted)
- Relegated: Havant
- Matches played: 182

The 1998–99 National League 2 South (sponsored by Jewson) was the twelfth full season of rugby union within the fourth tier (south) of the English league system. It is counterpart to National League 2 North, which covers the northern half of the country.

The title battle was very keenly contested by three clubs but in the end it was Bracknell who came out top, 1 point clear of runners up Esher and 3 clear of 3rd placed North Walsham, to claim their second successive promotion and a place in the 1999–00 National League 1. It was during this campaign that Bracknell set the (then) English league record of 53 consecutive wins at home. The battle for relegation was equally well contested with a number of teams fighting for survival. Despite battling hard Havant would finish in the bottom spot, dead level with 13th placed Cheltenham but with a worse for/against record. Havant would drop to London 1. The reason National League 2 South had only one relegation place compared to National League 2 North (who had 3) was that both of the two teams relegated from the division above were based in the north of the country, requiring more places to accommodate for their arrival the following season.

== Structure ==
Each team played home and away matches against each of the other teams, playing a total of twenty-six matches each. The league champions were promoted to National League 1 while the bottom side dropped to either London 1 or South West 1 depending on locality.

== Participating teams and locations ==
1998–99 National League 2 South teams in England

Team	Ground	Capacity	City/Area	Previous season
Barking	Goresbrook	1,000	Becontree, Dagenham, London	3rd
Bracknell	Lily Hill Park	1,000	Bracknell, Berkshire	Promoted from South West 1 (champions)
Bridgwater & Albion	Bath Road	5,000	Bridgwater, Somerset	8th
Cheltenham	Newlands Park		Southam, Cheltenham, Gloucestershire	5th
Clifton	Station Road	2,200 (200 seats)	Cribbs Causeway, Henbury, Bristol	11th
Esher	Molesey Road	3,500	Hersham, Surrey	4th
Havant	Hook's Lane	2,000 (200 seats)	Havant, Hampshire	12th (no relegation)
Metropolitan Police	Imber Court	3,500 (500 seats)	East Molesey, Surrey	14th (no relegation)
North Walsham	Norwich Road	1,200	Scottow, Norfolk	7th
Norwich	Beeston Hyrne		Norwich, Norfolk	Promoted from London 1 (champions)
Plymouth Albion	Beacon Park	1,950 (450 seats)	Plymouth, Devon	13th (no relegation)
Redruth	Recreation Ground	12,000	Redruth, Cornwall	9th
Tabard	Cobden Hill		Radlett, Hertfordshire	6th
Weston-super-Mare	Recreation Ground	3,000	Weston-super-Mare, Somerset	10th

== League table ==
1998–99 National League 2 South table
Pos	Team	Pld	W	D	L	PF	PA	PD	Pts	Qualification
1	Brackell (C)	26	23	1	2	631	317	+314	47	Promoted
2	Esher	26	23	0	3	864	308	+556	46	
3	North Walsham	26	22	0	4	630	306	+324	44	
4	Barking	26	19	1	6	644	327	+317	39	
5	Metropolitan Police	26	14	1	11	470	545	−75	29	
6	Norwich	26	11	0	15	383	429	−46	22	
7	Clifton	26	10	1	15	415	483	−68	21	
8	Tabard	26	9	1	16	461	501	−40	19	
9	Weston-super-Mare	26	9	1	16	417	588	−171	19	
10	Bridgwater & Albion	26	8	2	16	462	624	−162	18	
11	Redruth	26	8	1	17	503	657	−154	17	
12	Plymouth Albion	26	7	1	18	457	666	−209	15	
13	Cheltenham	26	7	0	19	335	608	−273	14	
14	Havant (R)	26	7	0	19	361	674	−313	14	Relegated

Rules for classification: Points are awarded as follows: 2 pts for a win, 1 pt for a draw, 0 pts for a loss. If teams are level at any stage, difference between points for and against applies.
(C) Champions; (R) Relegated

== Sponsorship ==
National League 2 South is part of the Jewson National Leagues is sponsored by Jewson.

== See also ==
- 1998–99 Premiership 1
- 1998–99 Premiership 2
- 1998–99 National League 1
- 1998–99 National League 2 North
