= Roy Winters =

England international rugby union player

Royston Winters
- Born: Royston Anthony Maria Winters; 13 December 1975 (age 50) Cuckfield, England
- Height: 6 ft 4 in (1.93 m)
- Weight: 17 st 11 lb (113 kg)
- University: Loughborough University

Rugby union career
- Position: Lock
Senior career
Years	Team	Apps	(Points)
- Loughborough Students
1995–2000	Bedford RFC		
2000–2005	Harlequins		
2005–13	Bristol	188	(15)
International career
Years	Team	Apps	(Points)
2007	England	2	(0)

Royston "Roy" Winters (born 13 December 1975) is a former English rugby union player. A lock, Winters last played in the Aviva Championship for Bristol. He began his career playing for Haywards Heath RFC before becoming professional.

Winters started his senior career in the backrow, before being turned into an international lock at Bristol. He had the unusual record of representing 3 different clubs (Bristol, Harlequins, and Bedford) over 100 times. He made his England A debut at 7, but was first called up to the senior England squad by Clive Woodward for the 2000 England rugby union tour of South Africa as a lock.

Winters had a good 2006–07 Guinness Premiership, coming second in the voting for the PRA Player of the Year and then followed up by being selected for the 2007 England rugby union tour of South Africa. He made his debut for England against South Africa in Bloemfontein on 26 May 2007. He was named captain of Bristol for the 2009–10 RFU Championship.
