= 1998–99 National League 1 =

Rugby union competition in England

- Countries: England
- Champions: Henley (1st title)
- Runners-up: Manchester (also promoted)
- Relegated: Morley, Liverpool St Helens
- Matches played: 182

The 1998–99 National League 1, sponsored by Jewson, was the twelfth full season of rugby union within the third tier of the English league system.

Henley finished the season as champions and along with runners up Manchester were promoted to Premiership Two. The relegated sides were Morley and Liverpool St Helens, both of whom would drop to National League 2 North.

== Structure ==
The league consisted of fourteen teams, playing each other on a home and away basis to make a total of twenty-six matches for each team. There were two promotion places with the top two teams promoted to the Premiership Two. Two teams were relegated to either National League 2 North or South, depending on geographical location.

== Participating teams and locations ==
1998–99 National League 1 teams in England

Team	Ground	Capacity	City/Area	Previous season
Birmingham & Solihull	Sharmans Cross	4,000	Solihull, West Midlands	Promoted from National 2 North (1st)
Camberley	Watchetts Recreation Ground		Camberley, Surrey	Promoted from National 2 South (1st)
Harrogate	Claro Road	4,500 (500 seats)	Harrogate, North Yorkshire	14th
Henley	Dry Leas	4,000	Henley-on-Thames, Oxfordshire	Promoted from National 2 South (2nd)
Liverpool St Helens	Moss Lane	4,370 (370 seats)	St Helens, Merseyside	11th
Lydney	Regentsholm	3,000 (340 seats)	Lydney, Gloucestershire	12th
Manchester	Grove Park	4,000	Cheadle Hulme, Stockport	Promoted from National 2 North (2nd)
Morley	Scatcherd Lane	6,000 (1,000 seats)	Morley, Leeds, West Yorkshire	13th
Newbury	Monks Lane	8,000	Newbury, Berkshire	7th
Nottingham	Ireland Avenue	4,990 (590 seats)	Nottingham, Nottinghamshire	6th
Otley	Cross Green	7,000 (852 seats)	Otley, Leeds, West Yorkshire	9th
Reading	Holme Park		Sonning, Berkshire	8th
Rosslyn Park	The Rock	4,630 (630 seats)	Roehampton, London	5th
Wharfedale	The Avenue	2,000	Threshfield, North Yorkshire	10th

== League table ==
1998–99 Jewson National Division One table
Pos	Team	Pld	W	D	L	PF	PA	PD	Pts	Qualification
1	Henley	26	22	1	3	642	299	+343	45	Promoted
2	Manchester	26	20	1	5	758	372	+386	41	Promoted
3	Rosslyn Park	26	17	1	8	588	371	+217	35	
4	Nottingham	26	16	0	10	590	467	+123	32	
5	Otley	26	15	1	10	508	416	+92	31	
6	Newbury	26	14	1	11	552	476	+76	29	
7	Wharfedale	26	13	1	12	477	421	+56	27	
8	Lydney	26	11	2	13	438	482	−44	24	
9	Camberley	26	10	1	15	529	661	−132	21	
10	Reading	26	10	0	16	468	635	−167	20	
11	Birmingham & Solihull	26	9	0	17	422	521	−99	18	
12	Harrogate	26	8	2	16	309	461	−152	18	
13	Morley	26	7	1	18	468	643	−175	15	Relegated
14	Liverpool St Helens	26	4	0	22	335	859	−524	8	Relegated

Rules for classification: Points are awarded as follows: 2 pts for a win, 1 pt for a draw, 0 pts for a loss. If teams are level at any stage, the following tiebreaker is applied: Difference between points for and against.

== See also ==
- 1998–99 Premiership 1
- 1998–99 Premiership 2
- 1998–99 National League 2 North
- 1998–99 National League 2 South
