= 1998–99 Premiership 1 =

Rugby union competition in England

1998-99 Premiership 1
- Countries: England
- Date: 5 September 1998 – 20 May 1999
- Champions: Leicester Tigers (3rd title)
- Runners-up: Northampton Saints
- Relegated: West Hartlepool
- Matches played: 182
- Attendance: 1,002,308 (average 5,507 per match)
- Highest attendance: 17,347 – Saracens v Leicester (11 October 1998)
- Lowest attendance: 850 – London Scottish v Gloucester (5 January 1999)
- Top point scorer: 331 – John Schuster (Harlequins)
- Top try scorer: 16 – Neil Back (Leicester)

The 1997–98 Premiership 1 was the twelfth season of the top tier of the English rugby union league system, currently known as Premiership Rugby, and the second to be sponsored by Allied Dunbar, having previous been sponsored by Courage Brewery. Newcastle Falcons were the defending champions and Bedford, London Scottish and West Hartlepool the promoted sides.

Leicester Tigers finished the season as champions for the third time (and first title since 1995), while West Hartlepool were relegated to as the bottom place side, dropping to the 1999–00 Premiership 2. 9th place Richmond and 12th London Scottish were placed into administration at the end of the campaign, merging with London Irish, and thus did not compete in the subsequent season.

== Structure ==
Following restructuring from the previous season, the league increased from twelve to fourteen teams, with each side playing one another twice, in a round robin system, home and away, to make a total of twenty-six matches for each team. The bottom side would be automatically relegated to Premiership 2.

== Participating teams ==
Locations of the 1998–99 Allied Dunbar Premiership One teams
1998-99 Allied Dunbar Premiership One teams in London

Team	Stadium	Capacity	City/Area	Previous season
Bath	Recreation Ground	8,500 (Note: Recreation Ground capacity up from 8,300 to 8,500 for the 1998–99 season with a capacity crowd achieved against Leicester Tigers on 3 April 1999.)	Bath, Somerset	3rd
Bedford	Goldington Road	6,500	Bedford, Bedfordshire	Promoted from Premiership 2 (1st)
Gloucester	Kingsholm	12,000	Gloucester, Gloucestershire	6th
Harlequins	The Stoop	9,000 (2,000 seats)	Twickenham, London	10th
Leicester Tigers	Welford Road	17,000	Leicester, Leicestershire	4th
London Irish	The Avenue	6,710 (Note: The Avenue capacity up to 6,710 for the 1998–99 season - London Irish registered a capacity crowd against Saracens on 1 May 1999.)	Sunbury-on-Thames, Surrey	11th
London Scottish	The Stoop (Note: For the 1998–99 season London Scottish would groundshare with Harlequins at The Stoop in Twickenham instead of playing at their traditional home the Athletic Ground in Richmond, London.)	9,000 (2,000 seats)	Twickenham, London	Promoted from Premiership 2 (3rd)
Newcastle Falcons	Kingston Park (Note: Newcastle played three home games at the 11,800 capacity Gateshead International Stadium, Gateshead on 2 September 1998, 27 September 1998 and 11 October 1998.)	6,900	Newcastle upon Tyne, Tyne and Wear	Champions
Northampton Saints	Franklin's Gardens	10,000 (Note: Franklin's Gardens capacity up from 9,000 to 10,000 for the 1998–99 season with a capacity crowd achieved versus Leicester Tigers on 13 March 1999.)	Northampton, Northamptonshire	8th
Richmond	Madejski Stadium	24,161 (Note: For the 1998–99 season Richmond would groundshare with football team Reading at Madejski Stadium instead of playing at their traditional home the Athletic Ground in Richmond, London.)	Reading, Berkshire	5th
Sale	Heywood Road	4,800	Sale, Greater Manchester	7th
Saracens	Vicarage Road (Note: Saracens would continue to groundshare with football team Watford at Vicarage Road.)	22,000	Watford, Hertfordshire	2nd
Wasps	Loftus Road (Note: Wasps would continue to groundshare with football team Queens Park Rangers at Loftus Road.)	18,439	Shepherd's Bush, London	9th
West Hartlepool	Victoria Park	7,856 (Note: For 1998–99 season West Hartlepool with groundshare with football team Hartlepool United having previous been based at Brierton Lane.)	Hartlepool, County Durham	Promoted from Premiership 2 (2nd)

== Table ==
Pos	Team	Pld	W	D	L	PF	PA	PD	TF	TA	Pts	Qualification
1	Leicester Tigers (C)	26	22	0	4	771	423	+348	86	34	44	Champion
2	Northampton Saints	26	19	0	7	754	556	+198	85	64	38	
3	Saracens	26	16	1	9	748	583	+165	82	59	33	
4	Harlequins	26	16	1	9	690	653	+37	64	75	33	
5	Wasps	26	15	1	10	717	506	+211	80	45	31	
6	Bath	26	15	0	11	698	574	+124	81	68	30	
7	London Irish	26	15	0	11	703	607	+96	75	65	30	
8	Newcastle Falcons	26	14	0	12	719	639	+80	85	69	28	
9	Richmond (A)	26	11	2	13	720	715	+5	96	75	24	Placed into administration
10	Gloucester	26	9	1	16	554	643	−89	58	67	19	
11	Sale Sharks	26	9	1	16	604	731	−127	76	80	19	
12	London Scottish (A)	26	8	0	18	491	734	−243	40	85	16	Placed into administration
13	Bedford Blues	26	6	0	20	541	840	−299	63	101	12	
14	West Hartlepool (R)	26	3	1	22	501	1007	−506	50	134	7	Relegated

(A) Placed into administration; (C) Champion; (R) Relegated

== Results ==
=== Week 1 ===
5 September 1998
14:15

Richmond	41–29	Newcastle Falcons

Madejski Stadium
Attendance: 9,530

5 September 1998
15:00

Bath Rugby	36–27	Wasps

Recreation Ground
Attendance: 8,000

5 September 1998
15:00

Gloucester	29–22	London Irish

Kingsholm
Attendance: 5,267

5 September 1998
15:00

Leicester Tigers	49–15	NEC Harlequins

Welford Road
Attendance: 13,130

5 September 1998
15:00

London Scottish	25–20	Sale Sharks

Twickenham Stoop
Attendance: 1,300

6 September 1998
15:00

Saracens	34–7	Northampton Saints

Vicarage Road
Attendance: 8,243

=== Week 2 ===
12 September 1998
14:15

Newcastle Falcons	19–17	Bath Rugby

Gateshead International Stadium
Attendance: 3,000

12 September 1998
15:00

London Scottish	3–38	Leicester Tigers

Twickenham Stoop
Attendance: 2,138

12 September 1998
15:00

Northampton Saints	25–6	NEC Harlequins

Franklin’s Gardens
Attendance: 5,870

12 September 1998
15:00

Richmond	22–25	Gloucester

Madejski Stadium
Attendance: 7,054

12 September 1998
15:00

Sale Sharks	39–21	Bedford Blues

Heywood Road
Attendance: 2,100

13 September 1998
15:00

West Hartlepool	20–44	London Irish

Victoria Park
Attendance: 2,059

=== Week 3 ===
19 September 1998
14:15

Leicester Tigers	35–25	Northampton Saints

Welford Road
Attendance: 13,292

19 September 1998
15:00

Bath Rugby	36–14	Richmond

Recreation Ground
Attendance: 7,600

19 September 1998
15:00

Bedford Blues	24–16	London Scottish

Goldington Road
Attendance: 2,347

19 September 1998
15:00

London Irish	24–36	Wasps

The Avenue
Attendance: 3,800

20 September 1998
15:00

Gloucester	36–3	West Hartlepool

Kingsholm
Attendance: 5,576

20 September 1998
15:00

Saracens	43–26	Sale Sharks

Vicarage Road
Attendance: 5,597

=== Week 4 ===
26 September 1998
14:15

Bedford Blues	23–32	Leicester Tigers

Goldington Road
Attendance: 4,165

26 September 1998
15:00

Bath Rugby	21–16	Gloucester

Recreation Ground
Attendance: 8,200

26 September 1998
15:00

London Scottish	20–58	Saracens

Twickenham Stoop
Attendance: 2,412

26 September 1998
15:00

Sale Sharks	44–34	NEC Harlequins

Heywood Road
Attendance: 3,200

27 September 1998
15:00

Wasps	71–14	West Hartlepool

Loftus Road
Attendance: 2,797

27 September 1998
15:00

Newcastle Falcons	21–23	London Irish

Gateshead International Stadium
Attendance: 4,184

=== Week 5 ===
3 October 1998
14:15

Gloucester	12–13	Wasps

Kingsholm
Attendance: 5,821

3 October 1998
15:00

Bath Rugby	57–19	Bedford Blues

Recreation Ground
Attendance: 6,000

3 October 1998
15:00

London Irish	29–33	Richmond

The Avenue
Attendance: 3,900

3 October 1998
15:00

NEC Harlequins	22–20	London Scottish

Twickenham Stoop
Attendance: 3,609

3 October 1998
15:00

Northampton Saints	37–17	Sale Sharks

Franklin’s Gardens
Attendance: 6,464

4 October 1998
15:00

West Hartlepool	19–24	Newcastle Falcons

Victoria Park
Attendance: 2,702

=== Week 6 ===
10 October 1998
15:00

Bath Rugby	23–20	London Irish

Recreation Ground
Attendance: 7,000

10 October 1998
15:00

Bedford Blues	35–33	NEC Harlequins

Goldington Road
Attendance: 3,521

10 October 1998
15:00

Richmond	41–23	West Hartlepool

Madejski Stadium
Attendance: 4,357

10 October 1998
18:00

London Scottish	22–33	Northampton Saints

Twickenham Stoop
Attendance: 1,900

11 October 1998
15:00

Newcastle Falcons	27–19	Wasps

Gateshead International Stadium
Attendance: 4,284

11 October 1998
15:00

Saracens	22–10	Leicester Tigers

Vicarage Road
Attendance: 17,347

=== Week 7 ===
17 October 1998
14:15

NEC Harlequins	41–28	Saracens

Twickenham Stoop
Attendance: 6,396

17 October 1998
15:00

Gloucester	41–32	Newcastle Falcons

Kingsholm
Attendance: 6,915

17 October 1998
15:00

Leicester Tigers	31–15	Sale Sharks

Welford Road
Attendance: 9,861

17 October 1998
15:00

Northampton Saints	34–29	Bedford Blues

Franklin’s Gardens
Attendance: 6,739

17 October 1998
15:00

West Hartlepool	20–50	Bath Rugby

Victoria Park
Attendance: 1,743

18 October 1998
15:00

London Wasps	22–27	Richmond

Loftus Road
Attendance: 6,778

=== Week 7 ===
20 October 1998
19:30

London Irish	24–23	Leicester Tigers

The Avenue
Attendance: 2,950

20 October 1998
19:30

NEC Harlequins	39–7	Gloucester

Twickenham Stoop
Attendance: 4,174

20 October 1998
19:30

West Hartlepool	3–52	Saracens

Victoria Park
Attendance: 2,000

21 October 1998
19:45

Wasps	35–19	Bedford Blues

Loftus Road
Attendance: 3,216

24 October 1998
14:15

Leicester Tigers	27–0	Richmond

Welford Road
Attendance: 8,443

24 October 1998
15:00

Bath Rugby	27–3	Sale Sharks

Recreation Ground
Attendance: 6,800

24 October 1998
15:00

Bedford Blues	22–29	Newcastle Falcons

Goldington Road
Attendance: 3,902

24 October 1998
15:00

London Irish	10–26	Northampton Saints

The Avenue
Attendance: 2,560

24 October 1998
15:00

NEC Harlequins	25–10	West Hartlepool

Twickenham Stoop
Attendance: 2,476

25 October 1998
15:00

Gloucester	29–16	London Scottish

Kingsholm
Attendance: 6,000

25 October 1998
15:00

Saracens	17–31	London Wasps

Vicarage Road
Attendance: 11,261

=== Week 8 ===
28 October 1998
19:45

Sale Sharks	10–39	Richmond

Heywood Road
Attendance: 2,500

31 October 1998
14:15

Newcastle Falcons	43–12	Saracens

Kingston Park
Attendance: 4,833

31 October 1998
15:00

London Scottish	13–11	Bath Rugby

Twickenham Stoop
Attendance: 2,267

31 October 1998
15:00

Northampton Saints	22–8	Gloucester

Franklin’s Gardens
Attendance: 7,284

1 November 1998
15:00

Wasps	21–22	NEC Harlequins

Loftus Road
Attendance: 6,627

1 November 1998
15:00

Richmond	38–32	Bedford Blues

Madejski Stadium
Attendance: 6,541

1 November 1998
15:00

West Hartlepool	15–45	Leicester Tigers

Victoria Park
Attendance: 1,846

=== Week 9 ===
7 November 1998
14:15

Leicester Tigers	36–13	Bath Rugby

Welford Road
Attendance: 15,873

7 November 1998
15:00

Gloucester	31–21	Bedford Blues

Kingsholm
Attendance: 5,147

7 November 1998
15:00

London Irish	25–31	Sale Sharks

The Avenue
Attendance: 2,300

7 November 1998
15:00

NEC Harlequins	25–20	Newcastle Falcons

Twickenham Stoop
Attendance: 5,974

7 November 1998
15:00

Northampton Saints	26–21	Wasps

Franklin’s Gardens
Attendance: 6,722

8 November 1998
15:00

Saracens	33–17	Richmond

Vicarage Road
Attendance: 9,217

=== Week 10 ===
13 November 1998
19:30

Sale Sharks	42–26	West Hartlepool

Heywood Road
Attendance: 2,338

14 November 1998
15:00

London Scottish	17–23	London Irish

Twickenham Stoop
Attendance: 3,000

15 November 1998
15:00

Bedford Blues	20–25	Saracens

Goldington Road
Attendance: 5,125

15 November 1998
15:00

Wasps	45–17	Leicester Tigers

Loftus Road
Attendance: 6,027

15 November 1998
15:00

Newcastle Falcons	45–35	Northampton Saints

Kingston Park
Attendance: 4,293

=== Week 11 ===
21 November 1998
14:15

Northampton Saints	44–27	Richmond

Franklin’s Gardens
Attendance: 5,978

21 November 1998
15:00

Gloucester	28–27	Saracens

Kingsholm
Attendance: 6,627

21 November 1998
15:00

London Irish	30–19	Bedford Blues

The Avenue
Attendance: 2,200

21 November 1998
15:00

NEC Harlequins	43–31	Bath Rugby

Twickenham Stoop
Attendance: 6,875

22 November 1998
15:00

Wasps	32–19	Sale Sharks

Loftus Road
Attendance: 3,865

22 November 1998
15:00

West Hartlepool	7–37	London Scottish

Victoria Park
Attendance: 1,837

=== Week 12 ===
12 December 1998
14:00

Sale Sharks	26–10	Gloucester

Heywood Road
Attendance: 3,200

12 December 1998
15:00

Bath Rugby	9–15	Northampton Saints

Recreation Ground
Attendance: 8,200

12 December 1998
15:00

Bedford Blues	10–23	West Hartlepool

Goldington Road
Attendance: 2,398

12 December 1998
15:00

Leicester Tigers	31–18	Newcastle Falcons

Welford Road
Attendance: 11,226

12 December 1998
15:00

London Scottish	9–17	Wasps

Twickenham Stoop
Attendance: 2,159

13 December 1998
15:00

Saracens	40–26	London Irish

Vicarage Road
Attendance: 10,373

=== Week 13 ===
19 December 1998
14:00

Bath Rugby	11–19	Saracens

Recreation Ground
Attendance: 8,200

19 December 1998
15:00

Gloucester	18–23	Leicester Tigers

Kingsholm
Attendance: 7,222

19 December 1998
15:00

London Irish	20–16	NEC Harlequins

The Avenue
Attendance: 5,460

19 December 1998
18:00

London Scottish	16–28	Richmond

Twickenham Stoop
Attendance: 1,540

20 December 1998
15:00

Newcastle Falcons	30–15	Sale Sharks

Kingston Park
Attendance: 3,020

20 December 1998
15:00

West Hartlepool	9–33	Northampton Saints

Victoria Park
Attendance: 1,613

=== Week 14 ===
26 December 1998
15:00

Leicester Tigers	26–0	Bedford Blues

Welford Road
Attendance: 10,689

26 December 1998
15:00

Richmond	13–25	London Irish

Madejski Stadium
Attendance: 9,621

27 December 1998
15:00

Wasps	23–9	Gloucester

Loftus Road
Attendance: 5,362

27 December 1998
15:00

NEC Harlequins	17–15	Sale Sharks

Twickenham Stoop
Attendance: 5,100

27 December 1998
15:00

Newcastle Falcons	29–13	West Hartlepool

Kingston Park
Attendance: 3,403

27 December 1998
15:15

Saracens	7–24	London Scottish

Vicarage Road
Attendance: 10,257

=== Week 15 ===
2 January 1999
14:00

Gloucester	23–7	Bath Rugby

Kingsholm
Attendance: 10,109

2 January 1999
15:00

London Irish	16–14	Newcastle Falcons

The Avenue
Attendance: 4,250

2 January 1999
15:00

London Scottish	24–35	NEC Harlequins

Twickenham Stoop
Attendance: 4,600

2 January 1999
15:00

Sale Sharks	24–39	Northampton Saints

Heywood Road
Attendance: 4,300

3 January 1999
15:00

Saracens	44–13	Bedford Blues

Vicarage Road
Attendance: 6,593

3 January 1999
15:00

West Hartlepool	21–17	Wasps

Victoria Park
Attendance: 2,133

=== Week 16 ===
5 January 1999
19:30

London Scottish	24–13	Gloucester

Twickenham Stoop
Attendance: 850

5 January 1999
19:30

Newcastle Falcons	34–23	Bedford Blues

Kingston Park
Attendance: 2,070

5 January 1999
19:30

Northampton Saints	8–32	London Irish

Franklin’s Gardens
Attendance: 7,450

5 January 1999
19:30

Sale Sharks	30–32	Bath Rugby

Heywood Road
Attendance: 3,500

6 January 1999
19:30

Wasps	15–15	Saracens

Loftus Road
Attendance: 8,534

=== Week 17 ===
16 January 1999
14:30

Leicester Tigers	24–12	London Scottish

Welford Road
Attendance: 9,985

16 January 1999
15:00

Bath Rugby	16–11	Newcastle Falcons

Recreation Ground
Attendance: 8,200

16 January 1999
15:00

London Irish	43–21	West Hartlepool

The Avenue
Attendance: 2,129

16 January 1999
15:00

NEC Harlequins	17–24	Northampton Saints

Twickenham Stoop
Attendance: 8,500

16 January 1999
16:15

Gloucester	24–24	Richmond

Kingsholm
Attendance: 4,811

=== Week 18 ===
23 January 1999
14:00

NEC Harlequins	17–22	London Irish

Twickenham Stoop
Attendance: 7,824

23 January 1999
14:30

Leicester Tigers	23–16	Gloucester

Welford Road
Attendance: 11,394

23 January 1999
15:00

Bedford Blues	17–30	Bath Rugby

Goldington Road
Attendance: 3,673

23 January 1999
15:00

Northampton Saints	19–14	West Hartlepool

Franklin’s Gardens
Attendance: 6,023

23 January 1999
15:00

Richmond	40–22	London Scottish

Madejski Stadium
Attendance: 3,445

23 January 1999
15:00

Sale Sharks	20–28	Newcastle Falcons

Heywood Road
Attendance: 3,500

26 January 1999
20:00

Richmond	11–23	Leicester Tigers

Madejski Stadium
Attendance: 7,981

=== Week 19 ===
6 February 1999
15:00

NEC Harlequins	9–34	Leicester Tigers

Twickenham Stoop
Attendance: 6,212

6 February 1999
15:00

Northampton Saints	18–21	Saracens

Franklin’s Gardens
Attendance: 8,253

6 February 1999
15:00

Sale Sharks	7–23	London Scottish

Heywood Road
Attendance: 2,200

7 February 1999
14:30

Wasps	35–0	Bath Rugby

Loftus Road
Attendance: 9,526

7 February 1999
15:00

London Irish	42–20	Gloucester

The Avenue
Attendance: 5,020

=== Week 20 ===
13 February 1999
14:00

Leicester Tigers	31–10	London Irish

Welford Road
Attendance: 15,132

13 February 1999
15:00

Bedford Blues	25–23	Wasps

Goldington Road
Attendance: 3,440

13 February 1999
15:00

Gloucester	20–31	NEC Harlequins

Kingsholm
Attendance: 6,046

13 February 1999
15:00

London Scottish	27–17	Newcastle Falcons

Twickenham Stoop
Attendance: 2,101

14 February 1999
15:00

Richmond	29–24	Sale Sharks

Madejski Stadium
Attendance: 4,695

14 February 1999
15:00

Saracens	48–27	West Hartlepool

Vicarage Road
Attendance: 5,872

=== Week 21 ===
27 February 1999
15:00

Bedford Blues	7–18	Sale Sharks

Goldington Road
Attendance: 3,139

=== Week 22 ===
13 March 1999
15:00

London Scottish	15–24	Bedford Blues

Twickenham Stoop
Attendance: 1,273

13 March 1999
15:00

Richmond	23–30	Bath Rugby

Madejski Stadium
Attendance: 10,096

13 March 1999
15:00

Sale Sharks	32–24	Saracens

Heywood Road
Attendance: 3,570

13 March 1999
16:00

Northampton Saints	15–22	Leicester Tigers

Franklin’s Gardens
Attendance: 10,000

14 March 1999
15:00

Wasps	38–27	London Irish

Loftus Road
Attendance: 6,048

14 March 1999
15:00

West Hartlepool	33–32	Gloucester

Victoria Park
Attendance: 1,300

=== Week 23 ===
27 March 1999
15:00

Bedford Blues	19–15	Gloucester

Goldington Road
Attendance: 2,417

27 March 1999
15:00

Leicester Tigers	16–6	Wasps

Welford Road
Attendance: 12,449

27 March 1999
15:00

London Irish	35–12	London Scottish

The Avenue
Attendance: 4,400

27 March 1999
15:00

NEC Harlequins	32–32	Richmond

Twickenham Stoop
Attendance: 5,600

27 March 1999
15:00

Northampton Saints	57–16	Newcastle Falcons

Franklin’s Gardens
Attendance: 6,540

28 March 1999
15:00

Saracens	14–33	Bath Rugby

Vicarage Road
Attendance: 14,219

28 March 1999
15:00

West Hartlepool	33–33	Sale Sharks

Victoria Park
Attendance: 1,531

=== Week 24 ===
31 March 1999
19:30

Newcastle Falcons	43–20	London Scottish

Kingston Park
Attendance: 2,506

3 April 1999
15:00

Bath Rugby	24–16	Leicester Tigers

Recreation Ground
Attendance: 8,500

3 April 1999
15:00

Sale Sharks	30–27	London Irish

Heywood Road
Attendance: 3,515

=== Week 25 ===
13 April 1999
19:45

London Wasps	15–24	Northampton Saints

Loftus Road
Attendance: 3,126

17 April 1999
14:15

Leicester Tigers	25–18	Saracens

Welford Road
Attendance: 13,823

17 April 1999
15:00

London Irish	47–22	Bath Rugby

The Avenue
Attendance: 6,600

17 April 1999
15:00

NEC Harlequins	29–16	Bedford Blues

Twickenham Stoop
Attendance: 3,828

17 April 1999
15:00

Northampton Saints	44–13	London Scottish

Franklin’s Gardens
Attendance: 7,108

18 April 1999
15:00

Wasps	34–33	Newcastle Falcons

Loftus Road
Attendance: 5,104

18 April 1999
15:00

West Hartlepool	35–36	Richmond

Victoria Park
Attendance: 1,206

=== Week 26 ===
21 April 1999
19:30

Newcastle Falcons	47–14	Richmond

Kingston Park
Attendance: 2,728

21 April 1999
19:30

West Hartlepool	37–47	NEC Harlequins

Victoria Park
Attendance: 1,107

24 April 1999
15:00

Bath Rugby	56–24	West Hartlepool

Recreation Ground
Attendance: 6,500

24 April 1999
15:00

Bedford Blues	31–42	Northampton Saints

Goldington Road
Attendance: 4,689

24 April 1999
15:00

Sale Sharks	17–41	Leicester Tigers

Heywood Road
Attendance: 4,800

25 April 1999
15:00

Newcastle Falcons	39–15	Gloucester

Kingston Park
Attendance: 3,748

25 April 1999
15:00

Richmond	5–29	Wasps

Madejski Stadium
Attendance: 3,594

25 April 1999
15:00

Saracens	30–38	NEC Harlequins

Vicarage Road
Attendance: 8,719

=== Week 27 ===
1 May 1999
15:00

Gloucester	24–34	Sale Sharks

Kingsholm
Attendance: 4,528

1 May 1999
15:00

London Irish	21–26	Saracens

The Avenue
Attendance: 6,710

1 May 1999
15:00

Northampton Saints	40–17	Bath Rugby

Franklin’s Gardens
Attendance: 8,843

2 May 1999
15:00

Wasps	45–22	London Scottish

Loftus Road
Attendance: 4,419

2 May 1999
15:00

Newcastle Falcons	12–21	Leicester Tigers

Kingston Park
Attendance: 5,207

- Leicester Tigers are champions.

2 May 1999
15:00

West Hartlepool	0–39	Bedford Blues

Victoria Park
Attendance: 1,400

3 May 1999
15:00

Richmond	23–30	NEC Harlequins

Madejski Stadium
Attendance: 3,300

=== Week 28 ===
7 May 1999
19:45

Saracens	26–10	Gloucester

Vicarage Road
Attendance: 5,261

8 May 1999
15:00

Bath Rugby	13–17	NEC Harlequins

Recreation Ground
Attendance: 8,200

8 May 1999
15:00

Bedford Blues	21–36	London Irish

Goldington Road
Attendance: 3,572

8 May 1999
15:00

London Scottish	26–14	West Hartlepool

Twickenham Stoop
Attendance: 1,459

8 May 1999
15:00

Richmond	19–31	Northampton Saints

Madejski Stadium
Attendance: 3,500

8 May 1999
15:00

Sale Sharks	13–27	Wasps

Heywood Road
Attendance: 4,495

=== Week 29 ===
11 May 1999
19:30

Newcastle Falcons	33–23	NEC Harlequins

Kingston Park
Attendance: 4,133

12 May 1999
20:00

Richmond	18–25	Saracens

Madejski Stadium
Attendance: 2,613

15 May 1999
17:00

Bath Rugby	76–13	London Scottish

Recreation Ground
Attendance: 4,800

16 May 1999
15:00

Bedford Blues	12–106	Richmond

Goldington Road
Attendance: 1,308

16 May 1999
15:00

Gloucester	43–31	Northampton Saints

Kingsholm
Attendance: 4,935

16 May 1999
15:00

Leicester Tigers	72–37	West Hartlepool

Welford Road
Attendance: 12,958

=== Week 30 ===
19 May 1999
19:30

NEC Harlequins	27–20	Wasps

Twickenham Stoop
Attendance: 5,232

20 May 1999
19:45

Saracens	40–26	Newcastle Falcons

Vicarage Road
Attendance: 6,982

== Attendances ==
Club	Home Games	Total	Average	Highest	Lowest	% Capacity
Bath	13	96,200	7,400	8,500	4,800	87%
Bedford	13	43,696	3,361	5,125	1,308	52%
Gloucester	13	79,004	6,077	10,109	4,528	51%
Harlequins	13	71,800	5,523	8,500	2,476	61%
Leicester Tigers	13	158,255	12,173	15,873	8,443	76%
London Irish	13	52,279	4,021	6,710	2,129	60%
London Scottish	13	26,999	2,077	4,600	850	23%
Newcastle Falcons	13	47,409	3,647	5,207	2,070	48%
Northampton Saints	13	93,274	7,175	10,000	5,870	72%
Richmond	13	76,327	5,871	10,096	2,613	24%
Sale	13	43,218	3,324	4,800	2,100	69%
Saracens	13	119,941	9,226	17,347	5,261	42%
Wasps	13	71,429	5,495	9,526	2,797	30%
West Hartlepool	13	22,477	1,729	2,702	1,107	22%

== Leading scorers ==
Note: Flags to the left of player names indicate national team as has been defined under World Rugby eligibility rules, or primary nationality for players who did not yet earn international senior caps. Players may hold one or more non-WR nationalities.

=== Most points ===
Rank	Player	Club	Points
1	(New Zealand) John Schuster	Harlequins	331
2	(South Africa) Gavin Johnson	Saracens	318
3	(England) Jonny Wilkinson	Newcastle Falcons	306
4	(England) Mike Catt	Bath	294
5	(Scotland) Kenny Logan	Wasps	263
6	(New Zealand) / (Wales) Shane Howarth	Sale	246
7	(New Zealand) Steven Vile	West Hartlepool	240
8	(Ireland) Niall Woods	London Irish	215
9	(Samoa) Earl Va'a	Richmond	205
10	(South Africa) Joel Stransky	Leicester Tigers	202

=== Most tries ===
Rank	Player	Club	Tries
1	(England) Neil Back	Leicester Tigers	16
2	(England) Jeremy Guscott	Bath	14
2	(Samoa) Pat Lam	Northampton Saints	14
4	(England) Iain Balshaw	Bath	13
5	(Scotland) Gary Armstrong	Newcastle Falcons	12
5	(New Zealand) Brendon Daniel	Saracens	12
5	(England) Steve Hanley	Sale	12
5	(Samoa) Va'aiga Tuigamala	Newcastle Falcons	12
5	(England) Rory Underwood	Bedford	12
5	(Ireland) Niall Woods	London Irish	12

== See also ==
- 1998–99 Premiership 2
- 1998–99 National League 1
- 1998–99 National League 2 North
- 1998–99 National League 2 South
