= Tony Windo =

English rugby union player

- Born: Tony Windo; 30 April 1969 (age 57) Gloucester, England
- Height: 1.8 m (5 ft 11 in)
- Weight: 120 kg (260 lb; 18 st 13 lb)

Rugby union career
- Position: Prop
Senior career
Years	Team	Apps	(Points)
1988–1999	Gloucester	218	(30)
1999–2008	Worcester Warriors	222	(160)
International career
Years	Team	Apps	(Points)
- England U21
–	England A		
Coaching career
- Years: Team
- 2008–2011: Worcester Warriors
- 2011–: Bromsgrove School
- 2010: Stourbridge
- 2012–2014: Gloucester

Tony Windo (born 30 April 1969 in Gloucester, England) is an English former professional rugby union footballer and current coach. He started his playing career at Gloucester before moving to Worcester Warriors in 1999, staying there until his retirement in 2008. Windo was called up to the 1998 England rugby union tour of Australasia and South Africa which became known later as the 'Tour of Hell', however he was ultimately not capped at that level.

Since retiring from playing, he has held coaching positions at several clubs and schools including Worcester Warriors, Gloucester, Stourbridge and Bromsgrove School.
