= Dominic Chapman =

England international rugby union footballer

Dominic Chapman (born 7 March 1976) is an English former rugby union footballer who played as a back three player. He won his only England cap against Australia during the 1998 "Tour of Hell". He played club rugby for Richmond FC.
