= Ben Sturnham =

England international rugby union player

Ben Sturnham (born 6 March 1974 (age 52)) is a former English rugby union player. He played for Saracens (1993–98 as U19, on contract 1997–98), Bath (1998–2000) and Bristol Shoguns (2000–2002). In 2002 his playing career was ended by a knee injury. He won three England caps on their 1998 tour of Australasia and South Africa.
