= Tom Beim =

English rugby union player

- Born: Thomas Beim; 11 December 1975 (age 50) Frimley, England
- Height: 5.4 ft (1.6 m)
- Weight: 11 st (70 kg)
- School: Whitefriars & Cheltenham College

Rugby union career
- Position: Wing
- Current team: retired
Amateur team(s)
Years	Team	Apps	(Points)
- Hamiltons (south africa)
- Correct as of 4 July 2014
Senior career
Years	Team	Apps	(Points)
1995–96	Gloucester Rugby	2	(5)
1996–99	Sale Sharks	61	(205)
1999–03	Gloucester Rugby	77	(120)
2003-	Viadana		
- Correct as of 4 July 2014
International career
Years	Team	Apps	(Points)
1998	England	2	(5)
- Correct as of 4 July 2014

Tom Beim (born 11 December 1975 in Frimley, England) is a former professional rugby union footballer, who played on the wing for Sale, Gloucester, Viadana, Pertemps Bees, the Barbarians and England. He is now a professional polo player for Lodge Services polo team backed by Stuart Lodge.

== Club Rugby ==
Beim was a prolific try scorer in the Premiership with Gloucester and Sale before moving to Italian side Viadana. Beim held the record at the time for the number of tries scored in a Heineken Cup game, touching down five times against Italian club Roma before finally losing it to Bordeaux Bègles winger Damian Penaud during the 2024–25 season. During his two seasons at Viadana he scored 31 tries. After a succession of injuries, Beim retired from professional rugby and has carved out a successful international polo career ever since. Whilst at Gloucester he started in the 2002 Zurich Championship Final (the year before victory in the play-offs constituted the new format for winning the English title) in which Gloucester defeated Bristol Rugby.

== International Rugby ==
Beim made two appearances for England during the 1998 summer tour of New Zealand and featured in the England squad again in 2002 when he was called in as a replacement during the tour match of Argentina. He later toured there playing for the England A side on a number of occasions. He also appeared for the Barbarians.
