= Darren Molloy =

English rugby union player

Darren Nigel Molloy born 31 August 1972 (age 53) in London, England is a former rugby union player. He played as a prop for Wasps and Gloucester in the English Premiership and Leinster in the Celtic League. Molloy also played for team 'England'.

Whilst at Wasps he helped them win the Anglo-Welsh Cup in 1999 and 2000.

== Coaching career ==
Molloy served as the coach of Folkestone Ruby Football Club for four years between 2010 and 2014. In 2022, Molloy joined Westcombe Park Rugby Football Club as their forwards and defence coach.
