= Paul Volley =

English rugby union player

- Born: Paul William Volley; 2 November 1971 (age 55) Beckenham, England
- Height: 6 ft 1 in (1.85 m)
- Weight: 16 st 8 lb (105 kg)
- Notable relative: Stephen Volley

Rugby union career
- Position: Flanker
Youth career
- Chinnor
Senior career
Years	Team	Apps	(Points)
1988–04	London Wasps	177	(165)
2004–06	Castres		
2006–2008	Harlequins	23	(0)
2008–2010	London Scottish F.C.		

Paul William Volley (born 2 November 1971 in Beckenham, Kent) is an English former rugby union player. As an open-side flanker, he played for London Wasps for 16 years. He joined as a 16-year-old from Chinnor. Volley was first called up to the senior England squad by Clive Woodward for the 2000 England rugby union tour of South Africa, and then again for the 2003 England rugby union tour of the Southern Hemisphere. However he was ultimately never capped at this level. He was also selected for England A on numerous occasions. He won Domestic and European competitions with London Wasps. This included helping them win the Anglo-Welsh Cup in 1999 and 2000; he was a replacement in the 1999 final but started in 2000. He also played in the 2002–03 Premiership Final and the 2003–04 Premiership Final, both of which were won by Wasps. After winning both the Zurich Premiership and Heineken Cup with Wasps in 2004, he headed across the Channel to play for Castres Olympique in France. He then returned to play for and captain Wasps' London rivals, Harlequins in 2006. In 2008 he signed a 2-year deal to play for RFU Championship side London Scottish.

After retiring from professional rugby, Volley began a new career in financial services. He resides in New Malden with his wife Joanne and children Edward and Lydia.
