= Scott Benton (rugby union) =

England international rugby union player

- Born: 8 September 1974 (age 52) Bradford, England
- Height: 5.9 ft (1.8 m)
- Weight: 13.2 st (84 kg)
- Occupation: Teacher

Rugby union career
- Position: Scrum-half
- Current team: retired
Amateur team(s)
Years	Team	Apps	(Points)
- Morley
- Correct as of 5 July 2014
Senior career
Years	Team	Apps	(Points)
	Gloucester Rugby	63	(50)
	Leeds	77	(170)
2004-2006	Sale Sharks	8	(15)
- Correct as of 5 July 2014
Provincial / State sides
Years	Team	Apps	(Points)
- Otago
- Correct as of 5 July 2014
International career
Years	Team	Apps	(Points)
- England U21
- England 'A'
1998	England	1	(0)
- Correct as of 5 July 2014

Scott Benton (born 8 September 1974) is an English former rugby union footballer. A scrum-half, Benton won his solitary cap on the 1998 Tour of Hell. He played club Rugby for Gloucester, Leeds, and Sale. Now he is a rugby coach and director at Rodillian school, bbg academy.
