= Spencer Brown (rugby union, born 1973) =

English rugby union player

- Born: Spencer Brown; 11 July 1973 (age 53) Eton, Berkshire, England
- Height: 5 ft 11 in (180 cm)
- Weight: 14 st 0 lb (196 lb; 89 kg)
- University: PhD, University of Warwick; MSc, University of Edinburgh; BSc, University of Northampton
- Occupation: Physical Performance Coach

Rugby union career
- Position: Wing
Senior career
Years	Team	Apps	(Points)
1992–1999	Richmond		
1999–2001	Bristol RFC		
2002–2005	Bedford Blues		
International career
Years	Team	Apps	(Points)
1998	England	3	(0)
–	England Sevens		
–	Combined Services		
–	Royal Navy		

Spencer Brown (born 11 July 1973, Eton, England) is a former professional and International rugby union player. He played on the wing and at fullback.

Spencer appeared on the ITV programme Long Lost Family in August 2018, and again in August 2019 for ITVs follow-up series Long Lost Family: What Happened Next.

== Biography ==
Spencer Brown was a professional rugby player as a winger/fullback for nine years, with six of these being in the English premiership for Richmond RFC and Bristol RFC. Brown has also represented the Royal Navy and Combined Services rugby teams. His professional career ended at Bedford Blues where he was later to become the strength and conditioning coach. He joined Richmond RFC in 1992 when they were in the third tier of English rugby. His professional debut for Richmond RFC came on 7 September 1997 in the Challenge Cup in the 34-18 defeat to Colomiers. He then moved to Bristol RFC after the 1998-1999 season - Bristol rugby fans first saw his defensive qualities when he made a bone crunching try saving tackle on Tana Umaga whilst playing against New Zealand for an England XV team at Ashton Gate. Brown was a member of the England Elite squad between 1998 and 2001 during which time he represented England at the World Sevens in Paris, England 'A' during three seasons, and won two full England caps against Australia and South Africa on the 1998 tour to the Southern Hemisphere.

He joined the Royal Marines as a Musician in 1990 and served for 13 years. During this time he was based at RAF Northolt, Deal, London, Bristol and Portsmouth. He has a 1st class Honours Degree in Sport & Exercise Science from The University of Northampton, a Master's Degree in Strength & Conditioning from The University of Edinburgh, a PhD in Health Sciences from The University of Warwick, and has a solo pilot's license. He is a former director of Peak Performance Center of Excellence Ltd, a Strength & Conditioning and Injury Rehabilitation Center based in Rugby, Warwickshire, and is a consultant in strength & conditioning at the Derby Nuffield Health Hospital. Brown has also worked with talented athletes as part of the Strength & Conditioning staff at the Derbyshire Institute of Sport.

Spencer, along with fellow rugby player Mark Dunkley, are co-founders of RugbyFestUK. This annual event is designed to be the biggest celebration of the game staged outside of a major tournament and was first held on 22 – 24 September 2017, Rugby, Warwickshire, England with proceeds shared among five charities including the Wooden Spoon Society.

Spencer now runs a sports performance and injury rehabilitation business in Bermuda called Island Rehab Hub, a training instructor and Band member in the Royal Bermuda Regiment and is a player-coach for the Bermuda Police Rugby Football Club. He was reunited with his birth mother in early 2018, appeared on ITV's Long-Lost Family later that year to be reunited with his sister, and again in August 2019 for ITVs follow-up series Long Lost Family: What Happened Next.
