= Kevin Yates (rugby union) =

England international rugby union player

- Born: Kevin Peter Yates; 6 November 1972 (age 54) Medicine Hat, Alberta, Canada
- Height: 1.81 m (5 ft 11 in)
- Weight: 114 kg (17 st 13 lb)
- School: John Bentley School, Calne

Rugby union career
Senior career
Years	Team	Apps	(Points)
1993–1999	Bath	47	(15)
2001–2004	Sale	60	(0)
2004–2008	Saracens	95	(60)
2008–2009	Nice	13	(0)
Provincial / State sides
Years	Team	Apps	(Points)
1999–2000	Wellington Lions		
Super Rugby
Years	Team	Apps	(Points)
2000–2001	Hurricanes	19	(5)
International career
Years	Team	Apps	(Points)
1997–2007	England	4	(0)

Kevin Peter Yates (born 6 November 1972 in Medicine Hat, Alberta, Canada) is a retired English rugby union player whose last club was Prop for Nice in the French Fédérale 1.

Yates professional career began at Bath. He was a member of the side that won the 1995/96 Zurich Premiership. He also played in the 1998 Heineken Cup Semi-final against Pau, but did not feature in the final against CA Brive. Yates made his England debut on the 1997 tour of Argentina.

Yates received a 6-month ban he received for biting the ear of London Scottish flanker Simon Fenn on 10 January 1998 whilst playing for Bath. He subsequently moved to play for the Super 12 side Wellington Hurricanes, making his debut against the Sharks in the opening round of the 2000 Super 12.

Yates also helped the Wellington Lions win the 2000 National Provincial Championship. He joined Sale Sharks in 2001, winning the 2001–02 European Challenge Cup.

Yates joined Saracens in 2004. In 2007, he was called up for England's tour of South Africa alongside Saracens teammates Matt Cairns and Andy Farrell.

Due to Nick Wood being injured, Yates started against South Africa, a record period of time between caps. On this tour he was capped twice; his first senior England caps for 10 years.

At the end of the 2007–08 season he moved to Nice, where he played alongside Dan Luger and Will Johnson before retiring at the end of the season.
