= Steve Ravenscroft =

England international rugby union player

Stephen Charles Wood Ravenscroft (born 2 November 1970 (age 54) in Bradford) is an English former rugby union footballer who played at centre for Saracens and London Welsh. He won two England caps in 1998.

He is now a solicitor and plays occasional rugby for the SpoonAAs, formerly Anti-Assassins team, the rugby team of the Wooden Spoon charity.
