= 1999–2000 Tetley's Bitter Cup =

English rugby union competition

Tournament details
- Countries: England
- Tournament format(s): knockout

Tournament statistics

Final
- Venue: Twickenham Stadium
- Champions: Wasps (2nd title)
- Runners-up: Northampton

The 1999–00 Tetley's Bitter Cup was the 29th edition of England's rugby union club competition. Wasps won the competition defeating Northampton in the final. The event was sponsored by Tetley's Brewery and the final was held at Twickenham Stadium.

== Draw and results ==
=== First round (19 September) ===
Home	Away	Score
Amersham & Chiltern	Ruislip	25-17
Banbury	Workington	20-10
Barkers Butts	Bridlington	24-15
Belgrave	Kendal	0-27
Blaydon	Scunthorpe	16-15
Bridgwater	Metropolitan Police	13-9
Broadstreet	Bedford Athletic	24-45
Cheltenham	Havant	57-8
Cinderford	Norwich	27-18
Darlington Mowden Park	Sandal	36-24
Doncaster	Morley	17-22
Drillfield	Sedgley Park	52-67
East Grinstead	Maidenhead	13-20
Ellingham & Leatherhead	Clifton	16-11
Esher	Barking	32-6
Guildford & Godalming	Staines	17-15
Loughborough Students	Thurrock	13-25
Matson	Swanage & Wareham	23-15
North Walsham	Launceston	46-0
Old Patesians	Westcombe Park	10-27
Plymouth	Penzance & Newlyn	14-21
Redruth	Barnstaple	27-24
Selly Oak	New Brighton	10-93
Sevenoaks	Tabard	30-10
Sheffield	Aspatria	11-11 aet*
Spalding	Macclesfield	22-17
Stourbridge	Alnwick	20-8
Walsall	Nuneaton	13-17 aet
Weston-super-Mare	Bishop Stortford	23-17
Whitchurch	Liverpool St Helens	27-8

Away team progress*

=== Second round (16 October) ===
Home	Away	Score
Amersham & Chiltern	Esher	16-34
Aspatria	New Brighton	18-24
Banbury	Thurrock	13-21
Barkers Butts	Morley	17-19
Bedford Athletic	Fylde	60-21
Birmingham & Solihull	Wharfedale	14-13
Blaydon	Kendal	18-19
Cheltenham	Westcombe Park	25-23
Cinderford	Reading	21-23
Guildford & Godalming	Maidenhead	15-13
Harrogate	Preston Grasshoppers	22-32
Matson	Camberley	3-22
Newbury	North Walsham	15-0
Nottingham	Stourbridge	20-17
Penzance & Newlyn	Effingham & Leatherhead	51-12
Redruth	Lydney	22-13
Rosslyn Park	Bridgwater & Albion	47-7
Sedgley Park	Darlington Mowden Park	23-25
Sevenoaks	Blackheath	41-40
Spalding	Nuneaton	8-20
Weston-super-Mare	Bracknell	12-26
Whitchurch	Otley	0-76

=== Third round (13 & 14 November) ===
Home	Away	Score
Bedford Athletic	Exeter	14-29
Birmingham & Solihull	Waterloo	18-15
Cheltenham	Manchester	16-42
Guildford & Godalming	Darlington Mowden Park	17-48
Kendal	Worcester	27-44
Leeds Tykes	Esher	50-7
London Welsh	Newbury	35-13
Morley	Orrell	19-46
New Brighton	Otley	15-6
Nottingham	Redruth	37-21
Nuneaton	Camberley	29-19
Penzance & Newlyn	Moseley	14-27
Reading	Henley Hawks	3-41
Rotherham	Coventry	28-34
Rugby	Preston Grasshoppers	14-5
Sevenoaks	Thurrock	23-24
Wakefield	Rosslyn Park	7-28
West Hartlepool	Bracknell	17-28

=== Fourth round (1 & 3 January) ===
Home	Away	Score
Bedford	Saracens	9-33
Birmingham & Solihull	New Brighton	22-14
Bristol	Henley Hawks	23-9
Coventry	Bracknell	33-10
Darlington Mowden Park	Rosslyn Park	23-11
Gloucester	Bath	13-6
Harlequins	Thurrock	88-0
Leeds Tykes	Sale Sharks	3-13
London Welsh	Exeter	18-14
Manchester	Nottingham	50-17
Newcastle Falcons	Moseley	41-8
Northampton	Nuneaton	118-3
Orrell	Rugby	13-13*
Worcester	London Irish	8-12

- Orrell progress by virtue of more tries

=== Fifth round (29 & 30 January) ===
Home	Away	Score
Bristol	Sale Sharks	26-14
Gloucester	Orrell	54-12
Harlequins	Darlington Mowden Park	29-8
London Irish	Leicester	47-7
London Welsh	Coventry	39-16
Manchester	Birmingham/Solihull	22-11
Saracens	Northampton	32-34
London Wasps	Newcastle Falcons	36-30

=== Quarter-finals (26 February) ===
Home	Away	Score
Bristol	Harlequins	25–17
London Irish	Gloucester	34–18
London Welsh	Northampton	26–35
London Wasps	Manchester	62–3

=== Semi-finals (8 April) ===
Home	Away	Score
Bristol	London Wasps	31–44
London Irish	Northampton	17–24

=== Final ===
13 May 2000

Wasps	31–23	Northampton
Try: Lewsey; Leota; Logan; Denney; Con: Logan; Pen: King 3		Try: Pountney; Pen: Grayson 6

Twickenham Stadium, London
Attendance: 55,000
Referee: Brian Campsall (Yorkshire)

Wasps
Northampton

15	(England) Josh Lewsey
14	(England) Shane Roiser
13	(England) Mark Denney
12	(Ireland) Rob Henderson
11	(Scotland) Kenny Logan
10	(England) Alex King
9	(England) Martyn Wood
8	(England) Lawrence Dallaglio (c)
7	(England) Paul Volley
6	(England) Joe Worsley
5	(Scotland) Andy Reed
4	(England) Simon Shaw
3	(England) Will Green
2	(Samoa) Trevor Leota
1	(England) Darren Molloy
Replacements:
16	(England) Mike Friday
17	(England) John Ufton
18	(England) Fraser Waters
19	(England) Andy Le Chevalier
20	(England) Dugald Macer
21	(New Zealand) Mark Weedon
22	(England) Peter Scrivener
Coach:

15	(England) Nick Beal
14	(Scotland) Craig Moir
13	(Wales) Allan Bateman
12	(England) Matt Allen
11	(England) Ben Cohen
10	(England) Paul Grayson
9	(England) Matt Dawson
1	(South Africa) Garry Pagel
2	(Argentina) Federico Méndez
3	(Scotland) Mattie Stewart
4	(Wales) Andy Newman
5	(Scotland) Richard Metcalfe
6	(England) Tim Rodber
7	(Scotland) Budge Pountney
8	(Samoa) Pat Lam (c)
Replacements:
16	(England) Dominic Malone
17	(England) Andy Northey
18	(England) Ali Hepher
19	(England) Steve Walter
20	(Argentina) Martín Scelzo
21	(England) Jon Phillips
22	(England) Don Mackinnon
Coach:
