= Courtney Lawes =

English rugby union player (born 1989)

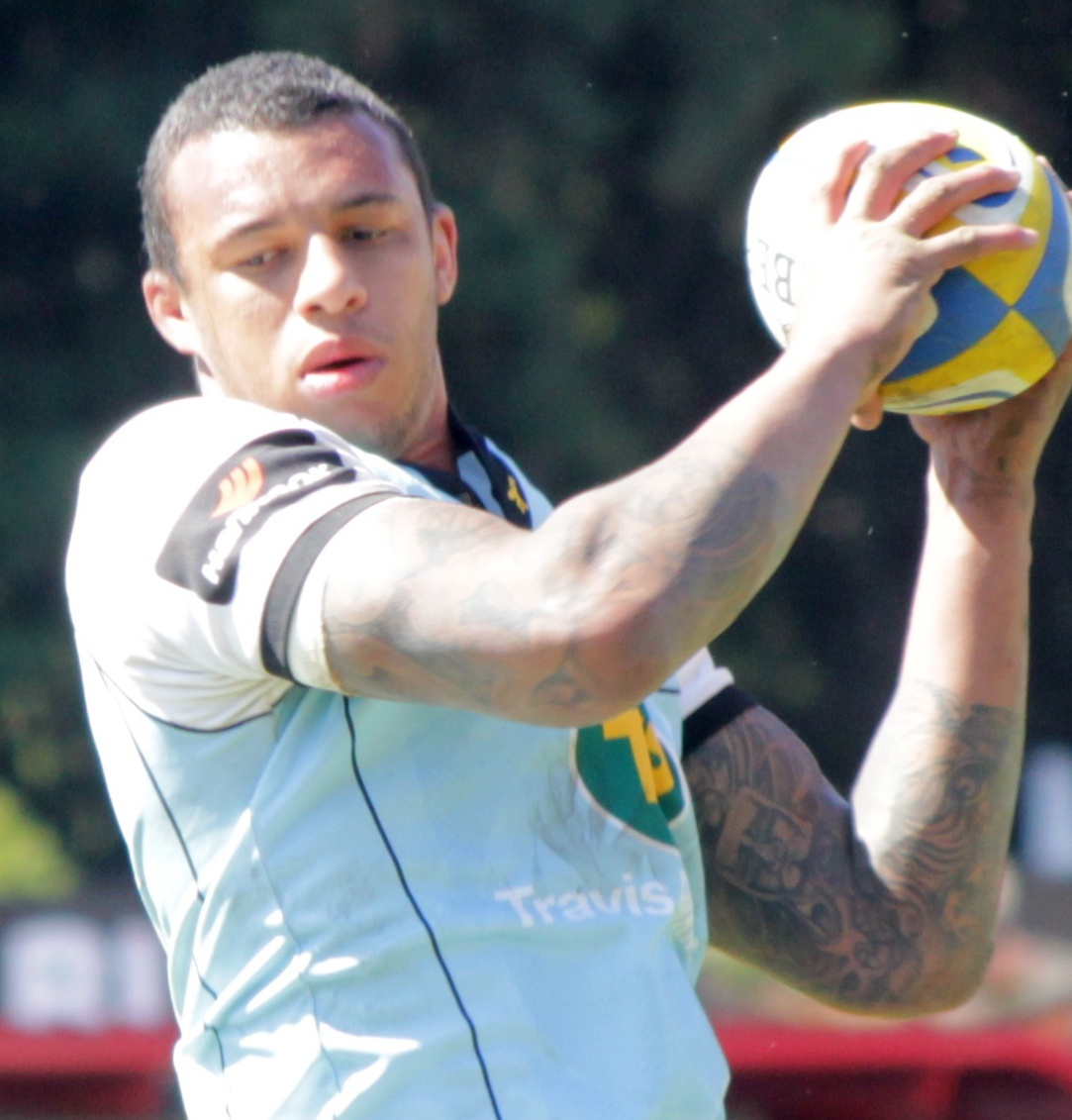
- Lawes representing Northampton Saints during the Aviva Premiership
- Full name: Courtney Linford Lawes
- Born: 23 February 1989 (age 37) Hackney, England
- Height: 2.00 m (6 ft 7 in)
- Weight: 119 kg (262 lb; 18 st 10 lb)
- School: Kingsthorpe College; Northampton School for Boys; Moulton College

Rugby union career
- Position: Flanker
- Current team: Sale Sharks
Senior career
Years	Team	Apps	(Points)
2007–2024	Northampton Saints	280	(60)
2024–2026	Brive	43	(15)
2026–	Sale Sharks	1	(0)
- Correct as of 27 September 2026
International career
Years	Team	Apps	(Points)
2008–2009	England U20	7	(5)
2009–2023	England	105	(10)
2017–2021	British & Irish Lions	5	(0)
- Correct as of 21 October 2025
Medal record
Men's Rugby union
Representing England
Rugby World Cup
Silver medal – second place	2019 Japan	Squad
Bronze medal – third place	2023 France	Squad

Courtney Linford Lawes (born 23 February 1989) is an English professional rugby union player who plays as a flanker for PREM Rugby club Sale Sharks and the England national team.

== Early life ==
Lawes was born 23 February 1989 in Hackney to a Jamaican father and English mother and moved at the age of four to the town of Northampton where his mother was from.

Lawes attended Northampton School for Boys and is a product of Northampton Old Scouts, the same club that produced his former teammate Rob Milligan as well as Ben Cohen and Steve Thompson, amongst others.

== Club career ==
In October 2007, Lawes made his Saints first team debut against Esher in National One in the 2007–08 season which ended in promotion. The following season, he began to establish a reputation as a tackler, notably in the final of the 2009 European Challenge Cup against Bourgoin where he dislocated the shoulder of Morgan Parra and in the 2015 Six Nations Championship match against France with a tackle on Jules Plisson.

In March 2010, Lawes was part of the side that beat Gloucester to win the Anglo-Welsh Cup. The following season saw him start in the 2011 Heineken Cup final at the Millennium Stadium as Northampton finished runners up to Leinster.

In May 2013, Northampton were beaten by Leicester Tigers in the Premiership final however the following season saw Lawes play an integral part in Saints securing both the Premiership and European Rugby Challenge Cup titles in 2014. They beat Bath at Cardiff Arms Park to win the Challenge Cup and the following weekend defeated Saracens to win their first ever Premiership title.

Lawes was shortlisted for the Saints Supporters' Player of the Season in 2016/17 but lost out to teammate, Louis Picamoles.

In February 2024, after 17 years at Northampton Saints, Lawes announced that he would leave the club at the end of that season to join French club Brive. On 8 June 2024, in his last game for the club, he captained Northampton Saints to their second Premiership title, beating Bath in the final at Twickenham, thus cementing his status as an all-time great for club and country. At the end of that campaign he was named in the Premiership Team of the Season. Lawes was also inducted into the Rugby Players' Association Hall of Fame.

In April 2026, it was announced that Lawes would return to PREM Rugby after signing for Sale Sharks. In September 2026, he made his debut for the club in the opening round of the new season during a loss to Bristol Bears.

== International career ==
=== England ===
Lawes won England representative honours for the U18 side and toured Australia with England Under 18s in 2007. He missed out on the 2008 U20s Six Nations through injury but featured in the IRB Junior World Championship that year. In the summer of 2009 Lawes started for the England Under 20 team that finished runners up to New Zealand in the final of the 2009 IRB Junior World Championship in Tokyo.

In July 2009, Lawes was selected for the England Saxons squad and later that year in October 2009 he received his first call-up by coach Martin Johnson to the senior England squad. On 7 November 2009, Lawes made his England test debut in the 18–9 defeat against Australia at Twickenham, replacing Louis Deacon for the last twelve minutes of the match. He was included in the squad for the 2011 Rugby World Cup and started in their quarter-final elimination against France.

After the World Cup new coach Stuart Lancaster continued to select Lawes and in December 2012 he featured in a win over New Zealand. He was selected for the 2015 Rugby World Cup and featured in two pool games against Fiji and Wales as the hosts failed to make the knockout phase.

Lawes participated in the 2016 Six Nations Championship as England achieved their first Grand Slam in over a decade. He came off the bench in all three tests as England completed a series whitewash on their 2016 tour of Australia and later that year scored his first international try on his fiftieth cap against South Africa. The following year saw Lawes start in the last match of the 2017 Six Nations Championship which England lost away to Ireland ensuring they failed to complete consecutive grand slams and also brought an end to a record equalling eighteen successive Test victories.

Lawes was included in the squad for the 2019 Rugby World Cup. He started all three knockout games against Australia in the quarter-final, victory over New Zealand in the semi-final and defeat to South Africa in the final as England finished runners up.

Lawes was a member of the side that won the 2020 Six Nations Championship. On 6 November 2021, Lawes captained England for the first time, in a game against Tonga. He also led the side during their 2022 tour of Australia as England won the series.

Lawes was named in the squad for the 2023 Rugby World Cup. He made his 100th appearance for England in a warm-up defeat against Fiji. Lawes scored his second international try in a pool stage victory over Japan. He started in their semi-final elimination against champions South Africa. After the tournament Lawes retired from international duty.

After returning from France to play his club rugby back in England, Lawes reversed his decision to retire and made himself available again for England selection. In September 2026, he revealed he had spoken with head coach Steve Borthwick about being called up. In the same week, he voiced his support for overseas English-qualified players to play for England. The following month, he re-iterated this belief but also expressed his support for a minimum cap rule before players could move overseas and still qualify for England.

=== British and Irish Lions ===
On 19 April 2017, it was announced that Lawes would be heading to New Zealand with the British & Irish Lions for their summer tour, with his Saints teammate George North. Lawes was handed his first Lions starting place for the Lions' second game of the tour, against the Blues. He did not feature in the first test but did come off the bench in the second and third tests as the series finished level.

Lawes was also selected by coach Warren Gatland for the 2021 British & Irish Lions tour to South Africa. He started all three tests at flanker as the Lions lost the series 2–1.

== Personal life ==
As of 2017, Lawes and his wife Jessica have four children.

== Career statistics ==
=== List of international tries ===
As of 18 September 2023

Try	Opposing team	Location	Venue	Competition	Date	Result	Score
1	South Africa	London, England	Twickenham Stadium	2016 Autumn Internationals	12 November 2016	Win	37 – 21
2	Japan	Nice, France	Stade de Nice	2023 Rugby World Cup	17 September 2023	Win	34 – 12

== Honours ==
England

- 3× Six Nations Championship: 2016, 2017, 2020
- 1× Rugby World Cup runner-up: 2019

Northampton Saints

- 2× PREM Rugby: 2013–2014, 2023–2024
- 1× Anglo-Welsh Cup: 2009–2010
- 2× EPCR Challenge Cup: 2008–2009, 2013–2014
- 1× RFU Championship: 2007–2008
- 1× European Rugby Champions Cup runner up: 2010–2011
- 1× PREM Rugby runner-up: 2012–2013
