= Kings' School, Winchester =

School in Winchester, Hampshire, England

Kings' School

Location
- Romsey Road; Winchester, Hampshire, SO22 5PN; England; 51.0589°N 1.3469°W

Information
- Type: comprehensive community school
- Motto: Una Laborantes ("Working Together")
- Local authority: Hampshire
- Department for Education URN: 116468 Tables
- Ofsted: Reports
- Head teacher: James Adams
- Gender: Mixed
- Age: 11 to 16
- Enrolment: 1657
- Website: www.kings-winchester.hants.sch.uk

Kings' School is a comprehensive school in Winchester, Hampshire, with approximately 1,650 pupils. Kings' School previously had specialist status as a Business and Enterprise College and as a Language College.

== History ==
Kings' School was formed in 1985 by merging the two previous schools on the site: Danemark School (girls) and Montgomery of Alamein School (boys). These schools trace their roots back to the Wesleyan Day School (1889), St Thomas's School (1893), St Mary's School (1900), and Danemark Central School (1912). To begin with teaching was split between both the former Montgomery site (Kings South) and the former Danemark site (Kings North). By 1993 all teaching had transferred into the largely redeveloped Danemark site. The main hall, science block, sports hall and maths block of the Montgomery site were demolished in 1993 and housing now stands on the site. The current Kings' School now stands on the former Danemark site and has expanded out the back towards Sarum Road.

== Academic achievement ==
According to the most recent available data, from the 2019 Department for Education league tables, Kings' Progress 8 score is average within Hampshire and below both other state secondary schools situated in Winchester.

== Curriculum ==
The school teaches a large number of subjects, both at Key Stage 3 and Key Stage 4. Most courses are assessed in the form of a GCSE qualification taken at the end of Year 11, but the school does offer a couple of more vocational courses.

=== Key Stage 3 – Years 7 to 9 ===
Key Stage 3 pupils are taught the UK's National Curriculum. All pupils study the following subjects: English, Mathematics, Science, Business Studies and Computer Science (in a combined subject called Business and Enterprise Education or BEE), Physical Education, Religious Studies, History, Geography, Music, Art, Drama, Design Technology, Food Technology and PSHE. All pupils take a language in Year 7, either French, Spanish, German or Italian. Some pupils may study a second language in Year 8, either French, Spanish, German or Italian. They can also take Latin which either replaces one of their English lessons or is taught outside of school.

=== Key Stage 4 – Years 10 to 11 ===
On average, pupils enter 10 GCSE or equivalent qualifications at the end of Year 11. All pupils in Year 10 and 11 study the following examined subjects: English Language, English Literature, Science (BTEC, Combined or Triple), Mathematics. Pupils in Year 10 and 11 also study PSHE and PE, but these subjects are not examined. Other subjects that are offered at GCSE level include: Art, Child Development, Computer Science, Drama, French, Food Preparation and Nutrition, Geography, German, Health and Social Care, History, Italian, Latin, Media Studies, Music, Photography, PE, Psychology, Religious Studies, Sociology, Spanish and Textiles. The school also offers OCR National courses in Business Enterprise, ICT and Sport Studies.

== Facilities ==
The school's facilities include an indoor swimming pool (which is used both by pupils and local swimming schools), an astro turf and The Tower Arts Centre, which is used for drama and dance rehearsals and performances, as well as exercise classes, conferences, meetings and training workshops. There is also a climbing wall and bouldering wall available for public use.

== Catchment area ==
Kings' School has a large catchment area, from Winchester to the southern surrounding villages. Students from outside the catchment area are brought in by bus from as far north as Andover to as far south as Southampton. Unusually for a State Comprehensive school, Kings' School previously had a boys' boarding house, the Kings' School House. The boarding house closed in August 2015 after a review by Hampshire County Council

== Criticism ==
In November 2008, a girl was to be taught in isolation as a result of dyeing her hair. Later that month, several parents complained that new restrictions regarding the colour of underwear were unfair and an invasion of privacy. The school stated that it was a misunderstanding, as it was a suggestion only, not a new rule.

== Notable former pupils ==
- Albert Booth, politician (at St Thomas's School).
- Jack Dee, stand-up comedian, actor and writer (at Montgomery of Alamein School).
- Colin Firth, film, television and stage actor (at Montgomery of Alamein School).
- Anthony 'Budge' Pountney, Scottish rugby player, former player and director of rugby at Northampton Saints.
- Philip Somerville, milliner (at St Thomas's School).
- Wayne Bridge, former footballer.
