= Stephen Myler =

England international rugby union & league footballer

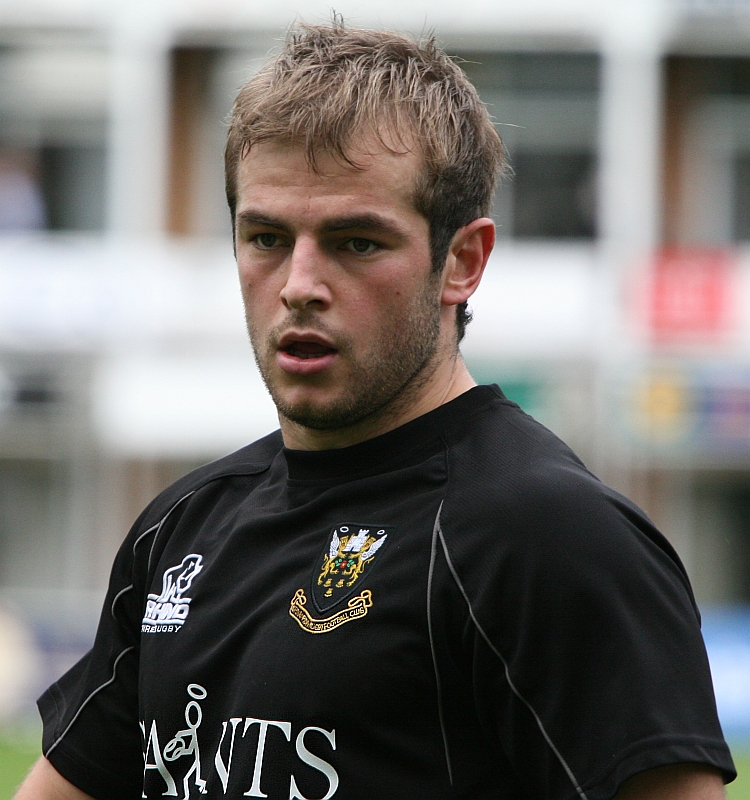
- Myler in 2009

Personal information
- Born: Stephen Myler; 21 July 1984 (age 42) Widnes, England
- Height: 6 ft 2 in (188 cm)
- Weight: 14 st 13 lb (95 kg)

Playing information
- Position: Stand-off
Club
Years	Team	Pld	T	G	FG	P
2001–02	St. Helens	0	0	0	0	0
2002–05	Widnes Vikings	51	9	85	0	206
2005–06	Salford City Reds	15	1	16	0	36
	Total	66	10	101	0	242

Rugby union career
- Position: Fly-half
Senior career
Years	Team	Apps	(Points)
2006–2018	Northampton Saints	330	(2,655)
2018–2020	London Irish	25	(156)
2020–2023	Ospreys	32	(243)
- Correct as of 29 Feb 2024
International career
Years	Team	Apps	(Points)
2009–	England Saxons	3	(36)
2013-	England	1	(2)
- Correct as of 19 February 2025
- Relatives: Tony Myler (uncle); Frank Myler (great uncle)

Stephen Myler (born 21 July 1984) is an English former rugby player. He played most of his career with the Northampton Saints in Premiership Rugby, as well as London Irish, and Ospreys in the United Rugby Championship.

== Rugby league career ==
Myler was born 21 July 1984 in Widnes.

After leaving Wade Deacon High School in Widnes at 16 he signed for the St Helens Academy, he did not make an appearance for their first team.

Myler joined the Widnes Vikings for 2003's Super League VIII. He made 49 Super League appearances for the Vikings, scoring 180 points.

Myler signed with the Salford City Reds for 2006's Super League XI.

Stephen comes from a famous Rugby League family. His father is John Myler who played full back for Widnes Vikings RLFC. His uncle is Tony Myler, a former Widnes captain and GB International and was one of the most gifted footballers of his generation. Stephen's great uncle is Frank Myler who captained the last British side to win a series in Australia in 1970.

== Rugby union career ==
In 2006, Myler made the switch to Rugby Union when he joined Northampton Saints. He made his début in the Guinness Premiership against Saracens.

He established himself as a great kicker for the squad, scoring a high percentage of Place kicks for the 2008–09 season. It was during this season that Myler started in the final of the European Challenge Cup, scoring all of Saints' points as they defeated Bourgoin.

In 2014 Myler started and scored three conversions and a penalty as Northampton beat Saracens to win the Premiership final.

In 2016 Myler started his 10th year at the Midlands side and hit his 1500th Aviva Premiership point after converting Louis Picamoles' try against Gloucester on Friday 28 October.

On 23 March 2018 it was confirmed that after 12 years at Northampton Saints Myler would be leaving the club. Stephen Myler was a hugely influential player at the club, marking up 325 caps and 2618 points since joining the club in 2006.

Myler joined London Irish ahead of the 2018–19 RFU Championship season, and helped the team return to the Premiership on the first attempt.

He currently sits in 2nd place in the Northampton Saints all-time points scored record, 168 points behind fellow fly half Paul Grayson. Myler also ranks in 3rd place in the Premiership all-time points record behind Andy Goode in 2nd and Charlie Hodgson in 1st place.

He was released from London Irish ahead of the 2020–21 season.

He signed for URC side Ospreys on a one-year deal ahead of the 2020–21 season.

On 22 March 2023, Myler announced that he would retire at the end of the season on his Instagram.

== International career ==
His form led to a selection for the England Saxons at the 2009 Churchill Cup, making his début against Argentina Jaguars.

After an injury to Alex Goode he was called up to the England squad in May 2013. He made his début as a substitute for Freddie Burns in England's victory over Argentina, scoring a conversion.
