= Arthur Blakiston =

English rugby union footballer and baronet (1892–1974)

Sir Arthur Frederick Blakiston, 7th Baronet, MC (16 June 1892 – 2 February 1974) was a rugby union international wing who represented England twelve times between 1920 and 1925, and the British Lions in all four test matches during their 1924 tour of South Africa.

Blakiston was educated at Bedford School, Trent College and Emmanuel College, Cambridge. He served in the Great War as an officer in the Royal Field Artillery and was awarded the Military Cross. He played for Northampton, Liverpool, Blackheath and the Barbarians. A farmer, he was Master of the South Shropshire Foxhounds.

Baronetage of Great Britain
| Preceded by Charles Edward Blakiston | Baronet (of London); 1941–1974 | Succeeded by Arthur Norman Hunter Blakiston |
