= Bruce Reihana =

NZ international rugby union player

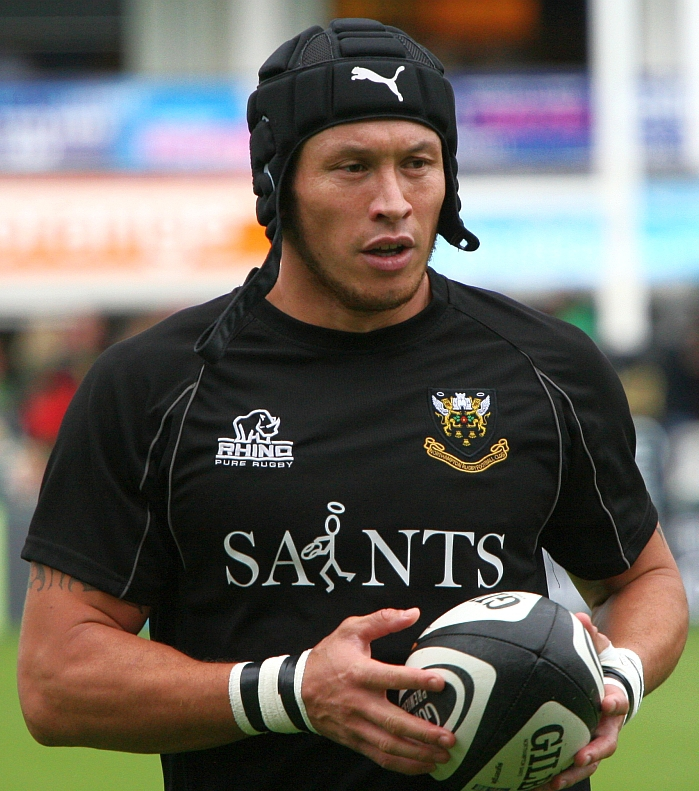
- Born: Trevor Bruce Reihana; 6 April 1976 (age 50) Thames, New Zealand
- Height: 184 cm (6 ft 0 in)
- Weight: 93 kg (14 st 9 lb; 205 lb)
- School: Te Awamutu College

Rugby union career
- Position: Fullback/Wing/Fly-half
Senior career
Years	Team	Apps	(Points)
2002–2011	Northampton	236	(1032)
2011–2014	Bordeaux-Bègles	48	(70)
- Correct as of 2 October 2010
Provincial / State sides
Years	Team	Apps	(Points)
1996–2002	Waikato	81	(385)
- Correct as of 9 September 2006
Super Rugby
Years	Team	Apps	(Points)
1997–2002	Chiefs	58	(123)
International career
Years	Team	Apps	(Points)
2000	New Zealand	3	(10)
–	New Zealand Māori	11	
- Correct as of 1 Sep 2006
National sevens team
Years	Team		Comps
1998, 2002	New Zealand		
Medal record
Men's rugby sevens
Representing New Zealand
Commonwealth Games
Gold medal – first place	1998 Kuala Lumpur	Team competition
Gold medal – first place	2002 Manchester	Team competition

Bruce Trevor Reihana (born 6 April 1976) is a former rugby union rugby player. He was a utility back, most notably for the majority of his career as captain of Northampton Saints in the English Premiership.

== Biography ==
Born in Thames, New Zealand, Reihana started playing in the National Provincial Championship level with Waikato in 1996 and led them to two Ranfurly Shield victories out of three. He played for the Chiefs in the former Super 12 from 1997 to 2002 with 58 games and 123 points to his name.

Internationally, Reihana represented the New Zealand Sevens in the rugby sevens. He played in the 1998 Commonwealth Games and the 2002 Commonwealth Games, winning gold medals on each occasion. He made 11 appearances for New Zealand Māori. He made his debut for New Zealand against France on 18 November 2000.

After not renewing his contract with the New Zealand Rugby Union in 2002, Reihana managed to get an overseas contact with Premiership side the Northampton Saints. He was used at fullback and became an influential figure for the Saints and even won the 2003–2004 PRA Players' Player of the Year Award.

Reihana was scheduled to return to New Zealand rugby after his stint in Europe, but it did not materialise as he decided to stay in England citing personal reasons. Resuming his career with the Saints, Reihana was promoted to captain after Steve Thompson decided to step down as co-captain.

During a 2006–07 Guinness Premiership match against Gloucester on 23 September 2006, Reihana suffered a knee ligament injury that would sideline him until 2007.

Reihana relinquished the Saints captaincy at the end of the 2008–09 Guinness Premiership, when Dylan Hartley was appointed in his place.

On 2 October 2010 Reihana scored 17 points against the Exeter Chiefs to take him through the milestone of 1,000 points for the Saints.

Bruce left the Northampton Saints at the end of the 2010–11 Aviva Premiership to join the French team, Bordeaux. This was announced over BBC Radio Northampton during the final Aviva Premiership game of the season, against Leeds Carnegie, as Bruce Reihana joined the field.

At the end of the 2013–2014 Season, Reihana retired as a player from professional rugby and became the skills coach for the Bordeaux rugby team. He has since moved to Bristol at the beginning of the 2017/18 season to work with Bristol Rugby.

Bruce Reihana was the Skills and Performance Coach with Bristol Bears and still trained with his players in his fitness programs, he followed this mantra in doing the same with Bordeaux Begles Rugby and is still up with the fitness of players in the first fifteen.

In August 2020, Reihana left his role with Bristol Bears and became skills and attack coach for Clifton Rugby, linking up with former Bristol Captain Matt Salter for the National 2 south frontrunners as they bid to seal promotion to National League 1.

In June 2021 he left Clifton to join Montpellier in the French Top 14 and was part of their title-winning staff in the 2021–22 season

He is currently the attack coach for the ProD2 team CA-Brive.
