= Ron Jacobs (rugby union) =

England international rugby union player

- Born: Charles Ronald Jacobs; 28 October 1928 Whittlesey, England
- Died: 10 November 2002 (aged 74) Whittlesey, England
- Height: 5 ft 9 in (1.75 m)
- School: Oakham School
- University: University of Nottingham
- Occupation: Farmer

Rugby union career
- Position: Prop
Amateur team(s)
Years	Team	Apps	(Points)
- Peterborough RFC
1949–1966	Northampton		
International career
Years	Team	Apps	(Points)
1956–1964	England	29	

Charles Ronald Jacobs (28 October 1928 – 10 November 2002) was an English Rugby Union player. He played at prop for Northampton and England. He went to Oakham School in Rutland, where he captained the first XV in 1945. He studied agriculture at the University of Nottingham.

Jacobs played a club record 470 games for Northampton over a 17-year period and appeared 29 times for England - captaining them for his final two games in 1964.

After retiring from playing, Jacobs remained involved in Rugby and became president of the Rugby Football Union in 1983 and was tour manager during the controversial 1984 England rugby union tour of South Africa.
