= East Midlands Derby (rugby union) =

East Midlands Derby (Rugby Union)
- Location: Northamptonshire/Leicestershire
- Teams: Leicester Tigers; Northampton Saints
- First meeting: 3 March 1888; Leicester F.C 4–0 Northampton F.C
- Latest meeting: 31 January 2026; Premiership Rugby Cup; Northampton Saints 40-22 Leicester Tigers

Statistics
- Total meetings: 78 Professional Era, 255 (total)
- Most wins: Leicester Tigers (50)
- Most player appearances: Ben Youngs (Leicester Tigers) (28)
- All-time record: Leicester Tigers: 50*; Draw: 2* Northampton Saints: 27* *professional era

The East Midlands Derby is a sports derby contested between the rugby union clubs Leicester Tigers and Northampton Saints, both of which are based in the East Midlands. It has been contested for over 130 years and is frequently cited as the most important game for both clubs in the regular season, as well as one of the greatest rivalries in the sport of Rugby Union.

The derby has been contested 260 times as of April 2026. Since the beginning of the Premiership in 1987, and the European Rugby Cup in 1995, the derby has been contested 78 times, with Leicester winning 50 of these games.

== History ==
=== Beginnings (1888–1950) ===
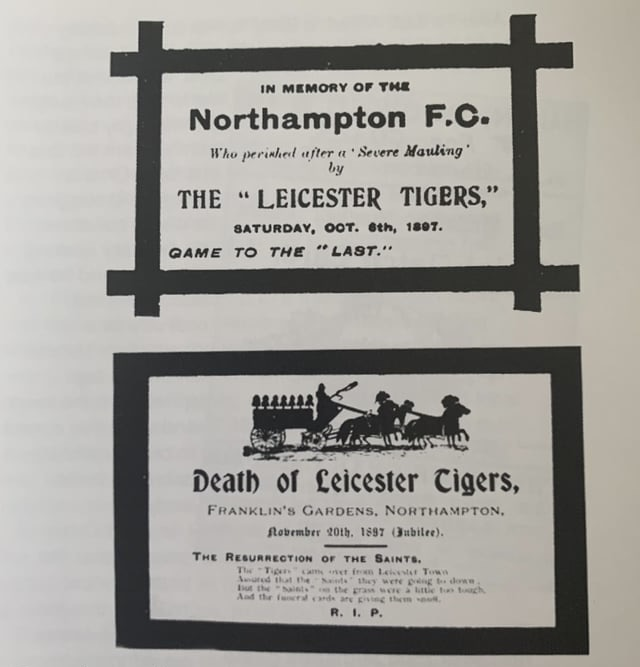
"Obituary cards" used as a humorous way of advertising the 1897 derby.

The derby was first contested on 3 March 1888 in Leicester. The match took place in Victoria Park in Leicester and was viewed by around 1,000 spectators. Leicester won this first game and Edgar Phillips, a Leicester player, scored the first try ever in this meeting.

Though done so on a friendly basis, another game was organised for a month later, kickstarting the rivalry. By 1894, the Leicester Mercury noted instances of "roughness" between the two teams.

Northampton's first win did not arrive until November 1905 when a travelling Saints team won away at Welford Road. By the early 1900s, crowds of 15,000+ were turning out to witness this, by then, important game.

=== Development of the rivalry (1950–1990) ===
By the middle of the 20th century, the rivalry had become considerably more balanced, with roughly even wins being split between the two sides from the 1950s–1980s, despite individual internal issues affecting each club.

The 1980s saw a period of Leicester domination, though Saints did gain a couple of notable victories, such as denying Tigers an undefeated season in 1982, and beating them again in 1989.

=== Professionalism (1990–2010) ===
Since the creation of the premiership and the beginning of the professional era in 1995, there have been 78 meetings between the club.

The 1990s again saw Leicester win the majority. Despite individual successes for the Saints, such as their 2000 Heineken Cup victory, Tigers still remained dominant in the derby with a nine year long win streak only being interrupted by a Saints victory in 2003.

2007–2008 was the first year in over a century that no game between the two teams took place, due to the Saints relegation the previous year and the packed schedule of the post-professionalism period.

=== "Golden years" of the derby (2010–2015) ===
By the late 2010s, Saints had rebuilt and were stronger than ever, winning every derby game from 2009 to 2011. These games were marred by on pitch violence, with frequent punch ups occurring on the field of play, and several notable sanctions and cards being placed on both teams.

The end of the 2012–2013 season saw arguably the biggest Derby ever with both teams meeting in the Premiership Final. The game was hotly contested and as physical as ever, but ultimately Tigers won 37–17 after the first ever red card in a premiership final was given to Saints captain, Dylan Hartley for swearing at referee Wayne Barnes after a collapsed scrum. The game set a record attendance of 82,000 for an East Midlands Derby game.

The next year saw one of Saints' greatest ever derby day victories, with a last minute Premiership semi-final victory over Tigers at home. Saints would then go on to win their first ever Premiership title after beating Saracens in extra time.

=== Golden years continued (2015–present) ===
The competitiveness of the early 2010s continued throughout the decade, though no knockout games were contested between the two until 2022. Following one win each in the 2014–15 season, the 2015–16 season saw a Leicester clean sweep, though only by 3 and 6 points in each respective game. The 2016–17 season was equally as competitive with Leicester narrowly winning both derbies again. In 2017–18 Saints replied by winning both derbies themselves, by a large margin in both cases. During the Derby at Welford Road, Australian international Rob Horne was selected to captain the Saints for the first time. 13 seconds into the game he made a hard opening tackle and in doing so, severely damaged the nerves in his right arm. It was announced that he would retire the following weekend.

==== The Derby at Twickenham ====
Following the career ending injury to Rob Horne in the previous year's Derby in Leicester, it was decided by both clubs that the next year's first derby should be held at Twickenham Stadium (instead of Franklin's Gardens), with £5 per ticket going to Horne directly and fans being given the further opportunity to donate when purchasing tickets. After Horne delivered the match ball, Leicester won the game 23–15 in front of 40,000 spectators, a new record for a regular season derby.

==== Turn of the decade and empty stadiums ====
Saints replied the following derby, by beating Tigers 29–15 at Welford Road, following this up next season by comfortably beating Leicester at the gardens 36–13. The reply came in September 2020, with the first "closed off" derby seeing Leicester win 28–24 at home in front of an empty stadium as a result of the COVID-19 pandemic.

The following season saw only one derby after the Northampton-based game was cancelled due to players contracting the Virus. The Saints later won 23–18 at Welford Road in a closely competed April 2021 game.

By October 2021, the new season saw crowds back in the stadiums, with the first sold out derby in nearly two years seeing Saints comfortably beaten 55–26 at home, Tigers later followed this up with a 35–20 win in Leicester in February 2022.

==== 2021–22 Knockouts ====
The first knockout game in nearly a decade finally happened after Leicester and Saints finished first and fourth in the Premiership respectively. Leicester went on to win the game 27–14 in front of a packed Welford Road, later managing to beat Saracens in the final.

==== Competitive era continued ====
Tigers followed up on their Premiership victory by beating Saints 41–21 at Franklin's Gardens the next season. Saints had the last word however, after a last minute 19–18 win in Leicester in January 2023.

The next year, which would later see the Saints first Premiership title in a decade, was equally as competitive, with Leicester beating Saints 26–17 at home, only for Saints to later hammer Leicester 40–17 at Welford Road in April.

The era from 2011 to 2024 has seen an even number of victories for both teams, as well as a record regular season crowd and two Premiership titles each.

== Stadiums ==
Since the 1890s, both teams have had their permanent homes in their current stadiums.

Comparison
	Northampton Saints	Leicester Tigers
Stadium	Franklin's Gardens	Welford Road Stadium
Capacity	15,249	25,849
Previous avg. attendance	14,291 (94%)	21,633 (84%)
Constructed	1880	1892
Reconstructed	1897, c.1947, 1966, c.1990, 2001, 2005, 2015	1920, 1995, 2009, 2015
