= 2008–09 European Challenge Cup =

Tournament details
- Countries: England; France; Ireland; Italy; Romania; Spain
- Tournament format(s): Round-robin and Knockout
- Date: 9 October 2008 to 22 May 2009

Tournament statistics
- Teams: 20
- Matches played: 67
- Top point scorer(s): Stephen Myler (Northampton) (133 points)
- Top try scorer(s): Chris Ashton (Northampton) (7 tries)

Final
- Venue: Twickenham Stoop
- Attendance: 9,260
- Champions: (England) Northampton Saints (1st title)
- Runners-up: (France) Bourgoin

The 2008–09 European Challenge Cup was the 13th season of the European Challenge Cup, the annual rugby union European club competition for clubs from six nations in European rugby. It started in October 2008 and ended with the final at the Twickenham Stoop in London on 22 May 2009, in which Northampton Saints defeated Bourgoin 15–3. With the win, the Saints not only claimed the trophy, but also won a berth in the 2009–10 Heineken Cup.

== Teams ==
Seven French teams competed instead of the normal eight, as a French team, Toulouse, progressed farther in the previous year's Heineken Cup than any English or Italian team.

Other nations had their usual number of participants: England six, Italy four, Ireland one, Spain one and Romania one.

England	France	Ireland	Italy	Romania	Spain
Bristol London Irish Newcastle Falcons Northampton Saints Saracens Worcester Warriors	Bayonne Brive Bourgoin Montpellier Toulon Mont-de-Marsan Dax	Connacht	Overmach Parma Petrarca Padova Rovigo Viadana	București Oaks	El Salvador

== Pool stage ==
The draw for the pool stages took place on 23 June 2008. The draw was conducted using the ERC European Ranking system which was based on the qualified teams' performances and participation in the Heineken Cup and knock-out stages of the European Challenge Cup over the past four seasons.

Key to colours
Winner of each pool, advance to quarterfinals. Seed # in parentheses
Three highest-scoring second-place teams advance to quarterfinals. Seed # in parentheses

=== Pool 1 ===
Team	P	W	D	L	Tries for	Tries against	Try diff	Points for	Points against	Points diff	TB	LB	Pts
(England) London Irish (1)	6	6	0	0	44	3	+41	300	34	+266	5	0	29
(Ireland) Connacht (7)	6	4	0	2	20	19	+1	159	140	+19	3	0	19
(Italy) Rovigo	6	1	0	5	7	25	−18	79	199	–120	0	1	5
(France) Dax	6	1	0	5	5	29	−24	55	220	–165	0	0	4

=== Pool 2 ===
Team	P	W	D	L	Tries for	Tries against	Try diff	Points for	Points against	Points diff	TB	LB	Pts
(England) Northampton Saints (2)	6	6	0	0	37	7	+30	278	69	+209	5	0	29
(England) Bristol	6	3	0	3	14	21	−7	140	168	−28	1	1	14
(France) Montpellier	6	2	0	4	10	18	−8	101	159	−58	0	1	9
(France) RC Toulon	6	1	0	5	7	22	−15	84	207	−123	0	1	5

=== Pool 3 ===
Team	P	W	D	L	Tries for	Tries against	Try diff	Points for	Points against	Points diff	TB	LB	Pts
(England) Worcester Warriors (4)	6	5	0	1	36	8	+28	255	94	+161	4	0	24
(France) Bourgoin (8)	6	3	0	3	18	11	+7	158	115	+43	1	2	15
(Italy) Petrarca Padova	6	3	0	3	11	28	−17	112	206	−94	0	1	13
(Romania) București Oaks	6	1	0	5	8	26	−18	87	197	−110	0	1	5

=== Pool 4 ===
Team	P	W	D	L	Tries for	Tries against	Try diff	Points for	Points against	Points diff	TB	LB	Pts
(France) Brive (5)	6	5	0	1	33	8	+25	243	89	+154	3	1	24
(England) Newcastle Falcons (6)	6	4	0	2	24	8	+16	178	90	+88	2	1	19
(Italy) Overmach Parma	6	3	0	3	19	13	+6	165	120	+45	2	2	16
(Spain) El Salvador	6	0	0	6	5	52	−47	46	333	−287	0	0	0

=== Pool 5 ===
Team	P	W	D	L	Tries for	Tries against	Try diff	Points for	Points against	Points diff	TB	LB	Pts
(England) Saracens (3)	6	6	0	0	20	1	+19	200	43	+157	2	0	26
(Italy) Viadana	6	3	0	3	8	11	−3	120	126	−6	0	1	13
(France) Bayonne	6	3	0	3	9	11	−2	99	122	−23	0	0	12
(France) Mont-de-Marsan	6	0	0	0	4	18	−14	54	182	−128	0	1	1

== Seeding and runners-up ==
Seed	Pool Winners	Pts	TF	+/-
1	(England) London Irish	29	44	+266
2	(England) Northampton Saints	29	37	+209
3	(England) Saracens	26	20	+157
4	(England) Worcester Warriors	24	36	+161
5	(France) Brive	24	33	+154
Seed	Pool Runners-up	Pts	TF	+/-
6	(England) Newcastle Falcons	19	24	+88
7	(Ireland) Connacht	19	20	+19
8	(France) Bourgoin	15	18	+43
–	(England) Bristol	14	14	−28
–	(Italy) Viadana	13	8	−6

== Knockout stage ==
Unlike the Heineken Cup, the Challenge Cup did not conduct a semi-final draw at the time (such a draw would be instituted for the 2009–10 edition). The top half of the draw matched the 1 and 8 seeds in one quarter-final, and the 4 and 5 seeds in the other, and the bottom half matched 2 against 7 and 3 against 6; the higher (lower-numbered) seeds all play at home. The knockout stage was not reseeded after the quarter-finals. Home advantage for the semi-finals was awarded to the highest remaining seed in each half of the draw. Home advantage in the final went to the top remaining seed.

=== Quarter-finals ===
9 April 2009
19:30

London Irish (England)	30–32	(France) Bourgoin
Tries: Mapusua 56' c S. Armitage 80+2' m Con: D. Armitage (1/2); Pen: D. Armitage (5/6) 11', 16', 31', 40', 71'; Drop: Kennedy (1/1) 79'	Report	Tries: Forest 42' c Nicolas 77' c Con: Parra (2/2); Pen: Parra (4/5) 6', 37', 59', 63'; Drop: Boyet (2/4) 28', 72'

Madejski Stadium, Reading
Attendance: 6,455
Referee: Peter Allen (Scotland)

11 April 2009
13:00

Worcester Warriors (England)	29–18	(France) Brive
Tries: Garvey (2) 11' c, 72' c Sanderson 22' c Grove 52' m Con: Jones (3/4); Pen: Jones (1/1) 9'	Report	Tries: Cooke (2) 35' m, 44' c Con: Palisson (1/2); Pen: Goode (1/1) 17'; Palisson (1/1) 66'

Sixways Stadium, Worcester
Attendance: 4,323
Referee: Peter Fitzgibbon (Ireland)

11 April 2009
15:00

Northampton Saints (England)	42–13	(Ireland) Connacht
Tries: Best 71' c Ansbro 74' m Reihana 79' c Mayor 80' m Con: Myler (1/2); Everitt (1/2); Pen: Myler (6/6) 16', 24', 37', 45', 55', 65'	Report	Try: Ofisa 52' c Con: Keatley (1/1); Pen: Keatley (1/1) 19'; Drop: Keatley (1/1) 29'

Franklin's Gardens, Northampton
Attendance: 9,119
Referee: Romain Poite (France)

12 April 2009
15:00

Saracens (England)	32–13	(England) Newcastle Falcons
Tries: Johnston 26' c Barritt 30' c Con: Jackson (2/2); Pen: Jackson (5/5) 15', 23', 53', 65', 68'; Drop: Jackson (1/1) 38'	Report	Tries: Williams 58' m Dowson 79' m Pen: May (1/1) 9'

Vicarage Road, Watford
Attendance: 7,711
Referee: Carlo Damasco (Italy)

=== Semi-finals ===
1 May 2009
19:45

Northampton Saints (England)	16–13	(England) Saracens
Try: Reihana 30' c Con: Myler (1/1); Pen: Myler (2/2) 7', 13'; Drop: Myler (1/1) 74'	Report	Try: Penney 73' c Con: Jackson (1/1); Pen: Jackson (2/2) 5', 52'

Franklin's Gardens, Northampton
Attendance: 11,073
Referee: Romain Poite (France)

2 May 2009
13:30

Bourgoin (France)	22–11	(England) Worcester Warriors
Try: Levast 62' c Con: Parra (1/1); Pen: Parra (4/4) 10', 43', 52', 58'; Drop: Boyet (1/1) 60'	Report	Try: Benjamin 78' m Pen: Carlisle (2/2) 28', 35'

Stade Pierre Rajon, Bourgoin
Attendance: 8,200
Referee: Peter Fitzgibbon (Ireland)

=== Final ===
22 May 2009
19:45

Northampton Saints (England)	15–3	(France) Bourgoin
Pen: Myler (5/5) 9', 20', 38', 48', 69'	Report	Pen: Parra (1/1) 33'

Twickenham Stoop, London
Attendance: 9,260
Referee: George Clancy (Ireland)

== See also ==
- 2008–09 Heineken Cup
