= Budge Pountney =

Scotland international rugby union player

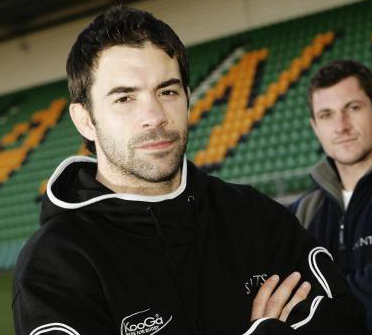
- Born: Andy Charles Pountney; 13 November 1973 (age 53) Southampton, England
- Height: 183 cm (6 ft 0 in)
- Weight: 97 kg (214 lb)
- School: Kings' School, Winchester

Rugby union career
- Position: Flanker
Amateur team(s)
Years	Team	Apps	(Points)
1992–1994	Northampton Saints		
- Correct as of 5 March 2007
Senior career
Years	Team	Apps	(Points)
1994–2003	Northampton Saints	215	(230)
- Correct as of 5 March 2007
International career
Years	Team	Apps	(Points)
1998–2002	Scotland	31	((25 from 5 tries))
- Correct as of 5 March 2007
Coaching career
- Years: Team
- 2003–2005: Northampton Saints
- Correct as of 5 March 2007

Anthony Charles 'Budge' Pountney (born 13 November 1973) is a rugby union coach and retired player. A flanker, he played in the Northampton Saints side that won the 1999–2000 Heineken Cup.

Pountney was born in Southampton in England, but had a grandmother from the Channel Islands which made him eligible for any of the British national teams. He won 31 caps for Scotland from 1998 to 2002. He was part of the Scotland team that won the 1999 Five Nations Championship, played in the 1999 World Cup, and later captained the team.

After retiring, he was head coach and later director of rugby at Northampton. He later worked in club and school coaching. He is now the development director for Ulster Rugby.

== Early life ==
Pountney was born in Southampton, the son of a farm manager. He attended Weeke Primary School, Kings' School and Peter Symonds College in Winchester. He studied at Bedford College and gained a BA Honours in European Studies and Sports Studies. He was eligible to play rugby for Scotland by virtue of a grandmother born in the Channel Islands; as a dependency of the Crown outside of the United Kingdom, people from the Islands are eligible to represent whichever of the Home Nations they choose.

== Playing career ==
He began playing rugby for the Winchester RFC mini rugby sides.

=== Northampton club rugby ===
At age 18 he joined Northampton Rugby Union Football Club who were playing in what was then the First Division. His senior debut came in 1994, against Coventry R.F.C. He had played for the England Students and U21s but had never really felt like he fitted in.

He started in the Northampton side that won the 2000 Heineken Cup Final, defeating Munster at Twickenham. He was club captain from 2001 to 2004. He had broken his nose twice that season, but with the Northampton squad stretched, he had continued to offer himself for selection. In September 2003 he sustained a broken ankle while playing a pre-season friendly match for Northampton. He did not recover sufficiently from that injury and in February 2004 he announced his retirement from playing rugby. He made 215 appearances for Northampton and scored 46 tries, playing in 104 English Premiership matches.

=== International career ===
Pountney represented England Students and Under-21s but was told that he was too short to play for England's senior team. He qualified for Scotland through a grandmother from the Channel Islands.

He received his first cap for Scotland in November 1998, in an autumn international test match against South Africa. He had played a part in all the team's matches when Scotland won the 1999 Five Nations Championship, where he was a replacement in the first three matches before Jim Telfer selected him in the starting line-up for the match against France in Paris. He was part of the Scotland squad for the 1999 Rugby World Cup, playing in four matches. He scored a try against New Zealand in the quarter-finals, although the All Blacks won the match and brought Scotland's tournament came to an end. In January 2002, returning from injury, he captained Scotland against England in their opening match of the 2002 Six Nations Championship. He made a total of 31 capped appearances for Scotland, scoring five tries. In January 2003 he left Murrayfield in frustration for the last time, after speaking his mind very plainly on the problems he saw there.

== Coaching career ==
Late in 2004 he became head coach of Northampton Saints, together with former England fly-half and teammate Paul Grayson. In July 2005 he became Director of Rugby.

After retiring from top class rugby, he has worked as an independent citing officer, reviewing English Rugby Premiership matches. In the summer of 2013 he became Director of Rugby at Bournemouth RFC who were playing in National Division 2 South. The club announced that he was to leave at the end of the 2014 season, citing a change in personal circumstances.

He then worked as Head of Rugby at Marlborough College and moved to Regent House School in Newtownards in 2017. In 2021 he became development director for Ulster Rugby.
