= Ian Hunter (rugby union) =

England international rugby union player

Ian Hunter (born 15 February 1969 (age 56) in Harrow, London) is a former rugby union footballer who played on the wing or at full back for Northampton Saints and England. He is married with a daughter and works as a managing director of an advertising and marketing agency in Leicester and as a part-time BBC Sport summariser.

He marked the start of his career with impressive try scoring feats (2 on debut and another in his second test) but was controversially dropped from the England side after his 3rd test in favour of Tony Underwood following the 10–9 loss to Wales.

He did not feature regularly for the England side after that but played numerous games for Northampton Saints and was selected for the 1993 British Lions tour to New Zealand. However, injury cruelly struck on the Lions Tour and he was the first player sent home through injury when he dislocated his shoulder in a tackle in the first game against Northland.

His seventh and final appearance for England came against France in the 1995 World Cup.

His shoulder never properly healed enough to stand the demands of top class rugby and he retired from the game in 2001.

Ian was noted throughout his career for being remarkably fit – in 1993 he finished top of the England Squad on the much-vaunted VO2 test.
