= Garry Pagel =

South African rugby union footballer

- Born: Garry Louis Pagel; 17 September 1966 (age 60) King William's Town, Eastern Cape, South Africa
- Height: 1.88 m (6 ft 2 in)
- Weight: 117 kg (258 lb)
- School: Adelaide Gymnasium

Rugby union career
- Position(s): Loosehead prop, tighthead prop
Amateur team(s)
Years	Team	Apps	(Points)
- Crusader–Tech
1992	Villagers RFC		
Senior career
Years	Team	Apps	(Points)
1997–2001	Northampton Saints	77	(50)
Provincial / State sides
Years	Team	Apps	(Points)
1988–1991	Eastern Province	24	
1992–1997	Western Province	87	
International career
Years	Team	Apps	(Points)
1995–1996	South Africa	5	

Garry Louis Pagel (born 17 September 1966) is a former South African rugby union player who played for South Africa between 1995 and 1996.

After retiring from a professional career in rugby, Pagel returned to farming. He resides in the Eastern Cape.

== Career ==
=== Provincial and club ===
Pagel represented North Eastern Cape Schools at the annual Craven Week tournament in 1984 and made his senior provincial debut for Eastern Province in 1988. From 1992 he played for Western Province and was a member of the 1997 Currie Cup winning squad, although he did not play in the final.

In 1997, Pagel moved to England and played for the English side Northampton Saints between 1997 and 2001. He made 77 appearances, scoring 50 points from 10 tries, and played in the side that won the Heineken Cup in 2000.

=== International ===
Pagel played his first test match for the Springboks as a replacement in the opening match of the 1995 Rugby World Cup, on 25 May 1995 against Australia at Newlands in Cape Town. During the World Cup final, he replaced Balie Swart after 68 minutes at tighthead, allowing him to play the rest of the match, including the extra time. After the World Cup, he only played in one further test match for the Springboks. He also played in three tour matches for the Sringboks.

=== Test history ===
World Cup final

No.	Opposition	Result (SA 1st)	Position	Tries	Date	Venue
1.	Australia	27–18	Substitute		25 May 1995	Newlands, Cape Town
2.	Romania	21–8	Loosehead prop		30 May 1995	Newlands, Cape Town
3.	Canada	20–0	Loosehead prop		3 Jun 1995	Boet Erasmus Stadium, Port Elizabeth
4.	New Zealand	15–12	Substitute		24 Jun 1995	Ellis Park, Johannesburg
5.	New Zealand	32–22	Substitute		31 Aug 1996	Ellis Park, Johannesburg

=== World Cup ===
- 1995: World Champions, 4 selections (Wallabies, Romania, Canada, All Blacks).

== Honours ==
With the Springboks

- 1995 World Cup winners

With Western Province

- 1997 Currie Cup winning squad

With Northampton

- 2000 Heineken Cup winners

== See also ==
- List of South Africa national rugby union players – Springbok no. 628
