= Nick Beal =

British Lions & England international rugby union footballer

- Born: Nicholas David Beal; 2 December 1970 (age 55) Howden, East Riding of Yorkshire, England
- Height: 6 ft 2 in (1.88 m)
- Weight: 14 st 10 lb (93 kg)
- School: Royal Grammar School, High Wycombe

Rugby union career
- Position: Fullback
Senior career
Years	Team	Apps	(Points)
1991–2004	Northampton Saints	268	(482)
International career
Years	Team	Apps	(Points)
1996–1999	England	15	(15)
1997	British and Irish Lions		
National sevens team
Years	Team		Comps
1993	England		1993 Sevens World Cup

Nicholas David Beal (born 2 December 1970 in Howden, East Riding of Yorkshire) is a rugby union player who played at Fullback for Northampton Saints, England and the Lions.

== Career ==
=== Club ===
Beal spent his whole professional career at Northampton Saints, and captained the squad that won the Middlesex Sevens trophy in 2003. He missed out on their victory in the 2000 Heineken Cup Final due to injury. He retired in 2004.

=== International ===
Beal was a part of the England team that won the World Sevens title in 1993. He also joined the 1997 British Lions tour to South Africa.

== Personal life ==
Beal is married with two sons. He attended Royal Grammar School, High Wycombe where he was schoolmates with Northampton and England teammate Matt Dawson.

After retiring he worked as a financial advisor. In 2007 he was appointed a non-executive director of the Saints' board.
