= Northampton Saints =

English rugby football club

- Full name: Northampton Rugby Football Club
- Union: East Midlands RFU
- Nickname(s): Saints, Jimmies
- Founded: 1880; 146 years ago
- Location: Northampton, England
- Region: Northamptonshire
- Ground: Franklin's Gardens (Capacity: 15,249)
- Chairman: Ella Bevan
- CEO: Julia Chapman
- Director of Rugby: Phil Dowson
- Captain: Fraser Dingwall
- Most appearances: Ron Jacobs (470)
- Top scorer: Paul Grayson (2,786)
- Most tries: Teddy Cook (219)
- League: PREM Rugby
- 2025–26: 1st of 10 (champions in play-offs)
| 1st kit | 2nd kit |

Official website
- northamptonsaints.co.uk

Northampton Saints (officially Northampton Rugby Football Club) is a professional rugby union club from Northampton, England. The club plays in the Gallagher PREM, England's top division of rugby union.

It was formed in 1880 as "Northampton St. James", which gave it the nickname Saints from the 1880s. The team plays its home games at the 15,249 capacity Franklin's Gardens, in the St James area in the west of the town. Since the early 1900s, the team has played in black, green and gold colours.

At the conclusion of the 2025–26 Premiership Rugby season, Saints finished top of the league and won the Premiership final against Exeter Chiefs, giving them their second title in three years and third overall success in the competition. Additionally they have qualified to compete in the 2026–27 European Rugby Champions Cup.

The current director of rugby is Phil Dowson, who was promoted to director of rugby in the summer of 2022.

To date, Saints have won eight major titles. They were European Champions in 2000, and English Champions in 2014, 2024 and 2026. They have also won the secondary European Rugby Challenge Cup twice, in 2009 and 2014, the Anglo-Welsh Cup in 2010, and the inaugural Premiership Rugby Cup in 2019.

Additionally, the Saints have won the Second Division title three times; in 1990, 1996 and 2008.

The Saints' biggest rivals are Leicester Tigers. The East Midlands Derby is one of the fiercest rivalries in English rugby union.

== History ==
=== Early years (1880–1945) ===
==== Establishment and development ====
The club was established in 1880 under the original title of Northampton St. James by Rev Samuel Wathen Wigg, a local clergyman and curate of St James' Church, who was a resident of the nearby village of Milton Malsor in the house known as "Mortimers". This is how the club got its two nicknames of "The Saints" or "Jimmies". Wigg had played rugby football for around 18 months between 1878 and 1880, and the game had already been played on an informal basis in the town and the county for around 17 years. His original concept was to promote "order" amongst his younger parish members by creating an "improvement class" for troubled local boys.

The first "official" game is considered to have been played against a local team, the Star from Bailiff Street, just off Northampton Racecourse. The early days saw games against teams from Northampton such as All Saints, St Michael's, Scorpions, Northampton Rugby Club, the Wanderers, and, in contrast to Saints' working-class roots, the predominantly upper-class Northampton Unity Football Club, who later offered to merge with Saints (though this was refused by the St James' governing board).

"Play the game as a sportsman should, remember that life is but a span, it's up to us to be cheerful and good, and make life as bright as we can"

— Rev. Samuel Wathen Wigg, speech given to the club in 1927

It was not long before Northampton had one of the major rugby union teams in the country. By the 1896–97 season they had conceded only 93 points and kept their opposition scoreless for 17 of that season's 22 games. In 1900, twenty years after its establishment, local farmer Harry Weston was the first Saints player to be awarded an England cap. The club was also drawing crowds of around 10,000 for major games, especially those against Leicester.

==== Relationships with other clubs in town ====
A minor disagreement occurred in 1897 as Saints looked to drop the "St. James" part of their name to become "Northampton Football Club", because the recently formed association football club Northampton Town FC, known as the Cobblers, also wished to assume this name. In the end, after some negotiation from RFU chairman George Rowland Hill, the Cobblers were willing to cede the name to Saints.

Saints formed an early relationship with Northampton Cricket Club, after donating all ticket proceedings from their 1897 game against Portsmouth RFC to the cricket club. They followed this up with a similar gesture in 1899 after a game against Bedford.

==== Original All Blacks tour ====
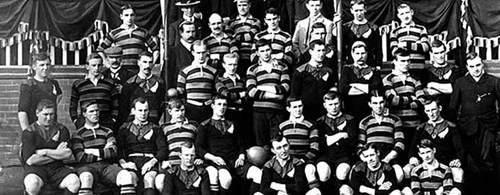
The Northampton Saints with The Original All Blacks in 1905

In 1905, Saints hosted the touring Original All Blacks at the Northampton Ground on 28 September, losing 32–0 in front of around 6,500 spectators. The visitors pulled away after a competitive start, but the match became part of club lore: a third gold stripe was added to the shirt to commemorate the occasion, creating the iconic black, green and gold hoops still used today. For a full breakdown of this match and other encounters against international touring sides, see Northampton Saints matches against international teams.

==== Edgar Mobbs ====
In 1908, eight years after Harry Weston's first England cap, Edgar Mobbs made his debut. Edgar was a hero throughout Northampton and in Bedford after also representing Beford several times. A victim of the RFU's witch-hunting post Great Schism he was accused of "professionalism" in 1907 and tried by the RFU, alongside several other players, all of whom were acquitted. He was the first Northampton player to captain his country but is best remembered for his exploits in World War I. After being turned down as too old to join up, Edgar raised his own "Sportsman's" battalion otherwise known as Mobbs Own. He was killed on 29 July 1917 leading his battalion over the top while kicking a rugby ball into no man's land to attack a machine gun post. His body was never recovered. Thousands turned out to see his monument unveiled in Northampton's Market Square.

The club arranged the Mobbs Memorial Match in 1921 as a tribute. It was played every year between the Barbarians and East Midlands at Franklin's Gardens until the Barbarians withdrew their support in 2008. The match was saved by the efforts of former Northampton player Bob Taylor and former Northampton chairman Keith Barwell, and since 2012 it has been played alternately at Bedford Blues' Goldington Road ground and Franklin's Gardens, with the host club facing the British Army team. From 2024 the match has been played as a preseason game between Bedford and Northampton.

=== Postwar Period ===
In this period, the Saints continued to grow and produced several future England captains. They were one of the driving forces in the English game for the next 60 years, but hard times were ahead.

=== 1988 Revolution ===
The club failed to keep pace with developments in the game and top players were no longer attracted to the Gardens, where a 'them and us' mentality had built up between the players and those in charge. A few former players formed their own task force, which swept out the "old brigade" in the 1988 'Saints Revolution' and put a plan into action that would put the club back at the top of the English game.

=== Return to Normality ===
With Barrie Corless as director of rugby, the club set about restructuring and soon the Saints were back on the way up, helped by the signing of All Blacks legend Buck Shelford.

In 1990, Northampton Rugby Union Football Club gained promotion to the First Division and the following year made their first trip to Twickenham to play Quins in the Pilkington Cup Final. They lost in extra time but the foundations of a good Saints line-up began to show in the following few seasons.

Tim Rodber and Ian Hunter forced their way into the England setup while younger players such as Paul Grayson, Matt Dawson and Nick Beal came through the ranks and would follow the duo into the England senior team.

In 1994 Ian McGeechan took over as director of rugby, and although the club were relegated in his first season, they returned in style the next season, winning every match of their campaign and averaging 50 points a game. This season was referred to by fans of the club as the "Demolition Tour of Division Two".

=== Professional era ===
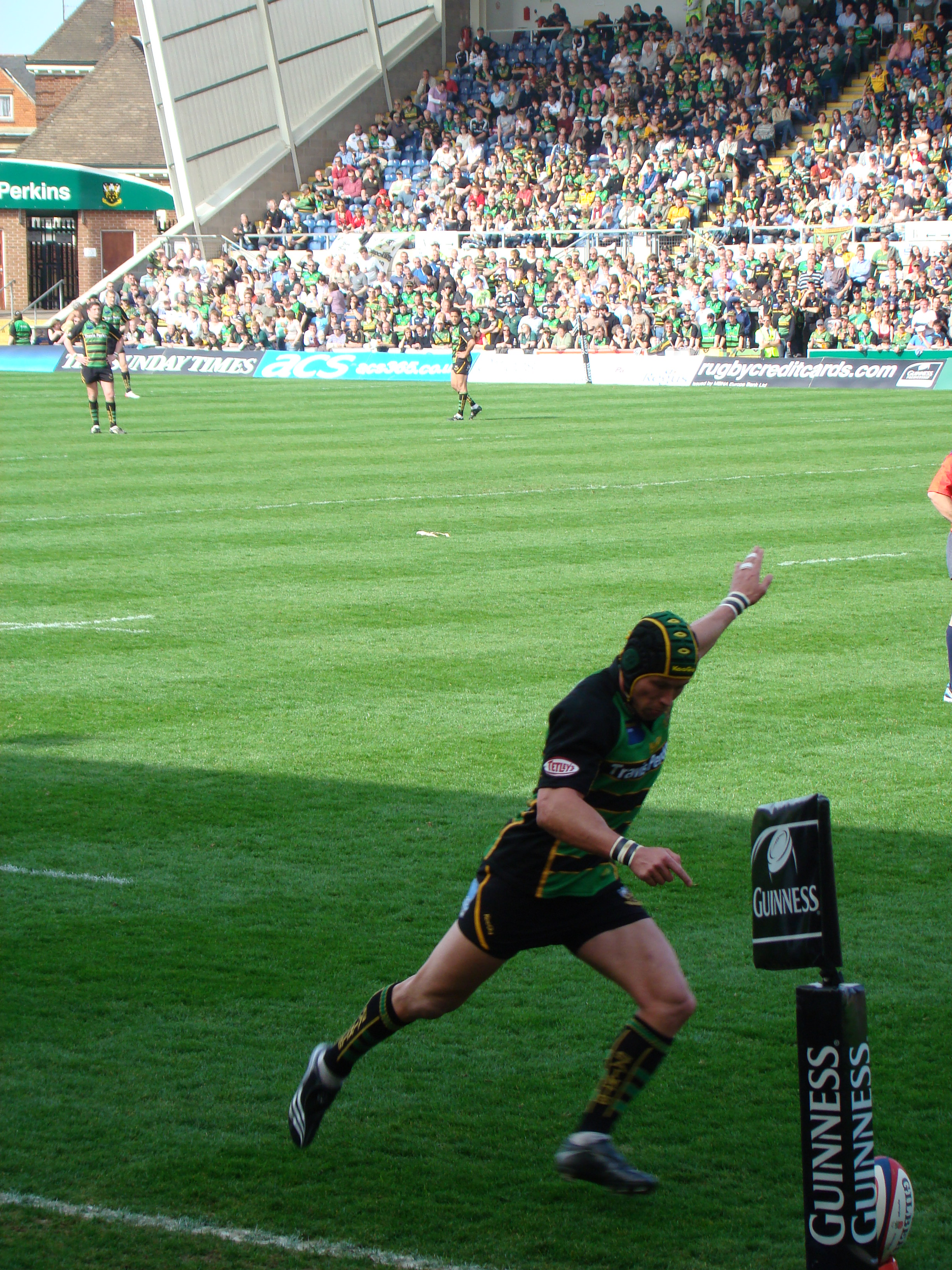
Bruce Reihana in 2008.

In 1995, rugby union turned professional and the club was taken over by local businessman Keith Barwell.

In 1999, Saints became runners-up in the Allied Dunbar Premiership, their league campaign climaxing with a crucial home local derby against eventual winners Leicester Tigers, which they lost 15–22. Ian McGeechan had left the club at the end of the previous season to return to coach Scotland, and was replaced by former Saints player John Steele who had done well on a limited budget while working for London Scottish. Steele relied on the foundations laid by McGeechan, as well as the inspirational captaincy of Samoan Pat Lam to lead the club to European success the following season.

In 1999–2000, the club became a Public Limited Company (plc) and shares were issued to the public; in this season the Saints lost in the Tetley's Bitter Cup Final to Wasps, but beat Munster 9–8 in the European Cup Final to win their first major trophy.

After a poor start to the 2001–2002 season, former All-Black coach Wayne Smith was appointed as head coach. He went on to transform the club in five short months. A team that looked down and out in November were moulded into a side that reached the Powergen Cup final and again qualified for the Heineken Cup. Travis Perkins became the club's main sponsor in 2001.

The club narrowly survived relegation from the Premiership after coach Alan Solomons was sacked in the middle of the 2004–05 season. The coaching role was passed onto the former first teammates Budge Pountney and Paul Grayson. They had a slow start to the 2005–06 season, but continued mainly unbeaten after the New Year. Pountney retired at the start of the 2006–07 season leaving Grayson in overall control.

The Saints competed for the 2006–07 Heineken Cup, finishing second in their pool behind Biarritz Olympique, the runners-up from the previous season. Northampton qualified for the quarter-finals and met Biarritz in Spain. Despite being at the bottom of the English league, they defeated the French champions 7–6 to advance to the semi-finals.

=== Relegation (2007–08) ===
On 28 April 2007, despite a 27–22 victory over London Irish at Franklin's Gardens, Northampton were relegated from the English Premiership. A "behind the scenes" restructure led to the brief appointment of Peter Sloane as head coach from the role of forwards coach. Paul Grayson became the skills and backs coach. England Saxons coach Jim Mallinder became the new head coach and director of rugby, with his assistant Dorian West following as assistant coach.

On 22 March 2008, Northampton beat Exeter Chiefs to ensure their promotion and a return to the Guinness Premiership. On 12 April 2008, Northampton beat Exeter Chiefs 24–13 at Twickenham Stadium to win the EDF Energy Trophy. On 26 April 2008 they ended their National Division One season undefeated with 30 wins from 30 games.

=== Return to Premiership (2008–2014) ===
In the 2008–09 season, the Saints finished eighth, losing only one game at home to Newcastle Falcons. They also lifted the European Challenge Cup, defeating French side Bourgoin 15–3 in the final on 22 May 2009 at The Stoop. The victory gave them a place in the 2009–10 Heineken Cup.

In March 2010, the Saints won the Anglo-Welsh Cup final against Gloucester 30–24, gaining them their fourth piece of silverware in three years and a place in the following season's Heineken Cup. They also finished second in the English Premiership, losing to Saracens 19–21 in the semi-final at Franklin's Gardens, and progressed as far as the quarter-finals of the Heineken Cup, losing to Munster at Thomond Park, Limerick.

Northampton finished fourth in the 2010–11 English Premiership, losing to Leicester in the semi-final. Saints also went undefeated into the final of the Heineken Cup, where they were beaten by Leinster 33–22, at the Millennium Stadium.

At the beginning of the 2011–12 season, with nine players away at the 2011 Rugby World Cup in New Zealand, Saints were knocked out of the 2011–12 Heineken Cup by Muster at Stadium MK. When the international players returned, Saints began to move up the table. England picked eight Saints players out of a squad of 32 to represent England, meaning that over a quarter of the England team were Saints – a new club record for the number of players selected for a single England squad. In 2011–12, the Saints reached a third successive Premiership semi-final and a second Anglo-Welsh Cup final in three seasons.

After winning their first five matches of 2012–13, Saints exited both the Anglo-Welsh and Heineken Cups, despite ending Ulster's four-year unbeaten home European record just before Christmas 2012. The team finished fourth in the league, and after beating Saracens in the semi-final reached their first ever Premiership final, where they lost 37–17 to Leicester. The 2013 season finished with seven players being taken to Argentina as part of the England squad, including Tom Wood as captain.

In the 2013–14 season, the club finished second in the league behind Saracens with a total of 78 points, but went on to win the 2013–14 English Premiership, defeating table-topping Saracens 24–20 after 100 minutes of rugby due to extra time. They also reached the final of the 2013–14 European Challenge Cup, which they won by beating Bath 16–30 at Cardiff Arms Park in Wales.

=== 2014–2018 ===
Following what was arguably the most successful season in the club's history, the Saints finished atop of the Rugby Premiership with 76 points. However, they were undone in the 2014–15 Premiership Rugby semi-finals, losing 24–29 to Saracens on 23 May 2015.

A couple of disappointing seasons followed, with results leading to stagnation, and on 12 December 2017 director of rugby Jim Mallinder was released from the club after more than 10 years. On 29 December 2017, Australian coach Alan Gaffney joined the club on an interim basis until the end of the 2017–18 Premiership Rugby campaign, to work alongside Alan Dickens at the helm. The team finished 9th overall that year with a points tally of 43, but avoided relegation and confirmed their place in the 2018–19 Premiership Rugby season.

=== 2018–2024 ===
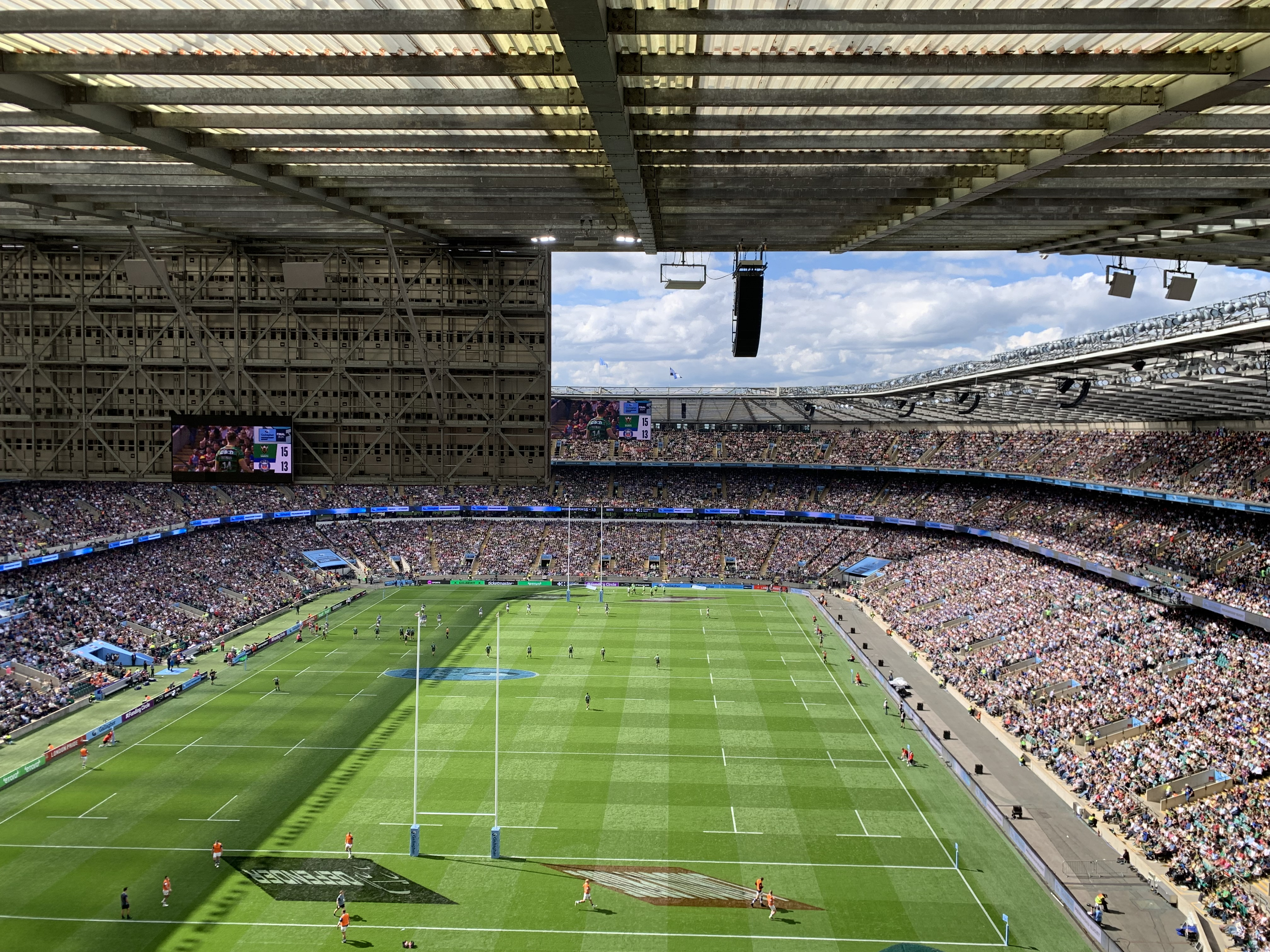
The 2024 Gallagher Premiership final was attended by around 35,000 Northampton Saints fans, equivalent to roughly one tenth of the entire population of Northampton.

A new era was confirmed when it was announced on 29 January 2018 that Hurricanes boss Chris Boyd would link up with Saints for the 2018–19 Premiership Rugby campaign. The announcement was a coup for the club, due to the coach's high profile and success in Southern Hemisphere Rugby, which included the 2016 Super Rugby title with the Hurricanes. In Boyd's first season the Saints would go on to lift the Premiership Rugby Cup, defeating Saracens 23–9 in front of a home-final crowd on 17 March 2019. The Saints also secured a top 4 finish for the first time since 2015, and went on to face Exeter Chiefs in the Premiership Rugby semi-final play-offs.

=== 2023–present ===
After a hotly contested regular season, which saw Saints finish top of the table, only finishing ahead of Bath on points difference, they faced a renewed Saracens side in a home semi final. Saints won 22–20 after a strong performance. This match was the final home appearance of Courtney Lawes.

The final was set to take place on 8 June against a strong Bath squad. After a reasonably dominant first half, seeing the side 15–10 up, the game evened out at 18-18. Following a handful of penalties and tries, and a well managed defensive set by Northampton, the game finished 24–21 in favour of Saints.

This was their second league win, 10 years after their first in 2014. A parade was organised for the following day and thousands of supporters attended. Roads were shut and the route went from Franklin's Gardens to Northampton Guildhall.

Following a successful run in the pool stage in the 2024–25 European Rugby Champions Cup, Saints faced a pair of knockout matches against ASM Clermont Auvergne and Castres Olympique. After comfortably winning both, they faced an intimidating Leinster side away in Dublin, in a repeat of the previous year's semi-final, which saw Saints knocked out in a close game. Saints ultimately went on to win in a stunning 34–37 victory, which sends them to their third ever European final on the 25th May in Cardiff, against a renewed Union Bordeaux Bègles side.

In the final, Saints struggled to contain the flair and star quality of Bordeaux, with French scrum-half Maxime Lucu putting in a player of the match performance to guide his team to the first top-flight European victory in their history. The final score was 28–20.

== Club culture and identity ==
=== Crest ===
Throughout the 1950s a new crest was designed and granted to the club by The Heraldry Society. This new crest was effectively a modified version of the coat of arms of Northampton. This new crest was used on all important documents as well as on jackets, training shirts and other pieces of formal wear, though was not included on a match shirt until 1984.

There were two minor changes to the crest that occurred in 1996 and 2016 respectively. Firstly in 1996 the text below the crest was changed to say "Northampton Rugby Football Club", as opposed to the previous "Northampton Football Club" (which is still the legal name of the club to this day). Secondly in 2016 this text was further changed to say "Northampton Saints" instead.

A new crest was revealed on the 11th July 2024, with the original 1880 cross being placed in the centre of a similarly shaped shield. The change was considered controversial by some Saints fans, but supported by others.

=== Playing Kit and Colours ===
Saints originally played in a scarlet kit, which was then changed to a black and green kit with no crest, with a simple cross being added at some time before 1884 (the same cross that now forms the basis of the new 2024 crest). This cross was removed from the shirts at some point between then and 1904 and the final, gold stripe was added that year after Saints played the Original All Blacks. These colours would form the design of every home kit since.

In 2008, after being promoted from the championship to the premiership, Saints changed their kit suppliers from Kooga to Rhino. After two years with Rhino Saints switched again to Burrda Sport, a Swiss sports apparel company. Northampton signed a four-year deal with Burrda that brought back the traditional ring design with a modern twist. In the 2014–15 season Burrda released a kit with horizontal green, black and gold stripes of the same size. This was one of the most popular kit releases in Saints' history. In the 2016–17 season Macron became Saints' kit supplier, signing a 10-year deal with the club. For the 2021–2022 season the club released an away shirt bearing the names of those season-ticket holders who donated their ticket to the club during the coronavirus epidemic.

In 2001 a commemorative home shirt was produced with a "Champions of Europe" badge following Saints' victory against Munster in the final.

In 2021 Saints released a limited edition shirt to mark the 20th anniversary of their partnership with Travis Perkins.

The current kit is supplied by Macron. On the front centre of the shirt is Cinch while GRS appears on the left and right of the collar. The shoe company Church's appears on the left sleeve. On the right sleeve, the logo of the tournament varies between matches. Below it is the Rugby Against Racism logo. On the back of the shirt Cinch appears above the player's name and number. Cinch is also at the top on the back of the match day shorts.

Away and cup kits

Saints first away shirt came in 1990 and was white, green and gold, essentially a home shirt with the black replaced with white. To this day this is the most commonly used design format for the club's away shirts, though many other designs have been used since. The following years saw this pattern repeated until 1996 when a mainly black kit with small gold and green stripes was used as an away shirt. in the 1999–2000 season, an away kit was rarely used and took the form of either a solid black or dark green shirt. The seasons following saw a return to the mainly black strip until 2005 when a white shirt with small green and gold stripes was used again, with this being repeated as the away design until 2012 when a sky blue shirt was used. The following year a neon green away shirt was used, with this design lasting two years and seeing usage in the Saints' first Premiership title win. An all grey strip was used in 2016 for the first time, with this design returning in 2019. In 2017 another neon green away strip was worn and 2018 a claret shirt was worn as a homage to the county's colours. Finally the classic white returned for 2020 and 2023 and were interspersed by a grey kit in 2021 and a pink kit in 2022 respectively. For 2024 a light grey/ white shirt with no gold was used as an away strip.

Cup/third shirts have been used intermittently by the club, perhaps most famously the hastily designed cup shirt used in the 2002 Powergen Cup final against London Irish, after it became apparent that a kit clash would be inevitable with both the home or away jerseys, with the "third" shirt being a training kit. Third kits since then have varied in colours, with yellow, black, and red all being used from time to time.

Uniform suppliers

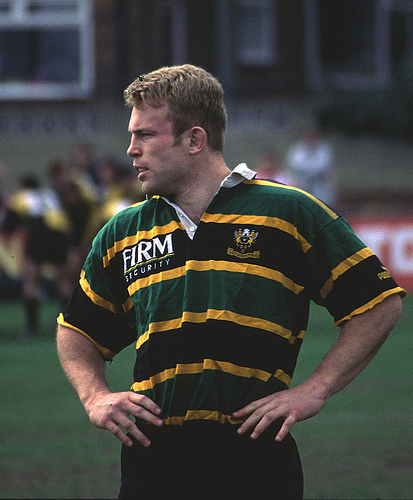
Tim Rodber in the 1995 home shirt

| Period | Kit Manufacturer | Main Sponsor |
|---|---|---|
| 1970s–1988 | Europa Sports | no sponsor |
| 1988-1989 | Five D Togs | no sponsor |
| 1989–1993 | Cotton Oxford | Carlsberg |
| 1993–1995 | Puma | Carlsberg |
| 1995–1996 | Puma | Firm Security |
| 1996–1998 | Cotton Traders | Firm Security |
| 1998–2000 | Cotton Traders | Tetley's |
| 2000–2001 | Canterbury | Tetley's |
| 2001–2002 | Canterbury | Travis Perkins |
| 2002–2007 | KooGa | Travis Perkins |
| 2007–2010 | Rhino Rugby | Travis Perkins |
| 2010–2015 | Burrda Sports | Travis Perkins |
| 2015–2017 | Macron | Travis Perkins |
| 2017–2020 | Macron | Toolstation |
| 2020–2023 | Macron | Travis Perkins |
| 2023–2026 | Macron | Cinch |

Notes
1.When Saints played away against Grenoble in 1999, they were not allowed to use Tetley's as a sponsor due to French alcohol advertising laws, and so they played using a standard home strip with the Tetley's logos removed from the stomach and collar, replacing the stomach logo with a "Smoothly does it" text piece (a slogan associated with the brewery).

=== Rivalries ===
Saints' main rivals are Leicester Tigers, whom they face in the East Midlands Derby. Over a number of recent years, the Saints have developed a rivalry with Saracens, largely due to the increased number of fixtures the two teams have performed against one another in, the most notable fixture being the 2013–14 Premiership Rugby Final, in which the Saints ran out victors. The rivalry with Saracens died down somewhat following Saracens' relegation after their Salary Cap Scandal and Saracens' subsequent relegation, but this rivalry has been rekindled somewhat since Saracens' re-admittance to the Premiership. Saints also had a mild rivalry with Wasps during their time in Coventry, but this second Midlands Derby was usually seen as less important to fans of the club.

=== Songs and chants ===
There are several songs tied to the club and chants are usually started in the terraced area of the Carlsberg Stand. Saints' main club song is When the Saints Go Marching In, and is frequently sung by supporters. Unlike other sports teams that use this song, it is usually sung quicker by Saints fans, at around 140BPM, for its entire duration. Another frequently used song amongst the crowd in recent years has been "The Fields Are Green", a song that has had connotations with the town and more specifically the Football Club for decades. Dowson introduced the song to the Saints players in 2022 and since then the song that was already known by many supporters begun to be sung in the stands too. This formed part of a wider push for a stronger, more local identity amongst the players.

Chants of "Come on you Saints" and "Jimmies" (from Saint James) have been used for a long time by the club's supporters, though the latter has fallen out of use somewhat over the last decade. More recently, alongside the singing of "The Fields Are Green", the chants of "Shoe Army" can be heard amongst the crowds, a nickname of the football club that has also recently been adopted by the Saints and relates to the town's shoemaking history. Supporters have also been seen removing their shoes during this chant.

=== Shoe Army ===
Northampton Saints’ supporters are collectively known as the ‘’‘Shoe Army’’’, a nickname reflecting Northampton's long-standing association with the British boot and shoe industry. The name derives from the town's centuries-old shoemaking heritage, for which Northampton became internationally renowned, and mirrors the identity of the town's association football club, Northampton Town F.C., whose supporters are also known as the ‘‘Shoe Army’’ owing to the club's nickname, ‘‘the Cobblers’’.

The term became increasingly associated with Northampton Saints during the early 2020s as part of a wider effort to strengthen the club's connection with the town and its heritage. Under director of rugby Phil Dowson, players adopted local traditions and introduced ‘‘The Fields Are Green’’ as a post-match victory song in 2022. The song concludes with repeated chants of “Shoe Army”, with players and supporters often removing and raising a shoe in recognition of Northampton's shoemaking history.

Following the club's Premiership Rugby title-winning campaign in 2023–24, the song and accompanying chant gained widespread recognition. It featured prominently during the team's victory celebrations, including the open-top bus parade through Northampton, and has since become a regular part of post-match celebrations shared by both players and supporters. Alongside ‘‘When the Saints Go Marching In’’, ‘‘The Fields Are Green’’ has become one of the songs most closely associated with the club's modern identity.

=== Identity among players ===
There have been several initiatives from coaches throughout Saints' history for a clearer identity amongst the players. Perhaps the most famous was by Wayne Smith, who not only ordered the purchase of the "punishment car" in the 2003 season, a Reliant Rialto painted in the club's colours, but also introduced a "player of the week" training shirt (an away shirt with a large Superman logo stitched onto the chest) as a reward for players receiving Man of the Match.

Coach Phil Dowson pushed for a new identity amongst the players which emphasised the club's connection to Northampton and its history. Players have been encouraged to sing songs about the town's shoemaking history, with many of these cultural changes appearing to be due to Dowson's admiration for the culture of the local football club.

=== Other Club symbols ===
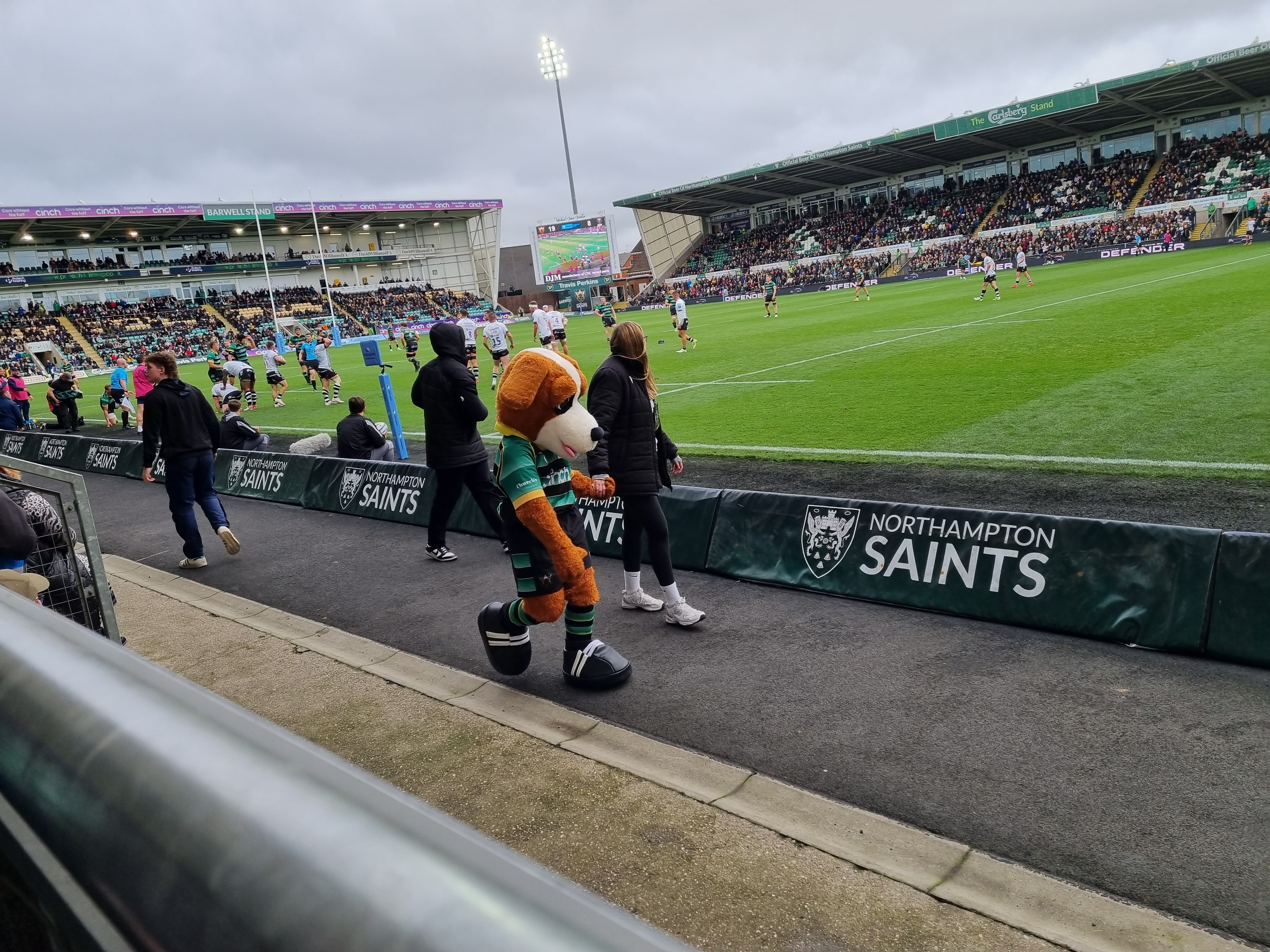
Bernie during the 2023–2024 season.

The Stickman

The Saints' Stickman is a club symbol that has been in use since at least the 1980s. The Stickman has a halo and is often depicted carrying a rugby ball. Why the club started to use this character is unclear, but its origins lie in books written and illustrated by Leslie Charteris. The club sells merchandise carrying the Stickman's likeness; the most popular of these is a car decal which can be seen on many vehicles in Northampton.

Bernie

Bernie, the club's mascot, is an anthropomorphic Saint Bernard dog that can be seen at home games. He has been a symbol of the club since at least 1999 and his design has remained the same, with only his shirt changing every season.

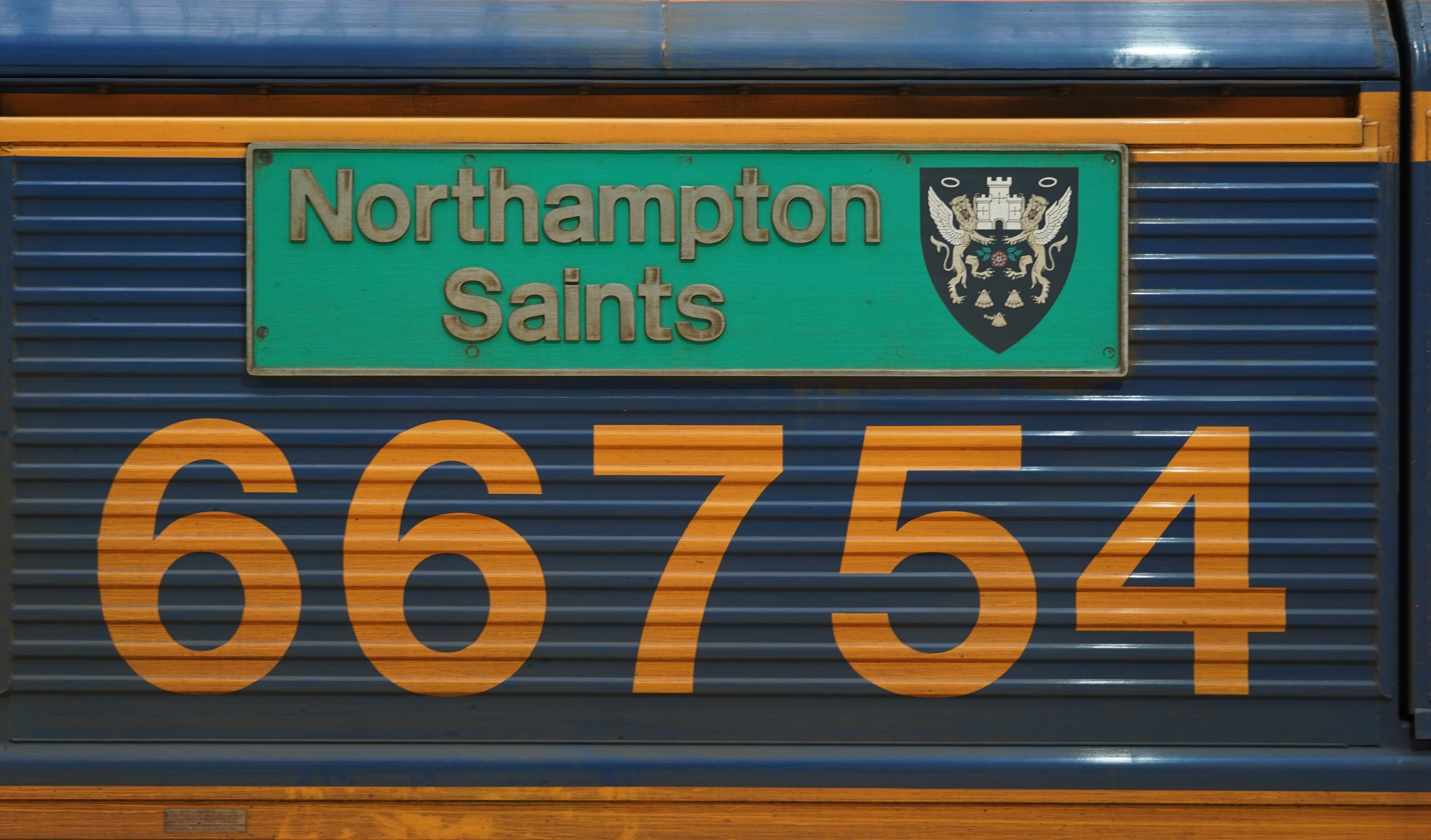
the nameplate was unveiled at Wellingborough Rail Yard in April 2015

Freight locomotive

In 2015 it was announced that GB Railfreight 66754, a Class 66 mainline freight locomotive, would be named "Northampton Saints" in honour of the previous year's Premiership title. Saints became the first rugby team to have a train named after it.

=== In the community ===
Participation and youth events

Saints are active in the local community, with much engagement being carried out at the junior level. Players carry out junior training sessions amongst the twenty or so clubs in the county. The annual Saints' training camp takes place at Stowe School. Other locations have been used for smaller junior training camps, such as the training pitches at Franklins Gardens.

The Northampton Saints' Supporters' Club

The Supporters' Club was founded in 1922 with the objective of representing Saints' fans and helping to make their voices heard. The Club aims to support local clubs in the area and to increase attendances both at home and away. They meet for social events and organise coach travel to away games.

The Northampton Saints' Foundation

The Foundation has its roots in the organised educational activities carried out by the club in the county, with the concept of supporting local young people being one of the main factors in the club's creation in 1880. The Foundation was created in 2018 and has provided many opportunities for young people. Most is centred around educating young people about employability, life skills and interpersonal development.

The second pillar of the Foundation is the preservation of history the club's history, undertaking educational seminars about the club. The organisation is also responsible for researching and reporting on the club's history.

The Parish

The Parish is a community initiative set up by the club to support the local area by providing a number of benefits and exclusive offers to people who live within a certain distance of the ground.

Local business relations

Many businesses in the town can be seen sporting Saints' flags and colours, and many bars and pubs in the town show Saints' memorabilia. In 2024 the Northampton Saints Business Club was created to form strong relationships with local businesses to encourage growth in the local economy.

== Stadiums and facilities ==
=== Franklins Gardens ===
Franklin's Gardens has a seated capacity of 15,249 and is arranged into four permanent stands: the Barwell Stand to the west, the Church's Stand to the east, the Cinch Stand to the north and the South Stand. All stands are covered and provide seating, hospitality areas and spectator amenities.

The stadium is equipped with modern floodlighting, two large video screens, a public address system and extensive food and beverage concessions. Accessible seating, wheelchair spaces, accessible toilets and step-free access are provided throughout the ground.

The playing surface is a hybrid grass pitch reinforced with synthetic fibres, allowing for improved durability and year-round use. The pitch is served by an undersoil heating and drainage system to maintain playing conditions during adverse weather.

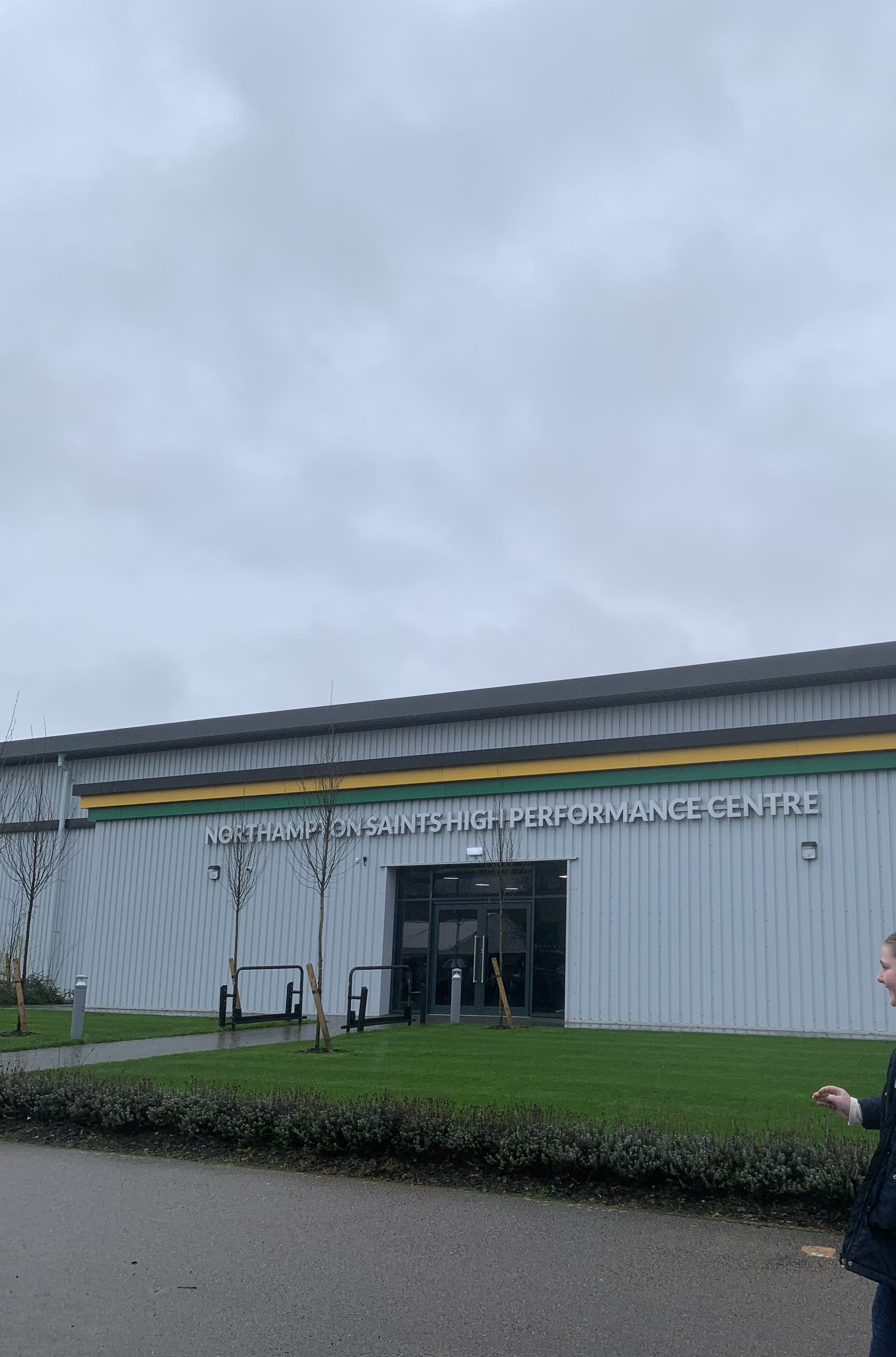
The exterior of Northampton Saints' High Performance Training Centre

In 2023 the club opened the Northampton Saints' High Performance Centre, on the opposite side of the Village to the stadium. This is designed as somewhere indoors to train and was partially driven by the advantages that sports teams gain from having a training area that can be used at any time, even in extreme weather. The pitch has artificial grass. It was built on the previous main training pitch at the rear of the stadium and features changing facilities as well as a half-sized training pitch. There are two further outdoor training pitches that are used for games by youth players and the second team, as well as for hosting youth rugby tournaments.

The Club Shop was acquired in the 1990s and was previously a nightclub/ bar. It is located to the north of the stadium and opens onto the main road (A4500) and sells replicas of all kits, accessories and other fashion items. The main ticket office is located to the rear of the shop.

The stadium has six car parks, with space for 1,500 cars. The main car parks are located next to the outdoor training pitches and were constructed in 2005, opposite the car parks used by Football Club. Executive parking is just outside the stadium next to the Carlsberg Stand.

=== Stadium MK ===
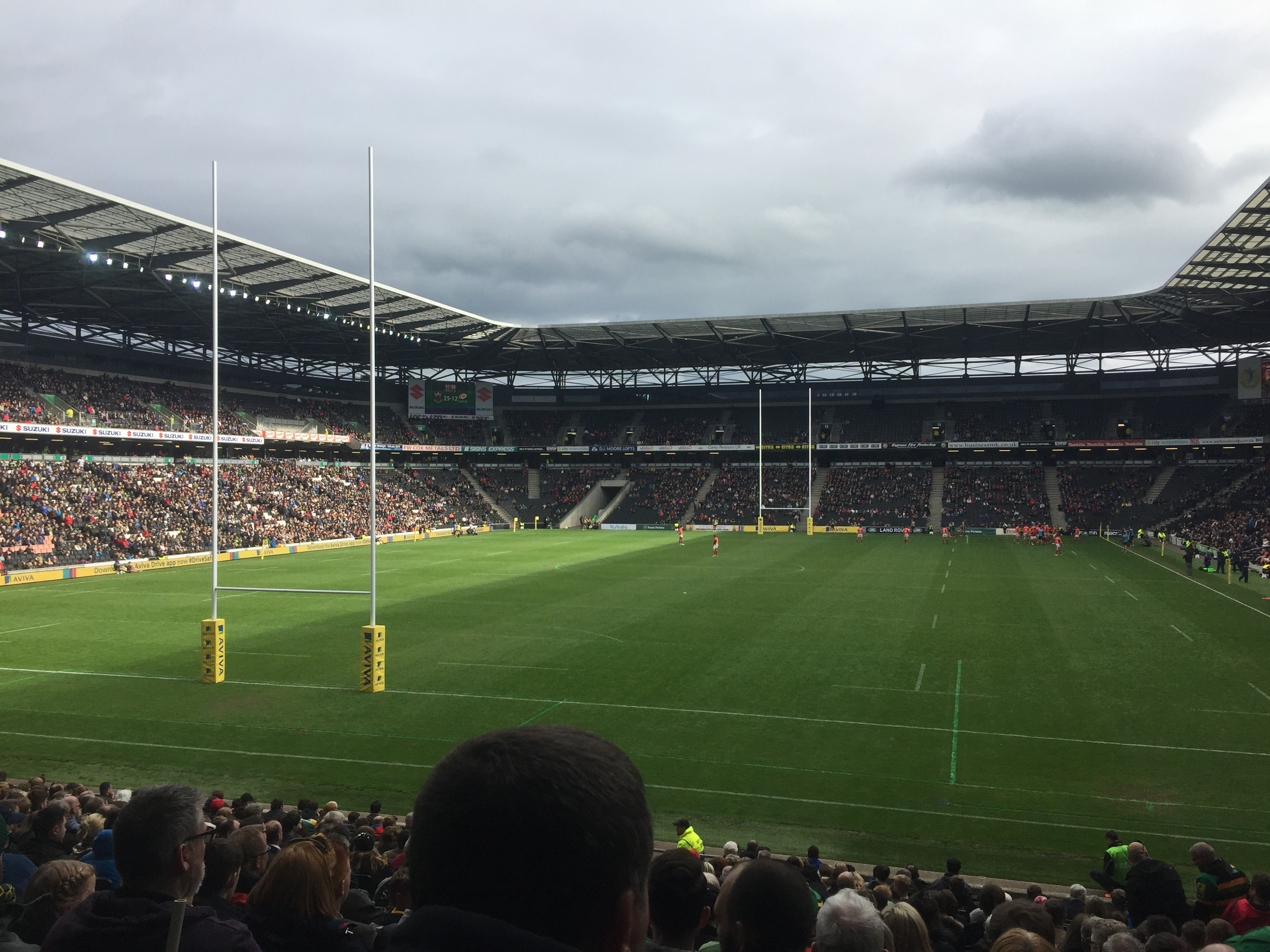
Northampton Saints' Final Game at the Stadium MK, in 2017

The club played a 2011 Heineken Cup quarter final match against Ulster at Stadium MK in Milton Keynes, because Franklin's Gardens was too small to meet the minimum 15,000 seats demanded by the European Rugby Cup organisers. Saints won the match, beating Ulster 23–13, witnessed by a crowd of over 21,000.

Saints also played their semi-final there the same year, beating Perpignan 23–7. Saints then hosted one Premiership match a season at the stadium between 2014–15 and 2016–17. After this, it was deemed not commercially viable for the club to continue playing at the Stadium MK and no further games have since taken place here.

=== Mill Lane ===
The club's first home was on Mill Lane, to the south of Franklin's Gardens. Saints played games on this pitch from 1880 until their permanent move to Franklin's Gardens in 1894.

=== County Ground ===
Northampton Saints played a number of games at the County Ground in the early 1900s, as well as using the venue to host important games such as the East Midlands vs All Blacks game in 1924.

== Club partnerships ==
=== Bedford Blues ===
Saints announced that for the 2020–2021 Championship and Premiership season, several players would be made available for the Bedford Blues as part of a wider strategic partnership. Both clubs already had a close relationship due to proximity, shared history, frequent friendly games being played and similar business models.

The agreement cemented the playing of an annual pre-season match between the two clubs, as well as the exchange of coaching staff.

=== Loughborough Lightning ===
In 2021, Saints announced a partnership with the Loughborough University Women's Rugby Team who play in Premiership Women's Rugby, the top women's rugby competition in England. The agreement included several Lightning games being played in Northampton, as well as the Northampton Saints' badge appearing on their shirt. Furthermore, the team is provided with a special kit in Saints colours for the games played in Northampton.

== Honours and achievements ==
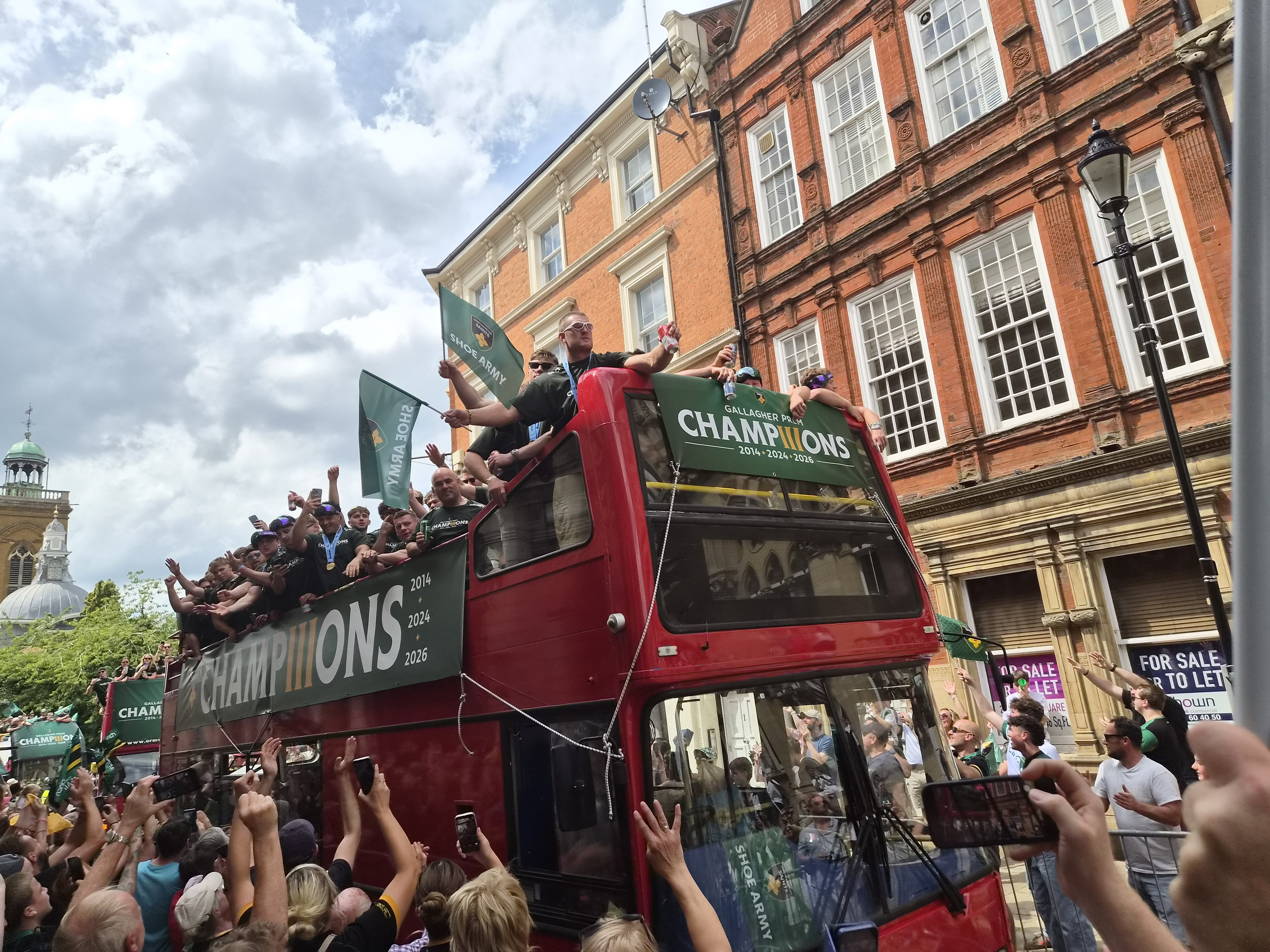
Northampton Saints team during Premiership Rugby victory parade in Northampton, 2026

- European Rugby Champions Cup
  - Champions (1) – 1999–00
  - Runners-up (2) – 2010–11, 2024–25
- European Challenge Cup
  - Champions (2) – 2008–09, 2013–14
- Premiership Rugby
  - Champions (3) – 2013–14, 2023–24, 2025–26
  - Runners-up (2) – 1998–99, 2012–13
- RFU Championship
  - Champions (3) – 1989–90, 1995–96, 2007–08
- Premiership Rugby Cup
  - Champions (1) – 2018–19
- Anglo-Welsh Cup
  - Champions (1) – 2009–10
  - Runners-up (2) – 2011–12, 2013–14
- RFU Knockout Cup
  - Runners-up (4) – 1990–91, 1999–00, 2001–02, 2002–03
- EDF Energy Trophy
  - Champions (1) – 2007–08
- Selkirk Sevens
  - Champions (2) – 1991, 1993
- Middlesex Sevens
  - Champions (1) – 2003

=== Northampton Wanderers (reserves) ===
- Premiership Rugby Shield
  - Champions (3) – 2008–09, 2016–17, 2017–18
  - Runners-up (4) – 2003–04, 2007–08, 2013–14, 2015–16

== Current squad ==
The Northampton Saints squad for the 2026–27 season is:

Northampton Saints 2026–27 Premiership Rugby squad
| **Props**: (England) **Trevor Davison**; (South Africa) Jordan Els; (Italy) **Danilo Fischetti**; (England) Luke Green; (England) **Emmanuel Iyogun**; (Zimbabwe) **Cleopas Kundiona**; (Italy) **Ion Neculai**; (South Africa) Lefty Zigiriadis; **Hookers**: (England) Ben Alexander; (England) **Curtis Langdon**; (Scotland) **Robbie Smith**; (England) Henry Walker; (England) Craig Wright; **Locks**: (England) James Bennett; (England) **Alex Coles** (Note: Alex Coles is jointly contracted with the RFU, via an enhanced England Elite Player Squad (EPS) contract.); (England) Tom Lockett; (England) Chunya Munga; (England) Ed Prowse; (South Africa) JJ van der Mescht | **Back row**: (England) Archie Benson; (England) **Callum Chick**; (Australia) **Josh Kemeny**; (England) **Tom Pearson**; (England) **Henry Pollock** (Note: Henry Pollock is jointly contracted with the RFU, via an enhanced England Elite Player Squad (EPS) contract.); (Scotland) Josh Taylor; **Scrum-halves**: (England) **Archie McParland**; (England) **Alex Mitchell** (Note: Alex Mitchell is jointly contracted with the RFU, via an enhanced England Elite Player Squad (EPS) contract.); **Fly-halves**: (France) **Anthony Belleau**; (England) **Fin Smith** (Note: Fin Smith is jointly contracted with the RFU, via an enhanced England Elite Player Squad (EPS) contract.) | **Centres**: (England) **Fraser Dingwall** **(c)**; (Scotland) **Rory Hutchinson**; (England) Tom Litchfield; (England) Toby Thame; **Wings**: (Scotland) Amena Caqusau; (Italy) **Malik Faissal**; (England) **Tommy Freeman** (Note: Tommy Freeman is jointly contracted with the RFU, via an enhanced England Elite Player Squad (EPS) contract.); (England) James Martin; (England) **Ollie Sleightholme**; (Italy) **Edoardo Todaro**; **Fullbacks**: (England) George Hendy |
**(c)** denotes the team captain. **Bold** denotes internationally capped players.^{ST} denotes a short-term signing. Source:

=== Academy squad ===
The Northampton Saints Senior Academy squad is:

Northampton Saints 2026–27 Senior Academy squad
| **Props**: (England) Noah Buxton; (England) Aiden Reid; (England) Ollie Scola; (England) Sonny Tonga'uiha; **Locks**: (England) Alex Mead; (England) George Tonga'uiha | **Back row**: (England) Aiden Ainsworth-Cave; (England) Jack Lewis; (Australia) Charlie Ulcoq; **Scrum-halves**: (England) Sonny Goode; (England) Aidan Pugh; (England) Jonny Weimann; **Fly-halves**: (England) Hugh Shields | **Centres**: (England) Henry Lumley; (England) Freddie St.John; **Wings**: (England) Thomas Rowe; (England) Charlie Tamani; **Fullbacks**: (England) James Pater |
**Bold** denotes internationally capped players. Italics denotes U20 international. Source:

== Club staff ==
=== Current ===
First team coaching

- Phil Dowson – Director of Rugby
- Sam Vesty – Head/Attack Coach
- Jim Henry – Defence Coach
- Jaco Pienaar – Scrum Coach
- James Craig – Line Out Coach

Academy

- Mark Hopley – Academy Manager
- Alex O'Dowd – Player and Coach Development Manager
- Jake Sharp – Academy Coach
- Will Parkin – Academy Coach
- Jim Henry – Academy Coach
- Tim Grimsey – Academy Coach

=== List of managers and directors of rugby ===
- Ian McGeechan (1994–1999)
- John Steele (1999–2002)
- Wayne Smith (2002–2004)
- Alan Solomons (2004–2005)
- Paul Grayson (2005–2007)
- Jim Mallinder (2007–2017)
- Chris Boyd (2018–2022)
- Phil Dowson (2022–present)

Note: The senior coaching role has been variously titled Manager, Head Coach, and Director of Rugby throughout the club's professional era. Phil Dowson is the current Director of Rugby.

== Academy ==
The Northampton Saints Academy mission is to be the best development Club in England, with a mandate to provide in excess of 50% homegrown players in the senior Saints squad, year after year.

It is the professional player development system of Northampton Saints. It is one of the regional academies in England, operating within the Rugby Football Union's academy structure and serving Northamptonshire, Bedfordshire, Buckinghamshire, Cambridgeshire, North Essex and parts of Lincolnshire, Norfolk, Rutland and Suffolk.

The academy is responsible for identifying and developing young players with the aim of progressing them into professional rugby. It forms a key part of the club's player development strategy, with academy graduates regularly making up more than half of the club's senior squad.< name=academy/>

Northampton Saints' principal academy education partner is Moulton College, which competes in the ACE League. The partnership allows academy players to combine full-time education with elite rugby coaching while providing an additional development pathway into professional rugby.

The academy has produced a number of England internationals, including Tommy Freeman, Fraser Dingwall, George Furbank, Alex Coles, Ollie Sleightholme and Henry Pollock.

== Notable former players ==
=== Rugby World Cup ===
The following are players who have represented their countries at the Rugby World Cup, while playing for Northampton:

| Tournament | Players selected | England players | Other national team players |
|---|---|---|---|
| 1987 | 1 | Gary Pearce | |
| 1991 | 2 | Gary Pearce, John Olver | |
| 1995 | 4 | Martin Bayfield, Ian Hunter, Tim Rodber | Peter Walton (Scotland) |
| 1999 | 7 | Nick Beal, Matt Dawson, Paul Grayson, Tim Rodber | Budge Pountney (Scotland) , Allan Bateman (Wales) , Pat Lam (Samoa) |
| 2003 | 5 | Ben Cohen, Matt Dawson, Paul Grayson, Steve Thompson | Tom Smith (Scotland) |
| 2007 | 3 | | Soane Tongaʻuiha (Tonga) , Euan Murray, Sean Lamont (Scotland) |
| 2011 | 8 | Chris Ashton, Ben Foden, Dylan Hartley, Courtney Lawes, Tom Wood | Soane Tongaʻuiha (Tonga) , Vasily Artemiev (Russia) , George Pisi (Samoa) |
| 2015 | 8 | Kieran Brookes, Courtney Lawes, Tom Wood | George North (Wales) , Kahn Fotuali'i, George Pisi, Ken Pisi (Samoa) , Victor Matfield (South Africa) |
| 2019 | 7 | Piers Francis, Courtney Lawes, Lewis Ludlam | Ahsee Tuala (Samoa) , Cobus Reinach (South Africa) , Api Ratuniyarawa (Fiji) , Dan Biggar (Wales) |
| 2023 | 5 | Alex Mitchell, Courtney Lawes, Lewis Ludlam | Sam Matavesi, Temo Mayanavanua (Fiji) |

=== British and Irish Lions (British & Irish Lions) ===
The following players have toured with the British & Irish Lions while members of the club. Other players have been selected but did not tour due to injury, suspension or other reasons:

| Tour | Host nation | Number selected | Players selected |
|---|---|---|---|
| 1899 | Australia | 1 | (England) Blair Swannell |
| 1904 | Australia and New Zealand | 1 | (England) Blair Swannell (2) |
| 1910 | Argentina | 1 | (England) Robin Harrison |
| 1936 | Argentina | 1 | (England) Bill Weston |
| 1955 | South Africa | 3 | (England) Jeff Butterfield (England) Dickie Jeeps (England) Frank Sykes |
| 1959 | Australia and New Zealand | 2 | (England) Jeff Butterfield (2) (England) Dickie Jeeps (2) |
| 1962 | South Africa | 1 | (England) Dickie Jeeps (3) |
| 1966 | Australia and New Zealand | 2 | (England) Keith Savage (England) David Powell |
| 1968 | South Africa | 4 | (England) Keith Savage (2) (England) Bob Taylor (England) Peter Larter (England) Bryan West |
| 1993 | New Zealand | 2 | (England) Ian Hunter (England) Martin Bayfield |
| 1997 | South Africa | 5 | (England) Matt Dawson (England) Tim Rodber (England) Nick Beal (Scotland) Gregor Townsend (England) Paul Grayson |
| 2001 | Australia | 2 | (England) Matt Dawson (2) (England) Ben Cohen |
| 2005 | New Zealand | 1 | (England) Steve Thompson |
| 2009 | South Africa | 1 | (Scotland) Euan Murray |
| 2017 | New Zealand | 2 | (England) Courtney Lawes (Wales) George North |
| 2021 | South Africa | 2 | (England) Courtney Lawes (2) (Wales) Dan Biggar |
| 2025 | Australia | 4 | (England) Henry Pollock (England) Alex Mitchell (England) Fin Smith (England) Tommy Freeman |

=== Hall of Fame ===
Northampton Saints established its Hall of Fame in 2004 to recognise and honour those that have achieved great success and made a significant contribution to the club. The only non-player inducted into the Hall of Fame is former president Keith Barwell.

Note: Flags indicate national union under World Rugby eligibility rules. Players may hold more than one non-World Rugby nationality.

| Player | Position | Union |
|---|---|---|
| Geoff Allen | Centre | England |
| Nick Beal | Fullback | England |
| Freddie Blakiston | Forward | England |
| Jeff Butterfield | Centre | England |
| Vince Cannon | Lock | England |
| Jerry Gordon | Wing | England |
| Paul Grayson | Fly-half | England |
| Roger Horwood | Hooker | England |
| Ian Hunter | Wing | England |
| Ron Jacobs | Prop | England |
| Dickie Jeeps | Scrum-half | England |
| Pat Lam | Number 8 | Samoa |
| Peter Larter | Lock | England |
| Ray Longland | Prop | England |
| Edgar Mobbs | Wing | England |
| Barry Oldham | Wing | England |
| Albert Orton | Back | England |
| Garry Pagel | Prop | South Africa |
| Gary Pearce | Prop | England |
| Budge Pountney | Flanker | Scotland |
| David Powell | Prop | England |
| Tim Rodber | Flanker | England |
| Gordon Sturtridge | Fly-half | Australia |
| Blair Swannell | Forward | England |
| Bob Taylor | Flanker | England |
| Steve Thompson | Hooker | England |
| Billy Weston | Flanker | England |
| Don White | Flanker | England |

=== Captains ===
- 1880–81 F Barker
- 1882 A Timms
- 1883 T Racer
- 1884 E Eyles
- 1885–86 C Stanley
- 1887 T Stanley
- 1888 E S Dunkley
- 1889 C Stanley
- 1890 A E Orton
- 1891 C Stanley
- 1892–93 A E Orton
- 1894–95 C H Davis
- 1896 K H Kingston
- 1897 C H Davis
- 1898 K H Kingston
- 1899 H B Kingston
- 1900–01 W H Kingston
- 1902 H T F Weston
- 1903–04 H E Kingston
- 1905 R West
- 1906 E C Palmer
- 1907 J H Miles
- 1908–13 E R Mobbs
- 1914 E C Cook
- 1920–22 A G Bull
- 1923 C P Tebbitt
- 1924 A G Bull
- 1925 R Vaughan
- 1926 A F Blakiston
- 1927 R Jones
- 1928 J B Merry
- 1929–30 W H Weston
- 1931 E Coley
- 1932 T Harris
- 1933–34 W H Weston
- 1935 A D Matthews
- 1936 R J Longland
- 1937 T Harris
- 1938 W H Weston
- 1939–41 G S Sturtridge
- 1943–46 A P Bell
- 1947 R J Longland
- 1948 R W Hamp
- 1949 E R Knapp
- 1950–54 D F White
- 1955 M J Berridge
- 1956–57 D R White
- 1958 R E G Jeeps
- 1959–61 C R Jacobs
- 1962–63 P J Taylor
- 1964 A R Turnell
- 1965–66 C R Jacobs
- 1967 R B Taylor
- 1968–72 D L Powell
- 1973–74 M J Roper
- 1975–76 I D Wright
- 1977 J J Page
- 1978 P Johnson
- 1979–80 P Sweet
- 1981–82 P McGuckian
- 1983 V Cannon
- 1984 J A G D Raphael
- 1985–86 D R Woodrow
- 1987 G J Poole
- 1988 G Steele-Bodger
- 1989–91 G S Pearce
- 1992–93 C J Olver
- 1994–99 T A K Rodber
- 1999–2001 P R Lam
- 2001 A C Pountney
- 2002–04 A C Pountney and J Leslie
- 2004 C P J Krige
- Nov 2024 S G Thompson
- 2005 S G Thompson and T B Reihana
- 2006–09 T B Reihana
- 2009–14 D M Hartley
- 2015 L Dickson
- 2016 T Wood
- 2017–18 D M Hartley
- 2018–19 A M Waller and D M Hartley
- 2019–20 A M Waller and T Harrison
- 2020–21 A M Waller and L W Ludlam
- 2021–24 L W Ludlam
- 2024–26 G A Furbank
- 2026– F A Dingwall

== Statistics ==
=== Overall stats ===
- Most Points in a match: 111 (v Timișoara Saracens 2019)
- Most Tries in a match: 17 (v Timișoara Saracens 2019)
- Most Conversions in a match: 13 (v Sedgley Park 2008) and (v Timișoara Saracens 2019)
- Most Penalty Goals in a match: 7 (v Richmond 1997)
- Most Drop Goals in a match: 2 (v Newcastle Falcons 1996)

=== Seasons summary ===
| Season | League | | | | | | | | | | | | Domestic Cup | | | | Europe | | Most points | | Top tryscorer(s) | | Avg. Att |
| Season | Division | Lvl | P | W | D | L | F | A | Bon | Pts | Pos | P-o's | KO Cup | AW Cup | Prem Cup | Trophy | Champions Cup | Challenge Cup | Name | P | Name | T | Avg. Att |
|---|---|---|---|---|---|---|---|---|---|---|---|---|---|---|---|---|---|---|---|---|---|---|---|
| 1987–88 | Div 2 | 2 | 10 | 1 | 0 | 9 | 81 | 226 | | 13 | 12th | | R3 | | | | | | | | | | |
| 1988–89 | Div 2 | 2 | 11 | 6 | 1 | 4 | 165 | 131 | | 19 | 3rd | | R3 | | | | | | | | | | |
| 1989–90 | Div 2 ↑ | 2 | 11 | 9 | 1 | 1 | 192 | 135 | | 19 | 1st | | SF | | | | | | | | | | |
| 1990–91 | Div 1 | 1 | 12 | 5 | 1 | 6 | 149 | 254 | | 11 | 9th | | RU | | | | | | | | | | |
| 1991–92 | Div 1 | 1 | 12 | 9 | 1 | 2 | 209 | 136 | | 19 | 3rd | | R4 | | | | | | | | | | |
| 1992–93 | Div 1 | 1 | 12 | 8 | 0 | 4 | 215 | 150 | | 16 | 4th | | SF | | | | | | | | | | |
| 1993–94 | Div 1 | 1 | 18 | 9 | 0 | 9 | 305 | 342 | | 18 | 5th | | R5 | | | | | | | | | | |
| 1994–95 | Div 1 ↓ | 1 | 18 | 6 | 0 | 12 | 267 | 335 | | 12 | 12th | | QF | | | | | | | | | | |
| 1995–96 | Div 2 ↑ | 2 | 18 | 18 | 0 | 0 | 867 | 203 | | 36 | 1st | | R4 | | | | | | | | | | |
| 1996–97 | Div 1 | 1 | 22 | 10 | 0 | 12 | 515 | 477 | | 20 | 8th | | QF | | | | | QF | (England) Paul Grayson | 182 | (England) Matt Allen | 16 | |
| 1997–98 | Prem | 1 | 22 | 9 | 1 | 12 | 493 | 472 | | 19 | 8th | | SF | | | | | PS | (England) Paul Grayson | 253 | (England) Matt Allen | 11 | |
| 1998–99 | Prem | 1 | 26 | 19 | 0 | 7 | 754 | 556 | | 38 | 2nd | | R5 | | | | | n/a | (England) Paul Grayson | 174 | (Samoa) Pat Lam | 14 | |
| 1999–00 | Prem | 1 | 22 | 13 | 0 | 9 | 551 | 480 | | 35 | 5th | | RU | | | | W | | (England) Paul Grayson | 189 | (England) Ben Cohen | 10 | |
| 2000–01 | Prem | 1 | 22 | 13 | 0 | 9 | 518 | 463 | 7 | 59 | 4th | | QF | | | | PS | | (England) Paul Grayson | 277 | (England) Ben Cohen | 20 | |
| 2001–02 | Prem | 1 | 22 | 12 | 1 | 9 | 506 | 426 | 6 | 56 | 5th | | RU | | | | PS | | (England) Paul Grayson | 306 | (England) Ben Cohen | 14 | |
| 2002–03 | Prem | 1 | 22 | 13 | 0 | 9 | 512 | 376 | 10 | 62 | 3rd | SF | RU | | | | QF | | (England) Paul Grayson | 341 | (England) Ben Cohen | 12 | |
| 2003–04 | Prem | 1 | 22 | 15 | 1 | 3 | 574 | 416 | 8 | 70 | 3rd | SF | R6 | | | | PS | | (Australia) Shane Drahm | 262 | (New Zealand) Bruce Reihana | 16 | |
| 2004–05 | Prem | 1 | 22 | 8 | 0 | 14 | 410 | 473 | 8 | 40 | 11th | | QF | | | | QF | | (Australia) Shane Drahm | 236 | (South Africa) Wylie Human | 7 | |
| 2005–06 | Prem | 1 | 22 | 10 | 1 | 11 | 464 | 488 | 11 | 53 | 6th | | | PS | | | | QF | (New Zealand) Bruce Reihana | 310 | (England) Ben Cohen | 15 | |
| 2006–07 | Prem ↓ | 1 | 22 | 6 | 1 | 15 | 342 | 499 | 7 | 33 | 12th | | | PS | | | SF | | (New Zealand) Carlos Spencer | 117 | (New Zealand) Mark Robinson | 12 | |
| 2007–08 | Div 1 ↑ | 2 | 30 | 30 | 0 | 0 | 1321 | 343 | 23 | 143 | 1st | | | | | W | | | (New Zealand) Bruce Reihana | 312 | (England) Chris Ashton | 41 | |
| 2008–09 | Prem | 1 | 22 | 10 | 1 | 11 | 443 | 434 | 7 | 49 | 8th | | | SF | | | | W | (England) Stephen Myler | 316 | (England) Paul Diggin | 14 | |
| 2009–10 | Prem | 1 | 22 | 16 | 0 | 6 | 472 | 322 | 7 | 71 | 2nd | SF | | W | | | QF | | (England) Stephen Myler | 229 | (England) Chris Ashton | 23 | |
| 2010–11 | Prem | 1 | 22 | 14 | 0 | 8 | 533 | 430 | 9 | 65 | 4th | SF | | PS | | | RU | | (England) Stephen Myler | 302 | (England) Paul Diggin | 14 | |
| 2011–12 | Prem | 1 | 22 | 14 | 0 | 8 | 539 | 374 | 9 | 65 | 4th | SF | | RU | | | PS | | (England) Ryan Lamb | 250 | (Russia) Vasily Artemyev | 14 | |
| 2012–13 | Prem | 1 | 22 | 14 | 0 | 8 | 501 | 433 | 9 | 65 | 4th | RU | | PS | | | PS | | (England) Stephen Myler | 236 | (England) Jamie Elliott | 11 | |
| 2013–14 | Prem | 1 | 22 | 16 | 2 | 4 | 604 | 350 | 10 | 78 | 2nd | W | | RU | | | PS | W | (England) Stephen Myler | 323 | (Wales) George North | 9 | |
| 2014–15 | Prem | 1 | 22 | 16 | 1 | 5 | 621 | 400 | 10 | 76 | 1st | SF | | SF | | | QF | | (England) Stephen Myler | 287 | (Wales) George North | 14 | |
| 2015–16 | Prem | 1 | 22 | 12 | 0 | 10 | 455 | 392 | 12 | 60 | 5th | | | NH | | | QF | | (England) Stephen Myler | 207 | (England) Lee Dickson | 6 | |
| 2016–17 | Prem | 1 | 22 | 10 | 0 | 12 | 476 | 490 | 12 | 52 | 7th | | | PS | | | PS | | (England) Stephen Myler | 229 | (England) Mike Haywood | 7 | |
| 2017–18 | Prem | 1 | 22 | 8 | 0 | 14 | 509 | 645 | 11 | 43 | 9th | | | SF | | | PS | | (England) Harry Mallinder | 109 | (Australia) Rob Horne | 8 | |
| 2018–19 | Prem | 1 | 22 | 11 | 0 | 11 | 590 | 521 | 12 | 56 | 4th | SF | | | W | | | QF | (Wales) Dan Biggar | 191 | (South Africa) Cobus Reinach | 17 | |
| 2019–20 | Prem | 1 | 22 | 8 | 0 | 14 | 438 | 547 | 10 | 42 | 8th | | | | PS | | QF | | (England) James Grayson | 142 | (South Africa) Cobus Reinach | 7 | |
| 2020–21 | Prem | 1 | 22 | 11 | 0 | 11 | 469 | 457 | 11 | 57 | 5th | | | | NH | | PS | QF | (England) James Grayson | 96 | (England) Ollie Sleightholme | 9 | |
| 2021–22 | Prem | 1 | 24 | 14 | 0 | 10 | 764 | 639 | 19 | 75 | 4th | SF | | | PS | | PS | R16 | (Wales) Dan Biggar | 193 | (England) Tommy Freeman | 13 | |
| 2022–23 | Prem | 1 | 20 | 11 | 0 | 9 | 620 | 611 | 14 | 58 | 4th | SF | | | SF | | PS | | (England) Fin Smith | 148 | (England) Tommy Freeman | 12 | |
| 2023–24 | Prem | 1 | 18 | 12 | 0 | 6 | 555 | 453 | 12 | 60 | 1st | W | | | PS | | SF | | (England) Fin Smith | 229 | (England) Ollie Sleightholme | 16 | 13,240 |
| 2024–25 | Prem | 1 | 18 | 8 | 0 | 10 | 488 | 515 | 12 | 44 | 8th | | | | QF | | RU | | (England) Fin Smith | 185 | (England) Tommy Freeman | 16 | 13,306 |
| 2025–26 | Prem | 1 | 18 | 14 | 1 | 3 | 693 | 536 | 16 | 74 | 1st | W | | | SF | | QF | | (England) Fin Smith | 192 | (England) Tommy Freeman | 20 | |

=== All-time records ===
As of 23 August 2025

Appearances

| # | Nat. | Name | Period | Appearances |
|---|---|---|---|---|
| 1 | (England) | Ron Jacobs | 1949–1966 | 470 |
| 2 | (England) | Don White | 1943–1961 | 448 |
| 3 | (England) | Vince Cannon | 1973–1989 | 438 |
| 4 | (England) | Alf Chalmers | 1897–1912 | 436 |
| 5 | (England) | Tom Harris | 1923–1936 | 426 |

Tries

| # | Nat. | Name | Period | Tries |
|---|---|---|---|---|
| 1 | (England) | Teddy Cook | 1908–1923 | 219 |
| 2 | (England) | Billy Kingston | 1895–1905 | 207 |
| 3 | (England) | Barry Oldham | 1964–1978 | 185 |
| 4 | (England) | Edgar Mobbs | 1905–1913 | 179 |
| 5 | (England) | Frank Packman | 1983–1996 | 178 |

Points

| # | Nat. | Name | Period | Points |
|---|---|---|---|---|
| 1 | (England) | Paul Grayson | 1996–2005 | 2,786 |
| 2 | (England) | Stephen Myler | 2006–2018 | 2,655 |
| 3 | (England) | Roger Hosen | 1955–1967 | 1,463 |
| 4 | (England) | John Steele | 1988–1994 | 1,385 |
| 5 | (England) | Ian Moffat | 1967–1974 | 1,113 |

== See also ==
- Premiership Rugby
- Heineken Cup
- Premiership Rugby Cup
- European Challenge Cup
- Franklin's Gardens
- English rugby union system
