= Paul Grayson (rugby union) =

England international rugby union player

Paul Grayson MBE
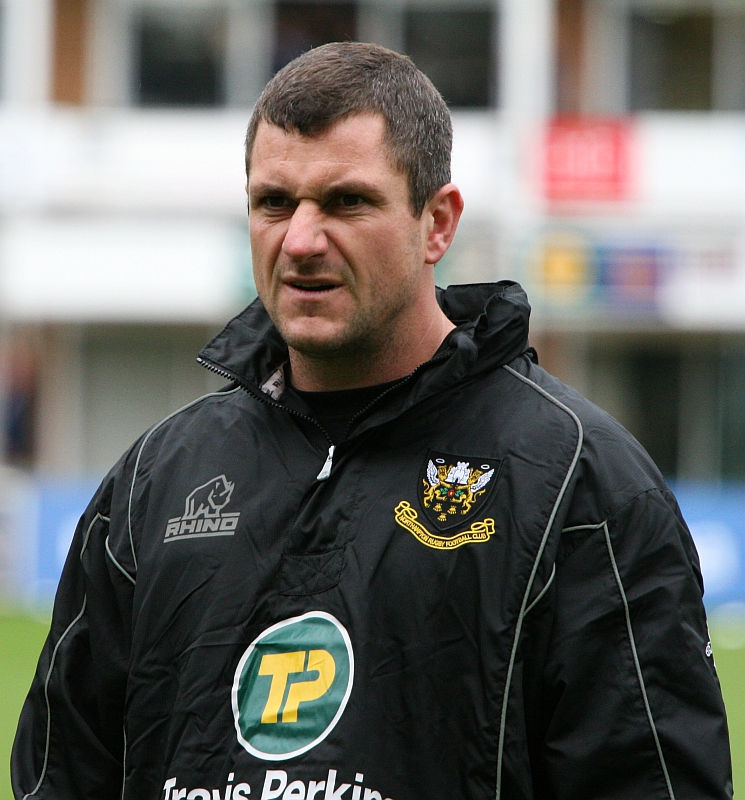
- Paul Grayson in October 2009
- Born: Paul James Grayson; 30 May 1971 (age 55) Chorley, Lancashire, England
- Height: 5 ft 10 in (1.78 m)
- Weight: 13 st 12 lb (88 kg)
- Occupation: Rugby coach

Rugby union career
- Position: Fly-half
Senior career
Years	Team	Apps	(Points)
1993–2005	Northampton Saints	259	(2784)
- Correct as of 15 September 2017
International career
Years	Team	Apps	(Points)
1995–2004	England	32	(400)
- Correct as of 15 September 2017

Paul James Grayson, MBE (born 30 May 1971 in Chorley, Lancashire) is the former assistant head coach of Northampton Saints rugby union club. He formerly played at fly-half for Northampton, for whom he was the all-time leading points scorer, and England. He is known as "Larry" or "Grase".

Prior to Northampton, he played for Preston Grasshoppers and Waterloo. Paul also had a spell at Accrington Stanley as a youth team player. Whilst at Northampton he started in the victorious 2000 Heineken Cup Final, kicking all 9 of Northampton's points as they defeated Munster.

Grayson made his international debut against Western Samoa in December 1995. He was part of the 2003 Rugby World Cup winning England squad.

Northampton announced on 20 November 2012 that Grayson would be leaving the club by mutual consent.

Grayson has three sons, one of whom, James, is an established professional rugby player who plays for Northampton Saints. Joel is in the Northampton Saints EPDG youth setup and Ethan plays for Newcastle Falcons.

== See also ==
- List of top English points scorers and try scorers
