= Steve Thompson (rugby union) =

English rugby union player (born 1978)

Steve Thompson MBE
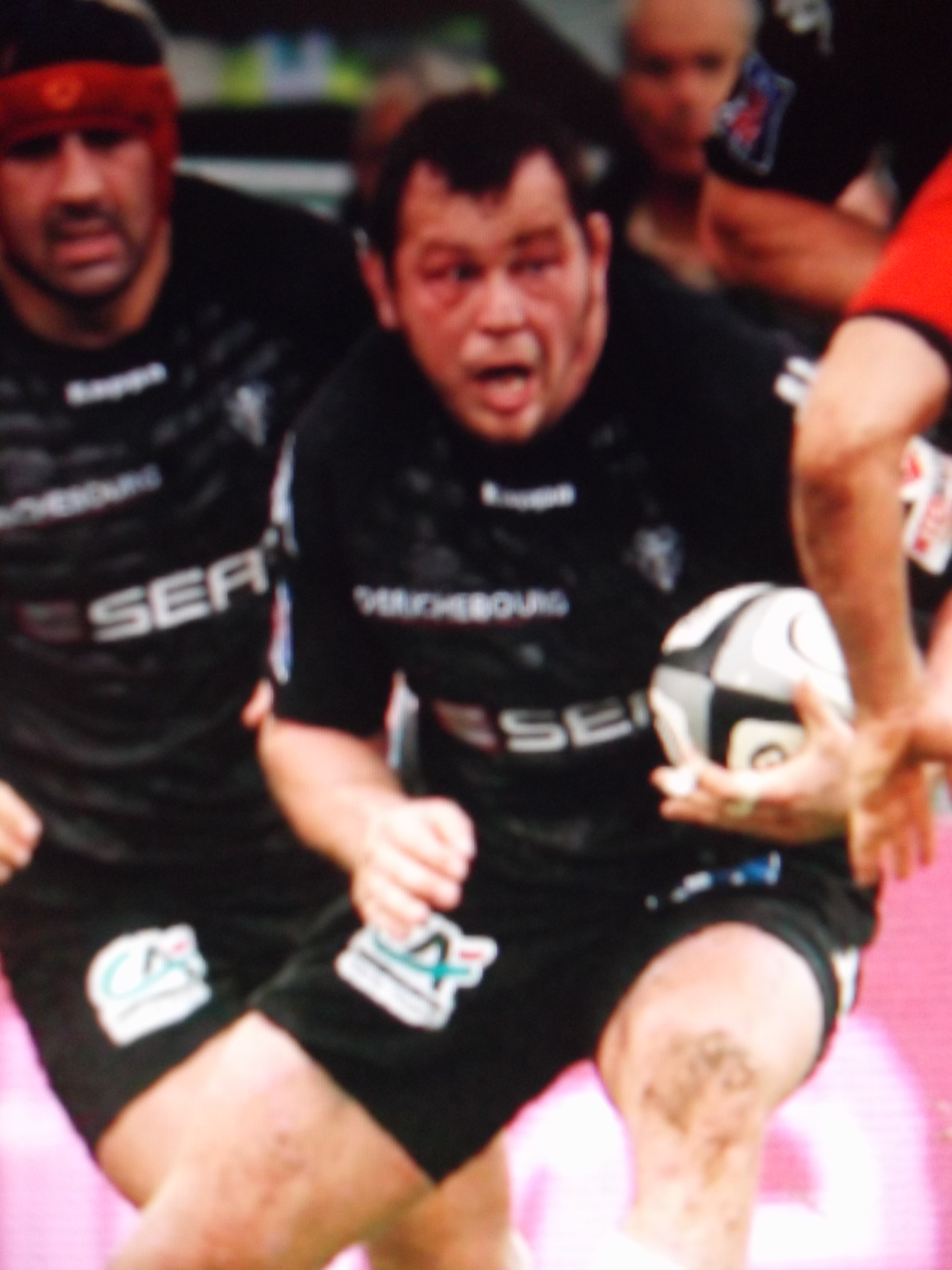
- Thompson in 2010
- Born: Stephen Geoffrey Thompson; 15 July 1978 (age 48) Hemel Hempstead, England
- Height: 1.88 m (6 ft 2 in)
- Weight: 118 kg (18 st 8 lb)
- School: Northampton School for Boys

Rugby union career
- Position: Hooker
Youth career
- Northampton Old Scouts RFC
Senior career
Years	Team	Apps	(Points)
1998–2007	Northampton Saints	195	(80)
2007–2010	CA Brive	42	(10)
2010–2011	Leeds Carnegie	20	(15)
2011	London Wasps	1	(0)
International career
Years	Team	Apps	(Points)
2002–2011	England	73	(20)
2005	British & Irish Lions	3	(0)
- Correct as of 9 September 2024

Stephen Geoffrey Thompson MBE (formerly Steve Walter; born 15 July 1978) is a former rugby union player who played at hooker for Northampton Saints and England. He was once England's most capped hooker and played for the British & Irish Lions.

== Club career ==
=== Northampton Saints ===
Formerly Steve Walter, born 15 July 1978 in Hemel Hempstead, he started playing rugby at 15 at the Northampton School for Boys and Northampton Casuals rugby club, Steve went on to play for Northampton Old Scouts alongside Ben Cohen in a youth team. He also trained with the youth section of Saints and, at 18, was selected for the apprentice scheme at the club's academy as a back row forward. Former Saints coach Ian McGeechan and coaches at the Northampton academy persuaded him to convert to being a hooker.

Despite competing against the Argentinian Federico Méndez in the 1999–2000 season for his club place, he still managed to force his way into the England A squad. Thompson continued to develop as a player and became co-captain of Northampton Saints. At Northampton he was a replacement in the victorious 2000 Heineken Cup Final as they defeated Munster.

=== Retirement and return with Brive ===
On 15 April 2007 Thompson announced his immediate retirement from rugby due to a neck injury that he had suffered during the closing Heineken Cup pool match against Biarritz at Franklin's Gardens in January 2007.

For the 2007/2008 season he signed for CA Brive as a "recruitment and technique adviser". But on 22 October 2007, Thompson announced he would be returning to the game after consulting medical staff. He first played (and won) with Brive on 9 November 2007 in the European Challenge Cup against Connacht. Thompson represented the club in three Top 14 campaigns.

=== Back in the Premiership ===
On 31 May 2010 Thompson finally agreed a 2-year deal with Leeds Carnegie after a lot of speculation. This saw him join up with former International teammate Neil Back who was head coach at Leeds. Leeds were relegated from the 2010–11 Aviva Premiership. On 1 May 2011 it was announced that he had signed a 3-year deal with London Wasps. However, on 3 December 2011 Thompson announced his immediate retirement from the game, following a recurrence of a serious neck injury sustained in Wasps' training in late October, which required surgery to relieve symptoms of numbness and dizziness. Continuing to play would have been a serious health risk.

== International career ==
Thompson was selected for England's summer tour to North America in 2001, where he did well. He made his test debut for England in the 2002 Six Nations with a win against Scotland. He scored his maiden test try against Italy in the 2003 Six Nations, a tournament which saw England win the Grand Slam. Thompson made a significant contribution to England's southern hemisphere tour in June 2003, playing in both victorious tests against New Zealand and Australia.

He was a member of the England team that won the 2003 Rugby World Cup, playing a part in all but one of England's World Cup performances in Australia. He scored his second test try in England's opening World Cup match against Georgia in Perth.

Thompson continued as an England regular in the Autumn games of 2004. He was selected for the 2005 British & Irish Lions tour to New Zealand; on the tour, he seemed to have regained some of his form after a poor 2005 Six Nations.

On 19 May 2009, Martin Johnson gave Thompson a surprise call up for England's summer games against The Barbarians and Argentina. Thompson was recalled to the England squad for the 2009 autumn internationals along with 2003 world cup winners Jonny Wilkinson and Lewis Moody.

In the 2011 Six Nations, he scored the only try for England in their match against Ireland on 19 March 2011, a tournament which saw England win the Six Nations, but were denied the Grand Slam and Triple Crown with defeat to Ireland in Dublin. He also played in England's 2011 Rugby World Cup campaign, and was one of a minority of players whose reputation did not suffer.

== Post-retirement ==
Thompson has been based in Dubai and has acted as an ambassador for the Christina Noble Children's Foundation. He has also been appointed as sports ambassador for security and facilities management services company Transguard, and worked in the media as rugby analyst for OSN and ESPN (UK).

== Health and dementia ==
In December 2020, Thompson, aged 42, revealed that he had been diagnosed with early onset dementia with probable chronic traumatic encephalopathy (CTE), which is caused by repeated blows to the head (CTE can only be confirmed by post-mortem dissection of the brain). He said that he has no memory at all of events such as winning the 2003 Rugby World Cup and sometimes forgets his wife's name. He has also said he would not play rugby again, and would not like his son to take up rugby "the way it is at the moment".

Thompson and seven other players under 45 with a similar diagnosis were proposing to take legal action against World Rugby for failing to protect them.

On 23 September 2021, Thompson announced that he had decided to donate his brain for CTE research.
