= 2009–10 LV Cup =

Tournament details
- Countries: England; Wales
- Tournament format(s): Round-robin and knockout
- Date: November 2009 - March 2010

Tournament statistics
- Teams: 16
- Matches played: 35
- Attendance: 278,978 (7,971 per match)
- Tries scored: 150 (4.29 per match)

Final
- Venue: Sixways Stadium
- Attendance: 12,024
- Champions: (England) Northampton Saints (1st title)
- Runners-up: (England) Gloucester

The 2009–10 LV Cup (styled as the LV= Cup) was the 39th season of England's national rugby union cup competition, and the fifth to follow the Anglo-Welsh format.

Northampton Saints were crowned champions after beating Gloucester in the final at Worcester's Sixways Stadium.

The structure of the competition was altered from previous years. The competition continued to consist of the four Welsh Celtic League teams and the twelve Guinness Premiership clubs, arranged into pools consisting of three English teams and one Welsh. However, the new format saw teams guaranteed two home and two away pool matches, with teams in Pools 1 and 4 playing each other and teams in Pools 2 and 3 playing each other. The competition took place on international fixture dates during the Autumn Internationals and Six Nations, with the aim of allowing teams to develop their squad players.

On 29 October 2009, little more than a week before the start of this season's competition, British insurer LV was unveiled as the new sponsor.

== Pool stage ==
=== Points system ===
The points scoring system for the pool stage was as follows:

- 4 points for a win
- 2 points for a draw
- 1 bonus point for scoring four or more tries in a match (TB)
- 1 bonus point for a loss by seven points or less (LB)

The ranking criteria were:

- If two or more clubs in the same pool end the pool stage equal on match points, then the order in which they have finished will be determined by:
  - i. the greater number of matches won by the club and
  - ii. if the number of matches won is equal, the club with the greater total number of tries scored and
  - iii. if the total number of tries scored is equal, the club with the greater points difference (points scored for, less points scored against) and
  - iv. if the points difference is equal, the club with the fewer number of red cards and
  - v. if the number of red cards is the same, by the toss a coin.

=== Pool 1 v Pool 4 ===
Pool 1
Pos	Team	Pld	W	D	L	PF	PA	PD	T	TB	LB	Pts
1	(England) Saracens	4	2	0	2	83	69	+14	8	1	1	10
2	(England) Leicester Tigers	4	2	0	2	84	82	+2	10	1	0	9
3	(England) Sale Sharks	4	1	0	3	57	83	−26	7	1	1	6
4	(Wales) Ospreys	4	1	0	3	68	97	−29	9	0	1	5

Pool 4
Pos	Team	Pld	W	D	L	PF	PA	PD	T	TB	LB	Pts
1	(England) Northampton Saints	4	4	0	0	81	45	+36	7	0	0	16
2	(Wales) Newport Gwent Dragons	4	3	0	1	103	79	+24	10	0	0	12
3	(England) Bath	4	2	0	2	94	75	+19	12	1	0	9
4	(England) Leeds Carnegie	4	1	0	3	53	93	−40	6	0	1	5

Source: ref name="Premiership" />

==== Round 1 ====
5 November 2009
19:30

Ospreys (Wales)	17–19	(England) Northampton Saints
Try: Spratt; Hibbard; Con: Owen; Pen: Owen	Report	Try: Cannon; Con: Myler; Pen: Myler (4)

Liberty Stadium, Swansea
Attendance: 4,322
Referee: James Jones (WRU)

6 November 2009
19:30

Newport Gwent Dragons (Wales)	20–9	(England) Sale Sharks
Try: Connor; Lee; Con: Connor; Greendale; Pen: Connor; Greendale	Report	Pen: Hodgson (3)

Rodney Parade, Newport
Attendance: 4,539
Referee: Martin Fox (RFU)

8 November 2009
15:00

Leeds Carnegie (England)	28–17	(England) Leicester Tigers
	Report

Headingley, Leeds
Attendance: 3,893
Referee: Sean Davey (RFU)

8 November 2009
15:00

Saracens (England)	30–22	(England) Bath
	Report

Vicarage Road, Watford
Attendance: 6,654
Referee: Dean Richards (RFU)

==== Round 2 ====
13 November 2009
19:45

Sale Sharks (England)	27–3	(England) Leeds Carnegie
Try: Vakacegu; Ripol; O'Donnell; Seymour; Con: Hodgson (2); Pen: Hodgson	Report	Pen: Ford

Edgeley Park, Stockport
Attendance: 5,536

14 November 2009
12:30

Bath (England)	21–11	(Wales) Ospreys
Try: Watson; Browne; Con: Davis; Pen: Davis (3)	Report	Try: Tipuric; Pen: Davies; Owen

Recreation Ground, Bath
Attendance: 10,789
Referee: Sean Davey (RFU)

14 November 2009
13:00

Northampton Saints (England)	19–3	(England) Saracens
Try: Ashton; Reihana; Pen: Myler (3)	Report	Pen: Goode

Franklin's Gardens, Northampton
Attendance: 12,037
Referee: Gwyn Morris (WRU)

14 November 2009
15:00

Leicester Tigers (England)	29–20	(Wales) Newport Gwent Dragons
Try: Crane; Allen; Penalty; Con: Staunton; Pen: Staunton (2); Flood (2)	Report	Try: Tovey; Brew; Gomer-Davies; Con: Connor; Pen: Conner

Welford Road, Leicester
Attendance: 16,297
Referee: Tim Wigglesworth (RFU)

==== Round 3 ====
29 January 2010
19:15

Newport Gwent Dragons (Wales)	40–19	(Wales) Ospreys
Try: A. Jones; Smith; Brew; Con: Tovey (2); Pen: Tovey (7)	Report	Try: Owen; Penalty; Prydie; Con: Prydie (2)

Rodney Parade, Newport
Attendance: 6,027
Referee: James Jones (WRU)

29 January 2010
19:30

Leeds Carnegie (England)	5–28	(England) Saracens
Try: Wackett	Report	Try: Joubert; Brits; Powell; Marshall; Con: Hougaard (3); Jackson

Headingley, Leeds
Attendance: 1,781

29 January 2010
19:45

Leicester Tigers (England)	27–11	(England) Bath
Try: Twelvetrees (2); Penalty; Tuilagi; Con: Vesty (2); Pen: Vesty	Report	Try: Fa'amatuainu; Pen: Davis (2)

Welford Road, Leicester
Attendance: 19,772
Referee: David Rose (RFU)

29 January 2010
19:45

Sale Sharks (England)	14–20	(England) Northampton Saints
Try: Hodgson; Koyamailbole	Report	Try: Mayor; Diggin; Pen: Myler (2)

Edgeley Park, Stockport
Attendance: 6,506

==== Round 4 ====
4 February 2010
19:25

Ospreys (Wales)	21–17	(England) Leeds Carnegie
	Report

Liberty Stadium, Swansea
Attendance: 2,557
Referee: Gwyn Morris (WRU)

6 February 2010
14:15

Bath (England)	40–7	(England) Sale Sharks
	Report

Recreation Ground, Bath
Attendance: 10,165
Referee: James Jones (WRU)

6 February 2010
15:00

Northampton Saints (England)	23–11	(England) Leicester Tigers
	Report

Franklin's Gardens, Northampton
Attendance: 13,092
Referee: Dave Pearson (RFU)

7 February 2010
15:00

Saracens (England)	22–23	(Wales) Newport Gwent Dragons
	Report

Vicarage Road, Watford
Attendance: 5,939
Referee: Wayne Barnes (RFU)

=== Pool 2 v Pool 3 ===
Pool 2
Pos	Team	Pld	W	D	L	PF	PA	PD	T	TB	LB	Pts
1	(England) Gloucester	4	2	0	2	87	81	+6	12	1	2	11
2	(Wales) Scarlets	4	2	1	1	88	83	+5	9	1	0	11
3	(England) London Irish	4	1	0	3	54	70	−16	4	0	2	6
4	(England) Newcastle Falcons	4	0	0	4	41	105	−64	5	1	1	2

Pool 3
Pos	Team	Pld	W	D	L	PF	PA	PD	T	TB	LB	Pts
1	(Wales) Cardiff Blues	4	3	0	1	120	84	+36	14	2	1	15
2	(England) London Wasps	4	3	0	1	67	55	+12	6	0	1	13
3	(England) Harlequins	4	2	1	1	79	67	+12	7	0	1	11
4	(England) Worcester Warriors	4	2	0	2	73	64	+9	8	1	0	9

==== Round 1 ====
7 November 2009
12:30

Worcester Warriors (England)	32–6	(England) Newcastle Falcons
	Report

Sixways Stadium, Worcester
Attendance: 6,704

8 November 2009
13:45

Harlequins (England)	15–15	(Wales) Scarlets
	Report

The Stoop, London
Attendance: 9,653
Referee: Tim Hayes (WRU)

8 November 2009
15:00

Gloucester (England)	25–26	(Wales) Cardiff Blues
	Report

Kingsholm Stadium, Gloucester
Attendance: 6,099
Referee: Rob Debney (RFU)

8 November 2009
15:00

London Irish (England)	20–24	(England) London Wasps
	Report

Madejski Stadium, Reading
Attendance: 10,010
Referee: Jonathan Kaplan (SARU)

==== Round 2 ====
14 November 2009
15:00

Scarlets (Wales)	32–17	(England) Worcester Warriors
Try: Daniel; Lyons; Evans; Priestland; Con: Priestland (3); Pen: Priestland (2)	Report	Try: Cox; Kitchener; Con: MacRae (2); Pen: Crook

Parc y Scarlets, Llanelli
Attendance: 5,560
Referee: David Rose (RFU)

15 November 2009
13:45

Cardiff Blues (Wales)	11–12	(England) London Irish
Try: Rees; Pen: Sweeney (2)	Report	Pen: Hewat (2); Homer; Lamb

Cardiff City Stadium, Cardiff
Attendance: 7,778
Referee: JP Doyle (RFU)

15 November 2009
15:00

London Wasps (England)	21–14	(England) Gloucester
Try: Varndell; Simpson; Con: Walder; Pen: Hickey; Walder (2)	Report	Try: Burns (2); Con: Burns (2)

Adams Park, High Wycombe
Attendance: 7,475
Referee: Martin Fox (RFU)

15 November 2009
15:00

Newcastle Falcons (England)	8–19	(England) Harlequins
Try: Tait; Pen: Miller	Report	Try: Smith; Con: Clegg; Pen: Clegg (4)

Kingston Park, Newcastle upon Tyne
Attendance: 4,650
Referee: Greg Garner (RFU)

==== Round 3 ====
30 January 2010
15:00

Gloucester (England)	17–5	(England) Worcester Warriors
Try: Burns; Qera; Con: Robinson; Pen: Robinson (2)	Report	Try: Pennell

Kingsholm Stadium, Gloucester
Attendance: 7,192

30 January 2010
17:45

London Wasps (England)	13–18	(Wales) Scarlets
Try: Varndell (2); Pen: Walder	Report	Pen: Priestland (6)

Adams Park, High Wycombe
Attendance: 8,070
Referee: Dean Richards (RFU)

31 January 2010
15:00

Cardiff Blues (Wales)	45–24	(England) Newcastle Falcons
	Report

Cardiff City Stadium, Cardiff
Attendance: 6,000
Referee: James Jones (WRU)

31 January 2010
15:00

London Irish (England)	13–16	(England) Harlequins
	Report

Madejski Stadium, Reading
Attendance: 10,030
Referee: Martin Fox (RFU)

==== Round 4 ====
6 February 2010
15:00

Scarlets (Wales)	23–38	(Wales) Cardiff Blues
	Report

Parc y Scarlets, Llanelli
Attendance: 5,671
Referee: Greg Garner (RFU)

6 February 2010
15:00

Worcester Warriors (England)	19–9	(England) London Irish
	Report

Sixways Stadium, Worcester
Attendance: 7,501
Referee: David Bodilly (WRU)

7 February 2010
15:00

Harlequins (England)	29–31	(England) Gloucester
	Report

The Stoop, London
Attendance: 9,732
Referee: Sean Davey (RFU)

7 February 2010
15:00

Newcastle Falcons (England)	3–9	(England) London Wasps
	Report

Kingston Park, Newcastle upon Tyne
Attendance: 4,651
Referee: Andrew Small (RFU)

== Knockout stage ==
Semi-finals
14 March 2010 - Franklin's Gardens
(England) Northampton Saints	31
(England) Saracens	20
14 March 2010 - Cardiff City Stadium
(Wales) Cardiff Blues	18
(England) Gloucester	29

Final
21 March 2010 - Sixways Stadium
(England) Northampton Saints	30
(England) Gloucester	24

=== Qualification criteria ===
The top teams from each pool qualify for the knockout stage. The pool winners were decided by the following criteria:

1. The pool winner will be the club with the highest number of match points in each pool. The pool winners will be ranked 1 to 4 by reference to the number of match points earned in the pools.
2. If two or more clubs in the same pool end the pool stage equal on match points, then the order in which they have finished will be determined by:

i. the greater number of matches won by the club and
ii. if the number of matches won is equal, the club with the greater total number of tries scored and
iii. if the total number of tries scored is equal, the club with the greater points difference (points scored for, less points scored against) and
iv. if the points difference is equal, the club with the fewer number of red cards and
v. if the number of red cards is the same, by the toss a coin.

Each of the four qualifying clubs shall be ranked as above and shall play each other as follows:

Semi-final 1 - 1st ranked club v 4th ranked club
Semi-final 2 - 2nd ranked club v 3rd ranked club

The first club listed in each of the semi-final matches shall be the home club.

Qualifiers
Pos	Team	Pld	W	D	L	PF	PA	PD	T	TB	LB	Pts
1	(England) Northampton Saints	4	4	0	0	81	45	+36	7	0	0	16
2	(Wales) Cardiff Blues	4	3	0	1	120	84	+36	14	2	1	15
3	(England) Gloucester	4	2	0	2	87	81	+6	12	1	2	11
4	(England) Saracens	4	2	0	2	83	69	+14	8	1	1	10

=== Semi-finals ===
14 March 2010
12:15

Cardiff Blues (Wales)	18–29	(England) Gloucester
Try: Laulala; Sweeney; Con: Blair (2); Pen: Blair (2)	Report	Try: Burns; Simpson-Daniel (3); Con: Robinson (3); Pen: Robinson

Cardiff City Stadium
Attendance: 8,378

14 March 2010
16:15

Northampton Saints (England)	31–20	(England) Saracens
Try: Dowson; Mujati; Diggin; Best; Con: Geraghty; Pen: Geraghty (3)	Report	Try: Melck; Pen: Hougaard (4); Jackson (1)

Franklin's Gardens, Northampton
Attendance: 11,894
Referee: Romain Poite (FFR)

=== Final ===
21 March 2010
15:30

Northampton Saints (England)	30–24	(England) Gloucester
Try: Tongaʻuiha; Downey; Dickson; Con: Myler (3); Pen: Myler (3)	Report	Try: Qera; Penalty try Con: Robinson; Pen: Robinson (4)

Sixways Stadium, Worcester
Attendance: 12,024
Referee: Alan Lewis (IRFU)

FB	15	(England) Shane Geraghty
RW	14	(New Zealand) Bruce Reihana
OC	13	(England) Jon Clarke
IC	12	(Ireland) James Downey
LW	11	(England) Paul Diggin
FH	10	(England) Stephen Myler
SH	9	(England) Lee Dickson
N8	8	(Ireland) Roger Wilson
OF	7	(Ireland) Neil Best
BF	6	(England) Phil Dowson (c)
RL	5	(South Africa) Juandré Kruger
LL	4	(England) Courtney Lawes
TP	3	(South Africa) Brian Mujati
HK	2	(South Africa) Brett Sharman
LP	1	(Tonga) Soane Tongaʻuiha
Replacements:
HK	16	(England) Andy Long
PR	17	(South Africa) Regardt Dreyer
PR	18	(England) Jon Vickers
FL	19	(England) Mark Hopley
N8	20	(England) Mark Easter
SH	21	(England) Alan Dickens
FH	22	(Ireland) Barry Everitt
CE	23	(Scotland) Joe Ansbro
Coach:
(England) Jim Mallinder

FB	15	(England) Freddie Burns
RW	14	(England) James Simpson-Daniel
OC	13	(New Zealand) Tim Molenaar
IC	12	(Samoa) Eliota Fuimaono-Sapolu
LW	11	(England) Lesley Vainikolo
FH	10	(Wales) Nicky Robinson
SH	9	(Scotland) Rory Lawson
N8	8	(England) Adam Eustace
OF	7	(Fiji) Akapusi Qera
BF	6	(England) Peter Buxton (c)
RL	5	(England) Alex Brown
LL	4	(Wales) Will James
TP	3	(France) Pierre Capdevielle
HK	2	(France) Olivier Azam
LP	1	(England) Nick Wood
Replacements:
HK	16	(England) Darren Dawidiuk
PR	17	(England) Yann Thomas
PR	18	(England) Rupert Harden
FL	19	(Fiji) Apolosi Satala
FL	20	(England) Andy Hazell
SH	21	(England) Dave Lewis
WG	22	(England) Tom Voyce
WG	23	(England) Charlie Sharples
Coach:
(Scotland) Bryan Redpath

== See also ==
- 2009–10 Premiership Rugby
- 2009–10 Celtic League
