= 2002–03 Powergen Cup =

Tournament statistics

The 2002–03 Powergen Cup was the 32nd edition of England's rugby union club competition. Gloucester won the competition defeating Northampton Saints in the final. The event was sponsored by Powergen and the final was held at Twickenham Stadium.

== Draw and results ==
=== First round ===
Team one	Team two	Score
Aspatria	Halifax	29-33
Bedford Athletic	Blaydon	36-3
Darlington Mowden Park	Preston Grasshoppers	40-38
Dudley Kingswinford	Waterloo	19-23
New Brighton	Darlington	32-19
Nuneaton	Macclesfield	39-22
Scunthorpe	Cleckheaton	14-28
South Leicester	Liverpool St Helens	28-26
Tynedale	Hull Ionians	19-13
Walsall	Broadstreet	13-31
Barking	Old Patesians	24-15
Barnstaple	Tabard	11-14
Blackheath	Weston-super-Mare	39-11
Havant	Reading	6-19
Letchworth Garden City	Camberley	29-12
Lydney	Basingstoke	23-8
Penryn	Redruth	13-28
Richmond	Westcombe Park	20-31
Rosslyn Park	Maidenhead	52-10
Spalding	Twickenham	46-27
Staines	North Walsham	3-71
Worthing	Old Colleians	24-18

=== Second round ===
Team one	Team two	Score
Bedford Athletic	Broadstreet	43-8
Cleckheaton	Nottingham	25-28
Fylde	South Leicester	22-13
Halifax	Sedgley Park	22-16
Kendal	Darlington Mowden Park	32-26
Nuneaton	Harrogate	29-17
Storubridge	Doncaster	19-11
Tynedale	Waterloo	32-37
Wharfedale	New Brighton	21-24
Barking	Reading	24-22
Bracknell	Redruth	51-21
Esher	Rosslyn Park	14-29
Henley Hawks	Launceston	46-10
Lydney	Letchworth Garden City	46-10
Newbury	Spalding	114-0
Tabard	Penzance/Newlyn	6-57
Westcombe Park	Blackheath	19-25
Worthing	North Walsham	3-3

=== Third round ===
Team one	Team two	Score
Barking	Nottingham	13-33
Bedford Athletic	Orrell	11-74
Bracknell	Worcester	5-73
Fylde	Lydney	36-15
Halifax	Bedford	27-17
Henley Hawks	Wakefield	27-15
Manchester	Blackheath	57-0
Moseley	Waterloo	25-28
New Brighton	Otley	17-22
North Walsham	Kendal	33-29
Nuneaton	London Welsh	11-12
Penzance/Newlyn	Exeter	11-19
Rosslyn Park	Newbury	36-34
Rotherham	Coventry	61-12
Rugby	Birmingham/Solihull	25-39
Stourbridge	Plymouth Albion	20-48

=== Fourth round ===
Team one	Team two	Score
Birmingham/Solihull	Fylde	44-14
Henley Hawks	Exeter	6-37
London Welsh	Nottingham	52-7
Orrell	North Walsham	47-12
Otley	Plymouth Albion	25-37
Rosslyn Park	Rotherham	7-83
Waterloo	Halifax	35-38
Worcester	Manchester	73-12

=== Fifth round ===
Team one	Team two	Score
Halifax	Worcester	12-13
London Welsh	Exeter	13-36
Rotherham	Birmingham/Solihull	41-10
Plymouth Albion	Orrell	3-8

=== Sixth round ===
Team one	Team two	Score
Saracens	Sale Sharks	26-20
Bristol Shoguns	Rotherham	19-24
Newcastle Falcons	London Irish	16-17
Gloucester	Exeter	35-6
London Wasps	Bath	17-20
Leicester Tigers	Worcester	36-9
Orrell	Northampton Saints	44-55
Harlequins	Leeds Tykes	17-13

=== Quarter-finals ===
Team one	Team two	Score
Bath	Northampton Saints	29-30
London Irish	Rotherham	30-11
Gloucester	Saracens	51-20
Harlequins	Leicester Tigers	12-19

=== Semi-finals ===
Team one	Team two	Score
London Irish	Northampton Saints	9-38
Leicester Tigers	Gloucester	11-16

=== Final ===
5 April 2003

Gloucester	40–22	Northampton Saints
Try: Simpson-Daniel 2 Forrester; Gorvey; Con: Mercier 4 Pen: Mercier 3 Drop: Mercier		Try: Nick Beal; Con: Grayson; Pen: Grayson 5

Twickenham Stadium, London
Attendance: 75,000
Referee: Tony Spreadbury (Somerset)

Gloucester
Northampton

15	Thinus Delport
14	Marcel Garvey
13	Terry Fanolua
12	Henry Paul
11	James Simpson-Daniel
10	Ludovic Mercier
9	Andy Gomarsall
8	James Forrester
7	Andy Hazell
6	Jake Boer (c)
5	Adam Eustace
4	Rob Fidler
3	Andy Deacon
2	Olivier Azam
1	Trevor Woodman
Replacements:
16	Clive Stuart-Smith
17	Simon Amor
18	Robert Todd
19	Chris Fortey
20	Rodrigo Roncero
21	Junior Paramore
22	Ed Pearce
Coach:
Nigel Melville

15	Nick Beal
14	Bruce Reihana
13	Peter Jorgensen
12	John Leslie joint captain (c)
11	Ben Cohen
10	Paul Grayson
9	Matt Dawson
8	Andrew Blowers
7	Budge Pountney joint captain (c)
6	Mark Connors
5	Steve Williams
4	Matt Lord
3	Robbie Morris
2	Steve Thompson
1	Tom Smith
Replacements:
16	Dan Richmond
17	Mattie Stewart
18	Grant Seeley
19	Darren Fox
20	Johnny Howard
21	James Brooks
22	Chris Hyndman
Coach:
Wayne Smith
