= 2010–11 LV Cup =

Tournament details
- Countries: England; Wales
- Tournament format(s): Round-robin and knockout
- Date: 4 November 2010 – 20 March 2011

Tournament statistics
- Teams: 16
- Matches played: 35
- Attendance: 272,795 (7,794 per match)
- Tries scored: 174 (4.97 per match)
- Top point scorer(s): Nick Evans (Harlequins) (48 points)
- Top try scorer(s): Charlie Sharples (Gloucester) (8 tries)

Final
- Venue: Franklin's Gardens, Northampton
- Attendance: 6,848
- Champions: Gloucester (5th title)
- Runners-up: Newcastle Falcons

The 2010–11 LV Cup (styled as the LV= Cup) was the 40th season of England's national rugby union cup competition, and the sixth to follow the Anglo-Welsh format.

The competition consisted of the four Welsh Magners League teams and the twelve Aviva Premiership clubs arranged into pools consisting of three English and one Welsh team. Teams were guaranteed two home and two away pool matches, with teams in Pools 1 and 4 playing each other and teams in Pools 2 and 3 playing each other. The competition took place on international fixture dates during the Autumn Internationals and Six Nations, thus allowing teams to develop their squad players.

The competition made history this season when London Wasps announced that their Round 3 match against Harlequins would be played in Abu Dhabi on January 30, 2011 – making it the first competitive game between two English clubs to take place abroad.

Gloucester claimed the cup with a comprehensive 34–7 victory over Newcastle Falcons in the final at Franklin's Gardens in Northampton. It was the fifth victory for Gloucester in the competition (including one shared title), and the first since the current Anglo-Welsh format was adopted in 2005.

== Pool stages ==
=== Points system ===
The points scoring system for the pool stages will be as follows:

- 4 points for a win
- 2 points for a draw
- 1 bonus point for scoring four or more tries in a match (TB)
- 1 bonus point for a loss by seven points or less (LB)

The ranking criteria were:

- If two or more clubs in the same pool end the pool stage equal on match points, then the order in which they have finished will be determined by:
  - i. the greater number of matches won by the club and
  - ii. if the number of matches won is equal, the club with the greater total number of tries scored and
  - iii. if the total number of tries scored is equal, the club with the greater points difference (points scored for, less points scored against) and
  - iv. if the points difference is equal, the club with the fewer number of red cards and
  - v. if the number of red cards is the same, by the toss a coin.

=== Pool 1 v Pool 4 ===
Pool 1
Team	Pld	W	D	L	PF	PA	PD	T	TB	LB	Pts
(England) Newcastle Falcons	4	2	0	2	61	59	+2	6	0	1	9
(England) London Wasps	4	1	0	3	50	101	−51	4	0	1	4 (Note: London Wasps were deducted 1 competition point for fielding an ineligible player.)
(Wales) Cardiff Blues	4	0	1	3	56	104	−48	4	0	0	2
(England) Leicester Tigers	4	0	0	4	60	141	−81	6	0	0	0

Notes:

Pool 4
Team	Pld	W	D	L	PF	PA	PD	T	TB	LB	Pts
(England) Harlequins	4	4	0	0	123	65	+58	13	1	0	17
(England) Bath	4	3	0	1	110	51	+59	12	1	1	14
(Wales) Ospreys	4	3	0	1	82	55	+27	8	1	1	14
(England) Exeter Chiefs	4	2	1	1	90	56	+34	9	1	0	11

==== Round 1 ====
5 November 2010
19:30

Leicester Tigers (England)	25–34	(England) Harlequins
	Report

Welford Road
Attendance: 16,197
Referee: Dave Pearson (England)

5 November 2010
19:45

Bath (England)	29–19	(Wales) Cardiff Blues
	Report

Recreation Ground
Attendance: 11,911
Referee: Greg Garner (England)

6 November 2010
15:00

Exeter Chiefs (England)	29–6	(England) London Wasps
	Report

Sandy Park
Attendance: 7,799
Referee: Neil Paterson (Scotland)

6 November 2010
18:30

Newcastle Falcons (England)	18–17	(Wales) Ospreys
	Report

Kingston Park
Attendance: 3,307
Referee: Tim Wigglesworth (England)

==== Round 2 ====
12 November 2010
19:30

Cardiff Blues (Wales)	23–23	(England) Exeter Chiefs
	Report

Cardiff City Stadium
Attendance: 7,018
Referee: David Jones (Wales)

12 November 2010
19:45

Ospreys (Wales)	46–13	(England) Leicester Tigers
	Report

Brewery Field
Attendance: 6,632
Referee: Leighton Hodges (Wales)

14 November 2010
15:00

Harlequins (England)	28–20	(England) Newcastle Falcons
	Report

The Stoop
Attendance: 9,450
Referee: David Rose (England)

14 November 2010
15:00

London Wasps (England)	18–16	(England) Bath
	Report

Adams Park
Attendance: 6,518
Referee: Martin Fox (England)

==== Round 3 ====
29 January 2011
14:15

Bath (England)	11–6	(England) Newcastle Falcons
	Report

Recreation Ground
Attendance: 11,631
Referee: Rob Debney (England)

29 January 2011
15:00

Exeter Chiefs (England)	35–10	(England) Leicester Tigers
	Report

Sandy Park
Attendance: 7,445
Referee: Tim Hayes (Wales)

29 January 2011
18:30

Cardiff Blues (Wales)	7–29	(Wales) Ospreys
	Report

Cardiff City Stadium
Attendance: 10,320
Referee: Dave Pearson (England)

30 January 2011
19:15 GST (Note: 15:15 GMT)

London Wasps (England)	13–38	(England) Harlequins
	Report

Emirates Palace, Abu Dhabi
Attendance: 4,856
Referee: Martin Fox (England)

==== Round 4 ====
4 February 2011
19:30

Leicester Tigers (England)	12–26	(England) Bath
	Report

Welford Road
Attendance: 13,156
Referee: James Jones (Wales)

6 February 2011
15:00

Newcastle Falcons (England)	17–3	(England) Exeter Chiefs
	Report

Kingston Park
Attendance: 3,863
Referee: Chris White (England)

6 February 2011
15:15

Harlequins (England)	23–7	(Wales) Cardiff Blues
	Report

The Stoop
Attendance: 8,723
Referee: David Rose (England)

6 February 2011
15:00

Ospreys (Wales)	18–13	(England) London Wasps
	Report

Brewery Field
Attendance: 4,800
Referee: Dean Richards (England)

=== Pool 2 v Pool 3 ===
Pool 2
Team	Pld	W	D	L	PF	PA	PD	T	TB	LB	Pts
(Wales) Newport Gwent Dragons	4	3	0	1	75	69	+6	8	0	0	12
(England) Saracens	4	2	1	1	116	72	+44	15	2	0	11 (Note: Saracens were deducted 1 competition point for fielding an ineligible player.)
(England) London Irish	4	1	0	3	75	125	−50	9	1	0	5
(England) Leeds Carnegie	4	0	0	4	70	143	−73	8	1	1	2

Notes:

Pool 3
Team	Pld	W	D	L	PF	PA	PD	T	TB	LB	Pts
(England) Gloucester	4	3	0	1	119	52	+67	18	3	1	16
(England) Northampton Saints	4	2	1	1	108	86	+22	14	1	0	11
(Wales) Scarlets	4	2	0	2	93	89	+4	9	1	0	9
(England) Sale Sharks	4	2	0	2	89	109	−20	12	1	0	9

==== Round 1 ====
4 November 2010
19:35

Newport Gwent Dragons (Wales)	18–12	(England) Gloucester
	Report

Rodney Parade
Attendance: 5,244
Referee: James Jones (Wales)

5 November 2010
19:45

Sale Sharks (England)	39–14	(England) London Irish
	Report

Edgeley Park
Attendance: 5,106
Referee: Llyr Ap Geraint-Roberts (England)

6 November 2010
12:00

Scarlets (Wales)	52–13	(England) Leeds Carnegie
	Report

Parc y Scarlets
Attendance: 5,013
Referee: Tim Hayes (Wales)

7 November 2010
15:00

Saracens (England)	22–22	(England) Northampton Saints
	Report

Vicarage Road
Attendance: 6,015
Referee: Chris White (England)

==== Round 2 ====
12 November 2010
19:45

Northampton Saints (England)	28–3	(Wales) Newport Gwent Dragons
	Report

Franklin's Gardens
Attendance: 12,209
Referee: Sean Davey (England)

13 November 2010
13:00

Gloucester (England)	36–10	(England) Saracens
	Report

Kingsholm Stadium
Attendance: 10,120
Referee: C Hayes (England)

14 November 2010
14:30

London Irish (England)	16–25	(Wales) Scarlets
	Report

Madejski Stadium
Attendance: 9,795
Referee: Greg Garner (England)

14 November 2010
15:00

Leeds Carnegie (England)	17–23	(England) Sale Sharks
	Report

Headingley Stadium
Attendance: 3,184
Referee: Tim Wigglesworth (England)

==== Round 3 ====
28 January 2011
19:45

Sale Sharks (England)	20–28	(Wales) Newport Gwent Dragons
	Report

Edgeley Park
Attendance: 5,126
Referee: Wayne Barnes (England)

29 January 2011
15:00

Scarlets (Wales)	7–34	(England) Saracens
	Report

Parc y Scarlets
Attendance: 6,610
Referee: Llyr Ap Geraint-Roberts (England)

30 January 2011
15:00

Leeds Carnegie (England)	16–30	(England) Gloucester
	Report

Headingley Stadium
Attendance: 1,498
Referee: Leighton Hodges (Wales)

30 January 2011
15:00

London Irish (England)	37–20	(England) Northampton Saints
	Report

Madejski Stadium
Attendance: 8,636
Referee: James Jones (Wales)

==== Round 4 ====
3 February 2011
19:15

Newport Gwent Dragons (Wales)	26–9	(Wales) Scarlets
	Report

Rodney Parade
Attendance: 4,628
Referee: Greg Garner (England)

5 February 2011
15:00

Gloucester (England)	41–8	(England) London Irish
	Report

Kingsholm Stadium
Attendance: 10,686
Referee: Gwyn Morris (Wales)

5 February 2011
15:00

Northampton Saints (England)	38–24	(England) Leeds Carnegie
	Report

Franklin's Gardens
Attendance: 13,456
Referee: Sean Davey (England)

6 February 2011
15:00

Saracens (England)	50–7	(England) Sale Sharks
	Report

Vicarage Road
Attendance: 5,014
Referee: Leighton Hodges (Wales)

== Knock–out stage ==
Semi-finals
13 March 2011 – Kingsholm
(England) Gloucester	45
(Wales) Newport Gwent Dragons	17
11 March 2011 – The Stoop
(England) Harlequins	20
(England) Newcastle Falcons	21

Final
20 March 2011 – Franklin's Gardens
(England) Gloucester	34
(England) Newcastle Falcons	7

=== Qualification criteria ===
The top teams from each pool qualify for the knockout stages. The pool winners will be decided by the following criteria:

1. The pool winner will be the club with the highest number of match points in each pool. The pool winners will be ranked 1 to 4 by reference to the number of match points earned in the pools.
2. If two or more clubs in the same pool end the pool stage equal on match points, then the order in which they have finished will be determined by:

i. the greater number of matches won by the club and
ii. if the number of matches won is equal, the club with the greater total number of tries scored and
iii. if the total number of tries scored is equal, the club with the greater points difference (points scored for, less points scored against) and
iv. if the points difference is equal, the club with the fewer number of red cards and
v. if the number of red cards is the same, by the toss a coin.

Each of the four qualifying clubs shall be ranked as above and shall play each other as follows:

Semi-final 1 – 1st ranked club v 4th ranked club
Semi-final 2 – 2nd ranked club v 3rd ranked club

The first club listed in each of the semi-final matches shall be the home club.

Qualifiers
Pos	Team	Pld	W	D	L	PF	PA	PD	T	TB	LB	Pts
1	(England) Harlequins	4	4	0	0	123	65	+58	13	1	0	17
2	(England) Gloucester	4	3	0	1	119	52	+67	18	3	1	16
3	(Wales) Newport Gwent Dragons	4	3	0	1	75	69	+6	8	0	0	12
4	(England) Newcastle Falcons	4	2	0	2	61	59	+2	6	0	1	9

=== Semi-finals ===
11 March 2011
20:00

Harlequins (England)	20–21	(England) Newcastle Falcons
Try: Dickson 1' c Brown 70' c Con: Clegg (2/2); Pen: Clegg (2/2) 5', 22'	Report	Try: Gopperth 56' c Tuʻipulotu 80' m Con: Gopperth (1/2); Pen: Gopperth (3/3) 6', 36', 64'

The Stoop, London
Attendance: 6,555
Referee: Nigel Owens (Wales)

13 March 2011
13:00

Gloucester (England)	45–17	(Wales) Newport Gwent Dragons
Try: Hazell 3' m Fuimaono-Sapolu 11' c Robinson 32' m Sharples (4) 44' c, 53' c, 56' c, 64' c Con: Robinson (5/7) 11', 44', 53', 56', 64'	Report	Try: A. Jones 50' m Brew 71' m Groves 78' c Con: Tovey (1/3) 78'

Kingsholm Stadium, Gloucester
Attendance: 12,533
Referee: Christophe Berdos (France)

=== Final ===
20 March 2011
15:30

Gloucester (England)	34–7	(England) Newcastle Falcons
Try: Voyce 6' c Fuimaono-Sapolu 57' c Sharples 66' c Dawidiuk 80' c Con: Robinson (4/4) 6', 57', 66', 80'; Pen: Robinson (2/2) 20', 51'	Report	Try: Eves 74' c Con: Gopperth (1/1) 74'

Franklin's Gardens, Northampton
Attendance: 6,848
Referee: Dave Pearson (England)

FB	15	(England) Olly Morgan
RW	14	(England) Charlie Sharples
OC	13	(New Zealand) Tim Molenaar
IC	12	(Samoa) Eliota Fuimaono-Sapolu
LW	11	(England) Tom Voyce
FH	10	(Wales) Nicky Robinson
SH	9	(England) Jordi Pasqualin
N8	8	(England) Luke Narraway (c)
OF	7	(England) Andy Hazell
BF	6	(Fiji) Akapusi Qera
RL	5	(England) Alex Brown
LL	4	(Scotland) Jim Hamilton
TP	3	(England) Rupert Harden
HK	2	(France) Olivier Azam
LP	1	(England) Nick Wood
Replacements:
HK	16	(England) Darren Dawidiuk
PR	17	(England) Yann Thomas
PR	18	(England) Shaun Knight
LK	19	(Wales) Will James
FL	20	(England) Matt Cox
FH	21	(England) Tim Taylor
FB	22	(England) Freddie Burns
CE	23	(England) Henry Trinder
Coach:
(Scotland) Bryan Redpath

FB	15	(England) Alex Tait
RW	14	(England) Luke Fielden
OC	13	(New Zealand) Tane Tuʻipulotu
IC	12	(England) James Fitzpatrick
LW	11	(England) Luke Eves
FH	10	(New Zealand) Jimmy Gopperth
SH	9	(England) Micky Young
N8	8	(Scotland) Ally Hogg
OF	7	(New Zealand) Brent Wilson
BF	6	(England) Tim Swinson
RL	5	(New Zealand) Andrew van der Heijden
LL	4	(England) James Hudson (c)
TP	3	(England) Kieran Brookes
HK	2	(England) Matt Thompson
LP	1	(England) Jon Golding
Replacements:
HK	16	(England) Rob Vickers
PR	17	(Scotland) Grant Shiells
PR	18	(England) James Hall
LK	19	(Samoa) Filipo Levi
FL	20	(England) Mark Wilson
SH	21	(England) Hall Charlton
CE	22	(South Africa) Gcobani Bobo
FB	23	(England) Tom Catterick
Coach:
(Scotland) Alan Tait

Touch judges:
Wayne Barnes (England)
Paul Dix (England)

== Top scorers ==
=== Top points scorers ===
Rank	Player	Team	Points
1	(New Zealand) Nick Evans	(England) Harlequins	48
2	(England) Charlie Sharples	(England) Gloucester	40
3	(Wales) Matthew Jones	(Wales) Newport Gwent Dragons	35
4	(Wales) Matthew Morgan	(Wales) Ospreys	33
5	(England) Olly Barkley	(England) Bath	25
6	(England) Mark van Gisbergen	(England) London Wasps	23
7	(Wales) Steven Shingler	(Wales) Scarlets	22
8	(New Zealand) Jimmy Gopperth	(England) Newcastle Falcons	21
9	(England) Richard Wigglesworth	(England) Saracens	20

=== Top try scorers ===
Rank	Player	Team	Tries
1	(England) Charlie Sharples	(England) Gloucester	8
2	(Samoa) Jonny Fa'amatuainu	(Wales) Scarlets	3
2	(Wales) Adam Hughes	(Wales) Newport Gwent Dragons	3
2	(England) Sam Smith	(England) Harlequins	3
2	(United States) Chris Wyles	(England) Saracens	3

== See also ==
- 2010–11 English Premiership (rugby union)
- 2010–11 Celtic League
