= John Howard (disambiguation) =

John Howard (born 1939) was Prime Minister of Australia from 1996 to 2007.

John Howard may also refer to:

== Other politicians ==
- John Howard (died 1437) (1366–1437), MP for Essex, Cambridgeshire and Suffolk
- John Howard (MP for Faversham) (1863–1911), British Member of Parliament for Faversham 1900–1906
- John Howard (Southampton Test MP) (1913–1982), British Member of Parliament, 1955–1964
- John Eager Howard (1752–1827), U.S. Senator from Maryland
- John J. Howard (1869–1941), New York politician
- John Morgan Howard (1837–1891), British judge and Conservative Party politician

== Actors ==
- John Howard (Australian actor) (born 1952), Australian actor
- John Howard (American actor) (1913–1995), American actor

== Sports ==
- John Howard (cyclist) (born 1947), Olympic cyclist who set a land speed record on a pedal bicycle
- John Howard (Canadian sprinter) (1888–1937), Canadian athlete who ran in the 1912 Summer Olympics
- John Howard (fighter) (born 1983), mixed martial arts fighter
- John Howard (lacrosse) (1934–2007), American educator and lacrosse player and coach
- John Howard (Micronesian sprinter) (born 1981), Micronesian sprinter
- John Howard (adventure racer), New Zealander considered the pioneer of adventure racing
- John Obed Howard (1928–1975), Canadian lightweight boxer
- Johnny Howard (born 1980), English rugby union player

== Architects ==
- John George Howard (1803–1890), born John Corby, Canadian architect
- John Galen Howard (1864–1931), American architect in the early 20th century

== Musicians ==
- John Howard (singer-songwriter) (born 1953), English singer-songwriter and pianist
- John Tasker Howard (1890–1964), American music historian and composer

== Science and engineering ==
- John Howard (automotive engineer), British Formula One engineer
- John Howard (civil engineer) (1901–1986), British civil engineer
- John Howard (industrialist) (1791–1878), British industrialist
- John Howard (mathematician) (1753–1799), Scottish mathematician
- John Howard (NIOSH director), American public health administrator
- John Howard (optical physicist) (1921–2015), president of the Optical Society of America in 1991
- John Eliot Howard (1807–1883), English chemist

== Military ==
- John Howard (British Army officer) (1912–1999), best known for leading a vital assault during D-Day in the Second World War
- John Howard, 1st Duke of Norfolk (c. 1425–1485), Duke of Norfolk and Lord High Admiral
- John Howard, 15th Earl of Suffolk (1739–1820), British soldier and nobleman
- John Martin Howard (1917–1942), United States Navy officer

== Others ==
- John Howard (author) (born 1961), English author
- John Howard (prison reformer) (1726–1790), English prison reformer of the 18th century
  - John Howard Society of Canada
- John Howard, a minor character in Marvel Comics
- John C. Howard (1930–1983), American film editor
- John D. Howard, American businessman and private equity investor, head of Irving Place Capital
- John Curtois Howard (1887–1970), Chief Justice of Ceylon, 1939–1945
- John Langley Howard (1902–1999), American artist, muralist, printmaker and illustrator
- John Howard (born 1951), bishop of Episcopal Diocese of Florida
- John P. Howard III (born 1984), American lawyer and judge

== See also ==
- John Wagner (born 1949), comics writer who used the nom de plume John Howard
- Jack Howard (disambiguation)
- Jon Howard (born 1985), musician
- Jonathan Howard (disambiguation)
