= Rob Fidler =

England international rugby union player

Robert John Fidler (born 21 September 1974 (age 50) in Cheltenham, Gloucestershire) is a former rugby union footballer, lock forward who played for Bath and Gloucester. He also played two international matches for England against New Zealand and South Africa on the 1998 "tour of hell". He is the son of former England international John Fidler.

Whilst at Gloucester he started in the 2002 Zurich Championship Final (the year before winning the play-offs constituted winning the English title) in which Gloucester defeated Bristol Rugby, and the 2003 Powergen Cup Final in which Gloucester defeated Northampton Saints.
