= 2001–02 Premiership Rugby =

Rugby union competition in England

2001-2002 Zurich Premiership
- Countries: England
- Champions: Leicester Tigers (6th title)
- Runners-up: Sale Sharks
- Relegated: None
- Matches played: 139
- Attendance: 1,043,625 (average 7,508 per match)

The 2001-02 Zurich Premiership was the 15th season of the top flight of the English domestic rugby union competitions.

Leeds Tykes were promoted to replace the relegated Rotherham.

Halfway through the season, with Leicester odds-on to win their fourth title in succession, it was decided that the winners of the playoffs would be crowned champions. After a public outcry at moving the goalposts halfway through the tournament, this was not followed through. Instead, they launched the Zurich Championship, a play off competition involving 8 teams below the champions, providing the winner with a 'wildcard' European qualification. Leicester did finish top of the league and were crowned champions; their fourth title in succession and their sixth overall. Gloucester won the eight team Zurich Championship play-offs in 2001–02.

Leeds Tykes finished bottom of the table but avoided relegation due to the inadequacies of Rotherham's ground.

== Participating teams ==
Locations of the 2001-02 Zurich Premiership teams

Team	Stadium	Capacity	City/Area
Bath	Recreation Ground	8,500	Bath, Somerset
Bristol Shoguns	Memorial Stadium	8,500 (1,200 seats)	Bristol
Gloucester	Kingsholm	11,000	Gloucester, Gloucestershire
Harlequins	The Stoop	9,000 (2,000 seats)	Twickenham, London
Leeds Tykes	Headingley Stadium	22,250	Leeds, West Yorkshire
Leicester Tigers	Welford Road	16,250	Leicester, Leicestershire
London Irish	Madejski Stadium	24,161	Reading, Berkshire
London Wasps	Loftus Road	18,439	Shepherd's Bush, London
Newcastle Falcons	Kingston Park	8,000	Newcastle upon Tyne, Tyne and Wear
Northampton Saints	Franklin's Gardens	11,700	Northampton, Northamptonshire
Sale Sharks	Heywood Road	4,800	Sale, Greater Manchester
Saracens	Vicarage Road	22,000	Watford, Hertfordshire

== Table ==
Pos	Team	Pld	W	D	L	PF	PA	PD	TF	TA	TB	LB	Pts	Qualification
1	Leicester Tigers (C)	22	18	0	4	658	349	+309	72	19	10	1	83	Playoffs and 2002–03 Heineken Cup
2	Sale Sharks	22	14	1	7	589	517	+72	67	47	9	2	69	Playoffs and 2002–03 Heineken Cup
3	Gloucester	22	14	0	8	692	485	+207	68	45	8	4	68	Playoffs and 2002–03 Heineken Cup
4	London Irish	22	11	3	8	574	465	+109	46	37	3	4	57	Playoffs and 2002–03 Heineken Cup
5	Northampton Saints	22	12	1	9	506	426	+80	48	36	4	2	56	Playoffs and 2002–03 Heineken Cup
6	Newcastle Falcons	22	12	1	9	490	458	+32	43	40	3	3	56	Playoffs and 2002–03 Challenge Cup
7	London Wasps	22	12	0	10	519	507	+12	42	41	3	3	54	Playoffs and 2002–03 Challenge Cup
8	Bristol Shoguns	22	9	1	12	591	632	−41	55	66	7	5	50	Playoffs and 2002–03 Heineken Cup
9	Harlequins	22	5	3	14	434	507	−73	33	52	5	4	35	2002–03 Challenge Cup
10	Saracens	22	7	0	15	425	671	−246	33	68	1	5	34	2002–03 Challenge Cup
11	Bath	22	7	0	15	311	524	−213	21	47	0	5	33	2002–03 Challenge Cup
12	Leeds Tykes (Note: Leeds were reprieved of relegation due to inadequacies of Rotherham's ground.)	22	6	0	16	406	654	−248	38	68	2	2	28	2002–03 Challenge Cup

Source: Guinness Premiership

== Results ==
=== Week 1 ===
1 September 2001
15:00

Gloucester	22 - 9	Northampton Saints

Kingsholm
Attendance: 8,682

1 September 2001
15:00

NEC Harlequins	21 - 32	London Irish

Twickenham Stoop
Attendance: 7,287

2 September 2001
14:00

Newcastle Falcons	19 - 16	Leicester Tigers

Kingston Park
Attendance: 7,490

2 September 2001
14:30

Leeds Tykes	10 - 6	Bath Rugby

Headingley
Attendance: 5,181

2 September 2001
15:00

Bristol Shoguns	25 - 35	Sale Sharks

Memorial Stadium
Attendance: 4,020

2 September 2001
15:00

London Wasps	12 - 8	Saracens

Loftus Road
Attendance: 5,929

=== Week 2 ===
8 September 2001
14:00

NEC Harlequins	32 - 38	Bristol Shoguns

Twickenham Stoop
Attendance: 5,220

8 September 2001
14:00

Saracens	34 - 30	Gloucester

Vicarage Road
Attendance: 7,262

8 September 2001
14:15

Leicester Tigers	45 - 15	London Wasps

Welford Road
Attendance: 13,837

8 September 2001
15:00

Northampton Saints	26 - 7	Bath Rugby

Franklin’s Gardens
Attendance: 10,241

8 September 2001
15:00

Sale Sharks	37 - 11	Newcastle Falcons

Heywood Road
Attendance: 4,865

9 September 2001
15:00

London Irish	42 - 14	Leeds Tykes

Madejski Stadium
Attendance: 4,219

=== Week 3 ===
15 September 2001
14:15

Bath Rugby	20 - 27	Saracens

Recreation Ground
Attendance: 7,968

15 September 2001
15:00

Gloucester	18 - 40	Leicester Tigers

Kingsholm
Attendance: 9,729

16 September 2001
14:30

Leeds Tykes	6 - 26	Northampton Saints

Headingley
Attendance: 4,080

16 September 2001
14:30

Newcastle Falcons	6 - 6	NEC Harlequins

Kingston Park
Attendance: 5,551

16 September 2001
15:00

Bristol Shoguns	19 - 19	London Irish

Memorial Stadium
Attendance: 4,000

16 September 2001
15:00

London Wasps	21 - 40	Sale Sharks

Loftus Road
Attendance: 4,403

=== Week 4 ===
22 September 2001
13:00

Leicester Tigers	48 - 9	Bath Rugby

Welford Road
Attendance: 15,145

22 September 2001
15:00

NEC Harlequins	33 - 13	London Wasps

Twickenham Stoop
Attendance: 6,698

22 September 2001
15:00

Sale Sharks	21 - 44	Gloucester

Heywood Road
Attendance: 4,682

23 September 2001
15:00

Bristol Shoguns	34 - 29	Leeds Tykes

Memorial Stadium
Attendance: 3,632

23 September 2001
15:00

London Irish	18 - 22	Newcastle Falcons

Madejski Stadium
Attendance: 5,419

23 September 2001
15:00

Saracens	25 - 20	Northampton Saints

Vicarage Road
Attendance: 8,527

=== Week 5 ===
13 October 2001
14:15

Bath Rugby	20 - 17	Sale Sharks

Recreation Ground
Attendance: 7,875

13 October 2001
15:00

Gloucester	33 - 7	NEC Harlequins

Kingsholm
Attendance: 8,005

13 October 2001
15:00

Northampton Saints	11 - 21	Leicester Tigers

Franklin’s Gardens
Attendance: 11,700

14 October 2001
13:30

London Wasps	15 - 20	London Irish

Loftus Road
Attendance: 5,101

14 October 2001
14:30

Leeds Tykes	27 - 14	Saracens

Headingley
Attendance: 3,328

14 October 2001
14:30

Newcastle Falcons	37 - 20	Bristol Shoguns

Kingston Park
Attendance: 4,401

=== Week 6 ===
20 October 2001
12:35

Sale Sharks	34 - 14	Northampton Saints

Heywood Road
Attendance: 3,612

20 October 2001
13:00

Leicester Tigers	36 - 10	Saracens

Welford Road
Attendance: 13,762

20 October 2001
13:00

NEC Harlequins	15 - 8	Bath Rugby

Twickenham Stoop
Attendance: 5,428

21 October 2001
14:30

Newcastle Falcons	19 - 8	Leeds Tykes

Kingston Park
Attendance: 4,248

21 October 2001
15:00

Bristol Shoguns	43 - 22	London Wasps

Memorial Stadium
Attendance: 4,174

21 October 2001
15:00

London Irish	19 - 15	Gloucester

Madejski Stadium
Attendance: 5,937

=== Week 7 ===
9 November 2001
19:30

Northampton Saints	13 - 13	NEC Harlequins

Franklin’s Gardens
Attendance: 8,667

10 November 2001
12:30

Gloucester	51 - 17	Bristol Shoguns

Kingsholm
Attendance: 8,431

11 November 2001
14:15

Bath Rugby	19 - 11	London Irish

Recreation Ground
Attendance: 7,656

11 November 2001
14:30

Leeds Tykes	37 - 16	Leicester Tigers

Headingley
Attendance: 7,162

11 November 2001
15:00

London Wasps	30 - 33	Newcastle Falcons

Loftus Road
Attendance: 3,955

11 November 2001
15:00

Saracens	26 - 25	Sale Sharks

Vicarage Road
Attendance: 6,059

=== Week 8 ===
16 November 2001
19:45

NEC Harlequins	43 - 6	Saracens

Twickenham Stoop
Attendance: 6,450

17 November 2001
12:30

Sale Sharks	3 - 37	Leicester Tigers

Heywood Road
Attendance: 5,429

18 November 2001
14:05

London Wasps	64 - 14	Leeds Tykes

Loftus Road
Attendance: 3,507

18 November 2001
14:30

Newcastle Falcons	18 - 16	Gloucester

Kingston Park
Attendance: 5,576

18 November 2001
15:00

Bristol Shoguns	31 - 17	Bath Rugby

Memorial Stadium
Attendance: 10,021

18 November 2001
15:00

London Irish	48 - 12	Northampton Saints

Madejski Stadium
Attendance: 5,191

=== Week 9 ===
22 November 2001
19:45

Saracens	13 - 55	London Irish

Vicarage Road
Attendance: 5,216

23 November 2001
19:30

Gloucester	43 - 13	London Wasps

Kingsholm
Attendance: 10,171

23 November 2001
19:30

Leicester Tigers	23 - 18	NEC Harlequins

Welford Road
Attendance: 16,017

25 November 2001
14:15

Bath Rugby	24 - 9	Newcastle Falcons

Recreation Ground
Attendance: 7,903

25 November 2001
14:30

Leeds Tykes	20 - 47	Sale Sharks

Headingley
Attendance: 3,489

25 November 2001
14:30

Northampton Saints	20 - 23	Bristol Shoguns

Franklin’s Gardens
Attendance: 7,873

=== Week 10 ===
1 December 2001
14:00

Gloucester	58 - 17	Leeds Tykes

Kingsholm
Attendance: 7,516

1 December 2001
15:00

NEC Harlequins	16 - 23	Sale Sharks

Twickenham Stoop
Attendance: 5,841

2 December 2001
14:30

Newcastle Falcons	13 - 28	Northampton Saints

Kingston Park
Attendance: 5,048

2 December 2001
15:00

Bristol Shoguns	22 - 25	Saracens

Memorial Stadium
Attendance: 4,450

2 December 2001
15:00

London Irish	15 - 30	Leicester Tigers

Madejski Stadium
Attendance: 11,124

2 December 2001
15:00

London Wasps	23 - 10	Bath Rugby

Loftus Road
Attendance: 6,240

=== Week 11 ===
8 December 2001
14:05

Sale Sharks	19 - 19	London Irish

Heywood Road
Attendance: 4,775

8 December 2001
14:15

Bath Rugby	12 - 9	Gloucester

Recreation Ground
Attendance: 8,200

8 December 2001
14:15

Leicester Tigers	26 - 19	Bristol Shoguns

Welford Road
Attendance: 15,519

8 December 2001
15:00

Northampton Saints	23 - 10	London Wasps

Franklin’s Gardens
Attendance: 8,833

9 December 2001
14:00

Saracens	19 - 24	Newcastle Falcons

Vicarage Road
Attendance: 7,294

9 December 2001
14:30

Leeds Tykes	23 - 18	NEC Harlequins

Headingley
Attendance: 3,401

=== Week 12 ===
22 December 2001
14:00

NEC Harlequins	21 - 38	Leicester Tigers

Twickenham Stoop
Attendance: 9,000

23 December 2001
15:00

London Irish	30 - 23	Saracens

Madejski Stadium
Attendance: 8,246

=== Week 13 ===
27 December 2001
15:00

Leicester Tigers	33 - 10	Sale Sharks

Welford Road
Attendance: 16,250

29 December 2001
14:00

Bath Rugby	15 - 9	Bristol Shoguns

Recreation Ground
Attendance: 8,200

29 December 2001
14:00

Gloucester	29 - 25	Newcastle Falcons

Kingsholm
Attendance: 11,000

29 December 2001
15:00

Northampton Saints	24 - 15	London Irish

Franklin’s Gardens
Attendance: 10,322

30 December 2001
14:30

Leeds Tykes	18 - 28	London Wasps

Headingley
Attendance: 5,166

30 December 2001
15:00

Saracens	39 - 25	NEC Harlequins

Vicarage Road
Attendance: 13,257

=== Week 14 ===
26 January 2002
15:00

NEC Harlequins	16 - 24	Northampton Saints

Twickenham Stoop
Attendance: 5,882

27 January 2002
13:00

Newcastle Falcons	22 - 23	London Wasps

Kingston Park
Attendance: 4,658

=== Week 15 ===
9 February 2002
14:15

Bath Rugby	18 - 9	NEC Harlequins

Recreation Ground
Attendance: 8,200

9 February 2002
15:00

Gloucester	29 - 22	London Irish

Kingsholm
Attendance: 10,112

9 February 2002
15:00

Northampton Saints	10 - 20	Sale Sharks

Franklin’s Gardens
Attendance: 9,389

9 February 2002
18:30

Saracens	7 - 48	Leicester Tigers

Vicarage Road
Attendance: 9,347

10 February 2002
14:30

Leeds Tykes	9 - 19	Newcastle Falcons

Headingley
Attendance: 4,195

10 February 2002
15:00

London Wasps	34 - 16	Bristol Shoguns

Loftus Road
Attendance: 5,429

=== Week 16 ===
23 February 2002
13:30

Sale Sharks	20 - 14	Bath Rugby

Heywood Road
Attendance: 5,392

23 February 2002
14:15

Leicester Tigers	17 - 6	Northampton Saints

Welford Road
Attendance: 16,251

23 February 2002
15:00

NEC Harlequins	6 - 18	Gloucester

Twickenham Stoop
Attendance: 8,000

24 February 2002
15:00

Bristol Shoguns	33 - 17	Newcastle Falcons

Memorial Stadium
Attendance: 5,021

24 February 2002
15:00

London Irish	31 - 17	London Wasps

Madejski Stadium
Attendance: 7,848

24 February 2002
15:00

Saracens	15 - 37	Leeds Tykes

Vicarage Road
Attendance: 4,325

=== Week 17 ===
9 March 2002
14:15

Bath Rugby	9 - 27	Leicester Tigers

Recreation Ground
Attendance: 8,200

9 March 2002
15:00

Gloucester	42 - 14	Sale Sharks

Kingsholm
Attendance: 9,461

10 March 2002
14:30

Leeds Tykes	24 - 6	Bristol Shoguns

Headingley
Attendance: 2,034

=== Week 18 ===
16 March 2002
15:00

Leicester Tigers	27 - 10	Gloucester

Welford Road
Attendance: 16,250

16 March 2002
15:00

London Irish	24 - 13	Bristol Shoguns

Madejski Stadium
Attendance: 12,873

16 March 2002
15:00

NEC Harlequins	33 - 19	Newcastle Falcons

Twickenham Stoop
Attendance: 6,525

16 March 2002
15:00

Northampton Saints	34 - 14	Leeds Tykes

Franklin’s Gardens
Attendance: 8,366

16 March 2002
15:00

Sale Sharks	27 - 22	London Wasps

Heywood Road
Attendance: 5,118

17 March 2002
15:00

Saracens	33 - 11	Bath Rugby

Vicarage Road
Attendance: 10,828

=== Week 19 ===
30 March 2002
14:00

Gloucester	36 - 13	Saracens

Kingsholm
Attendance: 9,262

30 March 2002
14:15

Bath Rugby	11 - 29	Northampton Saints

Recreation Ground
Attendance: 8,200

31 March 2002
14:30

Leeds Tykes	24 - 29	London Irish

Headingley
Attendance: 3,392

31 March 2002
14:30

Newcastle Falcons	30 - 10	Sale Sharks

Kingston Park
Attendance: 6,512

31 March 2002
15:00

Bristol Shoguns	43 - 27	NEC Harlequins

Memorial Stadium
Attendance: 5,618

31 March 2002
15:00

London Wasps	36 - 24	Leicester Tigers

Loftus Road
Attendance: 9,621

=== Week 20 ===
10 April 2002
19:30

London Wasps	44 - 9	Gloucester

Loftus Road
Attendance: 5,769

10 April 2002
20:00

London Irish	31 - 15	Bath Rugby

Madejski Stadium
Attendance: 6,055

13 April 2002
14:15

Bath Rugby	23 - 12	Leeds Tykes

Recreation Ground
Attendance: 8,129

13 April 2002
14:30

Northampton Saints	58 - 21	Gloucester

Franklin’s Gardens
Attendance: 9,138

13 April 2002
15:00

Leicester Tigers	20 - 12	Newcastle Falcons

Welford Road
Attendance: 16,250

13 April 2002
15:00

Sale Sharks	53 - 47	Bristol Shoguns

Heywood Road
Attendance: 3,609

14 April 2002
15:00

London Irish	18 - 18	NEC Harlequins

Madejski Stadium
Attendance: 6,803

14 April 2002
15:00

Saracens	14 - 20	London Wasps

Vicarage Road
Attendance: 10,431

=== Week 21 ===
19 April 2002
19:45

Leicester Tigers	31 - 10	Leeds Tykes

Welford Road
Attendance: 14,145

19 April 2002
19:45

Sale Sharks	23 - 3	Saracens

Heywood Road
Attendance: 3,497

21 April 2002
15:00

Bristol Shoguns	40 - 41	Gloucester

Memorial Stadium
Attendance: 7,066

=== Week 22 ===
26 April 2002
19:35

London Wasps	16 - 6	NEC Harlequins

Loftus Road
Attendance: 8,388

27 April 2002
15:00

Northampton Saints	52 - 27	Saracens

Franklin’s Gardens
Attendance: 8,479

28 April 2002
14:30

Newcastle Falcons	36 - 9	Bath Rugby

Kingston Park
Attendance: 5,430

=== Week 23 ===
3 May 2002
19:45

NEC Harlequins	40 - 16	Leeds Tykes

Twickenham Stoop
Attendance: 7,255

4 May 2002
15:00

Gloucester	68 - 12	Bath Rugby

Kingsholm
Attendance: 11,000

4 May 2002
15:00

London Wasps	17 - 6	Northampton Saints

Loftus Road
Attendance: 6,133

5 May 2002
14:30

Newcastle Falcons	47 - 18	Saracens

Kingston Park
Attendance: 6,083

5 May 2002
15:00

Bristol Shoguns	38 - 21	Leicester Tigers

Memorial Stadium
Attendance: 6,500

5 May 2002
15:00

London Irish	32 - 36	Sale Sharks

Madejski Stadium
Attendance: 6,076

=== Week 24 ===
8 May 2002
19:30

Newcastle Falcons	33 - 28	London Irish

Kingston Park
Attendance: 5,218

8 May 2002
19:45

Sale Sharks	35 - 20	Leeds Tykes

Heywood Road
Attendance: 3,871

8 May 2002
20:00

Bristol Shoguns	27 - 37	Northampton Saints

Memorial Stadium
Attendance: 4,002

12 May 2002
15:00

Bath Rugby	22 - 24	London Wasps

Recreation Ground
Attendance: 8,000

12 May 2002
15:00

Leeds Tykes	17 - 50	Gloucester

Headingley
Attendance: 4,144

12 May 2002
15:00

Leicester Tigers	34 - 16	London Irish

Welford Road
Attendance: 15,800

12 May 2002
15:00

Northampton Saints	24 - 19	Newcastle Falcons

Franklin’s Gardens
Attendance: 9,292

12 May 2002
15:00

Sale Sharks	40 - 11	NEC Harlequins

Heywood Road
Attendance: 5,678

12 May 2002
15:00

Saracens	26 - 28	Bristol Shoguns

Vicarage Road
Attendance: 9,726

== Playoff ==
=== Seeding ===
Seed	Team	Table points	Wins	Points diff
1	Leicester Tigers	83	18	+309
2	Sale Sharks	69	14	+72
3	Gloucester	68	14	+207
4	London Irish	57	11	+109
5	Northampton Saints	56	12	+80
6	Newcastle Falcons	56	12	+32
7	London Wasps	54	12	+12
8	Bristol Shoguns	50	9	−32

=== Quarter-finals ===
18 May 2002

Leicester Tigers	13 – 27	Bristol Shoguns
	Report

Welford Road
Attendance: 4,771
Referee: Chris White

18 May 2002

Gloucester	60 – 9	Newcastle Falcons
	Report

Kingsholm
Attendance: 5,776
Referee: Steve Lander

19 May 2002

London Irish	14 – 38	Northampton Saints
	Report

Madejski Stadium
Attendance: 3,336
Referee: Dave Pearson

19 May 2002

Sale Sharks	43 – 27	London Wasps
	Report

Heywood Road
Attendance: 3,283
Referee: Tony Spreadbury

=== Semi-finals ===
1 June 2002

Bristol Shoguns	32 – 24	Northampton Saints
	report

Memorial Ground
Attendance: 5,292
Referee: Chris White

2 June 2002

Sale Sharks	11 – 33	Gloucester
	Report

Heywood Road
Attendance: 4,298
Referee: Steve Lander

=== Final ===
8 June 2002

Bristol Shoguns	23–28	Gloucester
Try: Pichot; Johnstone; Con: Contepomi (2); Pen: Contepomi (3)	Report	Try: Boer; Con: Mercier; Pen: Mercier (7)

Twickenham Stadium
Attendance: 28,500
Referee: Roy Maybank

Team details

Bristol Shoguns
Gloucester

Lee Best
Jamie Williams
David Rees
Jason Little (c)
Phil Christophers
Felipe Contepomi
Agustin Pichot
Neil McCarthy
Darren Crompton
Julian White
Gareth Archer
Alex Brown
Craig Short
Michael Lipman
Ben Sturnham
Replacements:
Shane Drahm
Paul Johnstone
Ross Beattie
Andrew Sheridan
Coach:
Dean Ryan

Henry Paul
Dylan O'Leary
Terry Fanolua
Robert Todd
Ludovic Mercier
Andy Gomarsall
Patrice Collazo
Tom Beim
Olivier Azam
Phil Vickery (c)
Rob Fidler
James Forrester
Ed Pearce
Jake Boer
Junior Paramore
Replacements:
Chris Catling
Trevor Woodman
Chris Fortey
Craig Gillies
Koli Sewabu
Coach:
Laurent Seigne

== Leading scorers ==
Note: Flags to the left of player names indicate national team as has been defined under World Rugby eligibility rules, or primary nationality for players who have not earned international senior caps. Players may hold one or more non-WR nationalities.

=== Most points ===
Rank	Player	Club	Points
1	(Ireland) Barry Everitt	London Irish	343
2	(France) Ludovic Mercier	Gloucester	334
3	(England) Charlie Hodgson	Sale Sharks	273
4	(Ireland) Paul Burke	Harlequins	258
5	(England) Paul Grayson	Northampton Saints	238
6	(Argentina) Felipe Contepomi	Bristol	221
7	(England) Jonny Wilkinson	Newcastle Falcons	215
8	(England) Tim Stimpson	Leicester Tigers	212
9	(South Africa) Luke Smith	Saracens	194
10	(England) Alex King	Wasps	183

=== Most tries ===
Rank	Player	Club	Tries
1	(England) Mark Cueto	Sale Sharks	13
2	(England) Dan Scarbrough	Leeds Tykes	12
3	(England) Steve Booth	Leicester Tigers	9
3	(Argentina) Felipe Contepomi	Bristol	9
3	(Ireland) Geordan Murphy	Leicester Tigers	9
3	(Samoa) Junior Paramore	Gloucester	9
3	(England) Jason Robinson	Sale Sharks	9
3	(England) James Simpson-Daniel	Gloucester	9
10	(England) Ben Cohen	Northampton Saints	8
10	(England) Michael Stephenson	Newcastle Falcons	8
