= Jonathan Howard =

Jonathan Howard may refer to:

- Jonathan Howard (footballer) (born 1971), English footballer
- Jonathan Howard (actor) (born 1987), English actor
- Jon Howard (born 1985), American musician
- Jonathon Howard, Australian biophysicist and cell biologist
- Jonathan L. Howard, British writer and game designer

== See also ==
- John Howard (disambiguation)
