= Jake Boer =

South African rugby union player (born 1975)

- Full name: Jacobus Francois Boer
- Born: 1 October 1975 (age 50) Cape Town, South Africa
- Height: 6 ft 2 in (188 cm)
- Weight: 238 lb (108 kg)
- School: Wynberg Boys' High School

Rugby union career
- Position: Flanker
Senior career
Years	Team	Apps	(Points)
1997–98	Leicester Tigers		
1998–00	London Irish		
2000–10	Gloucester		

Jacobus Francois Boer (born 1 November 1975) is a South African former professional rugby union player.

== Biography ==
Born in Cape Town, Boer was educated at Wynberg Boys' High School and represented Western Province Schools, alongside future Springboks captain Corné Krige. He competed for Cape Town's Villager club and Western Province "B", with his inability to progress into the Currie Cup side prompting a move to Europe.

Boer, primarily a flanker, joined the Leicester Tigers in 1997, but couldn't get regular game time due to the strength of their back-row and moved on to London Irish. The most successful period of his career came after signing with Gloucester in 2000. He helped Gloucester claim the 2001–02 Premiership Rugby title, scoring the side's only try in their final win over Bristol at Twickenham. Appointed captain the next season, Boer led Gloucester to victory in the 2002–03 Powergen Cup and was named the 2002–03 Zurich Premiership Player of the Season.

Returning to South Africa in 2007, Boer played Currie Cup rugby with Western Province, before resuming at Gloucester in the 2009–10 season. He was captain of Gloucester for their match against the touring 2009 Wallabies.

Boer came into contention for Springboks honours but never got a call up due to being England based.
