= Pierre Capdevielle (rugby union) =

French rugby union player

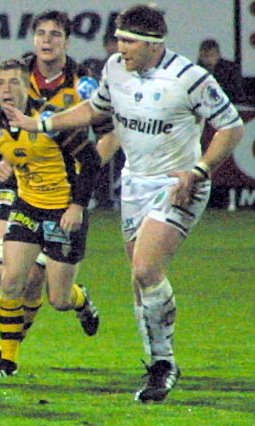
- Born: Pierre Capdevielle; 30 March 1974 (age 52) Oloron-Sainte-Marie, France
- Height: 6 ft 1 in (1.85 m)
- Weight: 19 st 0 lb (121 kg)

Rugby union career
- Position: Prop
Senior career
Years	Team	Apps	(Points)
- CA Périgueux
- ASM Clermont Auvergne
- CA Brive
	Gloucester Rugby	70+	(70)
2001–2009	CA Brive	26	(19)
International career
Years	Team	Apps	(Points)
	France A	3	(0)

Pierre Capdevielle (born Oloron-Sainte-Marie, 30 March 1974) is a French former rugby union footballer of the 1990s and 2000s, who played for Gloucester Rugby in the Aviva Premiership during the 2009-10 Guinness Premiership and the 2010-11 Aviva Premiership seasons, as a prop.

Capped three times for France A, Capdevielle started his career with two seasons at Périgueux before joining ASM Clermont Auvergne. He moved to Brive in 2001 and played his part in the resurgence of the club following their relegation from the Top 14 in 2000 making more than 70 first team appearances.

Capdevielle signed for Gloucester from Brive in the summer of 2009.
