= Peter Ford (rugby union) =

England international rugby union player (born 1932)

- Full name: Peter John Ford
- Born: 2 May 1932 (age 94) Gloucester, England
- School: Central School, Gloucester

Rugby union career
- Position: Flanker
Senior career
Years	Team	Apps	(Points)
1951-1968	Gloucester RFC	507	(487)
International career
Years	Team	Apps	(Points)
1964	England	4	(0)

Peter John Ford (born 2 May 1932) is an English former rugby union international.

A native of Gloucester, Ford was a blind side flanker and debuted for Gloucester RFC in 1951. By the age of 23, he had been elevated to the club captaincy, which he served in for five seasons. He was a member of the Western Counties team that beat the Wallabies at Bristol in 1957 and four years later captained the representative side against the Springboks. His England call up didn't come until late in his career and he was capped four times, all in the 1964 Five Nations. He continued playing for Gloucester until 1968 and became the first player from the club to appear in 500 games.

Ford has held various administrative roles at Gloucester since retiring, including club chairman and president. He was previously the Gloucestershire representative on the RFU committee, serving four years as an England selector.

== See also ==
- List of England national rugby union players
