= George Halford (rugby union) =

England international rugby union player

- Full name: Jonathan George Halford
- Born: 27 April 1886 Gloucester, England
- Died: 30 May 1960 (aged 74) Stroud, England

Rugby union career
- Position: Second-row
International career
Years	Team	Apps	(Points)
1920	England	2	(0)

Jonathan George Halford (27 April 1886 – 30 May 1960) was an English international rugby union player.

Born in Gloucester, Halford was the son of a blacksmith's assistant, widely known by the nickname "Biddy".

Halford, a second-row forward, made his debut for Gloucester in 1907-08, following a period of army service. He was captain for the 1913-14 season, then during the war served as a private with the 1st Battalion of the Gloucestershire Regiment, arriving in 1914 at Le Havre. During fighting in France in early 1915, Halford was erroneously reported as having been killed, but had instead suffered shrapnel injuries and recovered in an English hospital.

After the war, Halford resumed as Gloucester captain and in his first season back won an England call up, gaining caps against Wales and France during the 1920 Five Nations. He finished his career with 34 county appearances for Gloucestershire, which included four County Championship titles, and remained with Gloucester until 1923.

Halford's great-grandson, Alex Seville, was an England under-20 representative player.

== See also ==
- List of England national rugby union players
