= Red House School =

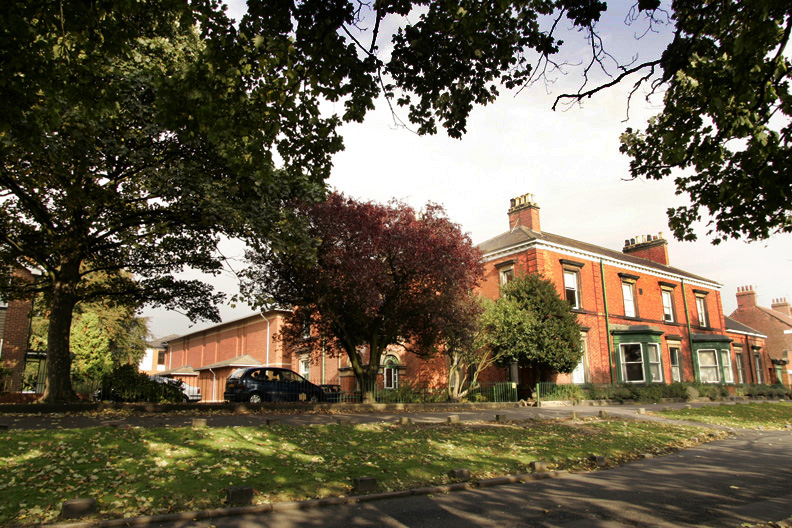

Location
- 36 The Green; Norton, Stockton-on-Tees, TS20 1DX; England; 54.594171°N 1.313252°W

Information
- Type: Independent
- Motto: Veritas in virtute
- Established: 1929; 97 years ago
- Head: Rebecca Ashcroft
- Gender: Co-educational
- Age: 3 to 16
- Enrolment: 267
- School fees: £2270-£2610 (per term)
- Website: www.redhouseschool.co.uk
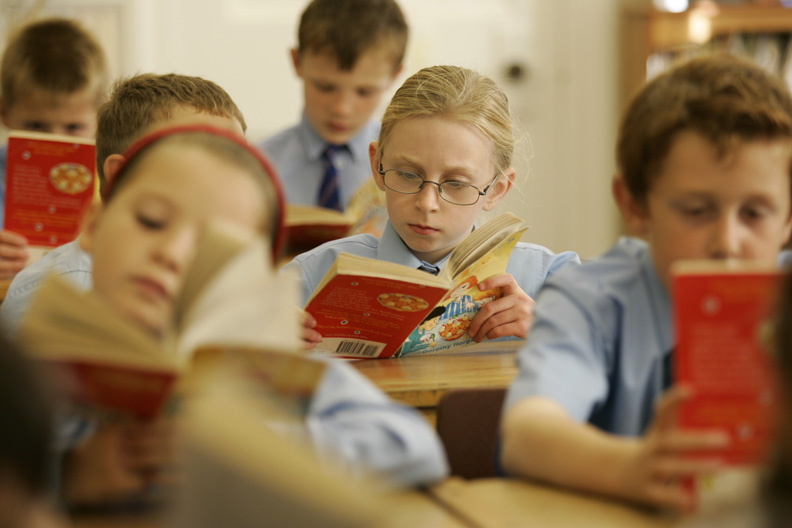

Red House School is a co-educational private day school in Norton, Stockton-on-Tees, in the north-east of England.

Nursery, Reception and Year 1 are located in a purpose-built unit, whilst Years 2, 3 and 4 are in a Georgian Vicarage. The Preparatory School and Senior School are in a manor house.

In 2010 Red House came 1st in the independent secondary school with no sixth form category in The Sunday Times Parent League Tables 2010. A school's place in the Sunday Times league tables is determined by the percentage of its students who achieve A - C grades at GCSE, and A and B grades at A level.

== Notable former pupils ==
- Simon Clarke – politician
- James Simpson-Daniel – Rugby Union player
- Paul Johnston – Cricketer
- Jack Gibbons – pianist & composer
- Russell Earnshaw – rugby union coach
- David Tibet – poet, artist and musician
