= James Forrester (rugby union) =

England international rugby union player

- Born: James Forrester; 9 February 1981 (age 45) Oxford, England
- Height: 6 ft 5 in (1.96 m)
- Weight: 17 st 4 lb (110 kg)
- School: St Edward's School, Oxford

Rugby union career
- Position: Number 8
- Current team: Gloucester Rugby
Youth career
- Bicester Rugby Club
Senior career
Years	Team	Apps	(Points)
1999–2008	Gloucester Rugby	144	(255)
International career
Years	Team	Apps	(Points)
2005	England	2	(0)

James Forrester (born 9 February 1981 in Oxford) is a former English rugby union player who played at number eight for Gloucester Rugby.

Forrester is a tall, agile, talented number eight with excellent ball handling skills and an eye for the try line, as his impressive try tally for Gloucester Rugby demonstrates. Born in Oxford, he learnt his rugby at school and as a mini/junior with Bicester Rugby Club. During his time at St Edward's School, Oxford, he also developed his game and although disappointed at missing out on an England U18 Group Schools cap in 1999, he had more than made up for it by the end of that year when he signed for Gloucester Rugby. Whilst at Gloucester he started in the 2002 Zurich Championship Final (the year before winning the play-offs constituted winning the English title) in which Gloucester defeated Bristol Rugby, and the 2003 Powergen Cup Final in which he scored a try when Gloucester defeated Northampton Saints.

In 2003 Forrester was named PRA Premiership Young Player of the Year as well as Sports Writers Young Player of the year. He was also named in the 37 man training squad for the 2003 World cup before a wrist injury and surgery ruled him unavailable.

Having played for England U21 he made his England A debut against Wales in Bristol during 2002 and in June of that year also played for an England XV against the Barbarians at Twickenham, scoring a memorable 65-metre try and outstripping Jonah Lomu in the process.

He was also capped by the England Sevens squad in 2002, playing in the opening World Series tournament in Dubai and two others and was man of the match with two tries, when England A thrashed Scotland 78–6 in March 2003. He was considered an outside chance for Clive Woodward's 2003 Rugby World Cup squad but was ultimately left out.

Unfortunately, injury has affected his career and he required an elbow operation in 2002–03 and then dislocated his shoulder in 2003–04 in the England A match against France A. In the summer of 2004 he signed a three-year contract to stay at Kingsholm. In 2005 he sneaked his first England cap, against Wales in the RBS 6 Nations, coming on as a blood replacement for Joe Worsley. His second cap came as a replacement in November 2005 against Samoa. Forrester has shown his versatility, in that he has played in all three back-row positions plus centre, including in Gloucester Rugby's 16–24 defeat in the Zurich Premiership wildcard final against Saracens on 14 May 2005. The week previously he scored 2 tries from centre against Newcastle.

On Sunday 21 May 2006 Forrester clinched the European Challenge Cup for Gloucester Rugby with a superb try in extra time at The Stoop. Forrester made an impressive start to the following season scoring 3 tries in 3 games, one of which was against Harlequins at The Stoop again. After a horrific injury towards the end of this season at Ashton Gate Stadium he missed the entire 2007/08 season. On 10 October 2008, it was announced on the Gloucester rugby website that he was to retire with immediate effect as a consequence of this injury.

In late 2008 Gloucester awarded Forrester a Testimonial dinner.

In 2009, Forrester relocated to Singapore with his family where he coached Singapore Premiership team Wanderers to victory, 4 years in a row 2013–2016. Additionally he took up the role of Head Coach for the Singapore Rugby Union Men's 15's & 7's.

In 2013 led Singapore to promotion from division two with a win against a very strong Malaysian side in the final.

In 2014 led Singapore to victory over UAE a team who had finished 2nd in Asia 2 years before. This win guaranteed our place in Div 1 for next year. Unfortunately Singapore had no opportunity to gain promotion as IRB changed the league structure the following year.

In 2011, Forrester launched his own fitness business, UFIT. Initially starting with boot camps, personal training and nutrition consultancy. Later, he opened two Crossfit boxes in Singapore, Crossfit Bukit Timah and Crossfit Tanjong Pagar.

In 2015, UFIT Bootcamps merged with its largest bootcamp rival in Singapore, OZFIT, culminating in UFITs SHEFIT brand. Later that year UFIT opened its 4th facility UFIT One north.

In 2016, UFIT Clinic was born, offering physiotherapy, rehabilitation and sports psychology to clients in Singapore. The most recent addition to UFIT's offerings is UFIT Education & UFIT Academy. UFIT Education trains and develops fitness professionals and offers schools and businesses the opportunity to upskill. UFIT Academy works with young athletes and sports teams.

In 2017 UFIT opened their 3rd Personal training studio in the heart of the city on the famous Orchard Rd, a state of the art 3500 sq ft facility servicing clients around the Orchard area. UFIT also opened a gym within the LinkedIn offices and a 2nd physio therapy clinic at the One North business park. UFIT Clinic

In 2018 UFIT opened their 3rd physio Clinic also in the popular Orchard road location, the space doubles up as a Pilates studio as well. UFIT also opened a personal training gym within the Australian International school, their 10th location on the island.

In May 2018 Forrester won The Fider Singapore entrepreneur of the year award. http://www.thefinder.com.sg/healthy-living/expatpreneur-awards-2018-business-of-the-year-james-forrester-ufit-singapore/
