= Martin St Quinton =

Entrepreneur, Chairman of Gloucester Rugby and Cheltenham Racecourse

- Born: Martin George Saint Quinton; Hull, United Kingdom
- Education: Durham University
- Occupations: Founder of Azzurri Communications; Former Managing Director (UK) of Danka; Former Managing Director of Saint Group Plc
- Years active: 1980-present
- Known for: Chairman - Gloucester Rugby; Chairman - Cheltenham Racecourse
- Spouse: Judith Faughey (m. 1983)
- Children: 4

Martin St Quinton is an entrepreneur who is the chairman of Gloucester Rugby and Cheltenham Racecourse.

== Career ==
In 1980 St Quinton started Saint Group Plc, an office equipment company, which was sold to Danka in 1993. St Quinton served as the UK managing director of Danka, where he worked for over seven years, overseeing photocopier equipment sales exceeding £1bn.

He then founded Azzurri Communications, a UK based voice and data integrator, which grew to 700 staff and £150 million turnover in six years. St Quinton employed Claude Littner as a non-executive director of Azzurri Communications. In 2006 Azzurri was sold for £180 million to the Prudential Group.

St Quinton was named Ernst & Young Entrepreneur of the Year in 2003. He acquired a controlling interest in Gloucester Rugby in 2016 and became its chairman. He is also a race horse owner and in 2019 was appointed chairman of Cheltenham Racecourse, taking over from Robert Waley-Cohen.

== Personal life ==
St Quinton was born in Yorkshire and educated at Pocklington School. He graduated from Durham University in 1979. He and his wife, Judith St Quinton, are trustees of The Fold, a children's home in the Limpopo Province in South Africa.
