= Jack Howard =

Jack Howard may refer to:

- Jack Howard (ice hockey) (1909–1983), Canadian ice hockey defenseman
- Jack Howard (cricketer) (1915–1993), English cricketer
- Jack Howard (sprinter) (born 1981), Micronesian sprinter
- Jack Howard (runner) (born 1987), American middle-distance runner, 800 m All-American for the Notre Dame Fighting Irish track and field team
- Jack Howard (rugby union) (1913–1979), Australian rugby union player
- Jack R. Howard (1910–1998), American broadcasting executive
- St George Henry Rathborne (1854–1938), who wrote under this pseudonym
- Jack Howard, a member of the musical group Hunters & Collectors

== See also ==
- John Howard (disambiguation)
