= Paul Johnston (cricketer) =

English cricketer

Personal information
- Full name: Paul Robert Archibald Johnston
- Born: 13 December 1988 (age 37); Hartlepool, County Durham, England
- Batting: Left-handed
- Bowling: Right-arm medium

Domestic team information
- Years: Team
- 2009–present: Cumberland
- 2008–2009: Durham UCCE

Career statistics
Competition	First-class
Matches	5
Runs scored	164
Batting average	18.22
100s/50s	–/1
Top score	73
Balls bowled	6
Wickets	–
Bowling average	–
5 wickets in innings	–
10 wickets in match	–
Best bowling	–
Catches/stumpings	6/–
- Source: Cricinfo, 26 March 2011

Paul Robert Archibald Johnston (born 13 December 1988) is an English cricketer. Johnston is a left-handed batsman who bowls right-arm medium pace. He was born in Hartlepool, County Durham and educated at Durham University.

He attended Red House School in Norton before going on to Yarm School for college.

Johnston made his first-class debut for Durham UCCE against Derbyshire in 2008 at the County Ground, Derby. He played a further first-class match that season against Durham, before playing three fixtures in 2009, the last of which came against Warwickshire. In his five first-class matches, he scored 164 runs at a batting average of 18.22, with a single half century high score of 73. This came against Warwickshire in his final first-class match.

Johnston joined Cumberland in 2009, making his Minor Counties Championship debut against Lincolnshire and his MCCA Knockout Trophy debut against Cheshire in 2010.
