= Ludovic Mercier =

French rugby union player

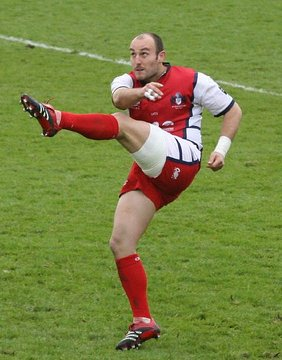
- Born: 1 November 1976 (age 50)
- Height: 1.83 m (6 ft 0 in)
- Weight: 90 kg (14 st 2 lb)

Rugby union career
- Position: Fly half
Senior career
| Years | Team | Apps | (Points) |
| 1993–1994 | Angoulême | | |
| 1994–1998 | Béziers | | |
| 1999–2001 | Aurillac | | |
| 2001–2003 | Gloucester | 105 | (1325) |
| 2003–2004 | Grenoble | 13 | (178) |
| 2004–2005 | Pau | 23 | (279) |
| 2005–2007 | Gloucester | 27 | (263) |
| 2007–2010 | Petrarca Rugby | 50 | (537) |
| 2010 | Aironi | 9 | (56) |
| 2010–2011 | Petrarca Rugby | 12 | (118) |
| 2011–2013 | Saint-Étienne Loire Sud | 31 | (265) |
- Correct as of 3 May 2009
Coaching career
- Years: Team
- 2014–2015: SCO Angers
- 2015–: L'Aquila Rugby

Ludovic Mercier (born 1 November 1976) is a French former rugby union player.

He is a fly half. He was one of the quickest players in history to reach 500 Premiership points; his goal-kicking and place kicking being his particular strengths. Whilst at Gloucester he started in the 2002 Zurich Championship Final (the year before winning the play-offs constituted winning the English title) in which Gloucester defeated Bristol Rugby, scoring one conversion and seven penalties. He also started in the 2003 Powergen Cup Final in which Gloucester defeated Northampton Saints. In the final Mercier scored four conversions, three penalties and a drop goal.

In June 2010 he joined Aironi for their first season in the Celtic League.

== Honours ==
- Gloucester Rugby
  - Anglo-Welsh Cup (2003)
  - European Challenge Cup (2006)
