= John Howard (automotive engineer) =

British engineer

- Education: University of California, Irvine, Oxford Brookes University
- Occupation: Engineer
- Employer: Cadillac Formula 1
- Title: Race engineer

John Howard is a British Formula One engineer. He is currently the race engineer to Valtteri Bottas at the Cadillac Formula 1 team.

== Career ==
Howard graduated from the University of California, Irvine in 2008 with a Bachelor of Science in Mechanical Engineering, before completing a Master of Science in Motorsport Engineering at Oxford Brookes University in 2010. He joined the Enstone-based team later that year as a Mechanical Design Engineer during its period as the Lotus F1 Team. In this role he contributed to general mechanical design, as well as the development of pit equipment and front brake drum assemblies. In 2015 Howard became Engineering Coordinator, moving into a trackside role working closely with the chief mechanic and race engineers to support car preparation and operational delivery at events, remaining with the team when it became the Renault F1 Team.

He transitioned into performance engineering in 2018, serving as Performance Engineer to Carlos Sainz in 2018 and Daniel Ricciardo from 2019 to 2020. He became a senior performance engineer when the team was rebranded as Alpine F1 Team helping to engineer Fernando Alonso from 2021 to 2022, and Pierre Gasly in 2023. He was promoted to Senior Performance Engineer in 2022, focusing on set-up development, data analysis and performance optimisation across both factory and trackside activities. Howard stepped up to Race Engineer in January 2024, partnering Gasly. During the early part of the 2025 season he engineered rookie Jack Doohan for the opening rounds before departing the team.

For 2026 he joined the new Cadillac Formula 1, where he serves as Race Engineer to Valtteri Bottas, forming part of the core trackside group responsible for establishing the squad's engineering operations in its debut season.
