= Matt Lord =

New Zealand rugby union player

Matt Lord (born 7 January 1978) was a rugby union player for Northampton Saints in the Guinness Premiership until 2009.

He played as a lock. Before playing professionally, he played rugby at a school in Taumarunui, New Zealand.
