= James Hall (rugby union, born 1986) =

English rugby union footballer

- Born: James Stephen Hall; 21 July 1986 (age 40) Stoke-on-Trent, Staffordshire, England
- Height: 1.83 m (6 ft 0 in)
- Weight: 120 kg (18 st 13 lb; 265 lb)
- University: Liverpool John Moores University
- Notable relative: Eddie Hall (brother)

Rugby union career
- Position: Prop
Amateur team(s)
Years	Team	Apps	(Points)
2006–2009	Waterloo RFC	44	(15)
Senior career
Years	Team	Apps	(Points)
2009–2010	Coventry R.F.C.	31	(25)
2010–2013	Newcastle Falcons	46	(10)
2013–2017	Bristol Rugby	55	(10)
2018	Nottingham	5	(0)
2018–2019	Dings Crusaders	28	(0)
- Correct as of 1 June 2020
International career
Years	Team	Apps	(Points)
2009	England Students		
Coaching career
- Years: Team
- 2019-: Dings Crusaders (Forwards Coach)

James Hall is an English rugby union player born 1986, Stoke-on-Trent, England. He formerly played for Bristol Rugby in the Aviva Premiership.

== Playing career ==
- Waterloo R.F.C 2006–2009
- Coventry R.F.C. 2009–2010
- Newcastle Falcons 2010–2013
- Bristol Rugby 2013–17

== Honours ==
England Students 2009
