= Adam Greendale =

English rugby union player

- Born: 17 September 1988 (age 38) Beverley, Yorkshire
- Height: 1.74 m (5 ft 9 in)
- Weight: 78 kg (12 st 4 lb)

Rugby union career
- Position: Fly-half
Senior career
Years	Team	Apps	(Points)
2008–09	Leeds Carnegie		
2009–	Newport GD	3	(5)

Adam Greendale (born 17 September 1988) is a professional rugby union player. A fly-half, he is an England Under-19 and Under-20 international. Greendale currently plays for Leeds Carnegie. He previously played for Otley and Rotherham Titans.

In 2009 he was loaned to Bedwas and was selected for the Newport Gwent Dragons regional team against Sale Sharks on 6 November 2009, making his debut as a second-half replacement.
