= Junior Paramore =

Samoa international rugby union & league footballer

- Born: Peter Junior Paramore; 18 November 1968 (age 57) Apia, Samoa
- Height: 199 cm (6 ft 6 in)
- Weight: 104 kg (16 st 5 lb; 229 lb)
- School: Hillary College
- Notable relative: Terry Fanolua (cousin)

Rugby union career
- Position(s): Number 8, Flanker
Amateur team(s)
Years	Team	Apps	(Points)
1987–1989	East Tamaki		
1990–1995	Manurewa		
Senior career
Years	Team	Apps	(Points)
1990–1995	Counties Manukau		
1996–1999	Bedford Blues	48	(70)
1999–2004	Gloucester	122	(135)
2004–2006	Bedford Blues	44	(30)
International career
Years	Team	Apps	(Points)
1991–2001	Samoa	27	(30)
National sevens team
Years	Team		Comps
1991–1994	Samoa 7s		
- Rugby league career

Playing information
- Position: Second-row
Club
Years	Team	Pld	T	G	FG	P
1996	Hunter Mariners	0				0
1996	→ Castleford Tigers	10				12
	Total	10	0	0	0	12

Peter "Junior" Paramore (born 18 November 1968) is a Samoan former professional rugby union international, who also spent time playing professional rugby league.

Paramore was born in Samoa, and raised in New Zealand, playing his rugby in that country until 1995. In 1996, he left for the UK to take up a professional rugby league contract with Castleford Tigers. However, after one season, he moved to Bedford Blues professional rugby union side, helping them achieve promotion to the premiership in 1998. In 1999 he moved to Gloucester Rugby, joining his cousin Terry Fanolua. He remained there for five years, winning the 2002 Zurich Championship Final (the year before winning the play-offs constituted winning the English title) in which Gloucester defeated Bristol Rugby, and the Powergen Cup in 2003, before leaving to rejoin Bedford as a coach in 2004.

During his career, Paramore won 29 caps for the Samoa national rugby union team, taking part in three World Cup campaigns.

He is now the principal of his own rugby academy. He is now a coach at Totton College Rugby academy alongside Budge Pountney. He also coaches rugby at Canford School, in Dorset, England.

In 2018 he left Dorset to come to Bristol Bears rugby team. He is the current kit manager for the Bristol Bears.
