= Gloucester Rugby =

English rugby union club in Gloucester, England

- Full name: Gloucester Rugby
- Union: Gloucestershire Rugby Football Union
- Nickname(s): Cherry and Whites
- Founded: 1873; 153 years ago
- Location: Gloucester, Gloucestershire, England
- Region: South West England
- Ground: Kingsholm Stadium (Capacity: 16,115)
- Chairman: Martin St Quinton
- CEO: Alex Brown
- Director of Rugby: Chris Boyd (Note: Consultant Technical Director, head coach George Skivington reports directly to Boyd.)
- Coach: George Skivington
- Captain: Dewi Lake
- Most appearances: Alan Brinn (574)
- Top scorer: Ludovic Mercier (1325)
- Most tries: James Simpson-Daniel (118)
- League: PREM Rugby
- 2025–26: 8th of 10
Home kit	Away kit	European kit

Largest win
- Gloucester 103–3 Bucuresti (Kingsholm Stadium); 29 October 2005

Largest defeat
- Northampton 90–0 Gloucester (Franklin's Gardens); 14 May 2024

Official website
- gloucesterrugby.co.uk

Gloucester Rugby, commonly referred to as Gloucester, are a professional men's rugby union club based in the West Country city of Gloucester, England. They play in the Gallagher PREM, England's top division of men's rugby union.

Nicknamed the cherry and whites, the club was founded in 1873 as Gloucester Football Club and since 1891 has played its home matches at Kingsholm Stadium in the north of the city, also in 1891 the club became a registered company as The Gloucester Football and Athletic Ground Company Limited. In the 2025–26 Premiership Rugby season, Gloucester finished 8th which earned them a space in the 2026–27 European Rugby Champions Cup. The current head coach is George Skivington who took the role in the summer of 2020, Chris Boyd is the clubs technical director having taken the role in March 2026.

Gloucester have won 8 major titles; four RFU Knockout Cup's in 1971–72, 1977–78, 1981–82 and 2002–03, one Anglo-Welsh Cup win in 2010–11, and one Premiership Rugby Cup win in 2023–24. The Premiership Rugby Cup win in 2024 meant they became the first club to win all three iterations of the English domestic cup competition. Outside of England, Gloucester has also seen success in Europe's second-tier completion having won the EPCR Challenge Cup twice: in 2005–06 and 2014–15. Despite never winning a league title, Gloucester have finished runners-up on four occasions; 1988–89, 1989–90, 2002–03, and most recently in 2006–07.

Although having no official nickname, the club is often referred to as the Cherry and Whites by supporters and the media in reference to the cherry and white hooped shirts worn by the team. Matches with local rivals Bath and Bristol Bears are referred to as West Country derbies.

== History ==
=== Formation and early years ===
The club was formed in 1873 after a meeting at the Spread Eagle Hotel with the announcement in the Gloucester Journal: "A football club (as rugby was then called) has been formed in this city – the season's operations begin at the Spa on the first Tuesday in next month." a team was then organised to play the college school, which was actually played on the current Kingsholm ground.

The club left the Spa after an argument with the cricket club that they were ground sharing with. During the winter, the Rugby Club had used a salt mixture to remove frost from the pitch, resulting in the death of the grass on the wicket. Gloucester were no longer welcome at the Spa ground. They then acquired lands from the Castle Grim Estate for £4,000 in 1891 & have played home fixtures at this site ever since, in the area known as Kingsholm.

Season Records 1873–1924
The Spa Ground Years, 1873–1891																	
Season	Captain	P	W	L	D	Season	Captain	P	W	L	D	Season	Captain	P	W	L	D
1873-84	F. Hartley	No records available				1891-92	T. Bagwell	34	24	6	4	1909-10	A. Hudson	38	23	8	7
1874-75	F. Hartley	No records available				1892-93	W. George	30	16	11	3	1910-11	A. Hudson	40	25	13	2
1875-76	F. Hartley	No records available				1893-94	J. Hanman	29	18	10	1	1911-12	A. Hudson	40	24	12	4
1876-77	J. F. Brown	11	6	3	2	1894-95	J. Hanman	28	14	11	3	1912-13	A. Hudson	39	21	14	4
1877-78	J. F. Brown	15	10	3	2	1895-96	C. Williams	26	8	12	6	1913-14	G. Halford	37	25	10	2
1878-79	J. F. Brown	15	10	3	2	1896-97	W. H. Taylor	31	18	8	5	1914-15	No fixtures due to WW1				
1879-80	J. F. Brown	16	14	2	0	1897-98	W. H. Taylor	35	24	5	6	1915-16	No fixtures due to WW1				
1880-81	J. F. Brown	13	7	3	3	1898-99	W. H. Taylor	34	27	6	1	1916-17	No fixtures due to WW1				
1881-82	J. F. Brown	19	14	5	0	1899-1900	W. H. Taylor	32	23	7	2	1917-18	No fixtures due to WW1				
1882-83	J. F. Brown	14	11	0	3	1900-01	G. Romans	34	24	5	5	1918-19	No fixtures due to WW1				
1883-84	H. J. Boughton	19	15	2	2	1901-02	G. Romans	34	24	7	3	1919-20	G. Halford	33	19	12	2
1884-85	H. J. Boughton	20	11	7	2	1902-03	G. Romans	35	19	15	1	1920-21	F. Webb	37	25	10	2
1885-86	T. G. Smith	17	13	3	1	1903-04	G. Romans	34	18	14	2	1921-22	S. Smart	41	24	14	3
1886-87	T. G. Smith	19	10	7	2	1904-05	G. Romans & W. Johns	32	23	11	2	1922-23	F. W. Ayliffe	43	27	13	3
1887-88	T. G. Smith	19	10	6	3	1905-06	W. Johns	37	26	8	3	1923-24	T. Millington	49	24	14	1
1888-89	T. G. Smith	22	14	3	5	1906-07	D. R. Gent	34	21	11	2						
1889-90	C. E. Brown	25	14	8	3	1907-08	G. Vears	34	23	9	2						
1890-91	T. Bagwell	26	21	2	3	1908-09	A. Hudson	37	23	10	4						

=== Continued successes and the dawn of professionalism ===
In 1972, Gloucester RFC won the first-ever National Knock-Out Competition. Having beaten Bath, Bristol, London Welsh and Coventry (all away from home) in earlier rounds, they beat Moseley in a Twickenham final that was marred by violence and the sending off of Moseley's Nigel Horton.

In 1978, Gloucester RFC won the first ever John Player Cup, defeating Leicester Tigers in another final noted for violent play both on and off the pitch at Twickenham Stadium.

Despite the two cup wins of the 1970s, and a shared trophy in 1982, Gloucester were soon to find themselves in the shadow of Bath, the rising force from down the A46.

In 1989, Gloucester came close to winning the 'double' but failed to win either competition, losing to Wasps for the league title and losing the cup final 48–6 to Bath.

Professionalism finally came in 1995, but Gloucester was without a major investor, and lost ground in terms of player recruitment and revenue acquisition. But this did not prevent the club from transforming itself into a limited company.

=== The early professional era ===
Tom Walkinshaw bought the club in 1997. After two full seasons at the helm, Richard Hill was replaced as director of rugby by former France captain Philippe Saint-André.

In 1999–2000, a third-place finish took Gloucester into the Heineken Cup. With Phil Vickery, Trevor Woodman, Kingsley Jones and former All Black Ian Jones forming the basis of a formidable pack, Gloucester reached the semi-finals.

In 2003, Gloucester won their first cup in 25 years, under new coach Nigel Melville.

During the 2002–03 season, Gloucester finished the league in first place, 15 points ahead of the next best club. Under the new Premiership playoff system, Gloucester were required to play a single knock-out match to determine the Premiership champions. Despite a significant rest period of three weeks, Gloucester lost the final to Wasps and have thus never been crowned English domestic champions. Melville left the club and was replaced by Dean Ryan for the 2005–06 season.

At the start of the 2005 season, owner Tom Walkinshaw made several changes to modernise the club. 'Gloucester Rugby Football Club' was renamed 'Gloucester Rugby' and, due to copyright issues, no longer used the City Coat of Arms as the club's crest (as the crest didn't belong to the club, so unofficial merchandise was freely available).

The 2005–06 season saw an improvement in the club's fortunes, although they did not qualify for the play-offs, they were strong contenders and lost out on the last day of the regular season. They also won silverware in the European Challenge Cup, defeating London Irish in a final that went into extra time.

Gloucester finished 1st in the 2006–07 Premiership table. Both Leicester and Gloucester tied with 71 points, but Gloucester gained first place with more games won. Gloucester defeated Saracens in the semi-final at Kingsholm, 50–9, and faced Leicester Tigers in the final. Gloucester lost 44–16.

=== 2008–present ===
Martin St Quinton, an office equipment and telecoms entrepreneur acquired 25% of the club in 2008, and became vice chairman, with a focus on increasing sponsorship and other non-playing related areas.

Gloucester Rugby began the 2007–08 Guinness Premiership campaign as favourites, and came top of the league to book a place in the play-off semi-final at Kingsholm. Leicester Tigers won the match 25–26, marking Gloucester's third Premiership play-off defeat.

Gloucester reached the EDF Energy Cup Final in the 2008–09 season, losing to Cardiff at Twickenham.

On 11 June 2009, Dean Ryan left Gloucester by mutual consent and was replaced by Bryan Redpath as their new head coach.

Tragedy struck the club on 12 December 2010, when popular club owner Tom Walkinshaw died from cancer at the age of 64. David McKnight was appointed non-executive chairman in April 2011, who guided Tom's son Ryan, who inherited the club. A memorial service held at Gloucester Cathedral for Tom was attended by hundreds of fans.

Gloucester won the Anglo-Welsh cup in the 2010–11 season, beating Newcastle Falcons 34–7 in the final at Franklins' Gardens. They also made the Premiership play-offs this season, losing in the Semi-final to Saracens at Vicarage Road.

On 17 April 2012, Bryan Redpath announced his resignation as Gloucester head coach with immediate effect, months before the end of the 2011–12 season. In June 2012, Gloucester announced former Scarlets coach Nigel Davies as their new director of rugby.

On 13 November 2012, Gloucester hosted an International match against Fiji as part of the 2012 Autumn Internationals. The match was held at Kingsholm Stadium and Gloucester won 31–29. On 12 November 2013, Gloucester hosted an International match against Japan, as part of the 2013 Autumn Internationals. Gloucester won 40–5.

After two poor seasons towards the end of the 2013–14 season, Nigel Davies departed Gloucester with immediate effect. On 7 June 2014, Gloucester appointed David Humphreys as their new director of rugby, with Brumbies coach Laurie Fisher confirmed as their head coach as of July 2014. During the 2014–15 season, Gloucester won the European Rugby Challenge Cup at Twickenham Stoop, beating Edinburgh 19–13 in the final.

In 2016, Martin St Quinton acquired 100% full ownership of the club to become the new chairman of Gloucester Rugby with immediate effect.

On 6 March 2017, Laurie Fisher left Gloucester by mutual consent before the end of the 2016–17 season. On 3 April 2017, he was replaced by Lions coach Johan Ackermann as Gloucester's new head coach. During the 2016–17 season, Gloucester reach the final of the European Rugby Challenge Cup, losing 17–25 to Stade Francais at Murrayfield. During the 2017–18 season, Gloucester reach the final of the European Rugby Challenge Cup, marking three European finals in four seasons, but lost to Cardiff 31–30 at San Mames Stadium, Bilbao.

On 15 May 2020, Johan Ackermann announced his departure from Gloucester to become the new head coach at NTT DoCoMo Red Hurricanes based in Japan. On 2 June 2020, David Humphreys announced he will leave Gloucester after six seasons as their director of rugby, a month after Ackermann's departure.

On 27 June 2020, Gloucester announced London Irish Forwards Coach George Skivington as their new head coach, with Alex Brown promoted to the position of Chief Operating Officer. This meant Skivington would handle the playing side of his new job whilst Brown focused on rugby related matters like recruitment and regulatory issues at Gloucester.

In July 2023, Brown was appointed interim CEO following the resignation of Lance Bradley. In September 2023, the club announced a number of promotions after a board meeting in August, Brown was appointment CEO following the interim period and Skivington promoted to Director of Rugby meaning he will have responsibility over the entire playing department with no effect to his role as head coach. Gloucester finished the 2024-25 season in 5th, narrowly missing out on the play-offs by 2 points. The fifth-placed finish earned them a place in the European Rugby Champions Cup for the first time since the 2022–23 iteration.

In August 2025, ahead of the 2025–26 season, Wales scrum-half Tomos Williams was given the captaincy, replacing the previous captain Lewis Ludlow, who had held the position for the previous five years.

In March 2026, Skivington returned to his role as Head Coach, having served as Director of Rugby since September 2023. It was also announced that Chris Boyd had been appointed Consultant Technical Director, while Rob Burgess was named General Manager (Rugby).

== Women's team ==
In 2014, Gloucester Rugby and Hartpury College came together to found Gloucester–Hartpury Women's Rugby Football Club. They are run under the jurisdiction of Gloucester Rugby. Gloucester–Hartpury have won the 2016–17 season of the Women's Championship Midlands 2 as well as Premiership Women's Rugby three times, with the latter being the highest level of women's rugby union in England.

== Stadium ==
Gloucester Rugby plays home matches at Kingsholm Stadium. The club left the Spa Ground for Kingsholm when it bought an area of the Castle Grim Estate for £4,000 in 1891. In that year, Gloucester Rugby Football Club opened the "Sixpenny" stand, which later became known as the Shed.

Kingsholm's capacity was further increased to 20,000 in 1926 when a grandstand was added to the stadium at a cost of £2,500, containing 1,750 seats. However, six years later, it was destroyed by fire. There were plans proposed to increase the seating capacity of the stadium to 7,000. However, it remained a proposal, although the grandstand was replaced, terracing in the Sixpenny, and at the Tummp end was preferred, and indeed, more affordable in the early 20th century.

Like the clubs of the Welsh mining valleys, Gloucester Rugby traditionally drew its support and its playing strength from local working-class communities. The Shed, so-called because it looks like a cow shed, became known as such in the 1950s. Gloucester Rugby's fanzine, 'Shed Head' refers to it as 'the cauldron of fear'. The Shed is a standing-only terracing that runs continuously down one touchline, opposite the point where visiting teams emerge from the dressing rooms. Its low tin roof amplifies the effect of passionate support which has been mentioned by commentators sitting above it during live broadcasts. This, together with a historically good home record, contributes to the ground also being nicknamed 'Castle Grim'.

In October 2003, Gloucester Rugby launched 'Project Kingsholm'. 'The Kingsholm Supporters Mutual' (KSM) was set up by Gloucester Rugby Football Club in October 2003, to help fundraise towards 'Project Kingsholm', the redevelopment of Gloucester's entire ground at a cost of £6,000,000, and the launch of a supporters shares rights issue. The idea was to be similar to the development at Franklins Gardens, home of Northampton Saints RFC, although on a bigger scale, incorporating both seating and terracing. Despite the KSM meeting the fundraising targets, Gloucester Rugby abandoned all plans.

In 2006, the club announced it would be making an extension to Kingsholm, bringing the stadium capacity up to 16,500. This was mainly to comply with Premier Rugby's minimum seat number requirements. The old main Grandstand (which was both terracing and seating) was later replaced by a new all seater structure, while terracing on the Worcester Street end of the ground was developed into an all seater stand, known as the 'Buildbase' stand at the time.

In January 2007, the club announced plans to redevelop The Shed terracing to all seater. This was intended to enable the entire stadium to become all-seating. A large number of supporters did not want to see this happen under the proposals put forward by Gloucester Rugby, and a poster campaign under the name of 'Save Our Shed' or 'SOS' was initiated by the Gloucester Citizen newspaper. Posters were held up by supporters standing in the Shed, on camera during a televised Heineken Cup match against Leinster at Kingsholm. T-shirts were also made independently by supporters, with the slogan 'Save Our Shed' printed on them. The campaign did not protest the redevelopment of the Shed, rather the plans put forward at the time, which were to replace all terracing with seats, leaving no alternative anywhere in the ground, despite such a large demand for terracing.

In September 2008, chairman Tom Walkinshaw confirmed there were plans for the Shed to be redeveloped, but it would remain as a terrace (with an increased capacity of 6,000), with hospitality units above it. However, as of the 2010–11 season, the need and desire for redeveloping the Shed decreased with the above-mentioned plans proving to be conjecture, and as such abandoned, have never come into effect and do not appear to for the foreseeable future.

2007 also saw the club reject the proposal of a new 20,000 all seater stadium in an area of the city nicknamed 'The Railway Triangle'. This was intended to be shared with the local football side. Kingsholm was also suggested in October 2007 as a possible temporary home for Gloucester City after their stadium Meadow Park was flooded and then abandoned following the summer floods. This move was, however, rejected by Gloucester Rugby Chairman, Tom Walkinshaw.

In 2017, Gloucester Rugby announced that the Kingsholm Stadium will include a megastore and even museum.

== Colours ==
Gloucester Rugby's traditional colours.

The Gloucester Rugby crest used from 2005 to 2018

The crest used for the clubs 150th anniversary in the 2023–24 season

According to local legend, it was decided that the club's colour was to be entirely navy blue, yet on an away trip they realised they had forgotten to bring sufficient Navy strip for the entire team. Travelling en route via Painswick, they stopped off at the local rugby club and asked to borrow a strip. Painswick RFC loaned them 15 of their cherry-and-white jerseys, the Gloucester side went on to win the away fixture and failed to return the shirts to Painswick, adopting the colours as their own. In 2003, to celebrate Gloucester RFC's 130th anniversary, Gloucester RFC returned the favour and donated Painswick RFC an entire new set of first team colours. Painswick RFC refer to themselves as "The Original Cherry and Whites" in reference to the incident.

For the start of the 2000–01 season, the club introduced new shirts which no longer featured the cherry-and-white hoops, instead featuring a largely red shirt with white sleeves.

The hoops returned in the 2001–02 season, with thin white hoops. In the 2005–06 season, the club moved away from traditional hoops again. The New Jersey was predominantly red, with white panelling on the side in a 'ladder' effect. This was dubbed the 'Spiderman' or 'Arsenal' kit by supporters. The new kit also abandoned the traditional navy blue shorts and socks, with the new design becoming all red. On the release of the 2005–06 shirt there was a degree of disappointment in Gloucester Rugby's decision to move away from the hooped jersey again (a design generally associated with traditional rugby shirts), as this was a dramatic move away from the classic Gloucester Rugby design. After the new 2005–06 shirt was released, 'Hudsons & Co' of Gloucester city centre, released a classic, plain cherry-and-white-hooped Gloucester Rugby jersey, manufactured by Cotton Traders (who supplied Gloucester Rugby jerseys prior to the 2007–08 season, when the manufacture of kit was taken over by RugbyTech), albeit an unofficial jersey which is not associated with the club, the shirt proved popular with fans unhappy with the official shirt. On the back of this success, many of the Public Houses in the Kingsholm area also began selling shirts with the classic hoops. Although these shirts do not display the name 'Gloucester Rugby', due to copyright, the Hudson variety were labelled 'Gloucester Rugby Football Club' while the pub versions used the title 'Cherry and Whites'. Both designs used the traditional cherry-and-white hoops, with the title under the Gloucester city coat of arms. As such many of the fans who disapproved of the new original design were able to purchase this classic design instead.

A number of fans commented on the irony that, whilst the new crest and shirt design were originally designed in order to prevent unofficial merchandise, they have in fact increased the number of fans turning to unofficial shirts. Gloucester Rugby released its own, official, supporters shirt displaying the classic hooped design with the new club crest above the date of the club's inception '1873'. For the start of the 2009–10 season, the club returned the first team jersey design to the cherry-and-white hoops.

In 2018, Gloucester revealed a new logo.

== Kits ==
For many years, Cotton Oxford and Cotton Traders provided the playing kits for Gloucester. Between the 2007–08 and the 2010–11 seasons, RugbyTech supplied their kits, and between the 2011–12 season and the 2015-16 Kooga supplied the kits. Australian kit manufacturer XBlades were the provider, between the 2016–17 and 2018–19 seasons. From the 2019–20 season onwards Oxen Sports supplied the kit.

As of the 2024–25 season, BiGDUG, a Gloucester-based shelving company are the front-of-shirt sponsor. Hartpury appears on each shoulder. Kärcher feature on the lower back of the shirt as well as on the back of the playing shorts. For the European shirt, Malvern Tyres replace BiGDUG as the front-of-shirt sponsor.

In February 2023, Gloucester announced that for the first Slater Cup game held at Kingsholm that they would play in a limited edition Slater Cup shirt. The club also announced that £10 from every shirt sold would go directly to the Slater family to aid Ed's treatment, and adaptations to his home and provide valuable financial support to his family following his diagnosis with Motor Neurone Disease in July 2022.

The shirt was designed by Ed and his family, and contains touches such as '4Dad' above the club logo, while the classic cherries of the 'Cherry & Whites' also appear on the bottom of the shirt. The Slater Cup trophy is on the left sleeve, while a portrait of Ed appears on the right. The classic Gloucester Rugby red remains as the core colour of the new strip, with the number 4, Ed's position, placed on the front. It was used in Slater Cup fixtures for two seasons.

== Nickname ==
Gloucester are referred to by fans and media alike as the Cherry and Whites, a reference to the club's colours. Although this is not an official nickname, the club themselves regularly use the nickname in marketing and community messaging, as well as the players through social media. In the early 2010s, the club released an official fan shirt with imagery of cherries and the city's Cathedral on. The history of this nickname being used can be traced to local media references in the 1920s, when the nickname the "Red and Whites" was used, before evolving into the now familiar "Cherry and Whites" nickname during the 1950s/60s.

In 2005, the club decided to abandon its "Cherry and Whites" nickname and changed themselves to Lions instead but no official change was made during the year.

Another unofficial nickname for the club was "The Elver Eaters', although that name is a distant memory mused over by the club's oldest and longest supporters.

== Season summaries ==
	Premiership				Domestic Cup		European Cup	
Season	Competition	Final Position	Points	Play-Offs	Competition	Performance	Competition	Performance
1987–88	Courage League Division 1	5th	29	N/A	John Player Cup	4th round	No competition	N/A
1988–89	Courage League Division 1	2nd	15	N/A	Pilkington Cup	Semi-final	No competition	N/A
1989–90	Courage League Division 1	2nd	17	N/A	Pilkington Cup	Runners-up	No competition	N/A
1990–91	Courage League Division 1	6th	12	N/A	Pilkington Cup	4th round	No competition	N/A
1991–92	Courage League Division 1	4th	15	N/A	Pilkington Cup	Semi-final	No competition	N/A
1992–93	Courage League Division 1	5th	12	N/A	Pilkington Cup	3rd round	No competition	N/A
1993–94	Courage League Division 1	8th	14	N/A	Pilkington Cup	Quarter-final	No competition	N/A
1994–95	Courage League Division 1	7th	13	N/A	Pilkington Cup	4th round	No competition	N/A
1995–96	Courage League Division 1	8th	12	N/A	Pilkington Cup	Semi-final	No English teams	N/A
1996–97	Courage League Division 1	7th	23	N/A	Pilkington Cup	Semi-final	Challenge Cup	4th in pool
1997–98	Allied Dunbar Premiership	6th	23	N/A	Tetley's Bitter Cup	5th round	Challenge Cup	Quarter-final
1997–98	Allied Dunbar Premiership	6th	23	N/A	C&G Cup	Champions	Challenge Cup	Quarter-final
1998–99	Allied Dunbar Premiership	10th	19	N/A	Tetley's Bitter Cup	Semi-final	No English teams	N/A
1998–99	Allied Dunbar Premiership	10th	19	N/A	C&G Cup	Champions	No English teams	N/A
1999–2000	Allied Dunbar Premiership	3rd	40	N/A	Tetley's Bitter Cup	Quarter-final	Challenge Cup	2nd in pool
2000–01	Zurich Premiership	7th	48	N/A	Tetley's Bitter Cup	5th round	Heineken Cup	Semi-final
2001–02	Zurich Premiership	3rd	68	N/A	Powergen Cup	Quarter-final	Challenge Cup	Semi-final
2002–03	Zurich Premiership	1st	82	Runners-up	Powergen Cup	Champions	Heineken Cup	3rd in pool
2003–04	Zurich Premiership	4th	63	-	Powergen Cup	6th round	Heineken Cup	Quarter-final
2004–05	Zurich Premiership	6th	47	-	Powergen Cup	Semi-final	Heineken Cup	2nd in pool
2005–06	Guinness Premiership	5th	59	-	Powergen Cup	2nd in pool	Challenge Cup	Champions
2006–07	Guinness Premiership	1st	71	Runners-up	EDF Energy Cup	2nd in pool	Heineken Cup	3rd in pool
2007–08	Guinness Premiership	1st	74	Semi-final	EDF Energy Cup	2nd in pool	Heineken Cup	Quarter-final
2008–09	Guinness Premiership	6th	57	-	EDF Energy Cup	Runners-up	Heineken Cup	3rd in pool
2009–10	Guinness Premiership	7th	48	-	LV= Cup	Runners-up	Challenge Cup*	Quarter-final*
2010–11	Aviva Premiership	3rd	67	Semi-final	LV= Cup	Champions	Challenge Cup	2nd in pool
2011–12	Aviva Premiership	9th	44	-	LV= Cup	3rd in pool	Heineken Cup	3rd in pool
2012–13	Aviva Premiership	5th	60	-	LV= Cup	4th in pool	Challenge Cup	Quarter-final
2013–14	Aviva Premiership	9th	44	-	LV= Cup	2nd in pool	Challenge Cup*	Quarter-final*
2014–15	Aviva Premiership	9th	48	-	LV= Cup	2nd in pool	Challenge Cup	Champions
2015–16	Aviva Premiership	8th	49	-	No competition	N/A	Challenge Cup	Quarter-final
2016–17	Aviva Premiership	9th	46	-	Anglo-Welsh Cup	2nd in pool	Challenge Cup	Runners-up
2017–18	Aviva Premiership	7th	56	-	Anglo-Welsh Cup	2nd in pool	Challenge Cup	Runners-up
2018–19	Gallagher Premiership	3rd	68	Semi-final	Premiership Cup	3rd in pool	Champions Cup	4th in pool
2019–20	Gallagher Premiership	7th	46	–	Premiership Cup	4th in pool	Champions Cup	2nd in pool
2020–21	Gallagher Premiership	11th	45	–	No competition	N/A	Champions Cup	Round of 16
2021–22	Gallagher Premiership	5th	73	–	Premiership Cup	Semi-final	Challenge Cup	Quarter-final
2022–23	Gallagher Premiership	10th	41	–	Premiership Cup	2nd in pool	Champions Cup	Round of 16
2023–24	Gallagher Premiership	9th	32	–	Premiership Cup	Champions	Challenge Cup	Runners-up
2024–25	Gallagher Premiership	5th	56	–	Premiership Rugby Cup	Quarter-final	Challenge Cup	Quarter-final
2025–26	Gallagher Premiership	8th	31	–	Premiership Rugby Cup	3rd in pool	Champions Cup	6th in pool

Gold background denotes champions
Silver background denotes runners-up
Pink background denotes relegated

* After dropping into the competition from the Champions Cup/Heineken Cup

== Club honours ==
=== Gloucester Rugby ===
- Premiership Rugby
  - Runners-up: (4) 1988–89, 1989–90, 2002–03, 2006–07
- National Merit Table 'A'
  - Champions: (1) 1985–86
- Zurich Premiership Play-Off
  - Champions: (1) 2001–02
- European Challenge Cup
  - Champions: (2) 2005–06, 2014–15
  - Runners-up: (3) 2016–17, 2017–18, 2023–24
- RFU Knockout Cup
  - Champions: (4) 1971–72, 1977–78, 1981–82, 2002–03
  - Runners-up: (1) 1989–90
- Anglo-Welsh Cup
  - Champions: (1) 2010–11
  - Runners-up: (2) 2008–09, 2009–10
- Premiership Rugby Cup
  - Champions: (1) 2023–24
- C&G Cup
  - Champions: (2) 1997–98, 1998–99

=== Gloucester United ===
- Premiership Rugby Shield
  - Runners-up: (1) 2016–17

=== Sevens ===
- Premiership Rugby Sevens Series
  - Champions: (2) 2013, 2014
  - Runners-up: (1) 2012
- Middlesex Sevens
  - Champions: (1) 2005

== Current squad ==
The Gloucester Rugby squad for the upcoming 2026–27 season is:

Gloucester Rugby 2026–27 Premiership Rugby squad
**Props**: (South Africa) Dian Bleuler; (England) Afolabi Fasogbon; (Samoa) **Marco Fepulea'i**; (England) Jamal Ford-Robinson; (England) Ciaran Knight; (Georgia (country)) Val Rapava-Ruskin; (England) Eliot Salt; **Hookers**: (England) Seb Blake; (England) Jack Innard; (Wales) **Dewi Lake** **(c)**; **Locks**: (England) **Arthur Clark**; (England) Danny Eite; (Ireland) Joe Joyce; (South Africa) **Jean Kleyn**; (Wales) **Freddie Thomas**	**Back row**: (England) Jack Clement; (England) **Lewis Ludlow**; (Scotland) Jack Mann; (Wales) **Jac Morgan** **(vc)**; (England) Harry Taylor; (England) Will Trenholm; (South Africa) James Venter; **Scrum-halves**: (England) Mike Austin; (England) Caolan Englefield; (England) **Dan Robson**; **Fly-halves**: (England) **Charlie Atkinson**; (Ireland) **Ross Byrne**	**Centres**: (England) **Seb Atkinson** **(vc)** (Note: Seb Atkinson is jointly contracted with the RFU, with an enhanced England Elite Player Squad (EPS) contract.); (England) Phil Cokanasiga; (England) **Will Joseph**; (Wales) **Max Llewellyn**; **Wings**: (England) Josiah Edwards-Giraud; (Wales) **Josh Hathaway**; (England) Ben Loader; (England) **Ollie Thorley**; **Fullbacks**: (England) George Barton; (England) Ben Redshaw
**(c)** denotes the team captain. (vc) denotes vice-captain. **Bold** denotes internationally capped players. * denotes players qualified to play for England on residency or dual nationality.^{ST} denotes a short-term signing. Notes Source:

=== Academy squad ===
Gloucester Rugby 2026-27 academy squad
**Props**: (England) George Alexander; (England) Harrison Bellamy; **Hookers**: (England) Keelan Freeman-Price; (England) George Knowles; (England) Teddy Smith-Milne; **Locks**: (England) Freddie Ogden-Metherell; (Wales) Oscar Rees; **Back row**: (England) Olly Allport; (England) Jonno Balding; (England) Oscar Churchouse; (Wales) Jack Gilbert; (Wales) Deian Gwynne; (England) Henry Horsfall; (Wales) Caio James; (England) Jayden Wrottesley	**Scrum-halves**: (New Zealand) Halen King ^{ST} (Note: Short-term deal until the end of November 2026, option to make permanent); (Wales) Lucas Woodyatt; **Fly-halves**: (England) Oli Hewitt; (England) Zac Jones; (New Zealand) Callum McCabe ^{ST} (Note: Short-term deal until the end of November 2026, option to make permanent); **Centres**: (England) Max Knight; (England) Will Knight; **Wings**: (Scotland) Ewan Caven; (England) Jack Cotgreave; (England) Junior Denny; (England) Kai Wilkinson; (England) Krystoff Wood; **Fullbacks**: (England) Tomoas Evans; (England) Will Hodgson
Italics denotes U20 international. Source:

== Club staff ==
From 1 July 2026, for the 2026–27 season, the management and coaching structure will be the following:

Role	Name
Technical Director	Chris Boyd
Rugby General Manager	Rob Burgess
Head Coach	George Skivington
Forwards Coach	Brett Deacon
Scrum Coach	Ryan Bower
Attack Coach	James Lightfoot-Brown
Defence Coach	Joel Tomkins
Breakdown and Transition Coach	Jack Pattinson
Forwards Transition Coach	T. Rhys Thomas
Backs Transition Coach	Tim Taylor
Head of Performance	Cillian Reardon
Head of Medical Services	Rhys Hughes
Head of Player Development	Dominic Waldouck
Head Analyst	Tom Reynolds
Team Manager	Shaun Bullock
Nutritionist	James Hudson
Head of Academy	Wayne Thompson
Pathway Head Coach	Declan Danaher
Academy Manager	Gareth Delve

== Notable former players ==
Below is a non-exhaustive list of former players for the club who have been either club record holders or have been particularly notable during their time at the club.

- (England) Mike Teague, played in 1991 Rugby World Cup Final while at Gloucester
- (England) Phil Vickery, won 2003 Rugby World Cup Final while at Gloucester
- (England) Trevor Woodman, won 2003 Rugby World Cup Final while at Gloucester
- (England) John Gordon A'Bear, British and Irish Lions tourist in 1936, and Gloucester's youngest ever captain
- (France) Ludovic Mercier, club points and goal-kick record holder
- (South Africa) Franco Mostert, won 2019 Rugby World Cup while playing for Gloucester
- (Wales) Tony Lewis, former England cricket captain

=== Lions tourists ===
The following Gloucester players have been selected for the Lions tours while at the club:

- Walter Jesse Jackson (1891)
- Frank Stout (1899 & 1903)
- Tom Voyce (1924)
- John Gordon A'Bear (1936)
- Peter Hordern (1936)
- Don Rutherford (1966)
- Mike Burton (1974)
- Phil Blakeway (1980)
- Steve Boyle (1983)
- Mike Teague (1989 & 1993)
- Phil Vickery (2001)
- Billy Twelvetrees (2013)
- Ross Moriarty (2017)
- Greig Laidlaw (2017)
- Chris Harris (2021)
- Louis Rees-Zammit (2021)
- Tomos Williams (2025)

=== Rugby World Cup ===
The following are players which have represented their countries at the Rugby World Cup whilst playing for Gloucester:

Tournament	Players selected	England players	Other national team players
1991	1	Mike Teague	—N/a
1995	2	Richard West	Scotland – Ian Smith
1999	4	Neil McCarthy, Phil Vickery	Samoa – Junior Paramore, Terry Fanolua
2003	6	Phil Vickery, Trevor Woodman, Andy Gomarsall	Argentina – Rodrigo Roncero; South Africa – Thinus Delport; Samoa – Terry Fanolua
2007	5	—N/a	Wales – Will James, Gareth Cooper; Italy – Marco Bortolami (c); Scotland – Rory Lawson, Chris Paterson
2011	7	Mike Tindall	Scotland – Scott Lawson, Jim Hamilton, Alasdair Strokosch, Rory Lawson; Fiji – Akapusi Qera; Samoa – Eliota Fuimaono-Sapolu
2015	8	Ben Morgan, Jonny May	Wales – Ross Moriarty, James Hook; Scotland – Greig Laidlaw (c); Argentina – Mariano Galarza; Tonga – Sione Kalamafoni, David Halaifonua
2019	6	Willi Heinz, Jonny May	Scotland – Chris Harris; Italy – Jake Polledri, Callum Braley; South Africa – Franco Mostert
2023	8	Jonny May	Italy – Stephen Varney; Wales – Louis Rees-Zammit; Fiji – Albert Tuisue; Scotland – Chris Harris; Argentina – Matías Alemanno, Santiago Carreras, Mayco Vivas

=== Hall of fame ===
In 2023 for the club's 150th anniversary, 15 professional-era players and 13 amateur-era players were inducted into a Hall of Fame.

==== Professional era ====
The following are professional players who have been inducted into the Gloucester Rugby Hall of Fame:

Player	Position	Years at club	Caps
(France) Olivier Azam	Hooker	2000–2003; 2004–2011	240
(England) Nick Wood	Prop	2003–2016	277
(England) Phil Vickery	Prop	1996–2006	155
(England) Alex Brown	Lock	2003–2012	233
(England) Dave Sims	Lock	1988–1999	256
(South Africa) Jake Boer	Flanker	2000–2007; 2009–2010	190
(England) Andy Hazell	Flanker	1997–2013	263
(England) James Forrester	Number eight	2001–2007	136
(England) Andy Gomarsall	Scrum-half	2000–2005	130
(France) Ludovic Mercier	Fly-half	2001–2003; 2005–2007	105
(England) Mike Tindall	Centre	2005–2013	179
(England) Billy Twelvetrees	Centre	2012–2023	273
(England) Charlie Sharples	Wing	2008–2021	273
(England) James Simpson-Daniel	Wing	2000–2013	272
(England) Olly Morgan	Full-back	2005–2012	131

==== Amateur era ====
A panel voted to induct 13 pre-professional era players into the Hall of Fame, only one player from each decade could be selected. The following players were inducted:

- 1873–1883 – Francis Hartley
- 1883–1893 – George Coates
- 1893–1903 – Tommy Bagwell
- 1903–1913 – Arthur Hudson
- 1913–1923 – Sid Smart
- 1923–1933 – Tom Voyce
- 1933–1943 – Alfred Carpenter
- 1943–1953 – George Hastings
- 1953–1963 – Peter Ford
- 1963–1973 – Alan Brinn
- 1973–1983 – Mike Burton
- 1983–1993 – John Watkins
- 1993–1995 – Mike Teague
