= Max Knight =

Max Knight may refer to:

- Max Knight: Ultra Spy, a 2000 American sci-fi action television film
- Max Knight (rugby union), English rugby union player
