= Johnny Howard =

English rugby union player

- Born: 2 October 1980 (age 46) England
- Height: 1.75 m (5 ft 9 in)
- Weight: 82 kg (12 st 13 lb; 181 lb)

Rugby union career
- Position: Scrum-half
Senior career
Years	Team	Apps	(Points)
2003–2007	Northampton		
2008–2009	Bayonne		
2009–2010	Aix-en-Provence		
2010–2013	Béziers		
- Correct as of 11 October 2013

Johnny Howard (born 2 October 1980) is a retired English rugby union player, most often playing as scrum-half.

== Career ==
Howard first played rugby aged seven at Aylesbury Rugby Club. In 1998, he joined Northampton Saints Rugby Academy, and in the next ten years appeared for the club as a scrum-half and occasionally on the wing. In 2008, he moved to France and played for Aviron Bayonnais. In 2009, he moved again to Pays d'Aix RC and, in 2010, to AS Béziers Hérault, for whom he played until his retirement from professional rugby in 2013. He was in the squad that won promotion to Pro D2 in 2010.

== Post-rugby ==
After retiring from professional sport, Howard opened a restaurant (La Charnière) in Béziers with another player, Charly Malié. The restaurant displays items and memorabilia associated with rugby union, including Andrew Mehrtens' boots. He plays amateur rugby union for Valras.
