= Eliota Fuimaono-Sapolu =

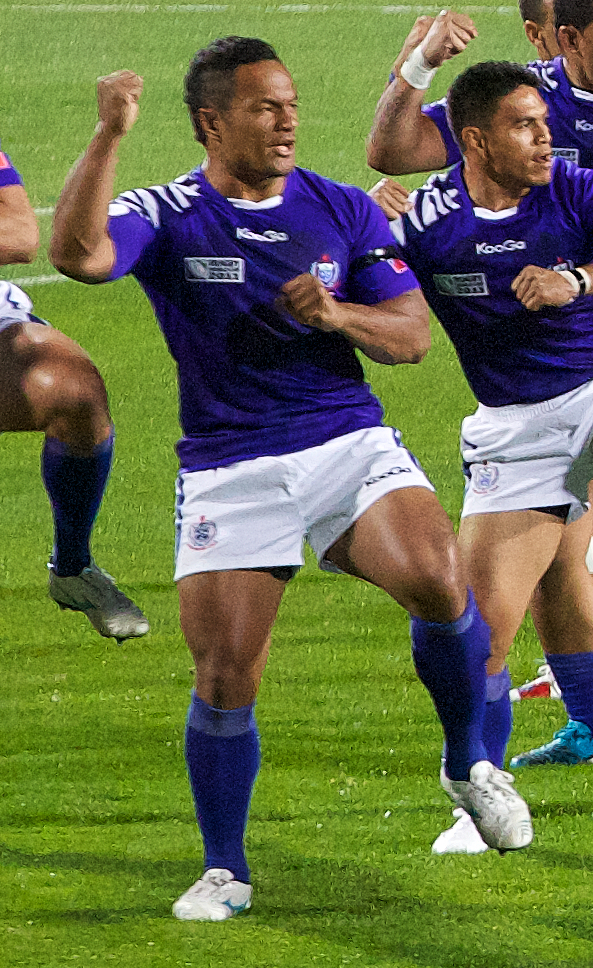
- South Africa vs Samoa at 2011 Rugby World Cup
- Born: 31 October 1980 (age 46) Apia, Samoa
- Height: 1.85 m (6 ft 1 in)
- Weight: 102 kg (225 lb)
- School: Auckland Grammar School

Rugby union career
- Position(s): Centre, Fly half
Senior career
Years	Team	Apps	(Points)
2006–2009	Bath Rugby	43	(15)
2009–2012	Gloucester Rugby	54	(30)
2012–2015	Coca-Cola Red Sparks	13	(35)
International career
Years	Team	Apps	(Points)
2005–2011	Samoa	23	(15)
- Correct as of 21 January 2021

Eliota Fuimaono-Sapolu (born 31 October 1980 in Apia, Samoa) is a Samoan former rugby union footballer. He played at centre. During his career, he received considerable media attention for his constant criticism of the rugby establishment at what he perceived to be racism, post-colonialism, white supremacy and lack of accountability in rugby's governing bodies.

== Early life and education ==
Fuimaono-Sapolu was born in Samoa and migrated to Auckland, New Zealand, with his parents, when he was three years old. He started off at schools in Manurewa dominated by Pacific Island and Maori students. His family was very poor when they first arrived in New Zealand, living in a one-bedroom flat while both parents were studying.

He moved to the prestigious Auckland Grammar School for high school, although not on a scholarship.

He said he enjoyed school until he began asking questions about what he was learning. Fuimaono-Sapolu said although his awareness of racism had been growing during his schooling, it became much clearer at university, where he first learned about the Treaty of Waitangi

== Rugby career ==
Fuimaono-Sapolu first played club rugby as a junior for Manurewa RFC in South Auckland, New Zealand, where he received praise for his commitment, technique, and discipline.

Fuimaono-Sapolu moved to England in January 2006, signed by Bath Rugby after impressive performances in the internationals against Scotland (his international debut for Samoa) and England. He had initially been signed as a temporary replacement to cover for the players playing in the Six Nations Championship, but soon his contract was made permanent. Since arriving at Bath he has won the approval of many fans due to his exciting running and quick hands.

More recently he displayed his all round ability in back play at the 2007 Rugby World Cup, in which he represented Samoa playing out of position at fly-half. Although his side lost to England, South Africa and – surprisingly – Tonga while beating only the USA in the pool stages of the tournament, Fuimaono-Sapolu was one of the standout performers.

In the summer of 2009 Fuimaono-Sapolu left Bath to join Gloucester Rugby on a one-year contract that was later extended for two further seasons. In 2011 Eliota completed an impressive season by sweeping up all the club's major awards at the end of Season prize giving. He won Player of the year, Try of the Year, Player's Player of the year and Season Ticket Holder's Player of the year. In 2011 he was shortlisted by the Rugby Players' Association for their Players' Player of the Year award alongside Chris Ashton, Chris Budgen, Nick Evans, Thomas Waldrom and Tom Wood.

In March 2012, it was announced Sapolu would leave Gloucester to sign with Japanese side Coca-Cola West Red Sparks on a two-year contract. Fuimaono-Sapolu left the side after the 2014–2015 season, and retired from the game. He now works as a lawyer.

== Playing style ==
Primarily a centre, Fuimaono-Sapolu was a powerful physical presence in the midfield. This, combined with a precise passing game and an acute rugby brain, made him a complete back. In 2011, while playing for Gloucester, a video of an outrageous dummy playing against the Newport-Gwent Dragons went viral.

== Personal life and activism ==
Fuimaono-Sapolu is a qualified lawyer. He has been openly critical of the sporting elite, alleging racism in their attitude which "buys into the narrative of the savage Polynesian". Critical of the IRB handling of his comments in 2011 he said they just wouldn't tolerate a Polynesian speaking up.

He's been vocal about racism in the sport of rugby union, and cites his time at Gloucester as an example. In 2011, after having a stellar season playing for the club, he was about to renegotiate the terms of his contract. However, he was told by the management that he couldn't be paid more than a Scottish player.

In 2016, he criticised the appointment of renowned Sevens coach Sir Gordon Tietjens as the new head coach of the Samos Sevens team. He criticized Tietjens for not speaking the Samoan language, and for what he described as a lack of understanding of the country and its culture. He also questioned why rugby's eligibility rules were so tight for players and so loose for coaches.

One of Fuimaono-Sapolu's dearest causes has been to fight racism in sport and education, and to support fellow Polynesians, specially the younger generations. He questioned the over commercialization of the All Blacks brand, stating that the All Blacks' identity "is stolen from Maori culture". Fuimaono-Sapolu has worked extensively to broaden popular knowledge of the contribution of Pacific Island culture and science. He moved to Samoa where he works on raising awareness of domestic abuse and misogyny.

== Social media and controversies ==
Fuimaono-Sapolu's use of social media (specially Twitter) has repeatedly landed him in trouble with rugby's governing bodies.

During the 2011 Rugby World Cup, he made a Twitter post linking the scheduling of the World Cup to slavery, the Holocaust and apartheid, after Samoa had 3 days to prepare for their match against Wales, while Wales had a week to prepare. Officials that met with the Samoa team management accepted an official apology and decided that no further action was necessary. Later in the tournament when Samoa lost to South Africa, Fuimaono-Sapolu tweeted that referee Nigel Owens was "racist" and "biased", which resulted in him being suspended from rugby for six months. However, this punishment was suspended for two years after he retracted his comments, apologies to Owens, and served 100 hours of Rugby community work in Samoa.

In 2011, he was handed a three-week ban by the Rugby Football Union after he criticized its disciplinary process, the Rugby World Cup and the International Rugby Board. He has also criticized other rugby players, officials, and World Rugby via Twitter. He has also been critical of the perceived lack of political engagement from professional rugby players, citing former All Blacks captain Richie McCaw as someone who could have a big influence if he got behind social issues.
