= Terry Fanolua =

Samoan rugby union player

- Born: Terry Laauli Fanolua; 3 July 1974 (age 52) Motoʻotua, Samoa
- Height: 1.83 m (6 ft 0 in)
- Weight: 94 kg (207 lb)
- Notable relative: Junior Paramore (cousin)

Rugby union career
- Position: Centre
Senior career
Years	Team	Apps	(Points)
1997-2006	Gloucester	228	(300)
–	CA Brive		
International career
Years	Team	Apps	(Points)
1996-2005	Samoa	29	(35)

Terry Fanolua (born 3 July 1974) is a Samoan rugby union player. He played as a centre for Gloucester and Samoa for a number of years.

Fanolua played for Gloucester for ten years, playing in over 200 matches.
