= Will James (rugby union, born 1976) =

Wales international rugby union footballer

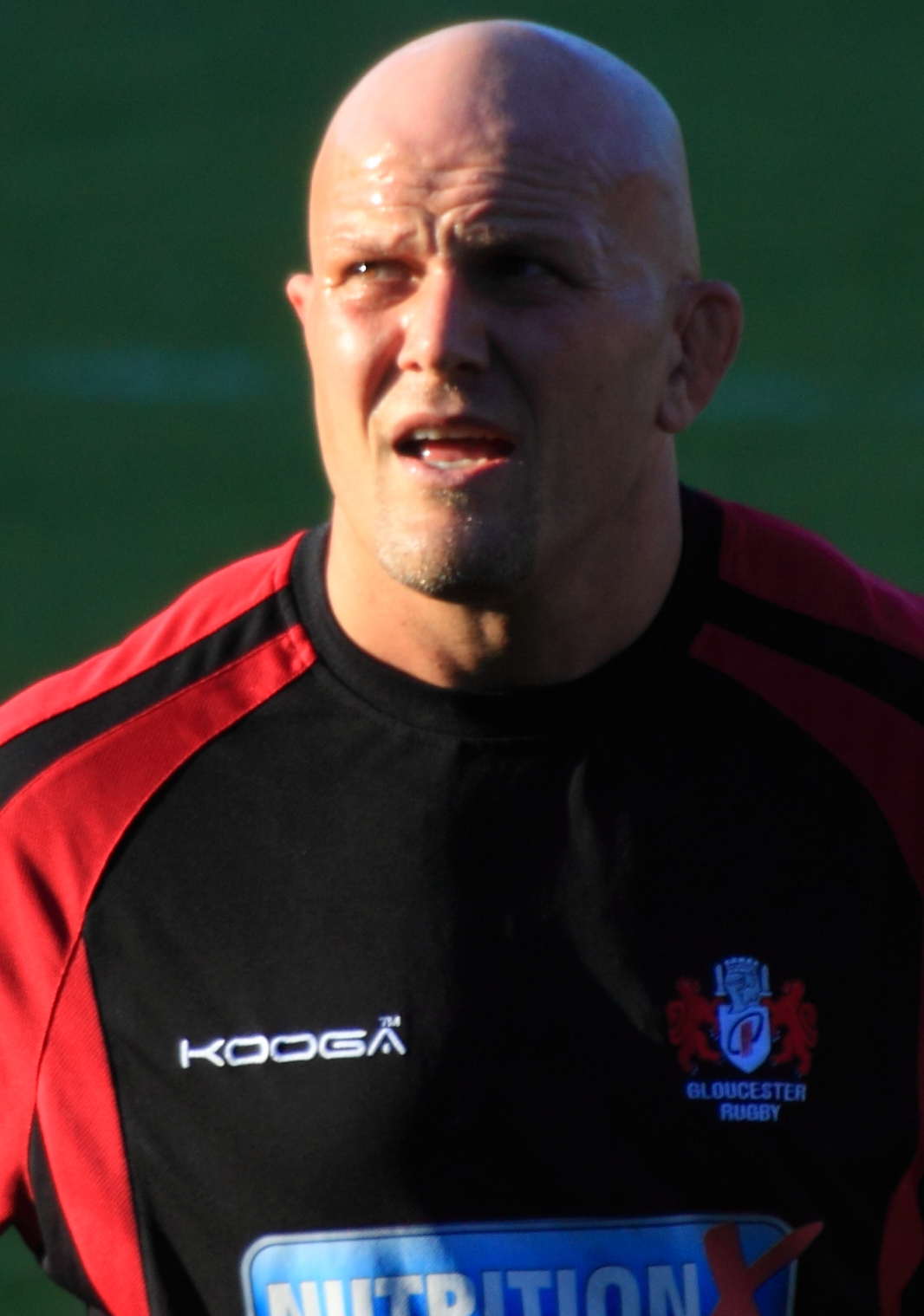
- Born: 22 December 1976 (age 49) Plymouth, England
- Height: 1.98 m (6 ft 6 in)
- Weight: 120 kg (18 st 13 lb; 265 lb)

Rugby union career
- Position: Lock
- Current team: Gloucester Rugby
Senior career
Years	Team	Apps	(Points)
- Pontypool RFC
- Pontypridd RFC
2006-2007	Cornish Pirates	28	(5)
2007-2014	Gloucester Rugby	171	(20)
International career
Years	Team	Apps	(Points)
2007	Wales	4	(0)

Will James (born 22 December 1976 in Plymouth, England) is a former Wales international rugby union player. He most recently played for Gloucester Rugby, and has also played for Pontypool RFC, Pontypridd RFC and Cornish Pirates.

A Wales international James made his international debut for Wales in a friendly match against England at Twickenham in August 2007. He was selected for the Wales squad for the 2007 Rugby World Cup held in France. On 2 April 2013, it was announced that James had signed a one-year contract extension to keep him at Gloucester until the end of the 2013–2014 season.

On 23 January 2014 it was announced that Will James would retire at the end of the season.

Will James is currently the Head of Rugby, Sports Development and Performance at Ampleforth College. A Private school in North Yorkshire.
