= James Simpson-Daniel =

England international rugby union player

- Born: James Simpson-Daniel; 30 May 1982 (age 44) Stockton-on-Tees, England
- Height: 1.83 m (6 ft 0 in)
- Weight: 92 kg (14 st 7 lb)
- School: Sedbergh School

Rugby union career
- Position: Wing / Centre
Senior career
Years	Team	Apps	(Points)
2001-2014	Gloucester Rugby	276	(600)
International career
Years	Team	Apps	(Points)
2002-2008	England Saxons		
2002-2008	England	10	(15)

James David Simpson-Daniel (born 30 May 1982 in Stockton-on-Tees) is a former English rugby union footballer who played wing or centre for Gloucester Rugby.

He attended Red House School & Sedbergh School in the Yorkshire Dales, which has produced a number of professional rugby union players including Will Greenwood, Will Carling and Phil Dowson, with whom he played alongside in the same XV. He began playing for the Yorkshire Under 18s and then the North East Under 18s. His Gloucester Rugby debut was against Rotherham in 2001, when he scored a superb individual try.

He represented England at the Hong Kong Sevens in 2002 and scored a hat trick in the final, which England won. He also scored a hat trick in a club game against Bath. Four days before his twentieth birthday he rounded Jonah Lomu to score a try for England XV against the Barbarians at Twickenham.

He made his international debut for England against New Zealand in November 2002. An injury to his foot meant that he missed a tour to Argentina. He recovered for the Autumn internationals against Australia and New Zealand but was diagnosed with glandular fever and missed out on playing against South Africa. He was playing again within a few months and was able to be a part of Gloucester Rugby winning the Powergen Cup, in the final of which he started and scored two tries.

He narrowly missed selection to the final 30 for the 2003 Rugby World Cup because of a back problem, although he had celebrated his first Six Nations Championship start some months earlier with a try in the match against Italy. Injury once again prevented him playing a part in the 2004 Autumn series in November and he missed further game time for the buildup to the 2005 Six Nations. Picked in the centre for England's final 2005 Autumn test against Samoa but a hip injury forced him off at half-time.

In 2006, he made the squad for England's tour of Australia and scored two tries in their win over the Barbarians on 28 May. However, he suffered a dead leg midweek during training, and as a result missed both tests, in which England lost.

He suffered a comminuted fracture of his collarbone in a pre-season match for Gloucester Rugby.

He was recalled to the England squad for the 2007 Summer Tour of South Africa, alongside club colleagues Andy Hazell, Nick Wood, Iain Balshaw, Anthony Allen and Alex Brown. After Gloucester's 2007–08 season, Simpson-Daniel was named Guinness Premiership Player of The Season beating Olly Barkley and teammate Akapusi Qera.

Simpson-Daniel was called into the England Saxons squad to face Italy A in Ragusa, Sicily on 9 February 2008.

Simpson-Daniel was called into the England squad for the team to face Scotland on 8 March 2008. Called into the 2011 Rugby World Cup training squad, on 1 August 2011 Simpson-Daniel was one of five players released by manager Martin Johnson.

On 2 September 2014, Simpson-Daniel announced his retirement due to an ongoing ankle injury.

Simpson-Daniel is now the marketing director of The Lions Kingdom, an Ostrich meat importer. His brother Charlie is the managing director.

His older brother Chris was also a professional rugby player for Newcastle Falcons and Worcester, however his career was curtailed by injury.
