= Alex Brown (rugby union, born 1979) =

English rugby union player

- Born: Alexander Thomas Brown; 17 May 1979 (age 47) Bristol, England
- Height: 2.01 m (6 ft 7 in)
- Weight: 116 kg (18 st 4 lb)
- School: Colston's Collegiate School

Rugby union career
- Position: Lock
Youth career
- Clifton
Senior career
Years	Team	Apps	(Points)
1998–1999	Bath Rugby		
1999–2000	--->Pontypool		
2000–2003	Bristol Shoguns	86	(20)
2003–2012	Gloucester Rugby	235	(40)
International career
Years	Team	Apps	(Points)
2003	England Saxons		
2006–2007	England	3	(0)
- Correct as of 8 July 2014

Alexander Thomas Brown (born 17 May 1979 in Bristol) is a former English rugby union player, who played at lock position.

He attended Colston's Collegiate School in Bristol.

He started playing rugby at u7s level for Clifton in 1985 and worked his way through the age levels there

After a brief period with Bath and Pontypool, he joined his home city club Bristol and was a key player when they won the first Under 21 Zurich Premiership. Under the tutelage of rugby director Dean Ryan, he was voted the club's player of the year in the 2000–01 season. Brown's father played rugby for Clifton.

Brown signed for Gloucester Rugby in the summer of 2003 rejoining Dean Ryan. The England Saxons international topped the line-out statistics charts during the 2003–04 season and was voted the players' player of the year.

He played for England Saxons in the first Churchill Cup and was called into the England senior squad for the 2005 Autumn Internationals.

Brown was expected to make his international debut against Australia in November, but he suffered a neck injury and was ruled out of the entire Autumn programme.

He made his senior international debut for England during their 2006 summer tour, in a defeat to Australia.

Brown then played in both tests on the 2007 summer tour, England losing both games to South Africa. He picked up the Gillette Power Award for the 2006–07 season. He is widely regarded as one of the most consistent performers in the Premiership and then signed a three-year contract extension with Gloucester until 2011. After proving himself one of the most consistent lock forwards in the premiership, Brown's contract was extended until 2013. Unfortunately, following a shoulder injury sustained during the first match of the 2012–13 season, Brown was forced to announce his retirement on 20 December 2012.

He was appointed Rugby Operations Manager at Kingsholm Stadium with Gloucester Rugby in 2013. He became a director in 2019, In 2020 he was further promoted to Chief Operating Officer; a role which would partly replace director of rugby. He was later appointed CEO on an Interim basis following the resignation of Lance Bradley in July 2023.
