= Mark Woodrow =

English rugby union player

- Born: Mark Woodrow; September 16, 1980 (age 46)
- Height: 1.70 m (5 ft 7 in)
- Weight: 71 kg (11 st 3 lb)

Rugby union career
- Position: Fly Half
- Current team: Dings Crusaders
Youth career
- Dings Crusaders
Senior career
Years	Team	Apps	(Points)
2002	Newbury	5	(2)
2002-03, 2006, 2012-	Dings Crusaders	97	(938)
2003-05, 2008-09, 2010-12	Birmingham & Solihull	99	(934)
2005	Bristol	8	(53)
2005	Partenope		
2006	Nottingham	8	(48)
2006-08	Doncaster	61	(468)
2009-10	Viadana		(127)
2010	Cinderford	8	(76)
2011	Stourbridge	13	(94)
- Correct as of = 25 April 2015
International career
Years	Team	Apps	(Points)
2007, 2009	England Counties XV		

Mark Woodrow (born 16 September 1980) is an English rugby union player-coach for Dings Crusaders currently playing in the English National League 3 South West. His position of choice is fly-half. Mark has played for eleven English national league clubs in addition to appearing for both Paternope (Naples) and later Viadana in the Italian leagues. He is a former England Counties XV international and has previously been involved with England Sevens. Renowned as a prolific and highly accurate points kicker, over his career he has made 300 appearances in English club rugby, scoring 2,613 points as of the end of the 2014-15 season.

== Early career ==
Growing up in Bristol, Mark played youth rugby union for Dings Crusaders from the age of 10. He made his adult debut during the 2002-03 season, playing with Dings in South West Division 1 as well as a spell with Newbury Blues in National Division Two. During his early career Mark also had a brief stint with Exeter as well as a season at Bath U21s. In 2003 Mark was called up the Gloucestershire county side and helped them to reach the County Championship final at Twickenham where they lost a close match 18 - 24 to Lancashire. His impressive performances for Gloucestershire saw him sign a semi-professional contract with Pertemps Bees (now known as Birmingham & Solihull) playing in National Division One under the tutelage of Phil Maynard for the 2003-04 season. His first season at the Bees was a highly successful one as he helped the side to a very respectable 4th place in the league and was influential in the club's shock Powergen Cup defeat of London Wasps at the Causeway Stadium in February 2004, kicking 18 points in a 28 - 24 victory in what was the greatest upset in English club cup history.

Although he started the 2004-05 season for Pertemps Bees, during the latter half of the season Mark moved to Bristol where he signed professional terms. After being a key player at the Bees he was unable to become a first team regular at Bristol in a period where he also played for Italian outfit Napoli and he left to join Nottingham for the 2005-06 season but was no more than a squad player at the Midlands side. Mark made it four clubs in just three seasons for the 2006-07 season when he moved up north to play for Doncaster Knights. It was fourth time lucky as Mark became a regular at Castle Park, helping the Yorkshire side to 3rd place in a competitive division as well as winning the 2007 Yorkshire Cup, scoring over 200 points in league and cup games. His good season was rewarded with a call up to the England Counties XV for their tour of Russia. He stayed a further season with Doncaster for the 2007-08 season as the side finished 4th in the league and he scored 266 points in all competitions. He was also an unused substitute during the 2008 Yorkshire Cup final which saw Doncaster retain the trophy.

== Back and forth with Bees ==
Mark rejoined Birmingham & Solihull (formerly Pertemps Bees), dropping down a division to National Division One (which Bees had just been relegated to) for the 2008-2009 season. Both he and his club had an absolutely fantastic season as Bees made an instant return to the (newly named) Championship by winning the league title and Mark was the top points scorer in the division with 373 points (his best points tally in a season so far). On the back of his season with Birmingham & Solihull, Mark also represented Gloucestershire in the 2009 County Championship, reaching his second county final at Twickenham but once again losing out to Lancashire. During the summer, Mark was called up by the England Counties XV for their tour of Japan and South Korea. Mark's second season with the club was not so successful as the club suffered cash issues and struggled in the 2009–10 RFU Championship. Part way through the season he left to join Italian side Rugby Viadana having had prior experience in the country due to an earlier spell at Napoli. At Viadana he gained Heineken Cup experience in the fixture versus Leicester Tigers and regularly started at fly-half in the Super 10 scoring 127 points and helping his side to the championship final which they lost to Benetton Treviso 12 - 16.

After a year spent in Italy, Mark returned to England to play for Cinderford playing in the 2010–11 National League 1. His spell with the south-west club was a brief one as by October he returned to Birmingham & Solihull for the 2010–11 RFU Championship in what was his third spell with the club. Birmingham & Solihull had endured a tricky past season, narrowly avoiding relegation thanks to coming second in Championship's new format relegation group (they would have been relegated had regular season games counted). Although Mark got games for the club and was a regular points scorer, the Bees were unable to stay up this time and were relegated by the end of the season. Following Birmingham & Solihull's relegation Mark signed for nearby Stourbridge at the start of the 2011-2012 season making 13 league appearances in National League 1 and scoring 94 points. Despite being a regular at Stourbridge, Mark decided to rejoin old club Birmingham & Solihull for the fourth time during the second half of the season. He would finish as third top points scorer in the division from his two club spell but these points were ultimately not enough to help either side as both the Bees and Stourbridge were relegated.

== Return to Dings ==
After the disappointment of relegation with Birmingham & Solihull, Mark returned to his home town Bristol to sign for the club of his youth, Dings Crusaders, where he would play as a player-coach. Mark made an instant impact at Dings, helping them to consecutive mid-table finishes in the 2012-13 and 2013-14 seasons and being the divisions top points scorer in 2013. Despite finishing mid-table the two previous season the 2014-15 season was not a good one for Mark or Dings. Although he once more was one of the division's top scorers, his points could not keep Dings afloat and they were the first side to be relegated, dropping down to National League 3 South West. Despite relegation, Dings did gain some silverware, Mark being part of the Dings side which beat Cleve in the final of the Bristol Combination Cup.

== International career ==
Internationally Woodrow has been capped by the England Counties XV for the 2007 and 2009 tours. In 2008 he was named in the England Sevens training squad although was not selected to play. This is where he gained the nickname 'Splinter' after spending all of his time on the bench.

== Season-by-season playing stats ==
Season	Club	Competition	Appearances	Tries	Drop Goals	Conversions	Penalties	Total Points
2002-03	Newbury Blues	National Division 2	5	0	0	1	0	2
2002-03	Dings Crusaders	South West 1	16	4	5	21	42	203
2003-04	Pertemps Bees	National Division 1	22	0	1	42	17	138
2003-04	Pertemps Bees	Powergen Cup	5	1	0	3	7	32
2004-05	Pertemps Bees	National Division 1	4	0	1	4	3	20
2004-05	Pertemps Bees	Powergen Cup	3	0	0	3	4	18
2004-05	Bristol Shoguns	National Division 1	8	2	0	14	5	53
2004-05	Partenope	Serie A	?	?	?	?	?	?
2005-06	Dings Crusaders	National Division 3 South	1	0	0	1	1	5
2005-06	Nottingham	National Division 1	8	2	0	16	2	48
2005-06	Nottingham	EDF Energy Trophy	0	0	0	0	0	0
2006-07	Doncaster	National Division 1	28	5	2	44	26	197
2006-07	Doncaster	EDF Energy Trophy	2	0	0	1	1	5
2007-08	Doncaster	National Division 1	30	3	1	61	41	263
2007-08	Doncaster	EDF Energy Trophy	1	0	0	0	1	3
2008-09	Birmingham & Solihull	National Division 2	25	8	1	108	38	373
2008-09	Birmingham & Solihull	EDF Energy Trophy	4	0	0	10	1	23
2009-10	Birmingham & Solihull	RFU Championship	2	1	0	4	6	31
2009-10	Viadana	Super 10	?	?	?	?	?	?
2009-10	Viadana	Heineken Cup	1	0	0	0	0	0
2010-11	Cinderford	National League 1	8	0	1	17	13	76
2010-11	Birmingham & Solihull	RFU Championship	18	0	1	27	34	159
2010-11	Birmingham & Solihull	British and Irish Cup	2	0	0	5	3	19
2011-12	Birmingham & Solihull	National League 1	14	1	0	22	24	121
2011-12	Stourbridge	National League 1	13	1	1	16	18	94
2012-13	Dings Crusaders	National League 2 South	25	5	2	48	54	289
2013-14	Dings Crusaders	National League 2 South	29	1	0	51	48	251
2014-15	Dings Crusaders	National League 2 South	26	1	0	37	37	190

== Club Honours ==
Doncaster Knights

- Yorkshire Cup winners (2 times): 2007, 2008

Pertemps Bees/Birmingham & Solihull

- National League Two champions: 2008-09
- National League Two top points scorer (373 points): 2008-09

Viadana

- Super 10 runners up: 2009-10

Dings Crusaders

- National League 2 South top points scorer (289 points): 2012-13
- Bristol Combination Cup winners: 2015

== County / Representative Honours ==
- County Championship runners-up with Gloucestershire (2 times): 2003, 2009
- Represented England Counties XV: 2007, 2009
