= 2007–08 National Division One =

Rugby union competition in England

- Countries: England
- Champions: Northampton Saints
- Runners-up: Exeter Chiefs
- Relegated: Pertemp Bees and Launceston
- Attendance: 544,725 (average 2,279 per match)
- Highest attendance: 13,498 Northampton Saints at home to Exeter Chiefs on 22 March 2008
- Lowest attendance: 350 Pertemps Bees (twice) at home to Plymouth Albion on 15 September 2007 & Esher on 10 November 2007
- Top point scorer: (Ireland) Gareth Steenson (Cornish Pirates) 287 points
- Top try scorer: (England) Chris Ashton (Northampton Saints) 39 tries

The 2007–08 National Division One was the 21st full season of rugby union within the second tier of the English league system, currently known as the RFU Championship. New teams included Northampton Saints (relegated from the Guinness Premiership 2006–07) and Esher and Launceston (both promoted from National Division Two 2006–07). After two seasons Rotherham dropped the 'Earth' from their name to return to 'Rotherham Titans' (which they had been rebranded to in 2005 for the 2005–06 season) as sponsor Earth Mortgages ran into financial difficulties and Complete Technical Services instead became the club's new sponsor.

Following their relegation from the previous season, Northampton Saints won the National Division One title at the first attempt and returned to the Guinness Premiership for season 2008–09 with Chris Ashton setting what was then the English league try record of 39 tries in a season (although Phil Chesters broke this record with 70 tries in a season in tier 4, Ashton's still stands as the highest ever in tier 2). Exeter Chiefs finished in second place, and Pertemp Bees and Launceston were relegated to the 2008–09 National Division Two.

== Participating teams ==
Locations of the 2008–09 National Division One teams

Team	Stadium	Capacity	City/area
Bedford Blues	Goldington Road	5,307 (Note: Goldington Road capacity up to 5,307 for the 2007–08 season with a capacity crowd achieved versus Northampton Saints on 22 September 2007.)	Bedford, Bedfordshire
Cornish Pirates	Recreation Ground	9,000	Camborne, Cornwall
Coventry	Butts Park Arena	4,000	Coventry, West Midlands
Doncaster Knights	Castle Park	3,075	Doncaster, South Yorkshire
Esher	Molesey Road	3,000	Hersham, Surrey
Exeter Chiefs	Sandy Park	6,000	Exeter, Devon
Launceston	Polson Bridge (Note: Launceston would play a 'home game' on 4 March 2008 at Franklin's Gardens in Northampton against Northampton Saints due to there not being suitable floodlights at Polson Bridge.)	3,000	Launceston, Cornwall
London Welsh	Old Deer Park	4,500 (1,500 seats)	Richmond, London
Moseley	Billesley Common	3,000+	Birmingham, West Midlands
Newbury	Monk's Lane	8,000	Newbury, Berkshire
Northampton Saints	Franklin's Gardens	13,600	Northampton, Northamptonshire
Nottingham	Meadow Lane	19,588	Nottingham, Nottinghamshire
Pertemps Bees	Sharmans Cross	3,500 (1,000 seats)	Solihull, West Midlands
Plymouth Albion	The Brickfields	6,500	Plymouth, Devon
Rotherham Titans	Clifton Lane	2,500	Rotherham, South Yorkshire
Sedgley Park	Park Lane	3,000	Whitefield, Greater Manchester

== Table ==
2007–2008 National Division One table
Pos	Team	Pld	W	D	L	PF	PA	PD	B	Pts	Qualification
1	Northampton Saints (C)	30	30	0	0	1321	343	+978	23	143	Promoted
2	Exeter Chiefs	30	24	0	6	899	424	+475	20	116	
3	Nottingham	30	23	0	7	818	518	+300	24	116	
4	Doncaster	30	21	0	9	796	551	+245	14	98	
5	Cornish Pirates	30	20	1	9	800	583	+217	12	91 (Note: 3 points deducted)	
6	Bedford Blues	30	18	0	12	705	542	+163	13	85	
7	London Welsh	30	15	0	15	542	659	−117	10	70	
8	Plymouth Albion	30	12	1	17	530	528	+2	14	64	
9	Coventry	30	11	1	18	637	731	−94	17	63	
10	Moseley	30	12	1	17	519	744	−225	8	58	
11	Rotherham Titans	30	11	0	19	591	856	−265	14	58	
12	Esher	30	10	0	20	481	850	−369	9	49	
13	Newbury	30	8	1	21	497	794	−297	11	45	
14	Sedgley Park	30	7	1	22	506	832	−326	14	44	
15	Pertemps Bees	30	7	0	23	474	696	−222	13	41	Relegated
16	Launceston	30	8	0	22	441	906	−465	8	40	Relegated

Rules for classification: Points are awarded as follows: four points for a win; two points for a draw; no points for a loss; one bonus point for scoring four tries or more in a match; one bonus point for losing by seven points or less.
- If teams are level at any stage, tiebreakers are applied in the following order: (1) difference between points for and against; (2) total number of points for.
  (C) Champion
  Notes:

== Results ==
=== Round 1 ===
1 September 2007

Coventry	13 - 40	Doncaster Knights
	Report

Butts Park Arena
Attendance: 1,195
Referee: Rowan Kitt

1 September 2007

Esher	16 - 25	Plymouth Albion
	Report

Molesey Road
Attendance: 1,290
Referee: Richard Draper

1 September 2007

Exeter Chiefs	48 - 11	Sedgley Park
	Report

Sandy Park
Attendance: 2,919
Referee: Greg Garner

1 September 2007

Launceston	12 - 26	Cornish Pirates
	Report

Polson Bridge
Attendance: 2,995
Referee: Llyr Apgeraint-Roberts

1 September 2007

Newbury	22 - 37	Bedford Blues
	Report

Monk's Lane
Attendance: 752
Referee: Nick Williams

1 September 2007

Northampton Saints	41 - 11	London Welsh
	Report

Franklin's Gardens
Attendance: 11,507
Referee: Mark Wilson

1 September 2007

Pertemps Bees	17 - 31	Rotherham Titans
	Report

Sharmans Cross
Attendance: 780
Referee: Adrian Hartwell

2 September 2007

Nottingham	21 - 28	Moseley
	Report

Meadow Lane
Attendance: 1,103
Referee: Dale Newitt

=== Round 2 ===
8 September 2007

Bedford Blues	31 - 29	Esher
	Report

Goldington Road
Attendance: 1,590
Referee: Greg Garner

8 September 2007

Doncaster Knights	26 - 8	Launceston
	Report

Castle Park
Attendance: 972
Referee: Chris Sharp

8 September 2007

Moseley	23 - 11	Pertemps Bees
	Report

Billesley
Attendance: 1,077
Referee: Tim Wigglesworth

8 September 2007

Plymouth Albion	19 - 28	Exeter Chiefs
	Report

Brickfields
Attendance: 3,751
Referee: Mark Wilson

8 September 2007

Sedgley Park	28 - 21	Coventry
	Report

Park Lane
Attendance: 637
Referee: Nick Williams

9 September 2007

Cornish Pirates	26 - 35	Northampton Saints
	Report

Recreation Ground
Attendance: 6,487
Referee: Dale Newitt

9 September 2007

London Welsh	25 - 23	Newbury
	Report

Old Deer Park
Attendance: 470
Referee: Rowan Kitt

9 September 2007

Rotherham Titans	7 - 19	Nottingham
	Report

Clifton Lane
Attendance: 1,672
Referee: Dean Richards

=== Round 3 ===
15 September 2007

Coventry	16 - 17	Cornish Pirates
	Report

Butts Park Arena
Attendance: 873
Referee: Mark Wilson

15 September 2007

Exeter Chiefs	62 - 10	Rotherham Titans
	Report

Sandy Park
Attendance: 2,820
Referee: Llyr Apgeraint-Roberts

15 September 2007

Launceston	34 - 31	Sedgley Park
	Report

Polson Bridge
Attendance: 1,015
Referee: JP Doyle

15 September 2007

Newbury	22 - 49	Doncaster Knights
	Report

Monk's Lane
Attendance: 402
Referee: Dean Richards

15 September 2007

Northampton Saints	68 - 12	Moseley
	Report

Franklin's Gardens
Attendance: 10,071
Referee: Rowan Kitt

15 September 2007

Pertemps Bees	11 - 35	Plymouth Albion
	Report

Sharmans Cross
Attendance: 350
Referee: Andrew Vertigan

16 September 2007

Esher	28 - 16	London Welsh
	Report

Molesey Road
Attendance: 950
Referee: Nick Williams

16 September 2007

Nottingham	31 - 16	Bedford Blues
	Report

Meadow Lane
Attendance: 932
Referee: Bruce Robertson

=== Round 4 ===
22 September 2007

Bedford Blues	23 - 34	Northampton Saints
	Report

Goldington Road
Attendance: 5,307
Referee: Andrew Small

22 September 2007

Doncaster Knights	26 - 17	Esher
	Report

Castle Park
Attendance: 778
Referee: Adrian Hartwell

22 September 2007

London Welsh	33 - 29	Coventry
	Report

Old Deer Park
Attendance: 510
Referee: JP Doyle

22 September 2007

Moseley	3 - 36	Exeter Chiefs
	Report

Billesley
Attendance: 699
Referee: Richard Draper

22 September 2007

Plymouth Albion	19 - 18	Nottingham
	Report

Brickfields
Attendance: 2,408
Referee: Dale Newitt

22 September 2007

Rotherham Titans	50 - 15	Launceston
	Report

Clifton Lane
Attendance: 1,171
Referee: Greg Garner

22 September 2007

Sedgley Park	13 - 14	Newbury
	Report

Park Lane
Attendance: 536
Referee: Tim Wigglesworth

23 September 2007

Cornish Pirates	43 - 20	Pertemps Bees
	Report

Recreation Ground
Attendance: 2,356
Referee: Chris Sharp

=== Round 5 ===
29 September 2007

Coventry	29 - 10	Rotherham Titans
	Report

Butts Park Arena
Attendance: 1,035
Referee: Bruce Robertson

29 September 2007

Esher	23 - 30	Sedgley Park
	Report

Molesey Road
Attendance: 450
Referee: Dean Richards

29 September 2007

Exeter Chiefs	27 - 6	Bedford Blues
	Report

Sandy Park
Attendance: 3,275
Referee: Dale Newitt

29 September 2007

Launceston	10 - 25	Moseley
	Report

Polson Bridge
Attendance: 873
Referee: Adrian Hartwell

29 September 2007

Newbury	24 - 48	Cornish Pirates
	Report

Monk's Lane
Attendance: 825
Referee: Nick Williams

29 September 2007

Northampton Saints	34 - 15	Plymouth Albion
	Report

Franklin's Gardens
Attendance: 10,099
Referee: Llyr Apgeraint-Roberts

29 September 2007

Pertemps Bees	20 - 24	London Welsh
	Report

Sharmans Cross
Attendance: 500
Referee: Mark Wilson

30 September 2007

Nottingham	34 - 40	Doncaster Knights
	Report

Meadow Lane
Attendance: 961
Referee: Rowan Kitt

=== Round 6 ===
5 October 2007

Bedford Blues	24 - 16	Coventry
	Report

Goldington Road
Attendance: 2,230
Referee: Ashley Rowden

5 October 2007

Doncaster Knights	27 - 15	Pertemps Bees
	Report

Castle Park
Attendance: 750
Referee: Neil Paterson

6 October 2007

London Welsh	20 - 30	Nottingham
	Report

Old Deer Park
Attendance: 420
Referee: Greg Garner

6 October 2007

Moseley	21 - 27	Newbury
	Report

Billesley
Attendance: 675
Referee: Tim Wigglesworth

6 October 2007

Plymouth Albion	50 - 7	Launceston
	Report

Brickfields
Attendance: 2,908
Referee: Nick Williams

6 October 2007

Rotherham Titans	29 - 24	Esher
	Report

Clifton Lane
Attendance: 1,062
Referee: Andrew Vertigan

6 October 2007

Sedgley Park	8 - 59	Northampton Saints
	Report

Park Lane
Attendance: 1,325
Referee: Rowan Kitt

7 October 2007

Cornish Pirates	30 - 23	Exeter Chiefs
	Report

Recreation Ground
Attendance: 4,867
Referee: Mark Wilson

=== Round 7 ===
13 October 2007

Bedford Blues	13 - 10	Plymouth Albion
	Report

Goldington Road
Attendance: 1,793
Referee: Mark Wilson

13 October 2007

Coventry	43 - 16	Moseley
	Report

Butts Park Arena
Attendance: 1,272
Referee: Dale Newitt

13 October 2007

Esher	14 - 24	Cornish Pirates
	Report

Molesey Road
Attendance: 680
Referee: Andy Mcpherson

13 October 2007

Exeter Chiefs	53 - 5	London Welsh
	Report

Sandy Park
Attendance: 3,432
Referee: Bruce Robertson

13 October 2007

Newbury	24 - 35	Rotherham Titans
	Report

Monk's Lane
Attendance: 475
Referee: Richard Draper

13 October 2007

Northampton Saints	39 - 17	Doncaster Knights
	Report

Franklin's Gardens
Attendance: 11,105
Referee: David Pearson

13 October 2007

Pertemps Bees	32 - 8	Launceston
	Report

Sharmans Cross
Attendance: 450
Referee: Llyr Apgeraint-Roberts

14 October 2007

Nottingham	27 - 17	Sedgley Park
	Report

Meadow Lane
Attendance: 1,260
Referee: JP Doyle

=== Round 8 ===
19 October 2007

Nottingham	22 - 10	Pertemps Bees
	Report

Meadow Lane
Attendance: 1,046
Referee: Adrian Hartwell

20 October 2007

Exeter Chiefs	11 - 6	Newbury
	Report

Sandy Park
Attendance: 2,831
Referee: JP Doyle

20 October 2007

Launceston	32 - 29	London Welsh
	Report

Polson Bridge
Attendance: 790
Referee: David Rose

20 October 2007

Moseley	15 - 31	Rotherham Titans
	Report

Billesley
Attendance: 946
Referee: Neil Paterson

20 October 2007

Northampton Saints	74 - 10	Esher
	Report

Franklin's Gardens
Attendance: 10,422
Referee: Nick Williams

20 October 2007

Plymouth Albion	19 - 28	Coventry
	Report

Brickfields
Attendance: 2,943
Referee: Greg Garner

20 October 2007

Sedgley Park	17 - 38	Doncaster Knights
	Report

Park Lane
Attendance: Tim Wigglesworth
Referee: 695

21 October 2007

Cornish Pirates	19 - 18	Bedford Blues
	Report

Recreation Ground
Attendance: 3,047
Referee: Rowan Kitt

=== Round 9 ===
26 October 2007

Doncaster Knights	19 - 13	Plymouth Albion
	Report

Castle Park
Attendance: 2,381
Referee: Dale Newitt

27 October 2007

Bedford Blues	24 - 20	Sedgley Park
	Report

Goldington Road
Attendance: 2,062
Referee: Richard Draper

27 October 2007

Coventry	35 - 27	Launceston
	Report

Butts Park Arena
Attendance: 1,307
Referee: Chris Sharp

27 October 2007

London Welsh	10 - 40	Moseley
	Report

Old Deer Park
Attendance: 790
Referee: Rowan Kitt

27 October 2007

Newbury	5 - 11	Esher
	Report

Monk's Lane
Attendance: 625
Referee: Chris White

27 October 2007

Pertemps Bees	19 - 23	Exeter Chiefs
	Report

Sharmans Cross
Attendance: 430

27 October 2007

Rotherham Titans	0 - 41	Northampton Saints
	Report

Clifton Lane
Attendance: 2,807
Referee: Mark Wilson

28 October 2007

Cornish Pirates	21 - 22	Nottingham
	Report

Recreation Ground
Attendance: 2,655
Referee: Tony Spreadbury

=== Round 10 ===
3 November 2007

Esher	15 - 12	Coventry
	Report

Molesey Road
Attendance: 816
Referee: Rowan Kitt

3 November 2007

Launceston	18 - 25	Exeter Chiefs
	Report

Polson Bridge
Attendance: 1,781
Referee: Ashley Rowden

3 November 2007

London Welsh	10 - 23	Bedford Blues
	Report

Old Deer Park
Attendance: 1,040
Referee: Llyr Apgeraint-Roberts

3 November 2007

Moseley	11 - 18	Doncaster Knights
	Report

Billesley
Attendance: 870
Referee: JP Doyle

3 November 2007

Northampton Saints	60 - 19	Pertemps Bees
	Report

Franklin's Gardens
Attendance: 10,457
Referee: Greg Garner

3 November 2007

Plymouth Albion	15 - 0	Rotherham Titans
	Report

Brickfields
Attendance: 2,695
Referee: Nick Williams

3 November 2007

Sedgley Park	13 - 20	Cornish Pirates
	Report

Park Lane
Attendance: 657
Referee: Bruce Robertson

4 November 2007

Nottingham	31 - 19	Newbury
	Report

Meadow Lane
Attendance: 1,238
Referee: Martin Fox

=== Round 11 ===
10 November 2007

Bedford Blues	62 - 17	Moseley
	Report

Goldington Road
Attendance: 2,217
Referee: Greg Garner

10 November 2007

Coventry	15 - 22	Newbury
	Report

Butts Park Arena
Attendance: 1,501
Referee: Llyr Apgeraint-Roberts

10 November 2007

Doncaster Knights	12 - 16	Cornish Pirates
	Report

Castle Park
Attendance: 1,298
Referee: Nick Williams

10 November 2007

Exeter Chiefs	11 - 25	Northampton Saints
	Report

Sandy Park
Attendance: 5,756
Referee: Sean Davey

10 November 2007

Launceston	23 - 31	Nottingham
	Report

Polson Bridge
Attendance: 938
Referee: Ashley Rowden

10 November 2007

Pertemps Bees	23 - 29	Esher
	Report

Sharmans Cross
Attendance: 350
Referee: David Rose

10 November 2007

Rotherham Titans	3 - 17	London Welsh
	Report

Clifton Lane
Attendance: 800
Referee: Dale Newitt

10 November 2007

Sedgley Park	14 - 20	Plymouth Albion
	Report

Park Lane
Attendance: 516
Referee: Rowan Kitt

=== Round 12 ===
17 November 2007

Bedford Blues	14 - 16	Doncaster Knights
	Report

Goldington Road
Attendance: 2,549
Referee: Llyr Apgeraint-Roberts

17 November 2007

Esher	13 - 47	Exeter Chiefs
	Report

Molesey Road
Attendance: 680
Referee: Adrian Hartwell

17 November 2007

London Welsh	23 - 21	Sedgley Park
	Report

Old Deer Park
Attendance: 810
Referee: Andrew Vertigan

17 November 2007

Moseley	10 - 29	Plymouth Albion
	Report

Billesley
Attendance: 770
Referee: Roy Maybank

17 November 2007

Newbury	24 - 23	Launceston
	Report

Monk's Lane
Attendance: 752
Referee: Bruce Robertson

17 November 2007

Pertemps Bees	21 - 20	Coventry
	Report

Sharmans Cross
Attendance: 650
Referee: Richard Draper

18 November 2007

Cornish Pirates	28 - 18	Rotherham Titans
	Report

Recreation Ground
Attendance: 2,815
Referee: JP Doyle

18 November 2007

Nottingham	10 - 16	Northampton Saints
	Report

Meadow Lane
Attendance: 4,751
Referee: Tim Wigglesworth

=== Round 13 ===
24 November 2007

Doncaster Knights	22 - 3	London Welsh
	Report

Castle Park
Attendance: 968

24 November 2007

Exeter Chiefs	20 - 15	Nottingham
	Report

Sandy Park
Attendance: 3,875
Referee: Nick Williams

24 November 2007

Launceston	0 - 20	Esher
	Report

Polson Bridge
Attendance: 855
Referee: Dale Newitt

24 November 2007

Moseley	13 - 13	Sedgley Park
	Report

Billesley
Attendance: 714
Referee: Bruce Robertson

24 November 2007

Newbury	20 - 6	Pertemps Bees
	Report

Monk's Lane
Attendance: 520
Referee: Greg Garner

24 November 2007

Northampton Saints	65 - 3	Coventry
	Report

Franklin's Gardens
Attendance: 11,810
Referee: Llyr Apgeraint-Roberts

24 November 2007

Plymouth Albion	9 - 6	Cornish Pirates
	Report

Brickfields
Attendance: 6,381
Referee: Mark Wilson

24 November 2007

Rotherham Titans	28 - 25	Bedford Blues
	Report

Clifton Lane
Attendance: 800
Referee: Ashley Rowden

=== Round 14 ===
1 December 2007

Bedford Blues	43 - 16	Launceston
	Report

Goldington Road
Attendance: 1,921
Referee: Martin Fox

1 December 2007

Coventry	19 - 31	Exeter Chiefs
	Report

Butts Park Arena
Attendance: 1,239
Referee: Andrew Small

1 December 2007

Doncaster Knights	39 - 15	Rotherham Titans
	Report

Castle Park
Attendance: 2,243
Referee: Mark Wilson

1 December 2007

Northampton Saints	24 - 23	Newbury
	Report

Franklin's Gardens
Attendance: 10,414
Referee: Rowan Kitt

1 December 2007

Plymouth Albion	29 - 14	London Welsh
	Report

Brickfields
Attendance: 2,132
Referee: Andrew Vertigan

1 December 2007

Sedgley Park	15 - 14	Pertemps Bees
	Report

Park Lane
Attendance: 614
Referee: Nick Williams

2 December 2007

Cornish Pirates	15 - 7	Moseley
	Report

Recreation Ground
Attendance: 2,275
Referee: David Rose

2 December 2007

Nottingham	48 - 15	Esher
	Report

Meadow Lane
Attendance: 1,071
Referee: Steve Edwards

=== Round 15 ===
8 December 2007

Esher	6 - 12	Moseley
	Report

Molesey Road
Attendance: 521
Referee: Dale Newitt

8 December 2007

Exeter Chiefs	26 - 8	Doncaster Knights
	Report

Sandy Park
Attendance: 4,001
Referee: Martin Fox

8 December 2007

Launceston	P - P	Northampton Saints

- Postponed. Game rescheduled to 4 March 2008.

8 December 2007

London Welsh	17 - 20	Cornish Pirates
	Report

Old Deer Park
Attendance: 1,294
Referee: Richard Draper

8 December 2007

Newbury	15 - 13	Plymouth Albion
	Report

Monk's Lane
Attendance: 610
Referee: Chris Sharp

8 December 2007

Pertemps Bees	10 - 13	Bedford Blues
	Report

Sharmans Cross
Attendance: 450
Referee: Llyr Apgeraint-Roberts

8 December 2007

Rotherham Titans	15 - 24	Sedgley Park
	Report

Clifton Lane
Attendance: 802
Referee: Greg Garner

9 December 2007

Nottingham	34 - 6	Coventry
	Report

Meadow Lane
Attendance: 1,133
Referee: Sean Davey

=== Round 16 ===
15 December 2007

Bedford Blues	24 - 7	Newbury
	Report

Goldington Road
Attendance: 1,990
Referee: Tony Spreadbury

15 December 2007

Doncaster Knights	17 - 25	Coventry
	Report

Castle Park
Attendance: 500
Referee: Adrian Hartwell

15 December 2007

London Welsh	10 - 22	Northampton Saints
	Report

Old Deer Park
Attendance: 2,400
Referee: JP Doyle

15 December 2007

Moseley	27 - 36	Nottingham
	Report

Billesley
Attendance: 912
Referee: Roy Maybank

15 December 2007

Plymouth Albion	12 - 17	Esher
	Report

Brickfields
Attendance: 2,429
Referee: Nick Williams

15 December 2007

Rotherham Titans	P - P	Pertemps Bees

- Postponed. Game rescheduled to 15 March 2008.

15 December 2007

Sedgley Park	24 - 40	Exeter Chiefs
	Report

Park Lane
Attendance: 528
Referee: David Bodily

16 December 2007

Cornish Pirates	43 - 12	Launceston
	Report

Recreation Ground
Attendance: 4,937
Referee: Rowan Kitt

=== Round 17 ===
22 December 2007

Coventry	28 - 7	Sedgley Park
	Report

Butts Park Arena
Attendance: 1,408
Referee: Rowan Kitt

22 December 2007

Esher	35 - 30	Bedford Blues
	Report

Molesey Road
Attendance: 1,552
Referee: Sean Davey

22 December 2007

Exeter Chiefs	11 - 10	Plymouth Albion
	Report

Sandy Park
Attendance: 5,815
Referee: David Rose

22 December 2007

Launceston	8 - 27	Doncaster Knights
	Report

Polson Bridge
Attendance: 769
Referee: Bruce Robertson

22 December 2007

Northampton Saints	26 - 10	Cornish Pirates
	Report

Franklin's Gardens
Attendance: 12,868
Referee: Mark Wilson

22 December 2007

Newbury	P - P	London Welsh

- Postponed. Game rescheduled to 23 February 2008.

22 December 2007

Pertemps Bees	7 - 21	Moseley
	Report

Sharmans Cross
Attendance: 1,200
Referee: David Rose

23 December 2007

Nottingham	51 - 7	Rotherham Titans
	Report

Meadow Lane
Attendance: 1,460
Referee: Llyr Apgeraint-Roberts

=== Round 18 ===
29 December 2007

Bedford Blues	26 - 27	Nottingham
	Report

Goldington Road
Attendance: 2,768
Referee: JP Doyle

29 December 2007

Doncaster Knights	37 - 7	Newbury
	Report

Castle Park
Attendance: 956
Referee: Martin Fox

29 December 2007

London Welsh	13 - 10	Esher
	Report

Old Deer Park
Attendance: 1,749
Referee: Greg Garner

29 December 2007

Moseley	18 - 27	Northampton Saints
	Report

Billesley
Attendance: 1,000
Referee: Dale Newitt

29 December 2007

Plymouth Albion	9 - 3	Pertemps Bees
	Report

Brickfields
Attendance: 3,280
Referee: Bruce Robertson

29 December 2007

Rotherham Titans	18 - 24	Exeter Chiefs
	Report

Clifton Lane
Attendance: 1,194
Referee: Mark Wilson

29 December 2007

Sedgley Park	6 - 3	Launceston
	Report

Park Lane
Attendance: 467
Referee: Tim Wigglesworth

30 December 2007

Cornish Pirates	36 - 21	Coventry
	Report

Recreation Ground
Attendance: 3,314
Referee: Nick Williams

=== Round 19 ===
5 January 2008

Coventry	22 - 26	London Welsh
	Report

Butts Park Arena
Attendance: 1,335
Referee: Bruce Robertson

5 January 2008

Esher	18 - 27	Doncaster Knights
	Report

Molesey Road
Attendance: 910
Referee: Roy Maybank

5 January 2008

Exeter Chiefs	35 - 14	Moseley
	Report

Sandy Park
Attendance: 3,848
Referee: Rowan Kitt

5 January 2008

Launceston	10 - 7	Rotherham Titans
	Report

Polson Bridge
Attendance: 790
Referee: Dean Richards

5 January 2008

Newbury	20 - 18	Sedgley Park
	Report

Monk's Lane
Attendance: 620
Referee: Nick Williams

5 January 2008

Northampton Saints	35 - 9	Bedford Blues
	Report

Franklin's Gardens
Attendance: 13,464
Referee: Greg Garner

5 January 2008

Pertemps Bees	23 - 27	Cornish Pirates
	Report

Sharmans Cross
Attendance: 670
Referee: Andrew Vertigan

6 January 2008

Nottingham	31 - 9	Plymouth Albion
	Report

Brickfields
Attendance: 1,187
Referee: Meadow Lane

=== Round 20 ===
19 January 2008

Bedford Blues	14 - 12	Exeter Chiefs
	Report

Goldington Road
Attendance: 2,255
Referee: Mark Wilson

19 January 2008

Doncaster Knights	22 - 10	Nottingham
	Report

Castle Park
Attendance: 1,449
Referee: Dean Richards

19 January 2008

Moseley	P - P	Launceston

- Postponed. Game rescheduled to 11 April 2008.

19 January 2008

London Welsh	16 - 10	Pertemps Bees
	Report

Old Deer Park
Attendance: 647
Referee: Rowan Kitt

19 January 2008

Plymouth Albion	5 - 44	Northampton Saints
	Report

Brickfields
Attendance: 6,271
Referee: Dale Newitt

19 January 2008

Rotherham Titans	13 - 25	Coventry
	Report

Clifton Lane
Attendance: 647
Referee: Rowan Kitt

19 January 2008

Sedgley Park	13 - 15	Esher
	Report

Park Lane
Attendance: 543
Referee: Keith Lewis

20 January 2008

Cornish Pirates	28 - 6	Newbury
	Report

Recreation Ground
Attendance: 2,398
Referee: Llyr Apgeraint-Roberts

=== Round 21 ===
26 January 2008

Coventry	19 - 24	Bedford Blues
	Report

Butts Park Arena
Attendance: 1,764
Referee: Andrew Vertigan

26 January 2008

Esher	17 - 36	Rotherham Titans
	Report

Moseley Road
Attendance: 942
Referee: Craig Joubert

26 January 2008

Exeter Chiefs	39 - 29	Cornish Pirates
	Report

Sandy Park
Attendance: 5,859
Referee: Dale Newitt

26 January 2008

Launceston	17 - 16	Plymouth Albion
	Report

Polson Bridge
Attendance: 2,231
Referee: Rowan Kitt

26 January 2008

Newbury	22 - 24	Moseley
	Report

Monk's Lane
Attendance: 600

26 January 2008

Northampton Saints	96 - 3	Sedgley Park
	Report

Franklin's Gardens
Attendance: 11,205
Referee: Nick Williams

26 January 2008

Pertemps Bees	22 - 20	Doncaster Knights
	Report

Sharmans Cross
Attendance: 707
Referee: Adrian Hartwell

27 January 2008

Nottingham	34 - 6	London Welsh
	Report

Meadow Lane
Attendance: 1,435
Referee: David Rose

=== Round 22 ===
9 February 2008

Launceston	24 - 15	Pertemps Bees
	Report

Polson Bridge
Attendance: 898
Referee: Martin Fox

9 February 2008

London Welsh	12 - 31	Exeter Chiefs
	Report

Old Deer Park
Attendance: 870
Referee: Llyr Apgeraint-Roberts

9 February 2008

Moseley	22 - 20	Coventry
	Report

Billesley
Attendance: 1,358
Referee: Ashley Rowden

9 February 2008

Plymouth Albion	6 - 13	Bedford Blues
	Report

Brickfields
Attendance: 2,511
Referee: Rowan Kitt

9 February 2008

Rotherham Titans	P - P	Newbury

- Postponed. Game rescheduled to 11 April 2008.

9 February 2008

Sedgley Park	26 - 43	Nottingham
	Report

Park Lane
Attendance: 587
Referee: Mark Wilson

10 February 2008

Cornish Pirates	70 - 10	Esher
	Report

Recreation Ground
Attendance: 2,315
Referee: David Rose

10 February 2008

Doncaster Knights	10 - 36	Northampton Saints
	Report

Castle Park
Attendance: 3,075
Referee: JP Doyle

=== Round 23 ===
16 February 2008

Bedford Blues	15 - 17	Cornish Pirates
	Report

Goldington Road
Attendance: 2,539
Referee: Dale Newitt

16 February 2008

Coventry	29 - 10	Plymouth Albion
	Report

Butts Park Arena
Attendance: 1,214
Referee: Richard Draper

16 February 2008

Doncaster Knights	39 - 12	Sedgley Park
	Report

Castle Park
Attendance: 749
Referee: Andrew Vertigan

16 February 2008

Esher	10 - 41	Northampton Saints
	Report

Moseley Road
Attendance: 2,500
Referee: Adrian Hartwell

16 February 2008

London Welsh	38 - 0	Launceston
	Report

Old Deer Park
Attendance: 807
Referee: Mark Wilson

16 February 2008

Newbury	25 - 20	Exeter Chiefs
	Report

Monk's Lane
Attendance: 775
Referee: Ashley Rowden

16 February 2008

Pertemps Bees	10 - 12	Nottingham
	Report

Sharmans Cross
Attendance: 577
Referee: Nick Williams

16 February 2008

Rotherham Titans	11 - 13	Moseley
	Report

Clifton Lane
Attendance: 980
Referee: Martin Fox

=== Round 17 (rescheduled game) ===
23 February 2008

Newbury	12 - 20	London Welsh
	Report

Monk's Lane
Attendance: 444
Referee: Richard Draper

=== Round 24 ===
1 March 2008

Esher	20 - 15	Newbury
	Report

Molesey Road
Attendance: 626
Referee: Mark Wilson

1 March 2008

Exeter Chiefs	36 - 0	Pertemps Bees
	Report

Sandy Park
Attendance: 3,718
Referee: Llyr Apgeraint-Roberts

1 March 2008

Launceston	17 - 29	Coventry
	Report

Polson Bridge
Attendance: 729
Referee: Dean Richards

1 March 2008

Moseley	6 - 13	London Welsh
	Report

Billesley
Attendance: 966
Referee: Dale Newitt

1 March 2008

Northampton Saints	73 - 0	Rotherham Titans
	Report

Franklin's Gardens
Attendance: 11,406
Referee: Chris White

1 March 2008

Plymouth Albion	11 - 15	Doncaster Knights
	Report

Brickfields
Attendance: 2,904
Referee: Nick Williams

1 March 2008

Sedgley Park	7 - 22	Bedford Blues
	Report

Park Lane
Attendance: 559
Referee: Chris Sharp

2 March 2008

Nottingham	24 - 17	Cornish Pirates
	Report

Meadow Lane
Attendance: 1,517
Referee: JP Doyle

=== Round 15 (rescheduled game) ===
4 March 2008

Launceston	7 - 72	Northampton Saints
	Report

Franklin's Gardens
Attendance: 8,201
Referee: Llyr Apgeraint-Roberts

- Launceston had to play 'home game' at Franklin's Gardens due to issues with Polson Bridge floodlights

=== Round 25 ===
8 March 2008

Bedford Blues	22 - 0	London Welsh
	Report

Goldington Road
Attendance: 1,595
Referee: Adrian Hartwell

8 March 2008

Coventry	26 - 17	Esher
	Report

Butts Park Arena
Attendance: 910
Referee: Keith Lewis

8 March 2008

Doncaster Knights	55 - 5	Moseley
	Report

Castle Park
Attendance: 723

8 March 2008

Exeter Chiefs	62 - 0	Launceston
	Report

Sandy Park
Attendance: 4,125
Referee: Greg Garner

8 March 2008

Newbury	19 - 39	Nottingham
	Report

Monk's Lane
Attendance: 501
Referee: Rob Debney

8 March 2008

Pertemps Bees	17 - 27	Northampton Saints
	Report

Sharmans Cross
Attendance: 1,577
Referee: Rowan Kitt

8 March 2008

Rotherham Titans	34 - 22	Plymouth Albion
	Report

Clifton Lane
Attendance: 809
Referee: Andrew Vertigan

9 March 2008

Cornish Pirates	36 - 10	Sedgley Park
	Report

Recreation Ground
Attendance: 2,410
Referee: Nick Williams

=== Round 16 (rescheduled game) ===
15 March 2008

Rotherham Titans	24 - 30	Pertemps Bees
	Report

Clifton Lane
Attendance: 607
Referee: Richard Draper

=== Round 26 ===
22 March 2008

Esher	21 - 17	Pertemps Bees
	Report

Molesey Road
Attendance: Ashley Rowden
Referee: 568

22 March 2008

London Welsh	25 - 26	Rotherham Titans
	Report

Old Deer Park
Attendance: 784
Referee: Terry Hall

22 March 2008

Moseley	5 - 43	Bedford Blues
	Report

Billesley
Attendance: 900
Referee: Tony Spreadbury

22 March 2008

Newbury	7 - 7	Coventry
	Report

Monk's Lane
Attendance: 510
Referee: Llyr Apgeraint-Roberts

22 March 2008

Northampton Saints	18 - 8	Exeter Chiefs
	Report

Franklin's Gardens
Attendance: 13,498
Referee: Greg Garner

22 March 2008

Plymouth Albion	25 - 19	Sedgley Park
	Report

Brickfields
Attendance: 2,181

23 March 2008

Cornish Pirates	63 - 36	Doncaster Knights
	Report

Recreation Ground
Attendance: 2,860
Referee: JP Doyle

23 March 2008

Nottingham	26 - 12	Launceston
	Report

Meadow Lane
Attendance: 1,449
Referee: Tim Wigglesworth

=== Round 27 ===
29 March 2008

Coventry	29 - 13	Pertemps Bees
	Report

Butts Park
Attendance: 1,125
Referee: Mark Wilson

29 March 2008

Doncaster Knights	11 - 3	Bedford Blues
	Report

Castle Park
Attendance: 840
Referee: Greg Garner

29 March 2008

Exeter Chiefs	26 - 0	Esher
	Report

Sandy Park
Attendance: 3,672
Referee: Chris Sharp

29 March 2008

Launceston	27 - 5	Newbury
	Report

Polson Bridge
Attendance: 780
Referee: JP Doyle

29 March 2008

Northampton Saints	17 - 10	Nottingham
	Report

Franklin's Gardens
Attendance: 11,423
Referee: Dale Newitt

29 March 2008

Plymouth Albion	13 - 16	Moseley
	Report

Brickfields
Attendance: 2,460
Referee: Andrew Vertigan

29 March 2008

Rotherham Titans	20 - 10	Cornish Pirates
	Report

Clifton Lane
Attendance: 914
Referee: Tim Wigglesworth

29 March 2008

Sedgley Park	18 - 24	London Welsh
	Report

Park Lane
Attendance: Dean Richards
Referee: 528

=== Round 28 ===
4 April 2008

Bedford Blues	56 - 17	Rotherham Titans
	Report

Goldington Road
Attendance: 2,051
Referee: Chris Sharp

4 April 2008

Coventry	16 - 48	Northampton Saints
	Report

Butts Park Arena
Attendance: 3,100
Referee: Llyr Geraint-Roberts

4 April 2008

Esher	0 - 41	Launceston
	Report

Molesey Road
Attendance: 426
Referee: Dean Richards

4 April 2008

London Welsh	29 - 3	Doncaster Knights
	Report

Old Deer Park
Attendance: 1,025
Referee: Terry Hall

4 April 2008

Pertemps Bees	20 - 16	Newbury
	Report

Sharmans Cross
Attendance: 550
Referee: JP Doyle

4 April 2008

Sedgley Park	16 - 6	Moseley
	Report

Park Lane
Attendance: 524
Referee: Martin Fox

5 April 2008

Cornish Pirates	17 - 17	Plymouth Albion
	Report

Recreation Ground
Attendance: 4,876
Referee: Rowan Kitt

5 April 2008

Nottingham	24 - 14	Exeter Chiefs
	Report

Meadow Lane
Attendance: 1,905
Referee: Greg Garner

=== Round 20 & 22 (rescheduled games) ===
11 April 2008

Moseley	10 - 12	Launceston
	Report

Billesley
Attendance: 741
Referee: Llyr Geraint-Roberts

11 April 2008

Rotherham Titans	71 - 13	Newbury
	Report

Clifton Lane
Referee: 984

=== Round 29 ===
18 April 2008

Esher	7 - 31	Nottingham
	Report

Molesey Road
Attendance: 682
Referee: A Falzone

18 April 2008

Exeter Chiefs	45 - 12	Coventry
	Report

Sandy Park
Attendance: 4,520
Referee: Keith Lewis

18 April 2008

Launceston	18 - 22	Bedford Blues
	Report

Polson Bridge
Attendance: 1,662
Referee: Adrian Hartwell

18 April 2008

London Welsh	22 - 10	Plymouth Albion
	Report

Old Deer Park
Attendance: 1,037

18 April 2008

Moseley	29 - 20	Cornish Pirates
	Report

Billesley
Attendance: 784
Referee: David Rose

18 April 2008

Newbury	22 - 40	Northampton Saints
	Report

Monk's Lane
Attendance: 2,345
Referee: Mark Wilson

18 April 2008

Pertemps Bees	19 - 11	Sedgley Park
	Report

Sharmans Cross
Attendance: 550
Referee: Ashley Rowden

18 April 2008

Rotherham Titans	15 - 52	Doncaster Knights
	Report

Clifton Lane
Attendance: 1,846
Referee: Greg Garner

=== Round 30 ===
25 April 2008

Bedford Blues	10 - 21	Pertemps Bees
	Report

Goldington Road
Attendance: 2,261
Referee: Dean Richards

25 April 2008

Cornish Pirates	18 - 31	London Welsh
	Report

Recreation Ground
Attendance: 4,682
Referee: Graham Knox

25 April 2008

Coventry	24 - 27	Nottingham
	Report

Butts Park Arena
Attendance: 1,212
Referee: Terry Hall

25 April 2008

Doncaster Knights	17 - 25	Exeter Chiefs
	Report

Castle Park
Attendance: 1,257
Referee: Llyr Apgeraint-Roberts

25 April 2008

Moseley	50 - 14	Esher
	Report

Billesley
Attendance: 1,196
Referee: Ashley Rowden

25 April 2008

Northampton Saints	81 - 0	Launceston
	Report

Franklin's Gardens
Attendance: 12,659
Referee: Nick Williams

25 April 2008

Plymouth Albion	35 - 7	Newbury
	Report

Brickfields
Attendance: 3,094
Referee: Keith Lewis

25 April 2008

Sedgley Park	41 - 12	Rotherham Titans
	Report

Park Lane
Attendance: 685
Referee: Tim Wigglesworth

== Total season attendances ==
Club	Home games	Total	Average	Highest	Lowest	% capacity
Bedford Blues	15	35,128	2,342	5,307	1,590	44%
Cornish Pirates	15	52,294	3,486	6,487	2,275	39%
Coventry	15	20,490	1,366	3,100	873	34%
Doncaster Knights	15	18,939	1,263	3,075	500	41%
Esher	15	13,593	906	2,500	426	30%
Exeter Chiefs	15	60,466	4,031	5,859	2,820	67%
Launceston	15 (Note: Launceston would play their 'home' game against Northampton Saints in Northampton due to floodlight issues which would have the knock on effect of boosting their season attendance figures as 8,201 supporters turned up to watch this game, almost all of whom were Saints fans.)	25,307	1,687	8,201	729	55%
London Welsh	15	14,653	977	2,400	420	22%
Moseley	15	13,608	907	1,358	675	30%
Newbury	15	10,756	717	2,345	402	9%
Northampton Saints	15	172,408	11,494	13,498	10,071	85%
Nottingham	15	22,448	1,497	4,751	932	8%
Pertemps Bees	15	9,791	653	1,577	350	19%
Plymouth Albion	15	48,348	3,223	6,381	2,132	50%
Rotherham Titans	15	17,095	1,140	2,807	607	46%
Sedgley Park	15	9,401	627	1,325	467	21%

== Individual statistics ==
- Note that points scorers includes tries as well as conversions, penalties and drop goals.

=== Top points scorers ===
Rank	Player	Team	Appearances	Points
1	(Ireland) Gareth Steenson	Cornish Pirates	27	287
2	(England) Mark Woodrow	Doncaster Knights	30	263
3	(New Zealand) Bruce Reihana	Northampton Saints	29	262
4	(England) Phil Jones	Sedgley Park	29	225
5	(England) Ross Laidlaw	Plymouth Albion	27	209
6	(England) Chris Ashton	Northampton Saints	25	197
7	(Canada) James Pritchard	Bedford Blues	23	196
8	(England) Stephen Myler	Northampton Saints	25	190
9	(Wales) Matthew Jones	Moseley / London Welsh	24	181
10	(England) Danny Gray	Exeter Chiefs	19	172

=== Top try scorers ===
Rank	Player	Team	Appearances	Tries
1	(England) Chris Ashton	Northampton Saints	25	39
2	(New Zealand) Bruce Reihana	Northampton Saints	29	28
3	(England) Josh Drauniniu	Exeter Chiefs	27	22
4	(England) Jason Luff	Exeter Chiefs	26	19
5	(England) Paul Diggin	Northampton Saints	24	17
5	(England) Matt Jess	Launceston	30	17
6	(England) Chris Briers	Sedgley Park	28	14
7	(South Africa) Donovan van Vuuren	Doncaster Knights	18	13
7	(England) Luke Sherriff	Nottingham	19	13
8	(England) Paul Devlin	Cornish Pirates	19	11
8	(England) Alex Page	Bedford Blues	24	11
8	(England) Paul Sampson	London Welsh	28	11
8	(Scotland) Douglas Flockhart	Esher	29	11
8	(Wales) Bryn Griffiths	Doncaster Knights	29	11

== Season records ==
=== Team ===
Largest home win — 93 pts

96 - 3 Northampton Saints at home to Sedgley Park on 26 January 2008

Largest away win — 51 pts

59 - 8 Northampton Saints away to Sedgley Park on 6 October 2007

Most points scored — 93 pts

96 - 3 Northampton Saints at home to Sedgley Park on 26 January 2008

Most tries in a match — 14

Northampton Saints at home to Sedgley Park on 26 January 2008

Most conversions in a match — 13

Northampton Saints at home to Sedgley Park on 26 January 2008

Most penalties in a match — 6

Cornish Pirates at home to Exeter Chiefs on 7 October 2007

Most drop goals in a match — 3

Exeter Chiefs away to Plymouth Albion on 8 September 2007

=== Player ===
Most points in a match — 36

(New Zealand) Bruce Reihana for Northampton Saints at home to Sedgley Park on 26 January 2008

Most tries in a match — 6

(England) Chris Ashton for Northampton Saints at home to Launceston on 26 April 2008

Most conversions in a match — 13

(New Zealand) Bruce Reihana for Northampton Saints at home to Sedgley Park on 26 January 2008

Most penalties in a match — 6

(Ireland) Gareth Steenson for Cornish Pirates at home to Exeter Chiefs on 7 October 2007

Most drop goals in a match — 3

(England) Danny Gray for Exeter Chiefs away to Plymouth Albion on 8 September 2007

=== Attendances ===
Highest — 13,498

Northampton Saints at home to Exeter Chiefs on 22 March 2008

Lowest — 350 (x2)

Pertemps Bees (twice) at home to Plymouth Albion on 15 September 2007 & Esher on 10 November 2007

Highest Average Attendance — 11,494

Northampton Saints

Lowest Average Attendance — 627

Sedgley Park

== See also ==
- English rugby union system
