= Matthew Nuthall =

- Born: Matthew Dean Nuthall; 6 July 1983 (age 43) Pontypridd, Wales
- Height: 6 ft 1 in (1.85 m)
- Weight: 14 st 10 lb (93 kg)

Rugby union career
- Position(s): Wing; Fullback
- Current team: Caerphilly RFC
Senior career
Years	Team	Apps	(Points)
- Pontypridd RFC
–	Cardiff Blues		
–	Cardiff RFC		
–	Pertemps Bees		
–	Neath RFC		

Matthew Dean Nuthall (born 6 July 1983, in Pontypridd, Wales) is a rugby union player for Pontypridd RFC in the Principality Premiership. Nuthall shot to fame at the end of the 2001/02 season with a man of the match performance in his first ever senior outing for Pontypridd against Bridgend. His rise to stardom continued with a place in the Ponty team which clinched the 2002 Welsh Cup against Llanelli, whilst still qualified at the youth age level. Nuthall was drafted into the Celtic Warriors regional squad in 2003, but turning out regularly for Pontypridd at club level.

Following a spell contracted to the Cardiff Blues, and turning out for Cardiff RFC in the Premiership, Nuthall returned to Ponty for the 2005 - 2006 campaign, scoring a crucial try in the club's victorious Konica Minolta Cup Final appearance. In the summer of 2006 Nuthall once more moved on from Sardis Road, joining up with the Pertemps Bees in English League division two. From Pertemps Bees he moved to Neath, before once again re-joining his hometown club in the summer of 2009.

Nuthall is currently a player coach at Caerphilly RFC.
