= Russell Earnshaw =

English rugby union player & coach

- Born: Russell Dean Earnshaw; 8 April 1975 (age 51) Stockton-on-Tees, England
- Height: 6 ft 4 in (1.93 m)

Rugby union career
- Position(s): Lock, Back row
Senior career
Years	Team	Apps	(Points)
1997-2000	Bath Rugby	52	
2000	Bedford Blues	1	
2000	Barbarian F.C.	1	
2000-2003	Rotherham Titans	72	
2003-2007	Doncaster Rugby	80	
2007-2012	Pertemps Bees	96	
International career
Years	Team	Apps	(Points)
- England Sevens
Coaching career
- Years: Team
- England Sevens (assistant)

Russell Dean Earnshaw (born 8 April 1975) is a rugby union coach currently working in sport and business with the Magic Academy.

== Club rugby ==
Earnshaw has played Premiership rugby with West Hartlepool, Bath Rugby and Rotherham Titans, winning the European Cup whilst at Bath. He then joined Worcester in Division 1 and helped them to win promotion to the Premiership before signing for Doncaster with whom he achieved Promotion to the Championship. While at University at Cambridge he played for the Blues side in two winning Varsity matches. In 2000 he was selected to play for the Barbarians in their match against Germany.

== International rugby ==
Earnshaw has played for England on the IRB Sevens circuit, at the 1998 Commonwealth Games in Kuala Lumpur, and was part of the squad that played in the IRB World Series tournaments from 1999 to 2003. He was assistant coach to the England 7's team from 2006-2013, finishing after the 2013 World Cup final defeat to New Zealand.

== Coaching ==
While at Doncaster Earnshaw helped to coach the side and joined Pertemps Bees for the 07/08 season as player/forwards coach. Whilst there, he was head coach of Birmingham and Solihull Rugby Club and assistant coach of the England 7's team.

In 2010, Earnshaw completed the 'Great Escape' for Birmingham & Solihull Rugby Club, leading them to an unexpected resurgence in the relegation playoffs, despite not having won a game for the entire season. Although Earnshaw dislocated his shoulder in the penultimate game; a defeat at home at the hands of relegation-rivals Coventry, Earnshaw lined up on the pitch at Billesley Common two weeks later to help the Bees in their 34-38 defeat of Moseley.

Between 2007 and 2013, England won several tournaments on the World Series including back-to-back Dubai titles in 2011 and 2012, the Twickenham Sevens in 2009, plus England's first ever victory in Wellington in 2009 and more recently again in 2013. In 2013, England won the silver medal at the 7's Rugby World Cup in Moscow.

Earnshaw also coached the GB Students side to World University Champions in 2012 and England U18's Women's team to the European title in 2014.

Earnshaw also took a sabbatical from sport to teach Economics and coach rugby at Eastbourne College, he is a Level 4 RFU coach, Coach Developer, Coach Educator and Level 4 mentor.

Having coached both England U18's and U20's, Earnshaw now works across sports and business including NZ7's, Oyonnax Rugby, Google, Tyler-Grange, GB Hockey and the FA and Premier League.
