= Ben Harvey (rugby union) =

English rugby union player

- Born: Benjamin John Harvey; 26 June 1974 (age 52) Redruth, England

Rugby union career
- Position: Fly-half
Senior career
Years	Team	Apps	(Points)
1995–96	Bristol		
1996–98	Richmond		
1998–2001	Worcester		
2001–05	Stourbridge		
2005–07	Pertemps Bees		
International career
Years	Team	Apps	(Points)
- England sevens
Coaching career
- Years: Team
- 2007: Pertemps Bees
- 2008–13: Jersey
- 2004: Kenya sevens

Benjamin John Harvey (born 26 June 1974) is a rugby union coach and former player from Redruth, England.

== Playing career ==
Harvey played rugby as a Fly-half. During his career he played for Bristol under the captaincy of future England and British and Irish Lions captain, Martin Corry. In 1996, he left Bristol for Richmond before leaving after the 1997–98 season. After his time at Richmond, Harvey moved to Worcester Warriors. Harvey then moved to Stourbridge RFC in 2001. During his playing career, he also played for the England national rugby sevens team. During his time at Stourbridge Ben became a regular scorer in National League 1 and is one of the top scorers in the division of all time.

== Coaching career ==
In 2004, Harvey coached the Kenya national rugby sevens team. In 2005, Harvey left Stourbridge to move to Pertemps Bees as a player/coach. He became the coach of the backs. In 2007, after the head coach was made redundant, Harvey was appointed as the head coach of Pertemps Bees however he was removed from his position after fifteen games because of poor results. In 2008, Harvey was appointed as professional head coach to Jersey and later became Jersey's director of rugby as well as head coach after the incumbent stood down to become the vice-president of Jersey. During Harvey's time at Jersey, he coached them through five consecutive promotions to the RFU Championship from London 2 South. In 2011, Harvey led calls for the States of Jersey to construct a new sports centre in Jersey in order to improve sports facilities in Jersey. In 2012, he was awarded the "Coach of the Year Award" in the CI Sports Personality of the Year awards.
