= Chris Ashton =

England dual-code rugby international footballer

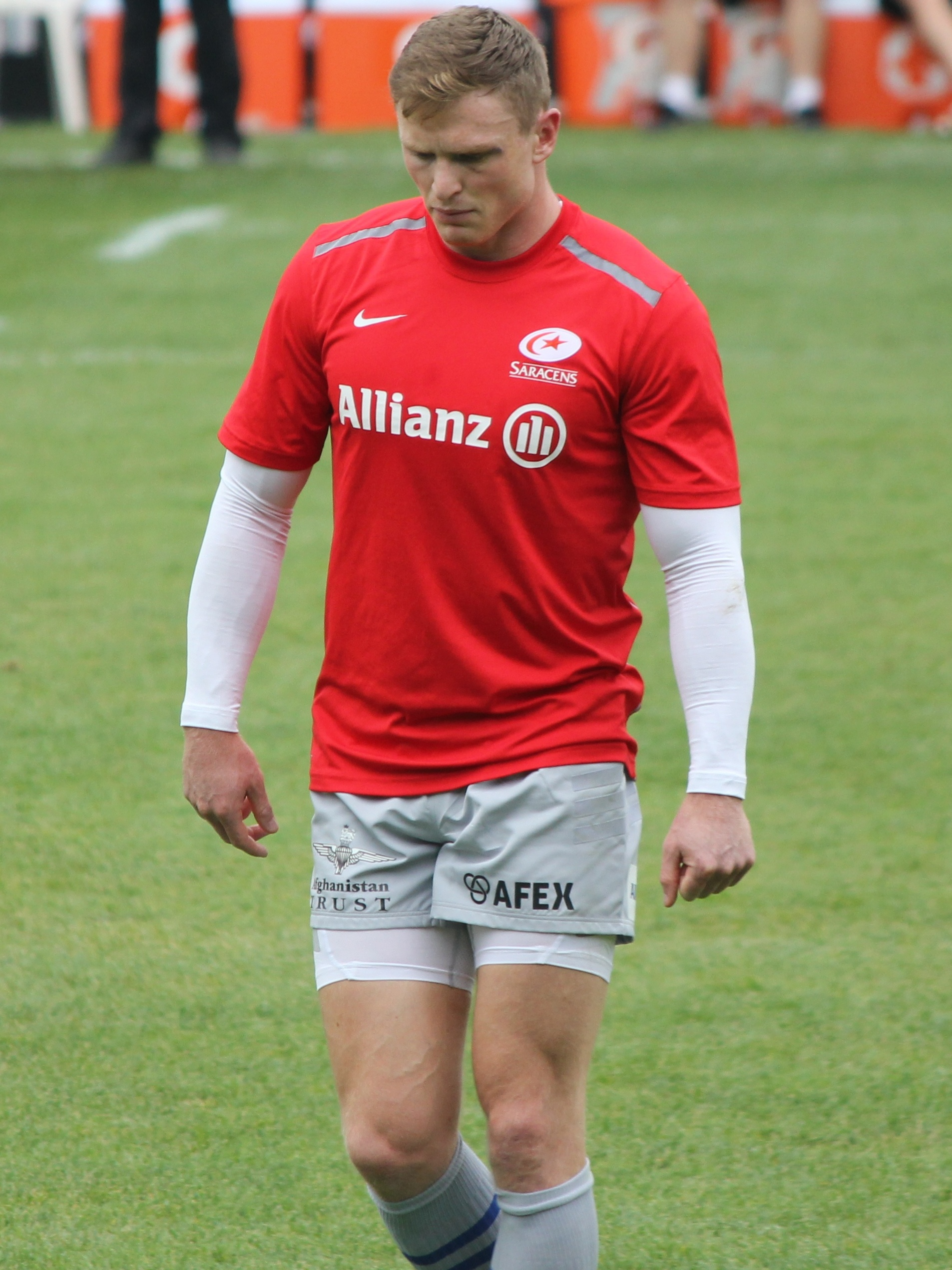

Personal information
- Born: Christopher John Ashton; 29 March 1987 (age 39) Wigan, Greater Manchester, England
- Height: 6 ft 0 in (1.83 m)
- Weight: 14 st 7 lb; 92 kg (203 lb)

Playing information
- Position: Wing, Fullback
Club
Years	Team	Pld	T	G	FG	P
2005–07	Wigan Warriors	52	28	2	0	116
Representative
Years	Team	Pld	T	G	FG	P
2006	England	4	3	0	0	12

Rugby union career
- Position(s): Wing, Fullback
Senior career
Years	Team	Apps	(Points)
2007–2012	Northampton	110	(467)
2012–2017	Saracens	105	(235)
2017–2018	Toulon	30	(130)
2018–2020	Sale Sharks	32	(85)
2020–2021	Harlequins	7	(10)
2021	Worcester Warriors	4	(5)
2022–2023	Leicester Tigers	27	(65)
2007–2023	Total	315	(992)
- Correct as of 7 May 2023
International career
Years	Team	Apps	(Points)
2010–2019	England	44	(100)
- Correct as of 8 February 2019

Christopher John Ashton (born 29 March 1987) is a retired English rugby union and former rugby league footballer, one of the few players who have represented England in both rugby codes. Ashton primarily played wing and secondarily played fullback.

Ashton first played as a fullback or wing for Wigan Warriors in rugby league's Super League competition and won four caps for England in 2006 and 2007.

In 2007 Ashton signed for Northampton Saints in rugby union's Premiership, before moving to Saracens in 2012, Toulon in 2017, Sale in 2018 and Harlequins in 2020; he finished his career at Leicester Tigers in 2023. He made his debut for England in March 2010 and played regularly until 2014, including in the 2011 Rugby World Cup where he finished as the tournament's joint leading try-scorer. After a break of four years, he was recalled to the England squad in November 2018. In April 2022 he became the record try scorer in Premiership Rugby after scoring a hat trick against Bristol to take him to 95 tries, in April 2023 he became the first player to 100 tries after another hat trick against Exeter Chiefs. In all Ashton won 40 caps for England.

== Rugby league career ==
=== Wigan Warriors ===
Ashton's position at Wigan Warriors was normally fullback, although he also played on the wing. He came through Wigan's scholarship programme and played for Wigan's U18s in 2003. He made his senior debut in Wigan's last match of the 2005 season, and scored two of their seven tries in a 36–22 victory over Huddersfield Giants.

Ashton was brought into the Wigan squad at the start of 2006 as replacement for the injured Kris Radlinski. He was one of the most consistent players for Wigan during their disappointing Super League XI season and was a contender for the Young Player of the Year award. He finished the 2006 season with 15 tries from 29 appearances making him the leading try scorer for Wigan. Ashton was given the number 1 shirt, previously worn by Radlinski, at the start of 2007 despite the arrival of former Bradford Bulls full back Michael Withers.

Ashton made 52 appearances in total for the Cherry and Whites, scoring 28 tries.

=== International ===
Ashton was selected for the 2004 Academy Origin Series and the 2004 victorious England Academy U-18s tour to Australia.

Although some criticisms were made about his defensive abilities, he earned a call into the England squad at the end of 2006 while Great Britain were on tour in Australia and New Zealand. Ashton made his England debut against France on 22 October 2006 in the Federation Shield tournament. He played in all four Federation Shield matches, which concluded with England winning the competition, and he scored three tries in his four games.

== Rugby union career ==
=== Club career ===
==== Northampton Saints ====
On 19 March 2007 it was announced that Ashton had signed to play rugby union for Northampton Saints, after Wigan granted him an early release from his contract.

On 1 September 2007, Ashton made his debut for Northampton at Franklin's Gardens as a late substitute for Will Harries against London Welsh in National Division One. He scored his first try for the club, with his first touch of the ball, in the same game which Saints won 44–11.

The following week he scored for Northampton's second team, Northampton Wanderers. and a substitute scoring appearance against Moseley.

In 2008, Ashton broke the National Division One try scoring record, scoring 39 tries (and one conversion) from only 25 appearances.

Despite a relatively disappointing 2008–09 season, with many appearances in the Wanderers and struggling to make it into the first team regularly, in the 2009–10 season Ashton embarked on a run of form that brought 15 tries in 16 games in all competitions including Heineken Cup efforts against Munster and Perpignan.

Ashton was named as the Premiership player of the season for 2009–10.

On 19 January 2012, it was announced that Ashton had signed with Saracens, and joined up with his new team for the start of the 2012–13 season.

==== Saracens ====
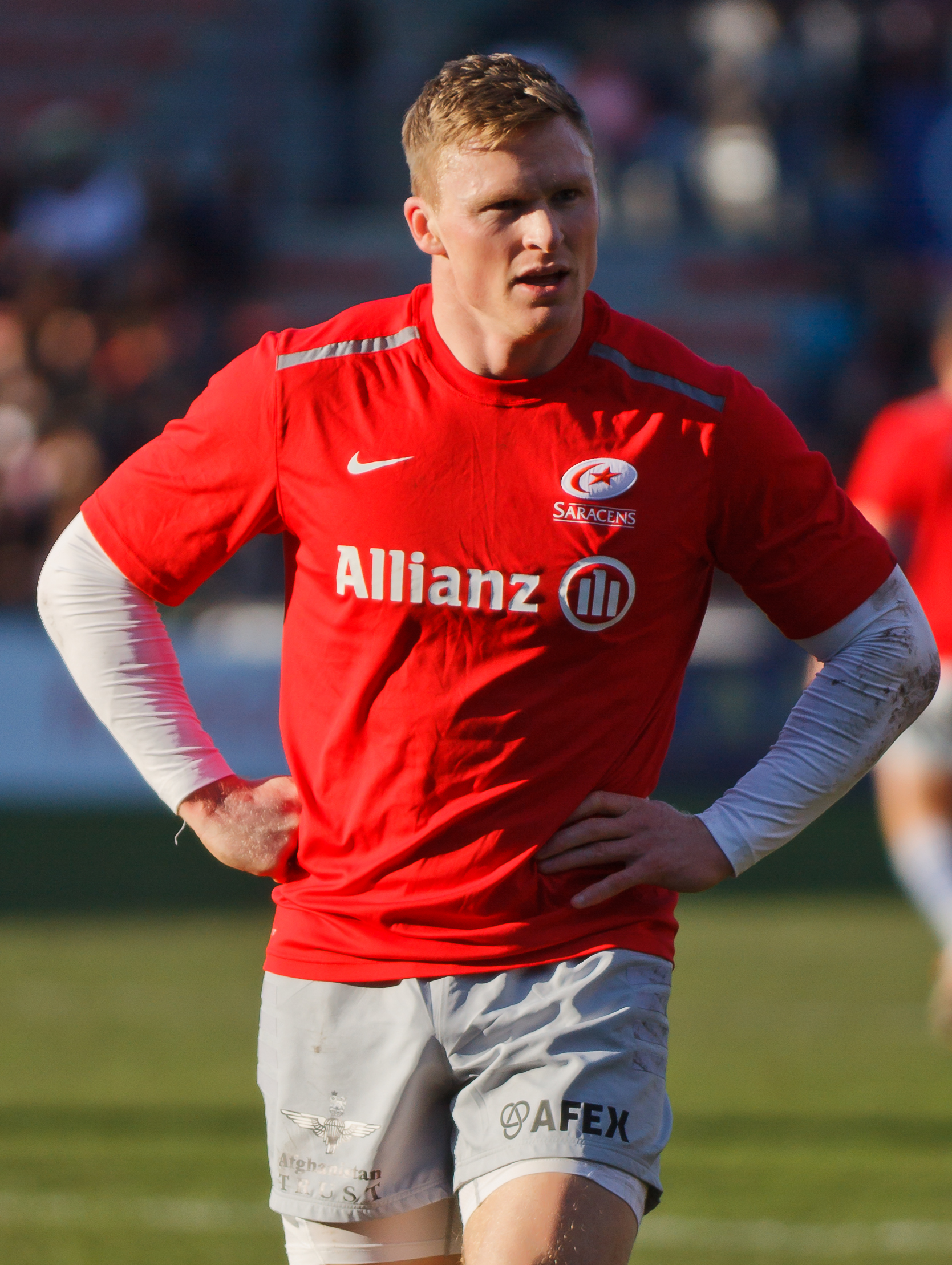
Chris Ashton in January 2014

Ashton's Saracens contract was rumoured to be worth £250,000 per season. On 1 September 2012, he made his Saracens debut against London Irish. He scored two tries on his début, in a game which Saracens won 40–3.

Saracens finished the 2012–13 regular season at the top of the table, 3 points ahead of Leicester Tigers. However, in the play-offs they lost their semi-final match against Northampton, Ashton's former club, by 13 points to 27. Ashton scored a total of 6 tries that season.

In the 2013–14 season, Saracens again finished the regular season as league leaders, 9 points clear of Northampton. They then won their semi-final against Harlequins, including a try from Ashton in the 61st minute. However, in a hard-fought final at Twickenham they again lost to Northampton, by 20 points to 24. Ashton finished the season joint-4th in the try scoring table, with a total of 8 tries.

In the 2014–15 Premiership season, Saracens qualified for the play-offs in 4th place, with the same number of points as Exeter Chiefs (68), but taking the 4th spot on account of losing one less game than Exeter. In the semi-final Saracens again came up against Northampton, with the added disadvantage of playing away at Franklin's Gardens. However Saracens produced a strong defensive performance, with fly-half Owen Farrell producing an impressive kicking display, which saw Saracens win 29 points to 24. Ashton was on the replacements' bench.

In the final at Twickenham, Saracens played Bath, who had a strong set of backs, all of whom were England internationals, and were expected to be tough opponents. However, Bath's challenge faltered as Saracens established early control of the game and did not lose the lead, eventually winning 28–16. Ashton came on as a substitute in the 60th minute.

Ashton's strong performances throughout the season meant he finished in joint-2nd place on the try scoring tables with 13 tries, the same as fellow Saracens winger Chris Wyles, behind Exeter Chiefs forward Thomas Waldrom. Ashton's impressive form led to him being called back up to the England training squad for the 2015 Rugby World Cup, which was held in England throughout September–October, although he was not selected in the final 31-man squad for the tournament.

In the 2015-16 season Ashton helped Saracens to both the Premiership title and the European Rugby Champions Cup, starting both finals. In the 2016-17 season Ashton helped Saracens retain their European Rugby Champions Cup title, scoring a try in the final against Clermont.

Ashton received a 10-week ban in 2016 for eye-gouging; an appeal against the ban was dismissed. In September 2016 Ashton received a 13-week ban for biting Saints' Alex Waller in a premiership match on 17 September. He was free to play again on 19 December.

==== Toulon ====
In October 2016, Ashton signed for French club Toulon in the Top 14 from the 2017–18 season. Ashton played a single season in the Top 14, scoring 24 tries in 23 appearances to break the competition's try-scoring record previously held by Napolioni Nalaga.

==== Sale Sharks ====
On 3 July 2018 it was confirmed that Ashton was to return to England when he signed for Sale Sharks for the 2018–19 season.

Ashton left the club by mutual consent on 2 March 2020.

==== Harlequins ====
On 4 March 2020, after his contract was terminated by Sale Sharks, Ashton signed for Harlequins. Head of rugby Paul Gustard described him as "without doubt one of the most competitive, professional and dedicated athletes" he had come across.

==== Worcester Warriors ====
On 25 January 2021, Ashton was granted early release from Harlequins as he joins with Premiership rivals Worcester Warriors with immediate effect until the end of the 2021-22 season. On 13 December 2021, Worcester Warriors confirmed that Ashton had left the club by mutual consent.

==== Leicester Tigers ====
Ashton joined Leicester in February 2022 and made his debut against former club Northampton Saints on 12 February 2022, he made a try saving tackle while on during Freddie Burns' first half Head Injury Assessment, but was then sin binned in the 70th minute after replacing Guy Porter just 3 minutes earlier. Ashton scored his first try for Leicester against London Irish on 12 March 2022, then on 27 March 2022 he scored two tries in Leicester's win against Exeter Chiefs. The second of these tied the Premiership Rugby try scoring record on 92. On 30 April 2022, Ashton scored three tries against Bristol Bears to take the Premiership Rugby record outright with 95 tries.

Ashton started the 2022 Premiership Rugby final as Tigers beat his former side Saracens 15-12. On 16 April 2023 Ashton became the first player to score 100 tries in Premiership Rugby, scoring a hat trick against Exeter Chiefs he took his career total to 101. Earlier that week he had announced his retirement at the end of the season.

=== International career ===
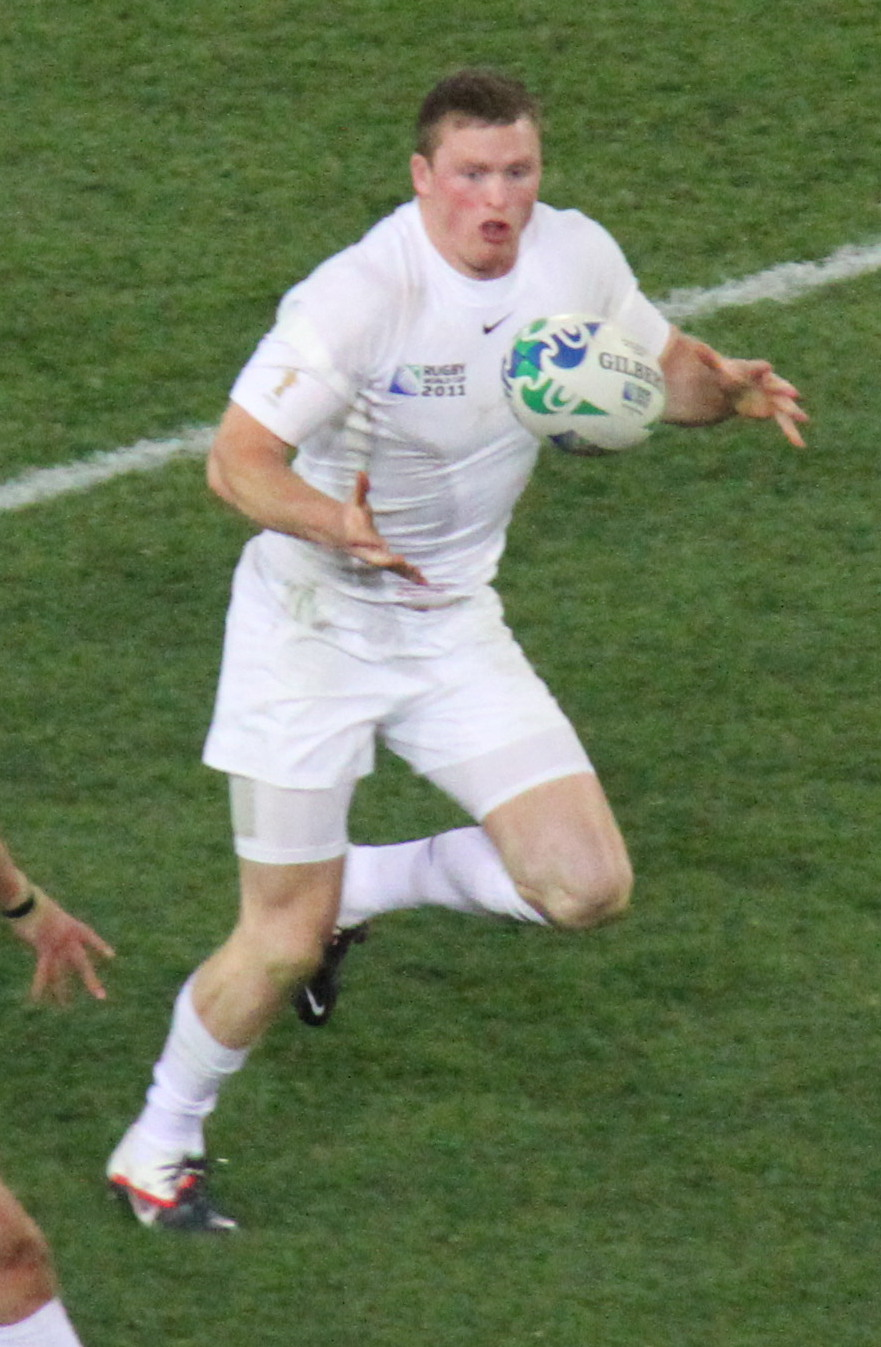
Ashton during 2011 RWC

England manager Martin Johnson called Ashton up to the senior squad for the 2010 Six Nations.

Ashton made his England debut against France on 20 March 2010 in Paris. He played left wing, the opposite side to his usual position with Northampton. He gave the scoring pass to fellow Saints player fullback Ben Foden, who was also making his first Six Nations start.

Ashton was taken on the summer tour to Australia, and played in both Test matches. Although England lost the first Test, they won the second 20–21. Ashton scored his first international try in this match. On 13 November 2010, England defeated Australia at Twickenham. Ashton was the hero of the match with two tries in a 35–18 victory, the second after a run from inside the England's 22-metre line.

Ashton scored two tries in England's opening match in the 2011 Six Nations against Wales at the Millennium Stadium on 4 February, with England winning the game 26–19. He followed this with four tries against Italy the following week, equalling the all-time Six Nations record with six tries in a season. This performance also meant he is the first person in the Six Nations to score four tries in a single match. His famous swallow dive celebration (dubbed the 'Ash Splash') was used to celebrate two of these tries.

Ashton represented England at the 2011 Rugby World Cup in New Zealand and finished as the tournament's joint leading try-scorer with six.

He started all five matches for England in the 2012 Six Nations, and in May 2012 scored a hat-trick of tries as England beat the Barbarians 57–26 in a non-cap fixture at Twickenham. Ashton went on the 2012 summer tour to South Africa in which he started all three Test matches.

Ashton started all five matches for England in the 2013 Six Nations Championship, scoring a try in the first match against Scotland. England took the championship down to the final game against Wales, however suffered a heavy 30–3 defeat at the Millennium Stadium as Wales took the title. Ashton later played in all three of England's matches in the 2013 autumn internationals, scoring a try in their win over Argentina.

Ashton lost his place in the England elite squad, not playing in any of their games in the 2014 Six Nations. He did however play in England's mid-year games against the All Blacks in New Zealand, all three of which England lost. Again, Ashton's defensive capabilities were the subject of much discussion during this campaign and he did not play for England during the 2014 autumn internationals or 2015 Six Nations.

However, during Saracens' ultimately winning campaign in the 2014–15 premiership season, Ashton consistently performed at a high level and this promising form resulted in Stuart Lancaster recalling him back into the England camp, including him in his 50-man training squad for that year's 2015 World Cup, alongside fellow Saracens winger David Strettle, who had not played for England since 2008. Ashton was the subject of much media focus during England's World Cup training programme. Ashton was dropped from the squad some 6 weeks before the tournament.

Following England's disappointing campaign at their home World Cup, failing to make it out of the pool stages as they lost to both Wales and Australia, Stuart Lancaster stepped down as England head coach and was replaced by Eddie Jones.

Jones began making some immediate changes to the England elite squad, including dropping several long-standing players and adding a number of new or returning players. This included Chris Ashton, who was named in the squad for the upcoming 2016 Six Nations Championship. However, Ashton was subsequently given a 10-week ban by the RFU for eye-gouging Luke Marshall during an ERCC match between Saracens and Ulster. Although Ashton appealed the ban, this was rejected and he therefore missed the entire 2016 Six Nations tournament and several games for Saracens.

A subsequent 13-week ban for biting also ruled Ashton ineligible for selection for the 2016 Autumn internationals.

Ashton's decision to join Toulon in October 2016 appeared to end his hopes of an England recall, as he would not be eligible for selection by playing outside England. However, he returned to England with Sale next year, notably after winning a game against England with the Barbarians at Twickenham in May 2018, scoring a hat trick in a performance that saw England conceding a record points total at Twickenham. This game might have brought Ashton much closer to coming back in Eddie Jones' squad.

Later in 2018, after being banned for seven weeks for a tip tackle in August 2018, was selected in the England squad for the Autumn internationals. In November 2018, he made his first England appearance in four years, coming off the bench in their 12–11 win over South Africa, before being named in the starting fifteen against New Zealand.

== Career honours ==
=== Northampton Saints ===
- European Challenge Cup Champion: 2008–09
- Anglo-Welsh Cup Champion: 2009–10
- RFU Championship Champion: 2007–08

=== Saracens ===
- Premiership Rugby Champion (2): 2014–15, 2015–16
- European Rugby Champions Cup Champion (2): 2015–16, 2016–17

=== Sale Sharks ===
- Premiership Rugby Cup Champion: 2019–20

=== Leicester Tigers ===
- Premiership Rugby Champion: 2021-2022

=== England ===
- Six Nations Championship Champion (2): 2011, 2019
- Calcutta Cup Champion (3): 2011, 2012, 2013
- Triple Crown Champion (1): 2014

== International statistics ==
NH = Tournament not held

=== Rugby league ===
Team	Year	Tests		World Cup		Total	
		Apps+Subs	Tries	Apps+Subs	Tries	Apps+Subs	Tries
England rugby league	2006	4+0	3	NA	NA	4+0	3
England rugby league	2007	0	0	NA	NA	0	0

=== International tries ===
As of 7 July 2019

Try	Opposing team	Location	Venue	Competition	Date	Result	Score
1	Australia	Sydney, Australia	Stadium Australia	2010 Tour of Australasia	19 June 2010	Win	21 – 20
2	Australia	London, England	Twickenham Stadium	2010 Autumn Internationals	13 November 2010	Win	35 – 18
3	Australia	London, England	Twickenham Stadium	2010 Autumn Internationals	13 November 2010	Win	35 – 18
4	Wales	Cardiff, Wales	Millennium Stadium	2011 Six Nations	12 February 2011	Win	26 – 19
5	Wales	Cardiff, Wales	Millennium Stadium	2011 Six Nations	12 February 2011	Win	26 – 19
6	Italy	London, England	Twickenham Stadium	2011 Six Nations	4 February 2011	Win	59 – 13
7	Italy	London, England	Twickenham Stadium	2011 Six Nations	4 February 2011	Win	59 – 13
8	Italy	London, England	Twickenham Stadium	2011 Six Nations	4 February 2011	Win	59 – 13
9	Italy	London, England	Twickenham Stadium	2011 Six Nations	4 February 2011	Win	59 – 13
10	Georgia	Dunedin, New Zealand	Forsyth Barr Stadium	2011 Rugby World Cup	18 September 2011	Win	41 – 10
11	Georgia	Dunedin, New Zealand	Forsyth Barr Stadium	2011 Rugby World Cup	18 September 2011	Win	41 – 10
12	Romania	Dunedin, New Zealand	Forsyth Barr Stadium	2011 Rugby World Cup	24 September 2011	Win	67 – 3
13	Romania	Dunedin, New Zealand	Forsyth Barr Stadium	2011 Rugby World Cup	24 September 2011	Win	67 – 3
14	Romania	Dunedin, New Zealand	Forsyth Barr Stadium	2011 Rugby World Cup	24 September 2011	Win	67 – 3
15	Scotland	Auckland, New Zealand	Eden Park	2011 Rugby World Cup	1 October 2011	Win	16 – 12
16	New Zealand	London, England	Twickenham Stadium	2012 Autumn Internationals	1 December 2012	Win	38 – 21
17	Scotland	London, England	Twickenham Stadium	2013 Six Nations	2 February 2013	Win	38 – 18
18	Argentina	London, England	Twickenham Stadium	2013 Autumn Internationals	9 November 2013	Win	31 – 12
19	New Zealand	Dunedin, New Zealand	Forsyth Barr Stadium	2014 Tour of New Zealand	14 June 2014	Loss	27 – 28
20	New Zealand	London, England	Twickenham Stadium	2018 Autumn Internationals	10 November 2018	Loss	15 – 16

== Club statistics ==
=== Rugby league ===
Club	Season	League		Challenge Cup	
		Apps	Tries	Apps	Tries
Wigan Warriors	2005 Super League X	2	1	0	0
Wigan Warriors	2006 Super League XI	26	13	2	1
Wigan Warriors	2007 Super League XII	19	10	3	2
Total	—N/a	47	24	5	3

=== Rugby union ===
Club	Season	League		Heineken / Champions Cup		Challenge Cup		Anglo-Welsh / Premiership Rugby Cup	
		Apps	Tries	Appearances	Tries	Apps	Tries	Appearances	Tries
Northampton Saints	National Division One 2007-08	25	39	—N/a	—N/a	—N/a	—N/a	—N/a	—N/a
Northampton Saints	Premiership 2008–09	9	1	—N/a	—N/a	6	7	3	3
Northampton Saints	Premiership 2009–10	20	16	7	6	—N/a	—N/a	6	1
Northampton Saints	Premiership 2010–11	12	10	7	1	—N/a	—N/a	—N/a	—N/a
Northampton Saints	Premiership 2011-12	10	6	3	1	—N/a	—N/a	1	0
Saracens	Premiership 2012-13	13	6	8	4	—N/a	—N/a	—N/a	—N/a
Saracens	Premiership 2013-14	17	8	9	11	—N/a	—N/a	—N/a	—N/a
Saracens	Premiership 2014-15	22	13	8	4	—N/a	—N/a	—N/a	—N/a
Saracens	Premiership 2015-16	14	11	8	4	—N/a	—N/a	—N/a	—N/a
Saracens	Premiership 2016-17	14	9	5	6	—N/a	—N/a	—N/a	—N/a
Toulon	Top 14 2017-18	23	24	7	2	—N/a	—N/a	—N/a	—N/a
Sale Sharks	Premiership 2018–19	7	2	—N/a	—N/a	6	8	—N/a	—N/a
Sale Sharks	Premiership 2019–20	7	4	4	1	—N/a	—N/a	3	4
Harlequins	Premiership 2019–20	6	2	—N/a	—N/a	—N/a	—N/a	—N/a	—N/a
Harlequins	Premiership 2020–21	1	0	1	0	—N/a	—N/a	—N/a	—N/a
Worcester Warriors	Premiership 2020–21	4	1	—N/a	—N/a	—N/a	—N/a	—N/a	—N/a
Leicester Tigers	Premiership 2021–22	10	6	2	1	—N/a	—N/a	—N/a	—N/a
Leicester Tigers	Premiership 2022–23	13	6	1	0	—N/a	—N/a	—N/a	—N/a
Total	—N/a	227	164	70	41	12	15	13	8

Up to dates as of 16 April 2023

== Playing style ==
Ashton's support play, which he learnt during his days as a rugby league footballer, has been praised and is often cited as the main reason that he is such a prolific try scorer. Another of Ashton's key attributes is his speed, which he demonstrated by scoring a 90-metre try against Australia in the autumn of 2010, when he outran Drew Mitchell and James O'Connor, two of Australia's fastest wingers.

When Ashton scores, he often performs a 'swallow dive', which has been nicknamed the 'Ash splash'. He has been praised and rebuked in equal measure for it, with critics concerned about the risk of dropping the ball in the act of scoring.
