= Will Matthews (rugby union) =

English rugby union player

- Born: Will Matthews; 14 January 1985 (age 41) Oxford, Oxfordshire, England
- Height: 1.88 m (6 ft 2 in)
- Weight: 106 kg (234 lb)
- School: Millfield School

Rugby union career
- Current team: London Wasps
Senior career
Years	Team	Apps	(Points)
2003–2005	Gloucester Rugby	2	(0)
2005–2008	Birmingham & Solihull R.F.C.	61	(30)
2008–2009	Blackheath F.C.	15	(10)
2009 –	London Wasps	9	(0)
International career
Years	Team	Apps	(Points)
2005	England Sevens		

Will Matthews (born 14 January 1985 in Oxford) is rugby union footballer, who plays at flanker or number eight for London Wasps. He previously played for Gloucester Rugby, Birmingham and Solihull R.F.C. and Blackheath F.C. He has also represented England Sevens, making his debut in 2005 in Singapore.

Matthews went to Millfield on a football scholarship, actually being on the books at Oxford United before taking up rugby. Spotted by an England coach doing a handling session at the school, he was promptly invited to Gloucester, where he was signed.

He posed in the 2006 Dieux du Stade calendar, organized by the Stade Français; one of only a few non-French players to do so.

Matthews trained with London Wasps during the 2008–2009 season whilst playing his 1st XV rugby at Blackheath.

In his debut season at Wasps, 2009–2010, he made 19 1st XV appearances.

During the first half of the 2010–2011 season Matthews has had to wait more patiently for first team experience, however was rewarded with starts against both Exeter Chiefs in the LV Cup in November and Newport Gwent Dragons in the Heineken Cup in late December. After recovering from injury he was handed his first Premiership start of the season versus London Irish in April.

As of May 2011 it was reported on the Wasps website that Matthews would be taking time out of the game as a result of a neck injury.
