= Marika Vakacegu =

Fijian rugby union footballer (born 1981)

- Born: Ratu Marika Toroca Vakacegu; 23 June 1981 (age 45) Suva, Fiji
- Height: 186 cm (6 ft 1 in)
- Weight: 90 kg (14 st 2 lb)

Rugby union career
- Position(s): fullback, wing
- Current team: Stade Aurillacois Cantal Auvergne
Senior career
| Years | Team | Apps | (Points) |
| 2007–08 | Birmingham and Solihull | 15 | (10) |
| 2008–09 | Cornish Pirates | 22 | (65) |
| 2009–2010 | Sale Sharks | 12 | (0) |
| 2011-2014 | Aurillac | 23 | (5) |
| 2014-2018 | Provence Rugby | 89 | (138) |
International career
| Years | Team | Apps | (Points) |
| 2004– | Fiji | | |
National sevens team
| Years | Team | | Comps |
| 2004– | Fiji Sevens | | |

Ratu Marika Toroca Vakacegu (born 23 June 1981 in Suva, Fiji) is a Fijian rugby union footballer. He plays as a wing, centre and fullback. He plays his rugby for French side Provence Rugby. He is 1.86m tall and weighs 90 kg.

He first made a name for himself playing in the Digicel Cup for Suva on the wing. He also played for the Coastal Stallions in the Colonial Cup and was the top scorer. He then made the 2004 Fiji 7's team before getting a contract with the Cornish Pirates in the National Division One. He made his debut for the Fiji team against Samoa at the National Stadium in 2004. He also made the Fiji Barbarians team for the Pacific Rugby Cup. He was recruited into the Sale Sharks team for the 2009-10 Guinness Premiership as well as the 2009-10 Heineken Cup alongside another Fijian, Sisa Koyamaibole. He signed for Aurillac in the French Pro D2 in 2011 and for Provence Rugby in 2014.
