= 2008–09 National Division Two =

English rugby union competition season

- Countries: England
- Champions: Birmingham & Solihull
- Runners-up: Cambridge
- Relegated: Waterloo, Mounts Bay, Southend, Westcombe Park
- Matches played: 181
- Attendance: 98,968 (average 547 per match)
- Highest attendance: 2,218 Redruth at home to Mounts Bay on 20 December 2008
- Lowest attendance: 131 Westcombe Park at home to Wharfedale on 29 November 2008
- Top point scorer: (England) Mark Woodrow; Birmingham & Solihull 373 points
- Top try scorer: (England) Simon Hunt; Birmingham & Solihull 31 tries

The 2008-09 National Division Two was the ninth and final version (twenty second overall) of the third division of the English rugby union league system using the name National Division Two. The RFU was planning to introduced a new professionalized format of the second division for the 2009-10 season which would lead to widespread league changes throughout the English league system including National Two being renamed National One and being increased from the 14 teams to 16 teams – a decision they made halfway through the season (more information on these changes is provided in the Divisional Changes section below). New teams to the division included Birmingham & Solihull (known the following season as Pertemps Bees) and Launceston who were relegated from the 2007–08 National Division One while promoted teams included Tynedale coming up from the 2007–08 National Division Three North while Mounts Bay (champions) and Cinderford (playoffs) both from the 2007–08 National Division Three South.

At the end of the season Birmingham & Solihull made an instant return to the (newly named) 2009-10 RFU Championship. They edged out runners up Cambridge by just 3 points due to the virtue of a superior bonus points record after both sides finished with 22 wins and 4 defeats each. At the bottom of the table Waterloo, Mounts Bay, Southend and Westcombe Park were relegated with Westcombe Park and Southend dropping to the 2009–10 National League 2 South and Waterloo falling to the 2009–10 National League 2 North. The relegation of Mounts Bay was particularly potent as it led to the club going out of business in June 2009 due to spiraling debts and an inability to cope with the increase of professionalism in the game.

== Divisional Changes ==
Halfway through the season the RFU proposed to have a total restructuring of the league system. Resulting in many changes to the division:

- The league will be increased to 16 teams
- The league will be renamed National Division One
- Only one team would be promoted instead of the usual two, to the new Guinness Championship
- Five teams would be relegated into the division instead of the usual two
- Fours teams would be promoted from National Division Three North and National Division Three South (two teams each) instead of the usual three

== Participating teams and locations ==
Locations of the 2008-09 National Division Two teams

Team	Stadium	Capacity	City/Area
Birmingham & Solihull	Sharmans Cross Road	3,500 (1,000 seats)	Solihull, West Midlands
Blackheath	Rectory Field	3,500 (500 seats)	Blackheath, London
Blaydon	Crow Trees	2,000 (400 seats)	Swalwell, Tyne and Wear
Cambridge	Grantchester Road	2,200 (200 seats)	Cambridge, Cambridgeshire
Cinderford	Dockham Road	2,500	Cinderford, Gloucestershire
Launceston	Polson Bridge	3,000	Launceston, Cornwall
Mounts Bay	Mennaye Field	3,500	Penzance, Cornwall
Redruth	Recreation Ground	3,500 (580 seats)	Redruth, Cornwall
Southend	Warners Park	1,500 (150 seats)	Southend, Essex
Stourbridge	Stourton Park	3,500 (499 seats)	Stourbridge, West Midlands
Tynedale	Tynedale Park	2,000 (400 seats)	Corbridge, Northumberland
Waterloo	St Anthony's Road	9,950 (950 seats)	Blundellsands, Merseyside
Westcombe Park	Goddington Dene	3,200 (200 seats)	Orpington, London
Wharfedale	The Avenue	2,000	Threshfield, Craven, North Yorkshire

== Final league table ==
2008–09 National Division Two table
Pos	Team	Pld	W	D	L	PF	PA	PD	B	Pts
1	Birmingham & Solihull (P)	26	22	0	4	1098	462	+636	23	111
2	Cambridge	26	22	0	4	908	434	+474	20	108
3	Redruth	26	19	1	6	752	411	+341	16	94
4	Tynedale	26	18	1	7	667	513	+154	15	89
5	Cinderford	26	16	0	10	728	598	+130	13	77
6	Blackheath	26	14	1	11	691	612	+79	13	71
7	Launceston	26	13	1	12	695	578	+117	16	70
8	Stourbridge	26	11	0	15	642	583	+59	18	62
9	Wharfedale	26	11	0	15	546	641	−95	15	59
10	Blaydon	26	9	1	16	599	609	−10	17	55
11	Westcombe Park (R)	26	9	1	16	468	746	−278	10	48
12	Southend (R)	26	5	0	21	574	797	−223	12	32
13	Mounts Bay (R)	26	6	0	20	399	844	−445	7	29 (Note: 2 points deducted?)
14	Waterloo (R)	26	4	0	22	432	1371	−939	7	23

Updated to match(es) played on 21 May 2009. Source: BBC Sport
(P) Promoted; (R) Relegated

== Results ==
=== Round 1 ===
6 September 2008

Cambridge	8 - 6	Stourbridge (BP)
	Report

Grantchester Road
Attendance: 450
Referee: Brendan Fitzmaurice

6 September 2008

Cinderford	26 - 19	Wharfedale (BP)
	Report

Dockham Road
Attendance: 400
Referee: Michael Tutty

6 September 2008

(BP) Redruth	35 - 28	Birmingham & Solihull (BP)
	Report

The Recreation Ground
Attendance: 851
Referee: Nigel Higginson

6 September 2008

(BP) Southend	23 - 30	Launceston (BP)
	Report

Warners Bridge Park
Attendance: 490
Referee: P.W Davies

6 September 2008

Tynedale	14 - 7	Mounts Bay (BP)
	Report

Tynedale Park
Attendance: 210
Referee: Paul Knowles

6 September 2008

Waterloo	8 - 46	Blaydon (BP)
	Report

St Anthony's Road
Attendance: 240
Referee: Andrew Taylorson

6 September 2008

(BP) Westcombe Park	10 - 13	Blackheath
	Report

Goddington Dene
Attendance: 531
Referee: Richard Phillips

=== Round 2 ===
13 September 2008

(BP) Birmingham & Solihull	31 - 14	Stourbridge
	Report

Sharmans Cross Road
Attendance: 770
Referee: Andrew Taylorson

13 September 2008

Blackheath	15 - 39	Southend
	Report

Rectory Field
Attendance: 520
Referee: Richard Kelly

13 September 2008

(BP) Blaydon	24 - 5	Tynedale
	Report

Crow Trees
Attendance: 752
Referee: Michael Tutty

13 September 2008

(BP) Launceston	22 - 20	Cinderford (BP)
	Report

Polson Bridge
Attendance: 799
Referee: Richard Phillips

13 September 2008

Mounts Bay	16 - 35	Redruth (BP)
	Report

Mennaye Field
Attendance: 1,500
Referee: Darren Gamage

13 September 2008

Westcombe Park	5 - 40	Cambridge (BP)
	Report

Goddington Dene
Attendance: 251
Referee: Ed Turnill

13 September 2008

Wharfedale	23 - 12	Waterloo
	Report

The Avenue
Attendance: 450
Referee: Luke Pearce

=== Round 3 ===
20 September 2008

(2BP) Cambridge	29 - 33	Birmingham & Solihull
	Report

Grantchester Road
Attendance: 840
Referee: Keith Lewis

20 September 2008

Cinderford	15 - 26	Blackheath (BP)
	Report

Dockham Road
Attendance: 350
Referee: Andrew McMenemy

20 September 2008

(BP) Redruth	38 - 12	Blaydon
	Report

The Recreation Ground
Attendance: 820
Referee: P.W Davies

20 September 2008

Southend	25 - 35	Westcombe Park (BP)
	Report

Warners Bridge Park
Attendance: 475
Referee: Paul Knowles

20 September 2008

(BP) Stourbridge	44 - 16	Mounts Bay
	Report

Stourton Park
Attendance: 500
Referee: Richard Parker-Sedgemore

20 September 2008

(BP) Tynedale	45 - 30	Wharfedale (BP)
	Report

Tynedale Park
Attendance: 320
Referee: Richard Kelly

20 September 2008

Waterloo	9 - 58	Launceston (BP)
	Report

St Anthony's Road
Attendance: 350
Referee: Brendan Fitzmaurice

=== Round 4 ===
27 September 2008

(BP) Blackheath	48 - 12	Waterloo
	Report

Rectory Field
Attendance: 695
Referee: Paul Knowles

27 September 2008

(BP) Blaydon	37 - 16	Stourbridge
	Report

Crow Trees
Attendance: 352
Referee: Darren Gamage

27 September 2008

Southend	13 - 58	Cambridge (BP)
	Report

Warners Bridge Park
Attendance: 300
Referee: Richard Phillips

27 September 2008

(BP) Launceston	29 - 27	Tynedale (BP)
	Report

Polson Bridge
Attendance: 748
Referee: Ed Turnill

27 September 2008

Mounts Bay	8 - 61	Birmingham & Solihull (BP)
	Report

Mennaye Field
Attendance: 550
Referee: Terry Hall

27 September 2008

(BP) Westcombe Park	18 - 21	Cinderford
	Report

Goddington Dene
Attendance: 224
Referee: Luke Pearce

27 September 2008

(BP) Wharfedale	15 - 18	Redruth
	Report

The Avenue
Attendance: 467
Referee: Brendan Fitzmaurice

=== Round 5 ===
4 October 2008

(BP) Birmingham & Solihull	32 - 12	Blaydon
	Report

Sharmans Cross Road
Attendance: 610
Referee: Luke Pearce

4 October 2008

(BP) Cambridge	76 - 3	Mounts Bay
	Report

Grantchester Road
Attendance: 570
Referee: Ed Turnill

4 October 2008

(BP) Cinderford	48 - 6	Southend
	Report

Dockham Road
Attendance: 240
Referee: Revis Phillips

4 October 2008

Redruth	19 - 13	Launceston (BP)
	Report

The Recreation Ground
Attendance: 2,008
Referee: Terry Hall

4 October 2008

(BP) Stourbridge	43 - 6	Wharfedale
	Report

Stourton Park
Attendance: 450
Referee: Nigel Higginson

4 October 2008

Tynedale	16 - 15	Blackheath (BP)
	Report

Tynedale Park
Attendance: 320
Referee: Brendan Fitzmaurice

4 October 2008

(BP) Waterloo	33 - 40	Westcombe Park (BP)
	Report

St Anthony's Road
Attendance: 250
Referee: Darren Gamage

=== Round 6 ===
11 October 2008

Blackheath	15 - 30	Redruth (BP)
	Report

Rectory Field
Attendance: 880
Referee: Darren Gamage

11 October 2008

(BP) Blaydon	40 - 7	Mounts Bay
	Report

Crow Trees
Attendance: 347
Referee: Andrew Vertigan

11 October 2008

(BP) Cinderford	17 - 21	Cambridge
	Report

Dockham Road
Attendance: 730
Referee: Luke Pearce

11 October 2008

(BP) Launceston	37 - 29	Stourbridge (BP)
	Report

Polson Bridge
Attendance: 782
Referee: Keith Lewis

11 October 2008

(BP) Southend	64 - 26	Waterloo (BP)
	Report

Warners Bridge Park
Attendance: 300
Referee: Ed Turnill

11 October 2008

Westcombe Park	18 - 18	Tynedale
	Report

Goddington Dene
Attendance: 225
Referee: P.W Davies

11 October 2008

(BP) Wharfedale	41 - 12	Birmingham & Solihull
	Report

The Avenue
Attendance: 520
Referee: Richard Kelly

=== Round 7 ===
18 October 2008

Birmingham & Solihull	23 - 19	Launceston (BP)
	Report

Sharmans Cross Road
Attendance: 548
Referee: Nick Williams

18 October 2008

(BP) Cambridge	39 - 28	Blaydon (BP)
	Report

Grantchester Road
Attendance: 780
Referee: Terry Hall

18 October 2008

(BP) Mounts Bay	14 - 18	Wharfedale
	Report

Mennaye Field
Attendance: 450
Referee: Nigel Higginson

18 October 2008

(BP) Redruth	44 - 10	Westcombe Park
	Report

The Recreation Ground
Attendance: 1,019
Referee: Richard Parker-Sedgmore

18 October 2008

(BP) Stourbridge	19 - 24	Blackheath
	Report

Stourton Park
Attendance: 600
Referee: Richard Phillips

18 October 2008

(BP) Tynedale	29 - 20	Southend
	Report

Tynedale Park
Attendance: 370
Referee: Trevor Fisher

18 October 2008

Waterloo	5 - 46	Cinderford (BP)
	Report

St Anthony's Road
Attendance: 352
Referee: Brendan Fitzmaurice

=== Round 8 ===
25 October 2008

(BP) Blackheath	28 - 35	Birmingham & Solihull (BP)
	Report

Rectory Field
Attendance: 827
Referee: Richard Draper

25 October 2008

Cinderford	29 - 22	Tynedale (BP)
	Report

Dockham Road
Attendance: 680
Referee: Philip Davis

25 October 2008

(BP) Launceston	6 - 8	Mounts Bay
	Report

Polson Bridge
Attendance: 1,153
Referee: Michael Tutty

25 October 2008

Southend	7 - 32	Redruth (BP)
	Report

Warners Bridge Park
Attendance: 375
Referee: Luke Pearce

25 October 2008

Waterloo	18 - 13	Cambridge (BP)
	Report

St Anthony's Road
Attendance: 252
Referee: Gary Gordon

25 October 2008

Westcombe Park	21 - 55	Stourbridge (BP)
	Report

Goddington Dene
Attendance: 250
Referee: Paul Knowles

25 October 2008

Wharfedale	15 - 14	Blaydon (BP)
	Report

The Avenue
Attendance: 421
Referee: Ed Turnill

=== Round 9 ===
1 November 2008

(BP) Birmingham & Solihull	47 - 7	Westcombe Park
	Report

Sharmans Cross Road
Attendance: 380
Referee: Mark Wilson

1 November 2008

Blaydon	18 - 16	Launceston (BP)
	Report

Crow Trees
Attendance: 410
Referee: Paul Knowles

1 November 2008

(BP) Cambridge	52 - 7	Wharfedale
	Report

Grantchester Road
Attendance: 510
Referee: Andrew Vertigan

1 November 2008

Mounts Bay	28 - 22	Blackheath (BP)
	Report

Mennaye Field
Attendance: 400
Referee: Nigel Higginson

1 November 2008

(BP) Redruth	51 - 12	Cinderford
	Report

The Recreation Ground
Attendance: 1,109
Referee: Richard Phillips

1 November 2008

Stourbridge	18 - 15	Southend (BP)
	Report

Stourton Park
Attendance: 400
Referee: Richard Kelly

1 November 2008

(BP) Tynedale	50 - 20	Waterloo
	Report

Tynedale Park
Attendance: 480
Referee: Chris Sharp

=== Round 10 ===
8 November 2008

(BP) Blackheath	25 - 14	Blaydon
	Report

Rectory Field
Attendance: 567
Referee: Michael Tutty

8 November 2008

Cinderford	20 - 12	Stourbridge
	Report

Dockham Road
Attendance: 815
Referee: Andrew Vertigan

8 November 2008

(BP) Launceston	38 - 10	Wharfedale
	Report

Polson Bridge
Attendance: 582
Referee: Richard Kelly

8 November 2008

Southend	14 - 39	Birmingham & Solihull (BP)
	Report

Warners Bridge Park
Attendance: 250
Referee: Darren Gamage

8 November 2008

(BP) Tynedale	49 - 15	Cambridge
	Report

Tynedale Park
Attendance: 330
Referee: Luke Pearce

8 November 2008

Waterloo	17 - 35	Redruth (BP)
	Report

St Anthony's Road
Attendance: 200

8 November 2008

Westcombe Park	8 - 26	Mounts Bay
	Report

Goddington Dene
Attendance: 156
Referee: Richard Phillips

=== Round 11 ===
15 November 2008

(BP) Birmingham & Solihull	53 - 3	Cinderford
	Report

Sharmans Cross Road
Attendance: 429
Referee: Paul Knowles

15 November 2008

(BP) Blaydon	35 - 22	Westcombe Park (BP)
	Report

Crow Trees
Attendance: 352
Referee: Philip Davis

15 November 2008

(BP) Cambridge	21 - 23	Launceston
	Report

Grantchester Road
Attendance: 460
Referee: Terry Hall

15 November 2008

Mounts Bay	40 - 15	Southend
	Report

Mennaye Field
Attendance: 400
Referee: Luke Pearce

15 November 2008

Redruth	15 - 5	Tynedale
	Report

The Recreation Ground
Attendance: 1,100
Referee: Ed Turnill

15 November 2008

(BP) Stourbridge	51 - 20	Waterloo
	Report

Stourton Park
Attendance: 400
Referee: Richard Draper

15 November 2008

Wharfedale	13 - 22	Blackheath
	Report

The Avenue
Attendance: 435
Referee: Mark Wilson

=== Round 12 ===
29 November 2008

(BP) Cinderford	41 - 12	Mounts Bay
	Report

Dockham Road
Attendance: 650
Referee: Richard Kelly

29 November 2008

(BP) Redruth	18 - 19	Cambridge
	Report

The Recreation Ground
Attendance: 1,089
Referee: Keith Lewis

29 November 2008

Southend	14 - 24	Blaydon
	Report

Warners Bridge Park
Attendance: 200
Referee: Brendan Fitzmaurice

29 November 2008

(BP) Tynedale	24 - 15	Stourbridge
	Report

Tynedale Park
Attendance: 360
Referee: Andrew Taylorson

29 November 2008

Waterloo	16 - 52	Birmingham & Solihull (BP)
	Report

St Anthony's Road
Attendance: 246
Referee: Luke Pearce

29 November 2008

Westcombe Park	13 - 10	Wharfedale (BP)
	Report

Goddington Dene
Attendance: 131
Referee: Richard Parker-Sedgmore

29 November 2008

Blackheath	P - P	Launceston

- Postponed. Game rescheduled to 14 April 2009.

=== Round 13 ===
6 December 2008

(BP) Birmingham & Solihull	24 - 28	Tynedale
	Report

Sharmans Cross Road
Attendance: 475
Referee: Terry Hall

6 December 2008

Cambridge	26 - 20	Blackheath (BP)
	Report

Grantchester Road
Attendance: 520
Referee: Chris Sharp

6 December 2008

(BP) Launceston	45 - 19	Westcombe Park
	Report

Polson Bridge
Attendance: 963
Referee: Richard Phillips

6 December 2008

Stourbridge	15 - 26	Redruth (BP)
	Report

Stourton Park
Attendance: 600
Referee: Michael Tutty

6 December 2008

(BP) Mounts Bay	41 - 16	Waterloo
	Report

Mennaye Field
Attendance: 350
Referee: Richard Parker-Sedgmore

6 December 2008

Blaydon	P - P	Cinderford

- Postponed. Game rescheduled to 28 February 2009.

6 December 2008

Wharfedale	P - P	Southend

- Postponed. Game rescheduled to 7 February 2009.

=== Round 14 ===
20 December 2008

Cambridge	22 - 17	Westcombe Park (BP)
	Report

Grantchester Road
Attendance: 350
Referee: Brendan Fitzmaurice

20 December 2008

(BP) Redruth	41 - 10	Mounts Bay
	Report

The Recreation Ground
Attendance: 2,218
Referee: Luke Pearce

20 December 2008

(BP) Southend	23 - 30	Blackheath
	Report

Warners Bridge Park
Attendance: 475
Referee: Richard Phillips

20 December 2008

Stourbridge	25 - 35	Birmingham & Solihull (BP)
	Report

Stourton Park
Attendance: 650
Referee: Paul Knowles

20 December 2008

Tynedale	8 - 5	Blaydon (BP)
	Report

Tynedale Park
Attendance: 810
Referee: Michael Tutty

20 December 2008

Cinderford	P - P	Launceston

- Postponed. Game rescheduled to 14 March 2009.

20 December 2008

Waterloo	P - P	Wharfedale

- Postponed. Game rescheduled to 17 January 2009.

=== Round 15 ===
3 January 2009

Blaydon	13 - 13	Redruth
	Report

Crow Trees
Attendance: 658
Referee: Andrew Taylorson

3 January 2009

(BP) Launceston	103 - 5	Waterloo
	Report

Polson Bridge
Attendance: 823
Referee: Paul Kimber

3 January 2009

(BP) Mounts Bay	9 - 14	Stourbridge
	Report

Mennaye Field
Attendance: 350
Referee: Steve Harland

3 January 2009

Blackheath	P - P	Cinderford

- Postponed. Game rescheduled to 11 April 2009.

3 January 2009

Birmingham & Solihull	P - P	Cambridge

- Postponed. Game rescheduled to 2 May 2009.

3 January 2009

Westcombe Park	P - P	Southend

- Postponed. Game rescheduled to 28 February 2009.

3 January 2009

Wharfedale	P - P	Tynedale

- Postponed. Game rescheduled to 10 April 2009.

=== Round 16 ===
10 January 2009

(BP) Tynedale	29 - 17	Launceston
	Report

Tynedale Park
Attendance: 620
Referee: Mark Wilson

10 January 2009

(BP) Redruth	14 - 15	Wharfedale
	Report

The Recreation Ground
Attendance: 951
Referee: Michael Tutty

10 January 2009

Birmingham & Solihull	P - P	Mounts Bay

- Postponed. Game rescheduled to 14 March 2009.

10 January 2009

Cambridge	P - P	Southend

- Postponed. Game rescheduled to 14 March 2009.

10 January 2009

Cinderford	P - P	Westcombe Park

- Postponed. Game rescheduled to 2 May 2009.

10 January 2009

Stourbridge	P - P	Blaydon

- Postponed. Game rescheduled to 2 May 2009.

10 January 2009

Waterloo	P - P	Blackheath

- Postponed. Game rescheduled to 28 February 2009.

=== Round 14 (Rescheduled game) ===
17 January 2009

(BP) Waterloo	27 - 42	Wharfedale (BP)
	Report

St Anthony's Road
Attendance: 356
Referee: Richard Parker-Sedgmore

- Game rescheduled from 20 December 2008.

=== Round 17 ===
24 January 2009

Blackheath	28 - 3	Tynedale
	Report

Rectory Field
Attendance: 850
Referee: Luke Pearce

24 January 2009

Blaydon	15 - 31	Birmingham & Solihull
	Report

Crow Trees
Attendance: 417
Referee: Andrew McMenemy

24 January 2009

Launceston	19 - 8	Redruth
	Report

Polson Bridge
Attendance: 1,911
Referee: Keith Lewis

24 January 2009

Mounts Bay	3 - 28	Cambridge (BP)
	Report

Mennaye Field
Attendance: 250
Referee: Philip Davis

24 January 2009

(BP) Southend	20 - 21	Cinderford
	Report

Warners Bridge Park
Attendance: 495
Referee: Brendan Fitzmaurice

24 January 2009

(BP) Westcombe Park	22 - 7	Waterloo
	Report

Goddington Dene
Attendance: 209
Referee: Ed Turnill

24 January 2009

(BP) Wharfedale	20 - 26	Stourbridge
	Report

The Avenue
Attendance: 436
Referee: Ross Campbell

=== Round 18 ===
31 January 2009

(BP) Birmingham & Solihull	55 - 13	Wharfedale
	Report

Sharmans Cross Road
Attendance: 497
Referee: Stefano Roscini

31 January 2009

(BP) Cambridge	27 - 3	Cinderford
	Report

Grantchester Road
Attendance: 570
Referee: Llyr Apgeraint-Roberts

31 January 2009

Mounts Bay	12 - 0	Blaydon
	Report

Mennaye Field
Attendance: 250
Referee: Richard Parker-Sedgmore

31 January 2009

(BP) Redruth	29 - 17	Blackheath
	Report

The Recreation Ground
Attendance: 867
Referee: Richard Phillips

31 January 2009

(BP) Stourbridge	37 - 36	Launceston (2BP)
	Report

Stourton Park
Attendance: 450
Referee: Ed Turnill

31 January 2009

(BP) Tynedale	36 - 14	Westcombe Park
	Report

Tynedale Park
Attendance: 460
Referee: Chris Sharp

31 January 2009

(BP) Waterloo	27 - 26	Southend (BP)
	Report

St Anthony's Road
Attendance: 250
Referee: Andrew Taylorson

=== Round 13 (Rescheduled game) ===
7 February 2009

(BP) Wharfedale	32 - 12	Southend
	Report

The Avenue
Attendance: 470
Referee: Mark Wilson

- Game rescheduled from 6 December 2008.

=== Round 19 ===
14 February 2009

Blackheath	23 - 17	Stourbridge (BP)
	Report

Rectory Field
Attendance: 463
Referee: Luke Pearce

14 February 2009

Southend	12 - 28	Tynedale (BP)
	Report

Warners Bridge Park
Attendance: 230
Referee: Richard Parker-Sedgmore

14 February 2009

(BP) Westcombe Park	13 - 15	Redruth
	Report

Goddington Dene
Attendance: 200
Referee: Philip Davis

14 February 2009

(BP) Wharfedale	28 - 16	Mounts Bay
	Report

The Avenue
Attendance: 420
Referee: Andrew Vertigan

14 February 2009

Blaydon	P - P	Cambridge

- Postponed. Game rescheduled to 11 April 2009.

14 February 2009

Cinderford	P - P	Waterloo

- Postponed. Game rescheduled to 9 May 2009.

14 February 2009

Launceston	P - P	Birmingham & Solihull

- Postponed. Game rescheduled to 11 April 2009.

=== Round 20 ===
21 February 2009

(BP) Birmingham & Solihull	58 - 12	Blackheath
	Report

Sharmans Cross Road
Attendance: 748
Referee: Richard Phillips

21 February 2009

(BP) Blaydon	27 - 35	Wharfedale (BP)
	Report

Crow Trees
Attendance: 466
Referee: Trevor Fisher

21 February 2009

(BP) Cambridge	91 - 0	Waterloo
	Report

Grantchester Road
Attendance: 650
Referee: Ed Turnill

21 February 2009

(BP) Mounts Bay	15 - 19	Launceston
	Report

Mennaye Field
Attendance: 1,100
Referee: Nick Williams

21 February 2009

(BP) Redruth	48 - 14	Southend
	Report

The Recreation Ground
Attendance: 1,070
Referee: Steve Lee

21 February 2009

(BP) Stourbridge	36 - 14	Westcombe Park
	Report

Stourton Park
Attendance: 450
Referee: Richard Kelly

21 February 2009

(BP) Tynedale	31 - 10	Cinderford
	Report

Tynedale Park
Attendance: 420
Referee: Andrew Vertigan

=== Rounds 13, 15 & 16 (Rescheduled games) ===
28 February 2009

(BP) Blaydon	7 - 14	Cinderford
	Report

Crow Trees
Attendance: 210
Referee: Brendan Fitzmaurice

- Game rescheduled from 6 December 2008.

28 February 2009

(BP) Waterloo	24 - 85	Blackheath (BP)
	Report

St Anthony's Road
Attendance: 174
Referee: Andrew Vertigan

- Game rescheduled from 10 January 2009.

28 February 2009

Westcombe Park	28 - 21	Southend (BP)
	Report

Goddington Dene
Attendance: 185
Referee: Ed Turnill

- Game rescheduled from 3 January 2009.

=== Round 21 ===
7 March 2009

(BP) Blackheath	55 - 21	Mounts Bay
	Report

Rectory Field
Attendance: 632
Referee: David Walker

7 March 2009

(BP) Cinderford	20 - 25	Redruth
	Report

Dockham Road
Attendance: 770
Referee: Paul Knowles

7 March 2009

Launceston	23 - 19	Blaydon (BP)
	Report

Polson Bridge
Attendance: 910
Referee: Nick Williams

7 March 2009

(BP) Southend	23 - 24	Stourbridge (BP)
	Report

Warners Bridge Park
Attendance: 375
Referee: Terry Hall

7 March 2009

Waterloo	14 - 38	Tynedale (BP)
	Report

St Anthony's Road
Attendance: 200
Referee: Ross Campbell

7 March 2009

Westcombe Park	11 - 29	Birmingham & Solihull (BP)
	Report

Goddington Dene
Attendance: 213
Referee: Rowan Kitt

7 March 2009

Wharfedale	14 - 35	Cambridge (BP)
	Report

The Avenue
Attendance: 523
Referee: Philip Davis

=== Rounds 14 & 16 (Rescheduled games) ===
14 March 2009

(BP) Birmingham & Solihull	80 - 5	Mounts Bay
	Report

Sharmans Cross Road
Attendance: 314
Referee: Ross Campbell

- Game rescheduled from 10 January 2009.

14 March 2009

(BP) Cambridge	31 - 22	Southend
	Report

Grantchester Road
Attendance: 420
Referee: Steve Lee

- Game rescheduled from 10 January 2009.

14 March 2009

(BP) Cinderford	46 - 15	Launceston
	Report

Dockham Road
Attendance: 540
Referee: Richard Phillips

- Game rescheduled from 20 December 2008.

=== Round 22 ===
21 March 2009

(BP) Birmingham & Solihull	49 - 27	Southend (BP)
	Report

Sharmans Cross Road
Attendance: 407
Referee: Richard Parker-Sedgemore

21 March 2009

(BP) Blaydon	27 - 13	Blackheath
	Report

Crow Trees
Attendance: 205
Referee: Steve Lee

21 March 2009

(BP) Cambridge	32 - 18	Tynedale
	Report

Grantchester Road
Attendance: 480
Referee: Richard Phillips

21 March 2009

Mounts Bay	14 - 40	Westcombe Park (BP)
	Report

Mennaye Field
Attendance: 153
Referee: Luke Pearce

21 March 2009

(BP) Redruth	96 - 5	Waterloo
	Report

The Recreation Ground
Attendance: 952
Referee: Simon McConnell

21 March 2009

(2BP) Stourbridge	31 - 37	Cinderford (BP)
	Report

Stourton Park
Attendance: 450
Referee: Philip Davis

21 March 2009

(BP) Wharfedale	26 - 24	Launceston (BP)
	Report

The Avenue
Attendance: 386
Referee: Richard Kelly

=== Round 23 ===
28 March 2009

Blackheath	19 - 15	Wharfedale (BP)
	Report

Rectory Field
Attendance: 610
Referee: Paul Knowles

28 March 2009

Cinderford	10 - 36	Birmingham & Solihull (BP)
	Report

Dockham Road
Attendance: 410
Referee: Darren Gamage

28 March 2009

Launceston	0 - 24	Cambridge (BP)
	Report

Polson Bridge
Attendance: 804
Referee: Michael Tutty

28 March 2009

(BP) Tynedale	35 - 24	Redruth
	Report

Tynedale Park
Attendance: 636

28 March 2009

Southend	20 - 0 (Note: Southend awarded 20 - 0 win as Mounts Bay were unable to contest game due to injuries preventing them from fielding a full front row.)	Mounts Bay

28 March 2009

Waterloo	10 - 5	Stourbridge (BP)
	Report

St Anthony's Road
Attendance: 254
Referee: Brendan Fitzmaurice

28 March 2009

Westcombe Park	12 - 10	Blaydon (BP)
	Report

Goddington Dene
Attendance: 208
Referee: Steve Lee

=== Round 24 ===
4 April 2009

(BP) Birmingham & Solihull	115 - 0	Waterloo
	Report

Sharmans Cross Road
Attendance: 447
Referee: Steve Lee

4 April 2009

Blaydon	28 - 43	Southend (BP)
	Report

Crow Trees
Attendance: 220
Referee: Brendan Fitzmaurice

4 April 2009

Cambridge	21 - 18	Redruth (BP)
	Report

Grantchester Road
Attendance: 1,380
Referee: Andrew Taylorson

4 April 2009

Launceston	18 - 18	Blackheath
	Report

Polson Bridge
Attendance: 722
Referee: Richard Phillips

4 April 2009

(BP) Mounts Bay	26 - 45	Cinderford (BP)
	Report

Mennaye Field
Attendance: 289
Referee: Nick Williams

4 April 2009

(2BP) Stourbridge	27 - 31	Tynedale (BP)
	Report

Stourton Park
Attendance: 300
Referee: David Walker

4 April 2009

(BP) Wharfedale	13 - 18	Westcombe Park
	Report

The Avenue
Attendance: 368
Referee: Trevor Fisher

=== Rounds 15 & 19 (Rescheduled games) ===
10 April 2009

Launceston	16 - 35	Birmingham & Solihull (BP)
	Report

Polson Bridge
Attendance: 882
Referee: Richard Phillips

- Game rescheduled from 14 February 2009.

10 April 2009

(BP) Wharfedale	10 - 14	Tynedale
	Report

The Avenue
Attendance: 487
Referee: Mark Wilson

- Game rescheduled from 3 January 2009.

11 April 2009

(BP) Blackheath	14 - 41	Cinderford (BP)
	Report

Rectory Field
Attendance: 445
Referee: Richard Kelly

- Game rescheduled from 3 January 2009.

11 April 2009

(BP) Blaydon	24 - 54	Cambridge (BP)
	Report

Crow Trees
Attendance: 296
Referee: Andrew Vertigan

- Game rescheduled from 14 February 2009.

=== Round 12 (Rescheduled game) ===
14 April 2009

(BP) Blackheath	33 - 17	Launceston
	Report

Rectory Field
Attendance: 363
Referee: Philip Davis

- Game rescheduled from 29 November 2008.

=== Round 25 ===
18 April 2009

(2BP) Blackheath	41 - 43	Cambridge (BP)
	Report

Rectory Field
Attendance: 814
Referee: Andrew Vertigan

18 April 2009

Redruth	18 - 14	Stourbridge (BP)
	Report

The Recreation Ground
Attendance: 1,158
Referee: Nick Williams

18 April 2009

(BP) Cinderford	35 - 30	Blaydon (2BP)
	Report

Dockham Road
Attendance: 390
Referee: Ross Campbell

18 April 2009

Southend	33 - 24	Wharfedale
	Report

Warners Bridge Park
Attendance: 450
Referee: Ed Turnill

18 April 2009

Tynedale	22 - 45	Birmingham & Solihull (BP)
	Report

Tynedale Park
Attendance: 710
Referee: Andrew Taylorson

18 April 2009

(BP) Waterloo	51 - 31	Mounts Bay (BP)
	Report

St Anthony's Road
Attendance: 450
Referee: John Meredith

18 April 2009

(BP) Westcombe Park	34 - 19	Launceston
	Report

Goddington Dene
Attendance: 252
Referee: Richard Phillips

=== Round 26 ===
25 April 2009

(BP) Birmingham & Solihull	31 - 7	Redruth
	Report

Sharmans Cross Road
Attendance: 1,177
Referee: Chris Sharp

25 April 2009

(BP) Blackheath	30 - 19	Westcombe Park
	Report

Rectory Field
Attendance: 1,498
Referee: Rowan Kitt

25 April 2009

(BP) Blaydon	83 - 33	Waterloo (BP)
	Report

Crow Trees
Attendance: 520
Referee: Steve Lee

25 April 2009

(BP) Launceston	33 - 23	Southend
	Report

Polson Bridge
Attendance: 667
Referee: John Meredith

25 April 2009

Mounts Bay	14 - 32	Tynedale (BP)
	Report

Mennaye Field
Attendance: 136
Referee: Nick Williams

25 April 2009

Stourbridge	5 - 38	Cambridge (BP)
	Report

Stourton Park
Attendance: 550
Referee: Terry Hall

25 April 2009

(BP) Wharfedale	52 - 14	Cinderford
	Report

The Avenue
Attendance: 598
Referee: Richard Kelly

=== Rounds 15 & 16 (Rescheduled games) ===
2 May 2009

(BP) Birmingham & Solihull	29 - 45	Cambridge (BP)
	Report

Sharmans Cross Road
Attendance: 720
Referee: Chris Sharp

- Game rescheduled from 3 January 2009.

2 May 2009

(BP) Cinderford	72 - 0	Westcombe Park
	Report

Dockham Road
Attendance: 375
Referee: Steve Lee

- Game rescheduled from 10 January 2009.

2 May 2009

(BP) Stourbridge	46 - 7	Blaydon
	Report

Stourton Park
Attendance: 350
Referee: John Meredith

- Game rescheduled from 10 January 2009.

=== Round 19 (Rescheduled game) ===
9 May 2009

(BP) Cinderford	67 - 17	Waterloo
	Report

Dockham Road
Attendance: 410
Referee: Marcus Caton

- Game rescheduled from 14 February 2009.

== Total season attendances ==
Club	Home Games	Total	Average	Highest	Lowest	% Capacity
Birmingham & Solihull	13	7,522	579	1,177	314	17%
Blackheath	13	9,164	705	1,498	363	20%
Blaydon	13	5,205	400	752	205	20%
Cambridge	13	7,980	614	1,380	350	28%
Cinderford	13	6,760	520	815	240	21%
Launceston	13	11,746	904	1,911	582	30%
Mounts Bay	13	6,178	475	1,500	136	14%
Redruth	13	15,212	1,170	2,218	820	33%
Southend	12 (Note: Southend only played 12 home games due to Mounts Bay pulling out of the fixture due to be held at Warners Park on 28 March 2009.)	4,415	368	495	200	25%
Stourbridge	13	6,150	473	650	300	14%
Tynedale	13	6,046	465	810	210	23%
Waterloo	13	3,574	275	450	174	3%
Westcombe Park	13	3,035	233	531	131	7%
Wharfedale	13	5,981	460	598	368	23%

== Individual statistics ==
- Note if players are tied on tries or points the player with the lowest number of appearances will come first. Also note that points scorers includes tries as well as conversions, penalties and drop goals.

=== Top points scorers ===
Rank	Player	Team	Appearances	Points
1	(England) Mark Woodrow	Birmingham & Solihull	25	373
2	(England) Alastair Bressington	Stourbridge	23	250
3	(England) Mark Bedworth	Wharfedale	24	246
4	(England) Daniel Hawkes	Mounts Bay	23	197
5	(England) Ben Patston	Cambridge	23	183
6	(England) Adam Staniforth	Launceston	25	169
7	(England) Andy Frost	Southend	14	161
7	(England) Mark Scrivener	Redruth	19	161
8	(England) Simon Hunt	Birmingham & Solihull	26	155
9	(England) Matthew Leek	Blackheath	24	152

=== Top try scorers ===
Rank	Player	Team	Appearances	Tries
1	(England) Simon Hunt	Birmingham & Solihull	26	31
2	(England) Luke Fielden	Cambridge	22	24
3	(Wales) Andrew Fenby	Blaydon	18	18
3	(England) Rob Thirlby	Redruth	25	18
4	(South Africa) Christoff Lombaard	Cambridge	26	17
5	(England) Rob Connolly	Birmingham & Solihull	26	15
5	(England) Reece Spee	Birmingham & Solihull	26	15
6	(England) Jack Harrison	Tynedale	26	14
7	(Australia) Rod Petty	Birmingham & Solihull	25	13
8	(South Africa) Chris Malherbe	Wharfedale	19	12

== Season records ==
=== Team ===
Largest home win — 115 pts

115 - 0 Birmingham & Solihull at home to Waterloo on 4 April 2009

Largest away win — 61 pts

85 - 24 Blackheath away to Waterloo on 28 February 2009

Most points scored — 115 pts

115 - 0 Birmingham & Solihull at home to Waterloo on 4 April 2009

Most tries in a match — 17

115 - 0 Birmingham & Solihull at home to Waterloo on 4 April 2009

Most conversions in a match — 15

115 - 0 Birmingham & Solihull at home to Waterloo on 4 April 2009

Most penalties in a match — 7

Mounts Bay at home to Southend on 5 November 2008

Most drop goals in a match — 1

N/A - multiple teams

=== Player ===
Most points in a match — 35 (x2)

(England) Alastair Bressington for Stourbridge away to Westcombe Park on 25 October 2008
(England) Mark Woodrow for Birmingham & Solihull at home to Waterloo on 4 April 2009

Most tries in a match — 5

(Wales) Emyr Lewis for Redruth at home to Waterloo on 21 March 2009

Most conversions in a match — 15

(England) Mark Woodrow for Birmingham & Solihull at home to Waterloo on 4 April 2009

Most penalties in a match — 7

(England) Daniel Hawkes for Mounts Bay at home to Southend on 5 November 2008

Most drop goals in a match — 1

N/A - multiple players

=== Attendances ===
Highest — 2,218

Redruth at home to Mounts Bay on 20 December 2008

Lowest — 131

Westcombe Park at home to Wharfedale on 29 November 2008

Highest Average Attendance — 1,170

Redruth

Lowest Average Attendance — 233

Westcombe Park

== See also ==
- English Rugby Union Leagues
- English rugby union system
- Rugby union in England
