= Birmingham & Solihull R.F.C. =

English rugby union club, based in Birmingham

Birmingham & Solihull
- Full name: Birmingham & Solihull Rugby Football Club Ltd
- Union: North Midlands RFU
- Nickname: Bees
- Founded: 2009; 17 years ago
- Location: Portway, West Midlands, England
- Ground: Portway (Capacity: 4,000)
- Coach: George Littlechild
- League: Counties 2 Midlands West (South)
- 2022–23: Promoted from Midlands 5 West (South) (1st)
Team kit

Official website
- www.beesrugby.com

Birmingham & Solihull Rugby Football Club is an English rugby union club based in Portway, Birmingham.

There have been three rugby clubs, each one a separate legal entity, that have borne the "Birmingham & Solihull" name:

- Birmingham & Solihull Rugby Football Club Ltd ('the first club'), founded in 1989 -as an industrial and provident society- upon the merger of two clubs, Birmingham RFC and Solihull RFC. The club was liquidated following severe financial difficulties experienced during the 2009/10 season when it was playing in the Championship (level 2).
- Birmingham & Solihull Rugby Club Limited ('the second club'), incorporated on 22 October 2009 -as a private limited company- to take over the playing activities of Birmingham & Solihull Rugby Football Club Ltd. Its last season was 2018/19 when it finished 14th out of 16 in National League 2 (South) (level 4).
- Birmingham & Solihull Rugby Football Club Ltd (i.e. same name as the first club) ('the third club'), incorporated on 9 May 2018 -as a company limited by guarantee- in anticipation of Birmingham & Solihull Rugby Club Limited ceasing operating at the end of the 2018/19 season. The club debuted in the Greater Birmingham Merit League in the 2019/20 season. For the 202/23 season the club is playing in Counties 3 Midlands West (South) (level 9).

== History ==
=== Origins ===
The club to bear the 'Birmingham & Solihull' name was a merger of Birmingham RFC and Solihull RFC.

Birmingham RFC was founded in 1909.

Birmingham RFC was seeded in Courage National Division Three with Exeter, Fylde, Maidstone, Met Police, Morley, Nuneaton, Plymouth Albion, Sheffield, Vale of Lune, Wakefield and West Hartlepool, when league rugby started in 1987/88.

At the end of the first season it was relegated, together with Morley. A second successive relegation followed in 1988/89 after all ten games in Area League North were lost.

Birmingham's ground at the time of its merger with Solihull RFC was at Forshaw Heath Lane, Portway and is where the third club currently plays.

Solihull RFC was founded in 1933. Solihull, also an independent club, found difficulty in adjusting to the demands of league rugby too. Seeded in Area League North the club lost all ten games in 1987/88 and having been relegated to Midlands Division One, finished ninth from twelve the following season. Solihull's ground at the time of its merger with Birmingham RFC was at Sharmans Cross Road, Solihull.

Nickname

After the first Birmingham & Solihull Rugby Football Club Ltd was founded it was given the nickname the 'Bees', it is reputed by a local journalist in a match report, and became widely adopted. In 2001 the club underwent a large scale rebranding, adopting the alias Pertemps Bees for league and marketing purposes, following a five-year sponsorship deal with the Pertemps Group (an employment agency). However, the official name of the club remained unchanged during the (prematurely terminated) sponsorship period and 'Bees' has never appeared in any of the three Birmingham & Solihull clubs' official names, although the nickname has persisted & was / is used by the two successor clubs, their supporters etc.

Notable events

The club is remembered by many fans for their cup success of 2004, in which they caused a significant upset by beating London Wasps 28–24 in the quarter-final of the Powergen Cup overcoming odds of 250–1; they subsequently played Newcastle Falcons in the semi-final, live on BBC television. The club however hit rock bottom just two seasons later in 2005–06 when they finished last in National Division One but were saved from relegation because of league expansion.

In October 2006 it was announced that Bees were in the planning stage of building a £60 million super stadium at their training ground known as Portway just off Junction 3 of the M42 near Solihull. It would be one of the nation's largest sports villages to rival anything built for the 2012 Olympics. Plans included a regional sports academy, education and conference centre, 12,000 capacity stadium, seven all-weather rugby pitches, archery and shooting ranges and a watersports lake. However, this project came to nothing.

In June 2007 the club's coach Steve Williams left with one year still left on his contract to become assistant manager at Magners League side Ulster. Williams, a former Northampton and London Irish player, won 29 caps for Wales.

The 2007–08 season began under a split coaching structure in which two former England Sevens internationals had equal control over the squad. Ben Harvey coached the backs and Russell Earnshaw was player/forwards coach. The coaching structure however was widely viewed as unsuccessful and former Bees scrum-half Harvey was sacked shortly before Christmas. On a temporary basis former Rotherham head coach Andre Bester was appointed to take charge of the side before being replaced by former Wales A coach Allan Lewis.

In November 2007 it was announced that Bees would sell their Sharmans Cross Road pitch and play at local football side Solihull Moors Damson Park as part of a ground share arrangement. However, while the second club did later spend two seasons at Damson Park, this particular arrangement was never fulfilled with the first club continuing to play at Sharmans Cross Road until its demise.

On 28 January former Llanelli centre Allan Lewis was announced as the head coach. Lewis brought experience to the club after previously holding the role of head coach at Celtic Warriors, Moseley, Newport and Bridgend. Lewis had also worked with the Welsh national squad working as selector, backs coach and Wales A head coach at different times throughout his career. However, by 17 April it was reported that Lewis would not remain at the club past the 2007–08 season and would return to his post at Hartpury College.

The Bees were relegated to National Division Two at the end of the 2007–08 season finishing in 15th position. Following their relegation they would also end the clubs association with the Pertemps Group losing the moniker of 'Pertemps Bees' and changing back to using the club's official name.

Birmingham & Solihull finished the 2008–09 season as winners of National Division Two and were promoted to the newly formed Championship. Fly half Mark Woodrow finished as top point scorer within the National Leagues and winger Simon Hunt as top try scorer.

== Sharmans Cross Road ==
Sharmans Cross Road was the Bees' main ground until the end of the 2009/10 season. They owned the freehold of the car park & leased the remaining land from Solihull Metropolitan Borough Council. The ground is named after the road it lies off in Solihull, West Midlands. However, the Bees were obliged to give up the ground following the first club's financial difficulties in the 2009/10 season.

A stand was purchased from Worcester Warriors in 2005. Then, in Summer 2010, the Bees (in the form of the second club) left Sharmans Cross Road and moved to local football side Solihull Moors F.C. Damson Park in a ground share arrangement which lasted for two seasons. The Sharmans Cross Road ground is currently unused.

In 2014 the former clubhouse at the ground was damaged by fire.

== Portway Stadium ==
In October 2006 plans were revealed to Bees members for a new multi-purpose £60 million stadium to be built at Birmingham & Solihull R.F.C.'s training ground at Portway. However progress stalled due to Portway being under the jurisdiction of Stratford District Council whereas the Bees are a Birmingham & Solihull club.

=== A new beginning ===
Bees' campaign in the 2009–10 season was blighted by administration. Bees finished the main season on negative points, at the bottom of the table. However a mini-league of the bottom four teams was played to decide relegation. Unfortunately, due to an administration error back in January, Bees started the play-off league on −2 points. Yet despite the Bees were able to retain their position in the league and avoid relegation

However, their stay in English rugby union's second tier was not confirmed until 26 May 2010, when the RFU published a Press Release confirming that the second club had passed an audit of their finances and business plan – and were accepted as full members of the union.

For the 2012–13 season the Bees moved to what had formerly been their training ground, Portway.

== Modern Era ==
Following the 2018–19 season, the club (then operating as Birmingham & Solihull Rugby Club Limited) ceased its playing activities at level 4 and reformed under a new legal entity, again using the name Birmingham & Solihull Rugby Football Club Ltd. The club began competing at lower levels, entering the Greater Birmingham Merit League for the 2019–20 season.

Over subsequent seasons the Bees worked their way back up the league structure. They won the Midlands 5 West (South) title in 2021–22, and followed this by winning Counties 3 Midlands West (South) in 2022–23.

In 2024 the club appointed George Littlechild as Head Coach of the senior squad. Under his leadership, the team has sought to rebuild its competitiveness while retaining its amateur ethos. In the 2024–25 season they achieved their highest league finish since reforming, finishing fourth in Counties 2 Midlands West (East) after a strong run of wins and a late-season surge.

== Honours ==
- Midlands Premier champions: 1992–93, 2017–18
- North Midlands Cup winners (2): 1992–93, 2015–16
- Jewson National League 2 North champions: 1997–98
- National League Two champions: 2008–09
- Midlands 5 west (south) champions 2021–22

Counties 3 Midlands west (south) Champions 2022–23

- North midlands vase champions 2021–22

== Full internationals ==
- (Tonga) Hotili Asi
- (England) Tom Beim
- (Scotland) Craig Chalmers
- (Ireland) Tom Court
- (Canada) Casey Dunning
- (England) Rob Hardwick
- (Tonga) Aisea Havili
- (Canada) Brodie Henderson & Sevens
- (Namibia) Uakazuwaka Kazombiaze
- (Tonga) Hesse Fakatou
- (Tonga) Leo Halavatau
- (England) Mark Linnett
- (Tonga) Rodney Mahe
- (Fiji) Akapusi Qera
- (Cook Islands) Tu Tamarua & Pacific Islanders
- (Canada) Kevin Tkachuk
- (Fiji) Marika Vakacegu & Sevens
- (Scotland) Alex Grove
- (Wales) Tal Selley
- (Sweden) Andrew Daish & Sevens
- (Germany) Dale Garner

== Sevens ==
- (England) Nick Baxter – Sevens, Barbarians
- (Wales) Andrew Daish – U18 Youth, U18 Schools, U19
  (Sweden) – Sevens
- (England) Russell Earnshaw – Sevens
- (The Bahamas) Geoff Gregory – Sevens
- (England) Simon Hunt – Sevens
- (England) Ben Harvey – Sevens
- (England) Jim Jenner – Sevens and GB Sevens
- (England) Will Matthews – Sevens, Younger Sevens
- (Fiji) Luke Nabaro – U21s, A, Sevens
- (England) Uche Odouza – U18, 19, 21, Sevens
- (Australia) Rod Petty – Sevens, U19, U21
- (Australia) Tim Walsh – Sevens
- (New Zealand) Aaron Takarangi – Sevens

== Other representative teams ==
- (England) Miles Benjamin – U19, National Academy
- (Wales) Alex Davidson – U21 & Students & England Counties
- (Wales) Tristan Davies – U21s
- (England) Ryan Lamb
- (England) Ben Harvey – Sevens
- (Wales) Mike Hook – U21s
- (England) Alan Hubbleday – U21s & Students
- (England) Dave Knight – Counties
- (England) Paul Knight – Counties
- (Wales) Matt Larsen – U20's
- (England) Matt Long – Students
- (Ireland) Brendan Lynch – U19
- (England) Simon Martin – U21s
- (England) Rob Merritt – Colts
- (Wales) Matthew Nuthall – U18, 19, 21s
- (England) Ed Orgee – Students
- (England) Kyle Palm – Students
- (England) Scott Read – U21s
- (Wales) Jason Strange – Squad
- (England) Jim Thorp – U21s
- (England) Shaun Woof – U21s
- (England) Mark Cornwell
- (England) Andy Gravil – U18, 19s
