= Wasps RFC =

Former English rugby union club, based in Coventry, England

Coordinates: 52°26′53″N 1°29′44″W

(England) Wasps
- Full name: Wasps Rugby Football Club
- Founded: 1866; 160 years ago (as "Hampstead Football Club" ) 1867; 159 years ago (as "Wasps FC")
- Disbanded: 2022; 4 years ago
- Location: Sudbury, London
- Chairman: Christopher Holland
- CEO: Vacant
- Most appearances: Simon Shaw (355)
- Top scorer: Jimmy Gopperth (1,152)
- Most tries: Christian Wade (82)
- League: tbc
- 2022–23: Premiership (Relegated due to administration)
1st kit	2nd kit

Official website
- www.wasps.co.uk

Wasps Rugby Football Club was a professional rugby union team. They last played in Premiership Rugby, the top division of English rugby, until being suspended on 12 October 2022. On 17 October 2022, the club entered administration, resulting in relegation from the league and all staff being made redundant. They exited administration on 16 December 2022, but the club is still officially defunct as of 2026.

Founded in 1867 as Wasps Football Club, from 1923 to 1996 they were based at Repton Avenue in Sudbury, London. From 1996 to 2002 the team played at Loftus Road in Shepherd's Bush, London and from 2002 to 2014 they played at Adams Park in High Wycombe, Buckinghamshire. From 2014 to 2022 their home ground was the Coventry Building Society Arena (known until 2021 as the Ricoh Arena) in Coventry.

Wasps won 12 major titles. They were European Champions twice, in 2004 and 2007; won six English Championships including three in a row from 2003 to 2005; and won three Anglo-Welsh Cups. They also won the 2003 European Rugby Challenge Cup. Wasps most recent trophy was the 2007–08 Premiership.

In 2021–22 Premiership Rugby, their last completed season, Wasps finished 9th. Lee Blackett was appointed head coach in February 2020, until being made redundant.

In October 2023, the owners of the club announced plans to revive the team in a permanent home in Kent, while maintaining the possibility of playing from Sixways Stadium in Worcester pending completion of any new build. The club stated that it hoped to be involved in the relaunch of the professional game in England from 2025.

== History ==
=== Wasps FC: 1866–1995 ===
Hampstead Football Club was founded in 1866. A split in the membership resulted in the formation of two different clubs: Harlequin F.C. and Wasps. Wasps Football Club was itself formed in 1867 at the now defunct Eton and Middlesex Tavern in North London; names of insects, birds and other animals were considered fashionable in the Victorian period. In December 1870, Edwin Ash, Secretary of Richmond Football Club published a letter in the papers which said, "Those who play the rugby-type game should meet to form a code of practice as various clubs play to rules which differ from others, which makes the game difficult to play."

As a reasonably well-established club, the Wasps were eligible to be founder members of the Rugby Football Union (RFU). On 26 January 1871 the meeting was scheduled to take place. However a mix-up led to them sending their representative to the wrong venue at the wrong time on the wrong day. Another version of the story was that he went to a pub of the same name and after consuming a number of drinks was too drunk to make it to the correct address after he realised his mistake. Wasps were, therefore, not present at the inauguration ceremony and thus forfeited their right to be called foundation members.

Wasps' first home was in Finchley Road, North London. Later, grounds were rented in various parts of London until in 1923 the Wasps found a permanent home at Sudbury, Middlesex, eventually buying the ground outright. The side had somewhat of a renaissance during the 1930s; in the earlier part of the decade they were seen as one of the better English clubs, going unbeaten in the 1930/31 English season. The 1930s also saw the emergence of Neville Compton, who captained the side between 1939 and 1947 and went on to become fixture secretary in 1959 and eventually became the club president in the early 1970s before retiring in 1988.

Wasps went on to host Welsh internationals Vivian Jenkins and Harry Bowcott, in addition to this national representation, numerous Wasps came to play for the England national side, such as Ted Woodward, Bob Stirling, Richard Sharp and Don Rutherford. In 1967, the Wasps club celebrated their centenary. Celebrations took the form of two matches that were held at the Rugby school grounds, where William Webb Ellis is thought to have originated the rugby union game. One match was played against the Barbarian F.C., the other, against another London rugby union club, the Harlequins.

In 1986, Wasps Football Club made their first appearance at the final of the John Player Cup knock-out competition, which originated in 1972. Wasps were defeated by Bath in a close game, where Bath emerged as winners, 25 points to 17. The following year Wasps continued their success in the knock-out competition and they again met Bath in the final. They were however again defeated by Bath in a close game, Bath winning 19 points to 12. Wasp Rob Andrew captained England against Romania in 1989. In 1990, Andrew captained Wasps to their first Courage League title, as they narrowly pipped Orrell R.U.F.C. to be English champions.

In 1995 Wasps lost 16–36 to Bath in the final of the Pilkington Cup. It was their first appearance in the final since 1987 and 1986, when their opponents – and the eventual winners – on both occasions were also Bath.

After winning the title, Wasps regularly finished in the top three of the Courage league title, although they were never quite good enough to overcome Bath, the pre-eminent club of the time. Then in 1995–96, with many pundits predicting Wasps could make a run for the title, Rob Andrew took up a lucrative deal to become Player Manager of Newcastle Falcons. He recruited several other leading Wasps, including, most notably, Club Captain Dean Ryan. For a few weeks Wasps looked like becoming the first casualty of the professional era as the backbone of their team had left. But under newly appointed captain Lawrence Dallaglio, the club steadied the ship, and managed to finish fourth, and secure a place in the following season's Heineken Cup, which English teams were entering for the first time.

=== Wasps RFC: 1996–1999 ===
The original Wasps logo used until 1999

The following season, 1996–97, Wasps won their second league championship, and became the first English Champions of the new professional era. It was an equally momentous season off the field. The club split into two parts, with the professional side becoming part of Loftus Road Holdings PLC, who also owned Queens Park Rangers F.C. One element of the deal saw Wasps move from their traditional Sudbury home to share QPR's Loftus Road stadium.

In 1998, the now-professional Wasps again reached the final of the Tetley's Bitter Cup, but lost 18–48 to a strong Saracens side. The following year Wasps again reached the final, they defeated Newcastle Falcons 29–19 to claim their first cup final win. In 2000 Wasps reached the final for the third consecutive year, successfully defending their title in a 31–23 victory over Northampton Saints.

=== London Wasps: 1999–2014 ===
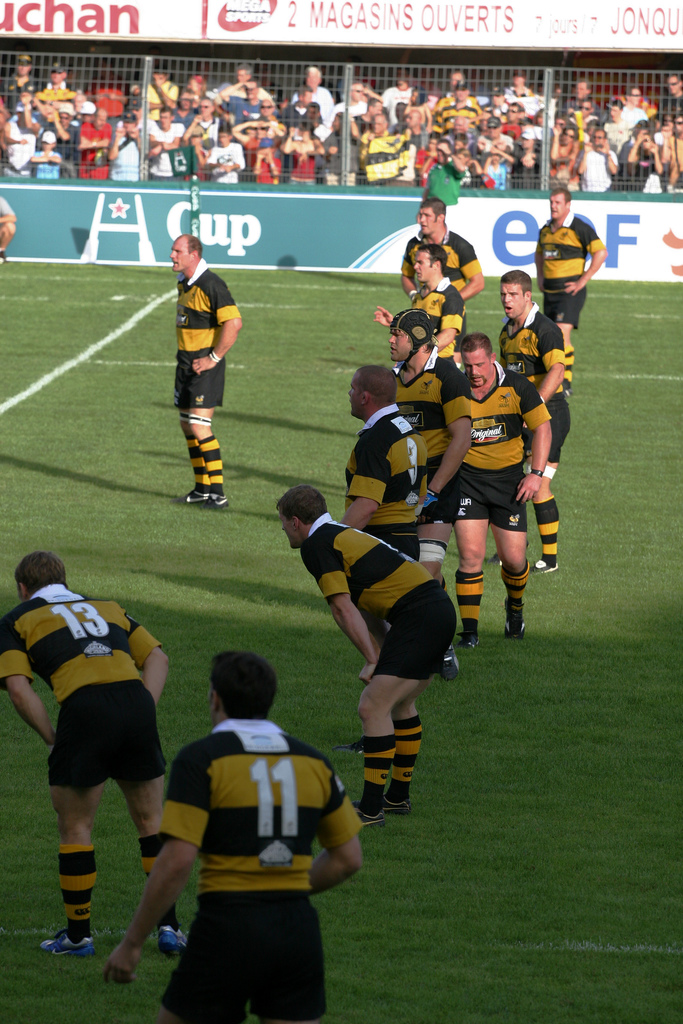
A match between Wasps and Perpignan in 2006

In the summer of 1999, the professional team – which had been operating as Wasps RFC (professional) since the 1996–97 season – was renamed as London Wasps, to differentiate it from Wasps FC, the amateur side of the club. At the same time they adopted a new logo, which was selected as being in keeping with the club's history.

In 2001 ex-Wigan rugby league star Shaun Edwards joined as a coach. He has largely been credited with creating Wasps' famous Blitz Defence that stops teams and is the basis for Wasps' own scoring chances. London Wasps agreed to move out of Loftus Road to allow Fulham F.C. to groundshare for two seasons between 2002 and 2004, while their ground, Craven Cottage, was redeveloped. They became tenants to Wycombe Wanderers F.C. at Adams Park at the end of the 2001–02 season. The success of Wasps at their new ground meant they did not return to Loftus Road after Fulham left.

In the 2002–03 European Challenge Cup, Wasps made their way to the final, where they met Bath. Though Bath beat them in numerous finals in the 1990s, Wasps emerged as champions, winning 48–30 at the Madejski Stadium. They also defeated Northampton Saints in the Premiership semi-final, after finishing second in the league table. They then faced Gloucester in the final at Twickenham, to win in their first English title since 1997, by 39 points to 3.

Wasps finished top of their pool in the 2003–04 Heineken Cup, where they went on to defeat Gloucester at the quarter-finals and won a final berth after beating Munster 37–32 in the semi-finals. They met Toulouse in the final at Twickenham, where they became champions, defeating the French side 27–20, winning their first Heineken Cup. Wasps followed up the win the following week, again at Twickenham, by beating Bath to retain the title of England's champion side, and complete a double.

In December 2004 the RFU revealed that the team was to be disqualified from the Powergen Cup for fielding an ineligible player, hooker Jonny Barrett, in a sixth-round game against Bristol. Wasps went through the season well, after the cup glitch, and retained the English title for a second time, by beating Leicester Tigers in the final at Twickenham. Edwards, however, was not a totally happy man as Wasps conceded their first try of the three Premiership finals in the dying minutes. Warren Gatland signed off at Wasps with a rare smile to continue his coaching with Waikato in New Zealand.

Ian McGeechan became the new Director of Rugby at Wasps from the 2005–06 season, taking over from Gatland. Wasps won the Powergen Anglo-Welsh Cup in the 2005–06 season, beating Llanelli Scarlets in the final at Twickenham. Before the 2006–07 season began, Wasps won the Middlesex 7s in Twickenham, beating Leicester Tigers in the final.

In England's game against Wales at the Millennium Stadium in Cardiff in the 2007 Six Nations Championship, Wasps supplied the back row of the scrum, James Haskell, Joe Worsley and Tom Rees all made an appearance. This was the first time that any club supplied the entire back row. Unfortunately for England, Wales won the encounter 27 to 18.

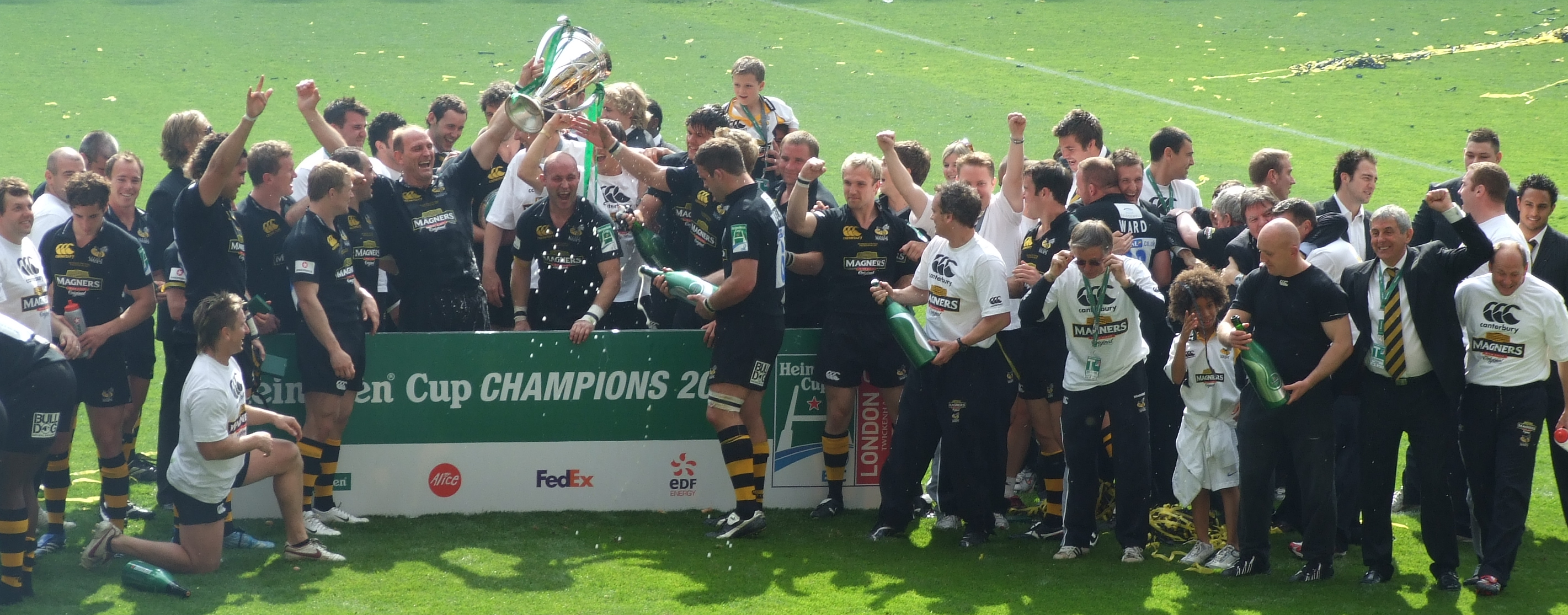
Wasps celebrate after their win in 2007

In the 2006–07 Heineken Cup, Wasps qualified by topping their group for a home quarter-final. They were drawn against Leinster on 31 March. There was a full house at Adams Park, and three players in total were sent to the sin bin, Lawrence Dallaglio in the last moments of the first half, Dominic Waldouck of London Wasps and Malcolm O'Kelly of Leinster later spent time there as well. The final score was 35–13 to wasps. In the semi-final at Coventry City's Ricoh Arena on 22 April, Wasps beat Northampton 30–13 and in doing so, gained a place in the Heineken Cup Final against Leicester Tigers at Twickenham.

Leicester Tigers were the favourites, as they had already won the Anglo-Welsh cup and the Guinness Premiership, the latter just the week before. Wasps went ahead early, and while Leicester kept in the match, Wasps won 25–9, thanks to penalties by Alex King and tries by Raphaël Ibañez and Eoin Reddan to become 2007 champions.

During the 2007–08 season, Wasps went from 10th in the league during October, to beat Leicester Tigers in the Guinness Premiership Final. This sealed a dream send-off for the retiring Lawrence Dallaglio at Twickenham. Wasps won 26–16 thanks to penalties by Mark van Gisbergen and tries by Josh Lewsey and Tom Rees to become the English 2008 champions. Wasps have now won six league titles in all, equal with Bath and just one behind Leicester.

The 2008–09 season was to see Wasps come unstuck. With their captain having retired, many of the players failed to play to their full potential. Wasps would eventually finish in seventh place, having also failed to reach the knock-out stages of the Heineken Cup and EDF Anglo Welsh Cup. On 12 May 2009 it was announced in the evening standard that Ian McGeechan had been forced to step down and will now take a consultancy role both at London Wasps and London Scottish. This was confirmed by the BBC on 14 May. Tony Hanks, a former coach at the club, was announced as the new Director of Rugby soon after. He had more recently been coaching at Waikato and also been a stand in for McGeechan for the latter part of the 2008/09 season, while he was primarily committed to British and Irish Lions duty. McGeechan had technically been a Lions employee for the whole season and through agreement with Wasps was loaned back to the club.

The 2009–10 season started off with an exodus of key players including James Haskell and Tom Palmer who moved to Stade Français Paris, Riki Flutey who also crossed the channel to join Brive and Eoin Reddan who left to join Leinster in Ireland.

In late February it was announced that Danny Cipriani would be leaving for the Melbourne Rebels in Australia and he was determined to leave on a high.

After beating Gloucester 42–26 in the quarter-final of the Amlin Cup scoring five tries (including a hat-trick from winger Tom Varndell), Wasps lost 15–18 at home to Cardiff Blues in the semi-final with Dave Walder kicking all of Wasps points with five penalties. Cardiff subsequently beat French Top 14 side Toulon in the final of the competition at the Stade Vélodrome in Marseille.

Shaun Edwards left the club in November 2011.

Wasps had a poor 2011–12 season, finishing in their lowest position for many seasons in 11th place, narrowly avoiding relegation from the Premiership. The season was notable for a good start where Wasps beat with a 15–20 reigning champions Saracens at Twickenham in the opening match and then runners-up Leicester in the second match with a 35–29. Things went downhill from there on as the worst injury toll known to professional rugby union hit the squad with a combined total of 16 serious and long-term injuries and retirements.

Dai Young recruited well through the summer bringing in players such as Andrea Masi (2012 6 Nations Player Of The Tournament) and Stephen Jones. He also welcomed back former Wasps Tom Palmer and James Haskell.

Wasps beat their record of their European highest-scoring margin with a 90–17 win against Viadana on 12 October 2013, beating the 77–17 margin of victory against Toulouse on 26 October 1996.

=== Wasps Rugby relocation to West Midlands: 2014 ===
The Wasps Rugby logo used from 2014 to 2021

On 30 June 2014, the club announced that the "London" prefix of the name had been dropped, returning to Wasps for the first time since the re-branding in 1999.

In September 2014, Simon Gilbert, of the Coventry Telegraph reported the side were in talks to permanently relocate to the Ricoh Arena in Coventry, from their home at Adams Park, in High Wycombe. In October 2014 Wasps announced that from December 2014 they would play their home games at the Ricoh Arena. On 14 November 2014 Wasps confirmed the purchase of the final 50% of shares in the stadium from the Higgs Charity to become outright owners of the facility.

Their first game as owners was a 48–16 win against London Irish on 21 December 2014.

=== Wasps in Coventry: 2014–2022 ===
The 2014–15 season saw Wasps finish 6th. Andy Goode was the Premiership's top scorer, ending the season with 240 points.

Things improved for Wasps in the 2015–16 season, with them finishing 3rd in the league. They lost their play-off semi-final with eventual runners-up Exeter Chiefs.

Wasps finished 1st in the 2016–17 regular season. Despite this success, Wasps went on to lose to Exeter Chiefs in the play-off final, having beaten Leicester in the semi-final.

In the 2017–18 regular season, Wasps finished 3rd. They faced Saracens in the semi-final play-off, but lost 57–33. The 2017–18 season marked 150 years since the foundation of Wasps Rugby Football Club and was celebrated with an anniversary game against Bath Rugby.

The 2018–19 campaign saw Wasps slip to an 8th-place finish overall. Across the season, Wasps recorded 10 wins and 12 losses.

The 2019–20 Gallagher Premiership Season saw huge improvement for Wasps who finished 2nd in the table (71 points) behind league leaders Exeter Chiefs (74 points). As a result of finishing 2nd, Wasps earned a home semi-final against Bristol Bears on Saturday 10 October 2020 at the Ricoh Arena in Coventry. Wasps won 47–24 earning a place in the Gallagher Premiership Final on Saturday 24 October 2020 against Exeter Chiefs at Twickenham Stadium. In a repeat of the outcome of the 2016–17 Final, Wasps were defeated by Exeter Chiefs. The result was 19–13.

The 2020–21 season saw another slump for Wasps who fell out of the Top 4 playoff positions, finishing 8th in the table.

In May 2021 it was announced that Wasps' home stadium would be renamed to the Coventry Building Society Arena. On Monday 19 July 2021, Wasps announced a new logo to bring all elements of Wasps including the Netball team, Women and Amateur rugby sides under one new visual identity.

=== Financial troubles and administration: 2022 ===
On 15 May 2022, Wasps failed to repay the £35 million bond finance they had raised in 2015, however stated they hoped to re-finance by 13 August. On 13 August 2022, Wasps did not refinance the bond, with owner Derek Richardson stating "we are not in administration and we are not going to be" after rumours of administration appeared on the internet.

On 21 September 2022, Wasps Holdings announced their intention to appoint administrators due to ongoing financial difficulty. After a second notice of intention was filed on 4 October, the club were suspended from all tournaments on 12 October due to inability to field a team and Wasps Holdings were placed into administration on 17 October 2022 with all their playing and coaching staff made redundant. The team had their current results removed and were also relegated to the RFU Championship, the second tier of English rugby. The club had debts totalling £95 million.

On 30 October it was confirmed that the administrators had accepted an offer from a consortium to buy the club, with the RFU expecting a 'decision ahead of Christmas.'

The club confirmed on 16 December that the club had been successfully sold and exited administration. It was also confirmed that they had satisfied all RFU requirements to join the Championship from the 2023–24 season. They were rumoured to be remaining in the West Midlands as they were rumoured to have agreed a groundshare with Solihull Moors at the ARMCO Arena.

Following an extended deadline of 14 February 2023 to submit an application to the RFU Wasps were announced as formally able to compete in the Championship for the 2023–24 season on 15 February. However, this position was rescinded on 18 May 2023 as a result of a failure to hit a deadline to confirm commitments made when the licence was first approved in December. As a result, they were immediately placed "at the bottom of the playing pyramid in tier ten" of the English rugby union system, but as of 2025 are yet to resume competitive play.

In 2023 a Sevenoaks District Council spokesman said that Wasps, owned by Christopher Holland, were considering building a multi-use stadium, training facilities, a hotel, and enabling development on the outskirts of Swanley, Kent.

== Rivalries ==
Wasps' main rival were Harlequins in Twickenham, London. Both clubs were once unified as Hampstead Football Club. Wasps split from Hampstead Football Club (which changed its name to Harlequin F.C. in 1870) over discord among members in 1867.

Following Wasps' move to Coventry, Wasps tried to kindle rivalries with other clubs in the Midlands of England. This included the likes of Leicester Tigers and Northampton Saints leading one rugby commentator to state that the games, "lack the history that a derby demands".

== Wasps Netball ==
Wasps expanded their sporting brand in 2016 with the addition of Wasps Netball. They play their home games at the Indoor Arena - Coventry located in the Coventry Building Society Arena.

In the 2018 and 2019 Netball Superleague seasons, they finished in top position, with Loughborough Lightning in 2nd place. Both teams proceeded to the Grand Final for a 2017 rematch, with Wasps winning their 2nd consecutive title with a scoreline identical to the 2017 and 2018 finals.

Wasps Netball were also placed into administration on 17 October 2022 with all their playing and coaching staff made redundant.

On 10 November 2022, England Netball announced that Wasps Netball would no longer be eligible to compete in the Netball Super League moving forwards.

== Home ground ==
Wasps' first home was in Finchley Road, North London although subsequent years saw grounds being rented in various parts of London. In 1923 the club moved to a permanent home at Repton Avenue, Sudbury, Middlesex, eventually buying the ground outright. Capacity at Repton Avenue was around 3,200, with 1,200 seated and 2,000 standing.

=== Loftus Road ===
In 1996 Wasps moved to play their home games at Queens Park Rangers' home ground, Loftus Road, in West London. The site of the ground at Sudbury was later developed for housing, though the original club house still stands and is used as a community centre.

=== Adams Park ===
Wasps made another move in 2002, this time 30 miles (48 km) west of Greater London, playing their home games at Wycombe Wanderers F.C.'s ground, Adams Park, in High Wycombe, Buckinghamshire. The attendance figure went up by 31.8% the next season. Between 2004 and 2015 Wasps took part in the London Double Header at Twickenham, this was a designated home match in 2005, 2007, 2010, 2012 and 2013. In 2006 this drew a crowd of 51,950, breaking the record set in 2004.

In 2007 Wasps, Wycombe Wanderers and Wycombe District Council entered a joint venture that would fund a new stadium in the High Wycombe area. The favoured site for the new stadium was at Wycombe Air Park, a 208-acre (0.84 km^{2}) site owned by Wycombe District Council and close to the M40 motorway. The planned stadium was of 16–17,000 capacity, and would have been the first new football ground in England with terraced section since the Taylor Report. The development would also have included retail, hotel, conference and other facilities. Wasps and Wanderers funding was primarily from Steve Hayes, who had become a 25% share holder through a £250,000 investment in Wycombe Wanderers in June 2004, when the football club became a plc company; and later became managing director. Hayes bought an 11.6% stake in London Wasps Holdings Ltd in August 2007, and became chairman of Lawrence Dallaglio's benefit committee. In December 2008, Hayes bought Wright's controlling interest and John O'Connell's share holding in Wasps to take complete control. After the stadium plans at Booker Airfield were turned down, Steve Hayes put the club up for sale, with Derek Richardson becoming principal shareholder in April 2013

=== Coventry Building Society Arena ===
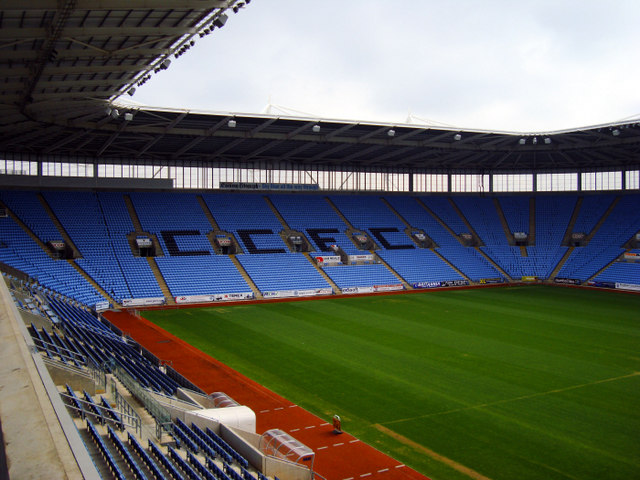
The Coventry Building Society Arena, Wasps' home ground from 2014 to 2022

Wasps' first official home game in Coventry was during the 2007–08 Heineken Cup when they used the Ricoh Arena as their home venue against Munster on 10 November 2007 due to its bigger capacity. While commercially the move was seen as a success, with Wasps winning the game 24–23 in front of a crowd of 21,506, the move attracted severe criticism from many of the club's supporters, citing the long distance from London (a round-trip of almost 200 miles for London-based fans). The club argued that they had little choice but to relocate the match as their landlords, Wycombe Wanderers, had a home FA Cup tie the same day.

On 7 October 2014, Wasps purchased 50% in Arena Coventry Ltd (the operating company of the Ricoh Arena) with the intention of relocating to the Midlands. After gaining a 100% stake in the company on 14 November 2014, Wasps played their first game in Coventry as owners on 21 December 2014; a 48–16 win against London Irish. While initially the relocation was only for 1st team home games; the club relocated completely ahead of the 2016–17 season.

After the team entered administration in 2022, the Coventry Building Society Arena was purchased by the Frasers Group on 17 November 2022 and Wasps ceased to be based there.

== Season summaries ==
	Premiership				Domestic cup		Europe	
Season	Competition	Final position	Points	Play-offs	Competition	Performance	Competition	Performance
1987–88	Courage League Division 1	2nd	36	N/A	John Player Cup	Semi-final	No competition	N/A
1988–89	Courage League Division 1	3rd	15	N/A	Pilkington Cup	Quarter-final	No competition	N/A
1989–90	Courage League Division 1	1st	18	N/A	Pilkington Cup	3rd round	No competition	N/A
1990–91	Courage League Division 1	2nd	19	N/A	Pilkington Cup	Quarter-final	No competition	N/A
1991–92	Courage League Division 1	7th	12	N/A	Pilkington Cup	4th round	No competition	N/A
1992–93	Courage League Division 1	2nd	22	N/A	Pilkington Cup	Semi-final	No competition	N/A
1993–94	Courage League Division 1	3rd	21	N/A	Pilkington Cup	4th round	No competition	N/A
1994–95	Courage League Division 1	3rd	26	N/A	Pilkington Cup	Runners-up	No competition	N/A
1995–96	Courage League Division 1	4th	22	N/A	Pilkington Cup	Quarter-final	No competition	N/A
1996–97	Courage League Division 1	1st	37	N/A	Pilkington Cup	5th round	Heineken Cup	3rd in pool
1997–98	Allied Dunbar Premiership	9th	17	N/A	Tetley's Bitter Cup	Runners-up	Heineken Cup	Quarter-final
1997–98	Allied Dunbar Premiership	9th	17	N/A	C&G Cup	Pool Stage	Heineken Cup	Quarter-final
1998–99	Allied Dunbar Premiership	5th	31	N/A	Tetley's Bitter Cup	Champions	No English teams	N/A
1999–00	Allied Dunbar Premiership	7th	32	N/A	Tetley's Bitter Cup	Champions	Heineken Cup	Quarter-final
2000–01	Zurich Premiership	2nd	74	N/A	Tetley's Bitter Cup	4th round	Heineken Cup	3rd in pool
2001–02	Zurich Premiership	7th	54	N/A	Powergen Cup	6th round	Heineken Cup	3rd in pool
2002–03	Zurich Premiership	2nd	67	Champions	Powergen Cup	6th round	Challenge Cup	Champions
2003–04	Zurich Premiership	2nd	73	Champions	Powergen Cup	Quarter-final	Heineken Cup	Champions
2004–05	Zurich Premiership	2nd	73	Champions	Powergen Cup	6th round	Heineken Cup	3rd in pool
2005–06	Guinness Premiership	4th	64	Semi-final	Powergen Cup	Champions	Heineken Cup	2nd in pool
2006–07	Guinness Premiership	5th	61	–	EDF Energy Cup	4th in pool	Heineken Cup	Champions
2007–08	Guinness Premiership	2nd	70	Champions	EDF Energy Cup	Semi-final	Heineken Cup	3rd in pool
2008–09	Guinness Premiership	7th	53	–	EDF Energy Cup	2nd in pool	Heineken Cup	2nd in pool
2009–10	Guinness Premiership	5th	57	–	LV= Cup	2nd in pool	Challenge Cup	Semi-final
2010–11	Aviva Premiership	9th	43	–	LV= Cup	2nd in pool	Challenge Cup*	Quarter-final*
2011–12	Aviva Premiership	11th	33	–	LV= Cup	4th in pool	Challenge Cup	Quarter-final
2012–13	Aviva Premiership	8th	48	–	LV= Cup	4th in pool	Challenge Cup	Quarter-final
2013–14	Aviva Premiership	7th	49	–	LV= Cup	4th in pool	Challenge Cup	Semi-final
2014–15	Aviva Premiership	6th	61	–	LV= Cup	3rd in pool	Champions Cup	Quarter-final
2015–16	Aviva Premiership	3rd	72	Semi-final	No competition	N/A	Champions Cup	Semi-final
2016–17	Aviva Premiership	1st	84	Runners-up	Anglo-Welsh Cup	2nd in pool	Champions Cup	Quarter-final
2017–18	Aviva Premiership	3rd	71	Semi-final	Anglo-Welsh Cup	3rd in pool	Champions Cup	2nd in pool
2018–19	Gallagher Premiership	8th	51	–	Premiership Cup	4th in pool	Champions Cup	4th in pool
2019–20	Gallagher Premiership	2nd	71	Runners-up	Premiership Cup	3rd in pool	Challenge Cup	3rd in pool
2020–21	Gallagher Premiership	8th	50	-	No competition	N/A	Champions Cup	Round of 16
2021–22	Gallagher Premiership	9th	60	—	Premiership Cup	3rd in pool	Champions Cup	10th in pool
2021–22	Gallagher Premiership	9th	60	—	Premiership Cup	3rd in pool	Challenge Cup	Semi-final

Gold background denotes champions
Silver background denotes runners-up
Pink background denotes relegated

* After dropping into the competition from the Champions Cup/Heineken Cup

- As Wasps FC – 1987–1996
- As Wasps RFC – 1996–1999
- As London Wasps – 1999–2014
- As Wasps Rugby – 2014–2022

== Club honours ==
=== Wasps RFC ===
- Premiership Rugby
  - Champions: (6) 1989–90*, 1996–97**, 2002–03^, 2003–04^, 2004–05^, 2007–08^
  - Runners-up: (6) 1987–88*, 1990–91*, 1992–93*, 2000–01^, 2016–17**, 2019–20**
- European Rugby Champions Cup
  - Champions: (2) 2003–04^, 2006–07^
- European Challenge Cup
  - Champions: (1) 2002–03^
- Anglo-Welsh Cup
  - Champions: (3) 1998–99**, 1999–2000^, 2005–06^
  - Runners-up: (4) 1985–86*, 1986–87*, 1994–95*, 1997–98**
- Middlesex Senior Cup
  - Champions: (8) 1973–74*, 1974–75*, 1976–77*, 1977–78*, 1978–79*, 1981–82*, 1983–84*, 1986–87*
  - Runners-up: (4) 1975–76*, 1979–80*, 1982–83*, 1985–86*

=== Wasps A ===
- Premiership Rugby Shield
  - Champions: (2) 2006–07^, 2007–08^
  - Runners-up: (2) 2004–05^, 2008–09^

=== Friendly ===
- Middlesex Sevens
  - Champions: (5) 1948*, 1952*, 1985*, 1993*, 2006^
  - Runners-up: (4) 1933*, 1951*, 1996*, 2005^
- Premiership Rugby Sevens Series
  - Champions: (2) 2016**, 2017**
  - Runners-up: (2) 2015**, 2018**

* As Wasps FC – 1987–1996
** As Wasps RFC – 1996–1999 & 2014–2022
^ As London Wasps – 1999–2014

== Head Coach/Director of Rugby ==
Name	Years	Notes
Rob Smith	1981–1996	Also London Wasps academy director until 2013
Nigel Melville	1996–2002	Became Director of Professional Rugby at the RFU, and CEO of USA Rugby
Warren Gatland	2002–2005	Later Wales head coach, and British & Irish Lions head coach
Ian McGeechan	2005–2009	
Tony Hanks	2009–2011	
Leon Holden	2011	Interim Director of Rugby until end of 2010–11 season
Dai Young	2011–2020	
Lee Blackett	2020–2022	Last head coach.

== Ownership ==
Irish businessman Derek Richardson became principal shareholder of Wasps group in April 2013, taking the group from the brink of insolvency. He remained principal shareholder right up until the club was in administration in October 2022 with over £100m of debt. Christopher Holland purchased the club from their administrator in 2022.

== Kit ==
On 29 April 2021, Wasps announced a new multi-year deal with Danish sportswear manufacturer Hummel to become 'technical and retail partner'. The contract, commencing the 2021–22 season, would see Wasps become the first British domestic rugby union team to use the company.

Previous manufacturers include Canterbury and Kukri. The first away kit produced by Kukri in 2012 (a hooped blue away shirt) was a change from the white or black and gold hoops traditionally used as a tie in with the clubs chosen charity MIND in a combined effort to help raise the awareness of mental health issues in sport.

== Notable former players ==
=== Rugby World Cup ===
The following are players which have represented their countries at the Rugby World Cup, whilst playing for Wasps:

Tournament	Players selected	England players	Other national team players
1987	6	Rob Andrew, Mark Bailey, Huw Davies, Jeff Probyn, Paul Rendall, Kevin Simms	
1991	4	Rob Andrew, Chris Oti, Jeff Probyn, Paul Rendall	
1995	2	Rob Andrew, Damien Hopley	
1999	6	Lawrence Dallaglio, Martyn Wood, Joe Worsley	Andy Reed, Kenny Logan (Scotland) , Trevor Leota (Samoa)
2003	6	Stuart Abbott, Lawrence Dallaglio, Josh Lewsey, Simon Shaw, Joe Worsley	Kenny Logan (Scotland)
2007	10	Lawrence Dallaglio, Josh Lewsey, Tom Rees, Paul Sackey, Simon Shaw, Joe Worsley, Phil Vickery (c)	Daniel Leo (Samoa) , Raphaël Ibañez (c) (France) , Eoin Reddan (Ireland)
2011	9	Steve Thompson, Joe Simpson	Genaro Fessia (Argentina) , Victor Gresev, Vladislav Korshunov (c) (Russia) , Paul Emerick (United States) , Tinus du Plessis, Heinz Koll (Namibia) , Zak Taulafo (Samoa)
2015	5	James Haskell, Joe Launchbury	Bradley Davies (Wales) , Lorenzo Cittadini, Andrea Masi (Italy)
2019	2	Joe Launchbury	Matteo Minozzi (Italy)

=== Lions tourists ===
The following players have been selected to tour with the Lions while members of Wasps:

- 1983: Nigel Melville
- 1989: Rob Andrew, Chris Oti
- 1993: Rob Andrew
- 1997: Lawrence Dallaglio
- 2001: Rob Henderson, Phil Greening, Lawrence Dallaglio
- 2005: Josh Lewsey, Matt Dawson, Lawrence Dallaglio
- 2009: Tim Payne, Phil Vickery, Simon Shaw, Joe Worsley, Riki Flutey
- 2013: Christian Wade
- 2017: James Haskell, Elliot Daly

== See also ==
- Rugby union in Coventry
- Rugby union in England
- Wasps Netball, Netball Superleague team run by Wasps
