= Ollie Allsopp =

English rugby union player

- Born: Oliver Allsopp; 13 June 1998 (age 28) Kidderminster, Worcestershire, England
- Height: 1.8 m (5 ft 11 in)
- Weight: 91 kg (14 st 5 lb)
- School: Malvern College

Rugby union career
- Position: Centre/Fly Half
- Current team: Hartpury University
Senior career
Years	Team	Apps	(Points)
2016–2017	Hartpury University	0	(0)
2017-2018	→ Luctonians	7	(30)
2018-2020	Birmingham Moseley	40	(25)
2020-2021	London Scottish	4	(0)
2021-2022	→ Luctonians	12	(20)
2022	Harlequins	7	(14)
2022-2025	Birmingham Moseley	85	(139)
2025-	Hartpury University	31	(35)
- Correct as of 15 February 2026

Oliver "Ollie" Allsopp (born 13 June 1998) is an English professional rugby union player for Hartpury University in the Champ Rugby. He plays as a centre or fly-half. He previously played for Harlequins, London Scottish in the RFU Championship, Luctonians and Birmingham Moseley

== Early life ==
Ollie attended Malvern College where he was 1XV rugby captain, and played there with James Scott (rugby union). Whilst at Malvern, Ollie was also 1XI cricket and played alongside Jack Haynes and Zen Malik with their head of cricket Mark Hardinges.

During Allsopp's youth career, he first played rugby at Chaddesley Corbett rugby club near Kidderminster before transferring to Worcester RFC before slowly progressing into Worcester Warriors academy and playing U18s level. He also represented Worcester in the 2017 Premiership Rugby Sevens Series at Franklin's Gardens and scored in their 24-28 loss against Newcastle Falcons in the Cup quarter-final. Ollie also had numerous appearances for Worcester at Premiership Rugby Shield level for them, alongside fellow professionals Ted Hill, Jamie Shillcock and Will Butler.

Allsopp then went to study at Hartpury University where he was also involved in the team that won the BUCS Super Rugby championship in 2016-17 against University of Exeter at Twickenham Stadium in a team captained by Sebastian Negri and consisting of Harry Randall and Alex Craig.

== Career ==
While still a student at Hartpury University, Ollie signed for Luctonians where he was also a crucial part of their team and survival in National League 2 North in the 2017-18 season.

He made his Moseley debut at home against Darlington Mowden Park and was also involved in the clubs historic pre season 24-15 win against Worcester Warriors in 2017.

On the 3rd of April 2019, Allsopp signed for London Scottish F.C., where he gained 4 appearances for the London side. He made his debut in a pre-season encounter against Edinburgh Rugby at Murrayfield Stadium. While at the club, Allsopp went on loan to Luctonians and Harlequins F.C. in the Premiership Rugby Shield.

Allsopp then returned back to Birmingham Moseley Rugby. He also worked at Royal Grammar School Worcester during his first tenure at Moseley as a sport assistant alongside head of rugby Robert Lewis and Aleki Lutui. In 2022, Allsopp coached RGS to a Modus Cup victory 20-17 alongside his other coaches Robert Lewis and Aleki Lutui. Allsopp re-joined RGS Worcester coaching team for the 2025 edition of the Modus Cup and coached them to a 21-20 victory.. In September 2026, Allsopp once again joined Lewis to coach at Hereford Cathedral School alongside his playing at Hartpury

Ollie proved critical for Birmingham Moseley Rugby winning their player of the season in the 2023/24 season in a pivotal season for the club where they finished third place in the National League One table in a team consisting of Greg Fisilau, Ashley Johnson, Tuoyo Egodo, Seb Nagle-Taylor and Rekeiti Ma'asi-White. On 13 May 2025, it was announced Allsopp would be leaving Birmingham Moseley. On 4 September 2025, it was announced Allsopp would sign for Hartpury University in Champ Rugby.

Allsopp made his non competitive debut starting at 12 against Dragons in a pre season encounter that Hartpury lost 45-12. and made his competitive debut for Hartpury against Cornish Pirates on the opening round of the 2025/26 Champ Rugby season on the 4 October 2025. Allsopp was also involved in their historic 28-25 win over Worcester Warriors which was the first ever encounter between the two clubs. Additionally, Allsopp put in a man of the match performance on the 25 October, where he played against Chinnor R.F.C., which was also the game where he scored his first try for Hartpury. Allsopp then put in a team of the week performance in round 13 against Worcester Warriors at Sixways Stadium in their historic 34-28 win over the team. Allsopp won Hartpury player of the season in his first season as a player for them. Allsopp proved a critical part of the Hartpury team, where they had a record breaking year, qualifying for the playoffs against Coventry R.F.C. after defeating Cornish Pirates at home to qualify. Hartpury lost to Coventry away in the quarter final, with a 28-25 score, where Allsopp scored 2 tries.
