= Robert Lewis (rugby union) =

Welsh rugby union player

Rob Lewis
- Born: Robert Lewis; 20 November 1987 (age 38) Abergavenny, Wales
- Height: 1.87 m (6 ft 2 in)
- Weight: 94 kg (14 st 11 lb)
- School: Hereford Cathedral School
- University: The Open University
- Notable relative: James Lewis (brother)

Rugby union career
- Position: Scrum-half
Senior career
Years	Team	Apps	(Points)
2005–2006	Newport RFC	4	(0)
2006–2007	Neath RFC	21	(5)
2007–2009	Newport Gwent Dragons	15	(5)
2007–2009	Ebbw Vale	38	(15)
2009–2012	London Welsh	88	(55)
2012–2013	Cardiff Blues	0	(0)
2012–2017	London Welsh	93	(30)
2017	Ebbw Vale RFC		
2017–2019	Birmingham Moseley Rugby Club	46	(35)
International career
Years	Team	Apps	(Points)
2005	Wales U19		
2007	Wales U21		
National sevens team
Years	Team		Comps
2007–2008	Wales Sevens		

Robert Lewis (born 20 November 1987) is a Welsh rugby union player. Lewis primarily played for Newport Gwent Dragons, London Welsh RFC, and Birmingham Moseley. Lewis represented Wales at grade age levels, as well as in rugby sevens.

== Professional career ==
A scrum-half, he has represented Wales at U18, U19 and at U21 level, and was selected for the Wales Sevens squad in 2007, in which he competed in four tournaments, – Adelaide, Wellington, Hong Kong and San Diego. He was a key figure for Wales U19s, helping them win the Six Nations Championship Grand Slam and was Wales's top try scorer in the tournament. The same year he represented Wales U19 at the Junior World Cup in Dubai.

Robert came through the Newport Gwent Dragons Academy learning his trade with Ebbw Vale RFC and made his debut for the region in December 2007, coming off the bench away to Munster. He would go on to make a further 14 appearances for the Newport Gwent Dragons gaining Celtic League, LV Cup and four Heineken Cup experiences. Lewis scored a try in the Christmas period derby win over the Ospreys.

In May 2009 Lewis joined London Welsh and made a total of 88 appearances in three seasons and in 2011–2012 he played a major role in London Welsh winning the English Championship, beating Cornish Pirates in the two leg final and gaining promotion to the Aviva Premiership. During Lewis’s first spell at London Welsh RFC he represented The Barbarians, helping them to a narrow victory over the Combined Services at Aldershot RFC.

In July 2012 he joined Cardiff Blues but in December he returned to London Welsh who were then competing in the Premiership. Lewis again played a major role in London Welsh winning the English Championship for a second time in 2013–2014 and went on to play in a total of 136 league games making him the second highest in league appearances in the club's history after Matt Corker.

Following the unfortunate financial situation at London Welsh and its loss of a licence to continue to play in the RFU Greene King Championship, Rob returned to Ebbw Vale RFC in January 2017. On 16 March 2017 Birmingham Moseley Rugby Club announced that Lewis was the first new signing for the club's 2017–2018 National League 1 campaign. In his second season at Birmingham Moseley Lewis was announced as Captain, alongside Buster Lawrence and Sam Brown.

After a two season spell in Birmingham Lewis would go on to join Luctonians RFC, whilst also becoming Head Coach at Malvern College.

In September 2020 Lewis was appointed as the Head of Rugby at Royal Grammar School Worcester.. Lewis, alongside his coaching team consisting of Aleki Lutui and Ollie Allsopp coached RGS to Modus Cup success in 2022, winning 20-17, and in 2025, winning 21-20.. On 12th May 2025, Lewis was appointed Director of Senior Rugby at National League Two West club Luctonians, where he used to play.

== Personal ==
Robert's twin brother James Lewis is also a professional rugby union player.
