= 2014 Premiership Rugby Sevens Series =

2014 Premiership Rugby 7s Series
- Countries: England; Wales
- Champions: Gloucester 7s
- Runners-up: Newport Gwent Dragons 7s
- Matches played: 34
- Tries scored: 202 (average 5.9 per match)

The 2014 Premiership Rugby Sevens Series was the fifth Rugby Union 7-a-side competition for the twelve 2014–15 Aviva Premiership Clubs, and the first to include the four Welsh Regions that compete in the Pro12.

The pool stage of the tournament will start on 26 July 2014, before continuing on 31 July - 2 August 2014. The final took place on 8 August 2014.

== Inclusion of Wales ==
On 20 May 2014, it was announced that this season, the 4 Welsh regions - Cardiff Blues, Newport Gwent Dragons, Ospreys and Scarlets - would join the series. They would play in their own pool, hosted at the BT Sport Cardiff Arms Park, and the top two regions would progress to contest the Series Final.

== Format ==
The sixteen teams were split into four groups - A, B, C & D, based on geographical location. Each team in the group played each other once, to the International Rugby Board Laws of the Game - 7s Variations. Based on the result, teams received:

- 4 points for a win
- 2 points for a draw
- 1 bonus point for a loss by seven points or less
- 1 bonus point for scoring four or more tries in a match

Following all each group, the winner and runner up in each group progressed to the Final Stage. In the final, the 8 teams (4 Winners and 4 Runners up) were arranged into 4 quarter-final pairings. The winners of each match qualified for the Cup semi-finals, with the losers moving into a new Plate competition. Thereafter, competition was a simple knockout bracket, with the winner of the Cup final being declared the series winner.

== Group stage ==
Group A	Group B	Group C	Group D
Cardiff Blues 7s	Bath 7s	Harlequins 7s	Leicester Tigers 7s
Newport Gwent Dragons 7s	Exeter Chiefs 7s	Northampton Saints 7s	London Welsh 7s
Ospreys 7s	Gloucester 7s	Saracens 7s	Newcastle Falcons 7s
Scarlets 7s	London Irish 7s	Wasps 7s	Sale Sharks 7s

=== Group A ===
Played at BT Sport Cardiff Arms Park, Cardiff on Saturday 26 July 2014. The pool will feature the Welsh Regions.

Pos	Team	Pld	W	D	L	F	A	TF	TA	TB	LB	Pts
1	Cardiff Blues 7s	3	2	1	0	74	47	12	7	2	0	12
2	Newport Gwent Dragons 7s	3	2	1	0	73	38	11	6	1	0	11
3	Scarlets 7s	3	1	0	2	82	71	12	11	1	1	6
4	Ospreys 7s	3	0	0	3	54	127	8	19	1	0	1
Green background is the pool winner and qualifies for the Final Stage. Blue background is the runner-up and also qualifies for the Final Stage. Updated 27 July 2014 — source: Premiership Rugby

26 July 2014
19:15

Cardiff Blues 7s	33-21	Ospreys 7s
	Report

Cardiff Arms Park

26 July 2014
19:40

Newport Gwent Dragons 7s	21-14	Scarlets 7s
	Report

Cardiff Arms Park

26 July 2014
20:10

Newport Gwent Dragons 7s	33-5	Ospreys 7s
	Report

Cardiff Arms Park

26 July 2014
20:35

Cardiff Blues 7s	22-7	Scarlets 7s
	Report

Cardiff Arms Park

26 July 2014
21:05

Ospreys 7s	28-61	Scarlets 7s
	Report

Cardiff Arms Park

26 July 2014
21:30

Cardiff Blues 7s	19-19	Newport Gwent Dragons 7s
	Report

Cardiff Arms Park

=== Group B ===
Played at Kingsholm, Gloucester on Thursday 31 July 2014.

Pos	Team	Pld	W	D	L	F	A	TF	TA	TB	LB	Pts
1	Gloucester 7s	3	3	0	0	70	24	12	4	2	0	14
2	London Irish 7s	3	2	0	1	58	41	10	7	2	1	11
3	Exeter Chiefs 7s	3	1	0	2	52	65	8	11	1	0	5
4	Bath Rugby 7s	3	0	0	3	31	81	5	13	0	1	1
Green background is the pool winner and qualifies for the Final Stage. Blue background is the runner-up and also qualifies for the Final Stage. Updated 3 June 2014 — source: Premiership Rugby

31 July 2014
19:15

Gloucester 7s	29 - 14	Exeter Chiefs 7s

Kingsholm

31 July 2014
19:40

Bath 7s	19 - 24	London Irish 7s

Kingsholm

31 July 2014
20:10

Exeter Chiefs 7s	33 - 12	Bath 7s

Kingsholm

31 July 2014
20:35

Gloucester 7s	17 - 10	London Irish 7s

Kingsholm

31 July 2014
21:05

Exeter Chiefs 7s	5 - 24	London Irish 7s

Kingsholm

31 July 2014
21:30

Gloucester 7s	24 - 0	Bath 7s

Kingsholm

=== Group C ===
Played at Franklin's Gardens, Northampton on Friday 1 August 2014.

Pos	Team	Pld	W	D	L	F	A	TF	TA	TB	LB	Pts
1	Harlequins 7s	3	3	0	0	102	26	16	4	3	0	15
2	Northampton Saints 7s	3	2	0	1	62	75	10	11	2	0	10
3	Saracens 7s	3	1	0	2	47	81	7	13	1	0	5
4	Wasps 7s	3	0	0	3	54	83	8	13	0	2	2
Green background is the pool winner and qualifies for the Final Stage. Blue background is the runner-up and also qualifies for the Final Stage. Updated 3 June 2014 — source: Premiership Rugby

1 August 2014
19:15

Northampton Saints 7s	7 - 40	Harlequins 7s

Franklin's Gardens

1 August 2014
19:40

Saracens 7s	33 - 14	Wasps 7s

Franklin's Gardens

1 August 2014
20:10

Saracens 7s	0 - 36	Harlequins 7s

Franklin's Gardens

1 August 2014
20:35

Northampton Saints 7s	24 - 21	Wasps 7s

Franklin's Gardens

1 August 2014
21:05

Harlequins 7s	26 - 19	Wasps 7s

Franklin's Gardens

1 August 2014
21:30

Northampton Saints 7s	31 - 14	Saracens 7s

Franklin's Gardens

=== Group D ===
Group D was scheduled to be played at Kingston Park, Newcastle on Saturday 2 August 2014. However, following the decision by Newcastle Falcons to install a 3G pitch in preparation for the new season, it was announced that the round would be moved to The Darlington Arena

Pos	Team	Pld	W	D	L	F	A	TF	TA	TB	LB	Pts
1	Newcastle Falcons 7s	3	3	0	0	67	33	11	5	2	0	14
2	Leicester Tigers 7s	3	2	0	1	69	52	11	8	1	1	10
3	London Welsh 7s	3	1	0	2	34	45	6	7	0	1	5
4	Sale Sharks 7s	3	0	0	3	33	73	5	13	0	1	1
Green background is the pool winner and qualifies for the Final Stage. Blue background is the runner-up and also qualifies for the Final Stage. Updated 3 June 2014 — source: Premiership Rugby

2 August 2014
19:15

Newcastle Falcons 7s	26 - 21	Leicester Tigers 7s

Darlington Arena

2 August 2014
19:40

London Welsh 7s	15 - 14	Sale Sharks 7s

Darlington Arena

2 August 2014
20:10

London Welsh 7s	14 - 17	Leicester Tigers 7s

Darlington Arena

2 August 2014
20:35

Newcastle Falcons 7s	27 - 7	Sale Sharks 7s

Darlington Arena

2 August 2014
21:05

Leicester Tigers 7s	31 - 12	Sale Sharks 7s

Darlington Arena

2 August 2014
21:30

Newcastle Falcons 7s	14 - 5	London Welsh 7s

Darlington Arena

== Final stage ==
The final stage will be played at the Twickenham Stoop on Friday 8 August 2014. In a change to the previous competitions, in which teams competed in two pools and the best team in each pool and contested the final, the finals more closely resembled a sevens series finals day.

The four pool winners contested a quarter-final against a runner up from another pool. The winner of these quarter finals would compete in the cup competition, while the losers would compete in the plate competition.

=== Quarter-finals ===
8 August 2014
18:00

Cardiff Blues 7s	19 - 14	Leicester Tigers 7s

Twickenham Stoop

8 August 2014
18:25

Gloucester 7s	50 - 5	Northampton Saints 7s

Twickenham Stoop

8 August 2014
18:50

Harlequins 7s	26 - 10	London Irish 7s

Twickenham Stoop

8 August 2014
19:15

Newcastle Falcons 7s	10 - 12	Newport Gwent Dragons 7s

Twickenham Stoop

=== Plate Competition ===
==== Plate Semi-finals ====
8 August 2014
19:40

Leicester Tigers 7s	21 - 12	Northampton Saints 7s

Twickenham Stoop

8 August 2014
20:30

London Irish 7s	12 - 5	Newcastle Falcons 7s

Twickenham Stoop

==== Plate Final ====
8 August 2014
21:20

Leicester Tigers 7s	17 - 0	London Irish 7s

Twickenham Stoop

=== Cup Competition ===
==== Cup Semi-finals ====
8 August 2014
20:05

Cardiff Blues 7s	14 - 24	Gloucester 7s

Twickenham Stoop

8 August 2014
20:55

Harlequins 7s	15 - 19	Newport Gwent Dragons 7s

Twickenham Stoop

==== Cup Final ====
8 August 2014
21:45

Gloucester 7s	12 - 5	Newport Gwent Dragons 7s

Twickenham Stoop
Referee: Ian Tempest

Gloucester 7s win the 2014 Premiership Rugby Sevens Series

As with last year, the winner of the final qualifies for the World Club 7s. However, Gloucester have already qualified for the 2014 World Club 7s. As there can only one Welsh side in the tournament (the invited Cardiff Blues), Harlequins took the final place at the World Club 7s.
