= Tanners Hall =

Historic structure in Gloucester, England

Coordinates: 51°52′06″N 2°14′35″W

Tanners Hall was a 13th century town house and is now a ruin located on Gouda Way in Gloucester. It is the oldest non-religious building and only surviving medieval domestic stone house in the city. It became a Grade II listed building on 29 July 2015.

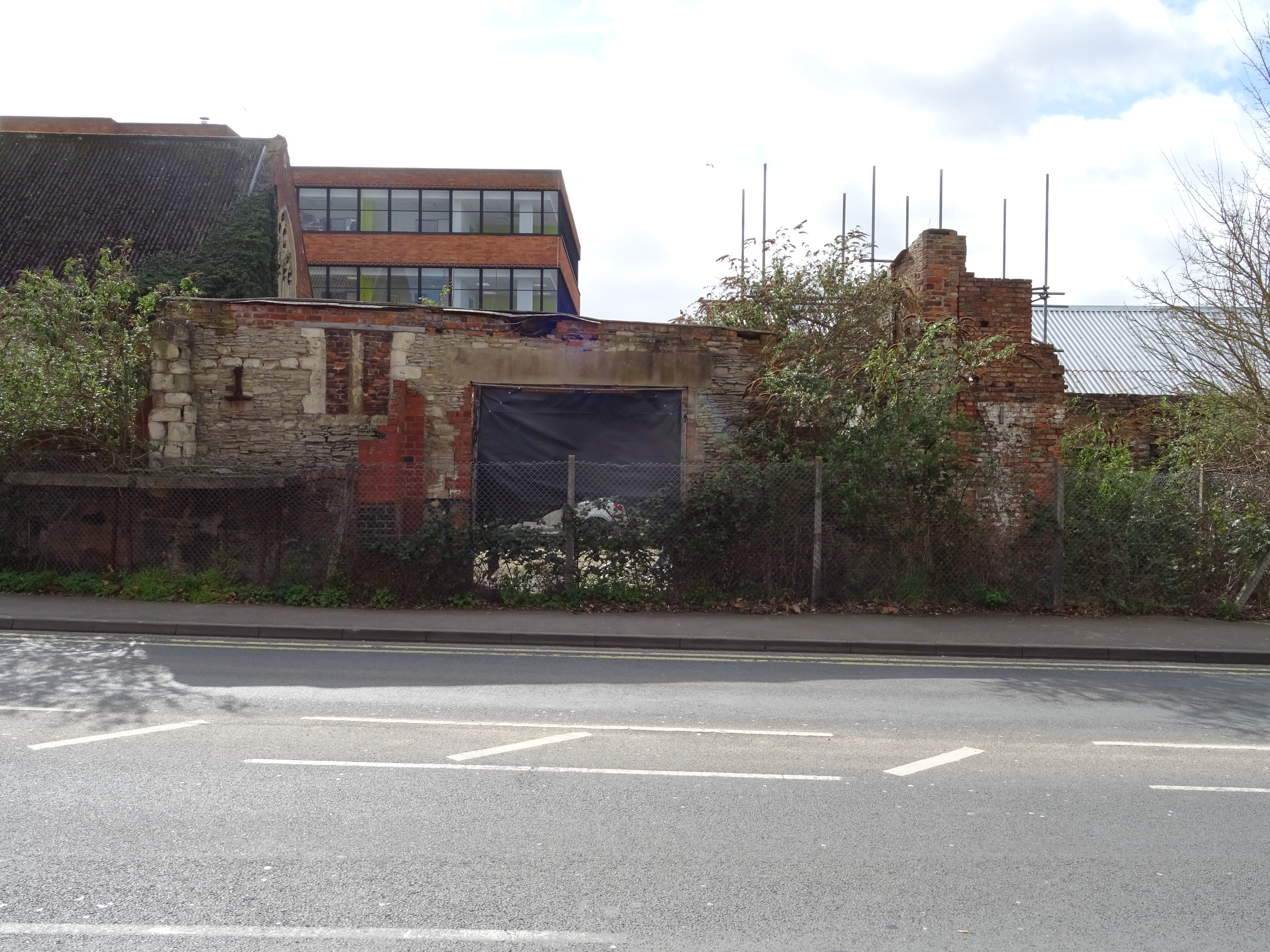
The ruins of Tanners Hall in March 2019

== History ==
Tanners Hall was originally a medieval merchants house built in the 13th century. It was taken over by Tanners in 1540 and was used as tannery until the 18th century. Excavations of the site have revealed evidence of 17th and 18th century tanning pits. In the late 18th century, the ground floor was divided and part of it was constructed with bricks and mortar. In another part of the building, a hearth area for a vat was built. In the mid-19th century, it was converted into two cottages with brick wall constructed to separate them. Additional supports for an upper floor were built and one of the ground floor windows was converted into a door. The western part of the building was used as a paint shop at this time. The building fell into disrepair during the 20th century and it was abandoned until it was rediscovered in 1976 as Gouda Way was being built. At some point a southern doorway and steps to a first floor hall were added as these were found when the site was excavated in 1983. Between 1913 and 1918 the area was used for vehicle repair, with the hall and cottages being gutted out and converted to garage buildings.

== Architecture ==
During the 12th and 13th centuries, most houses in Gloucester were built with timber-frames and as such were susceptible to damage by fire. However, Tanners Hall was one of the few structures at this time to be built entirely of stone, with parts of it having survived until the current day. It is now a ruin consisting of just three walls and some remnants of doors and windows. The building measures 10.3m from east to west and 5.25m from north to south. The west walls are 0.5m wide and the north wall is 1.5m wide. The tallest remaining wall is 3.7m high. The north wall is the most intact, with over half of it still standing. Some timber joists and lintels have stayed intact. In the centre of the north wall is a large rectangular opening with a concrete lintel that was created in the 20th century, which was likely to have been used as the garage entrance, and there is a further rectangular opening to the right. The east wall has been largely rebuilt but contains some original stonework. Part of the gabled west wall has been built upon with modern bricks. The south wall no longer exists above ground level as its remains were demolished in the 20th century.

== Excavations of the site ==
The first excavation in 1983 consisted of several trial trenches, which led to the finding of rectangular and circular tanning pits, evidence of the upper floor supports, and discovery of five phases of occupation ranging from a Romano-British road, that led to the Roman fort at Kingsholm, to mid-19th century domestic occupation. Construction works around the hall in the 1980s and 1990s resulted in several more excavations revealing more evidence of the Romano-British metalled road, the 11th and 12th century medieval activity and evidence of the tannery within the hall. In 2011, further excavations were undertaken in the immediate vicinity which revealed Roman, medieval and post-medieval artefacts including a medieval flag stoned floor, the foundations of a 15th or 16th century wall to the west of the hall and additional tanning pits to the south and east.

== Redevelopment of the site ==
In 2011, a scheme was approved to redevelop Tanners Hall and the surrounding land however, in 2014 it fell through due to the economic difficulties at this time. In 2018, planning permission was submitted to build a four storey apartment block on the site, this will consist of nineteen one-bedroom flats and five two-bedroom flats. The developers design includes conserving the existing ruin and using it to form the entrance area of the apartment block. It is proposed that information boards will be placed to describe the history of the hall. Conservation work will include the removal of the 20th century additions to the structure and the walls will be stabilised using conservation repair techniques. The planning application was approved in February 2019.

In January 2021 local housing association Gloucester City Homes (GCH) working with Cape Homes transformed the ruins into 24 flats for affordable rent. The building sensitively incorporates the standing walls and showcases the historic ruins.
