= Wotton, Gloucester =

Suburb of Gloucester, England

Coordinates: 51°52′5″N 2°13′39″W

Wotton
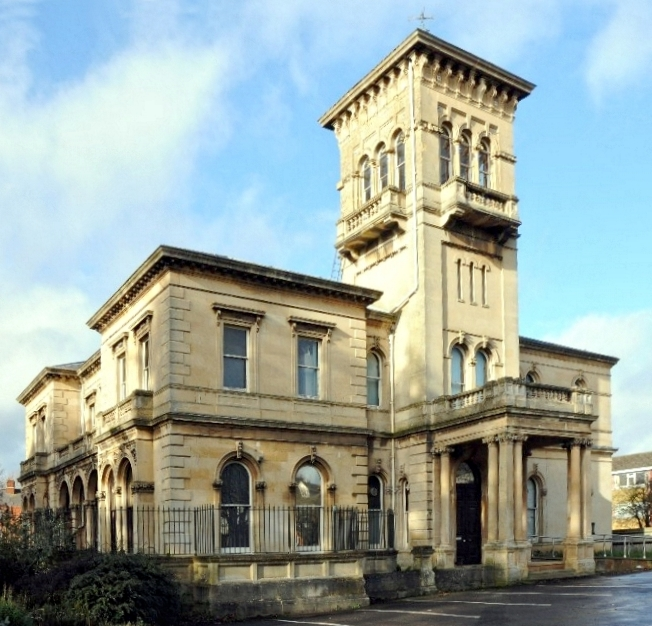
- Hillfield House

- Location within Gloucestershire
- District: Gloucester
- Shire county: Gloucestershire
- Region: South West
- Country: England
- Sovereign state: United Kingdom

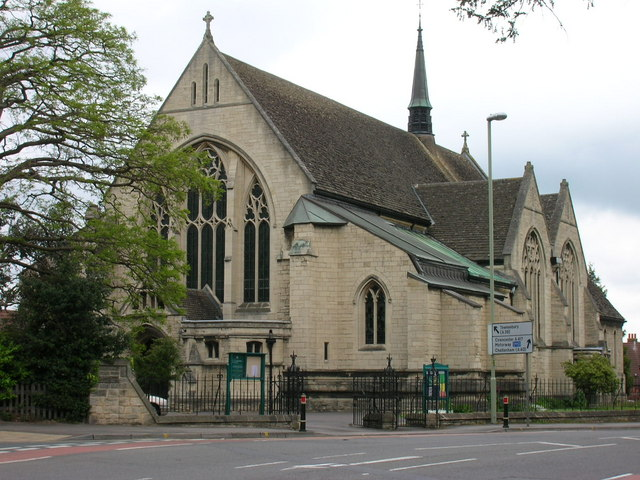
St Catherines, Wotton

Wotton is a suburb of Gloucester, in the county of Gloucestershire, England. It is situated close to the city centre (1 mile), the Royal Hospital, the city's railway station and to London Road. It is part of the electoral ward of Kingsholm and Wotton.

== History ==
The name "Wotton" means 'Wood farm/settlement', the "St Mary" part being from the church is dedicated to St. Mary de Lode. Wootton St. Mary was recorded in the Domesday Book as Cerletone.

In the Imperial Gazetteer of England and Wales (1870–72) John Marius Wilson described Wotton:

WOOTTON, [sic] a hamlet and a ville in St. Mary-de-Lode parish, Gloucestershire; adjacent to Gloucester city. Real property, £5,425. Pop. of the hamlet in 1851, 1,174; in 1861, 1,562,-of whom 578 were in the county lunatic asylum. Houses, 204. Pop. of the ville, in 1851, 56; in 1861, 91. Houses, 21.

Wotton St Mary became a parish in 1866 on 1 April 1966 the parish was abolished and became part of Barnwood, Barton St. Mary, Gloucester St. Catherine, Gloucester St. John the Baptist, Longford, Matson, South Hamlet, Wotton St. Mary Within and Wotton St. Mary Without.
