= 2015 Premiership Rugby Sevens Series =

Rugby competition

2015 Premiership Rugby 7s Series
- Countries: England; Wales
- Matches played: 34
- Tries scored: 232 (average 6.8 per match)

The 2015 Premiership Rugby Sevens Series was the sixth Rugby Union 7-a-side competition for the twelve 2015–16 Aviva Premiership Clubs, and the second including the four Welsh Regions that compete in the Pro12.

The pool stage of the tournament started on 15 August 2015, before continuing on 20–22 August 2015. The final took place on 28 August 2015.

== Format ==
The sixteen teams were split into four groups - A, B, C & D, based on geographical location. Each team in the group played each other once, to the World Rugby Laws of the Game - 7s Variations. Based on the result, teams received:

- 4 points for a win
- 2 points for a draw
- 1 bonus point for a loss by seven points or less
- 1 bonus point for scoring four or more tries in a match

Following all each group, the winner and runner up in each group progressed to the Final Stage. In the final, the 8 teams (4 Winners and 4 Runners up) were arranged into 4 quarter-final pairings. The winners of each match qualified for the Cup semi-finals, with the losers moving into a new Plate competition. Thereafter, competition was a simple knockout bracket, with the winner of the Cup final being declared the series winner.

== Group stage ==
Group A	Group B	Group C	Group D
Cardiff Blues 7s	Bath 7s	Harlequins 7s	Leicester Tigers 7s
Newport Gwent Dragons 7s	Exeter Chiefs 7s	Northampton Saints 7s	Newcastle Falcons 7s
Ospreys 7s	Gloucester 7s	Saracens 7s	Sale Sharks 7s
Scarlets 7s	London Irish 7s	Wasps 7s	Worcester Warriors 7s

=== Group A ===
Dates: Saturday August 15, 2015 Venue: BT Sport Cardiff Arms Park, Cardiff

The pool featured the Welsh Regions.

Pos	Team	Pld	W	D	L	F	A	TF	TA	TB	LB	Pts
1	Newport Gwent Dragons 7s	3	2	0	1	81	57	13	9	2	1	11
2	Scarlets 7s	3	2	0	1	62	41	10	7	2	1	11
3	Ospreys 7s	3	2	0	1	64	67	10	11	1	0	9
4	Cardiff Blues 7s	3	0	0	3	48	90	8	14	1	0	1
Green background is the pool winner and qualifies for the Final Stage. Blue background is the runner-up and also qualifies for the Final Stage. Updated 15 August 2015

15:15

Ospreys 7s	33-24	Cardiff Blues 7s
	Report

Referee: Craig Evans

15:40

Newport Gwent Dragons 7s	19-24	Scarlets 7s
	Report

Referee: Rhys Thomas

16:10

Newport Gwent Dragons 7s	31-14	Ospreys 7s
	Report

Referee: Gwyn Morris

16:35

Cardiff Blues 7s	5-26	Scarlets 7s
	Report

Referee: Rhys Thomas

17:05

Ospreys 7s	17-12	Scarlets 7s
	Report

Referee: Craig Evans

17:30

Cardiff Blues 7s	19-31	Newport Gwent Dragons 7s
	Report

Referee: Gwyn Morris

=== Group B ===
At Kingsholm, Gloucester on Thursday 20 August 2015.

Pos	Team	Pld	W	D	L	F	A	TF	TA	TB	LB	Pts
1	Gloucester Rugby 7s	3	3	0	0	91	19	15	3	3	0	15
2	Exeter Chiefs 7s	3	2	0	1	74	46	12	8	2	0	10
3	Bath Rugby 7s	3	1	0	2	43	50	7	8	1	0	5
4	London Irish 7s	3	0	0	3	7	100	1	16	0	0	0
Green background is the pool winner and qualifies for the Final Stage. Blue background is the runner-up and also qualifies for the Final Stage. Updated 15 August 2015

20 August 2015
19:15

Gloucester Rugby 7s	36-5	Exeter Chiefs 7s

Kingsholm

20 August 2015
19:40

Bath Rugby 7s	26-0	London Irish 7s

Kingsholm

20 August 2015
20:10

Bath Rugby 7s	10-26	Exeter Chiefs 7s

Kingsholm

20 August 2015
20:35

Gloucester Rugby 7s	31-7	London Irish 7s

Kingsholm

20 August 2015
21:05

Exeter Chiefs 7s	43-0	London Irish 7s

Kingsholm

20 August 2015
21:30

Gloucester Rugby 7s	24-7	Bath Rugby 7s

Kingsholm

=== Group C ===
At the Ricoh Arena, Coventry on Friday 21 August 2015.

Pos	Team	Pld	W	D	L	F	A	TF	TA	TB	LB	Pts
1	Wasps 7s	3	3	0	0	122	29	18	5	3	0	15
2	Harlequins 7s	3	1	0	2	57	76	9	12	1	1	6
3	Saracens 7s	3	1	0	2	46	81	8	13	1	0	5
4	Northampton Saints 7s	3	1	0	2	48	87	8	13	1	0	5
Green background is the pool winner and qualifies for the Final Stage. Blue background is the runner-up and also qualifies for the Final Stage. Updated 15 August 2015

21 August 2015
19:15

Wasps 7s	40-14	Harlequins 7s

Ricoh Arena

21 August 2015
19:40

Saracens 7s	12-31	Northampton Saints 7s

Ricoh Arena

21 August 2015
20:10

Saracens 7s	24-17	Harlequins 7s

Ricoh Arena

21 August 2015
20:35

Wasps 7s	49-5	Northampton Saints 7s

Ricoh Arena

21 August 2015
21:05

Harlequins 7s	26-12	Northampton Saints 7s

Ricoh Arena

21 August 2015
21:30

Wasps 7s	33-10	Saracens 7s

Ricoh Arena

=== Group D ===
At Kingston Park, Newcastle on Saturday 22 August 2015.

Pos	Team	Pld	W	D	L	F	A	TF	TA	TB	LB	Pts
1	Newcastle Falcons 7s	3	3	0	0	123	36	19	6	3	0	15
2	Sale Sharks 7s	3	1	1	1	71	57	11	9	1	0	7
3	Worcester Warriors 7s	3	1	1	1	58	64	10	10	1	0	7
4	Leicester Tigers 7s	3	0	0	3	22	117	4	19	0	0	0
Green background is the pool winner and qualifies for the Final Stage. Blue background is the runner-up and also qualifies for the Final Stage. Updated 15 August 2015

22 August 2015
16:00

Newcastle Falcons 7s	50-12	Leicester Tigers 7s

Darlington Arena

22 August 2015
16:25

Worcester Warriors 7s	19-19	Sale Sharks 7s

Darlington Arena

22 August 2015
16:55

Worcester Warriors 7s	27-5	Leicester Tigers 7s

Darlington Arena

22 August 2015
17:20

Newcastle Falcons 7s	33-12	Sale Sharks 7s

Darlington Arena

22 August 2015
17:50

Leicester Tigers 7s	5-40	Sale Sharks 7s

Darlington Arena

22 August 2015
18:15

Newcastle Falcons 7s	40-12	Worcester Warriors 7s

Darlington Arena

== Final stage ==
Finals day was played at the Twickenham Stoop on Friday 28 August 2015.

The four pool winners played a quarter-final against a runner up from another pool. The winner of these quarter finals would compete in the cup competition, while the losers would compete in the plate competition.

=== Quarter-finals ===
28 August 2015

Newport Gwent Dragons 7s	26-10	Sale Sharks 7s

Twickenham Stoop

28 August 2015

Gloucester Rugby 7s	31-26	Harlequins 7s

Twickenham Stoop

28 August 2015

Wasps 7s	33-5	Exeter Chiefs 7s

Twickenham Stoop

28 August 2015

Newcastle Falcons 7s	26-31	Scarlets 7s

Twickenham Stoop

=== Plate Competition ===
==== Plate Semi-finals ====
28 August 2015

Sale Sharks 7s	45-24	Harlequins 7s

Twickenham Stoop

28 August 2015

Exeter Chiefs 7s	14-12	Newcastle Falcons 7s

Twickenham Stoop

==== Plate Final ====
28 August 2015

Sale Sharks 7s	19-26	Exeter Chiefs 7s

Twickenham Stoop

=== Cup Competition ===
==== Cup Semi-finals ====
28 August 2015

Newport Gwent Dragons 7s	19-14	Gloucester Rugby 7s

Twickenham Stoop

28 August 2015

Wasps 7s	33-12	Scarlets 7s

Twickenham Stoop

==== Cup Final ====
28 August 2015

Newport Gwent Dragons 7s	17-14	Wasps 7s

Twickenham Stoop
