= 2010 Premiership Rugby Sevens Series =

2010 J.P Morgan Asset Management Premiership Rugby 7s Series
- Countries: England
- Champions: Saracens 7s (1st title)
- Runners-up: Newcastle Falcons 7s
- Matches played: 25
- Tries scored: 133 (average 5.3 per match)

The 2010 Premiership Rugby Sevens Series, (known for sponsorship reasons as the 2010 J.P Morgan Asset Management Premiership Rugby 7s Series) was the inaugural Rugby Union 7-a-side competition for the twelve 2010–11 Aviva Premiership Clubs. It took place during the months of July and August, was sponsored by J.P Morgan Asset Management, and the final was held at the Recreation Ground on 6 August 2010.

== Format ==
The twelve Premiership Clubs were split into three Groups – A, B and C – with each group playing on a consecutive Friday in July. Each team in the group played each other once, to the International Rugby Board Laws of the Game - 7s Variations. Based on the result, teams would receive:

- 4 points for a win
- 2 points for a draw
- 1 bonus point for a loss by seven points or less
- 1 bonus point for scoring four or more tries in a match

Following all the games, the winner and runner up in the group would progress to the final. In the final, the 6 teams (3 Winners and 3 Runners up) are split into 2 pools. Again teams play each other once and points are awarded based on the result. Following the culmination of this stage the winners of each pool progress to the final, the winner of that game being declared the champions.

== Group stage ==
Group A	Group B	Group C
Harlequins 7s	Leeds Carnegie 7s	Bath 7s
London Irish 7s	Leicester Tigers 7s	Exeter Chiefs 7s
Saracens 7s	Newcastle Falcons 7s	Gloucester 7s
London Wasps 7s	Sale Sharks 7s	Northampton Saints 7s

=== Group A ===
Played on Friday 16 July 2010 at The Stoop, Twickenham.

Pos	Team	Pld	W	D	L	PF	PA	PD	TF	TA	TB	LB	Pts	Qualification
1	Saracens 7s	3	3	0	0	69	15	+54	11	3	1	0	13	Final stage
2	Harlequins 7s	3	1	0	2	30	38	−8	8	6	1	1	6	Final stage
3	London Wasps 7s	3	1	0	2	41	46	−5	7	8	1	0	5	
4	London Irish 7s	3	1	0	2	24	65	−41	4	13	0	0	4	

Source: Premiership Rugby

16 July 2010
19:30

Harlequins 7s	15 – 5	London Wasps 7s

The Stoop

16 July 2010
19:55

Saracens 7s	29 – 0	London Irish 7s

The Stoop

16 July 2010
20:25

Saracens 7s	21 – 5	Harlequins 7s

The Stoop

16 July 2010
20:50

London Wasps 7s	26 – 12	London Irish 7s

The Stoop

16 July 2010
21:20

Harlequins 7s	10 – 12	London Irish 7s

The Stoop

16 July 2010
21:45

Saracens 7s	19 – 10	London Wasps 7s

The Stoop

=== Group B ===
Played on Friday 23 July 2010 at Welford Road, Leicester.

Pos	Team	Pld	W	D	L	PF	PA	PD	TF	TA	TB	LB	Pts	Qualification
1	Newcastle Falcons 7s	3	3	0	0	53	31	+22	9	5	0	0	12	Final stage
2	Sale Sharks 7s	3	2	0	1	78	36	+42	12	6	2	1	11	Final stage
3	Leeds Carnegie 7s	3	1	0	2	52	74	−22	8	12	1	1	6	
4	Leicester Tigers 7s	3	0	0	3	43	85	−42	7	13	1	1	2	

Source: Premiership Rugby

23 July 2010
19:30

Sale Sharks 7s	33 – 7	Leeds Carnegie 7s

Welford Road

23 July 2010
19:55

Newcastle Falcons 7s	19 – 7	Leicester Tigers 7s

Welford Road

23 July 2010
20:25

Newcastle Falcons 7s	19 – 12	Sale Sharks 7s

Welford Road

23 July 2010
20:50

Leeds Carnegie 7s	33 – 26	Leicester Tigers 7s

Welford Road

23 July 2010
21:20

Sale Sharks 7s	33 – 10	Leicester Tigers 7s

Welford Road

23 July 2010
21:45

Newcastle Falcons 7s	15 – 12	Leeds Carnegie 7s

Welford Road

=== Group C ===
Played on Friday 30 July 2010 at Franklin's Gardens, Northampton.

Pos	Team	Pld	W	D	L	PF	PA	PD	TF	TA	TB	LB	Pts	Qualification
1	Northampton Saints 7s	3	3	0	0	53	29	+24	9	5	0	0	12	Final stage
2	Exeter Chiefs 7s	3	2	0	1	53	36	+17	9	6	1	1	10	Final stage
3	Gloucester 7s	3	1	0	2	73	34	+39	11	6	1	2	7	
4	Bath 7s	3	0	0	3	12	92	−80	2	14	0	0	0	

Source: Premiership Rugby

30 July 2010
19:30

Gloucester 7s	12 – 17	Northampton Saints 7s

Franklin's Gardens

30 July 2010
19:55

Exeter Chiefs 7s	26 – 5	Bath 7s

Franklin's Gardens

30 July 2010
20:25

Exeter Chiefs 7s	17 – 14	Gloucester 7s

Franklin's Gardens

30 July 2010
20:50

Northampton Saints 7s	19 – 7	Bath 7s

Franklin's Gardens

30 July 2010
21:20

Gloucester 7s	47 – 0	Bath 7s

Franklin's Gardens

30 July 2010
21:45

Exeter Chiefs 7s	10 – 17	Northampton Saints 7s

Franklin's Gardens

== Final stage ==
The final was held at The Recreation Ground, Bath on Friday 6 August 2010.

=== Pool A ===
Pos	Team	Pld	W	D	L	PF	PA	PD	TF	TA	TB	LB	Pts	Qualification
1	Saracens 7s	2	2	0	0	41	15	+26	7	3	1	0	9	Final
2	Northampton Saints 7s	2	1	0	1	32	34	−2	6	6	1	1	6	
3	Sale Sharks 7s	2	0	0	2	22	46	−24	4	8	0	1	1	

Source: Premiership Rugby

6 August 2010
19:00

Saracens 7s	24 – 5	Sale Sharks 7s

Recreation Ground

6 August 2010
19:50

Sale Sharks 7s	17 – 22	Northampton Saints 7s

Recreation Ground

6 August 2010
20:40

Saracens 7s	17 – 10	Northampton Saints 7s

Recreation Ground

=== Pool B ===
Pos	Team	Pld	W	D	L	PF	PA	PD	TF	TA	TB	LB	Pts	Qualification
1	Newcastle Falcons 7s	2	1	1	0	36	29	+7	6	5	1	0	7	Final
2	Harlequins 7s	2	1	0	1	36	31	+5	6	5	0	1	5	
3	Exeter Chiefs 7s	2	0	1	1	15	27	−12	3	5	0	0	2	

Source: Premiership Rugby

6 August 2010
19:25

Harlequins 7s	19 – 26	Newcastle Falcons 7s

Recreation Ground

6 August 2010
20:15

Newcastle Falcons 7s	10 – 10	Exeter Chiefs 7s

Recreation Ground

6 August 2010
21:05

Harlequins 7s	17 – 5	Exeter Chiefs 7s

Recreation Ground

=== Final ===
Newcastle Falcons 7s and Saracens 7s won their respective pools and therefore played in the final of the 2010 Premiership Rugby Sevens Series.

6 August 2010
21:40

Saracens 7s	17 – 5	Newcastle Falcons 7s

Recreation Ground

- Saracens 7s won the 2010 Premiership Rugby Sevens Series.
