= 2014 World Club 7s =

- Host nation: England
- Date: 16-17 August 2014

Cup
- Champion: (Argentina) Buenos Aires
- Runner-up: (New Zealand) Auckland Blues
- Third: (Russia) Kuban Krasnodar

Plate
- Winner: (Wales) Cardiff Blues
- Runner-up: (South Africa) Blue Bulls

Shield
- Winner: (United States) Seattle
- Runner-up: (England) Harlequins

Tournament details
- Matches played: 34

The 2014 World Club 7s was the second World Club 7s tournament, a rugby sevens competition organised by Premiership Rugby. It was hosted at Twickenham Stadium on 16 and 17 August 2014. The tournament was won by Buenos Aires.

== Format ==
11 teams have been invited, and one has qualified for the competition through the 2014 Premiership Rugby Sevens Series contested by English and Welsh clubs.

The 12 teams are split into 3 pools of 4 teams, and each team will play all the others in their pool once on day one. Matches will be played according to International Rugby Board Laws of the Game - 7s Variations, and based on the result, teams will receive league points.

Following the completion of the pool stage, teams will be seeded based on league points and position in their respective pools. The top two teams from each pool, and the two best third place teams, will contest the cup competition. The remaining four teams will contest the shield competition.

These competitions take place on day two as knock-out competitions, with the winners progressing to the next stage at each round. However, the losers of the cup quarter-finals will instead drop down to contest a plate knock-out competition.

== Teams ==
Team	Nation
Auckland	New Zealand
Vodacom Blue Bulls	South Africa
Buenos Aires	Argentina
Cardiff Blues	Wales
DHL Western Province	South Africa
Gloucester Rugby	England
Harlequins	England
Kuban Krasnodar	Russia
New York	USA
Enisei-STM	Russia
Seattle	USA
Waratahs	Australia

== Pool Stage ==
=== Pool A ===
Teams	Pld	W	D	L	PF	PA	Diff	Pts
(South Africa) DHL Western Province	3	2	1	0	99	69	30	8
(Russia) RC Enisei	3	2	0	1	83	64	19	7
(United States) New York	3	1	1	1	67	59	8	6
(England) Harlequins	3	0	0	3	38	95	-57	3

16 August 2014
11:30

RC Enisei (Russia)	26 - 17	(United States) New York

Twickenham Stadium, London

16 August 2014
11:53

Harlequins (England)	19 - 38	(South Africa) DHL Western Province

Twickenham Stadium, London

16 August 2014
14:15

RC Enisei (Russia)	33 - 12	(England) Harlequins

Twickenham Stadium, London

16 August 2014
14:38

New York (United States)	26 - 26	(South Africa) DHL Western Province

Twickenham Stadium, London

16 August 2014
16:37

RC Enisei (Russia)	24 - 35	(South Africa) DHL Western Province

Twickenham Stadium, London

16 August 2014
17:00

New York (United States)	24 - 7	(England) Harlequins

Twickenham Stadium, London

=== Pool B ===
Teams	Pld	W	D	L	PF	PA	Diff	Pts
(Argentina) Buenos Aires	3	3	0	0	92	31	61	9
(South Africa) Vodacom Blue Bulls	3	2	0	1	67	61	6	7
(Wales) Cardiff Blues	3	1	0	2	76	62	14	5
(England) Gloucester Rugby	3	0	0	3	29	110	-81	3

16 August 2014
12:16

Gloucester Rugby (England)	14 - 36	(South Africa) Vodacom Blue Bulls

Twickenham Stadium, London

16 August 2014
12:39

Cardiff Blues (Wales)	14 - 33	(Argentina) Buenos Aires

Twickenham Stadium, London

16 August 2014
15:05

Gloucester (England)	5 - 41	(Wales) Cardiff Blues

Twickenham Stadium, London

16 August 2014
15:28

Vodacom Blue Bulls (South Africa)	7 - 26	(Argentina) Buenos Aires

Twickenham Stadium, London

16 August 2014
17:23

Gloucester (England)	10 - 33	(Argentina) Buenos Aires

Twickenham Stadium, London

16 August 2014
17:46

Vodacom Blue Bulls (South Africa)	24 - 21	(Wales) Cardiff Blues

Twickenham Stadium, London

=== Pool C ===
Teams	Pld	W	D	L	PF	PA	Diff	Pts
(New Zealand) Auckland	3	3	0	0	74	39	35	9
(Russia) Kuban Krasnodar	3	2	0	1	60	45	15	7
(United States) Seattle	3	1	0	2	50	50	0	5
(Australia) NSW Waratahs	3	0	0	3	45	95	-50	3

16 August 2014
13:02

Kuban Krasnodar (Russia)	15 - 21	(New Zealand) Auckland

Twickenham Stadium, London

16 August 2014
13:25

NSW Waratahs (Australia)	14 - 33	(United States) Seattle

Twickenham Stadium, London

16 August 2014
15:51

Kuban Krasnodar (Russia)	28 - 19	(Australia) NSW Waratahs

Twickenham Stadium, London

16 August 2014
16:14

Auckland (New Zealand)	19 - 12	(United States) Seattle

Twickenham Stadium, London

16 August 2014
18:09

Kuban Krasnodar (Russia)	17 - 5	(United States) Seattle

Twickenham Stadium, London

16 August 2014
18:32

Auckland (New Zealand)	34 - 12	(Australia) NSW Waratahs

Twickenham Stadium, London

== Knock-out Competition ==
=== Shield (Places 9-12) ===
==== Shield Semi-finals ====
17 August 2014
11:30

NSW Waratahs (Australia)	19 - 26	(England) Harlequins
	(Shield SF 1)

Twickenham Stadium, London

17 August 2014
11:52

Seattle (United States)	22 - 12	(England) Gloucester
	(Shield SF 2)

Twickenham Stadium, London

==== Eleventh/Twelfth Place play-off ====
17 August 2014
13:47

NSW Waratahs (Australia)	17 - 22	(England) Gloucester

Twickenham Stadium, London

==== Shield Final ====
17 August 2014
14:10

Harlequins (England)	14 - 28	(United States) Seattle

Twickenham Stadium, London

=== Cup Quarter-finals ===
17 August 2014
12:15

Buenos Aires (Argentina)	7 - 5	(Wales) Cardiff Blues
	(QF 1)

Twickenham Stadium, London

17 August 2014
12:38

RC Enisei (Russia)	12 - 19	(Russia) Kuban Krasnodar
	(QF 2)

Twickenham Stadium, London

17 August 2014
13:01

Auckland (New Zealand)	36 - 5	(United States) New York
	(QF 3)

Twickenham Stadium, London

17 August 2014
13:24

DHL Western Province (South Africa)	22 - 12	(South Africa) Vodacom Blue Bulls
	(QF 4)

Twickenham Stadium, London

=== Plate Competition (Places 5-8) ===
==== Plate Semi-finals ====
17 August 2014
14:56

Cardiff Blues (Wales)	35 - 5	(Russia) RC Enisei
	(Plate SF 1)

Twickenham Stadium, London

17 August 2014
15:19

New York (United States)	14 - 31	(South Africa) Vodacom Blue Bulls
	(Plate SF 2)

Twickenham Stadium, London

==== Seventh/Eighth Place play-off ====
17 August 2014
16:28

RC Enisei (Russia)	7 - 34	(United States) New York

Twickenham Stadium, London

==== Plate Final ====
17 August 2014
16:51

Cardiff Blues (Wales)	28 - 12	(South Africa) Vodacom Blue Bulls

Twickenham Stadium, London

=== Cup Competition ===
==== Cup Semi-finals ====
17 August 2014
15:42

Buenos Aires (Argentina)	35 - 12	(Russia) Kuban Krasnodar
	(Cup SF 1)

Twickenham Stadium, London

17 August 2014
16:05

Auckland (New Zealand)	19 - 14	(South Africa) DHL Western Province
	(Cup SF 2)

Twickenham Stadium, London

==== Third Place play-off ====
17 August 2014
17:14

Kuban Krasnodar (Russia)	22 - 19	(South Africa) DHL Western Province

Twickenham Stadium, London

==== Cup Final ====
17 August 2014
17:37

Buenos Aires (Argentina)	26 - 22	(New Zealand) Auckland

Twickenham Stadium, London
