= James Lewis (rugby union) =

Welsh rugby union footballer

- Born: James Lewis; 20 November 1987 (age 38) Abergavenny, Wales
- Height: 1.88 m (6 ft 2 in)
- Weight: 93 kg (14 st 9 lb)

Rugby union career
- Position: Centre
Senior career
Years	Team	Apps	(Points)
2005-2006	Ebbw Vale RFC	4	(0)
2006-2007	Bedwas RFC	21	(45)
2007-2009	Ebbw Vale RFC	43	(65)
2009-2010	Coventry RFC	26	(20)
2010	Sale Sharks		
2010-2011	Cardiff RFC	9	(20)
2010-2017	London Welsh	111	(115)
2017-	Ebbw Vale RFC		
- Correct as of 19:53, 11 February 2008 (UTC)
Provincial / State sides
Years	Team	Apps	(Points)
2006-2009	Newport Gwent Dragons	1	(0)
- Correct as of 19:53, 11 February 2008 (UTC)
International career
Years	Team	Apps	(Points)
2003-2004	Wales U16	3	
2004-2005	Wales U19	2	
2005-2006	Wales U19	9	
2006-2007	Wales U20	4	
National sevens team
Years	Team		Comps
2006-2009	Wales Sevens		14

James Lewis (20 November 1987) is a Welsh rugby union player for London Welsh RFC. A centre, he previously played for Ebbw Vale, the Newport Gwent Dragons and Coventry. In 2010 he had a trial with Sale Sharks.

The twin brother of scrum-half Robert Lewis, James Lewis has represented Wales at U16, U18, U19, U20 and at Sevens. He scored an outstanding try in Wales U19's win over France U19's in the 2005-06 Grand Slam decider – and played a part in the newly created team's Six Nations Under 20s Championship in 2007. He has represented Wales on 18 occasions across all the age grade international teams.

Lewis was selected for the senior Wales Sevens squad at 19 years of age for the tour to the Hong Kong Sevens and the Adelaide Sevens for legs five and six of the 2006–07 IRB Sevens World Series. He scored a try in the Plate quarter-final clash against Italy in Hong Kong; his team ultimately won the trophy by overcoming Argentina in the final.

He was the only player to represent Wales in all of the 2007–08 IRB Sevens World Series, and the three Rugby World Cup Sevens qualifying games. He scored a try in the Bowl semi-final in the Dubai Sevens against Australia (which Wales narrowly lost), and further impressed in the George Sevens; he notched a match-winning try against France in the Bowl semi-final to put his side through to the final against England, in which he also scored to gain Wales Sevens' first piece of silverware in the 2007–08 season.

In 2007-08 he was Wales and Europe's highest try scorer in the IRB World Sevens Series and the 13th highest try scorer in the World 7's with 20 tries. Lewis has accumulated 34 tries for the Wales Sevens in all tournaments.

He was one of only 5 players (his twin brother Robert was another) who were part of the London Welsh squads that won the Greene King IPA Championship in 2011-2012 and again in 2013-2014 and he played throughout both the club's seasons in the Aviva Premiership. In season 2015 - 2016 he scored a hat-trick of tries to help London Welsh beat Yorkshire Carnegie 33 - 10 at Headingley in April to win the British & Irish Cup and was awarded Man of the Match. In the final game of the season against Doncaster he made his 100th appearance for the club.

Following the unfortunate financial situation at London Welsh and its loss of a licence to continue to play in the RFU Greene King Championship, James returned to Ebbw Vale RFC in January 2017.

In 2023 James was unsuccessful in his attempt to become a Gladiator on BBC's new series of Gladiators. Speaking to fans after hearing the news he claimed to be committed to winning a place on the show. It was rumored he will perform under the name "Dragon".
