= Steve Hayes (businessman) =

English businessman

Steve Hayes is an English businessman, and was the owner of Aviva Premiership rugby union side London Wasps.

== Business career ==
Originally a double glazing salesman, Hayes also worked for his father-in-law selling secondary mortgages.

In 1997 with David Cowham he founded loans.co.uk, a Watford headquartered finance broker. Hayes became Chief Executive, expanding the firm to become the UK's then leading finance broker, on an earnings package of £5.5million in 2004/2005. In June 2005, Cowham and Hayes sold loans.co.uk to MBNA for an undisclosed amount, reported to be worth £50million to each partner.

== Club ownership ==
=== Wycombe Wanderers ===
Hayes became a 25% shareholder in Wycombe Wanderers through an initial £250,000 investment in June 2004, when the football club became a plc. He later became managing director.

In July 2009, following a shareholders' meeting, he took full ownership of Wycombe Wanderers, in the process writing off £3m of the club's debt to him in exchange for shares. In June 2012 the Wycombe Wanderers Trust bought the club from Steve Hayes.

=== London Wasps ===
Hayes bought an 11.6% stake in London Wasps Holdings Ltd in August 2007, and became chairman of Lawrence Dallaglio's benefit committee. In December 2008, Hayes bought Chrysalis Records founder Chris Wright's controlling interest and John O'Connell's shareholding in London Wasps to take complete control.

In June 2012, a consortium led by former London Wasps player Ken Moss purchased the rugby club from Hayes.
