= Premiership Rugby Sevens Series =

Iendly Rugby Sevens competition

Premiership Rugby 7s Series
- Current season or competition: 2019 Premiership Rugby Sevens Series
- Competition logo
- Sport: Rugby sevens
- Inaugural season: 2010
- Ceased: 2020
- Number of teams: 12
- Country: England; Wales (between 2014–2016)
- Holders: Saracens 7s (2019)
- Most titles: Saracens 7s (3 titles)
- Website: Premiership Rugby 7s
- Broadcast partner: ESPN UK (2010–12); TNT Sports (2013–)
- Related competition: World Club 7s

The Premiership Rugby Sevens Series was a friendly Rugby Sevens competition for the twelve Premiership Rugby clubs that will play the following season (i.e. the 2010 competition features the teams playing in the Aviva Premiership in the 2010–11 season). It was started in 2010, as an off-season competition, held during the months of July and August. Between 2014 and 2016 the competition included the four Welsh regions which compete in the Pro14.

== Format ==
All the games are played according to the International Rugby Board Laws of the Game – 7s Variations.

=== Pool phase ===
Originally, the twelve Premiership clubs were split into three pools, each playing on three consecutive Friday nights, on one of the teams grounds. Following expansion, the four Welsh regions compete in their own pool.

Teams play on a round-robin format and are awarded points based on the results of the matches. Teams are awarded:

- 4 points for a win
- 2 points for a draw
- 1 bonus point for a loss by seven points or less
- 1 bonus point for scoring four or more tries in a match

Following the completion of all the matches in a pool, both the winner and runner-up progress to the final.

=== Final ===
==== 2010 – 2013 ====
For the final, the final six teams were split into two pools. The teams again play each other on a round-robin basis, receiving points in the same manner as in the pool stage. After the pool stage of the final, the respective winners of the pools play each other in the grand final, the winner of that game being declared the winner of the competition.

==== 2014 – 2016 ====
Following the expansion to include the Welsh regions, the format of the finals was changed.

Eight teams contested the quarter-finals, and the format resembled a traditional sevens final day, with the losers of the quarter-finals contesting a plate competition, and the winners a cup competition. The winner of the cup competition is the series winner.

==== 2017 – present ====
For 2017 a new format was introduced with the four Welsh regions no longer taking part and all matches taking place in one venue over two days. The 12 Premiership Rugby teams were split into four pools of three with all group matches taking place on the first day and the competition splitting into bowl, plate and cup tournaments on the second day. Franklin's Gardens was selected as the venue for the inaugural edition of the new format.

In 2018 and 2019 the venue and format remained similar, however the bowl tournament was not contested.

== Broadcast ==
Initially, each event in the competition was broadcast live on ESPN. Highlights were shown on ITV4 the following Sunday.

On 25 February 2013, BT announced that it had acquired ESPN's UK channels and their sports broadcasting rights. The 2013 edition of the competition, including the final, was broadcast live on the new BT Sport channel. The channel was launched on Thursday 1 August, the first day of the competition. Highlights of the 2013 competition were shown on STV in Scotland. In 2014, Welsh language channel S4C broadcast the first round of the tournament (containing the four regions) live.

Since 2017, highlights have been broadcast on Channel 5.

== History ==
=== Finals ===
Year	Winner	Score	Runner-up	Venue
2010	Saracens 7s	17–5	Newcastle Falcons 7s	Recreation Ground, Bath
2011	Newcastle Falcons 7s	31–21	Saracens 7s	The Stoop, Twickenham
2012	London Irish 7s	31–28	Gloucester 7s	Recreation Ground, Bath
2013	Gloucester 7s	24–17	Leicester Tigers 7s	Recreation Ground, Bath
2014	Gloucester 7s	12–5	Newport Gwent Dragons 7s	The Stoop, Twickenham
2015	Newport Gwent Dragons 7s	17–14	Wasps 7s	The Stoop, Twickenham
2016	Wasps 7s	31–28	Exeter 7s	Ricoh Arena, Coventry
2017	Wasps 7s	31–12	Newcastle Falcons 7s	Franklin's Gardens, Northampton
2018	Saracens 7s	33–12	Wasps 7s	Franklin's Gardens, Northampton
2019	Saracens 7s	35–19	Wasps 7s	Franklin's Gardens, Northampton

=== 2010 ===
The 2010 Premiership Rugby Sevens Series was the inaugural edition of the competition. It began on Friday 16 July and lasted four weeks, with the final at the Recreation Ground on Friday 6 August.

Saracens 7s and Harlequins 7s qualified from group A, played at The Stoop on Friday 16 July; Newcastle Falcons 7s and Sale Sharks 7s qualified from group B, played at Welford Road on Friday 23 July; and Northampton Saints 7s and Exeter Chiefs 7s qualified from group C, played at Franklin's Gardens on Friday 30 July.

The finals were played at the Recreation Ground on Friday 6 August. The six teams were split into two pools of three teams. The winner of pool B, Newcastle Falcons 7s, were defeated 17 – 5 by the pool A winner, Saracens 7s in the final.

=== 2011 ===
The 2011 Premiership Rugby Sevens Series was the second edition of the competition. It began on Friday 15 July and lasted four weeks, with the final at The Stoop on Friday 5 August.

Harlequins 7s and Bath 7s qualified from group A, played at Recreation Ground on Friday 15 July; Saracens 7s and London Wasps 7s qualified from group B, played at Franklin's Gardens on Friday 22 July; and Newcastle Falcons 7s and Sale Sharks 7s qualified from group C, played at Edgeley Park on Friday 29 July.

The finals were played at The Stoop on Friday 5 August. The six teams were split into two pools of three teams The winner of pool B, Saracens 7s, were defeated 21 – 31 by the pool A winner, Newcastle Falcons 7s in the final.

=== 2012 ===
The 2012 Premiership Rugby Sevens Series was the third edition of the competition. It began on Friday 13 July and lasted four weeks, with the final at The Recreation Ground on Friday 3 August.

Saracens 7s and London Irish 7s qualified from group A, played at The Stoop on Friday 13 July; London Welsh 7s and Sale Sharks 7s qualified from group B, played at Edgeley Park on Friday 20 July; and Gloucester 7s and Bath 7s qualified from group C, played at Kingsholm on Thursday 26 July.

The finals were played at The Recreation Ground on Friday 3 August. The six teams were split into two pools of three teams The winner of pool A, Gloucester 7s, were defeated 28 – 31 by the pool B winner, London Irish 7s in the final.

=== 2013 ===
The 2013 Premiership Rugby Sevens Series was the fourth edition of the competition. The group stages ran on 1–3 August 2013 and the final at The Recreation Ground on 9 August 2013.

Worcester Warriors 7s and Gloucester 7s qualified from group A, played at Kingsholm on Thursday 1 August; Newcastle Falcons 7s and Leicester Tigers 7s qualified from group B, played at Franklin's Gardens on Friday 2 August; and Harlequins 7s and Saracens 7s qualified from group C, played at Allianz Park on Saturday 3 August.

The finals were played at The Recreation Ground on Friday 9 August. The six teams were split into two pools of three teams. The winner of pool A, Leicester Tigers 7s, were defeated 24 – 17 by the pool B winner, Gloucester 7s in the final.

=== 2014 ===
The 2014 Premiership Rugby Sevens Series was the fifth edition of the competition, and the first to include the Welsh regions. The group stages ran on 26 July 31 July – 2 August 2014 and the final at The Stoop, Twickenham on 8 August 2014.

Cardiff Blues 7s and Newport Gwent Dragons 7s qualified from group A, played at Cardiff Arms Park on Friday 26 July. Gloucester 7s and London Irish 7s qualified from group B, played at Kingsholm on Thursday 31 July. Harlequins 7s and Northampton Saints 7s qualified from group C, played at Franklin's Gardens on Friday 1 August; and Newcastle Falcons 7s and Leicester Tigers 7s qualified from group D, played at The Darlington Arena on Saturday 2 August.

The finals were played at The Stoop on Friday 8 August. The eight teams contested a more traditional sevens style finals competition, consisting of quarter-finals, followed by a plate and cup competition. Newport Gwent Dragons 7s were defeated 12 – 5 by Gloucester 7s in the cup final. This was the first time a team has won successive series finals.

=== 2015 ===
The 2015 Premiership Rugby Sevens Series was the sixth edition of the competition. The group stages ran on 15 August 20 – 22 August 2015 and the final at The Stoop, Twickenham on 28 August 2015.

Newport Gwent Dragons 7s and Scarlets 7s qualified from group A, played at Cardiff Arms Park on Saturday 15 August. Gloucester 7s and Exeter Chiefs 7s qualified from group B, played at Kingsholm on Thursday 20 August. Wasps 7s and Harlequins 7s qualified from group C, played at the Ricoh Arena, Coventry on Friday 21 August; and Newcastle Falcons 7s and Sale Sharks 7s qualified from group D, played at Kingston Park, Newcastle on Saturday 22 August.

The finals were played at The Stoop on Friday 28 August. The eight teams contested a finals competition consisting of quarter-finals, followed by a plate and cup competition. Wasps 7s were defeated 17 – 14 by Newport Gwent Dragons 7s in the cup final. This was the first time the tournament was won by a Welsh team.

=== Sponsorship ===
- J.P. Morgan Asset Management Premiership Rugby 7s Series: 2010–13
- Premiership Rugby 7s Series: 2014
- Singha Premiership Rugby 7s Series: 2015–17
