= 2019 Premiership Rugby Sevens Series =

2019 Premiership Rugby 7s Series
- Countries: England
- Champions: Saracens 7s
- Runners-up: Wasps 7s
- Matches played: 22

The 2019 Premiership Rugby Sevens Series was the ninth rugby union sevens competition for the twelve clubs who compete in the 2019–20 Premiership Rugby clubs. It was also the third to feature the new format in which all twelve Premiership Rugby teams feature together in one venue over two days.

The competition was held at Franklin's Gardens, Northampton for the third successive year on 13 and 14 September 2019.

== Format ==
The twelve teams were split into four groups – A, B, C & D. Each team in the group played each other once, to World Rugby Laws of the Game – 7s Variations.
Based on the result, teams received:

- 4 points for a win
- 2 points for a draw
- 1 bonus point for a loss by seven points or less
- 1 bonus point for scoring four or more tries in a match

Following all matches in each group, the winner and runner-up in each group progressed to the quarter-finals. The winners of each quarter-final qualified for the cup semi-finals, with the losers eliminated. Thereafter, competition was a simple knockout bracket, with the winner of the cup final being declared the series winner. The third placed team in each pool compete in the plate competition.

== Group stage ==
Group A	Group B	Group C	Group D
Sale Sharks 7s	Bath Rugby 7s	Bristol Bears 7s	Exeter Chiefs 7s
Saracens 7s	Leicester Tigers 7s	Harlequins 7s	Gloucester Rugby 7s
Worcester Warriors 7s	Wasps 7s	Northampton Saints 7s	London Irish 7s

Date: Friday, 13 September 2019

=== Group A ===
Pos	Team	Pld	W	D	L	F	A	PD	TF	TA	TB	LB	Pts
1	Saracens 7s	2	2	0	0	50	24	26	8	4	2	0	10
2	Worcester Warriors 7s	2	1	0	1	34	33	1	6	7	1	0	5
3	Sale Sharks 7s	2	0	0	2	32	44	-12	5	8	0	1	1
Green background progresses to the quarter-finals and may progress to cup. White background will compete in plate competition. Updated 16 July 2019 — source: Premiership Rugby

13 September 2019
18:15

Worcester Warriors 7s	22–21	Sale Sharks 7s

Franklin's Gardens

13 September 2019
19:45

Saracens 7s	22–12	Sale Sharks 7s

Franklin's Gardens

13 September 2019
21:15

Worcester Warriors 7s	12–28	Saracens 7s

Franklin's Gardens

=== Group B ===
Pos	Team	Pld	W	D	L	F	A	PD	TF	TA	TB	LB	Pts
1	Wasps 7s	2	2	0	0	98	10	88	15	2	2	0	10
2	Leicester Tigers 7s	2	1	0	1	29	67	-38	4	10	1	0	5
3	Bath Rugby 7s	2	0	0	2	24	74	-50	4	12	0	1	1
Green background progresses to the quarter-finals and may progress to cup. White background will compete in plate competition. Updated 16 July 2019 — source: Premiership Rugby

13 September 2019
17:53

Bath Rugby	5–50	Wasps 7s

Franklin's Gardens

13 September 2019
19:23

Wasps 7s	48–5	Leicester Tigers 7s

Franklin's Gardens

13 September 2019
20:53

Bath Rugby 7s	19–24	Leicester Tigers 7s

Franklin's Gardens

=== Group C ===
Pos	Team	Pld	W	D	L	F	A	PD	TF	TA	TB	LB	Pts
1	Bristol Bears 7s	2	2	0	0	54	46	8	8	8	0	2	10
2	Harlequins 7s	2	1	0	1	53	28	25	9	4	2	1	7
3	Northampton Saints 7s	2	0	0	2	24	55	-31	9	4	1	1	2
Green background progresses to the quarter-finals and may progress to cup. White background will compete in plate competition. Updated 16 July 2019 — source: Premiership Rugby

13 September 2019
18:38

Bristol Bears 7s	26–24	Northampton Saints 7s

Franklin's Gardens

13 September 2019
20:08

Harlequins 7s	22–28	Bristol Bears 7s

Franklin's Gardens

13 September 2019
21:38

Harlequins 7s	29–0	Northampton Saints 7s

Franklin's Gardens

=== Group D ===
Pos	Team	Pld	W	D	L	F	A	PD	TF	TA	TB	LB	Pts
1	Exeter Chiefs 7s	2	2	0	0	63	10	53	11	2	2	0	10
2	London Irish 7s	2	1	0	1	37	53	-16	7	9	1	0	5
3	Gloucester Rugby 7s	2	0	0	2	19	58	-39	3	7	0	0	0
Green background progresses to the quarter-finals and may progress to cup. White background will compete in plate competition. Updated 16 July 2019 — source: Premiership Rugby

13 September 2019
17:30

London Irish 7s	27–19	Gloucester Rugby 7s

Franklin's Gardens

13 September 2019
19:00

Exeter Chiefs 7s	32–10	London Irish 7s

Franklin's Gardens

13 September 2019
20:30

Exeter Chiefs 7s	31–0	Gloucester Rugby 7s

Franklin's Gardens

== Finals stage ==
Finals day was played on Saturday, 14 September 2019.

The four pool winners played a quarter-final against the runners-up in a 1 v 8, 2 v 7, 3 v 6 4 v 5 format. The winner of these quarter-finals competed in the cup competition, while the losers were eliminated. The third placed team in each pool competed in the plate competition.

=== Quarter-finals ===
14 September 2019
14:30

Wasps 7s (1)	26-20	(8) Leicester Tigers 7s

Franklin's Gardens

14 September 2019
14:53

Bristol Bears (4)	21-10	(5) Harlequins 7s

Franklin's Gardens

14 September 2019
15:15

Saracens 7s (3)	24-14	(6) London Irish 7s

Franklin's Gardens

14 September 2019
15:38

Exeter Chiefs 7s (2)	31-26	(7) Worcester Warriors 7s

Franklin's Gardens

=== Plate competition ===
==== Plate semi-finals ====
14 September
16:00

Northampton Saints 7s	28-31	Gloucester Rugby 7s

Franklin's Gardens

14 September
16:23

Sale Sharks 7s	29-22	Bath Rugby 7s

Franklin's Gardens

==== Plate final ====
14 September 2019
17:40

Gloucester Rugby 7s	34-29	Sale Sharks 7s

Franklin's Gardens

=== Cup competition ===
==== Semi-finals ====
14 September 2019
16:45

Wasps 7s	54-12	Bristol Bears 7s

Franklin's Gardens

14 September 2019
17:08

Saracens 7s	31-0	Exeter Chiefs 7s

Franklin's Gardens

==== Final ====
14 September
18:18

Wasps 7s	19-35	Saracens 7s

Franklin's Gardens
