= 2017 Premiership Rugby Sevens Series =

2017 Singha Premiership Rugby 7s Series
- Countries: England
- Champions: Wasps 7s
- Runners-up: Newcastle Falcons 7s
- Matches played: 25

The 2017 Premiership Rugby Sevens Series was the eighth rugby union 7-a-side competition for the twelve 2017–18 Aviva Premiership clubs, and the first to exclude the four Welsh Regions which compete in the Pro14, since 2013. It was also the first to feature a new format with all twelve teams together in one venue over two days.

The competition was held at Franklin's Gardens on 28 and 29 July 2017.

== Format ==
The twelve teams were split into four groups – A, B, C & D. Each team in the group played each other once, to World Rugby Laws of the Game – 7s Variations.
Based on the result, teams received:

- 4 points for a win
- 2 points for a draw
- 1 bonus point for a loss by seven points or less
- 1 bonus point for scoring four or more tries in a match

Following all matches in each group, the winner and runner-up in each group progressed to the quarter-finals and the third-placed team progressed to the bowl semi-final. The winners of each quarter-final qualified for the cup semi-finals, with the losers moving into a new plate tournament. Thereafter, competition was a simple knockout bracket, with the winner of the cup final being declared the series winner.

== Group stage ==
| Group A | Group B | Group C | Group D |
|---|---|---|---|
| Leicester Tigers 7s | Gloucester Rugby 7s | Bath Rugby 7s | Exeter Chiefs 7s |
| Newcastle Falcons 7s | Harlequins 7s | Sale Sharks 7s | Northampton Saints 7s |
| Wasps 7s | London Irish 7s | Worcester Warriors 7s | Saracens 7s |

Date: Friday, 28 July 2017 Venue: Franklin's Gardens, Northampton

=== Group A ===
| Pos | Team | Pld | W | D | L | F | A | PD | TF | TA | TB | LB | Pts |
|---|---|---|---|---|---|---|---|---|---|---|---|---|---|
| 1 | Wasps 7s | 2 | 2 | 0 | 0 | 83 | 10 | 73 | 13 | 2 | 2 | 0 | 10 |
| 2 | Newcastle Falcons 7s | 2 | 1 | 0 | 1 | 36 | 50 | -14 | 6 | 8 | 1 | 0 | 5 |
| 3 | Leicester Tigers 7s | 2 | 0 | 0 | 2 | 19 | 78 | -59 | 3 | 12 | 0 | 1 | 1 |
Green background is the pool winner and qualifies for the quarter-finals. Blue background is the runner-up, also qualifies for the quarter-finals and may progress to either cup or plate. white background progresses to bowl tournament Updated 29 July 2017 — source: Premiership Rugby

28 July 2017
18:00

| Wasps 7s | 31–10 | Newcastle Falcons 7s |

Franklin's Gardens

28 July 2017
19:28

| Wasps 7s | 52– 0 | Leicester Tigers 7s |

Franklin's Gardens

28 July 2017
20:56

| Newcastle Falcons 7s | 26–19 | Leicester Tigers 7s |

Franklin's Gardens

=== Group B ===
| Pos | Team | Pld | W | D | L | F | A | PD | TF | TA | TB | LB | Pts |
|---|---|---|---|---|---|---|---|---|---|---|---|---|---|
| 1 | Gloucester Rugby 7s | 2 | 2 | 0 | 0 | 83 | 10 | 73 | 13 | 2 | 2 | 0 | 10 |
| 2 | Harlequins 7s | 2 | 1 | 0 | 1 | 31 | 39 | -8 | 5 | 7 | 1 | 0 | 5 |
| 3 | London Irish 7s | 2 | 0 | 0 | 2 | 20 | 55 | -35 | 4 | 9 | 0 | 0 | 0 |
Green background is the pool winner and qualifies for the quarter-finals. Blue background is the runner-up, also qualifies for the quarter-finals and may progress to either cup or plate. white background progresses to bowl tournament Updated 29 July 2017 — source: Premiership Rugby

28 July 2017
18:22

| Harlequins 7s | 7–29 | Gloucester Rugby 7s |

Franklin's Gardens

28 July 2017
19:50

| Harlequins 7s | 24–10 | London Irish 7s |

Franklin's Gardens

28 July 2017
21:18

| Gloucester 7s | 31–10 | London Irish 7s |

Franklin's Gardens

=== Group C ===
| Pos | Team | Pld | W | D | L | F | A | PD | TF | TA | TB | LB | Pts |
|---|---|---|---|---|---|---|---|---|---|---|---|---|---|
| 1 | Worcester Warriors 7s | 2 | 2 | 0 | 0 | 62 | 17 | 45 | 10 | 3 | 2 | 0 | 10 |
| 2 | Sale Sharks 7s | 2 | 1 | 0 | 1 | 22 | 39 | -17 | 4 | 7 | 1 | 0 | 5 |
| 3 | Bath 7s | 2 | 0 | 0 | 2 | 29 | 57 | -28 | 5 | 9 | 0 | 0 | 0 |
Green background is the pool winner and qualifies for the quarter-finals. Blue background is the runner-up, also qualifies for the quarter-finals and may progress to either cup or plate. White background progresses to bowl tournament Updated 29 July 2017 — source: Premiership Rugby

28 July 2017
18:44

| Sale Sharks 7s | 0–27 | Worcester 7s |

Franklin's Gardens

28 July 2017
20:12

| Sale Sharks 7s | 22–12 | Bath 7s |

Franklin's Gardens

28 July 2017
21:40

| Worcester Warriors 7s | 35–17 | Bath Rugby 7s |

Franklin's Gardens

=== Group D ===
| Pos | Team | Pld | W | D | L | F | A | PD | TF | TA | TB | LB | Pts |
|---|---|---|---|---|---|---|---|---|---|---|---|---|---|
| 1 | Exeter Chiefs 7s | 2 | 1 | 0 | 1 | 52 | 26 | 26 | 8 | 4 | 1 | 1 | 6 |
| 2 | Saracens 7s | 2 | 1 | 0 | 1 | 33 | 29 | 4 | 5 | 5 | 1 | 1 | 6 |
| 3 | Northampton Saints 7s | 2 | 1 | 0 | 1 | 10 | 40 | -30 | 2 | 6 | 0 | 0 | 4 |
Green background is the pool winner and qualifies for the quarter-finals. Blue background is the runner-up, also qualifies for the quarter-finals and may progress to either cup or plate. White background progresses to bowl tournament Updated 29 July 2017 — source: Premiership Rugby

28 July 2017
19:06

| Exeter Chiefs 7s | 33–0 | Northampton Saints 7s |

Franklin's Gardens

28 July 2017
20:34

| Exeter Chiefs 7s | 19–26 | Saracens 7s |

Franklin's Gardens

28 July 2017
22:02

| Northampton Saints 7s | 10–7 | Saracens 7s |

Franklin's Gardens

== Finals stage ==
Finals day was played at Franklin's Gardens on Saturday, 29 July 2017.

The four pool winners played a quarter-final against a runner-up from another or the same pool. The winner of these quarter-finals competed in the cup competition, while the losers competed in the plate competition. The remaining four teams competed in the bowl competition.

=== Quarter-finals ===
29 July 2017
15:00

| Wasps 7s | 27–10 | Sale Sharks 7s |

Franklin's Gardens

29 July 2017
15:22

| Worcester Warriors 7s | 24– 28 | Newcastle Falcons 7s |

Franklin's Gardens

29 July 2017
15:44

| Gloucester Rugby 7s | 24– 26 | Harlequins 7s |

Franklin's Gardens

29 July 2017
16:06

| Exeter Chiefs 7s | 26–14 | Saracens 7s |

Franklin's Gardens

=== Bowl competition ===
==== Bowl semi-finals ====
29 July 2017
16:28

| Northampton Saints 7s | 28–12 | London Irish 7s |

Franklin's Gardens

29 July 2017
16:50

| Leicester Tigers 7s | 19–12 | Bath Rugby 7s |

Franklin's Gardens

==== Bowl final ====
29 July 2017
18:40

| Northampton Saints 7s | 24–21 | Leicester Tigers 7s |

Franklins Gardens

=== Plate competition ===
==== Plate semi-finals ====
29 July 2017
17:12

| Sale Sharks 7s | 15–31 | Saracens 7s |

Franklin's Gardens

29 July 2017
17:34

| Worcester Warriors 7s | 22–29 | Gloucester Rugby 7s |

Franklin's Gardens

==== Plate final ====
29 July 2017
19:02

| Saracens 7s | 12–22 | Gloucester Rugby 7s |

Franklin's Gardens

=== Cup competition ===
==== Semi-finals ====
29 July 2017
17:56

| Wasps 7s | 21–17 | Exeter Chiefs 7s |

Franklin's Gardens

29 July 2017
18:18

| Newcastle Falcons 7s | 29–24 | Harlequins 7s |

Franklin's Gardens

==== Final ====
29 July 2017
19:24

| Wasps 7s | 31–12 | Newcastle Falcons 7s |

Franklin's Gardens
