= 2018 Premiership Rugby Sevens Series =

2018 Premiership Rugby 7s Series
- Countries: England
- Champions: Saracens 7s
- Runners-up: Wasps 7s
- Matches played: 22

The 2018 Premiership Rugby Sevens Series would be the eighth rugby union sevens competition for the twelve clubs who compete in the 2018–19 Premiership Rugby clubs. It was also the second to feature the new format in which all twelve Premiership Rugby teams feature together in one venue over two days.

The competition would be held at Franklin's Gardens for the second successive year on 27 and 28 July 2018.

== Format ==
The twelve teams were split into four groups – A, B, C & D. Each team in the group played each other once, to World Rugby Laws of the Game – 7s Variations.
Based on the result, teams received:

- 4 points for a win
- 2 points for a draw
- 1 bonus point for a loss by seven points or less
- 1 bonus point for scoring four or more tries in a match

Following all matches in each group, the winner and runner-up in each group progressed to the quarter-finals. The winners of each quarter-final qualified for the cup semi-finals, with the losers eliminated. Thereafter, competition was a simple knockout bracket, with the winner of the cup final being declared the series winner. The third placed team in each pool compete in the plate competition.

== Group stage ==
Group A	Group B	Group C	Group D
Gloucester Rugby 7s	Leicester Tigers 7s	Bath Rugby 7s	Bristol Bears 7s
Northampton Saints 7s	Newcastle Falcons 7s	Exeter Chiefs 7s	Harlequins 7s
Wasps 7s	Saracens 7s	Worcester Warriors 7s	Sale Sharks 7s

Date: Friday, 27 July 2018

=== Group A ===
Pos	Team	Pld	W	D	L	F	A	PD	TF	TA	TB	LB	Pts
1	Wasps 7s	2	2	0	0	68	14	54	10	3	2	0	10
2	Northampton Saints 7s	2	1	0	1	39	55	-16	5	9	1	0	5
3	Gloucester Rugby 7s	2	0	0	2	27	55	-33	5	9	1	1	2
Green background progresses to the quarter-finals and may progress to cup. White background will compete in plate competition. Updated 27 July — source: Premiership Rugby

27 July 2018
18:38

Northampton Saints 7s	22–20	Gloucester Rugby 7s

Franklin's Gardens

27 July 2018
20:08

Wasps 7s	33–7	Gloucester Rugby 7s

Franklin's Gardens

27 July 2018
21:38

Northampton Saints 7s	7–35	Wasps 7s

Franklin's Gardens

=== Group B ===
Pos	Team	Pld	W	D	L	F	A	PD	TF	TA	TB	LB	Pts
1	Newcastle Falcons 7s	2	2	0	0	47	31	16	7	5	0	0	9
2	Saracens 7s	2	1	0	1	43	40	3	7	6	1	0	5
3	Leicester Tigers 7s	2	0	0	2	28	47	-19	4	7	0	1	1
Green background progresses to the quarter-finals and may progress to cup. White background will compete in plate competition. Updated 27 July — source: Premiership Rugby

27 July 2018
18:15

Saracens 7s	17–26	Newcastle Falcons 7s

Franklin's Gardens

27 July 2018
19:45

Newcastle Falcons 7s	21–14	Leicester Tigers 7s

Franklin's Gardens

27 July 2018
21:15

Saracens 7s	26–14	Leicester Tigers 7s

Franklin's Gardens

=== Group C ===
Pos	Team	Pld	W	D	L	F	A	PD	TF	TA	TB	LB	Pts
1	Exeter Chiefs 7s	2	2	0	0	59	29	30	9	5	3	0	10
2	Bath Rugby 7s	2	1	0	1	44	53	-9	8	7	1	0	5
3	Worcester Warriors 7s	2	0	0	2	26	57	-36	4	9	0	0	0
Green background progresses to the quarter-finals and may progress to cup. White background will compete in plate competition. Updated 27 July — source: Premiership Rugby

27 July 2018
17:53

Bath 7s	29–12	Worcester Warriors 7s

Franklin's Gardens

27 July 2018
19:23

Exeter Chiefs 7s	28–14	Worcester Warriors 7s

Franklin's Gardens

27 July 2018
20:53

Exeter Chiefs 7s	31–15	Bath 7s

Franklin's Gardens

=== Group D ===
Pos	Team	Pld	W	D	L	F	A	PD	TF	TA	TB	LB	Pts
1	Harlequins 7s	2	2	0	0	65	33	33	11	5	1	0	10
2	Sale Sharks 7s	2	1	0	1	47	36	11	7	6	1	2	6
3	Bristol Bears 7s	2	0	0	2	24	67	-43	4	11	0	0	0
Green background progresses to the quarter-finals and may progress to cup. White background will compete in plate competition. Updated 27 July — source: Premiership Rugby

27 July 2018
17:30

Bristol Bears 7s	12–26	Sale Sharks 7s

Franklin's Gardens

27 July 2018
19:00

Harlequins 7s	41–12	Bristol Bears 7s

Franklin's Gardens

27 July 2018
20:30

Harlequins 7s	24–21	Sale Sharks 7s

Franklin's Gardens

== Finals stage ==
Finals day was played on Saturday, 28 July 2018.

The four pool winners played a quarter-final against the runners-up in a 1 v 8, 2 v 7, 3 v 6 4 v 5 format. The winner of these quarter-finals competed in the cup competition, while the losers were eliminated. The third placed team in each pool competed in the plate competition.

=== Quarter-finals ===
28 July 2018
14:30

Wasps 7s (1)	17 — 10	(8) Northampton Saints 7s

Franklin's Gardens

28 July 2018
14:53

Newcastle Falcons 7s (4)	17 — 12	(5) Sale Sharks 7s

Franklin's Gardens

28 July 2018
15:15

Exeter Chiefs 7s (3)	24 — 29	(6) Saracens 7s

Franklin's Gardens

28 July 2018
15:38

Harlequins 7s (2)	31 — 29	(7) Bath 7s

Franklin's Gardens

=== Plate competition ===
==== Plate semi-finals ====
28 July 2018
16:00

Gloucester 7s	24 — 19	Bristol Bears 7s

Franklin's Gardens

28 July 2018
16:23

Leicester Tigers 7s	15 — 26	Worcester Warriors 7s

Franklin's Gardens

==== Plate final ====
28 July 2018
17:40

Gloucester 7s	17 — 15	Worcester Warriors 7s

Franklin's Gardens

=== Cup competition ===
==== Semi-finals ====
28 July 2018
16:45

Wasps	33 — 24	Newcastle Falcons 7s

Franklin's Gardens

28 July 2018
17:08

Saracens 7s	29 — 21	Harlequins 7s

Franklin's Gardens

==== Final ====
28 July 2018
18:18

Wasps 7s	12 — 33	Saracens 7s

Franklin's Gardens
