= Modus Cup =

Annual rugby union fixture

The Modus Challenge Cup is an annual rugby union fixture held in late October between The Royal Grammar School Worcester (RGS) and The King's School, Worcester (KSW). The match is traditionally played at Sixways Stadium, the home ground of Worcester Warriors. The fixture has been contested annually since 2007, with the exception of cancelled years.

== Head-to-head record ==
As of 2025, The King's School Worcester leads the series 10–6.

== Results by year ==
Year	Winner	Score	Captains	Sources / notes
2007	Royal Grammar School Worcester	20–12	Not recorded	
2008	King's School Worcester	21–7	Not recorded	
2009	Royal Grammar School Worcester	3–0	Bill Harling (RGS)	
2010	—	Cancelled	Harry Nuttall (KSW); James Brooks (RGS)	Cancelled due to heavy snow
2011	King's School Worcester	34–6	Harry Nuttall (KSW); Curtis Tonks (RGS)	
2012	King's School Worcester	15–3	George Jeavons-Fellows (KSW); Chip Lawton (RGS)	
2013	Royal Grammar School Worcester	12–8	Will Elt (KSW); Harry Bee (RGS)	
2014	King's School Worcester	11–6	Ryan Kerley (KSW); Will Tromans (RGS)	
2015	King's School Worcester	32–3	Jacob Ham (KSW); Gus Thomas (RGS)	
2016	King's School Worcester	15–5	James Smalley (KSW); Natt Nott (RGS)	
2017	Royal Grammar School Worcester	13–10	George Bates (KSW); George Mann (RGS)	
2018	Royal Grammar School Worcester	32–13	Max Richardson (KSW); Tom Berry (RGS)	
2019	King's School Worcester	22–7	HamsterStig (KSW); Ollie Whicombe (RGS)	
2020	—	Cancelled	—	Cancelled due to the COVID-19 pandemic
2021	King's School Worcester	39–12	Alex Terry (KSW); Ben Gaubert (RGS)	
2022	Royal Grammar School Worcester	20–17	Laurie Checkley (KSW); Loïc Keasey (RGS)	
2023	King's School Worcester	34–8	Archie Moore (KSW); Daniel Halkon (RGS)	
2024	King's School Worcester	29–19	Will Mason (KSW); Finn Nichol (RGS)	
2025	Royal Grammar School Worcester	21–20	Will Dorell (KSW); Liam Chadwick (RGS)	

== Total points scored ==
The King's School Worcester: 332

The Royal Grammar School Worcester: 197
