= Kingsholm =

Area in Gloucester

Coordinates: 51.87°N 2.24°W

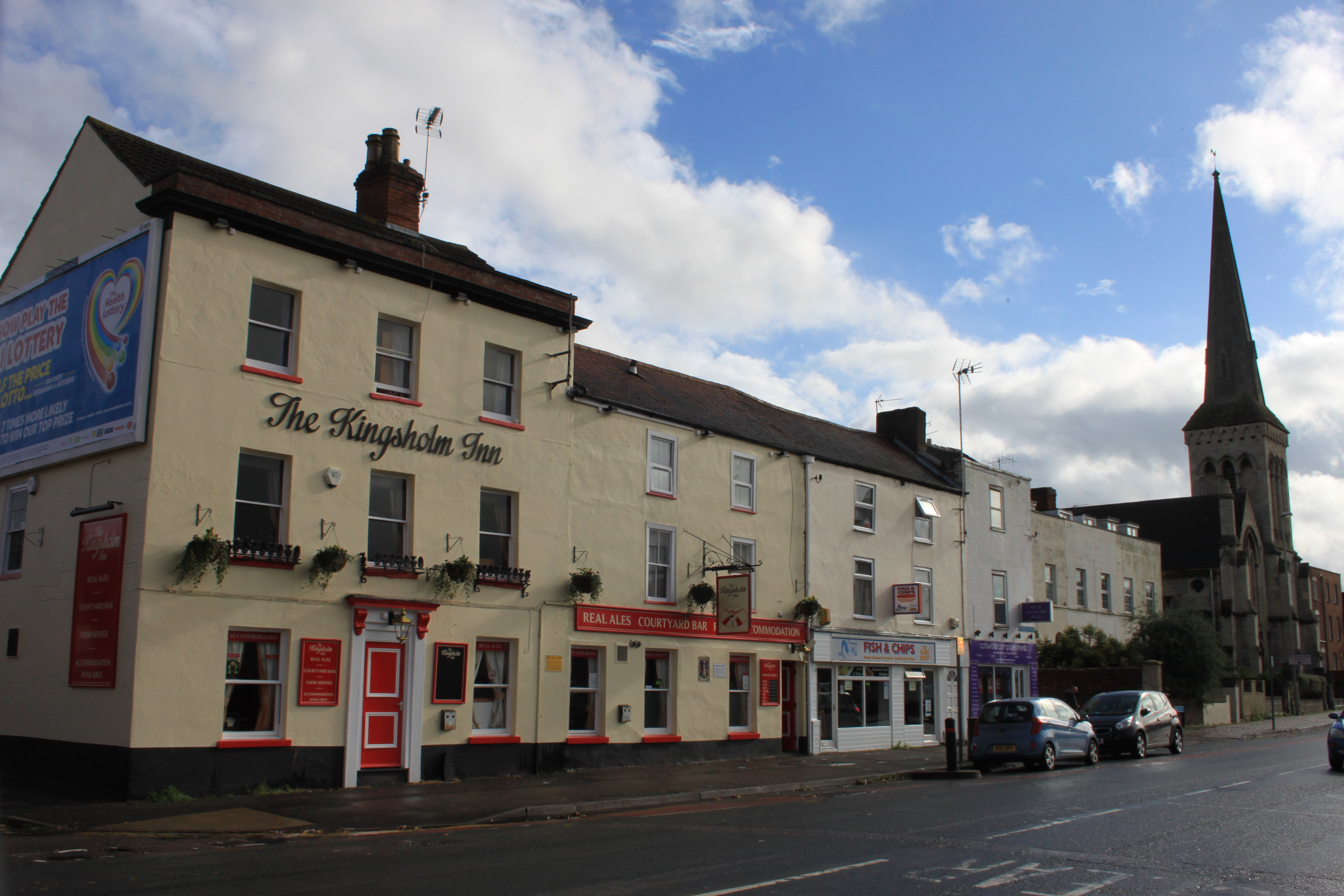
- Destiny Temple and the Kingsholm Inn, 2016.

- Location within Gloucestershire
- Population: 9,329 (2021)
- OS grid reference: SO8319
- District: Gloucester
- Shire county: Gloucestershire
- Region: South West
- Country: England
- Sovereign state: United Kingdom
- Post town: GLOUCESTER
- Postcode district: GL1
- Dialling code: 01452
- Police: Gloucestershire
- Fire: Gloucestershire
- Ambulance: South Western
- UK Parliament: Gloucester

Kingsholm is an area of Gloucester, in the county of Gloucestershire, England. It is home to Kingsholm Stadium, which hosts Gloucester Rugby and other international matches. It is also home to a Church of England school, Kingsholm Primary School.

== History ==
Kingsholm was the site of a Roman fort, which was built in the year 40 AD, to control a since-silted up branch of the River Severn, but was abandoned in 500 AD. The site was later the location of an Anglo-Saxon royal palace.

The area was initially heavily used for farming and manufacturing purposes. In the 19th and 20th centuries, Kingsholm featured the cities iron foundries—one later being redeveloped into Gloucestershire Archives.

Gloucester Rugby have played in Kingsholm since 1891, when the development of the stadium began.

In 1963, Kingsholm Primary School was opened.

In 2015, Kingsholm Stadium was one of the hosting stadiums of the 2015 Rugby World Cup.

== Kingsholm and Wotton ==
In 2021, Kingsholm and the area of Wotton had a population of 9329. Kingsholm and Wotton is a ward in the city parish of Gloucester.

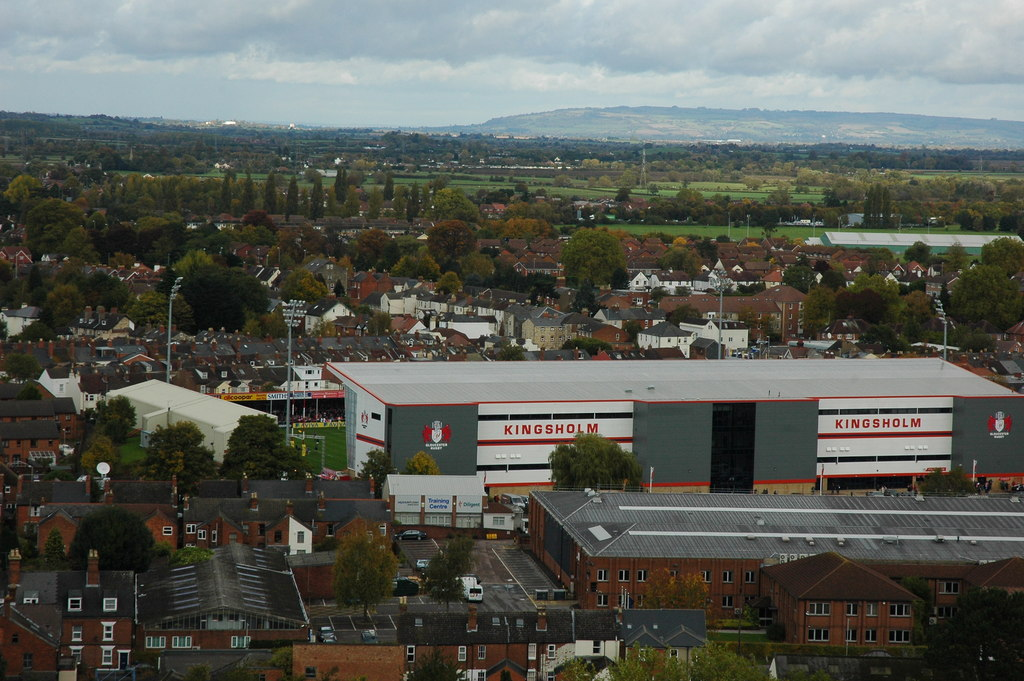
Kingsholm Stadium and its surrounding areas.
