= 1927–28 Rugby Union County Championship =

English rugby union competition

1927–28 County Championship
- Countries: England
- Champions: Yorkshire (9th title)
- Runners-up: Cornwall

The 1927–28 Rugby Union County Championship was the 35th edition of England's premier rugby union club competition at the time.

Yorkshire won the competition for the ninth time after defeating Cornwall in the final.

== Final ==
10 March 1928

Yorkshire	12–8	Cornwall
Try: Stansfield, Tetley, Proctor, Faithfull		Try: Peake, Collins; Con: Gosling

Lidget Green, Bradford

W Guest	Wakefield
C F Tetley	Bradford
F W Roberts	Bradford
Frank Malir	Otley
W S Stansfield	Old Bradfordians
H V Wade	Hartlepool Rovers
D Bradley	Morley
Charles Faithfull	Halifax
S R Whitfield	Batley
Alfred Bateson	Otley
W H Chalcroft	Halifax
H L Proctor	Headingley
T C Atkinson	Otley
C Smith	Huddersfield Old Boys
H Wilkinson	Halifax

C G Gosling	Devonport United Services
C Jago (capt)	Penryn
Roy Jennings	Redruth
P Collins	Camborne
L Roberts	Redruth
F Rogers	Camborne
J Andrew	Redruth
P Evans	Camborne
J Hollow	Redruth
W N Peake	Plymouth Albion
W T Biddick	Camborne
F Selwood	Camborne
H Maddrell	Penzance
F Brooker	Redruth
I Jacket	Falmouth

== See also ==
- English rugby union system
- Rugby union in England
