= 1990–91 National Division 4 North =

Rugby union competition in England

- Countries: England
- Champions: Otley (1st title)
- Runners-up: Lichfield (not promoted)
- Relegated: Birmingham & Solihull, Stoke-on-Trent
- Matches played: 110

The 1990–91 National Division 4 North was the fourth full season of rugby union within the fourth tier of the English league system, currently known as National League 2 North, and counterpart to the National Division 4 South (now National League 2 South). It was the first season for the division using the name National 4 North, having been known as Area League North the previous year. The league champions were newly promoted Otley who comfortably achieved their second successive promotion, this time to the 1991–92 National Division 3, five points clear of runners up Lichfield.

At the other end of the table, Birmingham & Solihull and Stoke-on-Trent and were the two sides to be relegated. For Birmingham & Solihull fans it was a familiar story, as previous incarnations of the club (Solihull and Birmingham) had already been relegated from the division. Both sides would drop to Midlands 1.

== Structure ==
Each team played one match against each of the other teams, playing a total of ten matches each. The champions are promoted to National Division 3 and the bottom team was relegated to either North 1 or Midlands 1 depending on their locality.

== Participating teams and locations ==
Locations of the 1990–91 National Division 4 North teams

Team	Ground	Capacity	City/Area	Previous Season
Birmingham & Solihull	Sharmans Cross	4,000	Solihull, West Midlands	Promoted from Midlands 1 (2nd)
Durham City	Hollow Drift	3,000 (500 seats)	Durham, County Durham	4th
Kendal	Mint Bridge	4,600 (600 seats)	Kendal, Cumbria	5th
Harrogate	Claro Road	4,500 (500 seats)	Harrogate, North Yorkshire	Promoted from North 1 (2nd)
Hereford	Wyeside	3,200 (200 seats)	Hereford, Herefordshire	Promoted from Midlands 1 (1st)
Lichfield	Cooke Fields	5,460 (460 seats)	Lichfield, Staffordshire	7th
Northern	McCracken Park	1,200 (200 seats)	Newcastle upon Tyne, Tyne and Wear	8th
Otley	Cross Green	7,000 (852 seats)	Otley, West Yorkshire	Promoted from North 1 (1st)
Preston Grasshoppers	Lightfoot Green	2,250 (250 seats)	Preston, Lancashire	6th
Stoke-on-Trent	Hartwell Lane	2,000	Barlaston, Staffordshire	11th (not relegated)
Stourbridge	Stourton Park	2,000	Stourbridge, West Midlands	3rd
Walsall	Broadway	2,500 (500 seats)	Walsall, West Midlands	10th
Winnington Park	Burrows Hill	5,000	Norwich, Cheshire	9th

== League table ==
1990–91 National Division 4 North
Pos	Team	Pld	W	D	L	PF	PA	PD	Pts	Qualification
1	Otley (C)	12	11	0	1	424	89	+335	22	Promotion place
2	Lichfield	12	8	1	3	177	152	+25	17	
3	Preston Grasshoppers	12	8	0	4	192	108	+84	16	
4	Winnington Park	12	7	1	4	167	148	+19	15	
5	Kendal	12	6	2	4	191	132	+59	14	
6	Harrogate	12	6	1	5	220	204	+16	13	
7	Northern	12	5	3	4	148	169	−21	13	
8	Stourbridge	12	5	1	6	134	161	−27	11	
9	Walsall	12	5	0	7	149	176	−27	10	
10	Durham City	12	4	1	7	109	185	−76	9	
11	Hereford	12	3	2	7	122	208	−86	8	
12	Stoke-on-Trent (R)	12	2	1	9	126	278	−152	5	Relegation place
13	Birmingham & Solihull (R)	12	1	1	10	116	265	−149	3	Relegation place

Rules for classification: Points are awarded as follows:
1. 2 pts for a win
2. 1 pt for a draw
3. 0 pts for a loss
4. If teams are level at any stage, difference between points for and against applies
  (C) Champions; (R) Relegated

== Sponsorship ==
Division 4 North is part of the Courage Clubs Championship and was sponsored by Courage Brewery.

== See also ==
- 1990–91 National Division 1
- 1990–91 National Division 2
- 1990–91 National Division 3
- 1990–91 National Division 4 South
