= 1990–91 National Division 3 =

Rugby union competition in England

- Countries: England
- Date: 22 September 1990 – 27 April 1991
- Champions: West Hartlepool (1st title)
- Runners-up: Morley (also promoted)
- Relegated: Metropolitan Police; Vale of Lune
- Matches played: 78
- Top point scorer: 108 – Mark Rodgers (Sheffield)
- Top try scorer: 9 – Jonathan Wrigley (West Hartlepool)

The 1990–91 National Division 3 (sponsored by Courage Brewery) was the fourth season of the third tier of the English rugby union league system, the Courage Clubs Championship, currently known as National League 1. New teams to the division included Broughton Park, Clifton, Metropolitan Police and Morley, all of whom were promoted from tier 4, and due to reorganisation of the league structure at the end of the previous season, there were no relegated sides coming down from tier 2.

West Hartlepool finished the season as champions, two points clear of runners up Morley. Both sides would be promoted to the 1991–92 National Division 2, with Morley having been promoted for the second year running. At the other end of the table, the relegated sides were Vale of Lune and Metropolitan Police, dropping to the new look 1991–92 National Division 4 North and 1991–92 National Division 4 South respectively.

== Structure ==
The division increased from twelve teams to thirteen, each side playing the others once to make a total of twelve matches each. The top two sides would be promoted to National Division 2 while the bottom two would drop to either National Division 4 North or National Division 4 South (formerly Area League North and South) depending on locality.

== Participating teams and locations ==
1990–91 National Division 3 teams in England

Team	Stadium	Capacity	City/Area	Previous season
Askeans	Broad Walk	1,500 (300 seats)	Kidbrooke, London	5th
Broughton Park	Chelsfield Grove	2,000 (400 seats)	Chorlton-cum-Hardy, Manchester	Promoted from Area North (1st)
Clifton	Station Road	2,200 (200 seats)	Cribbs Causeway, Henbury, Bristol	Promoted from Area South (2nd)
Exeter	County Ground	5,750 (750 seats)	Exeter, Devon	6th
Fylde	Woodlands	7,500 (500 seats)	Lytham St Annes, Lancashire	8th
Lydney	Regentsholm	3,000 (340 seats)	Lydney, Gloucestershire	10th
Metropolitan Police	Imber Court	3,500 (500 seats)	East Molesey, Surrey	Promoted from Area South (1st)
Morley	Scatcherd Lane	6,000 (1,000 seats)	Morley, Leeds	Promoted from Area North (2nd)
Nuneaton	Harry Cleaver Ground	5,000 (650 seats)	Nuneaton, Warwickshire	11th
Roundhay	Chandos Park	3,000	Roundhay, Leeds West Yorkshire	7th
Sheffield	Abbeydale Park	3,300 (100 seats) (Note: Although a 1990 club estimate was 1,100 (100 seated and 1,000 standing) this is very conservative as Abbeydale Park would experience 3,000+ crowds several times in later history in what was a relatively unchanged ground.)	Dore, Sheffield, South Yorkshire	4th
Vale of Lune	Powderhouse Lane	9,860 (360 seats)	Lancaster, Lancashire	9th
West Hartlepool	Brierton Lane	4,950 (450 seats)	Hartlepool, Cleveland	3rd

== League table ==
1990–91 National Division 3 table
Pos	Team	Pld	W	D	L	PF	PA	PD	Pts	Qualification
1	West Hartlepool (C)	12	10	1	1	282	90	+192	21	Promotion place
2	Morley	12	9	1	2	210	118	+92	19	Promotion place
3	Fylde	12	7	2	3	183	115	+68	16	
4	Exeter	12	7	2	3	160	139	+21	16	
5	Clifton	12	6	1	5	172	186	−14	13	
6	Askeans	12	4	2	6	141	137	+4	10	
7	Nuneaton	12	5	0	7	180	200	−20	10	
8	Broughton Park	12	5	0	7	109	185	−76	10	
9	Roundhay	12	4	1	7	147	166	−19	9	
10	Sheffield	12	4	1	7	193	222	−29	9	
11	Lydney	12	4	1	7	125	188	−63	9	
12	Metropolitan Police	12	4	0	8	130	188	−58	8	Relegation place
13	Vale of Lune	12	3	0	9	123	221	−98	6	Relegation place

Rules for classification: Points are awarded as follows:
1. 2 pts for a win
2. 1 pt for a draw
3. 0 pts for a loss

If teams are level at any stage, the following tiebreaker is applied:

1. Difference between points for and against
  (C) Champions

== Sponsorship ==
National Division Three is part of the Courage Clubs Championship and is sponsored by Courage Brewery

== See also ==
- 1990–91 National Division 1
- 1990–91 National Division 2
- 1990–91 National Division 4 North
- 1990–91 National Division 4 South
