= 1991–92 National Division 3 =

Rugby union competition in England

- Countries: England
- Date: 16 November 1991 – 25 April 1992
- Champions: Richmond (1st title)
- Runners-up: Fylde (also promoted)
- Relegated: Nuneaton, Lydney
- Matches played: 78
- Top point scorer: 106 – Mike Jackson (Fylde)
- Top try scorer: 8 – Matt Brain (Clifton)

The 1991–92 National Division 3 (sponsored by Courage Brewery) was the fifth season of the third tier of the English rugby union league system, the Courage Clubs Championship, currently known as National League 1. New teams to the division included Headingley and Richmond (demoted from tier 2) and Otley and Redurth (promoted from tier 4).

Richmond finished as league champions, two points clear of runners up Fylde. Both sides would be promoted to the 1992–93 National Division 2, with Richmond making an instant return after relegation the previous season. At the opposite end of the table, the relegated sides were Nuneaton (down to 1992–93 National Division 4 North) and Lydney (down to 1992–93 National Division 4 South).

== Structure ==
Each side in the division played the others once to make a total of twelve matches each. The top two sides would be promoted to National Division 2 while the bottom two would drop to either National Division 4 North or National Division 4 South depending on locality.

== Participating teams and locations ==
1991–92 National Division 3 teams in England

Team	Stadium	Capacity	City/Area	Previous season
Askeans	Broad Walk	1,500 (300 seats)	Kidbrooke, London	6th
Broughton Park	Chelsfield Grove	2,000 (400 seats)	Chorlton-cum-Hardy, Manchester	8th
Clifton	Station Road	2,200 (200 seats)	Cribbs Causeway, Henbury, Bristol	5th
Exeter	County Ground	5,750 (750 seats)	Exeter, Devon	4th
Fylde	Woodlands	7,500 (500 seats)	Lytham St Annes, Lancashire	3rd
Headingley	Clarence Fields	7,850 (850 seats)	Leeds, West Yorkshire	Relegated from National 2 (13th)
Lydney	Regentsholm	3,000 (340 seats)	Lydney, Gloucestershire	11th
Nuneaton	Harry Cleaver Ground	5,000 (650 seats)	Nuneaton, Warwickshire	7th
Otley	Cross Green	7,000 (852 seats)	Otley, West Yorkshire	Promoted from National 4 North (1st)
Redruth	Recreation Ground	12,000	Redruth, Cornwall	Promoted from National 4 South (1st)
Richmond	Athletic Ground	7,300 (1,300 seats)	Richmond, London	Relegated from National 2 (12th)
Roundhay	Chandos Park	3,000	Roundhay, Leeds West Yorkshire	9th
Sheffield	Abbeydale Park	3,300 (100 seats) (Note: Although a 1990 club estimate was 1,100 (100 seated and 1,000 standing) this is very conservative as Abbeydale Park would experience 3,000+ crowds several times in later history in what was a relatively unchanged ground.)	Dore, Sheffield, South Yorkshire	10th

== League table ==
1991–92 National Division 3 table
Pos	Team	Pld	W	D	L	PF	PA	PD	Pts	Qualification
1	Richmond (C)	12	10	1	1	296	124	+172	21	Promoted
2	Fylde	12	9	1	2	198	109	+89	19	Promoted
3	Clifton	12	9	0	3	298	132	+166	18	
4	Exeter	12	8	2	2	203	138	+65	18	
5	Redruth	12	6	1	5	155	123	+32	13	
6	Broughton Park	12	5	1	6	196	157	+39	11	
7	Askeans	12	5	1	6	149	203	−54	11	
8	Sheffield	12	5	1	6	146	228	−82	11	
9	Otley	12	5	0	7	177	190	−13	10	
10	Roundhay	12	3	2	7	161	240	−79	8	
11	Headingley	12	4	0	8	139	220	−81	8	
12	Nuneaton	12	1	2	9	153	237	−84	4	Relegated
13	Lydney	12	2	0	10	91	261	−170	4	Relegated

Rules for classification: Points are awarded as follows: 2 pts for a win, 1 pt for a draw, 0 pts for a loss. If teams are level at any stage, the following tiebreaker is applied: Difference between points for and against.
(C) Champions

== See also ==
- 1991–92 National Division 1
- 1991–92 National Division 2
- 1991–92 National Division 4 North
- 1991–92 National Division 4 South
