= 2000–01 National Division Three North =

Rugby union competition in England

- Countries: England
- Champions: Stourbridge
- Runners-up: Sedgley Park (also promoted)
- Relegated: Aspatria, Walsall
- Attendance: 40,865 (average 389 per match) (Note: Note that 77 home attendances are missing (see below) - so the total attendance will not be 100% accurate. The average attendance has also been taken into account with the missing games not included.)
- Highest attendance: 1,500 – Dudley Kingswinford v Stourbridge, 16 December 2000, Stourbridge v Dudley Kingswinford, 31 March 2001
- Lowest attendance: 100 – Aspatria v Sedgley Park, 18 November 2000, Aspatria v Tynedale, 2 December 2000
- Top point scorer: 298 – Paul Brett (New Brighton)
- Top try scorer: 20 – Gary Marshall (Nuneaton)

The 2000–01 National Division Three North was the first season (fourteenth overall) of the fourth division (north) of the English domestic rugby union competition using the name National Division Three North. New teams to the division included Dudley Kingswinford who were promoted as the champions of Midlands Division 1 and Tynedale who were champions of North Division 1 with no northern based teams being relegated from the 1999-00 Jewson National League One. The league system was 2 points for a win and 1 point for a draw with the promotion system changing for this season with a playoff system being introduced. The champions of both National Division Three North and National Division Three South would automatically go up but the runners up of these two divisions would meet each other in a one off match (at the home ground of the side with the superior league record) to see who would claim the third and final promotion place to National Division Two for the following season.

The season was a very fractured one due to the 2001 United Kingdom foot-and-mouth outbreak which primarily affected the two northernmost clubs in the division - Aspatria and Tynedale - leading to a large number of fixtures being cancelled in the latter half of the season. The league champions were Stourbridge who pipped Sedgley Park to the league title by just one point to gain promotion to the 2001–02 National Division Two. Sedgley Park would join them soon after when they won their promotion playoff game at home against the 2000-01 National Division Three South runners up Launceston in front of over 1,000 fans. The foot-and-mouth outbreak made relegation far from straightforward as initially the bottom two were Aspatria and Tynedale, who had played 18 games each - less than any of the other teams in the division. In Tynedale's case this was particularly hard as they were only 1 point behind 12th placed Sandal but had played six games less. In the end the RFU had to re-think relegation and used a complicated process based on early season form which meant that 14th placed Aspatria and 11th placed Walsall went down. Aspatria dropped to North Division 1 while Walsall went into Midlands Division 1.

== Participating teams and locations ==
2000–01 National 3 North teams in England

Team	Ground	Capacity	City/Area	Previous season
Aspatria	Bower Park	3,000 (300 seats)	Aspatria, Cumbria	12th
Bedford Athletic	Putnoe Woods	500	Bedford, Bedfordshire	9th
Doncaster	Castle Park	3,075	Doncaster, South Yorkshire	6th
Dudley Kingswinford	Heathbrook	2,260	Kingswinford, Dudley, West Midlands	Promoted from Midlands 1 (1st)
Liverpool St Helens	Moss Lane	4,370 (370 seats)	St Helens, Merseyside	13th
Morley	Scatcherd Lane	6,000 (1,000 seats)	Morley, Leeds, West Yorkshire	7th
New Brighton	Hartsfield	2,000	Moreton, Merseyside	3rd
Nuneaton	Liberty Way	3,800 (500 seats)	Nuneaton, Warwickshire	8th
Sandal	Milnthorpe Green		Sandal Magna, Wakefield, West Yorkshire	10th
Sedgley Park	Park Lane	3,000	Whitefield, Greater Manchester	5th
Stourbridge	Stourton Park	3,500 (450 seats)	Stourbridge, West Midlands	2nd
Tynedale	Tynedale Park	2,000 (400 seats)	Corbridge, Northumberland	Promoted from North 1 (1st)
Walsall	Broadway	2,250 (250 seats)	Walsall, West Midlands	4th
Whitchurch	Edgeley Park		Whitchurch, Shropshire	11th

== Final league table ==
2000–01 National Division Three North table
Pos	Team	Pld	W	D	L	PF	PA	PD	Pts	Qualification
1	Stourbridge (C)	25	21	1	3	861	368	+493	43	Promoted
2	Sedgley Park (P)	25	21	0	4	887	327	+560	42	Promotion play-off
3	New Brighton	24	19	0	5	668	336	+332	38	
4	Doncaster	23	16	0	7	579	352	+227	32	
5	Nuneaton	26	15	1	10	597	605	−8	31	
6	Dudley Kingswinford	24	11	1	12	485	519	−34	23	
7	Liverpool St Helens	25	10	0	15	511	666	−155	20	
8	Bedford Athletic	24	8	0	16	386	613	−227	16	
9	Morley	25	8	0	17	468	720	−252	16	
10	Whitchurch	21	8	0	13	357	636	−279	16	
11	Walsall (Note: Walsall relegated after RFU re-think over relegation due to impact over foot-and-mouth which lead to early season form being put into account.) (R)	24	7	0	17	533	601	−68	14	Relegated
12	Sandal	24	7	0	17	542	868	−326	14	
13	Tynedale	18	6	1	11	282	311	−29	13	
14	Aspatria (R)	18	4	0	14	307	541	−234	8	Relegated

Updated to match(es) played on 26-05-2001. Source: englandrugby.com
(C) Champions; (P) Promoted; (R) Relegated

== Results ==
Be aware that some of the early season scores from Rugby Statbunker may be incorrect (possibly due to an automatic scoring system used on that website) as they are different from those reported in the Telegraph. I have used references from the Telegraph wherever possible which should tie in with the results from the England rugby website.

=== Round 1 ===
2 September 2000

Aspatria	30 - 20	Bedford Athletic
	Report

Bower Park
Attendance: 200
Referee: Alan Hughes

2 September 2000

Doncaster	64 - 21	Whitchurch
	Report

Castle Park
Attendance: 265
Referee: Tony Rossall

2 September 2000

Liverpool St Helens	6 - 34	Tynedale
	Report

Moss Lane
Attendance: 200
Referee: Tim Wigglesworth

2 September 2000

New Brighton	12 - 9	Sedgley Park
	Report

Hartsfield
Attendance: 200
Referee: Mark Wilson

2 September 2000

Sandal	18 - 22	Nuneaton
	Report

Milnthorpe Green
Attendance: 200
Referee: Rob Sheard

2 September 2000

Stourbridge	73 - 17	Morley
	Report

Stourton Park
Attendance: 400
Referee: Richard Parker-Sedgmore

2 September 2000

Walsall	16 - 9	Dudley Kingswinford
	Report

Broadway Ground
Attendance: 470
Referee: Rob Debney

=== Round 2 ===
10 September 2000

Aspatria	13 - 20	Dudley Kingswinford
	Report

Bower Park
Attendance: 175
Referee: Rob Sheard

10 September 2000

Liverpool St Helens	14 - 33	Doncaster
	Report

Moss Lane
Attendance: 200
Referee: Alan Hughes

10 September 2000

New Brighton	53 - 0	Whitchurch
	Report

Hartsfield
Attendance: 200
Referee: Tim Wigglesworth

10 September 2000

Sandal	10 - 23	Tynedale
	Report

Milnthorpe Green

10 September 2000

Bedford Athletic	P - P	Morley

- Postponed. Game rescheduled to 23 September 2000.

10 September 2000

Stourbridge	P - P	Sedgley Park

- Postponed. Game rescheduled to 23 September 2000.

10 September 2000

Walsall	P - P	Nuneaton

- Postponed. Game rescheduled to 23 September 2000.

=== Round 3 ===
16 September 2000

Dudley Kingswinford	21 - 7	Bedford Athletic
	Report

Heathbrook
Attendance: 500
Referee: Alan Biggs

16 September 2000

Morley	12 - 10	Walsall
	Report

Scatchherd Lane
Attendance: 400
Referee: Paul Dickens

16 September 2000

Nuneaton	5 - 46	Stourbridge
	Report

Liberty Way
Referee: David Helme

16 September 2000

Tynedale	10 - 16	New Brighton
	Report

Tynedale Park
Attendance: 250
Referee: Chris Sharp

16 September 2000

Whitchurch	30 - 17	Liverpool St Helens
	Report

Edgeley Park
Attendance: 450
Referee: Adam Canning

16 September 2000

Doncaster	P - P	Aspatria

- Postponed. Game rescheduled to 21 October 2001.

16 September 2000

Sedgley Park	P - P	Sandal

- Postponed. Game rescheduled to 3 February 2001.

=== Round 2 & 3 (rescheduled games) ===
23 September 2000

Bedford Athletic	25 - 17	Morley
	Report

Putnoe Woods
Attendance: 250
Referee: Anthony Ellison

- Game rescheduled from 10 September 2000.

23 September 2000

Doncaster	55 - 33	Sandal
	Report

Castle Park

- Game brought forward from 10 February 2001.

23 September 2000

Stourbridge	49 - 12	Sedgley Park
	Report

Stourton Park
Attendance: 400
Referee: David Matthews

- Game rescheduled from 10 September 2000.

23 September 2000

Walsall	8 - 28	Nuneaton
	Report

Broadway Ground
Attendance: 350
Referee: Tim Wigglesworth

- Game rescheduled from 10 September 2000.

=== Round 4 ===
30 September 2000

Doncaster	11 - 3	New Brighton
	Report

Castle Park

30 September 2000

Liverpool St Helens	19 - 10	Aspatria
	Report

Moss Lane

30 September 2000

Morley	17 - 16	Dudley Kingswinford
	Report

Scatcherd Lane
Attendance: 450
Referee: Tony Rossall

30 September 2000

Nuneaton	22 - 13	Bedford Athletic
	Report

Liberty Way
Referee: Andrew Tong

30 September 2000

Sedgley Park	25 - 7	Walsall
	Report

Park Lane
Attendance: 300
Referee: Richard Parker-Sedgmore

30 September 2000

Tynedale	16 - 35	Stourbridge
	Report

Tynedale Park

30 September 2000

Whitchurch	22 - 52	Sandal
	Report

Edgeley Park
Attendance: 300
Referee: Tim Wigglesworth

=== Round 5 ===
14 October 2000

Aspatria	26 - 40	Morley
	Report

Bower Park
Attendance: 150
Referee: Chris Sharp

14 October 2000

Bedford Athletic	23 - 18	Sedgley Park
	Report

Putnoe Woods
Attendance: 300
Referee: Andrew Canning

14 October 2000

Dudley Kingswinford	48 - 13	Nuneaton
	Report

Heathbrook
Attendance: 500
Referee: R Glynne Jones

14 October 2000

New Brighton	24 - 9	Liverpool St Helens
	Report

Hartsfield
Attendance: 600

14 October 2000

Sandal	11 - 53	Doncaster
	Report

Milnthorpe Green
Attendance: 250
Referee: David Helme

14 October 2000

Stourbridge	65 - 7	Whitchurch
	Report

Stourton Park
Attendance: 450
Referee: Chris Seeley

14 October 2000

Walsall	24 - 23	Tynedale
	Report

Broadway Ground
Attendance: 200
Referee: Nick Williams

=== Round 3 (rescheduled game) ===
21 October 2000

Doncaster	43 - 20	Aspatria
	Report

Castle Park
Attendance: 650
Referee: Tim Wigglesworth

- Game rescheduled from 16 September 2000.

=== Round 6 ===
28 October 2000

Aspatria	15 - 18	Nuneaton
	Report

Bower Park

28 October 2000

Bedford Athletic	10 - 26	Whitchurch
	Report

Putnoe Woods

28 October 2000

Dudley Kingswinford	13 - 13	Tynedale
	Report

Heathbrook
Attendance: 250
Referee: Alan Biggs

28 October 2000

Morley	15 - 23	Sedgley Park
	Report

Scatcherd Lane
Attendance: 250
Referee: Rob Sheard

28 October 2000

Sandal	5 - 48	New Brighton
	Report

Milnthorpe Green

28 October 2000

Stourbridge	26 - 19	Liverpool St Helens
	Report

Stourton Park
Attendance: 400
Referee: Nick Williams

28 October 2000

Walsall	5 - 19	Doncaster
	Report

Broadway Ground
Attendance: 250
Referee: Tony Rossall

=== Round 7 ===
4 November 2000

Doncaster	17 - 16	Stourbridge
	Report

Castle Park
Attendance: 900
Referee: David Pearson

4 November 2000

Liverpool St Helens	21 - 13	Sandal
	Report

Moss Lane
Attendance: 250
Referee: Tim Wigglesworth

4 November 2000

Nuneaton	50 - 27	Morley
	Report

Liberty Way
Attendance: 250
Referee: D Edmunds

4 November 2000

Sedgley Park	37 - 5	Dudley Kingswinford
	Report

Park Lane
Attendance: 200
Referee: Doug Chapman

4 November 2000

Whitchurch	20 - 13	Walsall
	Report

Edgeley Park
Attendance: 350
Referee: David Helme

4 November 2000

New Brighton	P - P	Aspatria

- Postponed. Game rescheduled to 3 February 2001.

4 November 2000

Tynedale	P - P	Bedford Athletic

- Postponed. Game rescheduled to 3 February 2001.

=== Round 8 ===
11 November 2000

Doncaster	32 - 17	Bedford Athletic
	Report

Castle Park
Attendance: 450
Referee: Charles Palmer

11 November 2000

Liverpool St Helens	33 - 20	Walsall
	Report

Moss Lane
Attendance: 250
Referee: Paul Dix

11 November 2000

New Brighton	27 - 18	Stourbridge
	Report

Hartsfield
Attendance: 400
Referee: Rob Sheard

11 November 2000

Sandal	15 - 29	Aspatria
	Report

Milnthorpe Green

11 November 2000

Sedgley Park	57 - 3	Nuneaton
	Report

Park Lane
Attendance: 250
Referee: Chris Sharp

11 November 2000

Tynedale	9 - 5	Morley
	Report

Tynedale Park

11 November 2000

Whitchurch	13 - 11	Dudley Kingswinford
	Report

Edgeley Park
Attendance: 300
Referee: Andrew Canning

=== Round 9 ===
18 November 2000

Aspatria	10 - 21	Sedgley Park
	Report

Bower Park
Attendance: 100
Referee: Tony Rossall

18 November 2000

Bedford Athletic	19 - 20	Liverpool St Helens
	Report

Putnoe Woods
Attendance: 400
Referee: R Francis

18 November 2000

Dudley Kingswinford	33 - 3	Doncaster
	Report

Heathbrook
Attendance: 350
Referee: Richard Parker-Sedgmore

18 November 2000

Morley	8 - 26	Whitchurch
	Report

Scatcherd Lane
Attendance: 400
Referee: Chris Sharp

18 November 2000

Nuneaton	29 - 9	Tynedale
	Report

Liberty Way
Attendance: 150
Referee: Paul Dix

18 November 2000

Stourbridge	65 - 10	Sandal
	Report

Stourton Park
Attendance: 300
Referee: Alan Biggs

18 November 2000

Walsall	10 - 16	New Brighton
	Report

Broadway Ground
Attendance: 325
Referee: Anthony Ellison

=== Round 10 ===
25 November 2000

Doncaster	25 - 15	Morley
	Report

Castle Park
Attendance: 850
Referee: David Matthews

25 November 2000

Liverpool St Helens	14 - 36	Dudley Kingswinford
	Report

Moss Lane
Attendance: 150
Referee: Rob Sheard

25 November 2000

New Brighton	31 - 7	Bedford Athletic
	Report

Hartsfield
Attendance: 250
Referee: Tim Wigglesworth

25 November 2000

Sandal	39 - 30	Walsall
	Report

Milnthorpe Green

25 November 2000

Stourbridge	33 - 10	Aspatria
	Report

Stourton Park
Attendance: 350
Referee: Doug Chapman

25 November 2000

Tynedale	8 - 18	Sedgley Park
	Report

Tynedale Park
Attendance: 200
Referee: David Helme

25 November 2000

Whitchurch	23 - 10	Nuneaton
	Report

Edgeley Park
Attendance: 530
Referee: S Makinson

=== Round 11 ===
2 December 2000

Aspatria	8 - 26	Tynedale
	Report

Bower Park
Attendance: 100
Referee: Chris Sharp

2 December 2000

Bedford Athletic	24 - 19	Sandal
	Report

Putnoe Woods
Referee: Ian Langley

2 December 2000

Dudley Kingswinford	11 - 24	New Brighton
	Report

Heathbrook
Attendance: 450
Referee: Paul Dix

2 December 2000

Morley	31 - 24	Liverpool St Helens
	Report

Scatcherd Lane
Attendance: 400
Referee: Alan Hughes

2 December 2000

Nuneaton	22 - 5	Doncaster
	Report

Liberty Way
Attendance: 200
Referee: S Terheege

2 December 2000

Sedgley Park	59 - 3	Whitchurch
	Report

Park Lane
Attendance: 200
Referee: Alan Biggs

2 December 2000

Walsall	P - P	Stourbridge

- Postponed. Game rescheduled to 3 February 2001.

=== Round 12 ===
9 December 2000

Doncaster	18 - 13	Sedgley Park
	Report

Castle Park
Attendance: 800
Referee: Tim Wigglesworth

9 December 2000

Liverpool St Helens	27 - 15	Nuneaton
	Report

Moss Lane
Attendance: 250
Referee: Rob Sawyer

9 December 2000

New Brighton	79 - 0	Morley
	Report

Hartsfield
Attendance: 350
Referee: Mark Wilson

9 December 2000

Whitchurch	21 - 11	Tynedale
	Report

Edgeley Park
Attendance: 425
Referee: Rob Sheard

9 December 2000

Sandal	P - P	Dudley Kingswinford

- Postponed. Game rescheduled to 17 February 2001.

9 December 2000

Stourbridge	P - P	Bedford Athletic

- Postponed. Game rescheduled to 17 February 2001.

9 December 2000

Walsall	P - P	Aspatria

- Postponed. Game rescheduled to 17 February 2001.

=== Round 13 ===
16 December 2000

Aspatria	19 - 12	Whitchurch
	Report

Bower Park

16 December 2000

Bedford Athletic	24 - 16	Walsall
	Report

Putnoe Woods
Attendance: 200

16 December 2000

Dudley Kingswinford	14 - 29	Stourbridge
	Report

Heathbrook
Attendance: 1,500
Referee: Wayne Barnes

16 December 2000

Morley	29 - 25	Sandal
	Report

Scatcherd Lane
Attendance: 400
Referee: Doug Chapman

16 December 2000

Sedgley Park	43 - 13	Liverpool St Helens
	Report

Park Lane
Attendance: 350
Referee: Nick Williams

16 December 2000

Nuneaton	P - P	New Brighton

- Postponed. Game rescheduled to 3 March 2001.

16 December 2000

Tynedale	P - P	Doncaster

- Postponed. Game rescheduled to 17 February 2001.

=== Round 14 ===
23 December 2000

Doncaster	38 - 11	Nuneaton
	Report

Castle Park
Attendance: 800
Referee: S Makinson

23 December 2000

Liverpool St Helens	34 - 18	Morley
	Report

Moss Lane
Attendance: 200
Referee: Chris Sharp

23 December 2000

New Brighton	32 - 13	Dudley Kingswinford
	Report

Hartsfield
Attendance: 350
Referee: Doug Chapman

23 December 2000

Sandal	26 - 18	Bedford Athletic
	Report

Milnthorpe Green

23 December 2000

Stourbridge	46 - 6	Walsall
	Report

Stourton Park
Attendance: 450
Referee: Richard Parker-Sedgmore

23 December 2000

Tynedale	33 - 20	Aspatria
	Report

Tynedale Park
Attendance: 200
Referee: Chris Seeley

23 December 2000

Whitchurch	14 - 39	Sedgley Park
	Report

Edgeley Park
Attendance: 415
Referee: Rob Sawyer

=== Round 15 ===
30 December 2000

Aspatria	P - P	Stourbridge

- Postponed. Game rescheduled to 3 March 2001.

30 December 2000

Bedford Athletic	P - P	New Brighton

- Postponed. Game rescheduled to ?.

30 December 2000

Dudley Kingswinford	P - P	Liverpool St Helens

- Postponed. Game rescheduled to 3 February 2001.

30 December 2000

Morley	P - P	Doncaster

- Postponed. Game rescheduled to 3 February 2001.

30 December 2000

Nuneaton	P - P	Whitchurch

- Postponed. Game rescheduled to 3 February 2001.

30 December 2000

Sedgley Park	P - P	Tynedale

- Postponed. Game rescheduled to 3 March 2001.

30 December 2000

Walsall	P - P	Sandal

- Postponed. Game rescheduled to 3 March 2001.

=== Round 16 ===
6 January 2001

Doncaster	46 - 7	Dudley Kingswinford
	Report

Castle Park
Attendance: 700
Referee: Tony Rossall

6 January 2001

Liverpool St Helens	26 - 20	Bedford Athletic
	Report

Moss Lane

6 January 2001

New Brighton	35 - 26	Walsall
	Report

Hartsfield

6 January 2001

Sandal	27 - 47	Stourbridge
	Report

Milnthorpe Green

6 January 2001

Sedgley Park	57 - 3	Aspatria
	Report

Park Lane
Attendance: 200

6 January 2001

Tynedale	10 - 20	Nuneaton
	Report

Tynedale Park

6 January 2001

Whitchurch	34 - 16	Morley
	Report

Edgeley Park

=== Round 17 ===
13 January 2001

Bedford Athletic	0 - 18	Doncaster
	Report

Putnoe Woods
Referee: Paul Dickens

13 January 2001

Dudley Kingswinford	29 - 19	Whitchurch
	Report

Heathbrook

13 January 2001

Morley	23 - 11	Tynedale
	Report

Scatcherd Lane

13 January 2001

Nuneaton	56 - 17	Sedgley Park
	Report

Liberty Way
Attendance: 250
Referee: David Helme

13 January 2001

Stourbridge	31 - 10	New Brighton
	Report

Stourton Park
Attendance: 800
Referee: David Matthews

13 January 2001

Walsall	48 - 15	Liverpool St Helens
	Report

Broadway Ground
Referee: Doug Chapman

13 January 2001

Aspatria	P - P	Sandal

- Postponed. Game rescheduled to 7 April 2001.

=== Round 18 ===
20 January 2001

New Brighton	35 - 28	Sandal
	Report

Hartsfield

20 January 2001

Nuneaton	33 - 22	Aspatria
	Report

Liberty Way
Referee: R Francis

20 January 2001

Doncaster	P - P	Walsall

- Postponed. Game rescheduled to 7 April 2001.

20 January 2001

Liverpool St Helens	P - P	Stourbridge

- Postponed. Game rescheduled to 21 April 2001.

20 January 2001

Sedgley Park	P - P	Morley

- Postponed. Game rescheduled to 17 February 2001.

20 January 2001

Tynedale	C - C	Dudley Kingswinford

- Game initially postponed but would ultimately be cancelled due to foot & mouth crisis in northern England cutting short Tynedale's season and leading to them being relegated.

20 January 2001

Whitchurch	P - P	Bedford Athletic

- Postponed. Game rescheduled to 3 March 2001.

=== Round 19 ===
27 January 2001

Aspatria	20 - 36	New Brighton
	Report

Bower Park

27 January 2001

Bedford Athletic	29 - 22	Tynedale
	Report

Putnoe Woods
Attendance: 150
Referee: Andrew Tong

27 January 2001

Dudley Kingswinford	11 - 23	Sedgley Park
	Report

Heathbrook
Attendance: 350
Referee: Nigel Higginson

27 January 2001

Morley	26 - 16	Nuneaton
	Report

Scatcherd Lane
Attendance: 400
Referee: Andrew Canning

27 January 2001

Sandal	22 - 34	Liverpool St Helens
	Report

Milnthorpe Green

27 January 2001

Stourbridge	13 - 10	Doncaster
	Report

Stourton Park
Attendance: 900
Referee: Tony Spreadbury

27 January 2001

Walsall	38 - 30	Whitchurch
	Report

Broadway Ground

=== Rounds 3, 7, 11 & 15 (rescheduled games) ===
3 February 2001

Dudley Kingswinford	44 - 31	Liverpool St Helens
	Report

Heathbrook
Attendance: 350
Referee: Wayne Barnes

- Game rescheduled from 30 December 2000.

3 February 2001

Morley	22 - 5	Doncaster
	Report

Scatcherd Lane
Referee: David Helme

- Game rescheduled from 30 December 2000.

3 February 2001

New Brighton	45 - 8	Aspatria
	Report

Hartsfield
Attendance: 300

- Game rescheduled from 4 November 2000.

3 February 2001

Nuneaton	41 - 13	Whitchurch
	Report

Liberty Way
Referee: Rob Sawyer

- Game rescheduled from 30 December 2000.

3 February 2001

Sedgley Park	47 - 16	Sandal
	Report

Park Lane
Attendance: 250
Referee: S Makinson

- Game rescheduled from 16 September 2000.

3 February 2001

Tynedale	24 - 10	Bedford Athletic
	Report

Tynedale Park
Attendance: 200
Referee: Alan Hughes

- Game rescheduled from 4 November 2000.

3 February 2001

Walsall	22 - 25	Stourbridge
	Report

Broadway Ground
Attendance: 500
Referee: S Terheege

- Game rescheduled from 2 December 2000.

=== Round 20 ===
10 February 2001

Liverpool St Helens	17 - 21	New Brighton
	Report

Moss Lane
Attendance: 250

10 February 2001

Nuneaton	29 - 0	Dudley Kingswinford
	Report

Liberty Way
Attendance: 200
Referee: Paul Dickens

10 February 2001

Sedgley Park	69 - 0	Bedford Athletic
	Report

Park Lane

10 February 2001

Whitchurch	10 - 17	Stourbridge
	Report

Edgeley Park
Attendance: 540
Referee: Doug Chapman

10 February 2001

Doncaster	P - P	Sandal

- Game brought forward to 23 September 2000.

10 February 2001

Morley	C - C	Aspatria

- Game initially postponed but would ultimately be cancelled due to foot & mouth crisis in northern England cutting short Aspatria's season and leading to them being relegated.

10 February 2001

Tynedale	C - C	Walsall

- Game initially postponed but would ultimately be cancelled due to foot & mouth crisis in northern England cutting short Tynedale's season and leading to them being relegated.

=== Rounds 12, 13 & 18 (rescheduled games) ===
17 February 2001

Sandal	39 - 21	Dudley Kingswinford
	Report

Milnthorpe Green
Referee: David Helme

- Game rescheduled from 9 December 2000.

17 February 2001

Sedgley Park	63 - 7	Morley
	Report

Park Lane
Attendance: 270
Referee: Alan Hughes

- Game rescheduled from 20 January 2001.

17 February 2001

Stourbridge	37 - 20	Bedford Athletic
	Report

Stourton Park
Attendance: 200
Referee: D May

- Game rescheduled from 9 December 2000.

17 February 2001

Tynedale	0 - 6	Doncaster
	Report

Tynedale Park

- Game rescheduled from 16 December 2000.

17 February 2001

Walsall	51 - 14	Aspatria
	Report

Broadway Ground

- Game rescheduled from 9 December 2000.

=== Round 21 ===
24 February 2001

Aspatria	30 - 19	Liverpool St Helens
	Report

Bower Park

24 February 2001

Bedford Athletic	8 - 25	Nuneaton
	Report

Putnoe Woods

24 February 2001

Dudley Kingswinford	20 - 3	Morley
	Report

Heathbrook
Referee: Chris Seeley

24 February 2001

New Brighton	18 - 16	Doncaster
	Report

Hartsfield
Referee: David Pearson

24 February 2001

Sandal	22 - 17	Whitchurch
	Report

Milnthorpe Green
Attendance: 250

24 February 2001

Stourbridge	18 - 0	Tynedale
	Report

Stourton Park
Attendance: 400
Referee: D Edmunds

24 February 2001

Walsall	29 - 34	Sedgley Park
	Report

Broadway Ground
Attendance: 250
Referee: Ian Langley

=== Rounds 13, 15 & 18 (rescheduled games) ===
3 March 2001

Nuneaton	20 - 8	New Brighton
	Report

Liberty Way

- Game rescheduled from 16 December 2000.

3 March 2001

Aspatria	P - P	Stourbridge

- Game initially rescheduled from 30 December 2000 but would be postponed again until 28 April 2001.

3 March 2001

Sedgley Park	P - P	Tynedale

- Game initially rescheduled from 30 December 2000 but would be postponed again until 28 April 2001.

3 March 2001

Walsall	P - P	Sandal

- Game initially rescheduled from 30 December 2000 but would be postponed again until 14 April 2001.

3 March 2001

Whitchurch	C - C	Bedford Athletic

- Game initially rescheduled from 20 January 2001 but would be ultimately cancelled due to fixture congestion.

=== Round 22 ===
10 March 2001

Doncaster	8 - 23	Liverpool St Helens
	Report

Castle Park
Attendance: 800

10 March 2001

Dudley Kingswinford	47 - 20	Aspatria
	Report

Heathbrook
Attendance: 450
Referee: R Glynne Jones

10 March 2001

Morley	35 - 14	Bedford Athletic
	Report

Scatcherd Lane
Referee: Tony Rossall

10 March 2001

Nuneaton	34 - 42	Walsall
	Report

Liberty Way
Referee: S Makinson

10 March 2001

Sedgley Park	39 - 20	Stourbridge
	Report

Park Lane
Attendance: 800
Referee: David Matthews

10 March 2001

Tynedale	P - P	Sandal

- Postponed. Game rescheduled to 5 May 2001.

10 March 2001

Whitchurch	P - P	New Brighton

- Postponed. Game rescheduled to 19 May 2001.

=== Round 23 ===
17 March 2001

Liverpool St Helens	35 - 7	Whitchurch
	Report

Moss Lane

17 March 2001

Sandal	19 - 66	Sedgley Park
	Report

Milnthorpe Green
Attendance: 300
Referee: Alan Hughes

17 March 2001

Stourbridge	13 - 13	Nuneaton
	Report

Stourton Park
Attendance: 400
Referee: Nick Williams

17 March 2001

Aspatria	P - P	Doncaster

- Postponed. Game rescheduled to ?.

17 March 2001

Bedford Athletic	P - P	Dudley Kingswinford

- Postponed. Game rescheduled to 28 April 2001.

17 March 2001

New Brighton	C - C	Tynedale

- Game initially postponed but would ultimately be cancelled due to foot & mouth crisis in northern England cutting short Tynedale's season and leading to them being relegated.

17 March 2001

Walsall	P - P	Morley

- Postponed. Game rescheduled to 21 April 2001.

=== Round 24 ===
24 March 2001

Dudley Kingswinford	21 - 18	Walsall
	Report

Heathbrook
Attendance: 800
Referee: Steve Harland

24 March 2001

Morley	16 - 40	Stourbridge
	Report

Scatcherd Lane
Attendance: 300
Referee: Tim Wigglesworth

24 March 2001

Nuneaton	53 - 17	Sandal
	Report

Liberty Way

24 March 2001

Sedgley Park	26 - 10	New Brighton
	Report

Park Lane
Attendance: 1,200
Referee: R Glynne Jones

24 March 2001

Bedford Athletic	P - P	Aspatria

- Postponed. Game rescheduled to 19 May 2001.

24 March 2001

Tynedale	P - P	Liverpool St Helens

- Postponed. Game rescheduled to 19 May 2001.

24 March 2001

Whitchurch	P - P	Doncaster

- Postponed. Game rescheduled to 5 May 2001.

=== Round 25 ===
31 March 2001

Liverpool St Helens	5 - 20	Sedgley Park
	Report

Moss Lane
Attendance: 150
Referee: S Makinson

31 March 2001

New Brighton	37 - 0	Nuneaton
	Report

Hartsfield

31 March 2001

Sandal	29 - 27	Morley
	Report

Milnthorpe Green
Referee: Chris Sharp

31 March 2001

Stourbridge	27 - 12	Dudley Kingswinford
	Report

Stourton Park
Attendance: 1,500
Referee: Rob Debney

31 March 2001

Walsall	10 - 15	Bedford Athletic
	Report

Broadway Ground

31 March 2001

Doncaster	P - P	Tynedale

- Postponed. Game rescheduled to 26 May 2001.

31 March 2001

Whitchurch	P - P	Aspatria

- Postponed. Game rescheduled to 26 May 2001.

=== Rounds 15, 17 & 18 (rescheduled games) ===
7 April 2001

Doncaster	39 - 22	Walsall
	Report

Castle Park
Referee: Stuart Piercy

- Game rescheduled from 20 January 2001.

7 April 2001

Aspatria	C - C	Sandal

- Game initially postponed but would ultimately be cancelled due to foot & mouth crisis in northern England cutting short Aspatria's season and leading to them being relegated.

7 April 2001

Bedford Athletic	P - P	New Brighton

- Game initially rescheduled from 30 December 2000 but postponed again till 5 May 2001.

=== Round 26 (includes rescheduled game) ===
14 April 2001

Bedford Athletic	13 - 27	Stourbridge
	Report

Putnoe Woods

14 April 2001

Morley	18 - 31	New Brighton
	Report

Scatcherd Lane

14 April 2001

Nuneaton	46 - 22	Liverpool St Helens
	Report

Liberty Way

14 April 2001

Sedgley Park	13 - 10	Doncaster
	Report

Park Lane
Attendance: 1,000
Referee: David Matthews

14 April 2001

Walsall	35 - 37	Sandal
	Report

Broadway Ground

- Game initially rescheduled from 30 December 2000, then 3 March 2001.

14 April 2001

Dudley Kingswinford	P - P	Aspatria

- Postponed. Game rescheduled to 5 May 2001.

14 April 2001

Tynedale	C - C	Whitchurch

- Game initially postponed but would ultimately be cancelled due to foot & mouth crisis in northern England cutting short Tynedale's season and leading to them being relegated.

=== Rounds 18 & 23 (rescheduled games) ===
21 April 2001

Liverpool St Helens	16 - 48	Stourbridge
	Report

Moss Lane

- Game rescheduled from 20 January 2001.

21 April 2001

Walsall	27 - 13	Morley
	Report

Broadway Ground
Referee: Doug Chapman

- Game rescheduled from 7 March 2001.

=== Rounds 15 & 23 (rescheduled games) ===
28 April 2001

Bedford Athletic	27 - 22	Dudley Kingswinford
	Report

Putnoe Woods
Attendance: 150
Referee: Tony Rossall

- Game rescheduled from 17 March 2001.

28 April 2001

Aspatria	C - C	Stourbridge

- Game initially rescheduled from 30 December 2000 and then 3 March 2001 before finally being cancelled due to foot & mouth crisis in northern England cutting short Aspatria's season and leading to them being relegated.

28 April 2001

Sedgley Park	C - C	Tynedale

- Game initially rescheduled from 30 December 2000 and then 3 March 2001 before finally being cancelled due to foot & mouth crisis in northern England cutting short Tynedale's season and leading to them being relegated.

=== Rounds 22 & 24 & ? (rescheduled games) ===
5 May 2001

Bedford Athletic	23 - 20	New Brighton
	Report

- Game initially rescheduled from 30 December 2000 and then again from 7 April 2001.

5 May 2001

Dudley Kingswinford	C - C	Aspatria

- Game rescheduled from 14 April 2001 but would ultimately be cancelled due to foot & mouth crisis in northern England cutting short Aspatria's season and leading to them being relegated.

5 May 2001

Tynedale	C - C	Sandal

- Game rescheduled from 10 March 2001 but would ultimately be cancelled due to foot & mouth crisis in northern England cutting short Tynedale's season and leading to them being relegated.

5 May 2001

Whitchurch	C - C	Doncaster

- Game rescheduled from 24 March 2001 but would ultimately be cancelled due to fixture congestion.

=== Rounds 22 & 24 (rescheduled games) ===
19 May 2001

Bedford Athletic	C - C	Aspatria

- Game initially rescheduled from 24 March 2001 but would ultimately be cancelled due to foot & mouth crisis in northern England cutting short Aspatria's season and leading to them being relegated.

19 May 2001

Tynedale	C - C	Liverpool St Helens

- Game initially rescheduled from 24 March 2001 but would ultimately be cancelled due to foot & mouth crisis in northern England cutting short Tynedale's season and leading to them being relegated.

19 May 2001

Whitchurch	C - C	New Brighton

- Game initially rescheduled from 10 March 2001 but ultimately cancelled due to fixture congestion.

=== Round 25 (rescheduled games) ===
26 May 2001

Doncaster	C - C	Tynedale

- Game initially rescheduled from 31 March 2001 but would ultimately be cancelled due to foot & mouth crisis in northern England cutting short Tynedale's season and leading to them being relegated.

26 May 2001

Whitchurch	C - C	Aspatria

- Game initially rescheduled from 31 March 2001 but would ultimately be cancelled due to foot & mouth crisis in northern England cutting short Aspatria's season and leading to them being relegated.

=== Promotion play-off ===
The league runners up of National Division Three North and South would meet in a playoff game for promotion to National Division Two. Sedgley Park were runners-up in the north and because they had a better league record than south runners-up, Launceston, they hosted the play-off match.

26 May 2001

Sedgley Park	40 - 23	Launceston
	Report

Park Lane
Attendance: 1,500
Referee: Paul Dix

== Total season attendances ==
- Not including promotion playoff game.

Club	Home Games	Total	Average	Highest	Lowest	% Capacity
Aspatria	5 (Note: Missing home attendance v Nuneaton on 28 October 2000, Whitchurch on 16 December 2000, New Brighton on 27 January 2001 and Liverpool St Helens on 24 February 2001.)	725	145	200	100	5%
Bedford Athletic	6 (Note: Missing home attendance v Whitchurch on 28 October 2000, Sandal on 2 December 2000, Doncaster on 13 January 2001, Nuneaton on 24 February 2001, Stourbridge on 14 April 2001 and New Brighton on 5 May 2001.)	1,450	242	400	150	48%
Doncaster	9 (Note: Missing home attendance v Sandal on 23 September 2000, New Brighton on 30 September 2000 and Walsall on 7 April 2000.)	6,215	691	900	265	22%
Dudley Kingswinford	10 (Note: Missing home attendance v Whitchurch on 13 January 2001 and Morley on 24 February 2001.)	5,500	550	1,500	250	24%
Liverpool St Helens	9 (Note: Missing home attendances v Aspatria on 30 September 2000, Bedford Athletic on 6 January 2001, Whitchurch on 17 March 2001 and Stourbridge on 21 April 2001.)	1,900	211	250	150	5%
Morley	6 (Note: Missing home attendances v Tynedale on 13 January 2001, Doncaster on 3 February 2001, Bedford Athletic on 10 March 2001 and New Brighton on 14 April 2001.)	2,200	367	450	250	6%
New Brighton	8 (Note: Missing home attendances v Walsall on 6 January 2001, Sandal on 20 January 2001, Doncaster on 24 February 2001 and Nuneaton on 31 March 2001.)	2,650	331	600	200	17%
Nuneaton	5 (Note: Missing home attendances v Stourbridge on 16 September 2000, Bedford Athletic on 30 September 2000, Aspatria on 20 January 2001, Whitchurch on 3 February 2001, New Brighton 3 March 2001, Walsall on 10 March 2001, Sandal on 24 March 2001 and Liverpool St Helens on 14 April 2001.)	1,050	210	250	150	6%
Sandal	4 (Note: Missing home attendances v Tynedale on 10 September 2000, New Brighton on 28 October 2000, Aspatria on 11 November 2000, Walsall on 25 November 2000, Bedford Athletic on 23 December 2000, Stourbridge on 6 January 2001, Liverpool St Helens on 27 January 2001, Dudley Kingswinford on 17 February 2001 and Morley on 31 March 2001.)	700	233	250	200	
Sedgley Park	11 (Note: Missing home attendance v Bedford Athletic on 10 February 2001.)	5,020	456	1,200	200	15%
Stourbridge	13	6,950	535	1,500	200	15%
Tynedale	4 (Note: Missing home attendances v Stourbridge on 30 September 2000, Morley on 11 November 2000, Nuneaton on 6 January 2001 and Doncaster on 17 February 2001.)	850	213	250	200	11%
Walsall	7 (Note: Missing home attendances v Liverpool St Helens on 13 January 2001, Whitchurch on 27 January 2001, Aspatria on 17 February 2001, Bedford Athletic on 31 March 2001, Sandal on 14 April 2001 and Morley on 21 April 2001.)	2,345	335	500	200	15%
Whitchurch	8 (Note: Missing home attendance v Morley on 6 January 2001.)	3,310	414	540	300	

== Individual statistics ==
- Note that points scorers includes tries as well as conversions, penalties and drop goals.

=== Top points scorers ===
Rank	Player	Team	Appearances	Points
1	(England) Paul Brett	New Brighton	24	298
2	(England) Colin Stephens	Sedgley Park	21	264
3	(England) Simon Worsley	Liverpool St Helens	24	259
4	(England) John Liley	Doncaster	22	249
5	(England) Steve Smart	Dudley Kingswinford	23	247
5	(England) Duncan Hughes	Stourbridge	25	247
6	(England) Dave Evans	Morley	25	182
7	(England) Mike Crisp	Walsall	22	181
8	(England) Alan Moses	Tynedale	17	179
9	(England) John Canney	Whitchurch	21	153

=== Top try scorers ===
Rank	Player	Team	Appearances	Tries
1	(England) Gary Marshall	Nuneaton	24	20
2	(England) Mike Wilcock	Sedgley Park	23	18
3	(England) Steve Bellis	New Brighton	24	16
4	(England) Duncan Hughes	Stourbridge	25	15
4	(England) Jamie Barker	Sandal	24	15
5	(England) Rob Moon	Sedgley Park	23	14
6	(England) Derek Eves	Doncaster	23	13
6	(England) Paul Morris	Sedgley Park	23	13
6	(England) Geoff Jones	New Brighton	24	13
6	(Wales) Emrys Evans	New Brighton	24	13

== Season records ==
=== Team ===
Largest home win — 79 pts

79 - 0 New Brighton at home to Morley on 9 December 2000

Largest away win — 42 pts

53 - 11 Doncaster away to Sandal on 14 October 2000

Most points scored — 79 pts

79 - 0 New Brighton at home to Morley on 9 December 2000

Most tries in a match — 13

New Brighton at home to Morley on 9 December 2000

Most conversions in a match — 13

New Brighton at home to Morley on 9 December 2000

Most penalties in a match — 7

Tynedale away to Liverpool St Helens on 2 September 2000

Most drop goals in a match — 2

Liverpool St Helens away to Bedford Athletic on 18 November 2000

=== Player ===
Most points in a match — 34

(England) Paul Brett for New Brighton at home to Morley on 9 December 2000

Most tries in a match — 4 (x2)

(England) Mike Wilcox for Sedgley Park at home to Whitchurch on 2 December 2000
(England) Steve Belis for New Brighton at home to Morley on 9 December 2000

Most conversions in a match — 13

(England) Paul Brett for New Brighton at home to Morley on 9 December 2000

Most penalties in a match — 7

(England) Alan Moses for Tynedale away to Liverpool St Helens on 2 September 2000

Most drop goals in a match — 2

(England) Simon Worsley for Liverpool St Helens away to Bedford Athletic on 18 November 2000

=== Attendances ===
Highest — 1,500 (x2)

Dudley Kingswinford at home to Stourbridge on 16 December 2000
Stourbridge at home to Dudley Kingswinford on 31 March 2001

Lowest — 100 (x2)

Aspatria at home to Sedgley Park on 18 November 2000
Aspatria at home to Tynedale on 2 December 2000

Highest Average Attendance — 691

Doncaster

Lowest Average Attendance — 145

Aspatria

== See also ==
- 2000–01 Premiership Rugby
- 2000–01 National Division One
- 2000–01 National Division Two
- 2000–01 National Division Three South
