= 1991–92 National Division 4 North =

Rugby union competition in England

- Countries: England
- Champions: Aspatria (1st title)
- Runners-up: Hereford (not promoted)
- Relegated: Northern, Vale of Lune
- Matches played: 110

The 1991–92 National Division 4 North was the fifth full season of rugby union within the fourth tier of the English league system, currently known as National League 2 North, and counterpart to the National Division 4 South (now National League 2 South). At the end of the season, newly promoted Aspatria made it a second promotion in a row by qualifying for the 1992–93 National Division 3, 1 point clear of Hereford.

At the other end of the table, Northern and Vale of Lune were the two sides to go down. Vale of Lune were the more competitive, finishing dead level with Walsall on 7 points each, but in the end a worse for/against record condemned the Lancaster side to their second relegation in a row. Both Northern and Vale of Lune would drop to North 1.

== Structure ==
Each team played one match against each of the other teams, playing a total of ten matches each. The champions are promoted to National Division 3 and the bottom team was relegated to either North 1 or Midlands 1 depending on their locality.

== Participating teams and locations ==
Locations of the 1991–92 National Division 4 North teams

Team	Ground	Capacity	City/Area	Previous Season
Aspatria	Bower Park	3,000 (300 seats)	Aspatria, Cumbria	Promoted from North 1 (1st)
Durham City	Hollow Drift	3,000 (500 seats)	Durham, County Durham	10th
Kendal	Mint Bridge	4,600 (600 seats)	Kendal, Cumbria	5th
Harrogate	Claro Road	4,500 (500 seats)	Harrogate, North Yorkshire	6th
Hereford	Wyeside	3,200 (200 seats)	Hereford, Herefordshire	11th
Lichfield	Cooke Fields	5,460 (460 seats)	Lichfield, Staffordshire	2nd (not promoted)
Northern	McCracken Park	1,200 (200 seats)	Newcastle upon Tyne, Tyne and Wear	7th
Preston Grasshoppers	Lightfoot Green	2,250 (250 seats)	Preston, Lancashire	3rd
Stourbridge	Stourton Park	2,000	Stourbridge, West Midlands	8th
Towcestrians	Greens Norton Road		Towchester, Northamptonshire	Promoted from Midlands 1 (1st)
Vale of Lune	Powder House Lane	9,860 (360 seats)	Lancaster, Lancashire	Relegated from National 3 (13th)
Walsall	Broadway	2,500 (500 seats)	Walsall, West Midlands	9th
Winnington Park	Burrows Hill	5,000	Norwich, Cheshire	4th

== League table ==
1991–92 National Division 4 North table
Pos	Team	Pld	W	D	L	PF	PA	PD	Pts	Qualification
1	Aspatria (C)	12	11	0	1	253	100	+153	22	Promoted
2	Hereford	12	10	1	1	223	133	+90	21	
3	Kendal	12	8	1	3	157	123	+34	17	
4	Preston Grasshoppers	12	8	0	4	195	123	+72	16	
5	Lichfield	12	6	1	5	174	177	−3	13	
6	Stourbridge	12	6	0	6	163	137	+26	12	
7	Harrogate	12	6	0	6	170	175	−5	12	
8	Winnington Park	12	4	1	7	159	173	−14	9	
9	Towcestrians	12	4	0	8	123	153	−30	8	
10	Durham City	12	4	0	8	133	215	−82	8	
11	Walsall	12	3	1	8	139	187	−48	7	
12	Vale of Lune (R)	12	3	1	8	119	185	−66	7	Relegated
13	Northern (R)	12	2	0	10	105	232	−127	4	Relegated

Rules for classification: Points are awarded as follows: 2 pts for a win, 1 pt for a draw, 0 pts for a loss. If teams are level at any stage, difference between points for and against applies.
(C) Champions; (R) Relegated

== Sponsorship ==
Division 4 North is part of the Courage Clubs Championship and was sponsored by Courage Brewery.

== See also ==
- 1991–92 National Division 1
- 1991–92 National Division 2
- 1991–92 National Division 3
- 1991–92 National Division 4 South
