= 1990–91 National Division 4 South =

Rugby union competition in England

- Countries: England
- Champions: Redruth (1st title)
- Runners-up: Basingstoke
- Relegated: Cheltenham, Maidenhead
- Matches played: 156

The 1990–91 National Division 4 South was the fourth full season of rugby union within the fourth tier of the English league system, currently known as National League 2 South, and counterpart to the National Division 4 North (now National League 2 North). It was the first season for the division using the name National 4 South, having been known as Area League South the previous year. In what was otherwise a very competitive league, Redruth were dominant, finishing as league champions with a perfect record of 12 wins from 12 games to gain promotion to the 1991–92 National Division 3 - 6 points clear of runners up Basingstoke.

At the other end of the table Cheltenham and Maidenhead finished in the bottom two places and were relegated. It was especially tough on Maidenhead who finished level with 11th placed Maidstone on 9 points each but went down due to a worst for/against ratio. Both Cheltenham and Maidenhead would drop down to South West 1.

== Structure ==
Each team played one match against each of the other teams, playing a total of twelve matches each. The champions are promoted to National Division 3 and the bottom two teams are relegated to either London Division 1 or South West 1 depending on their locality.

== Participating teams and locations ==
Locations of the 1990–91 National Division 4 South teams

Team	Ground	Capacity	City/Area	Previous season
Basingstoke	Down Grange	2,500	Basingstoke, Hampshire	8th
Camborne	Recreation Ground	11,000	Camborne, Cornwall	4th
Cheltenham	Prince of Wales	3,500 (500 seats)	Cheltenham, Gloucestershire	9th
Ealing	Horsenden Hill		Horsenden Hill, Ealing, London	Promoted from London 1 (runners up)
Havant	Hook's Lane	3,000 (200 seats)	Havant, Hampshire	5th
London Welsh	Old Deer Park	4,500 (1,500 seats)	Richmond, London	Relegated from National 3 (12th)
Maidenhead	Braywick Park	1,750	Maidenhead, Berkshire	Promoted from South West 1 (champions)
Maidstone	William Davey Memorial	2,000 (100 seats)	Maidstone, Kent	10th
North Walsham	Norwich Road	1,200	Scottow, Norfolk	Promoted from London 1 (champions)
Redruth	Recreation Ground	12,000	Redruth, Cornwall	3rd
Southend	Warners Park	1,500 (150 seats)	Southend, Essex	7th
Sudbury	Moorsfield	1,000	Sudbury, Suffolk	6th
Weston-super-Mare	Recreation Ground	3,000	Weston-super-Mare, Somerset	Promoted from South West 1 (2nd)

== League table ==
1990–91 National Division 4 South table
Pos	Team	Pld	W	D	L	PF	PA	PD	Pts	Qualification
1	Redruth (C)	12	12	0	0	225	79	+146	24	Promotion place
2	Basingstoke	12	9	0	3	187	104	+83	18	
3	London Welsh	12	7	0	5	235	165	+70	14	
4	Camborne	12	6	0	6	204	179	+25	12	
5	Weston-super-Mare	12	6	0	6	192	182	+10	12	
6	North Walsham	12	5	2	5	170	180	−10	12	
7	Sudbury	12	6	0	6	160	172	−12	12	
8	Havant	12	5	0	7	157	173	−16	10	
9	Southend	12	5	0	7	152	194	−42	10	
10	Ealing	12	5	0	7	174	218	−44	10	
11	Maidstone	12	4	1	7	122	164	−42	9	
12	Maidenhead (R)	12	4	1	7	130	208	−78	9	Relegation place
13	Cheltenham (R)	12	2	0	10	150	240	−90	4	Relegation place

Rules for classification: Points are awarded as follows:
1. 2 pts for a win
2. 1 pt for a draw
3. 0 pts for a loss
4. If teams are level at any stage, difference between points for and against applies
  (C) Champions; (R) Relegated

== Sponsorship ==
National League 4 South is part of the Courage Clubs Championship and is sponsored by Courage Brewery.

== See also ==
- 1990–91 National Division 1
- 1990–91 National Division 2
- 1990–91 National Division 3
- 1990–91 National Division 4 North
