= 1990–91 National Division 1 =

Rugby union competition in England

- Countries: England
- Date: 22 September 1990 – 27 April 1991
- Champions: Bath (2nd title)
- Runners-up: Wasps
- Relegated: Moseley; Liverpool St Helens
- Matches played: 78
- Top point scorer: 126 – Rob Andrew (Wasps)
- Top try scorer: 9 – Andrew Harriman (Harlequins); Rory Underwood (Leicester)

The 1990–91 National Division 1 (sponsored by Courage Brewery) was the fourth season of the top tier of the English rugby union league system, the Courage Clubs Championship, currently known as Premiership Rugby. Wasps were the defending champions and Northampton and Liverpool St Helens the promoted sides.

Bath finished the season the champions for the second time, beating the holders Wasps by just one point. The two bottom sides, Moseley and Liverpool St Helens, were relegated to the 1991–92 National Division 2.

== Structure ==
The division increased from twelve teams to thirteen, each side playing the others once to make a total of twelve matches each. The bottom two teams would be relegated to National Division 2.

== Participating teams ==
Locations of the 1990–91 Courage League National Division One teams

Team	Stadium	Capacity	City/Area	Previous season
Bath	Recreation Ground	8,300 (1,000 seats)	Bath, Somerset	3rd
Bristol	Memorial Stadium	8,500 (1,200 seats)	Bristol, Avon	9th
Gloucester	Kingsholm	11,100 (1,100 seats)	Gloucester, Gloucestershire	2nd
Harlequins	The Stoop	9,000 (2,000 seats)	Twickenham, London	7th
Leicester	Welford Road	14,700 (9,200 seats)	Leicester, Leicestershire	5th
Liverpool St Helens	Moss Lane	4,370 (370 seats)	St Helens, Merseyside	Promoted from National 2 (2nd)
Moseley	The Reddings	9,999 (1,800 seats)	Birmingham, West Midlands	11th
Northampton	Franklin's Gardens	6,000 (2,000 seats)	Northampton, Northamptonshire	Promoted from National 2 (1st)
Nottingham	Ireland Avenue	4,990 (590 seats)	Beeston, Nottinghamshire	6th
Orrell	Edge Hall Road	5,300 (300 seats)	Orrell, Greater Manchester	8th
Rosslyn Park	The Rock	4,630 (630 seats)	Roehampton, London	10th
Saracens	Bramley Road	2,300 (300 seats)	Enfield, London	4th
Wasps	Repton Avenue	3,200 (1,200 seats)	Sudbury, London	Champions

== Table ==
Pos	Team	Pld	W	D	L	PF	PA	PD	Pts
1	Bath (C)	12	11	0	1	280	104	+176	22
2	Wasps	12	9	1	2	252	151	+101	19
3	Harlequins	12	8	0	4	267	162	+105	16
4	Leicester	12	8	0	4	244	140	+104	16
5	Orrell	12	7	0	5	247	105	+142	14
6	Gloucester	12	6	0	6	207	163	+44	12
7	Rosslyn Park	12	6	0	6	216	174	+42	12
8	Nottingham	12	6	0	6	138	194	−56	12
9	Northampton	12	5	1	6	149	254	−105	11
10	Saracens	12	5	0	7	151	228	−77	10
11	Bristol	12	4	1	7	135	219	−84	9
12	Moseley (R)	12	1	1	10	113	244	−131	3
13	Liverpool St Helens (R)	12	0	0	12	88	349	−261	0

(C) Champions; (R) Relegated

== Results ==
The home team is listed in the left column.

Home \ Away	BAT	BRI	GLO	HAR	LEI	LIV	MOS	NOR	NOT	ORR	ROS	SAR	WAS
Bath Rugby				23–3		46–3	11–6			17–9	45–21		15–16
Bristol	3–10		15–12		10–6				6–22	3–36		25–6	
Gloucester RFC	15–17			38–19			30–12		22–6	9–16		21–16	
Harlequins		38–16				41–12	33–6	21–6			18–6		12–18
Leicester	3–9		18–6	12–15					25–9	15–12		29–6	
Liverpool St Helens		6–7	7–26		7–28			13–23	12–13			3–17	
Moseley		9–9			19–43	20–12		10–16			9–19		9–22
Northampton	10–16	12–9	6–7		18–28				22–15			15–6	
Nottingham	9–22			6–19			12–7			16–12		3–28	12–10
Orrell				12–9		38–0	16–0	60–0			12–3		12–14
Rosslyn Park		16–13	17–12		17–15	39–9		48–0	9–15				
Saracens	6–49			7–39			21–6			19–12	13–11		
Wasps		46–19	14–9		12–22	51–4		21–21			13–10	15–6	

Legend: Blue = home team win; Yellow = draw; Red = away team win.

== Fixtures & Results ==
=== Round 1 ===
22 September 1990

Bath	46 – 3	Liverpool St Helens

Recreation Ground

22 September 1990

Bristol	6 – 22	Nottingham

Memorial Stadium

22 September 1990

Harlequins	12 – 18	Wasps

The Stoop

22 September 1990

Leicester	18 – 6	Gloucester

Welford Road
Referee: David Matthews

22 September 1990

Northampton	18 – 28	Saracens

Franklin's Gardens

22 September 1990

Orrell	12 – 3	Rosslyn Park

Edge Hall Road

Bye/s: Moseley

=== Round 2 ===
6 October 1990

Gloucester	30 – 12	Moseley

Kingsholm
Referee: Roger Quittenton

6 October 1990

Liverpool St Helens	13 – 23	Northampton

Moss Lane

6 October 1990

Nottingham	6 – 19	Harlequins

Ireland Avenue

6 October 1990

Rosslyn Park	16 – 13	Bristol

The Rock

6 October 1990

Saracens	12 – 19	Orrell

Bramley Road

6 October 1990

Wasps	12 – 22	Leicester

Repton Avenue

Bye/s: Bath

=== Round 3 ===
13 October 1990

Bristol	25 – 6	Saracens

Memorial Stadium

13 October 1990

Harlequins	18 – 6	Rosslyn Park

The Stoop

13 October 1990

Leicester	25 – 9	Nottingham

Welford Road

13 October 1990

Moseley	9 – 22	Wasps

The Reddings

13 October 1990

Northampton	15 – 6	Bath

Franklin's Gardens
Referee: F Howard

13 October 1990

Orrell	38 – 0	Liverpool St Helens

Edge Hall Road

Bye/s: Gloucester

=== Round 4 ===
20 October 1990

Bath	17 – 9	Orrell

Recreation Ground
Referee: Ed Morrison

20 October 1990

Liverpool St Helens	6 – 7	Bristol

Moss Lane

20 October 1990

Nottingham	12 – 7	Moseley

Ireland Avenue

20 October 1990

Rosslyn Park	17 – 15	Leicester

The Rock

20 October 1990

Saracens	7 – 39	Harlequins

Bramley Road

20 October 1990

Wasps	14 – 9	Gloucester

Repton Avenue
Referee: Tony Spreadbury

Bye/s: Northampton

=== Round 5 ===
27 October 1990

Bristol	9 – 22	Bath

Memorial Stadium
Attendance: 7,072

27 October 1990

Gloucester	22 – 6	Nottingham

Kingshom
Referee: Chris Rees

27 October 1990

Harlequins	41 – 12	Liverpool St Helens

The Stoop

27 October 1990

Leicester	29 – 6	Saracens

Welford Road

27 October 1990

Moseley	9 – 19	Rosslyn Park

The Reddings

27 October 1990

Orrell	60 – 0	Northampton

Edge Hall Road

Bye/s: Wasps

=== Round 6 ===
10 November 1990

Bath	23 – 3	Harlequins

Recreation Ground
Referee: S V Griffiths

10 November 1990

Liverpool St Helens	7 – 28	Leicester

Moss Lane

10 November 1990

Northampton	22 – 15	Bristol

Franklin's Gardens

10 November 1990

Nottingham	10 – 12	Wasps

Ireland Avenue

10 November 1990

Rosslyn Park	17 – 12	Gloucester

The Rock
Referee: G Davies

10 November 1990

Saracens	21 – 6	Moseley

Bramley Road

Bye/s: Orrell

=== Round 7 ===
17 November 1990

Bristol	3 – 36	Orrell

Memorial Ground

17 November 1990

Gloucester	21 – 16	Saracens

Kingsholm
Referee: S V Griffiths

17 November 1990

Harlequins	21 – 6	Northampton

The Stoop

17 November 1990

Leicester	3 – 9	Bath

Welford Road
Attendance: 11,500

17 November 1990

Moseley	20 – 12	Liverpool St Helens

The Reddings

17 November 1990

Wasps	13 – 10	Rosslyn Park

Repton Avenue

Bye/s: Nottingham

=== Round 8 ===
12 January 1991

Bath	11 – 6	Moseley

Recreation Ground
Referee: J Trigg

12 January 1991

Liverpool St Helens	7 – 26	Gloucester

Moss Lane
Referee: Tony Spreadbury

12 January 1991

Northampton	6 – 7	Leicester

Franklin's Gardens

12 January 1991

Orrell	12 – 9	Harlequins

Edge Hall Road

12 January 1991

Rosslyn Park	9 – 15	Nottingham

The Rock

12 January 1991

Saracens	6 – 15	Wasps

Bramley Road

Bye/s: Bristol

=== Round 9 ===
9 February 1991

Gloucester	15 – 17	Bath

Kingsholm
Referee: David Leslie

9 February 1991

Harlequins	38 – 16	Bristol

The Stoop

9 February 1991

Leicester	15 – 12	Orrell

Welford Road

9 February 1991

Moseley	10 – 16	Northampton

The Reddings

9 February 1991

Nottingham	3 – 28	Saracens

Ireland Avenue

9 February 1991

Wasps	51 – 4	Liverpool St Helens

Repton Avenue

Bye/s: Rosslyn Park

=== Round 10 ===
9 March 1991

Bath	16 – 15	Wasps

Recreation Ground

9 March 1991

Bristol	10 – 6	Leicester

Memorial Stadium

9 March 1991

Liverpool St Helens	12 – 13	Nottingham

Moss Lane

9 March 1991

Northampton	12 – 9	Gloucester

Franklin's Gardens

9 March 1991

Orrell	16 – 0	Moseley

Edge Hall Road

9 March 1991

Saracens	13 – 11	Rosslyn Park

Bramley Road

Bye/s: Harlequins

=== Round 11 ===
23 March 1991

Gloucester	9 – 16	Orrell

Kingsholm
Referee: Roger Quittenton

23 March 1991

Leicester	12 – 15	Harlequins

Welford Road

23 March 1991

Moseley	9 – 9	Bristol

The Reddings

23 March 1991

Nottingham	3 – 10	Bath

Ireland Avenue

23 March 1991

Rosslyn Park	39 – 9	Liverpool St Helens

The Rock

23 March 1991

Moseley	9 – 9	Bristol

The Reddings

Bye/s: Saracens

=== Round 12 ===
13 April 1991

Bath	45 – 21	Rosslyn Park

Recreation Ground
Referee: S V Griffiths

13 April 1991

Bristol	15 – 12	Gloucester

Memorial Stadium
Referee: Colin High

13 April 1991

Harlequins	33 – 6	Moseley

The Stoop

13 April 1991

Liverpool St Helens	3 – 17	Saracens

Moss Lane

13 April 1991

Northampton	10 – 16	Nottingham

Franklin's Gardens

13 April 1991

Orrell	12 – 14	Wasps

Edge Hall Road

Bye/s: Leicester

=== Round 13 ===
27 April 1991

Gloucester	38 – 19	Harlequins

Kingsholm
Referee: S V Griffiths

27 April 1991

Moseley	19 – 43	Leicester

The Reddings

27 April 1991

Nottingham	16 – 12	Orrell

Ireland Avenue

27 April 1991

Rosslyn Park	48 – 0	Northampton

The Rock

27 April 1991

Saracens	6 – 49	Bath

Bramley Road
Referee: D J Leslie

- Bath are champions.

27 April 1991

Wasps	46 – 19	Bristol

Repton Avenue

Bye/s: Liverpool St Helens

== See also ==
- 1990–91 National Division 2
- 1990–91 National Division 3
- 1990–91 National Division 4 North
- 1990–91 National Division 4 South
