= Arthur Gray (rugby) =

English rugby union and rugby league player

Personal information
- Full name: Arthur Gray
- Born: 4 September 1917 Leeds, England
- Died: 25 August 1991 (aged 73) Scarborough, England

Playing information

Rugby union
- Position: Full-back
Club
Years	Team	Pld	T	G	FG	P
≤Jan 1947–≥Mar 47	Otley
Representative
Years	Team	Pld	T	G	FG	P
1947–47	England	3	0	1	0	2

Rugby league
- Position: Fullback
Club
Years	Team	Pld	T	G	FG	P
1947–50	Wakefield Trinity	15	1	0	0	3

Arthur Gray (4 September 1917 – 25 August 1991) was an English rugby union, and professional rugby league footballer who played in the 1940s. He played representative level rugby union (RU) for England, and at club level for Otley, as a full-back, and club level rugby league (RL) for Wakefield Trinity, as a fullback.

== Background ==
Arthur Gray was born in Leeds, West Riding of Yorkshire, England, and he died aged 73 in Scarborough, North Yorkshire, England.

== Playing career ==
=== International honours ===
Arthur Gray made his international rugby union début, and scored a conversion, in England's 9–6 victory over Wales at Cardiff Arms Park on Saturday 18 January 1947. see List of England national rugby union team - Results 1947. He played two further rugby union internationals, in the 1947 Five Nations Championship against Ireland, and Scotland.

=== Club career ===
Arthur Gray made his début for Wakefield Trinity during April 1947, and he played his last match for Wakefield Trinity during the 1949–50 season
