= 1990–91 National Division 2 =

Rugby union competition in England

- Countries: England
- Date: 22 September 1990 – 27 April 1991
- Champions: Rugby (1st title)
- Runners-up: London Irish
- Relegated: Richmond; Headingley
- Matches played: 78
- Top point scorer: 117 – Brendan Mullin (London Irish)
- Top try scorer: 9 – Lindsay Renwick (London Scottish)

The 1990–91 National Division 2 (sponsored by Courage Brewery) was the fourth season of the second tier of the English rugby union league system, the Courage Clubs Championship, currently known as Champ Rugby. New sides to the division included Bedford who were relegated from the top flight after a gap of just one season, while London Scottish and Wakefield were promoted from tier 3. In 1990 the Gosforth club split into two clubs, one became Newcastle Gosforth and moved to Kingston Park, known then as the New Ground while Gosforth Rugby Club continued as an amateur side working in partnership with Northumbria University.

Rugby, the champions, were promoted to the 1991–92 National Division 1 along with the league runner–up, London Irish. Headingley finished last and were relegated to the 1991–92 National Division 3 as were Richmond who finished one place above them. It was a competitive season with both the promotion and relegation spots going all the way to the last game.

== Structure ==
The division increased from twelve teams to thirteen, each side playing the others once to make a total of twelve matches each. The top two sides would be promoted to National Division 1 while the bottom two would drop to National Division 3.

== Participating teams ==
Locations of the 1990–91 National Division 2 teams
1990–91 Greater London National Division 2 teams

| Team | Stadium | Capacity | City/Area | Previous season |
|---|---|---|---|---|
| Bedford | Goldington Road | 4,800 (800 seats) | Bedford, Bedfordshire | Relegated from National 1 (12th) |
| Blackheath | Rectory Field | 3,500 (500 seats) | Greenwich, London | 10th |
| Coventry | Coundon Road | 10,000 (1,100 seats) | Coventry, West Midlands | 4th |
| Newcastle Gosforth (Note: Formerly known as Gosforth, the club changed their name to Newcastle Gosforth ahead of the 1990–91 season.) | Kingston Park (Note: Previously based at North Road, Gosforth had spent the 1989–90 season ground sharing at the Prenton Avenue, the home ground of Percy Park RFC, before moving into Kingston Park for the 1990–91 season.) | 6,600 | Newcastle upon Tyne, Tyne and Wear | 12th (no relegation) |
| Headingley | Clarence Fields | 7,850 (850 seats) | Leeds, West Yorkshire | 8th |
| London Irish | The Avenue | 3,600 (600 seats) | Sunbury-on-Thames, Surrey | 5th |
| London Scottish | Athletic Ground | 7,300 (1,300 seats) | Richmond, London | Promoted from National 3 (1st) |
| Plymouth Albion | Beacon Park | 1,950 (450 seats) | Plymouth, Devon | 7th |
| Richmond | Athletic Ground | 7,300 (1,300 seats) | Richmond, London | 3rd |
| Rugby | Webb Ellis Road | 3,200 (200 seats) | Rugby, Warwickshire | 6th |
| Sale | Heywood Road | 4,000 (500 seats) | Sale, Greater Manchester | 9th |
| Wakefield | College Grove | 4,000 (500 seats) | Wakefield, West Yorkshire | Promoted from National 3 (2nd) |
| Waterloo | St Anthony's Road | 9,950 (950 seats) | Blundellsands, Merseyside | 11th (no relegation) |

== Table ==
1990–91 National Division 2 table
| Pos | Team | Pld | W | D | L | PF | PA | PD | Pts | Qualification |
|---|---|---|---|---|---|---|---|---|---|---|
| 1 | Rugby (C) | 12 | 10 | 0 | 2 | 252 | 146 | +106 | 20 | Promotion place |
| 2 | London Irish | 12 | 9 | 1 | 2 | 239 | 192 | +47 | 19 | Promotion place |
| 3 | Wakefield | 12 | 8 | 0 | 4 | 188 | 109 | +79 | 16 | |
| 4 | Coventry | 12 | 8 | 0 | 4 | 172 | 129 | +43 | 16 | |
| 5 | London Scottish | 12 | 7 | 0 | 5 | 240 | 178 | +62 | 14 | |
| 6 | Newcastle Gosforth | 12 | 6 | 0 | 6 | 169 | 140 | +29 | 12 | |
| 7 | Sale | 12 | 5 | 1 | 6 | 224 | 156 | +68 | 11 | |
| 8 | Bedford | 12 | 4 | 2 | 6 | 138 | 203 | −65 | 10 | |
| 9 | Waterloo | 12 | 4 | 1 | 7 | 154 | 206 | −52 | 9 | |
| 10 | Blackheath | 12 | 4 | 0 | 8 | 134 | 169 | −35 | 8 | |
| 11 | Plymouth Albion | 12 | 4 | 0 | 8 | 129 | 210 | −81 | 8 | |
| 12 | Richmond | 12 | 3 | 1 | 8 | 134 | 245 | −111 | 7 | Relegation place |
| 13 | Headingley | 12 | 3 | 0 | 9 | 125 | 215 | −90 | 6 | Relegation place |

Rules for classification: Points are awarded as follows:
1. two points for a win
2. one point for a draw
3. no points for a loss

If teams are level at any stage, tiebreakers are applied in the following order:

1. difference between points for and against
2. total number of points for
  (C) Champions

== Fixtures & Results ==
=== Round 1 ===
22 September 1990

| Blackheath | 13 – 19 | London Scottish |

Rectory Field

22 September 1990

| Coventry | 26 – 15 | Waterloo |

Coundon Road

22 September 1990

| Headingley | 11 – 20 | Rugby |

Clarence Fields

22 September 1990

| London Irish | 19 – 18 | Plymouth Albion |

The Avenue

22 September 1990

| Newcastle Gosforth | 7 – 6 | Sale |

Kingston Park

22 September 1990

| Wakefield | 27 – 0 | Bedford |

College Grove

Bye/s: Richmond

=== Round 2 ===
6 October 1990

| Bedford | 18 – 19 | London Irish |

Goldington Road

6 October 1990

| London Scottish | 9 – 12 | Coventry |

Athletic Ground

6 October 1990

| Plymouth Albion | 19 – 13 | Richmond |

Beacon Park

6 October 1990

| Rugby | 14 – 6 | Wakefield |

Webb Ellis Road

6 October 1990

| Sale | 42 – 0 | Headingley |

Heywood Road

6 October 1990

| Waterloo | 12 – 10 | Newcastle Gosforth |

St Anthony's Road

Bye/s: Blackheath

=== Round 3 ===
13 October 1990

| Coventry | 16 – 4 | Blackheath |

Coundon Road

13 October 1990

| Headingley | 16 – 13 | Waterloo |

Clarence Fields

13 October 1990

| London Irish | 29 – 17 | Rugby |

The Avenue

13 October 1990

| Newcastle Gosforth | 12 – 13 | London Scottish |

Kingston Park

13 October 1990

| Richmond | 28 – 17 | Bedford |

Athletic Ground

13 October 1990

| Wakefield | 13 – 10 | Sale |

College Grove

Bye/s: Plymouth Albion

=== Round 4 ===
20 October 1990

| Bedford | 10 – 9 | Plymouth Albion |

Beacon Park

20 October 1990

| Blackheath | 9 – 19 | Newcastle Gosforth |

Rectory Field

20 October 1990

| London Scottish | 30 – 7 | Headingley |

Athletic Ground

20 October 1990

| Rugby | 28 – 9 | Richmond |

Webb Ellis Road

20 October 1990

| Sale | 36 – 24 | London Irish |

Heywood Road

20 October 1990

| Waterloo | 6 – 14 | Wakefield |

St Anthony's Road

Bye/s: Coventry

=== Round 5 ===
27 October 1990

| Headingley | 16 – 15 | Blackheath |

Clarence Fields

27 October 1990

| London Irish | 39 – 0 | Waterloo |

The Avenue

27 October 1990

| Newcastle Gosforth | 10 – 9 | Coventry |

Kingston Park

27 October 1990

| Plymouth Albion | 6 – 28 | Rugby |

Beacon Park

27 October 1990

| Richmond | 10 – 9 | Sale |

Athletic Ground

27 October 1990

| Wakefield | 21 – 9 | London Scottish |

College Grove

Bye/s: Bedford

=== Round 6 ===
10 November 1990

| Blackheath | 12 – 7 | Wakefield |

Rectory Field

10 November 1990

| Coventry | 11 – 3 | Headingley |

Coundon Road

10 November 1990

| London Scottish | 13 – 17 | London Irish |

Athletic Ground

10 November 1990

| Rugby | 28 – 3 | Bedford |

Webb Ellis Road

10 November 1990

| Sale | 20 – 9 | Plymouth Albion |

Heywood Road

10 November 1990

| Waterloo | 25 – 9 | Richmond |

St Anthony's Road

Bye/s: Newcastle Gosforth

=== Round 7 ===
17 November 1990

| Bedford | 10 – 10 | Sale |

Goldington Road

17 November 1990

| Headingley | 7 – 18 | Newcastle Gosforth |

Clarence Fields

17 November 1990

| London Irish | 21 – 18 | Blackheath |

The Avenue

17 November 1990

| Plymouth Albion | 13 – 21 | Waterloo |

Beacon Park

17 November 1990

| Richmond | 15 – 40 | London Scottish |

Athletic Ground

17 November 1990

| Wakefield | 32 – 10 | Coventry |

College Grove

Bye/s: Rugby

=== Round 8 ===
12 January 1991

| Blackheath | 12 – 9 | Richmond |

Rectory Field

12 January 1991

| Coventry | 20 – 4 | London Irish |

Coundon Road

12 January 1991

| London Scottish | 32 – 0 | Plymouth Albion |

Athletic Ground

12 January 1991

| Newcastle Gosforth | 6 – 13 | Wakefield |

Kingston Park

12 January 1991

| Sale | 18 – 26 | Rugby |

Heywood Road

12 January 1991

| Waterloo | 13 – 13 | Bedford |

St Anthony's Road

Bye/s: Headingley

=== Round 9 ===
23 February 1991

| Bedford | P – P | London Scottish |

Goldington Road

- Postponed. Game rescheduled to 20 March 1991.

23 February 1991

| London Irish | P – P | Newcastle Gosforth |

The Avenue

- Postponed. Game rescheduled to 20 March 1991.

23 February 1991

| Plymouth Albion | P – P | Blackheath |

Beacon Park

- Postponed. Game rescheduled to 2 March 1991.

23 February 1991

| Richmond | P – P | Coventry |

Athletic Ground

- Postponed. Game rescheduled to 20 March 1991.

23 February 1991

| Rugby | 16 – 13 | Waterloo |

Webb Ellis Road

23 February 1991

| Wakefield | 17 – 9 | Headingley |

College Grove

Bye/s: Sale

=== Round 9 (rescheduled game) ===
2 March 1991

| Plymouth Albion | 13 – 3 | Blackheath |

Beacon Park

- Game rescheduled from 23 February 1991.

=== Round 10 ===
9 March 1991

| Blackheath | 12 – 16 | Bedford |

Rectory Field

9 March 1991

| Coventry | 21 – 9 | Plymouth Albion |

Coundon Road

9 March 1991

| Headingley | 9 – 10 | London Irish |

Clarence Fields

9 March 1991

| London Scottish | 27 – 19 | Rugby |

Athletic Ground

9 March 1991

| Newcastle Gosforth | 22 – 7 | Richmond |

Kingston Park

9 March 1991

| Waterloo | 17 – 13 | Sale |

St Anthony's Road

Bye/s: Wakefield

=== Round 9 (rescheduled game) ===
20 March 1991

| London Irish | 24 – 16 | Newcastle Gosforth |

The Avenue

- Game rescheduled from 23 February 1991.

=== Round 11 ===
23 March 1991

| Bedford | 7 – 9 | Coventry |

Goldington Road

23 March 1991

| London Irish | 15 – 9 | Wakefield |

The Avenue

23 March 1991

| Plymouth Albion | 12 – 3 | Newcastle Gosforth |

Beacon Park

23 March 1991

| Richmond | 17 – 6 | Headingley |

Athletic Ground

23 March 1991

| Rugby | 18 – 7 | Blackheath |

Webb Ellis Road

23 March 1991

| Sale | 25 – 10 | London Scottish |

Heywood Road

Bye/s: Waterloo

=== Round 9 (rescheduled games) ===
20 March 1991

| Bedford | 21 – 16 | London Scottish |

Goldington Road

- Game rescheduled from 23 February 1991.

20 March 1991

| Richmond | 0 – 13 | Coventry |

Athletic Ground

- Game rescheduled from 23 February 1991.

=== Round 12 ===
13 April 1991

| Blackheath | 14 – 12 | Sale |

Rectory Field

13 April 1991

| Coventry | 9 – 13 | Rugby |

Coundon Road

13 April 1991

| Headingley | 31 – 6 | Plymouth Albion |

Clarence Fields

13 April 1991

| London Scottish | 22 – 16 | Waterloo |

Athletic Ground

13 April 1991

| Newcastle Gosforth | 22 – 7 | Bedford |

Kingston Park

13 April 1991

| Wakefield | 20 – 3 | Richmond |

College Grove

Bye/s: London Irish

=== Round 13 ===
27 April 1991

| Bedford | 16 – 10 | Headingley |

Goldington Road

- Headingley are relegated.

27 April 1991

| Plymouth Albion | 15 – 9 | Wakefield |

College Grove

27 April 1991

| Richmond | 18 – 18 | London Irish |

Athletic Ground

- Richmond are relegated while London Irish are promoted as league runners up.

27 April 1991

| Rugby | 25 – 8 | Newcastle Gosforth |

Webb Ellis Road

- Rugby are promoted as league champions.

27 April 1991

| Sale | 23 – 16 | Coventry |

Heywood Road

27 April 1991

| Waterloo | 3 – 15 | Blackheath |

St Anthony's Road

Bye/s: London Scottish

== See also ==
- 1990–91 National Division 1
- 1990–91 National Division 3
- 1990–91 National Division 4 North
- 1990–91 National Division 4 South
