= 1991–92 National Division 4 South =

Rugby union competition in England

- Countries: England
- Champions: Havant (1st title)
- Runners-up: Basingstoke
- Relegated: Ealing, Sidcup
- Matches played: 156

The 1991–92 National Division 4 South was the fifth full season of rugby union within the fourth tier of the English league system, currently known as National League 2 South. At the end of the campaign, Havant finished as champions, just edging Hampshire rivals Basingstoke by virtue of a better for/against record to gain promotion to the 1992–93 National Division 3.

At the other end of the table Ealing and Sidcup finished in the relegation zone. Of the two Sidcup put up the better fight but ended up being relegated in 12th place despite being tied with two other clubs on 6 points each due to a poorer for/against record. Both clubs would be relegated to London 1 for the following season.

== Structure ==
Each team played one match against each of the other teams, playing a total of twelve matches each. The champions are promoted to National Division 3 and the bottom two teams are relegated to either London Division 1 or South West 1 depending on their locality.

== Participating teams and locations ==
Locations of the 1991–92 National Division 4 South teams

Team	Ground	Capacity	City/Area	Previous season
Basingstoke	Down Grange	2,500	Basingstoke, Hampshire	2nd
Camborne	Recreation Ground	11,000	Camborne, Cornwall	4th
Ealing	Horsenden Hill		Horsenden Hill, Ealing, London	10th
Havant	Hook's Lane	3,000 (200 seats)	Havant, Hampshire	8th
High Wycombe	Kingsmead Road		High Wycombe, Buckinghamshire	Promoted from South West 1 (champions)
London Welsh	Old Deer Park	4,500 (1,500 seats)	Richmond, London	3rd
Maidstone	William Davey Memorial	2,000 (100 seats)	Maidstone, Kent	11th
Metropolitan Police	Imber Court	3,500 (500 seats)	East Molesey, Surrey	Relegated from National 3 (12th)
North Walsham	Norwich Road	1,200	Scottow, Norfolk	6th
Sidcup	Crescent Farm		Sidcup, Kent	
Southend	Warners Park	1,500 (150 seats)	Southend, Essex	9th
Sudbury	Moorsfield	1,000	Sudbury, Suffolk	7th
Weston-super-Mare	Recreation Ground	3,000	Weston-super-Mare, Somerset	5th

== League table ==
1991–92 National Division 4 South table
Pos	Team	Pld	W	D	L	PF	PA	PD	Pts	Qualification
1	Havant (C)	12	11	0	1	301	91	+210	22	Promoted
2	Basingstoke	12	11	0	1	218	88	+130	22	
3	London Welsh	12	9	0	3	292	160	+132	18	
4	Sudbury	12	8	0	4	235	150	+85	16	
5	High Wycombe	12	8	0	4	196	139	+57	16	
6	Camborne	12	7	0	5	166	195	−29	14	
7	North Walsham	12	5	0	7	153	152	+1	10	
8	Maidstone	12	5	0	7	147	180	−33	10	
9	Weston-super-Mare	12	4	0	8	175	215	−40	8	
10	Metropolitan Police	12	3	0	9	149	195	−46	6	
11	Southend	12	3	0	9	134	240	−106	6	
12	Sidcup (R)	12	3	0	9	103	290	−187	6	Relegated
13	Ealing (R)	12	1	0	11	112	286	−174	2	Relegated

Rules for classification: Points are awarded as follows: 2 pts for a win, 1 pt for a draw, 0 pts for a loss. If teams are level at any stage, difference between points for and against applies.
(C) Champions; (R) Relegated

== Sponsorship ==
National League 4 South is part of the Courage Clubs Championship and is sponsored by Courage Brewery.

== See also ==
- 1991–92 National Division 1
- 1991–92 National Division 2
- 1991–92 National Division 3
- 1991–92 National Division 4 North
