= Craig Emmerson =

English rugby union footballer and coach

- Born: Craig Emmerson; 14 September 1971 (age 55) Halifax, West Yorkshire
- Height: 5 ft 11 in (1.80 m)
- Weight: 13 st 0 lb (83 kg)
- Occupation: Electrician

Rugby union career
- Position: Centre
- Current team: Halifax RUFC
Amateur team(s)
Years	Team	Apps	(Points)
- Halifax
–	West Harlepool		
–	Morley		
–	Gloucester		
–	Leeds Tykes		
–	Wakefield		
–	Halifax		
–	Morley		
–	Harlequins		

Craig Emmerson (born 14 September 1971) is an English-born rugby union player. He was the first player to ever have a transfer fee paid for them when he moved from Morley to Gloucester in 1995 just as professionalism had been passed by the International Board.

== Biography ==
Emmerson was born in Halifax, West Yorkshire, England on 14 September 1971. He began his rugby union career at the age of 16 for Halifax RUFC. He also has played for West Hartlepool, Harlequins, Morley, Gloucester, Leeds Tykes and Wakefield.

He is an electrician by trade.

== Honours ==
England Colts
North of England U21
North of England
