= Staffordshire Intermediate Cup =

- Sport: Rugby Union
- Instituted: 2001; 25 years ago
- Number of teams: 8
- Country: England
- Holders: Newcastle (Staffs) (3rd title) (2017-18)
- Most titles: Willenhall (4 titles)
- Website: Staffordshire RU website

The Staffordshire Intermediate Cup is an annual rugby union knock-out club competition organized by the Staffordshire Rugby Union. It was first introduced during the 2001–02 season, with the inaugural winners being Burntwood. It is the second most important rugby union cup competition in Staffordshire, behind the Staffordshire Senior Cup but ahead of the Staffordshire Owen Cup.

The Intermediate Cup is open to club sides based in Staffordshire and parts of the West Midlands typically playing in tier 7 (Midlands 2 West (North)) and tier 8 (Midlands 3 West (North)) of the English rugby union system. The current format is a knock-out competition with a first round, semi finals and a final played at a neutral ground in April–May. At present Intermediate Cup finals are held on the same date and at the same venue as the Owen Cup finals.

== Staffordshire Intermediate Cup winners ==
Staffordshire Intermediate Cup Finals
Season	Winner	Score	Runners–up	Venue
2001-02	Burntwood			
2002-03	Wednesbury			
2003-04	Wednesbury			
2004-05	Wednesbury			
2005-06	Burntwood			
2006-07	Willenhall			
2007-08	Willenhall			
2008-09	Tamworth	15-3	Trentham	Trentham Fields, Longton, Stoke-on-Trent
2009-10	Burntwood		Wednesbury	The County Ground, Stafford
2010-11	Tamworth		Burntwood	Cooke Fields, Lichfield
2011-12	Handsworth	20-8	Eccleshall	Peel Croft, Burton upon Trent
2012-13	Willenhall	57-22	Handsworth	The Sportsway, Burntwood
2013-14	Newcastle (Staffs)	39-22	Handsworth	Hartwell Lane, Barlaston
2014-15	Willenhall	26-17	Newcastle (Staffs)	Castlecroft Road, Castlecroft, Wolverhampton
2015-16	Eccleshall	31-26	Newcastle (Staffs)	Lilleshall Road, Clayton, Newcastle-under-Lyme
2016-17	Newcastle (Staffs)	30-20	Handsworth	New Inn Lane, Trentham, Stoke-on-Trent
2017-18	Newcastle (Staffs)	46-27	Stafford	Esterchem Park, Cheddleton, Staffordshire

== Number of wins ==
- Willenhall (4)
- Burntwood (3)
- Newcastle (Staffs) (3)
- Wednesbury (3)
- Tamworth (2)
- Eccleshall (1)
- Handsworth (1)
- Will Peach (0)

== See also ==
- Staffordshire RU
- Staffordshire Senior Cup
- Staffordshire Owen Cup
- English rugby union system
- Rugby union in England
