= 1991–92 National Division 1 =

Rugby union competition in England

- Countries: England
- Date: 16 September 1991 – 25 April 1992
- Champions: Bath (3rd title)
- Runners-up: Orrell
- Relegated: Nottingham; Rosslyn Park
- Matches played: 78
- Top point scorer: 129 – John Liley (Leicester)
- Top try scorer: 9 – Rory Underwood (Leicester)

The 1991–92 National Division 1 (sponsored by Courage Brewery) was the fifth season of the top tier of the English rugby union league system, the Courage Clubs Championship, currently known as Premiership Rugby. Bath were the defending champions while new teams included promoted sides Rugby Lions and London Irish.

Bath were the champions, retaining their title (and third overall), beating Orrell by one point, while Nottingham and Rosslyn Park were relegated to the 1992–93 National Division 2.

== Structure ==
Each team played one match against each of the other teams, playing a total of twelve matches each. The bottom two sides would be relegated to National Division 2.

== Participating teams ==
Locations of the 1991–92 Courage League National Division One teams
1991–92 Greater London Courage League National Division One teams

Team	Stadium	Capacity	City/Area	Previous season
Bath	Recreation Ground	8,300 (1,000 seats)	Bath, Somerset	Champions
Bristol	Memorial Stadium	8,500 (1,200 seats)	Bristol, Avon	11th
Gloucester	Kingsholm	11,100 (1,100 seats)	Gloucester, Gloucestershire	6th
Harlequins	The Stoop	9,000 (2,000 seats)	Twickenham, London	3rd
Leicester	Welford Road	14,700 (9,200 seats)	Leicester, Leicestershire	4th
London Irish	The Avenue	3,600 (600 seats)	Sunbury-on-Thames, Surrey	Promoted from National 2 (2nd)
Northampton	Franklin's Gardens	6,000 (2,000 seats)	Northampton, Northamptonshire	9th
Nottingham	Ireland Avenue	4,990 (590 seats)	Beeston, Nottinghamshire	8th
Orrell	Edge Hall Road	5,300 (300 seats)	Orrell, Greater Manchester	5th
Rosslyn Park	The Rock	4,630 (630 seats)	Roehampton, London	7th
Rugby	Webb Ellis Road	3,200 (200 seats)	Rugby, Warwickshire	Promoted from National 2 (1st)
Saracens	Bramley Road	2,300 (300 seats)	Enfield, London	10th
Wasps	Repton Avenue	3,200 (1,200 seats)	Sudbury, London	2nd

== Table ==
Pos	Team	Pld	W	D	L	PF	PA	PD	Pts
1	Bath (C)	12	10	1	1	277	126	+151	21
2	Orrell	12	10	0	2	204	95	+109	20
3	Northampton	12	9	1	2	209	136	+73	19
4	Gloucester	12	7	1	4	193	168	+25	15
5	Saracens	12	7	1	4	176	165	+11	15
6	Leicester	12	6	1	5	262	216	+46	13
7	Wasps	12	6	0	6	177	180	−3	12
8	Harlequins	12	5	1	6	213	207	+6	11
9	London Irish	12	3	3	6	147	237	−90	9
10	Bristol	12	4	0	8	192	174	+18	8
11	Rugby	12	2	3	7	124	252	−128	7
12	Nottingham (R)	12	2	1	9	133	204	−71	5
13	Rosslyn Park (R)	12	0	1	11	111	258	−147	1

(C) Champions; (R) Relegated

== Results ==
The Home Team is listed on the left column.

Home \ Away	BAT	BRI	GLO	HAR	LEI	LOI	NOR	NOT	ORR	ROS	RLI	SAR	WAS
Bath Rugby		9–4	29–9		37–6		15–6	25–15				32–12	
Bristol				16–0		14–19	9–15			22–4	48–4		10–33
Gloucester RFC		29–15			21–3	22–15	10–17			12–9			15–10
Harlequins	18–18		21–18		20–13			23–6	7–10			21–37	
Leicester		25–9				36–13	19–22			51–16	22–22		31–12
London Irish	21–26			3–39					7–21	12–12	6–6		18–13
Northampton				25–14		12–12			12–3	20–12	29–0		28–15
Nottingham		0–32	3–14		14–27	9–12	18–9			34–9			
Orrell	10–9	23–9	18–12		21–9			20–6				23–0	
Rosslyn Park	13–21			12–24					4–22		7–15	6–10	7–15
Rugby Lions	0–32		16–19	29–20				9–9	7–21			6–22	
Saracens		13–4	12–12		9–20	27–9	9–14	13–12					
Wasps	12–24			20–6				11–7	13–12		17–10	6–12	

Legend: Blue = home team win; Yellow = draw; Red = away team win.

== Fixtures & results ==
=== Round 1 ===
16 November 1991

Gloucester	21 – 3	Leicester

Kingsholm
Referee: Clayton Thomas

16 November 1991

London Irish	21 – 26	Bath

The Avenue

- Bath deducted 1 point for fielding an ineligible player.

16 November 1991

Nottingham	0 – 32	Bristol

Ireland Avenue

16 November 1991

Rosslyn Park	4 – 22	Orrell

The Rock

16 November 1991

Saracens	9 – 14	Northampton

Bramley Road

16 November 1991

Wasps	20 – 6	Harlequins

Repton Avenue

Bye/s: Rugby

=== Round 2 ===
23 November 1991

Bristol	22 – 4	Rosslyn Park

Memorial Stadium

23 November 1991

Harlequins	23 – 6	Nottingham

The Stoop

23 November 1991

Leicester	31 – 12	Wasps

Welford Road

23 November 1991

Northampton	12 – 12	London Irish

Franklin's Gardens

23 November 1991

Orrell	23 – 0	Saracens

Edge Hall Road

23 November 1991

Rugby	16 – 19	Gloucester

Webb Ellis Road
Referee: Ronnie McDowell

Bye/s: Bath

=== Round 3 ===
7 December 1991

Bath	15 – 6	Northampton

Recreation Ground

7 December 1991

London Irish	7 – 21	Orrell

The Avenue

7 December 1991

Nottingham	14 – 27	Leicester

Ireland Avenue

7 December 1991

Rosslyn Park	12 – 24	Harlequins

The Rock

7 December 1991

Saracens	13 – 4	Bristol

Bramley Road

7 December 1991

Wasps	17 – 10	Rugby

Repton Avenue

Bye/s: Gloucester

=== Round 4 ===
14 December 1991

Bristol	P – P	London Irish

Memorial Stadium

- Postponed due to cold weather. Game to be rescheduled for 18 April 1992.

14 December 1991

Gloucester	P – P	Wasps

Repton Avenue

- Postponed due to cold weather. Game to be rescheduled for 18 April 1992.

14 December 1991

Harlequins	P – P	Saracens

The Stoop

- Postponed due to cold weather. Game to be rescheduled for 21 March 1992.

14 December 1991

Leicester	P – P	Rosslyn Park

Welford Road

- Postponed due to cold weather. Game to be rescheduled for 21 March 1992.

14 December 1991

Orrell	10 – 9	Bath

Edge Hall Road
Referee: C J Harrison

14 December 1991

Rugby	P – P	Nottingham

Webb Ellis Road

- Postponed due to cold weather. Game to be rescheduled for 22 February 1992.

Bye/s: Northampton

=== Round 5 ===
21 December 1991

Bath	9 – 4	Bristol

Recreation Ground
Attendance: 6,000
Referee: J J M Pearson

21 December 1991

London Irish	3 – 39	Harlequins

The Avenue

21 December 1991

Northampton	12 – 3	Orrell

Franklin's Gardens

21 December 1991

Nottingham	3 – 14	Gloucester

Ireland Avenue
Referee: David Sainsbury

21 December 1991

Rosslyn Park	7 – 15	Rugby

The Rock

21 December 1991

Saracens	9 – 20	Leicester

Bramley Road

Bye/s: Wasps

=== Round 6 ===
4 January 1992

Bristol	9 – 15	Northampton

Memorial Stadium

4 January 1992

Gloucester	12 – 9	Rosslyn Park

Kingsholm
Referee: A Savage

4 January 1992

Harlequins	18 – 18	Bath

The Stoop
Attendance: 7,000
Referee: D J Leslie

4 January 1992

Leicester	36 – 13	London Irish

Welford Road

4 January 1992

Rugby	6 – 22	Saracens

Webb Ellis Road

4 January 1992

Wasps	11 – 7	Nottingham

Repton Avenue

Bye/s: Orrell

=== Round 7 ===
11 January 1992

Bath	37 – 6	Leicester

Recreation Ground
Referee: F Howard

11 January 1992

London Irish	6 – 6	Rugby

The Avenue

11 January 1992

Northampton	25 – 14	Harlequins

Franklin's Gardens
Attendance: 6,000
Referee: E Morrison

11 January 1992

Orrell	23 – 9	Bristol

Edge Hall Road
Referee: S V Griffiths

11 January 1992

Rosslyn Park	7 – 15	Wasps

The Rock
Referee: S Piercy

11 January 1992

Saracens	12 – 12	Gloucester

Bramley Road
Referee: C J Harrison

Bye/s: Nottingham

=== Round 8 ===
8 February 1992

Gloucester	P – P	London Irish

Kingsholm

- Postponed. Game rescheduled to 25 March 1992.

8 February 1992

Harlequins	P – P	Orrell

The Stoop

- Postponed. Game rescheduled to 22 April 1992.

8 February 1992

Leicester	P – P	Northampton

Welford Road

- Postponed. Game rescheduled to 7 April 1992.

8 February 1992

Nottingham	P – P	Rosslyn Park

Ireland Avenue

- Postponed. Game rescheduled to 4 April 1992.

8 February 1992

Rugby	P – P	Bath

Webb Ellis Road

- Postponed. Game rescheduled to 21 March 1992.

8 February 1992

Wasps	P – P	Saracens

Repton Avenue

- Postponed. Game rescheduled to 22 February 1992.

Bye/s: Bristol

=== Round 4 & 9 (rescheduled games) ===
22 February 1992

Rugby	9 – 9	Nottingham

Webb Ellis Road

- Game rescheduled from 14 December 1991.

22 February 1992

Wasps	6 – 12	Saracens

Repton Avenue

- Game rescheduled from 8 February 1992.

=== Round 9 ===
29 February 1992

Bath	29 – 9	Gloucester

Recreation Ground
Referee: S V Griffiths

29 February 1992

Bristol	16 – 0	Harlequins

Memorial Stadium

29 February 1992

London Irish	18 – 13	Wasps

The Avenue

29 February 1992

Northampton	29 – 0	Rugby

Franklin's Gardens

29 February 1992

Orrell	21 – 9	Leicester

Edge Hall Road

29 February 1992

Saracens	13 – 12	Nottingham

Bramley Road

Bye/s: Rosslyn Park

=== Round 10 ===
14 March 1992

Gloucester	10 – 17	Northampton

Kingsholm
Referee: John Pearson

14 March 1992

Leicester	25 – 9	Bristol

Welford Road

14 March 1992

Nottingham	9 – 12	London Irish

Ireland Avenue

14 March 1992

Rosslyn Park	6 – 10	Saracens

The Rock

14 March 1992

Rugby	7 – 21	Orrell

Webb Ellis Road

14 March 1992

Wasps	12 – 24	Bath

Repton Avenue

Bye/s: Harlequins

=== Rounds 4 & 8 (rescheduled games) ===
21 March 1992

Harlequins	21 – 37	Saracens

The Stoop

- Game rescheduled from 14 December 1991.

21 March 1992

Leicester	51 – 16	Rosslyn Park

Welford Road

- Game rescheduled from 14 December 1991.

21 March 1992

Rugby	0 – 32	Bath

Webb Ellis Road
Referee: C J High

- Game rescheduled from 8 February 1992.

25 March 1992

Gloucester	22 – 15	London Irish

Kingsholm
Referee: Fred Howard

- Game rescheduled from 8 February 1992.

=== Round 11 ===
28 March 1992

Bath	25 – 15	Nottingham

Recreation Ground

28 March 1992

Bristol	48 – 4	Rugby

Memorial Stadium

28 March 1992

Harlequins	20 – 13	Leicester

The Stoop

28 March 1992

London Irish	12 – 12	Rosslyn Park

The Avenue

28 March 1992

Northampton	28 – 15	Wasps

Franklin's Gardens

28 March 1992

Orrell	18 – 12	Gloucester

Edge Hall Road
Referee: Stewart Piercy

Bye/s: Saracens

=== Round 8 (rescheduled games) ===
4 April 1992

Nottingham	34 – 9	Rosslyn Park

Ireland Avenue

- Game rescheduled from 8 February 1992.

7 April 1992

Leicester	19 – 22	Northampton

Welford Road

- Game rescheduled from 8 February 1992.

=== Round 12 ===
11 April 1992

Gloucester	29 – 15	Bristol

Kingsholm
Referee: David Matthews

11 April 1992

Nottingham	18 – 9	Northampton

Ireland Avenue

11 April 1992

Rosslyn Park	13 – 21	Bath

The Rock
Referee: D J Hudson

11 April 1992

Rugby	29 – 20	Harlequins

Webb Ellis Road

11 April 1992

Saracens	27 – 9	London Irish

Bramley Road

11 April 1992

Wasps	13 – 12	Orrell

Edge Hall Road

Bye/s: Leicester

=== Round 4 (rescheduled games) ===
18 April 1992

Bristol	14 – 19	London Irish

Memorial Stadium

- Game rescheduled from 14 December 1991.

18 April 1992

Gloucester	15 – 10	Wasps

Kingsholm
Referee: Colin High

- Game rescheduled from 14 December 1991.

22 April 1992

Harlequins	7 – 10	Orrell

The Stoop

- Rescheduled from 8 February 1992.

=== Round 13 ===
25 April 1992

Bath	32 – 12	Saracens

Recreation Ground
Referee: G Seddon

- Bath are champions.

25 April 1992

Bristol	10 – 33	Wasps

Memorial Stadium

25 April 1992

Harlequins	21 – 18	Gloucester

The Stoop
Referee: S V Griffiths

25 April 1992

Leicester	22 – 22	Rugby

Welford Road

25 April 1992

Northampton	20 – 12	Rosslyn Park

Franklin's Gardens

25 April 1992

Orrell	20 – 6	Nottingham

Edge Hall Road

Bye/s: London Irish

== See also ==
- 1991–92 National Division 2
- 1991–92 National Division 3
- 1991–92 National Division 4 North
- 1991–92 National Division 4 South
