= 1991–92 National Division 2 =

Rugby union competition in England

- Countries: England
- Date: 16 November 1991 – 27 April 1992
- Champions: London Scottish (1st title)
- Runners-up: West Hartlepool
- Relegated: Plymouth Albion; Liverpool St Helens
- Matches played: 78
- Top point scorer: 147 – David Johnson (Newcastle Gosforth)
- Top try scorer: 11 – Nick Grecian (London Scottish)

The 1991–92 National Division 2 (sponsored by Courage Brewery) was the fifth season of the second tier of the English rugby union league system, the Courage Clubs Championship, currently known as Champ Rugby. New teams to the division included Moseley and Liverpool St Helens who were demoted from tier 1, while West Hartlepool and Morley were promoted from tier 3.

London Scottish, the champions, were promoted to the 1992–93 National Division 1 along with the runner-up West Hartlepool. In last place, Liverpool St Helens became the first team to lose all their league matches in one season, and along with Plymouth Albion who finished one place above them, were relegated to the 1992–93 National Division 3 for the following season. Liverpool St Helens have been promoted or relegated in each of the five seasons of league rugby, and are relegated for the second season in succession.

== Structure ==
Each side in the division played the others once to make a total of twelve matches each. The top two sides would be promoted to National Division 1 while the bottom two would drop to National Division 3.

== Participating teams ==
Locations of the 1991–92 National Division 2 teams

| Team | Stadium | Capacity | City/Area | Previous season |
|---|---|---|---|---|
| Bedford | Goldington Road | 4,800 (800 seats) | Bedford, Bedfordshire | 8th |
| Blackheath | Rectory Field | 3,500 (500 seats) | Greenwich, London | 10th |
| Coventry | Coundon Road | 10,000 (1,100 seats) | Coventry, West Midlands | 4th |
| Liverpool St Helens | Moss Lane | 4,370 (370 seats) | St Helens, Merseyside | Relegated from National 1 (13th) |
| London Scottish | Athletic Ground | 7,300 (1,300 seats) | Richmond, London | 5th |
| Morley | Scatcherd Lane | 6,000 (1,000 seats) | Morley, Leeds, West Yorkshire | Promoted from National 3 (2nd) |
| Moseley | The Reddings | 9,999 (1,800 seats) | Birmingham, West Midlands | Relegated from National 1 (12th) |
| Newcastle Gosforth | Kingston Park | 6,600 | Newcastle upon Tyne, Tyne and Wear | 6th |
| Plymouth Albion | Beacon Park | 1,950 (450 seats) | Plymouth, Devon | 11th |
| Sale | Heywood Road | 4,000 (500 seats) | Sale, Greater Manchester | 7th |
| Wakefield | College Grove | 4,000 (500 seats) | Wakefield, West Yorkshire | 3rd |
| Waterloo | St Anthony's Road | 9,950 (950 seats) | Blundellsands, Merseyside | 9th |
| West Hartlepool | Brierton Lane | 7,000 (Note: West Hartlepool's ground capacity at Brierton Lane re-estimated up from 4,950 to 7,000 for the 1991–92 season, with a capacity crowd achieved against Newcastle Gosforth on 14 March 1992.) | Hartlepool, County Durham | Promoted from National 3 (1st) |

== Table ==
1991–92 National Division 2 table
| Pos | Team | Pld | W | D | L | PF | PA | PD | Pts | Qualification |
|---|---|---|---|---|---|---|---|---|---|---|
| 1 | London Scottish (C) | 12 | 11 | 0 | 1 | 304 | 130 | +174 | 22 | Promotion place |
| 2 | West Hartlepool | 12 | 11 | 0 | 1 | 244 | 89 | +155 | 22 | Promotion place |
| 3 | Waterloo | 12 | 8 | 0 | 4 | 206 | 184 | +22 | 16 | |
| 4 | Newcastle Gosforth | 12 | 7 | 0 | 5 | 371 | 140 | +231 | 14 | |
| 5 | Wakefield | 12 | 7 | 0 | 5 | 187 | 194 | −7 | 14 | |
| 6 | Coventry | 12 | 7 | 0 | 5 | 187 | 196 | −9 | 14 | |
| 7 | Moseley | 12 | 6 | 0 | 6 | 215 | 196 | +19 | 12 | |
| 8 | Sale | 12 | 6 | 0 | 6 | 204 | 209 | −5 | 12 | |
| 9 | Morley | 12 | 4 | 0 | 8 | 171 | 202 | −31 | 8 | |
| 10 | Bedford | 12 | 4 | 0 | 8 | 168 | 204 | −36 | 8 | |
| 11 | Blackheath | 12 | 4 | 0 | 8 | 140 | 266 | −126 | 8 | |
| 12 | Plymouth Albion | 12 | 3 | 0 | 9 | 153 | 209 | −56 | 6 | Relegation place |
| 13 | Liverpool St Helens | 12 | 0 | 0 | 12 | 87 | 418 | −331 | 0 | Relegation place |

Source: rugbyarchive.net
Rules for classification: Points are awarded as follows:
1. two points for a win
2. one point for a draw
3. no points for a loss

If teams are level at any stage, tiebreakers are applied in the following order:

1. difference between points for and against
2. total number of points for
  (C) Champions

== Fixtures & Results ==
=== Round 1 ===
16 November 1991

| Bedford | 6 – 25 | Wakefield |

Goldington Road

16 November 1991

| London Scottish | 36 – 16 | Blackheath |

Athletic Ground

16 November 1991

| Moseley | 19 – 3 | Morley |

The Reddings

16 November 1991

| Plymouth Albion | 25 – 10 | Liverpool St Helens |

Beacon Park

16 November 1991

| Sale | 19 – 15 | Newcastle Gosforth |

Heywood Road

16 November 1991

| Waterloo | 10 – 6 | Coventry |

St Anthony's Road

Bye/s: West Hartlepool

=== Round 2 ===
23 November 1991

| Coventry | 15 – 32 | London Scottish |

Coundon Road

23 November 1991

| Liverpool St Helens | 6 – 22 | Bedford |

Moss Lane

23 November 1991

| Morley | 12 – 13 | Sale |

Scatcherd Lane

23 November 1991

| Newcastle Gosforth | 37 – 6 | Waterloo |

Kingston Park

23 November 1991

| Wakefield | 13 – 9 | Morley |

College Grove

23 November 1991

| West Hartlepool | 21 – 4 | Plymouth Albion |

Brierton Lane

Bye/s: Blackheath

=== Round 3 ===
7 December 1991

| Bedford | 6 – 39 | West Hartlepool |

Goldington Road

7 December 1991

| Blackheath | 21 – 13 | Coventry |

Rectory Field

7 December 1991

| London Scottish | 16 – 11 | Newcastle Gosforth |

Athletic Ground

7 December 1991

| Moseley | 33 – 3 | Liverpool St Helens |

The Reddings

7 December 1991

| Sale | 37 – 3 | Wakefield |

Heywood Road

7 December 1991

| Waterloo | 16 – 9 | Morley |

St Anthony's Road

Bye/s: Plymouth Albion

=== Round 4 ===
14 December 1991

| Blackheath | 0 – 39 | Newcastle Gosforth |

Rectory Field

14 December 1991

| Liverpool St Helens | 11 – 38 | Sale |

Moss Lane

14 December 1991

| Morley | 12 – 13 | London Scottish |

Scatcherd Lane

14 December 1991

| Plymouth Albion | 24 – 9 | Bedford |

Beacon Park

14 December 1991

| Wakefield | 24 – 18 | Waterloo |

College Grove

14 December 1991

| West Hartlepool | 27 – 4 | Moseley |

Brierton Lane

Bye/s: Coventry

=== Round 5 ===
21 December 1991

| Blackheath | 3 – 9 | Morley |

Rectory Field

21 December 1991

| Coventry | 6 – 30 | Newcastle Gosforth |

Coundon Road

21 December 1991

| London Scottish | 31 – 4 | Wakefield |

Athletic Ground

21 December 1991

| Moseley | 15 – 10 | Plymouth Albion |

The Reddings

21 December 1991

| Sale | 13 – 15 | West Hartlepool |

Heywood Road

21 December 1991

| Waterloo | 40 – 12 | Liverpool St Helens |

St Anthony's Road

Bye/s: Bedford

=== Round 6 ===
4 January 1992

| Bedford | 8 – 9 | Moseley |

Goldington Road

4 January 1992

| Liverpool St Helens | 4 – 41 | London Scottish |

Moss Lane

4 January 1992

| Morley | 12 – 16 | Coventry |

Scatcherd Lane

4 January 1992

| Plymouth Albion | 10 – 15 | Sale |

Beacon Park

4 January 1992

| Wakefiel | 20 – 6 | Blackheath |

College Grove

4 January 1992

| West Hartlepool | 27 – 9 | Waterloo |

Brierton Lane

Bye/s: Newcastle Gosforth

=== Round 7 ===
11 January 1992

| Blackheath | 9 – 6 | Liverpool St Helens |

Rectory Field

11 January 1992

| Coventry | 21 – 10 | Wakefield |

Coundon Road

11 January 1992

| London Scottish | 7 – 6 | West Hartlepool |

Athletic Ground

11 January 1992

| Newcastle Gosforth | 60 – 12 | Morley |

Kingston Park

11 January 1992

| Sale | 16 – 6 | Bedford |

Heywood Road

11 January 1992

| Waterloo | 12 – 3 | Plymouth Albion |

St Anthony's Road

Bye/s: Moseley

=== Round 8 ===
8 February 1992

| Bedford | P – P | Waterloo |

Goldington Road

- Postponed. Game rescheduled to 4 April 1992.

8 February 1992

| Liverpool St Helens | 0 – 19 | Coventry |

Moss Lane

8 February 1992

| Moseley | P – P | Sale |

The Reddings

- Postponed. Game rescheduled to 4 April 1992.

8 February 1992

| Plymouth Albion | P – P | London Scottish |

Beacon Park

- Postponed. Game rescheduled to 18 April 1992.

8 February 1992

| Wakefield | P – P | Newcastle Gosforth |

College Grove

- Postponed. Game rescheduled to 15 February 1992.

8 February 1992

| West Hartlepool | P – P | Blackheath |

Brierton Lane

- Postponed. Game rescheduled to 15 February 1992.

Bye/s: Morley

=== Round 8 (rescheduled games) ===
15 February 1992

| Wakefield | 8 – 18 | Newcastle Gosforth |

College Grove

- Game rescheduled from 8 February 1992.

15 February 1992

| West Hartlepool | 21 – 8 | Blackheath |

Brierton Lane

- Game rescheduled from 8 February 1992.

=== Round 9 ===
29 February 1992

| Blackheath | 16 – 20 | Plymouth Albion |

Rectory Field

29 February 1992

| Coventry | 18 – 24 | West Hartlepool |

Coundon Road

29 February 1992

| London Scottish | 38 – 0 | Bedford |

Athletic Ground

29 February 1992

| Morley | 9 – 13 | Wakefield |

Scatcherd Lane

29 February 1992

| Newcastle Gosforth | 76 – 4 | Liverpool St Helens |

Kingston Park

29 February 1992

| Waterloo | 18 – 17 | Moseley |

St Anthony's Road

Bye/s: Sale

=== Round 10 ===
14 March 1992

| Bedford | 52 – 10 | Blackheath |

Goldington Road

14 March 1992

| Liverpool St Helens | 6 – 49 | Morley |

Moss Lane

14 March 1992

| Moseley | 18 – 25 | London Scottish |

The Reddings

14 March 1992

| Plymouth Albion | 10 – 13 | Coventry |

Beacon Park

14 March 1992

| Sale | 3 – 17 | Waterloo |

Heywood Road

14 March 1992

| West Hartlepool | 13 – 7 | Newcastle Gosforth |

Brierton Lane
Attendance: 7,000

Bye/s: Wakefield

=== Round 11 ===
28 March 1992

| Blackheath | 31 – 6 | Moseley |

Rectory Field

28 March 1992

| Coventry | 19 – 13 | Bedford |

Coundon Road

28 March 1992

| London Scottish | 40 – 13 | Sale |

Athletic Ground

28 March 1992

| Morley | P – P | West Hartlepool |

Scatcherd Lane

- Postponed. Game rescheduled to 27 April 1992.

28 March 1992

| Newcastle Gosforth | 54 – 21 | Plymouth Albion |

Kingston Park

28 March 1992

| Wakefield | 35 – 25 | Liverpool St Helens |

College Grove

Bye/s: Waterloo

=== Round 8 (rescheduled games) ===
4 April 1992

| Bedford | 25 – 4 | Waterloo |

Goldington Road

- Game rescheduled from 8 February 1992.

4 April 1992

| Moseley | 47 – 15 | Sale |

The Reddings

- Game rescheduled from 8 February 1992.

=== Round 12 ===
11 April 1992

| Bedford | 9 – 4 | Newcastle Gosforth |

Goldington Road

11 April 1992

| Moseley | 12 – 22 | Coventry |

The Reddings

11 April 1992

| Plymouth Albion | 10 – 12 | Morley |

Beacon Park

11 April 1992

| Sale | 10 – 14 | Blackheath |

Heywood Road

11 April 1992

| Waterloo | 22 – 15 | London Scottish |

St Anthony's Road

11 April 1992

| West Hartlepool | 7 – 0 | Wakefield |

Brierton Lane

Bye/s: Liverpool St Helens

=== Round 8 (rescheduled game) ===
18 April 1992

| Plymouth Albion | 9 – 10 | London Scottish |

Beacon Park

- Game rescheduled from 8 February 1992.

=== Round 13 ===
25 April 1992

| Blackheath | 6 – 34 | Waterloo |

Rectory Field

25 April 1992

| Coventry | 19 – 12 | Sale |

Coundon Road

25 April 1992

| Liverpool St Helens | 0 – 32 | West Hartlepool |

Moss Lane

25 April 1992

| Morley | 19 – 12 | Bedford |

Scatcherd Lane

25 April 1992

| Newcastle Gosforth | 20 – 26 | Moseley |

Kingston Park

25 April 1992

| Wakefield | 22 – 7 | Plymouth Albion |

College Grove

Bye/s: London Scottish

=== Round 11 (rescheduled game) ===
27 April 1992

| Morley | 13 – 21 | West Hartlepool |

Scatcherd Lane

- Game rescheduled from 28 March 1992.

== See also ==
- 1991–92 National Division 1
- 1991–92 National Division 3
- 1991–92 National Division 4 North
- 1991–92 National Division 4 South
