= Jon Wray =

English rugby league footballer

Personal information
- Full name: Jonathan Wray
- Born: 19 May 1970 (age 55) Leeds district, England

Playing information

Rugby union
Club
Years	Team	Pld	T	G	FG	P
≤1990–90	Morley R.F.C.

Rugby league
- Position: Wing
Club
Years	Team	Pld	T	G	FG	P
1990–95	Castleford	55	14	0	0	56
1995–98	Wakefield Trinity	92	27	0	0	108
1999–00	Hull Kingston Rovers	2	0	0	0	0
2003	Dewsbury Rams	2	0	0	0	0
	Total	151	41	0	0	164

Jonathan Wray (born 19 May 1970) is an English former rugby union and professional rugby league footballer who played in the 1990s and 2000s. He played club level rugby union (RU) for Morley R.F.C., and club level rugby league (RL) for Castleford, Wakefield Trinity and Hull Kingston Rovers, as a wing.

== Background ==
Jon Wray's birth was registered in Leeds district, West Riding of Yorkshire, England.

== Playing career ==
=== Challenge Cup Final appearances ===
Jon Wray played on the wing in Castleford's 12-28 defeat by Wigan in the 1992 Challenge Cup Final during the 1991–92 season at Wembley Stadium, London on Saturday 2 May 1992, in front of a crowd of 77,386.

=== Club career ===
Jon Wray was transferred from Morley R.F.C. to Castleford on 24 October 1990.
