= Staffordshire Senior Cup (rugby union) =

Annual rugby competition

- Sport: Rugby Union
- Instituted: 1976; 50 years ago
- Number of teams: 8
- Country: England
- Holders: Burton (8th title) (2018–19)
- Most titles: Lichfield (13 titles)
- Website: Staffordshire RU website

The Staffordshire Senior Cup is an annual rugby union knock-out club competition organised by the Staffordshire Rugby Union. It was first introduced during the 1976–77 season, with the inaugural winners being Walsall. It is the most important rugby union cup competition in Staffordshire, ahead of the Staffordshire Intermediate Cup and Staffordshire Owen Cup.

The Senior Cup is open to club sides based in Staffordshire and parts of the West Midlands playing in tier 5 (Midlands Premier), tier 6 (Midlands 1 West) and tier 7 (Midlands 2 West (North)) of the English rugby union system. The current format is a knock-out competition with a first round, semi-finals and a final played at a neutral ground in April–May.

== Staffordshire Senior Cup winners ==
Staffordshire Senior Cup Finals
Season	Winner	Score	Runners–up	Venue
1976–77	Walsall			
1977–78	Walsall			
1978–79	Lichfield			
1979–80	Walsall			
1980–81	Walsall			
1981–82	Lichfield			
1982–83	Walsall			
1983–84	Lichfield			
1984–85	Lichfield			
1985–86	Lichfield			
1986–87	Lichfield			
1987–88	Wolverhampton			
1988–89	Stafford			
1989–90	Lichfield			
1990–91	Lichfield			
1991–92	Burton			
1992–93	Stoke-on-Trent			
1993–94	Walsall			
1994–95	Walsall			
1995–96	Stoke-on-Trent			
1996–97	Lichfield		Longton	
1997–98	Longton	15–10	Stafford	Peel Croft, Burton On Trent
1998–99	Walsall			
1999-00	Burton		Longton	
2000–01	Walsall			
2001–02	Walsall			
2002–03	Walsall			
2003–04	Longton			
2004–05	Burton		Longton	
2005–06	Longton			
2006–07	Longton			
2007–08	Longton	17–3	Stoke-on-Trent	Trentham Fields, Longton, Stoke-on-Trent
2008–09	Longton	44–15	Stafford	The Sportsway, Burntwood
2009–10	Longton	22–10	Burton	Hartwell Lane, Barlaston
2010–11	Lichfield	24–22	Burton	Broadway Ground, Walsall
2011–12	Burton	34–22	Tamworth	Cooke Fields, Lichfield
2012–13	Lichfield	31–16	Tamworth	Broadway Ground, Walsall
2013–14	Lichfield	50–18	Walsall	Lilleshall Road, Clayton, Newcastle-Under-Lyme
2014–15	Burton	39–38	Stoke-on-Trent	Bognop Road, Essington
2015–16	Lichfield	39–19	Burton	The Sportsway, Burntwood
2016–17	Burton	27–24	Longton	Cooke Fields, Lichfield
2017–18	Burton	N/A (Note: Burton won the final by default as Longton were unable to raise a team.)	Longton	N/A

== Number of wins ==
- Lichfield (13)
- Walsall (11)
- Burton (8)
- Longton (7)
- Stoke-on-Trent (2)
- Wolverhampton (1)

== See also ==
- Staffordshire RU
- Staffordshire Intermediate Cup
- Staffordshire Owen Cup
- English rugby union system
- Rugby union in England
