= Alfred Bateson =

English rugby union player

- Full name: Alfred Hardy Bateson
- Born: 10 August 1901 Otley, Yorkshire, England
- Died: 21 February 1982 (aged 80) Scarborough, North Yorkshire, England

Rugby union career
- Position: Prop
International career
Years	Team	Apps	(Points)
1930	England	4	(0)

Alfred Hardy Bateson (10 August 1901 – 21 February 1982) was an English international rugby union player.

A front row forward, Bateson played his rugby for hometown club Otley RUFC in Yorkshire.

Bateson was capped four times for England in 1930 and along with Frank Malir was one of two Otley players to debut in the Five nations opener against Wales. He featured in all their Five Nations fixtures.

== See also ==
- List of England national rugby union players
