= Frank Malir =

England international rugby union player

- Full name: Frank William Stewart Malir
- Born: 4 August 1905 British India
- Died: 22 January 1974 (aged 68) Boroughbridge, England

Rugby union career
- Position: Centre
International career
Years	Team	Apps	(Points)
1930	England	3	(0)

Frank William Stewart Malir (4 August 1905 – 22 January 1974) was an English international rugby union player.

Malir was born in British India. His father, a Major, was attached to the Indian Medical Service. He attended Stanley House School (Bridge of Allan), then Woodhouse Grove School, which is where he learned his rugby.

A versatile back, Malir played for the Otley club and became a regular in the Yorkshire representative side from 1927. He won a County Championship with Yorkshire in 1928 and also made his first England trials that year. In 1930, Malir was capped for England in three Five Nations matches, playing as a centre against Wales, Ireland and Scotland. He and Alfred Bateson, who also debuted during the series, were the first Otley players to gain England caps.

Malir's brother Herbert was an England trialist and captained Yorkshire.

== See also ==
- List of England national rugby union players
