= Otley R.U.F.C. =

English rugby union club, based in Otley, West Yorkshire

(England) Otley
- Full name: Otley Rugby Union Football Club
- Union: Yorkshire RFU
- Nickname: Zebras
- Founded: 1865; 161 years ago
- Location: Otley, Leeds, West Yorkshire, England
- Ground: Cross Green (Capacity: 7,000 (852 seats))
- League: National League 2 North
- 2025–26: 11th
Team kit

Official website
- pitchero.com/otley

Otley Rugby Union Football Club is an English rugby union club representing Otley in the City of Leeds, district of West Yorkshire. The club runs two senior teams – the first XV, the Saracens (2nd XV), as well as a full range of junior teams. The first XV play in National League 2 North.

== History ==
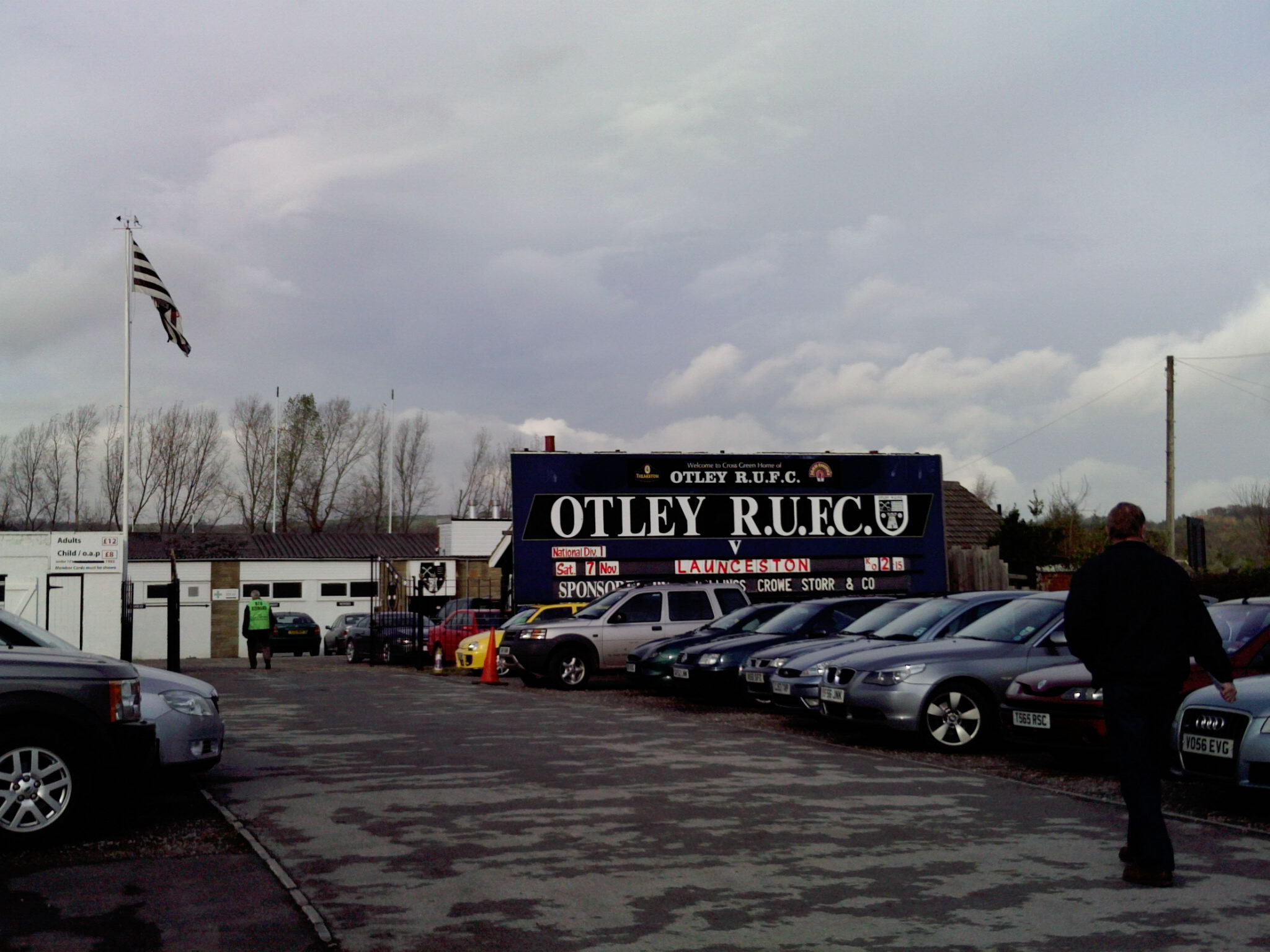
Cross Green Stadium at the homonymous area is Otley's home ground

Otley RUFC was founded in 1865 but broke away from rugby union in 1900 to become a rugby league club. They disbanded in 1906 and reformed as a rugby union club in 1907, the ground being at Wharfeside. In 1909–10 they won the Yorkshire Challenge Cup. Play was suspended during the First World War, but started again in 1919, and on 28 September 1921 they moved to a new and better ground at Cross Green, Otley.

In the 2007–08 season they won the National Division Two title securing an immediate return to National Division One having been relegated the previous season, however they were immediately relegated again in the 2008–09 season along with fellow promoted side Manchester and three other teams due to the new professionalised format of National Division One (now the RFU Championship). Two seasons later the club was relegated again, this time to National League 2 North. The all-time leading try scorer is James Twomey, with 74 in 107 appearances between 2009 and 2013.

In 1979 the stadium was the site of a famous victory by the North of England against the New Zealand ″All Blacks″. The Wallabies suffered the same fate in October, 1988. Cross Green hosted one group game of the 1991 Rugby World Cup, between the United States and Italy which was won by Italy 30–9.

== Current standings ==
2026–27 National League 2 North table
Pos	Team	Pld	W	D	L	PF	PA	PD	TB	LB	Pts	Qualification
1	Sedgley Park	8	8	0	0	420	111	+309	8	0	40	Promotion place
2	Darlington Mowden Park	8	6	0	2	388	159	+229	7	1	32	Promotion play-off
3	Chester	8	6	0	2	315	214	+101	6	1	31	
4	Tynedale	8	6	0	2	252	221	+31	6	0	30	
5	Hull Ionians	7	5	0	2	276	220	+56	7	1	28	
6	Preston Grasshoppers	8	5	0	3	295	235	+60	6	1	27	
7	Harrogate	8	3	1	4	204	328	−124	6	0	20	
8	Sheffield Tigers	8	3	0	5	225	229	−4	5	3	20	
9	Fylde	8	3	0	5	198	253	−55	5	0	17	
10	Billingham	8	3	0	5	222	350	−128	5	0	17	
11	Huddersfield	8	2	1	5	202	362	−160	5	1	16	
12	Heath	8	2	0	6	188	282	−94	4	1	13	Relegation play-off
13	Otley	7	1	0	6	183	292	−109	4	1	9	Relegation place
14	Wharfedale	8	1	0	7	203	315	−112	5	0	9	Relegation place

Updated to match(es) played on 2 September 2026. Source: National League Rugby
Rules for classification: If teams are level at any stage, tiebreakers are applied in the following order:
1. Number of matches won
2. Number of matches drawn
3. Difference between points for and against
4. Total number of points for
5. Aggregate number of points scored in matches between tied teams
6. Number of matches won excluding the first match, then the second and so on until the tie is settled

== Honours ==
- Yorkshire Challenge Cup winners (9 times): 1889, 1910, 1911, 1929, 1931, 1934, 1936, 1937, 1993
- North Division 1 champions: 1989–90
- Courage League - Division 4 North champions: 1990–91
- National League 1 champions (3): 1992–93, 1999–00, 2007–08

== Notable former players ==
- Alfred "Alf" Bateson (England 1930)
- Danny Care
- Albert Fert, (winner of 2007 Nobel Prize for Physics)
- Arthur Gray (Fullback for England while at Otley RUFC in 1947 against Wales, Ireland, and Scotland)
- Frank Malir (England 1930)
- Leslie Manfield (Wales 1938)
- Nigel Melville
- Jimmy Keinhorst
- Neil Spence
