= Morley R.F.C. =

English rugby union club, based in Morley, West Yorkshire

Morley
- Full name: Morley Rugby Football Club
- Union: Yorkshire RFU
- Nickname: Maroons
- Founded: 1878; 148 years ago
- Location: Morley, West Yorkshire, England
- Ground: Scatcherd Lane (Capacity: 6,000 (1,000 seats))
- Chairman: Jamie Poyner
- President: Michael Burton
- Coach(es): Mark Sales, Rob Anderson, Sam Fox
- Captain: Tomas Phipps
- League: Regional 2 North East
- 2024–25: 4th
Team kit

Official website
- www.pitchero.com/clubs/morleyrfc/

Morley Rugby Football Club is a rugby union club based in Morley, West Yorkshire. England. The club are famous for playing in a maroon kit and thus are nicknamed "The Maroons". They currently play in Regional 2 North East, a level six league in the English rugby union league system, following their relegation at the end of the 2017–18 season.

Following a decision in 2026 to introduce 2XVs into the league structure, Morley's 2nd XV entered Counties 3 Yorkshire A division.

== Club history ==
Morley played and won its first match on the 9 November 1878, against Dewsbury Birkdale. Morley was a member of the Northern Union, however, when the Northern Union clubs broke away from the RFU to form what is now rugby league, the Morley representatives missed the train to Huddersfield as they were still in the pub. As a result, Morley remained with the RFU and rugby union.

Ben Gronow was the coach for Morley R.F.C. in the 1930s, however when a history of the club was produced some years later, due to his previous rugby league associations, he was identified as 'unknown' in a team photograph.

When the club won the Yorkshire Cup for the first time in 1932 in its fourth final, Morley borough council granted permission for the municipal coat of arms to be worn on the club's jerseys. The figures and devices on the coat of arms were symbolic of the principal industries of the Borough - the manufacture of woollen cloth, coal mining and quarrying.

When Morley celebrated its centenary in 1978, a rugby ball bearing the club's foundation date replaced the maxim Industria Omnia Vincit (Work Conquers All) beneath the shield.

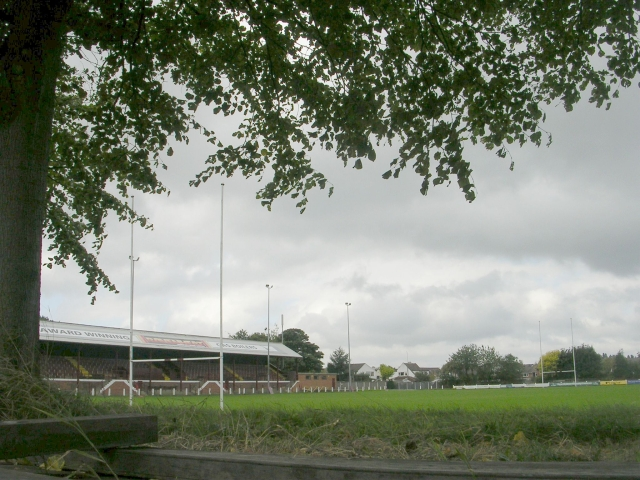
Scatcherd Lane, Morley's ground

Morley have won the Yorkshire Cup 11 times, and 3 times in a row in the 1970s. They also hold claim to being the longest-enduring holders of the cup, having won it in 1938 and 1939. The cup was not contested again until 1947 due to the Second World War. During the war years, the trophy was in held in safe keeping, in a box under the club secretary's bed.

In the early 1990s the club climbed to the national second division (which is now National Division One), the division immediately below today's Premiership. However, by 1996 they had dropped down to the third tier, then called National Division three which today would be National League 1.

2005 was a historic year for Morley as they defeated Westoe RFC to win The Powergen Intermediate Cup at Twickenham. The victory capped a Yorkshire hat trick as on the same day Sheffield Tigers won the Powergen Junior Vase and Leeds Tykes defeated Bath in the final of the Powergen Cup.

In 2005–06 the club was promoted as champions from the Powergen League North 1 and in 2006 Morley were again at Twickenham reaching the cup final for the second successive year. However, they failed in attempting to become the first team to retain the cup, losing 11-6 to Stockport in a below par performance. However, the season was still a great success as Morley finished as league champions and clinched promotion.

In the 2006–07 season the team finished 6th in the league (a mid-table position). However, in the 2007–08 season Morley were relegated from National Division Three North to North 1. In the 2008–09 season despite a slow start Morley finished strongly and ended the season in 3rd position in the league, narrowly missing out on promotion.

In the 2009–10 season Morley had an excellent season, losing just 3 league games. As a result, they finished top of the league and gained promotion into National Division 2 North for 2010–11 season.

Recent seasons have been less kind to the club and they were soon back in National 3 North and have been relegated again and for the 2012–13 season found themselves in the sixth tier, North 1 East. Since then they have been a "yo-yo" team, going between levels five and six. Each relegation brought instant promotion (albeit via the playoffs) but Morley has been unable to consolidate their position at level five and are once again (2018-19) at level 6, North 1 East.

== Notable former players ==
- Harry Bedford won caps for England (RU) while at Morley R.F.C. against New Zealand Natives on 16 February 1889 at Rectory Field, Blackheath, London, and in 1890 against Scotland, and Ireland.
- (England) Kenneth Hirst
- George Herbert Marsden, won caps for England (RU) while at Morley R.F.C. in 1900 against Wales, Ireland, and Scotland, and won a cap for England (RL) while at for Bradford (now Bradford Park Avenue A.F.C.) in 1905 against Other Nationalities.
- John Shooter, won caps for England (RU) while at Morley R.F.C. in 1899 against Ireland, and Scotland, and in 1900 against Ireland, and Scotland.
- (England) Jon Wray played for Morley before moving to play professional rugby league for Castelford, appearing in the 1992 Challenge Cup final.
- John Orwin, former England captain, played for and captained Morley gaining promotion to the 1991–92 Courage League National Division Two.
- (England) Craig Emmerson was the first player to ever have a transfer fee paid for them when he moved from Morley to Premiership club Gloucester Rugby in 1995 just as professionalism had been passed by World Rugby.
- (England) Dan McFarland played for Morley before playing professionally with Richmond, Stade Français and Connacht. He went on to become assistant coach of the Scotland national rugby union team and head coach of Ulster Rugby.
- Scott Benton played for Morley before moving to Premiership club Gloucester Rugby in 1997 and winning 1 cap for England.
- Thomas Isherwood played a season at Morley before making his debut for the Canada Sevens in 2021.

== Ground ==
Morley play home games at Scatcherd Lane, based in the heart of Morley with good transport links. Facilities at the ground include a club-house, gym, two pitches with floodlights and a grandstand alongside the main pitch. Ground capacity is around 6,000, with 1,000 seats in the grandstand and space for up to 5,000 standing.

== Honours ==
- Yorkshire Cup winners (11): 1932, 1938, 1939, 1953, 1955, 1972, 1973, 1974, 1977, 1979, 1996
- Powergen Intermediate Cup winners: 2005
- National League 3 North (formerly North Division 1) champions (2): 2005–06, 2009–10
- North 1 (east v west) promotion play-off winners (2): 2012–13, 2015–16
