= 1993–94 National Division 5 North =

Rugby union competition in England

- Countries: England
- Champions: Rotherham (1st title)
- Runners-up: Preston Grasshoppers (not promoted)
- Relegated: Bradford & Bingley; Durham City

The 1993–94 National Division 5 North was the seventh full season of rugby union within the fifth tier of the English league system, currently the regional divisions Midlands Premier and North Premier, and the first using the name National Division 5 North, with its counterpart being National Division 5 South. The introduction of a new National Division 4 meant that the old National Division 4 North and South were merged and two new regional leagues introduced at tier 5.

Rotherham finished the season as champions and were promoted to the 1994–95 National Division 4. The bottom two sides were Durham City and Bradford & Bingley, both relegated to North Division 1.

== Structure ==
Each team played home and away matches against each of the other teams, playing a total of twenty-two matches each. The champions are promoted to National Division 4 while the bottom two teams are relegated to either Midlands Division 1 or North Division 1 depending on their locality.

== Participating teams and locations ==
Locations of the 1993–94 National Division 5 North teams

Team	Ground	Capacity	City/Area	Previous Season
Birmingham & Solihull	Sharmans Cross	4,000	Solihull, West Midlands	Promoted from Midlands 1 (champions)
Bradley & Bingley	Wagon Lane	4,000	Bingley, West Yorkshire	Promoted from North 1 (champions)
Durham City	Hollow Drift	3,000 (500 seats)	Durham, County Durham	Relegated from National 4 North (8th)
Kendal	Mint Bridge	4,600 (600 seats)	Kendal, Cumbria	Relegated from National 4 North (6th)
Hereford	Wyeside	3,200 (200 seats)	Hereford, Herefordshire	Relegated from National 4 North (11th)
Lichfield	Cooke Fields	5,460 (460 seats)	Lichfield, Staffordshire	Relegated from National 4 North (5th)
Nuneaton	Harry Cleaver Ground	5,000 (650 seats)	Nuneaton, Warwickshire	Relegated from National 4 North (12th)
Preston Grasshoppers	Lightfoot Green	2,250 (250 seats)	Preston, Lancashire	Relegated from National 4 North (3rd)
Rotherham	Clifton Lane	2,500	Rotherham, South Yorkshire	Relegated from National 4 North (2nd)
Stoke-on-Trent	Hartwell Lane	2,000	Barlaston, Staffordshire	Relegated from National 4 North (4th)
Stourbridge	Stourton Park	2,000	Stourbridge, West Midlands	Relegated from National 4 North (9th)
Walsall	Broadway	2,500 (500 seats)	Walsall, West Midlands	Relegated from National 4 North (7th)
Winnington Park	Burrows Hill	5,000	Norwich, Cheshire	Relegated from National 4 North (10th)

== League table ==
1993–94 National Division 5 North table
Pos	Team	Pld	W	D	L	PF	PA	PD	Pts	Qualification
1	Rotherham (C)	12	10	1	1	335	142	+193	21	Promoted
2	Preston Grasshoppers	12	10	0	2	191	142	+49	20	
3	Walsall	12	7	0	5	166	148	+18	14	
4	Winnington Park	12	6	1	5	227	132	+95	13	
5	Stourbridge	12	6	0	6	162	188	−26	12	
6	Stoke-on-Trent	12	5	1	6	153	167	−14	11	
7	Lichfield	12	5	0	7	118	138	−20	10	
8	Hereford	12	4	2	6	126	153	−27	10	
9	Birmingham & Solihull	12	5	0	7	128	162	−34	10	
10	Kendal	12	4	1	7	142	171	−29	9	
11	Nuneaton	12	4	1	7	122	200	−78	9	
12	Durham City (R)	12	4	1	7	159	279	−120	9	Relegated
13	Bradley & Bingley (R)	12	4	0	8	189	210	−21	8	Relegated

Rules for classification: Points are awarded as follows: 2 pts for a win, 1 pt for a draw, 0 pts for a loss. If teams are level at any stage, difference between points for and against applies.
(C) Champions; (R) Relegated

== See also ==
- 1993-94 National Division 1
- 1993–94 National Division 2
- 1993–94 National Division 3
- 1993–94 National Division 5 South
