= 1994–95 National Division 4 =

English rugby union season

- Countries: England
- Champions: Rotherham (1st title)
- Runners-up: Reading (also promoted)
- Relegated: Broughton Park, Askeans
- Matches played: 162

The 1994–95 National Division 4 was the eighth full season of rugby union within the fourth tier of the English league system, currently the regional divisions National League 2 South and National League 2 North, and the second using the name National Division 4. At the end of the season Rotherham finished as worthy champions, with just one defeat throughout the campaign to claim promotion to the 1995–96 National Division 3. They were joined by runners up Reading, who despite finishing 5 points behind were still well ahead of the chasing pack. It was quite an achievement by both sides who had only just been promoted into the division, having won their respective leagues the previous year.

The relegation battle was keenly contested by three sides but in the end it was Askeans and Broughton Park who went down, with 8th placed Plymouth Albion just 1 point clear in safety, although their for/against points was far superior. Askeans would drop to Courage League Division 5 South while Broughton Park fell to Courage League Division 5 North.

== Structure ==
Each team played home and away matches against each of the other teams, playing a total of eighteen matches each. The champions and runners up are promoted to National Division 3 while the bottom two teams are relegated to either Courage League Division 5 North or Courage League Division 5 South depending on their locality.

== Participating teams and locations ==
1994–95 National Division 4 teams in England

Team	Stadium	Capacity	City/Area	Previous season
Askeans	Broad Walk	1,500 (300 seats)	Kidbrooke, London	Relegated from National 3 (10th)
Aspatria	Bower Park	3,000 (300 seats)	Aspatria, Cumbria	5th
Broughton Park	Chelsfield Grove	2,000 (400 seats)	Chorlton-cum-Hardy, Manchester	8th
Havant	Hook's Lane	2,000 (200 seats) (Note: Hook's Lane capacity re-estimated from 3,000 (200 seats) down to 2,000 (200 seats) for the 1994–95 season.)	Havant, Hampshire	Relegated from National 3 (9th)
Leeds	Clarence Fields	7,850 (850 seats)	Leeds, West Yorkshire	6th
Liverpool St Helens	Moss Lane	4,370 (370 seats)	St Helens, Merseyside	3rd
Plymouth Albion	Beacon Park	1,950 (450 seats)	Plymouth, Devon	4th
Reading	Holme Park		Reading, Berkshire	Promoted from National 5 South (1st)
Redruth	Recreation Ground	12,000	Redruth, Cornwall	Relegated from National 3 (10th)
Rotherham	Clifton Lane	2,500	Rotherham, South Yorkshire	Promoted from National 5 North (1st)

== League table ==
1994–95 National Division 4 table
Pos	Team	Pld	W	D	L	PF	PA	PD	Pts	Qualification
1	Rotherham (C)	18	17	0	1	576	267	+309	34	Promoted
2	Reading (P)	18	14	1	3	435	319	+116	29	Promoted
3	Liverpool St Helens	18	10	3	5	374	243	+131	23	
4	Havant	18	10	2	6	390	330	+60	22	
5	Aspatria	18	7	1	10	265	378	−113	15	
6	Leeds	18	8	0	10	335	291	+44	14	
7	Redruth	18	6	2	10	309	387	−78	14	
8	Plymouth Albion	18	4	2	12	324	381	−57	10	
9	Askeans (R)	18	4	1	13	257	451	−194	9	Relegated
10	Broughton Park (R)	18	4	0	14	217	435	−218	8	Relegated

Rules for classification: Points are awarded as follows: 2 pts for a win, 1 pt for a draw, 0 pts for a loss. If teams are level at any stage, difference between points for and against applies.
(C) Champions; (P) Promoted; (R) Relegated

== Sponsorship ==
National Division 4 is part of the Courage Clubs Championship and is sponsored by Courage Brewery.

== See also ==
- 1994–95 National Division 1
- 1994–95 National Division 2
- 1994–95 National Division 3
- 1994–95 Courage League Division 5 North
- 1994–95 Courage League Division 5 South
