= 1993–94 National Division 5 South =

Rugby union competition in England

- Countries: England
- Champions: Reading (1st title)
- Runners-up: Lydney (not promoted)
- Relegated: Maidstone; Southend

The 1993–94 National Division 5 South was the seventh full season of rugby union within the fifth tier of the English league system, currently the regional divisions Regional 1 South East and Regional 1 South West, and the first using the name National Division 5 South, with its counterpart being National Division 5 North. The introduction of a new National Division 4 meant that the old National Division 4 North and South was merged and two new regional leagues introduced at tier 5.

Newly promoted Reading finished the season as champions and gained promotion to the 1994–95 National Division 4, while Maidstone and Southend finished as the bottom two sides, both being relegated down to London Division 1.

== Structure ==
Each team played home and away matches against each of the other teams, playing a total of twenty-two matches each. The champions are promoted to National Division 4 while the bottom two teams are relegated to either London & South East Division 1 or South West Division 1 depending on their locality.

== Participating teams and locations ==
Locations of the 1993–94 National Division 5 South South teams

Team	Ground	Capacity	City/Area	Previous season
Basingstoke	Down Grange	2,500	Basingstoke, Hampshire	Relegated from National 4 South (5th)
Berry Hill (7th)	Lakers Road		Coleford, Gloucestershire	Relegated from National 4 South
Camborne	Recreation Ground	11,000	Camborne, Cornwall	Relegated from National 4 South (4th)
High Wycombe	Kingsmead Road		High Wycombe, Buckinghamshire	Relegated from National 4 South (8th)
London Welsh	Old Deer Park	4,500 (1,500 seats)	Richmond, London (2nd)	Relegated from National 4 South (2nd)
Lydney	Regentsholm	3,000 (340 seats)	Lydney, Gloucestershire	Relegated from National 4 South (3rd)
Maidstone	William Davey Memorial	2,000 (100 seats)	Maidstone, Kent	Relegated from National 4 South (12th)
Metropolitan Police	Imber Court	3,500 (500 seats)	East Molesey, Surrey	Relegated from National 4 South (9th)
North Walsham	Norwich Road	1,200	Scottow, Norfolk	Relegated from National 4 South (11th)
Reading	Holme Park		Sonning, Berkshire	Promoted from South West 1 (champions)
Southend	Warners Park	1,500 (150 seats)	Southend, Essex	Relegated from National 4 South (6th)
Tabard	Cobden Hill		Radlett, Hertfordshire	Promoted from London 1 (champions)
Weston-super-Mare	Recreation Ground	3,000	Weston-super-Mare, Somerset	Relegated from National 4 South (10th)

== League table ==
1993–94 National Division 5 South table
Pos	Team	Pld	W	D	L	PF	PA	PD	Pts	Qualification
1	Reading (C)	12	10	1	1	248	61	+187	21	Promoted
2	Lydney	12	7	2	3	181	111	+70	16	
3	Tabard	12	6	2	4	183	136	+47	14	
4	Camborne	12	6	2	4	197	180	+17	14	
5	Weston-super-Mare	12	7	0	5	163	180	−17	14	
6	London Welsh	12	5	3	4	216	140	+76	13	
7	Berry Hill	12	6	1	5	146	154	−8	13	
8	North Walsham	12	5	2	5	148	136	+12	12	
9	High Wycombe	12	5	1	6	120	173	−53	11	
10	Metropolitan Police	12	5	0	7	167	174	−7	10	
11	Basingstoke	12	5	0	7	191	210	−19	10	
12	Southend (R)	12	3	0	9	203	208	−5	6	Relegated
13	Maidstone (R)	12	1	0	11	86	386	−300	2	Relegated

Rules for classification: Points are awarded as follows: 2 pts for a win, 1 pt for a draw, 0 pts for a loss. If teams are level at any stage, difference between points for and against applies.
(C) Champions; (R) Relegated

== See also ==
- 1993-94 National Division 1
- 1993–94 National Division 2
- 1993–94 National Division 3
- 1993–94 National Division 5 North
