= Sussex 3 =

English rugby union league

- Current season or competition: 2016–17 Sussex Oranjeboom Division 3
- Sport: Rugby union
- Instituted: 1987; 39 years ago
- Number of teams: 12
- Country: England
- Holders: Hastings & Bexhill II (1st title) (2016–17) (promoted to Sussex Canterbury Jack Intermediate)
- Most titles: Ditchling, Old Brightonian, Rye, Uckfield II (2 titles)
- Website: www.sussexrugby.co.uk

Sussex 3 (known as Sussex Oranjeboom Division 3 for sponsorship reasons) is an English level 11 Rugby Union League. It is run by the Sussex Rugby Football Union and was originally for teams predominantly from West Sussex until a division reorganization for the 2016-17 meant that clubs from East Sussex would also take part. Promoted teams move up to Sussex 2 while relegated teams drop down to either Sussex Asahi Division 4 East or Sussex Late Red Division 4 West depending on geography. Sussex Oranjeboom 2 West was introduced in 2010–11 and is the equivalent to former division Sussex 3 which had its last season in 2003–04. It changed to its current name of Sussex Oranjeboom Division 3 in 2016–17.

== Original teams ==
When league rugby began in 1987 this division contained the following teams:

- Arun
- Brighton Polytechnic
- Ditchling
- Sunallon (Note: Sunallon would first rename to Sun Alliance in 1994 and then its current name of Holbrook RFC.)
- Midhurst
- Newick
- Pulborough
- Robin Hood

== Sussex 3 honours ==
=== Sussex 3 (1987–1992) ===
The original Sussex 3 was a tier 10 league with promotion up to Sussex 1 and there was no relegation down as it was the lowest level of the league system. The division was cancelled at the end of the 1991–92 season.

Sussex 3
Season	No of Teams	Champions	Runners–up	Relegated Teams
1987–88	8	Old Brightonian	RMP Chichester (Note: Despite winning promotion, runners up RMP Chichester would drop out of the Sussex leagues the following season, only to reappear in Sussex 2 for the 1989–90 season.)	No relegation
1988–89	7	Pulborough	Brighton Polytechnic (Note: 3rd place Midhurst also promoted.)	No relegation
1989–90	6	Ditchling	West Sussex Institute	No relegation
1990–91	5	BA Wingspan	Newick	No relegation
1991–92	4	Sunallon	Plumpton (Note: The cancellation of Sussex 3 meant that all four teams in the division were to be promoted to Sussex 2 at the end of the season - however, 3rd and 4th place University of Sussex and Arun decided to drop out of the Sussex leagues at the end of the season.)	No relegation
Green backgrounds are promotion places.

=== Sussex 3 (1994-1996) ===
After an absence of two years, Sussex 3 was reintroduced for the 1994–95 season as a tier 11 league. Promotion was to Sussex 2 and there was no relegation due to Sussex 3 being the lowest level in the league system.

Sussex 3
Season	No of Teams	Champions	Runners–up	Relegated Teams
1994–95	5	Rye	Shoreham	No relegation
1995–96	6	Sussex Police	Plumpton	No relegation
Green backgrounds are promotion places.

=== Sussex 3 (1996-2000) ===
The cancellation of National 5 South at the end of the 1995–96 season meant that Sussex 3 reverted to being a tier 10 league. Promotion continued to Sussex 2 and there was no relegation. Sussex 3 was cancelled for the second time at the end of the 1999–00 season, with the majority of teams transferred into the new Sussex 2 East or Sussex 2 West (formerly a single Sussex 2 division).

Sussex 3
Season	No of Teams	Champions	Runners–up	Relegated Teams
1996–97	6	Shoreham	Rye	No relegation
1997–98	6	Chichester IHE	Robertsbridge	No relegation
1998–99	6	Plumpton	Sussex Police	No relegation
1999–00	6	Rye	St. Francis (Note: Six teams in this division would be promoted to Sussex 2 for the next season as Sussex 3 was to be abolished and would not return until 2002–03.)	No relegation
Green backgrounds are promotion places.

=== Sussex 3 (2002-2004) ===
After an absence of two years, Sussex 3 returned for the 2002–03 season, now as a tier 11 league. Promotion was to Sussex 2 and there was no relegation. After just two seasons, Sussex 3 was cancelled for the third time in its history.

Sussex 3
Season	No of Teams	Champions	Runners–up	Relegated Teams
2002–03	6	Old Brightonian	Ditchling	No relegation
2003–04	6	Ditchling (Note: As Sussex 3 was to be abolished for the following season no teams were promoted. An equivalent division would return in 2010-11 in the form of Asahi 2 East and Oranjeboom 2 West.)	Plumpton	No relegation
Green backgrounds are promotion places.

=== Sussex 2 East / Sussex 2 West (2010–2016) ===
Sussex 3 was reintroduced for the 2010–11 season in the form of two regional divisions - Sussex "Asahi" 2 East and Sussex "Oranjeboom" 2 West - both sitting at tier 11 of the league system. Promotion was to Sussex Canterbury Jack Intermediate (renamed back to Sussex 2 for the 2015–16 season onward) and relegation to either Sussex 3 East or Sussex 3 West.

Sussex 2 East / Sussex 2 West
Season	No of Teams	Champions	Runners–up	Relegated Teams	League Name
2010–11	8	Uckfield II	Ditchling	Heathfield & Waldron IV	Sussex 2 East
2010–11	11	Midhurst	Littlehampton	Brighton III, Worthing Senior I	Sussex 2 West
2011–12	10	Hellingly	Hastings & Bexhill II	Haywards Heath III, Hove V, Eastbourne III	Sussex 2 East
2011–12	10	Horley	Hove IV	Bognor III, Holbrook II	Sussex 2 West
2012–13	8	East Grinstead III	Heathfield & Waldron III	Newick II, Rye 2nd XV	Sussex 2 East
2012–13	10	Horsham II	Worthing Senior I	Shoreham II (Veterans)	Sussex 2 West
2013–14	9	Eastbourne II	Burgess Hill II	Lewes III (Note: Lewes III would withdraw from the league for the following season.)	Sussex 2 East
2013–14	9	Bognor II	Sussex Police	No relegation (Note: There was no relegation as Bishop's Finger 3 East was abolished the following season.)	Sussex 2 West
2014–15	12	Uckfield II	Plumpton	Worthing Senior III	Sussex 2 East
2014–15	12	Pulborough II	Norfolk Arms	Shoreham II (Veterans)	Sussex 2 West
2015–16	10	Newick	Hastings & Bexhill II	Lewes II	Sussex 2 East
2015–16	11	Barns Green	Brighton III	Burgess Hill III	Sussex 2 West
Green backgrounds are promotion places.

=== Sussex 3 (2016–onward) ===
For the 2016–17 season, Sussex 3 was remerged back into a single division at tier 11 of the league system. Promotion was to Sussex 2 and relegation to Sussex 4.

Sussex 3
Season	No of Teams	Champions	Runners–up	Relegated Teams
2016–17	12	Hastings & Bexhill II	Plumpton	Norfolk Arms
2017–18	12			
Green backgrounds are promotion places.

== Number of league titles ==
- Ditchling (2)
- Old Brightonian (2)
- Rye (2)
- Uckfield II (2) (Note: Both of Uckfield II's titles were for Sussex Asahi 2 East.)
- BA Wingspan (1)
- Barns Green (1) (Note: Barns Green's title was for Sussex Oranjeboom 2 West.)
- Bognor II (1) (Note: Bognor II's title was for Sussex Oranjeboom 2 West.)
- Chichester IHE (1)
- East Grinstead III (1) (Note: East Grinstead III's title was for Sussex Asahi 2 East.)
- Eastbourne II (1) (Note: Eastbourne II's title was for Sussex Asahi 2 East.)
- Hellingly (1) (Note: Hellingly's title was for Sussex Asahi 2 East.)
- Horley (1) (Note: Horley's title was for Sussex Oranjeboom 2 West.)
- Horsham II (1) (Note: Horsham II's title was for Sussex Oranjeboom 2 West.)
- Midhurst (1) (Note: Midhurst's title was for Sussex Oranjeboom 2 West.)
- Newick (1) (Note: Newick's title was for Sussex Asahi 2 East.)
- Plumpton (1)
- Pulborough (1) (Note: As a club Pulborough have won Sussex 3 twice - once with the 1st XV, once with the 2nd XV.)
- Pulborough II (1) (Note: Pulborough II's title was for Sussex Oranjeboom 2 West.)
- Shoreham (1)
- Sunallon (1) (Note: Sunallon are currently known as Holbrook RFC.)
- Sussex Police (1)

== See also ==
- London & SE Division RFU
- Sussex RFU
- English rugby union system
- Rugby union in England
