= 1992–93 National Division 3 =

Rugby union competition in England

- Countries: England
- Champions: Otley (1st title)
- Runners-up: Havant
- Relegated: Multiple teams (Note: League restructuring meant that 8 teams from National Division 3 would be relegated into the new National Division 4.)
- Top point scorer: 122 – Andy Green (Exeter)
- Top try scorer: 8 – M Kelly (Broughton Park); Mark Sephton (Liverpool St Helens)

The 1992–93 National Division 3 (sponsored by Courage Brewery) was the sixth season of the third tier of the English rugby union league system, the Courage Clubs Championship, currently known as National League 1. New sides to the division included Liverpool St Helens and Plymouth (relegated from tier 2) and Aspatria and Havant (promoted from tier 2), with number of teams was reduced from thirteen to twelve teams following the merger of Leeds based sides, Headingley and Roundhay, to form Leeds RUFC.

Otley finished the season as champions and were promoted to the 1993–94 National Division 2 while eight teams dropped into the new 1993–94 National Division 4.

== Structure ==
Each team played one match against each of the other teams, playing a total of twelve matches each. RFU restructuring of the English rugby union league system ahead of the 1993–94 season, including the merger of National League 2 North and South into a single National Division 4 and the introduction of National Division 5, meant that just one team would be promoted into National Division 2 and eight teams relegated to the new National Division 5.

== Participating teams and locations ==
1992–93 National Division 3 teams in England

Team	Stadium	Capacity	City/Area	Previous season
Askeans	Broad Walk	1,500 (300 seats)	Kidbrooke, London	7th
Aspatria	Bower Park	3,000 (300 seats)	Aspatria, Cumbria	Promoted from National 4 North (1st)
Broughton Park	Chelsfield Grove	2,000 (400 seats)	Chorlton-cum-Hardy, Manchester	6th
Clifton	Station Road	2,200 (200 seats)	Cribbs Causeway, Henbury, Bristol	3rd
Exeter	County Ground	5,750 (750 seats)	Exeter, Devon	4th
Havant	Hook's Lane	3,000 (200 seats)	Havant, Hampshire	Promoted from National 4 South (1st)
Leeds (Note: Headingley and Roundhay merged to form Leeds RUFC at the start of the 1992-93 season.)	Clarence Fields (Note: The old ground of Headingley, Clarence Fields was chosen to host Leeds league fixtures for the 1992–93 season with Rounday's home ground Chandos Park used for friendly fixtures.)	7,850 (850 seats)	Leeds, West Yorkshire	N/A (Note: Headingley had finished 11th and Roundhay 10th the prior season before merging to form Leeds RUFC.)
Liverpool St Helens	Moss Lane	4,370 (370 seats)	St Helens, Merseyside	Relegated from National 2 (13th)
Otley	Cross Green	7,000 (852 seats)	Otley, West Yorkshire	9th
Plymouth Albion	Beacon Park	1,950 (450 seats)	Plymouth, Devon	Relegated from National 2 (12th)
Redruth	Recreation Ground	12,000	Redruth, Cornwall	5th
Sheffield	Abbeydale Park	3,300 (100 seats) (Note: Although a 1990 club estimate was 1,100 (100 seated and 1,000 standing) this is very conservative as Abbeydale Park would experience 3,000+ crowds several times in later history in what was a relatively unchanged ground.)	Dore, Sheffield, South Yorkshire	8th

== League table ==
1992–93 National Division 3 table
Pos	Team	Pld	W	D	L	PF	PA	PD	Pts	Qualification
1	Otley (C)	11	8	1	2	274	118	+156	17	Promoted
2	Havant	11	8	1	2	185	93	+92	17	
3	Exeter	11	8	1	2	247	169	+78	17	
4	Redruth	11	7	2	2	175	125	+50	16	
5	Sheffield (R)	11	7	0	4	208	134	+74	14	Relegated
6	Leeds (R)	11	7	0	4	228	220	+8	14	Relegated
7	Liverpool St Helens (R)	11	5	0	6	203	130	+73	10	Relegated
8	Clifton (R)	11	4	2	5	206	175	+31	10	Relegated
9	Aspatria (R)	11	3	1	7	170	308	−138	7	Relegated
10	Askeans (R)	11	3	0	8	132	300	−168	6	Relegated
11	Broughton Park (R)	11	2	0	9	136	217	−81	4	Relegated
12	Plymouth Albion (R)	11	0	0	11	130	305	−175	0	Relegated

Rules for classification: Points are awarded as follows: 2 pts for a win, 1 pt for a draw, 0 pts for a loss. If teams are level at any stage, the following tiebreaker is applied: Difference between points for and against.
(C) Champions; (R) Relegated

== See also ==
- 1992–93 National Division 1
- 1992–93 National Division 2
- 1992–93 National Division 4 North
- 1992–93 National Division 4 South
