= 1994–95 National Division 1 =

Rugby union competition in England

- Countries: England
- Date: 10 September 1995 – 4 May 1995
- Champions: Leicester (2nd title)
- Runners-up: Bath
- Relegated: Northampton
- Matches played: 90

Official website
- www.premiershiprugby.com

The 1994–95 National Division 1 (sponsored by Courage Brewery) was the eighth season of the top tier of the English rugby union league system, the Courage Clubs Championship, currently known as Premiership Rugby. Bath were the defending champions and West Hartlepool and Sale were the promoted teams. This was the first Courage League season to be shown live on Sky Sports.

Leicester were the eventual champions, beating Bath by four points, claiming their second league title. The battle to avoid relegation was extremely keenly fought, with Northampton being the sole relegated side to the 1995–96 National Division 2 after Gloucester managed to draw their rescheduled game against Bath, meaning that the Kingsholm side stayed up instead.

== Structure ==
Each side played one another twice, in a round robin system, home and away, to make a total of eighteen matches for each team. The team that finishes bottom would be relegated to National Division 2.

== Participating teams ==
Locations of the 1994–95 Courage League National Division One teams

Team	Stadium	Capacity	City/Area	Previous season
Bath	Recreation Ground	8,300 (1,000 seats)	Bath, Somerset	Champions
Bristol	Memorial Stadium	8,500 (1,200 seats)	Bristol, Avon	4th
Gloucester	Kingsholm	12,000	Gloucester, Gloucestershire	8th
Harlequins	The Stoop	9,000 (2,000 seats)	Twickenham, London	6th
Leicester	Welford Road	14,700 (9,200 seats)	Leicester, Leicestershire	2nd
Northampton	Franklin's Gardens	6,000 (2,000 seats)	Northampton, Northamptonshire	5th
Orrell	Edge Hall Road	5,300 (300 seats)	Orrell, Greater Manchester	7th
Sale	Heywood Road	4,000 (500 seats)	Sale, Greater Manchester	Promoted from National 2 (1st)
Wasps	Repton Avenue	3,200 (1,200 seats)	Sudbury, London	3rd
West Hartlepool	Brierton Lane	7,000	Hartlepool, County Durham	Promoted from National 2 (2nd)

== Table ==
Pos	Team	Pld	W	D	L	PF	PA	PD	Pts
1	Leicester	18	15	1	2	400	239	+161	31
2	Bath	18	12	3	3	373	245	+128	27
3	Wasps	18	13	0	5	469	313	+156	26
4	Sale	18	7	2	9	327	343	−16	16
5	Orrell	18	6	3	9	256	325	−69	15
6	Bristol	18	7	0	11	301	353	−52	14
7	Gloucester	18	6	1	11	269	336	−67	13
8	Harlequins	18	6	1	11	275	348	−73	13
9	West Hartlepool	18	6	1	11	312	412	−100	13
10	Northampton	18	6	0	12	267	335	−68	12

== Results ==
The Home Team is listed in the left column.

Home \ Away	BAT	BRI	GLO	HAR	LEI	NOR	ORR	SAL	WAS	WHA
Bath		18–9	19–19	22–11	20–20	26–6	32–13	13–18	12–9	53–17
Bristol	9–10		21–17	19–14	31–22	13–24	20–9	44–22	24–25	12–17
Gloucester	10–15	19–17		17–28	9–3	14–13	9–6	8–20	16–21	48–12
Harlequins	19–25	9–10	10–14		13–40	10–9	6–8	15–15	26–57	20–10
Leicester	31–21	17–3	16–6	22–8		28–15	29–19	37–20	21–6	33–16
Northampton	16–32	15–18	9–6	16–23	18–20		15–3	9–22	19–13	25–14
Orrell	6–6	20–16	43–14	10–28	0–6	13–10		22–19	10–16	22–22
Sale	3–19	21–9	16–14	19–20	10–20	41–6	8–8		12–17	22–7
Wasps	11–10	27–15	45–8	25–7	18–23	27–21	52–25	52–22		33–22
West Hartlepool	18–20	47–11	22–21	10–8	6–12	12–21	17–19	23–17	20–15	

Legend: Blue = home team win; Yellow = draw; Red = away team win.

== Fixtures & Results ==
=== Round 1 ===
10 September 1994

Bath	18 – 9	Bristol

Recreation Ground
Referee: Brian Campsall

10 September 1994

Leicester	28 – 15	Northampton

Welford Road

10 September 1994

Sale	19 – 20	Harlequins

Heywood Road

10 September 1994

Wasps	45 – 8	Gloucester

Repton Avenue

10 September 1994

West Hartlepool	17 – 19	Orrell

Brierton Lane

=== Round 2 ===
17 September 1994

Bristol	44 – 22	Sale

Memorial Stadium

17 September 1994

Gloucester	48 – 12	West Hartlepool

Kingsholm

17 September 1994

Harlequins	26 – 57	Wasps

The Stoop

17 September 1994

Northampton	16 – 32	Bath

Franklin's Gradens
Referee: Steve Lander

17 September 1994

Orrell	0 – 6	Leicester

Edge Hall Road

=== Round 3 ===
24 September 1994

Bath	32 – 13	Orrell

Recreation Ground
Referee: Ceri Thomas

24 September 1994

Bristol	19 – 14	Harlequins

Memorial Stadium

24 September 1994

Leicester	16 – 6	Gloucester

Welford Road

24 September 1994

Sale	41 – 6	Northampton

Heywood Road

24 September 1994

West Hartlepool	20 – 15	Wasps

Brierton Lane

=== Round 4 ===
1 October 1994

Gloucester	10 – 15	Bath

Kingsholm
Attendance: 9,000
Referee: Ed Morrison

1 October 1994

Harlequins	20 – 10	West Hartlepool

The Stoop

1 October 1994

Northampton	15 – 18	Bristol

Franklin's Gardens

1 October 1994

Orrell	22 – 19	Sale

Edge Hall Road

1 October 1994

Wasps	18 – 23	Leicester

Repton Avenue

=== Round 5 ===
8 October 1994

Bath	12 – 9	Wasps

Recreation Ground
Referee: Eddie Murray

8 October 1994

Bristol	20 – 9	Orrell

Memorial Stadium

8 October 1994

Leicester	33 – 16	West Hartlepool

Welford Road

8 October 1994

Northampton	16 – 23	Harlequins

Franklin's Gardens

8 October 1994

Sale	16 – 14	Gloucester

Heywood Road

=== Round 6 ===
15 October 1994

Gloucester	19 – 17	Bristol

Kingsholm

15 October 1994

Harlequins	13 – 40	Leicester

The Stoop

15 October 1994

Orrell	13 – 10	Northampton

Edge Hall Road

15 October 1994

Wasps	52 – 22	Sale

Repton Avenue

15 October 1994

West Hartlepool	18 – 20	Bath

Brierton Lane
Referee: David Leslie

=== Round 7 ===
22 October 1994

Bath	20 – 20	Leicester

Recreation Ground
Referee: Jim Pearson

22 October 1994

Bristol	24 – 25	Wasps

Memorial Stadium

22 October 1994

Harlequins	6 – 8	Orrell

Twickenham Stoop

22 October 1994

Northampton	9 – 6	Gloucester

Franklin's Gardens

22 October 1994

Sale	22 – 7	West Hartlepool

Heywood Road

=== Round 8 ===
29 October 1994

Bath	22 – 11	Harlequins

Recreation Ground
Referee: Matt Bayliss

29 October 1994

Gloucester	9 – 6	Orrell

Kingsholm

29 October 1994

Leicester	37 – 20	Sale

Welford Road

29 October 1994

Wasps	27 – 21	Northampton

Repton Avenue

29 October 1994

West Hartlepool	47 – 21	Bristol

Brierton Lane

=== Round 9 ===
5 November 1994

Bristol	31 – 22	Leicester

Memorial Stadium

5 November 1994

Harlequins	10 – 14	Gloucester

The Stoop

5 November 1994

Northampton	25 – 14	West Hartlepool

Franklin's Gardens

5 November 1994

Orrell	10 – 16	Wasps

Edge Hall Road

5 November 1994

Sale	3 – 19	Bath

Heywood Road
Referee: Steve Lander

=== Round 10 ===
7 January 1995

Bristol	9 – 10	Bath

Memorial Stadium
Attendance: 11,000
Referee: Stuart Piercy

7 January 1995

Gloucester	16 – 21	Wasps

Kingsholm

7 January 1995

Harlequins	15 – 15	Sale

The Stoop

7 January 1995

Northampton	18 – 20	Leicester

Franklin's Gardens

7 January 1995

Orrell	22 – 22	West Hartlepool

Edge Hall Road

=== Round 11 ===
14 January 1995

Bath	26 – 6	Northampton

Recreation Ground
Referee: David Leslie

14 January 1995

Leicester	29 – 19	Orrell

Welford Road

14 January 1995

Sale	21 – 9	Bristol

Heywood Road

14 January 1995

West Hartlepool	22 – 21	Gloucester

Brierton Lane

14 January 1995

Wasps	P – P	Harlequins

Repton Avenue

- Postponed. Game rescheduled to 21 January 1995.

=== Round 11 (rescheduled game) ===
21 January 1995

Wasps	25 – 7	Harlequins

Repton Avenue

- Game rescheduled from 14 January 1995.

=== Round 12 ===
11 February 1995

Gloucester	9 – 3	Leicester

Kingsholm

11 February 1995

Harlequins	9 – 10	Bristol

The Stoop

11 February 1995

Northampton	9 – 22	Sale

Franklin's Gardens

11 February 1995

Orrell	6 – 6	Bath

Edge Hall Road
Referee: Chris Rees

11 February 1995

Wasps	33 – 32	West Hartlepool

Repton Avenue

=== Round 13 ===
4 March 1995

Bristol	13 – 24	Northampton

Memorial Stadium

4 March 1995

Leicester	21 – 6	Wasps

Welford Road

4 March 1995

Sale	8 – 8	Orrell

Heywood Road

4 March 1995

West Hartlepool	10 – 8	Harlequins

Brierton Lane

4 March 1995

Bath	P – P	Gloucester

Recreation Ground

- Postponed. Game rescheduled to 4 May 1995.

=== Round 14 ===
25 March 1995

Gloucester	8 – 20	Sale

Kingsholm

25 March 1995

Harlequins	10 – 9	Northampton

The Stoop

25 March 1995

Orrell	20 – 16	Bristol

Edge Hall Road

25 March 1995

Wasps	11 – 10	Bath

Repton Avenue
Referee: John Pearson

25 March 1995

West Hartlepool	6 – 12	Leicester

Brierton Lane

=== Round 15 ===
8 April 1995

Bath	53 – 17	West Hartlepool

Recreation Ground
Referee: Ashley Rowden

8 April 1995

Bristol	21 – 17	Gloucester

Memorial Stadium

8 April 1995

Leicester	22 – 8	Harlequins

Welford Road

8 April 1995

Northampton	15 – 3	Orrell

Franklin's Gardens

8 April 1995

Sale	12 – 17	Wasps

Heywood Road

=== Round 16 ===
15 April 1995

Gloucester	14 – 13	Northampton

Kingsholm

15 April 1995

Leicester	31 – 21	Bath

Welford Road
Attendance: 14,000
Referee: Stuart Piercy

15 April 1995

Orrell	10 – 28	Harlequins

Edge Hall Road

15 April 1995

Wasps	27 – 15	Bristol

Repton Avenue

15 April 1995

West Hartlepool	23 – 17	Sale

Brierton Lane

=== Round 17 ===
22 April 1995

Bristol	12 – 17	West Hartlepool

Memorial Stadium

22 April 1995

Harlequins	19 – 25	Bath

The Stoop
Referee: Andy Leslie

22 April 1995

Northampton	19 – 13	Wasps

Franklin's Gardens

- Northampton are relegated.

22 April 1995

Orrell	43 – 14	Gloucester

Edge Hall Road

22 April 1995

Sale	10 – 20	Leicester

Welford Road

=== Round 18 ===
29 April 1995

Bath	13 – 18	Sale

Recreation Ground
Referee: Ed Morrison

29 April 1995

Gloucester	17 – 28	Harlequins

Kingsholm

29 April 1995

Leicester	17 – 3	Bristol

Welford Road

- Leicester are champions.

29 April 1995

Wasps	53 – 25	Orrell

Repton Avenue

29 April 1995

West Hartlepool	12 – 21	Northampton

Brierton Lane

=== Round 13 (rescheduled game) ===
4 May 1995

Bath	19 – 19	Gloucester

Recreation Ground

- Game rescheduled from 4 March 1995.

== See also ==
- 1994–95 National Division 2
- 1994–95 National Division 3
- 1994–95 National Division 4
- 1994–95 Courage League Division 5 North
- 1994–95 Courage League Division 5 South
