= 1994–95 National Division 2 =

Rugby union competition in England

- Countries: England
- Date: 10 September 1994 – 29 April 1995
- Champions: Saracens (2nd title)
- Runners-up: Wakefield
- Relegated: Fylde; Coventry
- Matches played: 90
- Top point scorer: 213 – Mike Johnson (Wakefield)
- Top try scorer: 8 – Tony Penn (Newcastle)

The 1994–95 National Division 2 (sponsored by Courage Brewery) was the eighth season of the second tier of the English rugby union league system, the Courage Clubs Championship, currently known as Champ Rugby. New teams to the division included London Irish and Newcastle Gosforth, relegated from tier 1, while Coventry and Fylde, were promoted from tier 3.

Saracens, the first team to be champions twice, were promoted to the 1995–96 National Division 1. There was no promotion for the runners–up Wakefield who finished in their highest league position. Coventry finished last and were relegated to the 1995–96 National Division 3 as were Fylde who finished one place above them. Both teams had been promoted in 1992–93.

== Structure ==
Each side played one another twice, in a round robin system, home and away, to make a total of eighteen matches for each team. The top side would be promoted to National Division 1 and the bottom two relegated to National Division 3.

== Participating teams ==
Locations of the 1994–95 National Division 2 teams

Team	Stadium	Capacity	City/Area	Previous season
Coventry	Coundon Road	10,000 (1,100 seats)	Coventry, West Midlands	Promoted from National 3 (1st)
Fylde	Woodlands	7,500 (500 seats)	Lytham St Annes, Lancashire	Promoted from National 3 (2nd)
London Irish	The Avenue	3,600 (600 seats)	Sunbury-on-Thames, Surrey	Relegated from National 1 (9th)
London Scottish	Athletic Ground	7,300 (1,300 seats)	Richmond, London	8th
Moseley	The Reddings	9,999 (1,800 seats)	Birmingham, West Midlands	5th
Newcastle Gosforth	Kingston Park	6,600	Newcastle upon Tyne, Tyne and Wear	Relegated from National 1 (10th)
Nottingham	Ireland Avenue	4,990 (590 seats)	Beeston, Nottinghamshire	6th
Saracens	Bramley Road	2,300 (300 seats)	Enfield, London	3rd
Wakefield	College Grove	4,000 (500 seats)	Wakefield, West Yorkshire	4th
Waterloo	St Anthony's Road	9,950 (950 seats)	Blundellsands, Merseyside	7th

== Table ==
1994–95 National Division 2 table
Pos	Team	Pld	W	D	L	PF	PA	PD	Pts	Qualification
1	Saracens	18	15	1	2	389	213	+176	31	Promoted
2	Wakefield	18	12	1	5	354	261	+93	25	
3	Newcastle Gosforth	18	8	2	8	373	281	+92	18	
4	London Scottish	18	9	0	9	351	321	+30	18	
5	London Irish	18	9	0	9	363	381	−18	18	
6	Moseley	18	8	1	9	299	303	−4	17	
7	Nottingham	18	8	1	9	299	322	−23	17	
8	Waterloo	18	8	0	10	287	331	−44	16	
9	Fylde	18	8	0	10	250	329	−79	16	Relegated
10	Coventry	18	2	0	16	213	436	−223	4	Relegated

Source: rugbyarchive.net
Rules for classification: Points are awarded as follows:
1. two points for a win
2. one point for a draw
3. no points for a loss

If teams are level at any stage, tiebreakers are applied in the following order:

1. difference between points for and against
2. total number of points for

== Fixtures & Results ==
=== Round 1 ===
10 September 1994

Coventry	14 – 15	Wakefield

Coundon Road

10 September 1994

Fylde	33 – 14	Nottingham

Woodlands Memorial Ground

10 September 1994

London Irish	25 – 13	London Scottish

The Avenue

10 September 1994

Moseley	9 – 11	Saracens

The Reddings

10 September 1994

Waterloo	18 – 13	Newcastle Gosforth

St Anthony's Road

=== Round 2 ===
17 September 1994

London Scottish	13 – 25	Waterloo

Athletic Ground

17 September 1994

Newcastle Gosforth	45 – 14	Fylde

Kingston Park

17 September 1994

Nottingham -	23 – 7	Coventry

Ireland Avenue

17 September 1994

Saracens	35 – 22	London Irish

Bramley Road

17 September 1994

Wakefield	17 – 22	Moseley

College Grove

=== Round 3 ===
24 September 1994

Coventry	19 – 15	Newcastle Gosforth

Coundon Road

24 September 1994

Fylde	10 – 31	London Scottish

Woodlands Memorial Ground

24 September 1994

Moseley	19 – 12	Nottingham

The Reddings

24 September 1994

Wakefield	17 – 8	Saracens

College Grove

24 September 1994

Waterloo	22 – 19	London Irish

St Anthony's Road

=== Round 4 ===
1 October 1994

London Irish	23 – 12	Fylde

The Avenue

1 October 1994

London Scottish	30 – 0	Coventry

Athletic Ground

1 October 1994

Newcastle Gosforth	37 – 10	Moseley

Kingston Park

1 October 1994

Nottingham	29 – 25	Wakefield

Ireland Avenue

1 October 1994

Saracens	27 – 5	Waterloo

Bramley Road

=== Round 5 ===
8 October 1994

Coventry	36 – 30	London Irish

Coundon Road

8 October 1994

Fylde	12 – 16	Waterloo

Woodlands Memorial Ground

8 October 1994

Moseley	24 – 15	London Scottish

The Reddings

8 October 1994

Nottingham	9 – 17	Saracens

Ireland Avenue

8 October 1994

Wakefield	9 – 21	Newcastle Gosforth

College Grove

=== Round 6 ===
15 October 1994

London Irish	47 – 19	Moseley

The Avenue

15 October 1994

London Scottish	24 – 21	Wakefield

Athletic Ground

15 October 1994

Newcastle Gosforth	27 – 6	Nottingham

Kingston Park

15 October 1994

Saracens	18 – 7	Fylde

Bramley Road

15 October 1994

Waterloo	26 – 5	Coventry

St Anthony's Road

=== Round 7 ===
22 October 1994

Coventry	17 – 21	Fylde

Coundon Road

22 October 1994

Moseley	9 – 25	Waterloo

The Reddings

22 October 1994

Newcastle Gosforth	11 – 17	Saracens

Kingston Park

22 October 1994

Nottingham	23 – 8	London Scottish

Ireland Avenue

22 October 1994

Wakefield	25 – 3	London Irish

College Grove

=== Round 8 ===
29 October 1994

Coventry	16 – 33	Saracens

Coundon Road

29 October 1994

Fylde	10 – 6	Moseley

Woodlands Memorial Ground

29 October 1994

London Irish	24 – 22	Nottingham

The Avenue

29 October 1994

London Scottish	24 – 13	Newcastle Gosforth

Athletic Ground

29 October 1994

Waterloo	18 – 19	Wakefield

St Anthony's Road

=== Round 9 ===
5 November 1994

Moseley	19 – 8	Coventry

The Reddings

5 November 1994

Newcastle Gosforth	9 – 15	London Irish

Kingston Park

5 November 1994

Nottingham	28 – 11	Waterloo

Ireland Avenue

5 November 1994

Saracens	27 – 17	London Scottish

Bramley Road

5 November 1994

Wakefield	24 – 13	Fylde

College Grove

=== Round 10 ===
7 January 1995

London Scottish	15 – 27	London Irish

Athletic Ground

7 January 1995

Newcastle Gosforth	33 – 16	Waterloo

Kingston Park

7 January 1995

Nottingham	9 – 10	Fylde

Ireland Avenue

7 January 1995

Saracens	17 – 15	Moseley

Bramley Road

7 January 1995

Wakefield	19 – 14	Coventry

College Grove

=== Round 11 ===
14 January 1995

Coventry	6 – 19	Nottingham

Coundon Road

14 January 1995

Fylde	6 – 12	Newcastle Gosforth

Woodlands Memorial Ground

14 January 1995

London Irish	6 – 16	Saracens

The Avenue

14 January 1995

Moseley	11 – 16	Wakefield

The Reddings

14 January 1995

Waterloo	17 – 9	London Scottish

St Anthony's Road

=== Round 12 ===
11 February 1995

London Irish	23 – 3	Waterloo

The Avenue

11 February 1995

London Scottish	28 – 3	Fylde

Athletic Ground

11 February 1995

Newcastle Gosforth	38 – 22	Coventry

Kingston Park

11 February 1995

Nottingham	9 – 9	Moseley

Ireland Avenue

11 February 1995

Saracens	10 – 3	Wakefield

Bramley Road

=== Round 13 ===
4 March 1995

Coventry	5 – 19	London Scottish

Coundon Road

4 March 1995

Fylde	27 – 12	London Irish

Woodlands Memorial Ground

4 March 1995

Moseley	P – P	Newcastle Gosforth

The Reddings

- Postponed. Game rescheduled to 18 March 1995.

4 March 1995

Wakefield	22 – 17	Nottingham

College Grove

4 March 1995

Waterloo	16 – 23	Saracens

St Anthony's Road

=== Round 13 (rescheduled game) ===
18 March 1995

Moseley	6 – 3	Newcastle Gosforth

The Reddings

- Game rescheduled from 4 March 1995.

=== Round 14 ===
25 March 1995

London Irish	25 – 8	Coventry

Ireland Avenue

25 March 1995

London Scottish	29 – 24	Moseley

Athletic Ground

25 March 1995

Newcastle Gosforth	15 – 15	Wakefield

Kingston Park

25 March 1995

Saracens	32 – 7	Nottingham

Bramley Road

25 March 1995

Waterloo	12 – 19	Fylde

St Anthony's Road

=== Round 17 (rescheduled game) ===
1 April 1995

Newcastle Gosforth	10 – 18	London Scottish

Kingston Park

- Game brought forward from 22 April 1995.

=== Round 15 ===
8 April 1995

Coventry	17 – 22	Waterloo

Coundon Road

8 April 1995

Fylde	15 – 37	Saracens

Woodlands Memorial Ground

8 April 1995

Moseley	42 – 16	London Irish

The Reddings

8 April 1995

Nottingham	18 – 33	Newcastle Gosforth

Ireland Avenue

8 April 1995

Wakefield	42 – 19	London Scottish

College Grove

=== Round 16 ===
15 April 1995

Fylde	22 – 8	Coventry

Woodlands Memorial Ground

15 April 1995

London Irish	3 – 33	Wakefield

The Avenue

15 April 1995

London Scottish	17 – 18	Nottingham

Athletic Ground

15 April 1995

Saracens	16 – 16	Newcastle Gosforth

Bramley Road

15 April 1995

Waterloo	12 – 27	Moseley

St Anthony's Road

=== Round 17 ===
22 April 1995

Moseley	6 – 8	Fylde

The Reddings

22 April 1995

Newcastle Gosforth	B – B	London Scottish

Kingston Park

- Game brought forward to 1 April 1995.

22 April 1995

Nottingham	22 – 11	London Irish

Ireland Avenue

22 April 1995

Saracens	38 – 0	Coventry

Bramley Road

22 April 1995

Wakefield	21 – 12	Waterloo

College Grove

=== Round 18 ===
29 April 1995

Coventry	11 – 22	Moseley

Coundon Road

29 April 1995

Fylde	8 – 11	Wakefield

Woodlands Memorial Ground

29 April 1995

London Irish	32 – 22	Newcastle Gosforth

The Avenue

29 April 1995

London Scottish	22 – 7	Saracens

Athletic Ground

29 April 1995

Waterloo	11 – 14	Nottingham

St Anthony's Road

== See also ==
- 1994–95 National Division 1
- 1994–95 National Division 3
- 1994–95 National Division 4
- 1994–95 Courage League Division 5 North
- 1994–95 Courage League Division 5 South
