= 1994–95 National Division 3 =

Rugby union competition in England

- Countries: England
- Champions: Bedford (1st title)
- Runners-up: Blackheath (also promoted)
- Relegated: Clifton, Exeter
- Matches played: 90

The 1994–95 National Division 3 (sponsored by Courage Brewery) was the eighth season of the third tier of the English rugby union league system, the Courage Clubs Championship, currently known as National League 1. New teams to the division included Otley and Rugby (relegated from tier 1) and Clifton and Harrogate (promoted from tier 4).

Bedford finished in first place and are promoted to the 1995–96 National Division 2 for next season and they are joined by the runner-up, Blackheath; the teams finished 3rd and 4th respectively last season. Following their promotion last season Clifton finished 9th and are relegated to the 1995–96 National Division 4 along with the last-placed team Exeter.

== Structure ==
Each side played one another twice, in a round robin system, home and away, to make a total of eighteen matches for each team. The top two sides would be promoted to National Division 2 and the bottom two relegated to National Division 4.

== Participating teams and locations ==
1994–95 National Division 3 teams in England

Team	Stadium	Capacity	City/Area	Previous season
Bedford	Goldington Road	4,800 (800 seats)	Bedford, Bedfordshire	3rd
Blackheath	Rectory Field	3,500 (500 seats)	Greenwich, London	4th
Clifton	Station Road	2,200 (200 seats)	Cribbs Causeway, Henbury, Bristol	Promoted from National 4 (1st)
Exeter	County Ground	5,750 (750 seats)	Exeter, Devon	6th
Harrogate	Claro Road	4,500 (500 seats)	Harrogate, North Yorkshire	Promoted from National 4 (2nd)
Morley	Scatcherd Lane	6,000 (1,000 seats)	Morley, Leeds, West Yorkshire	8th
Otley	Cross Green	7,000 (852 seats)	Otley, West Yorkshire	Relegated from National 2 (10th)
Richmond	Athletic Ground	7,300 (1,300 seats)	Richmond, London	7th
Rosslyn Park	The Rock	4,630 (630 seats)	Roehampton, London	5th
Rugby	Webb Ellis Road	3,200 (200 seats)	Rugby, Warwickshire	Relegated from National 2 (9th)

== League table ==
1994–95 National Division 3 table
Pos	Team	Pld	W	D	L	PF	PA	PD	Pts	Qualification
1	Bedford (C)	18	13	1	4	421	238	+183	27	Promoted
2	Blackheath	18	12	2	4	299	190	+109	26	Promoted
3	Rugby	18	11	0	7	333	271	+62	22	
4	Rosslyn Park	18	10	0	8	313	280	+33	20	
5	Morley	18	9	2	7	277	326	−49	20	
6	Otley	18	9	0	9	278	248	+30	18	
7	Harrogate	18	7	2	9	275	404	−129	16	
8	Richmond	18	6	1	11	319	290	+29	13	
9	Clifton	18	5	1	12	242	344	−102	11	Relegated
10	Exeter	18	3	1	14	153	319	−166	7	Relegated

Rules for classification: Points are awarded as follows: 2 pts for a win, 1 pt for a draw, 0 pts for a loss. If teams are level at any stage, the following tiebreaker is applied: Difference between points for and against.
(C) Champions

== See also ==
- 1994–95 National Division 1
- 1994–95 National Division 2
- 1994–95 National Division 4
- 1994–95 Courage League Division 5 North
- 1994–95 Courage League Division 5 South
