= Richmond F.C. =

English rugby union club, based in London

(England) Richmond Rugby
- Full name: Richmond Rugby Club
- Union: Surrey RFU
- Founded: 1861; 165 years ago
- Location: Richmond, London, England
- Ground: Athletic Ground, Richmond (Capacity: 4,500 (1,000 seated))
- Chairman: Nick Preston
- President: James Foster
- Coach: Rob Powell
- Captain: Luc Jones
- League: Champ Rugby
- 2025–26: 12th of 14
Team kit

Official website
- richmondfc.co.uk

Richmond Rugby Club is a rugby union club in Richmond, London, England. It is a founding member of the Rugby Football Union, and is one of the oldest football clubs (of any code). It fields teams in both men's and women's rugby; the men's first team currently play in Champ Rugby in the 2nd tier of the English rugby union system, following their promotion from the 2024–25 National League 1, while the women's first team play in the Women's Championship.

== History ==
=== Early history ===
Formed in 1861, it is one of the oldest football clubs in the world and holds a significant place in the history of association football, playing in the first ever match under the rules of The Football Association on 19 December 1863, against the Barnes Club, even though it was not a member of the Football Association. In 1878 Richmond hosted the first ever floodlit match and in 1909 played in the inaugural match at Twickenham Stadium, the home of English rugby.

=== Professional era ===
In 1996, the then third division club was bought by financial markets trader and Monaco tax exile Ashley Levett. Levett turned the club into the first professional team in England, and began buying in big names to push the club up the leagues, including Ben Clarke from Bath, the first £1million signing. The club outgrew the Richmond Athletic Ground and became tenants at the Madejski Stadium in Reading. But the crowds and revenues from competition meant that Levett was continually financing the club, and so he placed it in administration in March 1999.

The professional Richmond club and professional London Scottish F.C. were both merged into London Irish, who moved to the Stoop Memorial Ground before taking up tenancy at Madejski the following year. This period of hesitancy and uncertainty resulted in many of the professional players leaving the club pre-merger, and returning to their original home-teams. The amateur club was reformed in 2000, and the club rejoined the leagues as an amateur club at the bottom of the pyramid.

=== Post administration ===
After the professional era, hooker Andy Cuthbert remained at the club and captained the side for several years. Despite its lowly league position, Richmond has still managed to attract some top class players - former South Africa captain Bobby Skinstad joined for the 2005–06 season, Chilean fly-half Sebastian Berti joined in 2006 and England Students' wing Joe Ajuwa was a regular starter in the 1st XV. Under head coach Andy Maren the club climbed through the lower ranks of the England rugby divisions, from Herts & Middlesex 1 (ninth level) to London 1 (fifth level) in four years, amassing a perfect record of 83 straight wins in league play in the process. However, the club seemingly stalled at that level, continuing to put together winning seasons, but failing to gain promotion in 2005–06 and 2006–07.

In the 2007–08 season, Richmond laid out a serious plan for promotion - something they had failed to achieve in the past two seasons, one reason being they had not had any semi-professional players on their books. For the 2007–08 season, the club recruited a number of semi-professional players to boost Richmond's promotion chances. One of these players was USA international Jon Hartman. Richmond eventually achieved promotion, winning all but one of their League games. The coach, Brett Taylor, laid out plans for the club to be in National League 2 South in two seasons, and attempts were made to structure the colts teams into an effective feeder system for the 1st XV. However, during summer 2008, London Scottish were boosted financially and subsequently signed Taylor as their head coach. Richmond appointed Geoff Richards to take his place. Following two years in National League Two, Geoff Richards decided not to renew his contract citing differences in opinion between the board and himself on how the club should move forward. In 2009–10 Richmond appointed Oxford University Director of Rugby Steve Hill to take over after fourteen years in charge of the university side. Within two years (summer 2011) promotion was achieved and Richmond played in National League 1 until the end of the 2015–16 season when they achieved a further promotion into the Greene King IPA Championship. Following three seasons in the Championship, Richmond were relegated at the end of the 2018–19 season and forced to return to National League 1. They hit back strongly in season 2019–20, winning 20 out of 25 matches in National League 1 to finish top of the league and earn promotion back to the Championship.

== Shirt numbering ==
Richmond always traditionally played without a number 13 (similar to Bath) – the outside centre would wear 14, right wing 15 and fullback 16. However, during the professional era they adopted squad numbering; meaning rather than rugby's usual method of giving numbers 1–15 to the starting line-up, players were assigned a number for the season, as seen in football. Back in the amateur leagues, Richmond returned to their traditional numbering system before promotion to the National Leagues in 2008 saw them forced to adopt the uniform 1–15 numbering system according to RFU laws.

== Current standings ==
2026–27 Champ Rugby table
Pos	Team	Pld	W	D	L	PF	PA	PD	TF	TA	TB	LB	Pts	Qualification
1	Worcester Warriors	6	6	0	0	277	114	+163	42	17	4	0	28	Play-off semi-finals
2	Ealing Trailfinders	6	5	0	1	287	135	+152	45	20	5	1	26	Play-off semi-finals
3	Coventry	6	5	0	1	278	188	+90	41	29	2	1	23	Play-off quarter-finals
4	Cornish Pirates	6	4	0	2	222	208	+14	33	31	3	0	19	Play-off quarter-finals
5	Chinnor	6	4	0	2	201	200	+1	31	31	1	0	17	Play-off quarter-finals
6	Rotherham Titans	6	4	0	2	181	231	−50	28	35	1	0	17	Play-off quarter-finals
7	Ampthill	6	4	0	2	210	228	−18	32	34	0	0	16	
8	Bedford Blues	6	3	0	3	188	179	+9	29	27	3	1	16	
9	Doncaster Knights	6	2	0	4	187	197	−10	28	28	1	2	11	
10	Caldy	6	1	0	5	203	239	−36	31	36	0	3	7	
11	Blackheath	6	1	0	5	165	220	−55	23	32	0	3	7	
12	Nottingham	6	1	0	5	145	227	−82	22	35	0	2	6	Relegation play-off
13	Richmond	6	1	0	5	158	221	−63	24	35	0	1	5	Relegation play-off
14	Hartpury	6	1	0	5	137	252	−115	24	35	0	1	5	Relegated

Updated to match(es) played on 1 November 2026. Source:
Rules for classification: If teams are level at any stage, tiebreakers are applied in the following order:
1. Number of matches won
2. Number of matches drawn
3. Difference between points for and against
4. Total number of points for
5. Aggregate number of points scored in matches between tied teams
6. Number of matches won excluding the first match, then the second and so on until the tie is settled

== Youth ==
Richmond's youth section is also highly successful - London Irish fullback Delon Armitage was a member of the mini section, and London Wasps' centre Dominic Waldouck earned an England callup for the 2008 tour of New Zealand, having progressed through the agegroups at Richmond. London Wasps No.8 Hugo Ellis, another product of Richmond's youth section, captained Wales U16s, as well as England at U19 and was the England U20 Captain in the 2008 Grand Slam winning side, also reaching the finals of the iRB Junior World Championship. Yet another former Richmond Youth, Joe Simpson, winning his first full England cap in 2011 Rugby World Cup, also of London Wasps, was scrum half for the U20s. Simpson was in the England Sevens squad for the first round of the 2007–08 IRB Sevens World Series; Sevens being an important stepping stone for the development of the best youth talent.

In the 2009–10 season a colts team was revived based on the highly rated U17 age group team of the previous season, and several U19 players returning to further bolster the squad. They entered the National Colts Cup and having defeated eight opponents most notably Blackheath, they beat former champions Old Northamptonians, 25–12 at Franklin's Gardens.

== Home ground ==
Richmond play at the Athletic Ground, Richmond, which borders Royal Mid Surrey Golf Club, and is close to other sporting facilities such as Richmond Swimming Pool, Old Deer Park and also a gym. The complex includes two pitches (pitches 3 & 4) by the front gate, the 1st team pitch and perpendicular to that, pitch 2. The site also has a disused driving range behind the 1st team pitch which has three pitches on it, and a disused bowls club. One side of the pitch has a large concrete all-seater stand, under which are the changing rooms, a canteen, shop, physio room and two bars. Also on this southern side of the pitch is a disused cricket pavilion which also contains several more changing rooms and showers. During the early professional years, a temporary stand was erected along the north side of the pitch.

Later on in the professional era, Richmond 1st team moved to the Madejski Stadium, Reading, where they played until bankruptcy. The stadium would later become London Irish's home ground, and was an early example of London rugby clubs playing in football grounds – London Wasps played at Loftus Road before moving to Adams Park, and Saracens moved to Vicarage Road.

== Rivalries ==
Richmond contested the first ever rugby match with Blackheath F.C., and the clubs have continued to play an annual fixture to uphold the tradition – now referred to as the longest-running annual fixture in rugby. As of 2013–14, the two clubs are in the same league, after many years apart, meaning that they play each other at least twice during the regular season, in addition to the traditional pre-season fixture.

Richmond shared the Athletic Ground with London Scottish, and this rivalry is very intense. Both sides experienced a high point at the beginning of the professional era and played in the Premiership. Both teams also fell into administration and dropped down to a level well below the national leagues, and though the routes taken have been slightly different, both clubs have battled their way up the leagues. As of 2019–20, London Scottish were also in the Championship. In years when the clubs are in the same division, the two "home" and "away" matches are two of the most well-attended and hotly contested of the year.

Richmond also have a local rivalry with Barnes who they have recently frequently played as both sides sought to move into the national leagues.

At youth level, Richmond's strongest rivalry tends to be with nearby Rosslyn Park. A Richmond vs Rosslyn Park game is always surrounded by controversy of some sort, which is the same for just about any team that plays against Rosslyn Park.

== Influence ==
In 1876, the Wallaroo FC in Sydney—the first football club in Australia to follow rugby rules—adopted Richmond's tricolour jersey and colours. The club's 1871 rules appear to have been modeled on those of Richmond prior to the founding of the Rugby Football Union. Wallaroo player Charles Wade, who also represented Oxford and England, turned out for Richmond between 1884 and 1886 under the captaincy of Edward Temple Gurdon.

== Honours ==
- Middlesex Sevens titles: (9)
  - 1951, 1953, 1955, 1974, 1975, 1977, 1979, 1980, 1983
- National League 1 champions: (4)
  - 1991–92, 2015–16, 2019–20, 2024–25
- Courage League National Division Two champions:
  - 1996–97
- Herts/Middlesex 1 champions:
  - 2000–01
- Surrey Cup titles: (6)
  - 2001, 2002, 2003, 2004, 2006, 2007
- London Division 4 South West champions:
  - 2001–02
- London Division 3 South West champions:
  - 2002–03
- London Division 2 South champions:
  - 2003–04
- London Division 1 champions:
  - 2007–08
- National League 2 (north v south) promotion play-off winners:
  - 2011–12
- Gala Sevens
  - Champions (1): 1984

== Current squad ==
The Richmond squad for the 2025–26 season are:

Richmond 2025–26 Champ Rugby squad
**Props**: (Wales) Theo Bevacqua; (England) Seb Brownhill; (England) Chris Freeman; (England) Jimmy Litchfield; (England) Hamish Murray; (England) Luke Spring; (England) Barnaby Vaughan; **Hookers**: (England) Will Goffey; (England) Harry Hocking; (Hong Kong) **Alex Post**; (England) Callum Torpey; **Locks**: (England) Alex Ashton; (England) Dan Frost; (England) Cameron Gray; (England) Jake Monson; (England) George Nugent; (England) Dan Ormerod; (England) Aron Suggate	**Back row**: (England) Ethan Benson; (Ireland) Donnacha Byrne; (England) Jared Cardew; (England) Xavier Hastings; (Ireland) Sam Pim; (England) Miles Wakeling; (England) Henry Wills; **Scrum-halves**: (England) Freddie Charles; (Wales) Luc Jones; (England) Matthew Marsh; (Wales) Alex Schwarz; (England) Brodie Young; **Fly-halves**: (South Africa) Jason Baggott; (England) Alex Burrage; (England) Lewis Dennett; (England) Tom Hamble; (England) Tom Smith	**Centres**: (England) Paddy Case; (Ireland) Sam Dardis; (England) James Langston; (England) Chidera Obonna; (New Zealand) Tololima Savaiiaea; **Wings**: (England) Josh Addams; (Hong Kong) **Paul Altier**; (England) Conrad Burne; (England) Alex O'Meara; (South Africa) ROnnie du Randt; (England) Sam Smith; **Fullbacks**: (England) Archie Brosch; (England) Callum Grieve; (England) Greg Kitson; (South Africa) Werner Nel
**(c)** denotes the team captain. (vc) denotes vice-captain. **Bold** denotes internationally capped players.^{ST} denotes a short-term signing. Source:

== Notable former players ==
See also Category:Richmond F.C. players

- England - Frank Reginald Adams
- England - Harry Alexander
- Wales - Allan Bateman
- South Africa - Tommy Bedford
- Wales - Norman Biggs
- England - Spencer Brown
- England - Tony Bucknall
- Romania - Daniel Carpo
- England - Ernest Cheston
- England - Ben Clarke
- Ireland - Thomas Crean
- Wales - Arthur "Monkey" Gould
- Wales - Bob Gould
- England - Charles Gurdon
- England - Edward Temple Gurdon
- England - Ben Harvey
- England - Jeremy Janion
- Scotland - Peter Kininmonth
- England - Henry Lawrence
- England - Dan Luger
- Argentina - Rolando Martín
- England - Brian Moore
- United States - Boyd Morrison
- England - Richard Parker
- Argentina - Agustín Pichot
- England - Nick Preston
- Wales - Craig Quinnell
- Wales - Scott Quinnell
- England - Chris Ralston
- England - Alan Rotherham (IRB Hall of Fame inductee)
- South Africa - Bobby Skinstad
- England - Dyne Fenton Smith, also part of the first official British Isles team that toured South Africa in 1910
- England - Dawson Turner - the only man to play in the first five rugby internationals
- Samoa - Earl Va'a
- Wales - Barry Williams
- England - Jeff Probyn

== List of seasons (since the beginning of professional era) ==
Season	Division	Level	League record									Promotion play-off
Season	Division	Level	P	W	D	L	F	A	BP	Pts	Pos	Promotion play-off
1987–88	National Division 2	2	11	6	0	5	140	156	-	29	6th	
1988–89	National Division 2	2	11	4	1	6	112	216	-	9	9th	
1989–90	National Division 2	2	11	7	1	3	282	135	-	15	3rd	
1990–91	National Division 2	2	12	3	1	8	134	245	-	7	12th	
1991–92	National Division 3	3	12	10	1	1	296	124	-	21	1st	
1992–93	National Division 2	2	13	5	0	8	202	196	-	10	10th	
1993–94	National Division 3	3	18	9	0	9	337	300	-	18	7th	
1994–95	National Division 3	3	18	6	1	11	319	290	-	13	8th	
1995–96	National Division 3	3	18	13	1	4	476	266	-	27	2nd	
1996–97	National Division 2	2	22	19	2	1	986	410	-	40	1st	
1997–98	English Premiership	1	22	12	0	10	607	499	-	24	5th	
1998–99	English Premiership	1	26	11	2	13	720	715	-	24	9th	Entered administration
1999–2000	Did not compete - reformed as an amateur side at Level 9											
2000–01	Herts/Middlesex 1	9	18	17	0	1	816	72	-	34	1st	
2001–02	London 4 South West	8	22	22	0	0	1,142	115	-	44	1st	
2002–03	London 3 South West	7	18	18	0	0	885	113	-	36	1st	
2003–04	London 2 South	6	22	22	0	0	991	155	-	44	1st	
2004–05	London 1	5	22	16	0	6	616	291	-	32	3rd	
2005–06	London 1	5	22	19	0	3	850	337	-	38	2nd	
2006–07	London 1	5	22	14	0	8	756	418	-	28	4th	
2007–08	London 1	5	22	21	0	1	870	180	-	42	1st	
2008–09	National Division 3 South	4	26	15	2	9	566	510	10	74	4th	
2009–10	National League 2 South	4	28	11	0	17	706	761	18	62	8th	
2010–11	National League 2 South	4	30	24	0	6	1,125	526	21	117	3rd	
2011–12	National League 2 South	4	30	23	2	5	927	488	22	118	2nd	Richmond 20-13 Caldy (a.e.t.)
2012–13	National League 1	3	30	13	4	13	730	732	16	76	8th	
2013–14	National League 1	3	30	14	1	15	761	699	22	80	7th	
2014–15	National League 1	3	30	14	2	14	837	866	20	80	7th	
2015–16	National League 1	3	30	23	2	5	854	534	19	116	1st	
2016–17	RFU Championship	2	20	5	0	15	347	585	6	26	10th	
2017–18	RFU Championship	2	22	9	0	13	444	597	10	46	9th	
2018–19	RFU Championship	2	22	6	0	16	430	604	9	33	12th	
2019–20	National League 1	3	25	20	0	5	741	347	19	97	1st	Season curtailed due to COVID-19 pandemic
2020–21	RFU Championship	2	10	1	0	9	138	366	0	4	11th	Truncated season due to COVID-19 pandemic
2021–22	RFU Championship	2	20	7	1	12	440	546	12	42	9th	
2022–23	RFU Championship	2	22	3	1	18	413	762	9	21	12th	
Total			737	442	25	270	20,996	14,156	213	1,527		

== See also ==
- Richmond Women
- Rugby union in London
