= 1992–93 National Division 1 =

Rugby union competition in England

- Countries: England
- Date: 19 September 1992 – 24 April 1993
- Champions: Bath (4th title)
- Runners-up: Wasps
- Relegated: London Scottish; Saracens; West Hartlepool; Rugby Lions
- Matches played: 78
- Top point scorer: 122 – Jonathan Webb (Bath)
- Top try scorer: 7 – Stuart Barnes (Bath)

The 1992–93 National Division 1 (sponsored by Courage Brewery) was the sixth season of the top tier of the English rugby union league system, the Courage Clubs Championship, currently known as Premiership Rugby. Bath were the defending champions while new teams included the promoted sides, London Scottish and West Hartlepool.

Bath were the champions for the third year running (and fourth overall), beating Wasps on points difference on the very last day of the season after both sides won their final fixtures. Four clubs were relegated to the 1993–94 National Division 2; London Scottish, Saracens, West Hartlepool and Rugby Lions.

== Structure ==
Each side playing the others once to make a total of twelve matches each. Restructuring at the end of the season for the league from thirteen to ten teams, meant that the bottom four sides would be relegated to National Division 2.

== Participating teams ==
Locations of the 1992–93 Courage League National Division One teams
1992–93 Greater London Courage League National Division One teams

Team	Stadium	Capacity	City/Area	Previous season
Bath	Recreation Ground	8,300 (1,000 seats)	Bath, Somerset	Champions
Bristol	Memorial Stadium	8,500 (1,200 seats)	Bristol, Avon	10th
Gloucester	Kingsholm	12,000 (Note: Kingsholm capacity up from 11,100 to 12,000 in 1992–93, which was achieved against Bath on 15 February 1993.)	Gloucester, Gloucestershire	4th
Harlequins	The Stoop	9,000 (2,000 seats)	Twickenham, London	8th
Leicester	Welford Road	14,700 (9,200 seats)	Leicester, Leicestershire	6th
London Irish	The Avenue	3,600 (600 seats)	Sunbury-on-Thames, Surrey	9th
London Scottish	Athletic Ground	7,300 (1,300 seats)	Richmond, London	Promoted from National 2 (1st)
Northampton	Franklin's Gardens	6,000 (2,000 seats)	Northampton, Northamptonshire	3rd
Orrell	Edge Hall Road	5,300 (300 seats)	Orrell, Greater Manchester	2nd
Rugby Lions	Webb Ellis Road	3,200 (200 seats)	Rugby, Warwickshire	11th
Saracens	Bramley Road	2,300 (300 seats)	Enfield, London	5th
Wasps	Repton Avenue	3,200 (1,200 seats)	Sudbury, London	7th
West Hartlepool	Brierton Lane	7,000	Hartlepool, County Durham	Promoted from National 2 (2nd)

== Table ==
Pos	Team	Pld	W	D	L	PF	PA	PD	Pts
1	Bath (C)	12	11	0	1	355	97	+258	22
2	Wasps	12	11	0	1	186	118	+68	22
3	Leicester	12	9	0	3	220	116	+104	18
4	Northampton	12	8	0	4	215	150	+65	16
5	Gloucester	12	6	0	6	173	151	+22	12
6	Bristol	12	6	0	6	148	169	−21	12
7	London Irish	12	6	0	6	175	223	−48	12
8	Harlequins	12	5	1	6	197	187	+10	11
9	Orrell	12	5	0	7	175	183	−8	10
10	London Scottish (R)	12	3	1	8	192	248	−56	7
11	Saracens (R)	12	3	0	9	137	180	−43	6
12	West Hartlepool (R)	12	3	0	9	149	236	−87	6
13	Rugby Lions (R)	12	1	0	11	104	368	−264	2

(C) Champions; (R) Relegated

== Results ==
The home team is listed in the left column

Home \ Away	BAT	BRI	GLO	HAR	LEI	LOI	LOS	NOR	ORR	RLI	SAR	WAS	WHA
Bath Rugby				22–6		42–19	40–6		39–3	61–7		22–11	
Bristol	8–31		9–22		15–10				23–11		12–7		19–11
Gloucester RFC	0–20			25–5					8–13	21–12	19–5		6–21
Harlequins		16–0				47–24	22–22	7–12		35–14		13–15	
Leicester	3–13		22–21	23–0					9–0		30–3		21–8
London Irish		9–7	6–18		14–30			12–3			10–9		25–13
London Scottish		8–11	8–3		11–18	28–21		21–34					10–15
Northampton	11–8	16–6	16–21		12–13						21–17		55–9
Orrell				18–16		8–12	13–10	9–10		66–0		10–11	
Rugby Lions		21–32			5–28	0–14	20–45	7–13				3–34	
Saracens	13–19			3–18			41–17		6–9	14–9		9–13	
Wasps		7–6	14–9		14–13	18–9	10–6	20–12					
West Hartlepool	10–38			9–12					39–15	5–6	3–10	6–19	

Legend: Blue = home team win; Yellow = draw; Red = away team win.

== Fixtures & Results ==
=== Round 1 ===
19 September 1992

Bath	22 – 6	Harlequins
	Report

Recreation Ground
Attendance: 7,000
Referee: Brian Campsall

19 September 1992

London Irish	14 – 30	Leicester

The Avenue

19 September 1992

London Scottish	8 – 3	Gloucester
	Report

Athletic Ground
Referee: Stuart Piercy

19 September 1992

Northampton	16 – 6	Bristol
	Report

Franklin's Gardens
Referee: C Rees

19 September 1992

Saracens	14 – 9	Rugby Lions

Bramley Road

19 September 1992

West Hartlepool	6 – 19	Wasps
	Report

Brierton Lane
Referee: T Spreadbury

Bye/s: Orrell

=== Round 2 ===
26 September 1992

Bath	42 – 19	London Irish

Recreation Ground
Referee: Brian Wallis

26 September 1992

Bristol	19 – 11	West Hartlepool

Memorial Stadium

26 September 1992

Harlequins	13 – 15	Wasps
	Report

The Stoop
Referee: F Howard

26 September 1992

Leicester	22 – 21	Gloucester
	Report

Welford Road
Referee: D Matthews

26 September 1992

Northampton	21 – 17	Saracens

Franklin's Gardens

26 September 1992

Orrell	13 – 10	London Scottish
	Report

Edge Hall Road
Referee: N Lasaga

Bye/s: Rugby Lions

=== Round 3 ===
3 October 1992

Gloucester	21 – 12	Rugby Lions

Kingsholm

3 October 1992

London Irish	12 – 3	Northampton
	Report

The Avenue
Referee: Brian Campsall

3 October 1992

London Scottish	8 – 11	Bristol

Athletic Ground

3 October 1992

Saracens	6 – 9	Orrell
	Report

Bramley Road
Referee: A Spreadbury

3 October 1992

Wasps	14 – 13	Leicester
	Report

Repton Avenue
Referee: A Reay

3 October 1992

West Hartlepool	9 – 12	Harlequins

Brierton Lane

Bye/s: Bath

=== Round 4 ===
10 October 1992

Bristol	12 – 7	Saracens

Memorial Stadium

10 October 1992

Harlequins	22 – 22	London Scottish

The Stoop

10 October 1992

Leicester	21 – 8	West Hartlepool

Welford Road

10 October 1992

Northampton	11 – 8	Bath

Franklin's Gardens
Attendance: 6,000
Referee: Fred Howard

10 October 1992

Orrell	8 – 12	London Irish

Edge Hall Road

10 October 1992

Rugby Lions	3 – 34	Wasps
	Report

Webb Ellis Road
Referee: C Henderson

Bye/s: Gloucester

=== Round 5 ===
24 October 1992

Bath	39 – 3	Orrell

Recreation Ground
Attendance: 6,000
Referee: Stuart Piercey

24 October 1992

London Irish	9 – 7	Bristol

The Avenue

24 October 1992

London Scottish	11 – 18	Leicester

Athletic Ground

24 October 1992

Saracens	3 – 18	Harlequins

Bramley Road

24 October 1992

Wasps	14 – 9	Gloucester

Repton Avenue

24 October 1992

West Hartlepool	5 – 6	Rugby Lions

Brierton Lane

Bye/s: Northampton

=== Round 6 ===
31 October 1992

Bristol	8 – 31	Bath

Memorial Stadium
Attendance: 10,000
Referee: Steve Lander

31 October 1992

Gloucester	6 – 21	West Hartlepool

Kingsholm

31 October 1992

Harlequins	47 – 24	London Irish

The Stoop

31 October 1992

Leicester	30 – 3	Saracens

Welford Road

31 October 1992

Orrell	9 – 10	Northampton

Edge Hall Road

31 October 1992

Rugby Lions	20 – 45	London Scottish

Webb Ellis Road

Bye/s: Wasps

=== Round 7 ===
21 November 1992

Bristol	23 – 11	Orrell

Memorial Stadium

21 November 1992

Gloucester	19 – 5	Saracens

Kingsholm

21 November 1992

Harlequins	7 – 12	Northampton

The Stoop

21 November 1992

Leicester	3 – 13	Bath

Welford Road
Attendance: 10,000
Referee: Chris Lewis

21 November 1992

Rugby Lions	0 – 14	London Irish

Webb Ellis Road

21 November 1992

Wasps	10 – 6	London Scottish

Repton Avenue

Bye/s: West Hartlepool

=== Round 8 ===
9 January 1993

Bath	61 – 7	Rugby Lions

Recreation Ground
Referee: Geraint Davies

9 January 1993

London Irish	6 – 18	Gloucester
	Report

The Avenue
Referee: D Matthews

9 January 1993

London Scottish	10 – 15	West Hartlepool

Athletic Ground

9 January 1993

Northampton	12 – 13	Leicester
	Report

Franklin's Gardens
Referee: Ed Morrison

9 January 1993

Orrell	18 – 16	Harlequins

Edge Hall Road

9 January 1993

Saracens	9 – 13	Wasps
	Report

Bramley Road
Referee: D Sainsbury

Bye/s: Bristol

=== Round 9 ===
13 February 1993

Gloucester	0 – 20	Bath
	Report

Kingsholm
Attendance: 12,000
Referee: Ed Morrison

13 February 1993

Harlequins	16 – 0	Bristol

The Stoop

13 February 1993

Leicester	9 – 0	Orrell
	Report

Welford Road
Referee: A Spreadbury

13 February 1993

Rugby Lions	7 – 13	Northampton

Webb Ellis Road

13 February 1993

Wasps	18 – 9	London Irish
	Report

Repton Avenue
Referee: C Rees

13 February 1993

West Hartlepool	3 – 10	Saracens
	Report

Brierton Lane
Referee: S Piercy

Bye/s: London Scottish

=== Round 10 ===
13 March 1993

Bath	22 – 11	Wasps

Recreation Ground
Attendance: 8,500
Referee: David Matthews

13 March 1993

Bristol	15 – 10	Leicester

Memorial Stadium

13 March 1993

London Irish	25 – 13	West Hartlepool

The Avenue

13 March 1993

Northampton	16 – 21	Gloucester

Franklin's Gardens

13 March 1993

Orrell	66 – 0	Rugby Lions

Edge Hall Road

13 March 1993

Saracens	41 – 17	London Scottish

Bramley Road

Bye/s: Harlequins

=== Round 11 ===
27 March 1993

Gloucester	8 – 13	Orrell

Kingsholm

27 March 1993

Leicester	23 – 0	Harlequins

Welford Road

27 March 1993

London Scottish	28 – 21	London Irish

Athletic Ground

27 March 1993

Rugby Lions	21 – 32	Bristol

Webb Ellis Road

- Rugby Lions are relegated.

27 March 1993

Wasps	20 – 12	Northampton

Repton Avenue

27 March 1993

West Hartlepool	10 – 38	Bath

Brierton Lane
Referee: David Leslie

Bye/s: Saracens

=== Round 12 ===
3 April 1993

Bath	40 – 6	London Scottish

Recreation Ground
Attendance: 6,000
Referee: Tony Sparkes

- London Scottish are relegated.

3 April 1993

Bristol	9 – 22	Gloucester

Memorial Stadium

3 April 1993

Harlequins	35 – 14	Rugby Lions

The Stoop

3 April 1993

London Irish	10 – 9	Saracens

The Avenue

- Saracens are relegated.

3 April 1993

Northampton	55 – 9	West Hartlepool

Franklin's Gardens

- West Hartlepool are relegated.

3 April 1993

Orrell	10 – 11	Wasps

Edge Hall Road

Bye/s: Leicester

=== Round 13 ===
24 April 1993

Gloucester	25 – 5	Harlequins

Kingsholm

24 April 1993

London Scottish	21 – 34	Northampton

Athletic Ground

24 April 1993

Rugby Lions	5 – 28	Leicester

Webb Ellis Road

24 April 1993

Saracens	13 – 19	Bath

Bramley Road
Referee: Fred Howard

- Bath are champions.

24 April 1993

Wasps	7 – 6	Bristol

Repton Avenue

24 April 1993

West Hartlepool	39 – 15	Orrell

Brierton Lane

Bye/s: London Irish

== See also ==
- 1992–93 National Division 2
- 1992–93 National Division 3
- 1992–93 National Division 4 North
- 1992–93 National Division 4 South
