= 1992–93 National Division 4 North =

Rugby union competition in England

- Countries: England
- Champions: Harrogate (1st title)
- Runners-up: Rotherham (not promoted)
- Relegated: 12 teams (Note: The re-organization of the English league system by the RFU meant that all teams other than the champions would be relegated to the new look National Division 5 North for the 1993–94 season.)
- Matches played: 110

The 1992–93 National Division 4 North was the sixth full season of rugby union within the fourth tier of the English league system, currently known as National League 2 North, and counterpart to the National Division 4 South (now National League 2 South).

Impending changes to the league structure by the RFU meant that several new leagues were to be introduced at the end of the season. This meant that champions Harrogate were promoted into the 1993–94 National Division 4, clubs ranked 2nd to 11th dropped to the 1993–94 National Division 5 North and bottom club Towcestrians two levels to Midlands 1. Relegation was particularly tough on newly promoted Rotherham as they finished level with Harrogate only to lose out to their Yorkshire rivals by virtue of a worse for/against record.

== Structure ==
Each team played one match against each of the other teams, playing a total of twelve matches each. Changes to the league structure by the RFU for the 1993–94 season meant that the champions are promoted to National Division 4, clubs ranked 2nd to 11th went into National Division 5 North and the bottom side down to either Midlands 1 or North 1 depending on locality.

== Participating teams and locations ==
Locations of the 1992–93 National Division 4 North teams

Team	Ground	Capacity	City/Area	Previous Season
Durham City	Hollow Drift	3,000 (500 seats)	Durham, County Durham	10th
Harrogate	Claro Road	4,500 (500 seats)	Harrogate, North Yorkshire	7th
Hereford	Wyeside	3,200 (200 seats)	Hereford, Herefordshire	Runners up (not promoted)
Kendal	Mint Bridge	4,600 (600 seats)	Kendal, Cumbria	3rd
Lichfield	Cooke Fields	5,460 (460 seats)	Lichfield, Staffordshire	5th
Nuneaton	Harry Cleaver Ground	5,000 (650 seats)	Nuneaton, Warwickshire	Relegated from National 3 (12th)
Preston Grasshoppers	Lightfoot Green	2,250 (250 seats)	Preston, Lancashire	4th
Rotherham	Clifton Lane	2,500	Rotherham, South Yorkshire	Promoted from North 1 (1st)
Stoke-on-Trent	Hartwell Lane	2,000	Barlaston, Staffordshire	Promoted from Midlands 1 (1st)
Stourbridge	Stourton Park	2,000	Stourbridge, West Midlands	6th
Towcestrians	Greens Norton Road		Towchester, Northamptonshire	9th
Walsall	Broadway	2,500 (500 seats)	Walsall, West Midlands	11th
Winnington Park	Burrows Hill	5,000	Norwich, Cheshire	8th

== League table ==
1992–93 National Division 4 North table
Pos	Team	Pld	W	D	L	PF	PA	PD	Pts	Qualification
1	Harrogate (C)	12	10	1	1	363	115	+248	21	Promoted
2	Rotherham (R)	12	10	1	1	259	123	+136	21	Relegated
3	Preston Grasshoppers (R)	12	8	0	4	157	135	+22	16	Relegated
4	Stoke-on-Trent (R)	12	7	0	5	193	168	+25	14	Relegated
5	Lichfield (R)	12	6	1	5	221	224	−3	13	Relegated
6	Kendal (R)	12	6	0	6	182	189	−7	12	Relegated
7	Walsall (R)	12	6	0	6	160	192	−32	12	Relegated
8	Durham City (R)	12	6	0	6	179	219	−40	12	Relegated
9	Stourbridge (R)	12	5	1	6	161	144	+17	11	Relegated
10	Winnington Park (R)	12	5	1	6	167	165	+2	11	Relegated
11	Hereford (R)	12	2	2	8	147	216	−69	6	Relegated
12	Nuneaton (R)	12	2	0	10	138	269	−131	4	Relegated
13	Towcestrians (R)	12	1	1	10	118	286	−168	3	Relegated

Rules for classification: Points are awarded as follows: 2 pts for a win, 1 pt for a draw, 0 pts for a loss. If teams are level at any stage, difference between points for and against applies.
(C) Champions; (R) Relegated

== Sponsorship ==
Division 4 North is part of the Courage Clubs Championship and was sponsored by Courage Brewery.

== See also ==
- 1992-93 National Division 1
- 1992–93 National Division 2
- 1992–93 National Division 3
- 1992–93 National Division 4 South
