= 1993–94 National Division 3 =

Rugby union competition in England

- Countries: England
- Champions: Coventry (1st title)
- Runners-up: Fylde (also promoted)
- Relegated: Havant, Redruth
- Matches played: 90
- Top point scorer: 172 – Andy Finnie (Bedford)
- Top try scorer: 12 – Brendan Hanavan (Fylde)

The 1993–94 National Division 3 (sponsored by Courage Brewery) was the seventh season of the third tier of the English rugby union league system, the Courage Clubs Championship, currently known as National League 1. Due to widespread league restructuring at the end of the previous season there were multiple new teams in the division; Bedford, Blackheath, Coventry, Fylde, Morley, Richmond and Rosslyn Park, all of whom were relegated from tier 2, and there was no promotion into the league from tier 4.

Following their relegation last season, Coventry won the division and a quick return to the 1994–95 National Division 2 for next season. They are joined by the runner-up, Fylde, who were also relegated last season. Havant and Redruth are both relegated to the 1994–95 National Division 4. Havant were runners-up last season and would have been promoted to National Division 2 if the leagues had not been re-organised.

== Structure ==
Restructuring at the end of the previous season meant that the division had been reduced from twelve teams down to ten, but now for the first time each side played one another twice, in a round robin system, home and away, to make a total of eighteen matches for each team. The top two teams were promoted to National Division 2 while the bottom two teams were relegated to the new National Division 4.

== Participating teams and locations ==
1993–94 National Division 3 teams in England

Team	Stadium	Capacity	City/Area	Previous season
Bedford	Goldington Road	4,800 (800 seats)	Bedford, Bedfordshire	Relegated from National 2 (7th)
Blackheath	Rectory Field	3,500 (500 seats)	Greenwich, London	Relegated from National 2 (10th)
Coventry	Coundon Road	10,000 (1,100 seats)	Coventry, West Midlands	Relegated from National 2 (11th)
Exeter	County Ground	5,750 (750 seats)	Exeter, Devon	3rd
Fylde	Woodlands	7,500 (500 seats)	Lytham St Annes, Lancashire	Relegated from National 2 (12th)
Havant	Hook's Lane	3,000 (200 seats)	Havant, Hampshire	2nd (not promoted)
Morley	Scatcherd Lane	6,000 (1,000 seats)	Morley, Leeds, West Yorkshire	Relegated from National 2 (13th)
Redruth	Recreation Ground	12,000	Redruth, Cornwall	4th
Richmond	Athletic Ground	7,300 (1,300 seats)	Richmond, London	Relegated from National 2 (9th)
Rosslyn Park	The Rock	4,630 (630 seats)	Roehampton, London	Relegated from National 2 (8th)

== League table ==
1993–94 National Division 3 table
Pos	Team	Pld	W	D	L	PF	PA	PD	Pts	Qualification
1	Coventry (C)	18	14	0	4	406	259	+147	28	Promoted
2	Fylde	18	13	0	5	339	219	+120	26	Promoted
3	Bedford	18	12	0	6	332	260	+72	24	
4	Blackheath	18	11	0	7	305	222	+83	22	
5	Rosslyn Park	18	10	1	7	372	240	+132	21	
6	Exeter	18	9	1	8	308	271	+37	19	
7	Richmond	18	9	0	9	337	300	+37	18	
8	Morley	18	6	0	12	245	334	−89	12	
9	Havant	18	3	0	15	203	432	−229	6	Relegated
10	Redruth	18	2	0	16	178	488	−310	4	Relegated

Rules for classification: Points are awarded as follows: 2 pts for a win, 1 pt for a draw, 0 pts for a loss. If teams are level at any stage, the following tiebreaker is applied: Difference between points for and against.
(C) Champions

== See also ==
- 1993–94 National Division 1
- 1993–94 National Division 2
- 1993–94 National Division 4
- 1993–94 Courage League Division 5 North
- 1993–94 Courage League Division 5 South
