= 1992–93 National Division 4 South =

Rugby union competition in England

- Countries: England
- Champions: Sudbury (1st title)
- Runners-up: London Welsh
- Relegated: 12 teams (Note: The re-organization of the English league system by the RFU meant that all teams other than the champions would be relegated to the new look Courage League Division 5 South for the 1993-94 season.)
- Matches played: 156

The 1992–93 National Division 4 South was the sixth full season of rugby union within the fourth tier of the English league system, currently known as National League 2 South.

By the end of the campaign Sudbury were crowned league champions, 2 points clear of runners-up London Welsh. Impending changes to the league structure by the RFU meant that several new leagues were to be introduced. This meant that champions Sudbury were promoted into the newlook 1993–94 National Division 4, clubs ranked 2nd to 12th fell to the new 1993–94 National Division 5 South and Thurrock dropped two levels down to London & SE Division 1.

== Structure ==
Each team played one match against each of the other teams, playing a total of twelve matches each. Changes to the league structure by the RFU for the 1993-94 season meant that the champions are promoted to National Division 4, clubs ranked 2nd to 12th fell to National Division 5 South and the bottom club two levels to either London & SE Division 1 or South West Division 1 depending on locality.

== Participating teams and locations ==
Locations of the 1992–93 National Division 4 South South teams

Team	Ground	Capacity	City/Area	Previous season
Basingstoke	Down Grange	2,500	Basingstoke, Hampshire	2nd
Berry Hill	Lakers Road		Coleford, Gloucestershire	Promoted from South West 1 (champions)
Camborne	Recreation Ground	11,000	Camborne, Cornwall	6th
High Wycombe	Kingsmead Road		High Wycombe, Buckinghamshire	5th
London Welsh	Old Deer Park	4,500 (1,500 seats)	Richmond, London	3rd
Lydney	Regentsholm	3,000 (340 seats)	Lydney, Gloucestershire	Relegated from National 3 (12th)
Maidstone	William Davey Memorial	2,000 (100 seats)	Maidstone, Kent	8th
Metropolitan Police	Imber Court	3,500 (500 seats)	East Molesey, Surrey	10th
North Walsham	Norwich Road	1,200	Scottow, Norfolk	7th
Southend	Warners Park	1,500 (150 seats)	Southend, Essex	11th
Sudbury	Moorsfield	1,000	Sudbury, Suffolk	4th
Thurrock	Oakfield		Grays, Essex	Promoted from London 1 (champions)
Weston-super-Mare	Recreation Ground	3,000	Weston-super-Mare, Somerset	9th

== League table ==
1992–93 Courage National League 4 South table
Pos	Team	Pld	W	D	L	PF	PA	PD	Pts	Qualification
1	Sudbury (C)	12	11	1	0	337	130	+207	22 (Note: 1 point deducted?)	Promoted
2	London Welsh (R)	12	10	0	2	353	170	+183	20	Relegated
3	Lydney (R)	12	8	0	4	187	170	+17	16	Relegated
4	Camborne (R)	12	7	1	4	180	168	+12	15	Relegated
5	Basingstoke (R)	12	7	0	5	192	145	+47	14	Relegated
6	Southend (R)	12	6	1	5	196	189	+7	13	Relegated
7	Berry Hill (R)	12	4	3	5	187	216	−29	11	Relegated
8	High Wycombe (R)	12	5	0	7	196	159	+37	10	Relegated
9	Metropolitan Police (R)	12	4	1	7	201	207	−6	9	Relegated
10	Weston-super-Mare (R)	12	4	1	7	154	226	−72	9	Relegated
11	North Walsham (R)	12	4	0	8	125	209	−84	8	Relegated
12	Maidstone (R)	12	2	0	10	122	306	−184	4	Relegated
13	Thurrock (R)	12	2	0	10	147	295	−148	4	Relegated

Rules for classification: Points are awarded as follows: 2 pts for a win, 1 pt for a draw, 0 pts for a loss. If teams are level at any stage, difference between points for and against applies.
(C) Champions; (R) Relegated

== Sponsorship ==
National League 4 South is part of the Courage Clubs Championship and is sponsored by Courage Brewery.

== See also ==
- 1992-93 National Division 1
- 1992–93 National Division 2
- 1992–93 National Division 3
- 1992–93 National Division 4 North
