= 1993–94 National Division 1 =

Rugby union competition in England

- Countries: England
- Date: 11 September 1993 – 30 April 1994
- Champions: Bath (5th title)
- Runners-up: Leicester
- Relegated: Newcastle Gosforth; London Irish
- Matches played: 90
- Top point scorer: 202 – Jez Harris (Leicester)
- Top try scorer: 11 – Daren O'Leary (Harlequins)

Official website
- www.premiershiprugby.com

The 1993–94 National Division 1 (sponsored by Courage Brewery) was the seventh season of the top tier of the English rugby union league system, the Courage Clubs Championship, currently known as Premiership Rugby. Bath were the defending champions and the only new side was promoted team Newcastle.

At the end of the season Bath retained their league title once again, making it four in a row (and fifth overall), six points clear of runners up Leicester. Newcastle Gosforth and London Irish were relegated to the 1994–95 National Division 2.

== Structure ==
Restructuring at the end of the previous season meant that the division had been reduced from fourteen teams down to ten, but now for the first time each side played one another twice, in a round robin system, home and away, to make a total of eighteen matches for each team. The bottom two teams are relegated to National Division 2.

== Participating teams ==
Locations of the 1993–94 Courage League National Division One teams

Team	Stadium	Capacity	City/Area	Previous season
Bath	Recreation Ground	8,300 (1,000 seats)	Bath, Somerset	Champions
Bristol	Memorial Stadium	8,500 (1,200 seats)	Bristol, Avon	6th
Gloucester	Kingsholm	12,000	Gloucester, Gloucestershire	5th
Harlequins	The Stoop	9,000 (2,000 seats)	Twickenham, London	8th
Leicester	Welford Road	14,700 (9,200 seats)	Leicester, Leicestershire	3rd
London Irish	The Avenue	3,600 (600 seats)	Sunbury-on-Thames, Surrey	7th
Newcastle Gosforth	Kingston Park	6,600	Newcastle upon Tyne, Tyne and Wear	Promoted from National 2 (1st)
Northampton	Franklin's Gardens	6,000 (2,000 seats)	Northampton, Northamptonshire	4th
Orrell	Edge Hall Road	5,300 (300 seats)	Orrell, Greater Manchester	9th
Wasps	Repton Avenue	3,200 (1,200 seats)	Sudbury, London	2nd

== Table ==
Pos	Team	Pld	W	D	L	PF	PA	PD	Pts
1	Bath Rugby (C)	18	17	0	1	431	181	+250	34
2	Leicester	18	14	0	4	425	210	+215	28
3	Wasps	18	10	1	7	362	340	+22	21
4	Bristol	18	10	0	8	331	276	+55	20
5	Northampton	18	9	0	9	305	342	−37	18
6	Harlequins	18	8	0	10	333	287	+46	16
7	Orrell	18	8	0	10	327	302	+25	16
8	Gloucester	18	6	2	10	247	356	−109	14
9	London Irish (R)	18	4	0	14	217	391	−174	8
10	Newcastle Gosforth (R)	18	2	1	15	190	483	−293	5

(C) Champions; (R) Relegated

== Results ==
The Home Team is listed in the left column.

Home \ Away	BAT	BRI	GLO	HAR	LEI	LOI	NEW	NOR	ORR	WAS
Bath Rugby		9–0	46–17	32–13	14–6	28–8	46–3	37–9	13–7	24–8
Bristol	10–18		16–12	20–16	40–22	21–8	26–0	22–31	30–17	15–16
Gloucester RFC	6–16	6–24		24–20	14–23	9–10	15–9	19–14	30–25	9–9
Harlequins	12–14	15–20	38–20		13–25	30–15	12–6	15–7	13–20	22–17
Leicester	9–6	21–9	28–8	3–10		38–3	66–5	36–9	23–18	38–6
London Irish	31–32	0–16	12–15	7–33	10–22		17–19	13–16	19–6	14–29
Newcastle Gosforth	5–29	13–22	12–12	3–22	13–22	9–13		8–28	13–12	16–18
Northampton	9–30	22–19	19–3	15–14	19–10	23–12	43–23		9–13	15–17
Orrell	15–18	16–13	6–10	21–20	0–18	24–3	42–12	27–6		42–24
Wasps	13–19	34–8	29–18	18–15	13–15	21–22	38–21	24–11	28–16	

Legend: Blue = home team win; Yellow = draw; Red = away team win.

== Fixtures & Results ==
=== Round 1 ===
11 September 1993

Bristol	10 – 18	Bath

Memorial Stadium
Referee: David Matthews

11 September 1993

Gloucester	9 – 9	Wasps

Kingsholm

11 September 1993

Harlequins	30 – 15	London Irish

The Stoop

11 September 1993

Northampton	19 – 10	Leicester

Franklin's Gardens

11 September 1993

Orrell	42 – 12	Newcastle Gosforth

Edge Hall Road

=== Round 2 ===
18 September 1993

Bath	37 – 9	Northampton

Recreation Ground
Referee: John Pearson

18 September 1993

Leicester	23 – 18	Orrell

Welford Road

18 September 1993

London Irish	0 – 16	Bristol

The Avenue

18 September 1993

Newcastle Gosforth	12 – 12	Gloucester

Kingston Park

18 September 1993

Wasps	18 – 15	Harlequins

Repton Avenue

=== Round 3 ===
25 September 1993

Gloucester	14 – 23	Leicester

Kingsholm

25 September 1993

Harlequins	15 – 20	Bristol

The Stoop

25 September 1993

Northampton	23 – 12	London Irish

Franklin's Gardens

25 September 1993

Orrell	15 – 18	Bath

Edge Hall Road
Referee: Chris Rees

25 September 1993

Wasps	38 – 21	Newcastle Gosforth

Repton Avenue

=== Round 4 ===
2 October 1993

Bath	46 – 17	Gloucester

Recreation Ground
Attendance: 8,000
Referee: Brian Campsall

2 October 1993

Bristol	22 – 31	Northampton

Memorial Stadium

2 October 1993

Leicester	38 – 6	Wasps

Welford Road

2 October 1993

London Irish	19 – 6	Orrell

The Avenue

2 October 1993

Newcastle Gosforth	3 – 22	Harlequins

Kingston Park

=== Round 5 ===
9 October 1993

Gloucester	9 – 10	London Irish

Kingsholm

9 October 1993

Harlequins	15 – 7	Northampton

The Stoop

9 October 1993

Newcastle Gosforth	13 – 22	Leicester

Kingston Park

9 October 1993

Orrell	16 – 13	Bristol

Edge Hall Road

9 October 1993

Wasps	13 – 19	Bath

Repton Avenue
Referee: Gordon Black

=== Round 6 ===
13 November 1993

Bath	46 – 3	Newcastle Gosforth

Recreation Ground
Referee: John Burtenshaw

13 November 1993

Bristol	16 – 12	Gloucester

Memorial Stadium

13 November 1993

Leicester	3 – 10	Harlequins

Welford Road

13 November 1993

London Irish	P – P	Wasps

The Avenue

- Postponed due to London Irish missing 3 players due to international callouts (Ireland v Romania). Game rescheduled to 26 February 1994.

13 November 1993

Northampton	9 – 13	Orrell

Franklin's Gardens

=== Round 7 ===
20 November 1993

Gloucester	19 – 14	Northampton

Kingsholm

20 November 1993

Leicester	9 – 6	Bath

Welford Road
Attendance: 14,000
Referee: Jim Pearson

20 November 1993

Newcastle Gosforth	9 – 13	London Irish

Kingston Park

20 November 1993

Orrell	21 – 20	Harlequins

Edge Hall Road

20 November 1993

Wasps	34 – 8	Bristol

Repton Avenue

=== Round 8 ===
4 December 1993

Bristol	26 – 0	Newcastle Gosforth

Memorial Stadium

4 December 1993

Harlequins	12 – 14	Bath

The Stoop
Referee: Stuart Piercy

4 December 1993

London Irish	10 – 22	Leicester

The Avenue

4 December 1993

Northampton	15 – 17	Wasps

Franklin's Gardens

4 December 1993

Orrell	6 – 10	Gloucester

Edge Hall Road

=== Round 9 ===
11 December 1993

Bath	28 – 8	London Irish

Recreation Ground
Referee: Steve Lander

11 December 1993

Gloucester	24 – 20	Harlequins

Kingsholm

11 December 1993

Leicester	21 – 9	Bristol

Welford Road

11 December 1993

Newcastle Gosforth	8 – 28	Northampton

Kingston Park

11 December 1993

Wasps	28 – 16	Orrell

Repton Avenue

=== Round 10 ===
8 January 1994

Bath	9 – 0	Bristol

Recreation Ground
Referee: David Leslie

8 January 1994

Leicester	36 – 9	Northampton

Welford Road

8 January 1994

London Irish	7 – 33	Harlequins

The Avenue

8 January 1994

Newcastle Gosforth	P – P	Orrell

Kingston Park

- Postponed. Game rescheduled to 16 April 1994.

8 January 1994

Wasps	29 – 18	Gloucester

Repton Avenue

=== Round 11 ===
15 January 1994

Bristol	P – P	London Irish

- Postponed. Game rescheduled to 2 April 1994.

15 January 1994

Gloucester	15 – 9	Newcastle Gosforth

Kingsholm

15 January 1994

Harlequins	22 – 17	Wasps

The Stoop

15 January 1994

Northampton	9 – 30	Bath

Franklin's Gardens
Referee: David Matthews

15 January 1994

Orrell	0 – 18	Leicester

Edge Hall Road

=== Round 12 ===
29 January 1994

Bath	13 – 7	Orrell

Recreation Ground
Referee: Ed Morrison

29 January 1994

Bristol	20 – 16	Harlequins

Memorial Stadium

29 January 1994

Leicester	28 – 8	Gloucester

Welford Road

29 January 1994

London Irish	13 – 16	Northampton

The Avenue

29 January 1994

Newcastle Gosforth	16 – 18	Wasps

Kingston Park

=== Round 13 ===
12 February 1994

Gloucester	6 – 16	Bath

Kingsholm
Attendance: 9,000
Referee: Jim Pearson

12 February 1994

Harlequins	12 – 6	Newcastle Gosforth

The Stoop

12 February 1994

Northampton	22 – 19	Bristol

Franklin's Gardens

12 February 1994

Orrell	24 – 3	London Irish

Edge Hall Road

12 February 1994

Wasps	13 – 15	Leicester

Repton Avenue

=== Round 6 (rescheduled game) ===
26 February 1994

London Irish	14 – 29	Wasps

The Avenue

- Game rescheduled from 13 November.

=== Round 14 ===
12 March 1994

Bath	24 – 8	Wasps

Recreation Ground
Attendance: 7,000
Referee: Geraint Davies

12 March 1994

Bristol	30 – 17	Orrell

Memorial Stadium

12 March 1994

Leicester	66 – 5	Newcastle Gosforth

Welford Road

12 March 1994

London Irish	12 – 15	Gloucester

The Avenue

12 March 1994

Northampton	15 – 14	Harlequins

Franklin's Gardens

=== Round 15 ===
26 March 1994

Gloucester	6 – 24	Bristol

Kingsholm

26 March 1994

Harlequins	13 – 25	Leicester

The Stoop

26 March 1994

Newcastle Gosforth	5 – 29	Bath

Kingston Park
Referee: Doug Chapman

- Newcastle Gosforth are relegated.

26 March 1994

Orrell	27 – 6	Northampton

Edge Hall Road

26 March 1994

Wasps	21 – 22	London Irish

Repton Avenue

=== Round 11 (rescheduled game) ===
2 April 1994

Bristol	21 – 8	London Irish

Memorial Stadium

- Game rescheduled from 15 January 1994. London Irish are relegated.

=== Round 16 ===
9 April 1994

Bath	14 – 6	Leicester

Recreation Ground
Referee: David Leslie

9 April 1994

Bristol	P – P	Wasps

Memorial Stadium

- Postponed. Game rescheduled to 19 April 1994.

9 April 1994

Harlequins	13 – 20	Orrell

The Stoop

9 April 1994

London Irish	17 – 19	Newcastle Gosforth

The Avenue

9 April 1994

Northampton	19 – 3	Gloucester

Franklin's Gardens

=== Round 10 (rescheduled game) ===
16 April 1994

Newcastle Gosforth	13 – 12	Orrell

Kingston Park

- Game rescheduled from 8 January 1994.

=== Round 16 (rescheduled game) ===
19 April 1994

Bristol	15 – 16	Wasps

Memorial Stadium

- Game rescheduled from 9 April 1994.

=== Round 17 ===
23 April 1994

Bath	32 – 13	Harlequins

Recreation Ground
Attendance: 8,000
Referee: Jim Pearson

- Bath are champions.

23 April 1994

Gloucester	30 – 25	Orrell

Kingsholm

23 April 1994

Leicester	38 – 3	London Irish

Welford Road

23 April 1994

Newcastle Gosforth	13 – 22	Bristol

Kingston Park

23 April 1994

Wasps	24 – 11	Northampton

Repton Avenue

=== Round 18 ===
30 April 1994

Bristol	40 – 22	Leicester

Memorial Stadium

30 April 1994

Harlequins	38 – 20	Gloucester

The Stoop

30 April 1994

London Irish	31 – 32	Bath

The Avenue
Referee: Geraint Hughes

30 April 1994

Northampton	43 – 23	Newcastle Gosforth

Franklin's Gardens

30 April 1994

Orrell	42 – 24	Wasps

Edge Hall Road

== See also ==
- 1993–94 National Division 2
- 1993–94 National Division 3
- 1993–94 National Division 4
- 1993–94 Courage League Division 5 North
- 1993–94 Courage League Division 5 South
