= 1992–93 National Division 2 =

Rugby division tournament

- Countries: England
- Date: 19 September 1992 – 24 April 1993
- Champions: Newcastle Gosforth (1st title)
- Runners-up: Waterloo
- Relegated: Bedford, Rosslyn Park; Richmond, Blackheath; Coventry, Fylde; Morley
- Matches played: 78
- Top point scorer: 136 – David Johnson (Newcastle Gosforth)
- Top try scorer: 7 – Jon Sleightholme (Wakefield)

The 1992–93 National Division 2 (sponsored by Courage Brewery) was the sixth season of the second tier of the English rugby union league system, the Courage Clubs Championship, currently known as Champ Rugby. New teams to the division included Nottingham and Rosslyn Park who were relegated down from the top flight, while West Hartlepool, Fylde and Richmond were promoted up from tier 3.

At the sixth attempt, Newcastle Gosforth the champions, were promoted to the 1993–94 National Division 1. Due to next seasons restructuring of teams in the top two divisions, second placed Waterloo did not gain promotion and seven teams were relegated to the 1993–94 National Division 3. They were Bedford, Rosslyn Park, Richmond, Blackheath, Coventry, Flyde and Morley. Rosslyn Park were relegated for the second successive season.

== Structure ==
Each team played one match against each of the other teams, playing a total of twelve matches each. Due to next seasons reduction of teams from thirteen to ten in the top two divisions, only one team would be promoted to National Division 1 while seven teams would drop down to National Division 3.

== Participating teams ==
Locations of the 1992–93 National Division 2 teams

| Team | Stadium | Capacity | City/Area | Previous season |
|---|---|---|---|---|
| Bedford | Goldington Road | 4,800 (800 seats) | Bedford, Bedfordshire | 10th |
| Blackheath | Rectory Field | 3,500 (500 seats) | Greenwich, London | 11th |
| Coventry | Coundon Road | 10,000 (1,100 seats) | Coventry, West Midlands | 6th |
| Fylde | Woodlands | 7,500 (500 seats) | Lytham St Annes, Lancashire | Promoted from National 3 (2nd) |
| Morley | Scatcherd Lane | 6,000 (1,000 seats) | Morley, Leeds, West Yorkshire | 9th |
| Moseley | The Reddings | 9,999 (1,800 seats) | Birmingham, West Midlands | 7th |
| Newcastle Gosforth | Kingston Park | 6,600 | Newcastle upon Tyne, Tyne and Wear | 4th |
| Nottingham | Ireland Avenue | 4,990 (590 seats) | Beeston, Nottinghamshire | Relegated from National 1 (12th) |
| Richmond | Athletic Ground | 7,300 (1,300 seats) | Richmond, London | Promoted from National 3 (1st) |
| Rosslyn Park | The Rock | 4,630 (630 seats) | Roehampton, London | Relegated from National 1 (13th) |
| Sale | Heywood Road | 4,000 (500 seats) | Sale, Greater Manchester | 8th |
| Wakefield | College Grove | 4,000 (500 seats) | Wakefield, West Yorkshire | 5th |
| Waterloo | St Anthony's Road | 9,950 (950 seats) | Blundellsands, Merseyside | 3rd |

== Table ==
1992–93 National Division 2 table
| Pos | Team | Pld | W | D | L | PF | PA | PD | Pts | Qualification |
|---|---|---|---|---|---|---|---|---|---|---|
| 1 | Newcastle Gosforth | 12 | 10 | 0 | 2 | 241 | 106 | +135 | 20 | Promoted |
| 2 | Waterloo | 12 | 10 | 0 | 2 | 228 | 138 | +90 | 20 | |
| 3 | Wakefield | 12 | 8 | 1 | 3 | 186 | 123 | +63 | 17 | |
| 4 | Nottingham | 12 | 8 | 0 | 4 | 249 | 145 | +104 | 16 | |
| 5 | Sale | 12 | 7 | 1 | 4 | 237 | 102 | +135 | 15 | |
| 6 | Moseley | 12 | 6 | 2 | 4 | 184 | 150 | +34 | 14 | |
| 7 | Bedford Blues | 12 | 6 | 2 | 4 | 186 | 183 | +3 | 14 | Relegated |
| 8 | Rosslyn Park | 12 | 5 | 0 | 7 | 209 | 199 | +10 | 10 | Relegated |
| 9 | Richmond | 12 | 5 | 0 | 7 | 202 | 196 | +6 | 10 | Relegated |
| 10 | Blackheath | 12 | 4 | 2 | 6 | 142 | 231 | −89 | 10 | Relegated |
| 11 | Coventry | 12 | 3 | 0 | 9 | 192 | 236 | −44 | 6 | Relegated |
| 12 | Fylde | 12 | 0 | 3 | 9 | 108 | 290 | −182 | 3 | Relegated |
| 13 | Morley | 12 | 0 | 1 | 11 | 107 | 372 | −265 | 1 | Relegated |

Source: rugbyarchive.net
Rules for classification: Points were awarded as follows:
1. two points for a win
2. one point for a draw
3. no points for a loss

If teams were level at any stage, tiebreakers were applied in the following order:

1. difference between points for and against
2. total number of points for

== Fixtures & Results ==
=== Round 1 ===
19 September 1992

| Blackheath | 9 – 9 | Wakefield |

Rectory Field

19 September 1992

| Coventry | 41 – 3 | Morley |

Coundon Road

19 September 1992

| Moseley | 9 – 9 | Bedford |

The Reddings

19 September 1992

| Nottingham | 17 – 12 | Richmond |

Ireland Avenue

19 September 1992

| Sale | 51 – 3 | Fylde |

Heywood Road

19 September 1992

| Waterloo | 12 – 9 | Rosslyn Park |

St Anthony's Road

Bye/s: Newcastle Gosforth

=== Round 2 ===
24 September 1992

| Blackheath | 5 – 46 | Nottingham |

Rectory Field

24 September 1992

| Coventry | 6 – 32 | Waterloo |

Coundon Road

24 September 1992

| Morley | 6 – 13 | Moseley |

Scatcherd Lane

24 September 1992

| Newcastle Gosforth | 7 – 3 | Sale |

Kingston Park

24 September 1992

| Richmond | 29 – 6 | Fylde |

Athletic Ground

24 September 1992

| Wakefield | 27 – 3 | Bedford |

College Grove

Bye/s: Rosslyn Park

=== Round 3 ===
3 October 1992

| Bedford | 22 – 16 | Richmond |

Goldington Road

3 October 1992

| Fylde | 9 – 22 | Rosslyn Park |

Woodlands Memorial Ground

3 October 1992

| Moseley | 3 – 14 | Wakefield |

The Reddings

3 October 1992

| Nottingham | 16 – 10 | Coventry |

Ireland Avenue

3 October 1992

| Sale | 34 – 0 | Morley |

Heywood Road

3 October 1992

| Waterloo | 3 – 13 | Newcastle Gosforth |

St Anthony's Road

Bye/s: Blackheath

=== Round 4 ===
10 October 1992

| Coventry | 38 – 15 | Blackheath |

Coundon Road

10 October 1992

| Morley | 12 – 27 | Waterloo |

Scatcherd Lane

10 October 1992

| Newcastle Gosforth | 28 – 6 | Nottingham |

Kingston Park

10 October 1992

| Richmond | 28 – 21 | Moseley |

Athletic Ground

10 October 1992

| Rosslyn Park | 13 – 16 | Bedford |

The Rock

10 October 1992

| Wakefield | 6 – 12 | Sale |

College Grove

Bye/s: Fylde

=== Round 5 ===
24 October 1992

| Bedford | 24 – 12 | Fylde |

Goldington Road

24 October 1992

| Blackheath | 9 – 12 | Newcastle Gosforth |

Rectory Field

24 October 1992

| Moseley | 32 – 10 | Rosslyn Park |

The Reddings

24 October 1992

| Nottingham | 78 – 0 | Morley |

Ireland Avenue

24 October 1992

| Sale | 21 – 10 | Richmond |

Heywood Road

24 October 1992

| Waterloo | 22 – 11 | Wakefield |

St Anthony's Road

Bye/s: Coventry

=== Round 6 ===
31 October 1992

| Fylde | 15 – 15 | Moseley |

Woodlands Memorial Ground

31 October 1992

| Morley | 8 – 23 | Blackheath |

Scatcherd Lane

31 October 1992

| Newcastle Gosforth | 26 – 3 | Coventry |

Kingston Park

31 October 1992

| Richmond | 12 – 16 | Waterloo |

Athletic Ground

31 October 1992

| Rosslyn Park | 18 – 8 | Sale |

The Rock

31 October 1992

| Wakefield | 22 – 9 | Nottingham |

College Grove

Bye/s: Bedford

=== Round 7 ===
21 November 1992

| Bedford | 9 – 9 | Sale |

Goldington Road

21 November 1992

| Fylde | 14 – 15 | Waterloo |

Woodlands Memorial Ground

21 November 1992

| Morley | 13 – 36 | Newcastle Gosforth |

Scatcherd Lane

21 November 1992

| Richmond | 13 – 23 | Blackheath |

Athletic Ground

21 November 1992

| Rosslyn Park | 6 – 18 | Nottingham |

The Rock

21 November 1992

| Wakefield | 8 – 0 | Coventry |

College Grove

Bye/s: Moseley

=== Round 8 ===
9 January 1993

| Blackheath | 18 – 14 | Rosslyn Park |

Rectory Field

9 January 1993

| Coventry | 13 – 18 | Richmond |

Coundon Road

9 January 1993

| Newcastle Gosforth | 17 – 20 | Wakefield |

Kingston Park

9 January 1993

| Nottingham | 19 – 8 | Fylde |

Ireland Avenue

9 January 1993

| Sale | 6 – 13 | Moseley |

Heywood Road

9 January 1993

| Waterloo | 28 – 8 | Bedford |

St Anthony's Road

Bye/s: Morley

=== Round 9 ===
13 February 1993

| Bedford | 15 – 9 | Nottingham |

Goldington Road

13 February 1993

| Fylde | 9 – 9 | Blackheath |

Woodlands Memorial Ground

13 February 1993

| Moseley | 9 – 12 | Waterloo |

The Reddings

13 February 1993

| Richmond | 9 – 21 | Newcastle Gosforth |

Athletic Ground

13 February 1993

| Rosslyn Park | 32 – 10 | Coventry |

The Rock

13 February 1993

| Wakefield | 16 – 15 | Morley |

College Grove

Bye/s: Sale

=== Round 10 ===
13 March 1993

| Blackheath | 16 – 12 | Bedford |

Rectory Field

13 March 1993

| Coventry | 37 – 10 | Fylde |

Coundon Road

13 March 1993

| Morley | 6 – 28 | Richmond |

Scatcherd Lane

13 March 1993

| Newcastle Gosforth | 14 – 3 | Rosslyn Park |

Kingston Park

13 March 1993

| Nottingham | 9 – 5 | Moseley |

Ireland Avenue

13 March 1993

| Waterloo | 25 – 24 | Sale |

St Anthony's Road

Bye/s: Wakefield

=== Round 11 ===
27 March 1993

| Bedford | 30 – 15 | Coventry |

Goldington Road

27 March 1993

| Fylde | 5 – 32 | Newcastle Gosforth |

Woodlands Memorial Ground

27 March 1993

| Moseley | 23 – 6 | Blackheath |

The Reddings

27 March 1993

| Richmond | 11 – 6 | Wakefield |

Athletic Ground

27 March 1993

| Rosslyn Park | 43 – 24 | Morley |

The Rock

27 March 1993

| Sale | 25 – 8 | Nottingham |

Heywood Road

Bye/s: Waterloo

=== Round 12 ===
3 April 1993

| Blackheath | 3 – 20 | Sale |

Rectory Field

3 April 1993

| Coventry | 19 – 22 | Moseley |

Coundon Road

3 April 1993

| Morley | 10 – 10 | Fylde |

Scatcherd Lane

3 April 1993

| Newcastle Gosforth | 19 – 13 | Bedford |

Kingston Park

3 April 1993

| Nottingham | 14 – 9 | Waterloo |

Ireland Avenue

3 April 1993

| Wakefield | 20 – 15 | Rosslyn Park |

College Grove

Bye/s: Richmond

=== Round 13 ===
24 April 1993

| Bedford | 25 – 10 | Morley |

Goldington Road

24 April 1993

| Fylde | 7 – 27 | Wakefield |

Woodlands Memorial Ground

24 April 1993

| Moseley | 19 – 16 | Newcastle Gosforth |

The Reddings

- Newcastle Gosforth are promoted as league champions.

24 April 1993

| Rosslyn Park | 24 – 18 | Richmond |

The Rock

24 April 1993

| Sale | 24 – 0 | Coventry |

Heywood Road

24 April 1993

| Waterloo | 27 – 6 | Blackheath |

St Anthony's Road

Bye/s: Nottingham

== See also ==
- 1992–93 National Division 1
- 1992–93 National Division 3
- 1992–93 National Division 4 North
- 1992–93 National Division 4 South
