= 1993–94 National Division 4 =

English league system

- Countries: England
- Champions: Clifton (1st title)
- Runners-up: Harrogate (also promoted)
- Relegated: Sudbury, Sheffield
- Matches played: 162
- Top point scorer: 222 – Simon Hogg (Clifton)
- Top try scorer: 16 – Jon Phillips (Clifton)

The 1993–94 National Division 4 was the seventh full season of rugby union within the fourth tier of the English league system, currently the regional divisions National League 2 South and National League 2 North, and the first using the name National Division 4. The league had been created at the start of the season by the RFU as part of their league restructuring, making tier 4 a single national league (previously it had been divided into north and south) and developing a new tier 5 (Courage League Division 5), which used the old regional north/south divisions.

By the season's end, Clifton were crowned as champions, finishing 4 points clear of second-placed Harrogate. Both sides would be promoted to the 1994–95 National Division 3. At the opposite end of the table, Sudbury and Sheffield would be relegated. Sudbury would drop to Courage League Division 5 South while Sheffield would fall to Courage League Division 5 North.

== Structure ==
Each team played a total of 18 home and away matches against each of the other teams – the first time tier 4 used a home and away system. The champions and runners up were promoted to National Division 3 while the bottom two teams were relegated to either Courage League Division 5 North or Courage League Division 5 South, depending on their locality.

== Participating teams and locations ==
1993–94 National Division 4 teams in England

Team	Stadium	Capacity	City/Area	Previous season
Askeans	Broad Walk	1,500 (300 seats)	Kidbrooke, London	Relegated from National 3 (10th)
Aspatria	Bower Park	3,000 (300 seats)	Aspatria, Cumbria	Relegated from National 3 (9th)
Broughton Park	Chelsfield Grove	2,000 (400 seats)	Chorlton-cum-Hardy, Manchester	Relegated from National 3 (11th)
Clifton	Station Road	2,200 (200 seats)	Cribbs Causeway, Henbury, Bristol	Relegated from National 3 (8th)
Harrogate	Claro Road	4,500 (500 seats)	Harrogate, North Yorkshire	Promoted from National 4 North (1st)
Leeds	Clarence Fields	7,850 (850 seats)	Leeds, West Yorkshire	Relegated from National 3 (6th)
Liverpool St Helens	Moss Lane	4,370 (370 seats)	St Helens, Merseyside	Relegated from National 3 (7th)
Plymouth Albion	Beacon Park	1,950 (450 seats)	Plymouth, Devon	Relegated from National 3 (12th)
Sheffield	Abbeydale Park	3,300 (100 seats) (Note: Although a 1990 club estimate was 1,100 (100 seated and 1,000 standing) this is very conservative as Abbeydale Park would experience 3,000+ crowds several times in later history in what was a relatively unchanged ground.)	Dore, Sheffield, South Yorkshire	Relegated from National 3 (5th)
Sudbury	Moorsfield	1,000	Sudbury, Suffolk	Promoted from National 4 South (1st)

== League table ==
1993–94 National Division 4 table
Pos	Team	Pld	W	D	L	PF	PA	PD	Pts	Qualification
1	Clifton (C)	18	16	2	0	477	205	+272	34	Promoted
2	Harrogate (P)	18	14	2	2	479	219	+260	30	Promoted
3	Liverpool St Helens	18	11	1	6	396	275	+121	23	
4	Plymouth Albion	18	9	0	9	286	416	−130	18	
5	Aspatria	18	8	0	10	303	372	−69	16	
6	Leeds	18	7	0	11	243	318	−75	14	
7	Askeans	18	6	1	11	268	358	−90	13	
8	Broughton Park	18	6	0	12	243	356	−113	12	
9	Sheffield (R)	18	5	1	12	287	310	−23	11	Relegated
10	Sudbury (R)	18	4	1	13	240	393	−153	9	Relegated

Rules for classification: Points are awarded as follows: 2 pts for a win, 1 pt for a draw, 0 pts for a loss. If teams are level at any stage, difference between points for and against applies.
(C) Champions; (P) Promoted; (R) Relegated

== Sponsorship ==
National Division 4 is part of the Courage Clubs Championship and is sponsored by Courage Brewery.

== See also ==
- 1993–94 National Division 1
- 1993–94 National Division 1
- 1993–94 National Division 1
- 1993–94 Courage League Division 5 North
- 1993–94 Courage League Division 5 South
