= 1993–94 National Division 2 =

Rugby union competition in England

- Countries: England
- Date: 11 September 1993 – 30 April 1994
- Champions: Sale (1st title)
- Runners-up: West Hartlepool
- Relegated: Rugby; Otley
- Matches played: 90
- Top point scorer: 172 – Guy Gregory (Nottingham)
- Top try scorer: 16 – Simon Verbickas (Sale)

The 1993–94 National Division 2 (sponsored by Courage Brewery) was the seventh season of the second tier of the English rugby union league system, the Courage Clubs Championship, currently known as Champ Rugby. New teams to the division included London Scottish, Rugby, Saracens, West Hartlepool (all relegated from tier 1) and Otley (promoted from tier 3).

Sale, the champions, were promoted to the 1994–95 National Division 1 along with the runners–up West Hartlepool. It was Sale's sixth attempt at returning to the top level whilst West Hartlepool go back up at the first attempt. Otley finished last and were relegated to the 1994–95 National Division 3 along with Rugby Lions who finish one place above them. Both teams had been promoted the previous season.

== Structure ==
Restructuring at the end of the previous season meant that the division had been reduced from thirteen teams down to ten, but now for the first time each side played one another twice, in a round robin system, home and away, to make a total of eighteen matches for each team. The top two teams were promoted to National Division 1 while the bottom two teams were relegated to National Division 3.

== Participating teams ==
Locations of the 1993–94 National Division 2 teams

Team	Stadium	Capacity	City/Area	Previous season
London Scottish	Athletic Ground	7,300 (1,300 seats)	Richmond, London	Relegated from National 1 (10th)
Moseley	The Reddings	9,999 (1,800 seats)	Birmingham, West Midlands	6th
Nottingham	Ireland Avenue	4,990 (590 seats)	Beeston, Nottinghamshire	4th
Otley	Cross Green	7,000 (852 seats)	Otley, West Yorkshire	Promoted from National 3 (1st)
Rugby	Webb Ellis Road	3,200 (200 seats)	Rugby, Warwickshire	Relegated from National 1 (13th)
Sale	Heywood Road	4,000 (500 seats)	Sale, Greater Manchester	5th
Saracens	Bramley Road	2,300 (300 seats)	Enfield, London	Relegated from National 1 (11th)
Wakefield	College Grove	4,000 (500 seats)	Wakefield, West Yorkshire	3rd
Waterloo	St Anthony's Road	9,950 (950 seats)	Blundellsands, Merseyside	2nd
West Hartlepool	Brierton Lane	7,000	Hartlepool, County Durham	Relegated from National 1 (12th)

== Table ==
1993–94 National Division 2 table
Pos	Team	Pld	W	D	L	PF	PA	PD	Pts	Qualification
1	Sale (C)	18	13	2	3	438	160	+278	28	Promoted
2	West Hartlepool	18	13	2	3	389	271	+118	28	Promoted
3	Saracens	18	11	1	6	299	238	+61	23	
4	Wakefield	18	8	3	7	347	240	+107	19	
5	Moseley	18	9	1	8	266	220	+46	19	
6	Nottingham	18	8	1	9	254	326	−72	17	
7	Waterloo	18	6	2	10	231	346	−115	14	
8	London Scottish	18	6	0	12	232	325	−93	12	
9	Rugby	18	5	1	12	186	302	−116	11	Relegated
10	Otley	18	4	1	13	235	449	−214	9	Relegated

Rules for classification: Points are awarded as follows:
1. two points for a win
2. one point for a draw
3. no points for a loss

If teams are level at any stage, tiebreakers are applied in the following order:

1. difference between points for and against
2. total number of points for
  (C) Champions

== Fixtures & Results ==
=== Round 1 ===
11 September 1993

London Scottish	3 – 12	Sale

Athletic Ground

11 September 1993

Nottingham	25 – 30	Otley

Ireland Avenue

11 September 1993

Saracens	14 – 10	Moseley

Bramley Road

11 September 1993

Wakefield	48 – 16	Rugby

College Grove

11 September 1993

West Hartlepool	30 – 11	Waterloo

Brierton Lane

=== Round 2 ===
18 September 1993

Moseley	20 – 11	Wakefield

The Reddings

18 September 1993

Otley	11 – 28	West Hartlepool

Cross Green

18 September 1993

Rugby	16 – 14	Nottingham

Webb Ellis Road

18 September 1993

Sale	52 – 3	Saracens

Heywood Road

18 September 1993

Waterloo	13 – 17	London Scottish

St Anthony's Road

=== Round 3 ===
25 September 1993

London Scottish	3 – 11	Otley

Athletic Ground

25 September 1993

Nottingham	6 – 25	Moseley

Ireland Avenue

25 September 1993

Sale	15 – 6	Waterloo

Heywood Road

25 September 1993

Saracens	25 – 10	Wakefield

Bramley Road

25 September 1993

West Hartlepool	28 – 19	Rugby

Brierton Lane

=== Round 4 ===
2 October 1993

Moseley	9 – 31	West Hartlepool

The Reddings

2 October 1993

Otley	9 – 5	Sale

Cross Green

2 October 1993

Rugby	7 – 5	London Scottish

Webb Ellis Road

2 October 1993

Wakefield	6 – 6	Nottingham

College Grove

2 October 1993

Waterloo	12 – 12	Saracens

St Anthony's Road

=== Round 5 ===
9 October 1993

London Scottish	16 – 8	Moseley

Athletic Ground

9 October 1993

Sale	16 – 3	Rugby

Heywood Road

9 October 1993

Saracens	13 – 3	Nottingham

Bramley Road

9 October 1993

Waterloo	39 – 16	Otley

St Anthony's Road

9 October 1993

West Hartlepool	13 – 13	Wakefield

Brierton Lane

=== Round 6 ===
13 November 1993

Moseley	9 – 3	Sale

The Reddings

13 November 1993

Nottingham	9 – 17	West Hartlepool

Ireland Avenue

13 November 1993

Otley	9 – 11	Saracens

Cross Green

13 November 1993

Rugby	3 – 8	Waterloo

Webb Ellis Road

13 November 1993

Wakefield	17 – 11	London Scottish

College Grove

=== Round 7 ===
20 November 1993

London Scottish	21 – 14	Nottingham

Athletic Ground

20 November 1993

Otley	3 – 3	Rugby

Cross Green

20 November 1993

Sale	11 – 11	Wakefield

Heywood Road

20 November 1993

Saracens	8 – 14	West Hartlepool

Bramley Road

20 November 1993

Waterloo	12 – 5	Moseley

St Anthony's Road

=== Round 8 ===
4 December 1993

Moseley	30 – 22	Otley

The Reddings

4 December 1993

Nottingham	9 – 30	Sale

Ireland Avenue

4 December 1993

Saracens	6 – 3	Rugby

Bramley Road

4 December 1993

Wakefield	47 – 6	Waterloo

College Grove

4 December 1993

West Hartlepool	21 – 19	London Scottish

Brierton Lane

=== Round 9 ===
11 December 1993

London Scottish	12 – 37	Saracens

Athletic Ground

11 December 1993

Otley	0 – 22	Wakefield

Cross Green

11 December 1993

Rugby	6 – 3	Moseley

Webb Ellis Road

11 December 1993

Sale	28 – 12	West Hartlepool

Heywood Road

11 December 1993

Waterloo	8 – 19	Nottingham

St Anthony's Road

=== Round 10 ===
8 January 1994

Moseley	15 – 16	Saracens

The Reddings

8 January 1994

Otley	12 – 18	Nottingham

Cross Green

8 January 1994

Rugby	16 – 12	Wakefield

Webb Ellis Road

8 January 1994

Sale	P – P	London Scottish

Heywood Road

- Postponed. Game rescheduled to 19 February 1994.

8 January 1994

Waterloo	15 – 25	West Hartlepool

St Anthony's Road

=== Round 11 ===
15 January 1994

London Scottish	9 – 18	Waterloo

Athletic Ground

15 January 1994

Nottingham	17 – 16	Rugby

Ireland Avenue

15 January 1994

Saracens	3 – 8	Sale

Bramley Road

15 January 1994

Wakefield	13 – 12	Moseley

College Grove

15 January 1994

West Hartlepool	48 – 20	Otley

Brierton Lane

=== Round 12 ===
29 January 1994

Moseley	17 – 0	Nottingham

The Reddings

29 January 1994

Otley	13 – 6	London Scottish

Cross Green

29 January 1994

Rugby	6 – 27	West Hartlepool

Webb Ellis Road

29 January 1994

Wakefield	14 – 23	Saracens

College Grove

29 January 1994

Waterloo	10 – 28	Sale

St Anthony's Road

=== Round 13 ===
12 February 1994

London Scottish	22 – 11	Rugby

Athletic Ground

12 February 1994

Nottingham	16 – 13	Wakefield

Ireland Avenue

12 February 1994

Sale	88 – 9	Otley

Heywood Road

12 February 1994

Saracens	37 – 0	Waterloo

Bramley Road

12 February 1994

West Hartlepool	16 – 15	Moseley

Brierton Lane

=== Round 10 (rescheduled game) ===
19 February 1994

Sale	19 – 12	London Scottish

Heywood Road

- Game rescheduled from 8 January 1994.

=== Round 14 ===
12 March 1994

Moseley	27 – 12	London Scottish

The Reddings

12 March 1994

Nottingham	18 – 9	Saracens

Ireland Avenue

12 March 1994

Otley	P – P	Waterloo

Cross Green

- Postponed. Game rescheduled to 12 April 1994.

12 March 1994

Rugby	8 – 21	Sale

Webb Ellis Road

12 March 1994

Wakefield	10 – 11	West Hartlepool

College Grove

=== Round 15 ===
26 March 1994

London Scottish	11 – 37	Wakefield

Athletic Ground

26 March 1994

Sale	13 – 16	Moseley

Heywood Road

26 March 1994

Saracens	31 – 19	Otley

Bramley Road

26 March 1994

Waterloo	19 – 17	Rugby

St Anthony's Road

26 March 1994

West Hartlepool	13 – 23	Nottingham

Brierton Lane

=== Round 16 ===
9 April 1994

Moseley	6 – 6	Waterloo

The Reddings

9 April 1994

Nottingham	23 – 18	London Scottish

Ireland Avenue

9 April 1994

Rugby	19 – 10	Otley

Webb Ellis Road

9 April 1994

Wakefield	19 – 28	Sale

College Grove

9 April 1994

West Hartlepool	22 – 20	Saracens

Brierton Lane

- West Hartlepool are promoted.

=== Round 14 (rescheduled game) ===
12 April 1994

Otley	15 – 21	Waterloo

Cross Green

- Game rescheduled from 12 March 1994.

=== Round 17 ===
23 April 1994

London Scottish	24 – 22	West Hartlepool

Athletic Ground

23 April 1994

Otley	12 – 26	Moseley

Cross Green

23 April 1994

Rugby	6 – 30	Saracens

Webb Ellis Road

23 April 1994

Sale	41 – 7	Nottingham

Heywood Road

- Sale are promoted.

23 April 1994

Waterloo	6 – 18	Wakefield

St Anthony's Road

=== Round 18 ===
30 April 1994

Moseley	13 – 11	Rugby

The Reddings

- Rugby are relegated.

30 April 1994

Nottingham	27 – 21	Waterloo

Ireland Avenue

30 April 1994

Saracens	6 – 11	London Scottish

Bramley Road

30 April 1994

Wakefield	26 – 14	Otley

College Grove

- Otley are relegated.

30 April 1994

West Hartlepool	11 – 11	Sale

Brierton Lane

- Sale are champions. Sale and West Hartlepool were both already promoted.

== See also ==
- 1993–94 National Division 1
- 1993–94 National Division 3
- 1993–94 National Division 4
- 1993–94 Courage League Division 5 North
- 1993–94 Courage League Division 5 South
