= Daren O'Leary =

English rugby union player

- Born: Daren Stephen O'Leary; 27 June 1973 (age 53) Harold Wood, England
- Height: 6 ft 0 in (1.83 m)
- Weight: 15 st 0 lb (95 kg)

Rugby union career
- Position: Wing
Senior career
Years	Team	Apps	(Points)
1991–1992	Saracens		
1992–2001	Harlequins	193	(559)
2001–2003	Gloucester	23	(25)
2004–2005	Worcester	15	(0)
–	Moseley		
–	Barbarian F.C.		

Daren O'Leary (born 27 June 1973 in Harold Wood, England) was a rugby union player who represented Saracens, Harlequins, Gloucester, Worcester and Moseley. Now retired, he is a professional rugby union agent with Top Marque Sports.

Whilst at Gloucester he started in the 2002 Zurich Championship Final (the year before winning the play-offs constituted winning the English title) in which Gloucester defeated Bristol.

O'Leary was part of the senior England squad for the 1993 Five Nations Championship and the 1997 England rugby union tour of Argentina and Australia, but was ultimately never capped at that level.
