= Sudbury RUFC =

English rugby union club, based in Suffolk

(England) Sudbury
- Full name: Sudbury Rugby Union Football Club
- Union: Eastern Counties Rugby Union
- Location: Sudbury, Suffolk, England
- Ground: Whittome Field
- League: Regional 1 South East
- 2025–26: 5th

Official website
- sudburyrfc.rfu.club

Sudbury Rugby Union Football Club is a rugby union club located in Great Cornard near Sudbury, Suffolk. The first XV currently play in Regional 1 South East, a fifth tier league in the English rugby union system.

== League history ==
When the league system was established in 1987, Sudbury was placed in the fourth tier, playing in 1987–88 Courage Area League South. The remained at this level until 1993–94 Courage League Division 4 when they were relegated after finishing bottom. Since then they have drifted down the leagues, ending up at level 8. In the mid 2010s the club won two consecutive promotions and now play at the 5th level.

== Honours ==
- 1992–93 Courage National 4 South champions
- London 2 North East/West promotion play-off winners (2): 2015–16, 2017–18
- London 3 North East champions: 2014–15
