= Kirkstall Training Ground =

Rugby training facility in Leeds, England

Coordinates: 53°48′51.5″N 1°36′16.7″W

- Batercard Leeds Rhinos Academy
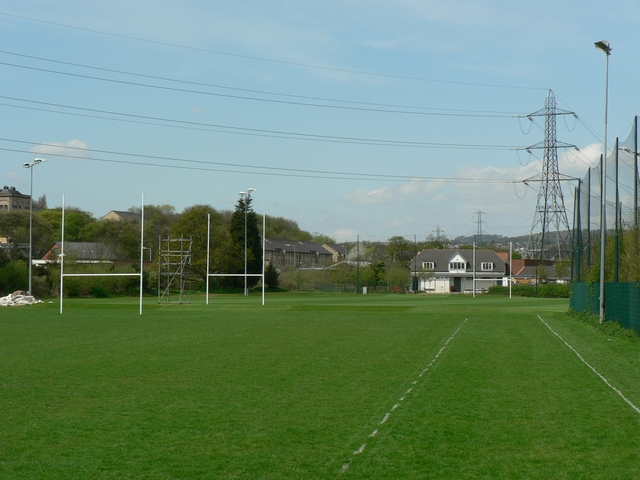
- Looking north across the pitch (2006)
- Interactive map of Kirkstall Training Ground
- Former names: Clarence Fields
- Location: Kirkstall, Leeds, West Yorkshire
- Owner: Leeds
- Type: Sports facility

Construction
- Opened: 1996 (as a training facility)

Tenants
- Rugby Union; Kirkstall RFC; Headingley; Rugby League; Bramley (1995-96); Milford (2017-)

The Kirkstall Training Ground, historically known as Clarence Fields, is a training facility in Leeds owned by Leeds Rhinos. The training facility is mostly used by Leeds Rhinos, but National Conference League side Milford and Leeds City College Rugby League team also use the site to play home matches. It was previously used by Leeds Tykes (having originally been the home of their predecessors Headingley RUFC), and by Bramley RLFC as their home ground in 1995-96 following the sale of McLaren Field.

The ground and the lower floors of the buildings on site suffered significant damage in the Boxing Day Floods of 2015. Whilst the ground was repaired and cleaned, the rugby teams used other venues around the city. Leeds Rhinos Chief Executive, Gary Hetherington, suggested that the eventual clean up cost would be £6 million and it would not be until June 2016 at the earliest before the training centre could be used again.

== Headingley RUFC ==
While Headingley RUFC were playing in the Courage Leagues in the early 1990s, the ground capacity of the then Clarence Fields was listed as 7,850, with 850 seated in two stands and around 7,000 standing, and there was a club house with two bars, six changing rooms and floodlights around the pitch. The modern day ground still retains the club house and changing rooms, and although there are three full size pitches with floodlighting, there are no longer any covered stands with seating and standing room is drastically reduced.
