= National Division 5 =

English rugby union competition

Courage League Division 5
- Sport: Rugby union
- Founded: 1993
- Folded: 1996
- No. of teams: 26 (13 North, 13 South)
- Countries: England

National Division 5 (sponsored by Courage Brewery) was a short lived English rugby union competition created as a tier 5 regional competition divided into National Division 5 North and National Division 5 South. In 1993 the RFU decided to change the whole league structure, with a new national league (National Division 4) replacing the old North / South regional system which would become the aforementioned National Division 5. This led to twelve out of thirteen teams in both National Division 4 regions dropping into National Division 5 while the league winners joined National Division 4 along with eight teams from National Division 3. This system continued to the end of the 1995–96 season when the league was restructured once again – with National Division 4 being abolished as a national competition reverting to the old system only being renamed as National League 4 North and National League 4 South.

== Original league composition 1993–94 ==
National Division 5 – North

- Birmingham & Solihull (promoted from Midlands 1)
- Bradford & Bingley (promoted from North 1)
- Durham City (relegated from 1992–93 Courage National 4 North)
- Hereford (relegated from 1992–93 Courage National 4 North)
- Kendal (relegated from 1992–93 Courage National 4 North)
- Lichfield (relegated from 1992–93 Courage National 4 North)
- Nuneaton (relegated from 1992–93 Courage National 4 North)
- Preston Grasshoppers (relegated from 1992–93 Courage National 4 North)
- Rotherham (relegated from 1992–93 Courage National 4 North)
- Stoke-on-Trent (relegated from 1992–93 Courage National 4 North)
- Stourbridge (relegated from 1992–93 Courage National 4 North)
- Walsall (relegated from 1992–93 Courage National 4 North)
- Winnington Park (relegated from 1992–93 Courage National 4 North)

National Division 5 – South

- Basingstoke (relegated from 1992–93 Courage National 4 South)
- Berry Hill (relegated from 1992–93 Courage National 4 South)
- Camborne (relegated from 1992–93 Courage National 4 South)
- High Wycombe (relegated from 1992–93 Courage National 4 South)
- London Welsh (relegated from 1992–93 Courage National 4 South)
- Lydney (relegated from 1992–93 Courage National 4 South)
- Maidstone (relegated from 1992–93 Courage National 4 South)
- Metropolitan Police (relegated from 1992–93 Courage National 4 South)
- North Walsham (relegated from 1992–93 Courage National 4 South)
- Reading (promoted from South West 1)
- Southend (relegated from 1992–93 Courage National 4 South)
- Tabard (promoted from London 1)
- Weston-super-Mare (relegated from 1992–93 Courage National 4 South)

== Courage Division 5 North honours ==
List of Courage Division 5 North Honours
Season	No of teams	Champions	Runners–up	Relegated Teams	League Name
1993–94	13	Rotherham	Preston Grasshoppers	Durham City and Bradford & Bingley	Courage Division 5 North
1994–95	13	Walsall	Kendal	Barkers Butts and Hereford	Courage Division 5 North
1995–96	13	Wharfedale	Worcester (and 11 others) (Note: By the end of this season there was another league restructure with Courage Division 4 being abolished and Courage Division 5 North reverting to a tier 4 regional competition named National League 4 North. 12 teams from Courage 5 North would join 2 teams from lower leagues (Hereford & Manchester) to form the new 14 team north division while the champions Wharfedale went into Division 3.)	Broughton Park	Courage Division 5 North
Green backgrounds are promotion places.

== Courage Division 5 South honours ==
List of Courage Division 5 South Honours
Season	No of teams	Champions	Runners–up	Relegated Teams	League Name
1993–94	13	Reading	Lydney	Maidstone and Southend	Courage Division 5 South
1994–95	13	London Welsh	Lydney	Sudbury and Basingstoke	Courage Division 5 South
1995–96	13	Lydney	Weston-super-Mare (and 11 others) (Note: By the end of this season there was another league restructure with Courage Division 4 being abolished and Courage Division 5 South reverting to a tier 4 regional competition named National League 4 South. 12 teams from Courage 5 North South would join 2 teams from lower leagues (Charlton Park & Newbury) to form the new 14 team south division while the champions Lydney went into Division 3.)	Camborne	Courage Division 5 South
Green backgrounds are promotion places.

== See also ==
- English rugby union system
