= 2001–02 National Division One =

Rugby union competition in England

- Countries: England
- Champions: Rotherham
- Runners-up: Worcester
- Relegated: Henley Hawks and Bracknell
- Attendance: 168,490 (average 931 per match) (Note: Note that 1 home attendance is missing (see below) - so the total attendance will not be 100% accurate. The average attendance has also been taken into account with the missing games not included.)
- Highest attendance: 4,800 Worcester at home to Rotherham on 22 September 2001
- Lowest attendance: 150 (x2) Bracknell at home to Exeter Chiefs on 2 March 2002 & Moseley at home to Rugby Lions on 23 March 2002
- Top point scorer: (England) Simon Binns (Otley) 283 Points
- Top try scorer: (Australia) Chris Garrard (Worcester) 25 tries

The 2001–02 National Division One (known as the Jewson National Division One for sponsorship reasons) was the 15th full season of rugby union within the second tier of the English league system, currently known as the RFU Championship. New teams to the division included Rotherham who had been relegated from the Zurich Premiership 2000–01 while Bracknell and Rugby Lions had been promoted from the 2000–01 National Division Two.

For the first time the team finishing first, Rotherham, were denied promotion to the Zurich Premiership for season 2002–03 because their ground was not of the required standard - this was the first time a team had been denied entry to the top flight of English rugby since the leagues started in 1987 due to the introduction of the controversial 'minimum standards' rule for clubs seeking to join the Premiership. Worcester were runners-up for the second consecutive season, and Henley Hawks and Bracknell were relegated to the 2002–03 National Division Two with Bracknell spending just one season in the division.

== Participating teams ==
Locations of the 2001–02 National Division One teams

Team	Stadium	Capacity	City/Area
Bedford Blues	Goldington Road	5,000	Bedford, Bedfordshire
Birmingham & Solihull	Sharmans Cross	4,000	Solihull, West Midlands
Bracknell	Lily Hill Park	1,250 (250 seats) (Note: Bracknell would build a 250 seater stand for this season, improving capacity from 1,000 to 1,250.)	Bracknell, Berkshire
Coventry	Coundon Road	10,000 (1,100 seats)	Coventry, West Midlands
Exeter Chiefs	County Ground	5,750 (750 seats)	Exeter, Devon
Henley Hawks	Dry Leas	4,000	Henley-on-Thames, Oxfordshire
London Welsh	Old Deer Park	4,500 (1,500 seats)	Richmond, London
Manchester	Grove Park	4,000	Cheadle Hulme, Greater Manchester
Moseley	Bournbrook		Birmingham, West Midlands
Otley	Cross Green	7,000 (852 seats)	Otley, West Yorkshire
Rotherham	Clifton Lane	2,500	Rotherham, South Yorkshire
Rugby Lions	Webb Ellis Road	3,200 (200 seats)	Rugby, Warwickshire
Wakefield	College Grove	4,000 (500 seats)	Wakefield, West Yorkshire
Worcester	Sixways	8,477	Worcester, Worcestershire

== Table ==
2001–02 National Division One table
Pos	Team	Pld	W	D	L	PF	PA	PD	TB	LB	Pts	Qualification
1	Rotherham (C)	26	24	0	2	1099	325	+774	22	2	120	
2	Worcester	26	23	0	3	941	364	+577	16	0	108	
3	Exeter Chiefs	26	19	1	6	707	448	+259	13	1	92	
4	Coventry	26	16	3	7	730	559	+171	8	4	82	
5	London Welsh	26	15	0	11	580	557	+23	5	4	69	
6	Bedford Blues	26	12	3	11	654	600	+54	8	6	68	
7	Otley	26	11	1	14	601	675	−74	6	4	56	
8	Birmingham & Solihull	26	10	1	15	432	626	−194	4	6	52	
9	Wakefield	26	9	2	15	514	607	−93	4	3	47	
10	Rugby Lions	26	9	1	16	518	668	−150	4	5	47	
11	Moseley	26	9	1	16	448	695	−247	5	3	46	
12	Manchester	26	8	0	18	381	758	−377	1	3	36	
13	Henley Hawks	26	6	1	19	449	767	−318	2	5	33	Relegated
14	Bracknell	26	4	0	22	418	823	−405	3	7	26	Relegated

Source: rugbyarchive.net
Rules for classification: Points are awarded as follows: four points for a win; two points for a draw; no points for a loss; one bonus point for scoring four tries or more in a match; one bonus point for losing by seven points or less.
- If teams are level at any stage, tiebreakers are applied in the following order: (1) difference between points for and against; (2) total number of points for.
There was no promotion this season.
(C) Champion

== Results ==
=== Round 1 ===
1 September 2001

Birmingham & Solihull	17 - 21	Coventry
	Report

Sharmans Cross
Attendance: 800
Referee: Martin Fox

1 September 2001

Exeter Chiefs	33 - 30	Bracknell
	Report

County Ground
Attendance: 950
Referee: Geraint Ashton-Jones

1 September 2001

Henley Hawks	9 - 24	London Welsh
	Report

Dry Leas
Attendance: 1,150
Referee: David Grashoff

1 September 2001

Moseley	16 - 39	Otley
	Report

Bournbrook
Attendance: 250
Referee: Ashley Rowden

1 September 2001

Rugby Lions	32 - 32	Bedford Blues
	Report

Webb Ellis Road
Attendance: 620
Referee: R Glynne Jones

1 September 2001

Wakefield	22 - 34	Rotherham
	Report

College Grove
Attendance: 1,100
Referee: Stuart Piercy

1 September 2001

Worcester	45 - 11	Manchester
	Report

Sixways
Referee: Trevor Fisher

=== Round 2 ===
8 September 2001

Bedford Blues	36 - 27	Exeter Chiefs
	Report

Goldington Road
Attendance: 1,323
Referee: Steve Savage

8 September 2001

Bracknell	20 - 11	Moseley
	Report

Lily Hill Park
Attendance: 750
Referee: Nick Cousins

8 September 2001

Coventry	24 - 8	Henley Hawks
	Report

Coundon Road
Attendance: 1,000
Referee: Eric Woodmason

8 September 2001

Otley	8 - 21	Manchester
	Report

Cross Green
Attendance: 620
Referee: Mark Wilson

8 September 2001

Rugby Lions	18-6	Wakefield
	Report

Webb Ellis Road
Attendance: 620
Referee: Tim Miller

8 September 2001

Worcester	53 - 3	Birmingham & Solihull
	Report

Sixways
Attendance: 2,123
Referee: J Barnard

9 September 2001

London Welsh	6 - 28	Rotherham
	Report

Old Deer Park
Attendance: 1,200
Referee: S Terheege

=== Round 3 ===
15 September 2001

Birmingham & Solihull	41 - 16	Otley
	Report

Sharmans Cross
Attendance: 500
Referee: Trevor Fisher

15 September 2001

Exeter Chiefs	20 - 15	Rugby Lions
	Report

County Ground
Attendance: 810
Referee: Roy Maybank

15 September 2001

Henley Hawks	0-31	Worcester
	Report

Dry Leas
Attendance: 950
Referee: S Terheege

15 September 2001

Manchester	28 - 13	Bracknell
	Report

Grove Park
Attendance: 750
Referee: Martin Fox

15 September 2001

Moseley	46 - 45	Bedford Blues
	Report

Bournbrook
Attendance: 702
Referee: David Sainsbury

15 September 2001

Rotherham	55 - 9	Coventry
	Report

Clifton Lane
Attendance: 1,100
Referee: Geraint Ashton-Jones

15 September 2001

Wakefield	18 - 21	London Welsh
	Report

College Grove
Attendance: 350
Referee: David Pearson

=== Round 4 ===
22 September 2001

Bedford Blues	21 - 10	Manchester
	Report

Goldington Road
Attendance: 1,477
Referee: Nick Cousins

22 September 2001

Bracknell	12 - 19	Birmingham & Solihull
	Report

Lily Hill Park
Attendance: 300
Referee: Steve Savage

22 September 2001

Coventry	19 - 23	London Welsh
	Report

Coundon Road
Attendance: 1,100
Referee: Tim Miller

22 September 2001

Exeter Chiefs	39 - 3	Wakefield
	Report

County Ground
Attendance: 640
Referee: David Grashoff

22 September 2001

Otley	55 - 13	Henley Hawks
	Report

Cross Green
Attendance: 450
Referee: Martin Fox

22 September 2001

Rugby Lions	28 - 19	Moseley
	Report

Webb Ellis Road
Attendance: 450
Referee: Eric Woodmason

22 September 2001

Worcester	20 - 18	Rotherham
	Report

Sixways
Attendance: 4,800
Referee: Nigel Yates

=== Round 5 ===
29 September 2001

Birmingham & Solihull	19 - 19	Bedford Blues
	Report

Sharmans Cross
Attendance: 500

29 September 2001

Henley Hawks	24 - 26	Bracknell
	Report

Dry Leas
Attendance: 1,000
Referee: D May

29 September 2001

London Welsh	3 - 21	Worcester
	Report

Old Deer Park
Attendance: 1,400
Referee: Geraint Ashton-Jones

29 September 2001

Manchester	22-14	Rugby Lions
	Report

Grove Park
Attendance: 685
Referee: Steve Savage

29 September 2001

Moseley	6 - 21	Exeter Chiefs
	Report

Bournbrook
Attendance: 350
Referee: Mark Wilson

29 September 2001

Rotherham	55 - 6	Otley
	Report

Clifton Lane
Attendance: 1,551
Referee: David Sainsbury

29 September 2001

Wakefield	20 - 20	Coventry
	Report

College Grove
Attendance: 350
Referee: Trevor Fisher

=== Round 6 ===
6 October 2001

Bedford Blues	44 - 9	Henley Hawks
	Report

Goldington Road
Attendance: 1,182
Referee: Nigel Yates

6 October 2001

Bracknell	10 - 42	Rotherham
	Report

Lily Hill Park
Attendance: 300
Referee: Ashley Rowden

6 October 2001

Exeter Chiefs	16 - 3	Manchester
	Report

County Ground
Attendance: 640
Referee: Eric Woodmason

6 October 2001

Moseley	31 - 23	Wakefield
	Report

Bournbrook
Attendance: 400
Referee: Wayne Barnes

6 October 2001

Otley	32 - 9	London Welsh
	Report

Cross Green
Attendance: 600
Referee: Mark Wilson

6 October 2001

Rugby Lions	6 - 22	Birmingham & Solihull
	Report

Webb Ellis Road
Attendance: 320
Referee: David Grashoff

6 October 2001

Worcester	22 - 31	Coventry
	Report

Sixways
Attendance: 2,250
Referee: Robin Goodliffe

=== Round 7 ===
20 October 2001

Birmingham & Solihull	22 - 26	Exeter Chiefs
	Report

Sharmans Cross
Attendance: 300

20 October 2001

Coventry	47 - 41	Otley
	Report

Coundon Road
Attendance: 1,150
Referee: Geraint Ashton-Jones

20 October 2001

Henley Hawks	15 - 12	Rugby Lions
	Report

Dry Leas
Attendance: 300
Referee: Ashley Rowden

20 October 2001

London Welsh	44 - 20	Bracknell
	Report

Old Deer Park
Attendance: 730
Referee: Robin Goodliffe

20 October 2001

Manchester	6 - 15	Moseley
	Report

Grove Park
Attendance: 465
Referee: Martin Fisher

20 October 2001

Rotherham	53 - 13	Bedford Blues
	Report

Clifton Lane
Attendance: 1,100
Referee: Martin Fox

20 October 2001

Wakefield	8 - 39	Worcester
	Report

College Grove
Attendance: 350
Referee: Tim Miller

=== Round 8 ===
27 October 2001

Bedford Blues	P - P	London Welsh

- Postponed. Rescheduled for 24 November 2001.

27 October 2001

Bracknell	9 - 8	Coventry
	Report

Lily Hill Park
Attendance: 400
Referee: Nigel Yates

27 October 2001

Exeter Chiefs	P - P	Henley Hawks

- Postponed. Rescheduled for 16 February 2002.

27 October 2001

Manchester	P - P	Wakefield

- Postponed. Rescheduled for 15 December 2001.

27 October 2001

Moseley	6 - 15	Birmingham & Solihull
	Report

Bournbrook
Attendance: 717
Referee: Nick Cousins

27 October 2001

Otley	23 - 40	Worcester
	Report

Cross Green
Attendance: 750
Referee: David Grashoff

27 October 2001

Rugby Lions	P - P	Rotherham

- Postponed. Rescheduled for 15 February 2002.

=== Round 9 ===
10 November 2001

Birmingham & Solihull	27 - 8	Manchester
	Report

Sharmans Cross
Attendance: 200
Referee: David Grashoff

10 November 2001

Coventry	15 - 15	Bedford Blues
	Report

Coundon Road
Attendance: 1,000
Referee: Tim Miller

10 November 2001

Henley Hawks	24 - 29	Moseley
	Report

Dry Leas
Attendance: 350

10 November 2001

Rotherham	13 - 19	Exeter Chiefs
	Report

Clifton Lane
Attendance: 1,100
Referee: Nigel Yates

10 November 2001

Wakefield	29 - 22	Otley
	Report

College Grove
Attendance: 300
Referee: Wayne Barnes

11 November 2001

London Welsh	37 - 15	Rugby Lions
	Report

Old Deer Park
Attendance: 730

11 November 2001

Worcester	32 - 6	Bracknell
	Report

Sixways
Attendance: 2,104

=== Round 10 ===
17 November 2001

Bedford Blues	11 - 20	Worcester
	Report

Goldington Road
Attendance: 1,410
Referee: Nigel Yates

17 November 2001

Birmingham & Solihull	18 - 22	Wakefield
	Report

Sharmans Cross
Attendance: 200
Referee: Tim Fisher

17 November 2001

Bracknell	19 - 25	Otley
	Report

Lily Hill Park
Attendance: 180
Referee: Rob Debney

17 November 2001

Exeter Chiefs	52 - 22	London Welsh
	Report

County Ground
Attendance: 822
Referee: Geraint Ashton-Jones

17 November 2001

Manchester	25 - 26	Henley Hawks
	Report

Grove Park
Attendance: 400
Referee: Nick Cousins

17 November 2001

Moseley	3 - 47	Rotherham
	Report

Bournbrook
Attendance: 490
Referee: Ashley Rowden

17 November 2001

Rugby Lions	22 - 27	Coventry
	Report

Webb Ellis Road
Attendance: 836
Referee: Wayne Barnes

=== Round 8 (rescheduled game) ===
24 November 2001

Bedford Blues	39 - 27	London Welsh
	Report

Goldington Road
Attendance: 956
Referee: Rob Debney

- Game rescheduled from 27 October 2001.

=== Round 11 ===
1 December 2001

Coventry	16 - 15	Exeter Chiefs
	Report

Coundon Road
Attendance: 2,000
Referee: Mark Wilson

1 December 2001

Henley Hawks	20 - 26	Birmingham & Solihull
	Report

Dry Leas
Attendance: 300
Referee: Rob Debney

1 December 2001

London Welsh	18 - 29	Moseley
	Report

Old Deer Park
Attendance: 840

1 December 2001

Otley	26 - 10	Bedford Blues
	Report

Cross Green
Attendance: 700
Referee: Trevor Fisher

1 December 2001

Rotherham	55 - 10	Manchester
	Report

Clifton Lane
Attendance: 1,000
Referee: Geraint Ashton-Jones

1 December 2001

Wakefield	33 - 22	Bracknell
	Report

College Grove
Attendance: 300
Referee: Nick Cousins

1 December 2001

Worcester	30 - 5	Rugby Lions
	Report

Sixways
Attendance: 1,834
Referee: Tim Miller

=== Round 12 ===
8 December 2001

Bedford Blues	27 - 10	Bracknell
	Report

Goldington Road
Attendance: 1,301
Referee: Wayne Barnes

8 December 2001

Birmingham & Solihull	16 - 56	Rotherham
	Report

Sharmans Cross
Attendance: 850
Referee: Martin Fox

8 December 2001

Exeter Chiefs	21 - 10	Worcester
	Report

County Ground
Attendance: 1,520
Referee: S Leyshon

8 December 2001

Henley Hawks	20 - 13	Wakefield
	Report

Dry Leas
Attendance: 550
Referee: Geraint Ashton-Jones

8 December 2001

Manchester	12 - 11	London Welsh
	Report

Grove Park
Attendance: 425
Referee: David Sainsbury

8 December 2001

Moseley	6 - 25	Coventry
	Report

Bournbrook
Attendance: 726
Referee: Trevor Fisher

8 December 2001

Rugby Lions	25 - 19	Otley
	Report

Webb Ellis Road
Attendance: 500
Referee: David Grashoff

=== Round 8 (rescheduled game) ===
15 December 2001

Manchester	27 - 16	Wakefield
	Report

Grove Park
Attendance: 381
Referee: Wayne Barnes

- Game rescheduled from 27 October 2001.

=== Round 13 ===
29 December 2001

Bracknell	23 - 35	Rugby Lions
	Report

Lily Hill Park
Attendance: 475
Referee: S Terheege

29 December 2001

Coventry	47 - 13	Manchester
	Report

Coundon Road
Attendance: 1,576
Referee: David Sainsbury

29 December 2001

London Welsh	28 - 25	Birmingham & Solihull
	Report

Old Deer Park
Attendance: 930
Referee: Steve Savage

29 December 2001

Otley	26 - 5	Exeter Chiefs
	Report

Cross Green
Attendance: 960
Referee: Tim Miller

29 December 2001

Rotherham	48 - 6	Henley Hawks
	Report

Clifton Lane
Attendance: 1,100
Referee: David Grashoff

29 December 2001

Wakefield	18 - 16	Bedford Blues
	Report

College Grove
Attendance: 300
Referee: Martin Fox

29 December 2001

Worcester	33 - 12	Moseley
	Report

Sixways
Attendance: 3,323
Referee: Trevor Fisher

=== Round 14 ===
5 January 2002

Bedford Blues	P - P	Rugby Lions

- Game rescheduled to 2 March 2002.

5 January 2002

Bracknell	P - P	Exeter Chiefs

- Game rescheduled to 2 March 2002.

5 January 2002

Coventry	P - P	Birmingham & Solihull

- Game rescheduled to 17 February 2002.

5 January 2002

London Welsh	P - P	Henley Hawks

- Game rescheduled to 2 March 2002.

5 January 2002

Manchester	P - P	Worcester

- Game rescheduled to 16 February 2002.

5 January 2002

Otley	P - P	Moseley

- Game rescheduled to 2 March 2002.

5 January 2002

Rotherham	P - P	Wakefield

- Game rescheduled to 2 March 2002.

=== Round 15 ===
12 January 2002

Birmingham & Solihull	13 - 30	Worcester
	Report

Sharmans Cross
Attendance: 1,000
Referee: Ashley Rowden

12 January 2002

Exeter Chiefs	18 - 13	Bedford Blues
	Report

County Ground
Attendance: 1,158
Referee: Tim Miller

12 January 2002

Henley Hawks	18 - 22	Coventry
	Report

Dry Leas
Attendance: 700
Referee: Martin Fox

12 January 2002

Manchester	20 - 3	Otley
	Report

Grove Park
Attendance: 485
Referee: Nick Cousins

12 January 2002

Moseley	25 - 23	Bracknell
	Report

Bournbrook
Attendance: 300

12 January 2002

Rotherham	28 - 21	London Welsh
	Report

Clifton Lane
Attendance: 1,200
Referee: Wayne Barnes

12 January 2002

Wakefield	16 - 18	Rugby Lions
	Report

College Grove
Attendance: 300
Referee: Trevor Fisher

=== Round 16 ===
19 January 2002

Bedford Blues	36 - 25	Moseley
	Report

Goldington Road
Attendance: 1,486
Referee: Nigel Yates

19 January 2002

Bracknell	15 - 22	Manchester
	Report

Lily Hill Park
Attendance: 300
Referee: Martin Fox

19 January 2002

Coventry	28 - 41	Rotherham
	Report

Coundon Road
Attendance: 4,132
Referee: J Barnard

19 January 2002

London Welsh	16 - 8	Wakefield
	Report

Old Deer Park
Attendance: 750
Referee: Mark Wilson

19 January 2002

Otley	18 - 3	Birmingham & Solihull
	Report

Cross Green
Attendance: 500
Referee: Wayne Barnes

19 January 2002

Rugby Lions	10 - 34	Exeter Chiefs
	Report

Webb Ellis Road
Attendance: 420
Referee: David Grashoff

19 January 2002

Worcester	66 - 17	Henley Hawks
	Report

Sixways
Attendance: 2,055
Referee: Robin Goodliffe

=== Round 17 ===
26 January 2002

Birmingham & Solihull	10 - 3	Bracknell
	Report

Sharmans Cross
Attendance: 200
Referee: Mark Wilson

26 January 2002

Henley Hawks	12 - 22	Otley
	Report

Dry Leas
Attendance: 350
Referee: Tim Miller

26 January 2002

London Welsh	19 - 5	Coventry
	Report

Old Deer Park
Attendance: 700
Referee: Geraint Ashton-Jones

26 January 2002

Manchester	12 - 24	Bedford Blues
	Report

Grove Park
Attendance: 550
Referee: J Barnard

26 January 2002

Moseley	P - P	Rugby Lions

- Postponed. Game rescheduled to 23 March 2002.

26 January 2002

Rotherham	18 - 8	Worcester
	Report

Clifton Lane
Attendance: 2,500
Referee: David Pearson

26 January 2002

Wakefield	15 - 27	Exeter Chiefs
	Report

College Grove
Attendance: 300
Referee: Ashley Rowden

=== Round 18 ===
2 February 2002

Bedford Blues	23 - 10	Birmingham & Solihull
	Report

Goldington Road
Attendance: 1,272
Referee: Robin Goodliffe

2 February 2002

Coventry	37 - 19	Wakefield
	Report

Coundon Road
Attendance: 2,043
Referee: Tony Spreadbury

2 February 2002

Exeter Chiefs	28 - 7	Moseley
	Report

County Ground
Attendance: 750
Referee: Martin Fox

2 February 2002

Otley	9 - 18	Rotherham
	Report

Cross Green
Attendance: 1,500
Referee: Ashley Rowden

2 February 2002

Rugby Lions	25 - 13	Manchester
	Report

Webb Ellis Road
Attendance: 300
Referee: Geraint Ashton-Jones

2 February 2002

Worcester	10 - 6	London Welsh
	Report

Sixways
Attendance: 1,448
Referee: Chris White

3 February 2002

Bracknell	13 - 6	Henley Hawks
	Report

Lily Hill Park
Attendance: 600
Referee: J Barnard

=== Round 19 ===
9 February 2002

Birmingham & Solihull	13 - 11	Rugby Lions
	Report

Sharmans Cross
Attendance: 400

9 February 2002

Coventry	26 - 33	Worcester
	Report

Coundon Road
Attendance: 3,475
Referee: Nigel Yates

9 February 2002

Henley Hawks	25 - 37	Bedford Blues
	Report

Dry Leas
Attendance: 1,200
Referee: Mark Wilson

9 February 2002

London Welsh	34 - 15	Otley
	Report

Old Deer Park
Attendance: 650
Referee: David Sainsbury

9 February 2002

Manchester	P - P	Exeter Chiefs

- Postponed. Game rescheduled to 23 March 2002.

9 February 2002

Rotherham	55 - 8	Bracknell
	Report

Clifton Lane
Attendance: 1,500
Referee: Trevor Fisher

9 February 2002

Wakefield	17 - 15	Moseley
	Report

College Grove
Attendance: 350
Referee: Peter Marshall

=== Rounds 8 & 14 (rescheduled games) ===
15 February 2002

Rugby Lions	14 - 47	Rotherham
	Report

Webb Ellis Road
Attendance: 300
Referee: Nigel Yates

- Game rescheduled from 27 October 2001.

16 February 2002

Exeter Chiefs	43 - 23	Henley Hawks
	Report

Dry Leas
Attendance: 487
Referee: Nigel Higginson

- Game rescheduled from 27 October 2001.

16 February 2002

Manchester	17 - 62	Worcester
	Report

Grove Park
Attendance: 225
Referee: David Sainsbury

- Game rescheduled from 5 January 2002.

17 February 2002

Coventry	46 - 13	Birmingham & Solihull
	Report

Coundon Road
Attendance: 924
Referee: Trevor Fisher

- Game rescheduled from 5 January 2002.

=== Round 20 ===
23 February 2002

Bedford Blues	31 - 36	Rotherham
	Report

Goldington Road
Attendance: 1,908
Referee: Geraint Ashton-Jones

23 February 2002

Bracknell	22 - 24	London Welsh
	Report

Lily Hill Park
Attendance: 600
Referee: Wayne Barnes

23 February 2002

Exeter Chiefs	35 - 10	Birmingham & Solihull
	Report

County Ground
Attendance: 935
Referee: S Terheege

23 February 2002

Moseley	32 - 6	Manchester
	Report

Bournbrook
Attendance: 359
Referee: Tim Miller

23 February 2002

Otley	11 - 22	Coventry
	Report

Cross Green
Attendance: 600
Referee: Rob Debney

23 February 2002

Rugby Lions	25 - 13	Henley Hawks
	Report

Webb Ellis Road
Attendance: 350
Referee: David Rose

23 February 2002

Worcester	36 - 8	Wakefield
	Report

Sixways
Attendance: 1,811
Referee: J Barnard

=== Round 14 (rescheduled games) ===
1 March 2002

Bedford Blues	25 - 15	Rugby Lions
	Report

Goldington Road
Attendance: 1,482
Referee: Martin Fox

- Game rescheduled from 5 January 2002.

2 March 2002

Bracknell	6 - 27	Exeter Chiefs
	Report

Lily Hill Park
Attendance: 150
Referee: David Rose

- Game rescheduled from 5 January 2002.

2 March 2002

London Welsh	33 - 20	Henley Hawks
	Report

Old Deer Park
Attendance: 400
Referee: Robin Goodliffe

- Game rescheduled from 5 January 2002.

2 March 2002

Otley	19 - 19	Moseley
	Report

Cross Green
Attendance: 430
Referee: J Barnard

- Game rescheduled from 5 January 2002.

2 March 2002

Rotherham	30 - 8	Wakefield
	Report

Clifton Lane
Attendance: 1,200
Referee: Tony Spreadbury

- Game rescheduled from 5 January 2002.

=== Round 21 ===
9 March 2002

Birmingham & Solihull	14 - 10	Moseley
	Report

Sharmans Cross
Attendance: 700
Referee: Nigel Yates

9 March 2002

Coventry	63 - 14	Bracknell
	Report

Coundon Road
Attendance: 1,923
Referee: Mark Wilson

9 March 2002

Henley Hawks	28 - 19	Exeter Chiefs
	Report

Dry Leas
Attendance: 550
Referee: David Sainsbury

9 March 2002

London Welsh	26 - 20	Bedford Blues
	Report

Old Deer Park
Attendance: 1,300
Referee: Trevor Fisher

9 March 2002

Rotherham	30 - 8	Rugby Lions
	Report

Clifton Lane
Attendance: 1,500
Referee: Roy Maybank

9 March 2002

Wakefield	56 - 10	Manchester
	Report

College Grove
Attendance: 350

9 March 2002

Worcester	71 - 14	Otley
	Report

Sixways
Attendance: 1,750
Referee: David Pearson

=== Round 22 ===
16 March 2002

Bracknell	24 - 59	Worcester
	Report

Lily Hill Park
Attendance: 350
Referee: Nigel Yates

16 March 2002

Bedford Blues	29 - 24	Coventry
	Report

Goldington Road
Attendance: 1,732
Referee: Andrew Cole

16 March 2002

Exeter Chiefs	23 - 32	Rotherham
	Report

County Ground
Attendance: 1,530
Referee: Ashley Rowden

16 March 2002

Manchester	16 - 11	Birmingham & Solihull
	Report

Grove Park
Attendance: 567
Referee: David Rose

16 March 2002

Moseley	21 - 26	Henley Hawks
	Report

Bournbrook
Attendance: 300
Referee: David Grashoff

16 March 2002

Otley	45 - 33	Wakefield
	Report

Cross Green
Attendance: 740
Referee: Martin Fox

16 March 2002

Rugby Lions	20 - 41	London Welsh
	Report

Webb Ellis Park
Attendance: 475
Referee: Geraint Ashton-Jones

=== Round 17 & 19 (rescheduled games) ===
23 March 2002

Moseley	17 - 12	Rugby Lions
	Report

Bournbrook
Attendance: 150
Referee: Robin Goodliffe

- Game rescheduled from 26 January 2002.

23 March 2002

Manchester	5 - 53	Exeter Chiefs
	Report

Grove Park
Attendance: 250
Referee: Rob Debney

- Game rescheduled from 9 February 2002.

=== Round 23 ===
30 March 2002

Coventry	47 - 25	Rugby Lions
	Report

Coundon Road
Attendance: 2,195
Referee: David Rose

30 March 2002

Henley Hawks	45 - 20	Manchester
	Report

Dry Leas
Attendance: 850
Referee: S Terheege

30 March 2002

London Welsh	19 - 34	Exeter Chiefs
	Report

Old Deer Park
Attendance: 1,020
Referee: Wayne Barnes

30 March 2002

Rotherham	61 - 0	Moseley
	Report

Clifton Lane
Attendance: 2,000
Referee: Martin Fox

30 March 2002

Wakefield	26 - 17	Birmingham & Solihull
	Report

College Grove
Attendance: 250
Referee: Tim Miller

30 March 2002

Worcester	46 - 22	Bedford Blues
	Report

Sixways
Attendance: 2,296
Referee: Eric Woodmason

31 March 2002

Otley	39 - 28	Bracknell
	Report

Cross Green
Attendance: 550
Referee: Mike Hamlin

=== Round 24 ===
6 April 2002

Bedford Blues	17 - 22	Otley
	Report

Goldington Road
Attendance: 1,315
Referee: Rob Debney

6 April 2002

Birmingham & Solihull	22 - 9	Henley Hawks
	Report

Sharmans Cross
Attendance: 200
Referee: Nigel Yates

6 April 2002

Bracknell	8 - 42	Wakefield
	Report

Lily Hill Park
Attendance: 300
Referee: S Leyshon

6 April 2002

Exeter Chiefs	23 - 23	Coventry
	Report

County Ground
Attendance: 952
Referee: Geraint Ashton-Jones

6 April 2002

Manchester	7 - 72	Rotherham
	Report

Grove Park
Attendance: 828
Referee: Ashley Rowden

6 April 2002

Moseley	17 - 15	London Welsh
	Report

Bournbrook
Attendance: 400
Referee: Mark Wilson

6 April 2002

Rugby Lions	23 - 41	Worcester
	Report

Webb Ellis Road
Attendance: 700
Referee: David Pearson

=== Round 25 ===
13 April 2002

Bracknell	7 - 41	Bedford Blues
	Report

Lily Hill Park
Attendance: 400
Referee: Tim Miller

13 April 2002

Coventry	52 - 24	Moseley
	Report

Coundon Road
Attendance: 2,200
Referee: David Sainsbury

13 April 2002

London Welsh	20 - 13	Manchester
	Report

Old Deer Park
Attendance: 900
Referee: David Rose

13 April 2002

Otley	32 - 36	Rugby Lions
	Report

Cross Green
Attendance: 900
Referee: Wayne Barnes

13 April 2002

Rotherham	73 - 0	Birmingham & Solihull
	Report

Clifton Lane
Attendance: 1,500
Referee: Rob Debney

13 April 2002

Wakefield	13 - 13	Henley Hawks
	Report

College Grove
Attendance: 250
Referee: David Grashoff

13 April 2002

Worcester	41 - 17	Exeter Chiefs
	Report

Sixways
Attendance: 2,721
Referee: Martin Fox

=== Round 26 ===
27 April 2002

Bedford Blues	18 - 22	Wakefield
	Report

Goldington Road
Attendance: 1,601
Referee: Geraint Ashton-Jones

27 April 2002

Birmingham & Solihull	26 - 33	London Welsh
	Report

Old Deer Park
Attendance: 500
Referee: Wayne Barnes

27 April 2002

Exeter Chiefs	32 - 14	Otley
	Report

County Ground
Attendance: 738
Referee: Nigel Higginson

27 April 2002

Henley Hawks	20 - 54	Rotherham
	Report

Dry Leas
Attendance: 1,325
Referee: David Sainsbury

27 April 2002

Manchester	24 - 26	Coventry
	Report

Grove Park
Attendance: 674
Referee: Ashley Rowden

27 April 2002

Moseley	7 - 42	Worcester
	Report

Bournbrook
Attendance: 1,529
Referee: J Barnard

27 April 2002

Rugby Lions	49 - 27	Bracknell
	Report

Webb Ellis Road
Attendance: 600
Referee: Trevor Fisher

== Total season attendances ==
Club	Home Games	Total	Average	Highest	Lowest	% Capacity
Bedford Blues	13	18,445	1,419	1,908	956	28%
Birmingham & Solihull	13	6,350	488	1,000	200	12%
Bracknell	13	4,805	370	750	150	30%
Coventry	13	24,718	1,901	4,132	924	19%
Exeter Chiefs	13	11,932	918	1,530	487	16%
Henley Hawks	13	9,575	737	1,325	300	18%
London Welsh	13	11,750	904	1,400	400	20%
Manchester	13	6,685	514	828	225	13%
Moseley	13	6,673	513	1,529	150	
Otley	13	9,300	715	1,500	430	10%
Rotherham	13	18,451	1,419	2,500	1,000	57%
Rugby Lions	13	6,491	499	836	300	16%
Wakefield	13	4,800	369	1,100	250	9%
Worcester	12 (Note: Missing home attendance v Manchester on 1 September 2001.)	28,515	2,376	4,800	1,448	28%

== Individual statistics ==
- Note that points scorers includes tries as well as conversions, penalties and drop goals.

=== Top points scorers ===
Rank	Player	Team	Appearances	Points
1	(England) Simon Binns	Otley	24	283
2	(Australia) Chris Malone	Exeter Chiefs	22	247
3	(Canada) James Pritchard	Bedford Blues	24	244
4	(England) Rob Liley	Wakefield	24	237
5	(England) Martyn Davies	Coventry	21	223
6	(England) John Fabian	Henley Hawks	21	199
7	(Italy) Ramiro Pez	Rotherham	20	197
8	(England) Marcus Barrow	Manchester	16	141
9	(England) John Ufton	London Welsh	17	133
10	(Wales) Richard Davies	Rugby Lions	26	127

=== Top try scorers ===
Rank	Player	Team	Appearances	Tries
1	(Australia) Chris Garrard	Worcester	23	25
2	(Scotland) Ben Hinshelwood	Worcester	26	21
3	(England) Duncan Roke	Worcester	20	16
3	(England) Richard Baxter	Exeter Chiefs	26	16
4	(England) Nick Baxter	Birmingham & Solihull	26	15
5	(Spain) Oriol Ripol	Rotherham	13	14
5	(England) Kurt Johnson	Coventry	23	14
6	(England) Michael Wood	Rotherham	19	13
6	(Samoa) Alfie To'oala	Rotherham	22	13
7	(England) Chris Johnson	Rotherham	21	12
7	(England) Phil Read	Rugby Lions	25	12

== Season records ==
=== Team ===
Largest home win — 73 pts

73 - 0 Rotherham at home to Birmingham & Solihull on 13 April 2002

Largest away win — 65 pts

72 - 7 Rotherham away to Manchester on 6 April 2002

Most points scored — 73 pts

73 - 0 Rotherham at home to Birmingham & Solihull on 13 April 2002

Most tries in a match — 12

Rotherham away to Manchester on 6 April 2002

Most conversions in a match — 9

Worcester at home to Henley Hawks on 19 January 2002

Most penalties in a match — 9

Manchester at home to Wakefield on 15 December 2001

Most drop goals in a match — 3

Exeter Chiefs away to Rotherham on 10 November 2001

=== Player ===
Most points in a match — 32

(Tonga) Sateki Tuipulotu for Worcester at home to Henley Hawks on 19 January 2002

Most tries in a match — 5 (x2)

(Australia) Chris Garrard for Worcester at home to Otley on 9 March 2002
(England) Michael Wood for Rotherham at home to Birmingham & Solihull on 13 April 2002

Most conversions in a match — 8 (x2)

(England) Tony Yapp for Worcester at home to Henley Hawks on 19 January 2002
(United States) Link Wilfley for Rotherham at home to Moseley on 30 March 2002

Most penalties in a match — 9

(England) Marcus Barrow for Manchester at home to Wakefield on 15 December 2001

Most drop goals in a match — 3

(Australia) Chris Malone for Exeter Chiefs away to Rotherham on 10 November 2001

=== Attendances ===
Highest — 4,800

Worcester at home to Rotherham on 22 September 2001

Lowest — 150 (x2)

Bracknell at home to Exeter Chiefs on 2 March 2002
Moseley at home to Rugby Lions on 23 March 2002

Highest Average Attendance — 2,376 (Note: Worcester are missing 1 home attendance so this figure is not 100% accurate.)

Worcester

Lowest Average Attendance — 369

Wakefield

== See also ==
- English rugby union system
