= Alfie Vaeluaga =

Samoa international rugby union player

- Born: Alfie To'oala Vaeluaga; 30 January 1980 (age 46) Faga, Samoa
- Height: 1.84 m (6 ft 0 in)
- Weight: 118 kg (18 st 8 lb)
- Occupation: Fitness Trainer

Rugby union career
- Position(s): Flanker, Number 8
Senior career
Years	Team	Apps	(Points)
2000-01	Otahuhu		
2001-03	Rotherham	46	(95)
2003-04	Orrell	25	(60)
2004-06	Plymouth Albion	49	(95)
2006-09	Bristol	66	(20)
2009-11	Leeds Carnegie	42	(20)
2011-12	La Rochelle	24	(20)
2012-13	London Welsh	14	(5)
2013-14	Rotherham Titans	23	(10)
2014-?	Chinnor	24	(80)
- Correct as of 26 April 2015
International career
Years	Team	Apps	(Points)
2001-2007	Samoa	13	(0)
- Correct as of 22 December 2015

Alfie To'oala Vaeluaga (born 30 January 1980) is a professional rugby union player who can play at Flanker or at Number 8. He has an extensive rugby union career, having played club rugby in New Zealand, England and France. He has top flight experience with Bristol, Leeds Carnegie and London Welsh and has been capped 13 times by Samoa including being called up to the Samoa World Cup 2007 team as a replacement for Filipo Levi who fractured his eye socket in a warm up match against Sale. Alfie became a player-coach at National League 2 South side Chinnor.

== Early career ==
Born in Samoa, Alfie Comes from the Villages of Faga, Motootua & Faleata, Alfie moved to New Zealand as a boy and grew up in Auckland where he attended De La Salle College, a boys secondary school notable for producing rugby union players. From school he joined Otahuha, a feeder team for the Auckland Blues, playing in the Gallaher Shield at level 4 of the New Zealand domestic game. While at Otahuhu he got his first taste of silverware when he helped the club to win the Gallaher Cup held at Eden Park in July 2000 - defeating Ponsonby 24 - 13. The next year his team made it back to the final, once again facing Ponsonby, but were unable to retain their trophy as they lost 13 - 31.

in 2001 Alfie moved to England to join Rotherham for the 2001-02 season playing in the second division of English club rugby. He made an instant impression at the Yorkshire club, finishing in the top 10 of the divisions top try scorers with 13 tries, and he was also selected by Manu Samoa for their 2001-02 international tour. Rotherham also won the league title that year but were denied promotion to the Zurich Premiership as they were deemed to have failed the minimum standards criteria for entry. Despite this disappointment of missing out on promotion due to a technicality, Rotherham bounced back and won the 2002–03 National Division One for the second year running, finally gaining promotion to the Premiership, with Alfie contributing 5 tries in the league.

Unfortunately for Alfie he would not gain Premiership experience with Rotherham and instead stayed in National Division One for the 2003-04 season, signing for ambitious Lancashire side Orrell - then owned by Dave Whelan. At Orrell he had a similar impact to his first season at Rotherham, scoring 10 tries in the division and helping the club to finish as runners up to a very strong Worcester side who went undefeated all season. Failure to gain promotion to the Premiership proved to be disastrous as Dave Whelan decided to stop investing in the club, which coupled with coach Ross Reynolds leaving as a result, prompted a mass exodus of players from the club including Alfie. For the 2004-05 season Alfie remained in National Division One but moved all the way across the country to sign for Plymouth Albion who had finished in 3rd position behind Orrell the previous year. He continued to play good rugby in the division, staying at the Devon club for two seasons, and helping them to 3rd and 5th-placed finishes in the league, scoring 15 tries in the process.

== Premiership & French club career ==
In 2006 Alfie was picked up by Premiership side Bristol who he had experience of playing against during his first season at Albion. He made 16 league appearances during the 2006-07 season as Bristol managed to stay in the division in 11th place ahead of Leeds Tykes, who were relegated instead. Initially, signed on a two-year contract, his performances on his debut season led to the club offering him a new, three-year deal. After being made part of the Manu Samoa team for their 2006-07 international tour, he also made the squad for the 2007 Rugby World Cup, making made three appearances (two from the bench) at the competition held in France, which was a disappointing one for Samoa as they failed to progress from the group stage, finishing 4th in their group behind rivals Tonga.

The 2007-08 season was a great one for Bristol as they came 4th in the league and qualified for the playoffs - a great turnaround for a club who had finished one spot off relegation the previous year - losing to eventual winners Leicester Tigers 14 - 26 in the semi-finals. Alfie made 13 appearances for the club and was called up to represent Samoa at the 2007 Pacific Nations Cup making 1 appearance for a Samoa side which finished 3rd. The 2008-09 season was Alfie's last at Bristol. Despite making the most appearances in a league season in the three years spent at the club, he would finish as part of a relegated team who only won 2 games out of 22 and would drop to the newly labelled RFU Championship.

Following Bristol's relegation Alfie moved back north to Yorkshire where his family was based in May 2009, this time to join newly promoted Leeds Carnegie for the 2009-10 season. His first season at Leeds was a success as he helped his team stay up in a very competitive league but the second saw Leeds finish bottom of the league table, being dead level with relegation rivals Newcastle Falcons but having a weaker for and against points difference. There was a slim chance Leeds could stay up due to the controversial minimum standards entry (which had denied Alfie's former team Rotherham all those years ago) but with the victory of Worcester Warriors in the Championship Playoffs, Leeds were down and Alfie decided to leave England after 9 seasons to join French side La Rochelle playing in the second division of French rugby.

Even though he was dropping a division to play rugby for La Rochelle in the 2011–12 Rugby Pro D2 season, the French second division was far stronger than the English equivalent in terms of both finances and supporter attendances, and La Rochelle were an ambitious club who had only just been relegated from the Top 14. In a very competitive division, La Rochelle finished 5th in the regular season, just qualifying for the end of season playoffs (the league champions went up straight away leaving 2nd - 5th in the playoffs). An away tie beckoned against 2nd placed Pau who edged a tight game 16 - 14 to leave La Rochelle to contemplate another season in Pro D2. By the end of his only year in France, Vaeluaga recorded 24 appearances and 20 points.

== End of playing career ==
Having failed to help La Rochelle go up at the first attempt, Alfie returned to England to sign for Premiership new boys London Welsh who had qualified for the league in the first time in the club's history. Alfie's did not have a good season for Welsh who were relegated from the 2012-13 Premiership despite being fairly competitive (they actually had as may wins as 11th placed Worcester Warriors but had more defeats and did badly in acquiring bonus points) and he was not a first team regular only starting 4 league games. Alfie left at the end of the season to re-join his first English club, Rotherham Titans, who were playing in the 2013–14 RFU Championship stating that he was delighted to return to the club "where he had the happiest time of his career". During Vaeluaga's spell at London Welsh, he recorded the fourth highest bench press weightlift of any rugby player in the world at 210 kg.

Playing for the Titans, Vaeluaga had a run of games in the Titans squad and helped them to 4th place in the league and qualifying for the promotion playoffs. He played in the two semi final matches against former club Bristol but was unable to prevent his team from losing both games, ending any dreams of taking the Championship title.

During the summer of 2014 Alfie decided to leave Rotherham to pursue his coaching career, signing as a player-coach for ambitious Chinnor, plying their trade in National League 2 South. As expected of a man with international and top flight experience, Alfie had an excellent debut season at the Oxfordshire, helping the club to a sixth-placed finish in the league and being ranked in the top 10 try scorers with 16 tries.

== Post-playing career ==
Since his playing career, Vaeluaga became a personal fitness trainer in Newport, Wales. Vaeluaga is also a part of the legal action on behalf of 200 ex rugby players against the England Rugby Football Union due to brain injuries which occurred during their playing careers.

== Honours ==
Otahuhu

- Gallaher Shield winners: 2000
- Gallaher Shield runners up: 2001

Rotherham Titans

- National Division One champions (2 times): 2001-02, 2002-03
