= Wackett (surname) =

Wackett is a surname. Notable people and fictional characters with the surname include:

== Real people ==
- Byron F. Wackett, American politician
- Ellis Wackett (1901–1984), Australian commander
- John Wackett (1930–2024), English rugby union player
- Lawrence Wackett (1896–1982), Australian aircraft industry pioneer
- Peter Wackett (born 1987), rugby union player

== Fictional characters ==
- Gary Wackett, fictional football captain in the 2001 British mockumentary Mike Bassett: England Manager
