= 2008–09 National Division One =

Rugby union competition in England

- Countries: England
- Champions: Leeds Carnegie
- Runners-up: Exeter Chiefs
- Relegated: Esher, Sedgley Park, Newbury, Otley, Manchester
- Attendance: 415,204 (average 1,745 per match) (Note: Note that 2 home attendance are missing (see below) - so the total attendance will not be 100% accurate. The average attendance has also been taken into account with the missing game not included.)
- Highest attendance: 7,345 Exeter Chiefs at home to Cornish Pirates on 27 December 2008
- Lowest attendance: 283 Manchester at home to Esher on 31 January 2009
- Top point scorer: (England) Jamie Lennard (Doncaster Knights) 303 points
- Top try scorer: (England) Billy Twelvetrees (Bedford Blues) (England) David Jackson (Nottingham) 18 tries

The 2008–09 National Division One was the 22nd full season of rugby union within the second tier of the English league system, currently known as the RFU Championship. Leeds Carnegie joined National Division One, having been relegated from the Guinness Premiership after the 2007–08 season. Otley and Manchester were promoted from the 2007–08 National Division Two.

Leeds Carnegie won a quick promotion back to the Guinness Premiership, while five teams were relegated to the newly named 2009–10 National League 1: Esher, Sedgley Park, Newbury, Otley and Manchester. The reason for the large number of teams being relegated was due to the league being restructured the next season from 16 to 12 teams as the new RFU Championship was introduced.

== Participating teams ==
Locations of the 2008–09 National Division One teams

Team	Stadium	Capacity	City/Area
Bedford Blues	Goldington Road	5,000 (Note: Goldington Road capacity down from 5,307 to 5,000 for the 2008–09 season.)	Bedford, Bedfordshire
Cornish Pirates	Recreation Ground	9,000	Camborne, Cornwall
Coventry	Butts Park Arena	4,000	Coventry, West Midlands
Doncaster Knights	Castle Park	3,075	Doncaster, South Yorkshire
Esher	Molesey Road	3,000	Hersham, Surrey
Exeter Chiefs	Sandy Park	8,000	Exeter, Devon
Leeds Carnegie	Headingley Stadium	22,250	Leeds, West Yorkshire
London Welsh	Old Deer Park	4,500 (1,500 seats)	Richmond, London
Manchester	Grove Park (Note: Manchester would play a 'home game' on 8 April 2009 at Headingley Stadium in Leeds against Leeds Carnegie due to them not having floodlights at Grove Park.)	4,000	Cheadle Hulme, Greater Manchester
Moseley	Billesley Common	3,000+	Birmingham, West Midlands
Newbury	Monk's Lane	8,000	Newbury, Berkshire
Nottingham	Meadow Lane	19,588	Nottingham, Nottinghamshire
Otley	Cross Green	7,000 (852 seats)	Otley, West Yorkshire
Plymouth Albion	The Brickfields	6,500	Plymouth, Devon
Rotherham Titans	Clifton Lane	2,500	Rotherham, South Yorkshire
Sedgley Park	Park Lane	3,000	Whitefield, Greater Manchester

== Table ==
2008–09 National Division One table
Pos	Team	Pld	W	D	L	PF	PA	PD	TB	LB	Pts
1	Leeds Carnegie (P)	30	28	0	2	1238	376	+862	20	1	133
2	Exeter Chiefs	30	23	2	5	1077	453	+624	20	3	119
3	Bedford Blues	30	23	0	7	892	472	+420	17	2	111
4	Nottingham	30	22	0	8	973	499	+474	16	4	106 (Note: Points deducted for breach of regulations)
5	Doncaster Knights	30	21	2	7	895	571	+324	14	3	105
6	London Welsh	30	19	0	11	788	611	+177	11	6	91
7	Cornish Pirates	30	16	1	13	743	578	+165	11	5	82
8	Moseley	30	13	0	17	814	782	+32	13	8	73
9	Coventry	30	14	0	16	639	712	−73	11	5	72
10	Rotherham Titans	30	15	1	14	794	775	+19	9	3	70
11	Plymouth Albion	30	13	2	15	607	669	−62	7	3	66
12	Esher (R)	30	12	1	17	676	830	−154	9	2	61
13	Sedgley Park (R)	30	6	0	24	458	1206	−748	6	4	34
14	Newbury (R)	30	4	2	24	419	1047	−628	2	5	27
15	Otley (R)	30	3	1	26	418	1118	−700	3	6	21
16	Manchester (R)	30	2	0	28	433	1165	−732	4	5	17

Updated to match(es) played on 2009-05-09. Source: Statbunker.com
Rules for classification:
- 4 points for a win
- 2 points for a draw
- 0 points for a loss
- 1 bonus point (BP) for losing by 7 points or less
- 1 bonus point (BT) for scoring 4 tries or more in a match
(P) Promoted; (R) Relegated

== Results ==
=== Round 1 ===
30 August 2008

(BP) Bedford Blues	62 - 0	Manchester
	Report

Goldington Road
Attendance: 1,933
Referee: Richard Draper

30 August 2008

(BP) Doncaster Knights	36 - 15	Otley
	Report

Castle Park
Attendance: 868
Referee: Adrian Hartwell

30 August 2008

Esher	8 - 46	Exeter Chiefs (BP)
	Report

Molesey Road
Attendance: 650
Referee: Terry Hall

30 August 2008

(BP) Moseley	9 - 15	London Welsh
	Report

Billesley
Attendance: 815
Referee: Llyr Apgeraint-Roberts

30 August 2008

Plymouth Albion	13 - 5	Coventry (BP)
	Report

Brickfields
Attendance: 2,892
Referee: Keith Lewis

30 August 2008

Sedgley Park	20 - 12	Rotherham Titans
	Report

Park Lane
Attendance: 596
Referee: Mark Wilson

31 August 2008

(BP) Cornish Pirates	48 - 5	Newbury
	Report

Recreation Ground
Attendance: 2,846
Referee: Nick Williams

31 August 2008

(BP) Leeds Carnegie	34 - 19	Nottingham
	Report

Headingley Stadium
Attendance: 3,703
Referee: Kitt Rowan

=== Round 2 ===
6 September 2008

Coventry	16 - 0	Cornish Pirates
	Report

Butts Park Arena
Attendance: 1,269
Referee: Mark Wilson

6 September 2008

(BP) Exeter Chiefs	13 - 14	Leeds Carnegie
	Report

Sandy Park
Attendance: 5,693
Referee: Llyr Apgeraint-Roberts

6 September 2008

(BP) Manchester	35 - 51	Sedgley Park (BP)
	Report

Grove Park
Attendance: 631
Referee: Tim Wigglesworth

7 September 2008

London Welsh	31 - 16	Doncaster Knights
	Report

Old Deer Park
Attendance: 960
Referee: Terry Hall

6 September 2008

Newbury	12 - 30	Moseley
	Report

Monk's Lane
Attendance: 488
Referee: Ashley Rowden

7 September 2008

(BP) Nottingham	43 - 19	Plymouth Albion
	Report

Meadow Lane
Attendance: 1,100
Referee: Nick Williams

6 September 2008

(BP) Otley	12 - 18	Esher
	Report

Cross Green
Attendance: 516
Referee: Rob Debney

7 September 2008

Rotherham Titans	10 - 33	Bedford Blues (BP)
	Report

Clifton Lane
Attendance: 642
Referee: Keith Lewis

=== Round 3 ===
13 September 2008

(BP) Bedford Blues	53 - 12	Newbury
	Report

Goldington Road
Attendance: 2,133
Referee: Dean Richards

13 September 2008

Esher	3 - 25	Nottingham
	Report

Molesey Road
Attendance: 380
Referee: Roy Maybank

13 September 2008

(BP) Moseley	34 - 12	Coventry
	Report

Billesley
Attendance: 1,090
Referee: Adrian Hartwell

13 September 2008

(BP) Plymouth Albion	47 - 6	Manchester
	Report

Brickfields
Attendance: 2,163
Referee: David Rose

13 September 2008

Sedgley Park	11 - 43	London Welsh (BP)
	Report

Park Lane
Attendance: 698
Referee: Chris Sharp

14 September 2008

Cornish Pirates	23 - 32	Exeter Chiefs
	Report

Recreation Ground
Attendance: 4,913
Referee: Rowan Kitt

14 September 2008

Doncaster Knights	28 - 22	Rotherham Titans (BP)
	Report

Castle Park
Attendance: 1,613
Referee: Nick Williams

14 September 2008

(BP) Leeds Carnegie	58 - 14	Otley
	Report

Headingley Stadium
Attendance: 4,112
Referee: Mark Wilson

=== Round 4 ===
20 September 2008

(BP) Coventry	33 - 8	Esher
	Report

Butts Park Arena
Attendance: 892
Referee: Llyr Apgeraint-Roberts

20 September 2008

(BP) Exeter Chiefs	70 - 10	Moseley
	Report

Sandy Park
Attendance: 3,724
Referee: Mark Wilson

20 September 2008

London Welsh	23 - 32	Bedford Blues
	Report

Old Deer Park
Attendance: 1,931
Referee: Graham Knox

20 September 2008

Manchester	23 - 39	Doncaster Knights (BP)
	Report

Grove Park
Attendance: 423
Referee: Andrew Small

20 September 2008

Newbury	19 - 11	Plymouth Albion
	Report

Monk's Lane
Attendance: 395
Referee: Terry Hall

20 September 2008

Otley	25 - 31	Cornish Pirates (BP)
	Report

Cross Green
Attendance: 675
Referee: Tim Wigglesworth

21 September 2008

(BP) Nottingham	32 - 24	Sedgley Park
	Report

Meadow Lane
Attendance: 1,207
Referee: Ashley Rowden

21 September 2008

Rotherham Titans	24 - 41	Leeds Carnegie (BP)
	Report

Clifton Lane
Attendance: 2,021
Referee: Chris Sharp

=== Round 5 ===
27 September 2008

(BP) Bedford Blues	23 - 26	Exeter Chiefs
	Report

Goldington Road
Attendance: 2,986
Referee: JP Doyle

27 September 2008

(BP) Doncaster Knights	37 - 9	Newbury
	Report

Castle Park
Attendance: 846
Referee: Ashley Rowden

27 September 2008

(BP) Esher	32 - 59	Rotherham Titans (BP)
	Report

Molesey Road
Attendance: 710
Referee: Mark Wilson

27 September 2008

(BP) Moseley	36 - 26	Otley (BP)
	Report

Billesley
Attendance: 836
Referee: Chris Sharp

27 September 2008

(BP) Plymouth Albion	24 - 25	London Welsh
	Report

Brickfields
Attendance: 2,602
Referee: Adrian Hartwell

27 September 2008

(BP) Sedgley Park	27 - 30	Coventry
	Report

Park Lane
Attendance: 638
Referee: Greg Garner

28 September 2008

Cornish Pirates	20 - 31	Nottingham (BP)
	Report

Recreation Ground
Attendance: 2,750
Referee: Llyr Apgeraint-Roberts

28 September 2008

(BP) Leeds Carnegie	57 - 0	Manchester
	Report

Headingley Stadium
Attendance: 3,092
Referee: Kitt Rowan

=== Round 6 ===
3 October 2008

Coventry	3 - 26	Bedford Blues
	Report

Butts Park Arena
Attendance: 1,700
Referee: Llyr Apgeraint-Roberts

4 October 2008

(BP) Exeter Chiefs	71 - 5	Sedgley Park
	Report

Sandy Park
Attendance: 4,016
Referee: Keith Lewis

4 October 2008

London Welsh	0 - 38	Leeds Carnegie (BP)
	Report

Old Deer Park
Attendance: 1,449
Referee: Greg Garner

4 October 2008

(BP) Manchester	6 - 12	Cornish Pirates
	Report

Grove Park
Attendance: 341
Referee: Michael Tutty

4 October 2008

(BP) Newbury	8 - 14	Esher
	Report

Monk's Lane
Attendance: 680
Referee: Rowan Kitt

4 October 2008

Otley	16 - 31	Plymouth Albion (BP)
	Report

Cross Green
Attendance: 550
Referee: JP Doyle

4 October 2008

(BP) Rotherham Titans	47 - 23	Moseley
	Report

Clifton Lane
Attendance: 1,021
Referee: Andrew Small

5 October 2008

Nottingham	18 - 9	Doncaster Knights
	Report

Meadow Lane
Attendance: 1,345
Referee: Mark Wilson

=== Round 7 ===
11 October 2008

(BP) Bedford Blues	37 - 12	Otley
	Report

Goldington Road
Attendance: 2,464
Referee: Nick Williams

11 October 2008

(BP) Doncaster Knights	34 - 22	Coventry
	Report

Castle Park
Attendance: 1,443
Referee: Terry Hall

11 October 2008

(BP) Esher	36 - 19	Manchester
	Report

Molesey Road
Attendance: 827
Referee: David Rose

11 October 2008

(BP) Moseley	24 - 26	Nottingham
	Report

Billesley
Attendance: 998
Referee: Chris Sharp

11 October 2008

Newbury	9 - 20	London Welsh
	Report

Monk's Lane
Attendance: 875
Referee: JP Doyle

11 October 2008

Plymouth Albion	14 - 41	Exeter Chiefs (BP)
	Report

Brickfields
Attendance: 6,871
Referee: Rowan Kitt

11 October 2008

Sedgley Park	7 - 52	Leeds Carnegie (BP)
	Report

Park Lane
Attendance: 886
Referee: Adrian Hartwell

12 October 2008

(BP) Cornish Pirates	27 - 32	Rotherham Titans (BP)
	Report

Recreation Ground
Attendance: 2,488
Referee: Greg Garner

=== Round 8 ===
18 October 2008

(BP) Bedford Blues	53 - 7	Sedgley Park
	Report

Goldington Road
Attendance: 2,717
Referee: Mark Wilson

18 October 2008

Doncaster Knights	24 - 24	Cornish Pirates
	Report

Castle Park
Attendance: 1,102
Referee: Dean Richards

18 October 2008

(BP) London Welsh	43 - 19	Esher
	Report

Old Deer Park
Attendance: 1,480
Referee: Chris Sharp

18 October 2008

(BP) Manchester	35 - 54	Rotherham Titans (BP)
	Report

Grove Park
Attendance: 471
Referee: Rowan Kitt

18 October 2008

Otley	0 - 69	Exeter Chiefs (BP)
	Report

Cross Green
Attendance: 460
Referee: Darren Gamage

18 October 2008

Plymouth Albion	26 - 17	Moseley
	Report

Brickfields
Attendance: 2,406
Referee: Ashley Rowden

19 October 2008

Leeds Carnegie	57 - 5	Coventry
	Report

Headingley Stadium
Attendance: 2,972
Referee: Tim Wigglesworth

19 October 2008

(BP) Nottingham	48 - 3	Newbury
	Report

Meadow Lane
Attendance: 1,277
Referee: Adrian Hartwell

=== Round 9 ===
25 October 2008

(BP) Coventry	29 - 18	Manchester
	Report

Butts Park Arena
Attendance: 978
Referee: Roy Maybank

25 October 2008

Esher	8 - 52	Leeds Carnegie (BP)
	Report

Molesey Road
Attendance: 1,124
Referee: Sean Davey

25 October 2008

Exeter Chiefs	10 - 3	London Welsh (BP)
	Report

Sandy Park
Attendance: 4,813
Referee: Dean Richards

25 October 2008

Newbury	26 - 20	Otley (BP)
	Report

Monk's Lane
Attendance: 499
Referee: Rowan Kitt

25 October 2008

Rotherham Titans	10 - 10	Plymouth Albion
	Report

Clifton Lane
Attendance: 1,011
Referee: Adrian Hartwell

25 October 2008

Sedgley Park	3 - 41	Doncaster Knights (BP)
	Report

Park Lane
Attendance: 595
Referee: Chris Sharp

26 October 2008

Cornish Pirates	19 - 15	Moseley (BP)
	Report

Recreation Ground
Attendance: 2,530
Referee: Nick Williams

26 October 2008

Nottingham	15 - 7	Bedford Blues
	Report

Meadow Lane
Attendance: 2,019
Referee: Llyr Apgeraint-Roberts

=== Round 10 ===
1 November 2008

Bedford Blues	6 - 26	Cornish Pirates
	Report

Goldington Road
Attendance: 2,514
Referee: Rowan Kitt

1 November 2008

(BP) Coventry	31 - 7	Newbury
	Report

Butts Park Arena
Attendance: 1,204
Referee: Andrew Small

1 November 2008

Leeds Carnegie	28 - 13	Doncaster Knights
	Report

Headingley Stadium
Attendance: 3,415
Referee: David Pearson

1 November 2008

(BP) London Welsh	27 - 17	Rotherham Titans
	Report

Old Deer Park
Attendance: 1,070
Referee: Ashley Rowden

1 November 2008

(BP) Manchester	19 - 26	Exeter Chiefs (BP)
	Report

Grove Park
Attendance: 374
Referee: Terry Hall

1 November 2008

Moseley	22 - 13	Esher
	Report

Billesley
Attendance: 750
Referee: Llyr Apgeraint-Roberts

1 November 2008

Otley	3 - 43	Nottingham (BP)
	Report

Cross Green
Attendance: 952
Referee: Adrian Hartwell

1 November 2008

(BP) Plymouth Albion	31 - 7	Sedgley Park
	Report

Brickfields
Attendance: 2,143
Referee: Roy Maybank

=== Round 11 ===
8 November 2008

Esher	3 - 19	Cornish Pirates
	Report

Molesey Road
Attendance: 589
Referee: Keith Lewis

8 November 2008

(BP) Exeter Chiefs	29 - 18	Nottingham
	Report

Sandy Park
Attendance: 4,634
Referee: David Rose

8 November 2008

(BP) Newbury	26 - 6	Manchester
	Report

Monk's Lane
Attendance: 434
Referee: Rowan Kitt

8 November 2008

(BP) Otley	6 - 9	London Welsh
	Report

Cross Green
Attendance: 1,983
Referee: Dean Richards

8 November 2008

Plymouth Albion	21 - 18	Doncaster Knights (BP)
	Report

Brickfields
Attendance: 1,983
Referee: Chris Sharp

8 November 2008

Rotherham Titans	28 - 27	Coventry (BP)
	Report

Clifton Lane
Attendance: 892
Referee: Nick Williams

8 November 2008

Sedgley Park	17 - 44	Moseley (BP)
	Report

Park Lane
Attendance: 556
Referee: Adrian Hartwell

9 November 2008

Leeds Carnegie	19 - 8	Bedford Blues
	Report

Headingley Stadium
Attendance: 3,051
Referee: Martin Fox

=== Round 12 ===
15 November 2008

(BP) Bedford Blues	37 - 9	Plymouth Albion
	Report

Goldington Road
Attendance: 2,010
Referee: Adrian Hartwell

15 November 2008

(BP) Coventry	48 - 3	Otley
	Report

Butts Park Arena
Attendance: 838
Referee: Darren Gamage

15 November 2008

(BP) Manchester	14 - 19	London Welsh
	Report

Grove Park
Attendance: 293
Referee: Andrew Small

15 November 2008

(BP) Moseley	12 - 19	Doncaster Knights
	Report

Billesley
Attendance: 682
Referee: JP Doyle

15 November 2008

Newbury	20 - 37	Exeter Chiefs (BP)
	Report

Monk's Lane
Attendance: 703
Referee: Chris Sharp

15 November 2008

(BP) Sedgley Park	27 - 26	Esher (2BP)
	Report

Park Lane
Attendance: 525
Referee: Roy Maybank

16 November 2008

(BP) Cornish Pirates	23 - 25	Leeds Carnegie
	Report

Recreation Ground
Attendance: 3,853
Referee: Nick Williams

16 November 2008

(BP) Nottingham	33 - 13	Rotherham Titans
	Report

Meadow Lane
Attendance: 2,226
Referee: Llyr Apgeraint-Roberts

=== Round 13 ===
22 November 2008

(BP) Doncaster Knights	50 - 21	Bedford Blues
	Report

Castle Park
Attendance: 1,735
Referee: Llyr Apgeraint-Roberts

22 November 2008

(BP) Exeter Chiefs	45 - 8	Coventry
	Report

Sandy Park
Attendance: 4,256
Referee: Keith Lewis

22 November 2008

(BP) London Welsh	30 - 36	Nottingham (BP)
	Report

Old Deer Park
Attendance: 820
Referee: JP Doyle

22 November 2008

(BP) Manchester	14 - 15	Otley
	Report

Grove Park
Attendance: 393
Referee: Nick Williams

22 November 2008

(BP) Plymouth Albion	36 - 14	Esher
	Report

Brickfields
Attendance: 1,742
Referee: Greg Garner

23 November 2008

(BP) Cornish Pirates	56 - 14	Sedgley Park
	Report

Recreation Ground
Attendance: 2,324
Referee: Adrian Hartwell

23 November 2008

(BP) Leeds Carnegie	53 - 20	Moseley
	Report

Headingley Stadium
Attendance: 2,203
Referee: Mark Wilson

23 November 2008

(BP) Rotherham Titans	62 - 5	Newbury
	Report

Clifton Lane
Attendance: 1,127
Referee: Darren Gamage

=== Round 14 ===
28 November 2008

Bedford Blues	17 - 15	Moseley (BP)
	Report

Goldington Road
Attendance: 2,406
Referee: Greg Garner

29 November 2008

Esher	10 - 23	Doncaster Knights
	Report

Molesey Road
Attendance: 694
Referee: Mark Wilson

29 November 2008

(BP) Exeter Chiefs	76 - 21	Rotherham Titans
	Report

Sandy Park
Attendance: 3,965
Referee: Chris Sharp

29 November 2008

(BP) London Welsh	21 - 23	Coventry
	Report

Old Deer Park
Attendance: 710
Referee: Rowan Kitt

29 November 2008

Newbury	12 - 89	Leeds Carnegie (BP)
	Report

Monk's Lane
Attendance: 316
Referee: Terry Hall

29 November 2008

Otley	14 - 7	Sedgley Park (BP)
	Report

Cross Green
Attendance: 857
Referee: JP Doyle

29 November 2008

Plymouth Albion	20 - 12	Cornish Pirates
	Report

Brickfields
Attendance: 5,421
Referee: Llyr Apgeraint-Roberts

30 November 2008

(BP) Nottingham	57 - 8	Manchester
	Report

Meadow Lane
Attendance: 1,247
Referee: Michael Tutty

=== Round 15 ===
6 December 2008

(2BP) Doncaster Knights	29 - 34	Exeter Chiefs (BP)
	Report

Castle Park
Attendance: 1,388
Referee: Adrian Hartwell

6 December 2008

(BP) Esher	13 - 18	Bedford Blues
	Report

Molesey Road
Attendance: 1,081
Referee: Keith Lewis

6 December 2008

London Welsh	23 - 38	Cornish Pirates (BP)
	Report

Old Deer Park
Attendance: 1,265
Referee: Greg Garner

6 December 2008

(BP) Moseley	48 - 7	Manchester
	Report

Billesley
Attendance: 822
Referee: Llyr Apgeraint-Roberts

6 December 2008

(BP) Rotherham Titans	42 - 13	Otley
	Report

Clifton Lane
Attendance: 1,067
Referee: Rowan Kitt

6 December 2008

(BP) Sedgley Park	42 - 37	Newbury (2BP)
	Report

Park Lane
Attendance: 564
Referee: Andrew Vertigan

7 December 2008

Nottingham	P - P	Coventry

- Postponed. Game rescheduled to 19 April 2009.

7 December 2008

(BP) Leeds Carnegie	49 - 18	Plymouth Albion
	Report

Headingley Stadium
Attendance: 2,528
Referee: Tim Wigglesworth

=== Round 16 ===
13 December 2008

(BP) Coventry	6 - 7	Plymouth Albion
	Report

Butts Park Arena
Attendance: 961
Referee: Andrew Vertigan

13 December 2008

Exeter Chiefs	12 - 12	Esher
	Report

Sandy Park
Attendance: 3,848
Referee: Andrew Small

13 December 2008

London Welsh	P - P	Moseley

- Postponed. Game rescheduled to 2 May 2009.

13 December 2008

Manchester	5 - 25	Bedford Blues (BP)
	Report

Grove Park
Attendance: 324
Referee: Darren Gamage

13 December 2008

Otley	16 - 27	Doncaster Knights (BP)
	Report

Cross Green
Attendance: 457
Referee: Terry Hall

13 December 2008

Rotherham Titans	22 - 0	Sedgley Park
	Report

Clifton Lane
Attendance: 848
Referee: Mark Wilson

14 December 2008

Newbury	P - P	Cornish Pirates

- Postponed. Game rescheduled to 28 February 2009.

14 December 2008

(BP) Nottingham	12 - 19	Leeds Carnegie
	Report

Meadow Lane
Attendance: 2,663
Referee: Martin Fox

=== Round 17 ===
20 December 2008

(BP) Bedford Blues	32 - 18	Rotherham Titans
	Report

Goldington Road
Attendance: 2,338
Referee: Andrew Small

20 December 2008

Doncaster Knights	26 - 13	London Welsh
	Report

Castle Park
Attendance: 1,300
Referee: Mark Wilson

20 December 2008

(BP) Esher	48 - 16	Otley
	Report

Molesey Road
Attendance: 956
Referee: Graham Knox

20 December 2008

Leeds Carnegie	18 - 16	Exeter Chiefs (BP)
	Report

Headingley Stadium
Attendance: 5,463
Referee: Rob Debney

20 December 2008

(BP) Moseley	36 - 9	Newbury
	Report

Billesley
Attendance: 700
Referee: Terry Hall

20 December 2008

Plymouth Albion	26 - 25	Nottingham (BP)
	Report

Brickfields
Attendance: 3,102
Referee: Rowan Kitt

20 December 2008

(BP) Sedgley Park	12 - 16	Manchester
	Report

Park Lane
Attendance: 526
Referee: Chris Sharp

21 December 2008

(BP) Cornish Pirates	32 - 14	Coventry
	Report

Recreation Ground
Attendance: 2,877
Referee: Adrian Hartwell

=== Round 18 ===
26 December 2008

Coventry	27 - 10	Moseley
	Report

Butts Park Arena
Attendance: 3,638
Referee: Rowan Kitt

26 December 2008

Otley	10 - 66	Leeds Carnegie (BP)
	Report

Cross Green
Attendance: 2,610
Referee: Adrian Hartwell

27 December 2008

(BP) Exeter Chiefs	38 - 7	Cornish Pirates
	Report

Sandy Park
Attendance: 7,345
Referee: Llyr Apgeraint-Roberts

27 December 2008

(BP) London Welsh	60 - 0	Sedgley Park
	Report

Old Deer Park
Attendance: 1,110
Referee: Darren Gamage

27 December 2008

Manchester	5 - 31	Plymouth Albion (BP)
	Report

Grove Park
Attendance: 410
Referee: Chris Sharp

27 December 2008

Newbury	0 - 34	Bedford Blues (BP)
	Report

Monk's Lane
Attendance: 878
Referee: Paul Knowles

27 December 2008

(BP) Rotherham Titans	26 - 29	Doncaster Knights
	Report

Clifton Lane
Attendance: 2,548
Referee: Andrew Small

28 December 2008

(BP) Nottingham	36 - 14	Esher
	Report

Meadow Lane
Attendance: 1,463
Referee: Martin Fox

=== Round 19 ===
3 January 2009

(2BP) Bedford Blues	32 - 33	London Welsh (BP)
	Report

Goldington Road
Attendance: 3,171
Referee: Greg Garner

3 January 2009

(BP) Cornish Pirates	55 - 13	Otley
	Report

Recreation Ground
Attendance: 2,073
Referee: Paul Knowles

3 January 2009

(BP) Doncaster Knights	52 - 10	Manchester
	Report

Castle Park
Attendance: 1,169
Referee: Andrew Vertigan

3 January 2009

Esher	P - P	Coventry

- Postponed. Game rescheduled to 21 March 2009.

3 January 2009

Moseley	P - P	Exeter Chiefs

- Postponed. Game rescheduled to 21 March 2009.

3 January 2009

Plymouth Albion	17 - 17	Newbury
	Report

Brickfields
Attendance: 4,087
Referee: Rowan Kitt

3 January 2009

Sedgley Park	P - P	Nottingham

- Postponed. Game rescheduled to 1 April 2009.

4 January 2009

(BP) Leeds Carnegie	28 - 3	Rotherham Titans
	Report

Headingley Stadium
Attendance: 3,271
Referee: Mark Wilson

=== Round 20 ===
10 January 2010

Coventry	P - P	Sedgley Park

- Postponed. Game rescheduled to 28 February 2009.

10 January 2009

(BP) Exeter Chiefs	40 - 21	Bedford Blues
	Report

Sandy Park
Attendance: 4,092
Referee: Roy Maybank

10 January 2009

London Welsh	P - P	Plymouth Albion

- Postponed. Game rescheduled to 22 March 2009.

10 January 2009

Newbury	P - P	Doncaster Knights

- Postponed. Game rescheduled to 21 March 2009.

10 January 2009

Otley	P - P	Moseley

- Postponed. Game rescheduled to 9 May 2009.

10 January 2009

Rotherham Titans	P - P	Esher

- Postponed. Game rescheduled to 28 February 2009.

11 January 2009

Manchester	P - P	Leeds Carnegie

- Postponed. Game rescheduled to 8 April 2009.

11 January 2009

Nottingham	23 - 19	Cornish Pirates (BP)
	Report

Meadow Lane
Attendance: 1,705
Referee: JP Doyle

=== Round 21 ===
24 January 2009

(BP) Bedford Blues	23 - 9	Coventry
	Report

Goldington Road
Attendance: 2,506
Referee: Tim Wigglesworth

24 January 2009

Doncaster Knights	25 - 14	Nottingham
	Report

Castle Park
Attendance: 1,872
Referee: Llyr Apgeraint-Roberts

24 January 2009

(BP) Esher	49 - 18	Newbury
	Report

Molesey Road
Attendance: 1,049
Referee: David Rose

24 January 2009

(BP) Moseley	43 - 21	Rotherham Titans
	Report

Billesley
Attendance: 974
Referee: Adrian Hartwell

24 January 2009

Plymouth Albion	23 - 15	Otley
	Report

Brickfields
Attendance: 3,799
Referee: Terry Hall

24 January 2009

Sedgley Park	12 - 35	Exeter Chiefs (BP)
	Report

Park Lane
Attendance: 431
Referee: Graham Knox

25 January 2009

(BP) Cornish Pirates	25 - 10	Manchester
	Report

Recreation Ground
Attendance: 2,068
Referee: Paul Knowles

25 January 2009

(BP) Leeds Carnegie	35 - 10	London Welsh
	Report

Headingley Stadium
Attendance: 2,471
Referee: Andrew Small

=== Round 22 ===
31 January 2009

(BP) Coventry	26 - 20	Doncaster Knights (BP)
	Report

Butts Park Arena
Attendance: 1,252
Referee: Adrian Hartwell

31 January 2009

(BP) Exeter Chiefs	29 - 0	Plymouth Albion
	Report

Sandy Park
Attendance: 6,658
Referee: JP Doyle

31 January 2009

(BP) London Welsh	40 - 12	Newbury
	Report

Old Deer Park
Attendance: 980
Referee: Roy Maybank

31 January 2009

(BP) Manchester	28 - 40	Esher (BP)
	Report

Grove Park
Attendance: 283
Referee: Kitt Rowan

31 January 2009

(BP) Otley	17 - 23	Bedford Blues
	Report

Cross Green
Attendance: 522
Referee: Grant Wilson

31 January 2009

(2BP) Rotherham Titans	28 - 34	Cornish Pirates (BP)
	Report

Clifton Lane
Attendance: 1,523
Referee: Graham Knox

1 February 2009

(BP) Leeds Carnegie	66 - 0	Sedgley Park
	Report

Headingley Stadium
Attendance: 2,029
Referee: Darren Gamage

1 February 2009

(BP) Nottingham	44 - 17	Moseley
	Report

Meadow Lane
Attendance: 1,107
Referee: Greg Garner

=== Round 23 ===
14 February 2009

(BP) Coventry	11 - 15	Leeds Carnegie
	Report

Butts Park Arena
Attendance: 1,600
Referee: Rowan Kitt

14 February 2009

Esher	P - P	London Welsh

- Postponed. Game rescheduled to 18 April 2009.

14 February 2009

Exeter Chiefs	P - P	Otley

- Postponed. Game rescheduled to 18 April 2009.

14 February 2009

Moseley	P - P	Plymouth Albion

- Postponed. Game rescheduled to 29 April 2009.

14 February 2009

Rotherham Titans	15 - 13	Manchester (BP)
	Report

Clifton Lane
Attendance: 792
Referee: Andrew Small

14 February 2009

Sedgley Park	P - P	Bedford Blues

- Postponed. Game rescheduled to 21 February 2009.

15 February 2009

Cornish Pirates	P - P	Doncaster Knights

- Postponed. Game rescheduled to 19 April 2009.

15 February 2009

Newbury	P - P	Nottingham

- Postponed. Game rescheduled to 15 April 2009.

=== Round 24 ===
21 February 2009

Bedford Blues	23 - 16	Nottingham (BP)
	Report

Goldington Road
Attendance: 2,918
Referee: Andrew Small

21 February 2009

(BP) Doncaster Knights	42 - 5	Sedgley Park
	Report

Castle Park
Attendance: 1,194
Referee: Paul Knowles

21 February 2009

(BP) London Welsh	16 - 21	Exeter Chiefs
	Report

Old Deer Park
Attendance: 1,420
Referee: Keith Lewis

21 February 2009

(BP) Manchester	24 - 41	Coventry (BP)
	Report

Grove Park
Attendance: 347
Referee: Llyr Apgeraint-Roberts

21 February 2009

Moseley	26 - 37	Cornish Pirates (BP)
	Report

Billesley
Attendance: 965
Referee: Terry Hall

21 February 2009

Otley	12 - 12	Newbury
	Report

Cross Green
Attendance: 450
Referee: Dean Richards

21 February 2009

Plymouth Albion	20 - 33	Rotherham Titans (BP)
	Report

Brickfields
Attendance: 3,478
Referee: David Rose

22 February 2009

(BP) Leeds Carnegie	47 - 21	Esher
	Report

Headingley Stadium
Attendance: 2,945
Referee: Chris Sharp

=== Round 16 & Round 20 Rescheduled Games ===
28 February 2009

(BP) Coventry	29 - 24	Sedgley Park (BP)
	Report

Butts Park Arena
Attendance: 1,297
Referee: Chris Sharp

- Game rescheduled from 28 February 2009.

28 February 2009

Newbury	10 - 39	Cornish Pirates (BP)
	Report

Monk's Lane
Attendance: 433
Referee: Michael Tutty

- Game rescheduled from 13 December 2008.

28 February 2009

Rotherham Titans	19 - 40	Esher (BP)
	Report

Clifton Lane
Attendance: 1,107
Referee: Greg Garner

- Game rescheduled from 28 February 2009.

=== Round 25 ===
7 March 2009

Doncaster Knights	27 - 12	Leeds Carnegie
	Report

Castle Park
Attendance: 2,203
Referee: Stuart Dickinson

7 March 2009

Esher	23 - 17	Moseley (BP)
	Report

Molesey Road
Attendance: 1,612
Referee: Llyr Apgeraint-Roberts

7 March 2009

(BP) Exeter Chiefs	40 - 5	Manchester
	Report

Sandy Park
Attendance: 3,949
Referee: Michael Tutty

7 March 2009

Newbury	14 - 10	Coventry (BP)
	Report

Monk's Lane
Attendance: 590
Referee: Andrew Small

7 March 2009

Rotherham Titans	7 - 20	London Welsh
	Report

Clifton Lane
Attendance: 1,142
Referee: Dean Richards

7 March 2009

Sedgley Park	11 - 27	Plymouth Albion
	Report

Park Lane
Attendance: 362
Referee: Roy Maybank

8 March 2009

(BP) Cornish Pirates	5 - 6	Bedford Blues
	Report

Recreation Ground
Attendance: 4,764
Referee: Keith Lewis

8 March 2009

(BP) Nottingham	95 - 5	Otley
	Report

Meadow Lane
Attendance: 1,318
Referee: Darren Gamage

=== Round 26 ===
14 March 2009

(BP) Bedford Blues	27 - 24	Leeds Carnegie (BP)
	Report

Goldington Road
Attendance: 2,955
Referee: Rowan Kitt

14 March 2009

(2BP) Coventry	31 - 32	Rotherham Titans (BP)
	Report

Butts Park Arena
Attendance: 1,228
Referee: Andrew Taylorson

14 March 2009

Doncaster Knights	28 - 23	Plymouth Albion (BP)
	Report

Castle Park
Attendance: 1,027
Referee: Mark Wilson

14 March 2009

(BP) London Welsh	39 - 25	Otley
	Report

Old Deer Park
Attendance: 780
Referee: Paul Knowles

14 March 2009

(BP) Manchester	35 - 17	Newbury
	Report

Grove Park
Attendance: 314
Referee: Chris Sharp

14 March 2009

(BP) Moseley	51 - 17	Sedgley Park
	Report

Billesley
Attendance: 796
Referee: Keith Lewis

15 March 2009

Cornish Pirates	7 - 16	Esher
	Report

Recreation Ground
Attendance: 1,894
Referee: David Rose

15 March 2009

(BP) Nottingham	14 - 15	Exeter Chiefs
	Report

Meadow Lane
Attendance: 1,305
Referee: Adrian Hartwell

=== Round 19, 20 & 23 Rescheduled Games ===
21 March 2009

(BP) Esher	27 - 18	Coventry
	Report

Molesey Road
Attendance: 1,104
Referee: Mark Wilson

- Game rescheduled from 3 January 2009.

21 March 2009

(BP) Moseley	32 - 24	Exeter Chiefs
	Report

Billesley
Referee: Llyr Apgeraint-Roberts

- Game rescheduled from 3 January 2009. Game was also a double header - league match and EDF National Cup semi final.

21 March 2009

Newbury	17 - 50	Doncaster Knights (BP)
	Report

Monk's Lane
Attendance: 310
Referee: Michael Tutty

- Game rescheduled from 10 January 2009.

21 March 2009

Sedgley Park	0 - 64	Bedford Blues (BP)
	Report

Park Lane
Attendance: 436
Referee: Chris Sharp

- Game rescheduled from 14 February 2009.

22 March 2009

London Welsh	22 - 9	Plymouth Albion
	Report

Old Deer Park
Attendance: 390
Referee: Rowan Kitt

- Game rescheduled from 10 January 2009.

=== Round 27 ===
28 March 2009

(BP) Doncaster Knights	41 - 17	Moseley
	Report

Castle Park
Attendance: 1,438
Referee: Terry Hall

28 March 2009

(BP) Esher	76 - 10	Sedgley Park
	Report

Molesey Road
Attendance: 1,258
Referee: Dean Richards

28 March 2009

(BP) Exeter Chiefs	44 - 5	Newbury
	Report

Sandy Park
Attendance: 4,120
Referee: Chris Sharp

28 March 2009

(BP) London Welsh	57 - 10	Manchester
	Report

Old Deer Park
Attendance: 920
Referee: Luke Pearce

28 March 2009

Otley	13 - 32	Coventry (BP)
	Report

Cross Green
Attendance: 463
Referee: Tim Wigglesworth

28 March 2009

Plymouth Albion	14 - 31	Bedford Blues (BP)
	Report

Brickfields
Attendance: 3,363
Referee: Keith Lewis

28 March 2009

Rotherham Titans	20 - 6	Nottingham
	Report

Clifton Lane
Attendance: 1,237
Referee: Rob Debney

29 March 2009

(BP) Leeds Carnegie	33 - 9	Cornish Pirates
	Report

Headingley Stadium
Attendance: 3,806
Referee: Llyr Apgeraint-Roberts

=== Round 19 Rescheduled Game ===
1 April 2009

Sedgley Park	5 - 50	Nottingham (BP)
	Report

Park Lane
Attendance: 296
Referee: Andrew Taylorson

- Game rescheduled from 3 January 2009.

=== Round 28 ===
4 April 2009

(BP) Bedford Blues	42 - 20	Doncaster Knights
	Report

Goldington Road
Attendance: 3,048
Referee: JP Doyle

4 April 2009

(BP) Coventry	35 - 28	Exeter Chiefs (BP)
	Report

Butts Park Arena
Attendance: 1,229
Referee: Rowan Kitt

4 April 2009

(BP) Esher	31 - 28	Plymouth Albion (2BP)
	Report

Molesey Road
Attendance: 1,664
Referee: Greg Garner

4 April 2009

(BP) Newbury	21 - 23	Rotherham Titans
	Report

Monk's Lane
Attendance: 446
Referee: Terry Hall

4 April 2009

(2BP) Moseley	26 - 31	Leeds Carnegie (BP)
	Report

Billesley
Attendance: 832
Referee: Tim Wigglesworth

4 April 2009

(BP) Otley	29 - 18	Manchester
	Report

Cross Green
Attendance: 450
Referee: Adrian Hartwell

4 April 2009

(2BP) Sedgley Park	27 - 35	Cornish Pirates (BP)
	Report

Park Lane
Attendance: 524
Referee: Luke Pearce

5 April 2009

Nottingham	30 - 24	London Welsh (BP)
	Report

Meadow Lane
Attendance: 1,321
Referee: Paul Knowles

=== Round 20 Rescheduled Game ===
8 April 2009

Manchester	0 - 104	Leeds Tykes (BP)
	Report

Headingley Stadium
Attendance: 1,781
Referee: Darren Gamage

- Game rescheduled from 11 January 2009. Game also switched from Grove Park to Headingley in Leeds as Manchester did not have floodlights.

=== Round 29 ===
11 April 2009

(BP) Coventry	36 - 30	London Welsh (BP)
	Report

Butts Park Arena
Attendance: 1,319
Referee: Llyr Apgeraint-Roberts

11 April 2009

(BP) Doncaster Knights	50 - 25	Esher
	Report

Castle Park
Attendance: 1,322
Referee: Chris Sharp

11 April 2009

Manchester	23 - 49	Nottingham (BP)
	Report

Grove Park
Attendance: 324
Referee: Andrew Taylorson

11 April 2009

(BP) Moseley	23 - 26	Bedford Blues
	Report

Billesley
Attendance: 1,118
Referee: David Rose

11 April 2009

(BP) Rotherham Titans	35 - 21	Exeter Chiefs
	Report

Clifton Lane
Attendance: 1,749
Referee: Tim Wigglesworth

11 April 2009

(BP) Sedgley Park	36 - 29	Otley (BP)
	Report

Park Lane
Attendance: 497
Referee: Nick Williams

12 April 2009

(BP) Cornish Pirates	30 - 14	Plymouth Albion
	Report

Recreation Ground
Attendance: 4,306
Referee: Adrian Hartwell

12 April 2009

(BP) Leeds Carnegie	57 - 14	Newbury
	Report

Headingley Stadium
Attendance: 3,564
Referee: Keith Lewis

=== Round 15 & 23 Rescheduled Games ===
15 April 2009

(BP) Newbury	16 - 23	Nottingham
	Report

Monk's Lane
Attendance: 514
Referee: Paul Knowles

- Game rescheduled from 15 February 2009.

18 April 2009

Esher	21 - 32	London Welsh (BP)
	Report

Molesey Road
Attendance: 1,984
Referee: Mark Wilson

- Game rescheduled from 14 February 2009.

18 April 2009

(BP) Exeter Chiefs	80 - 17	Otley
	Report

Sandy Park
Attendance: 2,899
Referee: Michael Tutty

- Game rescheduled from 14 February 2009.

19 April 2009

Cornish Pirates	22 - 33	Doncaster Knights (BP)
	Report

Recreation Ground
Attendance: 2,437
Referee: Terry Hall

- Game rescheduled from 15 February 2009.

19 April 2009

(BP) Nottingham	55 - 0	Coventry
	Report

Meadow Lane
Attendance: 1,088
Referee: Keith Lewis

- Game rescheduled from 7 December 2008.

=== Round 30 ===
25 April 2009

(BP) Bedford Blues	50 - 8	Esher
	Report

Goldington Road
Attendance: 3,307
Referee: Llyr Apgeraint-Roberts

25 April 2009

(BP) Cornish Pirates	8 - 10	London Welsh
	Report

Recreation Ground
Attendance: 2,616
Referee: Luke Pearce

25 April 2009

Coventry	22 - 37	Nottingham (BP)
	Report

Butts Park Arena
Attendance: 1,554
Referee: Darren Gamage

25 April 2009

Exeter Chiefs	9 - 9	Doncaster Knights
	Report

Sandy Park
Attendance: 4,972
Referee: Keith Lewis

25 April 2009

Manchester	21 - 50	Moseley (BP)
	Report

Grove Park
Attendance: 387
Referee: Adrian Hartwell

25 April 2009

(BP) Newbury	27 - 30	Sedgley Park (BP)
	Report

Monk's Lane
Attendance: 603
Referee: Michael Tutty

25 April 2009

Otley	7 - 39	Rotherham Titans (BP)
	Report

Cross Green
Attendance: 1,249
Referee: Andrew Small

25 April 2009

Plymouth Albion	6 - 17	Leeds Carnegie
	Report

Brickfields
Attendance: 4,998
Referee: David Rose

=== Rounds 16, 20 & 23 Rescheduled Games ===
29 April 2009

(BP) Moseley	50 - 32	Plymouth Albion (BP)
	Report

Billesley
Attendance: 1,124
Referee: Richard Kelly

- Game rescheduled from 14 February 2009.

2 May 2009

(BP) London Welsh	50 - 37	Moseley (BP)
	Report

Old Deer Park
Attendance: 750
Referee: Michael Tutty

- Game rescheduled from 13 December 2008.

9 May 2009

Otley	0 - 20	Moseley (BP)
	Report

N/A
Attendance: N/A
Referee: N/A

- Game rescheduled from 10 January 2009 but would be cancelled by Otley due to the club having 8 players on county duty for Yorkshire. The FDR gave Moseley a 20–0, 5 point win by default.

== Total Season Attendances ==
Club	Home Games	Total	Average	Highest	Lowest	% Capacity
Bedford Blues	15	39,406	2,627	3,307	1,933	53%
Cornish Pirates	15	44,739	2,983	4,913	1,894	33%
Coventry	15	20,959	1,397	3,638	838	35%
Doncaster Knights	15	20,520	1,368	2,203	846	44%
Esher	15	15,682	1,045	1,984	380	35%
Exeter Chiefs	15	68,984	4,599	7,345	2,899	57%
Leeds Carnegie	15	48,625	3,242	5,463	2,029	15%
London Welsh	15	16,035	1,069	1,931	390	24%
Manchester	15 (Note: Manchester would play their 'home' game against Leeds Tykes in Leeds due to floodlight issues which would have the knock on effect of boosting their season attendance figures as 1,781 supporters turned up to watch this game, almost all of whom were Leeds fans.)	7,096	473	1,781	283	9%
Moseley	14 (Note: Missing home attendance v Exeter Chiefs on 21 March 2009.)	12,502	893	1,124	682	30%
Newbury	15	8,164	544	878	310	7%
Nottingham	15	22,391	1,493	2,663	1,088	8%
Otley	14 (Note: Home game against Moseley on 9 May 2009 was cancelled.)	12,194	871	2,610	450	12%
Plymouth Albion	15	51,050	3,403	6,871	1,742	52%
Rotherham Titans	15	18,727	1,248	2,548	642	50%
Sedgley Park	15	8,130	542	886	296	18%

== Individual statistics ==
- Note that points scorers includes tries as well as conversions, penalties and drop goals.

=== Top points scorers ===
Rank	Player	Team	Appearances	Points
1	(England) Jamie Lennard	Doncaster Knights	29	303
2	(England) David Jackson	Nottingham	30	261
3	(Ireland) Gareth Steenson	Exeter Chiefs	27	228
4	(England) Neil Hallett	Esher	28	224
5	(Canada) James Pritchard	Bedford Blues	20	216
6	(Italy) Alberto Di Bernardo	Leeds Carnegie	21	211
7	(England) Mark Harris	London Welsh	20	180
8	(Wales) Rhys Jones	Cornish Pirates	21	178
9	(England) Tim Taylor	Nottingham	30	176
10	(England) Michael Whitehead	Rotherham Titans	29	173

=== Top try scorers ===
Rank	Player	Team	Appearances	Tries
1	(England) Billy Twelvetrees	Bedford Blues	29	18
1	(England) David Jackson	Nottingham	30	18
2	(England) James Rodwell	Moseley	21	17
3	(England) Matthew Jess	Exeter Chiefs	18	16
3	(England) Sean Marsden	Exeter Chiefs	19	16
3	(England) Jon Feeley	Rotherham Titans	28	16
3	(Scotland) Douglas Flockhart	Esher	30	16
4	(Ireland) Paul McKenzie	Exeter Chiefs	16	15
4	(England) Wes Davies	Doncaster Knights	24	15
4	(England) Leigh Hinton	Leeds Carnegie	25	15
4	(South Africa) Errie Claassens	Rotherham Titans	27	15

== Season records ==
=== Team ===
Largest home win — 90 pts

95 - 5 Nottingham at home to Otley on 8 March 2009

Largest away win — 104 pts

104 - 0 Leeds Carnegie away to Manchester on 8 April 2009

Most points scored — 104 pts

104 - 0 Leeds Carnegie away to Manchester on 8 April 2009

Most tries in a match — 16

Leeds Carnegie away to Manchester on 8 April 2009

Most conversions in a match — 12 (x2)

Nottingham at home to Otley on 8 March 2009
Leeds Carnegie away to Manchester on 8 April 2009

Most penalties in a match — 7

Rotherham Titans at home to Exeter Chiefs on 11 April 2009

Most drop goals in a match — 3

Cornish Pirates at home to Plymouth Albion on 12 April 2009

=== Player ===
Most points in a match — 29

(New Zealand) Tim Taylor for Nottingham at home to Otley on 8 March 2009

Most tries in a match — 5

(Wales) Tom Brown for London Welsh at home to Manchester on 28 March 2009

Most conversions in a match — 12

(Wales) Jason Strange for Leeds Carnegie away to Manchester on 8 April 2009

Most penalties in a match — 7

(England) Michael Whitehead for Rotherham Titans at home to Exeter Chiefs on 11 April 2009

Most drop goals in a match — 3

(Wales) Rhys Jones for Cornish Pirates at home to Plymouth Albion on 12 April 2009

=== Attendances ===
Highest — 7,345

Exeter Chiefs at home to Cornish Pirates on 27 December 2008

Lowest — 283

Manchester at home to Esher on 31 January 2009

Highest Average Attendance — 4,599

Exeter Chiefs

Lowest Average Attendance — 473

Manchester

== See also ==
- English rugby union system
