= Champ Rugby =

Second level of English rugby union

Elior Champ Rugby
- Current season, competition or edition: 2026–27 Champ Rugby
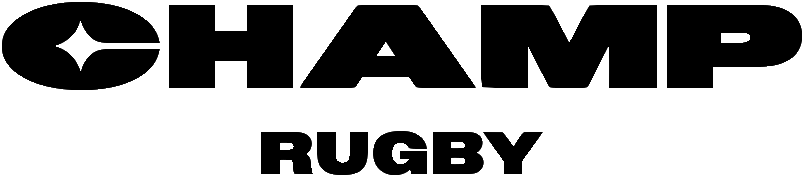
- Sport: Rugby union
- Founded: 1987; 39 years ago
- Administrator: RFU
- No. of teams: 14
- Countries: England
- Most recent champion: Worcester Warriors (4th title) (2025–26)
- Most titles: Bristol Bears; Worcester Warriors (4 titles)
- Level on pyramid: Level 2
- Promotion to: PREM Rugby (via expansion process from 2026–27 (Note: Automatic promotion to the PREM was abolished from the 2026–27 season following a vote by the RFU Council on 27 February 2026. Clubs may still enter the PREM via a criteria-based expansion process, for which having played at least one season in the Champ is a requirement.)
- Relegation to: National League 1
- Website: champrugby.com

Elior Champ Rugby (formerly the RFU Championship) is an English rugby union competition among fourteen clubs. It is the second level of men's English rugby and is played by both professional and semi-professional players. The competition has existed since 1987, when English clubs were first organised into leagues. Historically the competition provided automatic promotion to the top-flight PREM Rugby, but following a vote by the RFU Council on 27 February 2026, automatic promotion and relegation between the two tiers was abolished from the 2026–27 season. Elior Champ Rugby remains a required pathway to the PREM under the new criteria-based expansion model, under which any club seeking admission to the PREM must first have played at least one season in the Champ.

== Format ==
The fourteen teams each play one another twice (once at home and once away), the results of the matches contribute points to the league table with points awarded as follows: 4 for a win, 2 for a draw, and 0 for a loss, although a team can earn 1 bonus point for losing by 7 points or fewer and another for scoring 4 or more tries in a match. The top six teams enter the play-offs to determine the league champion, with 1st and 2nd earning home semi-finals and 3rd to 6th contesting quarter-finals; the winner, if eligible for promotion, then faces the bottom team in the 2025–26 Premiership for a chance at promotion. (Note: From the 2026–27 season, automatic promotion and relegation between the two tiers was abolished; entry to the PREM will instead be via a criteria-based expansion process.) The teams finishing 12th and 13th play a one-leg match, with the loser then facing the National League 1 runner-up to decide who remains in the Championship. The 14th-placed team is automatically relegated to National League 1 and replaced by that league's champion.

== Current league table ==
2026–27 Champ Rugby table
Pos	Team	Pld	W	D	L	PF	PA	PD	TF	TA	TB	LB	Pts	Qualification
1	Worcester Warriors	5	5	0	0	246	95	+151	37	14	4	0	24	Play-off semi-finals
2	Ealing Trailfinders	5	4	0	1	242	109	+133	38	16	4	1	21	Play-off semi-finals
3	Coventry	5	4	0	1	243	171	+72	36	26	2	1	19	Play-off quarter-finals
4	Rotherham Titans	5	4	0	1	160	191	−31	25	29	1	0	17	Play-off quarter-finals
5	Ampthill	5	4	0	1	195	195	0	29	29	0	0	16	Play-off quarter-finals
6	Cornish Pirates	5	3	0	2	182	187	−5	27	28	2	0	14	Play-off quarter-finals
7	Chinnor	5	3	0	2	180	183	−3	22	21	1	0	13	
8	Doncaster Knights	5	2	0	3	161	152	+9	24	21	1	2	11	
9	Bedford Blues	5	2	0	3	143	158	−15	22	24	2	1	11	
10	Blackheath	5	1	0	4	146	189	−43	20	27	0	3	7	
11	Caldy	5	1	0	4	176	206	−30	25	31	0	2	6	
12	Nottingham	5	1	0	4	128	206	−78	19	32	0	1	5	Relegation play-off
13	Hartpury	5	1	0	4	116	207	−91	16	31	0	1	5	Relegation play-off
14	Richmond	5	0	0	5	123	192	−69	19	29	0	1	1	Relegated

First match(es) will be played: 18 September 2026. Source:
Rules for classification: If teams are level at any stage, tiebreakers are applied in the following order:
1. Number of matches won
2. Number of matches drawn
3. Difference between points for and against
4. Total number of points for
5. Aggregate number of points scored in matches between tied teams
6. Number of matches won excluding the first match, then the second and so on until the tie is settled

== Current teams ==
Fourteen teams complete in the league – twelve of the teams from last season plus Rotherham Titans, the champions of National League One, and Blackheath, the Champ accession play-off winner. No team was promoted to the Premiership. Departing were Cambridge (14th) and London Scottish (13th / Champ accession play-off losers) both relegated to National League One.

Club	Stadium	Capacity	Area	Previous season
Ampthill	Dillingham Park	3,000	Ampthill, Bedfordshire	10th
Bedford Blues	Goldington Road	5,531 (1,700 seats) (Note: Goldington Road capacity up from 5,000 to 5,531 for the 2025–26 season with capacity crowd achieved versus Richmond on 26 December 2025.)	Bedford, Bedfordshire	2nd (lost play-off final)
Blackheath	Well Hall	1,650 (550 seats)	Eltham, London	Promoted from National 1 (play-off winners)
Caldy	Paton Field	4,000	Thurstaston, Wirral, Merseyside	11th
Chinnor	Kingsey Road	3,000 (560 seats) (Note: Chinnor upgraded their temporary 350 seater stand to a permanent grandstand containing 560 seats ahead of the 2025–26 season. Ground capacity was also adjusted to 3,000.)	Thame, Oxfordshire	5th (lost play-off QF)
Cornish Pirates	Mennaye Field	4,000 (2,200 seats)	Penzance, Cornwall	7th
Coventry	Butts Park Arena	5,250 (3,000 seats)	Coventry, West Midlands	3rd
Doncaster Knights	Castle Park	5,183 (1,926 seats)	Doncaster, South Yorkshire	8th
Ealing Trailfinders	Trailfinders Sports Ground	5,000 (2,115 seats)	West Ealing, London	1st (lost play-off SF)
Hartpury University	Hartpury Stadium	2,000	Hartpury, Gloucestershire	6th (lost play-off QF)
Nottingham	Lady Bay Sports Ground	3,700	Nottingham, Nottinghamshire	9th
Richmond	Athletic Ground	4,500 (1,000 seats)	Richmond, London	12th
Rotherham Titans	Clifton Lane	3,750	Rotherham, South Yorkshire	Promoted from National 1 (champions)
Worcester Warriors	Sixways Stadium	9,800	Worcester	Champions (won play-off final) / 4th

Locations of the 2026-27 Champ Rugby teams
2026-27 Greater London Champ Rugby clubs

== History ==
=== Precursor competitions (1987–2009) ===
The governing body for rugby union in England, the RFU, first allowed league hierarchies in 1987. This came nearly a century after leagues were first established in football and cricket, England's other two principal team sports.

The RFU's reluctance to allow leagues was based on a perceived threat to the sport's amateurism regulations: competitive leagues were seen as making clubs more likely to use incentives to attract and retain the best players.

When formalised leagues were finally permitted in the 1987–88 season, the second level was known as 'Courage League National Division Two'. The league has since had several different names before becoming the RFU Championship in the 2009–10 season.

Name of second-level competition	First season	Last season
Courage League National Division Two	1987–88	1996–97
Allied Dunbar Premiership Two	1997–98	1999–2000
National Division One	2000–01	2008–09

=== Origins (2008) ===
In November 2008, the Rugby Football Union (RFU) published a plan for a new professional tier below the Premiership. The 12-team Championship replaced the 16-team National Division One.

Level of men's rugby	Name of competition in 2008–09	Name of competition in 2009–10	Number of teams in 2008–09	Number of teams in 2009–10
Level 1	Guinness Premiership	Guinness Premiership	12	12
Level 2	National Division One	RFU Championship	16	12
Level 3	National Division 2	National League 1	14	16

To enable Level 2 to transition from 16 teams to 12, the RFU proposal called for five teams to be relegated at the end of the 2008–09 season. The relegated teams would play in the third level of rugby, known as 'National Division 2' in 2008–09 and to be known as 'National League 1' in 2009–10.

Additionally, one team would be relegated from the Premiership (Level 1 to Level 2), one team would be promoted to the Premiership (Level 2 to Level 1), and one team would be promoted from National Division 2 (Level 3 to Level 2).

The RFU Council voted overwhelmingly in favour of the new proposal, and the first Championship season started the following year, in 2009.

=== RFU Championship (2009–2025) ===
==== Promotion to the Premiership ====
Automatic promotion to the Premiership was not a consistent feature of the RFU Championship. A playoff tournament was used to decide promotion between the 2009–10 and 2016–17 seasons, as well as in the 2020–21 season.

In seasons without a promotion playoff (2017–18, 2018–19, 2019–20), the team at the top of the league was automatically promoted to the Premiership.

Season	Number of playoff teams
2009–10	8
2010–11	8
2011–12	8
2012–13	4
2013–14	4
2014–15	4
2015–16	4
2016–17	4
2017–18	No play-offs
2018–19	No play-offs
2019–20	No play-offs
2020–21	2
2021–22	No play-offs
2022–23	No play-offs
2023–24	No play-offs
2024–25	2
2025–26	2 (final season under automatic promotion/relegation system)

On 27 February 2026, the RFU Council voted overwhelmingly to abolish automatic promotion and relegation between Elior Champ Rugby and the PREM with effect from the 2026–27 season. Entry to an expanded PREM will instead be determined by a criteria-based process overseen by a newly established Expansion Review Group, assessing clubs on on-field standards, financial sustainability, commercial strength, stadium infrastructure and geographical reach. Any club seeking admission must first have played at least one season in Champ Rugby, meaning the competition retains its role as the essential gateway to the top flight.

==== COVID-19 ====
The COVID-19 pandemic caused the 2019–20 season to be prematurely ended. Final standings were based on a "best playing record formula" and promotion and relegation remained for the 1st and 12th placed clubs respectively.

The 2020–21 season was impacted by the aforementioned pandemic and as a consequence, a shorter season kicked off in spring 2021. The reduced season saw each team play each other once only with the top two teams entering a two-legged promotion playoff. There was no relegation due to cancellation of National League 1.

In February 2021, a moratorium on relegation from the Premiership into the Championship was approved and it was confirmed that the RFU were working on a review of the minimum standards criteria for promotion and the league structure from 2021–22. The moratorium was extended for a further two years in June 2021 and also could include promotion from the Championship at the end of the 2022–23 season if there was promotion in the previous season. There was also no relegation from the Championship in 2021–22.

=== Elior Champ Rugby (2025–) ===
On 15 May 2025, the Rugby Football Union (RFU) announced a new format and structure for the competition under the brand of Champ Rugby. The new format and structure saw a return of relegation to National League 1 and a potential route to the PREM, which Tier 2 board chair Simon Gillham said would create "aspiration and jeopardy". The competition was expanded to 14 teams from the 2025–26 season onwards. The new structure sees the top six sides, after the regular season, enter into a play-off phase to determine the league champions. Teams placed 12th and 13th in the table face each other in a single-leg play-off, the loser playing the runner-up in 2025–26 National League 1. The eventual winner will be in Champ Rugby for the 2026–27 season. The bottom placed side is automatically relegated to National League 1 and replaced by the National League 1 champions.

On 27 February 2026, the RFU Council voted to abolish automatic promotion and relegation between the Champ and the PREM, replacing it with a criteria-based expansion model taking effect from the 2026–27 season. The 2025–26 season will be the last in which the Champ Rugby champions could contest a promotion play-off against the bottom PREM club under the traditional system. Any club seeking admission to the PREM from the 2026–27 season, they must first have played at least one season in the competition.

On 16 March 2026 the league announced a multi-year title partnership deal with Elior being implemented over the last quarter of the season.

== Competition funding ==
The RFU Championship clubs were in dispute with the RFU over funding for the competition and claimed that each club was owed £77,000 for the past three seasons, and will be owed a further £120,000 over the next four seasons. The clubs believed they should have received £295,000 in 2009–10, rising to £400,000 by 2015–16 and further believe there was a breach of contract on the part of the RFU. The RFU stated that the original funding was an estimate and by 2015–16 the figure will be £359,400. When the RFU announced the hiatus of promotion play-offs, it also announced funding increases from both itself and the Premiership, including a new system which ties some of the new funding to each Championship side's performance in the league season. The extra funding provided prior to 2016–17 was removed prior to the 2020–21 season.

== Sponsorship ==
For sponsorship reasons, the competition was officially known as the Greene King IPA Championship between the 2013–14 and 2020–21 seasons.

On 16 March 2026 the league announced a multi-year title partnership deal with Elior. Therefore, the league has become officially known as Elior Champ Rugby for the last quarter of the 2025-26 season and beyond.

== Historic results ==
=== Courage League National Division Two (1987–1997) ===
Season	Matches	Champions	Runners–up	Relegated teams
1987–88	11	Rosslyn Park	Liverpool St Helens	No relegation
1988–89	11	Saracens	Bedford	London Scottish and London Welsh
1989–90	11	Northampton Saints	Liverpool St Helens	No relegation (Note: Due to the expansion of the Courage National Leagues for the following season there was no relegation from the 1989–90 Courage League National Division Two.)
1990–91	12	Rugby	London Irish	Richmond and Headingley
1991–92	12	London Scottish	West Hartlepool	Plymouth Albion, Liverpool St Helens
1992–93	12	Newcastle Gosforth	Waterloo	Bedford, Rosslyn Park, Richmond, Blackheath, Coventry, Fylde, Morley
1993–94	18	Sale	West Hartlepool	Rugby, Otley
1994–95	18	Saracens	Wakefield	Fylde, Coventry
1995–96	18	Northampton Saints	London Irish	No relegation (Note: Due to the expansion of the division from 10 to 12 teams for the following season there was no relegation from the 1995-96 Courage League National Division Two.)
1996–97	22	Richmond	Newcastle	Rugby, Nottingham
Green background are promotion places.

=== Allied Dunbar Premiership Two (1997–2000) ===
Season	Matches	Champions	Runners–up	Relegated teams
1997–98	22	Bedford	West Hartlepool (Note: 3rd place London Scottish were also promoted.)	No relegation (Note: Due to the expansion of the top two divisions for the following season there was no relegation from the 1997-98 Dunbar Premiership Two.)
1998–99	26	Bristol	Rotherham	Blackheath and Fylde
1999–00	26	Rotherham	Leeds Tykes	Rugby and West Hartlepool
Green background are promotion places.

=== National Division One (2000–2009) ===
Season	Matches	Champions	Runners–up	Relegated teams
2000–01	26	Leeds Tykes	Worcester	Orrell and Waterloo
2001–02	26	Rotherham	Worcester	Henley and Bracknell
2002–03	26	Rotherham	Worcester	Moseley, Rugby Lions
2003–04	26	Worcester	Orrell	Wakefield, Manchester
2004–05	26	Bristol	Exeter	Orrell, Henley
2005–06	26	Harlequins	Bedford Blues	No relegation (Note: Due to the RFU expanding the league from 14 to 16 teams for the following season there was no relegation from the 2005-06 National Division One.)
2006–07	30	Leeds Tykes	Earth Titans	Otley, Waterloo
2007–08	30	Northampton Saints	Exeter Chiefs	Pertemp Bees, Launceston
2008–09	30	Leeds Tykes	Exeter Chiefs	Esher, Sedgley Park, Newbury, Otley, Manchester
Green background are promotion places.

=== RFU Championship / Champ Rugby (2009–present) ===
Season	Matches	Champions	Runners–up	Relegated teams
2009–10	22	Exeter Chiefs	Bristol	Coventry
2010–11	22	Worcester Warriors	Bedford Blues	Doncaster Knights
2011–12	22	London Welsh	Bristol	Ealing Trailfinders
2012–13	22	Newcastle Falcons	Bristol	Plymouth Albion
2013–14	23	London Welsh	Doncaster Knights	Moseley
2014–15	22	Worcester Warriors	Yorkshire Carnegie	No relegation
2015–16	22	Bristol	Ealing Trailfinders	Rotherham Titans
2016–17	22	London Irish	Ealing Trailfinders	Richmond
2017–18	22	Bristol	Ealing Trailfinders	Yorkshire Carnegie
2018–19	22	London Irish	Ealing Trailfinders	No relegation
2019–20	15*	Newcastle Falcons	Ealing Trailfinders	No relegation
2020–21	10**	Saracens	Ealing Trailfinders	No relegation
2021–22	20	Ealing Trailfinders	Doncaster Knights	No relegation
2022–23	22	Jersey Reds	Ealing Trailfinders	Richmond
2023–24	20	Ealing Trailfinders	Cornish Pirates	No relegation
2024–25	22	Ealing Trailfinders	Bedford Blues	No relegation
2025–26	26	Worcester Warriors	Bedford Blues	Cambridge, London Scottish
Green background are promotion places. *2019–20 season ended early due to the pandemic. **2020–21 season started late due to the pandemic.

== Number of league titles ==
- Bristol Bears (4)
- Worcester Warriors (4)
- Ealing Trailfinders (3)
- Leeds Tykes (3)
- Newcastle Red Bulls (3)
- Northampton Saints (3)
- Rotherham Titans (3)
- Saracens (3)
- London Irish (2)
- London Welsh (2)
- Bedford Blues (1)
- Exeter Chiefs (1)
- Harlequins (1)
- Jersey Reds (1)
- London Scottish (1)
- Richmond (1)
- Rosslyn Park (1)
- Rugby Lions (1)
- Sale Sharks (1)

== Records ==
Note that most records are from 1996–97 season onwards (aside from league champions, promotion and relegation data) as this is widely held as the dawn of professionalism across the English club game except in a few areas. It also offers a better comparison between seasons as the division team numbers are roughly equal (for example when league rugby union first started in 1987–88 the Courage League National Division Two had 12 teams playing 11 games each, compared to 12 teams in 1996–97 playing 24 games (home & away), going up to 16 teams in 2009–10 playing 30 games, back to 12 teams playing 24 games with additional playoff games). Attendance records are from 2000 onwards unless otherwise specified.

=== League records ===
- Most titles: 4

Bristol Rugby (1998–99, 2004–05, 2015–16, 2017–18)
Worcester Warriors (2003–04, 2010–11, 2014–15, 2025–26)

- Most times promoted from division: 4

Bristol Bears (1998–99, 2004–05, 2015–16, 2017–18)
London Irish (1990–91, 1995–96, 2016–17, 2018–19)
Newcastle Red Bulls (1992–93, 1996–97, 2012–13, 2019–20)

- Most times relegated from division: 4

Rugby Lions (1993–94, 1996–97, 1999–00, 2002–03)

- Most league points in a season: 143

Northampton Saints (2007–08)

- Least league points in a season: −9

Birmingham & Solihull (2009–10) (Note: This figure is taken from the regular 2009–10 RFU Championship season and does not include the relegation group games. The minus figure came about because Pertemps Bees were deducted 15 points by the RFU for going into voluntary liquidation but were allowed to continue playing as they were granted a temporary licence. Without the points deduction the Bees would have got 6 points during the first stage of the season.)

- Most points scored in a season: 1,321

Northampton Saints (2007–08)

- Least points scored in a season: 216

West Hartlepool (1999–00)

- Most points conceded in a season: 1,298

Otley (2008–09)

- Least points conceded in a season: 252

Newcastle Red Bulls (2012–13) (Note: Figure is for regular season only and does not include playoffs.)

- Best points difference (For/Against): 978

Northampton Saints (2007–08)

- Worst points difference (For/Against): –898

West Hartlepool (1999–00)

- Most games won in a season: 30

Northampton Saints (2007–08)

- Most games lost in a season: 28

Manchester (2008–09)

- Most games drawn in a season: 5

Birmingham & Solihull (2000–01)

- Most (try) bonus points in a season: 24

Rotherham Titans (2001–02, 2006–07), Northampton Saints (2007–08)

=== Match records ===
- Largest home win: 156 – 5

Newcastle Falcons at home to Rugby Lions on 5 October 1996 (1996–97)

- Largest away win: 104 – 0

Leeds Carnegie away to Manchester on 8 April 2009 (2008–09)

- Most points scored in a match: 156

Newcastle Falcons at home to Rugby Lions on 5 October 1996 (1996–97)

- Most tries scored in a match: 24

Newcastle Falcons at home to Rugby Lions on 5 October 1996 (1996–97)

- Most conversions scored in a match: 18

Newcastle Falcons at home to Rugby Lions on 5 October 1996 (1996–97)

- Most penalties scored in a match: 9

Manchester at home to Wakefield on 15 December 2001 (2001–02)
Coventry at home to Otley on 13 November 2004 (2004–05)

- Most drop kicks scored in a match: 3

Exeter Chiefs away to Rotherham on 10 November 2001 (2001–02)
Exeter Chiefs away to Plymouth Albion on 8 September 2007 (2007–08)
Cornish Pirates at home to Plymouth Albion on 12 April 2009 (2008–09)
Worcester Warriors away to Bedford Blues on 16 October 2010 (2010–11)
Leeds Carnegie at home to Rotherham Titans on 25 November 2011 (2011–12)

=== Attendance records ===
- Highest attendance: 16,048

Bristol at home to Doncaster Knights on 25 May 2016 (2015–16)

- Lowest attendance: 150 (Note: Note that there is very little attendance data prior to the 2000-01 season so it is possible there could have been lower attendances than the ones listed.)

Bracknell at home to Exeter Chiefs on 2 March 2002 (2001–02)
Moseley at home to Rugby Lions on 23 March 2002 (2001–02)

- Highest average attendance (club): 11,494

Northampton Saints (2007–08)

- Lowest average attendance (club): 322

Birmingham & Solihull (2000–01) (Note: Note that there is very little attendance data prior to the 2000-01 season so it is possible there could have been lower average club attendances than the one listed. Also, Birmingham & Solihull were missing 2 attendance figures from this season which means their average is not 100% accurate and could be slightly lower or higher with these games accounted for.)

- Highest average attendance (season): 2,738 (2014–15)
- Lowest average attendance (season): 908 (2000–01) (Note: Note that there is very little attendance data prior to the 2000-01 season so it is possible that previous seasons had lower average attendances.)

== Player records ==
=== Championship top point scorers ===
As of the end of the games of 25 May 2016. Stats taken from 1996–97 season onwards and includes both regular league/play-off games the RFU Championship only (no cup games). Points scored includes tries, drop kicks, penalties and conversions.

Rank	Nat	Name	Years	Club(s)	Points	Apps	Ratio
1	(Canada)	James Pritchard	2001–03, 2006–16; 2004-05	Bedford Blues; Plymouth Albion	2,673	251	10.6
2	(England)	Tony Yapp	1997–98; 1999–02; 2002–09	Bedford Blues; Worcester Warriors; Exeter Chiefs	1,913	207	9.2
3	(England)	Simon Binns	1996–98, 1999–01; 2001–07	Rotherham; Otley	1,792	188	9.5
4	(England)	Leigh Hinton	1998–99; 2000–02; 2002–03; 2003–04; 2004–05; 2006–07, 2008–09	Worcester; Moseley; Birmingham & Solihull; Orrell; Bedford Blues; Leeds Carnegie	1,397	160	8.7
5	(England)	Phil Jones	2001–03; 2005–11	Orrell; Sedgley Park	1,194	197	6.1
6	(England)	Oliver Thomas	2002–03, 2006–07, 2008–09, 2010–15; 2007–08	Moseley; Cornish Pirates	1,070	175	6.1
7	(England)	Tristan Roberts	2008–10; 2010–11; 2011–14; 2015–16	Moseley; Doncaster Knights; Bristol; Ealing Trailfinders	1,063	127	8.4
8	(Ireland)	Gareth Steenson	2006–07; 2007–08; 2008–10	Earth Titans; Cornish Pirates; Exeter Chiefs	1,059	116	9.1
9	(Ireland)	**Kieran Hallett**	2004–07; 2008–11; 2011–12; 2012–	Bedford Blues; Plymouth Albion; Nottingham; Cornish Pirates	1,033	170	6.0
10	(England)	Tom Barlow	1998–99; 2002–04; 2004–06; 2006–08; 2008–09	Fylde; Plymouth Albion; Cornish Pirates; Nottingham; Rotherham Titans	922	142	6.5

(Bold denotes players still playing in the RFU Championship.)

=== Championship top try scorers ===
As of the end of the games of 25 May 2016. Stats taken from 1996–97 season onwards and includes both regular league/playoff games the RFU Championship only (no cup games).

Rank	Nat	Name	Years	Club(s)	Tries	Apps	Ratio
1	(England)	Kurt Johnson	1998-99; 1999-10	Orrell; Coventry	108	239	0.5
2	(England)	Richard Baxter	1997-10	Exeter Chiefs	105	315	0.3
3	(England)	Jon Feeley	1998-00; 2000-04; 2004-06; 2006-10	Leeds Tykes; Wakefield; Sedgley Park; Rotherham Titans	101	222	0.5
4	(England)	Nick Baxter	1997-01; 2001-06	Worcester; Pertemps Bees	98	190	0.5
5	(Canada)	James Pritchard	2001-03, 2006-16; 2004-05	Bedford Blues; Plymouth Albion	94	251	0.4
6	(England)	Wes Davies	2001-03; 2003-04; 2004-06, 2009-13; 2006-09	Orrell; Worcester Warriors; Cornish Pirates; Doncaster Knights	89	234	0.4
7	(England)	Duncan Roke	1999-01; 2001-04; 2005-07	Henley Hawks; Worcester Warriors; Cornish Pirates	77	146	0.5
8	(England)	Richard Welding	1999-01, 2002-04; 2004-05; 2005-06; 2006-07, 2008-09; 2010-11	Orrell; Sedgley Park; Cornish Pirates; Leeds Carnegie; Rotherham Titans	72	186	0.4
9	(England)	Matt Jess	2003-06; 2007-08; 2008-10	Cornish Pirates; Launceston; Exeter Chiefs	71	152	0.5
10	(England)	Leigh Hinton	1998-99; 2000-02; 2002-03; 2003-04; 2004-05; 2006-07, 2008-09	Worcester; Moseley; Birmingham & Solihull; Orrell; Bedford Blues; Leeds Carnegie	71	160	0.4

(Bold denotes players still playing in the RFU Championship.)

=== Other player records ===
- Most times top points scorer: 2

(England) Leigh Hinton for Orrell (2004-05, 2006-07)
(Ireland) Gareth Steenson for Cornish Pirates (2007-08) and Exeter Chiefs (2009-10)

- Most times top try scorer: 2

(England) Dean Lax for Rotherham (1998-99, 1999-00)

- Most points in a season: 396

(Tonga) Sateki Tuipulotu for Worcester (2000-01)

- Most tries in a season: 39

(England) Chris Ashton for Northampton Saints (2007-08)

- Most points in a match: 42

(England) Jez Harris for Coventry at home to Nottingham on 5 October 1996 (1996-97)

- Most tries in a match: 6

(England) Chris Ashton for Northampton Saints at home to Launceston on 26 April 2008 (2007-08)

- Most conversions in a match: 18

(England) Rob Andrew for Newcastle Falcons at home to Rugby Lions on 5 October 1996 (1996-97)

- Most penalties in a match: 9

(England) Marcus Barrow for Manchester at home to Wakefield on 15 December 2001 (2001-02)
(England) Matthew Leek for Coventry at home to Otley on 13 November 2004 (2004-05)

- Most drop kicks in a match: 3

(Australia) Chris Malone for Exeter Chiefs away to Rotherham on 10 November 2001 (2001-02)
(England) Danny Gray for Exeter Chiefs away to Plymouth Albion on 8 September 2007 (2007-08)
(Wales) Rhys Jones for Cornish Pirates at home to Plymouth Albion on 12 April 2009 (2008-09)
(England) Andy Goode for Exeter Chiefs away to Bristol on 26 May 2010 (2010-11)
(England) Joe Ford for Leeds Carnegie at home to Rotherham Titans on 25 November 2011 (2011-12)

== See also ==
- Rugby union in England
- PREM Rugby, the top division of English club rugby, to which Champ Rugby serves as the pathway under the expansion model
- List of English rugby union teams
