= Nick Adams (rugby union) =

English rugby union footballer

- Born: Nick Adams; 11 October 1977 (age 49) Preston, Lancashire, England
- Height: 5 ft 11 in (1.80 m)
- Weight: 18 st 8 lb (118 kg)
- University: University of Leicester

Rugby union career
- Position: Prop
Youth career
- Dorking
- Leicester Academy
Senior career
Years	Team	Apps	(Points)
- Nottingham
- Villagers
- CS Bourgoin-Jallieu
- Cornish Pirates
2006–2010	London Wasps	46	(5)
2010–2011	US Montauban		
2011–2012	Rugby Lions	24	(5)
2012–2013	Stourbridge R.F.C.		

Nick Adams (born 11 October 1977 in Preston, England) is an English rugby union player and coach for Stourbridge R.F.C.

Nick Adams' position of choice is as a prop.

He has previously played for US Montauban, CS Bourgoin-Jallieu, Cornish Pirates and London Wasps.

In April 2012, Adams won the National League 3 Midlands title with Rugby Lions in his first season. The Lions achieved the championship having won every game they played. Adams left the Lions in June 2012, joining Stourbridge Saxons as a player and coach.
