= Rob Baxter =

England international rugby union player & administrator

Rob Baxter OBE
- Born: Robert Edward John Baxter; 10 March 1971 (age 55) Tavistock, Devon, England
- School: St Thomas High School
- Notable relative: Richard Baxter (brother)

Rugby union career
- Position: Lock
- Current team: Exeter Rugby Club
Senior career
Years	Team	Apps	(Points)
	Exeter Rugby Club	275	
–	Gloucester		
–	Exeter Rugby Club		
International career
Years	Team	Apps	(Points)
- England
1998–2004	Barbarians	4	(5)
Coaching career
- Years: Team
- 2009–: Exeter Rugby Club (Director of Rugby)

Robert Edward John Baxter OBE (born 10 March 1971) is the Director of Rugby of English Premiership rugby team Exeter Chiefs. He previously played for the club for 14 years, 10 of them as captain. Baxter has also both captained and coached the Barbarians.

== Playing career ==
As a player Baxter played lock for Exeter Rugby Club for 14 years and served as the club's captain for 10 years.

== Coaching career ==
Following his retirement he moved into coaching the University of Exeter side while acting as a forwards coach for the Chiefs. Rob Baxter was appointed to the position of acting coach head coach of Exeter Chiefs following the sacking of former coach Pete Drewett in March 2009. On 7 May 2009 it was announced that Baxter would be taking over the position of Head Coach of the Exeter Chiefs. In Baxter's first season as coach, he led the team to promotion from the RFU Championship to the Premiership. Baxter's efforts in establishing Exeter as a strong Premiership side were recognised when he won the 2011/12 Director of the Year award at the Aviva Premiership awards, having also been nominated for the honour the previous season.

It was announced on 26 March 2013 that Baxter would join the England coaching team for the summer tour to Argentina and Uruguay.

In the 2016/2017 season, Baxter led the Exeter Chiefs to win the English Premiership for the first time in their history by beating Wasps in the final 23-20.

In the 2019/2020 season, Baxter led the Exeter Chiefs to win the European Rugby Champions Cup for the first time, beating Racing 92 at Ashton Gate, Bristol, in the final 31–27. Just one week later, he led the Chiefs to victory in the English Premiership for a second time, beating Wasps again at Twickenham in the final 19–13, and secured a historic English and European Cup double for Exeter Chiefs.

Baxter was appointed Officer of the Order of the British Empire (OBE) in the 2021 New Year Honours for services to rugby union.

== Personal life ==
Baxter is married to Jo and has two children, Jack and Annie. They live in Exeter, Devon. In 2017, he received an honorary Doctorate of Laws from the University of Exeter.
