= Dan Gray =

Daniel, Dan or Danny Gray may refer to:

- Dan Gray (American football) (born 1956), American football defensive tackle
- Dan Gray (footballer) (born 1989), English footballer
- Danny Gray (rugby union) (born 1983), English rugby union player
- Danny Gray (American football) (born 1999), American football wide receiver
- Slim (comedian) (born 1971/1972), British comedian born Danny Gray
