= Richard Baxter (rugby union) =

English rugby union player

- Born: Richard Baxter; 23 June 1978 (age 48) Exeter, England
- Height: 1.93 m (6 ft 4 in)
- Weight: 108 kg (17 st 0 lb)
- Notable relative: Rob Baxter (brother)

Rugby union career
- Position: Number 8
Senior career
Years	Team	Apps	(Points)
1997–2013	Exeter Chiefs	431	(630)
International career
Years	Team	Apps	(Points)
- England U21
2002–2003	Barbarians	3	(0)

Richard Baxter (born 23 June 1978) is a retired Rugby union player who played his entire professional career for his local club, Exeter Chiefs in the RFU Championship and Aviva Premiership. He made his first-team debut for Exeter Chiefs against Fylde on 11 October 1997. His position of choice is Number 8.

He announced his retirement on 2 May 2013 after playing 16 seasons, 431 games and 126 tries for Exeter.

Richard is the younger brother of Chiefs coach Rob Baxter.
