= Leigh Hinton =

English rugby union player

- Born: 21 February 1979 (age 47) Birmingham, England
- Height: 1.82 m (6 ft 0 in)
- Weight: 88 kg (13 st 12 lb)

Rugby union career
- Position: Fullback
Senior career
Years	Team	Apps	(Points)
- Exeter Chiefs
- Worcester Warriors
- Dunvant RFC
- Moseley
- Birmingham & Solihull RFC
	Orrell R.U.F.C.	29	(322)
	Bedford Blues	30	(394)
2005–2006	Newport Gwent Dragons	7	(25)
2006–2011	Leeds Carnegie	125	(480)
2011–2012	Rugby Lions	26	(315)

Leigh Hinton (born 21 February 1979) is an English former rugby union footballer. His usual position was at full-back, although he could also play at centre or on the wing.

Hinton joined Leeds on a two-year deal along with team-mate and Welsh international back-row Rhys Oakley at the start of the 2006–07 season from Newport Gwent Dragons making his début against London Welsh at Headingley on 3 September 2006.

Leeds' then director of rugby Stuart Lancaster said at the time: "Leigh is a proven points-scorer in this division, both with his boot and as a try scorer. He has had a frustrating season last year and I know he is keen to put that behind him and make a fresh start with us. He can play at full-back or in the centres and with his experience he will be excellent for our younger players to work with."

Hinton was known as 'Points Machine' when he was with Orrell R.U.F.C. and Bedford Blues in National Division One scoring over 650 points in just two seasons before moving to Newport at the start of the 2005/07 season.

The full-back has also played for Moseley Rugby Football Club and Birmingham & Solihull RFC in National Division One.

In the 2003–04 season he set new records for tries and conversions in a season for Orrell, finishing with 313 points. In the following season he was leading points scorer in the division, finishing 60 points clear of Bristol's Jason Strange and helping Bedford Blues to their Powergen Shield victory at Twickenham, scoring 9 of their 14 points in the Final.

At Newport Gwent Dragons, after making his début against Glasgow Warriors he went on to make just a further seven appearances but it was a frustrating time for Hinton, and he registered just one try and two conversions in his spell in Wales.

In his first season with the Tykes, Hinton finished the season as the top points scorer in National Division One.

Hinton was one of the stars of the failing Leeds Carnegie side that were relegated from the Premiership 2007/2008, and stayed loyal to Leeds when staying on at the club for a second stint in the first division. Hinton has just brought up 400 points for Leeds with a try against Plymouth Albion at Headingley Carnegie Stadium.

Hinton joined National Division 3 Midlands side Rugby Lions in 2011, as one of many major signings by the club, to help with their ambitions of reaching the Premiership within 5 seasons under new owner Mike Åland. He reached the 200-point landmark in his 13th appearance of the 2011–12 season against Broadstreet, the team he also hit the 300-point mark against on 14 April. On 3 March 2012, in the home match against South Leicester, Hinton broke the Lions' record for points in a season. Rugby won the league with two games remaining on 31 March 2012, with Hinton kicking 3 penalties (and receiving a yellow card) in a 19–14 win over Dudley Kingswinford. At the end of season awards dinner, Hinton was awarded a special award for having scored the most points for the Lions in the season, finishing with 315. This consisted of 12 tries, 13 penalties and 108 conversions.

In the summer of 2012, Hinton announced his retirement from Rugby.
