= Faga =

Coordinates: 13°38′37.76″S 172°11′21.79″W

Faga is a village on the island of Savai'i in Samoa. It is situated on the east coast of the island in the district of Fa'asaleleaga and the electoral district of Fa'asaleleaga 4.
