= Rugby Lions =

English rugby union club, based in Rugby, Warwickshire

Coordinates: 52.3700°N 1.2779°W

(England) Rugby Lions RFC
- Full name: The Rugby Lions Rugby Football Club
- Union: Warwickshire RFU
- Nickname: The Lions
- Founded: 1873; 153 years ago
- Location: Rugby, Warwickshire, England
- Region: Midlands
- Ground: Webb Ellis Road (Capacity: 3,200 (200 seats))
- Chairman: Mal Malik
- Coach(es): John Hemsley, Mike Howes, Chris Richardson
- Captain: Tom Kimberley
- League: Counties 2 Midlands East (South)
- 2019–20: 9th Midlands 1
Team kit

Official website
- www.therugbyfootballclub.co.uk

The Rugby Football Club, playing as Rugby Lions RFC and nicknamed The Lions, is an English rugby union club based in Rugby, Warwickshire. The club plays its home matches at Webb Ellis Road. Its developmental squad is known as the Crusaders. The club also has a ladies team known as the Lionesses. It currently competes in Counties 3 Midlands East (South) at the ninth tier of the English rugby union system, having been readmitted to the league pyramid from at the start of the 2022–23 season.

== Recent history ==
On 17 August 2012, the Rugby Advertiser released an announcement, within which was an RFU statement, which confirmed that the Lions had failed to pay off their debts in time, and had been removed from National League 2 South. It did not however say anything concerning whether or not the Lions would still compete in any division in 2012–13. At a public meeting held on 30 August, attended by over 200 people, club owner David Owen revealed that the Lions would indeed not be competing in any league for the 2012–13 season, but would instead be organising a series of friendlies. The club used the help of many supporters and local clubs to help out. With many of those present at the meeting putting their names down to volunteer. Twenty fixtures had to be fulfilled to demonstrate that the club was able to put out a side and run successfully as a club. Many former players including the clubs 'tailenders' team came together to enable the Lions to fulfill those matches.

In May 2013, it was announced that the Lions' bid to be accepted back into the RFU league system had been successful, although they were forced to rejoin at the lowest possible level, Midlands 5 West (South). On 9 August 2013, it was announced that the Lions would be featured on BT Sport's rugby programming into the new season; with the Lions' First XV travelling to the studio to participate in filming on the indoor pitch.

In a four-year span from April 2011 to September 2015, the Lions did not lose a single league fixture, winning all 60 matches in that period before their run was ended by a 31–35 defeat at Ledbury RFC in the 2015–16 season opener.

== Ground ==
The club has been based at Webb Ellis Road for almost 200 years. Ground capacity in the 1990s was stated to be 3,000 to 4,000 standing with around 200 seated. As the ground is very compact, with no banking and limited space, the lower estimate of 3,000 standing and 200 seated seems more realistic.

== Club honours ==
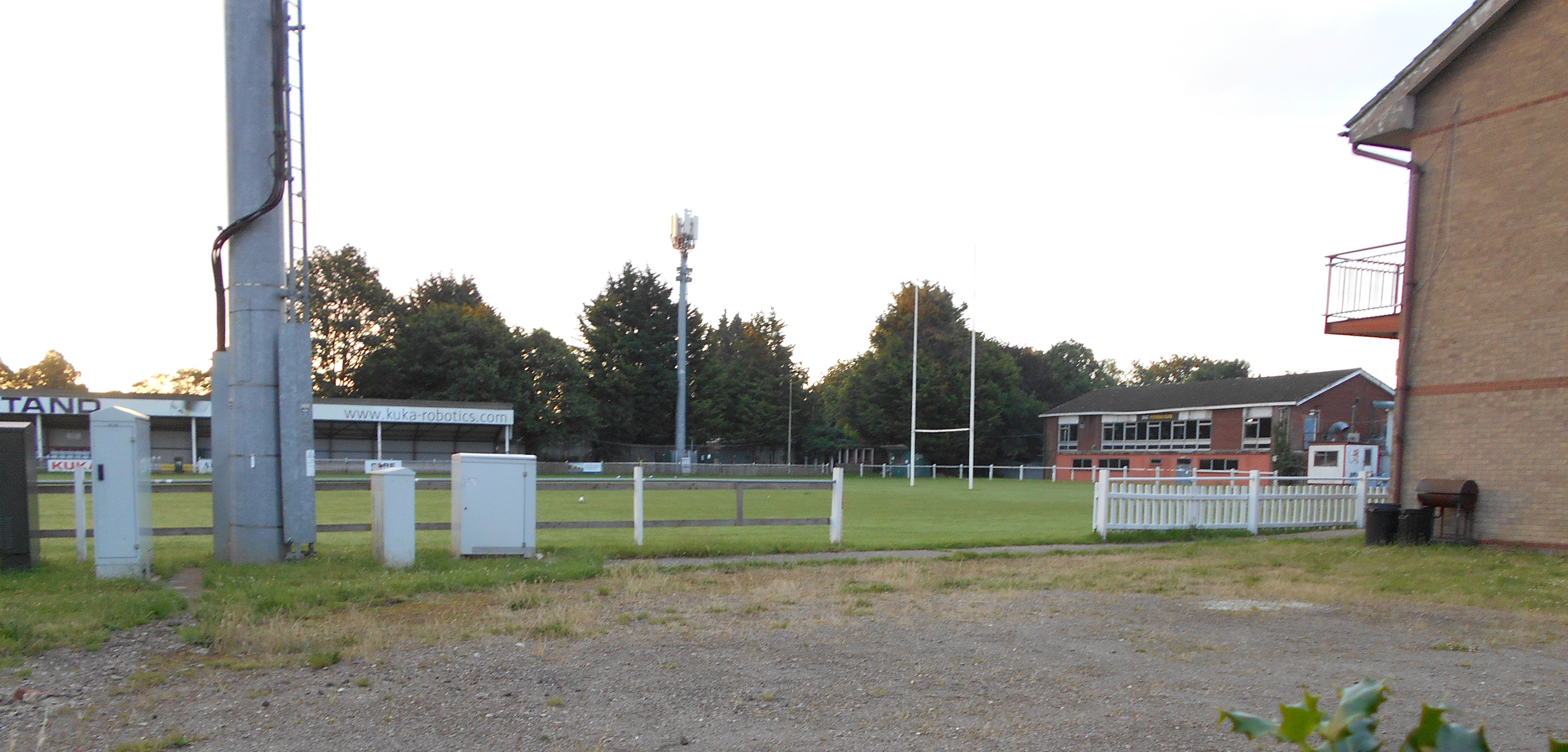
Rugby Lions ground at Webb Ellis Road, pictured in 2021

- National League 2 North champions: 1987–88
- Courage League National Division Two champions: 1990–91
- National League 3 Midlands champions (2): 2005–06, 2011–12
- Warwickshire Shield Winners: (2): 2011–12, 2014–15
- Midlands 5 West (South) champions: 2013–14
- Midlands Junior Vase Winners: (2): 2013–14, 2014–15
- Midlands 4 West (South) champions: 2014–15
- Clonmel Cup Winners: 2014–15
- Midlands 3 West (South) champions: 2015–16
- Midlands 2 West (South) champions: 2016–17

== 2011–12 season ==
In July 2011, businessman – and ex-player – Michael Aland bought the club, with an ambition to becoming a Premiership side in around 5 years. Soon after, he recruited several highly experienced players and coaches, including Neil Back (Head Coach) and Ben Gollings (Player/Backs Coach). Having been relegated to the National League 3 Midlands previous season, most players from the previous season had left the club. Players who remained with the club included Nick Walton, Ben Nuttall, Callum Tucker, Fraser Tait, Matt Mountford, Neil Davies, Paul Davies and Jack Young. This meant that almost all of the entire 2011–12 squad had to be either bought or promoted from the youth team. Some of the players brought in had been at the club before, such as Ade Hales and Beau Carney. The new additions worked, with the Lions winning every game in the first half of the season, a run they carried on into 2012. The league title was secured with two games remaining on 31 March 2012 in the home game against Dudley Kingswinford, with the Lions triumphing 19–14. The Lions also won the Warwickshire Cup, winning 10–9 in the final against Sutton Coldfield.

== Notable players (past and present) ==
- (England) Nick Adams (Ex-Montauban and Wasps)
- Steve Brain (13 England caps)
- (England) Ben Gollings (All-time top Sevens points scorer)
- (England) Leigh Hinton (Ex-Leeds)
- Launcelot Percival (3 England caps)
- Andy Vilk (England Sevens)
- (England) Peter Wackett (Ex-Leeds)
- (England) Mark Mapletoft (Ex Gloucester and Harlequins)
- To'o Vaega (Samoa National team)
- (England) Eddie Saunders (All-time record club try scorer)
- Walter Little (50 New Zealand caps)

== Seasons ==
=== Key ===
- P = Played
- W = Games won
- D = Games drawn
- L = Games lost
- F = Points for
- A = Points against
- Pts = Points
- Pos = Final position
- NL2N = National League 2 North
- MP = Midlands Premier
- M1E = Midlands 1 East
- M1W = Midlands 1 West
- M2WS = Midlands 2 West (South)
- M3WS = Midlands 3 West (South)
- M4WS = Midlands 4 West (South)
- M5WS = Midlands 5 West (South)
- NL Cup = National League Cup
- Warks Cup = Warwickshire Cup
- Mid Jnr Vase = Junior Vase Midlands Section
- Jnr Vase = Junior Vase
- Mid Int Vase = Intermediate Cup Midlands Section
- Warks Shield = Warwickshire Shield
- Clon Cup = Clonmel Cup
- W = Winner
- RU = Runner-Up
- F = Final
- SF = Semi-Finals
- QF = Quarter-Finals
- R3 = Third Round
- R2 = Second Round
- R1 = First Round

=== Season results ===
Results of league and cup competitions by season
Season	Division	P	W	D	L	F	A	Pts	Pos	NL Cup	Warks Cup	Mid Jnr Vase	Jnr Vase	Mid Int Vase	Warks Shield	Clon Cup
2009–10	NL2N	30	13	0	17	665	641	72	8th	—	—	—	—	—	—	—
2010–11	NL2N	29	3	0	26	397	1479	20	15th	R1	—	—	—	—	—	—
2011-12	MP	26	26	0	0	1242	269	127	1st	—	W	—	—	—	—	—
2012–13	—	—	—	—	—	—	—	—	—	—	—	—	—	—	—	—
2013-14	M5WS	16	16	0	0	941	84	80	1st	—	—	W	RU	—	SF	—
2014-15	M4WS	18	18	0	0	843	109	83	1st	—	—	W	SF	—	W	W
2015-16	M3WS	22	17	2	3	685	181	90	1st	—	—	—	—	R2	R3	—
2016-17	M2WS	22	18	0	4	800	350	91	1st	—	—	—	—	RU	—	—
2017-18	M1W	26	8	2	16	542	711	48	11th	—	SF	—	—	—	—	—
2018-19	M1E	26	7	0	19	612	795	48	11th	—	SF	—	—	—	—	—
2019-20	M1E	22	10	0	12	455	551	49	9th	—	F	—	—	—	—	—
