= Peter Wackett =

English rugby union player

- Born: 20 November 1987 (age 38) Harrogate, Yorkshire
- Height: 6 ft 0 in (1.83 m)
- Weight: 13 st 7 lb (86 kg)

Rugby union career
- Position: Fullback
- Current team: Rugby Lions
Senior career
Years	Team	Apps	(Points)
2007–11	Leeds Carnegie	21	(30)
2011–12	Rugby Lions	20	(55)

Peter Wackett (born 20 November 1987) is a professional rugby union player for Rugby Lions. Wackett proved to be an influential player for the Leeds Carnegie A team, scoring a winning try in their opening fixture of the 2007–08 season against Moseley. His primary position is fullback.

He was released by Leeds in summer 2011, and was signed by Rugby Lions. Wackett won the league with the Lions in his first season. He was a regular fixture in Lions' title-winning side, and proved a popular figure with the fans. Injury kept him out of most of the end of the season. After the Lions had completed their phenomenal league season - in which they won every game - Wackett was interviewed by the Rugby Advertiser, saying "The squad started as individuals and came together as a squad who played good rugby against some tough opposition."
