= Slim (comedian) =

British comedian (born 1971/72)

Danny Gray (born 1971 or 1972), known by the stage name Slim, is a British comedian.

== Career ==
Slim made his comedy debut in 1993 at the Hackney Empire, where his friend Curtis Walker was hosting a sell-out show and sent him on stage. Due to his mother's views on acceptable work, he worked as a bus driver for over 15 years of his comedy career. In 2005, he was the first Black British comedian to play The Comedy Store in Hollywood. He has been a support act for African American comedians touring the UK, such as Kevin Hart and Eddie Griffin. He was also the first Black British comedian to perform a solo sell-out show at the London Palladium. In 2026, he wrote and performed Slim's Guide to Life, a six-part series on BBC Radio 4 reflecting on his life and career.

Slim's comedy material is based on his Jamaican family, life in South London, and his anecdotes as a bus driver. He was inspired by 1990s African American-led comedy films such as Jungle Fever and Boyz n the Hood.

== Personal life ==
Slim has six children; the first was born when he was 17, and he became a grandfather around the age of 40. He considered emigrating to the United States in 2008, but his youngest child did not want to move.
