= Palei =

Palei may refer to:

- Marina Anatolyevna Palei (née Spivak; born 1955), Russian-speaking Dutch writer
- Wapei–Palei languages, a branch of the Torricelli language family, spoken in Papua New Guinea
- Palei-Aike Volc Field, an Argentine volcanic field near Chile

== See also ==
- Paley (disambiguation)
