= 18th century in philosophy =

This is a timeline of the 18th century in philosophy.

== Events ==
- The Age of Enlightenment
- 1700 - Gokulanatha Upadhyaya was made court pandit to Maharaja Madhave Sinha of Mithila.
- 1743 - The American Philosophical Society (APS) was founded.

== Publications ==
- 1700 - Historia religionis veterum Persarum, Thomas Hyde.
- 1700 - De Origine Juris Romani, Giovanni Vincenzo Gravina.
- 1700 - Some Reflections on Marriage, Mary Astell.
- 1702 - The Lives of the Ancient Philosophers.
- 1704 - Moderation Truly Stated, Mary Astell.
- 1725 - The New Science, Giambattista Vico.
- 1739-40 - A Treatise of Human Nature, David Hume.
- 1748 - An Enquiry Concerning Human Understanding, David Hume.
- 1748 - The Spirit of the Laws, Montesquieu.
- 1748 - Man a Machine, Julien Offray de La Mettrie.
- 1751 - An Enquiry Concerning the Principles of Morals, David Hume.
- 1756 - A Vindication of Natural Society, Edmund Burke.
- 1757 - Philosophical Enquiry into the Origin of our Ideas of the Sublime and Beautiful, Edmund Burke.
- 1759 - The Theory of Moral Sentiments, Adam Smith.
- 1759 - Candide, ou l'Optimisme, Voltaire.
- 1763 - The Only Possible Argument in Support of a Demonstration of the Existence of God, Immanuel Kant.
- 1774 - On American Taxation, Edmund Burke.
- 1776 - The Wealth of Nations, Adam Smith.
- 1776 - Common Sense, Thomas Paine.
- 1780 - An Introduction to the Principles of Morals and Legislation, Jeremy Bentham.
- 1781 - Critique of Pure Reason, Immanuel Kant.
- 1785 - Groundwork of the Metaphysics of Morals, Immanuel Kant.
- 1785 - The Principles of Moral and Political Philosophy, William Paley.
- 1786 - Metaphysical Foundations of Natural Science, Immanuel Kant.
- 1788 - Critique of Practical Reason, Immanuel Kant.
- 1790 - Reflections on the Revolution in France, Edmund Burke.
- 1794 - View of the Evidences of Christianity, William Paley.
- 1797 - Metaphysics of Morals, Immanuel Kant.
- 1798 - Anthropology from a Pragmatic Point of View, Immanuel Kant.
- 1798 - An Essay on the Principle of Population, Thomas Robert Malthus.

== Births ==
- 1700 - Johann Christoph Gottsched (d.1766), German philosopher and critic.
- 1703 - Jonathan Edwards (d.1758), Anglican revivalist preacher and philosopher.
- 1709 - Julien Offray de La Mettrie (d.1751), French materialist philosopher and physician.
- 1711 - David Hume (d.1776), Scottish philosopher, economist and historian.
- 1723 - Adam Smith (d.1790), Scottish economist and philosopher.
- 1724 - Immanuel Kant (d.1804), German philosopher and anthropologist.
- 1725 - Giacomo Casanova (d.1798), Venetian playwright and philosopher.
- 1729 - Edmund Burke (d.1797), Anglo-Irish philosopher and politician.
- 1737 - Thomas Paine (d.1809), American founding father and political philosopher.
- 1743 - Thomas Paley (d.1805), English Anglican clergyman, Christian apologist, philosopher, and utilitarian.
- 1743 - Thomas Jefferson (d.1826), American founding father and political philosopher.
- 1748 - Adam Weishaupt (d.1830), German philosopher and founder of the Bavarian Illuminati.
- 1748 - Jeremy Bentham (d.1832), English philosopher and social reformer regarded the founder of utilitarianism.
- 1748 - Dietrich Tiedemann (d.1803), German philosopher and historian.
- 1748 - Adamantios Korais (d.1833), Greek liberal scholar and philosopher.
- 1748 - Olympe de Gouges (d.1793), French philosopher and political activist.
- 1766 - Thomas Robert Malthus (d.1834), English economist and political theorist.
- 1776 - Sophie Germain (d.1831), French physician, mathematician and philosopher.
- 1781 - Adelbert von Chamisso (d.1838), German poet, writer and botanist.
- 1781 - Karl Christian Friedrich Krause (d.1832), German philosopher whose doctrines became known as Krausism.
- 1781 - Bernard Bolzano (d.1848), Bohemian mathematician, logician, philosopher, theologian and Catholic priest.

== Deaths ==
- 1703 - Thomas Hyde (b.1638), English orientalist, linguist and classicist.
- 1704, John Locke (b.1632), English physician and philosopher known as the "father of liberalism".
- 1718 - Giovanni Vincenzo Gravina (b.1664), Italian scholar and jurist.
- 1748 - Jean-Jacques Burlamaqui (b.1694), Genevan legal and political theorist.
- 1751 - Julien Offray de La Mettrie (b.1709), French materialist philosopher and physician.
- 1755 - Montesquieu (b.1689), French historian and political philosopher.
- 1758 - Jonathan Edwards (b.1703), Anglican revivalist preacher and philosopher.
- 1766 - Johann Christoph Gottsched (b.1700), German philosopher and critic.
- 1776 - David Hume (b.1711), Scottish philosopher, economist and historian.
- 1778 - Voltaire (b.1694).
- 1790 - Adam Smith (b.1723), Scottish economist and philosopher.
- 1793 - Olympe de Gouges (b.1748), French philosopher and political activist.
- 1797 - Edmund Burke (b.1729), Anglo-Irish philosopher and politician.
- 1798 - Giacomo Casanova (b.1725), Venetian playwright and philosopher.

== See also ==
- List of centuries in philosophy

== Sources ==
- Baines, Paul; Ferraro, Julian; Rogers, Pat (2010). The Wiley‐Blackwell Encyclopedia of Eighteenth‐Century Writers and Writing 1660 ‐ 1789. Wiley-Blackwell. ISBN 978-1-4051-5669-1.
- Garrett, Aaron, ed. (2014). The Routledge Companion to Eighteenth Century Philosophy. Routledge. ISBN 978-0-415-77489-5.
- Haakonssen, Knud, ed. (2006). The Cambridge History of Eighteenth-Century Philosophy. Cambridge University Press. ISBN 978-0-521-41854-6.
- Beck, Lewis White, ed. (1966). 18th-Century Philosophy. The Free Press. ISBN 978-0-02-902100-2.
- Huang, Jinxing (1995). Philosophy, Philology, and Politics in Eighteenth-Century China: Li Fu and the Lu-Wang School Under the Ch'ing. Cambridge University Press. ISBN 978-0-521-52946-4.
