= Henry Perkins =

Henry Perkins may refer to:

- Henry Perkins (cricketer) (1832–1916), English cricketer, cricket administrator and lawyer
- Henry Farnham Perkins (1877–1956), American zoologist and eugenicist
- Henry Perkins (brewer) (died 1855), English brewer and bibliophile
