= Anchor Brewhouse =

Former brewery in Shad Thames, London

Coordinates: 51.504148°N 0.075209°W

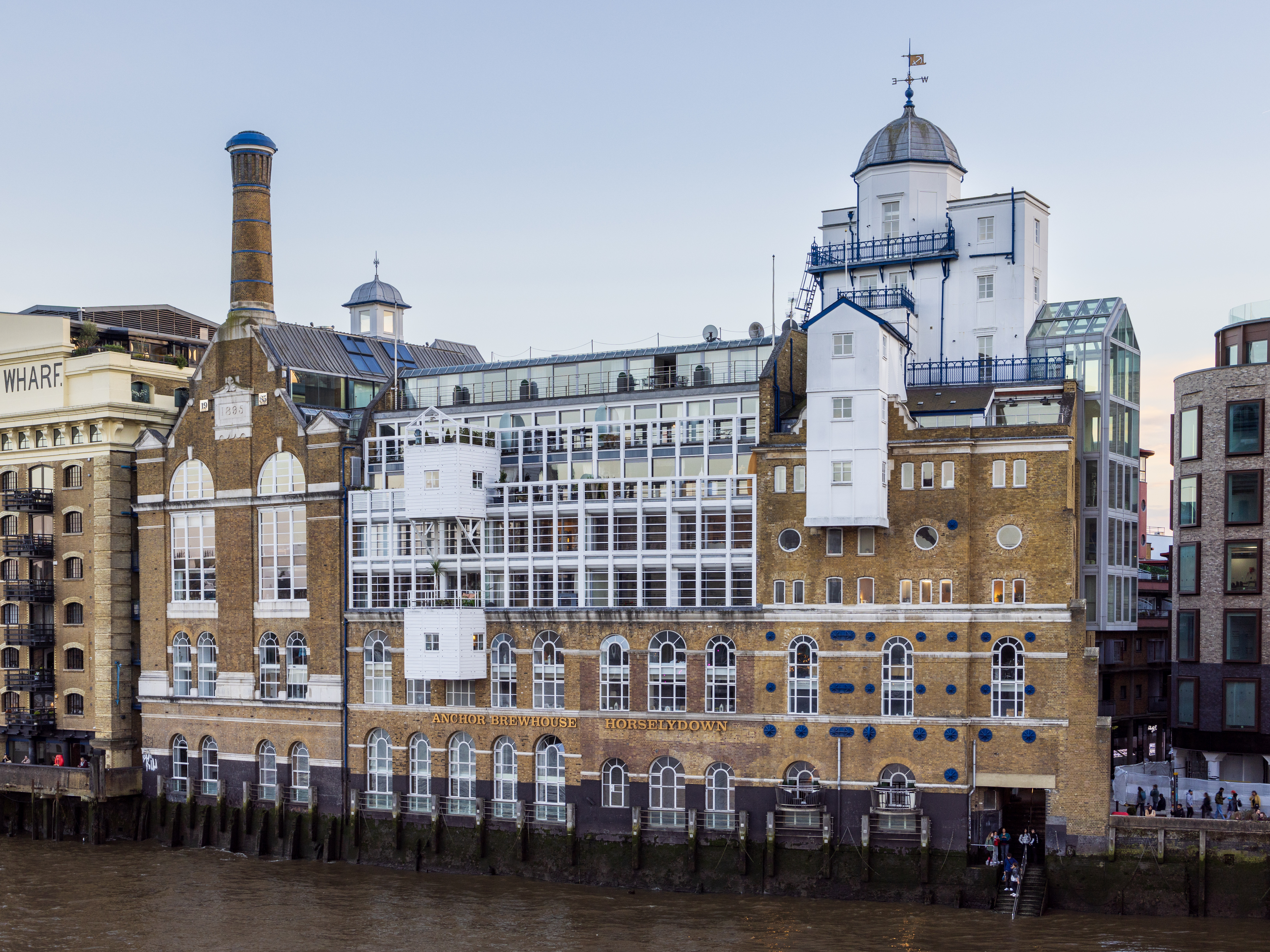
Anchor Brewhouse

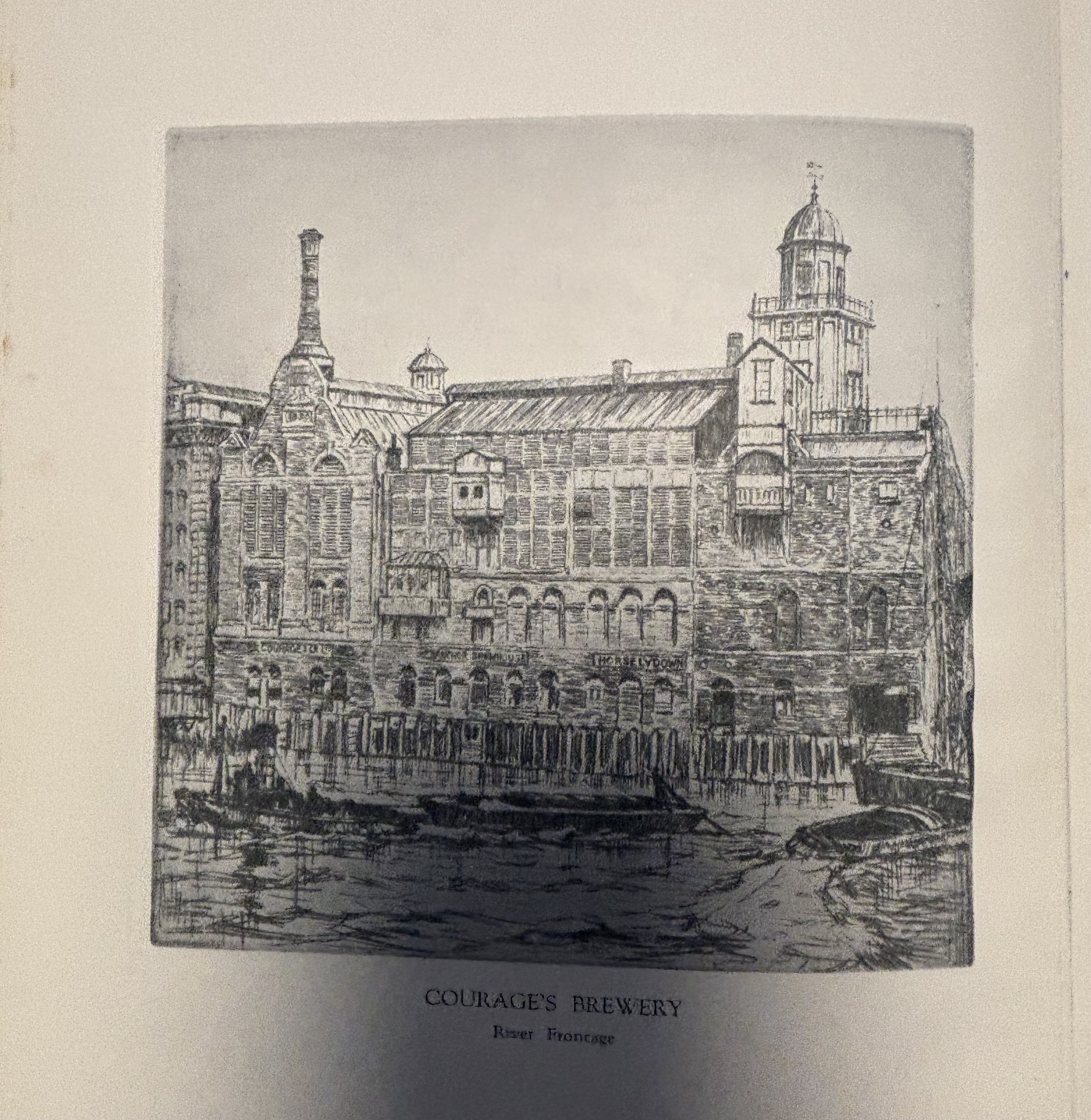
Engraving of Anchor Brewhouse c. 1930s

The Anchor Brewhouse was a small brewery by Shad Thames in Horsleydown, near Tower Bridge in London. The brewhouse was bought in December 1787 by John Courage and a group of his friends from John and Hagger Ellis for £615 13s.11d.

The original Anchor Brewhouse consisted of the brewery, offices, stabling for shire horses, cellars and cooperage covering around 4 acres of riverside frontage on the Surrey side of the Thames.

In 1885, the Corporation of London (Tower Bridge) Act was passed. This authorised construction of Tower Bridge. The southern approaches to the bridge ran through the site of the Anchor Brewhouse and some land and buildings on the site were purchased from Courage by the Corporation of London.

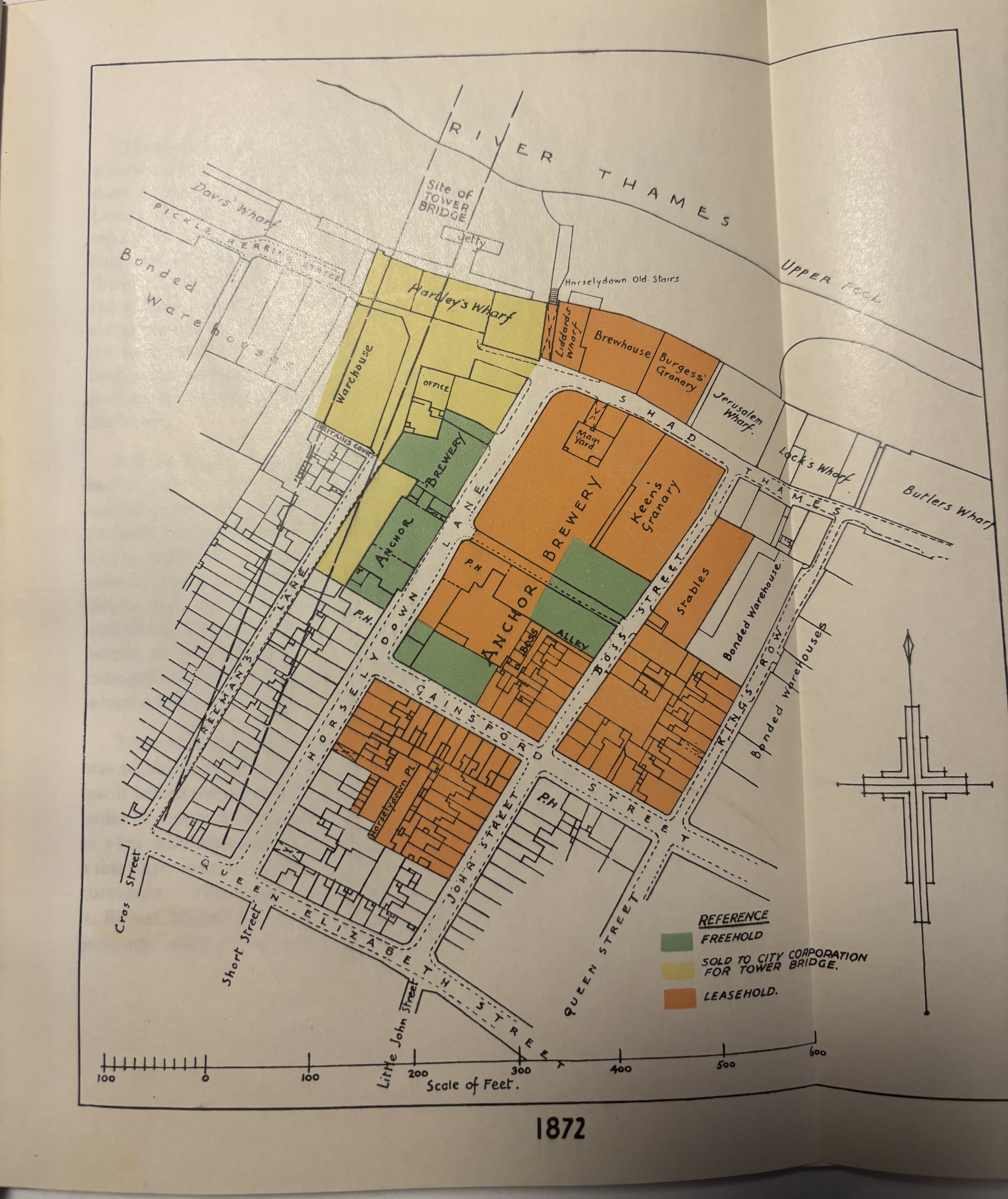
Layout of Anchor Brewhouse, Southwark 1872

On 5th May 1891, the Anchor Brewhouse was destroyed by a fire. The fire was probably started by a spark in the malt mills which caused an explosion and ignition of malt dust destroying the brewhouse with a fire raging for several days.

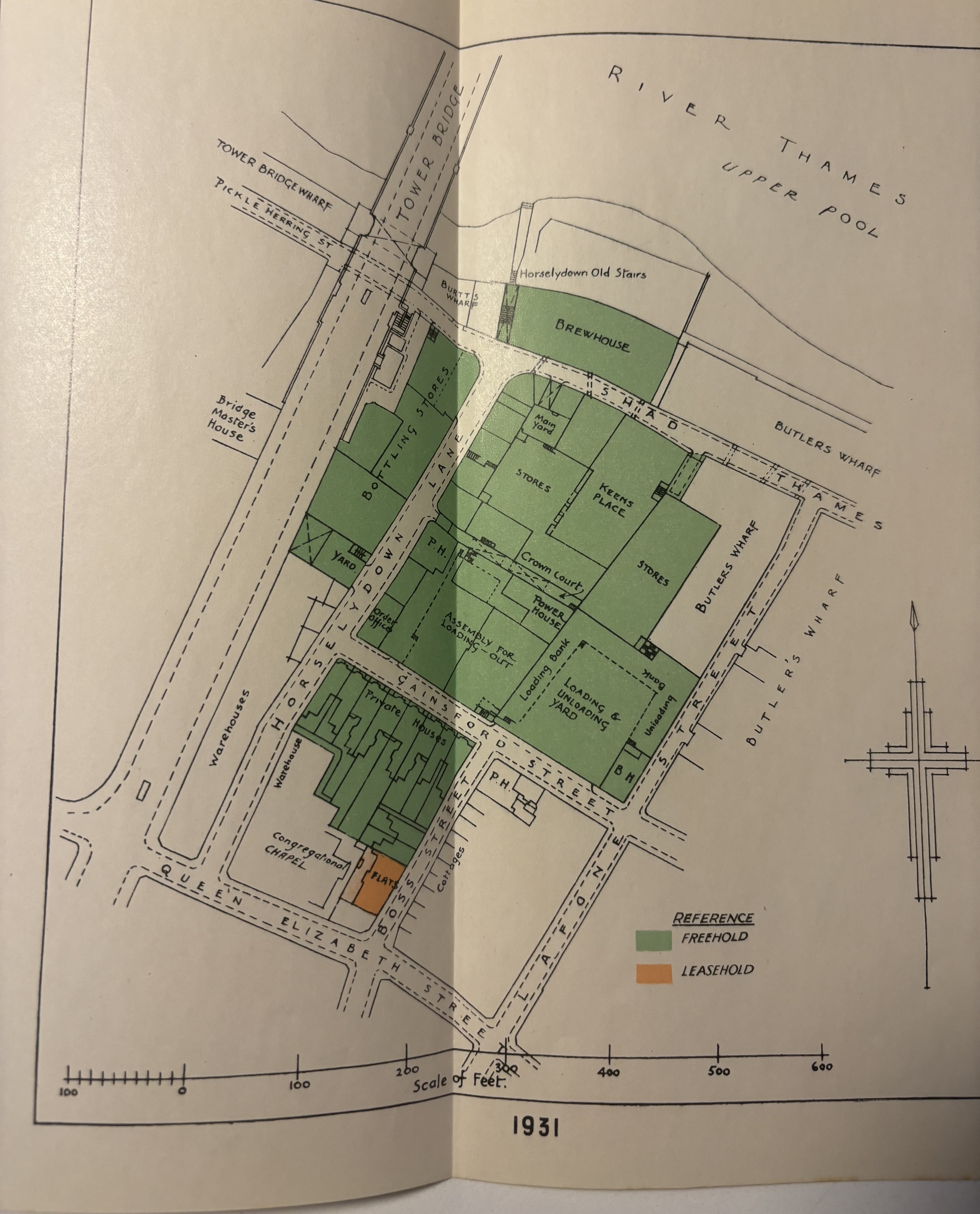
Layout of Anchor Brewhouse Southwark 1931

The fire necessitated the rebuilding of the property. In 1891, lease arrangements for some of the land on which the Anchor Brewhouse is situated were renegotiated and a new 99-year lease was granted by the owners, the Abdy family. The rebuilding of the waterside premises was carried out in accordance with plans drawn up by Messrs. Inskip and Mackenzie and were completed by Mr W Watson at a cost of £15,524. A new malt tower and chimney shaft were built bearing the date 1895. A new steam cooperage for making and cleansing the firm's casks was also installed at this time.

In 1925, Courage acquired the freehold of the Anchor Brewhouse from Mr. R. Abdy by purchasing the reversion of the lease at £1,900 annual rent which was due to expire in 1990. This greatly increased the value of the site and Courage could redevelop the site by rebuilding the part lying east of Horselydown Lane, including Boss Street, which was acquired from Bermondsey Borough Council. Redevelopment included a new assembly and loading-out yard and was constructed to plans produced by the company's own Surveyor's Department.

In 1955, the Courage Brewery merged with the nearby Anchor Brewery, then owned by Barclay, Perkins & Co Ltd. The company changed its name to become Courage, Barclay & Co Ltd. The Anchor Brewery was closed and the site converted into a bottling and packing plant with Courage's brewing operations in London consolidated at Anchor Brewhouse.

The 1970s saw a move towards consolidation of brewing at so-called "mega-keggeries". In 1978, Courage opened the Worton Grange facility in Reading, Berkshire which put in chain a series of closures and disposals of the existing operational breweries. As a result brewing operations were transferred to Worton Grange from the Anchor Brewhouse and all brewing ceased in 1981.

The Anchor Brewhouse's building still stands. The Boilerhouse, Brewhouse and Malt Mill still show the different functions in the process of beer making. The building is an expression of historical continuity, for brewing on the river has always been an important features of London's Thames-side. Brewing in Southwark is mentioned by Chaucer, and in Horselydown by Shakespeare.

The building was restored and reconstructed in 1985-1989 and converted into luxury residential flats. It is situated in the Tower Bridge Conservation Area in Butler's Wharf. The Anchor Tap pub that was the brewery tap is still open nearby. The pub is run by Samuel Smith Old Brewery.

== Awards ==
- Europa Nostra Diploma of Merit 1989
- Civic Trust Award 1991

== Gallery ==
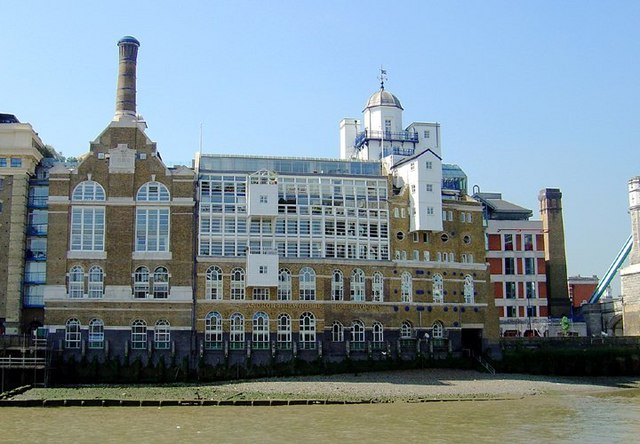
Riverside view

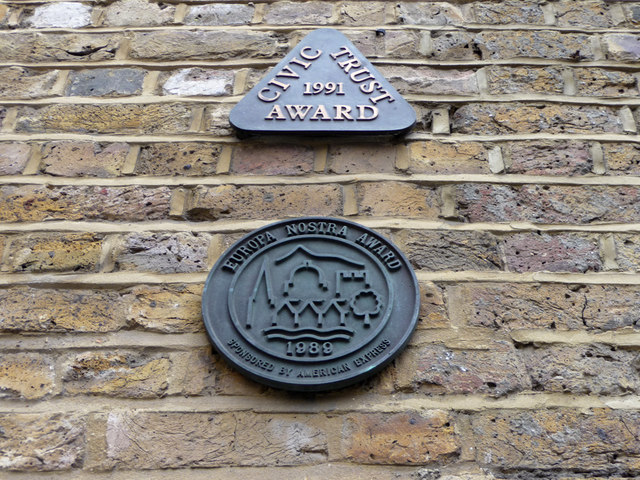
Civic Trust Award and Europa Nostra Diploma of Merit plaques

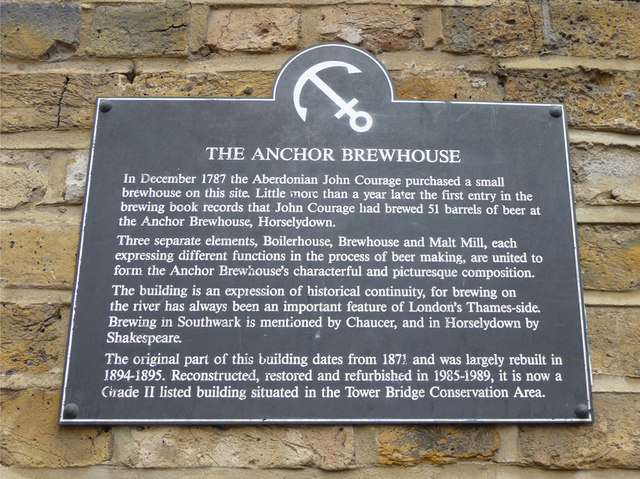
External plaque

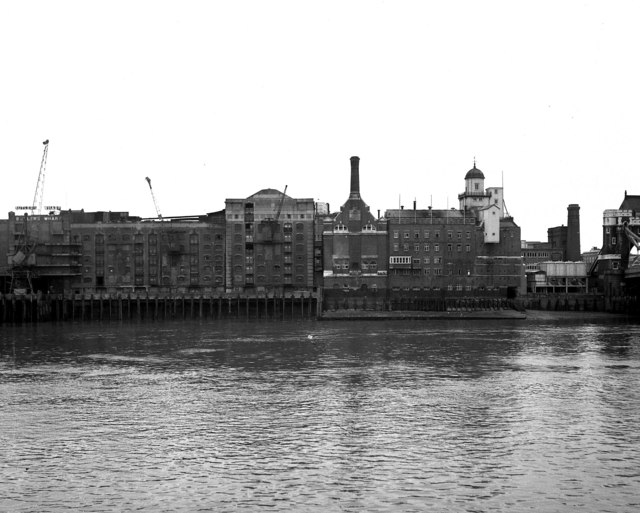
View across the Thames just downstream of Tower Bridge. This photograph was taken in 1971.
