= Henry Perkins (brewer) =

English book collector and brewer

Henry Perkins (c.1777–1855) was an English brewer, known as a bibliophile.

== Early life ==
He was the son of John Perkins (died 1812), and his wife Amelia, John being a partner in the Anchor Brewery, Southwark with the Quaker group of David Barclay of Youngsbury, Robert Barclay, and Silvanus Bevan III, Amelia's relations. The Thrale family were involved in the sale, and Henry and his brother Frederick Perkins (1780–1860) have been identified as the sons of John Perkins who were tutored by Samuel Parr, at the expense of Hester Thrale.

Perkins himself became a partner in the firm of Barclay, Perkins, & Co., brewers. He had a 12.5% share, in what was a lucrative business, but was not very active in its management.

Perkins was elected a fellow of the Linnean Society in 1825, and was also a fellow of the Geological Society and Horticultural Society of London. He was a member of the Astronomical Society of London (now the Royal Astronomical Society) in 1822.

== Family ==
Perkins married in 1803 Susannah Latham; they had one son and three daughters. Of the daughters:

- Matilda married first (Frederick) Oswald Perkins, a first cousin marriage to the son of her uncle Frederick, and after his death, Edward Richard Bagot, son of Richard Bagot.
- Sophia married in 1833 Thomas Paley.
- Selina (died 1858) married in 1837 John Scriven (1808–1878).

The son, Algernon, married in 1835 Sophia Clementina Soltau, daughter of William Soltau. He left no children, and under his will the main beneficiaries, besides his wife who survived him, were his two surviving sisters, and his nephews Raymond South Paley and John Bagot Scriven.

== The Perkins Library ==
=== History ===
Perkin's interest in books has been attributed to publicity surrounding the sale of the 3rd Duke of Roxburghe's library in 1812/3. It was not until 1823, however, that he began to establish a personal collection at Springfield, his then residence near Tooting, Surrey. The library is considered to have been founded in 1824, with acquisitions made at sale of the Mark Masterman Sykes's collection. It was further enlarged in 1827, when the library of John Dent (d. 1826) was put up for auction. Perkins also appointed Messrs. John and Arthur Arch (of 61 Cornhill, London) to supply rare and valuable books. The main purchases were completed by 1830.

His brother Frederick began to collect Shakespearean works around 1825, and his collection was eventually sold by Sotheby's in 1889.

=== Catalogue ===
The Perkins library was sold by Gadsden, Ellis, & Co. at Hanworth on 3, 4, 5, and 6 June 1873, the 865 lots producing £26,000, then the largest sum ever realised for a library on that scale. Included were:

==== Books ====
- The Mazarin Bible, two volumes, printed on vellum, purchased for £504, sold for £3,400; another copy, on paper, obtained for £195, brought £2,690;
- Biblia Sacra Latina, two volumes, printed on vellum in 1462, the first edition of the Latin Bible with a date, bought at Dent's sale for £173 5s., sold for £780.
- Miles Coverdale's Bible, 1535, imperfect, but no perfect copy known, purchased for £89 5s., brought £400.

==== Manuscripts ====
- John Lydgate's Sege of Troy on vellum, which cost £99 15s., which went for £1,370;
- Les Œuvres Diverses de Jean de Meun, a fifteenth-century manuscript of 200 leaves, which brought £690; and
- Les Cent Histoires de Troye, by Christine de Pisan, on vellum, with 115 miniatures, executed for Philip the Bold, which sold for £650.

== House and estate ==
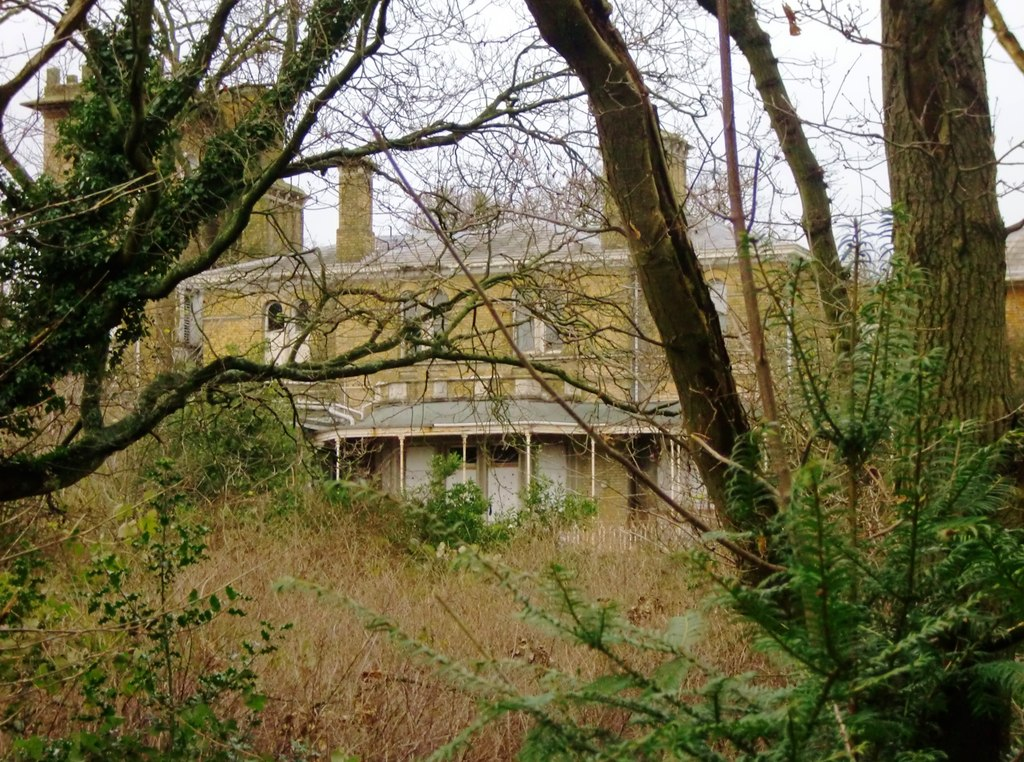
Hanworth Park House today

The Hanworth Park estate was broken up gradually by Paine & Brettell, solicitors, from 1873. Hanworth Park House, built c.1820, went in 1874 to Alfred Lafone. The lodges, by Thomas Cundy the elder, were demolished. Additions had been made in 1857, the west wing and clocktower.

== Later life and death ==
Perkins moved to Hanworth Park, Middlesex around 1836. He died at Dover on 15 April 1855, and his library went to his son, Algernon Perkins, who died in 1870.
