= Courage Brewery =

English brewery founded in 1787

Courage Limited
- Industry: Brewing
- Predecessor: Courage Brewery; Courage & Donaldson; Courage & Co. Limited; Courage & Barclay Ltd; Courage, Barclay, Simonds & Co. Ltd
- Founded: 1787
- Founder: John Courage
- Products: Beer
- Owner: Carlsberg Britvic
- Website: https://couragebeers.co.uk

Courage was an English brewery, founded by John Courage in London, England, in 1787.

== History ==
=== Origin and family ownership ===
The Courage Brewery was started by John Courage (1 October 1761 – October 1797). He was a Scottish shipping agent believed to be of French Huguenot descent hailing from Aberdeen, although other sources suggest his family may have originated from Flanders, as there were no records of French Huguenot immigration to Aberdeen and there was a stronger tradition of brewing in that region.

John Courage moved to London in or about 1780 to become an agent for the Glasgow shipping firm of Carron. His work was located at Glasgow Wharf (just downstream from the Tower of London). From his workplace, he could see the brewing operations in Southwark which encouraged him to diversify his interests into the brewing industry.

On 20 December 1787, John Courage, together with a group of friends purchased the Anchor Brewhouse in Horsleydown, Bermondsey, from John and Hagger Ellis for £615 13s.11d.

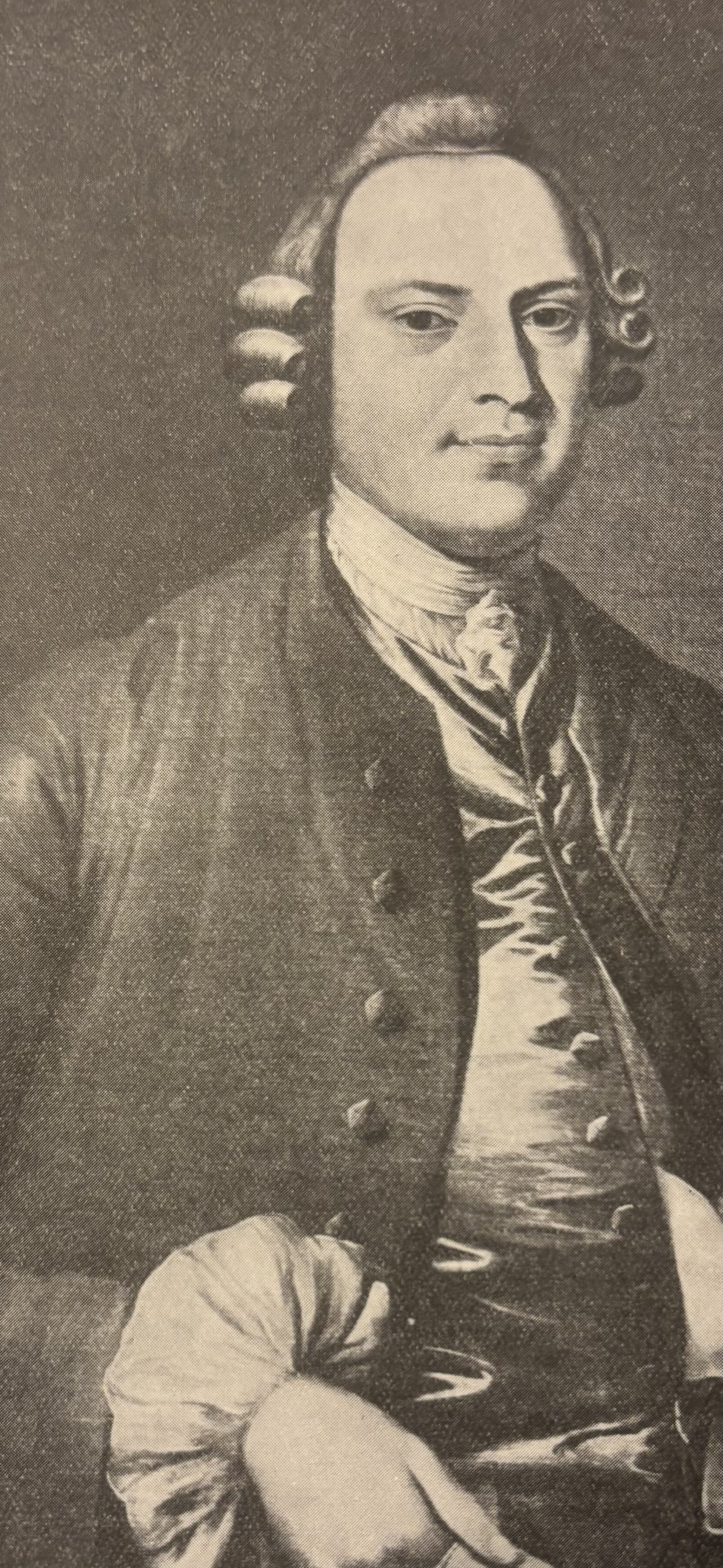
Portrait of John Courage (1761–1797)

John Courage died suddenly at the age of 36 in 1797 and was buried at St. John's, Horsleydown. In 1786, he had married Harriot (née Stewart or Murdoch) (1765–1797/98) and the couple had four children, John (Junior), Ann, Elisabeth and Harriet On John's death, his wife took over the running of the business until her own death.

Since the four Courage children were still young (the eldest, John, was only 9 years old at the time of Harriet's death), John Donaldson, the Managing Clerk, took over running the day-to-day business and care for the children. In 1800, John Donaldson was named a partner and the business was renamed Courage & Donaldson reflecting the effective partnership. Profits were initially split with Donaldson receiving a third, which was subsequently amended to half of profits and half of the capital of the business. John Courage Junior (26 June 1788 – 8 March 1854) joined the business in 1804 at the age of 14 and became a partner in the business in 1811. John the Second married Susan, the daughter of a Norfolk brewer, Sidney Hawes of Coltishall in 1823. The Courages lived at De Crespigny Terrace, Camberwell and had ten children.

In 1836 John Donaldson retired from the business and his share was transferred to his son Thomas and his brother Robert joined in 1841. In 1851, the Donaldson family withdrew from management.

In 1852, John Courage Junior and his sons Robert and John (the third) (25 January 1829 – 1861) then took over the business in partnership. On John Courage Junior's death, the sons carried on, and in 1856 a further partnership was formed when John (the third) and Robert (1830–1894) admitted Edward (1833–1904) into the partnership. Following John (the third)'s death, the partnership was reconstituted again, when Henry Courage was admitted. One final change to the partnership was made in 1882 with the admission of Robert's son, Robert Michell Courage (died 1887).

Robert Courage acted as Chairman of the limited company between 1888 and 1894 followed on his death by Edward Courage who acted as Chairman from 1894 to 1904. Edward Courage resided for nearly all his life at Shenfield Place, Shenfield, Essex. Having entered the business in 1856, he became a partner in 1889. Following the death of Edward Courage, he was followed as Chairman by his son, Old Etonian Raymond Courage (1866–1951), Lord of the manor of Edgcote from 1926 until his death. Raymond Courage was the great-grandson of John Courage.

Raymond Courage was succeeded by his son, Richard Courage (1913–1994), as Chairman of the company throughout the 1950s to the 1970s.

=== Incorporation and expansion of the business (1888 – World War II) ===
With London's population growing from around 1 million in 1800 to around 6.9 million in 1900, demand for beer in the city grew exponentially throughout the century. By 1887, the annual production ("barrelage") of Courage had reached 300,000 barrels. The growth in the size of the business probably led to Courage & Co. Limited becoming registered as a Limited Liability Company on 28 April 1888, and the company became simply known as "Courage". On 21 May 1889, Messrs, Prescott, Cave, Buxton, Loder & Co. Ltd. issued a prospectus for floating the company with a total capital of £1.5 million with £0.6 million of debenture stock. In 1897, a further £0.4 million of debenture stock was raised.

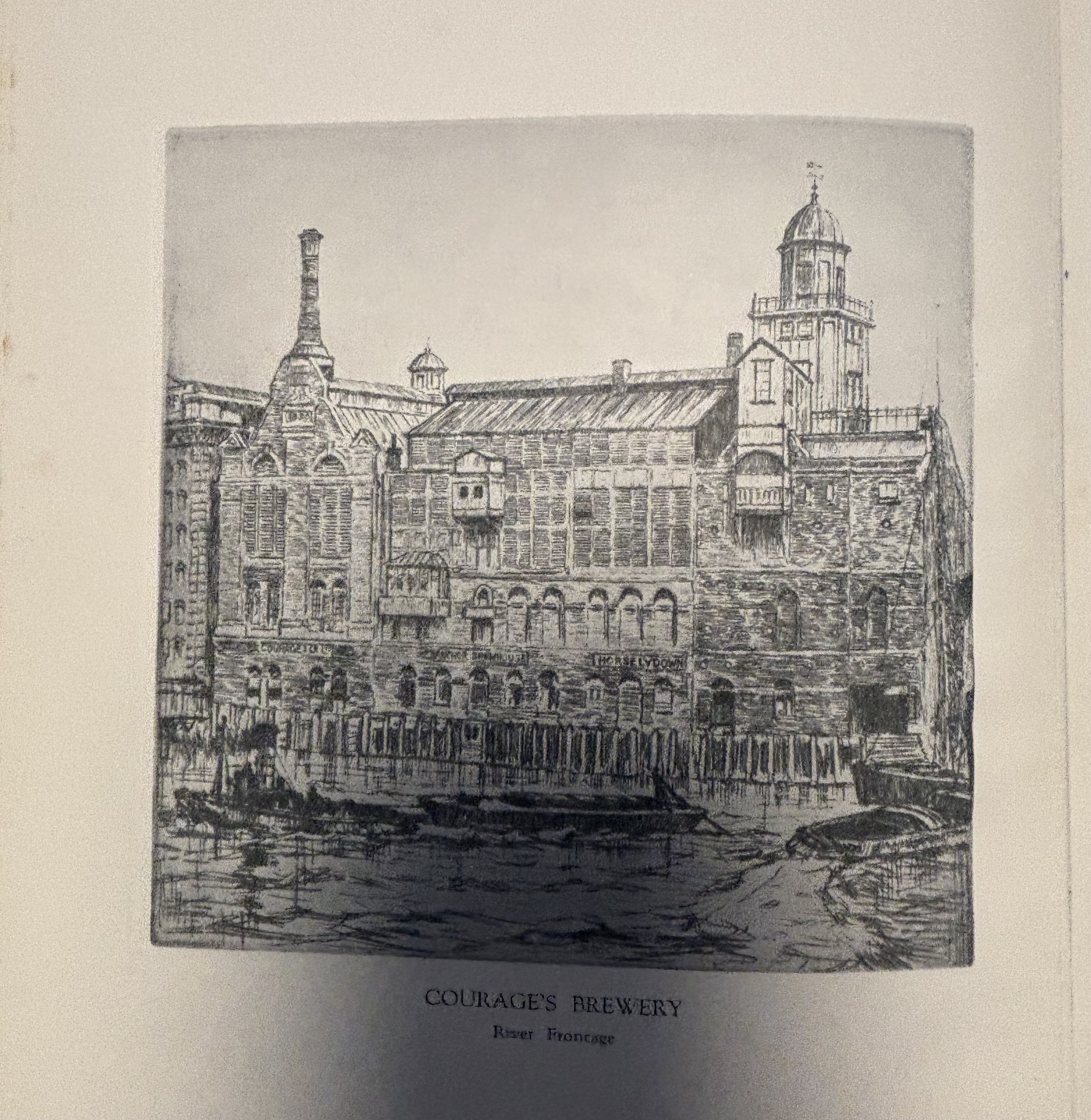
Engraving of Anchor Brewhouse

As with many other brewers, the Company initially operated as a supplier of public houses rather than owning a significant estate of its own. The public houses were owned by the licensed victualler ("landlord") who would often raise capital from brewery companies in order to finance the purchase through the provision of a loan backed by a mortgage on the property. As a condition of the loan, Courage would stipulate interest rates, repayment rates and have an exclusive supply arrangement to provide its range of beers to the public house, securing the loan with a first mortgage on the property. The landlord would be free to then arrange loans and contracts with suppliers of Pale Ale (which Courage could not produce in London) and liquors who would provide further loans and take second and third charges on the property. The balance of the cost of the public house would be provided by the landlord's own capital. In 1890, the value of loans on Courage's balance sheet was £1,654,355 compared to the value of self-owned public houses of £221,602.

The late 1890s represented a boom time for the breweries. The availability of cheap money led to increased competition for the purchase of houses pushing up purchase prices. By 1897, the value of the company's loan book had grown to £2,202,879 and self-owned public houses to £786,071.

From the peak in 1897, the business underwent a transformation with a significant decline in loans and commensurate growth in Courage's direct ownership of the estate. In addition, a downturn in public house prices after a boom in the 1890s led to many landlords defaulting on their loans which reverted to the first mortgage holder or became available for purchase at lower prices. The purchase of public houses was made possible by the availability of cheap equity and debt finance to Courage based on security provided by the ownership of its own estate of public houses. By 1931, the company's business model had been completely reversed with the value of the loan book being £333,897 and self-owned public houses to £2,695,672.

A fire at the Anchor Brewhouse on 5 May 1891 destroyed the building which required the rebuilding and all brewing ceased for a month with beer being purchased from Barclay, Perkins & Co. to supply its public houses. The Anchor Brewhouse concentrated on production of mild ale and stout suited to the quality of water available from its wells. However, the water did not have the mineral ingredients needed for pale ale. Therefore, pale ale production was subcontracted to Flower & Sons Ltd (1872–1886) and then Fremlins Ltd (1886–1903).

From the start of the 20th century, Courage went through a period of expansion through acquisition which saw Courage buy seven breweries and their associated licensed public houses. As with other brewers, these purchases focused on the expanding the number of tied public houses whilst nearly all of the acquired breweries were closed down within a couple of years of becoming part of the Courage group.

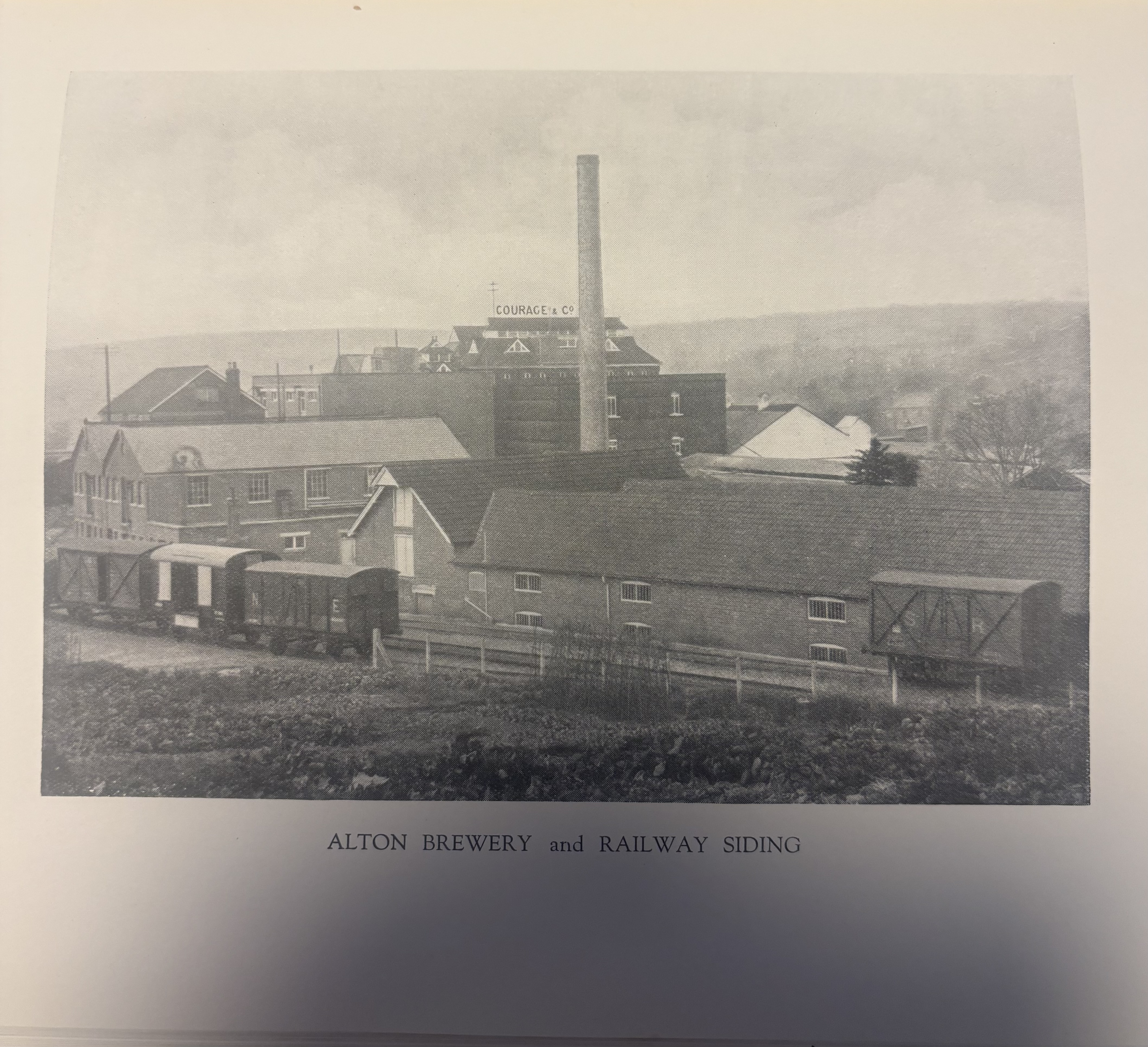
Courage's Alton Brewery and rail siding c.1930

The acquisitions started with the purchase of the Alton Brewery Co. (formerly called Halls Brewery until 1899), located in Turks Street, Alton, Hampshire, and its 77 tied houses in February 1903. The facility initially replaced the pale ale produced by Fremlins Ltd but expanded as further acquisitions were made and the estate of tied public houses grew.

Courage then made further acquisitions in London, Surrey, Kent and Berkshire expanding its geographical presence into surrounding areas that could easily be supplied by its two breweries in London and Alton.

The purchases included the Camden Brewery, consisting of freehold premises and 78 public houses in the North-West of London where the company had little presence and Courage Beers were virtually unknown. The Brewery was subsequently closed in 1926.

Farnham United Breweries was acquired in 1927. The brewery was situated close to Alton and had its own maltings and a holding of 196 licensed houses with an annual output of 45,000 barrels. As it could easily be supplied and managed from Alton the Farnham brewery itself was closed down. The Alton Brewery was extended to increase capacity to supply the acquired licensed houses. Courage raised further equity of £0.4 million to pay for the purchase

In March 1930, Courage acquired Noakes & Company in Bermondsey. The property consisted of the Brewery and 120 public houses around Bermondsey. and the Nevile Reid Brewery in Windsor, Berkshire with 140 public houses. Further in 1920, Noakes & Co. had purchased the Royal Brewery, Windsor of J. Canning & Son and 20 public houses. Courage raised further debt of £0.4 million to pay for the purchase.

In 1931, Courage's estate consisted of 886 public houses of which 462 were in London with 273 in Hampshire /Surrey and 140 in Windsor and Slough.

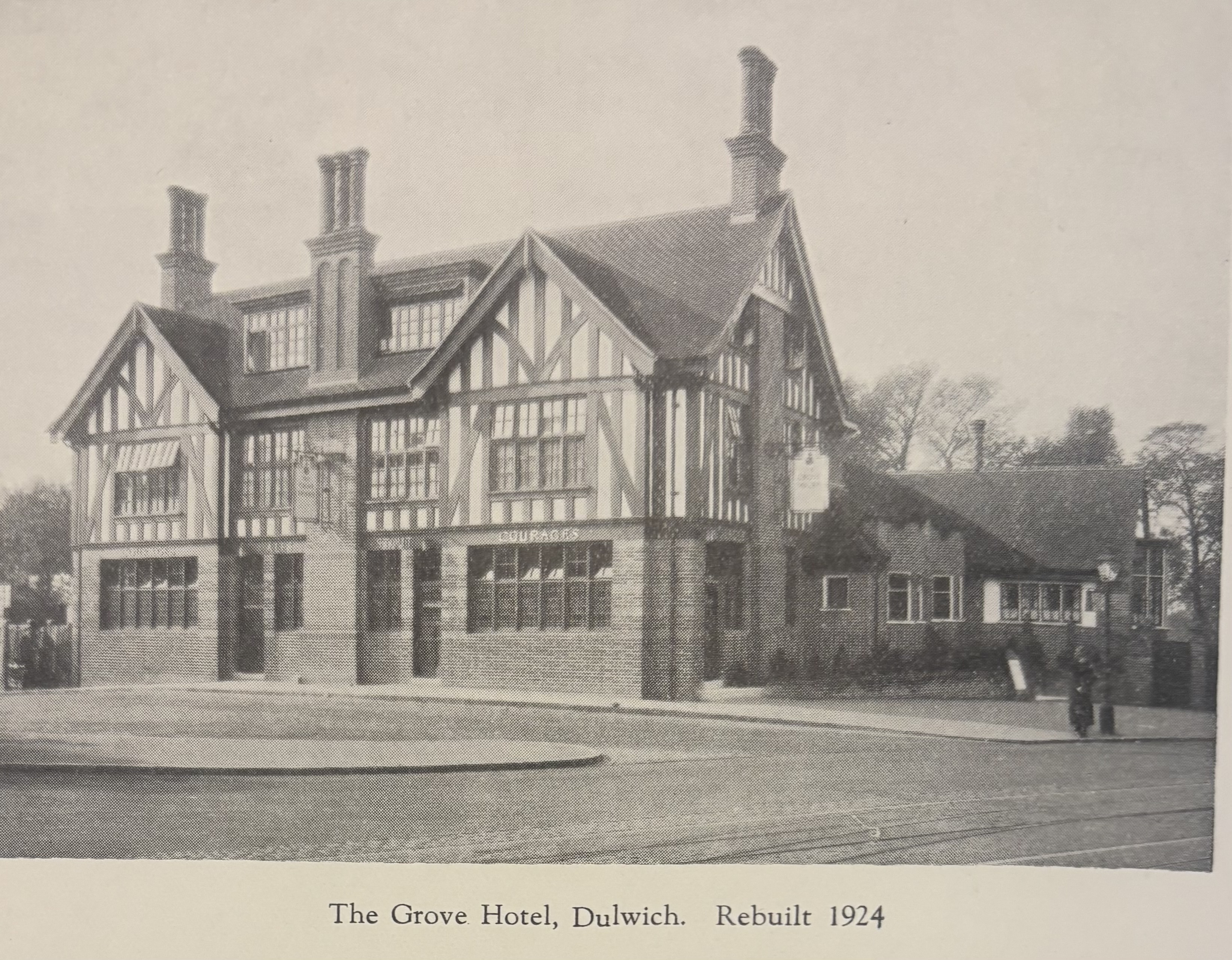
The Grove Hotel, Dulwich, London c.1930

In 1921, the Licensing Act was passed. This prohibited the sale of beer and liquors for more than 9 hours a day in London and 8 1/2 hours elsewhere. This precipitated a drinking "rush hour" and existing public houses were considered too small to cope with the concentration of demand into a limited number of hours. Courage's utilized its in-house building department consisting of surveyors, draughts men and tradesmen to enlarge and reconfigure its existing public house estate. The Tudor style of house was taken as the template for rebuilding and the first significant structure to be redeveloped was the "Grove Tavern", Lordship Lane, Dulwich, famous for once being Lord Byron's residence. The Grove Tavern is now derelict having been destroyed in a fire in 2012. The pub is currently leased by Stonegate but owned by the Dulwich Estate. It is anticipated that the site will be demolished when the lease ends in September 2025.

Whilst building the Grove Tavern, Courage's also procured a sports ground on adjoining land, which included cricket and football grounds, hard and grass courts for tennis, and a bowling green. The company also provided transport from the brewery in Bermondsey to the ground. Given its location, this ground is likely to be that currently occupied by Streatham and Marlborough Cricket Club. Courage's provided similar sports facilities in Alton which were redeveloped into residential properties in 2015 and also in Reading from the early 1960s in Coley Park. The ground was closed in the 1980s. The old site of the ground includes a public park called "Courage Park" named to commemorate its former ownership.

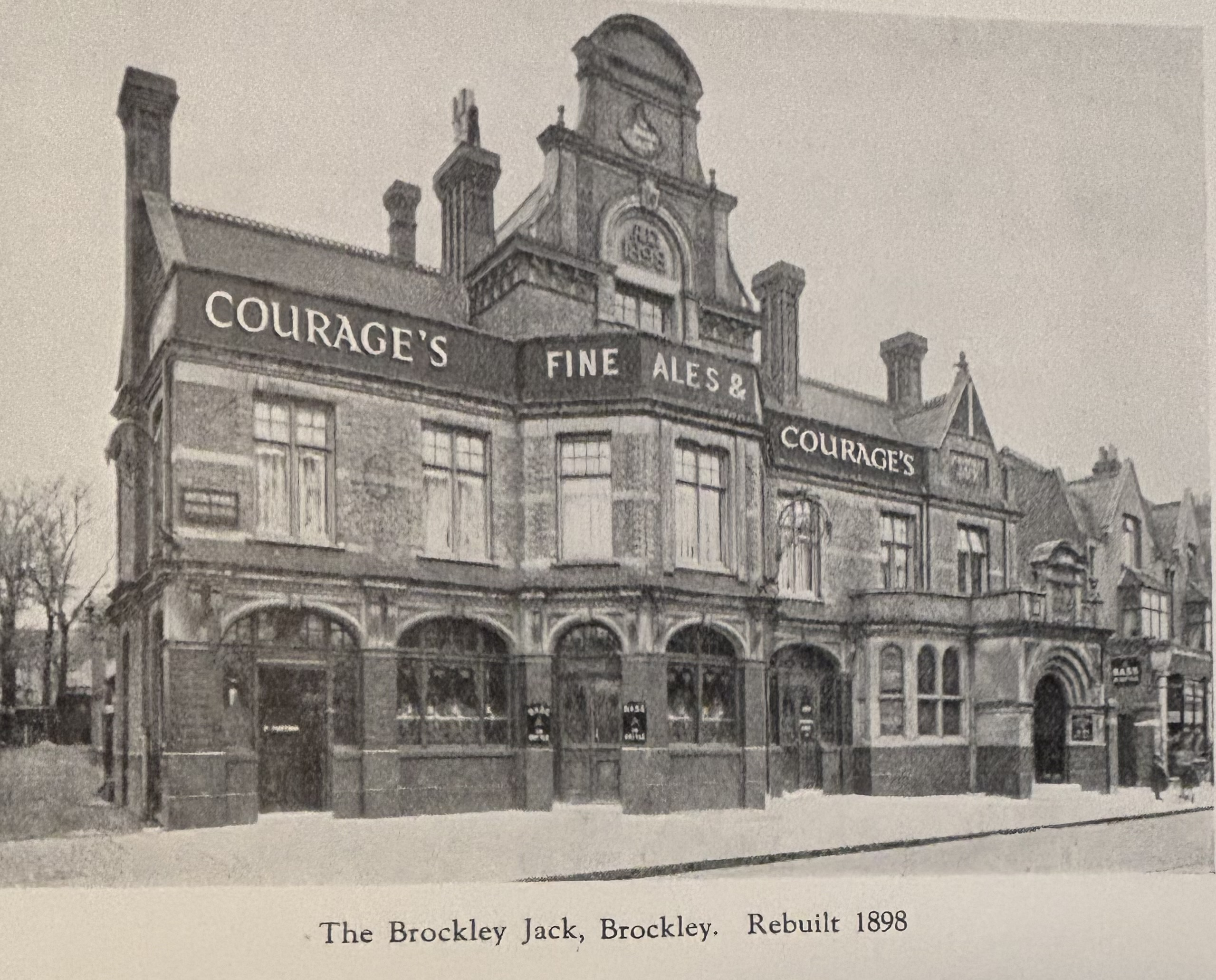
The Brockley Jack, Brockley, London

Other redevelopments included the Railway Tavern, Station Approach, Catford (now the "Catford Bridge Tavern" owned by Portobello Brewery); the Beehive, Beehive Lane, Ilford (now a Harvester) and the Brockley Jack, Brockley Road, Brockley, London a former haunt of Dick Turpin (now run by Greene King). Redevelopment of public houses extended to the company's public houses in Hampshire/Surrey and Berkshire areas including The Swan Hotel in Alton, Hampshire, (now run by Greene King) the Bush Hotel in Farnham, Surrey (a luxury hotel) the Otter at Ottershaw, Surrey (Miller & Carter Steakhouse) and the George at Wraysbury, Berkshire, (now a steakhouse) all of which are still active public houses and Hotels.

During the pre-World War II era, the company provided its employees with a number of benefits and perks. As well as the company's sports clubs and activities, the company arranged a Contributory Superannuation Scheme for staff to secure future pensions dependent on the length of service and salary, and benefits to widows and family in case of the staff member's death. The company also started the Hospital Savings Association to help deal with medical costs. The care for the company's staff was farsighted. In 1926, in the General Strike, Courage reported that not a single man ceased work.

=== End of World War II until 1970 ===
The post war period saw continued growth demand for beer as a result of population growth, an end to post-war austerity and, further improvements in transportation with the advent of motor vehicles. This reinforced the economic forces leading to the consolidation of the brewing industry.

In 1955, Courage and Co. Ltd merged with Barclay, Perkins & Co Ltd. at the nearby Anchor Brewery, Southwark to become Courage & Barclay Ltd. At this stage, Courage & Barclay Ltd had approximately 1,250 tied houses within the estate, consolidating Courage's presence in London. The Anchor Brewery was closed and the site converted into a bottling and packing plant.

In 1960, Courage & Barclay Ltd acquired the Reading based H & G Simonds Ltd, and the company name was changed to Courage, Barclay, Simonds & Co. Ltd.

In 1961, Georges & Co. Limited ("Georges Bristol Brewery") was acquired, based in Bristol with 1,459 tied houses. The brewery and tied houses were referred to as Courage (Western) Ltd. for a while.

In 1967, Hole & Co. Ltd, Castle Brewery, Newark-on-Trent, Nottinghamshire was taken over consisting of 220 tied houses.

The acquisitions extended Courage's business into South Wales, South West England, the East Midlands and South Yorkshire whilst increasing brewing capacity to meet anticipated greater demand. In addition, Courage's made further acquisitions in its existing territory around London and the surrounding area with purchases in Berkshire, Oxfordshire, Middlesex and Essex.

Consumer tastes began to change during this period. In the 1950s, UK brewers had realized the potential of a developing market for lagers. Guinness, an Irish brewing company, began to develop its own product, Harp Lager. Late in 1960, Guinness decided it needed a joint venture with other breweries in order to give it regional coverage for Harp Lager and enlisted the help of Courage & Barclay Ltd (for the South of England), Scottish and Newcastle breweries (for the North) and Mitchells and Butlers (for the Midlands) between them providing national coverage. As a consequence of entering into this joint venture a new brewing facility was planned for Alton at Manor Park next to the existing facility in Turk Street.

By the late 1960s, the group had assets of approximately £100m, and operated six breweries in London, Reading, Alton (two including the Harp Lager joint venture), Bristol and Newark-on-Trent. It owned 5,000 licensed premises in Southern England, South Wales, the East Midlands and South Yorkshire, employed 15,000 people and produced around 75 million imperial gallons (340,000,000 L) of beer annually.

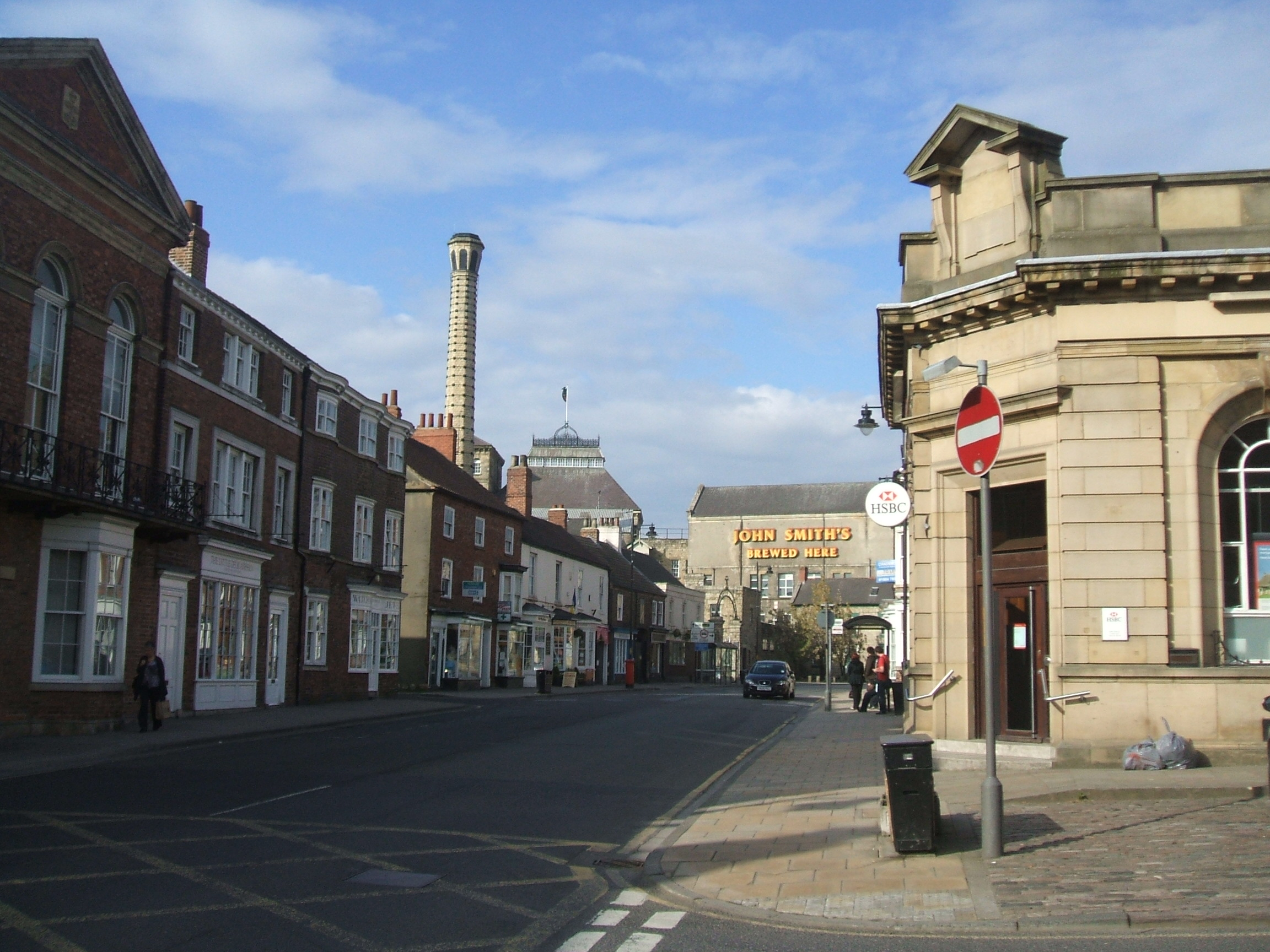
John Smith's Brewery Tadcaster

In 1970, the name of the company was simplified from Courage, Barclay, Simonds & Co. Ltd to Courage Ltd' Courage Ltd reached its pinnacle with the acquisition of John Smith's Tadcaster Brewery Co. Ltd ("John Smiths"), located in Tadcaster, South Yorkshire, with about 1,800 tied houses and breweries in Tadcaster and Barnsley. By this time John Smith's owned around 1,800 licensed premises throughout the north of England, and as far south as Lincolnshire, Nottinghamshire and parts of Cambridgeshire and Shropshire. The merged company held assets worth £137 million. By combining Courage's strength in the South of England, and John Smith's in the North, a national brewing company was created. Following the acquisition of John Smiths, Courage had become the fifth largest brewer in the United Kingdom with an estate over 6,000 tied houses.

In December 1970 Courage Ltd. further acquired Plymouth Breweries Ltd, located in Plymouth, Devon for £6.5 million.

=== Consolidation and the sale of the business ===
The 1970s were a difficult decade for the brewing industry. A downturn in consumption as consumer tastes changed, an economic downturn and a number of strikes among workers had begun to affect revenues. Having anticipated continuing growth, Courage had committed to develop the new "mega-keggery" at Worton Grange in Reading to increase capacity and consolidate production. Construction had quickly got out of control and estimated costs had increased from £28 million to £63 million. In light of these pressures, Richard Courage, the Chairman of Courage Ltd, sold the company to Imperial Tobacco (subsequently called "Imperial Group") for £320 million in 1972. Following the purchase, the name of the company was changed to Imperial Brewing and Leisure Limited.

Courage operated nine breweries in 1970 (London, Alton (two including the Harp Lager facility), Reading, Newark-upon-Trent, Bristol, Tadcaster, Barnsley and Plymouth. The Worton Grange brewery opened in 1978. This led to the centralization of brewing activity at the facility, setting off a substantial round of closures and sale of the existing older facilities.

Brewing continued to be the major industry in Alton throughout the 1970s, despite the development of a light industrial estate on the south side of the railway line. The town was hard hit by the news that Courage intended to discontinue operations in the town and move to Reading. On the 25 September 1979, the Courage site, the Manor Park ("Harp Lager") facility, sports facility on Anstey Road, pump/well and old maltings were purchased by Bass Brewing Company ("Bass"). The Turk Street brewery was closed by Bass and turned into a bottling and packing facility. It was subsequently closed and the site sold for development. It is now occupied by a Sainsbury Supermarket. Brewing continued in the town until May 2015, when the old Harp Lager facility was closed by its then owners, Molson Coors with the loss of 105 jobs. In 2025, the Manor Park is being redeveloped for housing.

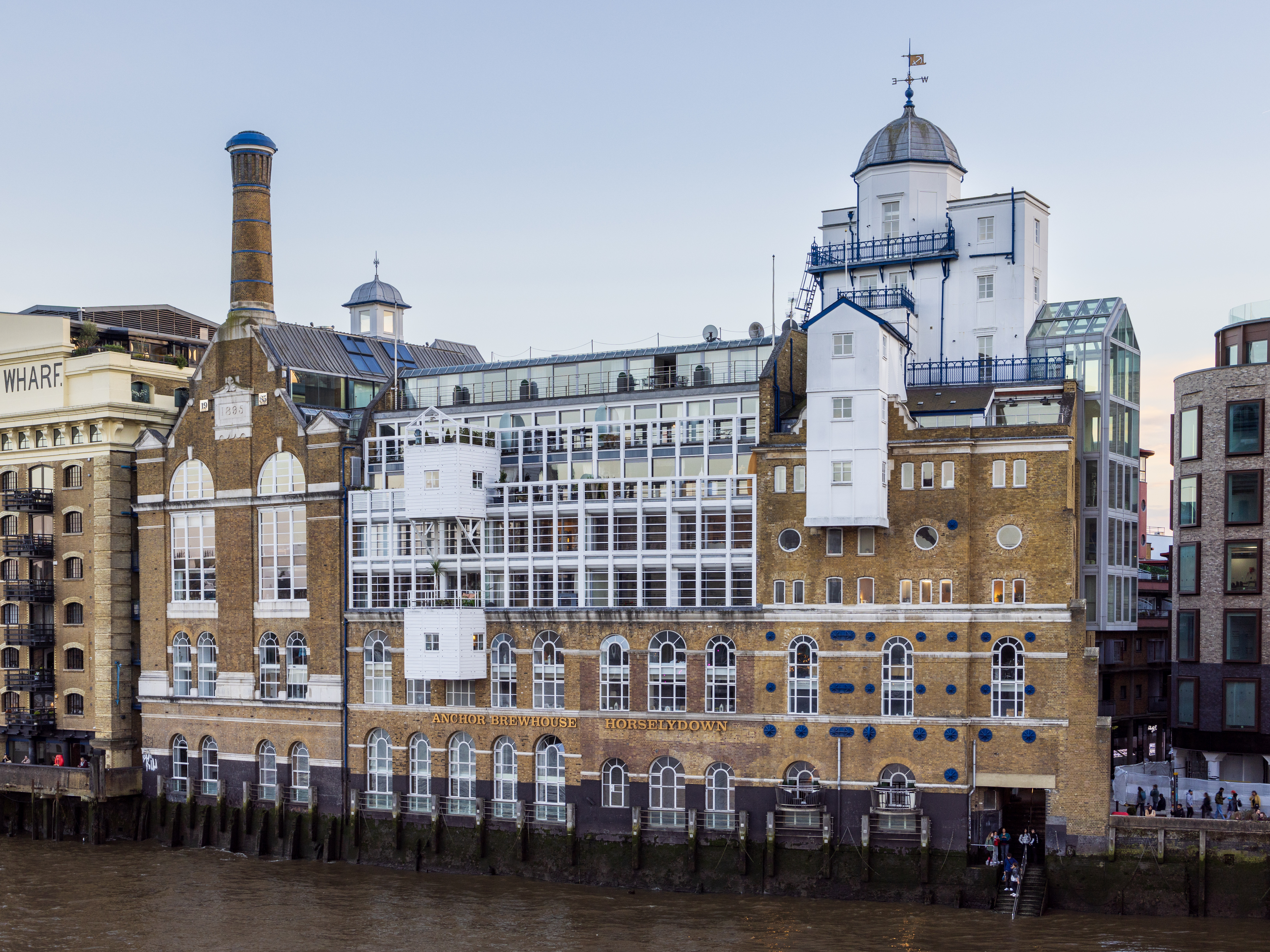
Anchor Brewhouse

The Anchor Brewhouse in London closed in 1981 as did the bottling and packing facility at The Anchor Brewery, Southwark. The Anchor Brewhouse was converted into apartments.

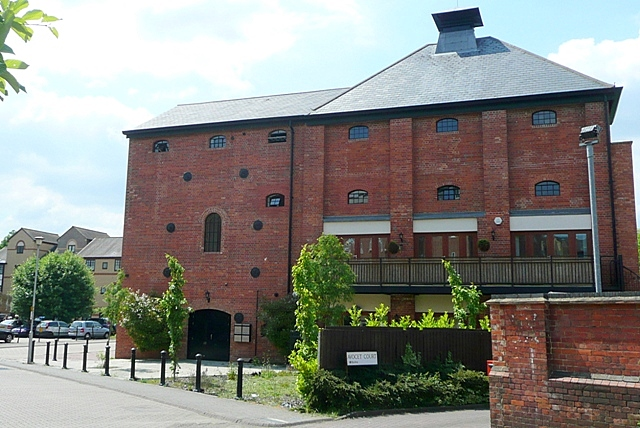
Simmonds Brewery Malthouse Reading

The Bridge Street Brewery, in Reading, Berkshire was acquired with the 1960 purchase of H & G Simonds Ltd. The Reading Brewery became known as Courage (Central) Ltd. It ceased operations in 1979 with all operations transferred to nearby Worton Grange on the outskirts of the town. The Bridge Street brewery was demolished in 1983, with the site redeveloped to become the Oracle shopping centre.

The Plymouth Brewery became known as "Courage South West" for a while. The brewery was closed in March 1984.

The John Smiths Tadcaster Brewery was substantially redeveloped and expanded throughout 1974. However, the John Smiths Barnsley brewery was closed on 27 March 1976.

By 1986, brewing activity had been consolidated to three sites at Worton Grange in Reading, Tadcaster and Bristol.

=== 1986 onwards ===
In 1986, Hanson Trust acquired the Imperial Group, including Imperial Brewing and Leisure Limited for £2.5 billion. Much of the purchase price came from the sale of what Hanson Trust considered non-core assets and Courage was sold for £1.4 billion to Elders IXL, an Australian brewing and agribusiness and became part of the Elders Brewing Group.

The Elders Brewing Group were renamed the Fosters Brewing Group in 1990.

In March 1991, Courage acquired the Webster's Brewery, the Ruddles Brewery and Watney's Mortlake Stag Brewery from Grand Metropolitan in a deal that pooled 8,450 pubs into the jointly owned Inntrepreneur Estates Company giving each company 50% ownership. Inntrepreneur had to have 4,350 tied pubs by the time the Beer Orders took effect, which led to many being sold and fewer being let on free-of-tie leases.

The Webster's Brewery was closed in 1996.

The Ruddles Brewery was sold to Grolsch in 1992, In 1997, Grolsch, in turn, sold Ruddles Brewery to Morland & Co. Ltd. Morland & Co. Ltd closed the brewery in 1998.

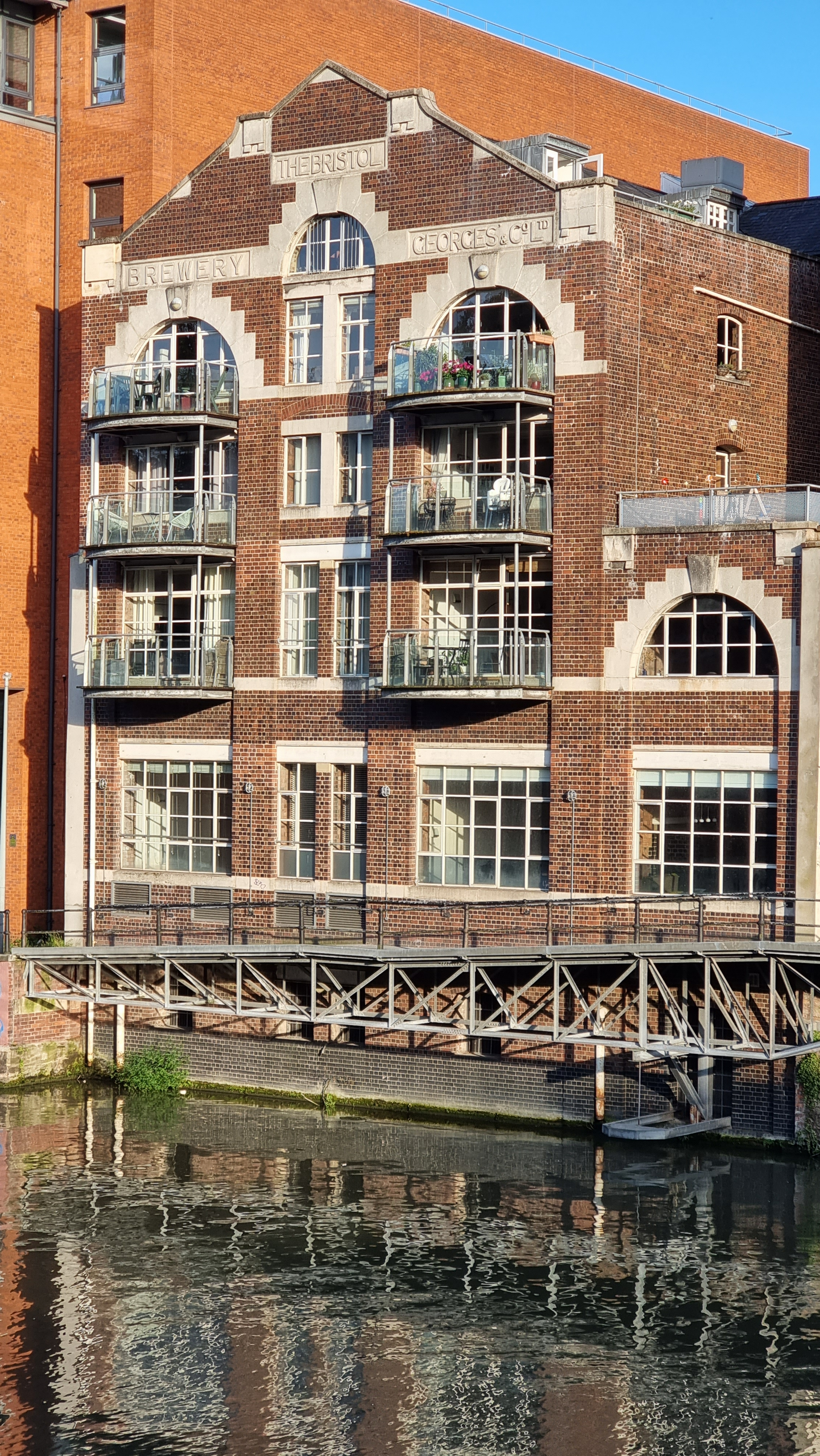
Facade of the Bristol Brewery - George's & Co.Ltd

Watney's Mortlake Stag Brewery site was sold on to ABinBev in 2002. The site was closed for redevelopment in 2015.

The Bristol brewery ceased operation in 1999. Some buildings remain but most of the brewery site has been redeveloped for housing and commercial uses.

In 2007, brewing, marketing and sales rights of the Courage brands, Courage Directors, Mild, Light Ale and Best were sold to Wells & Young of Bedford, which subsequently reverted to Charles Wells, when Wells bought Young's shares of the joint venture. The owners subsequently rekindled production of the famous 10% abv bottled Courage Imperial Russian Stout which was first brewed in the 18th century by Thrale's brewery;. These rights were managed by Courage Brands Ltd. Scottish & Newcastle (and subsequently Heineken) had a 17 per cent stake in Courage Brands Ltd until 2011, when Charles Wells took full ownership. In 2017, Marston's Brewery acquired the rights to the Courage brands as part of its acquisition of Charles Wells's Eagle Brewery. In 2020, Marston's merged its brewing business with Carlsberg UK (the United Kingdom arm of Carlsberg Group), in a joint venture valued at £780m. Marston's took a 40% stake and received up to £273m in cash. The deal involved Marston's six breweries and distribution depots, but not its 1,400 pubs. The merger was approved by the Competition and Markets Authority on 9 October 2020. In 2024, Marston's sold their 40% share in Carlsberg Marston's Brewing Company ("CMBC") to Carlsberg for £206m in order to focus on running the pub business. The deal to acquire Marston's 40% stake in CMBC was completed on 21 July 2024.

Traditional Courage products have seen a decline in sales in the 21st Century. Courage Best sales have decreased from 421,000 hectolitres (9.3 million gallons) in 2003 to under 142,000 hectolitres (3.1 million gallons) in 2012. The Courage Directors has declined to 60,000 hectolitres (1.3 million gallons), from 140,000 hectolitres (3.1 million gallons) in 2003.

In 2008, brewers Carlsberg and Heineken purchased Scottish & Newcastle for £7.8 billion ($15.3 billion). The assets were split between the two purchasing companies, with the UK assets, including the old remaining Courage breweries, being acquired by Heineken.

The Worton Grange (Reading) site was closed in 2010 and became a Tesco Distribution Centre.

The Tadcaster brewery remains in operation as part of the Heineken group. It is the only remaining Courage associated brewery still in production.

== Beers ==
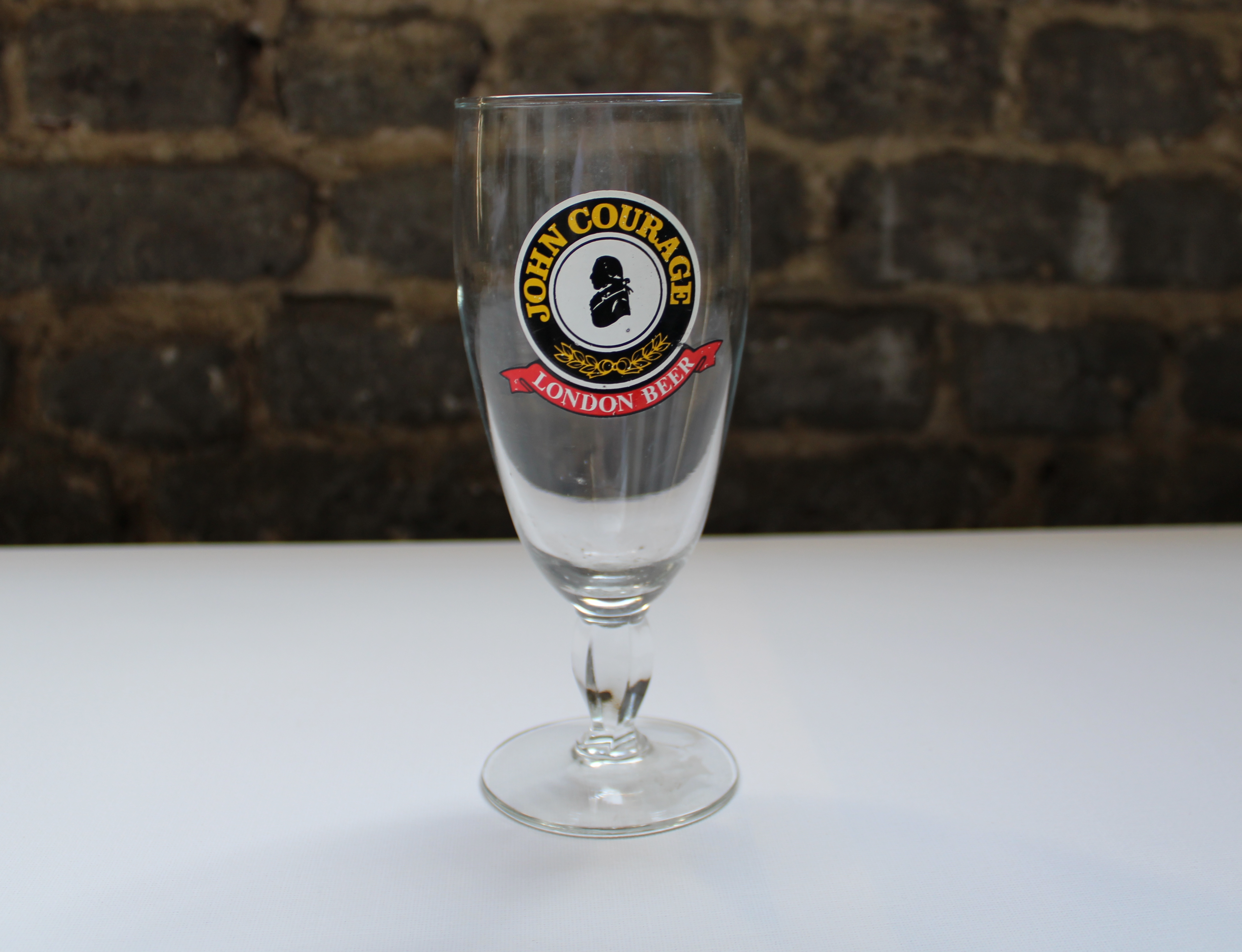
Beer glass John Courage London Beer

Beers bearing the Courage name include:

- Courage Best Bitter (4 per cent ABV in cask and keg, 3.8 per cent in bottles and cans). It is described as "pale in colour, fully balanced with a malty flavour and distinctive hop character, [and] makes for an easy drinking session beer". Courage Best Bitter sponsors local events within its south west of England heartland. It remains one of the UK's top ten ales.
- Courage Directors (4.8 per cent ABV in cask, keg, bottles and cans). Available in cask, bottles and cans. Courage Directors was originally brewed at the Alton brewery under the name of Alton Red and was served exclusively in the Courage's Directors dining rooms. Following the suggestion of Courage's director Peter Rowe, Alton Red was renamed Directors Bitter and marketed to the general public. It is described as "full bodied with a clean, bitter taste, balanced with a sweet burnt [flavour], malty and fruity notes with a distinctive dry-hop aroma and flavour". It has a strong following in London and the South East, and across the UK as a whole remains in the top ten premium cask ales, and the top twenty bottled ales. It is brewed with English Target hops, burnt Pale and Crystal malts.
- Courage Dark Mild (3 per cent) A mild ale available in keg form only.
- Courage Light Ale (3.2 per cent) 10 fl oz bottles often used to make "light and bitter" with Courage Best Bitter.
- Courage Imperial Russian Stout (10 per cent) (retired 2003, reinstated 2011)
- Courage Velvet Stout (5 per cent)
- Courage 1945 Ale (5 per cent) (retired)
- Courage Ceremonial Ale (4.8 per cent) (retired)
- Courage Directors Winter Warmer (5.5 per cent) (retired)

Beers bearing the John Courage name include:

- John Courage (4.7 per cent) (retired) Bitter.
- John Courage Amber (unknown percentage) (retired) Bitter/Amber Ale.
- John Courage Export Lager (unknown percentage) (retired)
- John Courage Strong Pale Ale (4.2 per cent) (retired)

== Branding and advertising ==
=== Golden Cockerel ===
The Golden Cockerel image is thought to come from the Courage family's coat of arms, a reference back to the probable French Huguenot heritage. The symbol was used haphazardly within the company for many years on stationery but not standardized. Between 1949 and 1955, Courage appointed Milner Gray of Design Research Unit ("DRU) to develop a corporate identity. Using the golden cockerel as the logo, the image was used on the inside and outside of public houses and breweries and on lorries.

=== Slogans ===
At the same time as the branding exercise, the company introduced a new slogan. "Take Courage" was commonly printed on company material, beer mats and ashtrays from the 1950s to the 1980s. An early mention of the slogan appeared in a publication called the American Magazine in 1952 about a trip to Europe. The American Magazine article stated: "Left pub early because we fly to Paris at 9am. Saw a sign saying 'Take Courage Here.' Learned Courage is a brand of beer."

The slogan was also painted on brewery buildings such as the Anchor Brewery in Southwark and Courage public houses. Many of these remain today as "Ghost Signs".

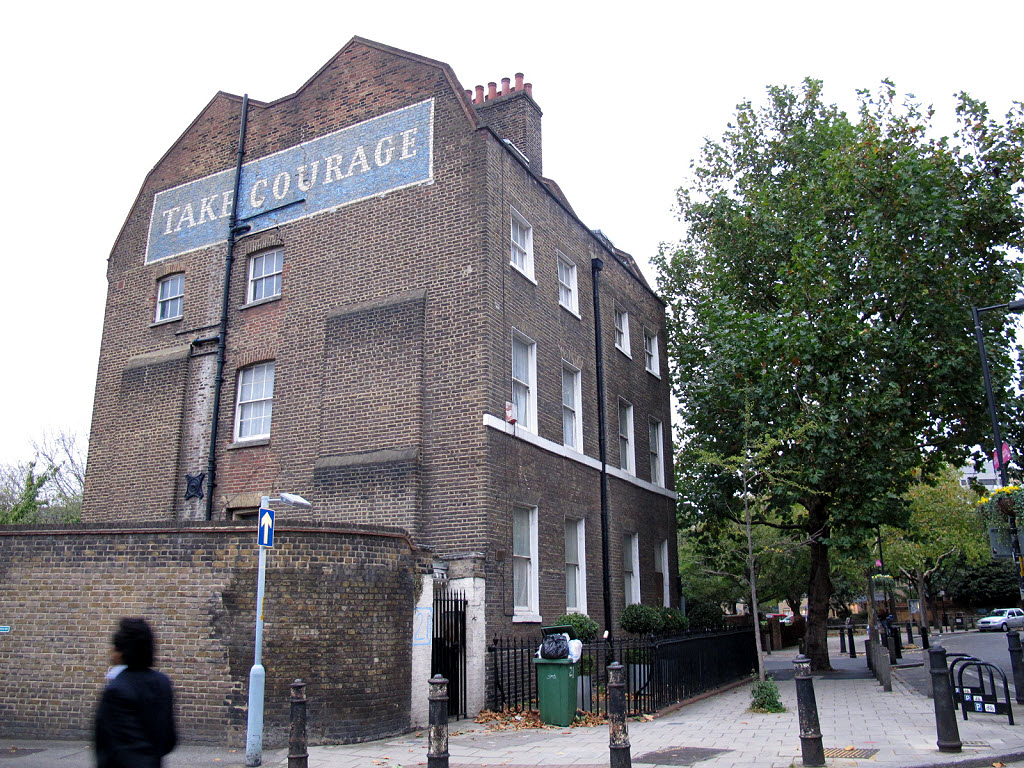
Take Courage - Ghost Sign

In 2009 Courage's revived the "Take Courage" slogan for a series of posters with the slogan "Take Courage My Friend" as part of a £2 million advertising campaign. The adverts featured men faced with different awkward life situations.

One of the adverts in the series, received a total of three complaints to The Advertising Standards Authority (ASA), that the content of the advert implied that drinking a glass of beer would increase the man's confidence in one of the situations depicted. The ASA ruling stated "Although we understood the humorous intention of the scenario, we concluded that the poster breached the code by suggesting that the beer could increase confidence".

The ruling was controversial because of the small number of complaints received to trigger the investigation, leading to the ASA being accused of puritanism. It was also noted that the brewers of Courage at the time, Young's, had been involved in controversy for similar adverts for one of their other beer brands in 2006. The ASA ruling received national news coverage in the United Kingdom which coincidentally increased visibility of the poster which was prominently shown in many of the national newspapers and the BBC website, effectively giving the brewers free advertising and international recognition in Russia, Italy and China among other places. This led to even more controversy.

In the 1970s, Courage's adopted the slogan "It's what your right arms for". The slogan was printed on beer mats including commemorative series such as the Great Engineers Series. Other slogans of the time included "Don't waste valuable Tavern time" and "Courage - In the best tradition".

=== TV advertisements ===
In the early 1970s, Courage ran a series of TV advertisements that featured bucolic English scenes on sunny summer days with groups of friends taking part in activities such as playing Bowls on Plymouth Hoe or completing a round of golf. The commentary took the form of a poem relaying the sporting activities and successes which were them celebrated in the local pub or club bar ending with the strap-line "A long cool pint of JC".

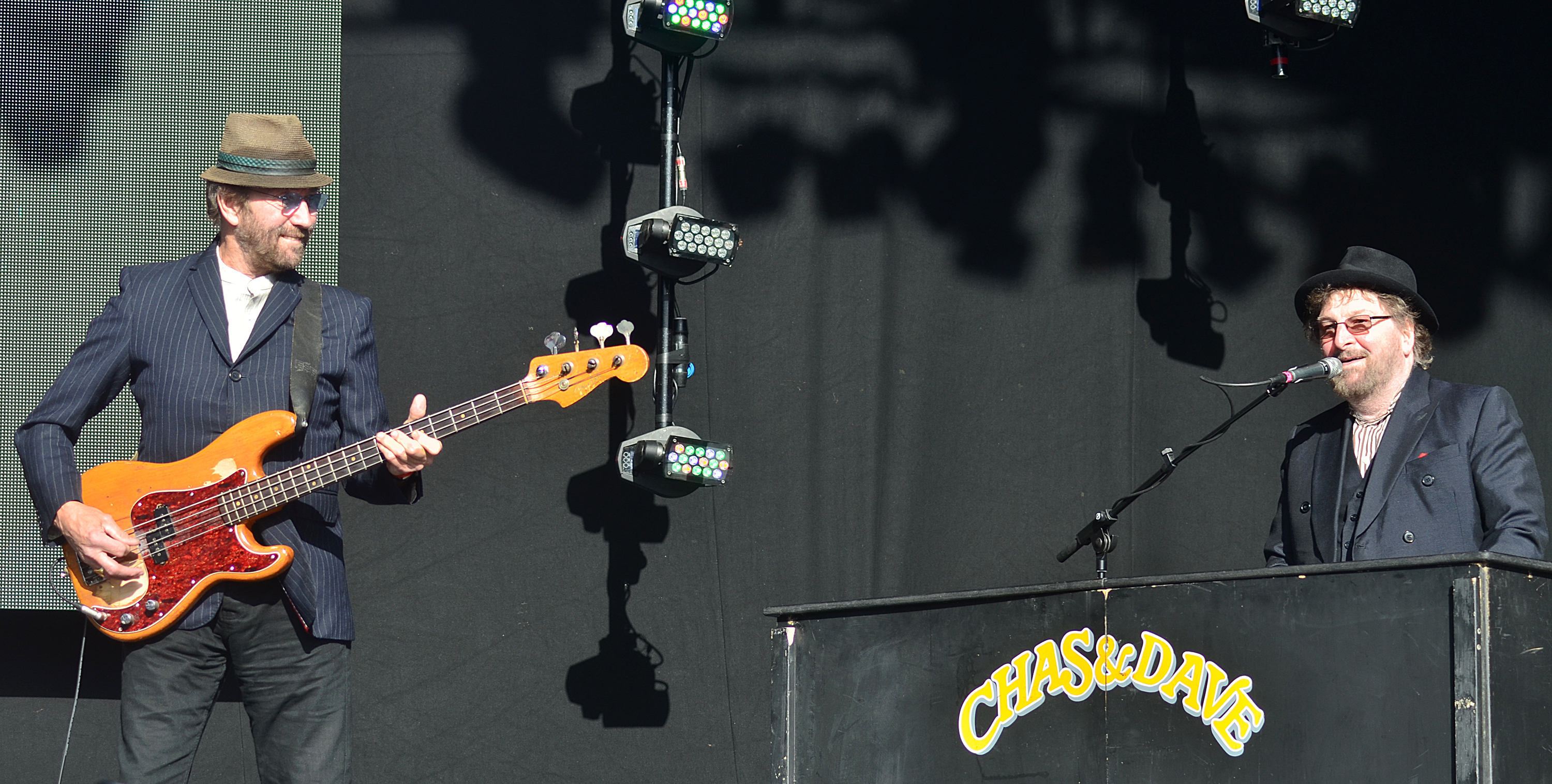
Chas & Dave

By the end of the 1970s, Courage were looking for a concept for a new set of adverts for Courage Best Bitter and appointed John Webster of BMP to come up with an idea. Out one evening for an after work drink with a colleague Webster came across the Rockney duo Chas & Dave playing "Woortcha", a song they had written in 1973, in a pub called The Oxford Arms, near Shoreditch and the kernel of an idea for the campaign emerged.

The first advert from the series, "Gertcha" (a remaking of the song "Woortcha") was first aired in 1979. Filmed in black and white, the advert featured an authentic period reconstruction of an East End of London pub from the 1950s. Coupled with the re-working of Chas & Dave's song, the advert became iconic. The advert rekindled thoughts of Courage's London roots and instantly the word "Gertcha" became commonly used. The advert was nominated for the ITV Award for Advertisements and the British Arrows Awards (British Television Advertising Awards) in 1980. The advert proved so popular that it was rerun in 1982. The advert was placed 85th in the Channel 4 TV programme The 100 Greatest TV Ads which first aired on 29 April 2000.

The advert propelled Chas & Dave into the limelight with "Gertcha" being released as a single and peaking in the UK music charts at number 20. Dave Hodges of Chas & Dave has stated that he couldn't walk down the street without someone shouting "Gertcha" at him.

Other Chas & Dave songs were adapted and used in a series of further adverts based around the same theme, the 1950s East End pub. "The Sideboard Song", "Rabbit", "What a miserable Saturday Night", "That's what I like", "Margate" and "Wallop" were all used. The advert "Snookered" featuring the Chas & Dave song "Wallop" was nominated for the British Arrows Awards (British Television Advertising Awards) in 1984.

Most of the TV adverts in the series featured the slogan "Remember a pint of best - Courage do".

=== Sponsorship ===
==== Sports ====
The brewery sponsored Reading FC from 1984 until 1990 reflecting Courage's long term association with the town.

Courage sponsored the English Premiership rugby union league for ten years from 1987 until 1997. Courage were the first sponsors of the league and this was the first club league trophy awarded to a top tier English club. The company logo, the Cockerel, featured in the design of the trophy. The initial sponsorship was worth £1.6 million for the initial three years. The deal were subsequently renewed for £2.4 million in 1990. The sponsorship contract was further renewed in 1993 after significant negotiation and an extension of Courage's first refusal arrangements. The sponsorship was worth £7.0 million with an additional marketing and support package worth a further £3.0 million. Allied Dunbar replaced Courage as league sponsors in 1997 when a new trophy was commissioned.

Courage Best Bitter were an associate club sponsor of rugby union club the Exeter Chiefs for the 2011/12 season.

In 2007, Courage became the official beer for two darts tournaments after signing a deal with the Professional Darts Corporation. The deal saw Courage Best and Directors Bitter stocked at both tournaments and the construction of the "Courage Stand" at the Ladbrokes.com World Championship.

==== Courage Shire Horse Centre ====
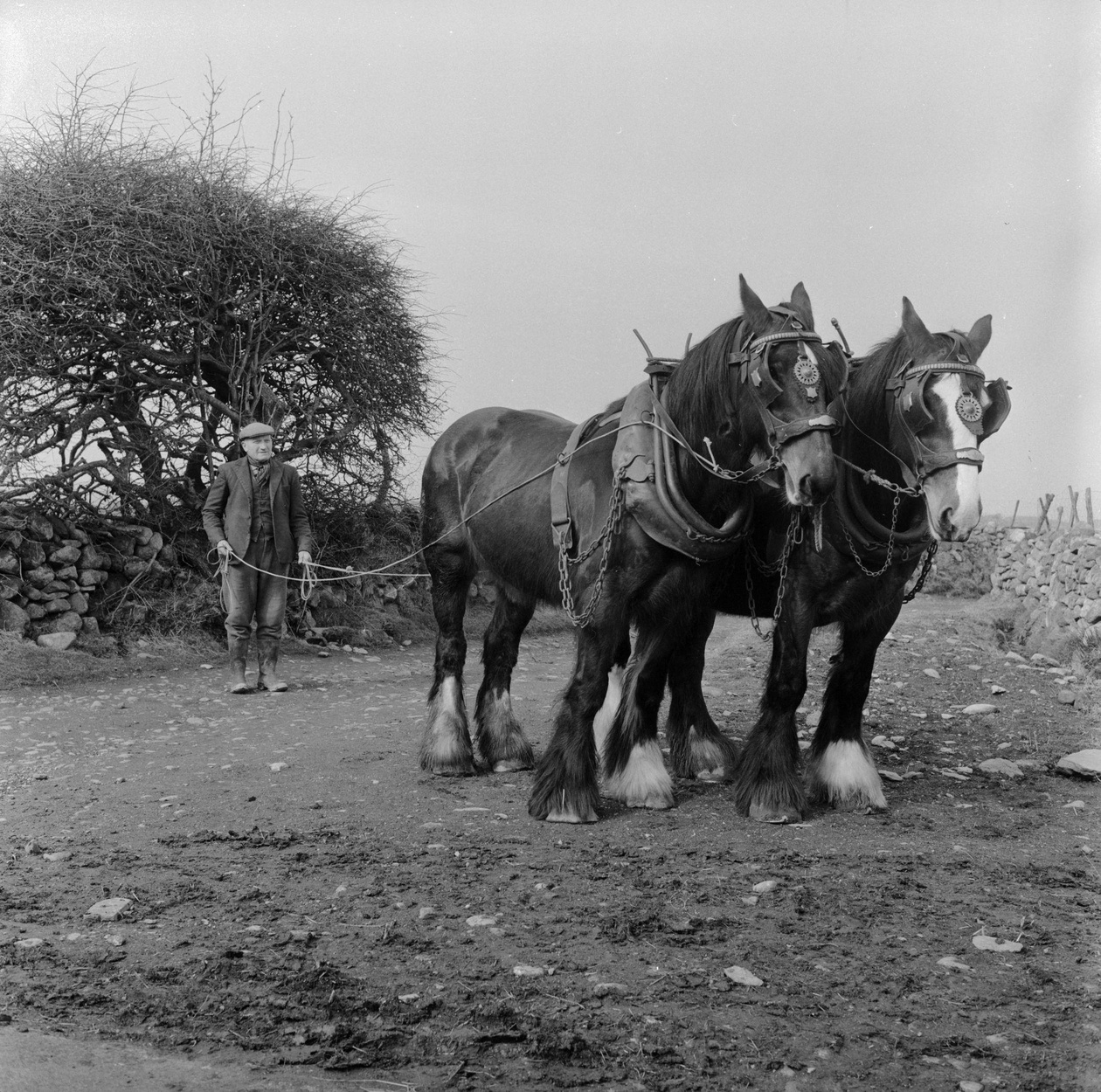
Shire horses

The shire horse is a draught horse which was historically used as a working animal pulling agricultural machinery or delivery carts. The company has always had an affiliation with the shire horses that pulled the beer deliveries through the streets of London. When the limited liability company started in 1888 there were 78 animals stabled at the Anchor Brewhouse. By 1915 the number of horse had increased to 104.

The company took great pride in arranging horses in color. The Courage family, particularly Henry Courage devoted themselves to the horses and delivery teams. Horses were the only means of transport until the company took delivery of its first lorry in January 1916. Even in 1932, the company still had a stable of 32 regular working horses to supplement a fleet of 47 trucks

The breed fell into decline and faced extinction as their use as working animals was superseded by mechanized automotive power. In the 1900s there were around a million shire horses in the UK compared to around 3,000 now.

In the mid-1970s Courage began to sponsor a shire horse sanctuary situated in Littlefield Green, near Maidenhead, Berkshire. The sanctuary provided a home for retired shire horses, together with educating the public about the breed, its history and cultural importance. There was no admission fee. The shire horses and Courage Dray were often seen at fairs and events throughout the local region.

On 5 July 1978, Royal Mail issued postage stamps featuring the Shire Horse to mark the 100th anniversary of the Shire Horse Society. A special commemorative first day cover, featuring the Courage shire horses was commissioned. The first day covers were transported from the Shire Horse Centre to Maidenhead Post Office by shire horse-drawn dray. The 2 mile journey was completed in 1 1/2 hours.

The Shire Horse Centre closed in the late 1990s. The site was bought in 2005 and became an animal education centre and craft workshop named Village Life. When that closed in 2010, the site became a temporary home for Heroes Berkshire until 2013. In 2015, the site was purchased by Hicks Development who received planning permission to build 6 large detached properties on the land. The houses are located on a cul-de-sac, called The Shires, adjoining Bath Road ("the A4"). The Shire Horse public house is located next to where the entrance to the Courage Shire Horse Centre was located.

== In popular culture ==
Courage Director's Bitter was a favourite of the British television character Alan Partridge. In the programme, first aired on 25 November 2002, Alan shares this passion during his short-lived friendship with Dan, who states that he has it "coming out of his taps" in the episode "Bravealan" (Series 2, Episode 3 of I'm Alan Partridge).

A statue of 'Jacob', a working dray horse, has been placed at the Anchor Brewhouse. The statue commemorates the Courage brewery horses that were stabled beside the establishment, near to where the monument is situated on Queen Elizabeth Street. The stables have long been demolished.
