= Paley =

Paley may refer to:

== People ==
- Albert Paley (born 1944), a modernist American metal sculptor
- A. G. V. Paley (1903–1976), British military personnel
- Andy Paley (born 1952), American songwriter
- Babe Paley (1915–1978), American magazine editor and socialite
- Dror Paley (born 1956), Canadian surgeon
- Edward Graham Paley (1823–1895), English architect
- Ethel Paley (1920–2019), American social worker
- Frederick Apthorp Paley (1815–1888), English classical scholar
- Grace Paley (1922–2007), American writer and peace activist
- Henry Paley (1859–1946), English architect, son of Edward
- Irina Paley (1903–1990), daughter of Grand Duke Paul Alexandrovich of Russia
- John Paley (1871–1907), American writer
- Maureen Paley (born 1953), American art dealer, based in London
- Natalia Pavlovna Paley (1905–1981), French-Russian model
- Nina Paley (born 1968), American cartoonist, animator and free culture activist
- Phillip Paley (born 1963), American actor
- Princess Olga Paley (1865–1929), second wife of Grand Duke Paul Alexandrovich of Russia
- Raymond Paley (1907–1933), English mathematician
- Reid Paley, American singer-songwriter
- Ron Paley (born 1950), Canadian composer
- Stephen Paley (born 1942), American photographer
- Thomas Paley (1803–1860), English barrister
- Tom Paley (1928–2017), American guitarist
- Vivian Paley (1929–2017), American educator
- Vladimir Paley (1897–1918), Russian poet, son of Olga
- William Paley (1743–1805), English apologist and philosopher
- William S. Paley (1901–1990), American broadcaster

== Other uses ==
- Emma Paley, fictional character in the comic series Peter Parker
- Paley, Seine-et-Marne, a commune of the Seine-et-Marne département, in France
- Paley Street, a village in Berkshire
