= The Anchor, Bankside =

Pub in Bankside, London

Coordinates: 51.5073°N 0.0931°W

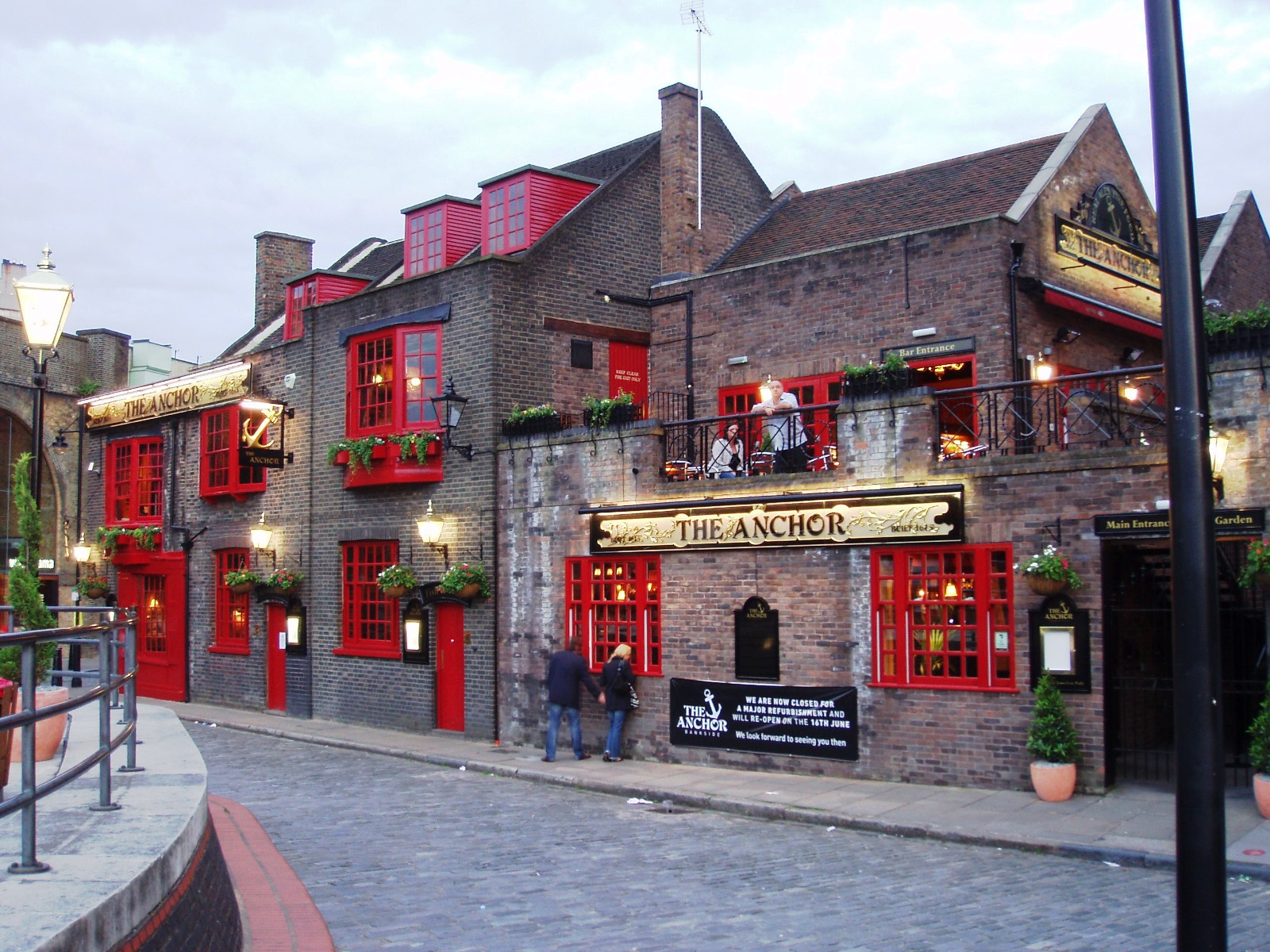
The Anchor

The Anchor is a pub in the London Borough of Southwark. It is in the Bankside locality on the south bank of the River Thames, close to Southwark Cathedral and London Bridge station. A tavern establishment (under various names) has been at the pub's location for over 800 years. Behind the pub are buildings that were operated by the Anchor Brewery.

The Anchor started life as the "brewery tap room" for the Anchor Brewery, first established in 1616. Michelin's travel guide incorrectly states that the Anchor was rebuilt in 1676 after the Great Fire of London in 1666 destroyed it. This was impossible as the fire never reached the southern side of the Thames outside of the limits of the City of London. The book The Rough Guide to London states that the establishment was first built in 1770. The establishment was also rebuilt again in the 19th century.

The establishment has been described as "Bankside's oldest surviving tavern" in the book Secret Bankside: Walks in the Outlaw Borough.

== History ==
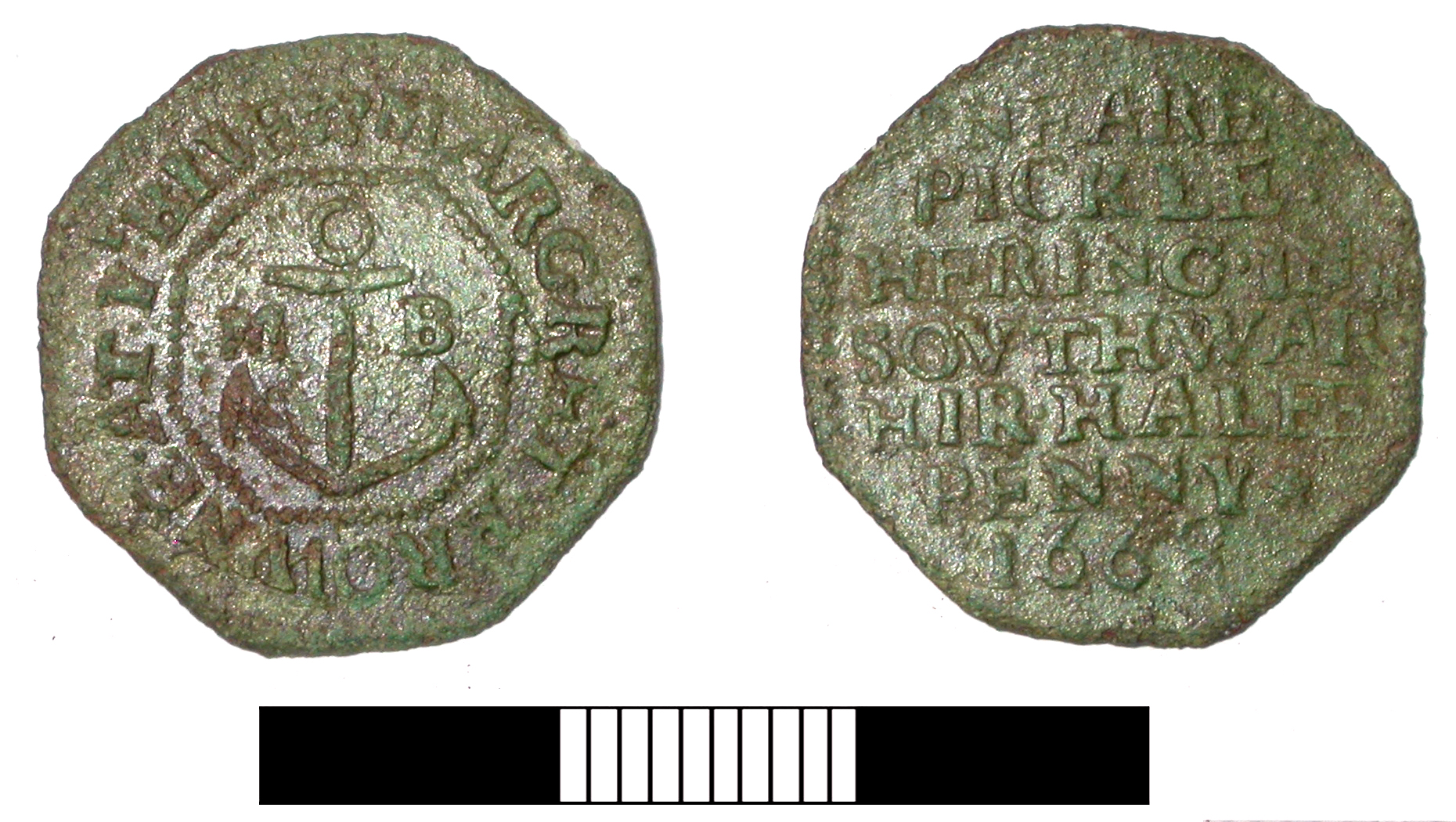
Token coin issued by Margaret Browne of the Anchor in Southwark, 1668.

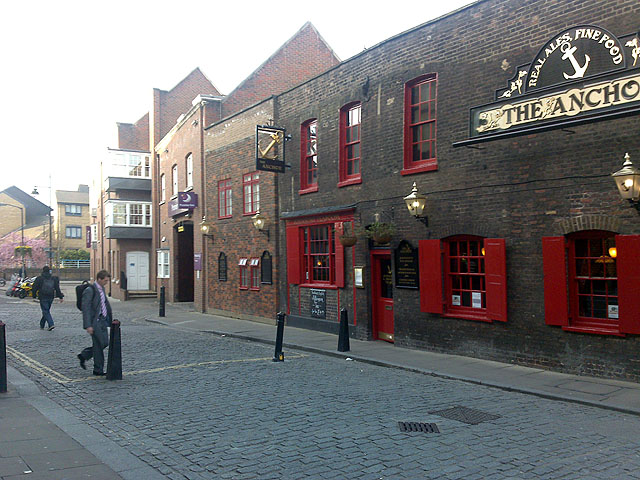
Another view of the pub

This pub is the sole survivor of the riverside inns that existed here in Shakespeare's time when this district was at the heart of theatreland and the Thames was London's principal highway. It was frequented by many actors from the neighbouring playhouses, including the Globe, the Swan and the Rose. It is where diarist Samuel Pepys observed the Great Fire of London in 1666. He wrote that he took refuge in "a little alehouse on bankside ... and there watched the fire grow". Another fire devastated the pub, whose interior was mainly constructed of oak. It was rebuilt in 1676 and has since had additions over the centuries. The Anchor tavern became a favourite place for river pirates and smugglers; during the course of repairs carried out in the early 19th century the removal of a massive oak beam revealed ingeniously contrived hiding places, which were probably used for the storage of stolen goods and contraband.

== In contemporary times ==
In June 2008, the Anchor underwent one of the most costly refurbishments in pub history – reported to have cost £2.6 million – funded by its then owners Punch Taverns. The pub is now owned by Greene King and is branded as London Locals Urban Business.

== Notable clientele ==
Notable patrons of the Anchor have included:

- David Garrick
- Oliver Goldsmith
- Samuel Johnson

== In popular culture ==
- The Anchor was featured in the closing scenes of Mission: Impossible.
