= Anchor Brewery =

Brewery in Park Street, Southwark, London, England

Coordinates: 51.5068°N 0.0933°W

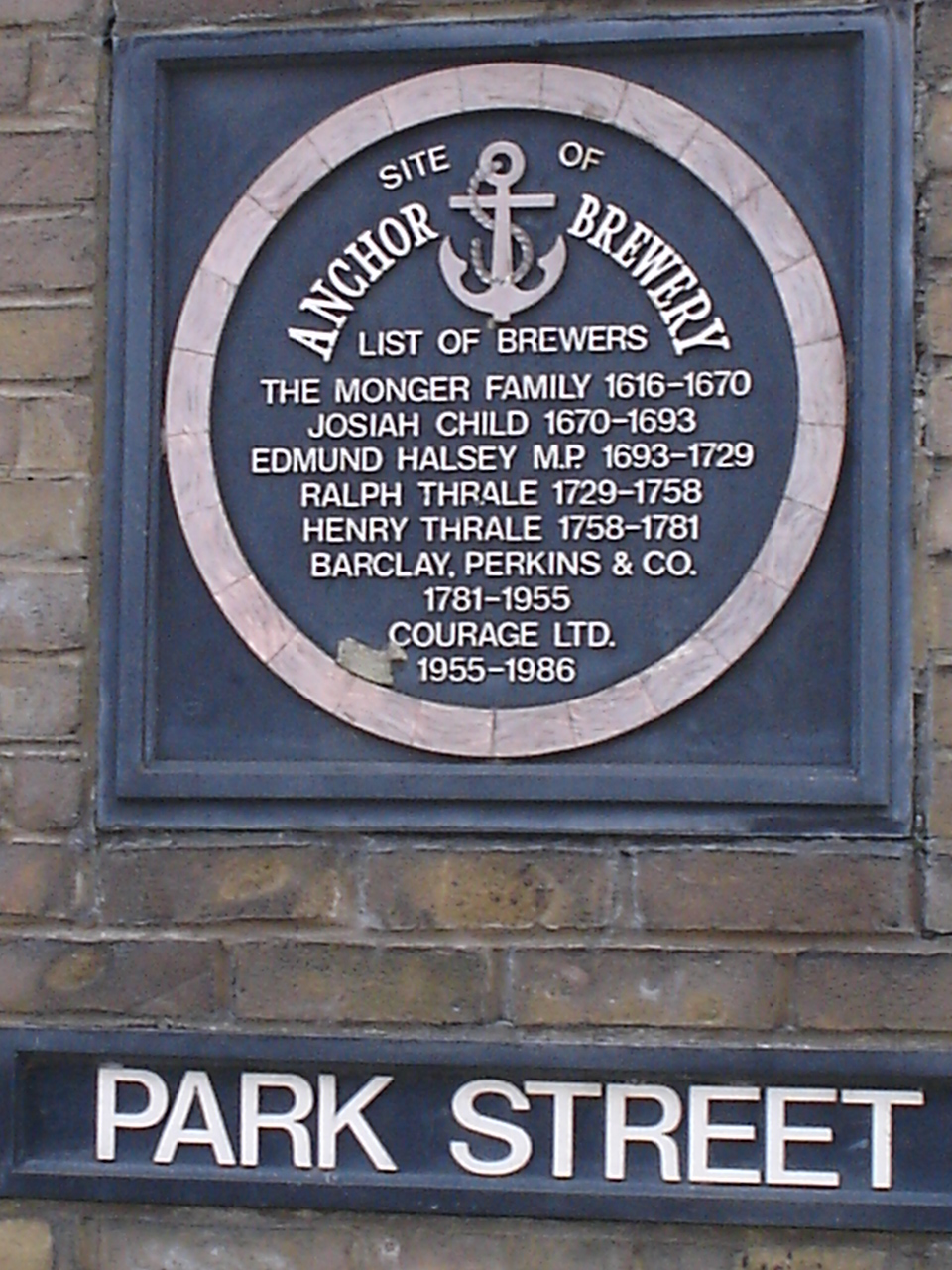
Plaque marking former site of the Anchor Brewery.

The Anchor Brewery was a brewery in Park Street, Southwark, London, England. Established in 1616, by the early nineteenth century it was the largest brewery in the world. From 1781 it was operated by Barclay Perkins & Co, who in 1955 merged with the Courage Brewery, which already owned the nearby Anchor Brewhouse. The Park Street brewery was demolished in 1981.

== History ==
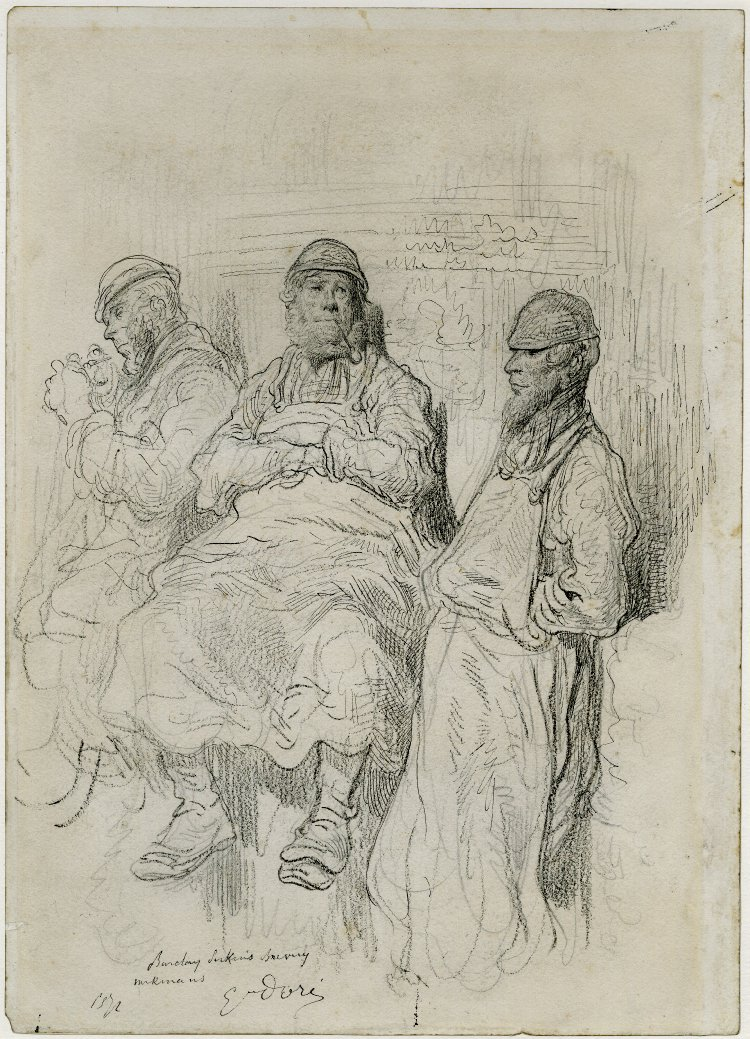
Workmen at the Barclay Perkins Brewery by Gustave Doré (1872)

The brewery was established in 1616 by James Monger Sr. in Southwark, on land adjacent to the Globe Theatre. On his death, the brewery passed to his godson, James Monger Jr. James Child acquired the brewery after the younger Monger's death in 1670, and owned it until his death in 1696. His son in law, Edmund Halsey, managed the business with James Child from 1693, and subsequently as sole proprietor until his death in 1729. The brewery was then purchased by Ralph Thrale, the brewery manager and a nephew of Halsey, for £30,000 in instalments over 11 years.

Barclay Perkins & Co was founded in July 1781 after chief clerk John Perkins and Robert Barclay (of the banking family) acquired the Anchor Brewery from Henry Thrale's widow, Hester for £135,000, to be paid over four years. They additionally paid her for permission to keep using the Thrale & Co name until 1795. In 1782, 85,700 barrels were brewed.

By 1809 the venture had an annual output of 260,000 barrels, making it the largest brewery in the world. Between 1809 and 1853 the Anchor had the largest output of any brewery in London. The brewery produced exclusively porter until 1834, when it began to brew pale ale.

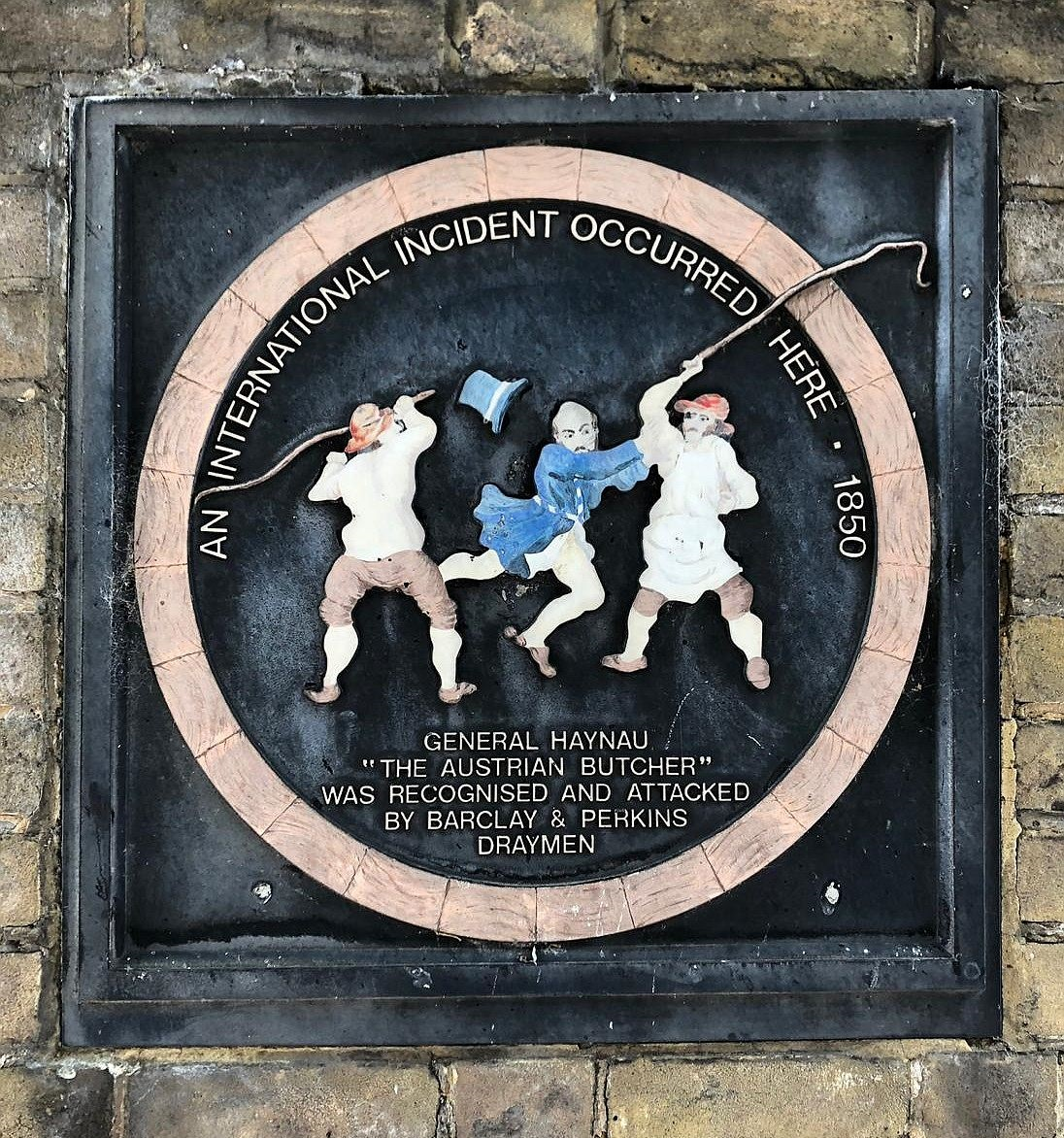
Plaque commemorating the attack on General von Haynau while touring the brewery in 1850

A fire at the brewery in May 1832, caused £40,000 worth of damage, destroying many buildings and resulting in considerable rebuilding of the site. The new brewery attracted considerable interest: visitors included the Prince of Wales, the German statesman Otto von Bismarck, Prince Louis-Napoléon Bonaparte, Ibrahim Pasha of Egypt, the Austrian general Julius Jacob von Haynau, who was attacked by draymen while touring the brewery in 1850, and the Italian nationalist Giuseppe Garibaldi in 1864.

In 1867, Barclay Perkins brewed 423,000 barrels.

Barclay Perkins was an early adopter of lager production in the UK, with the Anchor brewing lager from 1922.

In 1955, Barclay Perkins merged with rival London brewer Courage. Brewing continued at the Anchor site until the early 1970s. In 1981 the brewery buildings were demolished, although the former brewery tap, the Anchor Tavern, remains.

The brewery was well known for its Russian Imperial Stout, which continued to be brewed by Courage and later Scottish & Newcastle until 1993.

The nearby Anchor Terrace was built in 1834, after the fire of 1832, for senior employees of the brewery and stands on top of William Shakespeare's original Globe Theatre.

== See also ==
- Henry Thrale
- Anchor Brewhouse
- Anchor Bankside
