= Thomas Paley =

English cricketer

Thomas Paley (24 January 1803 – 21 September 1860) was an English barrister and cricketer.

== Life ==
He was the son of John Green Paley of Bradford. He matriculated at University College, Oxford in 1821, graduating B.A. in 1825. In 1828 he graduated M.A., and was called to the bar at Lincoln's Inn.

Paley was associated with Surrey and made his debut in 1829.

== Family ==
Paley married in 1833 Sophia, daughter of Henry Perkins.

== Bibliography ==
- Haygarth, Arthur (1996) [1862]. Scores & Biographies, Volume 1 (1744–1826). Kennington: Frederick Lillywhite. ISBN 978-19-00592-23-9.
- Haygarth, Arthur (1997) [1862]. Scores & Biographies, Volume 2 (1827–1840). Kennington: Frederick Lillywhite. ISBN 978-19-00592-23-9.
