= 2005–06 Premiership Rugby =

Rugby union competition in England

2005–06 Guinness Premiership
- Countries: England
- Champions: Sale Sharks (1st title)
- Runners-up: Leicester Tigers
- Relegated: Leeds Tykes
- Matches played: 135
- Attendance: 1,483,920 (average 10,992 per match)
- Top point scorer: (England) Charlie Hodgson (248 points)
- Top try scorer: (England) Tom Varndell (14 tries)

The 2005–06 Guinness Premiership was the 19th season of the top flight of the English domestic rugby union competitions, played between September 2005 and May 2006. The final was contested by the Sale Sharks and the Leicester Tigers at Twickenham. Sale Sharks won 45–20 to win the Premiership. Leeds Tykes were relegated, whilst Harlequins were promoted for the 2006-07 Guinness Premiership.

As per a tradition started in the previous year, two of the opening games of the season (round 1) were played at Twickenham, in the 2005 London Double Header.

== Participating teams ==
Locations of the 2005-06 Guinness Premiership teams

Team	Stadium	Capacity	City/Area
Bath	Recreation Ground	10,600	Bath, Somerset
Bristol	Memorial Stadium	11,916 (Note: Substantial ground upgrades including two temporary stands saw capacity at the Memorial Stadium went up from 8,500 to 11,916 ahead of the 2005–06 season.)	Bristol
Gloucester	Kingsholm	12,500	Gloucester, Gloucestershire
Leeds Tykes	Headingley Stadium (Note: Leeds Tykes would also play 1 home game on at Twickenham Stadium in London on 3 September 2005)	22,250	Leeds, West Yorkshire
Leicester Tigers	Welford Road	16,815	Leicester, Leicestershire
London Irish	Madejski Stadium	24,161	Reading, Berkshire
London Wasps	The Causeway Stadium (Note: London Wasps would also play 1 home game on at Twickenham Stadium in London on 3 September 2005)	10,000	High Wycombe, Buckinghamshire
Newcastle Falcons	Kingston Park	10,200	Newcastle upon Tyne, Tyne and Wear
Northampton Saints	Franklin's Gardens	13,600	Northampton, Northamptonshire
Sale	Edgeley Park	10,852	Stockport, Greater Manchester
Saracens	Vicarage Road	22,000	Watford, Hertfordshire
Worcester	Sixways	9,728	Worcester, Worcestershire

== Table ==
Pos	Team	Pld	W	D	L	PF	PA	PD	TF	TA	TB	LB	Pts	Qualification
1	Sale Sharks (C)	22	16	1	5	573	444	+129	52	42	6	2	74	Playoff place
2	Leicester Tigers (F)	22	14	3	5	518	415	+103	51	24	5	1	68	Playoff place
3	London Irish (SF)	22	14	0	8	493	454	+39	54	44	6	4	66	Playoff place
4	London Wasps (SF)	22	12	3	7	527	447	+80	53	42	7	3	64	Playoff place
5	Gloucester	22	11	1	10	483	385	+98	46	33	4	9	59	2006–07 Heineken Cup
6	Northampton Saints	22	10	1	11	464	488	−24	53	50	4	7	53	2006–07 Heineken Cup
7	Newcastle Falcons	22	9	1	12	416	433	−17	42	44	3	6	47	
8	Worcester Warriors	22	9	1	12	451	494	−43	40	56	3	6	47	
9	Bath	22	9	1	12	441	494	−53	38	49	3	5	46	
10	Saracens	22	8	1	13	433	483	−50	42	48	5	7	46	
11	Bristol	22	8	1	13	393	445	−52	28	41	0	7	41	
12	Leeds Tykes (R)	22	5	0	17	363	573	−210	36	62	1	7	28	Relegation place

Source: Guinness Premiership

== Results ==
=== Round 1 ===
2 September 2005
20:00

Sale Sharks	26–25	Newcastle Falcons

Edgeley Park
Attendance: 10,546

3 September 2005
14:00

London Wasps	23–11	Saracens

Twickenham
Attendance: 35,000

3 September 2005
15:00

Leicester Tigers	32–0	Northampton Saints

Welford Road
Attendance: 16,815

3 September 2005
16:20

Leeds Tykes	11–27	London Irish

Twickenham
Attendance: 35,000

4 September 2005
13:00

Bristol	19–16	Bath

Memorial Stadium
Attendance: 11,760

4 September 2005
15:00

Worcester Warriors	15–15	Gloucester

Sixways
Attendance: 9,728

=== Round 2 ===
10 September 2005
14:15

Bath	9–17	Northampton Saints

Recreation Ground
Attendance: 10,060

10 September 2005
14:45

London Wasps	29–29	Leicester Tigers

The Causeway Stadium
Attendance: 8,459

10 September 2005
15:00

Gloucester	21–18	Sale Sharks

Kingsholm
Attendance: 9,374

11 September 2005
14:30

Newcastle Falcons	14–16	Bristol

Kingston Park
Attendance: 6,661

11 September 2005
15:00

London Irish	15–20	Worcester Warriors

Madejski Stadium
Attendance: 7,118

11 September 2005
15:00

Saracens	34–16	Leeds Tykes

Vicarage Road
Attendance: 6,190

=== Round 3 ===
16 September 2005
20:00

Sale Sharks	29–3	London Irish

Edgeley Park
Attendance: 7,246

17 September 2005
14:00

Worcester Warriors	25–24	Saracens

Sixways
Attendance: 9,140

17 September 2005
14:45

Northampton Saints	9–16	Newcastle Falcons

Franklin’s Gardens
Attendance: 12,018

17 September 2005
15:00

Leicester Tigers	40–26	Bath

Welford Road
Attendance: 16,815

18 September 2005
14:30

Leeds Tykes	23–47	London Wasps

Headingley
Attendance: 4,544

18 September 2005
15:00

Bristol	9–41	Gloucester

Memorial Stadium
Attendance: 11,558

=== Round 4 ===
24 September 2005
14:45

Gloucester	28–24	Northampton Saints

Kingsholm
Attendance: 11,156

24 September 2005
15:00

London Irish	24–22	Bristol

Madejski Stadium
Attendance: 6,957

25 September 2005
14:30

Leeds Tykes	20–28	Leicester Tigers

Headingley
Attendance: 7,143

25 September 2005
14:30

Newcastle Falcons	16–27	Bath

Kingston Park
Attendance: 6,869

25 September 2005
15:00

London Wasps	34–20	Worcester Warriors

The Causeway Stadium
Attendance: 8,720

25 September 2005
15:00

Saracens	32–40	Sale Sharks

Vicarage Road
Attendance: 7,132

=== Round 5 ===
14 October 2005
19:45

Leicester Tigers	16–16	Newcastle Falcons

Welford Road
Attendance: 16,815

14 October 2005
20:00

Sale Sharks	18–10	London Wasps

Edgeley Park
Attendance: 9,916

14 October 2005
20:00

Worcester Warriors	22–15	Leeds Tykes

Sixways
Attendance: 9,626

15 October 2005
14:45

Bath	18–16	Gloucester

Recreation Ground
Attendance: 10,600

15 October 2005
15:00

Northampton Saints	25–23	London Irish

Franklin’s Gardens
Attendance: 13,262

16 October 2005
15:00

Bristol	11–23	Saracens

Memorial Stadium
Attendance: 7,068

=== Round 6 ===
4 November 2005
20:00

London Wasps	21–16	Bristol

The Causeway Stadium
Attendance: 7,901

4 November 2005
20:00

Worcester Warriors	15–11	Leicester Tigers

Sixways
Attendance: 9,776

5 November 2005
14:45

Leeds Tykes	11–17	Sale Sharks

Headingley
Attendance: 4,206

5 November 2005
15:00

Gloucester	27–20	Newcastle Falcons

Kingsholm
Attendance: 12,500

5 November 2005
15:00

London Irish	36–13	Bath

Madejski Stadium
Attendance: 9,458

5 November 2005
15:00

Saracens	28–22	Northampton Saints

Vicarage Road
Attendance: 8,524

=== Round 7 ===
11 November 2005
19:45

Newcastle Falcons	20–23	London Irish

Kingston Park
Attendance: 10,200

11 November 2005
20:00

Sale Sharks	24–13	Worcester Warriors

Edgeley Park
Attendance: 7,056

12 November 2005
12:30

Northampton Saints	13–21	London Wasps

Franklin’s Gardens
Attendance: 13,585

12 November 2005
15:00

Leicester Tigers	25–20	Gloucester

Welford Road
Attendance: 16,815

13 November 2005
14:15

Bath	12–12	Saracens

Recreation Ground
Attendance: 10,348

13 November 2005
15:00

Bristol	32–6	Leeds Tykes

Memorial Stadium
Attendance: 7,648

=== Round 8 ===
18 November 2005
20:00

Sale Sharks	24–16	Leicester Tigers

Edgeley Park
Attendance: 10,641

18 November 2005
20:00

Worcester Warriors	24–15	Bristol

Sixways
Attendance: 9,726

20 November 2005
14:30

Leeds Tykes	28–25	Northampton Saints

Headingley
Attendance: 4,564

20 November 2005
15:00

London Irish	25–10	Gloucester

Madejski Stadium
Attendance: 9,027

20 November 2005
15:00

London Wasps	28–20	Bath

The Causeway Stadium
Attendance: 8,656

20 November 2005
15:00

Saracens	27–18	Newcastle Falcons

Vicarage Road
Attendance: 9,413

=== Round 9 ===
25 November 2005
19:45

Bath	12–16	Leeds Tykes

Recreation Ground
Attendance: 9,957

25 November 2005
19:45

Leicester Tigers	35–3	London Irish

Welford Road
Attendance: 16,815

26 November 2005
12:30

Gloucester	19–8	Saracens

Kingsholm
Attendance: 10,516

26 November 2005
12:30

Northampton Saints	21–22	Worcester Warriors

Franklin’s Gardens
Attendance: 12,481

27 November 2005
14:30

Newcastle Falcons	17–15	London Wasps

Kingston Park
Attendance: 7,379

27 November 2005
15:00

Bristol	22–14	Sale Sharks

Memorial Stadium
Attendance: 7,518

=== Round 10 ===
26 December 2005
14:00

Worcester Warriors	18–36	Bath

Sixways
Attendance: 9,726

26 December 2005
15:00

London Wasps	32–25	Gloucester

The Causeway Stadium
Attendance: 10,000

26 December 2005
15:00

Sale Sharks	34–14	Northampton Saints

Edgeley Park
Attendance: 10,641

27 December 2005
14:30

Leeds Tykes	10–13	Newcastle Falcons

Headingley
Attendance: 11,601

27 December 2005
15:00

Bristol	15–3	Leicester Tigers

Memorial Stadium
Attendance: 11,916

27 December 2005
15:00

Saracens	19–20	London Irish

Vicarage Road
Attendance: 12,923

=== Round 11 ===
31 December 2005
14:45

London Irish	19–35	London Wasps

Madejski Stadium
Attendance: 18,122

31 December 2005
15:00

Gloucester	31–7	Leeds Tykes

Kingsholm
Attendance: 11,529

1 January 2006
14:30

Newcastle Falcons	21–15	Worcester Warriors

Kingston Park
Attendance: 8,864

1 January 2006
15:00

Northampton Saints	29–22	Bristol

Franklin’s Gardens
Attendance: 13,485

2 January 2006
14:15

Bath	9–21	Sale Sharks

Recreation Ground
Attendance: 10,600

2 January 2006
15:00

Leicester Tigers	34–27	Saracens

Welford Road
Attendance: 16,815

=== Round 12 ===
7 January 2006
14:45

Worcester Warriors	11–15	Northampton Saints

Sixways
Attendance: 9,726

8 January 2006
13:30

Saracens	9–19	Gloucester

Vicarage Road
Attendance: 6,493

8 January 2006
14:30

Leeds Tykes	25–14	Bath

Headingley
Attendance: 5,446

8 January 2006
15:00

London Irish	25–28	Leicester Tigers

Madejski Stadium
Attendance: 11,096

8 January 2006
15:00

London Wasps	21–6	Newcastle Falcons

The Causeway Stadium
Attendance: 10,000

8 January 2006
15:00

Sale Sharks	31–29	Bristol

Edgeley Park
Attendance: 9,686

=== Round 13 ===
27 January 2006
19:45

Bristol	23–26	Worcester Warriors

Memorial Stadium
Attendance: 9,058

28 January 2006
14:00

Bath	28–16	London Wasps

Recreation Ground
Attendance: 10,600

28 January 2006
15:00

Gloucester	9–13	London Irish

Kingsholm
Attendance: 10,710

28 January 2006
15:00

Leicester Tigers	27–27	Sale Sharks

Welford Road
Attendance: 16,815

28 January 2006
15:00

Newcastle Falcons	21–16	Saracens

Kingston Park
Attendance: 6,405

28 January 2006
15:00

Northampton Saints	21–18	Leeds Tykes

Franklin’s Gardens
Attendance: 13,448

=== Round 14 ===
10 February 2006
19:45

Gloucester	34–16	Leicester Tigers

Kingsholm
Attendance: 12,500

10 February 2006
20:00

Leeds Tykes	26–16	Bristol

Headingley
Attendance: 5,573

11 February 2006
14:00

Worcester Warriors	33–48	Sale Sharks

Sixways
Attendance: 9,726

12 February 2006
15:00

London Irish	6–9	Newcastle Falcons

Madejski Stadium
Attendance: 9,822

12 February 2006
15:00

London Wasps	19–19	Northampton Saints

The Causeway Stadium
Attendance: 8,143

12 February 2006
15:00

Saracens	29–34	Bath

Vicarage Road
Attendance: 6,731

=== Round 15 ===
17 February 2006
19:45

Leicester Tigers	28–22	Worcester Warriors

Welford Road
Attendance: 16,815

17 February 2006
20:00

Sale Sharks	35–24	Leeds Tykes

Edgeley Park
Attendance: 10,224

18 February 2006
14:15

Bath	28–33	London Irish

Recreation Ground
Attendance: 10,600

18 February 2006
14:45

Northampton Saints	58–17	Saracens

Franklin’s Gardens
Attendance: 13,523

19 February 2006
13:30

Bristol	9–9	London Wasps

Memorial Stadium
Attendance: 9,028

19 February 2006
14:30

Newcastle Falcons	9–13	Gloucester

Kingston Park
Attendance: 7,284

=== Round 16 ===
24 February 2006
19:45

Newcastle Falcons	24–16	Leicester Tigers

Kingston Park
Attendance: 10,200

24 February 2006
20:00

Leeds Tykes	21–15	Worcester Warriors

Headingley
Attendance: 3,718

25 February 2006
12:00

Gloucester	15–18	Bath

Kingsholm
Attendance: 12,500

26 February 2006
13:00

London Irish	30–3	Northampton Saints

Madejski Stadium
Attendance: 9,355

26 February 2006
15:00

London Wasps	26–16	Sale Sharks

The Causeway Stadium
Attendance: 10,000

26 February 2006
15:00

Saracens	13–19	Bristol

Vicarage Road
Attendance: 5,216

=== Round 17 ===
10 March 2006
19:45

Leicester Tigers	26–23	Leeds Tykes

Welford Road
Attendance: 16,815

10 March 2006
20:00

Sale Sharks	9–15	Saracens

Edgeley Park
Attendance: 9,307

10 March 2006
20:00

Worcester Warriors	37–8	London Wasps

Sixways
Attendance: 9,726

11 March 2006
14:15

Bath	20–18	Newcastle Falcons

Recreation Ground
Attendance: 10,600

11 March 2006
15:00

Northampton Saints	21–20	Gloucester

Franklin’s Gardens
Attendance: 13,443

12 March 2006
13:00

Bristol	20–21	London Irish

Memorial Stadium
Attendance: 7,258

=== Round 18 ===
25 March 2006
14:15

Bath	12–19	Leicester Tigers

Recreation Ground
Attendance: 10,600

25 March 2006
14:45

London Irish	21–29	Sale Sharks

Madejski Stadium
Attendance: 19,884

25 March 2006
15:00

Gloucester	15–20	Bristol

Kingsholm
Attendance: 11,517

26 March 2006
14:30

Newcastle Falcons	13–32	Northampton Saints

Kingston Park
Attendance: 7,364

26 March 2006
15:00

London Wasps	28–0	Leeds Tykes

The Causeway Stadium
Attendance: 8,186

26 March 2006
15:00

Saracens	29–15	Worcester Warriors

Vicarage Road
Attendance: 6,011

=== Round 19 ===
7 April 2006
20:00

Leeds Tykes	13–17	Saracens

Headingley
Attendance: 4,899

8 April 2006
13:45

Sale Sharks	18–15	Gloucester

Edgeley Park
Attendance: 10,140

8 April 2006
14:00

Worcester Warriors	10–12	London Irish

Sixways
Attendance: 9,726

8 April 2006
15:00

Northampton Saints	24–21	Bath

Franklin’s Gardens
Attendance: 13,454

9 April 2006
15:00

Bristol	23–7	Newcastle Falcons

Memorial Stadium
Attendance: 9,237

=== Round 20 ===
14 April 2006
19:45

Northampton Saints	19–24	Leicester Tigers

Franklin’s Gardens
Attendance: 13,493

15 April 2006
15:00

Gloucester	27–16	Worcester Warriors

Kingsholm
Attendance: 12,500

15 April 2006
15:00

London Irish	28–24	Leeds Tykes

Madejski Stadium
Attendance: 8,320

15 April 2006
17:15

Bath	31–16	Bristol

Recreation Ground
Attendance: 10,600

16 April 2006
14:30

Newcastle Falcons	32–21	Sale Sharks

Kingston Park
Attendance: 9,018

16 April 2006
15:00

Saracens	13–12	London Wasps

Vicarage Road
Attendance: 10,391

=== Rearranged fixture ===
22 April 2006
14:30

Leicester Tigers	20–19	London Wasps

Welford Road
Attendance: 16,815

=== Round 21 ===
28 April 2006
19:45

Saracens	12–13	Leicester Tigers

Vicarage Road
Attendance: 9,828

28 April 2006
20:00

Sale Sharks	38–12	Bath

Edgeley Park
Attendance: 10,641

29 April 2006
14:00

Worcester Warriors	35–27	Newcastle Falcons

Sixways
Attendance: 9,726

30 April 2006
14:30

Leeds Tykes	7–31	Gloucester

Headingley
Attendance: 4,452

30 April 2006
15:00

Bristol	16–19	Northampton Saints

Memorial Stadium
Attendance: 9,862

30 April 2006
18:00

London Wasps	37–56	London Irish

The Causeway Stadium
Attendance: 10,000

=== Round 22 ===
6 May 2006
15:00

Bath	25–22	Worcester Warriors

Recreation Ground
Attendance: 10,400

6 May 2006
15:00

Gloucester	32–37	London Wasps

Kingsholm
Attendance: 12,500

6 May 2006
15:00

Leicester Tigers	32–3	Bristol

Welford Road
Attendance: 16,815

6 May 2006
15:00

London Irish	30–18	Saracens

Madejski Stadium
Attendance: 11,352

6 May 2006
15:00

Newcastle Falcons	54–19	Leeds Tykes

Kingston Park
Attendance: 8,084

6 May 2006
15:00

Northampton Saints	34–36	Sale Sharks

Franklin’s Gardens
Attendance: 13,577

== Play-offs ==
=== Semi-finals ===
14 May 2006
13:30

Sale Sharks	22–12	London Wasps

Edgeley Park
Attendance: 10,641

14 May 2006
16:00

Leicester Tigers	40–8	London Irish

Welford Road
Attendance: 14,069

=== Final ===
27 May 2006
16:00

Sale Sharks	45–20	Leicester Tigers
Tries: Cueto 8' m Lund 17' m Oriol Ripol 40' c Mayor 80' c Con: Hodgson (1/3); Courrent (1/1); Pen: Hodgson (6) 3', 31', 45', 49', 64', 78'; DG: Hodgson 71'	Report 1 Report 2	Tries: Moody 10' c Hamilton 70' c Con: Goode (2/2); Pen: Goode (2) 35', 43'

Twickenham Stadium
Attendance: 58,000
Referee: Dave Pearson

Team details

Sale Sharks
Leicester Tigers

FB	15	(England) Jason Robinson (c)
RW	14	(England) Mark Cueto
OC	13	(Wales) Mark Taylor	(substituted off) 67'
IC	12	(Samoa) Elvis Seveali'i
LW	11	(Spain) Oriol Ripol	(substituted off) 78'
FH	10	(England) Charlie Hodgson
SH	9	(England) Richard Wigglesworth	(substituted off) 74'
N8	8	(France) Sébastien Chabal
OF	7	(England) Magnus Lund
BF	6	(Scotland) Jason White
RL	5	(England) Chris Jones	(substituted off) 75'
LL	4	(Argentina) Ignacio Fernández Lobbe	(substituted off) 40'
TP	3	(England) Stuart Turner
HK	2	(England) Andy Titterell	(substituted off) 52'
LP	1	(France) Lionel Faure	(substituted off) 54'
Replacements:
HK	16	(France) Sébastien Bruno	(substituted on) 52'
PR	17	(Scotland) Barry Stewart	(substituted on) 54'
LK	18	(England) Dean Schofield	(substituted on) 40'
LK	19	(England) Christian Day	(substituted on) 75'
SH	20	(England) Ben Foden	(substituted on) 74'
FH	21	(France) Valentin Courrent	(substituted on) 78'
CE	22	(England) Chris Mayor	(substituted on) 67'
Coach:
(France) Philippe Saint-André

FB	15	(Ireland) Geordan Murphy
RW	14	(Samoa) Alesana Tuilagi	(substituted off) 46'
OC	13	(England) Ollie Smith
IC	12	(New Zealand) Daryl Gibson
LW	11	(England) Tom Varndell
FH	10	(England) Andy Goode
SH	9	(England) Harry Ellis	(substituted off) 52'
N8	8	(England) Martin Corry (c)
OF	7	(Ireland) Shane Jennings	(substituted off) 51'
BF	6	(England) Lewis Moody
RL	5	(England) Ben Kay
LL	4	(Ireland) Leo Cullen	(substituted off) 55'
TP	3	(England) Julian White
HK	2	(England) George Chuter	(substituted off) 63'
LP	1	(England) Graham Rowntree	(substituted off) 60'
Replacements:
HK	16	(England) James Buckland	(substituted on) 63'
PR	17	(England) Michael Holford	(substituted on) 60'
LK	18	(Scotland) Jim Hamilton	(substituted on) 55'
FL	19	(England) Louis Deacon	(substituted on) 51'
SH	20	(England) Austin Healey	(substituted on) 52'
WG	21	(England) Leon Lloyd
FB	22	(England) Sam Vesty	(substituted on) 46'
Coach:
(Australia) Pat Howard

== Sky Sports Dream Team 2005/06 ==
15 Matt Burke (Newcastle Falcons) 14 Tom Varndell (Leicester Tigers) 13 Mathew Tait (Newcastle Falcons) 12 Mike Catt (London Irish) 11 Tom Voyce (London Wasps) 10 Carlos Spencer (Northampton Saints) 9 Justin Marshall (Leeds Tykes) 1 Tony Windo (Worcester Warriors) 2 Mark Regan (Bristol) 3 Cobus Visagie (Saracens) 4 Danny Grewcock (Bath Rugby) 5 Ben Kay (Leicester Tigers) 6 Matt Salter (captain, Bristol) 7 Magnus Lund (Sale Sharks) 8 Juan Manuel Leguizamón (London Irish)

== Top scorers ==
Note: Flags to the left of player names indicate national team as has been defined under World Rugby eligibility rules, or primary nationality for players who did not earn international senior caps. Players may hold one or more non-WR nationalities.

=== Most points ===
Rank	Name	Club	Points
1	(England) Charlie Hodgson	Sale Sharks	248
2	(Wales) Jason Strange	Bristol	244
3	(New Zealand) Glen Jackson	Saracens	238
4	(Australia) Shane Drahm	Worcester Warriors	233
5	(England) Andy Goode	Leicester Tigers	225
6	(France) Ludovic Mercier	Gloucester	213
7	(England) Mark van Gisbergen	London Wasps	211
8	(New Zealand) Bruce Reihana	Northampton Saints	206
9	(Australia) Matt Burke	Newcastle Falcons	142
10	(Australia) Chris Malone	Bath	130

=== Most tries ===
Rank	Player	Team	Tries
1	(England) Tom Varndell	Leicester Tigers	14
2	(England) Tom Voyce	London Wasps	10
3	(England) Delon Armitage	London Irish	8
3	(England) Tom Biggs	Leeds Tykes	8
3	(Australia) Matt Burke	Newcastle Falcons	8
3	(England) Anthony Elliott	Newcastle Falcons	8
3	(Samoa) David Lemi	Bristol	8
3	(England) Paul Sackey	London Wasps	8
9	(England) Ben Cohen	Northampton Saints	7
9	(New Zealand) Riki Flutey	London Irish	7
9	(England) Topsy Ojo	London Irish	7
9	(England) Dan Scarbrough	Saracens	7
