= 2000–01 Heineken Cup =

International rugby union competition

Tournament details
- Countries: England; France; Ireland; Italy; Scotland; Wales
- Tournament format(s): Round-robin and Knockout
- Date: 6 October 2000 – 19 May 2001

Tournament statistics
- Teams: 24
- Matches played: 79
- Attendance: 646,834 (8,188 per match)
- Top point scorer(s): Diego Domínguez (Stade Français) (188 points)
- Top try scorer(s): Matthew Robinson (Swansea) (9 tries)

Final
- Venue: Parc des Princes, Paris
- Attendance: 44,000
- Champions: (England) Leicester Tigers (1st title)
- Runners-up: (France) Stade Français Paris

The 2000–01 Heineken Cup was the sixth edition of the Heineken Cup, a rugby union tournament. Competing teams from France, Ireland, Italy, Wales, England and Scotland, were divided into six pools of four, in which teams played home and away matches against each other. The pool winners and two best runners-up qualified for the knock-out stages.

== Teams ==
| France | England | Wales | Scotland | Ireland | Italy |
|---|---|---|---|---|---|
| Biarritz Olympique; Stade Français; Toulouse; Castres; Colomiers; Pau | Northampton; London Wasps; Saracens; Bath; Gloucester Rugby; Leicester Tigers | Swansea; Cardiff; Newport; Llanelli; Pontypridd | Edinburgh Reivers; Glasgow Caledonians | Leinster; Ulster; Munster | L'Aquila; Roma |

== Pool stage ==
In the pool matches teams received

- 2 points for a win
- 1 points for a draw

=== Pool 1 ===
| Team | P | W | D | L | Tries for | Tries against | Try diff | Points for | Points against | Points diff | Pts |
|---|---|---|---|---|---|---|---|---|---|---|---|
| (France) Biarritz Olympique | 6 | 4 | 0 | 2 | 13 | 20 | −7 | 164 | 152 | 12 | 8 |
| (Scotland) Edinburgh Reivers | 6 | 3 | 1 | 2 | 17 | 12 | 5 | 154 | 141 | 13 | 7 |
| (Ireland) Leinster | 6 | 3 | 1 | 2 | 13 | 14 | −1 | 149 | 156 | −7 | 7 |
| (England) Northampton | 6 | 1 | 0 | 5 | 17 | 14 | 3 | 138 | 156 | −18 | 2 |

Edinburgh finished above Leinster despite having a lower points difference, as the first tie-breaker was the results in the two matches between the teams.

=== Pool 2 ===
| Team | P | W | D | L | Tries for | Tries against | Try diff | Points for | Points against | Points diff | Pts |
|---|---|---|---|---|---|---|---|---|---|---|---|
| (France) Stade Français Paris | 6 | 5 | 0 | 1 | 36 | 4 | 32 | 297 | 85 | 212 | 10 |
| (Wales) Swansea | 6 | 4 | 0 | 2 | 28 | 11 | 17 | 244 | 123 | 121 | 8 |
| (England) Wasps | 6 | 3 | 0 | 3 | 20 | 14 | 6 | 175 | 156 | 19 | 6 |
| (Italy) L'Aquila | 6 | 0 | 0 | 6 | 3 | 58 | −55 | 40 | 392 | −352 | 0 |

=== Pool 3 ===
| Team | P | W | D | L | Tries for | Tries against | Try diff | Points for | Points against | Points diff | Pts |
|---|---|---|---|---|---|---|---|---|---|---|---|
| (Wales) Cardiff | 6 | 4 | 0 | 2 | 18 | 13 | 5 | 182 | 146 | 36 | 8 |
| (England) Saracens | 6 | 4 | 0 | 2 | 14 | 13 | 1 | 174 | 140 | 34 | 8 |
| (France) Toulouse | 6 | 2 | 1 | 3 | 19 | 15 | 4 | 171 | 182 | −11 | 5 |
| (Ireland) Ulster | 6 | 1 | 1 | 4 | 11 | 21 | −10 | 146 | 205 | −59 | 3 |

Cardiff won the pool despite having a lower points difference than Saracens, as the first tie-breaker was the results in the two matches between the teams.

=== Pool 4 ===
| Team | P | W | D | L | Tries for | Tries against | Try diff | Points for | Points against | Points diff | Pts |
|---|---|---|---|---|---|---|---|---|---|---|---|
| (Ireland) Munster | 6 | 5 | 0 | 1 | 15 | 7 | 8 | 154 | 109 | 45 | 10 |
| (England) Bath | 6 | 4 | 0 | 2 | 14 | 11 | 3 | 139 | 106 | 33 | 8 |
| (Wales) Newport | 6 | 2 | 0 | 4 | 10 | 22 | −12 | 122 | 183 | −61 | 4 |
| (France) Castres | 6 | 1 | 0 | 5 | 14 | 13 | 1 | 135 | 152 | −17 | 2 |

=== Pool 5 ===
| Team | P | W | D | L | Tries for | Tries against | Try diff | Points for | Points against | Points diff | Pts |
|---|---|---|---|---|---|---|---|---|---|---|---|
| (England) Gloucester | 6 | 4 | 1 | 1 | 13 | 11 | 2 | 186 | 140 | 46 | 9 |
| (Wales) Llanelli | 6 | 4 | 0 | 2 | 18 | 8 | 10 | 187 | 103 | 84 | 8 |
| (France) Colomiers | 6 | 3 | 1 | 2 | 14 | 11 | 3 | 148 | 120 | 28 | 7 |
| (Italy) Roma | 6 | 0 | 0 | 6 | 10 | 25 | −15 | 88 | 246 | −158 | 0 |

=== Pool 6 ===
| Team | P | W | D | L | Tries for | Tries against | Try diff | Points for | Points against | Points diff | Pts |
|---|---|---|---|---|---|---|---|---|---|---|---|
| (England) Leicester | 6 | 5 | 0 | 1 | 15 | 9 | 6 | 178 | 105 | 73 | 10 |
| (France) Pau | 6 | 4 | 0 | 2 | 19 | 10 | 9 | 154 | 142 | 12 | 8 |
| (Wales) Pontypridd | 6 | 2 | 0 | 4 | 9 | 12 | −3 | 136 | 131 | 5 | 4 |
| (Scotland) Glasgow Caledonians | 6 | 1 | 0 | 5 | 12 | 24 | −12 | 137 | 227 | −90 | 2 |

== Seeding ==
| Seed | Pool Winners | Pts | TF | +/− |
|---|---|---|---|---|
| 1 | (France) Stade Français Paris | 10 | 36 | +212 |
| 2 | (England) Leicester Tigers | 10 | 15 | +73 |
| 3 | (Ireland) Munster | 10 | 15 | +45 |
| 4 | (England) Gloucester | 9 | 13 | +46 |
| 5 | (Wales) Cardiff | 8 | 18 | +36 |
| 6 | (France) Biarritz Olympique | 8 | 13 | +12 |
| Seed | Pool Runners-up | Pts | TF | +/− |
| 7 | (Wales) Swansea | 8 | 28 | +121 |
| 8 | (France) Pau | 8 | 19 | +12 |
| – | (Wales) Llanelli | 8 | 18 | +84 |
| – | (England) Saracens | 8 | 14 | +34 |
| – | (England) Bath | 8 | 14 | +33 |
| – | (Scotland) Edinburgh Reivers | 7 | 17 | +13 |

== Knockout stage ==
=== Quarter-finals ===
27 January 2001
14:00

| Gloucester (England) | 21–15 | (Wales) Cardiff |

Kingsholm
Attendance: 10,800

27 January 2001
14:10

| Stade Francais (France) | 36–19 | (France) Pau |

Stade Jean-Bouin
Attendance: 8,000

28 January 2001
14:10

| Leicester Tigers (England) | 41–10 | (Wales) Swansea |

Welford Road
Attendance: 13,000

28 January 2001
14:45

| Munster (Ireland) | 38–29 | (France) Biarritz Olympique |

Thomond Park
Attendance: 14,000

=== Semi-finals ===
21 April 2001
15:00

| Stade Francais (France) | 16–15 | (Ireland) Munster |
| | Report |

Stadium Lille Métropole
Attendance: 20,400

21 April 2001
15:00

| Leicester Tigers (England) | 19–15 | (England) Gloucester |

Vicarage Road
Attendance: 14,010

=== Final ===
19 May 2001
15:00 CEST

| Stade Français Paris (France) | 30–34 | (England) Leicester Tigers |
| Pen: Dominguez (9) 4', 16', 21', 27', 39', 46', 57', 68', 71'; Drop: Dominguez 77' | Report | Tries: Lloyd (2) 41' m, 79' c Back 59' c Con: Stimpson (2); Pen: Stimpson (5) 6', 10', 30', 64', 73' |

Parc des Princes, Paris
Attendance: 44,000
Referee: David McHugh (Ireland)

Going into the final stages of the game, the scores were level at 27–27. A drop goal from Diego Domínguez then put Stade three points ahead. Meanwhile, Leicester brought on replacement scrum-half Jamie Hamilton for starting fly-half Andy Goode, with starting scrum-half Austin Healey switching to fly-half. Glenn Gelderbloom was also brought on at outside centre, with Leon Lloyd switching from outside centre to wing.

Leicester won a penalty just inside their own half and kicked to the left-hand touchline. The resulting line-out throw was too high and but it was cleaned up by Neil Back at the back of the line. Back passed the ball to out to Healey, though the pass forced Healey to check his run to gather the ball. With the two sets of opposing backs 20 metres apart for the line-out, the Tigers backs executed a pre-called backs move. Healey would dummy scissors with inside centre Pat Howard, another dummy scissors with outside centre Glenn Gelderbloom before the ball would be passed to the big full back Tim Stimpson who would take the ball into contact. Howard drew Domínguez and Gelderbloom drew the Stade inside centre, but the Stade outside centre who had only been on the field a few minutes, drifted onto Stimpson. Healey broke the Stade defensive line through the gap, before drawing the full back and putting Leon Lloyd in the right hand corner.

Lloyd's second try of the game gave Leicester a two-point lead, with the conversion to come. If Stimpson missed, another goal would give Stade the lead. If he scored the conversion, however, Stade would need a try. The kick from the right-hand touchline was from the most difficult position on the field for a right-footed kicker. Stimpson however hit the conversion straight between the posts, and Leicester were able to hang on to their lead for victory.
