= 2002 Heineken Cup final =

2002 Heineken Cup Final
- Event: 2001–02 Heineken Cup
Leicester Tigers	Munster
(England)	(Ireland)
15	9
- Date: 25 May 2002
- Venue: Millennium Stadium, Cardiff
- Referee: Joël Jutge (France)
- Attendance: 74,600

The 2002 Heineken Cup Final was the final match of the 2001–02 Heineken Cup, the seventh season of Europe's top club rugby union competition. The match was played on 25 May 2002 at the Millennium Stadium in Cardiff; this was the third time the final had been played in Cardiff after the 1996 and 1997 finals, but the first since the opening of the Millennium Stadium, which was built on the site of the old Cardiff Arms Park for the 1999 Rugby World Cup.

The match was contested by Leicester Tigers of England and Munster of Ireland. Munster were appearing in their second final after losing the 2000 Heineken Cup Final to Northampton Saints. Tigers were the defending champions having beaten Stade Français in the 2001 Heineken Cup Final and were appearing in their third final after losing the 1997 final to Brive.

Leicester Tigers won the match 15–9, becoming the first team to successfully defend the trophy. In the first minute, Tigers had a try by Freddie Tuilagi ruled out for illegal blocking on Munster wing John Kelly. Munster took a 3–0 lead from Ronan O'Gara's penalty before Tigers had a second try ruled out inside the first 10 minutes, Martin Johnson had pounced on a Frankie Sheahan over throw but referee Joël Jutge was not ready and the throw re-taken. After 20 minutes O'Gara slotted his second penalty for a 6–0 lead after Lewis Moody had been ruled offside. Geordan Murphy scored Tigers first try after a sweeping break from Tim Stimpson and dummy before finding Murphy to make it 6–5 when the conversion was missed. A scrum penalty against Darren Garforth gave O'Gara his third penalty goal for a 9–5 lead.

However, once Harry Ellis, a try scorer in the semi-final, was introduced on 52 minutes, the game swung into Leicester's favour. Tigers turned down kicks at goal in search of the try that came when Austin Healey darted over, Tim Stimpson's conversion gave Leicester a 12–9 lead. O'Gara missed an opportunity to level the scorers, and seconds later Stimpson slotted the last points of the game for a 15–9 final score. More drama was to come, as Munster wing Kelly thought he had scored in the corner, only to be denied by a last-ditch cover tackle by man of the match Healey.

In the closing moments of the match, Munster had a midfield scrum close to the 5m line in Leicester's half. With the referee distracted on the other side of the scrum, Leicester's openside flanker Neil Back knocked the ball illegally from Munster scrum-half Peter Stringer's hands before the put-in and Leicester won possession and cleared the ball. This incident was dubbed the "Hand of Back" after the match by the press in reference to Argentinian football player Diego Maradona's "Hand of God" goal scored in the 1986 FIFA World Cup, and was named by The Daily Telegraph in 2022 as "rugby's most famous act of gamesmanship".

== Match details ==
25 May 2002
15:00 BST

Leicester Tigers (England)	15–9	(Ireland) Munster
Try: Murphy 26' m Healey 59' c Con: Stimpson 59'; Pen: Stimpson 70'	Report	Pen: O'Gara 7', 20', 49'

Millennium Stadium, Cardiff
Attendance: 74,600
Referee: Joël Jutge (France)

Leicester Tigers	Munster

FB	15	(England) Tim Stimpson
RW	14	(Ireland) Geordan Murphy
OC	13	(England) Ollie Smith	(substituted off) 78'
IC	12	(Australia) Rod Kafer
LW	11	(Samoa) Freddie Tuilagi
FH	10	(England) Austin Healey
SH	9	(England) Jamie Hamilton	(substituted off) 52'
N8	8	(England) Martin Corry
OF	7	(England) Neil Back
BF	6	(England) Lewis Moody
RL	5	(England) Ben Kay
LL	4	(England) Martin Johnson (c)
TP	3	(England) Darren Garforth
HK	2	(England) Dorian West
LP	1	(England) Graham Rowntree	(substituted off) 74'
Replacements:
SH	16	(England) Harry Ellis	(substituted on) 52'
PR	17	(England) Perry Freshwater	(substituted on) 74'
CE	18	(South Africa) Glenn Gelderbloom	(substituted on) 78'
HK	19	(England) Richard Cockerill
N8	20	(England) Will Johnson
FL	21	(New Zealand) Josh Kronfeld
FH	22	(England) Andy Goode
Coach:
(England) Dean Richards

FB	15	(Ireland) Dominic Crotty	(substituted off) 66'
RW	14	(Ireland) John Kelly
OC	13	(Ireland) Rob Henderson	(substituted off) 68'
IC	12	(Ireland) Jason Holland
LW	11	(Ireland) John O'Neill
FH	10	(Ireland) Ronan O'Gara
SH	9	(Ireland) Peter Stringer
N8	8	(Ireland) Anthony Foley	(substituted off) 53'
OF	7	(Ireland) David Wallace
BF	6	(Ireland) Alan Quinlan
RL	5	(Ireland) Paul O'Connell	(substituted off) 62'
LL	4	(Ireland) Mick Galwey (c)
TP	3	(Ireland) John Hayes
HK	2	(Ireland) Frankie Sheahan	(substituted off) 18'	(substituted on) 29'
LP	1	(Ireland) Peter Clohessy	(substituted off) 61'
Replacements:
HK	16	(Ireland) James Blaney	(substituted on) 18'	(substituted off) 29'
FL	17	(Australia) Jim Williams	(substituted on) 53'
PR	18	(Ireland) Marcus Horan	(substituted on) 61'
LK	19	(Ireland) Mick O'Driscoll	(substituted on) 62'
FH	20	(Ireland) Jeremy Staunton	(substituted on) 66'
WG	21	(Ireland) Mike Mullins	(substituted on) 68'
SH	22	(Ireland) Mike Prendergast
Coach:
(Ireland) Declan Kidney

== See also ==
- 2001–02 Heineken Cup
