= Lewis Moody =

British Lions & England international rugby union player (born 1978)

Lewis Moody MBE
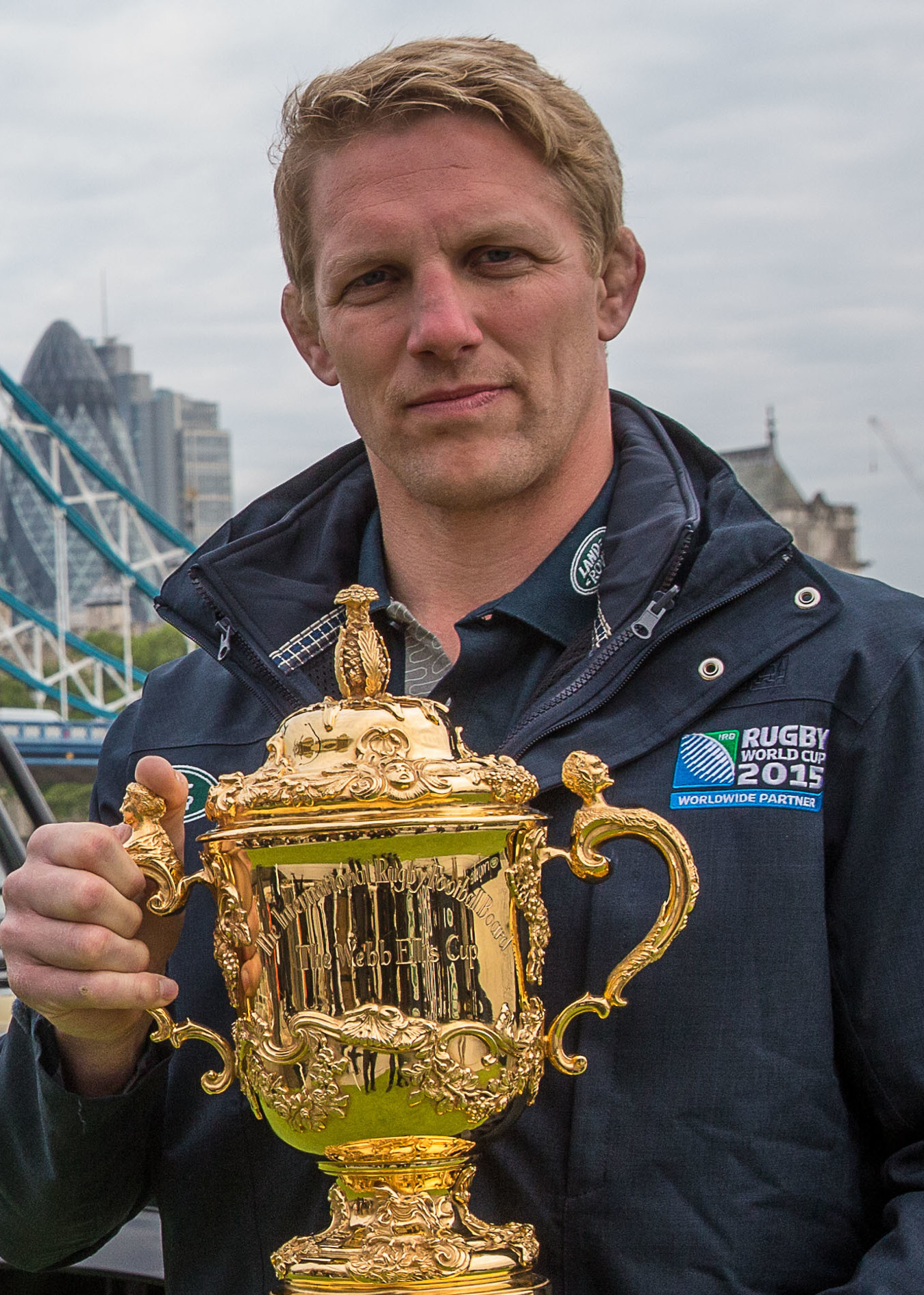
- Moody holding the Webb Ellis Cup in 2015
- Born: Lewis Walton Moody; 12 June 1978 (age 48) Ascot, Berkshire, England
- Height: 1.91 m (6 ft 3 in)
- Weight: 102 kg (16 st 1 lb; 225 lb)
- School: Oakham School
- University: De Montfort University

Rugby union career
- Position: Flanker
Senior career
Years	Team	Apps	(Points)
1996–2010	Leicester Tigers	223	(165)
2010–2012	Bath Rugby	34	(5)
- Correct as of 30 July 2010
International career
Years	Team	Apps	(Points)
2001–2011	England	71	(45)
2005	British and Irish Lions	2	(5)
- Correct as of 25 January 2010

Lewis Walton Moody (born 12 June 1978 in Ascot) is an English retired rugby union player. He played for Leicester Tigers and Bath and was part of the 2003 World Cup winning side. Moody was chosen for the 2005 British & Irish Lions tour to New Zealand, being capped twice. He is known for the enthusiasm with which he played the game, his willingness to chase down opponents and his ability to compete for possession at restarts, which earned him the nickname "Mad Dog" from teammates and supporters.

== Background ==
When Moody was five, he took up mini rugby at Bracknell, when a school friend suggested he join him. He played at Bracknell until the age of 12. He was educated at Eagle House Prep School, then Oakham School in Rutland, where he initially played rugby union at centre before moving to full back. He later studied Business Administration at De Montfort University while playing for Leicester Tigers.

== Club career ==
Moody's meeting Ed Houston signalled the beginning of his rugby career. In the Leicester Tigers youth team, he played flanker. He became the youngest Leicester Tigers' player to play a league game at 18 years and 94 days, a record now surpassed by Ben Youngs. He soon became established as Neil Back's understudy for the openside flanker shirt. Making the Tigers starting XV was difficult however, as internationals Neil Back and Martin Corry took two of the three starting positions, with Paul Gustard and Will Johnson (younger brother of Martin) fighting for the remaining place.

Moody was an unused replacement for the 2001 Heineken Cup Final but started the victorious 2002 Heineken Cup Final, and was a member of the Tigers side in the four Premiership winning seasons in 1999, 2000, 2001 and 2002. The arrival of New Zealand international openside Josh Kronfeld at Leicester in 2001, threatened to relegate Moody to third choice openside. However, Kronfeld failed to settle at the club and despite offers from Harlequins and Bath, Moody decided to stay. After the World Cup success in 2003, he suffered a stress fracture of his foot which took a long time to heal and kept him out of the remaining 2003–04 season. Moody made a return in October 2004, in the Heineken European Cup match against Calvisano.

Moody won his fifth Premiership medal in 2007, starting the final and scoring a try as Leicester defeated Gloucester.

He was injured for much of the 2008–2009 season, which was his Testimonial season for the club, but returned to play in the 73–3 win over Bristol, and featured in both the Heineken Cup final and the Guinness Premiership win. Moody stayed fit for the entire 2009–2010 season, and even captained the side in the home fixture against Sale. The Tigers won the 2009–10 Guinness Premiership, beating Saracens 33–27 at Twickenham.

In the 2010–2011 season, he joined Bath Rugby on a three-year deal along with Sam Vesty.

Moody picked up a knee ligament injury in Bath's 55–16 win over Aironi in January 2011 but had been confident of making the England team for their opening Six Nations clash with Wales on 4 February.

Moody announced his retirement from rugby on 6 March 2012 with immediate effect due to injuries.

== International career ==
Moody in action for England

Moody scored two tries for England Colts against Wales in April 1997, and was a member of the side that won the Madrid Sevens at the end of that season. He was later called up to the senior team for the 1998–99 "tour from hell" but did not make an appearance.

Moody made his England debut against Canada on 2 June 2001, when the established internationals Neil Back and Richard Hill were touring Australia with the British and Irish Lions. He won a further two caps on the North American tour and scored a try against the US Eagles in San Francisco. He was then called up to the senior squad for the match against Ireland in Dublin in October 2001 and came on to win cap number four.

Continued impressive form saw him challenge his teammate, Neil Back, for the coveted England No.7 shirt, starting in two Six Nations games the following season. Moody displaced Lawrence Dallaglio from the first choice England XV for the 2002/3 autumn internationals scoring a try in the game against New Zealand, but was injured against South Africa and Dallaglio regained his place. He returned to fitness and again featured in Clive Woodward's plans, but a further injury in the first Six Nations match against France threatened to curtail the rest of his season.

He was not considered for the summer tour due to that injury, but recovered well enough to play in the pre-world cup friendlies against France and Wales in the summer, scoring a try in the game at the Millennium Stadium.

He played a part in all seven World Cup matches and came on as a replacement in the final to replace Hill. He won the final line-out in the phase of play which led to Jonny Wilkinson's winning drop goal. He missed the remaining 2003–4 season due to a foot injury. With the retirement of Dallaglio and Back, and Hill out injured, he started all three of England's autumn internationals. Moody remained an England mainstay into 2005. That year he became the first English player to be sent off at Twickenham, when he was dismissed for fighting during the autumn international with Leicester teammate Alex Tuilagi.

Having missed the 2007 Six Nations Championship through injury, Moody was selected as part of the England squad for the 2007 World Cup in France. Having been named to start a warm up match against France Moody suffered a further injury and consequently was left out of the starting line up for England's first three games of the campaign. Following a disappointing start to the tournament Moody was called into the starting line up for the final pool match against Tonga, where he was lauded for England's much improved competition at the breakdown.

Moody kept his place in the starting line up for the quarter-final against Australia where he 'outshone his illustrious opposite number' George Smith. Moody again started the semi-final against France, and lined up against South Africa in the World Cup final on 20 October, which England narrowly lost to the southern hemisphere side.

He was picked for the 2008 Six Nations Championship and started in the first game against Wales but was substituted in the first half because of an Achilles tendon injury. He returned to play against the Barbarians in June 2009, but was subsequently dropped from the squad, and appeared in the England Saxons EPS for the 2009–10 Season. Club form and injuries to other opensides such as Tom Rees saw him regain his England starting position for the Autumn Internationals against Australia, Argentina, and New Zealand. He continued this form into the 2010 Six Nations Championship.

Moody captained England in their final 2010 Six Nations Championship match against France in Paris, replacing regular captain Steve Borthwick, who had to pull out due to injury. He was also named England Captain for the 2010 summer tour to Australia.

Due to the knee injury he picked up in January 2011, Moody missed the whole of the 2011 Six Nations tournament. However, Martin Johnson announced that Moody would be England captain for the 2011 Rugby World Cup in New Zealand, provided he was fit. He was selected in the 30-man squad that flew to New Zealand.

On 23 October 2011, Moody announced his retirement from international rugby.

=== International tries ===
==== England ====
Try	Opposing team	Location	Venue	Competition	Date	Result	Score
1	United States	San Francisco, United States	Boxer Stadium	2001 England rugby union tour of North America	16 June 2001	Win	19 – 48
2	Romania	London, England	Twickenham Stadium	2001 end-of-year rugby union internationals	17 November 2001	Win	134 – 0
3	Romania	London, England	Twickenham Stadium	2001 end-of-year rugby union internationals	17 November 2001	Win	134 – 0
4	New Zealand	London, England	Twickenham Stadium	2002 end-of-year rugby union internationals	9 November 2002	Win	31 – 28
5	Wales	Cardiff, Wales	Millennium Stadium	2003 Rugby World Cup warm-up matches	23 August 2003	Win	9 – 43
6	Uruguay	Brisbane, Australia	Suncorp Stadium	2003 Rugby World Cup	2 November 2003	Win	111 – 13
7	Canada	London, England	Twickenham Stadium	2004 end-of-year rugby union internationals	13 November 2004	Win	70 – 0
8	Australia	London, England	Twickenham Stadium	2004 end-of-year rugby union internationals	27 November 2004	Loss	19 – 21
9	Wales	London, England	Twickenham Stadium	2006 Six Nations Championship	4 February 2006	Win	47 – 13

==== British & Irish Lions ====
Try	Opposing team	Location	Venue	Competition	Date	Result	Score
1	New Zealand	Auckland, New Zealand	Eden Park	2005 British & Irish Lions tour to New Zealand	9 July 2005	Loss	38 – 19

== Personal life ==
Moody married Annie (an interior designer) in June 2006. The couple live in Bradford-on-Avon and have two children. One of their children, Dylan Moody, plays for Southampton FC

In May 2014, Lewis and Annie set up The Lewis Moody Foundation, to fund research into the diagnosis and treatment of brain tumours and support the families of those with brain tumours.

In August 2014, Moody was one of 200 public figures who were signatories to a letter to The Guardian opposing Scottish independence in the run-up to September's referendum on that issue.

In October 2025, Moody announced that he had been diagnosed with motor neurone disease (MND).

== Honours ==
England

- Six Nations Championship: 2000, 2001, 2003
- Grand Slam: 2003
- Triple Crown: 2002, 2003
- World Cup: 2003

Leicester Tigers

- Premiership Rugby: 1999, 2000, 2001, 2002, 2007, 2009, 2010
- European Cup: 2001, 2002
- Anglo-Welsh Cup: 2007

== See also ==
- List of people diagnosed with ulcerative colitis

Sporting positions
Preceded by Steve Borthwick	English National Rugby Union Captain; Mar 2010 - Nov 2011	Succeeded by Chris Robshaw
