= 2001 Heineken Cup final =

2001 Heineken Cup Final
- Event: 2000–01 Heineken Cup
Leicester Tigers	Stade Français
(England)	(France)
34	30
- Date: 19 May 2001
- Venue: Parc des Princes, Paris
- Referee: David McHugh (Ireland)
- Attendance: 44,000

The 2001 Heineken Cup Final was the final match of the 2000–01 Heineken Cup, the sixth season of Europe's top club rugby union competition. The match was played on 19 May 2001 at the Parc des Princes in Paris. The match was contested by Stade Français of France and Leicester Tigers of England. Leicester Tigers won the match 34–30.

Going into the final stages of the game, the scores were level at 27–27. A drop goal from Diego Domínguez then put Stade three points ahead. Meanwhile, Leicester brought on replacement scrum-half Jamie Hamilton for starting fly-half Andy Goode, with starting scrum-half Austin Healey switching to fly-half. Glenn Gelderbloom was also brought on at outside centre, with Leon Lloyd switching from outside centre to wing.

Leicester won a penalty just inside their own half and kicked to the left-hand touchline. The resulting line-out throw was too high and but it was cleaned up by Neil Back at the back of the line. Back passed the ball to out to Healey, though the pass forced Healey to check his run to gather the ball. With the two sets of opposing backs 20 metres apart for the line-out, the Tigers backs executed a pre-called backs move. Healey would dummy scissors with inside centre Pat Howard, another dummy scissors with outside centre Glenn Gelderbloom before the ball would be passed to the big full back Tim Stimpson who would take the ball into contact. Howard drew Domínguez and Gelderbloom drew the Stade inside centre, but the Stade outside centre who had only been on the field a few minutes, drifted onto Stimpson. Healey broke the Stade defensive line through the gap, before drawing the full back and putting Leon Lloyd in the right hand corner.

Lloyd's second try of the game gave Leicester a two-point lead, with the conversion to come. If Stimpson missed, another goal would give Stade the lead. If he scored the conversion, however, Stade would need a try. The kick from the right-hand touchline was from the most difficult position on the field for a right-footed kicker. Stimpson however hit the conversion straight between the posts, and Leicester were able to hang on to their lead for victory.

== Match details ==
19 May 2001
15:00 CEST

Stade Français (France)	30–34	(England) Leicester Tigers
Pen: Dominguez (9) 4', 16', 21', 27', 39', 46', 57', 68', 71'; Drop: Dominguez 77'	EPC Report; BBC Report	Try: Lloyd (2) 41' m, 79' c Back 59' c Con: Stimpson (2) 59', 79'; Pen: Stimpson (5) 6', 10', 30', 64', 73'

Parc des Princes, Paris
Attendance: 44,000
Referee: David McHugh (Ireland)

Stade Français	Leicester Tigers

FB	15	(France) Christophe Dominici
RW	14	(France) Thomas Lombard
OC	13	(France) Franck Comba
IC	12	(New Zealand) Cliff Mytton
LW	11	(France) Arthur Gomes
FH	10	(Italy) Diego Domínguez
SH	9	(Canada) Morgan Williams
N8	8	(France) Christophe Juillet
OF	7	(England) Richard Pool-Jones
BF	6	(France) Christophe Moni
RL	5	(Canada) Mike James
LL	4	(France) David Auradou
TP	3	(France) Pieter de Villiers
HK	2	(France) Fabrice Landreau	Temporarily suspended
LP	1	(France) Sylvain Marconnet
Replacements:
OC	16	(France) David Venditti
FL	17	(France) Patrick Tabacco
HK	18	(France) Mathieu Blin
N8	19	(Uruguay) Pablo Lemoine
LK	20	(New Zealand) Darren George
LP	21	(France) Julien Berthe
SH	22	(France) Christophe Laussucq
Coach:
(Australia) John Connolly

FB	15	(England) Tim Stimpson
RW	14	(Ireland) Geordan Murphy		(substituted off) 76'
OC	13	(England) Leon Lloyd
IC	12	(Australia) Pat Howard
LW	11	(Canada) Winston Stanley
FH	10	(England) Andy Goode		(substituted off) 72'
SH	9	(England) Austin Healey
N8	8	(England) Will Johnson		(substituted off) 36'
OF	7	(England) Neil Back
BF	6	(England) Martin Corry
RL	5	(England) Ben Kay
LL	4	(England) Martin Johnson (c)	Temporarily suspended
TP	3	(England) Darren Garforth
HK	2	(England) Dorian West
LP	1	(England) Graham Rowntree
Replacements:
OC	16	(South Africa) Glenn Gelderbloom		(substituted in) 76'
SH	17	(England) Jamie Hamilton		(substituted in) 72'
HK	18	(England) Richard Cockerill
LP	19	(England) Perry Freshwater
TP	20	(England) Ricky Nebbett
N8	21	(England) Paul Gustard		(substituted in) 36'
FL	22	(England) Lewis Moody
Coach:
(England) Dean Richards

== See also ==
- 2000–01 Heineken Cup
