= 2006–07 Premiership Rugby =

Rugby union competition in England

2006–07 Guinness Premiership
- Countries: England
- Champions: Leicester Tigers (7th title)
- Runners-up: Gloucester
- Relegated: Northampton Saints
- Matches played: 135
- Attendance: 1,598,734 (average 11,842 per match)

The 2006–07 Guinness Premiership was the 20th season of the top flight of the English domestic rugby union competitions, played between September 2006 and May 2007. It was announced during the 2005-06 season that the 2006-07 competition would end two weeks early due to the 2007 Rugby World Cup in France, as England would be defending their title. At the end of the previous season, Harlequins gained promotion to this season, while the Leeds Tykes were relegated. The Champions of this season were Leicester Tigers, beating Gloucester RFC 44–16 on 12 May in the Final at Twickenham, while the Northampton Saints were relegated. Leeds returned in 2007–08, under their new name of Leeds Carnegie, after being promoted.

From the start of the season, all half-time intervals were increased from the traditional 10 minutes to 15 minutes. The move has been explained as allowing clubs to capitalise on growing capacities and maximise refreshment income.

Two of the opening games of the season were played at Twickenham, in the 2006 London Double Header.

== Participating teams ==
Locations of the 2006-07 Guinness Premiership teams

Team	Stadium	Capacity	City/Area
Bath	Recreation Ground	10,600	Bath, Somerset
Bristol	Memorial Stadium (Note: Bristol would also play 2 home games at Ashton Gate in Bristol on 27 December 2006 and 24 April 2007)	11,916	Bristol
Gloucester	Kingsholm (Note: Gloucester would also play 1 home game at Ashton Gate in Bristol on 28 April 2007)	12,500	Gloucester, Gloucestershire
Harlequins	The Stoop	12,638 (Note: The Stoop capacity increased from 12,500 to 12,638 for the 2006–07 season.)	Twickenham, London
Leicester Tigers	Welford Road	16,815	Leicester, Leicestershire
London Irish	Madejski Stadium (Note: London Irish would also play 1 home game at Twickenham Stadium in London on 2 September 2006)	24,161	Reading, Berkshire
London Wasps	Adams Park	10,000	High Wycombe, Buckinghamshire
Newcastle Falcons	Kingston Park	10,200	Newcastle upon Tyne, Tyne and Wear
Northampton Saints	Franklin's Gardens	13,600	Northampton, Northamptonshire
Sale	Edgeley Park	10,852	Stockport, Greater Manchester
Saracens	Vicarage Road (Note: Saracens would also play 1 home game at Twickenham Stadium in London on 2 September 2006)	22,000	Watford, Hertfordshire
Worcester	Sixways	10,197	Worcester, Worcestershire

== Table ==
Pos	Team	Pld	W	D	L	PF	PA	PD	T	TB	LB	Pts
1	Gloucester (F)	22	15	2	5	531	404	+127	41	3	4	71
2	Leicester Tigers (C)	22	14	1	7	569	456	+113	37	9	5	71 (Note: Leicester were docked one point for fielding an ineligible player)
3	Bristol (SF)	22	14	1	7	398	394	+4	37	3	3	64
4	Saracens (SF)	22	12	2	8	539	399	+140	40	7	4	63
5	London Wasps	22	12	1	9	504	431	+73	41	5	6	61
6	London Irish	22	12	0	10	398	407	−9	42	3	2	53
7	Harlequins	22	10	0	12	503	438	+65	46	5	6	51
8	Bath	22	8	2	12	428	492	−64	50	2	7	45
9	Newcastle Falcons	22	9	0	13	435	528	−93	55	2	6	44
10	Sale Sharks	22	8	1	13	414	500	−86	44	2	6	42
11	Worcester Warriors	22	6	1	15	346	459	−113	50	0	9	35
12	Northampton Saints (R)	22	6	1	15	342	499	−157	52	1	6	33

Source: www.guinnesspremiership.com and BBC Sport: Updated 2007-04-28 --- Current English Leagues
Rules for classification: If teams are level at any stage, they are ranked by: 1. number of wins 2. league points 3. match points difference 4. match points for 5. head-to-head record.

== Results ==
=== Round 1 ===
2 September 2006
14:00

London Irish	20 – 19	NEC Harlequins

Twickenham
Attendance: 51,960

2 September 2006
15:00

Gloucester	24 – 19	Bath

Kingsholm
Attendance: 12,500

2 September 2006
15:00

Worcester Warriors	11 – 41	Bristol

Sixways
Attendance: 9,620

2 September 2006
16:20

Saracens	19 – 21	London Wasps

Twickenham
Attendance: 51,960

3 September 2006
13:45

Northampton Saints	25 – 23	Newcastle Falcons

Franklin’s Gardens
Attendance: 13,520

3 September 2006
16:00

Leicester Tigers	35 – 23	Sale Sharks

Welford Road
Attendance: 16,815

=== Round 2 ===
8 September 2006
19:45

London Wasps	23 – 17	London Irish

Adams Park
Attendance: 7,203

8 September 2006
20:00

Newcastle Falcons	20 – 19	Worcester Warriors

Kingston Park
Attendance: 6,654

9 September 2006
14:00

Sale Sharks	32 – 20	Northampton Saints

Edgeley Park
Attendance: 9,418

9 September 2006
14:15

Bath	43 – 25	Leicester Tigers

Recreation Ground
Attendance: 10,600

9 September 2006
15:00

NEC Harlequins	21 – 31	Gloucester

Twickenham Stoop
Attendance: 9,497

10 September 2006
15:00

Bristol	13 – 13	Saracens

Memorial Stadium
Attendance: 9,100

=== Round 3 ===
15 September 2006
20:00

Worcester Warriors	13 – 25	Sale Sharks

Sixways
Attendance: 9,432

16 September 2006
13:30

Northampton Saints	33 – 18	Bath

Franklin’s Gardens
Attendance: 13,186

16 September 2006
14:45

London Irish	11 – 23	Bristol

Madejski Stadium
Attendance: 7,650

16 September 2006
15:00

Leicester Tigers	27 – 27	Gloucester

Welford Road
Attendance: 16,815

17 September 2006
15:00

London Wasps	42 – 23	NEC Harlequins

Adams Park
Attendance: 7,340

17 September 2006
15:00

Saracens	44 – 20	Newcastle Falcons

Vicarage Road
Attendance: 7,213

=== Round 4 ===
22 September 2006
19:45

Sale Sharks	34 – 26	Saracens

Edgeley Park
Attendance: 9,537

22 September 2006
20:00

Newcastle Falcons	21 – 26	London Irish

Kingston Park
Attendance: 6,060

23 September 2006
14:15

Bath	17 – 11	Worcester Warriors

Recreation Ground
Attendance: 10,140

23 September 2006
15:00

Gloucester	28 – 7	Northampton Saints

Kingsholm
Attendance: 11,159

23 September 2006
18:15

NEC Harlequins	15 – 21	Leicester Tigers

Twickenham Stoop
Attendance: 10,164

24 September 2006
15:00

Bristol	26 – 21	London Wasps

Memorial Stadium
Attendance: 11,200

=== Round 5 ===
13 October 2006
20:00

Worcester Warriors	24 – 33	Gloucester

Sixways
Attendance: 10,197

14 October 2006
15:00

Northampton Saints	10 – 15	Leicester Tigers

Franklin’s Gardens
Attendance: 13,564

15 October 2006
14:00

London Wasps	35 – 15	Newcastle Falcons

Adams Park
Attendance: 7,440

15 October 2006
15:00

Bristol	33 – 20	NEC Harlequins

Memorial Stadium
Attendance: 10,136

15 October 2006
15:00

London Irish	14 – 31	Sale Sharks

Madejski Stadium
Attendance: 9,102

15 October 2006
15:00

Saracens	55 – 23	Bath

Vicarage Road
Attendance: 7,214

=== Round 6 ===
3 November 2006
19:45

Sale Sharks	18 – 12	London Wasps

Edgeley Park
Attendance: 10,417

3 November 2006
20:00

Newcastle Falcons	26 – 21	Bristol

Kingston Park
Attendance: 6,140

4 November 2006
14:15

Bath	17 – 21	London Irish

Recreation Ground
Attendance: 10,600

4 November 2006
15:00

Leicester Tigers	40 – 21	Worcester Warriors

Welford Road
Attendance: 16,766

4 November 2006
15:00

NEC Harlequins	34 – 19	Northampton Saints

Twickenham Stoop
Attendance: 11,354

4 November 2006
17:45

Gloucester	21 – 12	Saracens

Kingsholm
Attendance: 10,052

=== Round 7 ===
10 November 2006
19:45

Bristol	15 – 9	Sale Sharks

Memorial Stadium
Attendance: 10,753

10 November 2006
19:45

Newcastle Falcons	3 – 14	NEC Harlequins

Kingston Park
Attendance: 10,004

10 November 2006
20:00

London Irish	11 – 22	Gloucester

Madejski Stadium
Attendance: 9,880

11 November 2006
15:00

Worcester Warriors	18 – 23	Northampton Saints

Sixways
Attendance: 9,240

12 November 2006
15:00

London Wasps	47 – 18	Bath

Adams Park
Attendance: 7,309

12 November 2006
15:00

Saracens	22 – 16	Leicester Tigers

Vicarage Road
Attendance: 8,895

=== Round 8 ===
17 November 2006
19:45

NEC Harlequins	20 – 6	Worcester Warriors

Twickenham Stoop
Attendance: 9,833

17 November 2006
19:45

Sale Sharks	18 – 26	Newcastle Falcons

Edgeley Park
Attendance: 9,340

18 November 2006
13:00

Northampton Saints	13 – 35	Saracens

Franklin’s Gardens
Attendance: 13,356

18 November 2006
14:45

Leicester Tigers	26 – 18	London Irish

Welford Road
Attendance: 16,815

18 November 2006
15:00

Gloucester	27 – 21	London Wasps

Kingsholm
Attendance: 12,500

18 November 2006
17:30

Bath	12 – 19	Bristol

Recreation Ground
Attendance: 10,600

=== Round 9 ===
24 November 2006
19:45

Bristol	14 – 12	Gloucester

Memorial Stadium
Attendance: 11,916

24 November 2006
19:45

Sale Sharks	17 – 12	NEC Harlequins

Edgeley Park
Attendance: 8,616

25 November 2006
12:30

Bath	20 – 14	Newcastle Falcons

Recreation Ground
Attendance: 10,600

26 November 2006
14:00

Saracens	17 – 20	Worcester Warriors

Vicarage Road
Attendance: 5,027

26 November 2006
15:00

London Irish	40 – 5	Northampton Saints

Madejski Stadium
Attendance: 7,400

26 November 2006
15:00

London Wasps	13 – 19	Leicester Tigers

Adams Park
Attendance: 9,500

=== Round 10 ===
22 December 2006
19:45

Bath	18 – 16	Sale Sharks

Recreation Ground
Attendance: 10,300

22 December 2006
19:45

Leicester Tigers	43 – 15	Bristol

Welford Road
Attendance: 16,815

22 December 2006
19:45

NEC Harlequins	16 – 20	Saracens

Twickenham Stoop
Attendance: 10,103

22 December 2006
20:00

Northampton Saints	8 – 6	London Wasps

Franklin’s Gardens
Attendance: 13,484

22 December 2006
20:00

Worcester Warriors	14 – 16	London Irish

Sixways
Attendance: 9,382

=== Round 11 ===
26 December 2006
15:00

London Irish	26 – 25	Leicester Tigers

Madejski Stadium
Attendance: 13,380

26 December 2006
15:00

London Wasps	33 – 12	Gloucester

Adams Park
Attendance: 10,000

26 December 2006
15:00

Newcastle Falcons	40 – 25	Sale Sharks

Kingston Park
Attendance: 8,574

27 December 2006
17:15

Bristol	16 – 6	Bath

Ashton Gate
Attendance: 21,203

27 December 2006
19:45

Saracens	38 – 15	Northampton Saints

Vicarage Road
Attendance: 12,082

27 December 2006
20:00

Worcester Warriors	20 – 27	NEC Harlequins

Sixways
Attendance: 10,797

=== Round 12 ===
1 January 2007
14:45

Leicester Tigers	28 – 15	Saracens

Welford Road
Attendance: 16,815

1 January 2007
15:00

Bath	30 – 19	London Wasps

Recreation Ground
Attendance: 10,600

1 January 2007
15:00

Gloucester	15 – 3	London Irish

Kingsholm
Attendance: 12,500

1 January 2007
15:00

NEC Harlequins	42 – 15	Newcastle Falcons

Twickenham Stoop
Attendance: 10,837

1 January 2007
15:00

Northampton Saints	9 – 10	Worcester Warriors

Franklin’s Gardens
Attendance: 13,423

1 January 2007
15:00

Sale Sharks	6 – 10	Bristol

Edgeley Park
Attendance: 9,422

=== Round 13 ===
6 January 2007
15:00

NEC Harlequins	9 – 3	Bath

Twickenham Stoop
Attendance: 10,920

6 January 2007
17:45

Sale Sharks	20 – 19	Gloucester

Edgeley Park
Attendance: 8,377

7 January 2007
15:00

London Wasps	19 – 14	Worcester Warriors

Adams Park
Attendance: 7,224

7 January 2007
15:00

Newcastle Falcons	31 – 29	Leicester Tigers

Kingston Park
Attendance: 7,565

=== Round 14 ===
26 January 2007
20:00

Worcester Warriors	3 – 3	London Wasps

Sixways
Attendance: 9,110

27 January 2007
14:15

Bath	31 – 23	NEC Harlequins

Recreation Ground
Attendance: 10,600

27 January 2007
15:00

Gloucester	44 – 24	Sale Sharks

Kingsholm
Attendance: 12,058

27 January 2007
15:00

Leicester Tigers	39 – 5	Newcastle Falcons

Welford Road
Attendance: 16,815

27 January 2007
17:45

Northampton Saints	8 – 14	Bristol

Franklin’s Gardens
Attendance: 12,876

28 January 2007
13:30

Saracens	19 – 8	London Irish

Vicarage Road
Attendance: 8,492

=== Round 15 ===
17 February 2007
14:45

Worcester Warriors	6 – 13	Leicester Tigers

Sixways
Attendance: 9,623

17 February 2007
15:00

London Irish	15 – 7	Bath

Madejski Stadium
Attendance: 11,480

17 February 2007
15:00

Northampton Saints	15 – 28	NEC Harlequins

Franklin’s Gardens
Attendance: 13,466

18 February 2007
13:30

London Wasps	26 – 18	Sale Sharks

Adams Park
Attendance: 8,599

18 February 2007
15:00

Bristol	22 – 21	Newcastle Falcons

Memorial Stadium
Attendance: 11,601

18 February 2007
15:00

Saracens	24 – 22	Gloucester

Vicarage Road
Attendance: 8,452

=== Round 16 ===
23 February 2007
19:45

Sale Sharks	9 – 14	London Irish

Edgeley Park
Attendance: 9,275

23 February 2007
20:00

Newcastle Falcons	37 – 11	London Wasps

Kingston Park
Attendance: 9,665

24 February 2007
13:00

Leicester Tigers	9 – 10	Northampton Saints

Welford Road
Attendance: 16,815

24 February 2007
14:15

Bath	20 – 20	Saracens

Recreation Ground
Attendance: 10,600

24 February 2007
15:00

Gloucester	33 – 19	Worcester Warriors

Kingsholm
Attendance: 12,500

24 February 2007
15:00

NEC Harlequins	15 – 8	Bristol

Twickenham Stoop
Attendance: 11,316

=== Round 17 ===
3 March 2007
15:00

London Irish	38 – 12	Newcastle Falcons

Madejski Stadium
Attendance: 10,003

3 March 2007
15:00

Northampton Saints	5 – 7	Gloucester

Franklin’s Gardens
Attendance: 13,529

3 March 2007
15:00

Worcester Warriors	21 – 15	Bath

Sixways
Attendance: 9,344

3 March 2007
17:15

Leicester Tigers	27 – 22	NEC Harlequins

Welford Road
Attendance: 16,815

4 March 2007
15:00

London Wasps	28 – 0	Bristol

Adams Park
Attendance: 8,393

4 March 2007
15:00

Saracens	22 – 9	Sale Sharks

Vicarage Road
Attendance: 8,333

=== Round 18 ===
9 March 2007
19:45

Sale Sharks	12 – 18	Worcester Warriors

Edgeley Park
Attendance: 8,376

9 March 2007
20:00

Newcastle Falcons	20 – 14	Saracens

Kingston Park
Attendance: 6,368

10 March 2007
14:15

Bath	22 – 17	Northampton Saints

Recreation Ground
Attendance: 10,600

10 March 2007
15:00

Bristol	7 – 12	London Irish

Memorial Stadium
Attendance: 8,593

10 March 2007
15:00

NEC Harlequins	16 – 23	London Wasps

Twickenham Stoop
Attendance: 12,700

11 March 2007
13:00

Gloucester	28 – 24	Leicester Tigers

Kingsholm
Attendance: 12,000

=== Round 19 ===
16 March 2007
20:00

Worcester Warriors	23 – 21	Newcastle Falcons

Sixways
Attendance: 9,827

17 March 2007
14:45

Leicester Tigers	29 – 25	Bath

Welford Road
Attendance: 16,815

17 March 2007
15:00

Gloucester	34 – 25	NEC Harlequins

Kingsholm
Attendance: 10,391

17 March 2007
15:00

Northampton Saints	18 – 18	Sale Sharks

Franklin’s Gardens
Attendance: 13,265

18 March 2007
14:00

London Irish	16 – 13	London Wasps

Madejski Stadium
Attendance: 22,648

18 March 2007
15:00

Saracens	36 – 5	Bristol

Vicarage Road
Attendance: 7,737

=== Rearranged fixtures ===
23 March 2007
20:00

London Irish	7 – 22	Saracens

Madejski Stadium
Attendance: 8,738

24 March 2007
16:30

Gloucester	24 – 18	Newcastle Falcons

Kingsholm
Attendance: 12,500

25 March 2007
15:00

Bristol	31 – 19	Northampton Saints

Memorial Stadium
Attendance: 9,553

=== Round 20 ===
6 April 2007
19:45

Sale Sharks	25 – 26	Leicester Tigers

Edgeley Park
Attendance: 10,037

7 April 2007
14:15

Bath	21 – 21	Gloucester

Recreation Ground
Attendance: 10,600

7 April 2007
14:45

Bristol	22 – 17	Worcester Warriors

Memorial Stadium
Attendance: 8,516

7 April 2007
15:00

NEC Harlequins	34 – 17	London Irish

Twickenham Stoop
Attendance: 12,600

8 April 2007
15:00

London Wasps	27 – 26	Saracens

Adams Park
Attendance: 10,000

8 April 2007
15:00

Newcastle Falcons	16 – 7	Northampton Saints

Kingston Park
Attendance: 10,200

=== Round 21 ===
13 April 2007
19:45

Sale Sharks	25 – 23	Bath

Edgeley Park
Attendance: 10,641

13 April 2007
20:00

Newcastle Falcons	19 – 12	Gloucester

Kingston Park
Attendance: 7,016

15 April 2007
12:15

London Wasps	35 – 29	Northampton Saints

Adams Park
Attendance: 8,053

15 April 2007
15:00

London Irish	26 – 16	Worcester Warriors

Madejski Stadium
Attendance: 10,862

15 April 2007
15:00

Saracens	33 – 19	NEC Harlequins

Vicarage Road
Attendance: 12,553

24 April 2007
19:45

Bristol	30 – 13	Leicester Tigers

Ashton Gate
Attendance: 12,495

=== Round 22 ===
28 April 2007
15:05

Gloucester	35 – 13	Bristol

Ashton Gate
Attendance: 15,852

28 April 2007
15:05

Leicester Tigers	40 – 26	London Wasps

Welford Road
Attendance: 17,418

28 April 2007
15:05

NEC Harlequins	49 – 0	Sale Sharks

Twickenham Stoop
Attendance: 12,680

28 April 2007
15:05

Newcastle Falcons	12 – 20	Bath

Kingston Park
Attendance: 9,118

28 April 2007
15:05

Northampton Saints	27 – 22	London Irish

Franklin’s Gardens
Attendance: 13,538

28 April 2007
15:05

Worcester Warriors	22 – 7	Saracens

Sixways
Attendance: 10,197

== Play-offs ==
=== Semi-finals ===
5 May 2007
13:00

Gloucester	50 – 9	Saracens

Kingsholm
Attendance: 9,300

5 May 2007
17:30

Leicester Tigers	26 – 14	Bristol

Welford Road
Attendance: 10,675

=== Final ===
12 May 2007
14:30

Gloucester	16–44	Leicester Tigers
Tries: Lamb c Conv: Walker 1/1; Pens:Walker 3	Report 1 Report 2	Tries: F.Murphy, 2 Tuilagi, Corry, Goode, Jennings, Moody; Conv: Goode 3/7; Pens: Goode

Twickenham
Attendance: 59,400
Referee: Dave Pearson

Team details

Gloucester
Leicester Tigers

FB	15	(New Zealand) Willie Walker
RW	14	(England) Iain Balshaw
OC	13	(England) James Simpson-Daniel
IC	12	(England) Anthony Allen
LW	11	(England) Mark Foster
FH	10	(England) Ryan Lamb
SH	9	(England) Peter Richards	(substituted off) 53'
N8	8	(England) Luke Narraway
OF	7	(England) Andy Hazell
BF	6	(England) Peter Buxton (c)	(substituted off) 15'
RL	5	(England) Alex Brown
LL	4	(Wales) Will James	(substituted off) 78'
TP	3	(Italy) Carlos Nieto
HK	2	(France) Olivier Azam	(substituted off) 48'
LP	1	(England) Nick Wood	(substituted off) 54'
Replacements:
HK	16	(Wales) Mefin Davies	(substituted in) 48'
PR	17	(France) Christian Califano	(substituted in) 54'
LK	18	(England) Adam Eustace	(substituted in) 78'
FL	19	(South Africa) Jake Boer	(substituted in) 15'
SH	20	(Scotland) Rory Lawson	(substituted in) 53'
CE	21	(England) Jake Adams
FB	22	(England) Jon Goodridge
	Coach: (England) Dean Ryan

FB	15	(Ireland) Geordan Murphy
RW	14	(Fiji) Seru Rabeni	(substituted off) 62'
OC	13	(England) Dan Hipkiss
IC	12	(England) Ollie Smith	(substituted off) 57'
LW	11	(Samoa) Alesana Tuilagi
FH	10	(England) Andy Goode
SH	9	(Ireland) Frank Murphy	(substituted off) 67'
N8	8	(England) Martin Corry (c)
OF	7	(Ireland) Shane Jennings	(substituted off) 70'
BF	6	(England) Lewis Moody
RL	5	(England) Ben Kay
LL	4	(England) Louis Deacon	(substituted off) 56'
TP	3	(England) Julian White	(substituted off) 67'
HK	2	(England) George Chuter	(substituted off) 70'
LP	1	(Argentina) Marcos Ayerza
Replacements:
HK	16	(England) James Buckland	(substituted in) 70'
PR	17	(Italy) Alex Moreno	(substituted in) 67'
LK	18	(Ireland) Leo Cullen	(substituted in) 56'
FL	19	(England) Brett Deacon	(substituted in) 70'
SH	20	(England) Ben Youngs	(substituted in) 67'
FH	21	(England) Sam Vesty	(substituted in) 57'
CE	22	(England) Tom Varndell	(substituted in) 62'
	Coach: (Australia) Pat Howard

== Individual statistics ==
Note: Flags to the left of player names indicate national team as has been defined under World Rugby eligibility rules, or primary nationality for players who did not earn international senior caps. Players may hold one or more non-WR nationalities.

=== Most points ===
Rank	Player	Club	Points
1	(New Zealand) Glen Jackson	Saracens	281
2	(England) Olly Barkley	Bath	185
2	(New Zealand) Willie Walker	Gloucester	185
4	(England) Adrian Jarvis	Harlequins	181
5	(England) Andy Goode	Leicester Tigers	174
6	(Australia) Shane Drahm	Worcester Warriors	156
7	(England) Toby Flood	Newcastle Falcons	89
8	(England) Ryan Lamb	Gloucester	87
9	(Ireland) Ian Humphreys	Leicester Tigers	84
9	(England) Mark van Gisbergen	London Wasps	84

=== Most tries ===
Rank	Player	Club	Tries
1	(Samoa) David Lemi	Bristol	11
2	(England) Mike Brown	Harlequins	9
2	(England) Tom Varndell	Leicester Tigers	9
4	(England) Topsy Ojo	London Irish	8
4	(New Zealand) Mark Robinson	Northampton Saints	8
4	(England) Paul Sackey	London Wasps	8
4	(England) David Strettle	Harlequins	8
4	(Samoa) Alesana Tuilagi	Leicester Tigers	8
9	(Fiji) Kameli Ratuvou	Saracens	7
10	6 players tied		6
