= Martin Corry (rugby union) =

British Lions & England international rugby union player

Martin Corry MBE
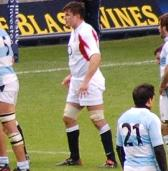
- Corry in 2008
- Born: Martin Edward Corry; 12 October 1973 (age 53) Birmingham, England
- Height: 6 ft 5 in (1.95 m)
- Weight: 17 st 9 lb (112 kg)
- School: Tunbridge Wells Grammar School for Boys
- University: Northumbria University

Rugby union career
- Position(s): Number eight, Flanker, Lock
Amateur team(s)
Years	Team	Apps	(Points)
–1993	Tunbridge Wells		
Senior career
Years	Team	Apps	(Points)
1993–1995	Newcastle Gosforth		
1995–1997	Bristol	32	(40)
1997–2009	Leicester Tigers	290	(135)
1998–2009	Barbarians	5	(5)
International career
Years	Team	Apps	(Points)
1994	England U21		
1997–2007	England	64	(30)
2001, 2005	British & Irish Lions	7	(0)

Martin Edward Corry MBE (born 12 October 1973) is a retired English rugby union player who represented and captained England and Leicester Tigers in a career spanning 14 seasons. Corry played 64 times for England between 1997 and 2007, played 7 tests for the British & Irish Lions on tours in 2001 & 2005, and played 290 times for Leicester between 1997 and 2009. Earlier in his career he played top division rugby for Newcastle Gosforth and Bristol. A versatile player his principal positions were number eight and blindside flanker, he also played lock more as his career progressed.

Corry started the 2007 Rugby World Cup Final, and was an unused substitute as England won the 2003 Rugby World Cup Final. He was a Premiership Rugby champion six times (1999, 2000, 2001, 2002, 2007 & 2009) and European Champion twice in 2001 and 2002.

== Early life ==
Born in Birmingham, Corry was educated at Tunbridge Wells Grammar School, and first played rugby union for Tunbridge Wells minis.

== Career ==
=== University, Newcastle and England under 21s ===
Corry attended the University of Northumbria, impressing for their rugby team, before being named as a reserve for a Courage League game for Newcastle Gosforth against Bath. By April 1994, Corry had been called up for England under 21s and was described in the press as a "flanker of rare talent", in October 1994, Corry was named as England under 21's captain. Corry captained the under 21s to a victory over New Zealand Youth, and also captained Northumbria University to a British Universities championship. Following Newcastle's failure to gain promotion in the 1994–95 Courage League National Division Two season, Corry was one of a number of leading players who moved on, in his case joining Bristol.

=== England debut, Leicester title win and 1999 Rugby World Cup ===
In 1995, Corry joined Bristol. In February 1997 he was named as part of a 62 man long-list for the 1997 British Lions tour to South Africa, one of three uncapped players at that stage, but was not in the final squad, instead he made his England debut in May 1997 against Argentina.

Corry moved to Leicester Tigers in the summer of 1997, despite having one year remaining on his Bristol contract, which prompted legal threats from Bristol.

Corry made his Leicester debut on 30 August 1997 against Gloucester at Welford Road, and despite being sent off in a 15 all draw against Northampton Saints played 27 times across number 8, flanker and lock in his first season. The following season saw Corry establish himself as Tigers first choice number 8, starting 29 times in the season; Corry made amends for his red card the previous season as he scored a crucial try in a 1st v 2nd match against Northampton, the 22–15 win effectively sealed the first of Leicester's four successive Premiership Rugby titles.

After selection for the 1999 Rugby World Cup, Corry returned to Leicester on 30 October 1999 scoring a try against Bedford Blues in a 61–12 win. Corry was then an ever present as Tigers lost only 1 game in 16 to retain the Premiership Rugby title, he also captained the side for the first time in a European game against Leinster.

=== European titles and first Lions tour ===
2000–01 season saw Corry again be a regular member of Leicester pack, switching between flanker and number 8 with Will Johnson, he played 30 times as Tigers retained the Premiership Rugby title for a third straight year. This season, Tigers also progressed in Europe; Corry started as Leicester beat Swansea in the quarter-finals and Gloucester in semis, Corry started the 2001 Heineken Cup Final at blindside flanker as Leicester beat Stade Français Paris 34–30.

In 2001, Corry was called up to the British and Irish Lions side after the tour had started, due to injuries within the squad, and immediately impressed Graham Henry, the Lions coach. He started the first test in the absence of the injured Neil Back, and replaced the injured Richard Hill in the second before starting the third test in the absence of Hill. He played in the delayed Six Nations decider in Dublin in October 2001 for England.

Corry missed much of the first half of the 2001–02 season with injury and international call ups but returned in December to be an ever-present until Leicester secured their fourth straight Premiership Rugby title on 13 April 2002 against Newcastle Falcons at Welford Road. Corry started the 2002 Heineken Cup Final where Leicester beat Munster, they were the first side to retain the European trophy.

=== 2003 Rugby World Cup, England captaincy and second Lions tour ===
Corry confirmed his selection for Clive Woodward's Rugby World Cup squad in a highly competitive back row area with a strong late run in England's warm-up matches: he performed well in the 43–9 defeat of Wales at the Millennium Stadium in late Summer of 2003 and then again in the September defeat of France at Twickenham. He was part of England's 2003 World Cup-winning squad, chosen ahead of teammate Graham Rowntree. During the 2003 Rugby World Cup, Corry flew home from Australia for the birth of his first child, daughter Eve. He rejoined the squad days later, and played in England's victory over Uruguay. He was an unused replacement in the 2003 Rugby World Cup Final.

In 2005, Corry was named as England Captain for the Six Nations match against Italy and Scotland, in the absence of Jason Robinson. Leicester reached the semi-finals of the 2004-05 Heineken Cup, but Corry missed the semi-final defeat by Toulouse due to suspension following a red card against Saracens. However, in May 2005 he was named as both the player of the 2004-05 Premiership Rugby season at the end of year awards, and the players' player of the season. Despite the individual accolades Leicester were to come up short losing the Premiership final to Wasps.

In the summer, Corry was selected for his second Lions tour, this time to New Zealand, and was made vice-captain for the first test. He went on to captain the team from the 2nd minute onwards as Brian O'Driscoll was injured in a notorious spear tackle incident. However, he was dropped for the final two tests in favour of Ryan Jones.

=== Leicester captain ===
Corry was named as Leicester's new club captain in August 2005, taking over after the retirement of Martin Johnson. Following his selection on the 2005 Lions tour Corry returned ahead of schedule to captain the club in the first match of the season, playing 48 minutes in a 32–0 win over Northampton. He was again selected as England's captain for the 2005 autumn internationals and 2006 Six Nations tournament. Corry played 24 times for Leicester that season as they reached a European quarter-final, and an Anglo-Welsh semi-final, before losing to the Sale Sharks in the 2006 Premiership final.

Tigers gained some revenge for that loss in the opening game of the 2006-07 Premiership Rugby season, Corry particularly impressing and scoring in a 35–23 win against Sale. He continued as England captain for the 2006 Autumn Internationals, in which England lost to New Zealand, Argentina and South Africa. Following these results, England Head coach Andy Robinson left his post and was replaced by Brian Ashton. In his first squad selection as England coach, Ashton named Corry in the starting line-up for the 2007 Six Nations opener against Scotland, though he was replaced as captain by Phil Vickery. Corry remained in the side as the tournament progressed, but in the final two games of the tournament (against France and Wales) he was moved to lock.

Corry captained Leicester in the 2007 Anglo-Welsh Cup Final, a 41–35 win that ended a 5-year trophy drought for the club. A week later Corry was selected as Man of the match when Leicester beat the Scarlets 33–17 in the 2007 Heineken Cup semi-final. Corry won his fifth Premiership medal, starting the final and scoring a try as Leicester defeated Gloucester to secure the domestic double. They could not make it a treble though, losing the 2007 Heineken Cup Final to Wasps, 25–9.

=== 2007 Rugby World Cup and final seasons ===
In 2007, Corry formed part of the Ashton's Rugby World Cup squad in which England progressed to the Final in Paris but were ultimately unable to defend their world title, losing to South Africa. The following year, Corry reportedly turned down Ashton's offer of a place in the England's squad for the opening fixture of their 2008 Six Nations campaign, instead announcing his retirement from international rugby at the age of 34. This move was made in order that he could focus on his remaining club career with Leicester tigers.

Following the 2007 Rugby World Cup, Corry returned to Leicester as captain. His regular position switched to blindside flanker to accommodate Jordan Crane who had come into the side in Corry's absence. Corry started the 2008 Anglo-Welsh Cup Final, which ended in defeat to the Ospreys, and the 2008 Premiership final, where Wasps were once again winners in a Twickenham showpiece final. In April 2008, Corry signed a one-year contract extension with Leicester.

Corry's final season saw him play mainly at lock, Tom Croft had developed and was now first choice blindside flanker. His final game for Leicester was on 24 January 2009, in a European Cup match against the Ospreys. He announced his retirement at the end of the 2008–2009 season. Following Leicester's victory in the 2009 Premiership Rugby Final Corry was on hand to lift the trophy, despite not playing, and the following week he captained the Barbarians against England at Twickenham, to a 33–26 victory in his final match of his professional career.

== Personal life ==
Corry flew back from Australia during the 2003 World Cup for the birth of his first child. He re-joined the squad just a few days later. His son Edward was born soon after the end of the 2006 Six Nations Championship and a daughter was born in 2009. Corry returned to Tunbridge Wells to play a charity match, aged 50, with his son in 2023.

== Sources ==
- Farmer, Stuart; Hands, David (2014). Tigers - Official history of Leicester Football Club. The Rugby Development Foundation. ISBN 978-0-9930213-0-5.

Sporting positions
Preceded by Jason Robinson; Pat Sanderson; Phil Vickery	England national rugby union team captain Mar 2005 – Mar 2006; Nov 2006; Sep 2007	Succeeded by Pat Sanderson; Phil Vickery; Phil Vickery
Preceded by Brian O'Driscoll; Tour captain O'Driscoll injured as active captain	British and Irish Lions captain O'Driscoll; Remained tour captain Jun 2005; As active captain	Succeeded by Brian O'Driscoll; Tour captain Gareth Thomas as active captain
