= Andy Long (rugby union) =

England international rugby union player

- Born: Andrew Edward Long; 2 September 1977 (age 49) Poole, Dorset, England
- Height: 1.80 m (5 ft 11 in)
- Weight: 105 kg (16 st 7 lb)
- School: St Peter's Catholic School

Rugby union career
- Position: Hooker
Youth career
- -: Bournemouth RFC
Senior career
Years	Team	Apps	(Points)
1997-2003	Bath Rugby	81	(20)
2003	Munster		
2003-2004	Rotherham Titans	10	(5)
2004-2009	Newcastle Falcons	84	(15)
2009-2010	CR El Salvador		
2010-2012	Northampton Saints	26	(5)
International career
Years	Team	Apps	(Points)
- England Saxons
1997-2001	England	2	

Andy Long (born 2 September 1977) is a former English rugby union player who played at Hooker. He has 2 caps for England.

Originally a product of Bournemouth and the Bath academy, where he came to the attention of Bath coach Clive Woodward, having captained England U19s and U21s. Woodward was appointed England coach in 1997 and picked the 20-year-old on potential for his first match in charge against Australia. However, Long was replaced at half-time by Richard Cockerill, who then started the subsequent matches against New Zealand with Long on the bench. Long, however, did not again enter the field of play. He thus seemed destined to become a "one cap wonder" until gaining a second cap against the United States in 2001 when most of the regular England players were away with the 2001 British Lions tour to Australia. He also played for England in a non cap international against The Barbarians in 2003.

Meanwhile, Long spent 7 years at Bath, before joining Irish province Munster during the 2003 World Cup, after which he returned to England with Rotherham, who were relegated in 2004 and he travelled further north to join Newcastle Falcons.

He was called into the England Saxons squad to face Italy A in Ragusa, Sicily on 9 February 2008.

On 20 November 2009, he signed for Northampton Saints and made his debut for the first team against Sale Sharks in the LV cup which they won 20–14.

For the 2011/12 season he joined Cambridge RUFC as forwards coach .

On 31 May 2012, he was forced to retire from rugby, due to the effects of a degenerative neck injury.

For the 2013/14/15 seasons he is the head coach at Bishop's Stortford RFC.
