= Richard Cockerill =

England international rugby union player

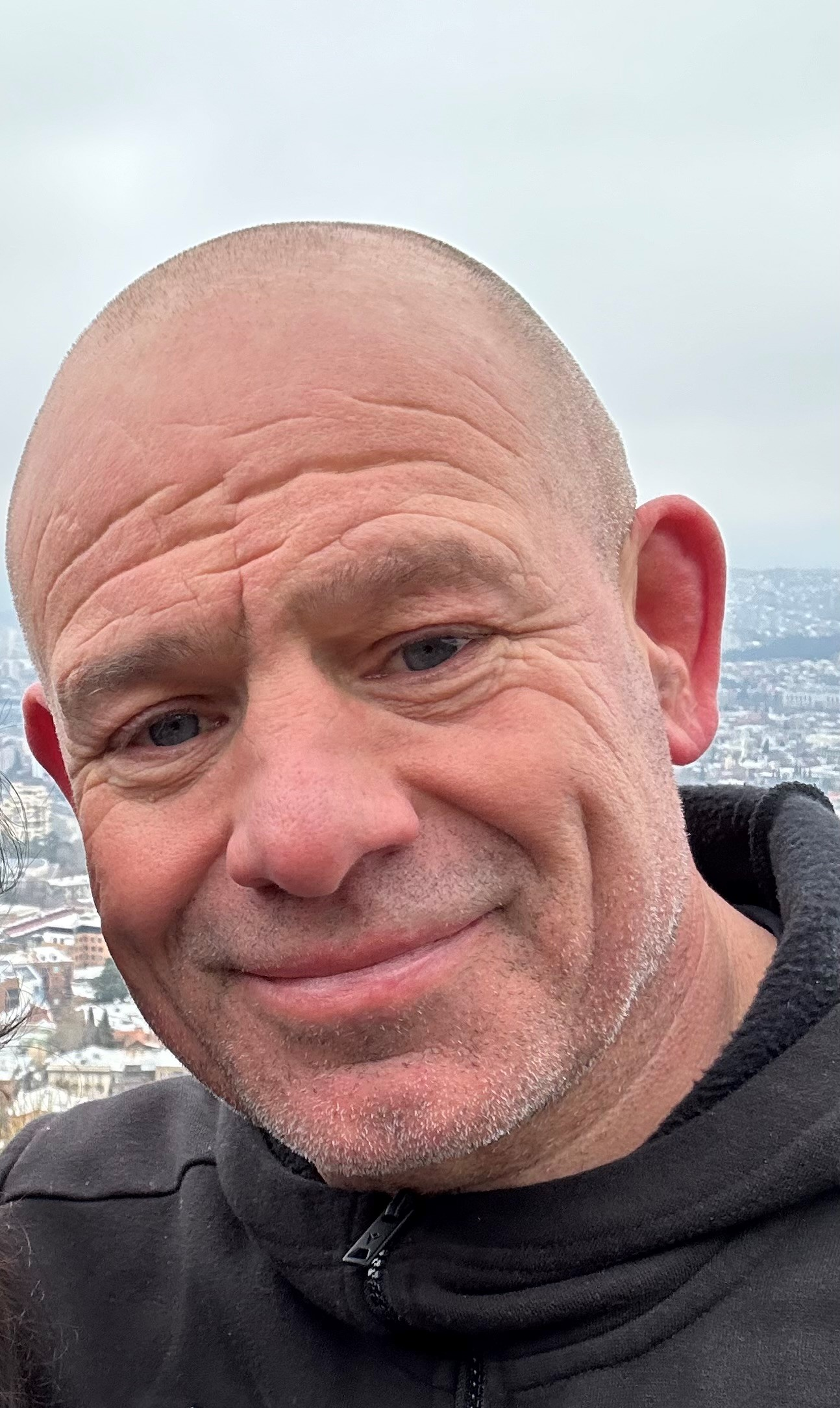
- Cockerill in 2024
- Born: Richard Cockerill; 16 December 1970 (age 55) Rugby, Warwickshire
- Height: 1.78 m (5 ft 10 in)
- Weight: 107 kg (16 st 12 lb)
- School: Harris School

Rugby union career
- Position: Hooker
Amateur team(s)
Years	Team	Apps	(Points)
1987–1991	Newbold on Avon		
Senior career
Years	Team	Apps	(Points)
1991–1992	Coventry	12	(0)
1992–2002	Leicester Tigers	250	(70)
2002–2004	Montferrand	31	(5)
2004–2005	Leicester Tigers	5	(0)
1991–2005	Total	298	(75)
International career
Years	Team	Apps	(Points)
1995–1997	England A	?	(?)
1997–1999	England	27	(15)
Coaching career
- Years: Team
- 2005–2009: Leicester Tigers (Forwards Coach)
- 2009–2017: Leicester Tigers (Director of Rugby)
- 2017: Toulon (Head Coach)
- 2017–2021: Edinburgh (Head Coach)
- 2021–2023: England (Forwards Coach)
- 2022: England (Interim Coach)
- 2023: Montpellier
- 2024–2025: Georgia
- 2024–2025: Black Lion

Richard Cockerill (born 16 December 1970) is an English rugby union coach and former player and was last the Head Coach of the Georgian National Rugby Team.

Prior to this he was the manager of Top 14 side Montpellier and was also the England national team's interim head coach between Eddie Jones and Steve Borthwick. He played as a hooker, spending the majority of his career at Leicester Tigers where he played 255 games over two spells, he won 27 caps for England and was included in the 1999 Rugby World Cup squad. He won five league titles, two European Cups and two domestic cups as a player.

Following his retirement from playing in 2005, Cockerill commences his coaching journey leading to success in England in Scotland.

== Playing career ==
Cockerill was born in Rugby, Warwickshire, and began his rugby journey with Newbold-on-Avon RFC before moving to Coventry in 1991.

In 1992, he joined Leicester Tigers, and established himself as the "B" of the "ABC club" alongside Graham Rowntree (A) and Darren Garforth (C). Whilst at Leicester he helped the side to seven English Premiership finals, lifting the trophy in 1996, 1999, 2000, 2001, and 2002.

Cockerill was an unused replacement for both the 2001 and 2002 Heineken Cup winning finals.

He made his England debut against Argentina in 1997 and later his first match at Twickenham was as a half-time replacement for the Bath hooker Andy Long in Clive Woodward's first match in charge against the Wallabies. Cockerill's performance earned him a starting place against New Zealand, where he stood up to Norm Hewitt during the haka (see book cover).

A dip in form led him to lose his first choice hooking position at Leicester to Dorian West and was also dropped from the England side after criticising Woodward in his book entitled In Your Face. He subsequently moved to France, to play for Montferrand (now known as ASM Clermont Auvergne) but re-signed again for Leicester for the 2004–05 season.

Cockerill retired in 2005 with nine bits of silverware under his belt at domestic and European level.

== Coaching career ==
=== Leicester Tigers ===
Cockerill's first coaching stint came in 2005 when he was appointed forwards coach at Leicester Tigers succeeding John Wells. In his first two season, Leicester returned to the final for the first time since 2002, and in both seasons, they fell short in the final to finish as runners-up. However, in 2007, for the third year in a row, Leicester made the final and lifted the trophy.

Following the 2007 season, Pat Howard left his role as head coach and Leicester appointed the then Argentine head coach Marcelo Loffreda as their new head coach. However, the 2007/08 season launch clashed with the 2007 Rugby World Cup and therefore Cockerill served as acting head coach before Loffreda arrived from Argentina.

He also took over as acting head coach in February 2009 after Heyneke Meyer resigned due to family reasons and on 17 April 2009, and Cockerill was later confirmed in the head coach role.

During his time in charge of Leicester, he led his side to six consecutive Premiership finals, of which three of them were trophy winning finals; In 2009, 2010, 2013. He also led the side into the 2009 Heineken Cup Final, before going on to lose to Leinster 19–16 in Edinburgh.

In December 2016, it was announced that Cockerill was to be fired from his position if he did not 'turn a corner' and subsequent defeats against various teams along with the players themselves asking for a change, led to Cockerill being sacked in January 2017.

=== Post Leicester Tigers ===
After leaving Leicester he joined Toulon in 2017 on a temporary basis but succeeded in taking them to the final of the 2016-17 Top 14 season where they lost to Clermont.

In 2017 he was named as the head coach of Guinness Pro14 side Edinburgh Rugby, where he led them to the Pro 14 playoffs for the first time, losing to Munster in the Quarter-finals.

He extended his contract in April 2018 to remain as head coach with Edinburgh until 2021, and during the 2018–19 season, led Edinburgh to top their group in the European Rugby Champions Cup, however, later lose to Munster in the quarter-finals.

A year later, he led Edinburgh to the 2019–20 Pro14 semi-finals, but again fell short and lost to Ulster 22–19.

He left Edinburgh when his contract expired in 2021 and was appointed to Eddie Jones' England coaching staff as forwards coach.

After Eddie Jones was fired from his England post in December 2022, Cockerill was appointed interim England coach until Steve Borthwick joined up with the squad in January 2023. Following the 2023 Six Nations Championship, Cockerill then left his post with the RFU, and became forwards coach at Montpellier.

Following a poor 22/23 season, Cockerill was promoted to head coach in the summer of 2023 replacing Philippe Saint-André. However, Montpellier continued to have poor results, and in November 2023, he was sacked by the club after just seven games.

=== Head coach of Georgia ===
In January 2024, Cockerill was name the new head coach of the Georgian national team

In his first campaign in charge he led Georgia to the 2024 Rugby Europe Championship title, their seventh consecutive title. He also led the Lelos on their Pacific tour during the 2024 July test window, earning a first win over Japan since 2014. In November 2024, Georgia gained just one win, coming against Tonga, however did push Italy in Genoa, losing 20–17.

Cockerill also led the Black Lion side during the 2024–25 EPCR Challenge Cup, finishing bottom of their pool, with just a sole victory over Vannes.

In March 2025, Georgia retained their 2025 Rugby Europe Championship title, to see Georgia qualify for the 2027 Rugby World Cup as Europe 1.

== Bibliography ==
- Richard Cockerill (with Michael Tanner as a ghost writer) In Your Face: A Rugby Odyssey ISBN 1-84018-266-0

Preceded by (Georgia (country)) Levan Maisashvili	Georgian national rugby coach 2024-2025	Succeeded by (Italy) Marco Bortolami (Caretaker)
