= Geordan Murphy =

Irish rugby union player

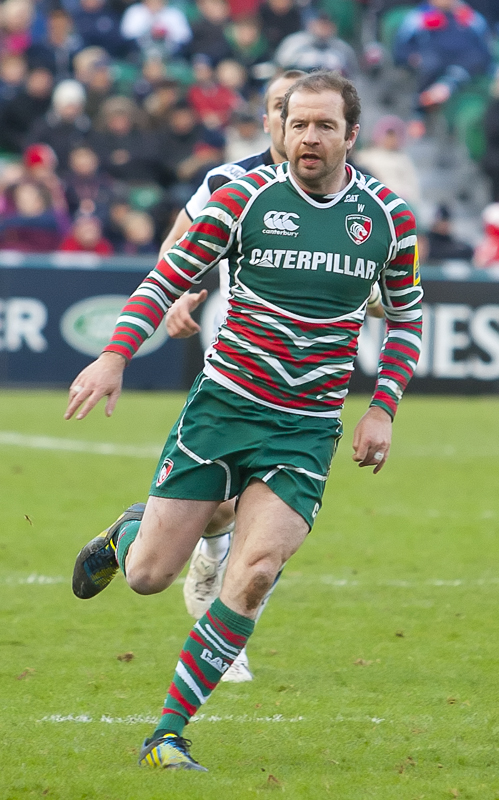
- Geordan Murphy playing at fullback for Leicester against Bath.
- Born: Geordan Edward Andrew Murphy; 19 April 1978 (age 48) Dublin, Ireland
- Height: 1.85 m (6 ft 1 in)
- Weight: 87 kg (13 st 10 lb; 192 lb)
- School: Newbridge College
- University: De Montfort University; Waterford Institute of Technology

Rugby union career
- Position(s): Fullback, Wing
Senior career
Years	Team	Apps	(Points)
1997–2013	Leicester Tigers	322	(657)
International career
Years	Team	Apps	(Points)
2000–2001	Ireland A	6	(7)
2000–2011	Ireland	72	(98)
2005	British & Irish Lions	2	(0)
Coaching career
- Years: Team
- 2013–2018: Leicester Tigers assistant
- 2018–2020: Leicester Tigers Head coach

Geordan Edward Andrew Murphy (born 19 April 1978) is an Irish rugby union rugby coach and player who retired from the professional game as the most-decorated man in Premiership Rugby history. He played as fullback or wing for the Irish international team and the English club Leicester Tigers as well as for the British & Irish Lions.

== Youth ==
Murphy was born in Dublin, Ireland. He was officially named George after his father but his mother called him Geordan to avoid confusion. His five brothers and sister all played rugby union. Murphy was educated at Newbridge College, Newbridge, County Kildare before attending Waterford Institute of Technology and De Montfort University in Leicester.

Murphy played Gaelic football at Minor (U18) level with Kildare GAA in the All-Ireland Minor Football Championship.

== Playing career ==
In 1997 shortly before he joined Leicester Tigers, Murphy gained his first U19 cap for Ireland, playing his club rugby with Naas. He gradually made his way into the Tigers' first team squad, while gaining caps for Ireland U21. Opportunities at fullback were limited by the presence of Tim Stimpson, but he gained a place on the right wing. Murphy started in both of Leicester's back-to-back Heineken Cup final wins in 2001 and 2002, scoring a try in the latter final. He also helped Leicester win four Premiership trophies in a row in 1999, 2000, 2001 and 2002.

Murphy broke his leg in Ireland's last warm-up game against Scotland at Murrayfield prior to the 2003 Rugby Union World Cup and did not compete. Two years later, however, he toured New Zealand with the British & Irish Lions, gaining two Test caps against Argentina and the All Blacks.

Murphy won his fifth Premiership medal in 2007, starting the final as Leicester defeated Gloucester.

As he matured, Murphy preferred full back over wing. His main rivals for the Ireland full back starting position were Girvan Dempsey and Rob Kearney. In his autobiography he stated that he had a poor working relationship with former Ireland Coach Eddie O'Sullivan mainly because he played for an English team. Murphy was named as the starting full back for Ireland in the crucial game against Argentina on 22 November 2008, and scored one of Ireland's two tries in that game.

He was a member of the Ireland team that won the 2009 Six Nations Championship and Grand Slam. In May 2009, Murphy was named in the Barbarians squad to play England and Australia along with Ireland teammate Gordon D'Arcy.

He took over the Tigers captaincy on the field in the 2008/09 season, when club captain Martin Corry was not in the team, and led them to two finals that season – Heineken Cup and English Premiership, the latter of which they won. The following season, he was named official club captain, though missed out on much of the season due to injury. He returned in February, to lead the team to a successive Guinness Premiership title, when the Tigers beat Saracens 33–27 in the final.

Murphy was chosen to captain Ireland against the New Zealand Maori in June 2010. On 11 September Murphy was picked to start in the first match of the 2011 Rugby World Cup since Rob Kearney was injured. Ireland won the game 22–10 against the United States. He came on then to replace Keith Earls in the Russia game.

In May 2012, Murphy announced his retirement from international rugby, and in May 2013, retired from playing all forms of the game after collecting the eighth Premiership title of his career, though he did not play in the Final win over Northampton that season.

== Coaching ==
Murphy joined the staff as an assistant coach at Leicester from the 2013–14 season onwards. He masterminded Tigers winning of the 2016–17 Anglo-Welsh Cup, the first Tigers trophy won in the period Murphy was part of the coaching team.

He acted as head coach for the September 2017 game versus Bath as new head coach Matt O'Connor had only just arrived. Murphy was placed in formal interim charge of Leicester Tigers on 3 September 2018 following the sacking of O'Connor. This position was made permanent in December 2018.

He was promoted to director of rugby on 1 July 2020 with the appointment of Steve Borthwick as head coach. His contract was terminated ahead of the 2020–21 season.

He took up the role of Director of Rugby Performance at Stamford School in August 2025.

== Honours ==
Leicester:

2x European (Heineken) Cup- 2001, 2002

8x Gallagher Premiership- 1999, 2000, 2001, 2002, 2007, 2009, 2010, 2013

2x Anglo-Welsh Cup- 2007, 2012

Ireland:

1x Six Nations Championship- 2009
