= Chris Mayor =

English rugby footballer

- Born: Chris Mayor; 19 May 1982 (age 44) Wigan, England
- Height: 1.88 m (6 ft 2 in)
- Weight: 99 kg (15 st 8 lb)
- School: St John’s RC High School
- University: Edge Hill

Rugby union career
- Position: Centre
Senior career
Years	Team	Apps	(Points)
2003–08	Sale Sharks	87	(80)
2008–10	Northampton Saints	35	(20)
2010-11	Gran Parma	20	(40)
2011-16	Wasps	56	(15)
2016-18	Sale FC	42	(65)
2018-19	Southport	17	(30)
- Barbarian F.C.
- Lancashire
- Correct as of 5 May 2019
National sevens team
Years	Team		Comps
2008	England		1
Coaching career
- Years: Team
- 2018-19: Southport Assistant head coach
- Rugby league career

Playing information
- Position: Centre
Club
Years	Team	Pld	T	G	FG	P
2000–03	Wigan Warriors

Chris Mayor (born 19 May 1982) is an English former professional rugby league and rugby union footballer who played in the 2000s and 2010s. He played for Wigan Warriors, and most recently played rugby union for Southport in the RFU's Lancs/Cheshire Division 1.

Mayor's position of choice is as a centre and he can also operate in any position in the back-line.

In the 2005–2006 season, Mayor played as a replacement and scored a try in the final as Sale Sharks won their first ever Premiership title. Mayor joined Northampton Saints at the end of the 2007–2008 season. He was largely used as substitute due to the impressive performances of Joe Ansbro and James Downey.

Mayor was linked with a return to rugby league with former club Wigan Warriors, that was never realised.

Mayor was part of the Sale FC Rugby National 2 North Championship team promoted to National One in May 2018.

June 2018 Mayor was appointed as player coach at Merseyside based club, Southport RFC working alongside head coach Neil Ryan. At the end of the season Mayor left his role at Southport.

In July 2022, Mayor was banned "from all sport for four years for attempting to use and traffic a banned human growth hormone".
