= Neil Back =

English rugby union player

Neil Back MBE
- Back celebrating the English 2003 World Cup victory.
- Born: Neil Antony Back MBE; 16 January 1969 (age 57) Coventry, England
- Height: 5 ft 10 in (1.78 m)
- Weight: 93 kg (205 lb; 14 st 9 lb)
- School: Woodlands School, Coventry

Rugby union career
- Position: Openside flanker
Amateur team(s)
Years	Team	Apps	(Points)
–	Barker's Butts		
–	Earlsdon		
Senior career
Years	Team	Apps	(Points)
1988–1990	Nottingham	38	(40)
1990–2005	Leicester Tigers	339	(615)
1988–2005	Total	377	(655)
International career
Years	Team	Apps	(Points)
1990–2003	England	69	(87)
1997, 2001, 2005	British & Irish Lions	5	(5)
Coaching career
- Years: Team
- 2003–2008: Leicester Tigers
- 2008–2011: Leeds Carnegie
- 2011–2012: Rugby Lions
- 2012–2013: Edinburgh Rugby

Neil Antony Back MBE (born 16 January 1969) is an English former rugby union player and coach. He played as an open-side flanker for Nottingham and Leicester Tigers, and won 69 international caps for England and 5 for the British & Irish Lions.

In his international career he played in three World Cups, 1995, 1999, and 2003, when he was an integral part of the 2003 World Cup winning side. He also played on three Lions tours: the victorious tour to South Africa in 1997, and to Australia in 2001 and New Zealand in 2005. Following World Cup victory with England in 2003, he combined the roles of player and defensive coach for Leicester Tigers until he retired, following a 17-year playing career. One of his final games saw him become the oldest test British Lion in history, in the first test match against New Zealand in 2005.

As a coach, he worked for Leicester, Leeds Carnegie and Edinburgh.

== Early life ==
Back was born in Coventry, where he attended The Woodlands School between September 1980 and July 1987. During his time at the school, he also played football, cricket, basketball, athletics and cross country before opting to strive to gain international status in rugby union. Back learnt his trade at junior clubs in Coventry, Earlsdon RFC and Barker's Butts RFC, and went on to represent England at Schools, Colts, U21 and Saxons levels.

== Playing career ==
He made his full England debut against Scotland in 1994 (in 2026, debut retrospectively awarded against Italy in 1990 where he scored a try, plus awarded a further two caps for tests he played v Canada in 1993) He began his senior playing career in 1988 for Nottingham.

In 1990 he joined Leicester Tigers and remained there for the next 18 years as a player and coach, gaining 339 caps and scoring a club record (for a forward) 125 tries.

Despite impressive performances between 1990 and 1995, he was not selected for England regularly, (although in 2026, he was retrospectively awarded cap for test against Italy in 1990 plus two for tests against Canada in 1993) picking up only 7 caps (now 10 caps) during this period, on the basis that he was considered too small by some selectors, at only 1.78 m (5 ft 10 in) and 93 kg (205 lb; 14.6 st).

His most controversial moment came in Leicester's 1996 Pilkington Cup final defeat against Bath. As the final whistle was blown, Back pushed referee Steve Lander to the ground. Back maintained that he had mistaken Lander for Bath back-row (and future England head coach) Andy Robinson. Back was given a six-month ban from the game, but from a dark moment blazed back even fitter, fresher and more focused than he had ever been following a 20-week, 6 days a week, twice a day torturous training schedule.

This led to a call-up to the 1997 British Lions tour to South Africa, where he played in the final two test matches, the second where the series was won. He subsequently became an important part of Clive Woodward's England team, forming the famous back-row unit with Richard Hill and Lawrence Dallaglio. He was also one of five Tigers players selected for his second Lions tour in 2001, winning another two Test caps, and then went on to become the oldest Test Lion in history on his third and final tour to New Zealand in 2005, earning his fifth test cap in the first Test.

In 1999 he was Leicester's top try scorer with 16 tries.

He scored a try in the 2001 Heineken Cup Final in which Leicester beat Stade Français Paris by 34–30, and won the lineout which led to Austin Healey's break and Leon Lloyd's winning try.

In the 2002 Heineken Cup Final he again aroused controversy. Tigers were leading Munster 15–9 in the final minutes of the match, and Munster had a scrum well inside the Leicester 22. With the referee distracted on the other side of the scrum, Back knocked the ball illegally from Munster scrum-half Peter Stringer's hands before the put-in and Leicester won possession and cleared the ball. The press and Munster fans were up in arms, though Munster's players sportingly conceded that gamesmanship was an integral part of the game.

He captained England on four occasions when Martin Johnson was injured. He took over the captaincy of Leicester for the 2003/4 season, but Johnson was reinstated as captain after the coaching coup that saw Dean Richards sacked as coach and replaced by John Wells, and Back was given a role as a Player/Defence Coach.

Back scored two tries in the 2003 Rugby World Cup and played his last game for England in their win over Australia in the final He won 69 caps (4 as captain) and played in three World Cups (1995, 1999 & 2003).

== Coaching career ==
Back's coaching career started at Leicester Tigers following England's World Cup success in 2003, when he became their defensive coach while still a player. When he finally retired from playing after the Lions' tour of New Zealand in 2005, he continued as Tigers' defensive coach, but to aid his coach development also took on the role of head coach of Leicester Tigers Academy and assistant forwards coach.

On 27 June 2008, Back left Leicester and signed a 3-year contract with Leeds Carnegie as head coach. In his first year Leeds Carnegie were promoted from the Championship to the Premiership, where they battled to remain against all the odds for the next 2 seasons on a very limited budget.

On 4 July 2011, after turning down a director of Rugby role at a Premiership Club announced that he would instead take on the same role at 'The Rugby Football Club (2011) Ltd', formerly known as 'Rugby Lions' in National League 3 Midlands, while Key became chief executive. Several high-quality players joined the new outfit, such as Ben Gollings and Leigh Hinton, which helped the Lions remain unbeaten all season (26 League + 5 Cup games), winning the League, automatic promotion and domestic cup in Back's first season.

During June 2012, Back joined Edinburgh Rugby's coaching staff alongside ex-Ireland international scrum half, Michael Bradley and Billy McGinty.

== Personal life ==
He is married to Alison, with whom he has a daughter, Olivia, who joined him on the winning podium in 2003, and a son, Finley.

== See also ==
- List of top English points scorers and try scorers
- Rugby Lions

Sporting positions
Preceded by Matt Dawson; Martin Johnson	English National Rugby Union Captain; Nov 2001; Mar–Apr 2002	Succeeded by Martin Johnson; Phil Vickery
