= Glenn Gelderbloom =

South African rugby union player

- Born: Glenn Kenneth Gelderbloom; 11 December 1969 (age 56) Cape Town, South Africa

Rugby union career
- Position: Centre
Senior career
Years	Team	Apps	(Points)
2000–2004	Leicester Tigers	74	(25)
- Correct as of July 2016

Glenn Kenneth Gelderbloom (born 11 December 1969) is a South African former professional rugby union centre who played in two Heineken Cup finals for Leicester Tigers in 2001 and 2002. Gelderbloom played 74 games between 2000 and 2004 for Leicester during which time he played in two Premiership title winning campaigns.

Gelderbloom played for Western Province in the Currie Cup, debuting in 1991, before moving to the Border Bulldogs in 1993 where he made over 100 appearances and captained them in their famous victory over Wales in 1998.

Gelderbloom signed for Leicester in August 2000, joining from second division Irish side Limerick. He made his Tigers debut against Cardiff on 12 August 2000 and played his last game for the club away against Wasps on 5 May 2004.

After playing for Tigers Gelderbloom joined Plymouth Albion as a player-coach before returning to Leicester as an academy coach and also teaching at nearby Oakham School.
