= Jamie Hamilton (rugby union) =

English rugby union player

- Born: James Garth Hamilton; 1 July 1970 (age 56) Guildford, England
- Height: 1.74 m (5 ft 9 in)
- Weight: 80 kg (176 lb)

Rugby union career
- Position: Scrum half
Amateur team(s)
Years	Team	Apps	(Points)
1986–1990	Lincoln		
Senior career
Years	Team	Apps	(Points)
1990–2003	Leicester Tigers	184	(118)
- Correct as of July 2016
International career
Years	Team	Apps	(Points)
- England Sevens
National sevens team
Years	Team		Comps
2001	England 7s		Hong Kong and Shanghai

James Garth Hamilton (born 1 July 1970) was a professional rugby union scrum half who played for Leicester Tigers from 1990 to 2003. During this time, he featured in two Heineken Cup finals in 2001 and 2002 as well as two Pilkington Cup finals at Twickenham.

Hamilton played 184 games for Leicester where he played in five Premiership title winning campaigns.

Hamilton made his Tigers debut against Nuneaton on 29 December 1990 and ended his playing career with Nuneaton in 2004.

He was also a keen Sevens player and represented England national rugby sevens team at Hong Kong and during the 2001 World Series.

In 2008, he moved to New Zealand to take up a position as a Performance Analyst with the Crusaders in Super Rugby. It was during this time that he worked with the Māori All Blacks travelling to the UK in 2012, USA and Canada in 2013 and Japan in 2014.

In 2015, he left the Crusaders to become the All Blacks Performance Analyst.
