= Tim Stimpson =

British Lions & England international rugby union player

- Born: Timothy Richard George Stimpson; 10 September 1973 (age 53) Liverpool, Merseyside, England
- Height: 6 ft 3 in (1.91 m)
- Weight: 16 st 7 lb (105 kg)
- School: Silcoates School
- University: University of Durham

Rugby union career
- Position: Full-back
Senior career
Years	Team	Apps	(Points)
- Wakefield
- West Hartlepool
- Newcastle Falcons
1998–2003	Leicester Tigers	125	(1455)
2003–2004	Perpignan	0	(0)
2004–2006	Leeds Tykes	29	(125)
–	Nottingham RFC		
International career
Years	Team	Apps	(Points)
- England U-21
- England Saxons
1996–2002	England	19	(35)
1997	British and Irish Lions	1	(0)

Timothy Richard George Stimpson (born 10 September 1973 in Liverpool) is a former rugby union international full back (and occasional wing). During his career he played for Wakefield, West Hartlepool, Newcastle Falcons, Leicester Tigers, Perpignan, Leeds Tykes and Nottingham, England and the British and Irish Lions. His international career was a start-stop affair, however, he excelled at club level. In particular, during his five-year spell at Leicester Tigers between 1998 and 2003, as a goalkicker, he was an integral part of the dominant Leicester side that won the league four times in succession to add to back-to-back Heineken Cup, becoming the Premiership's top points scorer in the process (his points total has now been overtaken by both Jonny Wilkinson and Andy Goode).

== Early life ==
Stimpson was educated at Silcoates School, Wakefield. In 1992, he went to the University of Durham, where he studied anthropology at Grey College, graduating in 1995.

== Club career ==
Stimpson fell out with Newcastle's management and Rob Andrew during the 1997–98 season and only made four appearances for them as they won the Premiership. At the end of the season he signed for Leicester Tigers. After the retirement of Joel Stransky in 1999 he became Leicester Tigers' principal goalkicker.

In the 2001 Heineken Cup Final against Stade Français Paris he converted Leon Lloyd's last minute try from the right-hand touchline—the most difficult position to kick a conversion from for a right-footed kicker—to take the match from 32–30 to 34–30 to Leicester. This meant that to win the match, Stade would have had to score a try rather than the easier task of their fly-half Diego Dominguez, who kicked all of Stade's points, landing a goal. There were no further scores.

A year later, in the 2002 Heineken Cup semi-final against Llanelli. With only a few minutes remaining, the score was 10–12 to Llanelli, Stimpson having kicked a penalty and converted Harry Ellis's try, Stephen Jones having kicked four penalties for the Scarlets. In windy conditions, Tigers were awarded a penalty at a scrum inside their own half, and Stimpson elected to go for goal from 60m out. The ball hit one of the posts and the crossbar, before going over to give the Tigers a 13–12 lead which they held onto to gain the victory. Tigers went on to win the final against Munster, Stimpson kicking a penalty and a conversion.

In 2003 he was rumoured to be linked to French club Perpignan despite having time left on his contract at Leicester. Despite initial denials from Tigers' management, he did sign and moved to France after the 2003 World Cup, Tigers releasing him from his contract. However, he failed to play for Perpignan and in 2004 returned to England to play for Leeds Tykes. While at Leeds he helped them win the Powergen Cup in 2005, however he was not in the squad for the final itself. He decided to retire from playing for Leeds Tykes to pursue a career in coaching in January 2006. In the summer of 2006 his services were used by Nottingham Rugby Club, where he presently holds a part-time coaching role.

Stimpson won a record five consecutive Premiership titles with Newcastle Falcons and Leicester Tigers.

The Leeds Tykes Coach, Phil Davies, commented "he will always be remembered as one of the most successful players ever in the professional era in this country".

== International career ==
Stimpson went on the 1997 British Lions tour to South Africa and would have played in the tests as first choice full back were it not for the better goal-kicking of Neil Jenkins that was crucial to the Lions' series victory.
