= Will Johnson (rugby union, born 1974) =

English rugby union player

- Born: William Warwick Johnson; 18 March 1974 (age 52) Solihull, Warwickshire, England
- Height: 1.93 m (6 ft 4 in)
- Weight: 108 kg (238 lb)
- Notable relative: Martin Johnson

Rugby union career
- Position: Number 8
Senior career
Years	Team	Apps	(Points)
1994-2006	Leicester	212	(45)
2006	Coventry		
2006-2008	Treviso		
2008-2010	RC Nice		
- Correct as of 19 Dec 2006

William Warwick Johnson (born 18 March 1974 in Solihull) is a former rugby union player who played at Number 8 for Leicester Tigers between 1994 and 2006, as well as later Treviso in Italy and RC Nice in France.

He is perhaps best known for being Martin Johnson's younger brother, but yet played over 200 times for Leicester and gained a number of caps for England 'A'. A good club man, known for technique and work rate, Johnson started the epic 2001 Heineken Cup Final against Stade Francais, breaking his arm and being replaced by Paul Gustard. The following year he was an unused replacement as Leicester retained the trophy. Johnson played seven times for England A but never made the break through to international level, in a similar fashion to another Leicester back rower John Wells.

Johnson joined Coventry R.F.C. in July 2006 and was made club captain, but left in December of that year to join Italian side Benetton Treviso. Since then he has moved on to captain Rugby Nice Côte d'Azur where he plays alongside Dan Luger and Kevin Yates.
