= Leon Lloyd =

England international rugby union player

- Born: Leon David Lloyd; 22 September 1977 (age 49) Coventry, England
- Height: 6 ft 4 in (1.93 m)
- Weight: 15 st 6 lb (216 lb 98 kg)
- School: Coundon Court

Rugby union career
- Position: Wing / Outside Centre
Senior career
Years	Team	Apps	(Points)
1996–2007	Leicester Tigers	266	(460)
2007–2008	Gloucester Rugby	6	(25)
International career
Years	Team	Apps	(Points)
2000–2001	England	5	(10)

Leon David Lloyd (born 22 September 1977 in Coventry) is a retired English rugby union footballer who played wing or outside centre for Leicester Tigers between 1996 and 2007, spending his final 2007/8 season at Gloucester.

== Background ==
Leon Lloyd was born in Coventry in the Midlands where he grew up and attended Coundon Court School. He played for England Schools, England Colts, England U21s, Eng 7s and the Barbarians and was a successful try scorer for the Tigers Youth XV and Development XV. Lloyd made his debut at Leicester in 1996 at the age of 17 and soon after played for England U21 before going on to gain his first two caps for England in 2000 against South Africa.

== Rugby career ==
Lloyd made his debut at Leicester Tigers in 1996, displaced ageing England international Rory Underwood from the side. That same year Lloyd was part of the squad that won the Madrid Sevens and in the following year was a substitute in the 1997 Heineken Cup Final, which Leicester lost 28–9 to Brive.

Under backs coach Joel Stransky, Lloyd was shifted inside from the wing to outside centre.

Lloyd played for England U21, England 7s, the Barbarians England Colts and England Schools and prior to making his début for the Tigers first team, was a successful try scorer for the Tigers Youth XV and Development XV before a serious car accident sidelined him for six months.

Lloyd was included as an injury replacement in England's 1999 World Cup squad but didn't feature in any matches. He went on to gain his first two caps the following season as a replacement against South Africa in 2000, but concern was raised about his discipline as he was seen punching a Springbok player.

He played in the England side during 2001 tour to North America, where he played in three tests and scored two tries. Unfortunately he suffered a shoulder injury that required surgery and kept him out of the Tigers squad for the start of the 2001/02 season and ultimately cost him his place in the England team.

However, he recovered well and scored two tries, including the match-winner in Tigers' 2001 Heineken Cup Final, only to be injured again when Leicester retained the trophy in May 2002. That injury also ruled him out of the England Sevens squad for the Commonwealth Games in Manchester.

Lloyd agreed a deal to leave Leicester Tigers for Guinness Premiership team Gloucester Rugby. in 2007 where he scored five tries in just six games. However, his playing career was cut short in 2008 after he suffered a career-ending knee injury during a game against the Ospreys.

== Business career ==
In 2009 Lloyd was appointed foundation director for Oakham School, a private school in the Midlands, where he used his contacts to help raise funds for the school, ensuring its continued success and financial security.

Lloyd is a Director of social enterprise Switch the Play, an organisation that supports athlete transition through and beyond sport.

His book, Life After Sport 'From Boot Room to Board Room' talks about the rigours of post-sport life and Lloyd's own transition from rugby to business.
