= Austin Healey =

British Lions & England international rugby union player

- Born: Austin Sean Healey; 26 October 1973 (age 53) Wallasey, Cheshire, England
- Height: 5 ft 10 in (1.78 m)
- Weight: 13 st 10 lb (87 kg)

Rugby union career
- Position(s): Scrum half, Winger, Fly-half, Fullback
Amateur team(s)
Years	Team	Apps	(Points)
1990–1994	Birkenhead Park FC Waterloo		
2006	Bishop's Stortford		
Senior career
Years	Team	Apps	(Points)
1994–1996	Orrell		
1996–2006	Leicester Tigers	237	(322)
International career
Years	Team	Apps	(Points)
1997–2003	England	51	(75)
1997, 2001	British & Irish Lions	2	
- Correct as of England

Austin Sean Healey (born 26 October 1973 in Wallasey (now part of Merseyside, formerly Cheshire), is an English former rugby union player who played as a utility back for Leicester Tigers, and represented both England and the British & Irish Lions.

He has 51 England caps and 2 Lions caps. He played for England at scrum half, fly-half, fullback and wing, and was often used as a replacement (or substitute) because of his versatility. He is a famously competitive and "outspoken" character, gaining the nickname "The Leicester Lip".

Since retiring he has worked in the media.

== Rugby career ==
=== Early career ===
Healey played for England U21 in 1992 and went on to represent England A and the Barbarians '96 tour of Japan. After spells at Waterloo and Orrell, Healey initially signed for Leicester as a scrum half, having played at wing and outside centre for Orrell. He made his full England début against Ireland during the 1997 Five Nations tournament, and toured with the British Lions in 1997, making two appearances.

He has played in the Five/Six Nations tournaments (‘98-'02) and in the 1999 World Cup. In the 1999/00 season he was voted both Leicester Tigers' and Allied Dunbar's Player of the Season.

Leicester coach Bob Dwyer switched him to the wing to accommodate Fijian Waisale Serevi at scrum half. Healey was then selected on the wing for England.

After an injury to Tigers' South African fly-half Joel Stransky, and the unsuitability of others such as Pat Howard and Andy Goode to fill the role, Healey was switched to fly-half. In this position, however, he was unable to make much of an international impression, his sole appearance at fly-half coming in the 2000 tour to South Africa in the first test, after Jonny Wilkinson fell victim to food poisoning.

In 2001 he made the break during the Heineken Cup final that resulted in the winning try - Healey had started the match at scrum half with Andy Goode at 10, but was switched to fly-half in the closing minutes. He also scored the second and decisive try against Munster when Tigers retained the cup the following year.

==== 2001 Lions and controversy ====
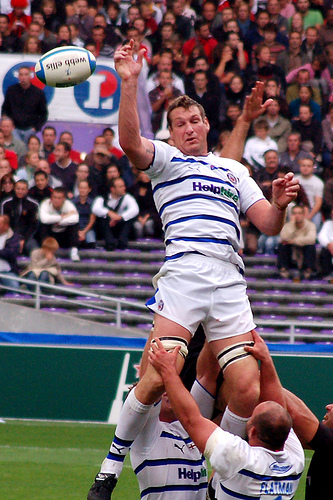
Healey ridiculed the Australian lock Justin Harrison and expressed anti-Australian sentiment

Healey's good form for Leicester Tigers during the 2000–01 Premiership Rugby season, was rewarded with three test starts on the right wing for England during the 2001 Six Nations, and selection for his second tour with the British & Irish Lions to Australia as a scrum-half. The tour became notorious however for newspaper columns in which Healey and fellow scrum-half Matt Dawson would publicly reveal the tensions within the playing squad and criticise Head Coach Graham Henry, the "grueling" training regimes and the lack of down-time the players were allowed.

In a Guardian newspaper column published the day before the series decider, Healey again criticised the training schedules and selection, but also ridiculed the Australian lock Justin Harrison and criticised "Australian life" in general. The column referred to Harrison as a "plod", "plank" and "an ape" and seemed to express anti-Australian sentiment with comments like "spin this, you Aussies: up yours", "What is it with this country?" and "What are we going to do with this thing called the Aussie male?"

However, Healey's criticisms seemed to backfire as his column included the comment "Me and the plank. Do you think one of us will have the final say? I'll say so." and while Healey did not play in the final test, Harrison would steal a crucial late lineout, retaining possession for Australia and effectively sealing the series victory. Healey avoided being sent home from the tour, but would later face a disciplinary committee who found him guilty of bringing the Lions into disrepute and breaching his tour contract for which he was fined £2,500.

==== Later career ====
On his return from Australia he played in every game for England until he was rested for the summer 2002 tour to Argentina, showing his versatility by starting at fullback, scrum half, and wing and came on twice as a replacement.

He returned to international action appearing as a replacement in all three of the following season's autumn internationals when England recorded a series of victories over Australia, New Zealand and South Africa.

Healey flew out to Australia as injury cover for the victorious 2003 Rugby World Cup, however he was never officially added to the squad after certain players recovered, meaning he was unable to pick up a medal for the success despite flying out to Australia.

==== 2005/2006 season ====
Tigers finished top of the league. A notable performance for Healey was Away at Wasps, where he scored in the last minute to steal a draw. However, Wasps hammered Tigers in the final. In the 05/06 season, Healey was handed club vice-captaincy and regularly captained the team from scrum half and fly half during the international period. He looked back to near his best form and pressed both Harry Ellis and Andy Goode out of their respective regular slots of 9 and 10 at different times throughout the season. Leicester made the premiership final again and were beaten by Sale Sharks, Healey claims to have thrown his silver medal away in disgust at the end of the game, claiming that he didn't do 'losers medals'.

==== Retirement ====
Following retirement from Leicester Tigers at the end of the 2005/6 season, Healey planned to start a new career as a banker with Credit Suisse and to also continue working as a BBC analyst.

== Post-playing career ==
Since his retirement, Healey has worked as a rugby journalist and TV pundit for both the BBC and TNT Sports, becoming known for his outspoken opinions. While working for the BBC in the final round of the 2013 Six Nations Championship Healey tweeted "Wow, not much abuse from the Welsh tonight. Aldi must of (sic) had a Special Brew shortage over the weekend. Bring it on next week!" Healey then tweeted "Happy to bet a pound with every person in Wales ENGLAND take the 6 nations". The offer was reported by Wales Online with many people contacting Healey to accept the wager, including his former Strictly Come Dancing judge Arlene Phillips and his Wales adversary Rupert Moon. However, Wales defeated England by 30-3 winning the championship in the process. With Healey tweeting that he would not be honouring the bet.

Healey's commentary for TNT Sports attracted controversy during the 2022–23 European Rugby Champions Cup semi-final between Saracens and La Rochelle. Healey accused the referee Andrew Brace of favouring La Rochelle as well as suggesting that the French television directors were denying the Television Match Official (TMO) access to certain viewpoints if it favoured the French side to do so. Healey was subsequently accused of bias and criticised on social media. Healey again responded to the criticism via social media stating "I'm right and you are wrong I'm afraid."

In 2024, during Healey's commentary of a Premiership Rugby match between Saracens and Harlequins, Healey called for the Television Match Official (TMO) to look at an incident. Moments later, the TMO could be clearly heard stating "the problem I have got now of course is it looks like Healey has instigated it, yeah?" followed by "Yeah, mate, the problem I have got now is that it looks like Austin has instigated it, because we're late, so I don't want to talk about it, OK?" These comments were clearly audible to the TV audience with some feeling that this was evidence that Healey's commentary had an inadvertent impacted the officiating of the game. Healey later tweeted "Think the TMO has had better days, looks like ego got in the way of ruling on foul play." Premiership Rugby, TNT Sports and the Professional Game Match Officials defended the official, stating that the incident was "an unusual and unfortunate occurrence".

Following his commentary for the 2025 England versus Australia test match, Healey made a number of comments relating to the officiating of referee Nika Amashukeli. Healey also called for more aggressive play and suggested players should be allowed to fight on the field. Healey's commentary was again the subject of online criticism. With one commenter stating he would pay good money to get the chance to "fill you in" Healey asked how much was "good money for you?" Before stating that he had bought a "bloody big house" via his commentary work.

== Other television appearances ==
Healey competed in the sixth series of the BBC competition series Strictly Come Dancing with professional dancer Erin Boag. He was eliminated in week 12 of the competition to come 4th overall.

He joined Gary Lineker on Who Wants to Be a Millionaire? Christmas Special, on 23 December 2008. Together they won £50,000 for their chosen charity - Nicholls Spinal Injury Foundation.

Healey presented The Big Tackle on ITV in March 2009, aimed at promoting and assisting rugby clubs around the country. In January 2009, he obtained his basic coaching qualifications, in order to put him in a better position from which to advise clubs. During the filming, he returned to his roots and visited his former local club, Birkenhead Park. Some of the other teams that he coached on the series included; Bristol Barbarians, Witney Angels RFC, Rosslyn Park, and University of Sussex.

He competed on show one of the new series of Beat the Star in April 2009. He won 4/8 games, and ended up with 22 points overall, beating his opponent; Factory Manager, Glenn Clarke, who had 14 points overall.

Healey appeared as one of the team captains for the second series of Hole in the Wall along with ex-EastEnders star Joe Swash.

Austin is the host of the ITV gameshow The Fuse, which began on 13 July 2009.

In 2011 Healey appeared on the Chase, a celebrity edition, reaching the final with Joe Pasquale. Shaun Wallace was the Chaser and the pair won with the Chaser needing two more questions in the final chase.

He also appeared on BBC gameshow, Mastermind, on 4 January 2013. His specialist subject was Everton Football Club.

== Autobiography ==
Healey's autobiography, Lions, Tigers and Roses, was published by Oxford University Press in 2001.

== See also ==
- List of top English points scorers and try scorers
