= Andy Goode =

England international rugby union player (born 1980)

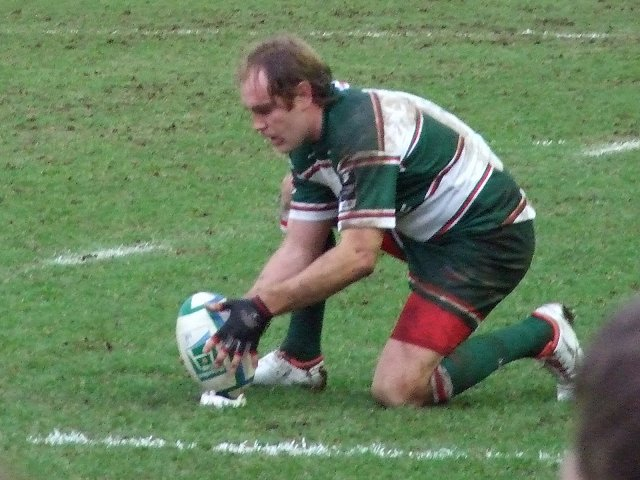
- Goode in 2008
- Born: Andrew James Goode; 3 April 1980 (age 46) Coventry, England
- Height: 1.80 m (5 ft 11 in)
- Weight: 97 kg (214 lb; 15 st 4 lb)
- School: King Henry VIII School, Coventry; Bromsgrove School, Worcestershire

Rugby union career
- Position(s): Fly-half, fullback
Senior career
Years	Team	Apps	(Points)
1998–2002	Leicester Tigers	78	(260)
2002–2003	Saracens	37	(418)
2003–2008	Leicester Tigers	121	(1,539)
2008–2010	Brive	36	(316)
2010	Sharks	8	(37)
2010–2013	Worcester Warriors	83	(823)
2013–2015	Wasps	51	(468)
2015–2016	Newcastle Falcons	9	(73)
Total		423	(3,934)
International career
Years	Team	Apps	(Points)
2005–2009	England	17	(107)

Andrew James Goode (born 3 April 1980) is an English sports pundit and former rugby union player. Goode had an 18-year professional career playing over 400 games and scoring over 4,000 points for Leicester Tigers, Saracens, Worcester Warriors, Wasps and Newcastle Falcons in England's Premiership Rugby, CA Brive in France's Top 14 and for Super Rugby's Sharks in South Africa. Goode represented England 17 times between 2005 and 2009 scoring 107 points.

Goode is the second highest scorer of all time in Premiership Rugby, having previously been the record holder. During his career he won five Premiership titles (1999–2002 and 2007) and two European Cups (2001 and 2002) all with Leicester; he also won the RFU Championship with Worcester Warriors.

== Early life ==
Born 3 April 1980 in Coventry, Goode attended King Henry VIII School in Coventry and Bromsgrove School in Bromsgrove, Worcestershire. He started playing rugby union at the age of five at Barkers Butts, before moving to Nuneaton at 12. He also played for Warwickshire, the Midlands and England Schools. He joined Coventry aged 16.

In 1998 Goode was selected to play for England Schools U18 and represented England at U21 level, playing at the 2000 SANZAR tournament in New Zealand.

== Club career ==
Goode joined Leicester Tigers after leaving school in 1998. Despite his youth he played a substantial part in the Tigers' record four successive Premiership titles and also won two Heineken Cup winners' medals. He started the 2001 final and was an unused replacement in the 2002 final. He later moved to Saracens and after moved back to his old club Leicester in 2003.

Goode was nominated for player of the Season 2004-5 and the PRA Players' Player of the Year. He ended the season voted player of the year by the Leicester Tigers members and players. In March 2008, Goode became the all-time leading points scorer in the English Premiership, overtaking Jonny Wilkinson. Goode won his fifth Premiership medal in 2007, starting the final as Leicester defeated Gloucester. In the game he scored a try, three conversions and a penalty.

Following Leicester's 07/08 season, Goode left Welford Road and signed for French club CA Brive. He had a very impressive start in the Top 14, scoring 235 points in his first season, making him the second highest point scorer in the 2008–09 Top 14 season.

He spent the early part of 2010 on loan to South African Super 14 franchise, the Sharks. He made his Sharks debut off the bench against the Crusaders, but was sin-binned six minutes from full-time in this game following a head high tackle on Dan Carter.

In February 2010, Goode signed with then English Premiership side Worcester Warriors. He joined the side in the summer, in preparation for the new season starting in September 2010.

Goode scored a try, two conversions, a penalty and a drop-goal in leading Worcester Warriors to victory in the second leg of the Championship final against Cornish Pirates. This guaranteed promotion to the English Premiership for the 2011/2012 season.

He returned to Welford Road in April 2012 for the match against Leicester Tigers but was sent off in the first half after hitting his old team Tom Croft high and late with his arm. Despite this performance, Goode's consistent kicking performances were important in ensuring they ended the season above London Wasps and Newcastle Falcons.

On 5 March 2013 it was announced that Goode would join London Wasps from the start of the 2013/2014 season.

On 21 December 2014, in Wasps' first permanent home match at the Ricoh Arena in his home town of Coventry, Goode set a Premiership record of 33 points in a single match with 1 try, 2 conversions and 8 penalties, beating the joint record of 32 points set by Niall Woods and equalled by Dave Walder and Tim Stimpson, as Wasps beat London Irish 48–16.

On 16 February 2015, it was announced Goode would join London Irish at the end of the season. However, on 8 September 2015, it was announced he would retire due to injury problems without playing a single game for London Irish. He was therefore released from his contract.

On 28 December 2015, after having his injuries treated with a botulinum toxin solution, Goode came out of retirement with the Newcastle Falcons for three months as injury cover for Mike Delaney and Ruki Tipuna. Goode's first outing in Newcastle colours was in an Aviva A League match against Leicester Tigers A on 4 January 2016. He made his last appearance for Newcastle on 27 March 2016 and retired for a second time.

Goode was inducted into Premiership Rugby's hall of fame in June 2021.

== International career ==
Goode played five times for England Saxons in 2001 and 2002. He also played 17 times for England.

He made his England début as a replacement for Charlie Hodgson in the 2005 Six Nations victory over Italy, in which he also scored his first points from a conversion.

Just before the 2009 Six Nations, Goode was called up to train with the England team and was subsequently named in the starting line-up for the match against Italy. He went on to score the opening try of the 2009 Six Nations and converted it himself, ending the match with 16 points. While playing against Argentina Old Trafford on 6 June 2009 he scored 22 points. He then scored 17 points against them in the match in Salta.

== After retirement ==
After retiring from professional rugby, Goode has become a sport TV pundit and host of a podcast named The Rugby Pod with Jim Hamilton, another former international rugby union player from Scotland. Goode has now become a fitness and lifestyle influencer after a dramatic weight loss regimen, and has posed topless on social media.
