= List of England national rugby union team records =

The England Men's national rugby union team competed in the first international rugby match in 1871 against Scotland. Since then, they have played in 813 matches.

The record for most test points by an England Men's player is held by Owen Farrell, who scored 1237 points between 2012 and 2023. The record for the number of test tries is held by Rory Underwood, who scored 49 tries in 85 matches between 1984 and 1996.

Currently active players are listed in bold. This list includes only points and tries scored playing for England, and does not include those scored for the British & Irish Lions.

This article only covers the England men's national team. Details of England women's national rugby union team records are shown on a different page.

== Team records ==
=== Greatest winning margin ===
As of November 2024

Margin	Opposing team	Result	Date	Ground	Competition
134	Romania	134–0	17 November 2001	Twickenham Stadium, London, England	2001 end-of-year rugby union internationals
110	Netherlands	110–0	14 November 1998	John Smith's Stadium, Huddersfield, England	1999 Rugby World Cup Qualifier
98	United States	106–8	21 August 1999	Twickenham Stadium, London, England	1999 USA Tour
98	Uruguay	111–13	2 November 2003	Suncorp Stadium, Brisbane, Australia	2003 Rugby World Cup
91	Tonga	101–10	15 October 1999	Twickenham Stadium, London, England	1999 Rugby World Cup
78	Georgia	84–6	12 October 2003	Subiaco Oval, Perth, Australia	2003 Rugby World Cup
71	Chile	71–0	23 September 2023	Stade Pierre-Mauroy, Lille, France	2023 Rugby World Cup
70	Canada	70–0	13 November 2004	Twickenham Stadium, London, England	2004 Canada Tour
66	Tonga	69–3	6 November 2021	Twickenham Stadium, London, England	2021 end-of-year rugby union internationals
64	Romania	67–3	24 September 2011	Otago Stadium, Dunedin, New Zealand	2011 Rugby World Cup

=== Greatest losing margin ===
As of November 2024

Margin	Opposing team	Result	Date	Ground	Competition
76	Australia	0–76	6 June 1998	Lang Park, Brisbane, Australia	1998 England Tour
48	South Africa	10–58	26 May 2007	Free State Stadium, Bloemfontein, South Africa	2007 England Tour
43	France	10–53	11 March 2023	Twickenham Stadium, London, England	2023 Six Nations
42	New Zealand	22–64	20 June 1998	Carisbrook, Dunedin, New Zealand	1998 England Tour
36	Australia	15–51	26 June 2004	Lang Park, Brisbane, Australia	2004 England Tour
36	South Africa	0–36	14 September 2007	Stade de France, Saint-Denis, France	2007 Rugby World Cup
36	South Africa	6–42	22 November 2008	Twickenham Stadium, London, England	2008 South Africa Tour
33	New Zealand	3–36	12 June 2004	Carisbrook, Dunedin, New Zealand	2004 England Tour
33	South Africa	22–55	2 June 2007	Loftus Versfeld Stadium, Pretoria, South Africa	2007 England Tour
32	New Zealand	12–44	21 June 2008	Lancaster Park, Christchurch, New Zealand	2008 England Tour
31	Australia	3–34	11 June 2006	Stadium Australia, Sydney, Australia	2006 England Tour

== Individual career records ==
=== Most appearances ===
As of 21 November 2026

Rank	Name	Caps	Position	Career
1	Ben Youngs	127	Scrum-half	2010–2023
2	Dan Cole	118	Prop	2010–2024
3	**Jamie George**	115	Hooker	2015–
4	Jason Leonard	114	Prop	1990–2003
5	**Owen Farrell**	112	Fly-half / centre	2012–2023
6	**George Ford**	109	Fly-half	2014–
7	**Maro Itoje**	105	Lock / flanker	2016–
7	**Courtney Lawes**	105	Lock / flanker	2009–2023
9	Danny Care	101	Scrum-half	2008–2024
10	Dylan Hartley	97	Hooker	2008–2018
11	Joe Marler	95	Prop	2012–2024
12	Jonny Wilkinson	91	Fly-half	1998–2011
13	**Ellis Genge**	86	Prop	2016-
14	Lawrence Dallaglio	85	Number 8	1995–2007
14	Rory Underwood	85	Wing	1984–1996
16	Martin Johnson	84	Lock	1993–2003
17	**Henry Slade**	80	Centre	2015-
18	Jonny May	78	Wing	2013–2023
18	**Mako Vunipola**	78	Prop	2012–2023
18	Joe Worsley	78	Flanker	1999–2011

=== Most points ===
As of 21 November 2026

Rank	Name	Points	Tries	Con	Pen	DGs	Caps	Avr.	Position	Career
1	**Owen Farrell**	1237	10	190	262	5	112	11	Fly-half	2012–2023
2	Jonny Wilkinson	1179	6	162	239	36	91	12.96	Fly-half	1998–2011
3	**George Ford**	505	10	94	79	10	109	4.63	Fly-half	2014–
4	Paul Grayson	400	2	78	72	6	32	12.5	Fly-half	1995–2004
5	Rob Andrew	396	2	33	86	21	71	5.58	Fly-half	1985–1997
6	**Marcus Smith**	343	18	62	42	1	56	6.13	Fly-half	2021–
7	Toby Flood	301	4	40	66	1	60	5.02	Fly-half	2006–2013
8	Jonathan Webb	296	4	41	66	0	33	8.97	Full-back	1987–1993
9	Charlie Hodgson	269	8	44	44	3	38	7.08	Fly-half	2001–2012
10	Dusty Hare	240	2	14	67	1	25	9.6	Full-back	1974–1984

=== Most tries ===
As of 14 March 2026

Rank	Name	Tries	Caps	Ratio	Position	Career
1	Rory Underwood	49	85	0.58	Wing	1984–1996
2	Jonny May	36	78	0.46	Wing	2013–2023
3	Will Greenwood	31	55	0.56	Centre	1997–2004
3	Ben Cohen	31	57	0.54	Wing	2000–2006
5	Jeremy Guscott	30	65	0.46	Centre	1989–1999
6	Jason Robinson	28	51	0.55	Full-back	2001–2007
7	Dan Luger	24	38	0.63	Wing	1998–2003
8	Anthony Watson	23	56	0.41	Wing	2014–2023
9	Josh Lewsey	22	55	0.4	Wing	1998–2007
10	Chris Ashton	20	44	0.45	Wing	2010–2019
10	Mark Cueto	20	55	0.36	Wing	2004–2011
10	**Elliot Daly**	20	75	0.27	Wing	2016–
10	**Manu Tuilagi**	20	60	0.35	Centre	2011–2024
10	Ben Youngs	20	127	0.16	Scrum-half	2010–2023

=== Most matches as captain ===
As of 6 July 2025

Rank	Name	Tests	Won	Drew	Lost	Win %	Position	Career	Honours as captain
1	Will Carling	59	44	1	14	74.6	Centre	1988–1996	1991 Grand Slam; 1991 RWC Final; 1992 Grand Slam; 1995 Grand Slam; 1996 Five Nations Championship & Triple Crown
2	Owen Farrell	48	31	2	15	64.6	Fly-half / centre	2018–2023	2019 RWC Final; 2020 Six Nations Championship & Triple Crown; 2023 Rugby World Cup Third Place
3	Chris Robshaw	42	25	0	17	59.5	Flanker	2012–2017	2014 Triple Crown
4	Martin Johnson	39	34	0	5	87.2	Lock	1998–2003	2001 Six Nations Championship; 2002 Triple Crown; 2003 Grand Slam; 2003 RWC Champions
5	Dylan Hartley	30	25	1	4	83.3	Hooker	2012–2018	2016 Grand Slam; 2017 Six Nations Championship
6	Lawrence Dallaglio	22	10	2	10	45.5	Number 8	1997–2004	1998 Triple Crown
7	Bill Beaumont	21	11	2	8	52.4	Lock	1978–1982	1980 Grand Slam
7	Steve Borthwick	21	9	1	11	42.9	Lock	2008–2010	None
9	Martin Corry	17	9	0	8	52.9	Lock	2005–2007	None
10	Phil Vickery	15	10	0	5	66.7	Prop	2002–2008	2007 RWC Final

== Individual match records ==
=== Most points in a match ===
As of 14 November 2026

Rank	Player	Pos	Points	Tries	Con	Pen	DGs	Result	Opposition	Competition	Date
1	Charlie Hodgson	Fly-half	44	2	14	2	0	**134**–0	Romania	2001 end-of-year rugby union internationals	17 November 2001
2	Paul Grayson	Fly-half	36	0	12	4	0	**101**–10	Tonga	1999 Rugby World Cup	15 October 1999
3	Jonny Wilkinson	Fly-half	35	1	9	4	0	**80**–23	Italy	2001 Six Nations Championship	17 February 2001
4	Jonny Wilkinson	Fly-half	32	1	6	5	0	**67**–7	Italy	1999 Rugby World Cup	2 October 1999
5	Rob Andrew	Fly-half	30	0	6	6	0	**60**–19	Canada	1994 Canada Tour	10 December 1994
5	Paul Grayson	Fly-half	30	0	15	0	0	**110**–0	Netherlands	1999 Rugby World Cup qualification	14 November 1998
5	Jonny Wilkinson	Fly-half	30	1	5	4	1	**50**–10	Wales	2002 Six Nations Championship	23 March 2002
8	Dave Walder	Fly-half	29	2	5	3	0	**59**–20	Canada	2001 England Tour	9 June 2001
9	Rob Andrew	Fly-half	27	1	2	5	1	**32**–15	South Africa	1994 England Tour	9 June 1994
9	Jonny Wilkinson	Fly-half	27	0	0	8	1	**27**–22	South Africa	2000 England Tour	24 June 2000
9	Charlie Hodgson	Fly-half	27	1	2	5	1	**32**–16	South Africa	2004 Autumn Internationals	20 November 2004
9	Jonny Wilkinson	Fly-half	27	1	2	5	1	**42**–20	Scotland	2007 Six Nations Championship	3 February 2007
9	**George Ford**	Fly-half	27	0	0	6	3	**27**–10	Argentina	2023 Rugby World Cup	9 September 2023

=== Most tries in a match ===
As of 14 November 2026

Tries	Player	Position	Result	Opposition	Competition	Date
5	Douglas Lambert	Wing	**41**–13	France	1907 test match	5 January 1907
5	Rory Underwood	Wing	**58**–23	Fiji	1989 Fiji Tour	4 November 1989
5	Josh Lewsey	Full-back	**111**–13	Uruguay	2003 Rugby World Cup	2 November 2003
5	**Henry Arundell**	Wing	**71**–0	Chile	2023 Rugby World Cup	23 September 2023
5	**Will Joseph**	Wing	**78**–15	Japan	2026 Nations Championship	14 November 2026
4	George Burton	Forward	**8G**–0G	Wales	1881 Home Nations matches	19 February 1881
4	Arthur Hudson	Wing	**35**–8	France	1906 test match	22 March 1906
4	Ronald Poulton	Centre	**39**–13	France	1914 Five Nations Championship	13 April 1914
4	Chris Oti	Wing	**58**–3	Romania	1989 England Tour	13 May 1989
4	Neil Back	Flanker	**110**–0	Netherlands	1999 Rugby World Cup qualification	14 November 1998
4	Jeremy Guscott	Centre	**110**–0	Netherlands	1999 Rugby World Cup qualification	14 November 1998
4	Jeremy Guscott	Centre	**106**–8	United States	1999 USA Tour	21 August 1999
4	Jason Robinson	Full-back	**134**–0	Romania	2001 end-of-year rugby union internationals	17 November 2001
4	Nick Easter	Number 8	**62**–5	Wales	2007 Rugby World Cup warm-up matches	4 August 2007
4	Chris Ashton	Wing	**59**–13	Italy	2011 Six Nations Championship	12 February 2011

== See also ==
- England rugby union try record progression
- List of leading rugby union test point scorers
- List of leading rugby union test try scorers
- List of rugby union test caps leaders
