= 2006 South Africa rugby union tour of Ireland and England =

International sporting competition

- Manager: Jake White
- Tour captain: John Smit
Summary
P	W	D	L
Total
4	2	0	2
Test match
3	1	0	2
Opponent
P	W	D	L
Ireland
1	0	0	1
England
2	1	0	1

The 2006 South Africa rugby union tour of Ireland and England was a series of matches played in November and December 2006 in Ireland and England by South Africa national rugby union team.

The Springboks, coached by Jake White lost the test with Ireland, drew the series (1–1) to England and won against a World XV selection.

== Results ==
=== First test in Dublin ===
A bad defeat against Ireland, that had never before scored four tries against Springboks in a century. In the first half, Irish, made three tries that exposed the poor defence of Pierre Spies in particular and Bryan Habana out of position at 13. Spies was twice caught charging out of the line and the Irish swiftly punished that opening each time. The Springboks, fielding a largely experimental side, fought hard as Habana and debutant Francois Steyn dotted down in the second half. That comeback was roundly ended by Horgan after O'Driscoll expertly put him away to seal the game.

The match celebrate the centenary of the first Springboks tour and South Africa played in the kit worn by the 1906 touring squad, which was captained by Paul Roos.

11 November 2006
17:00 WET

Ireland	32–15	South Africa
Try: Trimble; D. Wallace; Horan; Horgan; Con: O'Gara (3); Pen: O'Gara (2)	Report	Try: F. Steyn; Habana; Con: A. Pretorius; Pen: A. Pretorius

Lansdowne Road, Dublin
Attendance: 41,000
Referee: Paul Honiss (New Zealand)

Ireland	South Africa

FB	15	Girvan Dempsey
RW	14	Shane Horgan
OC	13	Brian O'Driscoll (c)
IC	12	Gordon D'Arcy
LW	11	Andrew Trimble	(substituted off) 67'
FH	10	Ronan O'Gara	(substituted off) 79'
SH	9	Peter Stringer	(substituted off) 75'
N8	8	Denis Leamy
OF	7	David Wallace
BF	6	Neil Best	(substituted off) 61'
RL	5	Paul O'Connell	(substituted off) 79'
LL	4	Donncha O'Callaghan
TP	3	John Hayes
HK	2	Rory Best	(substituted off) 79'
LP	1	Marcus Horan	(substituted off) 67'
Replacements:
HK	16	Frankie Sheahan	(substituted in) 79'
PR	17	Bryan Young	(substituted in) 67'
LK	18	Malcolm O'Kelly	(substituted in) 79'
FL	19	Simon Easterby	(substituted in) 61'
SH	20	Isaac Boss	(substituted in) 75'
FH	21	Paddy Wallace	(substituted in) 79'
WG	22	Geordan Murphy	(substituted in) 67'
Coach:
(Ireland) Eddie O'Sullivan

FB	15	Bevin Fortuin
RW	14	Jaco Pretorius		(substituted off) 75'
OC	13	Bryan Habana
IC	12	Jean de Villiers
LW	11	François Steyn
FH	10	André Pretorius
SH	9	Ricky Januarie	4' to 9'
N8	8	Pierre Spies
OF	7	Juan Smith
BF	6	Danie Rossouw		(substituted off) 67'
RL	5	Albert van den Berg
LL	4	Johan Ackermann		(substituted off) 14'
TP	3	CJ van der Linde
HK	2	John Smit (c)
LP	1	Lawrence Sephaka		(substituted off) 40'
Replacements:
HK	16	Chiliboy Ralepelle
PR	17	BJ Botha		(substituted in) 40'
LK	18	Johann Muller		(substituted in) 14'
N8	19	Jacques Cronjé		(substituted in) 67'
FH	20	Ruan Pienaar		(substituted in) 4'	(substituted off) 9'
CE	21	Wynand Olivier		(substituted in) 75'
FB	22	JP Pietersen
Coach:
Jake White

=== Second test with England ===
Next up was a two test encounter against England at fortress Twickenham. The Springboks had not beaten England since the Spring Tour of 2000 where the Boks won 18–13. England exacted revenge a week later and had built a period of dominance spanning six years. Even more disconcerting was that the Boks had not won at Twickenham since 1997; this leaving the Boks with a nine-year hoodoo to break. The Boks dominated England for much of the first test and seemed certain of victory until a late try by Phil Vickery gave England the result. A key turning point in the game was the injury to Butch James. His replacement, André Pretorius failed to deliver the steadiness Butch provided and missed an important penalty.

18 November 2006
14:30 GMT

England	23–21	South Africa
Try: Cueto; Vickery; Con: Goode (2); Pen: Hodgson (2); Goode	Report	Try: James; A. Ndungane; Con: James; Pen: James (2); Drop: F. Steyn

Twickenham Stadium, London
Attendance: 81,512
Referee: Steve Walsh (New Zealand)

England	South Africa

FB	15	Josh Lewsey
RW	14	Mark Cueto
OC	13	Mathew Tait
IC	12	Jamie Noon
LW	11	Ben Cohen
FH	10	Charlie Hodgson	(substituted off) 39'
SH	9	Peter Richards	(substituted off) 69'
N8	8	Martin Corry (c)
OF	7	Pat Sanderson	(substituted off) 57'
BF	6	Joe Worsley
RL	5	Ben Kay	(substituted off) 57'
LL	4	Tom Palmer
TP	3	Julian White
HK	2	George Chuter	(substituted off) 57'
LP	1	Andrew Sheridan	(substituted off) 49'
Replacements:
HK	16	Lee Mears	(substituted in) 57'
PR	17	Phil Vickery	(substituted in) 49'
LK	18	Chris Jones	(substituted in) 57'
FL	19	Lewis Moody	(substituted in) 57'
SH	20	Shaun Perry	(substituted in) 69'
FH	21	Andy Goode	(substituted in) 39'
FB	22	Toby Flood
Coach:
Andy Robinson

FB	15	François Steyn
RW	14	Akona Ndungane
OC	13	Wynand Olivier
IC	12	Jean de Villiers
LW	11	Bryan Habana
FH	10	Butch James	(substituted off) 57'
SH	9	Ricky Januarie	(substituted off) 74'
N8	8	Jacques Cronjé	(substituted off) 40'
OF	7	Danie Rossouw
BF	6	Pierre Spies
RL	5	Johann Muller
LL	4	Johan Ackermann	(substituted off) 77'
TP	3	BJ Botha
HK	2	John Smit (c)
LP	1	CJ van der Linde	(substituted off) 69'
Replacements:
HK	16	Chiliboy Ralepelle
PR	17	Deon Carstens	(substituted in) 69'
LK	18	Albert van den Berg	(substituted in) 77'
N8	19	Hilton Lobberts	(substituted in) 40'
SH	20	Ruan Pienaar	(substituted in) 74'
FH	21	André Pretorius	(substituted in) 57'
FB	22	Bevin Fortuin
Coach:
Jake White

=== The revenge with England ===
The final analysis was that this was a year of growth as much as it was a disappointing lost opportunity. Injuries to Schalk Burger (broken neck), Bakkies Botha (calf surgery), Jean De Villiers (cracked rib), Bryan Habana (cracked rib), Butch James (groin and knee), André Pretorius (groin), Joe Van Niekerk (C5 & C6 vertebrae), Jacques Cronje (cracked rib), Danie Rossouw (hamstring), Juan Smith (left quadriceps), Eddie Andrews (back), BJ Botha (back surgery), CJ Van Der Linde (Leg), Gurthro Steenkamp (broken hand), Pedrie Wannenburg (wrist surgery), Marius Joubert (fractured hand) amongst other lesser injuries stretched the Bok's depth to its limit. The blessing was that it allowed the Boks to break their reliance on certain individuals and expand their depth in blooding new players and testing new combinations. Francois Steyn was undoubtedly the find of the season alongside the elusive Ruan Pienaar. Jake also found depth in Wynand Olivier and Pierre Spies; the former being used extensively in plugging gaps left by injuries in the backline. Jake lamented the many lost opportunities of this campaign but was optimistic about the various changes they made to their defensive patterns and saw it as an important learning cuve ahead of the World Cup the following year

25 November 2006

England	14–25	South Africa
Try: Cueto; Pen: Goode 3		Try: van der Linde; Con: A. Pretorius; Pen: A. Pretorius 2 Drop: A. Pretorius 4

Twickenham, London
Attendance: 82,000
Referee: Daniel Lewis (Ireland)

FB	15	Josh Lewsey
RW	14	Mark Cueto
OC	13	Mathew Tait
IC	12	Jamie Noon
LW	11	Ben Cohen
FH	10	Andy Goode
SH	9	Peter Richards
N8	8	Martin Corry (c)
OF	7	Pat Sanderson
BF	6	Joe Worsley
RL	5	Chris Jones
LL	4	Tom Palmer
TP	3	Julian White
HK	2	Lee Mears
LP	1	Phil Vickery
Replacements:
H	16	George Chuter	(substituted in) '
	17	Tim Payne
L	18	Ben Kay	(substituted in) '
F	19	Lewis Moody	(substituted in) '
SH	20	Shaun Perry	(substituted in) '
FH	21	Toby Flood	(substituted in) '
	22	Mark van Gisbergen
Coach:
Andy Robinson

FB	15	Frans Steyn
RW	14	Akona Ndungane
OC	13	Wynand Olivier
IC	12	Jean de Villiers
LW	11	Bryan Habana
FH	10	André Pretorius
SH	9	Ricky Januarie
N8	8	Danie Rossouw
OF	7	Juan Smith
BF	6	Kabamba Floors
RL	5	Johann Muller
LL	4	Johan Ackermann
TP	3	BJ Botha
HK	2	John Smit (c)
LP	1	CJ van der Linde
Replacements:
F	16	Chiliboy Ralepelle
P	17	Deon Carstens	(substituted in) '
F	18	Albert van den Berg	(substituted in) '
F	19	Gerrie Britz	(substituted in) '
	20	Ruan Pienaar	(substituted in) '
	21	Jaco Pretorius
	22	Bevin Fortuin
Coach:
John Smit

=== The final match against World XV ===
3 December 2006

World XV	7–32	South Africa XV

Welford Road Stadium, Leicester
