= 2004 England rugby union tour of Australasia =

Summary
P	W	D	L
Total
3	0	0	3
Test match
3	0	0	3
Opponent
P	W	D	L
New Zealand
2	0	0	2
Australia
1	0	0	1

Tour chronology
- ← Southern Hemisphere 2003 Australia 2006 →

The 2004 England rugby union tour of Australia and New Zealand was a series of matches played in June 2004 in Australia and New Zealand by the England national rugby union team. It was the first tour of England, after the victory in the 2003 Rugby World Cup. The English team lost all three Tests decisively, a shock result after the World Cup victory the year before.

== Matches ==
12 June 2004

New Zealand	36–3	England
Try: Howlett, Rokocoko; Spencer; Con: Carter 3 Pen: Carter 5		Pen: Hodgson

Carisbrook, Dunedin
Attendance: 36,000
Referee: Jonathan Kaplan (South Africa)

New Zealand: 15. Mils Muliaina, 14. Doug Howlett, 13. Tana Umaga (capt.), 12. Dan Carter, 11. Joe Rokocoko, 10. Carlos Spencer, 9. Justin Marshall, 8. Xavier Rush, 7. Richie McCaw, 6. Jono Gibbes, 5. Keith Robinson, 4. Chris Jack, 3. Carl Hayman, 2. Keven Mealamu, 1. Kees Meeuws, – replacements: 16. Andrew Hore, 17. Tony Woodcock, 19. Marty Holah, 21. Nick Evans, 22. Sam Tuitupou – No entry : 18. Jerry Collins, 20. Byron Kelleher
England: 15. Josh Lewsey, 14. James Simpson-Daniel, 13. Mike Tindall, 12. Mike Catt, 11. Ben Cohen, 10. Charlie Hodgson, 9. Matt Dawson, 8. Lawrence Dallaglio (capt.), 7. Richard Hill, 6. Chris Jones, 5. Danny Grewcock, 4. Simon Shaw, 3. Julian White, 2. Steve Thompson, 1. Trevor Woodman, – replacements: 16. Mark Regan, 17. Matt Stevens, 18. Steve Borthwick, 19. Joe Worsley, 20. Andy Gomarsall, 21. Stuart Abbott – No entry: 22. Olly Barkley

19 June 2004

New Zealand	36–12	England
Try: Carter, Rokocoko 3 Spencer; Con: Carter 4 Pen: Carter		Pen: Hodgson 4

Eden Park, Auckland
Attendance: 49,000
Referee: Nigel Williams (Wales)

New Zealand: 15. Nick Evans, 14. Mils Muliaina, 13. Tana Umaga (capt.), 12. Dan Carter, 11. Joe Rokocoko, 10. Carlos Spencer, 9. Justin Marshall, 8. Xavier Rush, 7.Marty Holah (yellow card) , 6. Jono Gibbes, 5.Keith Robinson, 4. Chris Jack, 3. Carl Hayman, 2. Keven Mealamu, 1. Kees Meeuws, – replacements: 16. Andrew Hore, 17. Tony Woodcock, 18. Jerry Collins, 19. Craig Newby, 21. Andrew Mehrtens, 22. Sam Tuitupou – No entry : 20. Byron Kelleher
England: 15. Josh Lewsey, 14. Tom Voyce, 13. Stuart Abbott, 12.Mike Tindall, 11. Ben Cohen, 10. Charlie Hodgson, 9.Andy Gomarsall, 8. Lawrence Dallaglio (capt.), 7. Richard Hill, 6. Joe Worsley, 5. Steve Borthwick, 4. Simon Shaw (red card) , 3. Julian White, 2. Mark Regan, 1. Trevor Woodman, – replacements: 16. Andy Titterrell, 17. Matt Stevens, 18. Danny Grewcock, 19. Michael Lipman, 20. Matt Dawson, 21. Olly Barkley, 22. Fraser Waters

26 June 2004

Australia	51–15	England
Try: Paul 2, Rathbone 3 Tuqiri; Con: Roff 3 Pen: Roff 5		Try: Dallaglio, Hill; Con: Hodgson; Pen: Hodgson

Suncorp Stadium, Brisbane
Attendance: 52,492
Referee: PaddyO'Brien (New Zealand)

Australia: 15. Joe Roff, 14. Clyde Rathbone, 13. Stirling Mortlock, 12. Matt Giteau, 11. Lote Tuqiri, 10. Stephen Larkham, 9. George Gregan (capt), 8. David Lyons, 7. Phil Waugh, 6. Radike Samo, 5. Nathan Sharpe, 4. Justin Harrison, 3. Al Baxter, 2. Brendan Cannon, 1. Bill Young, – replacements: 16. Jeremy Paul, 17. Matt Dunning, 18. Dan Vickerman, 19. George Smith, 20. Matt Henjak, 21. John Roe, 22. Chris Latham
England: 15. Josh Lewsey, 14. Tom Voyce, 13. Mike Catt, 12. Mike Tindall, 11. Ben Cohen, 10. Charlie Hodgson, 9. Andy Gomarsall, 8. Lawrence Dallaglio (capt.), 7. Richard Hill, 6. Joe Worsley, 5. Steve Borthwick, 4. Simon Shaw, 3. Julian White, 2. Mark Regan, 1. Tim Payne, – replacements: 16. Steve Thompson, 17. Mike Worsley, 18. Martin Corry, 19. Michael Lipman, 20. Matt Dawson, 21. Fraser Waters, 22. Olly Barkley
