= 2007 Rugby World Cup final =

Rugby competition in Paris, France

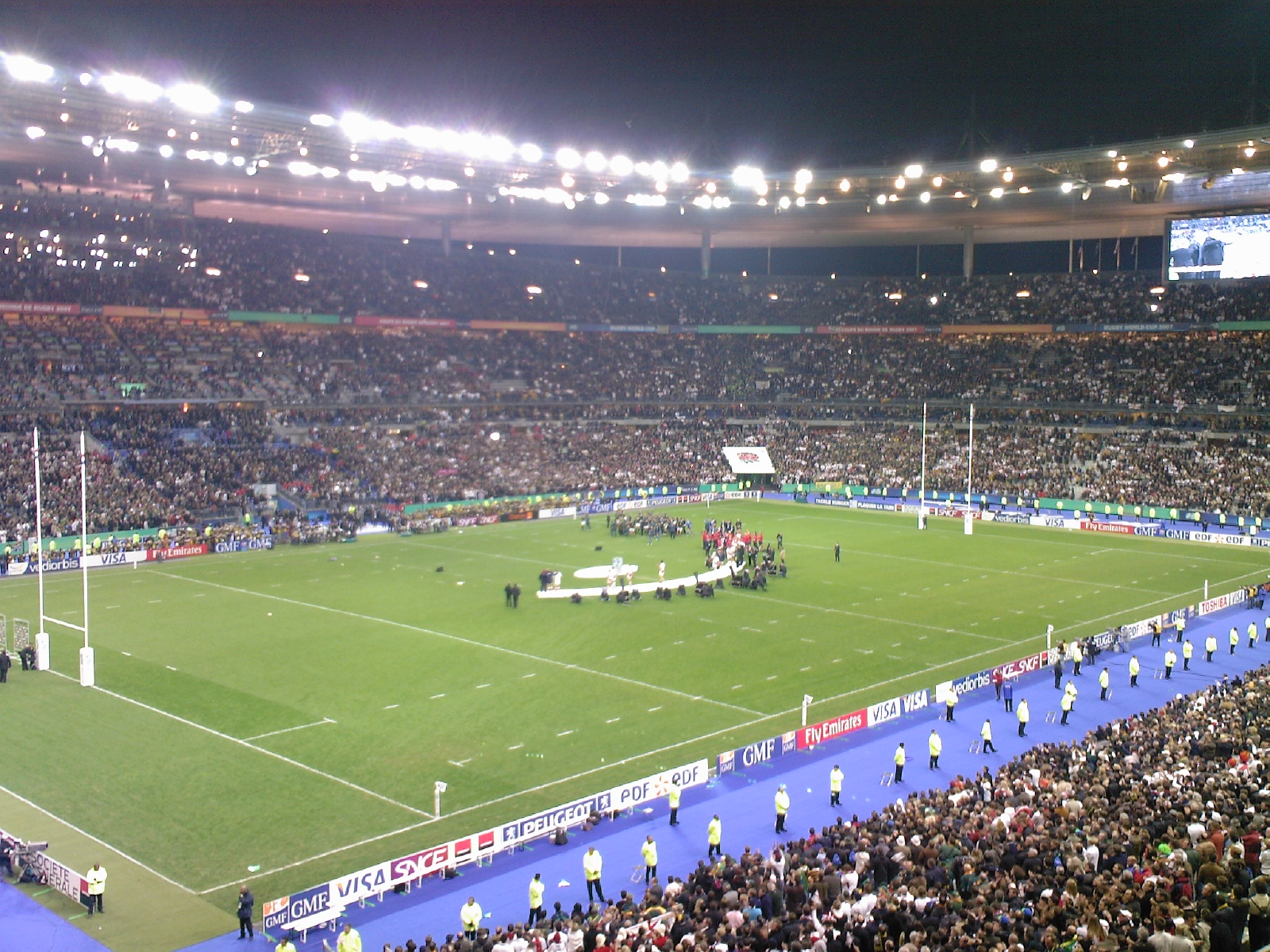
- The medal ceremony
- Event: 2007 Rugby World Cup
England	South Africa
6	15
- Date: 20 October 2007
- Venue: Stade de France, Saint-Denis
- Man of the Match: Victor Matfield (South Africa)
- Referee: Alain Rolland (Ireland)
- Attendance: 80,430

The 2007 Rugby World Cup final was a rugby union match, played on Saturday, 20 October 2007 at the Stade de France, Saint-Denis, Paris, to determine the winner of the 2007 Rugby World Cup. South Africa beat England 15–6. Having also won the 1995 tournament, South Africa became the second country to win two World Cups.

England and South Africa, who won their semi-finals against France and Argentina respectively, had met during the pool stage of the competition, when South Africa won 36–0. South Africa began the final undefeated in the competition. The final was refereed by Irish referee Alain Rolland.

Neither team scored a try in the final. South Africa scored five penalties – four by fullback Percy Montgomery and one by centre François Steyn – and England two penalties, both by fly-half Jonny Wilkinson. Each team had one major try-scoring opportunity; South Africa's came late in the first half, while England's came early in the second. England wing Mark Cueto had a try disallowed in the 42nd minute after he was ruled to have put a foot in touch during a tackle by Danie Rossouw before grounding the ball.

== Path to the final ==
Both England and South Africa were placed in Pool A along with Samoa, Tonga and the United States. England's first match was against the United States, whom they beat 28–10. South Africa opened their campaign with a 59–7 victory over Samoa in which they scored seven tries, four of them by Bryan Habana. The two teams then met in their second match of the tournament. For the first time in their World Cup history, England were kept pointless as South Africa scored three tries to win 36–0. South Africa then rested several of their top players for their match against Tonga. Tonga came close to an upset but South Africa held on to win 30–25, guaranteeing the Springboks top position in the pool. England then played Samoa, winning 44–22, before facing Tonga in a match effectively serving as a qualification play-off; whoever won the game would finish second in the pool behind South Africa. England eventually won 36–20, scoring four tries in the process.

England played Australia, who had finished top of Pool B, in their quarter-final. The match was a repeat of the 2003 World Cup final, with England coming out on top again, beating the Wallabies 12–10. All of England's points were scored by Jonny Wilkinson penalties. South Africa faced Fiji, who had defeated Wales to finish as runners-up behind Australia in Pool B. South Africa scored five tries to two and won 37–20. England played hosts France in their semi-final. Despite having less possession and territory England won 14–9. South Africa faced Argentina and scored four tries to one to win 37–13.

== Match ==
=== Summary ===
==== First half ====
England had the first line-out throw of the game but South Africa stole the ball. In the sixth minute, Mathew Tait attempted to run the ball from inside England's 22-metre line, only to be tackled and penalised for not releasing the ball in the ruck. South Africa's Percy Montgomery successfully converted the penalty to give the Springboks a 3–0 lead.

An up-and-under kick from England resulted in South Africa wing JP Pietersen dropping the ball. England regained possession and passed the ball out to winger Paul Sackey, before South Africa were penalised for killing the ball. Wilkinson converted the penalty and levelled the scores at 3–3 after ten minutes. After a lot of kicking from both sides, Butch James was tripped by England flanker Lewis Moody as he was chasing a kick. Montgomery kicked the resulting penalty, to put the South Africans 6–3 up after 15 minutes. Two minutes later, England positioned themselves for an attempted drop-goal, but Wilkinson's attempt was left wanting as it drifted slightly wide.

After 21 minutes, England prop and captain Phil Vickery was penalised for being offside near the halfway line. The resulting penalty kick was taken by South Africa's centre Frans Steyn, but he missed the long-range effort. The match continued with large amounts of kicking from both sides until the 35th minute, when Steyn broke through the England line. South Africa managed to retain possession and eventually their hooker, John Smit, went for the try-line but was held up two metres short. The ball was eventually knocked on by South Africa and England were awarded a five-metre scrum. The scrum had to be reset several times, but the Springbok forwards were finally able to wheel the scrum through 90 degrees to force the turnover. They won the scrum on their own feed and continued to press at England's goal line before England were penalised for killing the ball. A penalty was awarded, which Montgomery kicked to give South Africa a 9–3 half-time lead.

==== Second half ====
Mathew Tait was able to break the South African defensive line, before being tackled metres short of the South African goal line. The ball was recycled and spread left to England winger Mark Cueto, who dived for the try line while being tackled by South African number eight Danie Rossouw. Referee Alain Rolland referred the decision to Australian Television Match Official Stuart Dickinson to determine whether Cueto was in touch before grounding the ball. Dickinson ruled that a foot was in touch and Rolland brought play back to an earlier penalty against Schalk Burger. Wilkinson converted the penalty to reduce South Africa's lead to 9–6 after 42 minutes.

In the 48th minute, Steyn made another break for South Africa and England flanker Martin Corry was penalised for playing the ball off his feet. Montgomery kicked the penalty to restore South Africa's six-point advantage. England penetrated South Africa's 22 in the 58th minute and their scrum-half Andy Gomarsall chipped the ball ahead for Toby Flood to run on to. However, the kick was too deep and was shepherded over the dead ball line by Percy Montgomery. Unable to reach the ball, and trying to force an English five-metre scrum, Flood pushed Montgomery in the back as they both chased for the ball, sending Montgomery into the advertising boards. In his attempt to hurdle the boards, Montgomery collided with a television camera, but referee Rolland decided not to penalise Flood. Three minutes later, just inside England's half, the English were penalised for obstruction, and Steyn kicked a 49-metre penalty to extend South Africa's lead to 15–6.

In the 67th minute, South African captain John Smit was penalised for a collision with Mark Cueto as Cueto chased his own kick. Wilkinson kicked the ball into touch in South Africa's 22 from his own half, but England lost their resulting line-out to give South Africa possession. Requiring at least two scores to overhaul South Africa's lead, England kept attacking, and Wilkinson attempted a long-range drop goal in the 71st minute but was unsuccessful.

England kept possession for long periods during the last ten minutes, but were unable to break through the South African defence. They were penalised in the 75th minute for holding on in the tackle, and South Africa continued to try to play the match in England territory. England then knocked the ball on in the 79th minute, giving South Africa a scrum. The South African forwards secured the ball, and as soon as the clock ticked over the 80-minute mark, the ball was kicked into touch. Referee Rolland then blew the final whistle, and South Africa had won their second World Cup title. This was also the second World Cup title for retiring prop Os du Randt, who was the last player from the Springboks' 1995 winning team still active; he joined five Australia players as the only players to have won two World Cups.

== Details ==
20 October 2007
21:00 UTC+2

England	6–15	South Africa
Pen: Wilkinson (2/2) 13', 44'	Report	Pen: Montgomery (4/4) 7', 16', 40', 51'; Steyn (1/2) 62'

Stade de France, Saint-Denis
Attendance: 80,430
Referee: Alain Rolland (Ireland)

England	South Africa

FB	15	Jason Robinson	(substituted off) 47'
RW	14	Paul Sackey
OC	13	Mathew Tait
IC	12	Mike Catt	(substituted off) 51'
LW	11	Mark Cueto
FH	10	Jonny Wilkinson
SH	9	Andy Gomarsall
N8	8	Nick Easter	(substituted off) 65'
OF	7	Lewis Moody	(substituted off) 63'
BF	6	Martin Corry
RL	5	Ben Kay
LL	4	Simon Shaw
TP	3	Phil Vickery (c)	(substituted off) 41'
HK	2	Mark Regan	(substituted off) 63'
LP	1	Andrew Sheridan
Replacements:
HK	16	George Chuter	(substituted on) 63'
PR	17	Matt Stevens	(substituted on) 41'
N8	18	Lawrence Dallaglio	(substituted on) 65'
FL	19	Joe Worsley	(substituted on) 63'	(substituted off) 71'
SH	20	Peter Richards		(substituted on) 71'
FH	21	Toby Flood	(substituted on) 51'
CE	22	Dan Hipkiss	(substituted on) 47'
Coach:
(England) Brian Ashton

FB	15	Percy Montgomery
RW	14	JP Pietersen
OC	13	Jaque Fourie
IC	12	François Steyn
LW	11	Bryan Habana
FH	10	Butch James
SH	9	Fourie du Preez
N8	8	Danie Rossouw	(substituted off) 72'
BF	7	Juan Smith
OF	6	Schalk Burger
RL	5	Victor Matfield
LL	4	Bakkies Botha
TP	3	CJ van der Linde
HK	2	John Smit (c)	72' to 77'
LP	1	Os du Randt
Replacements:
HK	16	Bismarck du Plessis	(substituted on) 72'	(substituted off) 77'
PR	17	Jannie du Plessis
LK	18	Johann Muller
FL	19	Wikus van Heerden	(substituted on) 72'
SH	20	Ruan Pienaar
FH	21	André Pretorius
CE	22	Wynand Olivier
Coach:
(South Africa) Jake White

Man of the Match:
Victor Matfield (South Africa)

Touch judges:
Joël Jutge (France)
Paul Honiss (New Zealand)
Television match official:
Stuart Dickinson (Australia)
Fourth official:
Alan Lewis (Ireland)
Fifth official:
Steve Walsh (New Zealand)

== Statistics ==
Statistic	England	South Africa
Tries	0	0
Conversions	0	0
Penalties (attempts)	2/2	5/6
Drop goals (attempts)	0/2	0/0
Scrums (won/lost)	5/1	9/0
Line-outs (won/lost)	19/7	13/0
Turnovers	4	4
Tackles (made/attempts)	77/88	81/97
Line breaks	1	1
Possession	55%	45%
Territory	57%	43%
Time in opp. 22	6' 48"	3' 22"
Errors (hands/kicks/restart)	10 (10/0/0)	8 (6/2/0)
Possession kicked (in play/touch/errors)	44 (34/10/0)	48 (28/18/2)
Penalties conceded	7	5
Replacements	7	3
Yellow cards	0	0
Red cards	0	0

== See also ==
- List of Rugby World Cup finals
