= 2008 England rugby union tour of New Zealand =

Summary
| P | W | D | L |
Total
| 2 | 0 | 0 | 2 |
Test match
| 2 | 0 | 0 | 2 |
Opponent
| P | W | D | L |
New Zealand
| 2 | 0 | 0 | 2 |

The 2008 England rugby union tour of New Zealand was a series of matches played in June 2008 in New Zealand by England national rugby union team.

== Results ==
14 June 2008

| New Zealand | 37–20 | England |
| Try: Carter, Muliaina; Sivivatu, Smith; Con: Carter 4 Pen: Carter 3 | report | Try: Ojo 2 Con: Barkley 2 Pen: Barkley 2 |

Eden Park, Auckland
Attendance: 44,000
Referee: Nigel Owens (Wales)

| New Zealand | | | England |
| (substituted off) 52' Mils Muliaina | FB | 15 | FB | Mike Brown |
| Anthony Tuitavake | W | 14 | W | Topsy Ojo |
| Conrad Smith | C | 13 | C | Mike Tindall (yellow card) 78' to 80' |
| Ma'a Nonu | C | 12 | C | Olly Barkley |
| Sitiveni Sivivatu | W | 11 | W | David Strettle |
| (substituted off) 70' Dan Carter | FH | 10 | FH | Charlie Hodgson (substituted off) 50' |
| (substituted off) 60' Andrew Ellis | SH | 9 | SH | Richard Wigglesworth (substituted off) 62' |
| (substituted off) 53' Jerome Kaino | N8 | 8 | N8 | Luke Narraway |
| (capt.) Richie McCaw | F | 7 | F | Tom Rees |
| Rodney So'oialo | F | 6 | F | James Haskell (substituted off) 62' |
| Ali Williams | L | 5 | L | Steve Borthwick (capt.) |
| (substituted off) 52' Brad Thorn | L | 4 | L | Tom Palmer (substituted off) 54' |
| Greg Somerville | P | 3 | P | Matt Stevens |
| (substituted off) 50' Andrew Hore | H | 2 | H | Lee Mears (substituted off) 77' |
| Neemia Tialata | P | 1 | P | Andrew Sheridan (yellow card) 34' to 44' (substituted off) 64' |
| | | Replacements |
| (substituted on) 50' Keven Mealamu | H | 16 | H | David Paice (substituted on) 77' |
| John Schwalger | | 17 | P | Tim Payne (substituted on) 64' |
| (substituted on) 52' Anthony Boric | L | 18 | L | Ben Kay (substituted on) 54' |
| (substituted on) 53' Sione Lauaki | N8 | 19 | F | Joe Worsley (substituted on) 62' |
| (substituted on) 60' Jimmy Cowan | SH | 20 | SH | Danny Care (substituted on) 62' |
| (substituted on) 70' Stephen Donald | FH | 21 | FH | Jamie Noon (substituted on) 50' |
| (substituted on) 52' Leon MacDonald | FB | 22 | | Mathew Tait |
| | | Coaches |
| (New Zealand) Graham Henry | | | | Rob Andrew (England) |

21 June 2008

| New Zealand | 44–12 | England |
| Try: Kahui 12', Carter 28'; Nonu 52', Lauaki 61'; Cowan 80'; Con: Carter 12' 28' 52' 62'; Donald 80'; Pen: Carter 1' 23/ 44' | report | Try: Care 48', Varndell 66'; Con: Barkley 49' |

Lancaster Park, Christchurch
Attendance: 26,000
Referee: Jonathan Kaplan (South Africa)

| New Zealand | | | England |
| Leon MacDonald | FB | 15 | FB | Mathew Tait (substituted off) 73' |
| Sitiveni Sivivatu | W | 14 | W | Topsy Ojo |
| 72' to 74' Richard Kahui | C | 13 | C | Mike Tindall (yellow card) 61' to 71' |
| Ma'a Nonu | C | 12 | C | Jamie Noon |
| Rudi Wulf | W | 11 | W | Tom Varndell |
| (substituted off) 73' Dan Carter | FH | 10 | FH | Toby Flood (substituted off) 29' |
| (substituted off) 68' Andy Ellis | SH | 9 | SH | Danny Care |
| Rodney So'oialo | N8 | 8 | N8 | Luke Narraway (substituted off) 57' |
| (substituted off) 27' (capt.) Richie McCaw | F | 7 | F | Tom Rees (substituted off) 53' |
| Adam Thomson | F | 6 | F | James Haskell |
| (substituted off) 15' Ali Williams | L | 5 | L | Steve Borthwick (capt.) |
| Brad Thorn | L | 4 | L | Tom Palmer (substituted off) 68' |
| Greg Somerville | P | 3 | P | Matt Stevens (substituted off) 72' |
| 34' to 50' Andrew Hore | H | 2 | H | Lee Mears (substituted off) 75' |
| (substituted off) 41' Neemia Tialata | P | 1 | P | Tim Payne |
| | | Replacements |
| (substituted on) (substituted off) 34'-50' Keven Mealamu | H | 16 | H | David Paice (substituted on) 75' |
| (substituted on) 41' Tony Woodcock | P | 17 | P | Jason Hobson (substituted on) 72' |
| (substituted on) 15' Anthony Boric | L | 18 | L | Ben Kay (substituted on) 68' |
| (substituted on) 27' Sione Lauaki | F | 19 | F | Joe Worsley (substituted on) 53' |
| (substituted on) 68' Jimmy Cowan | SH | 20 | N8 | Tom Croft (substituted on) 57' |
| (substituted on) 73' Stephen Donald | FH | 21 | FB | Peter Richards (substituted on) 73' |
| (substituted on) (substituted off) 72'-74' Mils Muliaina | C | 22 | FH | Olly Barkley (substituted on) 29' |
| | | Coaches |
| (New Zealand) Graham Henry | | | | Rob Andrew (England) |
