= 2008 South Africa rugby union tour of Europe =

Summary
P	W	D	L
Total
3	3	0	0
Test match
3	3	0	0
Opponent
P	W	D	L
Wales
1	1	0	0
Scotland
1	1	0	0
England
1	1	0	0

The 2008 South Africa rugby union tour of Europe was a series of matches played in November 2008 in Great Britain by South Africa national rugby union team.

== Results ==
8 November 2008

Wales	15–20	South Africa
Pen: Halfpenny 28', Hook 56', 58', 62', 72'	report	Try: Jacobs 5', de Villiers 52'; Con: Pienaar 6', 52'; Pen: Pienaar 8', 35'

Millennium, Cardiff
Attendance: 74,000
Referee: A. Rolland (Ireland)

Wales			South Africa
Lee Byrne	FB	15	FB	Conrad Jantjes
Leigh Halfpenny	W	14	W	JP Pietersen
Tom Shanklin	C	13	C	Adrian Jacobs (substituted off) 59'
Jamie Roberts	C	12	C	Jean de Villiers (substituted off) 60'
(substituted off) 51' Shane Williams	W	11	W	Bryan Habana
Stephen Jones	FH	10	FH	Ruan Pienaar
(substituted off) 51' Gareth Cooper	SH	9	SH	Fourie du Preez (substituted off) 60'
Andy Powell	N8	8	N8	Pierre Spies (substituted off) 50'
Martyn Williams	F	7	F	Juan Smith 67' to 74'
(capt.) Ryan Jones	F	6	F	Schalk Burger
(substituted off) 65' Ian Evans	L	5	L	Victor Matfield
Alun Wyn Jones	L	4	L	Bakkies Botha (substituted off) 41'
Adam Jones	P	3	P	John Smit (capt.)
Matthew Rees	H	2	H	Bismarck du Plessis
Gethin Jenkins	P	1	P	Tendai Mtawarira
		Replacements
Richard Hibbard		16	P	Brian Mujati (substituted on) (substituted off) 67'-74'
Duncan Jones		17	P	Gurthro Steenkamp
(substituted on) 65' Ian Gough	L	18	L	Andries Bekker (substituted on) 41'
Dafydd Jones		19	N8	Ryan Kankowski (substituted on) 50'
(substituted on) 51' Dwayne Peel	SH	20	SH	Ricky Januarie (substituted on) 60'
(substituted on) 51' James Hook	FH	21	C	Frans Steyn (substituted on) 59'
Andrew Bishop		22	C	Jaque Fourie (yellow card) 61' to 71' (substituted on) 60'
		Coaches
(New Zealand) Warren Gatland				Peter de Villiers (South Africa)

15 November 2008

Scotland	10–14	South Africa
Try: Hines 38'; Con: Godman 39'; Pen: Doman 27'	report	Try: Fourie 58'; Pen: Pienaar 45', 54', 65'

Murrayfield, Edinburgh
Attendance: 55,000
Referee: Dave Pearson (England)

Scotland			South Africa
(substituted off) 10' Chris Paterson	FB	15	FB	Conrad Jantjes
(substituted off) 73' Thom Evans	W	14	W	JP Pietersen
Ben Cairns	C	13	C	Adrian Jacobs
Nick de Luca	C	12	C	Jean de Villiers (substituted off) 65'
Rory Lamont	W	11	W	Bryan Habana (substituted off) 53'
10' to 20' (substituted off) 40' Phil Godman	FH	10	FH	Ruan Pienaar
(capt.) Mike Blair	SH	9	SH	Ricky Januarie
Ally Hogg	N8	8	N8	Pierre Spies (substituted off) 76'
John Barclay	F	7	F	Juan Smith
(substituted off) 58' Jason White	F	6	F	Schalk Burger (substituted off) 74'
Jim Hamilton	L	5	L	Victor Matfield
(substituted off) 74' Nathan Hines	L	4	L	Bakkies Botha (substituted off) 61'
Euan Murray	P	3	P	John Smit (capt.)
(substituted off) 79' Ross Ford	H	2	H	Bismarck du Plessis (substituted off) 4'
(substituted off) 64' Allan Jacobsen	P	1	P	Tendai Mtawarira (substituted off) 75'
		Replacements
(substituted on) 79' Dougie Hall	H	16	H	Brian Mujati (substituted on) 4'
(substituted on) 64' Alasdair Dickinson	P	17	P	Gurthro Steenkamp (substituted on) 75'
(substituted on) 74' Matt Mustchin	L	18	L	Andries Bekker (substituted on) 61'
(substituted on) 58' Scott Gray	F	19	F	Ryan Kankowski (substituted on) 74'
(substituted on) 73' Rory Lawson	W	20	N8	Danie Rossouw (substituted on) 76'
(substituted on) (substituted off) 10'-20' (substituted on) 40' Dan Parks	FH	21	C	Frans Steyn (substituted on) 65'
(substituted on) 10' Hugo Southwell	FB	22	W	Jaque Fourie (substituted on) 53'
		Coaches
(Scotland) Frank Hadden				Peter de Villiers (South Africa)

22 November 2008

England	6–42	South Africa
Pen: Cipriani 1' 27'	report	Try: Rossouw 14', Pienaar 18'; Jacobs 50', Fourie 77'; Habana 80'; Con: Pienaar 15' 18' 51', Steyn 78'; Pen: Pens Pienaar 5', 24', 62'

Twickenham, London
Attendance: 81,000
Referee: Nigel Owens (Wales)

England			South Africa
Delon Armitage	FB	15	FB	Conrad Jantjes (yellow card) 64' to 74'
Paul Sackey	W	14	W	JP Pietersen
Jamie Noon	C	13	C	Adrian Jacobs (substituted off) 58'
(substituted off) 29' Riki Flutey	C	12	C	Jean de Villiers
Ugo Monye	W	11	W	Bryan Habana
Danny Cipriani	FH	10	FH	Ruan Pienaar (substituted off) 63'
(substituted off) 73' Danny Care	SH	9	SH	Ricky Januarie
(substituted off) 68' Nick Easter	N8	8	N8	Pierre Spies (substituted off) 75'
Tom Rees	F	7	F	Danie Rossouw (substituted off) 33'- (substituted on) 39' (substituted off) 58'
James Haskell	F	6	F	Schalk Burger
(substituted off) 31' Tom Palmer	L	5	L	Victor Matfield
(capt.) Steve Borthwick	L	4	L	Bakkies Botha (substituted off) 63'
(substituted off) 55' Phil Vickery	P	3	P	Jannie du Plessis (substituted off) 68'
(substituted off) 58' Lee Mears	H	2	H	John Smit (capt.) (substituted off) 75'
Tim Payne	P	1	P	Tendai Mtawarira (yellow card) 29' to 39'
		Replacements
(substituted on) 58' Dylan Hartley	H	16	P	Chiliboy Ralepelle (substituted on) (substituted off) 33'-39' (substituted on) 75'
(substituted on) 55' Matt Stevens	P	17	P	Brian Mujati (substituted on) 68'
(substituted on) 31' Simon Shaw	L	18	L	Andries Bekker (substituted on) 63'
Tom Croft	F	19	F	Ryan Kankowski (substituted on) 58'
(substituted on) 68' Jordan Crane	N8	20	N8	Heinrich Brüssow (substituted on) 75'
(substituted on) 73' Harry Ellis	SH	21	FH	Frans Steyn (substituted on) 63'
(substituted on) 29' Toby Flood	C	22	C	Jaque Fourie (substituted on) 58'
		Coaches
(England) Martin Johnson				Peter de Villiers (South Africa)
