= 2006 England rugby union tour of Australia =

- Manager: Andy Robinson
- Tour captain: Pat Sanderson
Summary
P	W	D	L
Total
2	0	0	2
Test match
2	0	0	2
Opponent
P	W	D	L
Australia
2	0	0	2

Tour chronology
- ← Australasia 2004 South Africa 2007 →

The 2006 England rugby union tour of Australia was a series of matches played in June 2006 in Australia by England national rugby union team.

England lost both matches against "Wallabies".

== Touring party ==
- Manager: Andy Robinson
- Captain: Pat Sanderson

=== Backs ===
I Balshaw (Gloucester), M Van Gisbergen (Wasps), J Simpson-Daniel (Gloucester), T Varndell (Leicester), T Voyce (Wasps), J Noon (Newcastle), M Tait (Newcastle), S Abbott (Wasps), M Catt (London Irish), O Barkley (Bath), A Goode (Leicester), S Bemand (Leicester), P Richards (Gloucester), N Walshe (Bath).

=== Forwards ===
G Chuter (Leicester), L Mears (Bath), A Titterrell (Sale), T Payne (Wasps), G Rowntree (Leicester), Duncan Bell (Bath), J White (Leicester), A Brown (Gloucester), L Deacon (Leicester), C Jones (Sale), B Kay (Leicester), M Lipman (Bath), M Lund (Sale), L Moody (Leicester), P Sanderson (Worcester), J Worsley (Wasps).

Source: BBC

== Matches ==
11 June 2006

Australia	34–3	England
Try: Blake, Gerrard, Latham; Con: Mortlock 2 Pen: Mortlock 5		Pen: Barkley

Stadium Australia, Sydney
Attendance: 62,000
Referee: Alan Lewis (Ireland)

Australia: 15.Chris Latham, 14.Mark Gerrard, 13.Stirling Mortlock, 12.Mat Rogers, 11.Lote Tuqiri, 10.Stephen Larkham, 9.George Gregan (capt), 8.Rocky Elsom, 7.George Smith, 6.Daniel Heenan, 5.Dan Vickerman, 4.Nathan Sharpe, 3.Rodney Blake, 2.Tai McIsaac, 1.Greg Holmes, – replacements: 16.Jeremy Paul, 17.Al Baxter, 18.Mark Chisholm, 19.Phil Waugh, 20.Josh Valentine, 21.Clyde Rathbone, 22.Cameron Shepherd
England: 15.Iain Balshaw, 14.Tom Varndell, 13.Mathew Tait, 12.Mike Catt, 11.Tom Voyce, 10.Olly Barkley, 9.Peter Richards, 8.Pat Sanderson (capt.), 7.Lewis Moody, 6.Magnus Lund, 5.Alex Brown, 4.Louis Deacon, 3.Julian White, 2.Lee Mears, 1.Graham Rowntree, – replacements: 16.George Chuter, 17.Tim Payne, 18.Chris Jones, 19.Joe Worsley, 20.Nick Walshe, 21.Andy Goode, 22.Jamie Noon

17 June 2006

Australia	43–18	England
Try: Larkham, Smith, Tuqiri; Chisholm, Gerrard 2, Con: Mortlock 5 Pen: Mortlock		Try: Chuter, Varndell; Con: Goode; Pen: Goode; Drop: Goode

Melbourne
Attendance: 65,000
Referee: Steve Walsh (New Zealand)

Australia: 15.Chris Latham, 14.Mark Gerrard, 13.Stirling Mortlock (capt.), 12.Mat Rogers, 11.Lote Tuqiri, 10.Stephen Larkham, 9.Sam Cordingley, 8.Rocky Elsom, 7.George Smith, 6.Mark Chisholm, 5.Dan Vickerman, 4.Nathan Sharpe, 3.Rodney Blake, 2.Adam Freier, 1.Greg Holmes, – replacements: 16.Jeremy Paul, 17.Al Baxter, 18.Wycliff Palu, 19.Phil Waugh, 20.George Gregan, 21.Clyde Rathbone, 22.Cameron Shepherd
England: 15.Iain Balshaw, 14.Tom Varndell, 13.Jamie Noon, 12.Mike Catt, 11.Mathew Tait, 10.Andy Goode, 9.Peter Richards, 8.Pat Sanderson (capt.), 7.Michael Lipman, 6.Joe Worsley, 5.Ben Kay, 4.Chris Jones, 3.Julian White, 2.George Chuter, 1.Graham Rowntree, – replacements: 16.Lee Mears, 17.Tim Payne, 18.Louis Deacon, 19.Magnus Lund, 20.Nick Walshe, 21.Olly Barkley, 22.Stuart Abbott

== See also ==
- History of rugby union matches between Australia and England
