= Mark Cueto =

British Lions & England international rugby union footballers

Mark Cueto MBE
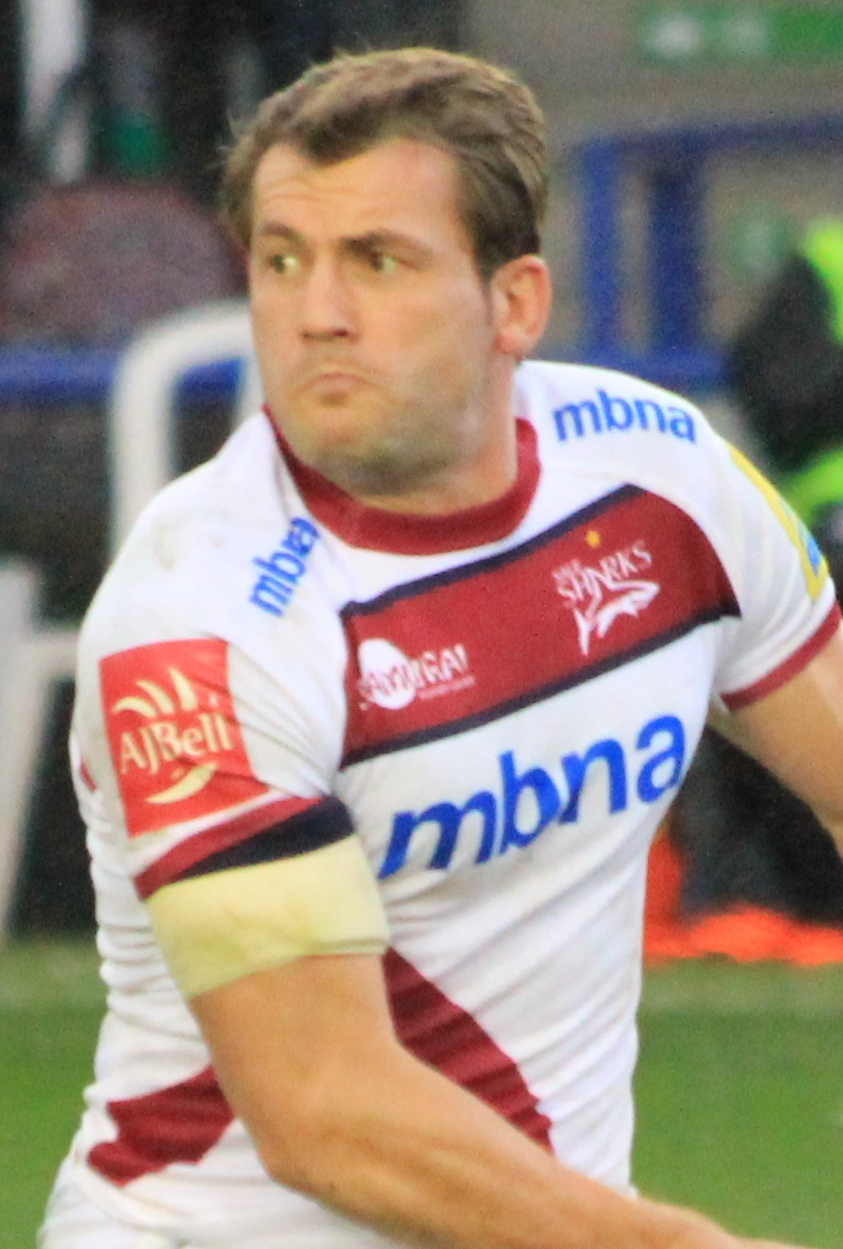
- Cueto in 2013
- Born: Mark John Cueto; 26 December 1979 (age 46) Workington, Cumbria, England
- Height: 6 ft 0 in (1.83 m)
- Weight: 15 st 0 lb (95 kg)
- School: St. Thomas More School; Alsager Comprehensive
- University: Manchester Metropolitan University

Rugby union career
- Position(s): Wing, Full-back
Amateur team(s)
Years	Team	Apps	(Points)
1996-1997	Crewe & Nantwich RUFC		
1997–1998	Sandbach RUFC		
1998–2001	Altrincham Kersal		
Senior career
Years	Team	Apps	(Points)
2001–2015	Sale Sharks	303	(590)
- Correct as of 27 March 2015
International career
Years	Team	Apps	(Points)
2002–2004	England A		
2004–2011	England	55	(100)
2005	British & Irish Lions	1	(0)
- Correct as of 31 March 2012
National sevens team
Years	Team		Comps
2001	England Sevens		Hong Kong

Mark John Cueto MBE (born 26 December 1979 in Workington, Cumbria) is a former English international rugby union player. He played on the wing for Sale Sharks and England. He is currently the third leading try scorer in the Aviva Premiership.

On 28 January 2015, it was announced Cueto was to retire at the end of the 2014-15 season

== Biography ==
Mark Cueto was born to Frank and Anne Cueto. He has a sister called Rachel. He owes his surname to his Spanish great-grandfather, Antonio, who sailed from Santander in the 1900s and settled in Maryport, Cumbria, where he set up a fish-and-chip shop. His Cumbrian home town of Workington is in an area more associated with rugby league than union. Although he played his first rugby game as an eight-year-old in Workington, and played after he moved with his parents to Wolverhampton, he did not grow up playing the game. When he was 10 years old, his parents moved again to Crewe, where he took up football instead of rugby, becoming a keen Manchester United fan. He did not play rugby again until he was 17. His early clubs were Crewe & Nantwich RUFC, Sandbach RUFC and Altrincham Kersal, with the latter he won the Cheshire RFU Plate in 1998.

Then, when he was 17 and in his final A-level year at Alsager Comprehensive, there was the annual rugby match against Holmes Chapel. It was an occasion of no great importance. Holmes Chapel had a reasonable team, but rugby players were thin on the ground at Alsager and there was not much debate about the likely result. To make up a team, Alsager teacher Lindsay Purcell recruited a number of footballers. Cueto was one of those press-ganged into service, though when it came to sport he was easily persuaded. Football was number one but he had also done athletics, basketball, volleyball and cricket.

Cueto is married to Suzie (née Richards), originally from Corby in Northamptonshire, who works in the Manchester United FC hospitality department. She gave birth to a baby boy called Max, their first child, on 6 August 2010. The couple have two more sons called Louis (b. 2013) and Joshua (b. 2018). They live together in Altrincham. He is a graduate of Manchester Metropolitan University.

In 2009, Cueto was featured in a campaign of male underwear for Jockey International. He also appeared as a guest in two episodes of the quiz show A Question of Sport in 2005.

== Playing career ==
=== Sale Sharks ===
Cueto made his début for Sale Sharks against Bristol Shoguns in 2001 and made the England tour to Argentina in 2002, playing against Argentina A.

Cueto saw success at club level in his first five years at the club, winning the European Challenge Cup twice, first in 2002 when Sale beat Pontypridd 25–22 at the Kassam Stadium on 26 May 2002. He was also part of the Sale team that beat Pau, the champions in 2000, by 27 points to 3, also at the Kassam Stadium on 21 May 2005. Cueto scored a try in the victory. He had his best individual season in 2004–05, scoring 11 tries in just 18 games played. Cueto helped Sale Sharks to top the league in the 2005–06 season and carry that form through to win the season ending play-offs, scoring a try as they beat Leicester Tigers in the final, to become Premiership champions for the first time.

In May 2010, Cueto was voted into Sale Shark's Hall of Fame. He played his 150th match for Sale in their 54–21 defeat to Leicester in late December 2010. A few days later, Cueto was appointed club captain by the new coach Pete Anglesea; Anglesea replaced Mike Brewer as Sale had won just three out of nine matches in the 2010–11 season by mid-December. Cueto was Sale's sixth captain of the season. In April, Cueto was banned by the Rugby Football Union for nine weeks after pleading guilty to "making contact with the eye or eye area". The incident involved Christian Day and occurred in a match against Northampton on 2 April. At the start of the 2011–12 season, in August, Cueto was replaced as Sale captain, with Sam Tuitupou taking over role.

On 8 February 2013 Cueto broke the Premiership try scoring record of 75 by Steve Hanley, touching down for his 76th try in a 21-16 comeback win over Exeter. He eventually retired in 2015 after having scored a then record 90 tries. His record was broken on 10 February 2017 by Bristol's wing Tom Varndell.

Cueto was appointed Member of the Order of the British Empire (MBE) in the 2016 New Year Honours for services to rugby union.

=== International ===
Cueto represented England in the 2000–01 World Sevens Series. Cueto appears alongside All Blacks captain Richie McCaw on the cover of the United Kingdom version of the EA Sports game Rugby 08.

He was not selected for the full England squad during Clive Woodward's time as head coach, having to wait until November 2004 for his début against Canada at Twickenham, when he scored two tries. He would play for England up until 2011, scoring 20 tries, at the time the 7th most try scored for his Country.

In 2005, he was called up to the British & Irish Lions for their New Zealand tour after original selection Iain Balshaw was ruled out due to injury. He featured in the third Test at Eden Park, Auckland. The same year he was the top try scorer in the 2005 Six Nations with 4.

Cueto was a prominent member of England's 2007 Rugby World Cup in France. He started the first match of England's defence of the title at Full-back against the USA. He also played in England's embarrassing 36–0 defeat to South Africa. Having been dropped for the next match against Samoa, he was installed to the English defence for the encounter with Tonga, which ensured England's progression through to the quarter-final stage. He was left out of the surprise quarter-final victory against Australia and the even more surprising semi-final victory over France due to a niggling injury. During the semi-final, England wing Josh Lewsey suffered a pulled hamstring and was forced to miss the final.

Cueto was selected to take his place for the 2007 final against previous pool opponents, South Africa. His participation in the match became memorable when he was denied a try in the second half of the match by Australian television match official Stuart Dickinson. After a great deal of deliberation over real-time footage (and facing a language barrier with a French television producer who did not provide the stills he wanted) Dickinson disallowed the try on the basis of Cueto's left foot entering touch (touching the side-line) before the ball was grounded. This was not immediately obvious and Cueto's left leg was subsequently raised within the boundary of play, travelling over it after the ball was on the ground; this led many to believe the judgement had been wrongly made on the basis of the latter movement. A division of opinion still exists, although most experts including BBC Radio 5 Live presenter Ian Robertson subsequently backed Dickinson's decision.

He did not feature for England throughout 2008, but was recalled to the squad for the 2009 Six Nations, scoring a try in the opening game against Italy and in England's 34–10 victory over France.

Cueto was a regular for England throughout 2010 and 2011, and contributed to England's successful 2011 Six Nations campaign. Cueto won his 50th cap for England in the final match of the Six Nations against Ireland. Cueto missed the first 2 games of the 2011 Rugby World cup in New Zealand due to a back injury, but completed a hat-trick of tries when returning to the starting line up against Romania.

=== International tries ===
Try	Opposing team	Location	Venue	Competition	Date	Result	Score
1	Canada	London, England	Twickenham Stadium	2004 end-of-year rugby union internationals	13 November 2004	Win	70 – 0
2	Canada	London, England	Twickenham Stadium	2004 end-of-year rugby union internationals	13 November 2004	Win	70 – 0
3	South Africa	London, England	Twickenham Stadium	2004 end-of-year rugby union internationals	20 November 2004	Win	32 – 16
4	Australia	London, England	Twickenham Stadium	2004 end-of-year rugby union internationals	27 November 2004	Loss	19 – 21
5	Italy	London, England	Twickenham Stadium	2005 Six Nations Championship	12 March 2005	Win	39 – 7
6	Italy	London, England	Twickenham Stadium	2005 Six Nations Championship	12 March 2005	Win	39 – 7
7	Italy	London, England	Twickenham Stadium	2005 Six Nations Championship	12 March 2005	Win	39 – 7
8	Scotland	London, England	Twickenham Stadium	2005 Six Nations Championship	19 March 2005	Win	43 – 22
9	Australia	London, England	Twickenham Stadium	2005 end-of-year rugby union internationals	12 November 2005	Win	26 – 16
10	Wales	London, England	Twickenham Stadium	2006 Six Nations Championship	4 February 2006	Win	47 – 13
11	Italy	Rome, Italy	Stadio Flaminio	2006 Six Nations Championship	11 February 2006	Win	16 – 31
12	South Africa	London, England	Twickenham Stadium	2006 South Africa rugby union tour of Ireland and England	18 November 2006	Win	23 – 21
13	South Africa	London, England	Twickenham Stadium	2006 South Africa rugby union tour of Ireland and England	25 November 2006	Loss	14 – 25
14	Italy	London, England	Twickenham Stadium	2009 Six Nations Championship	7 February 2009	Win	36 – 11
15	France	London, England	Twickenham Stadium	2009 Six Nations Championship	15 March 2009	Win	34 – 10
16	Italy	London, England	Twickenham Stadium	2011 Six Nations Championship	12 February 2011	Win	59 – 13
17	Romania	Dunedin, New Zealand	Otago Stadium	2011 Rugby World Cup	24 September 2011	Win	67 – 3
18	Romania	Dunedin, New Zealand	Otago Stadium	2011 Rugby World Cup	24 September 2011	Win	67 – 3
19	Romania	Dunedin, New Zealand	Otago Stadium	2011 Rugby World Cup	24 September 2011	Win	67 – 3
20	France	Auckland, New Zealand	Eden Park	2011 Rugby World Cup	8 October 2011	Loss	12 – 19

== Coaching career ==
After being out of the game for 10 years, in February 2025 it was announced that Cueto would take on the role of assistant coach for Sale Sharks Women.

== Honours ==
=== Sale Sharks ===
- English Premiership
  - Champions (1): 2005–06
- European Challenge Cup
  - Champions (2): 2001–02, 2004–05
- Anglo-Welsh Cup
  - Runners-up (2): 2003–04, 2012–13

=== England ===
- Six Nations Championship
  - Champions (1): 2011
- Rugby World Cup
  - Runners-up (1): 2007
