= Jason Hobson =

England international rugby union player

- Born: Jason Hobson; 10 February 1983 (age 43) Swansea, Wales
- Height: 5 ft 11 in (1.80 m)
- Weight: 108 kg (17 st 0 lb)
- School: Bodmin College

Rugby union career
- Position: Prop
Youth career
- Wadebridge Camels
Senior career
Years	Team	Apps	(Points)
1999–2003	Exeter Chiefs	33	(25)
2003–2009	Bristol Rugby	62	(30)
2009–2011	London Wasps		
2011–2014	Bristol Rugby		
- Correct as of 27 December 2008
International career
Years	Team	Apps	(Points)
2008	England Saxons	1	(0)
2008	England	1	(0)
- Correct as of 21 June 2008

Jason Hobson (born 10 February 1983 in Swansea, Wales) is a former rugby union player who played at prop

== Club career ==
Hobson started his professional career at the Exeter Chiefs. He moved to Bristol Rugby in the summer of 2003.

On 9 June 2009, it was announced that he would be joining London Wasps on a 2-year deal ahead of the 2009–10 Guinness Premiership following Bristol's relegation from the Premiership. Hobson ruptured his Achilles and did not feature for Wasps during the 2009–10 campaign.

In February 2011, after Hobson's contract with Wasps was terminated, he signed for his old club Bristol for the remainder of the 2010-11 RFU Championship.

On 29 August 2014, Hobson announced his retirement from professional rugby with immediate effect.

== International career ==
Hobson represented England at U21 level. He made his debut for the England Saxons side that defeated the Ireland Wolfhounds on 1 February 2008.

On 13 May, Hobson was called up to the Senior England Squad for the 2008 Summer tour of New Zealand. He made his international debut against New Zealand in Christchurch on 21 June 2008 where he came on for Matt Stevens.
