= Nick Walshe =

England international rugby union player

- Born: Nicholas Patrick James Walshe; 1 November 1974 (age 52) Chiswick, London, England
- Height: 5 ft 10 in (1.78 m)
- Weight: 13 st 5 lb (85 kg)
- School: Worth School
- University: Kingston University

Rugby union career
- Position: Scrum-half
- Current team: Coventry Rugby
Amateur team(s)
Years	Team	Apps	(Points)
- Rosslyn Park
Senior career
Years	Team	Apps	(Points)
1993–1995	Rosslyn Park	25	
1995–1999	NEC Harlequins		
1999–2002	Saracens		
2002–2004	Sale Sharks		
2004–2008	Bath	96	(44)
2008–2011	Bedford Blues		
International career
Years	Team	Apps	(Points)
2006	England	2	(0)

Nicholas Patrick James Walshe (born 1 November 1974), is a rugby union coach and former player. He was capped twice for England, and was Head Coach of the England Under 20 taking them to successive victories in the 2013 and 2014 IRB Junior World Championship.

== Education ==
Walshe was educated at Worth, an independent school in West Sussex.

== Playing career ==
Walshe played at scrum-half.

He moved from Saracens to Sale Sharks in 2002. He moved again in 2004 to Bath.

Walshe was first called up to the senior England squad by Clive Woodward for the 2000 England rugby union tour of South Africa. He appeared several times over the years for the England A Team before winning his two full caps as a replacement on the 2006 tour to Australia.

== Coaching career ==
In 2007 Walshe began coaching part-time at a local Bath club, Old Sulians, laying the foundations for their promotion to the Somerset Premier. Walshe moved on again at the beginning of 2008 to a player/backs coach role at Bedford Blues.

=== England U-20s ===
In 2011 Walshe moved to work at the RFU Elite Rugby Department as Assistant Coach to Rob Hunter for the England Under 20's Squad.

In 2013 he moved to Head Coach and became leader of the team that for the first time ever secured England as the IRB Junior World Champions for 2013. In that particular tournament in France, England set another record achievement of defeating the four times IRB Junior World Champions, The New Zealand All Blacks in the semi-finals.

In 2014 Walshe and his team successfully defended their championship title, in Auckland, New Zealand.

=== Gloucester ===
From June 2014 to May 2016 he held the position of backs and attack coach at Gloucester Rugby.

=== Coventry ===
In September of the 2016–2017 season he joined Coventry Rugby Club as attack coach, and guided the team to a 4th-place finish in RFU National One. In June 2017 it was announced that Walshe signed a new contract to become Head Coach at Coventry, ahead of the 2017/18 season.
