= Chiliboy Ralepelle =

South African rugby union player (born 1986)

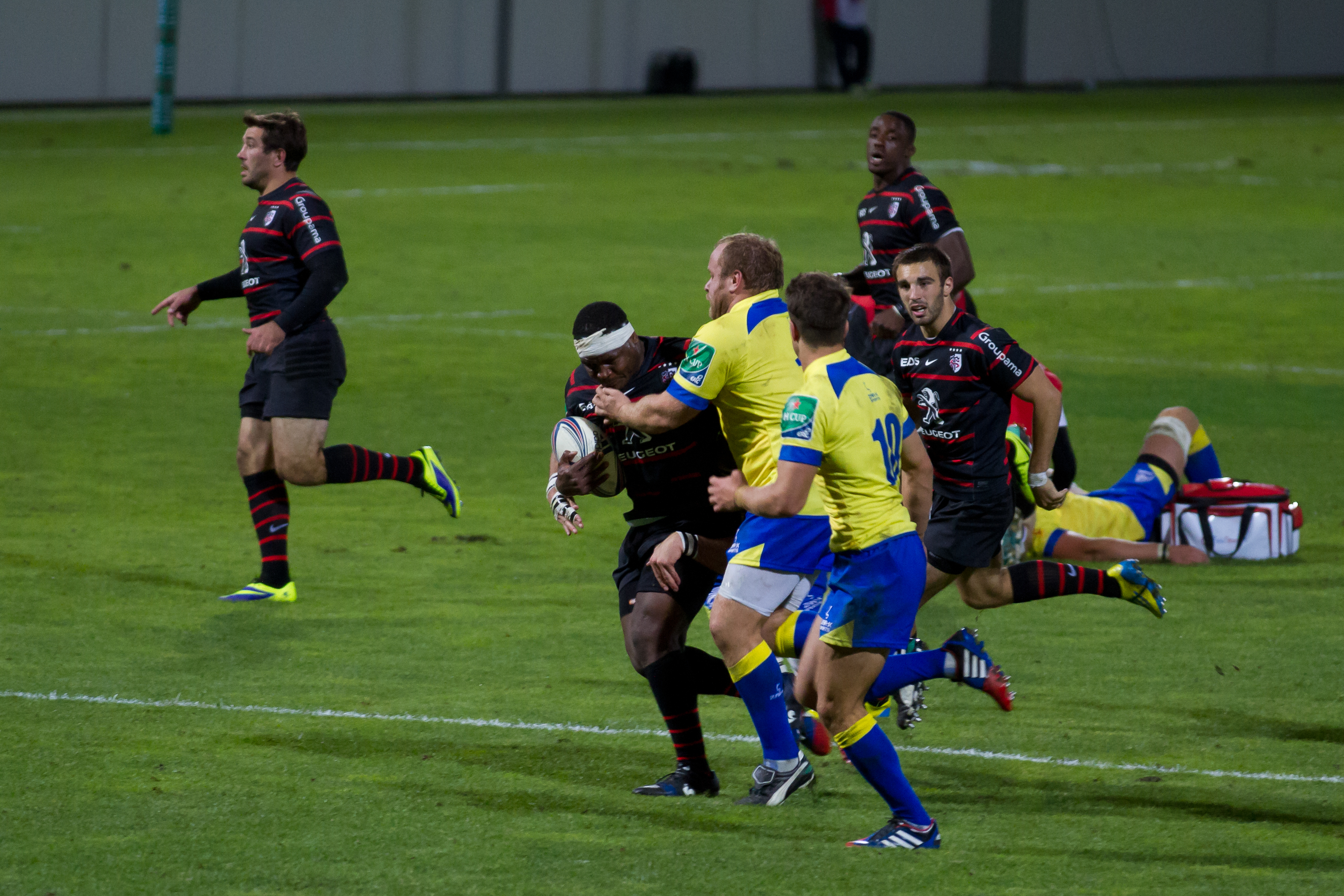
- Chiliboy Ralepelle with the ball
- Full name: Mahlatse Chiliboy Ralepelle
- Born: 11 September 1986 (age 40) Tzaneen, South Africa
- Height: 1.80 m (5 ft 11 in)
- Weight: 104 kg (229 lb; 16 st 5 lb)
- School: Pretoria Boys High School

Rugby union career
- Position: Hooker
Youth career
- 2005: Blue Bulls
Senior career
Years	Team	Apps	(Points)
2006–2012	Blue Bulls	35	(15)
2006–2013	Bulls	69	(20)
2013–2015	Toulouse	16	(0)
2016	Sharks XV	2	(0)
2016–2018	Sharks	35	(10)
2016–2018	Sharks (Currie Cup)	20	(20)
- Correct as of 3 November 2018
International career
Years	Team	Apps	(Points)
2002–2003	South Africa Schools		
2004–2005	South Africa Under-19		
2005–2006	South Africa Under-21	9	(0)
2006–2018	South Africa (tests)	25	(5)
2006 & 2009	South Africa (tour)	2	(0)
- Correct as of 23 June 2018

Mahlatse Chiliboy Ralepelle (born 11 September 1986 in Tzaneen, South Africa) is a former rugby union player for the Sharks in Super Rugby and in the Currie Cup. His usual position is at hooker.

== Career ==
=== Youth rugby ===
As a pupil at Pretoria Boys High School, Ralepelle played for the South African Schools team in 2002 and 2003 and went on to play for the South African Under-19 side in 2004. He once again played for the Under-19s in 2005 and also made the step up to the national Under-21 team in the same year. Ralepelle captained the Under-21s at the 2006 Under 21 Rugby World Championship in France. South Africa made it to the final of the tournament, but were defeated by 13–24 the hosts.

=== 2005–06 ===
While still eligible to play Under-19 rugby in 2005, Ralepelle was included in the Blue Bulls squad for the 2005 Vodacom Cup. He didn't make any appearances in the competition, but did captain the Blue Bulls U21 side in the Under-19 Provincial Championship.

He made his first class debut for the Bulls in their opening match of the 2006 Super 14 season, coming on as a last-minute replacement in their 30–18 victory against the Cheetahs in Bloemfontein. One more appearance from the bench followed in their home match against the Waratahs, before Ralepelle moved to the Vodacom Cup squad. He made five appearances for the Blue Bulls in the 2006 Vodacom Cup and scored his first senior try in their match against the Griffons in a 30–6 victory.

Despite having less than ten minutes of Super Rugby experience and five Vodacom Cup matches to his name, Ralepelle was included in the Springboks squad for the 2006 Tri Nations Series. Head coach Jake White named Ralepelle on the bench for the second test against Australia in Sydney, but he failed to make an appearance. In their next match against New Zealand in Pretoria on 26 August 2006, he came on as a late substitute to make his Springbok debut, aged just 19. He also was an unused replacement in the final two Tri Nations games.

Ralepelle was then included in the South African squad for the 2006 tour to the Northern Hemisphere. He was an unused bench replacement in the match against Ireland and for the first Test against England. Ralepelle appeared as a substitute in the second Test at Twickenham. For the last match of the tour, Ralepelle was named as captain for the match against the World XV at Walkers Stadium in Leicester, becoming the first black player - and the youngest - to captain the national team.

=== 2007–08 ===
He made a single appearance in 2007, in a Super 14 match against the Cheetahs. He then picked up a serious knee injury that ruled him out of rugby for the remainder of the year. He made his return in pre-season matches prior to the 2008, but once again injured his knee during the captain's run prior to a warm-up match against the SWD Eagles in George.

After 18 months out of action with knee injuries, he returned to the field in August 2008 in the 2008 Currie Cup Premier Division, making his Currie Cup debut two-and-a-half years after he made his Super Rugby debut. He came on as a second-half replacement for Bandise Maku in their match against the Falcons in Brakpan, helping them to a 50–7 win. With his injury problems now behind him, he made eight appearances in the Currie Cup as he helped the Blue Bulls reach the final of the competition. He played off the bench in the final, but could not prevent Durban-based side the Sharks running out 14–9 winners.

He won back his place in the South Africa squad, being included in their tour of Great Britain in November 2008, making one appearance in their 42–6 victory against England.

=== 2009–10 ===
He made fifteen appearances for the Bulls in the 2009 Super 14 season, also scoring his first try in this competition in their match against the Cheetahs. He helped the Bulls reach the final of the competition, a match in which Ralepelle featured as a second-half replacement to help the Bulls to a 61–17 victory against the Chiefs.

He was included in the South Africa squad for the 2009 British & Irish Lions tour to South Africa, making one appearance, by starting the Third Test match against the Lions. He also made four appearances for the national side during the 2009 Tri Nations Series, helping South Africa win the competition for the third time.

He captained a South Africa XV in their match against Leicester Tigers during the 2009 end-of-year rugby union internationals, with the Premiership side running out 22–17 winners, but sustained a foot injury which required a foot operation and kept him out of action for three months.

He made five appearances for the Blue Bulls during the 2010 Vodacom Cup, but made just one appearance against the Stormers in Cape Town during the 2010 Super 14 season. This didn't affect his national team prospects, however, as he featured in the 2010 mid-year rugby union internationals, playing in matches against Wales, France and Italy. He also made five appearances during the 2010 Tri Nations Series and a further eight appearances in domestic action for the Blue Bulls during the 2010 Currie Cup Premier Division.

He was once again selected in the South Africa squad that toured Great Britain and Ireland during the 2010 end-of-year rugby union internationals. However, on 15 November 2010, Ralepelle (along with winger Bjorn Basson) was suspended and sent back to South Africa following a positive drugs test after their match against Ireland, with traces of banned substance methylhexanamine found in his system. After an investigation, the South African Rugby Union found both players innocent of all charges and issued a public apology to them. Both players were given diet supplement Anabolic Nitro Nitric Oxide Extreme Energy Surge by team officials. While previous tests of this product in South Africa yielded negative results, the British version of the product did contain methylhexanamine, resulting in the positive test results.

=== 2011–13 ===
Ralepelle played in sixteen Super Rugby matches for the Bulls in 2011, getting one try in their match against the Force, but the Bulls finished in seventh place on the log to miss out on a play-off spot. He made two appearances for South Africa during the 2011 Tri Nations Series and scored his first international try in their match against Australia in Sydney. He made three appearances for the Blue Bulls during the 2011 Currie Cup Premier Division before being named in the Springbok squad that played at the 2011 Rugby World Cup. He made just one appearance in the competition though, coming on as a substitute in their 87–0 victory over Namibia.

He started in seventeen matches for the Bulls during the 2012 Super Rugby season, helping them reach the play-offs, where they were eliminated by the Crusaders. However, despite being named in South Africa's squad, he missed out on the 2012 Rugby Championship, once again suffering a knee injury. He did return to action at the end of the year, making three appearances for the Blue Bulls in the 2012 Currie Cup Premier Division before being an unused player for South Africa's end-of-year tour.

He once again played in seventeen matches for the Bulls during the 2013 Super Rugby season, his most prolific season ever, scoring two tries – one in their match against the Stormers and one against the Southern Kings.

He made one more appearance for the Springboks, coming on as a late substitute in their match against Italy during the 2013 mid-year rugby union tests. In June 2013, the Bulls announced that Ralepelle would join French Top 14 side Toulouse after the 2013 Currie Cup Premier Division season, but he failed to feature in the competition.

=== Toulouse and drugs ban ===
He made his debut for Toulouse in their 38–5 victory over Italian side Zebre in the 2013–14 Heineken Cup. Two weeks later, he made his domestic debut, helping Toulouse to a 13–12 victory over Toulon in their 2013–14 Top 14 match. He made a total of ten appearances in the Top 14 and a further six in the Heineken Cup for Toulouse. His final match for them came in February 2014, when he started in their 16–6 win against Biarritz, but tore his knee ligaments during the match, which ruled him out during the remainder of the season.

On 19 March 2014, Ralepelle faced an out-of-competition drugs test, where he tested positive for anabolic steroid drostanolone. The hearing into this positive drugs test was set for mid-March 2015, but Ralepelle had his contract with Toulouse cancelled and returned to South Africa. He was eventually banned for two years, for a period 10 April 2014 to 10 April 2016, effective from the date that the player's initial provisional suspension came into effect.

=== Return to rugby : Sharks ===
Durban-based Super Rugby outfit the Sharks announced that Ralepelle would join them prior to the 2016 Super Rugby season.

=== 8 Year Ban ===
During an out-of-competition test on 17 January 2019 he tested positive for Zeranol and was banned for eight years.
