= Keith Robinson (rugby union) =

NZ international rugby union player

Rugby union career
- Position: Lock
Senior career
Years	Team	Apps	(Points)
1998–1999	Thames Valley	22	(0)
2000–2001	Taranaki	20	(0)
2001–2007	Chiefs	42	(0)
2002–2006	Waikato	29	(5)
- Correct as of 23 November 2019
International career
Years	Team	Apps	(Points)
2002–2007	New Zealand	12	(0)
- Correct as of 23 November 2019

Keith Robinson is a former New Zealand rugby union footballer. His usual position is at lock. He was first selected for New Zealand's national team, the All Blacks in 2002. His career was plagued by injury, and he was selected into the 2006 All Blacks after making a remarkable comeback from a serious back injury. He last played against the Pacific Islanders in 2004 before making a comeback in the 2006 Autumn internationals. He made his Test debut on the All Blacks end-of-year tour in 2002 but, after three Tests, had to wait another 18 months to be recalled by Graham Henry for the Tri-Nations Tests in 2004. Robinson made a surprise return to Waikato's Air New Zealand Cup side in September 2006. In October 2007 he announced he was retiring from all rugby at the age of only 30. He cited his recurring left knee injury as the reason for his retirement.

== Conviction ==
Robinson pleaded guilty to a charge of injuring with intent to injure after punching a man while on a pub crawl in 2012. He was sentenced to 300 hours of community service and ordered to pay $1,000 to his victim.
