= George Chuter =

England international rugby union player

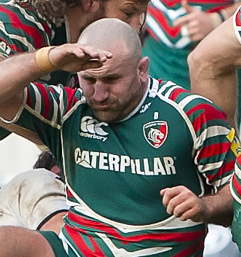
- Chuter in 2012
- Born: George Scala Chuter; 9 July 1976 (age 50) Greenwich, London, England
- Height: 1.80 m (5 ft 11 in)
- Weight: 98 kg (15 st 6 lb)
- School: Trinity School of John Whitgift
- University: West London Institute
- Notable relative: Colette Struthers

Rugby union career
- Position: Hooker
- Current team: Leicester Tigers
Youth career
- Old Mid-Whitgiftians
Senior career
Years	Team	Apps	(Points)
1996–2000	Saracens	92	(45)
2000–2014	Leicester Tigers	292	(70)
International career
Years	Team	Apps	(Points)
2006–2010	England	24	(5)
- Correct as of 10 July 2014

George Scala Chuter (born 9 July 1976) is an English rugby union ex player who played at Hooker for Leicester Tigers.

== Biography ==
Chuter was born in Greenwich. He first started playing as a 12-year-old, when he went to Trinity School of John Whitgift in the London Borough of Croydon. He quickly established himself at hooker. He went on to play his club rugby for Old Mid-Whitgiftians and gained representative honours for the London Division U18 side.

== Club career ==
Chuter was invited to trial for Saracens F.C. at the age of 19, where he played for five years.

Chuter took a year off and decided to travel in the U.S. and Australia; he was in Sydney for the 2000 Olympic Games. On returning he signed for Leicester Tigers in December 2000. After the departure of Richard Cockerill in the summer of 2002, he competed with Dorian West as first choice hooker.

In the 2006–07 season, Chuter played as Leicester won the final of the Guinness Premiership and Heineken Cup.

Chuter started in the final of the 2008–09 Guinness Premiership, which Leicester won, and 2008–09 Heineken Cup. Chuter started in the final of the 2009–10 Guinness Premiership, winning his third Premiership medal.

Chuter retired in 2014.

Chuter is currently Director of Rugby at Hinckley Rugby Club.

== International career ==
In 1994–95 Chuter won his first cap for England Colts against Scotland and also went on that year's summer tour to Canada. In 1998 he made a try-scoring debut for England A against France A at Tours, and in the same year went on the senior England 'tour to hell' against Australia, New Zealand and South Africa, featuring in the uncapped match at Invercargill against New Zealand Academy.

In 2003 Chuter was back in the England reckoning, and in 2004 was a member of the England A squad at the 2004 Churchill Cup in Canada. He was then selected for the Elite Player Squad but a second citing in October resulted in his missing the opportunity to take part in the November Tests. Chuter made his debut against Australia during England's 2006 Tour of Australia. In the second test of the series and his second England appearance Chuter scored a try in a 43–18 defeat.

Sporting a full beard, he featured in the 2007 World Cup squad, battling with Mark Regan for the role of first-choice hooker. Chuter was a used replacement in the 2007 Rugby World Cup Final.
