= Chris Jones (rugby union) =

England international rugby union footballer

- Born: Christopher Michael Jones; 24 June 1980 (age 46) Manchester, England
- Height: 1.98 m (6 ft 6 in)
- Weight: 111 kg (17 st 7 lb)
- School: Stockport Grammar School
- University: Sheffield Hallam University

Rugby union career
- Position: Lock / Flanker
Youth career
- -: Altrincham Kersal
- –: Fylde
Senior career
Years	Team	Apps	(Points)
2001–2011	Sale Sharks	138	(90)
2011–2014	Worcester Warriors		
2014–2016	Yorkshire Carnegie		
International career
Years	Team	Apps	(Points)
2003–2007	England Saxons		
2004–2007	England	12	(5)

Christopher Michael Jones (born 24 June 1980) is a retired English rugby union rugby player. He played as a lock or flanker, featuring for Sale Sharks and Worcester Warriors in the English Premiership and Yorkshire Carnegie in the RFU Championship.

His rugby union career blossomed at Stockport Grammar School. He went on to take a Business Studies course at Sheffield Hallam University and was two years into it when the Sale Sharks invited him to join them. He played for Cheshire at U18 and U20 level, then briefly with Fylde before joining Sale Sharks.

He made a startling rise to the England Sevens squad, and was nominated for the 2003 PRA Young Player of the Year Award. He was part of the England A team that beat France A, Scotland A and Italy A in their 2003 Six Nations and also went on the unbeaten England tour to North America and Japan that year.

He played for England in the uncapped match against the Barbarians at Twickenham in May 2003.

The year 2004 marked another leap forward. He was called up to the senior team by then head coach Clive Woodward from the start of the Six Nations. He came off the bench against Italy for his debut cap and scored a try. This earned him a starting position against Scotland as a flanker and again against Wales from where he continued to impress. He was selected for the 2004 Summer tour, starting against the All Blacks in Dunedin in the first Test.

Sale Sharks director of rugby Kingsley Jones referred to him as 'the most hard done-by player in England' after he was hardly used during the 2005 Autumn test series.

Jones went on to collect more caps on the 2006 Summer tour of Australia and 2007 Summer tour of South Africa.

In the 2005–2006 season, Jones started the final as Sale Sharks won their first ever Premiership title. He was also voted Sale's player of the year in 2006 and again in 2008.

On 22 May 2014, Jones officially joined Yorkshire Carnegie in the RFU Championship on a two-year contract from the 2014–15 season.

On 19 May 2016 Jones announced his retirement from rugby after suffering a concussion against Nottingham in April of that year.

== Personal life ==
Jones married Donna in 2008 at Dromoland Castle, County Clare, Ireland. They live in Cheshire and have four children - Daniel, Alánnah, Harrison and William.
