= Tim Payne (rugby union) =

England international rugby union player

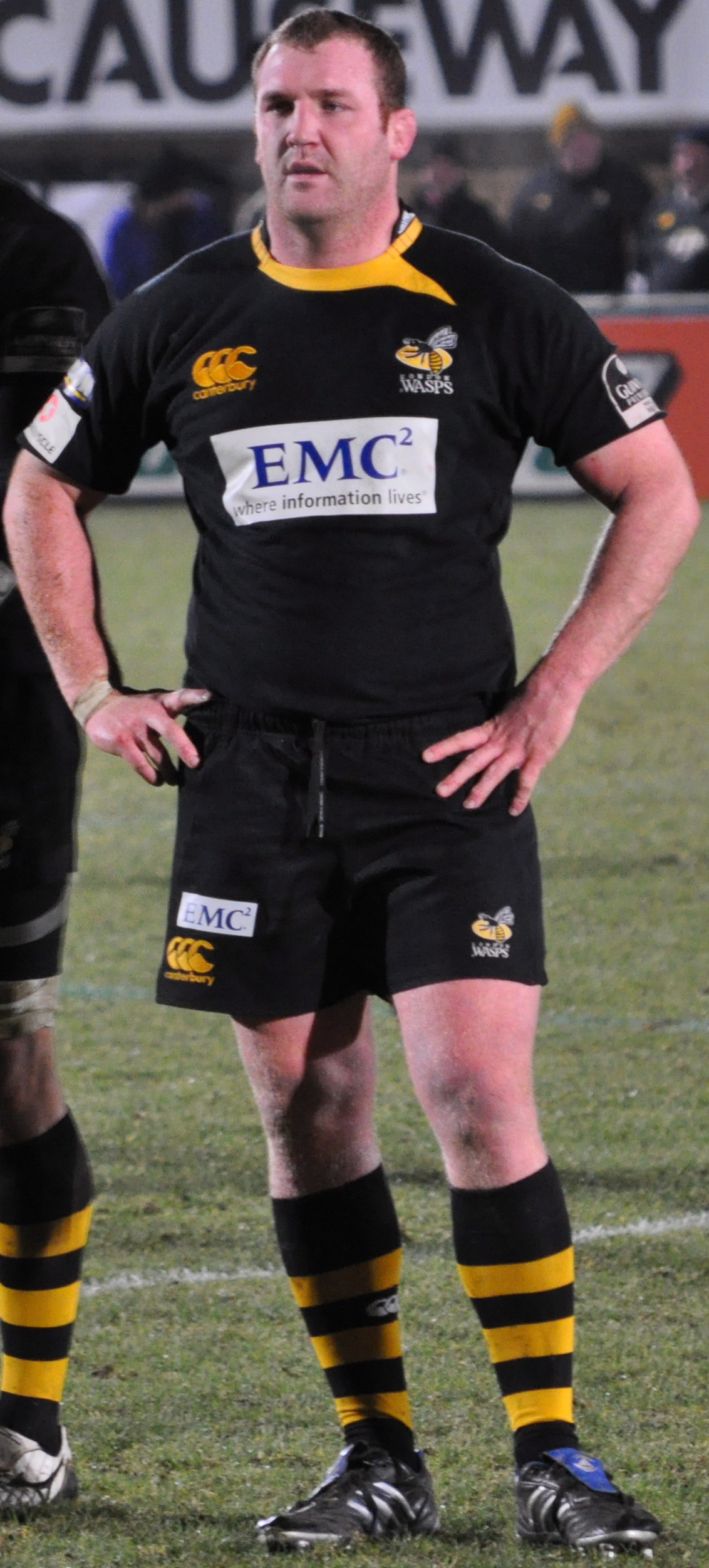
- Born: Timothy Adam North Payne; 29 April 1979 (age 47) Swindon, England
- Height: 1.85 m (6 ft 1 in)
- Weight: 117 kg (18 st 6 lb)
- School: Royal Agricultural University; Wycliffe College
- University: University of Bristol

Rugby union career
- Position: Prop
Youth career
- Painswick RFC
Senior career
Years	Team	Apps	(Points)
1998–2001	Coventry	25	(5)
2001–2002	Bristol Shoguns	6	(0)
2002–2003	Cardiff	27	(0)
2003–2013	Wasps	266	(50)
International career
Years	Team	Apps	(Points)
2004–2010	England	22	(0)
- Correct as of 13 November 2011

Timothy Adam North Payne (born 29 April 1979) is an English former rugby union footballer. A prop, he spent the majority of his career with London Wasps and made 22 appearances for England.

== Club career ==
Payne started his playing career as a child at Painswick RFC- the oldest village rugby club in England. He then moved to senior rugby at Stroud RFC. Payne has previously played for Coventry R.F.C., Bristol Shoguns and Cardiff RFC.

In 2003 Payne joined London Wasps. In his first season with his new club he scored a try in the Premiership semi-final win over Northampton Saints and started in the final as Wasps beat Bath to retain their league title. That season he also started in the 2004 Heineken Cup final which saw Wasps defeat Toulouse to achieve a league and European double.

In his second season with Wasps, Payne started in the 2005 Premiership final against Leicester Tigers as they retained their league title. The following campaign he was part of the side that beat Scarlets in the 2006 Anglo-Welsh Cup final.

Payne played in their 2007 European quarter-final victory over Leinster. He missed the semi-final and 2007 Heineken Cup final due to injury. The following season he started in the 2008 Premiership final as Wasps overcame Leicester to become League champions again.

In July 2013, having made 266 appearances for Wasps over a decade, Payne announced his retirement after a neck injury.

== International career ==
Payne was selected for the senior England squad on their 2004 Summer tour. On 26 June 2004, Payne made his Test debut starting in a defeat against Australia at Lang Park. After making his debut the next two caps again came in defeats against the Wallabies on their 2006 tour.

Payne made his first Six Nations appearance during the 2007 Six Nations Championship against France and also played in their last round defeat to Wales. He also featured in the 2008 Six Nations. Later that year Payne was part of their 2008 tour of New Zealand and played in both test defeats as the All Blacks won the series.

In June 2009, Payne started in a victory over Argentina at Old Trafford. He also played in the next test which Los Pumas won to draw the series. A week later Payne was called-up to the 2009 British & Irish lions tour of South Africa. He did not feature in a Test match but did start in a tour game against Emerging Springboks.

Payne started all five games during the 2010 Six Nations. Later that year he was included in the England squad for their 2010 tour of Australia and started in the opening test defeat against the Wallabies. Payne also played in the next test which England won to draw the series. Ultimately this proved to be his last appearance for England.

== Honours ==
Wasps

- European Rugby Champions Cup: 2003–04, 2006–07
- Premiership Rugby: 2003–04, 2004–05, 2007–08
- Anglo-Welsh Cup: 2005–06
