= Charlie Hodgson =

English rugby union player

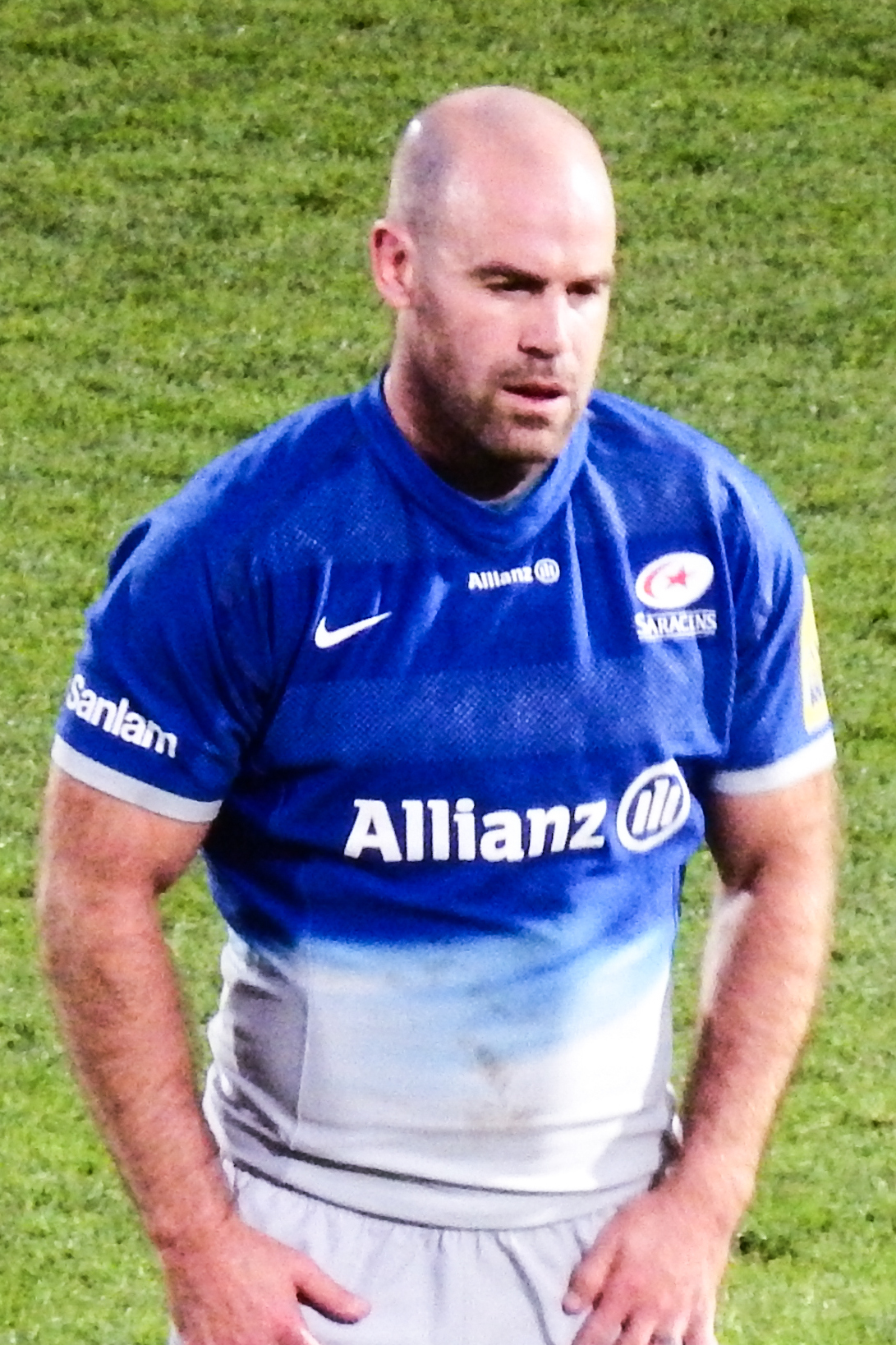
- Hodgson in 2015
- Born: Charles Christopher Hodgson; 12 November 1980 (age 46) Halifax, England
- Height: 1.83 m (6 ft 0 in)
- Weight: 86 kg (13 st 8 lb)
- School: Bradford Grammar School
- University: University of Durham

Rugby union career
- Position: Fly-half
- Current team: Harpenden rugby club
Senior career
Years	Team	Apps	(Points)
2000–11	Sale Sharks	228	(2558)
2011–16	Saracens	132	(870)
- Correct as of 21 May 2016
International career
Years	Team	Apps	(Points)
2001–12	England	38	(269)
2005	British & Irish Lions		
- Correct as of 25 October 2011
Coaching career
- Years: Team
- 2017- 2018: London Irish

Charles Christopher Hodgson (born 12 November 1980) is a retired English rugby union player, having previously been a player for Sale Sharks and Saracens. His position was fly-half and he is the leading Premiership points scorer of all time. Hodgson also played for England, until announcing his international retirement in 2012. Hodgson made 18 consecutive starts at fly half for England between 2004 and 2006.

== Early life ==
Born on 12 November 1980 in Halifax, West Yorkshire, Hodgson was educated at Bradford Grammar School; the school hosts a rugby tournament for under-12s called the Charlie Hodgson Cup. He was a huge Halifax rugby league fan long before he ever played rugby union. A family friend invited him to Old Brodleians rugby club and his first game was for the opposition, as they were short. He has also played for Old Brodleians, Durham University and Yorkshire. He was first picked for Yorkshire by Keith Dyas.

== International ==
He marked his England début with a record-breaking 44-point haul against Romania in November 2001, the most by any England player in a test match, when England won 134–0.

He was selected at centre in the 2003 Six Nations. He played 2 games at centre, only to be demoted to the subs bench for the third match against Italy. It was in this game he picked up a serious injury. He made a return to action during the 2003/04 season, after having been sidelined for eight months with a ruptured cruciate ligament in his left knee. The injury had denied him selection for the 2003 World Cup and another injury kept him out of the 2004 Six Nations. He played at fly-half during the 2004 summer tour to the Southern Hemisphere, for all three internationals against New Zealand and Australia. He was named Man of the Match against Canada in the Autumn of that year.

Hodgson has received criticism for not being Jonny Wilkinson and his inconsistent goal kicking, which was partly responsible for England's disappointing performance in the 2005 Six Nations championship.

Hodgson was selected for the 2005 British & Irish Lions tour of New Zealand.

Whilst playing for England against South Africa on 18 November 2006, Hodgson ruptured the cruciate ligament in his right knee that ensured he would miss the rest of the 2006/07 season. Subsequently, he did not appear for England throughout the whole of 2007, missing the 2007 Rugby World Cup through injury, just as he had in 2003. Hodgson made his return to the England squad for the 2008 Six Nations Championship. Hodgson was dropped during England's tour of New Zealand in 2008 as he was perceived to have a weak defence.

After two years away from the international side, Hodgson was selected to play for England in May 2010. During his time away from the England set-up, Hodgson had improved his defence enough to impress the new coach, Martin Johnson.

Hodgson was selected for England's June tour of New Zealand. He was selected at fly-half for the first test but was subbed early in the second half because of some defensive errors most notably the missed tackle on centre Ma'a Nonu which led to a try. He took no further part in the tour. Hodgson's next game for England was against the Barbarians on 29 May 2010 however he was substituted in the first half due to a facial injury. Hodgson was included in Johnson's squad to tour Australia in June 2010, although he did not play in the Tests.

Although not originally in England's squad for the 2010 autumn internationals, Hodgson was called up as cover after Wilkinson suffered a shoulder injury. In England's 21–11 defeat to South Africa Hodgson sustained what was thought to be a bruised foot; however, it was later discovered that the suspected bruise was a broken foot. In June 2012, Hodgson announced his retirement from international Rugby.

=== International tries ===
Try	Opposing team	Location	Venue	Competition	Date	Result	Score
1	Romania	London, England	Twickenham Stadium	2001 end-of-year rugby union internationals	17 November 2001	Win	134 – 0
2	Romania	London, England	Twickenham Stadium	2001 end-of-year rugby union internationals	17 November 2001	Win	134 – 0
3	Canada	London, England	Twickenham Stadium	2004 end-of-year rugby union internationals	13 November 2004	Win	70 – 0
4	South Africa	London, England	Twickenham Stadium	2004 end-of-year rugby union internationals	20 November 2004	Win	32 – 16
5	Samoa	London, England	Twickenham Stadium	2005 end-of-year rugby union internationals	26 November 2005	Win	40 – 3
6	Italy	Rome, Italy	Stadio Flaminio	2006 Six Nations Championship	11 February 2006	Win	16 – 31
7	Scotland	Edinburgh, Scotland	Murrayfield Stadium	2012 Six Nations Championship	4 February 2012	Win	6 – 13
8	Italy	Rome, Italy	Stadio Olimpico	2012 Six Nations Championship	11 February 2012	Win	15 – 19

== Club career ==
Hodgson first played for Sale Sharks against French club Auch in 2000. Sale Sharks is where Hodgson has seen his greatest success in winning the 2005/06 Guinness Premiership in a dominant victory over Leicester Tigers at Twickenham. In the final he contributed 6 penalties, a conversion and a drop goal. Hodgson has been voted Sale Sharks player of the season three times: 2008, 2009, and 2010.

In an attempt to correct a long-standing shoulder problem, Hodgson underwent surgery in August 2010. Although he missed the start of the 2010/11 season, he recovered to take his place in Sale's team in September. He returned from injury on 2 January 2011, taking part in Sale's 28–22 win against Saracens.

Just over a week later, Hodgson signed a three-year contract with Saracens, stating that he wanted a "new challenge". Sale's chief executive, Mick Hogan, paid tribute to Hodgson, saying that "Without doubt, he will be considered among the greatest players to ever play for Sale Sharks". Towards the end of the seasons, in April, Hodgson scored his 1,000th point at Edgeley Park. He passed the landmark in a match against Gloucester; Hodgson assumed the role of captain for the game and victory helped Sale avoid relegation. During his time at Saracens he won two Premiership titles in 2015 and 2016, as a replacement in both finals. He also helped Saracens win the European Champions Cup in 2016, again as a replacement in the final. In 2016, Hodgson Announced his retirement from rugby union.

== Personal life ==
On 23 June 2007, Hodgson married Daisy Hartley at Bolton Abbey in Yorkshire. The couple have five children (Henry, Anastasia, Jack, Freddie, Sam).

== See also ==
- List of top English points scorers and try scorers
