= JP Pietersen =

South African rugby union player

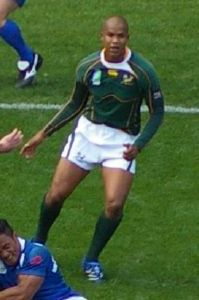
- Full name: Jon-Paul Roger Pietersen
- Born: 12 July 1986 (age 40) Stellenbosch, South Africa
- Height: 1.90 m (6 ft 3 in)
- Weight: 106 kg (234 lb; 16 st 10 lb)
- School: Hoërskool Generaal Hertzog
- Notable relative(s): Dusty Noble, Howard Noble (cousins)

Rugby union career
- Position: Wing / Centre / Fullback
Senior career
Years	Team	Apps	(Points)
2005–2012	Sharks (Currie Cup)	42	(85)
2006–2016	Sharks	137	(198)
2013–2016	Panasonic Wild Knights	25	(70)
2016–2017	Leicester Tigers	15	(15)
2017–2019	Toulon	38	(45)
2019–2021	Sharks (Currie Cup)	7	(5)
2020	Sharks	1	(0)
- Correct as of 28 April 2021
International career
Years	Team	Apps	(Points)
2006–2016	South Africa (tests)	70	(120)
2006–2016	South Africa (tour) (Note: In addition to playing in test matches, Pietersen featured in four non-test matches for South Africa. Two of these were international tour matches, and in 2014 and 2015, he played in matches against a World XV in Cape Town. These matches have an equivalent status to international tour matches, but were played on home soil.)	2	(0)
2014–2015	Springboks	2	(0)
- Correct as of 4 February 2018
Medal record
Men's Rugby union
Representing South Africa
Rugby World Cup
Gold medal – first place	2007 France	Squad
Bronze medal – third place	2015 England	Squad

Jon-Paul Roger "JP" Pietersen (born 12 July 1986 in Stellenbosch, South Africa) is a South African former rugby union player for the Sharks in the Currie Cup. He generally played fullback or wing, but occasionally he played at outside centre. He played in 69 tests for the Springboks.

== Youth and early career ==
Pietersen was educated at the Hoërskool Generaal Hertzog in Witbank, but made his provincial debut with the Sharks as a 19-year-old during the 2005 Currie Cup season. His 2006 Super 14 season was disrupted by injuries but despite this, he was included in the South African under-21 team to compete at the 2006 Under 21 Rugby World Championship. South Africa made the final, but were defeated by the hosts, France.

== International career ==
Upon arriving back to South Africa after the under-21 World Championship he was named in the Springboks' 2006 Tri Nations Series squad where he debuted against New Zealand at the Royal Bafokeng Stadium in Rustenburg.

Pietersen's deceptive pace and gliding runs make him an unpredictable back-line player, with the ability to break the line at will and create attacking opportunities for his team. He is also a clinical finisher, and was the leading try scorer in the 2007 Super 14 competition with 12 tries from 15 games. Pietersen remains a firm fan favourite for the unpredictable and exciting dimension his play brings to the team. Before the emergence of François Steyn at the Sharks franchise, Pietersen was seen as the ideal replacement for Percy Montgomery as fullback, however with Steyn being able to play at fullback, wing or fly-half, Pietersen focused on wing as his primary position, and it is in this role that most of his appearances have been made for club and country.

He was selected into the Springboks 2007 Rugby World Cup squad. Starting in the first two matches, Pietersen scored three tries. He was impressive in the game against England, scoring two tries and setting up a third.

The top try-scorer in the 2007 Super 14 failed to score even one in 2008, a fact acknowledged by both AJ Venter and Stefan Terblanche in the October 2008 edition of SA Sports Illustrated.

Post-World Cup, Pietersen went on to establish a capped wing combination in Springbok with Bryan Habana, standing at 25 tests, ten more than next best, James Small and Jaques Olivier. Aside from his attacking abilities, Pietersen is widely regarded for his defence. His cover defence being the saving grace of the Springbok's 2008 End of Year Tour, keeping the Welsh at bay, and dominating his opposite Shane Williams. His all-round skills remain of the highest standard, maturing into one of the best wings since South Africa's readmission to international sport.

Pietersen was called up for South Africa's 2011 Rugby World Cup campaign starting the first game in a 17–16 victory for the Springboks against Wales. South Africa then thrashed Fiji 49–3 with Pietersen this time playing on the left wing. Pietersen did not play when South Africa thrashed Namibia 87–0. He started again on the right wing as South Africa squeezed past Samoa 13–5. South Africa were then through to the quarter-finals of the world cup. South Africa were then knocked out of the tournament losing 11–9 against Australia. He has also scored 4 tries in the 2015 world cup.

In April 2013, it was announced that he would play for Panasonic Wild Knights in the 2013–14 Top League in Japan, meaning he missed out on the Sharks' 2013 Currie Cup Premier Division campaign, but would return to the Sharks for the 2014 Super Rugby season.

Pietersen signed a three-year deal to join English Premiership side Leicester Tigers prior to the 2016–2017 season. However, as of 20 June 2017, Pieterson was granted early release from Welford Road to join top French club Toulon in the Top 14 from the 2017–18 season.
