= Mike Catt =

British Lions & England international rugby union player

Mike Catt OBE
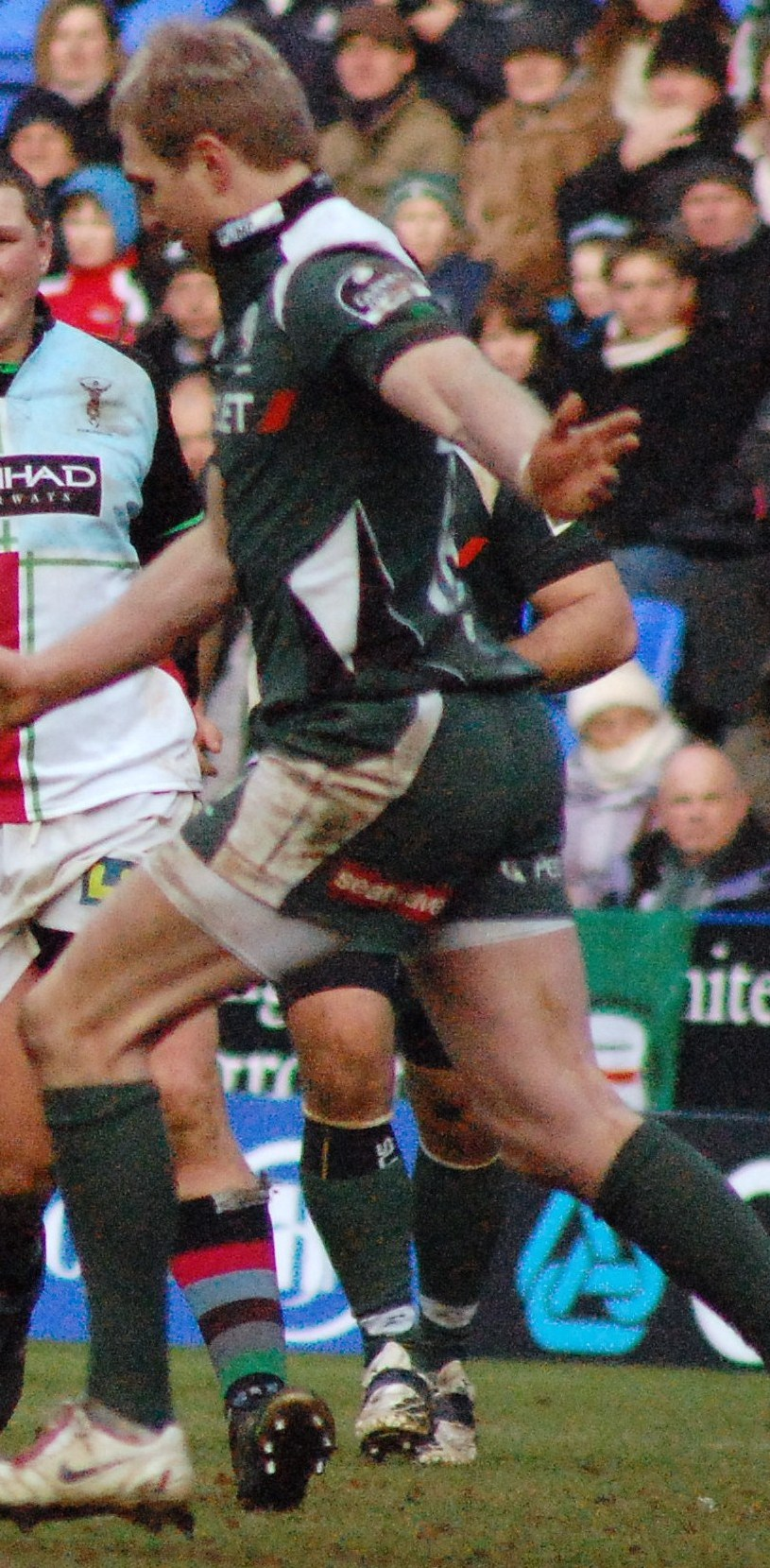
- Catt in 2010
- Born: Michael John Catt; 17 September 1971 (age 55) Port Elizabeth, South Africa
- Height: 5 ft 11 in (1.80 m)
- Weight: 13 st 8 lb (86 kg)
- School: Grey High School

Rugby union career
- Position(s): Fullback, Fly-half, Centre, Wing
Senior career
Years	Team	Apps	(Points)
1992–2004	Bath	227	(837)
2004–2010	London Irish	76	(61)
- Correct as of 10 July 2014
Provincial / State sides
Years	Team	Apps	(Points)
- Eastern Province
- Correct as of 10 July 2014
International career
Years	Team	Apps	(Points)
1994–2007	England	75	(142)
1997–2001	British & Irish Lions	1	(0)
- Correct as of 10 July 2014
Coaching career
- Years: Team
- 2008–2012: London Irish (Attack Coach)
- 2012–2015: England (Backs coach)
- 2016–2019: Italy (Attack coach)
- 2019–2024: Ireland (Attack coach)
- 2024–2025: NSW Waratahs (Attack coach)

Michael John Catt OBE (born 17 September 1971) is a South African-born former rugby union player who played for the England national rugby union team. He played professionally for the clubs London Irish and Bath. He earned 75 international caps for England and played in two World Cup Finals, in 2003 (when England won) and 2007. With his appearance in the October 2007 final, at age 36 years 1 month, he became the oldest ever player to play in a Rugby World Cup final. Since 2008, Catt has coached various rugby teams, and from 2019 to 2024 was assistant coach for the Ireland national rugby team. He is currently Attack Coach for the NSW Waratahs.

== Early life ==
Catt was born on 17 September 1971 in Port Elizabeth, South Africa. He attended Grey High School in Port Elizabeth until 1989 and represented Eastern Province at rugby union. His mother Anne was English, through whom he qualified to play for England later on, and as a student he toured England. At the time, South Africa was banned from international competition because of the country's apartheid policy. He moved to England after leaving school.

== Club career ==
Catt joined Bath in 1992 as understudy to Stuart Barnes and made his debut as a 21-year-old against Nottingham R.F.C. later the same year. He started for Bath in the victorious 1998 Heineken Cup Final as they defeated Brive. He had a testimonial year with Bath in 2004, but at the end of the 2003–04 season, Bath decided not to renew his contract and he moved to London Irish. At the start of the 2007–08 season, he announced he was going to be backs coach for London Irish as well as a player. Whilst with the Exiles, he enjoyed a fruitful twilight of his career and in May 2006 was named Guinness Premiership Player of the Season. He is the oldest ever player to play in an English Premiership final (May 2009), aged 37, when he was a player / coach at London Irish.

On 8 May 2010 he played the final competitive club match of his career. Already a Member of the Order of the British Empire (MBE), he was appointed Officer of the Order of the British Empire (OBE) in the 2011 New Year Honours for services to rugby.

== International career ==
A utility back, Catt played for England at fullback, fly-half, inside centre and even wing, and was part of the England side that won the 2003 Rugby World Cup.

His international debut came against Wales as a replacement for Rob Andrew. His breakthrough performance, however, came in England's following match against Canada at Twickenham Stadium, where he came on as an injury-replacement for the incumbent England fullback Paul Hull. England's emphatic victory, Hull's untimely injury, and Catt's impact in the late stages of the game cemented Catt as the new darling of English rugby that season.

Playing at full back, Catt was part of England's 1995 Grand Slam winning side, and played in the 1995 Rugby World Cup. In that event, he was memorably "posterised" by a young Jonah Lomu, who ran over him on the way to one of his four tries for the All Blacks in their semifinal win over England.

Catt was called up as an injury replacement in the 1997 British Lions tour to South Africa and played in the final test. At the time the England squad (excluding the substantial number who were with the Lions) were touring Argentina, where Catt was showing excellent form.

For some of his international career, his inclusion was questioned in some quarters. He was booed when he missed a penalty against Australia in 1998 at Twickenham that could have won the match; Australia won by 1 point. Ultimately though his natural ability as a rugby player has provided more positive career notes than negatives.

In 2000, with the retirement of centres after the 1999 World Cup, his career was revived when he stepped into midfield. Acting as an inside centre, with Jonny Wilkinson his kicking and distribution was responsible for the high try counts of that year.

Catt was selected for the 2001 British & Irish Lions tour to Australia but was injured and replaced by Scott Gibbs.

Catt was selected in the squad that won the 2003 World Cup; a move some saw as the one surprise selection in Clive Woodward's squad. After featuring in pool games against Samoa and Uruguay, Catt was brought on as a half time substitute in England's quarter-final against Wales, with England trailing 10–3. As a tactical substitution to improve England's kicking options and reduce the pressure on Jonny Wilkinson, Catt's performance was seen by many as key to England's improved second half showing and eventual 28–17 victory. In the semi-final against France, Catt was selected to start at inside centre as a tactical move, and due to his performance against Wales. He played in the extra-time period in the final as a replacement for Mike Tindall, alongside Wilkinson and Will Greenwood in England's midfield. Catt made several breaks in the extra-time period, and kicked the ball into touch to bring about the final whistle, ending the game and confirming England as world champions.

In 2006, he received an England recall, making his first Test appearances for two years on the summer tour to Australia, cementing his place in England's top ten most capped players. He had been in international exile until he was called up to captain England in the 2007 Six Nations game against France at Twickenham. England, with regular captain Phil Vickery and fly-half Jonny Wilkinson out to injury, won the match 26–18. He also captained England in the Six Nations defeat to Wales at the Millennium Stadium and again in England's pre-World Cup defeat to France at Twickenham in August 2007.

Catt was included in Brian Ashton's England squad for the 2007 Rugby World Cup, where he helped England reach a second successive final. Catt brought out his own autobiography after the World Cup "Landing on My Feet: My Story".

Catt confirmed his retirement from international rugby on 27 October 2007, the week after England lost to South Africa in that year's World Cup.

== Coaching career ==
Catt's coaching career began in 2008, where he replaced Brian Smith as attack coach at London Irish; he acted as a player-coach for the 2008–10 season. When he fully retired from playing at the end of the 2009–10 season, he remained with the London Irish set-up until Smith returned to the club in 2012.

In 2012, Catt joined the England national set-up as backs/attack coach for their 2012 tour to South Africa. On 15 December 2015, following the resignation of head coach Stuart Lancaster on 11 November 2015, newly appointed head coach Eddie Jones sacked the whole coaching team.

On 25 March 2016, Catt was announced as part of the newly appointed Italy coaching staff, sharing duties with Conor O'Shea and Stephen Aboud.

On 24 June 2019, it was confirmed after the 2019 Rugby World Cup, Catt will be joining former England player and coach Andy Farrell's coaching team at Ireland; after Joe Schmidt, the current head coach, steps down. Catt said: "I am looking forward to RWC in Japan and seeing the group of players we have here in Italy fulfil their potential and achieve the objectives we have set for ourselves. Obviously it is an honour to be given this future opportunity with Ireland but I will focus on that challenge only after I have given my all for Italy and this group of players".

As of February 2023, England's coaching group during the 2015 Rugby World Cup are all employed in Ireland – Andy Farrell (Ireland head coach), Stuart Lancaster (Connacht Rugby head coach), Graham Rowntree (Munster Rugby head coach) and Mike Catt (Ireland attack coach). Catt left Ireland after the 2024 Summer Tour to South Africa.

On 5 August 2024, it was announced Catt was joining the NSW Waratahs as Attack Coach.

== Honours ==
Bath

- Premiership 1992–93, 1993–94, 1995–96
- Anglo-Welsh Cup 1994, 1995, 1996
- European Rugby Champions Cup 1998

England

- Six Nations 1995, 1996, 2000, 2001, 2003
- World Cup 2003

Lions

- South Africa 1997 Winner
- Australia 2001 Tourist

Ireland

- Six Nations 2023 (Grand Slam), 2024
