= Peter Richards =

England international rugby union footballer

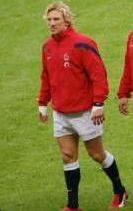
- Born: Peter Charles Richards; 10 March 1978 (age 48) Portsmouth, England
- Height: 1.75 m (5 ft 9 in)
- Weight: 88 kg (13 st 12 lb)
- School: Royal Hospital School; Lord Wandsworth College

Rugby union career
- Position(s): Scrum-half, Centre, Fly-half
Senior career
Years	Team	Apps	(Points)
1996–1999	London Irish		
1999–2001	Harlequins		
2001–2002	Benetton Treviso		
2002–2003	Bristol Shoguns		
2003–2005	London Wasps		
2005–2007	Gloucester		
2007–2010	London Irish		
International career
Years	Team	Apps	(Points)
2004–2010	England Saxons		
2006–2008	England	13	(0)
National sevens team
Years	Team		Comps
2004–06	England		Hong Kong

Peter Charles Richards (born 10 March 1978) is a former English rugby union player. A versatile player, he has played in three positions: scrum half (his preferred role), fly-half and centre. Richards retired in the summer of 2010 because of a back injury. As of May 2015, Richards became head coach at London Scottish.

== Early life ==
Born 10 March 1978 in Portsmouth, Richards began playing mini rugby at Farnham Rugby Club, before he went to the Royal Hospital School, near Ipswich.

== Early career ==
Richards moved to Lord Wandsworth College, Hampshire for sixth form and played alongside Jonny Wilkinson reaching the Daily Mail Semi-final in 1996. He featured in both the England U16 and U18 Group Schools teams before joining London Irish in 1996.

== Club career ==
Richards quickly made his first team debut for London Irish against Leicester Tigers before joining Harlequins for the 1999–2000 season.

He left two years later and spent a year in Italy playing for Benetton Treviso, then returned to join Bristol Shoguns. He moved again, to Wasps at the start of the 2003–04 season, when the Shoguns were relegated from the Zurich Premiership. He was a replacement when Wasps won both the 2003–04 Premiership Final and the 2004 Heineken Cup Final.

In summer 2005, Richards moved to Gloucester Rugby to replace Andy Gomarsall. He re-signed with London Irish at the start of the 2007–08 season.

== International career ==
Richards has represented England at U19, U21 and A level.

He was part of the England "Tour of Hell" in 1998 to Australia and New Zealand when he played against the New Zealand Māori. He angered head coach Clive Woodward by going to nightclubs in Sydney and Auckland, which had a detrimental result on his performance during training sessions. He came home before the final leg to South Africa, and Woodward never called him up to the squad again while he was coach.

In 2004 he was part of the winning England team at the Hong Kong Sevens. This decision paid off when he was named in Andy Robinson's 2005 Autumn test squad, though he did not feature in any of the games.

Richards was included in England's 2006 Tour of Australia and won his first Test cap against the Wallabies in a game which Australia beat England 34–3. Richards won his second cap in the second game of the tour in which the Wallabies triumphed again in a 43–18 victory.

He took part in the 2007 Rugby World Cup in France, coming on as a replacement in the Final, and other games.

He was picked for the 2008 Six Nations Championship but was then ruled out of the whole tournament after tearing a biceps muscle while playing for London Irish against Benetton Treviso.

On 19 May 2010, Richards announced his retirement from rugby due to injury, saying "I've had a great career and thoroughly enjoyed my rugby wherever I've played. I would like to have continued on for another couple of seasons, unfortunately that is not going to be physically possible. I would like to thank all the players, coaches and management and supporters at all the clubs I've played with for their help, friendship and encouragement."
