= Josh Lewsey =

British Lions & England international rugby union player

Josh Lewsey MBE
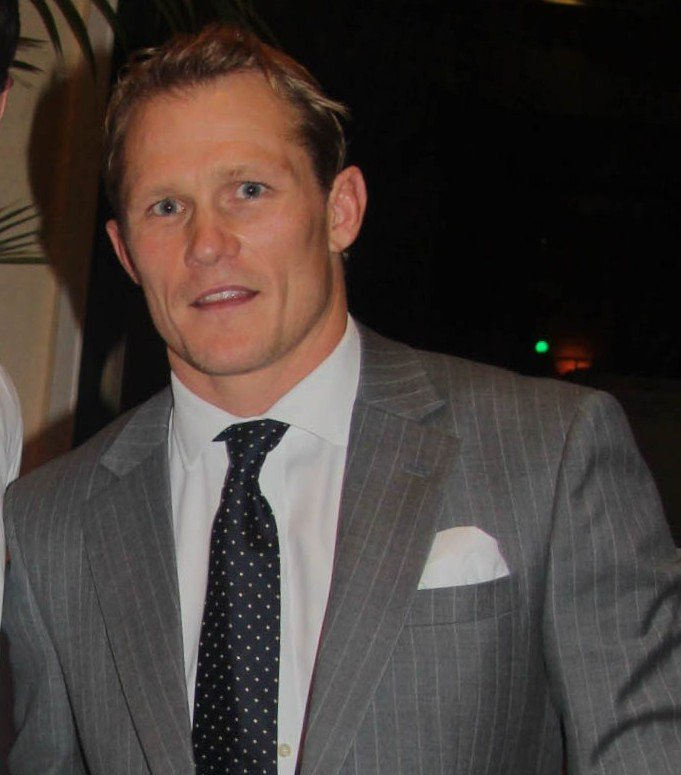
- Born: Owen Joshua Lewsey; 30 November 1976 (age 49) Bromley, London, England
- Height: 1.80 m (5 ft 11 in)
- Weight: 87 kg (13 st 10 lb)
- School: Watford Boys Grammar School
- University: Bristol University

Rugby union career
- Position(s): Fullback, Wing, Centre
Amateur team(s)
Years	Team	Apps	(Points)
- Amersham & Chiltern RFC
–	Bristol		
–	Wasps		
–	Old Fullerians RFC		
Senior career
Years	Team	Apps	(Points)
1997-1998	Bristol	17	(36)
1998-2009, 2011	London Wasps	186	(255)
International career
Years	Team	Apps	(Points)
1998-2008	England	55	(110)
2005	British & Irish Lions	3	(0)
- Correct as of 1 September 2006
National sevens team
Years	Team		Comps
2002-2008	England		
- Correct as of 1 September 2006

Owen Joshua Lewsey MBE (born 30 November 1976) is an English former rugby union player who represented England and the British and Irish Lions. Lewsey is a former British Army officer.

== Background and early life ==
Lewsey was born in Bromley, London to Welsh and Half-Welsh parents, but spent most of his childhood in the Hertfordshire village of Sarratt and spent his early years at Sarratt Church of England primary school. He subsequently attended Watford Grammar School for Boys and then attended the University of Bristol on a British Army bursary, graduating in 1998, and lived in the same hall of residence as three-time Olympian sailor Iain Percy; he was able to graduate after obtaining special permission to take his final exams in Australia as he had been selected for England's 1998 "Tour of Hell" in the Southern Hemisphere. In 2009 he was awarded a Doctor of Laws (LL.D) honoris causa by the university.

== Military ==
Lewsey graduated from the Royal Military Academy Sandhurst in 2001 and was commissioned as a troop commander into the Royal Artillery.

== Rugby career ==
While at school he played for the Amersham and Chiltern Rugby Football Club and also Fullerians RFC as a pupil of Watford Grammar Boys’ Grammar School. He first played for Wasps at eighteen in their Colts side, before being selected for their senior team. In that season he made his first appearance for England, in the U19s against Italy.

During his time at university, Lewsey combined his studies with playing professionally for Bristol RFC. He then rejoined London Wasps at the age of twenty-one after completing his degree. He won his first full England caps in 1998 against New Zealand and then South Africa.

In the following years, he was a member of the successful Wasps side that won 12 trophies, starting with the Tetley's Bitter Cup in 1999, in the final of which he scored a try. The following year Wasps retained the cup, and in the 2000 final he again scored a try this time against Northampton, having spent the morning at Sandhurst with his platoon on routine room inspection, block cleaning and parade drill.

Amongst his 12 trophies at Wasps were four Premiership titles in 2003, 2004, 2005 and 2008. Lewsey played in all four finals, and scored two tries in the 2003 final and one in the 2008 final. He also played in the victorious 2004 and 2007 Heineken Cup finals.

After a good run of form with the national team, he scored 11 tries at the 2007 Middlesex 7s to help Wasps win their first Middlesex 7s title since 1993. He became the tournament's top try and points scorer.

On 5 April 2009, Lewsey announced that he would retire from rugby at the end of the 2008/09 season. That year with Wasps he won Player of the Year, but was not selected for the 2009 British & Irish Lions team for the tour to South Africa.

=== International ===
Lewsey appeared for England in all three tests in the 2001 North American tour, and was a member of the England side that won the Hong Kong Sevens in 2002. He also represented England in sevens at the 2002 Commonwealth Games, opting to play in the tournament over touring Argentina with the National team.

Lewsey made his England home debut in the Six Nations Championship in 2003 after an injury to Jason Robinson. He scored twice in a 40–5 win over Italy. He followed this with the opening try in his next game against Scotland, and was part of the Grand Slam winning side. He had a key part in the tests against New Zealand and Australia on the June 2003 Southern-hemisphere tour. By then he was first-choice full-back, Robinson having moved to wing. He was a part of the 2003 World Cup winning squad, and scored five tries in the 111–13 defeat of Uruguay.

He was selected for the 2005 British & Irish Lions tour to New Zealand. He made an ideal start scoring two tries in the first five minutes against Bay of Plenty. Lewsey was widely viewed as a standout player for the Lions, despite the team's poor results. Lewsey continued to be an integral part of the England team at the 2006 Six Nations.

Lewsey featured heavily in England's campaign to retain the Rugby World Cup in 2007, playing in every game en route to the final. He scored the only try against France in the 14–9 victory which put England into the last two. However, just before half-time in the same match he picked up a hamstring injury which ruled him out of the final. That semi final was to be his last game for England.

England's coach Brian Ashton did not select Lewsey for the England squad to compete in the 2008 Six Nations squad. However, he was called up for Martin Johnson's England Squad for 2008/2009, but was not selected to play.

On 10 December 2008 Lewsey announced his retirement from international rugby to concentrate on his club career, ending his time in the England set-up, which spanned more than 10 years and claiming 55 caps with 22 tries scored.

Due to his parentage Lewsey also qualified to play for Wales but chose to represent England as he had received a call-up from them first. His mother is from the Swansea Valley area while his father is half Welsh.

== Post rugby career ==
Post rugby career, in September 2011, Lewsey joined Citigroup Global Markets Ltd.

In March 2013, Lewsey joined the Cornish Pirates as the temporary acting chief executive of the rugby club. Then, during August 2013, Lewsey stepped down from the Penzance, Cornish rugby team and was appointed as the Head of Welsh Rugby as part of the executive board of the WRU in Wales, he replaced Joe Lydon who was in the role since 2008. Lewsey continued in the role for 2 years until January 2016 when he stepped down.

Following a few years of working in rugby management, in 2017 Lewsey moved to the business sector and joined Ernst & Young as People Advisory Services Leader. Lewsey transferred to Hong Kong, where he became the CEO of Teneo+, as of 2021. When Teneo+ ceased to exist he decided to move back to the UK. On 12 June 2025 Lewsey was appointed group strategy and corporate development officer at Brooks Macdonald, a UK wealth management firm.
