= Phil Vickery (rugby union) =

British Lions & England international rugby union footballer

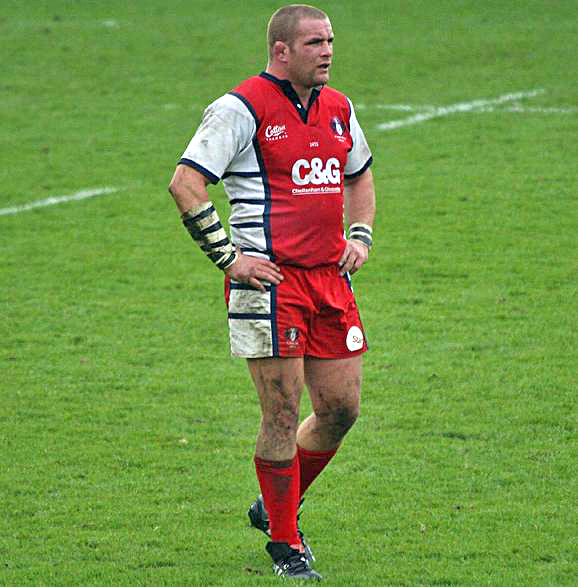
- Born: Philip John Vickery; 14 March 1976 (age 50) Barnstaple, Devon, England
- Height: 6 ft 3 in (1.90 m)
- Weight: 19 st 10 lb (125 kg 275 lb)

Rugby union career
- Position: Prop
Senior career
Years	Team	Apps	(Points)
1995–2006	Gloucester Rugby	145	(20)
2006–2010	London Wasps	54	(5)
- Correct as of 14 December 2010
International career
Years	Team	Apps	(Points)
1998–2010	England	73	(10)
2001, 2009	British & Irish Lions	5	(0)
- Correct as of 14 July 2009

Philip John Vickery MBE DL (born 14 March 1976) is an English former rugby union player. A tighthead prop he won 73 international caps for England squad and was a member of England's World Cup winning squad in 2003, playing in all seven matches in the tournament.

Vickery ended his club rugby career at London Wasps, joining the London side in 2006 after eleven years with Gloucester Rugby.

Given the nickname "Raging Bull", he played in three Rugby World Cups, including as England captain in the 2007 tournament, and toured Australia and South Africa with the British & Irish Lions.

== Early years ==
The son of a dairy farmer, Vickery was born to Cornish parents in Barnstaple, Devon, England and says he is proud to be a Cornishman and an Englishman. Educated at Budehaven School, his interest in sport developed as a youngster, and by age 12 he started playing rugby. By the age of 16 he gained his first National Representative honour, being picked for the England Schools U16s group.

Vickery left school age 16 and worked as a herdsman on his parents' farm. He remains a qualified cattle inseminator.

Vickery has an Oriental tattoo on his left shoulder which roughly translates to "I'll fight you to the death", and a bulldog tattoo on his right.

== Career ==
He started with the Cornish club Bude, then moved to Redruth, during which time he first appeared in an England Colts side. In 1995, England 'A' coach Richard Hill persuaded the 19-year-old Vickery to join Gloucester Rugby, where he became known as "The Raging Bull". Whilst at Gloucester he started in the 2002 Zurich Championship Final (the year before winning the play-offs constituted winning the English title) in which Gloucester defeated Bristol Rugby. The following year he missed their 2003 Powergen Cup Final triumph through injury.

His representative career went from strength to strength, with appearances for England U21s and Colts in the 1996–97 season.

In April 2006 he announced he was quitting Gloucester Rugby after 11 years and signed for Wasps in a 3-year deal. Vickery made his Wasps debut in their 23 – 13 win over London Irish on 8 October 2006. With Wasps he won both the Heineken Cup in 2007 and the 2008 Guinness Premiership title.

On 28 October 2010, Vickery was forced to retire from rugby after suffering from several neck injuries. He played his last game at Kingsholm against Gloucester on 25 September, which is where he started his career.

On 28 May 2012 Worcester Warriors announced that Vickery would join the club as their new Assistant Forwards (Scrum) coach for the forthcoming 2012–2013 season. After an unsuccessful season, Worcester made wholesale changes in the coaching staff, from head coach through the assistants, and Vickery was one of the casualties.

== Representative career ==
Vickery made his England debut against Wales aged 21 on 21 February 1998, coming off the bench to replace Darren Garforth against Wales at Twickenham in the Five Nations tournament, a match England won 60–26. It was the completion of a rapid rise through the England set-up, after only 34 first team games for his club and just 81 days after his England A debut.

The Tour from Hell

Summer 1998 saw Vickery taking part in the tour of the Southern Hemisphere, part of an England squad which had been severely weakened by injury and player unavailability. In the space of a month, England were soundly defeated by Australia (76–0 in Brisbane on 6 June), twice by New Zealand (64–22 in Dunedin on 20 June and 40–10 in Auckland on 27 June) and finally by South Africa (18–0 in Cape Town on 4 July). There were also losses to New Zealand 'A', New Zealand Rugby Academy, and New Zealand Māori.

The tour had benefits for some players, bringing through future stars of the England side such as Vickery himself, Jonny Wilkinson, Danny Grewcock, Graham Rowntree, Austin Healey, Matt Dawson and Matt Perry, others effectively had their international careers ended. Steve Ravenscroft, Rob Fidler, Jos Baxendell, Spencer Brown and Tom Beim each gained two caps on the tour. Richard Pool-Jones, Scott Benton, Dominic Chapman and Stuart Potter only played once for England, on the Tour From Hell.

Vickery recovered from a neck injury in April 1999 and played in that year's Rugby World Cup. A shoulder injury, however, kept him out of the 2000 South Africa tour. Vickery toured Australia with the British & Irish Lions in 2001 and played in all three tests.

Vickery was appointed captain of the England squad that toured Argentina in 2002. With many of the top players rested, Vickery led the side to victory against The Pumas in Buenos Aires.

Vickery missed the 2003 Six Nations tournament because of a back injury, but having returned to the team he did well for England on the road to the 2003 World Cup. He played in all seven games in the tournament, which was won by England, and captained the side against Uruguay. He scored his first international try when he came off the bench against Samoa in England's third game of the tournament.

A rib injury prevented him from captaining the non-capped match against the New Zealand Barbarians in December 2003. Although he took a full part in the 2004 Six Nations, another back operation in May ruled him out of the summer tour to New Zealand and Australia. He returned to rugby only in late October 2004.

Making his international comeback, he came on as a replacement against South Africa for the first Autumn Test between the two sides on 18 November 2006. After playing well, he drove over to score the winning try, which was converted by Andy Goode, and England won their first game since February that year.

He was selected on 2 January by new England head coach Brian Ashton to captain the side during the 2007 Six Nations Championship and 2007 Rugby World Cup. He was one of only four players to have started both the 2003 and 2007 RWC Finals, the other three being Jonny Wilkinson, Jason Robinson and Ben Kay.

Also, on 8 January 2008 he was selected in the squad for the 2008 Six Nations Championship by Brian Ashton. He played every game except for the 23–19 win over Italy which he missed through injury. He was selected to tour South Africa with the 2009 British & Irish Lions, starting the first and third test. He took a merciless pounding from Tendai Mtawarira in the first test in particular, probably the worst of his career. To his credit, he performed admirably in the third test when he replaced the injured Adam Jones to start.

== Personal life ==
He was a co-commentator for ITV's coverage of the 2011 Rugby World Cup.

Vickery won the 2011 series of Celebrity Masterchef beating Kirsty Wark and Nick Pickard in the final.

He was appointed a Deputy Lieutenant of Gloucestershire in 2015.

Sporting positions
Preceded by Neil Back; Martin Johnson; Martin Corry; Jonny Wilkinson; Mike Catt; Martin Corry; Steve Borthwick	England national rugby union team captain Jun 2002; Nov 2003; Feb 2007; Aug 2007; Aug–Sep 2007; Oct 2007 – Feb 2008; Feb–Mar 2008	Succeeded by Martin Johnson; Martin Johnson; Mike Catt; Mike Catt; Martin Corry; Steve Borthwick; Steve Borthwick
