= Joe Worsley =

British Lions & England international rugby union player

Joe Worsley MBE
- Born: Joseph Paul Richard Daniel Worsley; 14 June 1977 (age 49) London, England
- Height: 1.96 m (6 ft 5 in)
- Weight: 110 kg (17 st 5 lb; 243 lb)
- School: Hitchin Boys' School
- University: Brunel University

Rugby union career
- Position(s): Flanker, Number Eight
Senior career
Years	Team	Apps	(Points)
1993–2011	London Wasps	275	(195)
International career
Years	Team	Apps	(Points)
1999–2011	England	78	(50)
2009	British and Irish Lions	1	(0)
- Correct as of 3 February 2011

Joseph Paul Richard Worsley, MBE (born 14 June 1977) is a retired English rugby union player who played flanker for Wasps and England.

== Biography ==
Worsley was born in London and educated at Hitchin Boys' School and Brunel University. He joined London Wasps at the age of 16 from Welwyn RFC. He went on to help Wasps win the Anglo-Welsh Cup in 1999 and 2000. He became the youngest player to represent England U21s, after being a member of the England Schools 18 Group Grand Slam team in 1994–95. Amongst his trophies at Wasps were four Premiership titles in 2003, 2004, 2005 and 2008. Worsley played in all four finals, scoring a try in 2003. He also played in the victorious 2004 and 2007 Heineken Cup finals.

Worsley is noted for his defensive capabilities against opposing ball-carriers. His ability to play any of the three back row positions earned him a place in the England World Cup Squad in 1999 as a bench replacement. He won his first cap against Tonga at the World Cup, then came on as a replacement against both Scotland and Italy during England's Six Nations Championship matches in 2000. He won two more caps as a replacement in that summer's Tests against South Africa in Pretoria and Bloemfontein. He enjoyed a successful tour to North America in the summer of 2001, filling Lawrence Dallaglio's number 8 position and scoring against both Canada and the United States.

He continued in the back row for England's 2001 Investec Challenge matches, when he turned in two outstanding performances against Australia and South Africa. He also replaced Richard Hill in both of England's 2003 tour matches against New Zealand and Australia.

His 2002–03 season started well, and Worsley won the Man of The Match award against Saracens in September. However, a hamstring injury, forced him out of the England Autumn Internationals and six weeks of the Zurich Premiership. He scored England's second try in their win over Wales at Cardiff in 2003, just eight days after scoring against France A for England A at Northampton, and being voted man of the match. Worsley was a member of England's victorious Rugby World Cup squad in 2003, coming on during the pool match against South Africa and starting against both Samoa and Uruguay.

In 2004 he played against Italy, Ireland and France in the Six Nations Championship, as well as coming off the bench against Wales to score a match winning try. Worsley played powerfully against both South Africa and Australia in November 2004. He started in the back row, now an automatic choice after former England captain Lawrence Dallaglio retired from England duty two months earlier. He was a member of the London Wasps side that won both the Zurich Premiership final and the Heineken European Cup Final in 2004 and he played well on the summer tour to New Zealand and Australia. He missed out on England's entire 2005 Autumn test series due to a knee injury but regained full fitness in time for the 2006 Six nations championship. Worsley participated in the 2007 Rugby World Cup. He made a "try-saving tap-tackle" which prevented Vincent Clerc of France from scoring a probable match-winning try late in the semi-final (13 October). Worsley toured New Zealand in June 2008, coming on as a substitute in both Tests, and was named as a replacement for Tom Rees in the shadow of the 2009 Six Nations, and began as a replacement against Italy.

He then restarted his international career, starting in front of Steffon Armitage against Wales, and proving his worth, earning man of the match. He played on the Lions 2009 tour of South Africa in front of any other English flankers other than Tom Croft. On 1 August 2011 it was announced that Worsley had been cut from England's training squad due to injury and would probably miss the 2011 Rugby World Cup. On 14 November 2011 it was announced that Worsley would be forced to retire due to a neck injury.

Worsley was defence coach of French top 14 team Castres Olympique.

Worsley moved to CA Brive again as defence coach

Joe Worsley, alongside Eggchasers Podcast and channel host Tim Cocker, created a YouTube account FR- UK to promote French domestic club rugby in the UK and Ireland. In June 2025, the channel purchased the rights for the remaining fixtures for the 2024–25 Rugby Pro D2 season as well as the rights for the 2025-2026 season.

== Charitable work ==
He is an Honorary President of the rugby charity Wooden Spoon improving the lives of disadvantaged children and young people in Britain and Ireland.

He has also started actively participating in rugby classes for the Alex Boys academy, helping disadvantaged children learn rugby of which he is a keen advocate.
