= 2002 Tri Nations Series =

Rugby competition

Final positions
- Champions: New Zealand (4th title)
- Bledisloe Cup: Australia
- Mandela Challenge Plate: South Africa

Tournament statistics
- Matches played: 6
- Tries scored: 32 (5.33 per match)
- Attendance: 306,764 (51,127 per match)

The 2002 Tri Nations Series was contested from 13 July to 17 August between the Australia, New Zealand and South Africa national rugby union teams. The All Blacks won the tournament.

South Africa won their first Mandela Challenge Plate in a one-off home test against Australia. Australia made it 5 wins in a row in the Bledisloe Cup, having taken it from New Zealand in 1998. As of 2025, this was the last time that Australia won the Bledisloe Cup.

== Table ==
Place	Nation	Games				Points			Try bonus	Losing bonus	Table points
Place	Nation	Played	Won	Drawn	Lost	For	Against	Diff	Try bonus	Losing bonus	Table points
1	New Zealand	4	3	0	1	97	65	+32	2	1	15
2	Australia	4	2	0	2	91	86	+5	1	2	11
3	South Africa	4	1	0	3	103	140	−37	2	1	7

== Results ==
=== Round 1 ===
13 July 2002
19:35 NZST (UTC+12)

New Zealand	12–6	Australia (1 BP)
Pen: Mehrtens (4)		Pen: Burke (2)

Lancaster Park, Christchurch
Attendance: 36,500
Referee: Jonathan Kaplan (South Africa)

FB	15	Christian Cullen
RW	14	Doug Howlett
OC	13	Mark Robinson
IC	12	Aaron Mauger
LW	11	Caleb Ralph
FH	10	Andrew Mehrtens
SH	9	Justin Marshall
N8	8	Scott Robertson
OF	7	Richie McCaw
BF	6	Reuben Thorne (c)
RL	5	Simon Maling
LL	4	Chris Jack
TP	3	Greg Somerville
HK	2	Mark Hammett
LP	1	Dave Hewett
Replacements:
HK	16	Tom Willis
PR	17	Joe McDonnell
LK	18	Royce Willis
LF	19	Sam Broomhall
SH	20	Byron Kelleher
FH	21	Dan Carter
FB	22	Ben Blair
Coach:
John Mitchell

FB	15	Chris Latham
RW	14	Ben Tune
OC	13	Matt Burke
IC	12	Daniel Herbert
LW	11	Stirling Mortlock
FH	10	Stephen Larkham
SH	9	George Gregan (c)
N8	8	Toutai Kefu
OF	7	George Smith
BF	6	Owen Finegan
RL	5	Justin Harrison
LL	4	Nathan Sharpe
TP	3	Patricio Noriega
HK	2	Jeremy Paul
LP	1	Bill Young
Replacements:
HK	16	Brendan Cannon
PR	17	Ben Darwin
LK	18	Matt Cockbain
N8	19	David Lyons
SH	20	Chris Whitaker
FH	21	Elton Flatley
FB	22	Mat Rogers
Coach:
Eddie Jones

=== Round 2 ===
20 July 2002
19:35 NZST (UTC+12)

(1 BP) New Zealand	41–20	South Africa
Try: Hammett; Howlett; Marshall; Robertson; Thorne; Con: Mehrtens (2); Pen: Mehrtens (3); Drop: Mehrtens		Try: Greeff; Joubert; Con: Pretorius (2); Pen: Pretorius; Drop: Greeff

Wellington Regional Stadium, Wellington
Attendance: 37,693
Referee: Stuart Dickinson (Australia)

FB	15	Christian Cullen
RW	14	Doug Howlett
OC	13	Mark Robinson
IC	12	Aaron Mauger
LW	11	Caleb Ralph
FH	10	Andrew Mehrtens
SH	9	Justin Marshall
N8	8	Scott Robertson
OF	7	Richie McCaw
BF	6	Reuben Thorne (c)
RL	5	Simon Maling
LL	4	Chris Jack
TP	3	Greg Somerville
HK	2	Mark Hammett
LP	1	Dave Hewett
Replacements:
HK	16	Tom Willis
PR	17	Joe McDonnell
LK	18	Royce Willis
LF	19	Sam Broomhall
SH	20	Byron Kelleher
CE	21	Tana Umaga
WG	22	Jonah Lomu
Coach:
John Mitchell

FB	15	Werner Greeff
RW	14	Stefan Terblanche
OC	13	Marius Joubert
IC	12	De Wet Barry
LW	11	Dean Hall
FH	10	André Pretorius
SH	9	Bolla Conradie
N8	8	Bobby Skinstad
BF	7	Joe van Niekerk
OF	6	Corné Krige (c)
RL	5	Jannes Labuschagne
LL	4	Victor Matfield
TP	3	Willie Meyer
HK	2	James Dalton
LP	1	Lawrence Sephaka
Replacements:
PR	16	Ollie le Roux
PR	17	Faan Rautenbach
LK	18	AJ Venter
FL	19	Hendro Scholtz
SH	20	Neil de Kock
CE	21	Adrian Jacobs
WG	22	Breyton Paulse
Coach:
Rudolf Straeuli

=== Round 3 ===
27 July 2002
20:00 AEST (UTC+10)

(1 BP) Australia	38–27	South Africa (1 BP)
Try: Latham (2); Tune; Mortlock; Con: Burke (3); Pen: Burke (3); Mortlock		Try: Joubert (2); Skinstad; Russell; Con: Pretorius (2); Pen: Pretorius

The Gabba, Brisbane
Attendance: 37,528
Referee: Steve Lander (England)

FB	15	Chris Latham
RW	14	Ben Tune
OC	13	Matt Burke
IC	12	Daniel Herbert
LW	11	Stirling Mortlock
FH	10	Stephen Larkham
SH	9	George Gregan (c)
N8	8	Toutai Kefu
OF	7	George Smith
BF	6	Owen Finegan
RL	5	Justin Harrison
LL	4	Nathan Sharpe
TP	3	Patricio Noriega
HK	2	Jeremy Paul
LP	1	Bill Young
Replacements:
HK	16	Brendan Cannon
PR	17	Ben Darwin
LK	18	Matt Cockbain
N8	19	David Lyons
SH	20	Chris Whitaker
FH	21	Elton Flatley
FB	22	Mat Rogers
Coach:
Eddie Jones

FB	15	Werner Greeff
RW	14	Stefan Terblanche
OC	13	Marius Joubert
IC	12	De Wet Barry
LW	11	Breyton Paulse
FH	10	André Pretorius
SH	9	Bolla Conradie
N8	8	Bobby Skinstad
BF	7	Joe van Niekerk
OF	6	Corné Krige (c)
RL	5	Jannes Labuschagne
LL	4	Victor Matfield
TP	3	Faan Rautenbach
HK	2	James Dalton
LP	1	Lawrence Sephaka
Replacements:
HK	16	Delarey du Preez
PR	17	Ollie le Roux
LK	18	AJ Venter
FL	19	Hendro Scholtz
SH	20	Neil de Kock
CE	21	Adrian Jacobs
WG	22	Brent Russell
Coach:
Rudolf Straeuli

=== Round 4 ===
3 August 2002
20:00 AEST (UTC+10)

Australia	16–14	New Zealand (1 BP)
Try: Rogers; Sharpe; Pen: Burke (2)		Try: McCaw; Pen: Mehrtens (3)

Stadium Australia, Sydney
Attendance: 79,543
Referee: André Watson (South Africa)

FB	15	Chris Latham
RW	14	Ben Tune
OC	13	Matt Burke
IC	12	Daniel Herbert
LW	11	Stirling Mortlock
FH	10	Stephen Larkham
SH	9	George Gregan (c)
N8	8	Toutai Kefu
OF	7	George Smith
BF	6	Owen Finegan
RL	5	Justin Harrison
LL	4	Nathan Sharpe
TP	3	Patricio Noriega
HK	2	Jeremy Paul
LP	1	Bill Young
Replacements:
HK	16	Brendan Cannon
PR	17	Ben Darwin
LK	18	Matt Cockbain
N8	19	David Lyons
SH	20	Chris Whitaker
FH	21	Elton Flatley
FB	22	Mat Rogers
Coach:
Eddie Jones

FB	15	Christian Cullen
RW	14	Doug Howlett
OC	13	Tana Umaga
IC	12	Aaron Mauger
LW	11	Caleb Ralph
FH	10	Andrew Mehrtens
SH	9	Justin Marshall
N8	8	Scott Robertson
OF	7	Richie McCaw
BF	6	Reuben Thorne (c)
RL	5	Simon Maling
LL	4	Chris Jack
TP	3	Greg Somerville
HK	2	Tom Willis
LP	1	Dave Hewett
Replacements:
HK	16	Andrew Hore
PR	17	Joe McDonnell
FL	18	Marty Holah
LF	19	Sam Broomhall
SH	20	Byron Kelleher
CE	21	Daryl Gibson
FB	22	Leon MacDonald
Coach:
John Mitchell

=== Round 5 ===
10 August 2002
15:00 SAST (UTC+02)

(1 BP) South Africa	23–30	New Zealand (1 BP)
Try: De Kock 2'; Pretorius 32'; Con: Pretorius (2) 3', 33'; Pen: Pretorius (2) 27', 52'; Drop: Pretorius 57'		Try: MacDonald 4'; Penalty try 17'; Howlett 36'; Mauger 80'; Con: Mehrtens (2) 18', 80+1'; Pen: Mehrtens (2) 54', 70'

Kings Park Stadium, Durban
Attendance: 52,500
Referee: Dave McHugh (Ireland)

FB	15	Werner Greeff
RW	14	Breyton Paulse
OC	13	Marius Joubert
IC	12	De Wet Barry
LW	11	Dean Hall
FH	10	André Pretorius
SH	9	Neil de Kock
N8	8	Bobby Skinstad
BF	7	Joe van Niekerk
OF	6	Corné Krige (c)
RL	5	Jannes Labuschagne
LL	4	AJ Venter
TP	3	Willie Meyer
HK	2	James Dalton
LP	1	Lawrence Sephaka
Replacements:
PR	16	Ollie le Roux
PR	17	Faan Rautenbach
LK	18	Victor Matfield
FL	19	Hendro Scholtz
SH	20	Bolla Conradie
CE	21	Adrian Jacobs
WG	22	Brent Russell
Coach:
Rudolf Straeuli

FB	15	Leon MacDonald
RW	14	Doug Howlett
OC	13	Tana Umaga
IC	12	Aaron Mauger
LW	11	Caleb Ralph
FH	10	Andrew Mehrtens
SH	9	Justin Marshall
N8	8	Scott Robertson
OF	7	Richie McCaw
BF	6	Reuben Thorne (c)
RL	5	Simon Maling
LL	4	Chris Jack
TP	3	Greg Somerville
HK	2	Tom Willis
LP	1	Dave Hewett
Replacements:
HK	16	Mark Hammett
PR	17	Joe McDonnell
FL	18	Sam Broomhall
LF	19	Marty Holah
SH	20	Byron Kelleher
CE	21	Daryl Gibson
WG	22	Jonah Lomu
Coach:
John Mitchell

Referee McHugh had to be replaced in the 43rd minute after a drunk South African fan, Pieter van Zyl, ran onto the pitch and tackled him, leaving McHugh with a dislocated shoulder and having to be carried off on a stretcher. He was replaced by Chris White.

=== Round 6 ===
17 August 2002
15:00 SAST (UTC+02)

(1 BP) South Africa	33–31	Australia (1 BP)
Try: Paulse (2); Greeff; Russell; Van Niekerk; Con: Greeff (4)		Try: Kefu; Cannon; Rogers; Con: Burke (2); Pen: Burke (3); Drop: Gregan

Ellis Park Stadium, Johannesburg
Attendance: 63,000
Referee: Paddy O'Brien (New Zealand)

FB	15	Werner Greeff
RW	14	Breyton Paulse
OC	13	Marius Joubert
IC	12	De Wet Barry
LW	11	Dean Hall
FH	10	Brent Russell
SH	9	Neil de Kock
N8	8	Bobby Skinstad
BF	7	Joe van Niekerk
OF	6	Corné Krige (c)
RL	5	AJ Venter
LL	4	Jannes Labuschagne
TP	3	Willie Meyer
HK	2	James Dalton
LP	1	Lawrence Sephaka
Coach:
Rudolf Straeuli

FB	15	Chris Latham
RW	14	Ben Tune
OC	13	Matt Burke
IC	12	Daniel Herbert
LW	11	Stirling Mortlock
FH	10	Stephen Larkham
SH	9	George Gregan (c)
N8	8	Toutai Kefu
OF	7	George Smith
BF	6	Owen Finegan
RL	5	Justin Harrison
LL	4	Nathan Sharpe
TP	3	Ben Darwin
HK	2	Jeremy Paul
LP	1	Bill Young
Coach:
Eddie Jones
