= 2002 South Africa rugby union tour of Europe =

- Coach: Rudolf Straeuli
- Tour captain: Corné Krige
Summary
P	W	D	L
Total
3	0	0	3
Test match
3	0	0	3
Opponent
P	W	D	L
France
1	1	0	0
Scotland
1	1	0	0
England
1	1	0	0

The 2002 South Africa rugby union tour of France Scotland and England was a series of matches played by the South Africa national rugby union team in November 2002 in France, Scotland and England. The tour concluded with a 53–3 loss against England, which was the worst defeat in the history of the Springboks, until their 57-0 loss to New Zealand in 2017.

== Matches ==
9 November 2002

France	30–10	South Africa
Try: Clerc, Heymans; Con: Gelez; Pen: Gelez 5 Drop: Castaignède	Report	Try: Van Niekerk; Con: Pretorius; Pen: Pretorius

Stade Vélodrome, Marseille
Attendance: 57,000
Referee: Alain Rolland (Ireland)

France: 15. Nicolas Brusque, 14. Vincent Clerc, 13. Thomas Castaignède, 12. Damien Traille, 11. Cédric Heymans, 10. François Gelez, 9. Fabien Galthié (c), 8. Imanol Harinordoquy, 7. Olivier Magne, 6. Serge Betsen, 5. Olivier Brouzet, 4. Fabien Pelous, 3. Pieter de Villiers, 2. Raphaël Ibañez, 1. Jean-Jacques Crenca – Replacements: 16. Sylvain Marconnet, 17. Jean-Baptiste Rué, 18. Thibault Privat, 19. Sébastien Chabal, 22. Xavier Garbajosa – Unused: 20. Dimitri Yachvili, 21. Gérald Merceron
South Africa: 15. Werner Greeff, 14. Breyton Paulse, 13. Jean de Villiers, 12. Adrian Jacobs, 11. Brent Russell, 10. André Pretorius, 9. Neil de Kock, 8. Joe van Niekerk, 7. AJ Venter, 6. Corné Krige (c), 5. Jannes Labuschagne, 4. Bakkies Botha (yellow card) , 3. Willie Meyer, 2. James Dalton, 1. Lawrence Sephaka – Replacements: 16. Lukas van Biljon, 17. Wessel Roux, 18. Marco Wentzel, 19. Pedrie Wannenburg, 21. Butch James, 22. Marius Joubert – Unused: 20. Bolla Conradie

16 November 2002

Scotland	21–6	South Africa
Try: Pountney, Walker; Con: Laney; Pen: Laney 3	Report	Pen: James 2

Murrayfield Stadium, Edinburgh
Attendance: 58,000
Referee: Nigel Williams (Wales)

Scotland: 15. Stuart Moffat, 14. Nikki Walker, 13. Andy Craig, 12. Brendan Laney, 11. Chris Paterson, 10. Gordon Ross, 9. Bryan Redpath (c), 8. Budge Pountney, 7. Simon Taylor, 6. Martin Leslie, 5. Stuart Grimes, 4. Scott Murray, 3. Bruce Douglas, 2. Gordon Bulloch, 1. Tom Smith – Replacements: 17. Dave Hilton, 18. Nathan Hines, 19. Jason White, 21. Gregor Townsend, 22. Ben Hinshelwood – Unused: 16. Steve Scott, 20. Graeme Beveridge
South Africa: 15. Werner Greeff, 14. Breyton Paulse, 13. Adrian Jacobs, 12. Robbie Fleck, 11. Friedrich Lombard, 10. Butch James, 9. Bolla Conradie, 8. Joe van Niekerk, 7. Pierre Uys, 6. Corné Krige (c), 5. Jannes Labuschagne, 4. Marco Wentzel, 3. Deon Carstens, 2. Lukas van Biljon, 1. Wessel Roux – Replacements: 17. CJ van der Linde, 18. AJ Venter, 21. André Pretorius – Unused: 16. James Dalton, 19. Pedrie Wannenburg, 20. Brent Russell, 22. Bakkies Botha

23 November 2002

England	53–3	South Africa
Try: Back, Cohen; Dallaglio, Greenwood 2 Hill, Penalty try Con: Dawson, Gomarsall 2, Stimpson 2, Wilkinson; Pen: Wilkinson 2	Report	Pen: Pretorius

Twickenham Stadium, London
Attendance: 72,000
Referee: Paddy O'Brien (Ireland)

England: 15. Jason Robinson, 14. Ben Cohen, 13. Will Greenwood, 12. Mike Tindall, 11. Phil Christophers, 10. Jonny Wilkinson, 9. Matt Dawson, 8. Richard Hill, 7. Neil Back, 6. Lewis Moody, 5. Ben Kay, 4. Martin Johnson (c), 3. Phil Vickery, 2. Steve Thompson, 1. Jason Leonard, – Replacements: 18. Danny Grewcock, 19. Lawrence Dallaglio, 20. Andy Gomarsall, 21. Austin Healey, 22. Tim Stimpson – Unused: 16. Mark Regan, 17. Robbie Morris
South Africa: 15. Werner Greeff, 14. Breyton Paulse, 13. Robbie Fleck, 12. Butch James, 11. Friedrich Lombard, 10. André Pretorius, 9. Bolla Conradie, 8. Joe van Niekerk, 7. Pedrie Wannenburg, 6. Corné Krige (c), 5. AJ Venter, 4. Jannes Labuschagne (red card) , 3. Deon Carstens, 2. James Dalton, 1. Wessel Roux, – Replacements: 16. Lukas van Biljon, 17. CJ van der Linde, 20. Norman Jordaan, 21. Adrian Jacobs, 22. Brent Russell – Unused: 18. Marco Wentzel, 19. Pierre Uys
