= 2003 Rugby World Cup knockout stage =

The knockout stage at the 2003 Rugby World Cup featured the eight teams that qualified from the pool stage (the top two teams from each of the four pools), competing in a single-elimination tournament. The stage began with the quarter-final between New Zealand and South Africa in Melbourne on 8 November 2003, and concluded with the final between Australia and England at Stadium Australia in Sydney on 22 November. England won the final 20–17 after extra time, thanks to a last-minute drop goal from fly-half Jonny Wilkinson.

== Bracket ==
Quarter-finals
8 November – Melbourne
New Zealand	29
South Africa	9
8 November – Brisbane
Australia	33
Scotland	16
9 November – Melbourne
France	43
Ireland	21
9 November – Brisbane
England	28
Wales	17

Semi-finals
15 November – Sydney (Telstra)
New Zealand	10
Australia	22
16 November – Sydney (Telstra)
France	7
England	24

Final
22 November – Sydney (Telstra)
Australia	17
England (a.e.t.)	20
Third place
20 November – Sydney (Telstra)
New Zealand	40
France	13

== Quarter-finals ==
=== New Zealand vs South Africa ===
8 November 2003

New Zealand	29–9	South Africa
Try: MacDonald 16' c Mealamu 59' m Rokocoko 72' m Con: MacDonald; Pen: MacDonald (3); Drop: Mauger 45'	Report	Pen: Hougaard (3)

Docklands Stadium, Melbourne
Attendance: 40,734
Referee: Tony Spreadbury (England)

FB	15	Mils Muliaina
RW	14	Doug Howlett
OC	13	Leon MacDonald
IC	12	Aaron Mauger
LW	11	Joe Rokocoko
FH	10	Carlos Spencer
SH	9	Justin Marshall
N8	8	Jerry Collins
OF	7	Richie McCaw
BF	6	Reuben Thorne (c)
RL	5	Chris Jack
LL	4	Ali Williams
TP	3	Greg Somerville
HK	2	Keven Mealamu
LP	1	Dave Hewett
Replacements:
HK	16	Mark Hammett
PR	17	Kees Meeuws
LK	18	Brad Thorn
FL	19	Marty Holah
SH	20	Steve Devine
FH	21	Dan Carter
WG	22	Caleb Ralph
Coach:
John Mitchell

FB	15	Jaco van der Westhuyzen
RW	14	Ashwin Willemse
OC	13	Jorrie Muller
IC	12	De Wet Barry
LW	11	Thinus Delport
FH	10	Derick Hougaard
SH	9	Joost van der Westhuizen
N8	8	Juan Smith
OF	7	Danie Rossouw
BF	6	Corné Krige (c)
RL	5	Victor Matfield
LL	4	Bakkies Botha
TP	3	Faan Rautenbach
HK	2	John Smit
LP	1	Christo Bezuidenhout
Replacements:
HK	16	Danie Coetzee
PR	17	Richard Bands
LK	18	Selborne Boome
FL	19	Schalk Burger
SH	20	Neil de Kock
FH	21	Louis Koen
CE	22	Jaque Fourie
Coach:
Rudolf Straeuli

=== Australia vs Scotland ===
8 November 2003

Australia	33–16	Scotland
Try: Mortlock 46' c Gregan 59' c Lyons 64' c Con: Flatley (3); Pen: Flatley (4)	Report	Try: Russell 80' c Con: Paterson; Pen: Paterson (2); Drop: Paterson 38'

Lang Park, Brisbane
Attendance: 45,412
Referee: Steve Walsh (New Zealand)

FB	15	Mat Rogers
RW	14	Wendell Sailor
OC	13	Stirling Mortlock
IC	12	Elton Flatley
LW	11	Lote Tuqiri
FH	10	Stephen Larkham
SH	9	George Gregan (c)
N8	8	David Lyons
OF	7	Phil Waugh
BF	6	George Smith
RL	5	Nathan Sharpe
LL	4	Justin Harrison
TP	3	Ben Darwin
HK	2	Brendan Cannon
LP	1	Bill Young
Replacements:
HK	16	Jeremy Paul
PR	17	Al Baxter
LK	18	Dan Vickerman
FL	19	Matt Cockbain
SH	20	Chris Whitaker
CE	21	Matt Giteau
WG	22	Joe Roff
Coach:
Eddie Jones

FB	15	Glenn Metcalfe
RW	14	Simon Danielli
OC	13	Gregor Townsend
IC	12	Andrew Henderson
LW	11	Kenny Logan
FH	10	Chris Paterson
SH	9	Bryan Redpath (c)
N8	8	Simon Taylor
OF	7	Cameron Mather
BF	6	Jason White
RL	5	Stuart Grimes
LL	4	Nathan Hines
TP	3	Bruce Douglas
HK	2	Gordon Bulloch
LP	1	Tom Smith
Replacements:
HK	16	Robbie Russell
PR	17	Gordon McIlwham
LK	18	Scott Murray
N8	19	Jon Petrie
SH	20	Mike Blair
CE	21	James McLaren
CE	22	Ben Hinshelwood
Coach:
Ian McGeechan

=== France vs Ireland ===
9 November 2003

France	43–21	Ireland
Try: Magne 3' c Dominici 29' c Harinordoquy 33' c Crenca 47' c Con: Michalak (4); Pen: Michalak (5)	Report	Try: Maggs 52' c O'Driscoll (2) 65' c, 80+2' c Con: Humphreys (3)

Docklands Stadium, Melbourne
Attendance: 33,134
Referee: Jonathan Kaplan (South Africa)

FB	15	Nicolas Brusque
RW	14	Aurélien Rougerie
OC	13	Tony Marsh
IC	12	Yannick Jauzion
LW	11	Christophe Dominici
FH	10	Frédéric Michalak
SH	9	Fabien Galthié (c)
N8	8	Imanol Harinordoquy
OF	7	Olivier Magne
BF	6	Serge Betsen
RL	5	Jérôme Thion
LL	4	Fabien Pelous
TP	3	Sylvain Marconnet
HK	2	Raphaël Ibañez
LP	1	Jean-Jacques Crenca
Replacements:
HK	16	Yannick Bru
PR	17	Olivier Milloud
LK	18	Olivier Brouzet
FL	19	Patrick Tabacco
FH	20	Gérald Merceron
CE	21	Brian Liebenberg
WG	22	Pépito Elhorga
Coach:
Bernard Laporte

FB	15	Girvan Dempsey
RW	14	Shane Horgan
OC	13	Brian O'Driscoll
IC	12	Kevin Maggs
LW	11	John Kelly
FH	10	Ronan O'Gara
SH	9	Peter Stringer
N8	8	Victor Costello
OF	7	Keith Gleeson
BF	6	Simon Easterby
RL	5	Paul O'Connell
LL	4	Malcolm O'Kelly
TP	3	John Hayes
HK	2	Keith Wood (c)
LP	1	Reggie Corrigan
Replacements:
HK	16	Shane Byrne
PR	17	Marcus Horan
LK	18	Donncha O'Callaghan
N8	19	Eric Miller
SH	20	Guy Easterby
FH	21	David Humphreys
WG	22	Anthony Horgan
Coach:
Eddie O'Sullivan

=== England vs Wales ===
9 November 2003

England	28–17	Wales
Try: Greenwood 44' c Con: Wilkinson; Pen: Wilkinson (6); Drop: Wilkinson 80+1'	Report	Try: S. Jones 30' m Charvis 35' m M. Williams 71' c Con: Harris

Lang Park, Brisbane
Attendance: 45,252
Referee: Alain Rolland (Ireland)

FB	15	Jason Robinson
RW	14	Dan Luger
OC	13	Will Greenwood
IC	12	Mike Tindall
LW	11	Ben Cohen
FH	10	Jonny Wilkinson
SH	9	Matt Dawson
N8	8	Lawrence Dallaglio
OF	7	Neil Back
BF	6	Lewis Moody
RL	5	Ben Kay
LL	4	Martin Johnson (c)
TP	3	Phil Vickery
HK	2	Steve Thompson
LP	1	Jason Leonard
Replacements:
HK	16	Dorian West
PR	17	Trevor Woodman
LK	18	Simon Shaw
FL	19	Joe Worsley
SH	20	Kyran Bracken
CE	21	Mike Catt
CE	22	Stuart Abbott
Coach:
Clive Woodward

FB	15	Gareth Thomas
RW	14	Mark Jones
OC	13	Mark Taylor
IC	12	Iestyn Harris
LW	11	Shane Williams
FH	10	Stephen Jones
SH	9	Gareth Cooper
N8	8	Jonathan Thomas
OF	7	Colin Charvis (c)
BF	6	Dafydd Jones
RL	5	Robert Sidoli
LL	4	Brent Cockbain
TP	3	Adam Jones
HK	2	Robin McBryde
LP	1	Iestyn Thomas
Replacements:
HK	16	Mefin Davies
PR	17	Gethin Jenkins
LK	18	Gareth Llewellyn
FL	19	Martyn Williams
SH	20	Dwayne Peel
FH	21	Ceri Sweeney
WG	22	Kevin Morgan
Coach:
(New Zealand) Steve Hansen

== Semi-finals ==
=== New Zealand vs Australia ===
15 November 2003

New Zealand	10–22	Australia
Try: Thorne 35' c Con: MacDonald; Pen: MacDonald	Report	Try: Mortlock 9' c Con: Flatley; Pen: Flatley (5)

Stadium Australia, Sydney
Attendance: 82,444
Referee: Chris White (England)

FB	15	Mils Muliaina
RW	14	Doug Howlett
OC	13	Leon MacDonald
IC	12	Aaron Mauger
LW	11	Joe Rokocoko
FH	10	Carlos Spencer
SH	9	Justin Marshall
N8	8	Jerry Collins
OF	7	Richie McCaw
BF	6	Reuben Thorne (c)
RL	5	Ali Williams
LL	4	Chris Jack
TP	3	Greg Somerville
HK	2	Keven Mealamu
LP	1	Dave Hewett
Replacements:
HK	16	Mark Hammett
PR	17	Kees Meeuws
LK	18	Brad Thorn
FL	19	Marty Holah
SH	20	Byron Kelleher
FH	21	Dan Carter
WG	22	Caleb Ralph
Coach:
John Mitchell

FB	15	Mat Rogers
RW	14	Wendell Sailor
OC	13	Stirling Mortlock
IC	12	Elton Flatley
LW	11	Lote Tuqiri
FH	10	Stephen Larkham
SH	9	George Gregan (c)
N8	8	David Lyons
OF	7	Phil Waugh
BF	6	George Smith
RL	5	Nathan Sharpe
LL	4	Justin Harrison
TP	3	Ben Darwin
HK	2	Brendan Cannon
LP	1	Bill Young
Replacements:
HK	16	Jeremy Paul
PR	17	Al Baxter
LK	18	David Giffin
FL	19	Matt Cockbain
SH	20	Chris Whitaker
CE	21	Nathan Grey
WG	22	Joe Roff
Coach:
Eddie Jones

=== France vs England ===
16 November 2003

France	7–24	England
Try: Betsen 10' c Con: Michalak	Report	Pen: Wilkinson (5); Drop: Wilkinson (3) 9', 38', 58'

Stadium Australia, Sydney
Attendance: 82,346
Referee: Paddy O'Brien (New Zealand)

FB	15	Nicolas Brusque
RW	14	Aurélien Rougerie
OC	13	Tony Marsh
IC	12	Yannick Jauzion
LW	11	Christophe Dominici
FH	10	Frédéric Michalak
SH	9	Fabien Galthié (c)
N8	8	Imanol Harinordoquy
OF	7	Olivier Magne
BF	6	Serge Betsen
RL	5	Jérôme Thion
LL	4	Fabien Pelous
TP	3	Sylvain Marconnet
HK	2	Raphaël Ibañez
LP	1	Jean-Jacques Crenca
Replacements:
HK	16	Yannick Bru
PR	17	Olivier Milloud
LK	18	David Auradou
N8	19	Christian Labit
FH	20	Gérald Merceron
CE	21	Damien Traille
FB	22	Clément Poitrenaud
Coach:
Bernard Laporte

FB	15	Josh Lewsey
RW	14	Jason Robinson
OC	13	Will Greenwood
IC	12	Mike Catt
LW	11	Ben Cohen
FH	10	Jonny Wilkinson
SH	9	Matt Dawson
N8	8	Lawrence Dallaglio
OF	7	Neil Back
BF	6	Richard Hill
RL	5	Ben Kay
LL	4	Martin Johnson (c)
TP	3	Phil Vickery
HK	2	Steve Thompson
LP	1	Trevor Woodman
Replacements:
HK	16	Dorian West
PR	17	Jason Leonard
N8	18	Martin Corry
FL	19	Lewis Moody
SH	20	Kyran Bracken
CE	21	Mike Tindall
FB	22	Iain Balshaw
Coach:
Clive Woodward

== Third place play-off ==
20 November 2003

New Zealand	40–13	France
Try: Jack 12' c Howlett 20' c Rokocoko 51' c Thorn 54' c Muliaina 58' c Holah 72' m Con: MacDonald; Carter (4)	Report	Try: Elhorga 42' c Con: Yachvili; Pen: Yachvili; Drop: Yachvili

Stadium Australia, Sydney
Attendance: 62,712
Referee: Chris White (England)

FB	15	Mils Muliaina
RW	14	Doug Howlett
OC	13	Leon MacDonald
IC	12	Aaron Mauger
LW	11	Joe Rokocoko
FH	10	Carlos Spencer
SH	9	Steve Devine
N8	8	Jerry Collins
OF	7	Richie McCaw
BF	6	Reuben Thorne (c)
RL	5	Ali Williams
LL	4	Chris Jack
TP	3	Greg Somerville
HK	2	Keven Mealamu
LP	1	Dave Hewett
Replacements:
HK	16	Mark Hammett
PR	17	Carl Hoeft
LK	18	Brad Thorn
FL	19	Marty Holah
SH	20	Byron Kelleher
FH	21	Dan Carter
WG	22	Caleb Ralph
Coach:
John Mitchell

FB	15	Clément Poitrenaud
RW	14	Pépito Elhorga
OC	13	Tony Marsh
IC	12	Damien Traille
LW	11	David Bory
FH	10	Gérald Merceron
SH	9	Dimitri Yachvili
N8	8	Christian Labit
OF	7	Sébastien Chabal
BF	6	Patrick Tabacco
RL	5	Thibaut Privat
LL	4	David Auradou
TP	3	Jean-Baptiste Poux
HK	2	Yannick Bru (c)
LP	1	Sylvain Marconnet
Replacements:
HK	16	Raphaël Ibañez
PR	17	Jean-Jacques Crenca
LK	18	Fabien Pelous
FL	19	Olivier Magne
FH	20	Frédéric Michalak
FH	21	Brian Liebenberg
FB	22	Nicolas Brusque
Coach:
Bernard Laporte

== Final ==
22 November 2003

Australia	17–20 (a.e.t.)	England
Try: Tuqiri 6' m Pen: Flatley (4)	Report	Try: Robinson 38' m Pen: Wilkinson (4); Drop: Wilkinson 100'

Stadium Australia, Sydney
Attendance: 82,957
Referee: André Watson (South Africa)

Australia	England

FB	15	Mat Rogers
RW	14	Wendell Sailor	(substituted off) 71'
OC	13	Stirling Mortlock
IC	12	Elton Flatley
LW	11	Lote Tuqiri
FH	10	Stephen Larkham	(substituted off) temp'
SH	9	George Gregan (c)
N8	8	David Lyons	(substituted off) 57'
OF	7	Phil Waugh
BF	6	George Smith
RL	5	Nathan Sharpe	(substituted off) 48'
LL	4	Justin Harrison
TP	3	Al Baxter
HK	2	Brendan Cannon	(substituted off) 57 '
LP	1	Bill Young	(substituted off) 92'
Replacements:
HK	16	Jeremy Paul	(substituted in) 57'
PR	17	Matt Dunning	(substituted in) 92'
LK	18	David Giffin	(substituted in) 48'
FL	19	Matt Cockbain	(substituted in) 57'
SH	20	Chris Whitaker
CE	21	Matt Giteau	(substituted in) temp'
WG	22	Joe Roff	(substituted in) 71'
Coach:
Eddie Jones

FB	15	Josh Lewsey	(substituted off) 86'
RW	14	Jason Robinson
OC	12	Mike Tindall	(substituted off) 79'
IC (Note: Will Greenwood, for superstitious reasons, prefers to play wearing the number 13 shirt, even when selected to play inside centre.)	13	Will Greenwood
LW	11	Ben Cohen
FH	10	Jonny Wilkinson
SH	9	Matt Dawson
N8	8	Lawrence Dallaglio
OF	7	Neil Back
BF	6	Richard Hill	(substituted off) 93'
RL	5	Ben Kay
LL	4	Martin Johnson (c)
TP	3	Phil Vickery	(substituted off) 81'
HK	2	Steve Thompson
LP	1	Trevor Woodman
Replacements:
HK	16	Dorian West
PR	17	Jason Leonard	(substituted in) 81'
N8	18	Martin Corry
FL	19	Lewis Moody	(substituted in) 93'
SH	20	Kyran Bracken
CE	21	Mike Catt	(substituted in) 79'
FB	22	Iain Balshaw	(substituted in) 86'
Coach:
Clive Woodward

Man of the Match:
Jonny Wilkinson (England)

Touch judges:
Paddy O'Brien (New Zealand)
Paul Honiss (New Zealand)
Television match official:
Jonathan Kaplan (South Africa)
Fourth official:
Joël Jutge (France)
Fifth official:
Alain Rolland (Ireland)

Match rules

- 80 minutes
- 20 minutes of extra-time if necessary
- Penalty shootout if still tied.
- Seven named eligible substitutes
