= 2002 Italy rugby union tour of New Zealand =

Series of rugby matches

Summary
P	W	D	L
Total
2	1	0	1
Test match
1	0	0	1
Opponent
P	W	D	L
New Zealand
1	0	0	1

The 2002 Italy rugby union tour of New Zealand was a series of matches played in May and June 2002 in New Zealand by Italy national rugby union team.

== Matches ==
28 May 2002

Manawatu	15–37	Italy XV

Arena Manawatu. Palmerstorn North

2 June 2002

(New Zealand) Divisional XV	35–35	Italy XV

Arena Manawatu, Palmerstorn North

8 June 2002

New Zealand	64–10	Italy
Try: Cullen, Hewett; Kelleher, Lomu; McDonnell, Meeuws; Ralph 3		Try: Bortolami; Con: Peens; Pen: Peens

Waikato Stadium, Hamilton
Referee: Nigel Williams (Wales)

New Zealand: 15. Christian Cullen, 14. Doug Howlett, 13. Mark Robinson, 12. Daryl Gibson, 11. Caleb Ralph, 10. Andrew Mehrtens, 9. Byron Kelleher, 8. Taine Randell, 7. Marty Holah, 6. Reuben Thorne (capt.), 5. Norm Maxwell, 4. Simon Maling, 3. Kees Meeuws, 2. Tom Willis, 1. Joe McDonnell, – replacements: 16. Dave Hewett, 17. Jonah Lomu, 18. Mark Hammett, 19. Aaron Mauger – Unused: 20. Chris Jack, 21. Richie McCaw, 22. Justin Marshall
Italy: 15. Gert Peens, 14. Nicola Mazzucato, 13. Nanni Raineri, 12. Cristian Zanoletti, 11. Denis Dallan, 10. Francesco Mazzariol, 9. Matteo Mazzantini, 8. Sergio Parisse, 7. Aaron Persico, 6. Andrea de Rossi, 5. Mark Giacheri, 4. Marco Bortolami (capt.), 3. Ramiro Martinez-Frugoni, 2. Andrea Moretti, 1. Gianluca Faliva, – Replacements: 16. Mauro Bergamasco, 17. Juan Manuel Queirolo, 18. Martin Castrogiovanni, 19. Walter Pozzebon, 20. Santiago Dellapè, 21. Matteo Barbini, 22. Stefano Saviozzi
