= 2003 England rugby union tour of the Southern Hemisphere =

- Coach: Clive Woodward
- Tour captain: Martin Johnson
Summary
P	W	D	L
Total
3	3	0	0
Test match
2	2	0	0
Opponent
P	W	D	L
New Zealand
1	1	0	0
Australia
1	1	0	0

Tour chronology
- ← Argentina 2002 Australasia 2004 →

== Matches ==
Scores and results list England's points tally first.

Opponent	For	Against	Date	Venue	Status	Report
New Zealand Māori	23	9	9 June 2003	Yarrow Stadium, New Plymouth	Tour match	BBC report
New Zealand	15	13	14 June 2003	Wellington Regional Stadium, Wellington	Test match	BBC report
Australia	25	14	21 June 2003	Docklands Stadium, Melbourne	Test match	BBC report

=== New Zealand ===
In the first half both teams scored two penalties to leave the half time score at 6–6. In the second half England scored two more penalties to go 12–6 up. England then had two men, Lawrence Dallaglio and Neil Back, sin binned. Despite this Wilkinson extended England's lead with a drop goal. New Zealand scored a try to close the gap, but England won 15–13.

14 June 2003

New Zealand	13–15	England
Try: Howlett; Con: Spencer; Pen: Spencer (2)		Pen: Wilkinson (4); Drop: Wilkinson

Wellington Regional Stadium, Wellington
Attendance: 37,000
Referee: Stuart Dickinson (Australia)

New Zealand: 15. Doug Howlett, 14. Joe Rokocoko, 13. Ma'a Nonu, 12. Tana Umaga, 11. Caleb Ralph, 10. Carlos Spencer, 9. Justin Marshall, 8. Rodney So'oialo, 7. Richie McCaw, 6. Reuben Thorne (c), 5. Ali Williams, 4. Chris Jack, 3. Greg Somerville, 2. Anton Oliver, 1. Dave Hewett – Replacements: 16. Keven Mealamu, 19. Jerry Collins, 22. Mils Muliaina – Unused: 17. Carl Hoeft, 18. Brad Thorn, 19. Jerry Collins, 21. Dan Carter
England: 15. Josh Lewsey, 14. Jason Robinson, 13. Will Greenwood, 12. Mike Tindall, 11. Ben Cohen, 10. Jonny Wilkinson, 9. Kyran Bracken, 8. Lawrence Dallaglio (yellow card) , 7. Neil Back (yellow card) , 6. Richard Hill, 5. Ben Kay, 4. Martin Johnson (c), 3. Jason Leonard, 2. Steve Thompson, 1. Graham Rowntree – Replacements: 17. Phil Vickery, 19. Joe Worsley, 22. Dan Luger – Unused: 16. Dorian West, 18. Steve Borthwick, 20. Andy Gomarsall, 21. Paul Grayson

=== Australia ===
21 June 2003

Australia	14–25	England
Try: Sailor; Pen: Roff (3)		Try: Cohen, Greenwood, Tindall; Con: Wilkinson (2); Pen: Wilkinson (2)

Docklands Stadium, Melbourne
Attendance: 55,000
Referee: David McHugh (Ireland)

Australia: 15. Chris Latham, 14. Wendell Sailor, 13. Morgan Turinui, 12. Steve Kefu, 11. Joe Roff, 10. Nathan Grey, 9. George Gregan (c), 1. Bill Young, 2. Jeremy Paul, 3. Patricio Noriega, 4. David Giffin, 5. Nathan Sharpe, 6. David Lyons, 7. Phil Waugh, 8. Toutai Kefu – Replacements: 16. Brendan Cannon, 17. Ben Darwin, 18. Dan Vickerman, 21. Mat Rogers, 22. Lote Tuqiri – Unused: 19. Daniel Heenan, 20. Chris Whitaker
England: 15. Josh Lewsey, 14. Jason Robinson, 13. Will Greenwood, 12. Mike Tindall, 11. Ben Cohen, 10. Jonny Wilkinson, 9. Kyran Bracken, 8. Lawrence Dallaglio, 7. Neil Back, 6. Richard Hill, 5. Ben Kay, 4. Martin Johnson (c), 3. Phil Vickery, 2. Steve Thompson, 1. Trevor Woodman – Replacements: 18. Steve Borthwick, 19. Joe Worsley, 20. Matt Dawson – Unused: 16. Mark Regan, 17. Jason Leonard, 21. Alex King, 22. Dan Luger

== Touring party ==
England named their squad for the tour on 28 May 2003. Full-back Iain Balshaw was included after four months out with a shoulder injury, while centre Jamie Noon was called up after scoring two tries in the match against the Barbarians on 25 May. Lock Danny Grewcock was left out after being suspended for the team's first game against New Zealand, having punched England team-mate Lawrence Dallaglio in the final of the 2002–03 European Challenge Cup; Grewcock was replaced by Tom Palmer, who had initially been named in the England A squad for the 2003 Churchill Cup. Flanker Andy Hazell received his first call-up for an England senior tour.

- Head coach: Clive Woodward
- Assistant coaches: Andy Robinson, Phil Larder, Dave Alred
- Captain: Martin Johnson

=== Full-backs ===
Josh Lewsey, Iain Balshaw

=== Three-quarters ===
Jason Robinson, Dan Luger, James Simpson-Daniel, Ben Cohen, Will Greenwood, Mike Tindall, Stuart Abbott, Ben Johnston, Jamie Noon

=== Half-backs ===
Jonny Wilkinson, Paul Grayson, Alex King, Matt Dawson, Kyran Bracken, Andy Gomarsall

=== Forwards ===
Steve Thompson, Mark Regan, Dorian West, Jason Leonard, Mike Worsley, Trevor Woodman, Graham Rowntree, Phil Vickery, Martin Johnson, Ben Kay, Tom Palmer, Steve Borthwick, Simon Shaw, Richard Hill, Joe Worsley, Neil Back, Andy Hazell, Paul Volley, Martin Corry, Lawrence Dallaglio
