= 2002 New Zealand rugby union tour of Europe =

Summary
P	W	D	L
Total
3	1	1	1
Test match
3	1	1	1
Opponent
P	W	D	L
England
1	0	0	1
France
1	0	1	0
Wales
1	1	0	0

The 2002 New Zealand rugby union tour of Europe was a series of matches played in November 2002 in England, France and Wales by the New Zealand national rugby union team.

== Results ==
9 November 2002

England	31–28	New Zealand
Try: Cohen, Moody, Wilkinson; Con: Wilkinson 2 Pen: Wilkinson 3 Drop: Wilkinson		Try: Howlett, Lee, Lomu 2 Con: Blair 2, Mehrtens 2

Twickenham Stadium, London
Attendance: 75,000
Referee: Jonathan Kaplan (South Africa)

England: 15. Jason Robinson, 14. James Simpson-Daniel, 13. Will Greenwood, 12. Mike Tindall, 11. Ben Cohen, 10. Jonny Wilkinson, 9. Matt Dawson, 8. Lawrence Dallaglio, 7. Richard Hill, 6. Lewis Moody, 5. Danny Grewcock, 4. Martin Johnson (c), 3. Phil Vickery, 2. Steve Thompson, 1. Trevor Woodman – Replacements: 16. Mark Regan, 17. Jason Leonard, 18. Ben Kay, 19. Neil Back, 20. Austin Healey, 21. Ben Johnston, 22. Tim Stimpson
New Zealand: 15. Ben Blair, 14. Doug Howlett, 13. Tana Umaga, 12. Keith Lowen, 11. Jonah Lomu, 10. Carlos Spencer, 9. Steve Devine, 8. Sam Broomhall, 7. Marty Holah, 6. Taine Randell (c), 5. Keith Robinson, 4. Ali Williams, 3. Kees Meeuws, 2. Andrew Hore, 1. Joe McDonnell – Replacements: 16. Keven Mealamu, 17. Carl Hayman, 18. Brad Mika, 19. Rodney So'oialo, 20. Danny Lee, 21. Andrew Mehrtens, 22. Mark Robinson

16 November 2002

France	20–20	New Zealand
Try: Brusque, Magne; Con: Gelez 2 Pen: Gelez 2		Try: Meeuws, Umaga; Con: Mehrtens 2 Pen: Mehrtens 2

Stade de France, Paris
Referee: Scott Young (Australia)

France: Nicolas Brusque, Vincent Clerc, Thomas Castaignède, Damien Traille, Cédric Heymans, François Gelez, Fabien Galthié (c), Imanol Harinordoquy, Olivier Magne, Serge Betsen, Olivier Brouzet, Fabien Pelous, Pieter de Villiers, Raphaël Ibañez, Jean-Jacques Crenca – Replacements: Sébastien Chabal – Unused: 16. Sylvain Marconnet, 17. Jean-Baptiste Rué, 19. Thibault Privat, 20. Gérald Merceron, 21. Xavier Garbajosa, 22. Dimitri Yachvili
New Zealand: 15. Christian Cullen, 14. Doug Howlett, 13. Tana Umaga, 12. Mark Robinson, 11. Jonah Lomu, 10. Andrew Mehrtens, 9. Danny Lee, 8. Sam Broomhall, 7. Marty Holah, 6. Taine Randell (c), 5. Brad Mika, 4. Ali Williams, 3. Kees Meeuws (yellow card) , 2. Andrew Hore, 1. Joe McDonnell – Replacements: 17. Carl Hayman, 18. Keith Robinson – Unused: 16. Keven Mealamu, 19. Rodney So'oialo, 20. Steve Devine, 21. Paul Steinmetz, 22. Ben Blair

23 November 2002

Wales	17–43	New Zealand
Try: Robinson, penalty try Con: Harris, S: Jones; Pen: S.Jones		Try: Howlett 2, King, Meeuws; Con: Mehrtens 4 Pen: Mehrtens 5

Millennium Stadium, Cardiff
Attendance: 69,000
Referee: Tappe Henning (South Africa)

Wales: 15. Rhys Williams, 14. Mark Jones, 13. Jamie Robinson, 12. Sonny Parker, 11. Gareth Thomas, 10. Stephen Jones, 9. Dwayne Peel, 8. Colin Charvis (c), 7. Martyn Williams, 6. Dafydd Jones, 5. Gareth Llewellyn, 4. Robert Sidoli, 3. Ben Evans, 2. Robin McBryde, 1. Iestyn Thomas – Replacements: Gethin Jenkins, Michael Owen, Iestyn Harris, Richard Parks, Ryan Powell – Unused: 16. Mefin Davies, 19. Richard Parks, 20. Ryan Powell
New Zealand: 15. Ben Blair, 14. Doug Howlett, 13. Regan King, 12. Tana Umaga, 11. Jonah Lomu, 10. Andrew Mehrtens, 9. Steve Devine, 8. Rodney So'oialo, 7. Dan Braid, 6. Taine Randell (c), 5. Ali Williams, 4. Keith Robinson, 3. Carl Hayman, 2. Keven Mealamu, 1. Tony Woodcock – Replacements: 17. Kees Meeuws, 18. Brad Mika, 19. Marty Holah, 19. Marty Holah, 21. Paul Steinmetz, 22. Mark Robinson – Unused: 16. Andrew Hore, 20. Danny Lee
