= List of Rugby World Cup red cards =

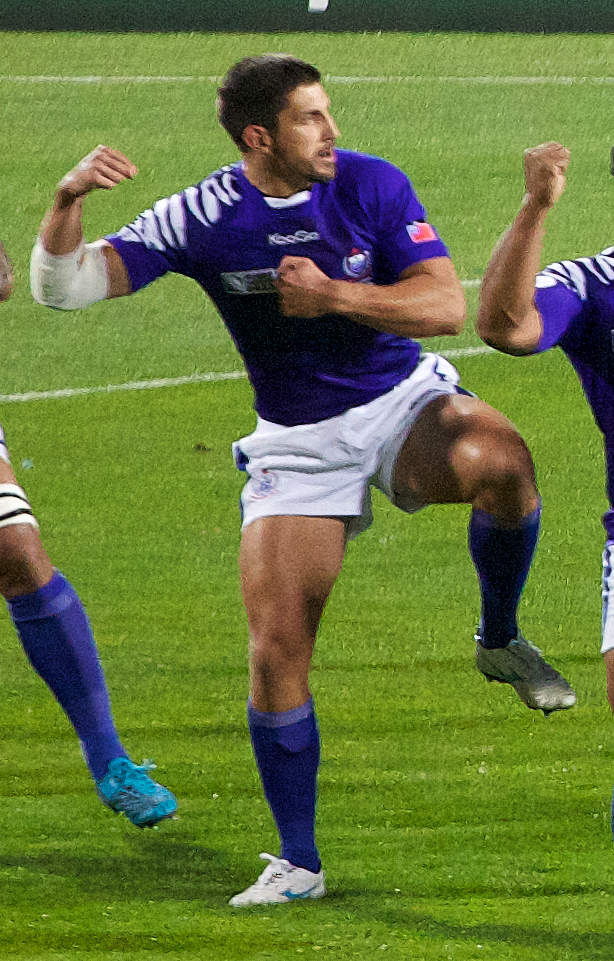
Paul Williams was the first of two players to be sent off at the 2011 Rugby World Cup.

A total of 33 red cards have been issued during Rugby World Cup tournaments since the first in 1987. Discipline at the 2003 event could be said to be the best out of all seven tournaments to date, at least in terms of red cards, as none were issued. Nine countries have seen at least one of their players dismissed, with Tonga and Canada both having lost three members of their team. The position with the most red cards is flanker, with eight such players leaving the field. Four team captains have been dismissed by the referee. There has only been one red card to date for two yellow card offenses, and only one red card in a World Cup final (in 2023).

== Details ==
The first player to receive a red card was Welsh lock Huw Richards in the inaugural Rugby World Cup. Richards punched New Zealand lock Gary Whetton and received a one-week suspension for his actions. He therefore missed the final match of the team's World Cup – the third place playoff against Australia. In that match Australian flanker David Codey was sent off in the fifth minute, which at the time was the quickest dismissal in any Rugby World Cup match Warned after only one minute, Codey again trampled on a Welsh player in a ruck and was told to leave the field. The game continued and Australia lost by a point.

The 1991 Rugby World Cup saw two locks from opposing teams shown the red card. Highly regarded Argentine Pedro Sporleder, who would go on to compete in the next three tournaments, fought with Samoan Mat Keenan and both were sent from the field.

Four players were sent off during the 1995 Rugby World Cup with three of them being dismissed in one incident. Electrical problems at the Boet Erasmus Stadium in Port Elizabeth caused the South Africa–Canada match to be postponed by 45 minutes, adding to the tension of the last, decisive Pool A game. With 10 minutes left the South Africans were leading 20–0 when a challenge by Pieter Hendriks on Canadian Winston Stanley sparked a fight between the two teams. Fullback Scott Stewart charged into Hendriks and was joined by Springbok hooker James Dalton and several others. Referee David McHugh chose to send off Dalton as well as Canadians Rod Snow and Gareth Rees, the captain. Investigations after the match led to Hendriks and Stewart being suspended. One week earlier Tongan flanker Feleti Mahoni was caught stamping on the head of Frenchman Philippe Benetton during a ruck, resulting in an immediate dismissal and a lengthy ban. Until that point Tonga had been making impressive progress against a French team that had been tipped to win the tournament.

The 1999 Rugby World Cup also saw four players dismissed but this time in four matches and from four teams. The first red card went to Marika Vunibaka who had scored a try and in doing so became the only player to have been sent off after scoring points. Dismissed in injury time at the end of the second half, the Fijian was adjudged to have head-butted a Canadian player. Canadian flanker Dan Baugh was sent off for stamping on a Namibian player and subsequently received a four-week ban. Ngalu Taufo'ou was sanctioned in the same way after running ten metres to punch England flanker Richard Hill. On the same day Brendan Venter was sent off for stamping on Uruguayan Martín Panizza.

Unique amongst the seven tournaments, no players were sent off during the 48 games of the 2003 Rugby World Cup.

Two players were shown red cards for two teams at the 2007 Rugby World Cup, both on the same day. Tongan Hale T-Pole was dismissed in the final ten minutes of the match against Samoa when he elbowed substitute Leo Lafaiali'i in the face. He had received several warnings from the referee prior to the incident. Namibian Jacques Nieuwenhuis received his red card after a dangerous tackle on Frenchman Sébastien Chabal. The resultant enquiry decided that Nieuwenhuis had recklessly but not intentionally tackled Chabal around the head and gave him a one match ban.

Two players were sent off during the 2011 Rugby World Cup. Samoa's Paul Williams was reprimanded for striking a South African player but escaped a ban when it was deemed that his actions were not heavy, had no adverse effect on the game, and that there were "compelling on-field and/or off-field aggravating features". Wales captain Sam Warburton was sent off in the semi-final against France because he did not safely return a player to the floor after a tackle. The decision was controversial with several commentators believing that it should only be a yellow card because Warburton did not drive the player into the ground. Austin Healey was one of several current and former players who criticised the dismissal on Twitter, calling it a "most ridiculous decision". However, the red card was upheld after the match and Warburton was given a three-week ban. Warburton became only the second player to be dismissed in a semi-final. Coincidentally, the other player, Huw Richards, was also representing Wales.

== Red cards ==
Rugby World Cup red cards
No.	Player	Position	For	Against	Result	Time	Date	Ref.
1	Huw Richards	Lock	Wales	New Zealand	6–49	77'	14 June 1987	
2	David Codey	Flanker	Australia	Wales	21–22	5'	18 June 1987	
3	Pedro Sporleder	Lock	Argentina	Samoa	12–35	65'	13 October 1991	
4	Mat Keenan	Lock	Samoa	Argentina	35–12	65'	13 October 1991	
5	Feleti Mahoni	Flanker	Tonga	France	10–38	68'	26 May 1995	
6	Gareth Rees	Fly-half (captain)	Canada	South Africa	0–20	70'	3 June 1995	
7	Rod Snow	Prop	Canada	South Africa	0–20	70'	3 June 1995	
8	James Dalton	Hooker	South Africa	Canada	20–0	70'	3 June 1995	
9	Marika Vunibaka	Wing	Fiji	Canada	38–22	80'+	9 October 1999	
10	Dan Baugh	Flanker	Canada	Namibia	72–11	48'	14 October 1999	
11	Ngalu Taufo'ou	Prop	Tonga	England	10–101	35'	15 October 1999	
12	Brendan Venter	Centre	South Africa	Uruguay	39–3	40'	15 October 1999	
13	Hale T-Pole	Flanker	Tonga	Samoa	19–15	71'	16 September 2007	
14	Jacques Nieuwenhuis	Number 8	Namibia	France	10–87	19'	16 September 2007	
15	Paul Williams	Full-back	Samoa	South Africa	5–13	70'	30 September 2011	
16	Sam Warburton	Flanker (captain)	Wales	France	8–9	17'	15 October 2011	
17	Agustín Ormaechea	Scrum-half	Uruguay	Fiji	15–47	66'	6 October 2015	
18	John Quill	Flanker	United States	England	7–45	70'	26 September 2019	
19	Facundo Gattas	Prop	Uruguay	Georgia	7–33	78'	29 September 2019	
20	Ed Fidow	Wing	Samoa	Scotland	0–34	75'	30 September 2019	
21	Andrea Lovotti	Prop	Italy	South Africa	3–49	43'	4 October 2019	
22	Tomas Lavanini	Lock	Argentina	England	10–39	17'	5 October 2019	
23	Josh Larsen	Lock	Canada	South Africa	7–66	36'	8 October 2019	
24	Bundee Aki	Centre	Ireland	Samoa	47–5	29'	12 October 2019	
25	Sebastien Vahaamahina	Lock	France	Wales	19–20	50'	20 October 2019	
26	Tom Curry	Flanker	England	Argentina	27–10	3'	9 September 2023	
27	Ethan de Groot	Prop	New Zealand	Namibia	71–3	72'	15 September 2023	
28	Vincent Pinto	Wing	Portugal	Wales	8–28	77'	16 September 2023	
29	Johan Deysel	Centre (captain)	Namibia	France	0–96	45'	21 September 2023	
30	Vaea Fifita	Flanker	Tonga	Scotland	17–45	77'	24 September 2023	
31	Desiderius Sethie	Prop	Namibia	Uruguay	26–36	63'	27 September 2023	
32	Ben Lam	Wing	Samoa	Japan	22–28	47'	28 September 2023	
33	Sam Cane	Flanker (captain)	New Zealand	South Africa	11–12	27'	28 October 2023	

== Teams ==
Key

Did not participate

Team	1987	1991	1995	1999	2003	2007	2011	2015	2019	2023	Total
Argentina		1							1		2
Australia	1										1
Canada			2	1					1	–	4
England										1	1
Fiji			–	1							1
France									1		1
Georgia	–	–	–	–							0
Ireland									1		1
Italy									1		1
Ivory Coast	–	–		–	–	–	–	–	–	–	0
Japan											0
Namibia	–	–	–			1				2	3
New Zealand										2	2
Portugal	–	–	–	–	–		–	–	–	1	1
Romania									–		0
Russia	–	–	–	–	–	–		–		–	0
Samoa	–	1					1		1	1	4
Scotland											0
South Africa	–	–	1	1							2
Spain	–	–	–		–	–	–	–	–	–	0
Tonga		–	1	1		1				1	4
United States			–						1	–	1
Uruguay	–	–	–			–	–	1	1		2
Wales	1						1				2
Zimbabwe			–	–	–	–	–	–	–	–	0
Total	2	2	4	4	0	2	2	1	8	8	33

== See also ==
- Glossary of rugby union terms
