= David McHugh =

Irish rugby union referee (born 1955)

- Born: David Thomas Michael McHugh; 21 December 1955 (age 70) Limerick, Ireland
- School: St Munchin's College

Rugby union career
- Position: Scrum-half
Senior career
Years	Team	Apps	(Points)
- Aer Lingus
- Highfield
- Ballincollig
Refereeing career
Years	Competition		Apps
1994–2004	Test Matches		29
1994	→ Rugby World Cup qualifier		
1995–2004	→ Six Nations Championship		
1996–2002	→ Tri Nations		
1995–2003	→ Rugby World Cup		6
1995–2004	Heineken Cup		
- → 1996 final
- → 2001 final
2002–2004	Celtic League		

David McHugh is an Irish former rugby union referee. McHugh refereed matches at the 1995, 1999 and 2003 Rugby World Cups. In 1996 McHugh refereed the inaugural Heineken Cup final. He would also referee the 2001 final, making him the first referee to take charge of two European Rugby Champions Cup finals. He also refereed in the Celtic League, the Six Nations Championship and the Tri Nations. In 2002, while refereeing a Tri Nations match between South Africa and New Zealand, McHugh was assaulted by a South African fan. After retiring as a referee in 2004, McHugh worked as a referee performance officer and then manager for the Irish Rugby Football Union.

== Early life ==
McHugh was educated at St Munchin's College and played as a scrum-half for Aer Lingus, Highfield and Ballincollig. Although originally from Limerick, McHugh later settled in Blackrock, Cork. Before becoming a full-time professional referee, McHugh was a fruit importer.

== Refereeing career ==
=== Early years ===
McHugh began refereeing in the 1980s. He later recalled taking charge of a schoolboy international between a Wales team featuring Scott Quinnell and an England team captained by Kyran Bracken. McHugh made his senior international debut as a referee on 17 September 1994 when he took charge of a 1995 Rugby World Cup qualifier between Romania and Wales at Dinamo Stadium.

=== Six Nations Championship ===
On 18 February 1995 McHugh made his Five Nations Championship debut when he took charge of a match between France and Scotland at the Parc des Princes. On 21 February 2004 he refereed his final Six Nations Championship game when he took charge of the match between England and Scotland at Murrayfield.

=== Heineken Cup ===
In 1996 McHugh refereed the inaugural Heineken Cup final between Stade Toulousain and Cardiff. He also refereed the 2001 final between Leicester Tigers and Stade Français, making him the first referee to take charge of two European Rugby Champions Cup finals.

=== Rugby World Cup ===
McHugh refereed matches at the 1995, 1999 and 2003 Rugby World Cups. He made his Rugby World Cup debut on 3 June 1995 taking charge of a match between Canada and South Africa. McHugh issued three red cards, sending off Canada's Rod Snow and Gareth Rees and South Africa's James Dalton following a brawl. McHugh went onto referee six Rugby World Cup matches over three tournaments.

=== Tri Nations assault ===
On 10 August 2002 McHugh was refereeing a Tri Nations match between South Africa and New Zealand at the ABSA Stadium. McHugh had awarded New Zealand a penalty try, after a high tackle on Tana Umaga, and denied South Africa's Breyton Paulse a try after an interference call against James Dalton. These incidents allegedly incited Pieter Van Zyl, a South African supporter, to invade the pitch and tackle and assault McHugh. Van Zyl evaded over four hundred security officials to launch the assault as New Zealand's Justin Marshall was preparing to put the ball into a scrum. New Zealand's Richie McCaw punched Van Zyl and, together with South Africa's AJ Venter, wrestled the assailant off McHugh. Van Zyl was then escorted off the pitch by two security officials. The assault left McHugh with a dislocated shoulder and he had to be replaced as the match referee by Chris White. Van Zyl was subsequently found guilty of assaulting McHugh and fined R10,000 (€1,012). He also received a lifelong ban, preventing him from attending matches organised by the South African Rugby Union.

=== IRFU ===
After retiring as a referee, McHugh continued to be employed by the IRFU in various roles. He served as specialist advisor on the 2005 British & Irish Lions tour to New Zealand. He also acted as a television match official and as an assessor. However his main role was to work as a referee development officer. McHugh would help recruit and mentor both John Lacey and Joy Neville. In August 2015 McHugh became the IRFU referee performance manager. This involved coaching and managing the IRFU's elite panel of referees who took charge of matches in the Pro14, the European Rugby Champions Cup and the European Rugby Challenge Cup as well as test matches. On 5 October 2017 his contract with the IRFU was terminated, following an independent review of the referee department. McHugh subsequently took legal action, involving the High Court, against the IRFU, claiming unfair dismissal. However, on 7 November 2017 it was announced that the McHugh and the IRFU had reached a settlement.
