= Neil de Kock =

South African rugby union player

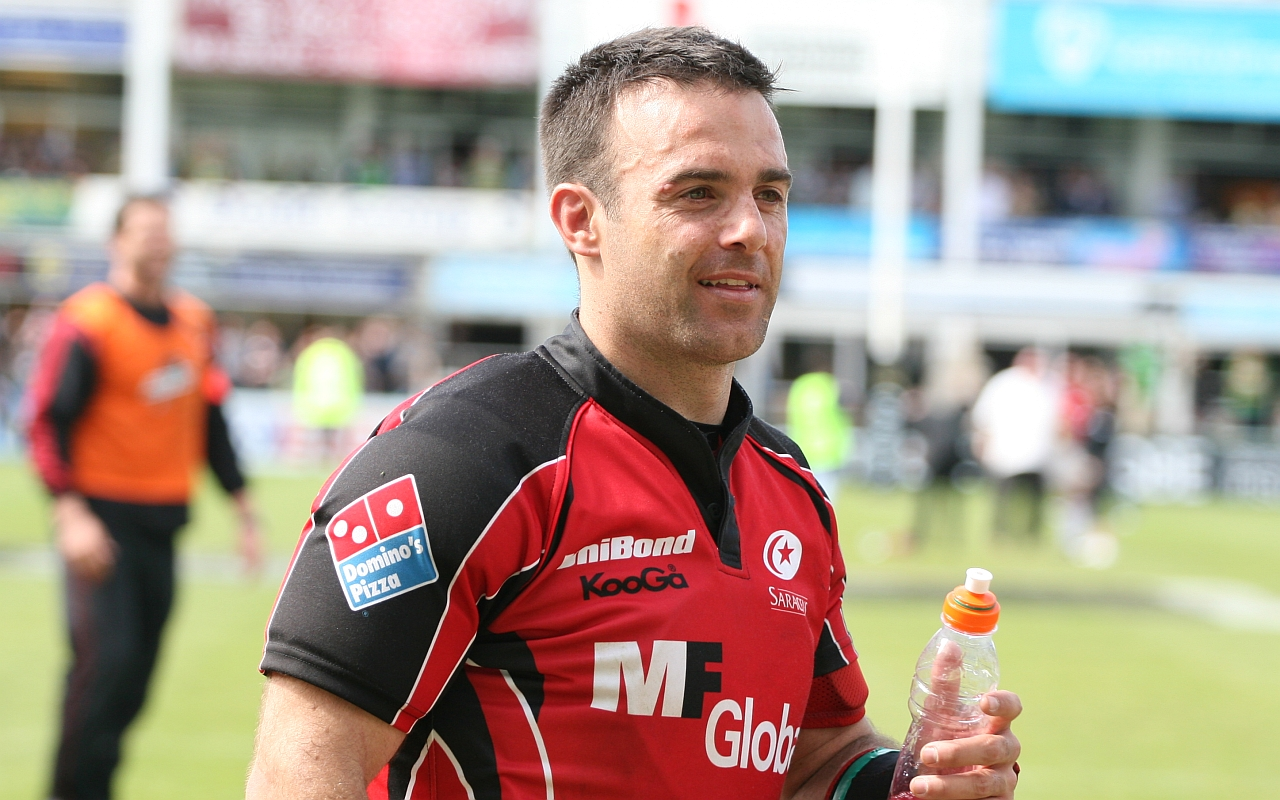
- De Kock in 2010
- Born: Neil de Kock; 20 November 1978 (age 47) Cape Town, Western Cape, South Africa
- Height: 1.75 m (5 ft 9 in)
- Weight: 81 kg (12 st 11 lb)
- School: The Settlers High School, Bellville; Boston Primary, Bellville
- University: Stellenbosch University

Rugby union career
- Position: Scrum half
Senior career
Years	Team	Apps	(Points)
2006–2017	Saracens	250	(70)
1999–2000	Griffons	17	(0)
- Correct as of 15 February 2015
Provincial / State sides
Years	Team	Apps	(Points)
2000–2006	Western Province	52	
- Correct as of 7 November 2007
Super Rugby
Years	Team	Apps	(Points)
2001–2006	Stormers	49	
- Correct as of 15 May 2011
International career
Years	Team	Apps	(Points)
2001–2003	South Africa	10	(10)

Neil (Niles) de Kock (born 20 November 1978) is a retired rugby union footballer who last played at scrum half for Saracens. He has claimed ten caps for South Africa. Before moving to the Guinness Premiership in 2006 he had gained a reputation for hard work and personal integrity from his days in South African rugby, representing Western Province and the Super Rugby franchise the Stormers, having started his professional career at the Griffons.

== Early life ==
Born 20 November 1978 in Cape Town, De Kock was educated at Boston Primary, Bellville and The Settlers High School, Bellville before attending Stellenbosch University. Initially failing to secure a contract with his native Western Province side, he made the journey to the Griffons in Free State Province in search of Currie Cup rugby to start his professional career.

== Playing career ==
=== Griffons 1999–2000 ===
De Kock spent a season playing in Free State Province playing for the Griffons in a team that was to ultimately to produce four Springboks in Lukas Van Biljon, Gavin Passens and Dean Hall as well as De Kock. His performances offered him the chance to return to his home union to represent Western Province.

=== Western Province/Stormers 2000–06 ===
De Kock was to spend 6 seasons with Western Province making 52 appearances in a team that won the Currie Cup in his first two seasons with the side. In 2001, his second season with Western Province he made the step up to Super Rugby (then Super 12) level rugby with the associated Stormers franchise, going on to make 49 appearances.

Also in the 2001 season, De Kock won his first full international honours with the Springboks against Italy. At international level a frustrating period followed, first in a sequence games sitting unused on the bench, followed by a knee injury offering further chances for his rival at Super 12 and national level, Bolla Conradie. He forced his way back into contention, appearing in the 2002 Tri Nations series, starting two games, appearing from the bench in a third and scoring his maiden test try.

The following season saw De Kock continuing to battle for his shirt at Western Province, Stormers and national level, making only one start and a single bench appearance for the Springboks. He was though selected for the Rugby World Cup 2003 South Africa squad, making one starting line up and appearing from the bench three times, as well as scoring his second international try.

Succeeding seasons brought further regular appearances for De Kock for Western Province and the Stormers, but opportunities to fight his way back into the Springbok side were limited and in 2006 he made the move to the northern hemisphere, signing for Saracens in time for the 2006–07 Guinness Premiership season.

=== Saracens 2006–2017 ===
De Kock made his debut for Saracens against London Irish on 30 September 2006. In his debut season at Saracens, De Kock saw off strong competition from the likes of Fijian Mosese Rauluni and the Englishman Alan Dickens to establish himself as first choice scrum-half, making 25 appearances for the club. He quickly formed an effective partnership with New Zealander Glen Jackson at fly-half, yielding performances that put him contention for the club's player of the season.

For the 2007–08 season, De Kock's leadership role at Saracens was rewarded as he was named as the playing captain for the season, alongside club captain and England stalwart, Richard Hill. He started as Saracens won their first Premiership title in 2011. He was a replacement as they won further titles in 2015 and 2016. He retired in 2017.
