= Marco Wentzel =

South African rugby union player

- Full name: Marco Van Zyl Wentzel
- Born: 6 May 1979 (age 47) George, South Africa
- Height: 2.01 m (6 ft 7 in)
- Weight: 117 kg (18 st 6 lb; 258 lb)

Rugby union career
- Position: Lock
Youth career
- 1996–1997: SWD Eagles
Senior career
Years	Team	Apps	(Points)
1998–1999	SWD Eagles	4	(0)
2000–2002	Pumas	29	(15)
2001–2002	Bulls	16	(0)
2003	Cats	10	(0)
2003–2005	Free State Cheetahs	26	(20)
2005–2006	Treviso	64	(0)
2006	Boland Cavaliers	7	(5)
2006–2007	Treviso	24	(25)
2007–2009	Leicester Tigers	48	(0)
2009–2011	Leeds Carnegie	49	(20)
2011–2013	London Wasps	51	(10)
2013–2015	Sharks (Currie Cup)	28	(5)
2015	Sharks	16	(0)
- Correct as of 12 October 2015
International career
Years	Team	Apps	(Points)
2002	South Africa	2	(0)
2009	Southern Kings	1	(0)
- Correct as of 8 May 2015

Marco Van Zyl Wentzel (born 6 May 1979 in George, Western Cape, South Africa) is a rugby union player. He plays as a lock or in the back-row.

He attended Outeniqua High School in George and played for their first team from 1995 to 1997; he was also captain in 1997. In 1996 and 1997, he played Craven Week for South Western Districts. In 1997, he also played for SWD U21. After finishing school, he signed a contract with the SWD Eagles, where Heyneke Meyer was the coach. He made his Currie Cup debut that year for SWD against North-West province. In 2000, he signed for the Pumas on a three-year deal. In 2001 and 2002, he also played for the Bulls in Super 12.

In 2001, he played for a South Africa Under-23 side which won the Africa Cup and in 2002 he became a Springbok. He made his debut against France alongside Bakkies Botha and Jean de Villiers. He joined the Free State Cheetahs and played for them from 2003 until 2005; he also played Super Rugby with the Cats in 2003.

In 2004, he signed with the Italian outfit Treviso where he played for 3 years, coming back in between for stints with the Free State Cheetahs in 2005 (winning the Currie Cup with them) and the Boland Cavaliers, which won Currie Cup First Division.

While at Treviso, they won the Copa Italia in 2004 and the Italian Super 10 in 2005 and 2006. He moved to England to represent Leicester Tigers and Leeds Carnegie in the Aviva Premiership, before plying his trade with London Wasps and joining teammate Steve Thompson at the Wycombe-based club in 2011.

Leaving Wasps after the 2012–13 Premiership season, he returned to South Africa and signed a two-year contract to play for the Sharks domestically and for the Sharks in Super Rugby.

He was released by the Sharks in November 2015.
