= Werner Greeff =

South Africa international rugby union player

- Born: Werner Greeff; 14 July 1977 (age 49) Bellville, South Africa
- Height: 1.88 m (6 ft 2 in)
- Weight: 92 kg (14 st 7 lb)
- School: Hoërskool D.F. Malan
- Occupation: Businessman

Rugby union career
- Position: Fullback or centre
Provincial / State sides
Years	Team	Apps	(Points)
1999–2006	Western Province	62	(52)
- Correct as of 2 January 2008
Super Rugby
Years	Team	Apps	(Points)
2000–2006	Stormers	43	(43)
- Correct as of 2 January 2008
International career
Years	Team	Apps	(Points)
2002–2003	Springboks	12	(31)
- Correct as of 2 January 2008

Werner Greeff (born 14 July 1977 in Bellville, Western Cape) is a former South African rugby union player. He played for Western Province in the Currie Cup and for the Stormers in the Super 14 until a neck injury forced him into retirement in January 2007. Greeff also played 12 Tests for South Africa.

Greeff was a talented utility back, but his career was blighted by a succession of injuries: a broken hand, damaged shoulder, injured knee, and, finally, a career-ending neck injury. He made his international debut in June 2002, when he came on as a substitute against Argentina, and went on to win a further 11 caps, all but one as a starter. The only time he did not start as a fullback was in his last international appearance, against Georgia in the 2003 Rugby World Cup, when he played centre.

Although Werner Greeff scored only four tries for his country, one of them, against Australia in a Tri Nations match at Ellis Park, Johannesburg, on 17 August 2002, was voted the South African try of that year. The Springboks, who had gone behind 0–9 after conceding three kickable penalties in the first 20 minutes, scored four tries to take a 26–9 lead with 20 minutes remaining. Australia responded with three tries and a drop-goal and led 26–31 as time expired on the clock. The Springboks played the last ten minutes with only 14 men after Marius Joubert had been shown a red card. Just before full-time they launched a last, desperate counter-attack which concluded with Werner Greeff hitting the Australian defence at full speed on a perfect angle and powering his way over the line for a try that levelled the scores; with the last kick of the match, he then converted his own try to give South Africa a dramatic win.

In March 2006, Greeff underwent neck surgery that involved the fusion of two vertebrae. After spending six months in rehabilitation, he returned to play one game for Stellenbosch University second XV (the Victorians) against the University of Cape Town in September 2006 and scored a try within the first 20 seconds. He made his return to first-class rugby as a starter in Western Province's home game against Griquas in the 2006 Currie Cup, and started again a week later, when WP lost in the semi-final to the Blue Bulls. He was named in the Stormers' squad for the 2007 Super 14, but, after playing in a pre-season warm-up game against a Boland team, continuing concerns about the neck injury forced him to announce his retirement from rugby on 22 January 2007. Already the owner of a fast-food outlet in Cape Town, he indicated that it was his intention to pursue his business interests.
