= Brent Russell =

South African rugby union player

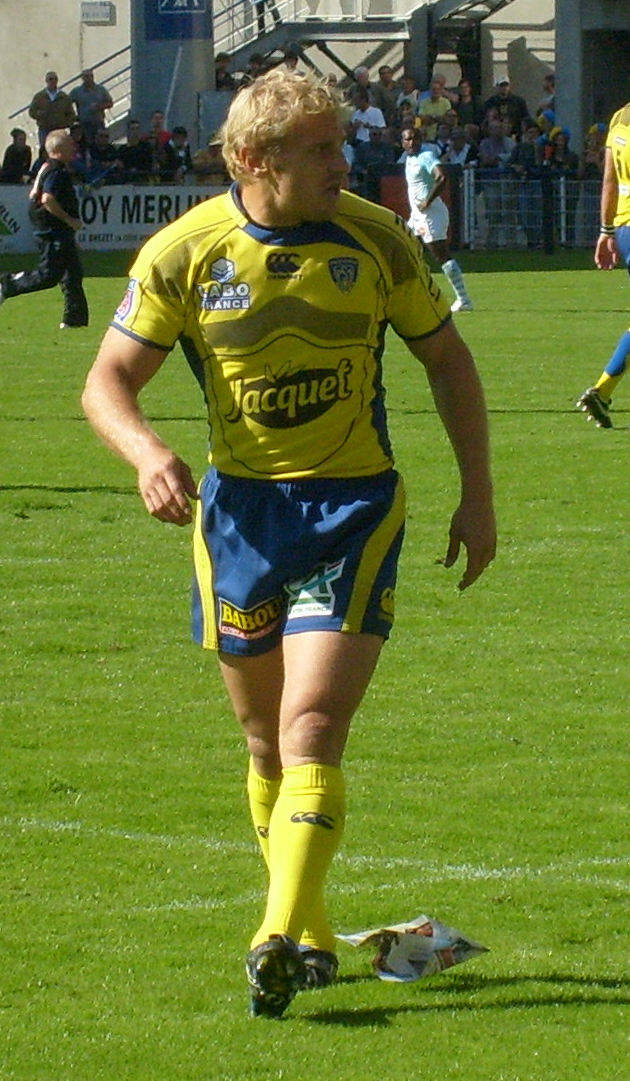
- Full name: Robert Brent Russell
- Born: 5 March 1980 (age 46) Port Elizabeth, Cape Province, South Africa
- Height: 1.74 m (5 ft 8 1/2 in)
- Weight: 83 kg (183 lb; 13 st 1 lb)
- School: Selborne College, St Stithians College
- University: University of Cape Town
- Notable relative: Shelley Jones (sister)

Rugby union career
- Position: Utility players
Senior career
Years	Team	Apps	(Points)
2002	Pumas	2	(10)
2003–2006	Sharks	37	(89)
2003–2006	Sharks (Currie Cup)	28	(112)
2006	Natal Wildebeest	5	(20)
2007	Stormers	11	(15)
2007	Western Province	4	(0)
2007–2008	Saracens	16	(27)
2008–2012	Clermont	58	(85)
2012–2013	Lille	16	(32)
International career
Years	Team	Apps	(Points)
2002–2006	South Africa	23	(40)

Robert Brent Russell (born 5 March 1980) is a South African retired professional rugby union player. He is a "utility back" (capable of playing fullback, fly-half or wing) who plays for Clermont in the French Top 14. Previously, he had played with Saracens in England, and before that the Sharks in the Currie Cup and the Sharks in the Super 14 for many years. He also featured frequently in the Springbok squad before his departure for Europe. He won 23 caps and scored 40 points (8 tries) for his country. Russell is known by the nickname Pocket Rocket.

His sister, Shelley, was also a South African field hockey international.

== National team ==
Russell was born in Port Elizabeth, but was schooled at Selborne College in East London. He was quickly brought up to international rugby level when he was selected for the 2002 Springboks team after making a good impression whilst in the national sevens team. In that year, he scored a try in the Tri Nations against the Australian Wallabies in which he wriggled out of a tackle and successfully eluded several Wallabies on his way to the tryline. However, he has not been able to consistently break into the Boks lineup in recent years. He is a relatively small player, but what he lacks in size and strength he makes up in speed, acceleration and agility.

== Club rugby ==
Russell is said to be good in any position, with coaches unsure in which position to place him. Although a favorite with the fans and a player of talent, he made few starts for the Sharks during the 2005/06 season, forcing him to make a move to Western Province where it was said he would be given plenty of game time and would also see him play at fly-half for the Stormers in the Super 14 rather than the utility role he fulfilled at the Sharks.

Russell signed for Saracens F.C. in time for their campaign in 2007. In 2008 Russell signed for ASM Clermont Auvergne in the French Top 14.
