= Willie Meyer =

South African rugby union player

- Born: 6 November 1967 (age 59) Port Elizabeth, Eastern Province
- Height: 1.85 m (6 ft 1 in)
- Weight: 120 kg (265 lb)
- School: Marlow Agricultural High School, Cradock, Eastern Cape

Rugby union career
Provincial / State sides
Years	Team	Apps	(Points)
1989–1996	Eastern Province	105	
1997–1998	Cheetahs	35	
1999–2002	Golden Lions	34	
Super Rugby
Years	Team	Apps	(Points)
1998–2002	Cats	46	(5)
International career
Years	Team	Apps	(Points)
1995–2002	South Africa	26	(5)

Willie Meyer (born 6 November 1967) is a South African former rugby union player.

== Playing career ==
Meyer represented North Eastern Cape schools at the annual Craven Week tournaments in 1984 and 1985. He made his provincial debut for Eastern Province in 1989 and played 105 matches for the union, before relocating to the Free State in 1997. From 1999 to 2002, he played for the Golden Lions in the South African provincial competitions and the Cats in Super Rugby.

Meyer was selected as part of the end of year touring party to Italy and England in 1995, and sat on the bench for both tests. He played his first test match for the Springboks against Scotland on 6 December 1997 at Murrayfield in Edinburgh. His next Test match was in 1999 and he played in three Tests during the year. However, Meyer was a regular member of the Springbok team from 2000 and played 22 Tests from 2000 to 2002. He also played in five tour matches, scoring one try for the Springboks.

=== Test history ===
No.	Opponents	Results (SA 1st)	Position	Tries	Dates	Venue
1.	Scotland	68–10	Replacement		6 Dec 1997	Murrayfield, Edinburgh
2.	Italy	101–0	Tighthead prop		19 Jun 1999	Kings Park, Durban
3.	New Zealand	0–28	Replacement		10 Jul 1999	Carisbrook, Dunedin
4.	Australia	6–32	Replacement		17 Jul 1999	Suncorp Stadium, Brisbane
5.	Canada	51–18	Replacement		10 Jun 2000	Basil Kenyon Stadium, East London
6.	England	18–13	Tighthead prop		17 Jun 2000	Loftus Versfeld, Pretoria
7.	New Zealand	12–25	Replacement		22 Jul 2000	Jade Stadium, Christchurch
8.	New Zealand	46–40	Replacement		19 Aug 2000	Ellis Park, Johannesburg
9.	Argentina	37–33	Tighthead prop		12 Nov 2000	River Plate Stadium, Buenos Aires
10.	Ireland	28–18	Tighthead prop		19 Nov 2000	Lansdowne Road, Dublin
11.	Wales	23–13	Tighthead prop		26 Nov 2000	Millennium Stadium, Cardiff
12.	England	17–25	Tighthead prop		2 Dec 2000	Twickenham, London
13.	France	23–32	Replacement		16 Jun 2001	Ellis Park, Johannesburg
14.	France	20–15	Tighthead prop		23 Jun 2001	Kings Park, Durban
15.	Italy	60–14	Tighthead prop		30 Jun 2001	Boet Erasmus, Port Elizabeth
16.	France	10–20	Replacement		10 Nov 2001	Stade de France, Paris
17.	Italy	54–26	Tighthead prop	1	17 Nov 2001	Stadio Luigi Ferraris, Genoa
18.	England	9–29	Tighthead prop		24 Nov 2001	Twickenham, London
19.	United States	43–20	Replacement		1 Dec 2001	Robertson Stadium, Houston
20.	Wales	34–19	Tighthead prop		8 Jun 2002	Free State Stadium, Bloemfontein
21.	Wales	19–8	Tighthead prop		15 Jun 2002	Newlands, Cape Town
22.	Argentina	49–29	Tighthead prop		29 Jun 2002	PAM Brink Stadium, Springs
23.	New Zealand	20–41	Tighthead prop		20 Jul 2002	Westpac Stadium, Wellington
24.	New Zealand	23–30	Tighthead prop		10 Aug 2002	Kings Park, Durban
25.	Australia	33–31	Tighthead prop		17 Aug 2002	Ellis Park, Johannesburg
26.	France	10–30	Tighthead prop		9 Nov 2002	Stade Velodrome, Marseilles

== See also ==
- List of South Africa national rugby union players – Springbok no. 663
