= AJ Venter =

South African rugby union player

- Born: Albertus Johannes Venter; 29 July 1973 (age 53) Bethulie, Free State, South Africa
- Height: 1.98 m (6 ft 6 in)
- Weight: 106 kg (16 st 10 lb)
- School: Technical High School Louis Botha, Bloemfontein
- University: Technicon Bloemfontein

Rugby union career
- Position: Versatile Forward
Senior career
| Years | Team | Apps | (Points) |
| 1997-1998 | Free State Cheetahs | 29 | (50) |
| 1998–1999 | Golden Lions | 19 | (15) |
| 1999 | Golden Lions | 18 | (50) |
| 2000–2007 | Sharks | 58 | (40) |
| 2000–2008 | Sharks | 96 | (55) |
| 2005 | Natal Wildebeest | 1 | (0) |
| 2008 | Western Province | 14 | (5) |
| 2009 | Stormers | 10 | (0) |
| 1997–2009 | Total | 245 | (215) |
- Correct as of 2 November 2021
International career
| Years | Team | Apps | (Points) |
| 1998, 2003 | South Africa 'A' | 2 | (0) |
| 2000–2004, 2006 | South Africa (test) | 25 | (0) |
| 2000 | South Africa (tour) | 3 | (0) |
| 2006 | South Africa XV | 1 | (0) |
- Correct as of 2 November 2021

Official website
- https://www.lifewithaj.net

AJ Venter (born 29 July 1973) is a retired South African rugby union footballer, who played rugby for the Sharks in the international Super Rugby competition, and the Sharks in the domestic Currie Cup competition. Venter also played for the South African national team, the Springboks.

Venter made his debut for South Africa on 26 November 2000 in a Test against Wales in Cardiff, and went on to represent the Springboks 25 times. His usual position was as flanker, but he also played at lock or No 8.

After retiring from professional rugby, Venter up-skilled himself within the financial sector and worked with institutions like ABSA and Old Mutual.

== Playing career ==
In 2002, Venter, along with Richie McCaw of New Zealand, saved referee David McHugh from injury when a drunk South African fan ran onto the pitch during a 2002 Tri-Nations game between South Africa and New Zealand in Durban. McCaw wrestled the fan off the referee while Venter ran and tackled both McCaw and the fan to the ground before the rest of the players attempted to drag him off as security ran onto the field.

AJ Venter was selected for the second-string squad for the away legs of the 2007 Tri Nations Series in Australia and New Zealand as almost 20 first team players were either rested or injured. However he decided to retire from International rugby and hence withdrew from the Springboks touring squad. His retirement meant that he also missed out on a possible World Cup place with the Springboks, but he cited personal and business commitments in Durban and South Africa as his reasons for the retirement.

Venter continued playing for the Sharks until the end of the 2008 Super 14 competition.

Later in the year, Venter rekindled his passion for the game after a lack of game time, including a controversial exclusion from the Sharks semi-final team. He joined the Stormers (Western Province) on a short-term contract, before finally hanging up his boots.

== Personal life ==
Venter is in a relationship with Danielle Oldfield. He also had two divorces in his early life. Venter has talked about experiencing anxiety and does a keynote on the lessons learned from these moments of hardship and runs a life skills program for school kids.
