= Adrian Jacobs =

South African rugby union player

- Born: Adrian Abraham Jacobs; 14 August 1980 (age 46) Kraaifontein, Western Cape, South Africa
- Height: 1.79 m (5 ft 10 in)
- Weight: 91 kg (14 st 5 lb)
- School: Scottsville Senior Secondary, Kraaifontein

Rugby union career
- Position(s): Centre, Wing, Flyhalf, Fullback
Provincial / State sides
Years	Team	Apps	(Points)
2001–2003	Falcons	46	
2004–2012	Sharks		
- Correct as of 27 September 2007
Super Rugby
Years	Team	Apps	(Points)
2001–2002	Bulls	21	(45)
2003	Cats	4	(5)
2004-2011	Sharks	89	(?)
- Correct as of 27 September 2007
International career
Years	Team	Apps	(Points)
2001–2011	South Africa	34	(35)
- Correct as of 19 November 2013

Adrian Abraham 'Adi' Jacobs (born 14 August 1980) is a South African former rugby union footballer who played for the Sharks provincially and The Sharks in Super Rugby.

== Playing career ==
Jacobs represented the Western Province Schools team at the annual Craven Week tournament in 1998 and was affectionately nicknamed Toff-O-Luxe because of his love for the English toffee. He was selected for the SA Schools team that very same year. He made his provincial debut for the Falcons in 2000.

Jacobs made his Springboks debut in 2001 against Italy in Genoa. A year later he came on as a replacement in the humiliating 53–3 loss against England at Twickenham and did not feature again for the Springboks for another six years. He returned to the South African side a year after they had won the World Cup and he managed to hold down a permanent position at outside centre alongside Jean de Villiers, in a Springbok backline that was still struggling to find its best configuration.

Playing for the Sharks, Adi missed out on a 2006 Currie Cup semi-final spot after sustaining an injury in the penultimate match, in a season where he gained selection in 16 matches despite being hampered by injury.

He was the first choice No 13 during 2008, by then being a very experienced midfielder, having played provincial rugby for more than a decade. South Africa trounced Australia 53–8 at Ellis Park, Johannesburg in August 2008. With five minutes into the second half Jean de Villiers off-loaded to Adi Jacobs in a gap, and the little man outstripped the defense and pulled a ham-string, fumbling over for South Africa's fifth try, resulting in a health lead of 34-3 after Butch James' conversion.

In 2009 he played the first two Tests against the British & Irish Lions as the Springboks won the series after two nail-biting victories in Durban and Pretoria.

Jacobs, who has retired from all rugby in 2012 struggled with injuries late in his career and missed a lot of rugby for the Sharks and the Springboks and his last game for the Springboks was on 30 July 2011 against New Zealand in Wellington, aged 30.

He had 34 caps for the Springboks, with 14 coming as a substitute.

== Honours ==
SA Rugby Young Player of the Year nominee, (2001); SA Rugby Player of the Year nominee (2008).

== See also ==
- List of South Africa national rugby union players – Springbok no. 721
- List of South Africa national under-18 rugby union team players
