= Jannes Labuschagne =

South African rugby union player

- Full name: Jan Johannes Labuschagne
- Born: 16 April 1976 (age 50) Bloemhof, South Africa
- Height: 1.96 m (6 ft 5 in)
- Weight: 116 kg (18 st 4 lb; 256 lb)

Rugby union career
- Position: Lock
Senior career
Years	Team	Apps	(Points)
2000–2009	Lions	35	(10)
2008–2010	Golden Lions	5	(0)
- Correct as of 13 March 2021
International career
Years	Team	Apps	(Points)
2000–2002	South Africa	11	(0)
- Correct as of 22:04, 12 March 2021 (UTC)

Jan Johannes Labuschagne (born 16 April 1976) is a South African former rugby union player. He played as a lock. He was capped 11 times for the Springboks.

While playing for South Africa against England, Labuschagne was shown a red card in the 23rd minute for a late tackle on Jonny Wilkinson. South Africa went on to lose 53–3, a record defeat. For his actions, Labuschagne was suspended for 23 days and never represented South Africa again.
