= Lukas van Biljon =

South African rugby union player

- Born: 18 March 1976 (age 50) Bloemfontein, South Africa
- Height: 6 ft 2 in (188 cm)
- Weight: 236 lb (107 kg)

Rugby union career
- Position: Hooker
International career
Years	Team	Apps	(Points)
2001–03	South Africa	13	(5)

Lukas van Biljon (born 18 March 1976) is a South African former rugby union international.

Born in Bloemfontein, van Biljon attended Welkom-Gimnasium and represented the Springboks in 13 Test matches between 2001 and 2003, mostly as a hooker. He was considered a likely selection for the 2003 Rugby World Cup but was axed from the training squad due to his involvement in a car park brawl.

In 2023, van Biljon suffered stab wounds during a raid on his family farm in Oranjeville, Free State. His father André was shot at close range while trying to radio for help and died of his injuries.

== See also ==
- List of South Africa national rugby union players
