= Simon Maling =

NZ international rugby union player (born 1975)

- Maling on Lake Wānaka
- Born: Thomas Simon Maling; 3 June 1975 (age 51) Christchurch, New Zealand
- Height: 1.97 m (6 ft 6 in)
- Weight: 110 kg (17 st 5 lb)
- School: Christ's College
- University: University of Otago

Rugby union career
- Position: Lock
- Current team: Llanelli Scarlets
Provincial / State sides
| Years | Team | Apps | (Points) |
| 1996–2004 | Otago | 73 | (0) |
| 2004–2008 | Suntory Sungoliath | | |
| 2008–2009 | Llanelli Scarlets | 9 | (0) |
Super Rugby
| Years | Team | Apps | (Points) |
| 1997–2004 | Otago Highlanders | 66 | (15) |
International career
| Years | Team | Apps | (Points) |
| 2001–2004 | New Zealand | 11 | (0) |

Thomas Simon Maling (born 3 June 1975) is a retired New Zealand rugby union footballer and former All Black. His usual playing position was at lock. He played for most of his rugby career in New Zealand for the Otago Highlanders and the All Blacks from 1996 - 2004 before heading overseas to London to play part of one season at Harlequins in 2004 before heading to Japan. He joined the Scarlets at the start of the 2008–09 European season, leaving Suntory Sungoliath in Japan, where he played for three years from 2005 to 2008. In mid-2009, at age 34, Maling hung up his boots and retired from rugby and returned to his native New Zealand to live.

== Early life ==
Maling was born 3 June 1975 in Christchurch, New Zealand. He grew up in Cashmere, Christchurch and attended Christ's College where he excelled at both rowing and rugby union. Upon finishing school he moved to Dunedin to study at the University of Otago.

As a student at the University of Otago he shared a flat with fellow former All Blacks Anton Oliver and Tony Brown and earned the nickname 'Donk'.

His first class debut came with three matches for New Zealand Colts in 1996, two of them at the Southern Hemisphere Under 21 tournament. The following year he made three Super 14 appearances for the Highlanders, played once for the Rugby Academy and had eight matches for Otago, mostly as a replacement.

== Early career ==
Maling played for the Otago Highlanders in the Super 14 competition starting in 1997 for a total of seven years. In 1999, with Maling in good form, the Highlanders reached the Super 14 final where they were narrowly defeated by the Canterbury Crusaders by a score of 24–19.

During most of this time he was one of the Highlanders key players, playing at lock, and known for his energy, reliability in the line out, and good work rate. He played 11 tests for the All Blacks since making his international debut against Italy in 2001 and he was an All Black for four years. He studied at the University of Otago where he gained his Bachelor of Commerce degree.

Maling's failure to make the 2003 All Black squad for the Rugby World Cup came as a major disappointment and as a surprise to many commentators as he had been the inform lock and the best line-out jumper in the Super 12 competition leading up to the Rugby World Cup. Nevertheless, he had been struggling with injuries earlier in the season and this may have cost him his place.

== Later career ==
In 2004, following the 2003 Rugby World Cup, Maling made it back into the All Blacks and played all four tri-nations tests that year. However, at the end of the 2004 season the New Zealand Rugby Almanack commented that "Simon Maling lacked the enthusiasm of earlier in his career". Nevertheless, the shortage of good locks in New Zealand at the time of his retirement from All Black rugby meant that if he had stayed longer in New Zealand he might have expected to continue with the All Blacks for a while longer.

In 2004, Maling's All Black career ended with a disheartening 40–26 loss to South Africa. Having played in 11 tests, Maling headed overseas first to London in late 2004 where after a brief spell with Harlequins he headed on to Japan where he joined Japanese club Suntory Sungoliath.

In 2006, Suntory Sungoliath lost the final of the Top League and Microsoft Cup title to Toshiba Brave Lupus by a score of 33–18. Then in February 2007, Suntory Sungoliath again lost the final of the Top League and Microsoft Cup title to Toshiba Brave Lupus before a crowd of 23,076 at Tokyo's Chichibunomiya Stadium, the first sellout at the ground in 10 years. The score was 14–13 to Toshiba Brave Lupus. According to Maling, the team was totally gutted by the loss. However Suntory with Maling in the team won the fifth Microsoft Cup on 24 February 2008 to become champions of the Top League for 2007–08.

On 5 February 2008 it was announced that Maling would join Llanelli Scarlets for the 2008/09 season. In April 2009 him and Gavin Thomas were released because of the clause in their contract that said if they were injured for more than 26 weeks they would be released.

Maling returned to New Zealand to live in 2009, where he now farms in the South Island close to Wānaka.

== Summary ==
As a line-out specialist, Maling was noted for his technical execution and activity rate, although he had a smaller physical profile to dominate at the very top level. But he was a respected opponent at all levels and represented the All Blacks in 13 matches (11 tests).

Maling was on the winning side in 9 of the 11 tests in which he played, a winning percentage of 81%.
