= Faan Rautenbach =

South African rugby union player

- Full name: Stefanus Johannes Rautenbach
- Born: 22 February 1976 (age 50) Bethlehem, South Africa
- Height: 1.91 m (6 ft 3 in)
- Weight: 130 kg (20 st 7 lb; 287 lb)

Rugby union career
- Position: Prop
Senior career
Years	Team	Apps	(Points)
2005–2012	London Irish	137	(10)
International career
Years	Team	Apps	(Points)
2002–2004	South Africa	14	(5)

Stefanus Johannes "Faan" Rautenbach (born 22 February 1976) is a former rugby union footballer who played at prop for London Irish, Western Province and the Stormers.

Rautenbach played 14 Tests for the Springboks including a try on debut against Wales in 2002, ending with his last Test against New Zealand in Christchurch in 2004. Rautenbach is known as a powerful scrummager.
