= Joe McDonnell (rugby union) =

NZ international rugby union player

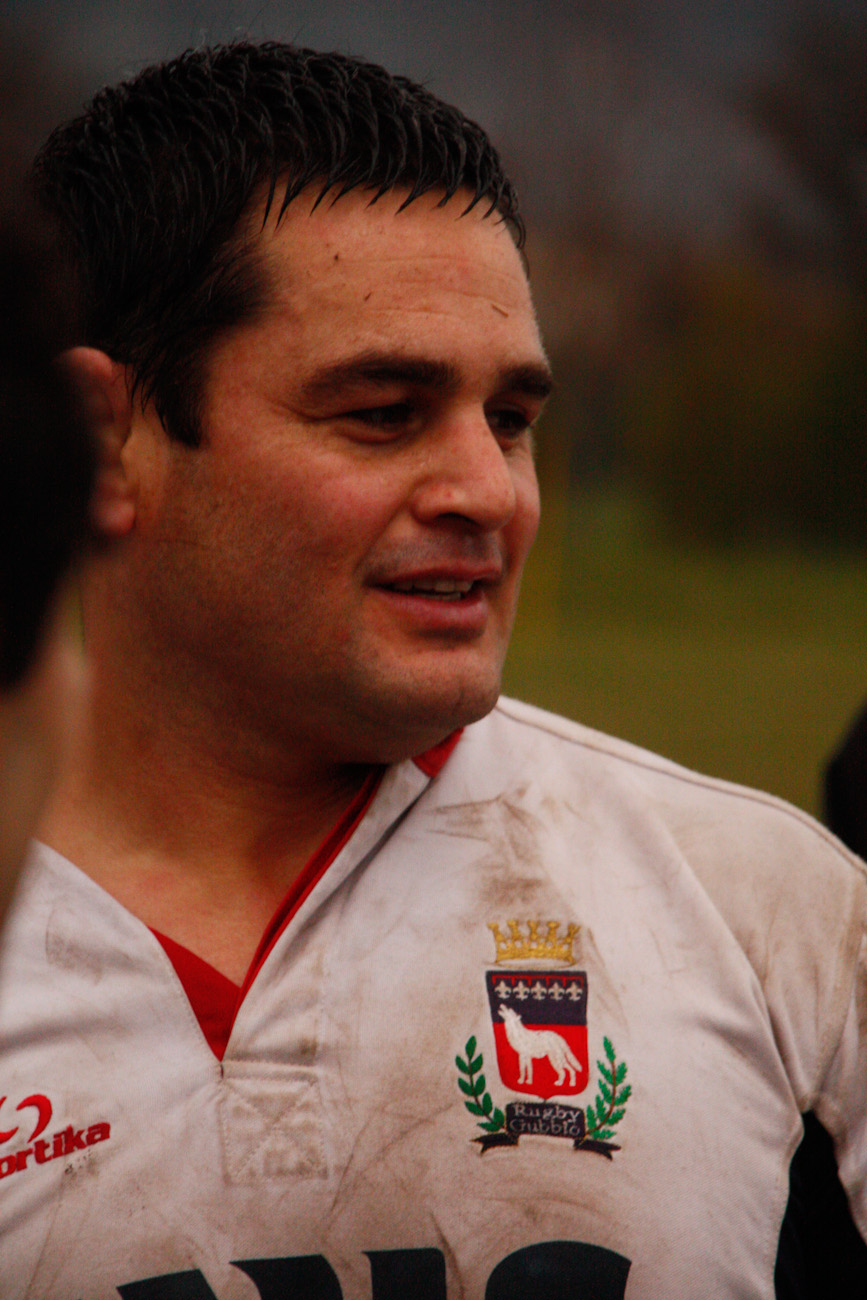
- Born: Joseph Michael McDonnell; 1 March 1973 (age 53) Hastings, New Zealand
- Height: 5 ft 9 in (1.75 m)
- Weight: 17.11 st (108.7 kg)
- School: King's High
- Occupation: Social worker

Rugby union career
- Position: Prop
- Current team: CR El Salvador
Amateur team(s)
Years	Team	Apps	(Points)
1994	Zingarei-Richmond		
Senior career
Years	Team	Apps	(Points)
2006/07 -	Newcastle Falcons	30	(10)
Provincial / State sides
Years	Team	Apps	(Points)
1998-2003	Otago	55	(20)
2000	Southland	1	(0)
2004-2006	Wellington		
Super Rugby
Years	Team	Apps	(Points)
1999-2003	Highlanders	31	(5)
2004-2006	Hurricanes	11	(0)
International career
Years	Team	Apps	(Points)
2002	New Zealand	8	(5)

Joseph Michael McDonnell (born 1 March 1973 in Hastings, New Zealand), is a rugby union coach who played eight tests for New Zealand. As of 2008 he plays for Newcastle Falcons in the Guinness Premiership and in 2009 he has joined the CR El Salvador. As of 2017, he is the head coach of Rugby Rovigo Delta.

McDonnell grew up in Te Aroha in the Waikato before moving to Central Otago, where he initially played rugby league. He represented Otago in league before switching to union. He played every game for Otago in the 1999 NPC and was included in the Highlanders squad for 2000. He saw less game time with the Highlanders, since his fellow props were all All Blacks: Carl Hoeft, Kees Meeuws and Carl Hayman. In 2000 he was also selected for the New Zealand Maori team and played in their 18-15 defeat of Scotland at New Plymouth.

McDonnell was something of a surprise selection for the 2002 All Blacks, but scored (his only) test try on debut against Italy. He appeared in eight tests in 2002, starting in the games against Italy, Fiji, England and France and coming on as a substitute in both tests against Ireland and two of New Zealand's tri-nations games against Australia and South Africa.

He took part in the 2003 tour of the United States and Canada by the New Zealand Maori team. and the team which won the Churchill Cup in 2006.

In 2004 he moved to Wellington, playing for the Hurricanes and Wellington Lions. He was in the squad for the 2006 Super 12 final, which the Hurricanes lost.

In his first two seasons at Newcastle he has made 30 appearances and score two tries.

While playing at Newcastle Falcons Joe McDonnell was part of the coaching staff at one of his local clubs BLYTH RUGBY CLUB who he helped get promoted into their current league Durham/Northumberland Division Two.

At the end of the 2008-2009 season he has joined the CR El Salvador, a team based in Valladolid (Spain), of the new iberian franchises' league Superibérica de Rugby, bringing to this new team his experienceand, also, he would like to help with forwards' training. He has been nominated as the Man of the Match in his first appearance: Vacceos Cavaliers vs. La Vila Mariners.

After two years spent in Rugby Gubbio as player and coach, he moved to top italian class team Delta Rovigo as a scrum coach. In 2015 Joe McDonnell has been promoted as head coach of the team and he dragged Rugby Rovigo Delta to the title of National Championship of Excellence for the season 2015-16.
