= Sam Broomhall =

New Zealand rugby union player

- Born: Sam Roger Broomhall; 29 July 1976 (age 50) Christchurch, New Zealand
- Height: 1.93 m (6 ft 4 in)
- Weight: 104 kg (229 lb)
- School: Ellesmere College
- Occupation: irrigation engineer

Rugby union career
- Position: Loose forward
Senior career
Years	Team	Apps	(Points)
2005–08	Clermont Auvergne		
Provincial / State sides
Years	Team	Apps	(Points)
2000–05	Canterbury	66	(35)
Super Rugby
Years	Team	Apps	(Points)
2001–05	Crusaders	55	(15)
International career
Years	Team	Apps	(Points)
2002	New Zealand	4	(0)

Sam Roger Broomhall (born 29 July 1976) is a former New Zealand rugby union player. A loose forward, Broomhall represented Canterbury at a provincial level and the Crusaders in Super Rugby. He was a member of the New Zealand national side, the All Blacks, in 2002 and played in four international matches. He played for French side Clermont Auvergne from 2005 to 2008.
