= Greg Somerville =

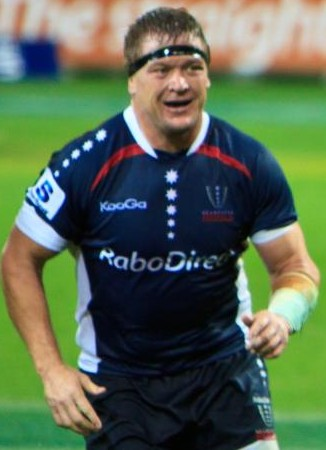
- Somerville in 2011
- Born: Greg Mardon Somerville; 28 November 1977 (age 48) Wairoa, New Zealand
- Height: 1.85 m (6 ft 1 in)
- Weight: 115 kg (18 st 2 lb)
- Occupation: Professional rugby player

Rugby union career
- Position: Prop
- Correct as of 31 March 2008
Senior career
Years	Team	Apps	(Points)
2008–10	Gloucester	36	(5)
Provincial / State sides
Years	Team	Apps	(Points)
1998–2008	Canterbury	56	
Super Rugby
Years	Team	Apps	(Points)
1999–2008	Crusaders	115	(45)
2011	Melbourne Rebels	16	(5)
International career
Years	Team	Apps	(Points)
2000–08	New Zealand	66	(5)

Greg Mardon Somerville is a New Zealand retired rugby union player. He is a former All Black and a specialised tighthead prop who can also play loosehead. Somerville made his All Black debut in 2000 against Tonga, a match in which the All Blacks won 102–0. Somerville went 41 test matches before scoring his first, and only test try against Fiji in 2005. Somerville played domestic rugby for Canterbury Rugby Football Union and for the Crusaders in the Super Rugby competition, having played 100 matches for the latter after debuting against the Chiefs in 1999. Somerville's nickname is Yoda, after the fictional character from Star Wars due to their resemblance.

Somerville left New Zealand in late 2008, having signed a two-and-a-half-year deal with the Guinness Premiership team Gloucester. In 2010 he left Gloucester for the Melbourne Rebels, with whom he spent the 2011 season before retiring.

Somerville's sporting hero is Buck Shelford, who, he says, "was a tremendous leader for the All Blacks and an outstanding front-rower."

== Other ==
- Played 42 matches for New Zealand before scoring his first try against Fiji in 2005. This was an All Blacks record at the time for the most matches before scoring a point.
- Played in six RWC 2003 matches.
- Played a leadership role for the Melbourne Rebels in the 2011 Super Rugby season.
