= Brendan Cannon =

- Born: 5 April 1973 (age 53) Brisbane, Queensland, Australia
- Height: 1.88 m (6 ft 2 in)
- Weight: 108 kg (17 st 0 lb)

Rugby union career
- Position: Hooker
- Current team: Retired
Provincial / State sides
Years	Team	Apps	(Points)
1994-2000	Queensland	71	(10)
2000-2003	New South Wales	47	(15)
- Correct as of 10 July 2014
Super Rugby
Years	Team	Apps	(Points)
1996–2000	Reds	19	(0)
2000–2005	Waratahs	70	(5)
2006–2007	Western Force	18	(0)
- Correct as of 10 July 2014
International career
Years	Team	Apps	(Points)
2001–2006	Australia	42	(10)

Brendan Cannon (born 5 April 1973) is a former Australian rugby union footballer who played for the national team, The Wallabies and three Australian teams in the Super 12 and Super 14 competitions.

Cannon played for both the Queensland Reds and the New South Wales Waratahs in the old Super 12 competition, prior to the entry of the Western Force, whom he played with for their first season. He has been capped 42 times for Australia, making his debut in 2001 against the touring British and Irish Lions team. He previously represented Australia at U21 and U19 level. He also played 106 Super Rugby games and was the 12th player in the competition's history to achieve that milestone. His retirement in April 2007 was due to a serious neck injury that he incurred in a game against Christchurch a few weeks earlier.

In 2007 he joined with representatives from each of the major football codes in Australia to launch the White ribbon day, a campaign to stop violence against women. Since retiring from playing, he has worked as a commentator for Fox Sports in Australia.
