= David Lyons (rugby union, born 1980) =

Australian rugby union player (born 1980)

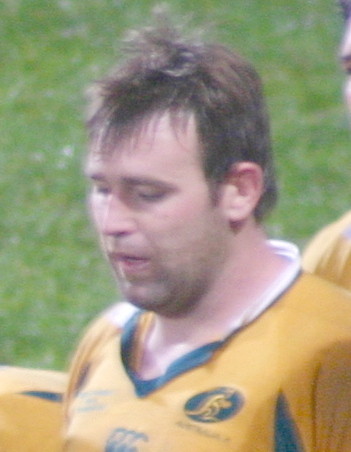
- Born: David Lyons; 15 June 1980 (age 46) Orange, New South Wales, Australia
- Height: 194 cm (6 ft 3½ in)
- Weight: 112 kg (17 st 9 lb)
- School: Molong Central School, Hurlstone Agricultural High School
- University: The University of Sydney, International University of Monaco

Rugby union career
- Position(s): Number eight, Flanker
- Current team: Stade Français
Senior career
Years	Team	Apps	(Points)
2000–08	Waratahs	105	(35)
2008–11	Scarlets	77	(30)
2011–2014	Stade Français	76	(20)
- Correct as of 3 May 2014
International career
Years	Team	Apps	(Points)
1997–98	Australia Schoolboys	5	(20)
2000–08	Australia	44	(25)
- Correct as of 13 July 2009

David Lyons (born 15 June 1980) is an Australia former professional rugby union player. He last played for Top 14 club Stade Français. His primary position was Number Eight and he also played for the Wallabies.

== Playing career ==
Lyons was born in Orange, New South Wales. From his debut in 2000 he played 83 consecutive games for the Waratahs, a record for an Australia player. In 2004 Lyons was awarded the John Eales medal as Wallabies player of the year.

Lyons signed a 4-year contract with Welsh team the Scarlets for the 2008–09 Magners League season, debuting against Bath Rugby in August 2008. In his first season, he remarkably started in all 30 of the Scarlets' league and cup matches. In July 2009 Lyons became vice-captain of the Scarlets for the 2009–10 Magners League season. He had previously captained the side in two matches at the end of the 2008–09 season However, due to an injury to regular skipper Mark Jones, he led the side for most of the season and eventually took over the captain's armband for the 2010–11 Magners League season. On 15 June 2011, Lyons was released by the Scarlets at the end of his third season with the club. The next day, he signed a contract with Stade Français.

Lyons played for the Barbarians against the Wallabies at the Sydney Football Stadium in June 2009.

In 2015, Lyons announced his retirement from professional rugby.

Preceded by Phil Waugh	John Eales Medal; 2004	Succeeded by Jeremy Paul
