= Corné Krige =

South African rugby union player

- Born: Cornelius Petrus Johannes Krige; 21 March 1975 (age 51) Lusaka, Zambia
- Height: 1.90 m (6 ft 3 in)
- Weight: 102 kg (225 lb)
- School: Paarl Boys' High School

Rugby union career
- Position: Flanker
Senior career
Years	Team	Apps	(Points)
2004–2005	Northampton Saints	19	(15)
Provincial / State sides
Years	Team	Apps	(Points)
1996–2002	Western Province	68	(38)
Super Rugby
Years	Team	Apps	(Points)
1999–2004	Stormers	56	(20)
International career
Years	Team	Apps	(Points)
1999–2003	South Africa	39	(10)

Cornelius Petrus Johannes "Corné" Krige (born 21 March 1975) is a retired South African rugby union player. He played flanker for Western Province in the Currie Cup, the Stormers in Super Rugby and captained the South African national side, the Springboks.

== Career ==
Corne Krige was born on 21 March 1975 in Lusaka, Zambia and his parents still reside in that country. He was schooled in South Africa at Paarl Boys' High School, about 60 km from Cape Town. He played most of his rugby for South African teams, and resides there.

Krige's Test debut came in 1999 after recovering from career-threatening knee and hand injuries. He captained the Springboks on his test debut in a 101–0 victory over Italy in Durban; two weeks later he suffered another serious knee injury against the All Blacks in Dunedin which ended his hopes of captaining the Springboks at the 1999 Rugby World Cup in Wales. Krige appeared in 39 tests for South Africa, became the full-time captain in 2002, and captained the Boks 18 times in all before his international retirement in January 2004.

Known for aggressive style of play, Krige was the subject of controversy after the November 2002 Test against England at Twickenham that saw England hand the Boks their then worst defeat. (53–3). During the match, an increasingly frustrated South Africa side began targeting England players with physical off-the-ball attacks, and match footage showed Krige as the leader. He later admitted in his autobiography that he had lost control as South Africa had gone into the match on the back of two defeats and that he had intentionally fouled the England players. His Super Rugby career then ended several weeks early when he was handed an eight-week ban for head-butting an opponent in 2004.

He finished his career in the English Premiership with Northampton Saints, signing for the 2004–05 season. He retired at the end of that season and returned to Cape Town to pursue business interests. Krige made one more high-profile appearance on a rugby field, captaining a Western Province XV against a World XV in his testimonial at Newlands on 9 June 2006. The testimonial highly benefited Reach For A Dream, a charity similar to and inspired by the Make-A-Wish Foundation in the United States. The World XV won 49–31 in an entertaining match that saw 12 tries in all.

Krige and former Springbok teammates Bobby Skinstad and Robbie Fleck were business partners, owning Billie the B.U.M.S. Restaurant and a Cocktail Bar in Newlands. The restaurant has since closed.

When the Boks played the Australia Wallabies during the later years of Krige's captaincy, he and Wallabies captain George Gregan shared an unusual distinction: they were born in the same hospital.

== Other Works ==
In 2014, Krige appeared on Survivor South Africa: Champions as one of two "captains", alongside Mark Fish.

Sporting positions
Preceded by Gary Teichmann	Springbok Captain; 1999 & 2002–03	Succeeded by Rassie Erasmus
