= Marius Joubert =

South African rugby union player

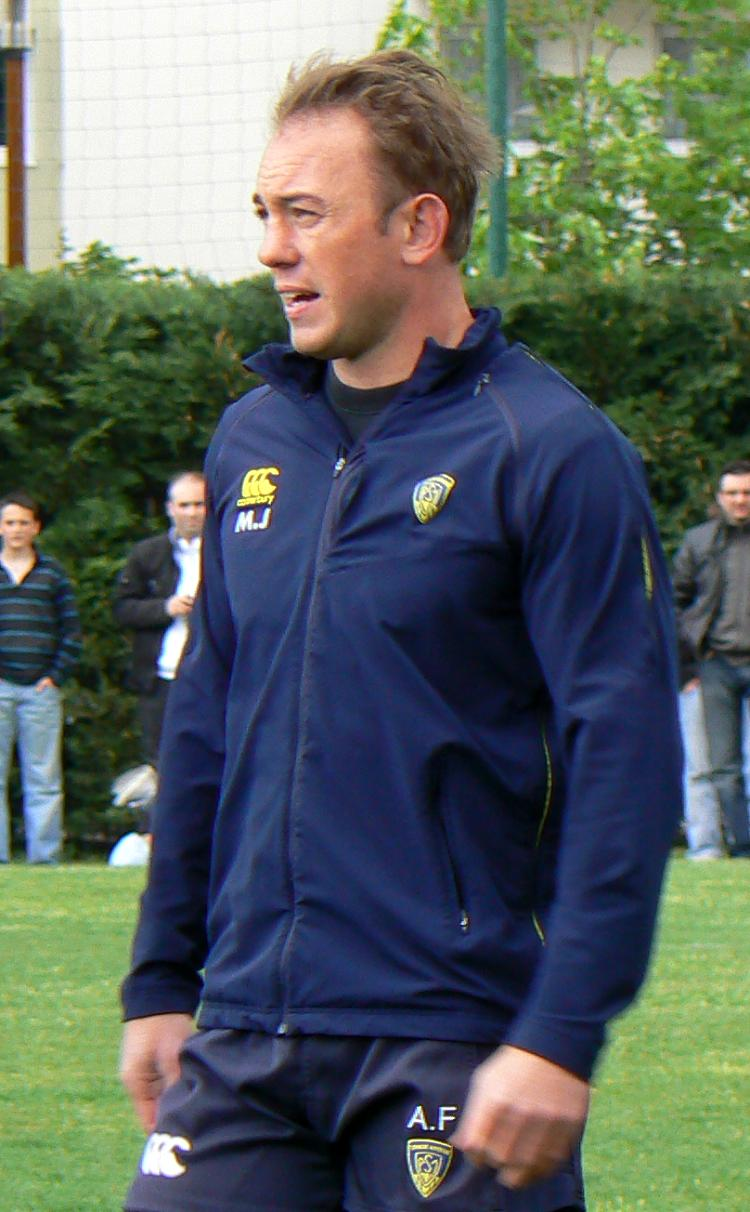
- Joubert during a practice session
- Born: Marius Charl Joubert; 10 July 1979 (age 47) Paarl, South Africa
- Height: 1.88 m (6 ft 2 in)
- Weight: 94 kg (14 st 11 lb)
- School: Paarl Gimnasium

Rugby union career
- Position: Centre
Senior career
Years	Team	Apps	(Points)
2008–2011	Clermont	66	(70)
- Correct as of 10 April 2012
Provincial / State sides
Years	Team	Apps	(Points)
1999–2001	Boland Cavaliers	37	(90)
2002–2006	Western Province	15	(35)
2007	Free State Cheetahs	15	(10)
2011–present	Sharks	29	(10)
- Correct as of 7 May 2013
Super Rugby
Years	Team	Apps	(Points)
2002–2006	Stormers	46	(55)
2007	Cheetahs	12	(0)
2012	Sharks	3	(0)
- Correct as of 20 May 2012
International career
Years	Team	Apps	(Points)
2001–2005	South Africa	30	(45)
- Correct as of 10 April 2012

Marius Charl Joubert (born 10 July 1979 in Paarl, Western Cape) is a South African rugby union player who played as a centre for Stormers in Super Rugby. He has previously played for the Boland Cavaliers, Free State Cheetahs, ASM Clermont Auvergne and Western Province in the Currie Cup and the Stormers and the Cheetahs in Super Rugby. Joubert was educated at Paarl Gimnasium, alongside current Springboks and former Western Province and Stormers teammates De Wet Barry and Jean de Villiers. A few years later, the same school produced another current Springbok star in Schalk Burger.

Joubert started his career at the Boland Cavaliers where he played from 1999 to 2001 when he joined Western Province from 2002 to 2006. He made his debut for South Africa against New Zealand in 2001 and in that very game, picked up a serious knee injury. Despite several injury setbacks (one of which, a badly damaged shoulder, kept him out of the 2003 World Cup), Joubert continued to develop into a world-class centre.

He was a member of the 2004 Springbok squad that won the Tri-Nations. In the Boks' home match at Ellis Park in Johannesburg against the All Blacks, he became only the second Springbok in history (after Ray Mordt in 1981) to score a hat-trick of tries against the All Blacks. Joubert was also for a time South Africa's leading try scorer in Tri Nations play, with six tries, before being overtaken by Breyton Paulse.

During the 2006 Super 14 season. Joubert's form dipped dramatically due to several injury problems. Firstly he struggled with a back injury that kept him from playing in the Currie Cup. He then sustained a back injury that kept him out of the Currie Cup and the Springboks' year-end tour to Argentina, Wales and France. He returned to play for the Stormers in the Super 14, only to break his hand in their final fixture. On 11 September 2006, the Cheetahs announced that Joubert had signed for them for the upcoming 2007 season, thus ending Joubert's 5-year association with the Stormers and Western Province Rugby Union.

Joubert won the 2007 Currie Cup with the Free State Cheetahs and the 2010 French Championship with ASM Clermont Auvergne.

Joubert is 6'3"/1.91 m and weighs 202 lb/91.5 kg.

== Honours ==
- 2004 Tri-Nations winner (Springboks)
- 2007 Currie Cup winner (Free State Cheetahs)
- 2010 French Champions: ASM Clermont Auvergne
