= Marty Holah =

NZ & Maori international rugby union player

- Born: Martin Rowan Holah; 10 September 1976 (age 50) Hamilton, New Zealand
- Height: 1.84 m (6 ft 0 in)
- Weight: 101 kg (15 st 13 lb)
- School: St John's College

Rugby union career
- Position: Flanker
Senior career
| Years | Team | Apps | (Points) |
| 2007–11 | Ospreys | 93 | (10) |
- Correct as of 18 April 2011
Provincial / State sides
| Years | Team | Apps | (Points) |
| 1999–2007, 2011– | Waikato | 87 | (50) |
- Correct as of 9 October 2014
Super Rugby
| Years | Team | Apps | (Points) |
| 2001–07 | Chiefs | 81 | (15) |
International career
| Years | Team | Apps | (Points) |
| 2001–06 | New Zealand | 36 | (15) |
| – | NZ Maori | | |

Martin Rowan Holah (born 10 September 1976 in Hamilton, New Zealand) is a New Zealand former rugby union player, who has played for Welsh regional side Ospreys, the Waikato provincial team and the Chiefs Super Rugby franchise. Holah was capped in 36 international test matches for the New Zealand national team, the All Blacks.

The Waikato flanker made his debut for the All Blacks on 16 June 2001 against Samoa at Albany. He is known for his ability to steal the ball in the tackle. Holah was instrumental in the NZ Māori's defeat of the British & Irish Lions during the 2005 tour at his home ground, Waikato Stadium.

In 2006, Holah was named in the unfamiliar position of blind-side flanker for the test against Ireland in Hamilton, his first start in the All Black jersey since 2004.

On 14 August 2007, it was announced that Holah had signed a two-year contract with the Celtic League champions, the Ospreys. He enjoyed his time there, later signing a one-season extension on his contract. In the 2009/10 season he was named Ospreys' Coaches Player of the Year, having been named Man of the Match against the Leicester Tigers in a must-win Heineken Cupmatch with a heroic individual defensive display, which he reproduced multiple times in helping the Ospreys to lift the Magners League title that year.

On 18 April 2011 it was announced Holah would return home to play for Waikato in the 2011 ITM Cup. Holah became a regular member of the starting side.
