= Reuben Thorne =

NZ international rugby union player

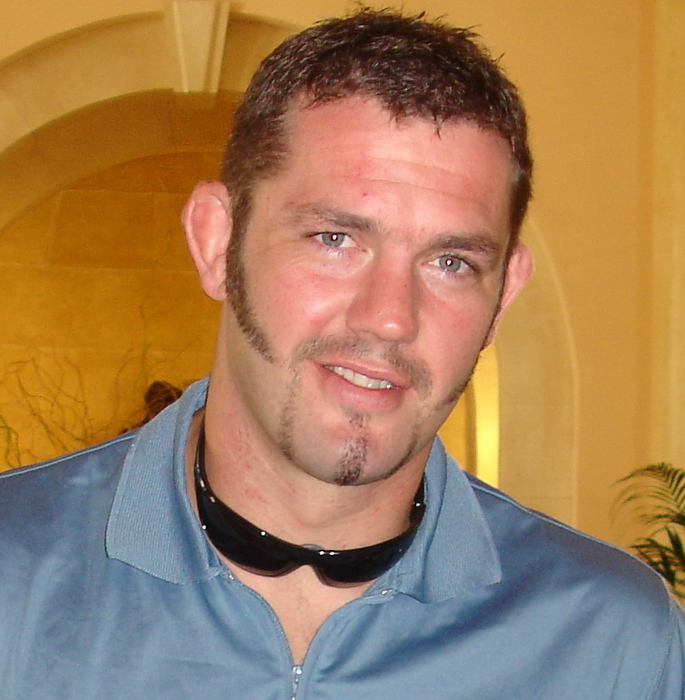
- Thorne in 2005
- Born: Reuben David Thorne; 2 January 1975 (age 51) Christchurch, New Zealand
- Height: 1.92 m (6 ft 4 in)
- Weight: 107 kg (16 st 12 lb)
- School: New Plymouth Boys' High School
- University: Lincoln University
- Notable relative: Andrew Mehrtens (brother-in-law)

Rugby union career
- Position(s): Lock, Flanker
Senior career
| Years | Team | Apps | (Points) |
| 2008–2009 | Yamaha Jubilo | | |
Provincial / State sides
| Years | Team | Apps | (Points) |
| 1996–2008 | Canterbury | 71 | |
Super Rugby
| Years | Team | Apps | (Points) |
| 1997–2008 | Crusaders | 129 | (25) |
International career
| Years | Team | Apps | (Points) |
| 1999–2007 | New Zealand | 50 | (25) |

Reuben David Thorne (born 2 January 1975) is a New Zealand rugby union player, and former captain of the national team, the All Blacks. Now involved with Big Brother Big Sister and is the Christ College first XV coach.

== Professional career and the All Blacks ==
=== Super 12 ===
Playing as a flanker, Thorne first appeared in the Super 12 with the Canterbury Crusaders in 1998. He became captain in 2002, immediately leading the Crusaders to Super 12 victory in an unprecedented "perfect" season—13 wins from 13 games. In 2003 and 2004 the Crusaders were runners-up in the Super 12 under his leadership.

Thorne was a rarity among All Blacks, especially captains, in that he never made an international appearance at any age-group level. He earned his first All Black cap in 1999, playing a single test against the Springboks before the 1999 Rugby Union World Cup. Taking over as captain from an injured Anton Oliver, he led the All Blacks throughout 2002 and 2003, apart from a brief tour of the UK and France in November 2002 which he missed due to a chronic ankle problem, causing former captain Taine Randell to be briefly recalled to the skipper's role. Although the team's record was excellent under Thorne's leadership (playing 22 test matches for 19 wins and 3 losses, and winning the Tri Nations Series both years and the Bledisloe Cup in 2003), his captaincy ended on a low note as the team was eliminated by the Wallabies in the semi-finals of the 2003 Rugby Union World Cup. Following the World Cup, Thorne was replaced as All Blacks captain by Tana Umaga.

Thorne appeared again for the All Blacks on the 2004 end of year tour, where he was an unused reserve against Wales at the Millennium Stadium in Cardiff and started as a lock against the Barbarians at Twickenham. He was called in as a replacement for Jono Gibbes, who was ruled out of the tour due to injury. His record as an All Black stands at 50 tests played (22 as captain) for 42 wins and 8 losses, with 5 tries scored.

=== Super 14 ===
On 28 May 2006 Thorne was named captain for the 2006 Junior All Blacks season , but the next day he withdrew from the squad to undertake "a recovery and reconditioning programme." Thorne was a surprise selection for the All Blacks for the 2006 Tri Nations Series when it was named on 26 June 2006. On 22 July 2006, he played his first test for the All Blacks since the 2003 Rugby World Cup, against the same team he debuted against, the Springboks. He was then rested for the first half of the 2007 Super 14 season as part of the All Blacks reconditioning programme. He returned to play for the Crusaders that year, and was picked in the All Blacks squad for the 2007 Tri Nations Series and the 2007 Rugby World Cup. Although he did play in the 2007 World Cup he was not in the team for the All Blacks quarter-final loss to France. On 29 November 2007 Thorne announced that following the 2008 Super 14 season he left New Zealand to play for Yamaha Jubilo in Japan. He currently plays for the Honda Heat.

Thorne was called into the Crusaders squad following numerous injuries for matches in South Africa in the 2011 Super 15. Thorne made his return on the bench against the Cheetahs.

== See also ==
- Tahora, Manawatu-Wanganui, Tahora Primary School
- High School Old Boys RFC

Sporting positions
| Preceded by Anton Oliver | All Blacks Captain; 2002–2003 | Succeeded by Tana Umaga |
