= Caleb Ralph =

New Zealand rugby union player

- Born: Caleb Stan Ralph; 10 September 1977 (age 49) Rotorua, New Zealand
- Height: 187 cm (6 ft 2 in)
- Weight: 93 kg (14 st 9 lb; 205 lb)
- School: Western Heights High School
- Occupation: Professional rugby union footballer

Rugby union career
- Position(s): Centre, wing
Provincial / State sides
Years	Team	Apps	(Points)
1996–97	Bay of Plenty	25	
1998–99	Auckland	17	
2000–06	Canterbury	66	
2007	Tasman	6	(0)
Super Rugby
Years	Team	Apps	(Points)
1997	Chiefs	3	(15)
1998–99	Blues	6	(15)
2000–09	Crusaders	126	(260)
2011	Reds	1	(0)
International career
Years	Team	Apps	(Points)
1998–2003	New Zealand	14	(45)
–	New Zealand Māori	13	
National sevens team
Years	Team		Comps
1996–2000	New Zealand 7s		
Medal record
Men's rugby sevens
Representing New Zealand
Commonwealth Games
Gold medal – first place	1998 Kuala Lumpur	Team competition

Caleb Stan Ralph (born 10 September 1977 in Rotorua) is a New Zealand former rugby union footballer. Ralph began his first-class career with Bay of Plenty, then moved to Auckland before heading to Canterbury. He started his Super Rugby career with the Chiefs in 1997, Blues (1998–1999), Crusaders (2000–2008) and a cameo role with the Queensland Reds (2011). He made his All Black debut while playing for Auckland in 1998.

After an absence from the national team of three years he was recalled in 2001, and was a regular member of the All Blacks throughout the 2002 and 2003 seasons, playing a total of 13 tests and scoring eight tries, including a hat-trick against Italy in 2002, and was a member of the New Zealand team during the 2003 Rugby World Cup. In 2006 he gained his 100th consecutive super rugby cap.

He made the New Zealand sevens side while still at Western Heights High School, Rotorua. He has since regularly represented New Zealand in Rugby sevens between 1996 and 2000 playing with Eric Rush and was a member of the gold medal-winning New Zealand team at the 1998 Commonwealth Games.

Ralph is sixth on the all-time list of Super Rugby try scorers, five tries behind TJ Perenara, and he still holds the record for consecutive Super Rugby appearances with 104. Ralph won the Canterbury Maori Trophy on 10 December 2005. In 2008 he signed up to play with Japanese club Fukuoka Sanix Blues. In 2010 he signed with the Australian club Sunshine Coast Stingrays. The following year in the final round of the regular 2011 Super Rugby season, Queensland Reds coach Ewen McKenzie recruited Ralph on a short-term contract to combat the side's injury crisis in the outside backs. In Round 18 he took the field in the 65th minute as a substitute and equalled George Gregan's then-record of 136 Super Rugby games.

Awards
Preceded by Daryl Gibson	Tom French Memorial; Māori rugby union player of the year 2001	Succeeded by Carlos Spencer
