= Kees Meeuws =

New Zealand rugby union player

- Born: Kees Junior Meeuws; 26 July 1974 (age 52) Auckland, New Zealand
- Height: 184 cm (6 ft 1/2 in)
- Weight: 121 kg (19.1 st; 267 lb)
- School: Kelston Boys High School

Rugby union career
- Position: Prop
Senior career
Years	Team	Apps	(Points)
2004-2006	Castres	34	(45)
2006-2007	Agen	12	(0)
2007-2008	Castres	18	(5)
2008-2009	Scarlets	12	(5)
Provincial / State sides
Years	Team	Apps	(Points)
1996	Auckland	3	
1997–2001	Otago	40	
2002–2004	Auckland	16	
2009–2011	Otago	31	(10)
Super Rugby
Years	Team	Apps	(Points)
1997–2001	Highlanders	47	
2002–2004	Blues	33	
International career
Years	Team	Apps	(Points)
1998–2004	New Zealand	42	(50)

Kees Junior Meeuws (/ˈkeɪs ˈmjuːz/; born 26 July 1974) is a New Zealand former rugby union prop and former assistant coach of the Highlanders in the Super Rugby competition, and also a real estate agent by trade and a painter by education. Meeuws played 42 tests for the All Blacks between 1998 and 2004, scoring 10 test tries. He played provincial rugby for Otago and Auckland, and played for the Blues in the Super 12. In 2004, Meeuws left New Zealand to take up a contract with French club Castres Olympique, and in 2006 he left Castres for Agen after a falling-out with Castres coach Laurent Seigne. Following Agen's relegation after the 2006–07 season, Meeuws left Agen and returned to Castres, signing a two-year contract with the club. In May 2008, it was announced that Meeuws would be joining the Scarlets on a two-year deal. However, shortly into his Scarlets career, he suffered a long-term injury. In July 2009, having made just 12 appearances and scored 1 try, his contract with the Scarlets was cancelled by mutual consent. He returned to Otago in 2010 to play in the ITM Cup.

Meeuws was born in Auckland of Dutch and Māori parentage. He has written an autobiographical book about his experiences in France, Le Rugbyman (co-written with Heather Kidd), published in 2005.

Meeuws has a long-standing interest in art, and has exhibited his own work (created in collaboration with David Burke) in 2011 and 2015. He was also an alumnus of Elam School of Fine Arts as part of University of Auckland.

In 2020, he is in the alumni Match Fit squad to face New Zealand Barbarians. He revealed that he lost his mother at age 10, and his father at 20. He returned in season 2 in 2021/22 as the most powerful, strongest and most explosive player in the team.
