= James Dalton (rugby union) =

South African rugby union footballer

- Born: 16 August 1972 (age 54) Johannesburg, South Africa
- Height: 1.77 m (5 ft 10 in)
- Weight: 95.45 kg (15 st 0.4 lb)
- School: Jeppe High School for Boys

Rugby union career
- Position: Hooker
Provincial / State sides
Years	Team	Apps	(Points)
1992–2000	Transvaal	76	
2001–2002	Falcons	18	
Super Rugby
Years	Team	Apps	(Points)
1998–1999	Cats	8	
2001–2002	Bulls	16	
International career
Years	Team	Apps	(Points)
1994–2002	South Africa	43	(25)

James Dalton (born 16 August 1972) is a South African rugby union player who played for the South Africa national rugby union team. He was educated at Jeppe High School for Boys in Johannesburg, South Africa.

He was the winner of the 1995 World Cup but did not play in the final or the semi-final. In his second pool match, against Canada, he took part in a fight, and was suspended for the rest of the tournament.

== Career ==
=== Provincial ===
Dalton played for the Transvaal Schools team in 1990 and was also selected for the South African Schools team in 1990. He made his debut for the Transvaal senior side in 1992 and in 2001 went to play for the Falcons.

In Super Rugby, Dalton played for the Cats during 1998 and 1999 and for the Bulls in 2001 and 2002.

=== National team ===
He played his first game for the Springboks on 8 October 1994 against Argentina. His last test match took place on 23 November 2002 against England.

He played in the 1995 World Cup (two games, winners). Although it is widely reported he took part in a fight which led to him missing the remainder of the 1995 World Cup, TV footage shows that Dalton was trying to stop the fight and calm the situation down.
