= Dave Hewett =

New Zealand rugby player (born 1971)

- Born: David Norman Hewett; 14 July 1971 (age 55) Christchurch, New Zealand
- Height: 1.91 m (6 ft 3 in)
- Weight: 116 kg (256 lb)
- School: Christchurch Boys' High School
- Notable relative: Jason Hewett (cousin)

Rugby union career
- Position: Prop
Amateur team(s)
Years	Team	Apps	(Points)
- Sydenham
Senior career
Years	Team	Apps	(Points)
2004–2005	Scarlets	3	(0)
2005–2007	Edinburgh	17	(0)
Provincial / State sides
Years	Team	Apps	(Points)
1998–2005	Canterbury	51	(0)
Super Rugby
Years	Team	Apps	(Points)
1999–2005	Crusaders	71	(15)
International career
Years	Team	Apps	(Points)
2001–2003	New Zealand	22	(10)

David Norman Hewett (born 14 July 1971) is a New Zealand rugby union coach and former player. During his playing career, he played as a prop for Canterbury, the Crusaders, the Scarlets and Edinburgh.

== Rugby union career ==
=== Player ===
He played for the Crusaders in Super Rugby and for Canterbury in the Air New Zealand Cup. He made his debut for the All Blacks at the age of 30 in November 2001 against Ireland and won 22 full caps for the national team scoring two tries. Hewett signed a short-term deal with the Welsh regional team the Llanelli Scarlets in November 2004, playing three times before returning to New Zealand at the end of January. He was expected to return to the Scarlets for the 2005–06 season, having agreed a two-year contract, but he ended up signing a similar deal with Edinburgh in March 2005. He played for the Scottish team until 2007, his last year as professional.

=== Coach ===
From 2007 to 2016, Hewett worked in coaching roles for the Canterbury Crusaders. He has also coached for NZ Secondary Schools, NZ U20 and USA Eagles. He was appointed as coach for the Southland Stags for 2018 and 2019.

== Business career ==
Hewett bought building company Bainbridge Homes in 2014. The firm became insolvent in 2020. In March 2024, shareholders resolved to put the business into liquidation.
