= Richard Hill (rugby union, born 1973) =

British Lions & England international rugby union player

Richard Hill MBE
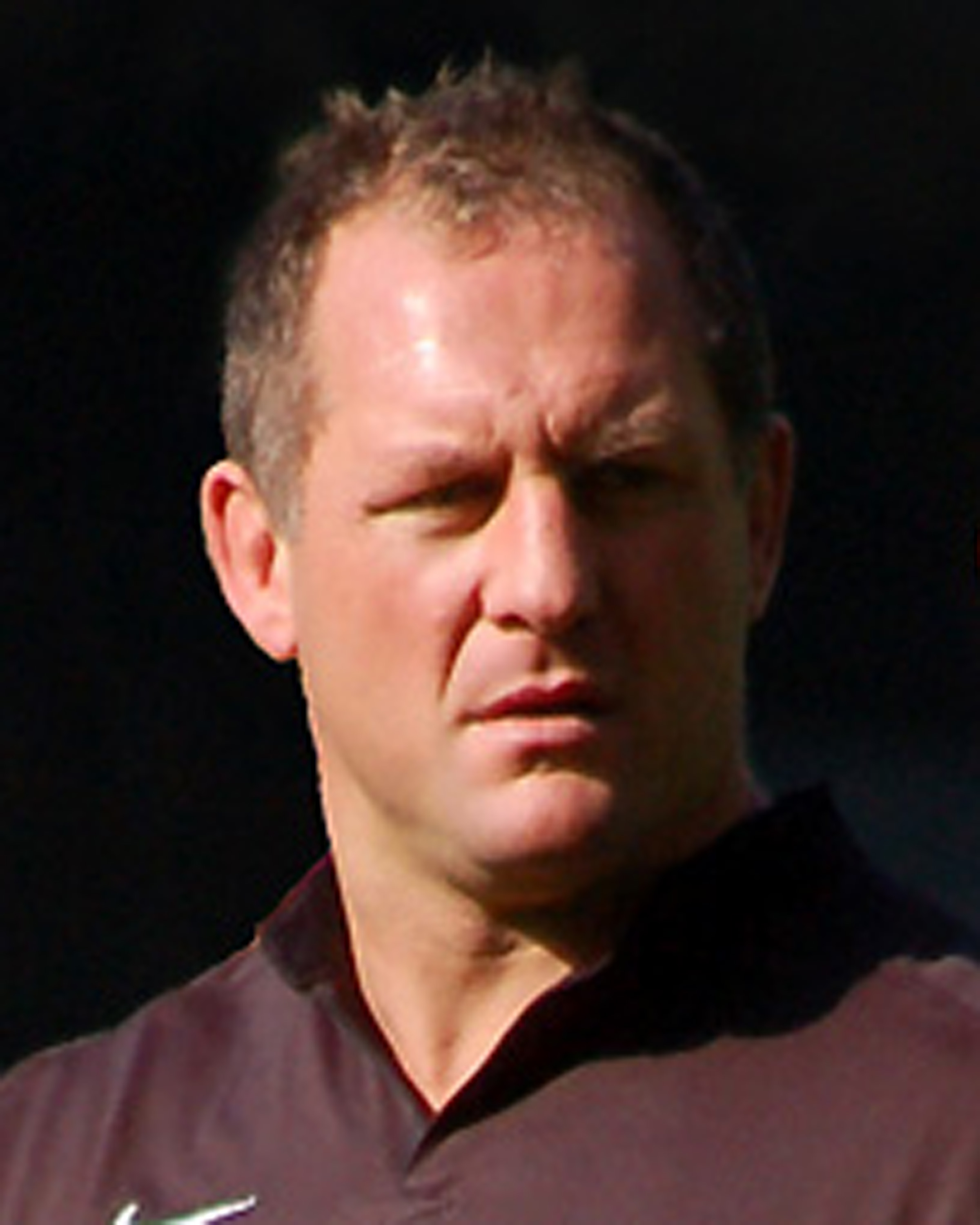
- Hill in 2010
- Born: Richard Anthony Hill MBE; 23 May 1973 (age 53) Dormansland, Surrey, England
- Height: 6 ft 2 in (1.88 m)
- Weight: 17 st 0 lb (108 kg)
- School: Bishop Wordsworths School
- University: West London Institute (now Brunel University)

Rugby union career
- Position: Flanker
Amateur team(s)
Years	Team	Apps	(Points)
1989–1993	Salisbury		
- Correct as of 7 November 2007
Senior career
Years	Team	Apps	(Points)
1993–2008	Saracens	275	((+110))
- Correct as of 7 November 2007
International career
Years	Team	Apps	(Points)
1997–2008	England	71	(60)
1997–2005	British & Irish Lions	5	(0)
- Correct as of 7 November 2007

Richard Anthony Hill MBE (born 23 May 1973) is a former rugby union footballer who played as a flanker for Saracens and England.

He won 71 caps for England, and 5 for the British, later British & Irish, Lions. He was part of the England team that won the 2003 Rugby World Cup.

He has a namesake, Richard John Hill, who played for England at scrum half between 1984 and 1992.

== Early life ==
Hill was born on 23 May 1973 in Dormansland, Surrey.

On his mother's side, he is a second cousin removed of film director Peter Jackson (Richard Hill's maternal grandmother and Peter Jackson's mother are first cousins both by father's side). His nephew is left back, Ben Purrington.

Hill attended Bishop Wordsworth's Grammar School in Salisbury, and gained early prominence as a schools international. It is coincidental that his namesake, who coaches Bristol, had also attended the same school and both played for Salisbury Rugby Club. Hill graduated from the West London Institute of Higher Education in Sports Science and Geography, in 1995. He also won the IB Mac prize in recognition of his combined academic and athletic achievements. On 16 July 2002, Brunel University conferred upon Hill the honorary degree of Master of the University.

== Playing career ==
=== Early years ===
He made his first Saracens appearance in 1993.

Hill made his England debut in the 1997 Five Nations Championship against Scotland, playing at openside flanker. He was selected ahead of Neil Back, who was controversially ignored by the England team for that period. He toured South Africa with the British Lions in the summer of 1997, gaining two caps.

He missed Saracens' Tetley's Bitter Cup victory in 1998 with a back injury.

Under new coach Clive Woodward, Hill was initially selected at openside, but was moved to blindside flanker to accommodate Neil Back on the openside flank, with Lawrence Dallaglio moving from blindside to number eight. It was in this combination of players that Hill gained most of his caps.

=== 2001 Lions ===
In the 2001 British & Irish Lions tour to Australia Hill played in the 1st and 2nd tests until concussed in a collision with Nathan Grey.

=== 2003 Rugby World Cup ===
Although Hill had been named in England's 2003 Rugby World Cup squad, his place appeared in jeopardy after he suffered a hamstring strain on the eve of the tournament. Coach Clive Woodward decided that it was worth the risk to keep Hill in the team.

Hill missed the pool games, and days out from England's quarterfinal clash with Wales, scans on the injured hamstring initially revealed grim prospects, but Hill was encouraged by the team physios that it was still possible to recover in time for the semi-final.

England saw off a brave challenge from Wales in the quarterfinal to advance to the semi-finals. Hill was named in the starting line up for the semi-final against France. England easily coped with the much-vaunted French back-row. Hill played a key role in helping England defeat Australia in the final.

=== Later years ===
After Neil Back's retirement in 2003, Hill switched back to the openside flanker role. He is the only player never to have been dropped during Clive Woodward's England tenure. He played for Saracens and was selected for the England Saxons (A-Team) squad for the 2007 internationals.

Hill injured the anterior cruciate ligament in his left knee in a match against London Irish on 3 October 2004, and underwent surgery three days later. He was out for the following seven months, but returned to be named in a Lions touring squad for the third time in 2005. He was named in the starting fifteen for the first Lions Test against the All Blacks, but suffered a knee injury during the first half, ending his tour.

In January 2008 Hill announced that he would retire at the end of that Premiership season, due to the toll taken upon his knee since his two injuries, which had left him with a permanent limp. However, in April 2008, his man-of-the-match performance in the Heineken Cup victory over Ospreys confirmed his continued ability to perform at the highest level.

On 11 May 2008, Hill played his final game for Saracens, who won 25–20 against Bristol. On 20 September 2008, Hill appeared for the Help for Heroes XV in a charity match against Scott Gibbs' International XV at Twickenham Stadium to raise funds for injured servicemen and women. He scored a try in the Heroes' 29–10 win.

== Activities after playing career ==
In 2019, Hill was appointed Team Manager of the England rugby team, having previously served in a similar role with the England Saxons.
