= 2005 New Zealand rugby union tour of Britain and Ireland =

Grand Slam rugby union tour

- Coach: Graham Henry
- Top point scorer: Dan Carter (39)
- Top try scorer: Rico Gear (5)
Summary
| P | W | D | L |
Total
| 4 | 4 | 0 | 0 |
Opponent
| P | W | D | L |
Wales
| 1 | 1 | 0 | 0 |
Ireland
| 1 | 1 | 0 | 0 |
England
| 1 | 1 | 0 | 0 |
Scotland
| 1 | 1 | 0 | 0 |

The 2005 New Zealand rugby union tour of Britain and Ireland was a Grand Slam rugby union tour played by the New Zealand national team (the All Blacks) in the United Kingdom and the Republic of Ireland as part of the 2005 end-of-year rugby union tests. Played through November, it consisted of 4 matches against Wales, Ireland, England and Scotland.

It was the first Grand Slam tour by the All Blacks since the 18-match tour of 1978.

New Zealand won all of their matches with a touring squad of 35 players selected by Head Coach Graham Henry.

The matches were played during November 2005. The first match was against Wales on the 5th, the second was against Ireland on the 12th, the third was against England on the 19th, and the last match was against Scotland on the 26th to complete the first successful Grand Slam tour of the professional era. The last successful Grand Slam was by Australia in 1984 in between 14 other matches.

== Touring squad ==
A total of 35 players were selected for the touring squad: five props, three hookers, four locks, seven loose forwards, three halfbacks, seven midfielders and six back three-quarters, including five new caps. Graham Henry was Head Coach with Wayne Smith and Steve Hansen as his assistant coaches. Tana Umaga was named captain for the tour.

2005 New Zealand Grand Slam touring squad
| Props: John Afoa; Carl Hayman; Saimone Taumoepeau; Neemia Tialata^{1}; Tony Woodcock; Hookers: Andrew Hore; Keven Mealamu; Anton Oliver; Locks: Jason Eaton^{1}; Chris Jack; James Ryan; Ali Williams | Loose forwards: Jerry Collins; Sione Lauaki; Angus MacDonald^{1}; Chris Masoe^{1}; Richie McCaw; Rodney So'oialo; Mose Tuiali'i; Halfbacks: Jimmy Cowan; Byron Kelleher; Piri Weepu | Midfielders: Dan Carter; Nick Evans; Aaron Mauger; Ma'a Nonu; Conrad Smith; Isaia Toeava^{1}; Tana Umaga (c); Back three-quarters: Rico Gear; Doug Howlett; Leon MacDonald; Mils Muliaina; Joe Rokocoko; Sitiveni Sivivatu | Coaches: Graham Henry (head); Wayne Smith (asst.); Steve Hansen (asst.); – Most players are capable of playing multiple positions. – Squad only include players who have been named in a starting 15 or reserves bench. – (c) = Captain – ^{1} = New cap |

== Tests ==
A total of four matches were played during the 2005 Grand Slam tour against the four home unions of Wales, Ireland, England and Scotland. The tour was played over four weeks, with one game each week.

| Date | Opponent | Score | Venue | Attendance |
|---|---|---|---|---|
| 5 Nov | Wales | **41**–3 | Millennium Stadium, Cardiff | 74,402 |
| 12 Nov | Ireland | **45**–7 | Lansdowne Road, Dublin | 42,000 |
| 19 Nov | England | **23**–19 | Twickenham, London | 62,000 |
| 26 Nov | Scotland | **29**–10 | Murrayfield, Edinburgh | 47,678 |
New Zealand scores in bold

=== Wales ===
Wales were looking to beat the All Blacks for the first time since 1953, when they won 13–8 at Cardiff Arms Park. They came into the match and tour as the most recent Six Nations champions and the last of the Home Nations to agree to play the All Blacks on the 2005 tour. New Zealand came in after a successful British & Irish Lions tour and another Tri Nations win.

The All Black coaching staff named three debutants for the first test in Cardiff: Neemia Tialata and Chris Masoe were chosen ahead of regular starters Tony Woodcock and Richie McCaw, while Angus MacDonald came on for James Ryan for his first international.

5 November 2005

| **Wales** | **3–41** | **New Zealand** |
| Pen: S. Jones 19' | Report | Try: Gear (3) 28' c, 43' c, 48' c Carter (2) 66' c, 78' c Con: Carter (5); Pen: Carter (2) 10', 16' |

Millennium Stadium, Cardiff
Attendance: 74,402
Referee: Chris White (England)

| FB | 15 | Gareth Thomas (c) | (substituted off) 56' |
| RW | 14 | Kevin Morgan |
| OC | 13 | Mark Taylor |
| IC | 12 | Ceri Sweeney | (substituted off) 68' |
| LW | 11 | Shane Williams |
| FH | 10 | Stephen Jones |
| SH | 9 | Mike Phillips | (substituted off) 49' |
| N8 | 8 | Michael Owen |
| OF | 7 | Colin Charvis | (substituted off) 68' |
| BF | 6 | Jonathan Thomas |
| RL | 5 | Robert Sidoli |
| LL | 4 | Brent Cockbain | (substituted off) 61' |
| TP | 3 | Adam Jones | (substituted off) 46' |
| HK | 2 | Mefin Davies | (substituted off) 61' |
| LP | 1 | Duncan Jones |
Replacements:
| HK | 16 | T. Rhys Thomas | (substituted on) 61' |
| PR | 17 | Chris Horsman | (substituted on) 46' |
| LK | 18 | Luke Charteris | (substituted on) 61' |
| FL | 19 | Robin Sowden-Taylor | (substituted on) 68' |
| SH | 20 | Gareth Cooper | (substituted on) 49' |
| FH | 21 | Nicky Robinson | (substituted on) 68' |
| WG | 22 | Lee Byrne | (substituted on) 56' |
Coach:
(Wales) Mike Ruddock

| FB | 15 | Mils Muliaina | (substituted on) 72' |
| RW | 14 | Rico Gear | (substituted on) 68' |
| OC | 13 | Conrad Smith |
| IC | 12 | Tana Umaga (c) |
| LW | 11 | Joe Rokocoko |
| FH | 10 | Dan Carter |
| SH | 9 | Byron Kelleher | (substituted on) 68' |
| N8 | 8 | Rodney So'oialo |
| OF | 7 | Chris Masoe | (substituted on) 68' |
| BF | 6 | Jerry Collins |
| RL | 5 | James Ryan | (substituted on) 65' |
| LL | 4 | Chris Jack |
| TP | 3 | Carl Hayman |
| HK | 2 | Anton Oliver | (substituted on) 65' |
| LP | 1 | Neemia Tialata | (substituted on) 51' |
Replacements:
| HK | 16 | Andrew Hore | (substituted on) 65' |
| PR | 17 | Tony Woodcock | (substituted on) 51' |
| LK | 18 | Angus Macdonald | (substituted on) 65' |
| FL | 19 | Richie McCaw | (substituted on) 68' |
| SH | 20 | Jimmy Cowan | (substituted on) 68' |
| CE | 21 | Ma'a Nonu | (substituted on) 68' |
| FB | 22 | Leon MacDonald | (substituted on) 72' |
Coach:
(New Zealand) Graham Henry

Key
(substituted off) (substituted on) Substitution
Blood bin
Yellow card
(red card) Red card

==== Match summary ====
The All Blacks started off their tour with a 41–3 victory over Wales in Cardiff on 5 November, the 100th anniversary of rugby between the two teams. Dan Carter scored 26 points for New Zealand, including two of the five tries by the visitors. Rico Gear scored the other three tries for his team.

===== First half =====
The All Blacks took control of the ball and position on the field, to deter the chance of the Welsh team's offensive attack.

New Zealand struck first with an early penalty before Byron Kelleher lost the first chance for a try in the 16th minute of play. The halfback took a quick tap at halfway, running 45 meters through a gap before getting tackled downfield, failing to offload to the open Tana Umaga at his shoulder. Carter converted to be two from two and put the All Blacks out in front 6–0.

Wales also missed a chance for a try that had to be substituted for penalty because of poor play. Gareth Thomas made it happen with a break through a missed tackle to set up a ruck inside the All Blacks' 22-meter line. A penalty was called for poor ball handling. First-five Stephen Jones converted it into points and decreased the deficit to a penalty's-worth, 3 points.

Rico Gear scored the only try of the first half. With the scores at 6–3 in favor of the visitors, Chris Jack took the ball from the line-out in Welsh territory and provided the ball to the backs. Umaga straightened and feed back to Carter who spread it to Mils Muliaina. He then passed to Gear who scored in the right hand corner. Carter converted the sideline conversion and put the All Blacks out to 13.

The Rico Gear try in the corner nine minutes from the half-time break gave the All Blacks the upper hand going into the second half.

===== Second half =====
The All Blacks scored two converted tries in the first ten minutes, both from Gear. Gear scored his second, set up by Carter, and third in the same corner as his first; his second came from a pass from Carter who put him through the gap and it was an easy run to the try line, while his third was as simple as his first two with some easy passing out wide where Gear got outside his man and scored another five-pointer. Carter converted and New Zealand secured the win with still half an hour to play with a 27–3 lead.

Both sides shifted down a few gears dominating much of the final half-hour.New Zealand scored their fourth try of the game, coming from a play by Carter who broke a tackle and ran down the line to score his 17th and, after the conversion, 19th points of the match. In the final minute of play Conrad Smith put a kick through for Umaga; Umaga ran to catch the ball, but went down with his challenger and popped the ball up to a supporting Carter who went in for his second try and then his fifth conversion of the night.

Carter finished with 26 of the team's 41 points and the All Blacks started off their tour on the highest possible note.

Both teams used all of their replacement players, bringing them on at some point during the match. Richie McCaw and Tony Woodcock were the two usual starters on the bench making room for run-on debutants Neemia Tialata and Chris Masoe, while Angus MacDonald made his debut off the bench.

=== Ireland ===
Ireland were looking for a historic first win over the All Blacks. Throughout the entirety of their test rugby back catalogue, Ireland had failed to register a single victory. The closest they had come was a 10–10 draw in 1973 at Lansdowne Road.

The All Black coaches named a completely different squad than their team that played against Wales with loose forward Sione Lauaki and prop John Afoa making their debuts. Afoa was selected in the initial squad for the Tri Nations earlier in the year but had to wait until the 2005 end-of-year tour be he got on the field. Richie McCaw was named captain while regular captain Tana Umaga was rested. They also named five forward replacements and only two back replacements.

12 November 2005

| **Ireland** | **7–45** | **New Zealand** |
| Try: Horan; Con: Humphreys | Report | Try: Sivivatu (2); Weepu; Howlett (2); Con: Evans (4); Pen: Evans (4) |

Lansdowne Road, Dublin
Attendance: 42,000
Referee: Jonathan Kaplan (South Africa)

| FB | 15 | Geordan Murphy | (substituted off) 76' |
| RW | 14 | Tommy Bowe |
| OC | 13 | Gordon D'Arcy |
| IC | 12 | Shane Horgan |
| LW | 11 | Anthony Horgan |
| FH | 10 | Ronan O'Gara | (substituted off) 71' |
| SH | 9 | Peter Stringer |
| N8 | 8 | Denis Leamy |
| OF | 7 | Johnny O'Connor |
| BF | 6 | Simon Easterby (c) | (substituted off) 70' |
| RL | 5 | Malcolm O'Kelly | (substituted off) 60' |
| LL | 4 | Donncha O'Callaghan |
| TP | 3 | John Hayes | (substituted off) 60' |
| HK | 2 | Shane Byrne | (substituted off) 70' |
| LP | 1 | Marcus Horan |
Replacements:
| HK | 16 | Rory Best | (substituted on) 70' |
| PR | 17 | Simon Best | (substituted on) 60' |
| LK | 18 | Matt McCullough | (substituted on) 60' |
| FL | 19 | Neil Best | (substituted on) 70' |
| SH | 20 | Kieran Campbell |
| FH | 21 | David Humphreys | (substituted on) 76' |
| FB | 22 | Girvan Dempsey | (substituted on) 76' |
Coach:
(Ireland) Eddie O'Sullivan

| FB | 15 | Leon MacDonald |
| RW | 14 | Doug Howlett |
| OC | 13 | Ma'a Nonu |
| IC | 12 | Aaron Mauger |
| LW | 11 | Sitiveni Sivivatu |
| FH | 10 | Nick Evans |
| SH | 9 | Piri Weepu | (substituted off) 60' |
| N8 | 8 | Mose Tuiali'i |
| OF | 7 | Richie McCaw (c) | (substituted off) 70' |
| BF | 6 | Sione Lauaki |
| RL | 5 | Ali Williams |
| LL | 4 | Jason Eaton |
| TP | 3 | John Afoa |
| HK | 2 | Keven Mealamu | (substituted off) 60' |
| LP | 1 | Tony Woodcock | (substituted off) 60' |
Replacements:
| HK | 16 | Andrew Hore | (substituted on) 60' |
| PR | 17 | Saimone Taumoepeau | (substituted on) 60' |
| PR | 18 | Carl Hayman |
| LK | 19 | Chris Jack |
| N8 | 20 | Rodney So'oialo | (substituted on) 70' |
| SH | 21 | Jimmy Cowan | (substituted on) 60' |
| FB | 22 | Mils Muliaina |
Coach:
(New Zealand) Graham Henry

Key
(substituted off) (substituted on) Substitution
Blood bin
Yellow card
(red card) Red card

==== Match summary ====
The All Blacks' second test was as good as their first with good win over Ireland on 12 November. The score would have been a shutout, but a late try by Marcus Horan left the full-time score at 45–7. Two tries each to wingers Sitiveni Sivivatu and Doug Howlett and another 20 points contributed by Nick Evans helped the All Blacks to a perfect 2–0 start to their Grand Slam tour.

===== First half =====
Ireland struggled in the first ten minutes, unable to get out of their own half from the pressure the All Blacks applied. The result was inevitable as Sitiveni Sivivatu broke a tackle and scored the first try of the match in the ninth minute of play. Nick Evans converted and the All Blacks were up 7–0.

As possession switched between teams, New Zealand were the first to do something with it when stand-in captain Richie McCaw offloaded to busy halfback Piri Weepu for their second try. Evans missed the conversion, but a penalty five minutes later brought the All Blacks up to 15–0 26 minutes in.

With another penalty in the 35th minute, New Zealand gained a chance at a counter-attack off a kick from Ronan O'Gara that failed to clear the touchline. New Zealand soaked up the Irish pressure and gained possession, No. 8 Mose Tuiali'i broke down the right hand line, passed to Leon MacDonald who fed Sivivatu for his second and New Zealand's third. Evans converted and New Zealand went into half-time with a 25–0 advantage.

===== Second half =====
New Zealand started where they finished off in the second half with Ireland trying to perform better than their poor first half when Nick Evans kicked two penalties in the first eight minutes from some disappointing play from the home side.

A dangerous tackle by Ma'a Nonu on Gordon D'Arcy brought memories of the Tana Umaga "spear tackle" on Brian O'Driscoll in the 2005 British & Irish Lions tour and he was lucky to leave with just a warning.

Five minutes after the tackle, winger Doug Howlett got the wide ball and scored what looked like New Zealand's fourth try of the night, but referee Jonathan Kaplan referred to the television match official and awarded Ireland a line-out instead, after it was determined his leg was out of bounds before the ball was grounded in goal. Ma'a Nonu was also called back after he knocked the ball on over the line. Howlett gained what he thought he had five minutes later with the first of his tries as the All Blacks spread it wide beyond Ireland's capacity, Evans converted and New Zealand were up 28–0.

Ten minutes from full-time Ireland took a quick tap and Shane Horgan scrambled over the line but was unable to ground the ball and they were awarded a penalty five metres out. Four minutes later, when the game was all but over, Howlett prospered from another period of prolonged New Zealand pressure and claimed his second try of the afternoon. Another conversion followed, and New Zealand were up by 45 points.

Ireland finally got on the board two minutes from full-time when Marcus Horan crossed the line from an Irish maul. David Humphreys converted, and the Irish left without the embarrassment of a whitewash.

New Zealand finished the game with a dominant performance, not letting Ireland in until the last minute, racking up their second win of the tour and halfway to their first Grand Slam tour since 1978.

New Zealand used four of their possible seven substitutes, with Saimone Taumoepeau coming on to have his first run-out of the tour. Ireland used six of their subs during the game, with only Kieran Campbell not being used.

=== England ===
England provided the toughest challenge yet with only four points separating the teams at the final whistle. England were the most recent team of the four 2005 opponents to beat the All Blacks with a 15–13 victory in 2003 at Westpac Stadium in Wellington.

New Zealand named the best team possible for the game with only seven of the players staying on from the last test against Ireland. Richie McCaw was a late replacement after copping a head knock in the previous test, he was replaced by Chris Masoe. It was marked and remembered by the three yellow cards referee Alan Lewis delivered to the All Blacks, who at one time were down to 13 men.

Along with Wales, England were celebrating 100 years of test rugby against the All Blacks, first playing on 12 February 1905.

19 November 2005

| **England** | **19–23** | **New Zealand** |
| Try: Corry; Con: Hodgson; Pen: Hodgson (4) | Report | Try: Mealamu; Umaga; Con: Carter (2); Pen: Carter (3) |

Twickenham Stadium, London
Attendance: 62,000
Referee: Alan Lewis (Ireland)

| FB | 15 | Josh Lewsey |
| RW | 14 | Mark Cueto |
| OC | 13 | Jamie Noon |
| IC | 12 | Mike Tindall |
| LW | 11 | Ben Cohen |
| FH | 10 | Charlie Hodgson |
| SH | 9 | Matt Dawson |
| N8 | 8 | Martin Corry (c) |
| OF | 7 | Lewis Moody |
| BF | 6 | Pat Sanderson |
| RL | 5 | Danny Grewcock |
| LL | 4 | Steve Borthwick |
| TP | 3 | Phil Vickery |
| HK | 2 | Steve Thompson |
| LP | 1 | Andrew Sheridan | (substituted off) 74' |
Replacements:
| HK | 16 | Lee Mears |
| PR | 17 | Matt Stevens | (substituted on) 74' |
| LK | 18 | Louis Deacon |
| FL | 19 | Chris Jones |
| SH | 20 | Harry Ellis |
| FH | 21 | Olly Barkley |
| FB | 22 | Mark van Gisbergen |
Coach:
(England) Andy Robinson

| FB | 15 | Mils Muliaina |
| RW | 14 | Doug Howlett |
| OC | 13 | Tana Umaga (c) |
| IC | 12 | Aaron Mauger | | (substituted off) 77' |
| LW | 11 | Sitiveni Sivivatu | | (substituted off) 74' |
| FH | 10 | Dan Carter |
| SH | 9 | Byron Kelleher | | (substituted off) 73' |
| N8 | 8 | Rodney So'oialo | | (substituted off) 76' |
| OF | 7 | Chris Masoe | (yellow card) 77' |
| BF | 6 | Jerry Collins |
| RL | 5 | Ali Williams | | 64' to 67' |
| LL | 4 | Chris Jack |
| TP | 3 | Carl Hayman |
| HK | 2 | Keven Mealamu |
| LP | 1 | Tony Woodcock | (yellow card) 57' |
Replacements:
| HK | 16 | Andrew Hore |
| PR | 17 | Neemia Tialata | (yellow card) 66' |
| LK | 18 | Jason Eaton | | (substituted on) 64' | (substituted off) 67' |
| FL | 19 | Mose Tuiali'i | | (substituted on) 76' |
| SH | 20 | Piri Weepu | | (substituted on) 73' |
| WG | 21 | Joe Rokocoko | | (substituted on) 74' |
| FB | 22 | Leon MacDonald | | (substituted on) 77' |
Coach:
(New Zealand) Graham Henry

Key
(substituted off) (substituted on) Substitution
Blood bin
Yellow card
(red card) Red card

==== Match summary ====
Staunch defence was a major factor in New Zealand's 23–19 win over England on 19 November in front of capacity crowd at a Twickenham Stadium going through a few developments. With 14 men for the better part of the second half, New Zealand kept the home team to just one try, running in two of their own and a total of 10 successful kicks at goal completing the scoring.

===== First half =====
England dominated the early stages of the game, captain Martin Corry running in the first try five minutes in. New Zealand were penalised in their desperation to recover, and England opted for the line-out which got them to the All Blacks' 22-metre line. They completed the line-out and from the ensuing maul the home team scored their first and only try of the match. Charlie Hodgson converted the sideline conversion and the Twickenham crowd settled down to see how the All Blacks would respond.

As the two teams battled for supremacy in all areas it took five-eight Dan Carter to make the break. Through a weak tackle by Corry on his own 22-metre line, Carter had a two-on-one. He managed to offload to his captain, Tana Umaga, who scored under the posts. Carter converted and the scores were equal 20 minutes in.

After some tremendous defence from both teams, a penalty goal each saw the score move to 10–10 in which was an intensely fought battle, evident in the scrums where England, dominant in their match against Australia a week ago, were being given a much tougher test.

Another penalty by Carter after one missed by Hodgson left the All Blacks with a 13–10 advantage going into halftime after a tough, fast first half.

===== Second half =====
New Zealand were immediately on the front foot five minutes after the restart with Dan Carter making another break which set up a platform for Keven Mealamu to barrel over. With the conversion successful, New Zealand were out to a 10-point lead early on.

Another penalty each, and the score at 23–13, England sustained enough forward pressure to force Tony Woodcock to commit a yellow card offence in the 57th minute. England responded successfully with two penalties to Hodgson from some nice line-out and driving work by the forwards. The lead was knocked down to four points with a quarter of an hour left in the match with New Zealand still with 14 men.

A couple of minutes before Woodcock was due to return, the replacement prop, Neemia Tialata, was sin-binned and, for a short while, New Zealand were down to 13 men.

England were still unable to score any points though and with both sin-binned players returning, it looked like the All Blacks would be able to hold out for the last four minutes. However, with England threatening on attack, Chris Masoe was penalised for intentionally killing the ball and was shown the yellow card, giving the home team a shot at the win.

Despite the player advantage, England could not create the opportunity to score the try needed for the victory, and New Zealand escaped with their toughest win of the tour.

New Zealand received three yellow cards throughout the game, and were reduced to 13 men at one point. They also utilised all of their replacements except Andrew Hore. England only used one of their seven substitutes, with Matt Stevens coming on for Andrew Sheridan in the 74th minute.

=== Scotland ===
26 November 2005

| **Scotland** | **10–29** | **New Zealand** |
| Try: Webster; Con: Paterson; Pen: Paterson | Report | Try: Gear (2); Evans; Lauaki; Con: Evans (2); MacDonald; Pen: Evans |

Murrayfield Stadium, Edinburgh
Attendance: 47,678
Referee: Nigel Whitehouse (Wales)

| FB | 15 | Hugo Southwell |
| RW | 14 | Chris Paterson |
| OC | 13 | Marcus Di Rollo | (substituted off) 57' |
| IC | 12 | Andrew Henderson |
| LW | 11 | Sean Lamont |
| FH | 10 | Dan Parks | (substituted off) 68' |
| SH | 9 | Chris Cusiter | (substituted off) 20' |
| N8 | 8 | Simon Taylor |
| OF | 7 | Ally Hogg | (substituted off) 68' |
| BF | 6 | Jason White |
| RL | 5 | Scott Murray |
| LL | 4 | Craig Hamilton | (substituted off) 40' |
| TP | 3 | Bruce Douglas | (substituted off) 59' |
| HK | 2 | Scott Lawson | (substituted off) 59' |
| LP | 1 | Gavin Kerr |
Replacements:
| HK | 16 | Dougie Hall | (substituted on) 59' |
| PR | 17 | Craig Smith | (substituted on) 59' |
| LK | 18 | Alastair Kellock | (substituted on) 40' |
| FL | 19 | Kelly Brown | (substituted on) 68' |
| SH | 20 | Mike Blair | (substituted on) 20' |
| FH | 21 | Phil Godman | (substituted on) 68' |
| CE | 22 | Simon Webster | (substituted on) 57' |
Coach:
(Scotland) Frank Hadden

| FB | 15 | Isaia Toeava |
| RW | 14 | Rico Gear |
| OC | 13 | Conrad Smith | (substituted off) 40' |
| IC | 12 | Tana Umaga (c) |
| LW | 11 | Joe Rokocoko |
| FH | 10 | Nick Evans | (substituted off) 70' |
| SH | 9 | Piri Weepu | (substituted off) 64' |
| N8 | 8 | Sione Lauaki |
| OF | 7 | Richie McCaw | (substituted off) 45' |
| BF | 6 | Angus Macdonald |
| RL | 5 | James Ryan | (substituted off) 64' |
| LL | 4 | Chris Jack |
| TP | 3 | John Afoa |
| HK | 2 | Anton Oliver | (substituted off) 48' |
| LP | 1 | Saimone Taumoepeau | (substituted off) 69' |
Replacements:
| HK | 16 | Andrew Hore | (substituted on) 48' |
| PR | 17 | Neemia Tialata | (substituted on) 69' |
| LK | 18 | Jason Eaton | (substituted on) 64' |
| FL | 19 | Mose Tuiali'i | (substituted on) 45' |
| SH | 20 | Jimmy Cowan | (substituted on) 64' |
| FH | 21 | Leon MacDonald | (substituted on) 70' |
| CE | 22 | Ma'a Nonu | (substituted on) 40' |
Coach:
(New Zealand) Graham Henry

Key
(substituted off) (substituted on) Substitution
Blood bin
Yellow card
(red card) Red card
