= Umaga =

Umaga may refer to:

- Jack Umaga (b. 1984), New Zealand-born Romanian rugby union player
- Mike Umaga (b. 1966), New Zealand-born Samoan rugby union player
- Tana Umaga (b. 1973), New Zealand rugby union player
- Umaga (wrestler) (1973–2009), Samoan-American wrestler
- Peter Umaga-Jensen (b. 1997), New Zealand rugby union player
- Parish of Umaga, a low level cadastral unit in the Torres Strait Islands
