= 2005 British & Irish Lions tour to New Zealand =

Rugby union team tour

- The logo of the 2005 Lions tour
- Date: 23 May – 9 July
- Coach: (England) Clive Woodward
- Tour captain(s): (Ireland) Brian O'Driscoll (Wales) Gareth Thomas
- Test series winners: New Zealand (3–0)
- Top test point scorer: (Wales) Stephen Jones (14)
Summary
P	W	D	L
Total
11	7	0	4
Test match
3	0	0	3
Opponent
P	W	D	L
New Zealand
3	0	0	3

Tour chronology
- ← Australia 2001 South Africa 2009 →

In 2005, the British & Irish Lions rugby union team toured New Zealand for the first time since 1993, playing seven matches against first and second division teams from the National Provincial Championship, one match against the New Zealand Maori team, and three test matches against New Zealand (the All Blacks). The Lions lost the test series 3–0, the first time in 22 years that they lost every test match on tour.

The team was managed by former England and Lions player Bill Beaumont, coached by former England coach Sir Clive Woodward, and originally captained by Ireland captain Brian O'Driscoll. O'Driscoll suffered a controversial tour-ending injury two minutes into the first test, and Wales captain Gareth Thomas took over as captain for the final four games of the tour.

The poor test results of the 2005 Lions, despite having one of the most experienced playing squads and the largest management team of any Lions tour, led to criticism of Woodward, particularly his selection policy, and prompted commentators to question the future of the Lions.

This tour followed the Lions' 2001 tour to Australia and preceded the 2009 tour to South Africa.

== Schedule ==
The Lions' campaign involved a warm-up match against Argentina (which was retroactively awarded test status by the International Rugby Board in March 2008) before the departure for New Zealand, three tests against the All Blacks, and several tour matches, where the quality of the opposition was expected to be high. This proved to be the case against New Zealand Maori and Auckland, and most of the other tour matches were close for at least the first half. But the match against Manawatu (the Lions' only opponent from the second division of New Zealand's domestic league, the National Provincial Championship) was a one-sided affair, the Lions winning by a score of 109–6.

Date	Home team	Score	Away team	Venue		Result
23 May	British & Irish Lions	25–25	Argentina	Millennium Stadium, Cardiff	Match details	Draw
4 June	Bay of Plenty	20–34	British & Irish Lions	Rotorua International Stadium, Rotorua	Match details	Win
8 June	Taranaki	14–36	British & Irish Lions	Yarrow Stadium, New Plymouth	Match details	Win
11 June	New Zealand Maori	19–13	British & Irish Lions	Waikato Stadium, Hamilton	Match details	Loss
15 June	Wellington	6–23	British & Irish Lions	Wellington Regional Stadium, Wellington	Match details	Win
18 June	Otago	19–30	British & Irish Lions	Carisbrook, Dunedin	Match details	Win
21 June	Southland	16–26	British & Irish Lions	Rugby Park Stadium, Invercargill	Match details	Win
25 June	New Zealand	21–3	British & Irish Lions	Lancaster Park, Christchurch	Match details	Loss
28 June	Manawatu	6–109	British & Irish Lions	Arena Manawatu, Palmerston North	Match details	Win
2 July	New Zealand	48–18	British & Irish Lions	Wellington Regional Stadium, Wellington	Match details	Loss
5 July	Auckland	13–17	British & Irish Lions	Eden Park, Auckland	Match details	Win
9 July	New Zealand	38–19	British & Irish Lions	Eden Park, Auckland	Match details	Loss

== Lions Squad ==
The 44-man tour squad was announced on 11 April 2005, and included 20 players from England, 11 from Ireland, 10 from Wales and three from Scotland. Ireland's Brian O'Driscoll was named as captain. Among the English players selected were two who had retired from international rugby (Neil Back and Lawrence Dallaglio), and one who was returning from a long-term injury (Richard Hill).

Three players did not travel to New Zealand with the bulk of the touring party: Jason Robinson was excused from the first three tour matches to spend time with his pregnant wife; Stephen Jones and Gareth Thomas were forced to delay their departures due to commitments to their French clubs. Jones arrived in New Zealand on 31 May, before the Lions played their first tour match, while Robinson arrived on 7 June. For a time, it was doubtful whether Thomas would be able to contend for a spot in the first test, as he had not been released by his club, Toulouse. However, Toulouse lost in the Top 14 semi-finals, allowing Thomas to leave for New Zealand, also arriving on 7 June. Thomas later replaced O'Driscoll as tour captain after O'Driscoll suffered a dislocated shoulder in the first test. Michael Owen also briefly left the tour two weeks in to attend the birth of his second child.

Notes: Ages listed are as of the first tour match on 23 May. Bold denotes that the player was selected for a previous Lions squad.

Player	Position	Date of birth (age)	National team	Club/province	National caps (Lions tests)	Notes
Gordon Bulloch	Hooker		Scotland	Glasgow		
Shane Byrne	Hooker		Ireland	Leinster		
Steve Thompson	Hooker		England	Northampton Saints		
Andy Titterrell	Hooker		England	Sale Sharks		
John Hayes	Prop		Ireland	Munster		
Gethin Jenkins	Prop		Wales	Cardiff Blues		
Graham Rowntree	Prop		England	Leicester Tigers		
Andrew Sheridan	Prop		England	Sale Sharks		
Matt Stevens	Prop		England	Bath		
Julian White	Prop		England	Leicester Tigers		
Danny Grewcock	Lock		England	Bath		
Ben Kay	Lock		England	Leicester Tigers		
Donncha O'Callaghan	Lock		Ireland	Munster		
Paul O'Connell	Lock		Ireland	Munster		
Malcolm O'Kelly	Lock		Ireland	Leinster		
Neil Back	Back row		England	Leicester Tigers		
Martin Corry	Back row		England	Leicester Tigers		
Lawrence Dallaglio	Back row		England	London Wasps		
Richard Hill	Back row		England	Saracens		
Lewis Moody	Back row		England	Leicester Tigers		
Michael Owen	Back row		Wales	Newport Gwent Dragons		
Simon Taylor	Back row		Scotland	Edinburgh		
Martyn Williams	Back row		Wales	Cardiff Blues		
Gareth Cooper	Scrum-half		Wales	Newport Gwent Dragons		
Chris Cusiter	Scrum-half		Scotland	Border Reivers		
Matt Dawson	Scrum-half		England	London Wasps		
Dwayne Peel	Scrum-half		Wales	Llanelli Scarlets		
Charlie Hodgson	Fly-half		England	Sale Sharks		
Stephen Jones	Fly-half		Wales	Clermont Auvergne		
Ronan O'Gara	Fly-half		Ireland	Munster		
Gordon D'Arcy	Centre		Ireland	Leinster		
Will Greenwood	Centre		England	Harlequins		
Gavin Henson	Centre		Wales	Ospreys		
Brian O'Driscoll	Centre		Ireland	Leinster		
Tom Shanklin	Centre		Wales	Cardiff Blues		
Ollie Smith	Centre		England	Leicester Tigers		
Shane Horgan	Wing		Ireland	Leinster		
Denis Hickie	Wing		Ireland	Leinster		
Jason Robinson	Wing		England	Sale Sharks		
Shane Williams	Wing		Wales	Ospreys		
Iain Balshaw	Full-back		England	Leeds Tykes		
Geordan Murphy	Full-back		Ireland	Leicester Tigers		
Josh Lewsey	Full-back		England	London Wasps		
Gareth Thomas	Full-back		Wales	Toulouse		

=== Additions to the squad ===
Injured England players Jonny Wilkinson, Phil Vickery and Mike Tindall were pencilled in to be added to the squad, subject to them regaining fitness. Only Wilkinson subsequently did so and was called up on 8 May.

Additional players were called up when players suffered injury (and in one case a ban) during the tour proper:

- Jonny Wilkinson (Newcastle Falcons and England) – added 8 May
- Mark Cueto (Sale Sharks and England) – added 17 May for Iain Balshaw
- Simon Shaw (Wasps and England) – added 2 June for Malcolm O'Kelly
- Simon Easterby (Llanelli Scarlets and Ireland) – added 4 June for Lawrence Dallaglio
- Ryan Jones (Ospreys and Wales) – added 10 June for Simon Taylor
- Brent Cockbain (Ospreys and Wales) – added 26 June for Danny Grewcock, who was banned for two months after biting Keven Mealamu during the first test.
- Jason White (Sale Sharks and Scotland) – added 27 June for Richard Hill

== Management ==
England coach Clive Woodward was first linked with the Lions' head-coaching job in December 2003, shortly after England's victory in the 2003 Rugby World Cup, when he was approached by Four Home Unions chairman Bill Beaumont. Woodward resigned as England coach on 3 September 2004, and appointed as Lions coach four days later following a meeting of the Lions committee. He named a 25-strong coaching group in October 2004, including his successor as England coach, Andy Robinson, and three-time Lions head coach Ian McGeechan. Some of the coaches on the tour would be responsible for the team playing on weekends, including Robinson, Eddie O'Sullivan and Phil Larder, while others would take charge of the midweek team, including McGeechan, Gareth Jenkins and Mike Ford. Former government communications consultant Alastair Campbell was added to the tour party in December 2004. The Welsh Rugby Union (WRU) initially requested that national team head coach Mike Ruddock be left out of the Lions coaching team to focus on the Wales job; however, in April 2005, Ruddock said he would be open to a position with the Lions if it had a "specific job description". Ruddock was offered an "observational role" on the tour, but ultimately rejected it in favour of joining the Wales under-21s at the 2005 Under 21 Rugby World Championship, and the Lions role was given to his assistant Scott Johnson.

Name	Role	Home country
Clive Woodward	Head coach	England
Bill Beaumont	Tour manager	England
Eddie O'Sullivan	Assistant coach	Ireland
Ian McGeechan	Assistant coach	Scotland
Gareth Jenkins	Assistant coach	Wales
Andy Robinson	Assistant coach	England
Louise Ramsay	Team manager	England
Phil Larder	Defensive coach	England
Mike Ford	Defensive coach	England
Dave Alred	Kicking coach	England
Dave Reddin	Fitness coach	England
Craig White	Fitness coach	England
David McHugh	Specialist advisor (referee)	Ireland
Tony Biscombe	Video analyst	England
Gavin Scott	Video analyst	Scotland
James Robson	Head doctor	Scotland
Gary O'Driscoll	Doctor	Ireland
Phil Pask	Physiotherapist	England
Stuart Barton	Physio/masseur	Scotland
Bob Stewart	Physio/masseur	Scotland
Richard Wegrzyk	Masseur	England
John Feehan	Chief executive	Ireland
Richard Smith	Legal support	England
Louisa Cheetham	Media officer	United States
Alastair Campbell	Press relations	England
Dave Campbell	Chef	England
Dave Tennison	Kit technician	England

== Matches ==
The Lions' tour schedule was announced in February 2004, and included 10 matches: three tests and seven tour matches. The tour was scheduled to begin with a match against Bay of Plenty on 4 June 2005, with the test series beginning three weeks later. The tour did not originally include a match against National Provincial Championship winners Auckland, but in September 2004 a match was added between the second and third tests. Another fixture against Argentina was added two weeks later, to be played at the Millennium Stadium in Cardiff on 23 May 2005.

=== Argentina ===
The Lions played Argentina in a warm-up test match at the Millennium Stadium in Cardiff on 23 May. The Pumas were without 25 players who may have made their first-choice team due to club commitments and the Lions rested many of their top players to field a second-string line-up. Tour captain Brian O'Driscoll was rested, so Wales vice-captain Michael Owen took his place.

The Lions looked disjointed, turning the ball over 15 times in open play. Their pack was outplayed; the Pumas shoved them off their own scrum three times. The Lions also conceded five penalties for holding on to the ball while grounded, usually because their support failed to arrive in time. In the meantime, the Pumas played a match that was almost universally called "inspired" by rugby media worldwide. The Pumas led 19–16 at half-time, and could easily have been ahead by more. The main plus for the Lions was the performance of Jonny Wilkinson, making his first appearance against international opposition since the 2003 Rugby World Cup Final; Wilkinson set up the Lions' first try, converted it and kicked six penalties. His last penalty saved the Lions from defeat, salvaging a 25–25 draw in the eighth minute of stoppage time. The match was granted full test status by the IRB in 2006.

23 May 2005
20:00 BST

British & Irish Lions	25–25	Argentina
Try: Smith; Con: Wilkinson; Pen: Wilkinson (6)	Report	Try: Núñez Piossek; Con: Todeschini; Pen: Todeschini (6)

Millennium Stadium, Cardiff
Attendance: 61,569
Referee: Stuart Dickinson (Australia)

FB	15	(Ireland) Geordan Murphy
RW	14	(Ireland) Denis Hickie
OC	13	(England) Ollie Smith
IC	12	(Ireland) Gordon D'Arcy
LW	11	(Wales) Shane Williams
FH	10	(England) Jonny Wilkinson
SH	9	(Wales) Gareth Cooper
N8	8	(Wales) Michael Owen (c)
OF	7	(England) Lewis Moody
BF	6	(England) Martin Corry
RL	5	(England) Danny Grewcock
LL	4	(Ireland) Donncha O'Callaghan
TP	3	(Ireland) John Hayes
HK	2	(Ireland) Shane Byrne
LP	1	(England) Graham Rowntree
Replacements:
HK	16	(England) Steve Thompson
PR	17	(England) Julian White
LK	18	(England) Ben Kay
N8	19	(England) Lawrence Dallaglio
SH	20	(Scotland) Chris Cusiter
FH	21	(Ireland) Ronan O'Gara
WG	22	(Ireland) Shane Horgan
Coach:
(England) Sir Clive Woodward

FB	15	Bernardo Stortoni
RW	14	José María Núñez Piossek
OC	13	Lisandro Arbizu
IC	12	Felipe Contepomi (c)
LW	11	Francisco Leonelli
FH	10	Federico Todeschini
SH	9	Nicolás Fernández Miranda
N8	8	Juan Manuel Leguizamón
OF	7	Martín Schusterman
BF	6	Federico Genoud
RL	5	Mariano Sambucetti
LL	4	Pablo Bouza
TP	3	Mauricio Reggiardo
HK	2	Mario Ledesma
LP	1	Federico Méndez
Replacements:
HK	16	Eusebio Guiñazú
PR	17	Lucio de Chazal
LK	18	Manuel Carizza
FL	19	Santiago Sanz
FH	20	Marcelo Bosch
WG	21	Lucas Borges
WG	22	Lucio López Fleming
Coach:
(Argentina) Marcelo Loffreda

=== Bay of Plenty Steamers ===
The first tour match was against the Bay of Plenty Steamers on 4 June in Rotorua. The Lions started the match strongly, with Josh Lewsey scoring a try after two minutes and then a second four minutes later. The Lions were up 17–0 after 11 minutes, but the Steamers recovered for a 17–17 half-time score. The Lions controlled the second half and won 34–20. A significant injury was the fractured ankle suffered by experienced back-rower Lawrence Dallaglio, who had to withdraw from the tour.

4 June 2005
19:10 NZST

Bay of Plenty Steamers	20–34	British & Irish Lions
Try: Williams; Bourke; Con: Williams (2); Pen: Williams (2)	Report	Try: Lewsey (2); Shanklin; D'Arcy; Peel; Cueto; Con: O'Gara (2)

Rotorua International Stadium, Rotorua
Attendance: 33,000
Referee: Paul Honiss (New Zealand)

=== Taranaki ===
Taranaki hosted the Lions at New Plymouth on 8 June. The first half was closely fought in more ways than one, as the Lions' Danny Grewcock and Taranaki's Paul Tito came to blows. The Amber-and-Blacks had a 7–6 lead at half-time, but soon after the break Martin Corry scored a try for the Lions. Shortly afterwards, Taranaki's Andrew Hore was sin-binned for holding the ball, and the Lions took control. Consensus man of the match Charlie Hodgson kicked two penalties during Hore's absence, and the Lions kept their momentum even after Hore returned. Shane Horgan added a try and Geordan Murphy two as the Lions won 36–14.

8 June 2005

Taranaki	14–36	British & Irish Lions
Try: Masoe; Watt; Con: Young (2)	Report	Try: Corry; Horgan; Murphy (2); Con: Hodgson (2); Pen: Hodgson (4)

Yarrow Stadium, New Plymouth
Attendance: 22,000

=== New Zealand Maori ===
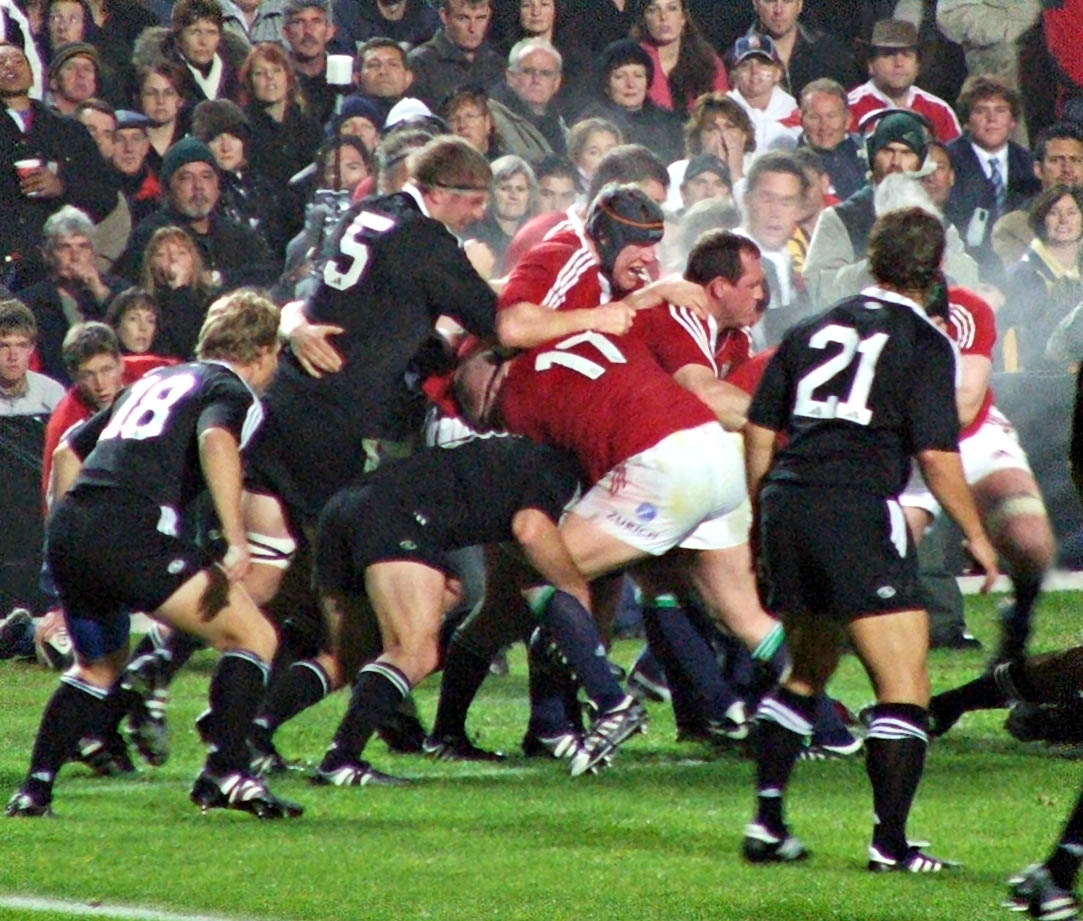
The Lions forwards are held in a maul by the New Zealand Maori

The match against the New Zealand Maori at Hamilton on 11 June promised to be the most competitive test lead-up, being billed by rugby media as virtually a fourth test. In the first half, the Maori had the better of possession and tackling, but the Lions had the better of the set-pieces, and the half ended 6–6.

Just before the break, Lions prop Andrew Sheridan was sin-binned for punching Maori fly-half Luke McAlister. When the sin-bin period ended, Sheridan was replaced by Gethin Jenkins. A McAlister penalty shortly afterwards, a Leon MacDonald try (converted by McAlister) and then a second McAlister penalty gave the Maori a 19–6 lead. The last 15 minutes were the Lions' best period, rewarded by a Brian O'Driscoll try, which was converted by Stephen Jones. The Lions threatened strongly, but the Maori, inspired by their replacement fly-half Carlos Spencer and stalwart captain Jono Gibbes held on for a 19–13 win – their first ever over the Lions.

11 June 2005

New Zealand Maori	19–13	British & Irish Lions
Try: MacDonald; Con: McAlister; Pen: Hill (2); McAlister (2)	Report	Try: O'Driscoll; Con: S. Jones; Pen: S. Jones (2)

Waikato Stadium, Hamilton
Attendance: 26,500

=== Wellington Lions ===
After the loss to the Maori, the Lions went to Wellington to take on the city's NPC side, the Wellington Lions, on 15 June. The British & Irish Lions team was selected primarily from players in contention for the test team, including Jonny Wilkinson in his first tour match.

The British & Irish Lions had most of the possession and scoring chances, but committed numerous unforced errors when points looked likely. Tries came from Gethin Jenkins and Gareth Thomas, both converted by Wilkinson, who also scored three penalties. The British & Irish Lions' 23–6 win, while seemingly showing their tour was back on track, left almost as many questions as answers. In post-match comments, O'Driscoll said, "The ball was like a bar of soap out there and both sides made a lot of unforced errors." Wellington Lions coach John Plumtree remarked, "The All Blacks would have put 50 or 60 points on us."

15 June 2005

Wellington Lions	6–23	British & Irish Lions
Pen: Gopperth (2)	Report	Try: Jenkins; Thomas; Con: Wilkinson (2); Pen: Wilkinson (3)

Wellington Regional Stadium, Wellington
Attendance: 34,000

=== Otago ===
In their first appearance in the South Island, the Lions played Otago on 18 June at Carisbrook in Dunedin. The stadium is known to visiting teams as the "House of Pain", particularly for the Lions, who had lost games to the Otago side on four previous tours.

Otago began strongly and the Lions were penalised four times in the first 11 minutes, Otago converting two. The Lions' stronger scrum play brought them back into the game, and the first half was closely fought, ending 13–13. The Lions clearly had the momentum, as Will Greenwood scored a try, converted by Charlie Hodgson, just before the break.

Otago took a 16–13 lead shortly after half-time, but strong Lions scrum play led to a try from man of the match Ryan Jones, who put himself in contention for a test position. The try and Hodgson's conversion gave the Lions a solid, though far from insurmountable, lead. Otago rallied to 20–19 with a penalty, but the Lions pulled away soon afterwards. A Hodgson penalty and a try from Shane Williams converted by Hodgson took the final margin to 30–19.

18 June 2005

Otago	19–30	British & Irish Lions
Try: Lee; Con: Evans; Pen: Evans (4)	Report	Try: Greenwood; R. Jones; S. Williams; Con: Hodgson (3); Pen: Hodgson (3)

Carisbrook, Dunedin
Attendance: 38,000

=== Southland Stags ===
The Southland match at Invercargill on 21 June was the last before the first test. Lions coach Clive Woodward announced that no players in the night's line-up would play in the test.

In the first 15 minutes, the Lions looked formidable as they took an early 10–0 lead over the Stags, keyed by a Gavin Henson try. However, they became disjointed and by half-time had turned over the ball 14 times and were considered lucky to be ahead 10–3 at the break.

The first few minutes of the second half were even worse for the Lions, as Hale T-Pole scored a converted try. Woodward immediately substituted four players to settle down his team. T-Pole made an interception to save a Mark Cueto try, but the Lions kept the pressure on, and Henson scored his second try. The Lions then changed tactics, choosing to kick for territory more often, and were never truly threatened again, winning by 26–16.

21 June 2005

Southland Stags	16–26	British & Irish Lions
Try: T-Pole; Con: Apanui; Pen: Apanui (3)	Report	Try: Henson (2); Con: O'Gara (2); Pen: O'Gara (4)

Rugby Park, Invercargill
Attendance: 17,000

=== First test ===
Less than two minutes into the first test, the Lions lost their captain Brian O'Driscoll to injury after a joint tackle by New Zealand captain Tana Umaga and hooker Keven Mealamu. At a ruck, they attempted to clear O'Driscoll by each lifting one of his legs before driving him into the ground. O'Driscoll twisted his body as he came down to avoid landing on his head, but that meant most of the force went through his shoulder, which was dislocated, ending his tour. Opinions differed on the incident; the Lions staff and many British and Irish commentators believed that it was an illegal spear tackle, and Lions coach Woodward reported the pair to the IRB's citing commissioner, William Venter. Venter decided, based on the video footage available, not to refer the matter to a disciplinary tribunal. New Zealand commentators largely took the view that the two All Blacks were just clearing out the ruck and had no intention to injure O'Driscoll. Referee Joël Jutge admitted in 2017 that he should have shown at least one red card to Umaga and Mealamu for the tackle.

Eight minutes into the game, Dan Carter opened the scoring for the All Blacks with a penalty. Three minutes later, the Lions suffered a further blow when Paul O'Connell was sin-binned for a professional foul, and Carter kicked the penalty. Already a player short, the Lions then lost Richard Hill to injury. Ali Williams scored the first New Zealand try shortly after O'Connell returned, and the half ended with the Lions down 11–0.

Carter kicked a penalty in the second half, followed by a converted try from Sitiveni Sivivatu to end the All Blacks' scoring, and Jonny Wilkinson kicked a penalty in the 56th minute to provide the Lions with their only points of the night. The 21–3 win was considered by almost every commentator to be even more one-sided than the score indicated. The Lions' sloppy set-piece play included ten losses of their own line-outs.

It was announced after the match that, in addition to O'Driscoll, two more injured Lions were out for the rest of the tour – Hill from the incident during the match, and Tom Shanklin for inflammation from an existing knee injury. Danny Grewcock was also suspended for two months after he was cited for biting All Blacks hooker Keven Mealamu.

25 June 2005
19:00 NZST

New Zealand	21–3	British & Irish Lions
Try: Sivivatu; Williams; Con: Carter; Pen: Carter (3)	Report	Pen: Wilkinson

Lancaster Park, Christchurch
Attendance: 37,200
Referee: Joël Jutge (France)

FB	15	Leon MacDonald
RW	14	Doug Howlett
OC	13	Tana Umaga (c)
IC	12	Aaron Mauger
LW	11	Sitiveni Sivivatu
FH	10	Dan Carter
SH	9	Justin Marshall
N8	8	Rodney So'oialo
OF	7	Richie McCaw
BF	6	Jerry Collins
RL	5	Ali Williams
LL	4	Chris Jack
TP	3	Carl Hayman
HK	2	Keven Mealamu
LP	1	Tony Woodcock
Replacements:
HK	16	Derren Witcombe
PR	17	Greg Somerville
FL	18	Jono Gibbes
FL	19	Sione Lauaki
SH	20	Byron Kelleher
FB	21	Mils Muliaina
WG	22	Rico Gear
Coach:
(New Zealand) Graham Henry

FB	15	(England) Jason Robinson
RW	14	(England) Josh Lewsey
OC	13	(Ireland) Brian O'Driscoll (c)
IC	12	(England) Jonny Wilkinson
LW	11	(Wales) Gareth Thomas
FH	10	(Wales) Stephen Jones
SH	9	(Wales) Dwayne Peel
N8	8	(England) Martin Corry
OF	7	(England) Neil Back
BF	6	(England) Richard Hill
RL	5	(England) Ben Kay
LL	4	(Ireland) Paul O'Connell
TP	3	(England) Julian White
HK	2	(Ireland) Shane Byrne
LP	1	(Wales) Gethin Jenkins
Replacements:
HK	16	(England) Steve Thompson
PR	17	(England) Graham Rowntree
LK	18	(England) Danny Grewcock
N8	19	(Wales) Ryan Jones
SH	20	(England) Matt Dawson
CE	21	(England) Will Greenwood
WG	22	(Ireland) Shane Horgan
Coach:
(England) Sir Clive Woodward

=== Manawatu Turbos ===
The Lions scored their first convincing tour victory in this game at Palmerston North against NPC second division side Manawatu Turbos, winning 109–6. They led 38–6 at half time and scored 71 unanswered points in the second. Welshman Shane Williams scored five tries to help the Lions post their all-time record score in New Zealand, surpassing their 64–5 victory over Marlborough/Nelson 46 years earlier. In addition to Williams' five, the Lions' tries were scored by Ronan O'Gara (2), Mark Cueto (2), Geordan Murphy, Charlie Hodgson, Jason Robinson, Martin Corry, Neil Back, Gareth Cooper, Gordon D'Arcy and Ollie Smith, with Manawatu restricted to two Jonathan Hargreaves penalties. Lock Donncha O'Callaghan and flanker Martyn Williams were substituted at half-time but had impressed enough to secure test selection for the following Saturday. Murphy also impressed at full-back, but it was Shane Williams, with elusive running and awareness, who most thrilled Lions supporters.

28 June 2005

Manawatu Turbos	6–109	British & Irish Lions
Pen: Hargreaves (2)	Report	Try: S. Williams (5); Corry; Murphy; Robinson; Hodgson; Smith; Back; D'Arcy; O'Gara (2); Cueto (2); Cooper; Con: Hodgson (7); O'Gara (5)

Arena Manawatu, Palmerston North
Attendance: 13,000

=== Second test ===
From the high point against Manawatu, the Lions fell to a low in the second test at Wellington Regional Stadium in Wellington on 2 July, losing 48–18 and conceding the highest number of points against a New Zealand team in a test. Woodward selected a radically different test squad from the one that had been embarrassed in Christchurch a week earlier, replacing eleven players. Key to the Lions' hopes of staying in the series was Woodward's decision to add several of the Welsh team that won the Grand Slam in the 2005 Six Nations.

The Lions started strongly, with captain Gareth Thomas scoring a try under the posts and Jonny Wilkinson converting two minutes in. A minute later, Wilkinson hit the post with a penalty attempt, but gathering the rebound the Lions were in a good attacking position when Paul O'Connell was penalised for diving over a ruck. The All Blacks settled down and then scored through two Dan Carter penalties before he set up their first try, racing 50 metres off a turnover before offloading to captain Tana Umaga to score near the posts. Although the rest of the half remained close, the All Blacks went into the break with a 21–13 lead. The second half turned into a showcase for New Zealand in general and Carter in particular. He scored two tries, converted three, kicked two penalties, and constantly kept the Lions on the back foot with his distribution. Flanker Richie McCaw powered his way over for a try after Carter missed a hat trick by a matter of inches.British rugby media were in virtually unanimous agreement that the Lions were greatly improved but that the All Blacks were simply too dominant. Carter's tally of 33 points broke the all-time record for points by an All Black against the Lions.

2 July 2005
19:00 NZST

New Zealand	48–18	British & Irish Lions
Try: Carter (2); McCaw; Sivivatu; Umaga; Con: Carter (4); Pen: Carter (5)	Report	Try: Easterby; Thomas; Con: Wilkinson; Pen: Wilkinson (2)

Wellington Regional Stadium, Wellington
Attendance: 39,800
Referee: Andrew Cole (Australia)

FB	15	Mils Muliaina
RW	14	Rico Gear
OC	13	Tana Umaga (c)
IC	12	Aaron Mauger
LW	11	Sitiveni Sivivatu
FH	10	Dan Carter
SH	9	Byron Kelleher
N8	8	Rodney So'oialo
OF	7	Richie McCaw
BF	6	Jerry Collins
RL	5	Ali Williams
LL	4	Chris Jack
TP	3	Greg Somerville
HK	2	Keven Mealamu
LP	1	Tony Woodcock
Replacements:
HK	16	Derren Witcombe
PR	17	Campbell Johnstone
FL	18	Jono Gibbes
FL	19	Sione Lauaki
SH	20	Justin Marshall
CE	21	Ma'a Nonu
FB	22	Leon MacDonald
Coach:
(New Zealand) Graham Henry

FB	15	(England) Josh Lewsey
RW	14	(England) Jason Robinson
OC	13	(Wales) Gareth Thomas (c)
IC	12	(Wales) Gavin Henson
LW	11	(Wales) Shane Williams
FH	10	(England) Jonny Wilkinson
SH	9	(Wales) Dwayne Peel
N8	8	(Wales) Ryan Jones
OF	7	(England) Lewis Moody
BF	6	(Ireland) Simon Easterby
RL	5	(Ireland) Donncha O'Callaghan
LL	4	(Ireland) Paul O'Connell
TP	3	(England) Julian White
HK	2	(England) Steve Thompson
LP	1	(Wales) Gethin Jenkins
Replacements:
HK	16	(Ireland) Shane Byrne
PR	17	(England) Graham Rowntree
FL	18	(England) Martin Corry
FL	19	(Wales) Martyn Williams
SH	20	(England) Matt Dawson
FH	21	(Wales) Stephen Jones
WG	22	(Ireland) Shane Horgan
Coach:
(England) Sir Clive Woodward

=== Auckland ===
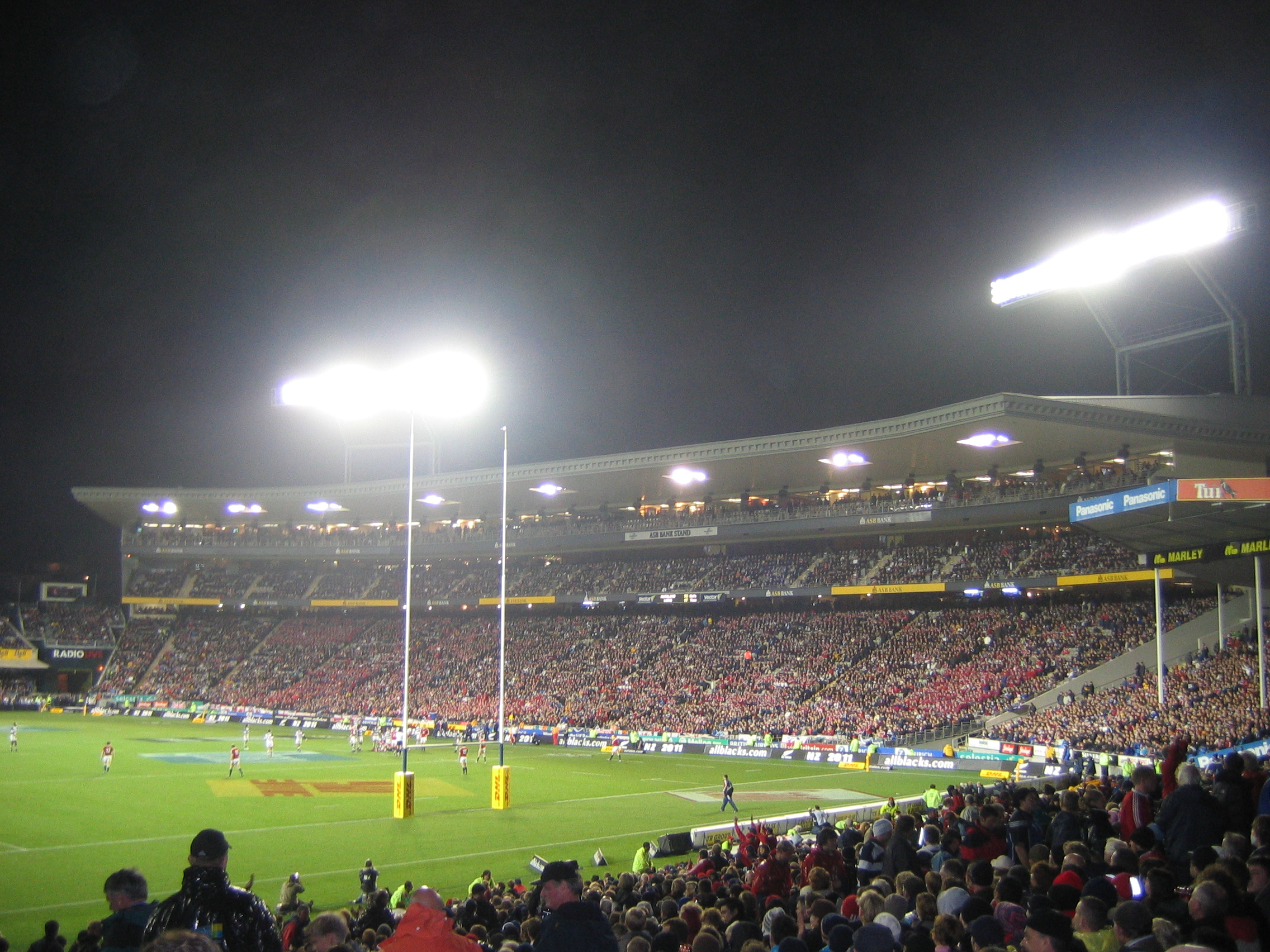
Auckland v Lions

Having lost the test series on the previous Saturday, the midweek Lions came to Eden Park with something to prove. The match was marked by the Lions' inability to find touch and Auckland's willingness to attack. Auckland gave up some guaranteed points from early penalties to take the Lions on in set piece play. Auckland tighthead prop John Afoa was denied a try after a tap and run saw him held up in goal. A series of handling errors throughout the first half let Auckland down and saw the Lions to a 14–3 lead at the half. The second half saw the Lions give away points to a stoic Auckland pack and the scoreline was narrowed to 14–13 Lions lead. A late Ronan O'Gara penalty saw the Lions extend to a four-point winning margin of 17–13. This victory completed a clean sweep of matches for the midweek Lions against host unions throughout New Zealand.

5 July 2005

Auckland	13–17	British & Irish Lions
Try: Nacewa; Con: Ward; Pen: Ward (2)	Report	Try: M. Williams; Pen: Hodgson; O'Gara (3)

Eden Park, Auckland
Attendance: 45,000

=== Third test ===
Following two early penalties by Stephen Jones, the Lions led 6–0 and things looked promising for them. All Black captain Tana Umaga was sin-binned for killing the ball, but even without their captain, the All Blacks managed to score two tries, by Conrad Smith and Ali Williams, both converted by Luke McAlister. The Lions were awarded two more penalties, which Stephen Jones kicked, but just before the break, Umaga scored a try to give the All Blacks a half-time lead of 24–12.

Seven minutes into the second half Umaga scored another try. Soon after, scrum-half Byron Kelleher was replaced by Justin Marshall, who then played his final half-hour of All Black rugby. Another All Black try was thwarted when Jerry Collins was sin-binned for a late tackle. The All Blacks then spent several minutes defending as the Lions pushed towards the line from within ten meters, and after a long struggle Lewis Moody managed to score, making it 31–19. Both sides made errors that cost them tries. Sitiveni Sivivatu had two very close calls but it was Rico Gear who followed his own deep kick to toe the ball over the line and score a fine individual try. McAlister converted, giving him a 100 percent kicking rate, to make the full-time score 38–19.

9 July 2005
19:00 NZST

New Zealand	38–19	British & Irish Lions
Try: Gear; Smith; Umaga (2); Williams; Con: McAlister (5); Pen: McAlister	Report	Try: Moody; Con: S. Jones; Pen: S. Jones (4)

Eden Park, Auckland
Attendance: 48,533
Referee: Jonathan Kaplan (South Africa)

FB	15	Mils Muliaina
RW	14	Rico Gear
OC	13	Conrad Smith
IC	12	Tana Umaga (c)
LW	11	Sitiveni Sivivatu
FH	10	Luke McAlister
SH	9	Byron Kelleher
N8	8	Sione Lauaki
OF	7	Rodney So'oialo
BF	6	Jerry Collins
RL	5	Ali Williams
LL	4	Chris Jack
TP	3	Greg Somerville
HK	2	Keven Mealamu
LP	1	Tony Woodcock
Replacements:
HK	16	Derren Witcombe
PR	17	Campbell Johnstone
LK	18	James Ryan
FL	19	Marty Holah
SH	20	Justin Marshall
FH	21	Nick Evans
WG	22	Doug Howlett
Coach:
(New Zealand) Graham Henry

FB	15	(Ireland) Geordan Murphy
RW	14	(England) Mark Cueto
OC	13	(England) Will Greenwood
IC	12	(Wales) Gareth Thomas (c)
LW	11	(England) Josh Lewsey
FH	10	(Wales) Stephen Jones
SH	9	(Wales) Dwayne Peel
N8	8	(Wales) Ryan Jones
OF	7	(England) Lewis Moody
BF	6	(Ireland) Simon Easterby
RL	5	(Ireland) Paul O'Connell
LL	4	(Ireland) Donncha O'Callaghan
TP	3	(England) Julian White
HK	2	(Ireland) Shane Byrne
LP	1	(Wales) Gethin Jenkins
Replacements:
HK	16	(Scotland) Gordon Bulloch
PR	17	(England) Graham Rowntree
FL	18	(England) Martin Corry
FL	19	(Wales) Martyn Williams
SH	20	(England) Matt Dawson
FH	21	(Ireland) Ronan O'Gara
WG	22	(Ireland) Shane Horgan
Coach:
(England) Sir Clive Woodward

== Lions anthem ==
Sir Clive Woodward commissioned an anthem, The Power of Four, specially for the 2005 tour. Neil Myers composed the tune, and the piece was performed for the first time in public by Welsh opera singer Katherine Jenkins before the Lions' match against Argentina at the Millennium Stadium in 2005. It was played before all games on the tour, but was not used in the Lions tour to South Africa in 2009.
