= Thomas Umaga-Jensen =

- Full name: Thomas Umaga-Jensen
- Born: 31 December 1997 (age 28) Lower Hutt, New Zealand
- Height: 187 cm (6 ft 2 in)
- Weight: 107 kg (236 lb; 16 st 12 lb)
- School: Scots College
- Notable relative(s): Peter Umaga-Jensen (brother); Tana Umaga (uncle); Jerry Collins (uncle); Mike Umaga (uncle); Jacob Umaga (cousin)

Rugby union career
- Position: Centre
- Current team: Toyota Shuttles, Otago
Senior career
Years	Team	Apps	(Points)
2017–2019	Wellington	23	(55)
2018–2025	Highlanders	42	(30)
2020–	Otago	25	(20)
2025–	Toyota Shuttles	13	(25)
- Correct as of 1 October 2025
International career
Years	Team	Apps	(Points)
2017	New Zealand U20	4	(5)
- Correct as of 1 October 2025

Thomas Umaga-Jensen (born 31 December 1997) is a New Zealand rugby union player who plays for the Highlanders in the Super Rugby competition. Thomas has been on the radar since high school where he and his twin brother Peter Umaga-Jensen were stand-outs in the Scots College 1st XV for several years. Umaga-Jensen was a member of the winning New Zealand U20s team that travelled to Georgia in 2017 and convincingly beat England U20s in the final. His position of choice is Second Five-Eighth. In 2020 He moved to Otago.

== Family ==
Thomas's brother Peter Umaga-Jensen has also represented Wellington at rugby at senior level. They are the nephews of former All Black captain Tana Umaga and All Black star Jerry Collins
