= Jacob Umaga =

England & Samoa international rugby union player (born 1998)

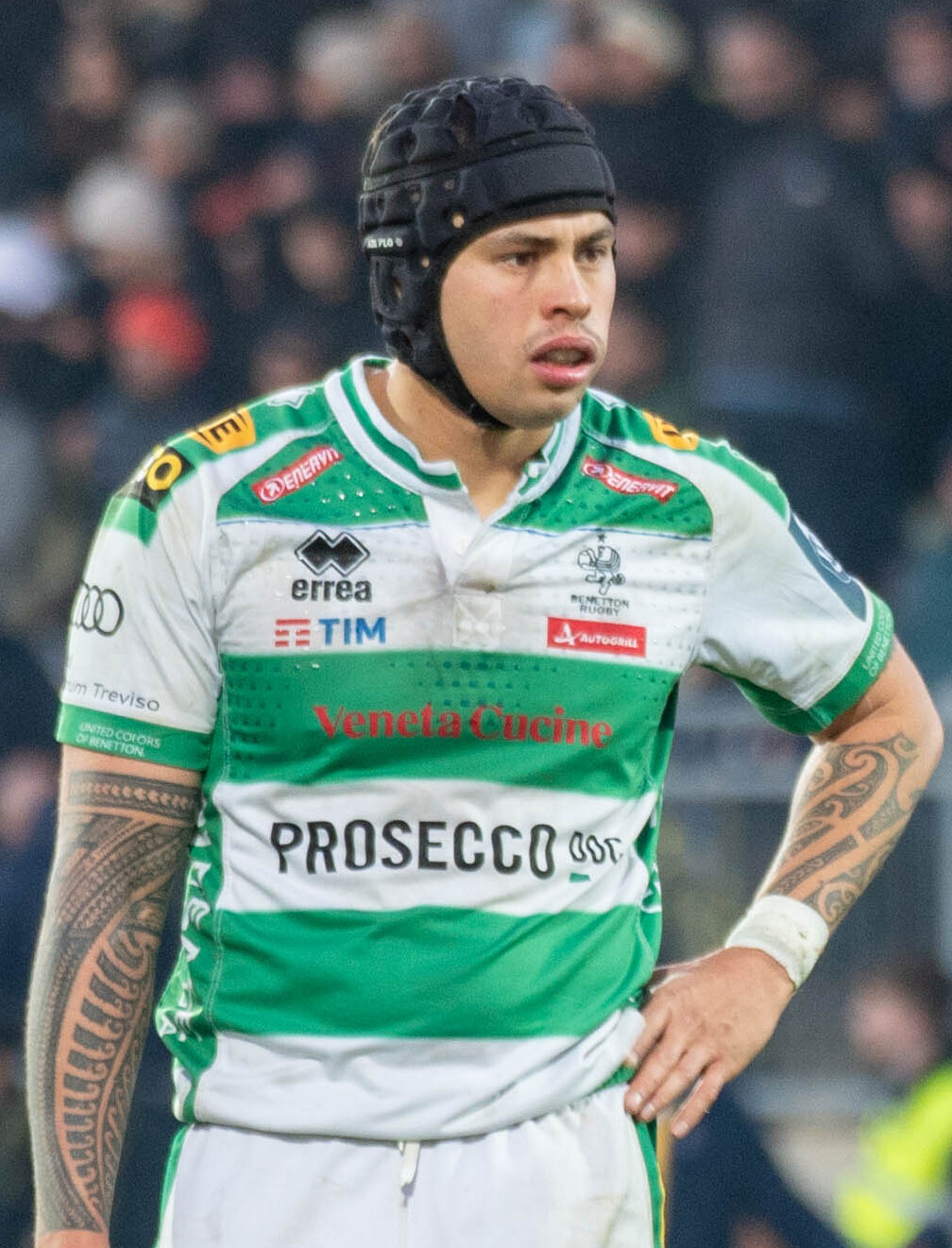
- Umaga with Benetton in December 2025
- Born: Jacob Ionatana Falefasa Umaga; 8 July 1998 (age 28) Halifax, West Yorkshire, England
- Height: 1.82 m (5 ft 11 1/2 in)
- Weight: 91 kg (14 st 5 lb; 201 lb)
- School: Kenilworth School
- Notable relative(s): Mike Umaga (father); Tana Umaga (uncle); Thomas Umaga-Jensen (cousin); Peter Umaga-Jensen (cousin); Jerry Collins (cousin-once-removed)

Rugby union career
- Position: Fly-half
- Current team: Benetton
Senior career
Years	Team	Apps	(Points)
2016–2022	Wasps	72	(379)
2016	→ Hinckley (loan)	11	(25)
2016–2017	→ Broadstreet (loan)		
2019	→ Yorkshire Carnegie (loan)	5	(24)
2018	Auckland	9	(2)
2022−	Benetton	76	(375)
- Correct as of 28 November 2025
International career
Years	Team	Apps	(Points)
2016	England U18s	14	(30)
2017	England U20s	8	(22)
2021	England	1	(0)
2025−	Samoa	4	(34)
- Correct as of 18 November 2025

Jacob Umaga (born 8 July 1998) is a professional Samoan rugby union player who plays at fly-half for Italian United Rugby Championship side Benetton. A one-cap international for England in 2021, Umaga switched to represent the Samoan national team in 2025 qualifying on ancestry grounds.

== Early life ==
Umaga was born in Halifax. His father, Mike Umaga, won 13 caps for Samoa, his uncle Tana Umaga played 74 times for New Zealand and captained the All Blacks, and his father's cousin was the late Jerry Collins.

Umaga was educated at Kenilworth School and Sports College and played youth rugby for Kenilworth RFC. He supports rugby league team Bradford Bulls.

== Club career ==
Umaga was originally a member of the Leicester Tigers academy but left to join Wasps at the age of eighteen. He represented Hinckley RFC in National League 2 North during the 2016–17 campaign scoring five tries in eleven appearances, including an individual try at Preston Grasshoppers. In 2018, Umaga was part of the Auckland squad that won the Mitre Cup. The following year saw him loaned to Yorkshire Carnegie for the 2018–19 RFU Championship.

In October 2020, Umaga scored a try for Wasps as they lost to Exeter Chiefs in the Premiership final to finish runners up.

Umaga was made redundant along with every other Wasps player and coach when the team entered administration on 17 October 2022. He instead signed a two-year deal with Italy region Benetton in the URC from the 2022-23 season. His stay was later extended to 2026.

== International career ==
=== England ===
Umaga was a member of the England Under-20 side that completed a grand slam during the 2017 Six Nations Under 20s Championship. Later that year, he started for the side that finished runners up to New Zealand in the final of the 2017 World Rugby Under 20 Championship.

In January 2020, Umaga received his first call-up to the senior England squad by coach Eddie Jones for the 2020 Six Nations Championship. On 4 July 2021, Umaga won his only cap for England off the bench in a 43–29 victory against the United States.

=== Samoa ===
Having not played for England since 2021, Umaga was called up for the Samoan national team in 2025, for which he qualifies by ancestry. On 18 July 2025, Umaga made his first appearance for Samoa starting in a defeat against Scotland at Eden Park.

In November 2025, Umaga scored his first international try in a victory over Brazil during the 2027 Mens World Cup Qualification tournament. In their last game in Dubai he contributed eight points in a draw against Belgium which secured their place at the world cup.

=== List of international tries ===
As of 8 November 2025

No.	Date	Venue	Opponent	Score	Result	Competition	Ref.
1	8 November 2025	The Sevens Stadium, Dubai, United Arab Emirates	Brazil	5–0	48–10	2027 Rugby World Cup Final Qualification Tournament	
