= Peter Umaga-Jensen =

NZ international rugby union player

- Full name: Peter Ionatana Jack Umaga-Jensen
- Born: 31 December 1997 (age 28) Lower Hutt, New Zealand
- Height: 187 cm (6 ft 2 in)
- Weight: 102 kg (225 lb; 16 st 1 lb)
- School: Scots College
- Notable relative(s): Thomas Umaga-Jensen (brother); Tana Umaga (uncle); Jerry Collins (uncle); Mike Umaga (uncle); Jacob Umaga (cousin)

Rugby union career
- Position(s): Centre, Fullback
- Current team: Kintetsu Liners
Senior career
Years	Team	Apps	(Points)
2016–	Wellington	68	(100)
2018–2025	Hurricanes	53	(65)
2025–	Kintetsu Liners	14	(35)
- Correct as of 2 June 2025
International career
Years	Team	Apps	(Points)
2016	New Zealand U20	2	(5)
2020	North Island	1	(0)
2020	New Zealand	1	(0)
2026–	Samoa	6	(14)
- Correct as of 22 October 2022

Peter Ionatana Jack Umaga-Jensen (born 31 December 1997) is a New Zealand rugby union player who currently plays as a centre or outside back for the Hanazono Kintetsu Liners in the Japan Rugby League One (JRLO). Umaga-Jensen previously played for Wellington in New Zealand's domestic Mitre 10 Cup and for the Hurricanes in Super Rugby Aotearoa.

== Early life and education ==
Umaga-Jensen was born in Lower Hutt, in the Wellington Region of the North Island of New Zealand. He started playing rugby for his local side Wainuiomata Rugby Football Club when he was 5 years old.

Umaga-Jensen attended Scots College in Wellington city and captained their 1st XV to win the national boys high school competition in 2014.

== Rugby career ==
=== Wellington ===
Umaga-Jensen was named in the Wellington Lions squad for the 2016 Mitre 10 Cup and quickly became a regular in the side, playing 8 times and scoring 1 try.

=== Hurricanes ===
After one season at provincial level, Umaga-Jensen was signed up by defending Super Rugby champions, the Hurricanes ahead of the 2017 Super Rugby season. He made his debut against the Reds in 2018, but had a hard time with injuries. At end of the 2019 season he signed a new deal with the Canes that will keep him stay at the club until 2021.

In 2020, Umaga-Jensen established himself as first-choice 13 for the Hurricanes during the Super Rugby Aotearoa competition. He earned praise for his performances, in particular the win against the Crusaders. The match was specially significant since it ended the Cantabrians' four-year unbeaten home run — the Crusaders' first loss at home in 37 games since they were also beaten by the Hurricanes in July 2016.

== International career ==
Umaga-Jensen was a member of the New Zealand Under 20 side which competed in the 2016 World Rugby Under 20 Championship in England where he scored a try in his only appearance. He also represented his country the following year, helping the New Zealand U20's win the 2017 Junior World Rugby Championship held in Georgia.

Umaga-Jensen made his international debut for the All Blacks on 18 October 2020 against Australia at Auckland.

== Personal life ==
Peter's twin brother Thomas Umaga-Jensen has also represented Wellington at rugby at senior level and has played Super Rugby for the Highlanders. They are the nephews of former All Black captain Tana Umaga and the late former All Black Jerry Collins.
