= Graham Jack =

- Full name: Graham Robert Jack
- Born: 19 June 1970 (age 56)
- Notable relative: Chris Jack (brother)
- Occupation: Engineer

Rugby union career
- Position: Lock
Provincial / State sides
Years	Team	Apps	(Points)
1992–93	Manawatu	5	(0)
1996–98	Canterbury	21	(20)
Super Rugby
Years	Team	Apps	(Points)
1998	Crusaders	4	(0)

Graham Robert Jack (born 19 June 1970) is a New Zealand former professional rugby union player.

A lock, Jack was active in first-class rugby during the 1990s, playing with Manawatu and Canterbury. He had a season with the Crusaders in 1998 and made four appearances, two in the starting XV, then was left out of their 1999 campaign after Todd Blackadder was moved to the second row.

Jack, an aircraft engineer, is the elder brother of All Black Chris Jack and father of Crusaders player Liam Jack.
