= Julian White =

British Lions & England international rugby union player

Julian White MBE
- Born: Julian White; 14 May 1973 (age 53) Plymouth, England
- Height: 1.85 m (6 ft 1 in)
- Weight: 118 kg (18 st 8 lb)

Rugby union career
- Position: Prop
Senior career
Years	Team	Apps	(Points)
1997	Crusaders	1	(0)
1998–1999	Bridgend RFC		
1999–2001	Saracens	36	(15)
2001–2003	Bristol Shoguns	27	(5)
2003–2012	Leicester Tigers	96	(10)
International career
Years	Team	Apps	(Points)
2000–2009	England	51	(0)
2005	British & Irish Lions	4	(0)
- Correct as of 20:26, 4 February 2011 (UTC)

Julian Martin White MBE (born 14 May 1973) is an English Landowner, best known for his time playing professional rugby union as a prop for Leicester Tigers and England. White was regarded as an aggressive tighthead prop, one of the most powerful forwards in the game, and for his destructive scrummaging.

== Biography ==
White was born 14 May 1973 in Plymouth, Devon. As a child he played mini and junior rugby for Salcombe and had played in the same senior side as his father, a former Plymouth Albion player. He served his rugby union apprenticeship with Okehampton and Plymouth Albion and had a spell in New Zealand with Hawke's Bay and Canterbury Crusaders. He made his debut for Hawke's Bay in August 1996 and appeared in the NZ Provincial Championship. He made his only Super 12 appearance as a replacement for the Crusaders against Natal in Christchurch in April 1997.

His time in New Zealand ended in tragedy; he was involved in an auto accident in which a young woman was killed and he suffered a broken leg. As he remembers it,

It was pretty horrific. I was trapped and my head hit the steering wheel. When I came round, my car was inside hers. Both cars were alight. My seatbelt wouldn't open. I bent my seat backwards getting out. Her car was an inferno. I couldn't get near it so started crawling up the road.

He returned to the UK when a Welsh coach who had worked with White at Hawke's Bay told him that Bridgend desperately needed a tighthead. White played for Bridgend in 1998–99 before moving to Saracens in 1999. He swiftly made his Premiership debut in the 28–23 defeat of London Irish at Vicarage Road, Watford on the opening weekend of the season.

White made his England debut against South Africa on England's Summer 2000 tour there. He appeared in his first Twickenham Test against Argentina in November 2001, playing until half time when he was replaced by Phil Vickery.

He toured North America in the summer of 2001, forming a solid front row with Graham Rowntree and Dorian West.

At the start of the 2001–02 season he transferred back to the West Country with Bristol Shoguns. This occurred after a protracted affair where White had attempted to get out of the contract he had signed with Bristol. White did not endear himself to Bristol supporters as he had tried to break out of his contract to join bitter local rivals Bath. In the event, White did become a Bristol player. Along with teammate Daryl Gibson, he joined Leicester Tigers for the 2003–04 season after Bristol were relegated. Replacing the retiring Darren Garforth, his Leicester debut was held over as he was in Australia on duty with England at the 2003 Rugby Union World Cup.

During the World Cup he was in the starting line up against Samoa and came on as a replacement against Uruguay. As part of the victorious squad, White was awarded an MBE.

In 2004, White took the opportunity to demonstrate his scrummaging skills in the England front row during the Six Nations and the summer tour to the Southern Hemisphere.

He was one of the players named in the 2005 British & Irish Lions squad to tour New Zealand, and started in all three tests.

Prior to the 2007 Rugby Union World Cup, White made himself unavailable for selection and did not feature in another England game. In January 2009, it was announced that he had been selected for the England Saxons squad. Later that year, following the suspension of Matt Stevens, he was called up to the full England squad as a replacement.

White was part of the Leicester squads that won the 2007 and 2009 Premiership finals.

== Personal life ==
White met his Welsh wife, Sara, in a Cardiff bar in 2004. The couple have two daughters and a son.
