= Liam Jack =

New Zealand rugby union player

- Born: 22 August 2004 (age 22) New Zealand
- Height: 201 cm (6 ft 7 in)
- Weight: 114 kg (251 lb; 17 st 13 lb)
- School: Christ's College, Christchurch
- University: Ara Institute of Canterbury
- Notable relative(s): Graham Jack (father); Chris Jack (uncle)

Rugby union career
- Position: Lock
- Current team: Crusaders, Canterbury
Senior career
Years	Team	Apps	(Points)
2024–	Canterbury	11	(0)
2026–	Crusaders		
- Correct as of 9 November 2025
International career
Years	Team	Apps	(Points)
2024	New Zealand U20	6	(0)
- Correct as of 9 November 2025

Liam Jack (born 22 August 2004) is a New Zealand rugby union player, who plays for the Crusaders and Canterbury. His preferred position is lock.

== Early career ==
Jack attended Christ's College, Christchurch where he played both rugby and basketball. He earned selection for New Zealand Schools in 2022, and represented the Crusaders U20 side in 2024. His performances earned him selection for the New Zealand U20 side in 2024. The son of former Crusaders player Graham Jack and nephew of former All Black Chris Jack, He is currently studying at Ara Institute of Canterbury.

== Professional career ==
Jack has represented Canterbury in the National Provincial Championship since 2024, being named in the squad for the 2025 Bunnings NPC. He was named in the Crusaders squad for the 2026 Super Rugby Pacific season.
