= Angus Macdonald (rugby union) =

- Born: Angus James Macdonald; 12 January 1981 (age 45) Whangārei, New Zealand
- Height: 1.94 m (6 ft 4 1/2 in)
- Weight: 107 kg (16 st 12 lb)

Rugby union career
- Position: Loose forward
Senior career
Years	Team	Apps	(Points)
2001–07	Auckland	41	(30)
2008–11	Toyota Verblitz		
2011–12	Coca-Cola West Red Sparks	10	(0)
2012–13	Glasgow Warriors	4	(0)
- Correct as of 23 October 2012
Super Rugby
Years	Team	Apps	(Points)
2003–07	Blues	44	(5)
- Correct as of 24 October 2012
International career
Years	Team	Apps	(Points)
2005	New Zealand	2	(0)
2005	Māori	2	(0)
- Correct as of 24 October 2012

Angus James Macdonald (born 12 January 1981) is a retired New Zealand rugby union player. Macdonald has played for Auckland, the Blues, Toyota Verblitz, Coca-Cola Redsparks, Glasgow Warriors, New Zealand Maori and the All Blacks in a career that began in 2001. Angus Macdonald is known for his versatility, as he has played in various positions in the forwards including Lock, Flanker and Number 8. It was this ability to play multiple positions capably that led to his selection in the 2005 Northern Hemisphere tour, he joined Chris Masoe, Neemia Tialata Isaia Toeava as All Black coach Graham Henry looked to strengthen depth by breaking in players that could take up many positions. Macdonald was part of the champion Blues Super 14 campaign in 2003 and has captained his province; at the young age of 24.

Angus comes from a strong rugby bloodline as his father Hamish Macdonald and his uncle Doug Bruce played for the All Blacks, while another uncle Roddy Macdonald played for Northland and his brother was a Canterbury Colt.

Macdonald signed for Glasgow Warriors for the season 2012–13 in a two-year deal. While with the provincial Glasgow club he was affiliated to Aberdeen GSFP RFC. He retired from rugby union due to a neck injury in February 2013. He played 4 games for the Pro12 club.
