= Saimone Taumoepeau =

NZ international rugby union player

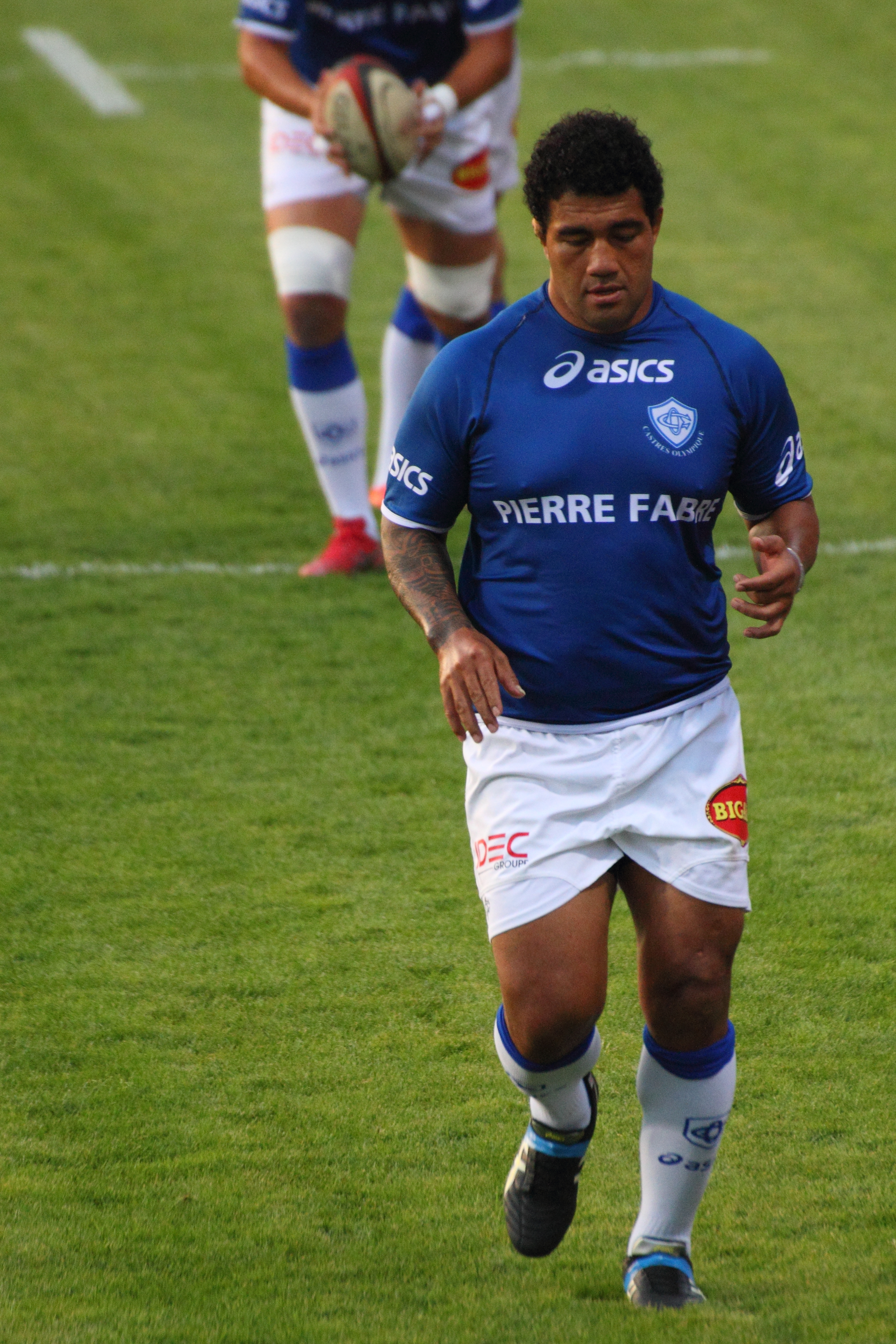
- Born: 21 December 1979 (age 46) Ha'apai, Tonga
- Height: 1.86 m (6 ft 1 in)
- Weight: 111 kg (17 st 7 lb)
- School: Tupou College Tonga
- Notable relative: Tevita Taumoepeau (brother)

Rugby union career
- Position: Prop Hooker
Amateur team(s)
Years	Team	Apps	(Points)
- Auckland Marist
- Correct as of 1 Sept 2006
Senior career
Years	Team	Apps	(Points)
2007-2011	RC Toulonnais	101	(40)
2011-2016	Castres Olympique	96	(35)
2016	CA Brive	2	(0)
2016-	AS Lavaur	47	(10)
- Correct as of 2 November 2018
Provincial / State sides
Years	Team	Apps	(Points)
2004-2007	Auckland	32	(20)
- Correct as of 9 September 2006
Super Rugby
Years	Team	Apps	(Points)
2005-2007	Blues	23	(5)
- Correct as of 9 September 2006
International career
Years	Team	Apps	(Points)
2004-2005	New Zealand	3	(5)
- Correct as of 1 Sept 2006

Saimone Taumoepeau (born 21 December 1979 in Ha'apai, Tonga) is a professional rugby union player in France. He is the younger brother of Tevita Taumoepeau.

== Career ==
Born in Tonga, Taumoepeau emigrated to New Zealand in 1997. Taumoepeau was a shock selection in the 2004 end-of-year All Blacks squad after having only made his debut that season in provincial rugby's Air New Zealand Cup and having yet to play Super Rugby. He first made his name as a loosehead prop, but made his debut as a hooker for the Junior All Blacks. He played his rugby for Auckland at provincial level and the Blues at Super 14 level before moving to French club Toulon.

While considered to be on the smaller side of the scale compared to most international props in terms of physical size, Taumoepeau has made a reputation for being a devastating scrummager via technique and brute strength. He also proved to be a reliable hooker for both Auckland, the Blues and at Junior All Blacks level.

Taumoepeau signed with Toulon in 2007, having joined them after that year's New Zealand season and won the French Pro D2 Championship 2007–2008. He played for Castres Olympique between 2011 and 2016, and won the French top 14 Championship in 2012–13.

== Honours ==
=== Club ===
(France) Castres

- Top 14: 2012–13
