= Mike Umaga =

Samoa international rugby union & league player

- Born: Michael Umaga; 19 February 1966 (age 60) Auckland, New Zealand
- Height: 1.83 m (6 ft 0 in)
- Weight: 100 kg (15 st 10 lb)
- Notable relative(s): Tana Umaga (brother); Jacob Umaga (son); Caylen Umaga (son); Peter Umaga-Jensen (Nephew); Thomas Umaga-Jensen (nephew); Jerry Collins (cousin)

Rugby union career
- Position(s): Fullback, Wing, Centre
Senior career
Years	Team	Apps	(Points)
1997-04	Rotherham	31	(149)
International career
Years	Team	Apps	(Points)
1995-99	Samoa	13	(13)
Coaching career
- Years: Team
- 2004-06: Coventry R.F.C.
- 2008-09: Spain (assistant)
- –: Nuneaton R.F.C.
- 2012-: Stourbridge Saxons
- Rugby league career

Playing information
- Position: Fullback
Club
Years	Team	Pld	T	G	FG	P
1995–97	Halifax RLFC

Mike Umaga (born 19 February 1966) is a former Samoa international rugby union and rugby league footballer.

== Background ==
Umaga was born in Auckland, New Zealand. He is the brother of New Zealand former rugby union Captain Tana Umaga. He played against his brother Tana Umaga on one occasion losing 13 - 71.

== Career ==
Umaga moved to England in 1995 and played two seasons of rugby league with Halifax. However, shortly after rugby union turned professional, he switched codes, joining Rotherham in 1997 as player-coach.

He made his on-field début on 17 January 1998, and in six seasons with the club played 133 games (started 130), scoring 38 tries, 85 conversions & 69 penalties for a total of 567 points. He jointly holds the club record for most conversions in a single match (10 v Waterloo on 11 March 2000) He played his last game for Rotherham on 8 May 2004 against Newcastle Falcons. Umaga scored one try in the 20–26 loss, which was the final game of the Gallagher Premiership 2003/2004 season. Rotherham were relegated, without winning a single match in the campaign.

In July 2004, Umaga signed with Coventry R.F.C., initially as the backs coach, becoming the assistant coach in September 2004 and the head coach in April 2005. However, his time there ended in controversy when he was suspended by the club for unspecified "serious allegations" on 14 November 2006. He resigned less than two weeks later. He subsequently launched a case at against Coventry RFC at an employment tribunal for breach of contract and constructive unfair dismissal. In 2007, the tribunal found in his favour and awarded him £38,000.

Following his departure from this post, he signed as player-coach for local team Kenilworth R.F.C., making his début on 13 January 2007 in a 20–6 away victory against Camp Hill in Midlands Division 2 (West). He played in only six games, but coached the team to promotion into Midlands Division 1 for the 2007/2008 season.

Umaga was the new head coach of Nuneaton R.F.C., losing his first match in charge, a pre-season friendly against Newbury, by a score of 22–37. He also used to coach rugby at Warwick School, training the backs of the 1st XV. As well as being coach of the University of Birmingham, he is also the coach at Stourbridge RFC in National division two. Umaga and the team were on the verge of promotion when a last gasp try by Worthing, who won the game 28–26.
