= Santiago Sanz (rugby union) =

Argentine rugby union player (born 1979)

- Born: 27 June 1979 (age 47) Buenos Aires, Argentina
- Height: 6 ft 3 in (191 cm)
- Weight: 208 lb (94 kg)

Rugby union career
- Position: Flanker
Senior career
Years	Team	Apps	(Points)
- Club Atlético San Isidro
International career
Years	Team	Apps	(Points)
2003–2007	Argentina	6	(5)
National sevens team
Years	Team		Comps
- Argentina

Santiago Sanz (born 27 June 1979) is an Argentine former professional rugby union player who played as a flanker. Born in Buenos Aires, he played for Club Atlético San Isidro, and also earned six caps for the Argentina national team. He also played 55 times for the Argentina sevens team, scoring 13 tries and a conversion for a total of 67 points.
