= Chris Jack =

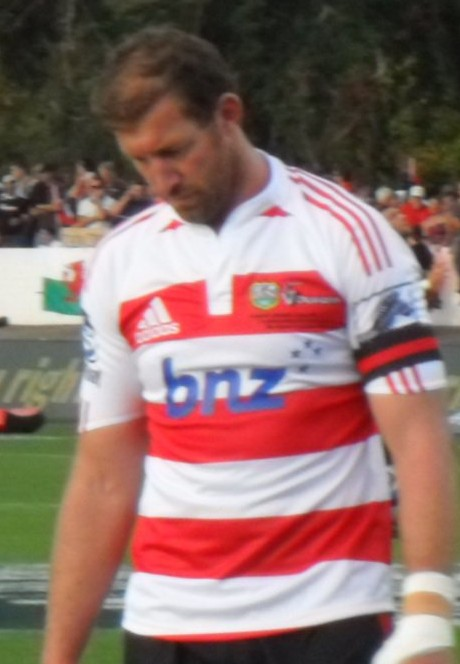
- Born: Christopher Raymond Jack; 5 September 1978 (age 48) Christchurch, New Zealand
- Height: 2.02 m (6 ft 7 1/2 in)
- Weight: 112 kg (17 st 9 lb)
- School: Shirley Boys' High School
- Notable relative(s): Graham Jack (brother); Liam Jack (nephew)

Rugby union career
- Position: Lock
Senior career
Years	Team	Apps	(Points)
2007–09	Saracens	34	(10)
2012	Kyuden Voltex	9	(0)
Provincial / State sides
Years	Team	Apps	(Points)
1999–2005	Canterbury	40	
2006–07	Tasman	5	
2009	Western Province	1	(5)
2010	Tasman	12	(15)
- Correct as of 15 July 2014
Super Rugby
Years	Team	Apps	(Points)
1999–07	Crusaders	98	(35)
2010–11	Crusaders	12	(0)
- Correct as of 22 August 2013
International career
Years	Team	Apps	(Points)
2001–07	New Zealand	67	(25)
- Correct as of 25 March 2008

Christopher Raymond Jack (born 5 September 1978) is a former New Zealand rugby union player who played as a lock. He played for Canterbury and the Tasman Mako in the National Provincial Championship and its successor, the Air New Zealand Cup; the Crusaders in Super Rugby; Saracens in the Guinness Premiership; and internationally for the New Zealand national team, the All Blacks.

== Rugby career ==
His test debut for the All Blacks was against Argentina on 23 June 2001 in Christchurch. With his size and athleticism, he established himself as a regular in the All Blacks side.

It was announced on 7 June 2006 that Jack had signed a two-year contract with the newly formed Tasman Rugby Union. He spent two years with the English Premiership side Saracens joining after the 2007 Rugby World Cup, joining another New Zealand player, Glen Jackson.

In April 2009 he re-signed with the New Zealand Rugby Union until 2011. He played with South African side Western Province and then made a return to Super 14 side Crusaders for the 2010 season.

== Current life ==
Retiring in 2015, Jack has taken up a builders apprenticeship. Based in Nelson, Jack has also taken up the position as the Nelson Child Cancer Foundation ambassador. His father is also involved in the building industry.

== Achievements ==
In 2002, Jack was named the New Zealand Rugby Player of the Year.

== Other ==
- Scored a try 11 minutes after coming on as a replacement against Argentina on his international debut in 2001.
- Scored a try in New Zealand’s opening match of the RWC 2007 against Italy.
- Played in six RWC matches, five in 2003 and one in 2007.
