= Tana Umaga =

New Zealand international rugby union & league player (born 1973)

Faʻalogo Tana Umaga ONZM
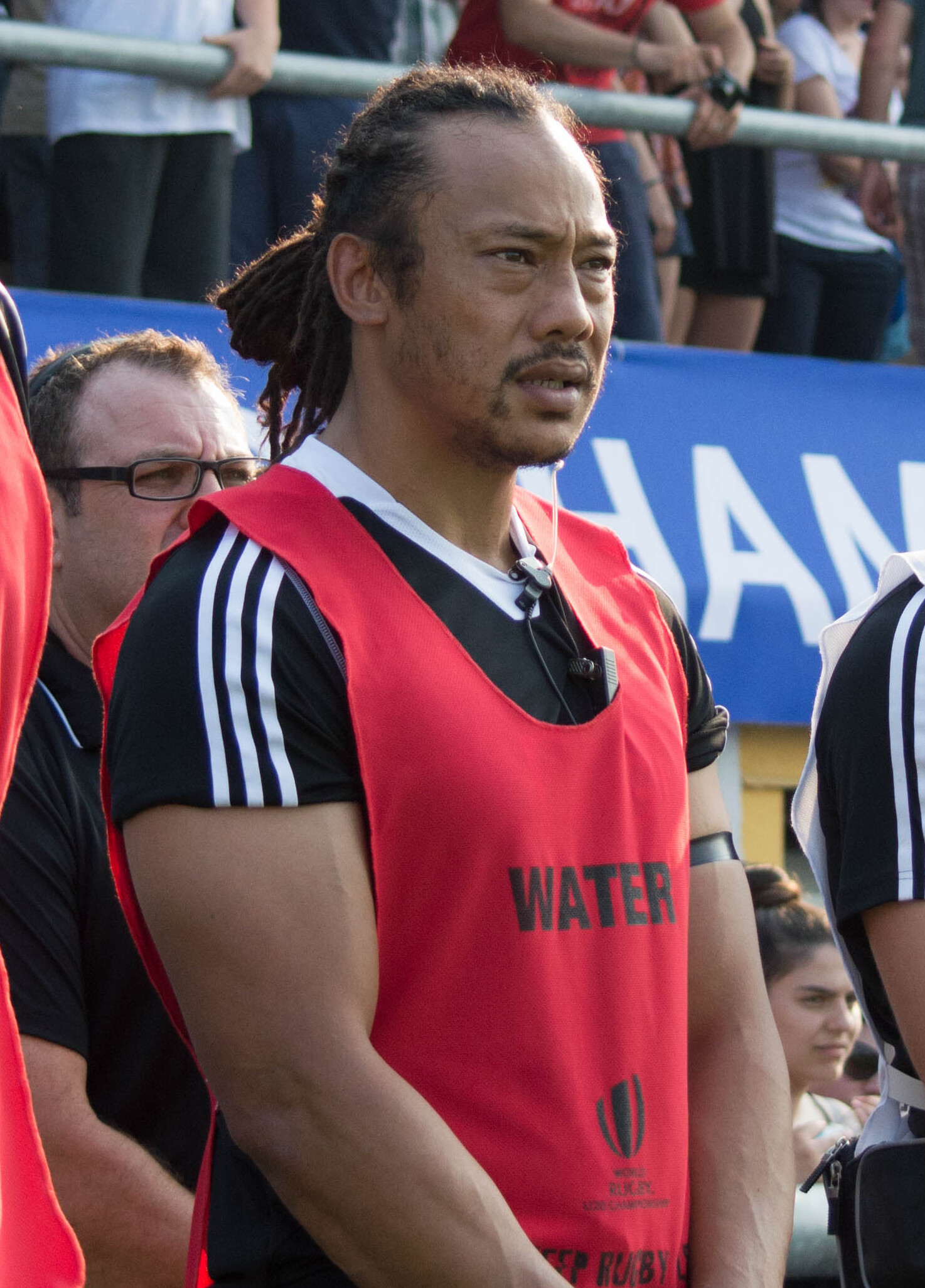
- Umaga with New Zealand U20s in 2015
- Born: Jonathan Falefasa Umaga; 27 May 1973 (age 53) Lower Hutt, New Zealand
- Height: 1.87 m (6 ft 2 in)
- Weight: 100 kg (220 lb)
- School: Parkway College
- Notable relative(s): Mike Umaga (brother); Jerry Collins (cousin); Jacob Umaga (nephew); Peter Umaga-Jensen (nephew); Thomas Umaga-Jensen (nephew); Tu Umaga-Marshall (nephew)

Rugby union career
- Position(s): Centre, wing
Senior career
Years	Team	Apps	(Points)
1994–2005	Petone Rugby Club		
2005–2006	Toulon	7	(10)
Provincial / State sides
Years	Team	Apps	(Points)
1994–2007	Wellington	100	(260)
2010	Counties Manukau	10	(5)
Super Rugby
Years	Team	Apps	(Points)
1996–2007	Hurricanes	122	(235)
2011	Chiefs	7	(5)
International career
Years	Team	Apps	(Points)
1997–2005	New Zealand	74	(180)
Coaching career
- Years: Team
- 2008–2009: Toulon
- 2010–2011: Counties Manukau (assistant)
- 2012–2015: Counties Manukau
- 2015: New Zealand U20 (assistant)
- 2016–2018: Blues (Head Coach)
- 2021–2023: Samoa (assistant)
- 2023–2026: Moana Pasifika
- Rugby league career

Playing information
- Position: Centre
Club
Years	Team	Pld	T	G	FG	P
1991–92	Wainuiomata Lions
1993–94	Newcastle Knights
	Total	0	0	0	0	0
Representative
Years	Team	Pld	T	G	FG	P
1992	Wellington

Jonathan Ionatana Falefasa Umaga ONZM (/ˈtɑːnə ˈuːmʌŋə/; Samoan pronunciation: [ˈtana ˈuːmaŋa]; born 27 May 1973) is a New Zealand rugby union coach and former player and captain of the New Zealand national team, the All Blacks. He is the former head coach of Moana Pasifika in the Super Rugby competition, and current defence coach for the All Blacks. He was granted and uses the Samoan chiefly honorific title of Faʻalogo, meaning "the listener".

He played for the Hurricanes from Super 12's inception in 1996 and took over the captaincy in 2003. Graham Henry named him as All Blacks captain in 2004; under his leadership the All Blacks won 19 of their 22 games including a clean sweep of the British & Irish Lions and a Grand Slam tour in 2005. At the end of 2005, Umaga retired from international rugby after 74 Test caps and 36 tries. Umaga played four games in 2007 for the Wellington Lions in the Air New Zealand Cup, to play 100 matches for the province, before taking up the position of coach at Toulon.

During his first season coaching in 2008–09 season Toulon was a poor performer in the first half of the season and facing a relegation scare, and there was speculation that he would be replaced by Philippe Saint-André. Umaga returned to a playing role for Toulon in the second half of that season, and at the same time announced that he would not continue as head coach beyond that season. After helping Toulon exit relegation trouble (they ultimately finished ninth that season), he retired as a player, and remained at Toulon as assistant coach for backs under Saint-André. In March 2010, Umaga again returned as a player following a serious hip injury to Christian Loamanu. Umaga returned to New Zealand after the 2009–10 French season to become a player-coach with Counties Manukau and played with the Waikato Chiefs in the 2011 Super Rugby competition.

== Early life ==
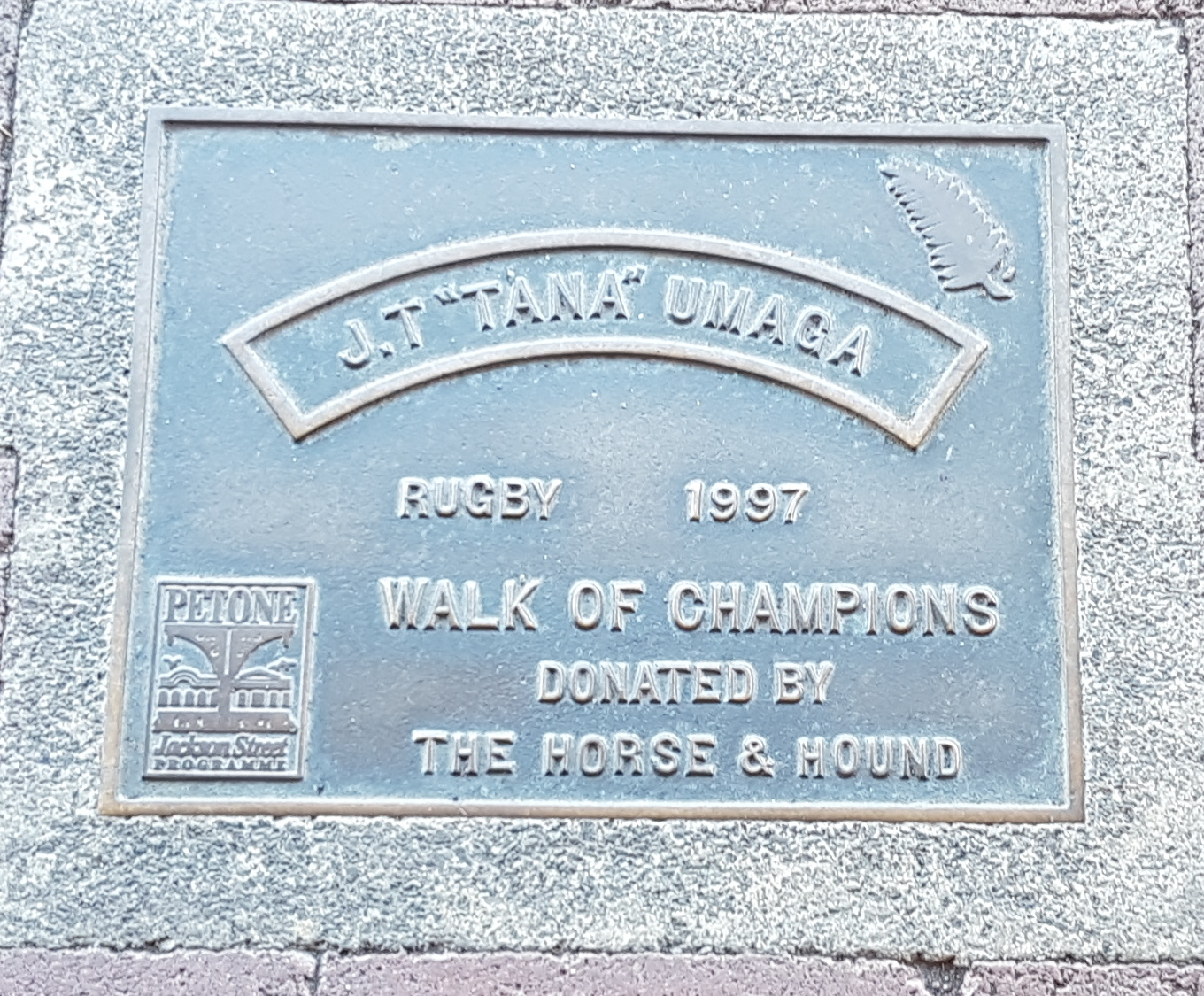
Umaga plaque in Jackson Street, Petone

Umaga was born in Lower Hutt, Wellington, New Zealand. He was born to Samoan immigrant parents, and grew up playing rugby league. Umaga originally aspired to play football in childhood, before being persuaded by his father to play rugby instead. Umaga played for the Wainuiomata Lions and rose through the ranks, making the Wellington U-16 and U-17 sides, and was eventually named in the Junior Kiwi side of 1991.The side also featured future National Rugby League stars Joe Vagana, Ruben Wiki and Gene Ngamu. That same year he signed with the Newcastle Knights but within three weeks was back on the plane to New Zealand because of homesickness. He never played a first-grade NSWRL Premiership game. In 1993 Umaga's brother Mike, who played rugby union for Manu Samoa, persuaded him to take up rugby union in 1994. The brothers played on opposite teams in a Test match between Samoa and New Zealand in 1999 during which Tana scored two tries; the All Blacks won 71–13.

== Rugby union career ==
=== 1994–1999 ===
Umaga played wing for the Wellington Lions in 1994 and quickly became a fixture in the starting line-up alongside his brother who also played on the wing. Umaga scored more tries than any other player within the team for three successive years, and in 1996 was selected for the original Hurricanes squad. He also played for Italian team Viadana Rugby in the 1994–1995 Italian season. In his second season playing for the Hurricanes he scored a New Zealand record of 12 tries (now broken by Rico Gear) and earned a call up to the national team at the expense of an ill Jonah Lomu. He scored a try in his debut test match. With Lomu regaining his fitness, coupled with a drop in form, Umaga was dropped from the All Blacks until the 1999 season. To accommodate outside backs Umaga, Lomu, Jeff Wilson and Christian Cullen, All Black coach John Hart moved fullback Cullen into the midfield.

=== 2000 and 2001 ===
With a new coach in Wayne Smith Tana Umaga became the regular wing in the All Blacks line-up. Worries about the shape of the team were swept aside when the team smashed Tonga 102–0, in a game where debutantes Troy Flavell and Doug Howlett starred. He also played in the first Bledisloe Cup match in 2000, dubbed "the game of the century", scoring an early try. He signed a new four-year contract with the NZRU, and when Alama Ieremia took up a contract in Japan, Umaga decided to shift his focus to centre, despite scoring 9 tries in 7 tests on the wing that year. After having played just one match at centre for the Hurricanes, Umaga slotted into the midfield for the All Blacks against France, the team that beat the All Blacks in the semi-final of the World cup the previous year. Umaga had a strong game in a victory. The 2000 season was one of Umaga's best, with him being awarded the Kelvin Tremain Memorial Trophy for New Zealand rugby player of the year. While the Smith era introduced a number of new players into the New Zealand team, they could not reclaim the Tri Nations or Bledisloe Cup in 2000 or 2001. This led to his sacking and the hiring of former All Black mid-week player and successful Chiefs coach John Mitchell.

=== 2002 and 2003 ===
Moving Umaga to the centres was not to everyone's liking claim this as a reason for his loss of pace. Despite this Umaga was named as captain of the Wellington Lions and vice captain of the All Blacks under Anton Oliver in John Mitchell's first squad. Early on, John Mitchell and assistant coach Robbie Deans favoured Crusader Mark Robinson in the midfield. The squad to play against Italy and Ireland as well as compete in the Tri Nations did not feature Umaga. Despite news reports about him carrying a knee injury, on the day when the All Blacks were to take on Italy, Umaga played for his club Petone.

Umaga, along with Taine Randell the All Blacks 1999 world cup captain, were asked to play for the New Zealand Barbarians against the New Zealand Māori. Randell himself was Māori and did not wish to play against them, and Umaga was placed on the wing, a position he stated he didn't want to play. After the game Umaga received a call-up to the national team to play Fiji, but injured his knee mid game. Umaga told the coaches he was fit for selection for the Bledisloe match tie against Australia but was again no selected, Daryl Gibson taking the spot on the bench. Umaga again turned out for Petone.

Umaga came off the bench against South Africa at his home ground Westpac Stadium. Umaga would go on to make the Tri-Nations XV; a team based on Zurich world player rankings. Many considered him a good chance to take over the captaincy on the end of year tour from injured regular captain Reuben Thorne, but that role was instead handed to Taine Randell. Umaga was to lead the Hurricanes in 2003, taking over from Gordon Slater, under coach Colin Cooper. The Hurricanes made the semi-finals for just the second time in their history after winning a team record seven times in a row, shedding the inconsistent tag that had plagued them since the competition's inception. His form was recognised and he was rewarded with a spot in the All Blacks, named as vice-captain under Reuben Thorne who would lead the team to the World Cup.

In a test match against Wales on 21 June 2003, Welsh captain Colin Charvis was knocked out in a tackle from All Blacks forward Jerry Collins. Umaga stopped playing despite his team being in an attacking position; to check that Charvis had not swallowed his mouthguard. He placed him in the recovery position and for this act, the Council of the International Fair Play Committee awarded Umaga the Pierre de Coubertin World Trophy for outstanding sportsmanship. Umaga was the first New Zealander to receive the award. The Welsh Rugby Union also presented him with a figurine to honour the display of sportsmanship.

The All Blacks defeated the Springboks 52–16 and the Wallabies 50–21 away from home in consecutive weeks. New Zealand won both home matches as well, claiming the Tri Nations title and the Bledisloe Cup. This was the first time the All Blacks had won the Bledisloe since 1997. The performance had them regarded as early favourites to win the years World Cup, along with the eventual winners England.

The opening match of the tournament was to be the All Black last Rugby World Cup appearance. In an attempted back line move, Umaga collided with star Five-Eighth Carlos Spencer. Spencer came out unhurt but unfortunately Umaga suffered a damaged posterior cruciate ligament in his left knee and was forced to leave the field. Umaga would not be play again in the tournament despite being declared fit to play in the semi-final by then All Blacks doctor John Mayhew. Leon MacDonald the regular backup Fullback, was preferred in the centre spot. The All Blacks would lose the game to Australia 22–10 and again fail to reach the final.

The aftermath of the world cup was similar to the last, as coach John Mitchell was dropped. Only two coaches applied for the position of All Blacks head coach, Mitchell who re-applied and Graham Henry. Graham Henry was the former coach of the Blues and was told he would never receive the top job after leaving New Zealand shores to take up a contract with the Wales national team. Henry's experience in New Zealand and overseas, as well as the skill shown in turning around the Welsh team worked in his favour and he secured the job.

=== All Black captain: 2004 and 2005 ===
Graham Henry's first choice as captain of his team was Umaga, and after a disappointing Super 12, in which the Hurricanes came 11th, was selected to replace Reuben Thorne. He was the first New Zealander of Pacific Island heritage to captain the All Blacks in a test match. Umaga's captaincy began well, with victory in the first six tests, including two victories against World Cup holders England. One of them, a 36–3 win at Carisbrook in Dunedin, was at the time the heaviest loss ever by the team that won the most recent Rugby World Cup. The All Blacks of 2004 successfully managed to regain the Bledisloe Cup. The winning run came to an end, when the All Blacks lost in both away games against Australia and South Africa, putting the All Blacks out of contention for the 2004 Tri Nations series. In Paris in 2004 Umaga became the first New Zealand rugby player of non-Maori descent to lead the Haka, thus making him the Prematch Haka leader.

In the 2004 end-of-year tour he oversaw the 45–6 victory over France. Umaga also celebrated his 100th match for the Hurricanes, when his team overcame the Blues. They made the semi-final for the second time in three years, but again stumbled to a loss to the champion Crusaders. In 2005 the British & Irish Lions toured, on top of the Tri Nations and the potential Grand Slam tour of England, Scotland, Wales and Ireland.

Umaga was involved in an incident in the first Test of the Lions' tour on 25 June 2005 that caused friction between the Lions and the All Blacks. Early in the Test, Umaga and hooker Keven Mealamu upended Lions captain Brian O'Driscoll in a post-ruck clean-out. O'Driscoll required surgery on a dislocated shoulder and missed the rest of the tour. The British and Irish media accused Umaga of foul play. O'Driscoll and Lions management characterised the incident as a "deliberate spear tackle". The independent citing commissioner found that neither Umaga nor Mealamu had a case to answer at the time due to inconclusive evidence, but after viewing new amateur footage of the incident, Greg Thomas, communications manager for the sport's governing body, the International Rugby Board (IRB), described the incident as "unacceptably dangerous" and stated that IRB was instructing referees to suspend players for three to six months for such offences. Daily Telegraph London journalist Brendan Gallagher labelled it as one of the fifty 'ugliest moments' in sports. In August 2014 Brian O'Driscoll renewed his rivalry with Tana Umaga when he completed the ALS ice bucket challenge and immediately nominated the Umaga. New Zealand was undefeated during the Lions tour and won the Tri-Nations, which included the retention of the Bledisloe Cup. The IRB shortlisted Umaga for their 2005 International Player of the Year award (an honour eventually won by fellow All Black Dan Carter). Umaga also led the All Blacks to their second Northern Hemisphere Grand Slam. After playing 74 test matches for his country, Umaga confirmed his retirement from international rugby at a press conference on 10 January 2006. His main reason for retiring was to spend more time with his family as he had just had another child with his wife Rochelle. Umaga's announcement led to Richie McCaw succeeding him as captain. Umaga gave the All Blacks shirt he wore in his final game to Sonny Bill Williams, who stated afterwards: "Just getting that jersey gave me butterflies. Hopefully one day I can put on the real thing."

=== 2006 and 2007 ===
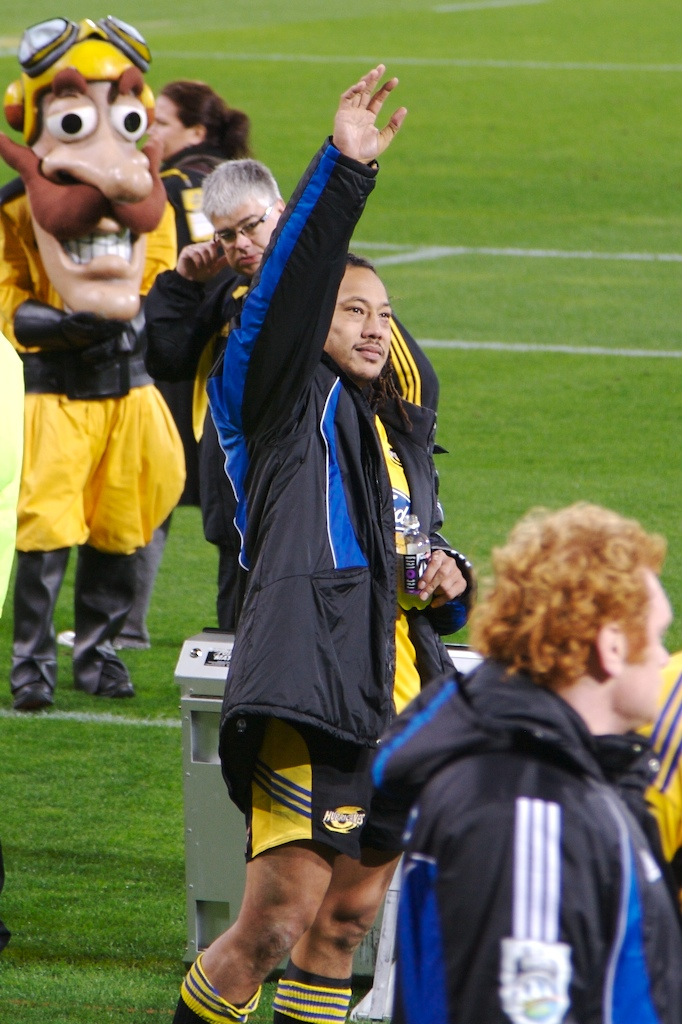
Tana Umaga waving goodbye to fans during his last match

For the 2006 Super 14 season Umaga handed the Hurricanes captaincy to All Black number eight Rodney So'oialo to focus on his own game. The Hurricanes reached the semi-finals for the third time in four years. Out drinking after the 2006 Super 14 Final – in which the Hurricanes lost to the Crusaders – Umaga was seen in a bar hitting teammate Chris Masoe with a woman's handbag, breaking her cell phone, after Masoe allegedly attempted to strike another patron. Umaga replaced the woman's damaged cell phone, and the woman went on to sell her handbag and broken cell phone for NZD23,000 on the New Zealand internet auction site Trade Me. In the 2006 Queen's Birthday Honours, Umaga was appointed an Officer of the New Zealand Order of Merit, for services to rugby.

In the months to come he was reported to be on the wish lists of many top European clubs; his former All Black's teammate Andrew Mehrtens was forced to publicly deny rumours that Umaga was a target of his club at the time – Harlequins. Umaga eventually signed for French club Toulon that had been recently relegated from the Top 14 to Pro D2. His contract allowed him to play the entire 2006 Air New Zealand Cup (ANZ Cup) season for Wellington before travelling to France. He ended up playing only seven matches for Toulon as Wellington made the ANZ Cup final. He nonetheless made roughly €350,000 (US$438,000/GBP 250,000) that Toulon's co-presidents reportedly paid out of their own pockets. The day before playing his first match for Toulon he was awarded the medal of honour of the city of Toulon (médaille d'or de la ville) by Mayor Hubert Falco. On 29 October 2006, Umaga started in his first game three days after arriving in Toulon scoring his team's only try in a 22–16 victory against Lyon. He was surprised to see how close to the players the fans were and how noisy the atmosphere was.

Umaga returned to New Zealand at the end of his contract with Toulon following their 7 January 2007 win over Grenoble. When Umaga arrived in Toulon they were ninth in the Pro D2 table; when he left they had risen to third. Toulon won eight of nine matches with Umaga on the roster – the only loss coming when he was out injured. Umaga played his last season for the Hurricanes in 2007. His last match for them was on 5 May 2007 at Wellington's Westpac Stadium. On 25 September 2007, Umaga released a book detailing his career.

=== 2011 return ===
Umaga was named in the Chiefs' starting line-up for their opening Super Rugby fixture of the 2011 season to face the ACT Brumbies. This signalled his first Super rugby game since he was a Wellington Hurricanes regular in 2007. After playing 7 games he officially retired as a player at the end of 2011 ITM cup season.

Umaga was the first to lead the team with the newer Kapa o pango version of the haka in 2005 against South Africa.

== Coaching ==
During the 2008/09 Top 14 season, Umaga's coaching future was uncertain because Toulon were struggling at midseason and were in danger of relegation. This led to speculation in January 2009 that he would be replaced as manager by Philippe Saint-André. This was confirmed on 27 January 2009, with Umaga taking on the role as player/manager at the age of 35, and at the same time announcing he would not return as head coach for the following season. A late-season return to form eventually brought Toulon to mid-table safety in ninth place. Saint-André took on the managing role effective at the beginning of the 2009/10 season, but kept Umaga on as Toulon's backs coach. On Friday, 12 March 2010, Counties Manukau announced that Umaga had signed for the province as a player coach for the Air New Zealand Cup. Counties competed well, with two hard-fought Ranfurly Shield challenges and a peak of second on the points table. Counties ended the season in ninth.

Umaga was widely tipped to sign on as head of the Blues franchise for the 2016 Super Rugby competition, following the resignation of Sir John Kirwan from this role in June 2015.

It was confirmed on 23 June 2015 that Umaga would take over as head coach of The Blues at the end of the 2015 ITM Cup Season. Umaga held the position of Head Coach between 2016 and 2018, when he was replaced by Leon MacDonald, but would remain as part of a stable coaching set up as Defence coach.

It was announced on 9 June 2023, that Umaga would take over as the head coach of the Moana Pasifika rugby team for the 2024 Super Rugby Pacific season after the departure of previous head coach Aaron Mauger.

In 2025, Umaga was inducted into the Pasifika Rugby Hall of Fame.

== Family ==
Umaga's brother Mike has represented Samoa at both rugby union and rugby league. Their cousin Jerry Collins was also an All Black. Nephews Peter and Thomas Umaga-Jensen have also represented Wellington at rugby at senior level. Romanian international Jack Umaga and Samoan international Sinoti Sinoti are also close relatives of Umaga.

Umaga is married to Rochelle; the couple have four children together.

== Personal life ==
After retiring from professional rugby, Umaga began training Brazilian Jiu Jitsu. In 2022 he earned a silver medal as a brown belt at the IBJJF Masters Worlds competition. Shortly after this achievement, Umaga was promoted to black belt in the sport by his coaches at Alliance Jiu-Jitsu in Auckland, New Zealand.

Umaga has an aviation waypoint named in his honour. UMAGA is a waypoint located south 10 nautical miles south of Wellington Airport's Runway 34. It is the Initial Approach Fix for most approaches into Runway 34. The exact coordinates are 174° 47' 43.12" E 41° 29' 54.63" S.

== Bibliography ==
- Matheson, John (2006). Tana Umaga – A Tribute to a Rugby Legend. Celebrity Books. ISBN 1-877252-29-8.

Sporting positions
Preceded by Reuben Thorne	All Blacks Captain; 2004–2005	Succeeded by Richie McCaw
Awards
Preceded by Don Rowlands	Leadership Award; 2006	Succeeded by John Graham
