= Neemia Tialata =

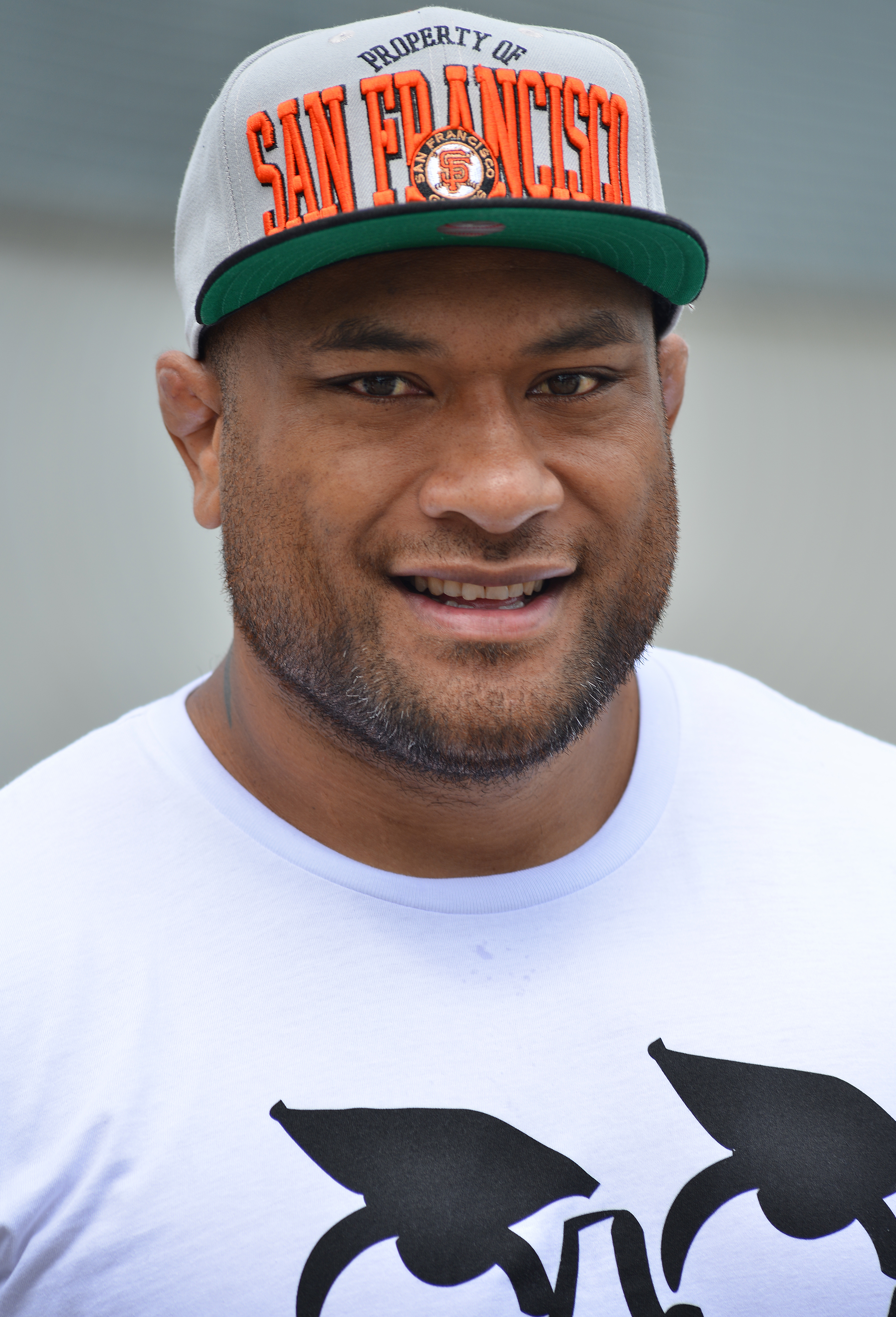
- Born: Neemia Stanley Tialata; 15 July 1982 (age 44) Wainuiomata, New Zealand
- Height: 1.87 m (6 ft 2 in)
- Weight: 136 kg (300 lb)
- School: Wellington College, Parkway College

Rugby union career
- Position: Prop
Senior career
Years	Team	Apps	(Points)
2011-2014	Bayonne	75	(0)
2014-2016	Toulouse	27	(0)
2016-2018	Narbonne	17	(0)
Provincial / State sides
Years	Team	Apps	(Points)
2003–2010	Wellington	65	(25)
Super Rugby
Years	Team	Apps	(Points)
2004–2011	Hurricanes	101	(15)
International career
Years	Team	Apps	(Points)
2005–2010	New Zealand	43	(10)

Neemia Stanley Tialata (born 15 July 1982 in Lower Hutt, New Zealand) is a New Zealand former rugby union footballer. He most recently played for RC Narbonne in the Pro D2. Tialata also previously played for Stade Toulousain in the Top 14. As well as representing New Zealand All Blacks from 2005 to 2010, he also played for the Hurricanes in Super Rugby and for Wellington in the ITM/Air New Zealand Cup when available. Currently, Neemia serves as the Director of Rugby at Wellington College in Wellington, New Zealand - along with his former All Black teammate Piri Weepu, who serves as the Wellington College 1st XV head coach.

== Early life ==
Tialata was born in Lower Hutt but moved, when he was one, to American Samoa with his parents who were undergoing religious training in Kanana Fou Theological Seminary. The family returned to their vocation in New Zealand when Tialata was five with his late mother Sipoutasi, late father Rev. Pelema and sisters. He was the only boy and was the third child out of the four.

His father died after a year of serving at the CCCAS church in Porirua, New Zealand followed by his mother four years after. Tialata and his three sisters now reside with his aunt whom he now calls his mother (Nu'ulopa) and her five children whom Tialata also now considers his brothers and sisters.

== Career ==
Tialata debuted for Wellington in 2003 and was selected for the Hurricanes in 2004. Tialata thrust himself into the All Blacks selection frame as a young prop with his strong play throughout the 2005 season and made his Test debut in the first match of the All Blacks Home Nations tour – against Wales – in November that year. He was dropped from the 2010 Tri Nations squad due to poor form. In 2011, after 8 seasons with the Hurricanes, he signed with Top 14 side Aviron Bayonnais. Formerly a loosehead prop, Tialata now concentrates his efforts on the tighthead side of the scrum but retains the valuable ability to cover both sides
