= James Ryan (rugby union, born 1983) =

- Born: James Andrew Cheyne Ryan; 10 February 1983 (age 43) Christchurch, New Zealand
- Height: 2 m (6 ft 7 in)
- Weight: 124 kg (273 lb)
- Occupation: Lawyer

Rugby union career
- Position: Lock
Provincial / State sides
Years	Team	Apps	(Points)
2002–2006	Otago	19	
Super Rugby
Years	Team	Apps	(Points)
2005–2007	Highlanders	27	
International career
Years	Team	Apps	(Points)
2005–2006	New Zealand	9	(0)
2004	New Zealand under 21s		

James Andrew Cheyne Ryan (born 10 February 1983) is a former New Zealand rugby union player. His position was lock.

Ryan was born in Christchurch, New Zealand, and attended Christ's College where he was a significant player in the school's First XV for three years. He later attended Knox College at the University of Otago where he embarked upon Bachelor of Laws and Bachelor of Commerce degrees.

== Career ==
Ryan played for the Highlanders in Super Rugby and for Otago in the National Provincial Championship.

He made his All Black debut age 22, versus Fiji in 2005. He went on to play 9 further test matches for the national side.

Ryan was also a part of the New Zealand under 21 team in 2004.

In 2005 Ryan was labelled by former All Black coach Laurie Mains as "potentially one of the great All Black locks". He was sidelined in April 2007 with a serious knee injury. Ryan had 3 operations in the space of 12 months and announced the termination of his contract with the Otago Rugby Union in March 2008 and confirmed he was taking an indefinite break from rugby.
