= Jerry Collins =

New Zealand rugby union footballer

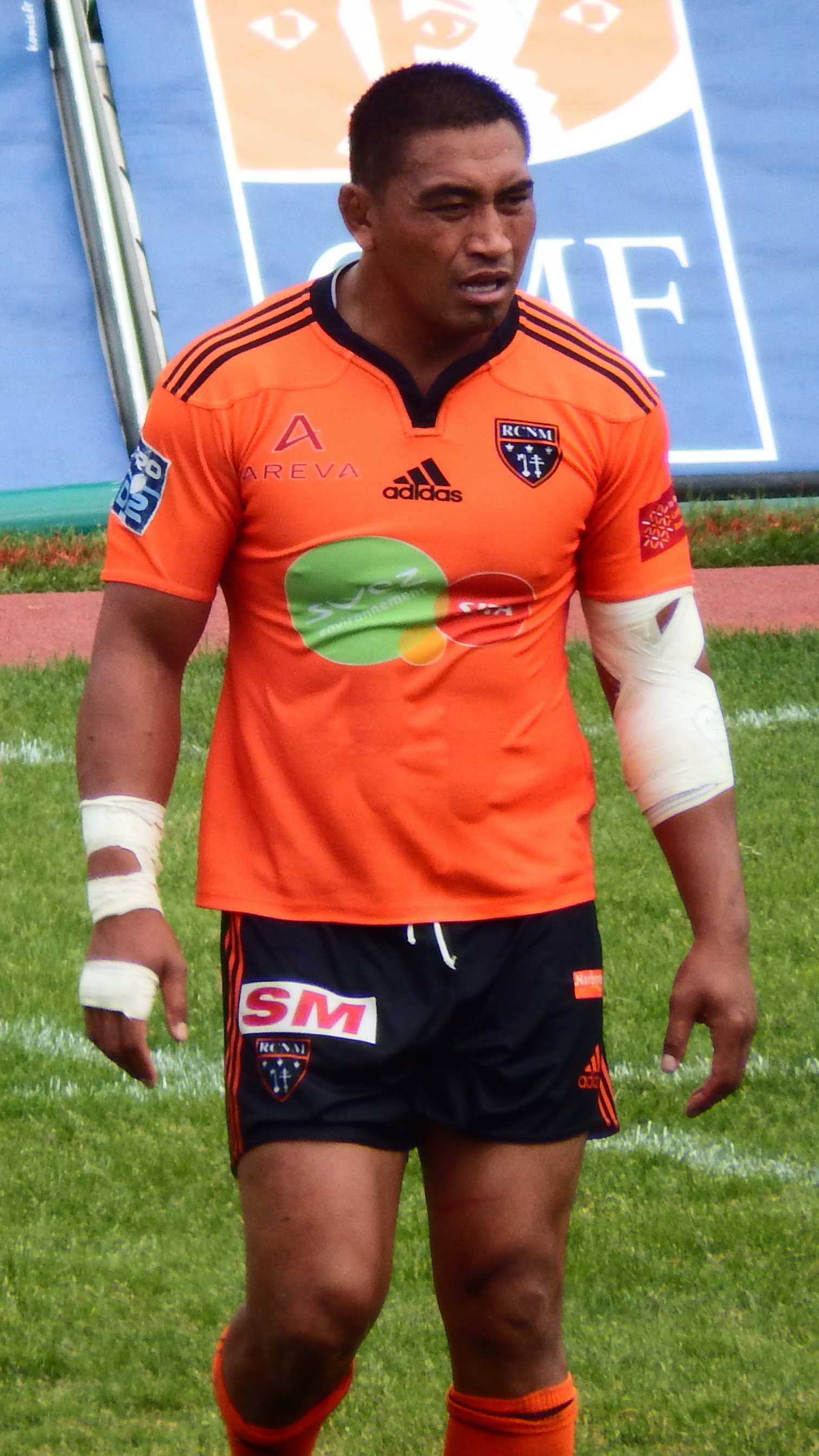
- Collins featuring for RC Narbonne in 2015
- Born: Jerry Collins; 4 November 1980 Apia, Samoa
- Died: 5 June 2015 (aged 34) Béziers, France
- Height: 1.91 m (6 ft 3 in; 75 in)
- Weight: 112 kg (247 lb)
- School: St. Patrick's College
- University: Victoria University of Wellington
- Notable relative(s): Mike Umaga, Tana Umaga, Sinoti Sinoti (cousins)

Rugby union career
- Position(s): Flanker, Number eight
Amateur team(s)
Years	Team	Apps	(Points)
- Northern United, Scunthorpe RUFC
Senior career
Years	Team	Apps	(Points)
2008–2009	Toulon	22	(20)
2009–2011	Ospreys	56	(30)
2011–2013	Yamaha Júbilo	13	(5)
2015	Narbonne	8	(15)
Provincial / State sides
Years	Team	Apps	(Points)
1999–2007	Wellington	47	(55)
Super Rugby
Years	Team	Apps	(Points)
2001–2008	Hurricanes	85	(27)
International career
Years	Team	Apps	(Points)
1998–1999	New Zealand U19		
2001–2007	New Zealand	48	(25)
Medal record
Men's Rugby union
Representing New Zealand
Rugby World Cup
Bronze medal – third place	2003 England	Squad

Jerry Collins (4 November 1980 – 5 June 2015) was a professional rugby union player. Although he was born in Apia, Samoa, he grew up in New Zealand and played for the New Zealand national team, earning 48 caps. At club level, he played for the Hurricanes Super Rugby franchise in New Zealand, Toulon and Narbonne in the Rugby Pro D2, Ospreys in Wales, and Yamaha Júbilo in Japan. He played as a flanker and number eight, and was considered to be one of the hardest tacklers in the sport.

Collins and his partner, Alana Madill, were killed in a car crash in southern France in June 2015.

== Early career ==
Collins was born in the Samoan capital of Apia, but grew up in Porirua on New Zealand's North Island. He made New Zealand Secondary Schools through his performance in the 1st XV side at St. Patrick's in Wellington for three seasons running in 1996, 1997 and 1998 and was Player of the Tournament at the 1999 World Junior Championships (Under-19) which New Zealand won, before going on to become the first player from that team to be called up to the New Zealand national team (the All Blacks) in 2001.

== Professional career ==
Collins made his Wellington debut in the NPC in 1999, and his Wellington Hurricanes debut in 2001. He made a total of 74 appearances for the Hurricanes between 2001 and 2008, which included an appearance in the 2006 final against the Crusaders at AMI Stadium.

After debuting for the All Blacks in 2001, Collins went on to play 48 test matches, scoring five tries. In June 2006, he captained the All Blacks in a one-off Test match against Argentina, where he led his team to a 25–19 victory in Buenos Aires becoming the 61st captain of the All Blacks. He was named as All Black captain 2007 Rugby World Cup matches against Portugal and Romania, standing in for regular captain Richie McCaw.

Collins retired from international rugby in May 2008. Shortly afterwards, he played in a rugby league match in the Wellington Competition, registered under a different name. The team was fined.

In October 2007, following New Zealand's exit from the 2007 Rugby World Cup, Collins was vacationing in Devon when he was spotted by Barnstaple head coach Kevin Squire who invited him to watch the team play a match at the weekend. Much to the club's surprise Collins turned up so they asked if he minded running a coaching session with the junior section. After doing this Kevin Squire thanked Collins and asked if there was anything they could do to repay him, to which Collins replied he just wanted to play rugby. So the following Saturday Collins turned out for the club's 2nd XV match against local side Newton Abbot. In a match a few weeks later for the Barbarians he wore the Barnstaple socks.

After leaving the Hurricanes, Collins played for Toulon during the 2008–09 season, joining Sonny Bill Williams in the club's aggressive recruitment drive. In May 2009, Collins agreed to a two-year deal to join Welsh team Ospreys. He was Ospreys' Players' Player of the Year in the 09/10 season.

He then played for Yamaha Júbilo in the Top League in Japan, whom he joined at the beginning of the 2011 season. He last played for the classic All Blacks against Fiji in 2013, and he took 2014 off.

In January 2015, Collins signed a contract as a Medical Joker to play in the French ProD2 with Racing Club Narbonne. He was injury cover for Rocky Elsom.

== Personal life ==
Collins was a cousin of former All Blacks captain and Hurricanes teammate Tana Umaga.

In March 2013, Collins was arrested in a Hamamatsu department store after he was spotted carrying a 17-centimetre (6.7 in)-long knife. Friends of his claimed he was carrying it for self-defence after he was threatened. He was tested negative for all illegal substances. A few days after the arrest, Collins said he was "relieved" to have been arrested, as he feared for his life.

== Death ==
Collins and his partner Alana Madill, aged 34, died on the morning of 5 June 2015, after Alana fell asleep at the wheel and lost control of their car and collided with a bus on the A9 autoroute near Béziers in southern France. His three-month-old baby daughter, Ayla, survived, largely due to Collins attempting to take the brunt of the force away from Ayla by enveloping her in his own body, Ayla was then transported to the hospital in Montpellier in critical condition. Ayla spent a month recovering in intensive care at the hospital in Montpellier, including two weeks spent in a coma. In early July, it was announced Ayla would move to Canada with the Madill family, and continue receiving treatment at a Canadian hospital. Porirua Park Stadium was officially renamed Jerry Collins Stadium on 25 March 2016 in his honour.
