= Old Swinford Hospital RFC =

(England) Old Swinford Hospital RFUC
- Location: Stourbridge, England
- Coach: (Northern Ireland) Andrew Coalter (England) Shaun Perry
Team kit

Old Swinford Hospital RFC is the rugby union football club of Old Swinford Hospital School in Stourbridge. The school has been considered as one of the top rugby schools in the country, holding a highly successful playing record and with many players playing at regional level and an increasing number going on to play professionally and internationally.

Rugby at the school starts at Under-12 level and is played in individual year groups until Under-16 level where the players enter the senior rugby system, where there are four senior XV's for players to play in.

The school's 1st XV and U15 teams both compete in the Daily Mail Cup and it is not uncommon for the teams to reach the late stages of the competition, in the 2011/2012 season the 1st XV made it to the final of the U18 cup at Twickenham, unfortunately losing to Dulwich College 15–8. However Swinford scored the only try through Cass Brookes. Also, in the 2016/2017 season the 1XV managed to play at Sixways Stadium, Home of the Worcester Warriors to compete in the Natwest Bowl, which they won 25–13. This has led to a large following by members of the school both past and present. On many occasions a 1st XV match will attract a large proportion of the school community to the sidelines.

== Unusual Matches ==
In the late 1970s a game of rugby was being played on Top Field, which concealed the old World War II air raid shelters, long since closed up. During the game a maul was formed and the roof of the air raid shelter collapsed leading to the pile of players falling through the hole. After that the field was not declared playable until the shelters had been filled and reinforced.

== 1st XV Captains ==
| Dates | Name | Notes |
|---|---|---|
| 1986-1987 | (England) M Evans | |
| 1987-1988 | (England) T Vaughan | |
| 1988-1989 | (England) A Bradley | |
| 1989–1990 | W Coles | |
| 1990-1991 | J Simpson | |
| 1991–1992 | R Greasley | |
| 1992-1993 | G England | |
| 1993-1994 | A Driver | |
| 1994–1995 | J Hyatt | |
| 1995–1996 | (England) B Corfield | |
| 1996-1997 | A Gibson | |
| 1997–1998 | (England) J Shaw | |
| 1998–1999 | D Quinn | |
| 1999–2000 | D Burr | |
| 2000–2001 | T Daplyn | |
| 2001–2002 | A Cambridge | |
| 2002–2003 | R Harding | |
| 2003–2004 | J Pette | |
| 2004-2005 | (England) C Pennell | |
| 2005–2006 | (England) H Southall | |
| 2006–2008 | (England) D Willis | |
| 2008-2009 | (England) S Sutherland | |
| 2009-2010 | (England) A Nixon | |
| 2010-2011 | (England) R Williamson | |
| 2011-2012 | (England) E Taylor | |
| 2012-2013 | (Wales) R Williams | |
| 2013-2014 | (England) H Taylor | |
| 2018-2019 | (England) A Shaw | |
| 2019-2020 | (England) B Meakin | |
| 2020-2021 | (England) N Sinandima | |
| 2021-2022 | (England) W Webb | |
| 2022-2023 | (England) T Miller | |

== Coaches ==
| Dates | Name |
|---|---|
| 1989–2002 | (Wales) Peter Jones |
| 2000-2002 | (Wales) Peter Jones & (England) Nick Tisdale |
| 2002-2008 | (England) Nick Tisdale & (Northern Ireland) Andrew Coalter |
| 2008–2018 | (Northern Ireland) Andrew Coalter & (England) Simon Daws |
| 2008–Present | (Northern Ireland) Andrew Coalter & (England) Shaun Perry |

== Notable players ==
- (England) Richard West
- (England) Joe Shaw
- (England) James Tideswell
- (England) George Robson
- (England) James Collins
- (England) Chris Pennell
- (England) Rhys Crane
- (England) Daniel Willis (Ex Worcester Warriors player. Retired at age 19 due to a knee injury)
- (England) Max Stelling (Worcester Warriors)
- (England) Ed Taylor (Bedford Blues Rugby)
- Sam Smith (England U17, England U18)
- Huw Taylor (England U17, England U18)
- (England) George Trimmer (Ex Nottingham Rugby & Worcester Warriors. Retired aged 21 due to Knee Injury)

== Tours ==
| Year | To | Captain | Won | Drawn | Lost | Points For | Points Against |
|---|---|---|---|---|---|---|---|
| 1991 | Canada | J Simpson | | | | | |
| 1993 | Canada | G England | | | | | |
| 1996 | South Africa | B Corfield | | | | | |
| 1998 | South America | J Shaw | | | | | |
| 2000 | Australia | D Burr | | | | | |
| 2002 | South Africa | A Cambridge | 2 | 0 | 4 | 43 | 114 |
| 2004 | New Zealand and The Cook Islands | J Pette | 3 | 0 | 2 | 110 | 64 |
| 2006 | Australia and Fiji | H Southall | 4 | 0 | 1 | 189 | 20 |
| 2008 | South Africa and Namibia | D Vermont | 5 | 0 | 0 | 207 | 64 |
| 2010 | Australia and Malaysia | A Nixon | 5 | 0 | 0 | N/A | N/A |

== 1st XV Playing Record ==
=== Daily Mail Cup ===
2007/2008

1st Round: Bye

2nd Round

| Queen Mary's Grammar, Walsall | 5–55 | Old Swinford Hospital |

3rd Round

| Old Swinford Hospital | 32–5 | Newcastle-Under-Lyme School |

4th Round

| Old Swinford Hospital | 32–3 | Wellingborough School |

5th Round

| Old Swinford Hospital | 50–0 | Haileybury School |

6th Round

| Worcester 6th Form College | 7–14 | Old Swinford Hospital |

Quarter Final

| Barnard Castle School | 39–10 | Old Swinford Hospital |

2006/2007

1st Round: Bye

2nd Round

| Prince Henry's High School, Evesham | 0–50 | Old Swinford Hospital |

3rd Round

| Old Swinford Hospital | 21–8 | Hereford Cathedral School |

4th Round

| Prince Henry's High School, Evesham | 0–50 | Old Swinford Hospital |

5th Round

| Old Swinford Hospital | 25–32 | Warwick School |

2005/2006

1st Round: Bye

2nd Round: Bye

3rd Round

| Old Swinford Hospital | 39–0 | Solihull VI Form College |

4th Round

| Old Swinford Hospital | 15–5 | King Edward's Birmingham |

5th Round

| Old Swinford Hospital | 24–15 | Solihull School |

6th Round

| Hereford Cathedral School | 7–26 | Old Swinford Hospital |

Quarter Final

| Durham School | 10–5 | Old Swinford Hospital |

2004/2005

1st Round: Bye

2nd Round

| Sutton Coldfield College | 0–52 | Old Swinford Hospital |

3rd Round

| Old Swinford Hospital | 22–14 | Hereford Cathedral School |

4th Round

| Old Swinford Hospital | 22–9 | Lady Manners School |

5th Round

| Northampton School for Boys | 8–17 | Old Swinford Hospital |

6th Round

| Old Swinford Hospital | 27–23 | Oakham School |

Quarter Final

| Old Swinford Hospital | 47–23 | Durham |
| | (Report) |

Semi-Final

| Exeter College | 19–18 | Old Swinford Hospital |
| | (Report) |

Castlecroft

2003/2004

1st Round: Bye

2nd Round

| KES Five Ways | 0–42 | Old Swinford Hospital |

3rd Round

| Old Swinford Hospital | 45–0 | KES Stratford |

4th Round

| Old Swinford Hospital | 12–19 | Hartpury College |

2002/2003

1st Round: Bye

2nd Round

| Old Swinford Hospital | 26–3 | Worcester 6th Form College |

3rd Round

| KES Lichfield | 0–WO | Old Swinford Hospital |

4th Round

| Old Swinford Hospital | 13–5 | Leicester Grammar School |

5th Round

| Old Swinford Hospital | 14–10 | Northampton School for Boys |

6th Round

| Solihull School | 10–35 | Old Swinford Hospital |

Quarter Final

| Old Swinford Hospital | 10–44 | Barnard Castle School |

2001/2002

1st Round: Bye

2nd Round

| Fairfax School | 3–58 | Old Swinford Hospital |

3rd Round

| Hereford Cathedral School | 10–49 | Old Swinford Hospital |

4th Round

| The King's School, Worcester | 25–23 | Old Swinford Hospital |

2000/2001

1st Round

| Kenilworth School | 13–60 | Old Swinford Hospital |

2nd Round

| Old Swinford Hospital | 42–25 | King Henry VIII School |

3rd Round

| Old Swinford Hospital | WO–0 | Bromsgrove School |

4th Round

| Old Swinford Hospital | 10–11 | Oakham School |

=== The National Schools 7's ===
2009/2010

| Team | Pld | W | D | L | PF | PA |
|---|---|---|---|---|---|---|
| (England) Old Swinford Hospital | 4 | 4 | 0 | 0 | 116 | 51 |
| (Wales) Ysgol Gyfun Morgannwg | 4 | 2 | 0 | 2 | 109 | 67 |
| (England) John Fisher School | 4 | 2 | 0 | 2 | 92 | 79 |
| (England) Wisbech Grammar School | 4 | 2 | 0 | 2 | 77 | 83 |
| (England) Worthing College | 4 | 0 | 0 | 4 | 28 | 142 |

Final 16

| (England) Old Swinford Hospital | 36–21 | (England) Cowbridge Comprehensive School |

Quarter Final

| (England) Old Swinford Hospital | 5–31 | (England) Millfield School |

2007/2008

| Team | Pld | W | D | L | PF | PA |
|---|---|---|---|---|---|---|
| (England) Kirkham Grammar School | 4 | 4 | 0 | 0 | 126 | 24 |
| (England) Old Swinford Hospital | 4 | 3 | 0 | 1 | 155 | 19 |
| (Wales) Ysgol Gyfun Plasmawr | 4 | 2 | 0 | 2 | 79 | 60 |
| (England) Bury Grammar School | 4 | 1 | 0 | 3 | 36 | 139 |
| (England) Medina High School | 4 | 0 | 0 | 4 | 21 | 175 |

2006/2007

| Team | Pld | W | D | L | PF | PA |
|---|---|---|---|---|---|---|
| (England) Old Swinford Hospital | 4 | 4 | 0 | 0 | 179 | 33 |
| (Wales) Llandovery College | 4 | 3 | 0 | 1 | 126 | 26 |
| (Wales) Ysgol Gyfun Llanari | 4 | 2 | 0 | 2 | 102 | 116 |
| (England) Isleworth and Syon Boys' School | 4 | 1 | 0 | 3 | 73 | 101 |
| (Canada) Uxbridge School | 4 | 0 | 0 | 4 | 0 | 204 |

Final 16

| (England) Old Swinford Hospital | 24–19 | (England) Skinners' School |

Quarter Final

| (England) Old Swinford Hospital | 19–12 | (England) Campion School |

Semi-Final

| (England) Old Swinford Hospital | 10–27 | (England) Hartpury College |

2005/2006

| Team | Pld | W | D | L | PF | PA |
|---|---|---|---|---|---|---|
| (England) The Manchester Grammar School | 3 | 3 | 0 | 0 | 99 | 34 |
| (England) Old Swinford Hospital | 3 | 2 | 0 | 1 | 90 | 32 |
| (Wales) Greenhill School | 3 | 1 | 0 | 2 | 64 | 72 |
| (England) Emanuel School | 3 | 0 | 0 | 3 | 10 | 125 |

2004/2005

| Team | Pld | W | D | L | PF | PA |
|---|---|---|---|---|---|---|
| (England) Old Swinford Hospital | 3 | 3 | 0 | 0 | 109 | 33 |
| (England) Adams Grammar School | 3 | 2 | 0 | 1 | 94 | 43 |
| (Wales) Coleg Gwent, Crosskeys College | 3 | 1 | 0 | 2 | 47 | 42 |
| (England) Chew Valley School | 3 | 0 | 0 | 3 | 0 | 132 |

Final 32

| (England) Old Swinford Hospital | 19–14 | (Wales) Ysgol Gyfun Glantaf |

Final 16

| (England) Old Swinford Hospital | 17–19 | (England) Lymm High School |

2003/2004

| Team | Pld | W | D | L | PF | PA |
|---|---|---|---|---|---|---|
| (England) Old Swinford Hospital | 3 | 3 | 0 | 0 | 58 | 20 |
| (England) Colston's School | 3 | 2 | 0 | 1 | 69 | 36 |
| (England) Latymer Upper School | 3 | 1 | 0 | 2 | 46 | 57 |
| (England) St Benedicts School, Ealing | 3 | 0 | 0 | 3 | 0 | 132 |

Final 32

| (England) Old Swinford Hospital | 22–29 | (England) Ivybridge Community College |

== See also ==
- Old Swinford Hospital
- Daily Mail Cup
- The National Schools 7's
