= Barnard Castle School =

Public school in County Durham, England

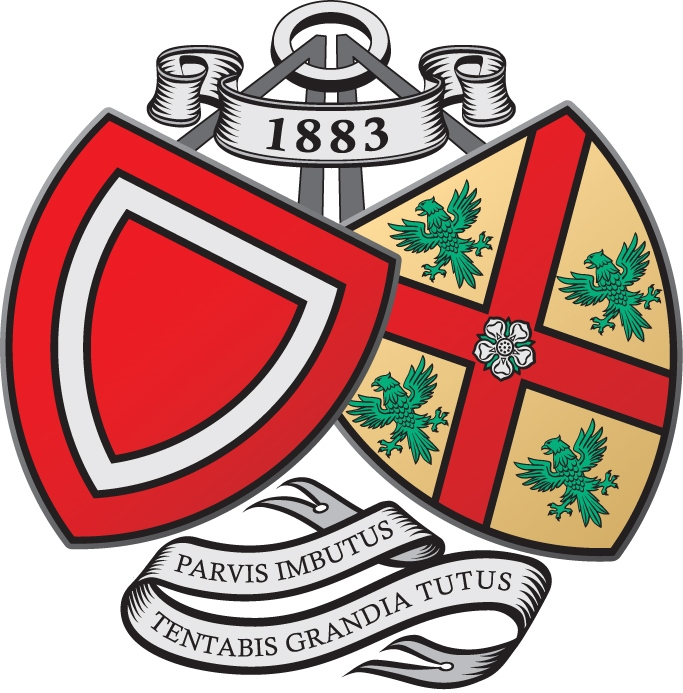

Location
- Newgate; Barnard Castle, County Durham, DL12 8UN; England; 54.5416°N 1.9114°W

Information
- Type: Public school Private day and boarding school
- Motto: Latin: Parvis imbutus tentabis grandia tutus When you are steeped in little things, you shall safely attempt great things.
- Religious affiliation: Inter-denominational with a non-conformist Christian foundation
- Established: 1883
- Founders: John I de Balliol; Benjamin Flounders
- Chairman of the Governors: Peter Mothersill
- Head Master: David Cresswell
- Staff: 120 teaching, 80 non-teaching
- Gender: Co-educational
- Age: 4 to 18
- Enrolment: 660 in 2018 (469 senior 191 prep)
- Houses: Bowes (girls); Dale (boys); Durham (boys); Longfield (girls); Marwood (girls); Northumberland (boys); Tees (boys); York (boys); Junior Boarding House
- Colours: Blue & brown
- Publication: The Barnardian and Barnardians Reconnected
- Former pupils: Old Barnardians
- Website: http://www.barnardcastleschool.org.uk/

Barnard Castle School (colloquially Barney School or locally the County School) is a co-educational private day and boarding school in the market town of Barnard Castle, County Durham, in the North East of England. It is a member of The Headmasters' and Headmistresses' Conference (HMC). It was founded in 1883 with funding from a 13th-century endowment of John I de Balliol and the bequest of the local industrialist Benjamin Flounders. The ambition was to create a school of the quality of the ancient public schools at a more reasonable cost, whilst accepting pupils regardless of their faith.

Originally the North Eastern County School, the name was changed in 1924, but is still generally known locally as the "County School". The school is set in its own 50-acre (20 ha) grounds next to the Bowes Museum, on the outskirts of Barnard Castle. An on-site prep school caters for pupils aged 4 to 11, while the senior school caters for pupils aged 11 to 18. The school was previously funded by direct grant. Founded as an all-boys school, it has been fully co-educational since 1993. There are around 660 pupils and some 200 members of staff.

Since the 1980s, the school has been one of Britain's most successful at producing top class rugby union players. During this period it schooled England international players Rob Andrew and Tony and Rory Underwood. The school has also produced Mathew Tait, Lee Dickson and Tim Visser, and appeared in three finals of the inter-school Daily Mail Cup. Former pupils in other fields include Edward Mellanby (the discoverer of Vitamin D); industrialist Percy Mills, The Lord Mills; fashion designers Giles Deacon and Patrick Grant; poet Craig Raine; and actor Kevin Whately.

== History ==
The school can trace its origins to an endowment made by John I de Balliol, then Lord of Barnard Castle, in 1229. The school itself was established in 1883 when it occupied temporary premises in Middleton One Row, County Durham, whilst construction of the school was undertaken in Barnard Castle. Initially there were 25 boarders and 10-day pupils, but by the end of 1884, there were 76 boarders. Originally known as the North Eastern County School, the main school building was completed on 2 February 1886 and initially housed 116 boarders and 12-day pupils. The Bishop of Durham presided over the foundation ceremony. The building was designed by Clark & Moscrop of Darlington in the Jacobean style, and is a Grade II listed building built with local Yorkstone and Lakeland slate. The school was built for the trustees of Benjamin Flounders and the trustees of St. John's Hospital, Barnard Castle, who managed the Baliol endowment, and was overseen by a University of Durham committee. Flounders was a Quaker industrialist who had helped to fund the Stockton and Darlington Railway. The Flounders trustees financed the entirety of the construction of the school with a donation of £31,000. A further £20,000 was raised by subscription to cover initial running costs, £10,000 of which came from St John's Hospital. The gift from St John's was conditional on the school being situated in Barnard Castle, and this determined its location.

An early photograph of the school

The school's governance was inspired by the county school movement of Joseph Lloyd Brereton, who was largely inspired in turn by the example of Thomas Arnold, the headmaster of Rugby School. The object of the school was to provide a liberal education, with fees set at a fraction of those charged by the leading public schools. Tolerance of non-conformist denominations such as Methodism and Roman Catholicism informed the school's ethos, and the school has always remained independent of the Church of England. Brereton's son became the first headmaster of the school. In contrast to the largely classical education offered by many of the public schools of the time, the school always maintained a focus on scientific and technological education. A strong sporting programme was believed to build character. Extensions over the next few years included a sanatorium in 1890 (now the music school) and a swimming-bath block in 1896. In 1900 a £4,000 (£400,000 in 2010) science block was opened by Lord Barnard with Brooke Foss Westcott, Bishop of Durham in attendance. The building is now inhabited by Tees and Dale houses.

The school name was changed to Barnard Castle School in 1924, and it was by this time one of the largest public schools in the North of England. When Harold Birkbeck was appointed headmaster in 1935 there were 193 pupils. In 1942 the school was elected to the Headmaster's Conference, making it an "official" public school. Following the introduction of the Education Act 1944, from 1945 the school became a direct grant grammar school and the number of pupils enrolled at the school increased substantially. In April 1961 a £65,000 (£1.1 million in 2010) appeal was launched for funding to build new science blocks and a library building. By this time there were 470 boys at the school, more than half of whom progressed to universities or higher education. Birkbeck introduced squash to the school, and made it one of the best-known schools for the sport in the country in the 1960s and 1970s. The novelist Will Cohu described the school in 1974 as "popular with parents who were in the armed forces. It was cheap, did not have any reputation for abuse, and was strong on games". The direct-grant revenue stream was abolished in 1975, making the school reliant upon independent funding. An appeal was launched that year to ensure the school's survival, with £109,000 (£750,000 in 2011) raised within nine months. The school's first computer was installed in January 1978.

Frank Macnamara became headmaster in 1980, described as "an affable enthusiast" in The Guardian. Under his tenure the school would develop its reputation for fostering world-class rugby talent. For the duration of its existence (1980–1997) the school took part in the Assisted Places Scheme. Girls were first admitted to the Sixth Form in 1981, and the school has been fully co-educational since 1993. By 1992 there were around 610 pupils with an approximately 50:50 split between boarding and day pupils. From 1993, as the result of a HMC initiative, Eastern European children were awarded scholarships to study at the school; by 1995, 8 per cent of the school's intake came from overseas. Michael Featherstone, a former England hockey international, was appointed headmaster in 1997, and the school enjoyed considerable academic success during his tenure.

== School site ==
The Pepperpot

One of the North East's most famous schools, Barnard Castle is set in 50-acre grounds on the outskirts of town. It is located in Teesdale, and is within the North Pennines Area of Outstanding Natural Beauty. Giles Deacon has said of the location that "you could just walk out and you were in the middle of the Pennines". The Bowes Museum is situated next to the school. The school caters for pupils aged 4 to 18, with pupils younger than 11 being taught in a separate on-site preparatory school (Prep School). The original building is now used mainly for accommodation and administration and is described as "stately" by The Independent. The school spire is known colloquially as "The Pepperpot". It also contains the dining hall and "Main School", public school slang for the school hall. All teaching is undertaken in purpose-built classrooms. The school site contains tennis/netball courts, squash courts, a large sports hall and an AstroTurf pitch. A total of £3 million has been invested in the school's infrastructure since 2008, including a £1.5 million Physics and ICT block, a new hall for the Prep School and a new sports pavilion containing a gym and a dance studio. The school has been used as a filming location for the television sketch show The Fast Show.

=== Chapel ===
The school's chapel was completed in 1911. It was designed by W. D. Caroe, and Nikolaus Pevsner described it as "impressive" both internally and externally. Somewhat unusually, it is oriented in a north–south direction. A large proportion of the funding to build the chapel was provided by Lord Barnard, the local nobleman and a leading freemason (with the remainder made up from public subscription), and accordingly the foundation ceremony was performed in full masonic regalia. The Grade II* listed building contains a painting by Ary Scheffer and a Father Willis organ. It has stained glass windows commemorating John Balliol and Benjamin Flounders, the two founders of the school. A roll of honour in the chapel commemorates the 141 former pupils and 4 Masters who died in the First World War, the 55 former pupils who died in the Second World War and one who died in the Falklands War. There is a roll of honour in the main school building for the former pupils who died in the Second Boer War.

=== Barnard Castle Preparatory School ===
The Prep School has access to all of the facilities of the senior school. It is situated in a separate area of the school grounds with its own organisation, staff and buildings. The school is sited around a main building called Westwick Lodge, "a sprawling Victorian villa with the modern dormitories and classroom block hidden at the rear. It [has] a long, sloping front lawn, thickly planted with shrubberies ... Round the back [is] a playground and a muddy hill with a few trees". Members of the Prep School are referred to throughout the school as "Preppies".

The school was founded in 1914 and was originally a girls' school, and independent from the County School. In 1989 there were just 65 pupils, all of them boys. By 2009 there were over 200 pupils, equally split between girls and boys. School on Saturdays was abolished at the Prep School in 1999.

== School life ==
=== Intake ===
40 per cent of senior school intake comes from the state sector, and over 50 per cent come from the on-site Prep School. 25 per cent of Sixth Form pupil intake is from state schools. Day pupils commute from a wide catchment area that is predominantly rural in nature. These settlements are as far afield as Hurworth and Stanhope as well as larger settlements such as Kirkby Stephen, Durham, Bishop Auckland, Richmond and Darlington. Pupils are from a range of professional, managerial and farming backgrounds. There are 200 boarding pupils, significant numbers of whom have parents who are members of HM Forces, and many families are linked to nearby Catterick Garrison, Europe's largest military base. 15 per cent of boarders have parents living overseas, particularly Hong Kong. An Open Day is held several times a year when the school welcomes prospective students and their families to tour the school.

=== Academic and routine ===
Every weekday (except for Wednesday) begins with a chapel service. School is held on Saturday mornings, with many sporting fixtures taking place on Saturday afternoons. There is an exeat weekend every term when pupils get respite from Saturday school. The Sunday chapel service is compulsory for boarding pupils. Homework, which is always referred to as "prep" (short for preparatory work), is set for every day with the exception of Sunday. During weekdays there is a mid-morning coffee break for all pupils when refreshments are provided, a tradition from when many day pupils would arrive at that time from outlying settlements. The school uniform is traditional, including a navy blue blazer and a tie. Merits are given as rewards for outstanding work. Punishments include weekday afternoon detention and Saturday afternoon detention. Corporal punishment had to be phased out by 1987 in line with state schools, as it received public funding. The headmaster is aided in his running of the school by the monitor (prefect) system. As well as the standard subjects, Latin, Classics, Ancient History, Greek, German and Spanish are taught. The school has a strong reputation for sciences. In 2011 the Independent Schools Inspectorate described the school's ethos as "traditionally unpretentious".

=== Pastoral ===
Pastoral care is provided through the house system. Each pupil is assigned to a house. Each house has its own accommodation in the school and its own set of tutors to look after members of the house. There are eight vertically integrated houses in total, each with its own colour and heraldic-like shield: The two boys' boarding houses are York (red) and Northumberland (pale blue). The three day-boys' houses are Tees (dark green) and Dale (burgundy), both formed by splitting Teesdale House, the first day boys' house, and finally Durham (gold), which was converted from boarding to day when the school expanded in the 1990s. The boarding girls belong to the original Sixth Form girls' house, Longfield (dark pink), and the new houses formed for day girls when the school became co-educational are Marwood (purple) and more recently Bowes (pale green). The school considered abolishing its boarding facilities when, like many boarding schools, it suffered a significant drop in numbers during the 1990s. However, numbers unexpectedly improved around the turn of the millennium, and this turnaround has often been attributed to the positive image that boarding received from the Harry Potter series. The school is interdenominational, whilst maintaining its foundation in Christian principles and values.

=== Governance ===
The school is a charitable trust governed by a number of foundation and four nominated governors, the latter with links to Durham and Newcastle Universities, Durham County Council/Barnard Castle Town Council, and the Old Barnardians' Club. The school aims to offer the best independent education to children from the North East of England. According to information provided to the Charities Commission, the income of the school was £8.7 million in the 2017-18-year, with the vast majority of the revenue coming from school fees. It has been a member of The Headmasters' and Headmistresses' Conference since 1944.

== Extracurricular activities ==
The houses form the basis for much competition within the school. The first competition in the school year is the House Singing Competition in which every member of the school takes part. Thereafter, throughout the school year, the houses compete against each other in a variety of academic, artistic, and sporting events. An extensive range of almost 100 after-school activities are offered throughout the year, such as The Duke of Edinburgh's Award scheme up to Gold level.

=== Sport ===
Rugby for boys and hockey for girls are the major sports during the Autumn term. In the Spring Term the boys play football, hockey and squash whilst the girls play netball and lacrosse. Both boys and girls take part in cross country running and swimming. During the Summer term, cricket is the most important sport for boys. Teams have toured Mallorca and the Caribbean in recent years. Members of the 1st XI often gain representative honours for their counties and the North of England. The school was described by The Daily Telegraph as "one of the premier cricketing schools of the north". Girls focus on rounders in the summer whilst both girls and boys partake in tennis and athletics. Sports Day is a major fixture in the school calendar.

=== Barnard Run ===
The Barnard Run is a school competition, consisting of a cross-country trial over a hilly course. It is the most important sporting event in the school year. The course has varied considerably over the years. It dates back to 1892 when Lord Barnard donated and presented the trophy. The race takes place annually at the end of the first half of the Spring Term. The girls' and younger boys' race is 2¾ miles while the senior boys' is 4 miles.

Historically the Barnard Run was a seven-mile course which began at Towler Hill Farm, ran to Cotherstone suspension bridge, with an undetermined route back to the school. In 1898 a 4-mile junior Barnard Run was created for 11- to 14-year-olds. In 1904 it was decided that it would be easier for training purposes if the run began at the school, and a new course was developed.

=== CCF ===
The Junior Officers' Training Corps was established at the school in 1909 following an invitation from Lord Haldane, then Secretary of State for War. By 1911 it had 103 cadets and 3 staff. In 1948 all OTCs were superseded by the Combined Cadet Force (CCF). As of 2012 it had almost 200 cadets and 10 staff, making it one of the largest contingents in the country. Facilities associated with the CCF include an armoury and an indoor shooting range. In 2012 the contingent won the Colts Canter competition, which saw it named the best force in the North of England. The CCF offers a variety of trips ranging from shooting range days to summer camps and even visits to military bases. In 2021 three students were appointed to assist Lord Lieutenant of Durham Susan Snowdon in her duties.

Participation in the CCF is optional.

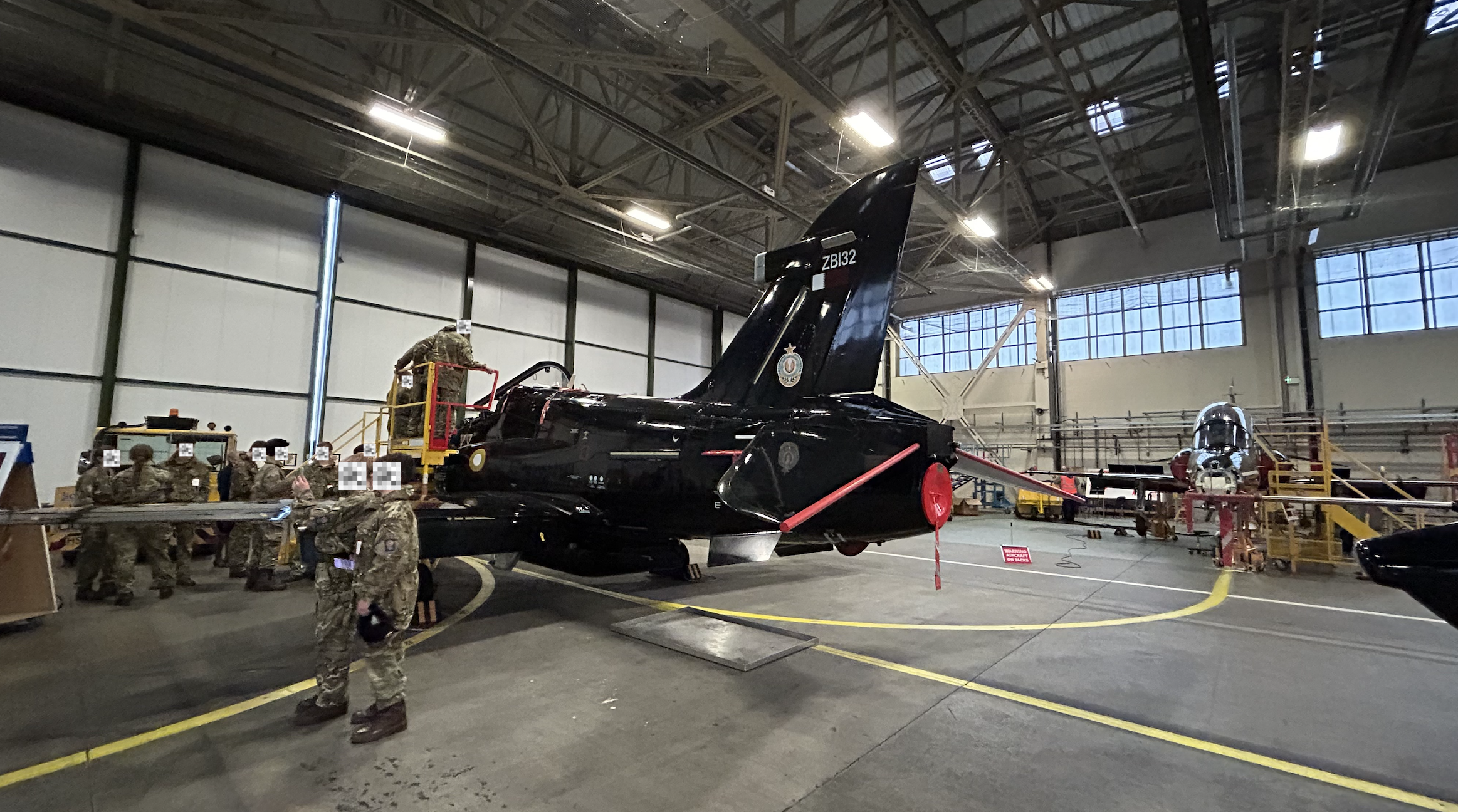
Students from Barnard Castle School's CCF visiting RAF Leeming

==== RAF contingent ====
The CCF has an RAF contingent which has its own uniform and ranks, though parading alongside the army section. The RAF also attend memorial services such as the Teesdale Aviation Day, as well as trips and flying experience opportunities at the nearby RAF Leeming airbase.

== Rugby union ==
The school has produced 38 U19 international rugby players, leading The Times to comment that it has "a happy knack of producing some of England's finest rugby talents." The Observer commented on the rugby success in 2008, "Someone should analyse what they put in the food". The most prominent are Rob Andrew, brothers Rory Underwood and Tony Underwood, and Mathew Tait who have all played for England at international level. Former headmaster David Ewart explained the school's rugby ethos: "We believe the game breeds important life skills in those who play it. It's a civilising game and you need to be a gentlemen on the pitch, as well as off." During the period 1970 to 1995 no other British school produced as many England international players. In 2012 Tim Visser described his former school's rugby programme as "brilliant".

The school is a prominent feeder institution for the Newcastle Falcons, with signings over the last decade including Lee Dickson, Tim Visser, Alex Tait, Ed Williamson and Rory Clegg. Recent signings to other premiership clubs include Calum Clark, Alex Gray and Ross Batty. Many Barnardians represent junior international sides, as well as the North of England, several northern county sides (such as Durham, Cumbria, Yorkshire and Cheshire) and the Independent Schools' Barbarians. The 1st VII have appeared in the final of the North of England Sevens and National Schools Sevens.

The School's 1st XV team reached the final of the national Daily Mail Cup for U18s three times in five seasons between 2002/03 and 2006/07. Nicknamed the Barney Army, the team lost to Oakham School, Colston's School and Warwick School respectively in the 2002, 2003 and 2007 finals. In 2007/2008, the 1st XV were beaten in the semi-finals 19-16 by St Benedict's School. The school reached the finals of the National Schools Sevens in 2002 and 2005.

=== International rugby honours ===
England caps

- Howard Marshall (1891–1893)
- James Hutchinson (1906)
- Tom Danby (1949)
- Rory Underwood (1984–1996)
- Rob Andrew (1985–1997)
- Tony Underwood (1992–1998)
- Mathew Tait (2005–2010)
- Lee Dickson (2012–2014)
- Guy Pepper (2025–Present)

Scotland caps

- Tim Visser (2012–2017)

== Tradition ==
Foundation Day: Celebrated every 6 November. Initially the Barnard Run was held on this day. Before 1892 the tradition was to celebrate the day with a paper chase, but this was replaced after Lord Barnard donated the Barnard Cup.

Speech Day: Occurring on the final day of the Summer Term (usually a Saturday) the entire school community including parents, relatives and friends of the school, meet for Speech Day. The Chairman of the Governors, the Headmaster, an invited Speaker and the Head of School make speeches, and academic prizes are awarded to pupils. Past speakers have included Hensley Henson, Kenneth Calman, Kevin Whately and Angus Thirlwell.

== Alumni ==
- Rob Andrew, former England and British & Irish Lions rugby union player and current Rugby Operations Director at the Rugby Football Union
- Ross Batty, former professional rugby union player with Bath
- Bentley Beetham, ornithologist, photographer and member of the 1924 British Mount Everest expedition
- George Nicholson Bradford, Victoria Cross recipient
- Joshua Harold Burn, pharmacologist
- Andrew Cantrill, organist
- Sam Carling, Labour MP
- Scott Carpenter, international water polo player
- Ian Carr, musician and broadcaster
- Mike Carr, jazz musician
- Calum Clark, rugby union player with Northampton Saints
- Rory Clegg, rugby union player with Newcastle Falcons
- Tom Danby, international rugby union and rugby league player
- Giles Deacon, fashion designer
- Karl Dickson, rugby union player with Harlequins
- Lee Dickson, international rugby union player for England
- Robert Dinwiddie, professional golfer
- Barrie Dobson, historian
- Lionel Fanthorpe, priest, entertainer, television presenter, author and lecturer
- Nigel Farndale, journalist and novelist
- Patrick Grant, fashion designer
- Alex Gray, rugby union player with England Sevens, and former England U20s captain
- Nicholas Hatch, former first class cricketer with Durham
- Glenn Hugill, television producer and presenter
- Ben Jones, former rugby union player with Worcester Warriors
- George Macaulay, test match cricketer
- Howard Marshall, international rugby union player
- Edward Mellanby, discoverer of Vitamin D
- Kenneth Mellanby, ecologist
- Percy Mills, 1st Viscount Mills, Cabinet member and industrialist, director of EMI and chairman of its electronics subsidiary
- Jack Ormston, speedway pioneer
- Richard B. Parkinson, professor of Egyptology
- Jon Paul Phillips, actor
- Craig Raine, poet
- Walter Raine, Conservative MP
- Neil Riddell, former captain of Durham County Cricket Club
- Geoffrey Smith, horticulturalist and broadcaster
- Mark Sowerby, Bishop of Horsham
- Alex Tait, rugby union player with Newcastle Falcons
- Mathew Tait, international rugby union player for England
- RJ Thompson, singer-songwriter
- Andrew Thornton, jump jockey
- Richard Tomlinson, former MI6 officer
- Rory Underwood, former rugby union international
- Tony Underwood, former rugby union international
- Tim Visser, international rugby union player for Scotland
- Kevin Whately, actor
- Ed Williamson, former rugby union player with Newcastle Falcons

== Headmasters ==
- The Rev Francis Lloyd Brereton 1883–1887, 1893–1924
- Edward Henry Prest 1887–1893
- Arthur George Coombe 1924–1935
- Harold Edward Birkbeck 1935–1965
- Sidney D Woods 1965–1980
- Frank MacNamara 1980–1997
- Michael David Featherstone 1997–2004
- David Ewart 2004–2010
- Alan Stevens 2010–2017
- Tony Jackson 2018–2024
- David Creswell 2024–Present

Current staff include the former first-class cricketer John Lister and former List A cricketer Benjamin Usher. Notable former staff have included the educationalist George Graham Able, Bentley Beetham and cricketer Martin Speight. Past governors include Joseph Langley Burchnall, who served on the board for twenty years, rising to the level of chairman.

== See also ==
- Benjamin Flounders – founder of the school
- John Balliol – founder of the school
- List of direct grant grammar schools
