= Ronald Tomlinson =

English darts player and entertainer

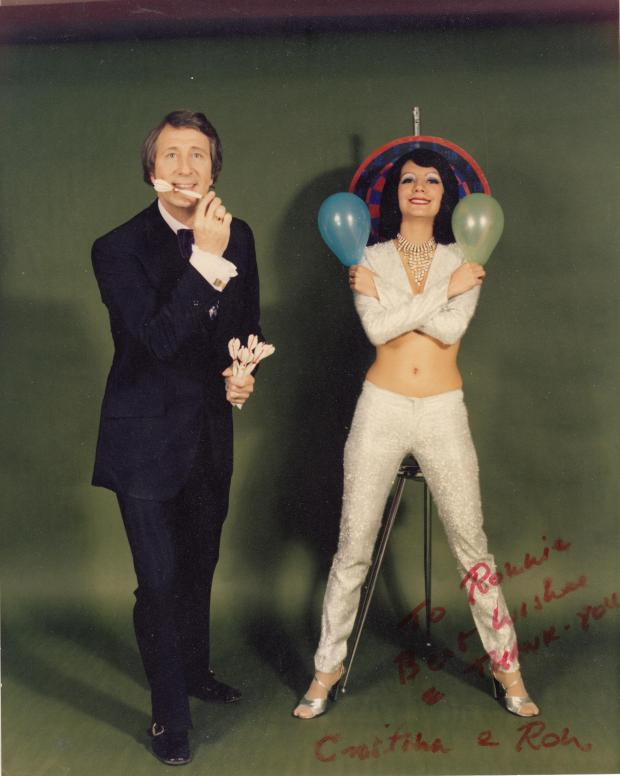
Ronald "Rondart" Tomlinson and his assistant and wife Cristina

Ronald Tomlinson, who performed under the stage name Rondart, (11 September 1929 – 28 January 2005), was a unique professional darts player from West Auckland, County Durham, England, recognised as the world's only professional "darts-blower". His variety act involved blowing darts from his mouth, performing on TV and in cabaret globally—including a 1965 appearance on Billy Smart's Circus and on The Paul Daniels Magic Show.

Rondart could hit targets with incredible accuracy, even splitting a cigarette from 18 ft (5.5 m), often using cork-bodied darts. He toured extensively, performing in Holland, Japan, and Taiwan during the 1960s and 1970s. He also appeared on The Wheeltappers and Shunters Social Club and performed on stage with legendary artists Stan Laurel, Frankie Vaughan and Larry Grayson.

His first stage partner was his wife, Jean. Following their split, he married and performed with Cristina, a former Windmill Girls from Colombia, who toured the world with him for decades.

His act is featured in a British Pathé reel from 1955, filmed on top of the Windmill Theatre in London, where Rondart was a resident for a number of years.

Rondart made his final television appearance in 1995 on a Spanish TV show before retiring in Witton Park. He was known to have worked as a variety act for nearly 50 years before his death in 2005.

== Origins and early career ==
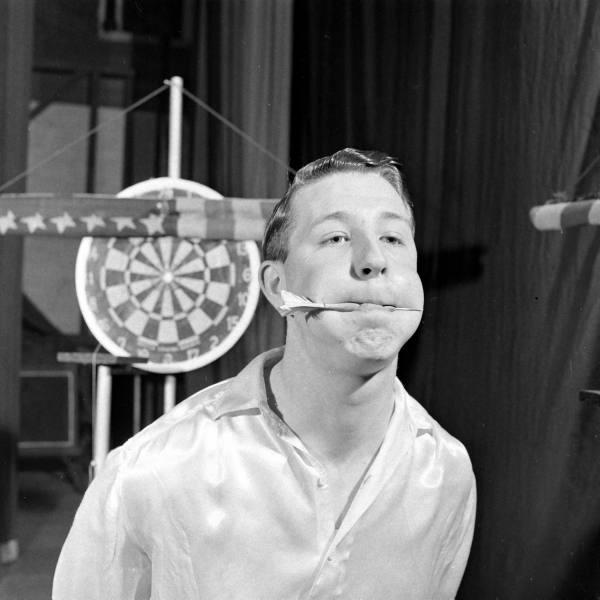
Ronald "Rondart" Tomlinson on stage with a dart in his mouth

The youngest of nine children, Ronald learned his skill from his uncle, Stephen "Syd" Hall, who had himself been taught by Ronald's father, Harry Tomlinson. Harry is said to have developed the technique for "spitting" darts following an injury sustained in World War I which left him without the use of his arms.

Ronald was discovered at age 12 after blowing a lit cigarette off his sister's head with a dart. By the age of 14, he already had business cards advertising his act.

He paused his variety career to serve in the Royal Air Force (RAF) until 1949, after which he returned to the stage and adopted the stage name of "Rondart".

== The performance technique ==
Unlike established techniques of "darts puffing", Rondart's version used no tube. It instead involved placing a dart sideways in the mouth and gripping the wooden barrel with the teeth.

Using "spit force" and tongue propulsion, the dart was expelled at high speed. The dart then turned mid-air to hit the board point-first.

With this technique, Rondart could hit a bullseye from 9 ft (2.7 m) and compete with standard players. His high-stakes tricks included blowing a dart into a bottle neck from 15ft or cutting thin strands of cotton from 18 ft (5.5 m) away to reveal a "That's All Folks" banner at the end of his act.

== A noble act ==
Rondart is credited with saving the life of escapologist James Crossini during a performance gone wrong at the Stockport Royal in May 1956.

Crossini was attempting to escape from a petrol-soaked straitjacket, a feat previously performed by Harry Houdini, when an up draft caused the flames to spread to his hair. Rondart put out the flames by showering the performer in sand and water.

== Preserving the legend ==
A treasure trove of his memorabilia, including posters and darts with his teeth marks, was found in an old Fairy Liquid bottle by Elaine Vizor, the daughter of his childhood friend Ronnie Pounder.

These items formed the basis for a 2022 exhibition at the Bishop Auckland People's Museum which celebrated his life and unique contribution to entertainment.

He was also memorialised by an exhibition at the Darlington Hippodrome in the same year, with the support of his niece, Maureen Wood.
