= 2003–04 Powergen Cup =

Tournament statistics

The 2003–04 Powergen Cup was the 33rd edition of England's rugby union club competition. Newcastle Falcons won the competition defeating Sale Sharks in the final. The event was sponsored by Powergen and the final was held at Twickenham Stadium.

== Draw and results ==
=== First round ===
Team one	Team two	Score
Tynedale	Bedford Athletic	41-31
Blaydon	Darlington	34-18
Market Bosworth	Fylde	24-32
Macclesfield	Aston Old Edwardians	48-11
Preston Grasshoppers	Longton	39-0
Chester	New Brighton	15-12
Halifax	Liverpool St Helens	11-25
Waterloo	Hull	51-10
Darlington Mowden Park	Kendal	70-8
Dudley Kingswinford	Hull Ionians	
Haywards Heath	Basingstoke	23-19
Richmond	Canterbury	12-11
Old Colfeians	Blackheath	13-24
Barking	Old Patesians	42-13
Sutton & Epsom	Tabard	29-25
Westcombe Park	Dings Crusaders	8-21
London Nigerians	Reading	27-14
Launceston	Staines	48-7
Marlow	Southend	10-26
Walsall	Coney Hill	28-8
Redruth	Weston-super-Mare	28-13
North Walsham	Swanage & Wareham	30-20

=== Second round ===
Team one	Team two	Score
Chester	Liverpool St Helens	3-27
Darlington Mowden Park	Wharefdale	20-23
Dudley Kingswinford	Harrogate	21-60
Fylde	Nottingham	22-6
Macclesfield	Preston Grasshoppers	16-17
Nuneaton	Doncaster	19-18
Rugby	Sedgley Park	46-12
Tynedale	Blaydon	11-7
Waterloo	Moseley	41-20
Barking	Stourbridge	30-29
Bracknell	Rosslyn Park	34-20
Esher	Cambridge	85-0
Haywards Heath	Richmond	17-31
Launceston	Southend	32-15
Lydney	Blackheath	30-29
Newbury	North Walsham	32-12
Sutton & Epsom	Dings Crusaders	25-30
Walsall	Redruth	20-32

=== Third round ===
Team one	Team two	Score
Barking	Bedford	14-45
Bracknell	Penzance/Newlyn	15-28
Coventry	Pertemps Bees	21-28
Dings Crusaders	Otley	3-10
Esher	Liverpool St Helens	22-11
Henley Hawks	Newbury	39-17
Launceston	Fylde	59-33
Lydney	Wharfedale	18-20
Nuneaton	Tynedale	23-19
Orrell	London Welsh	21-14
Plymouth Albion	Redruth	64-14
Preston Grasshoppers	Waterloo	10-58
Rugby	Exeter	20-45
Wakefield	Richmond	48-12
Worcester	Harrogate	59-0
Bristol	Manchester	44-22

=== Fourth round ===
Team one	Team two	Score
Bedford	Nuneaton	39-15
Launceston	Waterloo	18-22
Orrell	Henley Hawks	62-10
Otley	Bristol	10-27
Wakefield	Esher	22-16
Wharfedale	Pertemps Bees	14-24
Worcester	Exeter	33-27
Penzance/Newlyn	Plymouth Albion	26-10

=== Fifth round ===
Team one	Team two	Score
Penzance/Newlyn	Bedford	21-19
Wakefield	Worcester	18-17
Waterloo	Pertemps Bees	27-40
Bristol	Orrell	22-20

=== Sixth round ===
Team one	Team two	Score
Leeds Tykes	Harlequins	13-6
Bath	Northampton Saints	42-13
Gloucester	London Irish	29-35
Leicester Tigers	Sale Sharks	28-43
Pertemps Bees	Wakefield	17-10
Bristol	London Wasps	8-46
Penzance/Newlyn	Saracens	20-30
Rotherham Titans	Newcastle Falcons	10-38

=== Quarter-finals ===
Team one	Team two	Score
Sale Sharks	Saracens	26-3
Newcastle Falcons	London Irish	24-12
Leeds Tykes	Bath	21-10
London Wasps	Pertemps Bees	24-28

=== Semi-finals ===
Team one	Team two	Score
Sale Sharks	Leeds Tykes	33-20
Newcastle Falcons	Pertemps Bees	53-3

=== Final ===
17 April 2004

Newcastle Falcons	37–33	Sale Sharks
Try: Britz; Vyvyan; Shaw; Dowson; Con: Walder 4 Pen: Walder 3		Try: Hanley; Cueto; Mayor; Con: Hodgson 3 Pen: Hodgson 4

Twickenham Stadium, London
Attendance: 48,519
Referee: Tony Spreadbury (Somerset)

Newcastle
Sale

15	(England) Joe Shaw
14	(England) Tom May
13	(New Zealand) Mark Mayerhofler
12	(England) Jamie Noon
11	(England) Michael Stephenson
10	(England) Dave Walder
9	(England) James Grindal
8	(England) Hugh Vyvyan (c)
7	(South Africa) Warren Britz
6	(Scotland) Jon Dunbar
5	(Scotland) Stuart Grimes
4	(England) Garath Archer
3	(England) Micky Ward
2	(England) Nick Makin
1	(England) Ian Peel
Replacements:
16	(South Africa) Marius Hurter
17	(England) Hall Charlton
18	(Scotland) Craig Hamilton
19	(England) Matt Thompson
20	(England) Phil Dowson
21	(New Zealand) Daryl Lilley
22	(England) Ben Gollings
Coach:
(England) Rob Andrew

15	(England) Jason Robinson
14	(England) Mark Cueto
13	(England) Chris Mayor
12	(England) Jos Baxendell
11	(England) Steve Hanley
10	(England) Charlie Hodgson
9	(England) Nick Walshe
8	(England) Chris Jones
7	(England) Alex Sanderson
6	(England) Pete Anglesea
5	(Scotland) Jason White
4	(Scotland) Iain Fullarton
3	(Scotland) Barry Stewart
2	(England) Andy Titterrell
1	(England) Andrew Sheridan
Replacements:
16	(England) Matt Cairns
17	(England) Stuart Turner
18	(England) Dean Schofield
19	(Australia) Hugh Perrett
20	(England) Richard Wigglesworth
21	(United States) Mike Hercus
22	(Hong Kong) Vaughan Going
Coach:
(England) Jim Mallinder
