= Mathew Tait =

England international rugby union player

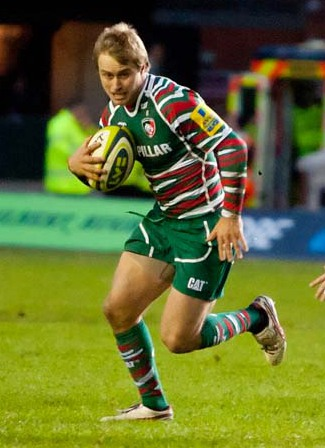
- Born: Mathew James Murray Tait; 6 February 1986 (age 40) Shotley Bridge, Durham, England
- Height: 1.83 m (6 ft 0 in)
- Weight: 90 kg (14 st 2 lb; 198 lb)
- School: Barnard Castle School
- University: Newcastle University
- Notable relative: Alex Tait

Rugby union career
- Position(s): Centre, Fullback, Wing
Senior career
Years	Team	Apps	(Points)
2004–2008	Newcastle Falcons	87	(117)
2008–2011	Sale Sharks	49	(35)
2011–2018	Leicester Tigers	143	(50)
2004–2018	Total	279	(202)
- Correct as of 27 May 2018
International career
Years	Team	Apps	(Points)
2005–10	England	36	(25)
- Correct as of 30 June 2010
National sevens team
Years	Team		Comps
2006	England 7s		
Medal record
Representing England
Men's rugby union
Rugby World Cup
Silver medal – second place	2007 France	Team competition
Men's rugby sevens
Commonwealth Games
Silver medal – second place	2006 Melbourne	Team competition

Mathew James Murray Tait (born 6 February 1986) is a retired English rugby union player who gained 38 caps for England between 2005–2010, including starting in the 2007 Rugby World Cup Final; and played 279 club games for Newcastle Falcons, Sale Sharks and Leicester Tigers between 2004 and 2018. He was considered a utility back regularly playing at centre, fullback or wing. Tait made his Newcastle debut in 2004 and made his England debut at 18 years old in 2005, at the time the second youngest England player selected since the Second World War. He played 87 times for Newcastle before joining Sale in 2008 where he played 49 times. Tait joined Leicester in 2011 and made 143 appearances between his 2011 debut and retirement. While at Leicester Tait started the 2013 Premiership Rugby Final which Leicester won as well as the 2017 Anglo-Welsh Cup Final, which Leicester also won. His final game was on 5 May 2018 against former club Sale.

== Club career ==
Born 6 February 1986, in Shotley Bridge, County Durham, Tait attended Barnard Castle School, where he was a member of the school 1st XV which appeared in the Daily Mail Cup Final for two successive seasons. The school has also produced England internationals Rob Andrew, Rory Underwood, and Tony Underwood.

Newcastle Falcons signed the centre on contract in April 2004 while he was still finishing his A levels, in which he achieved 3 A's. In May 2004 he made his debut in an English Premiership game against London Irish and scored a try with his first touch of the ball.

On 3 May 2008 Tait agreed to a deal to leave the Falcons to sign for Sale Sharks. Tait was linked up with All-Black centre Luke McAlister. During the 2008–09 Guinness Premiership season Tait suffered several injuries and was experimented at full-back. However, as the season continued and entered its latter stages, Tait began to play at his preferred position of outside centre and put in performances that ensured he was selected for England again.

Tait's 2010–11 season was hampered by injury. Complications during knee surgery meant he was unable to play for Sale until late October, and he missed much of November when the problem flared up again. In January Tait suffered a dislocated shoulder during an Amlin Cup match against Cetransa El Salvador; the injury threatened to rule him out of the rest of the season and forced him out of the England Saxons squad.

Tait ended his career at Leicester Tigers, for whom he signed ahead of the 2011–12 season. Tait started the final as Leicester won the 2013 Premiership title. He retired in 2018.

== International career ==
In 2002, he was capped as outside centre by England U16 then U18 and by England under 19 when he was still at school. This was where he was spotted by the National Academy manager, Brian Ashton, who selected him for the Junior National Academy in 2003–04. The then-17-year-old was fast-tracked into the Senior National Academy.

Tait has also played for England's rugby sevens team, he was a member of the side that won the Dubai Sevens in December 2004.

Tait gained media attention when Andy Robinson named him in the England starting XV for their opening 2005 Six Nations Championship game, against Wales on 5 February, which England lost 11–9. Tait failed to make an impact either in attack or defence and was the victim of two tackles from Gavin Henson before eventually being replaced. At just under 19 years of age, he was the second-youngest player to have played for England since World War II, with only his Newcastle teammate Jonny Wilkinson having played at a younger age. He was dropped after the game but later regained his place in the England squad, missing out on the first game of England's 2006 autumn campaign against New Zealand only through injury. He last played a full international for England in 2010.

During his absence from the test squad, Tait was a regular member of England's rugby sevens team. He starred at the sevens tournament in the 2006 Commonwealth Games in Melbourne, finishing as the tournament's top try-scorer, with nine tries, as he helped England to the silver medal.

At the 2007 Rugby World Cup, he made a return to the England squad and was the youngest player in the squad.

Comments made about his performance and ability during and after the 2007 World Cup include Mike Catt hailing him as "the future of English rugby", particularly praising his performance against Tonga. Others have said he is "the exemplar of the coming generation" and that he "came of age in the final"

In the 2008 Six Nations Championship he scored a try in England's 33–10 win over Ireland.

After an injury-ridden start to the 2008–09 Guinness Premiership season, Tait began to play at his preferred position of outside centre and put in performances that ensured he was selected for England for the tests against Argentina and Barbarians.

In July 2009 Tait was selected in Martin Johnson's 32-man elite squad for the second year, and was also selected for England's opening game against Wales in the 2010 Six Nations, again under Johnson's management, starting at outside centre. Another season filled with injuries meant Tait was not selected for the 2011 World Cup squad.

== Personal life ==
In 2006, he started studying toward a Biomedical Science degree at Newcastle University. After moving to Sale, he suspended his studies at the university. In early 2010, he was training to become a pilot, having expressed an interest in becoming a commercial pilot.
