= Ed Williamson =

Ed Williamson may refer to:

- Ed Williamson (American football)
- Ed Williamson (rugby union)

== See also ==
- Edward Williamson, bishop
- Ned Williamson, baseball player
- Eddie Williamson, American football coach
