= Nick Makin =

English rugby union player

- Born: Nicholas James Makin; 21 July 1979 (age 47) Swindon, Wiltshire
- Height: 1.80 m (5 ft 11 in)
- Weight: 103.4 kg (16 st 4 lb)
- School: Canford School
- University: Durham University

Rugby union career
- Position: Hooker
Senior career
| Years | Team | Apps | (Points) |
| 2001–2004 | Newcastle Falcons | 39 | (0) |
| 2004–2007 | Cornish Pirates | 54 | (10) |

Nicholas James Makin (born 21 July 1979) is an English former rugby union player.

Makin, who played as a Hooker, was a member of the winning Newcastle Falcons side in the 2004 Powergen Cup final. He dropped down the rugby pyramid to join Cornish Pirates that summer, retiring from rugby in 2007.

Makin graduated from Durham University in 2001 with a BA degree in Sport. In addition to rugby, he also played cricket for the Hampshire Second XI.
