= George Trimmer =

- Born: 23 October 1996 (age 30) Worcester, England
- Height: 1.91 m (6 ft 3 in)
- Weight: 100 kg (15 st 10 lb)
- School: Old Swinford Hospital
- University: Nottingham Trent University

Rugby union career
- Position(s): Fly-half, Centre
- Current team: Nottingham Rugby
Senior career
| Years | Team | Apps | (Points) |
| 2009–2015 | Worcester Warriors | | |
| 2015–2017 | Nottingham Rugby | | |

George Trimmer (born 23 October 1996) is a former English professional rugby union player who played for Nottingham Rugby. Trimmer made his debut for Nottingham against Newcastle Falcons in 2016 before suffering a severe injury which meant that he could no longer run, and instead entered the Team GB Rowing Scheme.

Trimmer was educated at Old Swinford Hospital where he completed his A-levels. Whilst at school, he was a member of the Worcester Warriors Academy where he played from 13 to the age of 18.

Trimmer currently attends Nottingham Trent University where he combines both rowing and his degree in real estate as a scholar.
