= Roland Bradford =

Recipient of the Victoria Cross

Brigadier-General Roland Bradford VC MC
- Born: 23 February 1892; Witton Park, County Durham, England
- Died: 30 November 1917 (aged 25) near Canal du Nord, Cambrai, France
- Burial place: Hermies British Cemetery, France
- Relatives: George Bradford (brother)
- Military career
- Allegiance: United Kingdom
- Branch: British Army
- Service years: 1910–1917
- Rank: Brigadier-General
- Units: Durham Light Infantry
- Commands: 186th (2/2nd West Riding) Brigade; 9th Battalion, Durham Light Infantry
- Conflicts: First World War: Battle of the Somme; Battle of Cambrai
- Awards: Victoria Cross; Military Cross

Brigadier-General Roland Boys Bradford, VC, MC (23 February 1892 – 30 November 1917) was a British Army officer and an English recipient of the Victoria Cross, the highest award for gallantry in the face of the enemy that can be awarded to British and Commonwealth forces. His elder brother, Lieutenant Commander George Bradford, was also awarded the Victoria Cross, making them the only pair of brothers to be awarded the medal during the First World War.

== Early life ==
Bradford was born on 23 February 1892 at Witton Park, County Durham, to George Bradford. and educated at Epsom College in Surrey. He had three brothers, James Barker, Thomas Andrews and George Nicholson, of which he was the youngest "and by far the liveliest, endowed with an excellent mind and an ebullient sense of fun".

== Military service ==
Bradford was commissioned into the 5th Battalion, Durham Light Infantry (a Territorial Force unit) in 1910. He transferred to the Regular Army in 1912, joining his regiment's 2nd Battalion with the rank of second lieutenant. He was a lieutenant by the outbreak of the First World War in 1914. He was awarded the Military Cross in February 1915.

On 1 October 1916, Bradford, now a temporary lieutenant colonel commanding the 9th Battalion, Durham Light Infantry, was awarded the Victoria Cross (VC) for his actions at Eaucourt L'Abbaye, France. His citation for the award was published in the London Gazette on 25 November, reading:

For most conspicuous bravery and good leadership in attack, whereby he saved the situation on the right flank of his Brigade and of the Division. Lieutenant-Colonel Bradford's Battalion was in support. A leading Battalion having suffered very severe casualties, and the Commander wounded, its flank became dangerously exposed at close quarters to the enemy. Raked by machine-gun fire, the situation of the Battalion was critical. At the request of the wounded Commander, Lieutenant-Colonel Bradford asked permission to command the exposed Battalion in addition to his own. Permission granted, he at once proceeded to the foremost lines. By his fearless energy under fire of all description, and his skilful leadership of the two Battalions, regardless of all danger, he succeeded in rallying the attack, captured and defended the objective, and so secured the flank.

=== Promotion and death ===
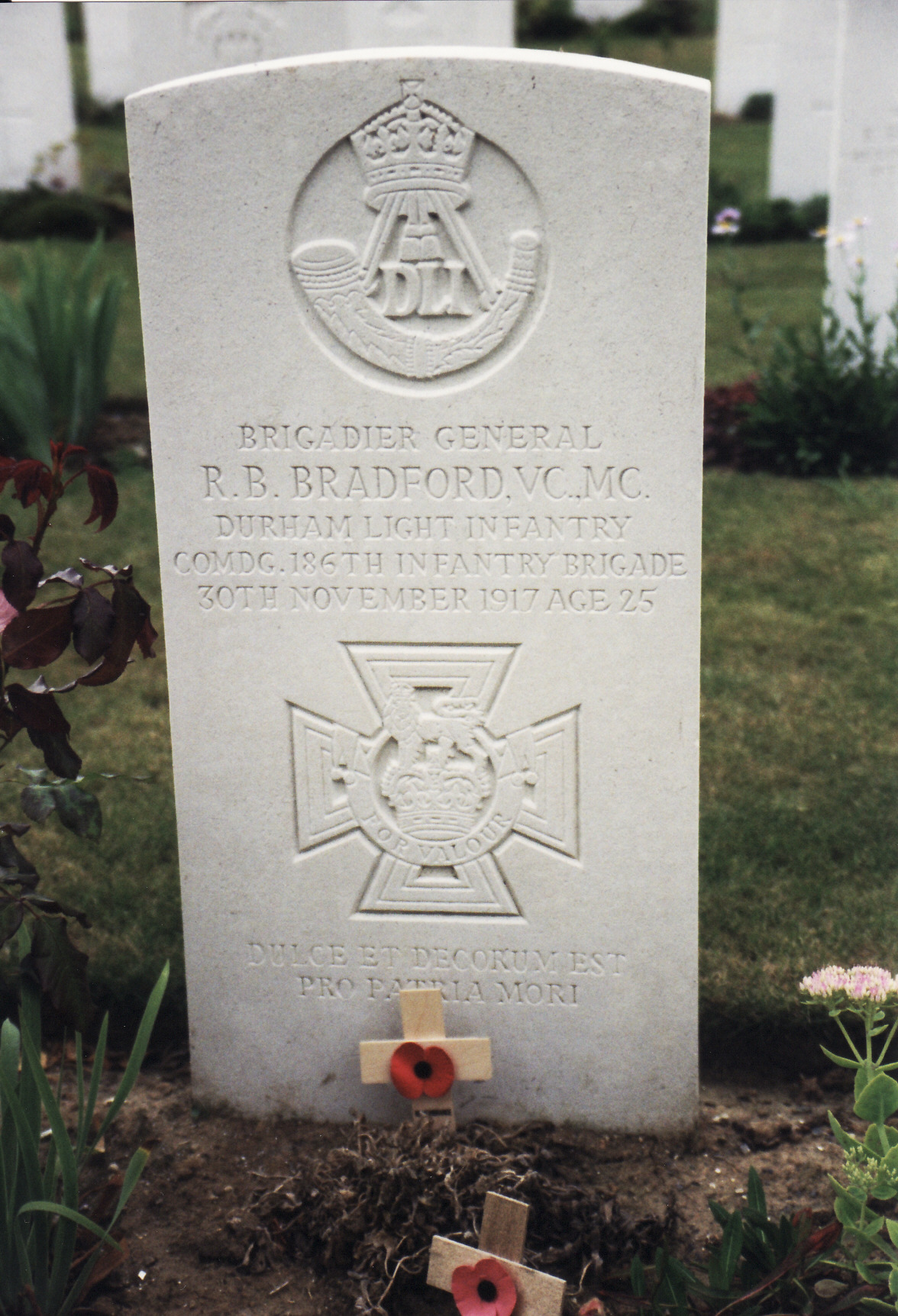
Bradford's grave at Hermies British Cemetery

On 13 November 1917, at the age of 25, he was promoted to the rank of temporary brigadier general; he was the youngest general officer in the British Army of modern times (and the youngest promoted professionally, earlier young generals were simply due to position). He was killed "by a stray German shell" at Cambrai, France, seventeen days later, on 30 November 1917.

All three of Bradford's brothers also served in the First World War. Two, Lieutenant Commander George Bradford of the Royal Navy and Second Lieutenant James Barker Bradford, also of the Durham Light Infantry, died in service. George and Roland were the only pair of brothers to be awarded the VC in the First World War. His third brother, Colonel Sir Thomas Bradford, became honorary treasurer of Durham University and High Sheriff of County Durham in 1941.

== Legacy ==
Bradford's VC and Military Cross are currently on loan to the University of Durham and are held at Palace Green Library adjacent to Durham Cathedral in Durham, England. Medals are not on display, but members of the public are able to consult individual medals or groups of medals from the collection in the Barker Research Library within Palace Green Library.

A memorial garden and statue to Bradford was unveiled in 2017. The British government commemorated the centenary of the First World War by installing an inscribed stone at the recipient's birthplace. Local councillors from Bradford's birthplace at Witton Park decided to use this occasion to create a memorial garden at the site with help from the Heritage Lottery Fund, Groundwork North-East and Durham County Council. A metal statue by Ray Lonsdale called The Ball was installed as part of the memorial garden. This depicts a soldier returning home from the front together with a pitman who is comforting him and passing a football to him representing giving him back his old life before the war.

== Bibliography ==
- Moses, Harry (2003). Fighting Bradfords: Northern Heroes Of World War One. County Durham Books. ISBN 978-1897585757.
- Westlake, Ray (1997) [1900s]. Brigadier-General R.B. Bradford, V.C., M.C. and his brothers. Ray Westlake. ISBN 978-1871167245.
- Gliddon, Gerald (2011) [1991]. Somme 1916. VCs of the First World War. Stroud, Gloucestershire: The History Press. ISBN 978-0-7524-6303-2.
- Buzzell, Nora, ed. (1997). The Register of the Victoria Cross. Cheltenham, Gloucestershire: This England Alma House. ISBN 0-906324-27-0.
- Whitworth, Alan (2015). VCs of the North: Cumbria, Durham & Northumberland. Pen and Sword Books. ISBN 978-1473848221.
- Davies, Frank (1997). Bloody Red Tabs: General Officer Casualties of the Great War 1914–1918. London: Pen & Sword Books. ISBN 978-0-85052-463-5.
