= Alex Gray (sportsman, born 1991) =

English former American football player and rugby union footballer (born 1991)

- Born: Alexander Gray; 1 May 1991 (age 35) Bishop Auckland, County Durham, England
- Height: 6 ft 6 in (1.98 m)
- Weight: 113 kg (17 st 11 lb; 249 lb)
- School: Barnard Castle School

Rugby union career
- Position(s): Number 8, Centre, Wing
Senior career
Years	Team	Apps	(Points)
2010–2011	Newcastle Falcons	9	(5)
2011–2013	London Irish	29	(10)
2016–2017	Yorkshire Carnegie	8	(5)
2020–2021	Bath Rugby	6	(0)
International career
Years	Team	Apps	(Points)
2010–2011	England U20	7	(25)
National sevens team
Years	Team		Comps
2013–2016	England Sevens		
- Football career

Profile
- Position: Tight end

Career information
- High school: Barnard Castle School (Barnard Castle, England)
- NFL draft: 2017: undrafted

Career history
- Atlanta Falcons (2017–2019)*
- * Offseason or practice squad member only
- Stats at Pro Football Reference

Alexander Gray (born 1 May 1991) is an English former rugby union and American football player. He has played for the England Sevens, Newcastle Falcons, London Irish, Yorkshire Carnegie and Bath Rugby, and played tight end for the Atlanta Falcons of the National Football League (NFL). He also appeared as Apollo in the 2024 BBC One reboot of Gladiators.

== Rugby union (2010–2017) ==
=== Club career ===
Gray was a product of Newcastle Falcons Academy and signed a two-year first-team contract at the age of just 17. His primary position is number eight, but he can also play openside flanker. It was announced that the back-rower joined London Irish on 8 August 2011.

After finishing the England Sevens commitment in the summer of 2016, Gray signed for Yorkshire Carnegie for 2016/17 season.

=== International career ===
The former Barnard Castle School Schoolboy has captained England to Grand Slams at Under-16s Under-18s and Under-20s levels, making his Under-18s debut three years young when they toured Australia in 2007. He then skippered the Under-18s through a clean sweep in the 2008 Home Nations tournament, before leading them to six wins from six on their summer tour to Argentina. 2009 saw more success at age group level as he led England 18s again.

Gray made his England Sevens debut in 2013. Subsequently, he was named as 2015 RPA Sevens Player of the Year.

In May 2016, Gray was included in extended Great Britain Sevens squad in preparation for the Rio Olympics.

== NFL career (2017–2019) ==
Gray signed with National Football League club Atlanta Falcons on 25 May 2017, the first British rugby player to pursue a career in American football. He was signed as a practice squad player after attending the NFL Combine and tryouts in Florida through the NFL's International Player Pathway Program. Under the rules governing this scheme, teams in the NFC South division receive one extra practice squad position specifically for an international player, but these players cannot be activated during the season following their signing. He signed a reserve/future contract with the Falcons on 15 January 2018.

On 1 September 2018, Gray was waived by the Falcons and re-signed to the practice squad.

Gray signed a reserve/future contract with the Falcons on 31 December 2018. He was waived/injured during final roster cuts on 31 August 2019, and reverted to the team's injured reserve list the next day. He was waived from injured reserve on 13 January 2020.

== Rugby union (2020–2021) ==
Gray returned to rugby union from the NFL when he signed with Bath Rugby in November 2020. He left the team in the offseason after making only six appearances.

== Gladiators ==
In the beginning of 2024, Gray joined the cast of the British television series Gladiators as Apollo.
