= George Robson (rugby union) =

English rugby union player

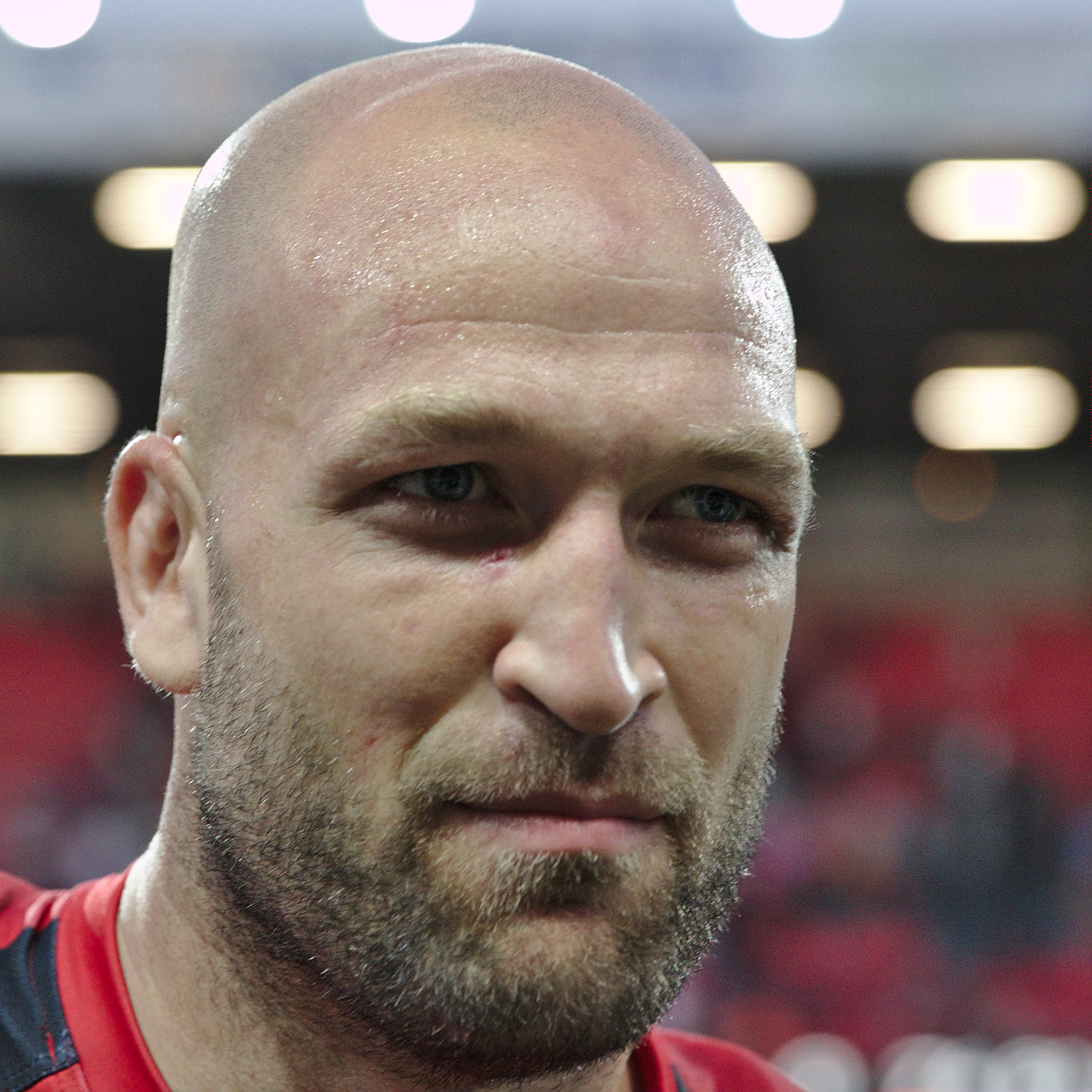
- Born: George Robson; 4 November 1985 (age 41) Stourbridge, West Midlands, England
- Height: 1.96 m (6 ft 5 in)
- Weight: 113 kg (17 st 11 lb)
- School: Old Swinford Hospital; Bromsgrove School
- University: Oxford University
- Occupation: Businessman

Rugby union career
- Position(s): Lock, Flanker
Senior career
Years	Team	Apps	(Points)
2006–2015	Harlequins	203	(55)
2015–2016	Oyonnax		
2016–2017	London Irish		
International career
Years	Team	Apps	(Points)
- England U16
–	England U18		
–	England Saxons		
–	England XV		

George Robson (born 4 November 1985) is a retired English rugby union player. His position was Lock. He holds the record as Harlequins most capped lock in the professional era with 203 appearances for the club.

== Career ==
Robson was a student at Bromsgrove School and Old Swinford Hospital and played for England at both Under 16 and Under 18 level and made his first appearance for Quins in the Zurich A League during 2005. He spent a month at the Sharks Academy at Durban during the summer of 2005 before going on to make his 1XV debut for Harlequins on 18 February 2006, when he came off the bench in the 52–12 win against Coventry at the Stoop.

Robson quickly became a regular starter and was in the Harlequins team for their 2011 European Challenge Cup final victory over Stade Français Paris. A year later he was once more on the winning side as Harlequins secured their 2011–12 Premiership final victory over Leicester Tigers.

During this period he also began to gain coaching experience, first with KCS Old Boys in the 2010–11 season and later in 2014–15 with Farnham RFC.

After spending his entire professional career to date at Harlequins, in February 2015, it was announced that he would join Oyonnax in summer 2015. He spent just one year in France before signing a one-year contract with London Irish in Summer 2016, where he helped the Exiles secured promotion back to the Premiership at the end of the 2016–17 season Robson left London Irish in 2017 retiring from professional rugby to pursue further study and business opportunities.

Robson went on to win a Blue for Oxford University in the 2018 Varsity Match as part of the victorious Blues side, beating Cambridge University 38–16. In doing so he closed the chapter on his rugby playing career.

== International career ==
Robson gained senior international recognition that Summer when touring with England to South Africa in 2012 and captained an England XV to two victories over the a South African Barbarians South team and SA Barbarians North side.
