= George Bradford =

English naval officer

George Nicholson Bradford
- Born: 23 April 1887; Witton Park, County Durham, England
- Died: 23 April 1918 (aged 31); Zeebrugge, Belgium
- Burial place: Blankenberge Town Cemetery, Blankenberge
- Relatives: Brigadier General Roland Bradford (brother)
- Military career
- Allegiance: United Kingdom
- Branch: Royal Navy
- Service years: 1902–1918
- Rank: Lieutenant commander
- Commands: HMS Iris II
- Conflicts: First World War: Zeebrugge Raid †
- Awards: Victoria Cross; Mentioned in dispatches

Lieutenant Commander George Nicholson Bradford VC (23 April 1887 – 23 April 1918) was an officer in the Royal Navy and an English recipient of the Victoria Cross, the highest award for gallantry in the face of the enemy that can be awarded to British and Commonwealth forces. His brother, Roland Bradford, was also awarded the Victoria Cross, making them the only brothers to be awarded the medal during the First World War.

== Early life ==
Bradford was born in Witton Park, County Durham, on 23 April 1887 to George Bradford and Amy Marion Andrews. He had three brothers, Thomas Andrews, James Barker and Roland Boys, all of whom served in the First World War. He attended Barnard Castle School.

== First World War ==
Bradford was 30 years old and a lieutenant commander in the Royal Navy during the First World War when he was awarded the Victoria Cross for his actions on 22/23 April 1918 at Zeebrugge, Belgium, when in command of the naval storming parties embarked in HMS Iris II. He died on 23 April 1918, his 31st birthday, committing the act for which he was awarded the cross. The citation for his Victoria Cross read:

For most conspicuous gallantry at Zeebrugge on the night of the 22nd–23rd April, 1918. This Officer was in command of the Naval Storming Parties embarked in Iris II. When Iris II proceeded alongside the Mole great difficulty was experienced in placing the parapet anchors owing to the motion of the ship. An attempt was made to land by the scaling ladders before the ship was secured. Lieutenant Claude E. K. Hawkings (late Erin) managed to get one ladder in position and actually reached the parapet, the ladder being crushed to pieces just as he stepped off it. This very gallant young officer was last seen defending himself with his revolver. He was killed on the parapet. Though securing the ship was not part of his duties, Lieut.-Commander Bradford climbed up the derrick, which carried a large parapet anchor and was rigged out over the port side; during this climb the ship was surging up and down and the derrick crashing on the Mole. Waiting his opportunity he jumped with the parapet anchor on to the Mole and placed it in position. Immediately after hooking on the parapet anchor Lieut.-Commander Bradford was riddled with bullets from machine guns and fell into the sea between the Mole and the ship. Attempts to recover his body failed. Lieut.-Commander Bradford's action was one of absolute self-sacrifice; without a moment's hesitation he went to certain death, recognising that in such action lay the only possible chance of securing Iris II and enabling her storming parties to land.

— The London Gazette, No. 31236, 14 March 1919

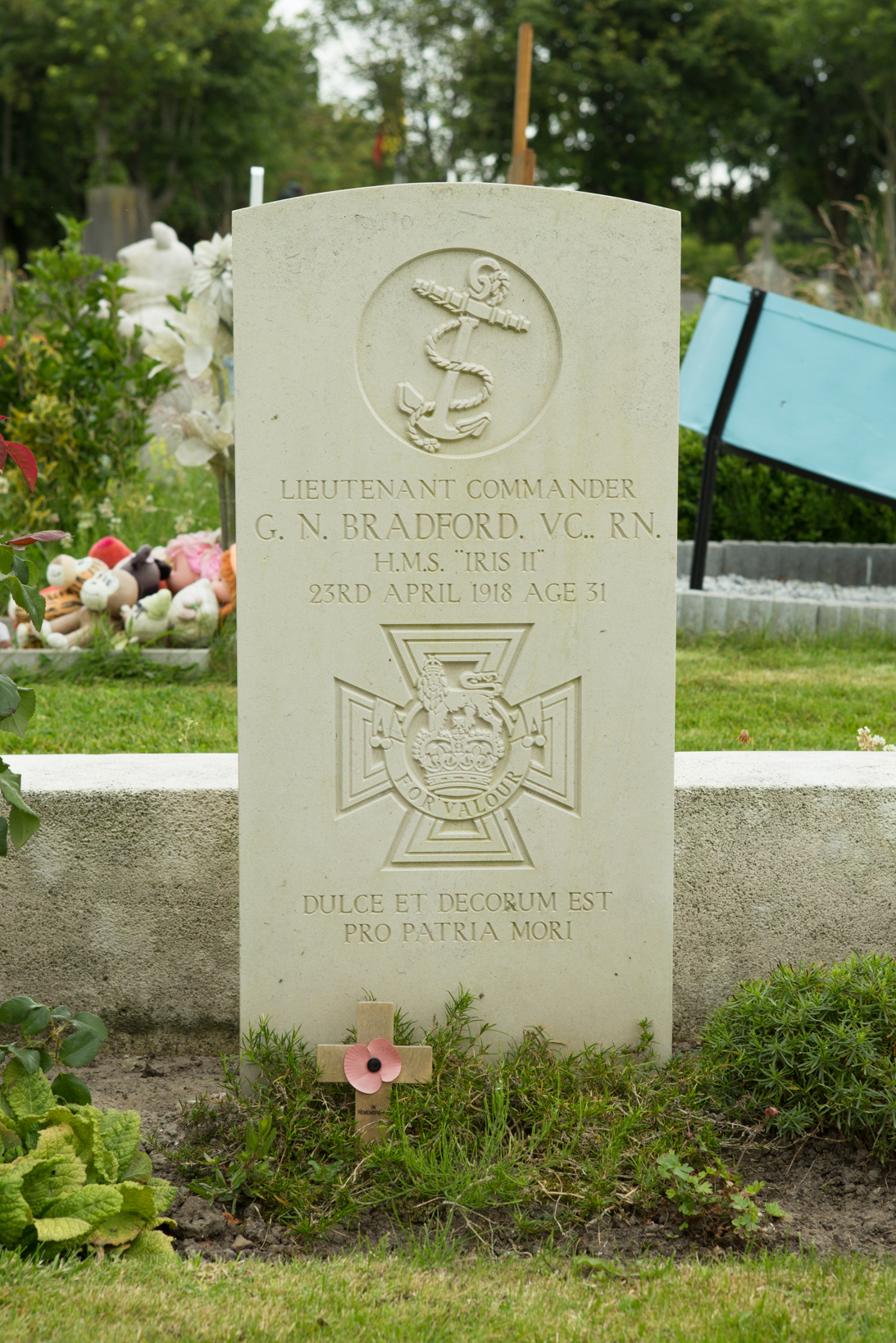
Bradford's grave at Blankenberge Town Cemetery, in Belgium

Two of his brothers, Brigadier General Roland Bradford and Second Lieutenant James Barker Bradford, also died in service. His VC is on display in the Lord Ashcroft Gallery at the Imperial War Museum, London.

In 2018, a commemorative VC Stone memorializing Bradford was unveiled in Darlington Market Place, nearby to the village of Witton Park where he was born.

== Bibliography ==
- Whitworth, Alan (2015). VCs of the North: Cumbria, Durham & Northumberland. Pen and Sword Books. ISBN 978-1473848221.
