= Lee Dickson =

England international rugby union player

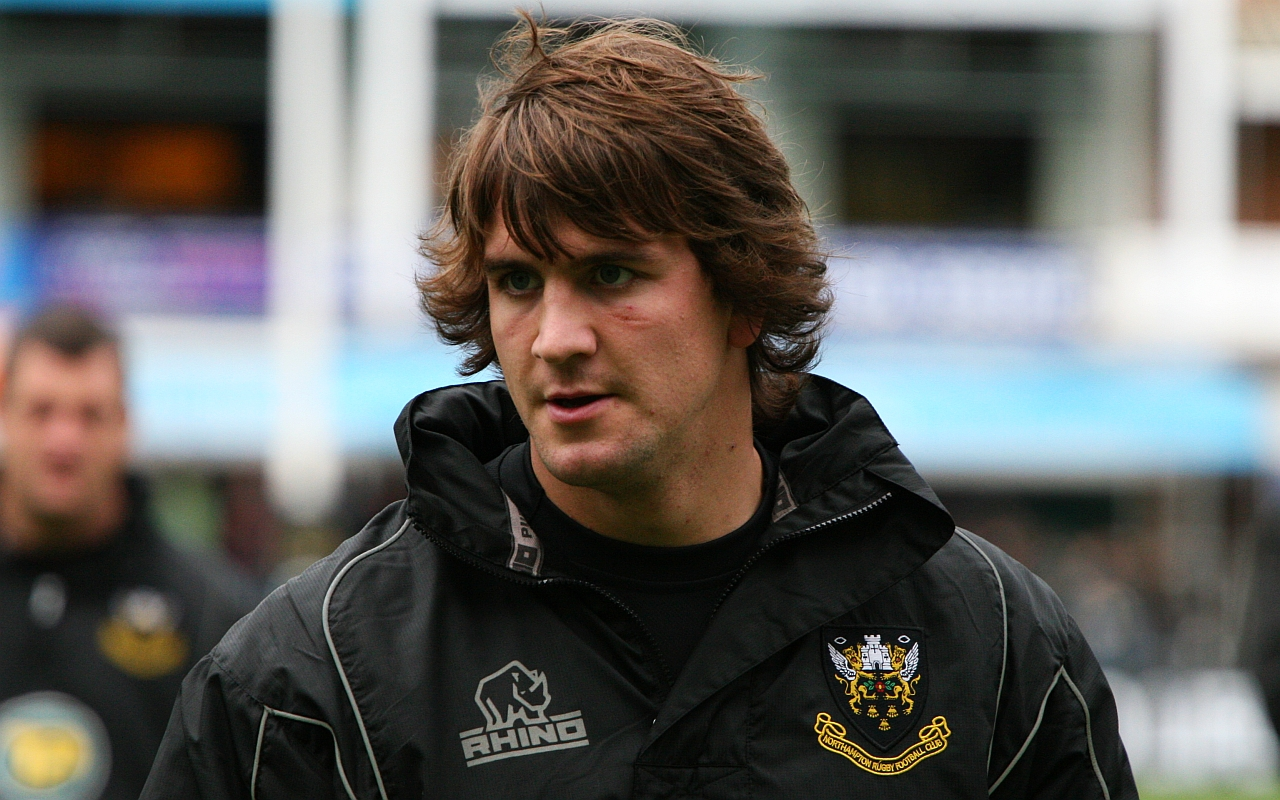
- Dickson at the Northampton Saints vs Sale Sharks match, October 24, 2009
- Born: Lee Alwyne Walter Dickson; 29 March 1985 (age 41) Verden, Lower Saxony, West Germany
- Height: 1.78 m (5 ft 10 in)
- Weight: 85 kg (13 st 5 lb; 187 lb)
- School: Barnard Castle School
- Notable relative: Karl Dickson

Rugby union career
- Position: Scrum-half
Senior career
Years	Team	Apps	(Points)
2004-2008	Newcastle Falcons	79	(10)
2008-2017	Northampton Saints	259	(165)
2017-2019	Bedford Blues	49	(25)
International career
Years	Team	Apps	(Points)
2007	England Saxons	12	
2012-2014	England	18	(0)
National sevens team
Years	Team		Comps
	England		1
Coaching career
- Years: Team
- 2024-: Newcastle (Backs & Attack Coach)

Lee Dickson (born 29 March 1985 in Verden, Germany) is a retired English professional rugby union player who played at scrum-half for Newcastle Falcons, Northampton Saints, and Bedford Blues. He played for the England national side 18 times between 2012 and 2014. He is now the Skills Coach at the Newcastle Red Bulls and Master in Charge of Rugby at Barnard Castle School.

== Business ==
Dickson is 1/4 owners of OUTOFTHESCRUM with brother Karl and Harlequins player Ross Chisholm. OUTOFTHESCRUM was launched on 19 June 2019.

== Background ==
Dickson was educated at Barnard Castle School where he learnt his rugby. His first club was Newcastle Falcons where he made his debut for first team in the 2004-05 Zurich Premiership season.

Born in Germany to an English mother and Scottish father, Dickson represented Scotland at the 2004 Under-19 World Cup before switching his international allegiance to England and being part of their Under-21 World Cup campaign a year later.

Dickon's older brother Karl Dickson is also a former professional rugby union player for Harlequins and England.

Dickson lives in County Durham.and works as the head of rugby at Barnard castle school

== Club career ==
Dickson spent four seasons at Newcastle Falcons and made 41 appearances for the north east club before moving to newly promoted Northampton Saints ahead of the 2008-09 Guinness Premiership season. He was a try scorer as Northampton Saints won the LV= Cup for the first time in 2010, and showed his hunger for the big games by going over the whitewash in the 2013 Aviva Premiership final. In 2014 Dickson played as a replacement as Northampton beat Saracens to win the Premiership. The scrum half was named as the club captain for the 2015-16 season, replacing Dylan Hartley. Tom Wood took over the captaincy for the 2016-17 campaign, however. On 6 April 2017 it was announced that Dickson would join Bedford Blues as player-coach for the 2017-18 Greene King IPA Championship season. Lee retired from professional rugby at the end of the 2018-19 season, following a colourful 15-year career.

== International career ==
In 2008, Dickson played for England Saxons in the side that defeated Ireland A. He was also called up to the England squad for the 2008 Six Nations Championship.

In 2012, Dickson made his debut for the full national team off the bench in England's 6 Nations match with Scotland, in which England won 13-6 and retained the Calcutta Cup. Subsequently, the England scrum half played four of the five games on the South African tour in June 2012. His last appearance in the England jersey is when he played against the All Blacks during the 3-test series in summer 2014. Dickson has since earned 18 caps for England.

== Coaching career ==
Upon retiring from playing, in August 2019 Dickson returned to his former school - Barnard Castle School - as the Master in Charge of Rugby. In September 2024, Dickson returned to his first club, Newcastle Falcons, as Skills Coach, combining this role with his duties at Barnard Castle.
