= Karl Dickson =

English rugby union player (born 1982)

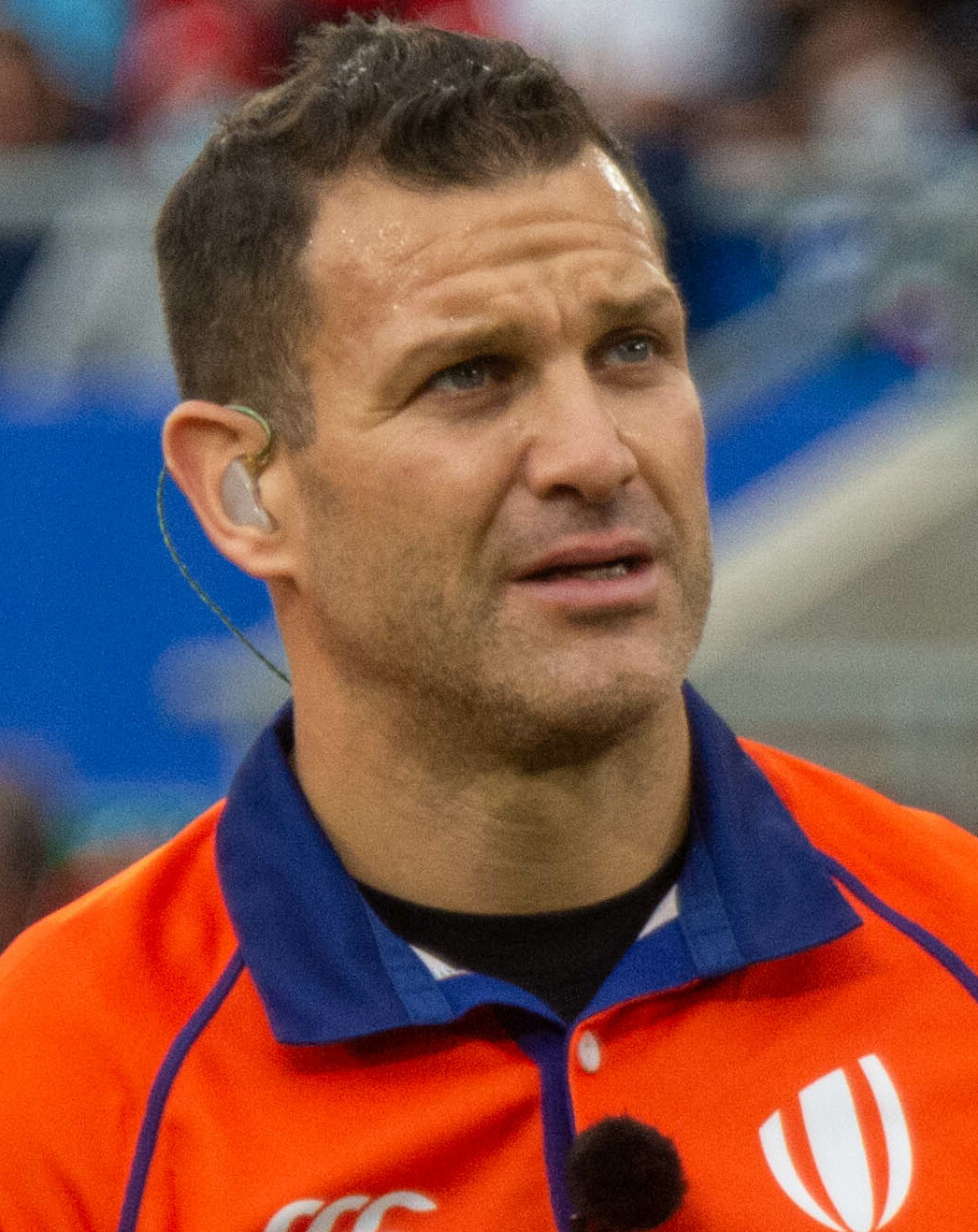
- Dickson in 2021
- Born: Karl Steven Dickson; 2 August 1982 (age 44) Salisbury, England
- Height: 1.75 m (5 ft 9 in)
- Weight: 85 kg (13 st 5 lb)
- School: Barnard Castle School
- Notable relative(s): Lee Dickson Parents = Shirley winter, Stephen Dickson

Rugby union career
- Position: Scrum-half
Youth career
- 2001-2004: Bedford Blues
Senior career
Years	Team	Apps	(Points)
2004-2009	Bedford Blues		
2009-2017	Harlequins	169	(100)

Karl Dickson (born 2 August 1982), is an English professional rugby union referee and former scrum half for Bedford Blues and Harlequins. He has previously coached at St. John's School, Leatherhead.

== Early life ==
Dickson started rugby at Barnard Castle School and is a graduate from Coventry University. The Salisbury born scrum half is a graduate of the Bedford Blues academy system.

== Club career ==
He was promoted to Bedford's senior team in 2004 and made over 100 appearances for the club until 2009 when he joined Harlequins. Although Karl was usually selected behind England scrum half Danny Care at Quins, he remained highly rated within the club with Harlequins Director of Rugby Conor O'Shea stating that he believed Dickson to be "among the best five scrum halves in the country".

He was a replacement for Harlequins in their 2011–12 Premiership final victory over Leicester Tigers.

On 24 April 2017, Dickson announced his retirement from professional rugby playing at the end of 2016–17 Aviva Premiership season. He would continue his rugby career as a professional referee.

== International career ==
Dickson was named in the England Saxons squad on 11 January 2012 but was called up to the England Squad for both the 2012 Six Nations and the South Africa tour due to injuries. Karl came off the bench in the second mid-week fixture against South African Barbarians North, replacing his younger brother Lee, but never received a full international cap.

== Refereeing career ==
On 10 May 2017, it was announced Karl Dickson will join the Rugby Football Union's Professional Game Match Officials Team (PGMOT) next season following his retirement from rugby said a statement on the Harlequins official website.

Dickson began his refereeing qualifications in January 2014 and continued to play for Harlequins while gaining experience officiating.

Through the London Society of Referees he made his refereeing debut at the Reigate School 7s in March 2014 and since then has taken charge of a range of matches including schools, club juniors, sevens as well as local and national league clubs.

Last season he became a member of the National Panel as one of the best 55 referees in the country and was appointed to his first National League 1 fixture in October when Old Albanians played Loughborough Students.

Dickson has refereed two A League semi-finals, Exeter v Newcastle in 2016 and Gloucester v Wasps in 2017 and made his debut in the Greene King IPA Championship in the Christmas Eve match between London Irish and Richmond. Three days later he was involved in Big Game 9 where Harlequins played Gloucester in the Aviva Premiership at Twickenham.

After 169 appearances for Harlequins scrum-half Dickson announced his retirement in April and joins the PGMOT in July.

In an interview to RPA, he said refereeing at international level was his "main goal", a goal reached when in October 2020, Karl was appointed as the main referee in a friendly game between France and Wales, in the Stade de France.

== Personal life ==
Karl grew up travelling the country due to his father being in the military. He then settled at Banard Castle School where his love for rugby began. Karl didn't find his love of Rugby until he was a teenager, from then he succeeded within the sport. Karl went to university in Coventry, studying Sport Science and graduated in 2003. Towards the end of university he played a few fun rugby games, but then transferred to Bedford University to do a PGCE and thought he would give rugby another go. This is where his professional career began. (Sourced from https://thecareerchangers.com/karl-dickson-career-change/ ) Karl divorced his ex-wife in 2017 (2014–2017).Karl has twin daughters and lives in Surrey.

His brother Lee Dickson, who is also a professional rugby player and also attended Barnard Castle School with him.
