= Roi Wilson =

Roi Edgerton Wilson
- Nickname: Tug
- Born: 1 June 1921; Stourbridge, Worcestershire
- Died: 17 March 2009 (aged 87)
- Allegiance: United Kingdom
- Branch: Royal Navy
- Service years: 1941–1973
- Rank: Captain
- Conflicts: Second World War Malayan Emergency
- Awards: Order of the British Empire (CBE) Distinguished Flying Cross(DFC)

Captain Roi Edgerton "Tug" Wilson, CBE, DFC (1 June 1921 – 17 March 2009) was a Royal Navy officer and Master of the Royal Caledonian Schools.

== Early life ==
He was educated at Old Swinford Hospital, Stourbridge then worked in an engineering company before volunteering for the Royal Navy.
