= Scott Carpenter (water polo) =

British Australian water polo player

Personal information
- Born: 26 June 1988 (age 37); Sedgefield, Great Britain

Sport
- Sport: Water polo

Scott Thomas Carpenter (born 26 June 1988) is a British Australian water polo player. He competed in the Spanish Division D'Honor for Club Natacio Terrassa. He also represented the Victorian Tigers and Victorian Seals in Australia, as well as the Australian and Great Britain National Teams on over 200 occasions. He led Melbourne's Victorian Tigers to the Australian National Water Polo League Title in 2010 and 2012 as captain.

He was granted Australian citizenship in order to represent Australia at the Rio 2016 Olympics. He made his debut for the Australian National Water Polo team in November 2015, scoring a goal in a 7 6 win over Italy. He retired shortly afterwards following major shoulder surgery.

A prolific goal scorer, his individual achievements included winning the Top Goal Scorer Award at the 2009 European Water Polo Championship in Lugano, Switzerland, breaking the all-time record for goals in a season (109) in the UK when aged just 18, and taking the Highest Goal Scorer Award in the Australian National Water Polo League.
