= Richard West (rugby union) =

England international rugby union player

- Born: 20 March 1971 (age 55) Hereford
- Height: 6 ft 10 in (2.08 m)
- Weight: 20 st 0 lb (127 kg)
- School: Old Swinford Hospital
- University: UWE

Rugby union career
- Position: Lock
Senior career
Years	Team	Apps	(Points)
- Gloucester
–	Richmond		
International career
Years	Team	Apps	(Points)
1995	England	1	(0)

Richard West (born 20 March 1971, in Hereford) is a former English rugby union footballer. He played as a lock.

He was educated at Old Swinford Hospital and the University of the West of England in Bristol.

West played over 100 times for Gloucester Rugby as well as playing for the Barbarians (8 Appearances), King Country Rugby Football Union (4 Appearances), Midlands and England at U21, Students, Emerging Players and A team level. He was one of the first signings to the professional era with Richmond FC when they announced their professional proposals along with Ben Clarke and Scott Quinnell.

He was selected for England at the 1995 Rugby World Cup finals. He was capped against Manu Samoa in Durban as a starting player and retired in 1998 aged 27 with a serious neck injury. He was alleged to be the heaviest player to be capped for England at 21st 8 lbs.

West now runs his own surveying practice in Ledbury, Herefordshire.
