= James Collins (rugby union) =

England international rugby union player

- Born: James Collins; 8 February 1986 (age 40) Birmingham, West Midlands
- Height: 1.93 m (6 ft 4 in)
- Weight: 103 kg (16 st 3 lb)
- School: Old Swinford Hospital

Rugby union career
- Position: Flanker
- Current team: Worcester Warriors
Senior career
Years	Team	Apps	(Points)
2006 -	Worcester Warriors	9	(0)
International career
Years	Team	Apps	(Points)
2005	England Under 19		
National sevens team
Years	Team		Comps
2008	England		Wellington

James William Collins (born 8 February 1986 in Birmingham) is an English rugby union player. He played as a flanker for Worcester Warriors in the Guinness Premiership.

As a product of the academy system, back row Collins started the EDF Energy Cup victory over Northampton Saints at Franklin's Gardens in September 2006 and European Challenge Cup game with Clermont in October 2006. He has also made a number of Guinness 'A' league appearances.

In January 2008, Collins was selected to play for the England Sevens team for their IRB Sevens World Series games, making his debut at the 2008 Wellington Sevens.

In March 2009, Collins signed a new deal keeping him at Sixways until the end of the 2011 RFU Championship Season, but in March 2011, it was announced that James had been released by the club and that he had signed a new two-year deal with the Sale Sharks Rugby Club.
