= Old Swinford Hospital =

Location
- Heath Lane; Stourbridge, West Midlands, DY8 1QX; England; 52.4507°N 2.1442°W

Information
- Type: Voluntary aided boarding Day and boarding school
- Motto: Ut prosim, vince malum bono
- Religious affiliation: Church of England
- Established: 1667; 359 years ago
- Founder: Thomas Foley
- Local authority: Dudley
- Specialists: Business and Enterprise, Science
- Department for Education URN: 103870 Tables
- Ofsted: Reports
- Chair: Malcolm Wilcox
- Headmaster: Graeme Wright
- Staff: 185
- Gender: Coeducational
- Age: 11 to 18
- Enrolment: 947
- Houses: 6
- Colour
- Publication: The Foleyan
- Former Pupils: Old Foleyans
- Website: http://www.oshsch.com

Old Swinford Hospital is a secondary boarding school in Oldswinford, Stourbridge which has been in continuous operation since the 17th century. It is one of 34 state boarding schools in the UK, 31 of which are secondary schools.

== History ==
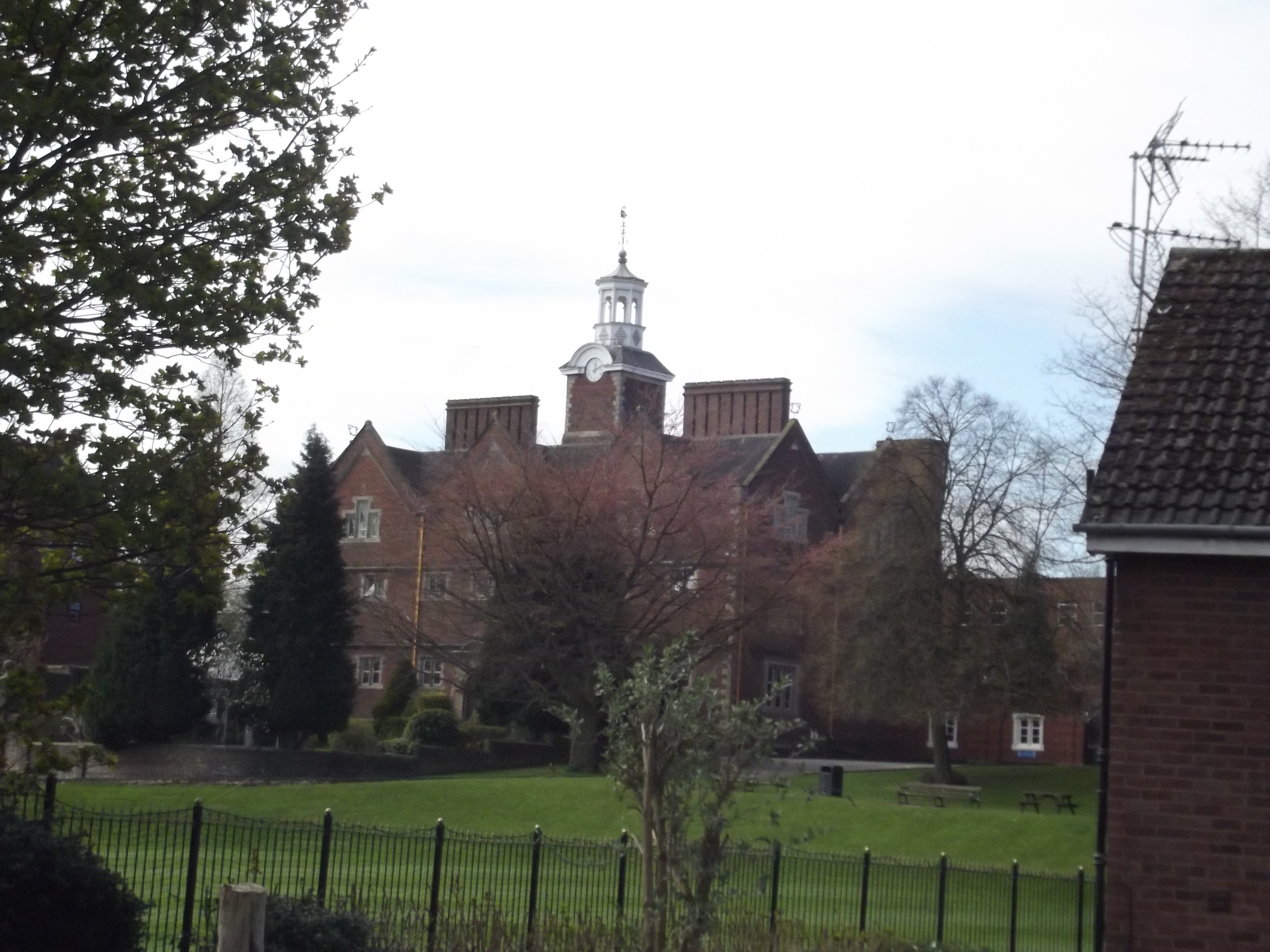
Old Swinford Hospital from Hagley Road, Stourbridge. The building seen is known as Founders. It is the oldest building on the site.

Old Swinford Hospital opened in 1667, under the original name Stourbridge Hospital. It was founded by Thomas Foley, an ironmaster and prominent local landowner, whose main estate was at Great Witley, in Worcestershire. It was to educate 60 boys from "poor but honest" families nominated by specified parishes in Worcestershire, Staffordshire and Warwickshire. The school was sometimes named as Foley's blue coat school or hospital, or Oldswinford Hospital Endowed School. The school had increased to 70 boys by 1868.

The school experienced a period of growth following the appointment of William Maybury as headmaster, with the number of boys reaching 160 by 1883. To accommodate the increased enrollment, a new boarding house, named after Maybury, was constructed during this time. Additionally, a sanatorium (now known as Foster House) had been built by the early 1870s. Despite the construction of the Great Hall in 1905, the school's finances deteriorated by the early 1920s. This led the administration to limit enrollment, allowing the number of pupils to fall to 125. This decline continued dramatically, reaching a low of only 42 boys by 1947. The following year, 1948, marked the first record of parents making direct payments for their children's attendance.

Under the leadership of headmaster LWP Sheppard in the 1950s, the school encouraged students to remain and complete their O Levels, which led to the creation of a small Sixth Form. In 1979, with the support of the school governors and the local authority, plans were set in motion to significantly increase the school's capacity to 500 boys. This expansion was primarily funded by increased parental contributions for tuition. New boarding houses were constructed to support this growth.

The school became one of the first in the country to adopt Grant Maintained Status. This allowed the institution to retain independent control over its administration and organization, moving beyond the direct authority of the local education authority. However, this status was abolished in 1997 following the election of the new Labour government.

From 2004, Old Swinford Hospital allowed girls to enter the school from sixth form, and in 2021, the school became fully coeducational for the first time in its history with girls admitted from Year 7 onwards. As part of the expansion, the school acquired the former Stourbridge College site in 2019.

== Houses ==
The house system was established in 1929 with three houses using local place names; Stourbridge (briefly also known as School), Kidderminster and Dudley. In 1931 Stourbridge was renamed Foley, Kidderminster became Lyttleton and Dudley was rededicated after the Earls of Dudley (each being the name of a figure in the school history). This remains the basis of the house naming convention ever since.

As of 2025, there are six active boarding houses.

| House | Built | Namesake |
|---|---|---|
| Dudley | 1984 | the Earls of Dudley, the family who bought the Foley's estate of Witley Court |
| Foley | 1982 | Thomas Foley, the founder of the School |
| Foster | 1870s | A prominent local family (see James Foster) |
| Potter | 2009 | Christopher Potter OBE, headmaster from 1978 until 2001 |
| Baxter | 1990 | Richard Baxter, a 17th-century Puritan minister |
| Prospect | c.1900s | Prospect Hill, the house's location |

Former houses include:

| House | Built | Namesake |
|---|---|---|
| Chance | | |
| Lyttelton | | Named after the Lyttelton family who built nearby Hagley Hall |
| Maybury | 1845 | William Maybury, headmaster of the school from 1883-1928 |
| Stone | | HC Stone, headmaster of the school from 1928–1951 |
| Witley | 1983 | Witley Court, the Foley family mansion |

Witley and Maybury's buildings remain on site, however they are either used for other purposes, or are vacant.

== Buildings onsite ==
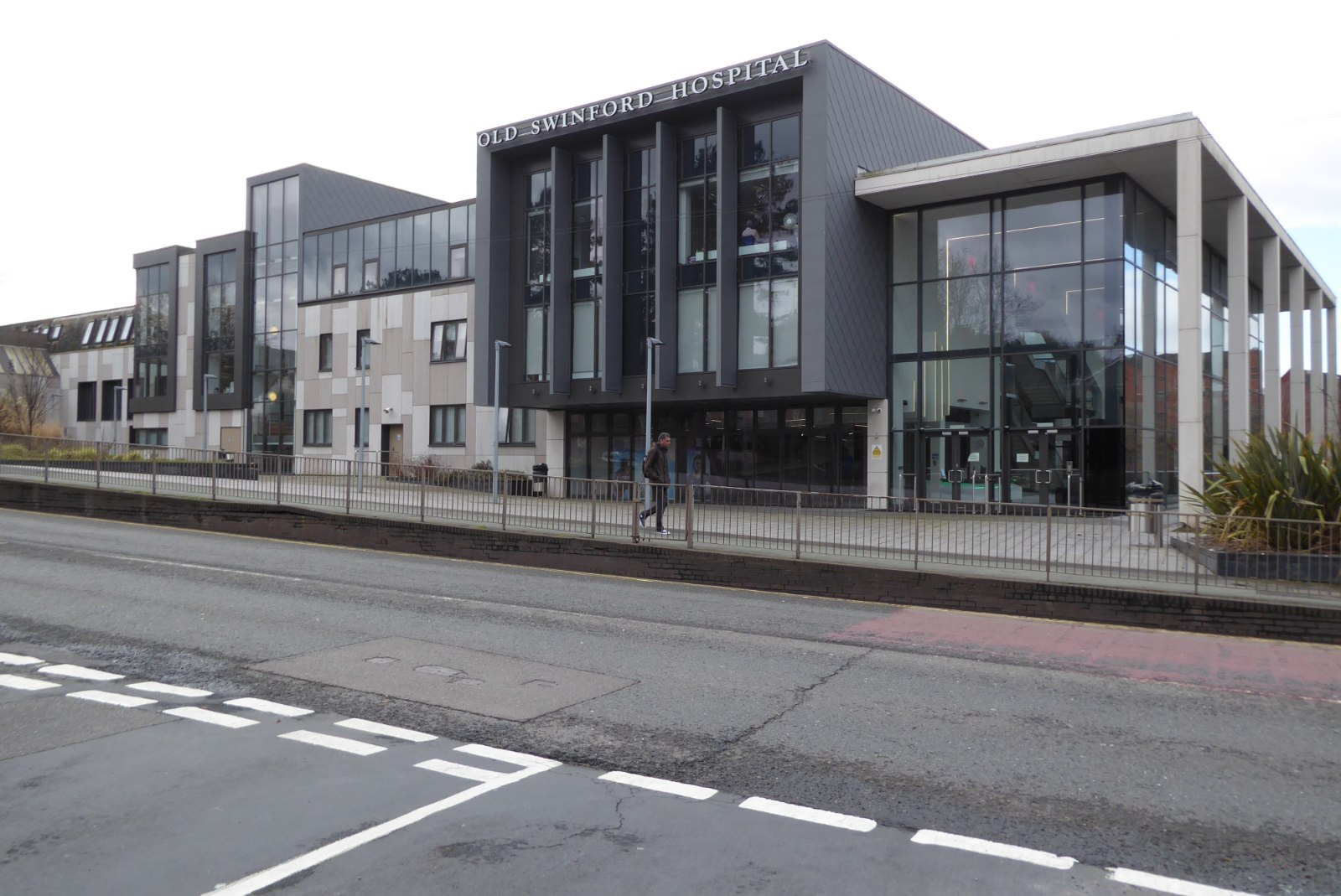
Swinford Court was refurbished in 2014, and sold to OSH in 2019. It now houses the Sixth Form LRC, and classrooms.

There are also classroom buildings onsite. The original building, now known as Founders, is Grade II* listed. It now mainly contains administration offices, with some ICT suites remaining, however, most have been moved to Swinford Court.

Swinford Court was purchased in 2019, after it was controversially listed for sale by BMet, for £3.5 million, only 5 years after renovation. The former site of Stourbridge College is now used for Sixth Form students and lower school students, with it housing the Mathematics department, as well as Computer Science, and social sciences in A-Block. In C-Block, there are Art, Design Technology and Language classrooms. B-Block is rarely used, as the existing facilities are used instead.

Other buildings onsite include the Foleyan Centre, built in the 2010s, and named after Frank Foley, a British Secret Intelligence Service officer who moved to Stourbridge in 1949, and died in 1958.

== Admissions ==
Admission to the school, irrespective of place type, primarily only happens in Years 7 or 12. There is no catchment area and admission is non-selective except for Flexi-Boarders who are subject to an aptitude test for Year 7 entry. Boarding fees and day student facilities are charged but not tuition.

== Academics ==
Old Swinford Hospital is a specialist Business and Enterprise School, a Specialist Science School and has recently been awarded an Artsmark and Sportsmark.

GCSE results in 2024 were above the national average, 87.8% of grades awarded were awarded 9-4, meanwhile 40% achieved grade 7 or above in English and Maths. An average point score of 5.02 per student, mathced with 64.0% achieving 5 subjects at grade 5 or above including English and Maths. For A-Levels in the same year, across 104 students 68.5% achieved grades A*-C in all examinations. The average points per pupil was 94.08 - the UK average was 35.29.

=== Ofsted ===
Old Swinford Hospital is currently rated as Good by Ofsted, as of the most recent inspection in 2022. The school has retained this level since 2010, having previously been rated Outstanding in 2006.

== Sport ==
Sport is a key part of Old Swinford Hospital school, with significant focus on Rugby Union. A number of former pupils have played professionally, and at international level. In 2023, the 1st XV and U15s achieved national champion status having won their respective Continental Tyres Vase Finals at Twickenham.

In addition to Rugby, the school also offer a range of team sports including Basketball, Cricket, Football, Hockey, Netball and Tennis. Previously Badminton, Rounders and Rugby Sevens have also been offered.

The school have extensive sports facilities on-site including numerous sports pitches for rugby, football and cricket, tennis, squash and basketball courts, cricket nets, two gymnasiums and two climbing walls. In recent years Old Swinford Hospital has expanded sports facilities beyond the school. In 2006, plans were submitted to redevelop farmland at Treherns Fields near Hagley. The development caused concern locally, and was approved in 2007. In 2025, the school approached the Ernest Stevens Trust to redevelop part of the Stanley Road Playing Fields in Norton. The school have proposed a £1m investment in new hockey, football and tennis facilities.It was ultimately decided that the new facilities would be built onsite, replacing a former car park. The school also own the land that Stourbridge Golf Club is built and operated from, with a long term lease between the two parties.

== International links ==
Old Swinford Hospital has international links with schools and educational establishments abroad. The three most notable are in the table below. Old Swinford has a history of raising money, and assisting in many ways with St. John's Secondary School in Nandere, Uganda through various charitable events and days and through the Uganda Link society. When the school had power issues in 2007, Old Swinford managed to raise the money needed to get power supplies back within one day.

| School | City |
|---|---|
| (Uganda) St. John's Secondary Senior School | Nandere |
| (Argentina) St. George's College North | Buenos Aires |
| (Australia) St. Joseph's Nudgee College | Brisbane |

== Old Foleyans ==
Former students of the school are called Old Foleyans after the founder of the school, Thomas Foley.

=== Arts ===
- Nicholas Bailey - Actor - performed in Coronation Street, Casualty, EastEnders.
- Charles McKeown - Academy award nominated actor and writer. Films include, Brazil (1985), Spies Like Us, Time Bandits, The Missionary and Life Of Brian.

=== Media ===
- Matthew Chance - Journalist - International correspondent for CNN

=== Military ===
- Roi Wilson - Captain RN

=== Politics ===
- Philip Davies - Conservative MP for Shipley
- Mike Wood - Conservative MP for Dudley South 2015

=== Sport ===
- James Collins- Rugby player for Worcester Warriors
- Rhys Crane - Rugby player for Sale Sharks
- Paul Doran-Jones - Rugby player for England and Northampton Saints
- Simon Green (cricketer)
- Dean Headley - Former England cricketer
- Hannah Payton - Professional cyclist
- Chris Pennell - Rugby player for Worcester Warriors
- George Robson - Rugby player for Harlequins
- Joe Shaw - Rugby player for Newcastle Falcons
- Max Stelling Centre for Worcester Warriors
- Richard West - Former England Rugby Player
- Adam Finch - Professional Cricketer for Worcester Country Cricket
- Ollie Lawrence - Rugby player for Bath & England national rugby union team

=== Other ===
- William Henry Bury - Murderer and Jack the Ripper suspect

== Headmasters since 1667 ==
- Mr W. Broadhurst (1667–1682)
- Mr J. Pearkes (1682–1727)
- Mr T. Hill (1727–1748)
- Mr J. Price (1748–1787)
- Mr E. Sherriff (1787–1802)
- Mr J. Hodges (1802–1818)
- Mr J. Fisher (1818–1835)
- Mr J. Brindley (1835–1839)
- Mr W. Dixon (1839–1846)
- Mr W. Evans (1846–1849)
- Mr J. Anderson (1849–1876)
- Mr T. Pardoe (1876–1883)
- Mr WJ Maybury (1883–1928)
- Mr HC Stone (1928–1951)
- Mr Lawrence Sheppard MBE (1951–1978)
- Mr Christopher Potter OBE (1978–2001)
- Mr Melvyn Roffe (2001–2007)
- Mr Peter Jones (2007–2014)
- Mr Paul Kilbride (2014–2026)
- Mr Graeme Wright (2026-present)

== See also ==
- Old Swinford Hospital RFC
