= Exeat =

Education term

The Latin word exeat ("he/she may leave") is most commonly used to describe a period of absence from a centre of learning.

== In Britain ==
Exeat is used in Britain to describe leave of absence from a boarding school.

It is also used at certain colleges to define a required note to take absence -- such as for entire days, parts of a day, for appointments, interviews, open days and other fixtures. Students at Oxford University, Cambridge University, and other British universities have in the past also been required to obtain such permission to leave college overnight, though such regulations are now less stringent.

== In the Commonwealth ==
A similar method of exeat notifications is used in many Commonwealth schools. It is common for Australian schools to call the long weekends of leave enjoyed by boarders an exeat weekend. This results in the boarding house closing for the weekend. This typically involves an extra day of leave associated with a public holiday to create a long weekend.

In New Zealand or South Africa, an exeat may refer to a period of day leave from a school. This is used as a way to record the coming and going of students from the campus.

== See also ==
- List of Latin phrases (E)
