= Ben Jones (rugby union, born 1983) =

Ben Jones (born 21 February 1983) is an English rugby union who played for Worcester Warriors in the Guinness Premiership in the 2008/09 season. He currently plays for Birmingham & Solihull.

Ben was a member of the England Sevens squad during the 2008/2009 season and is the brother of Simon Jones.

He plays as a scrum-half.
