= Witton Park =

Coordinates: 54.6663°N 1.7335°W

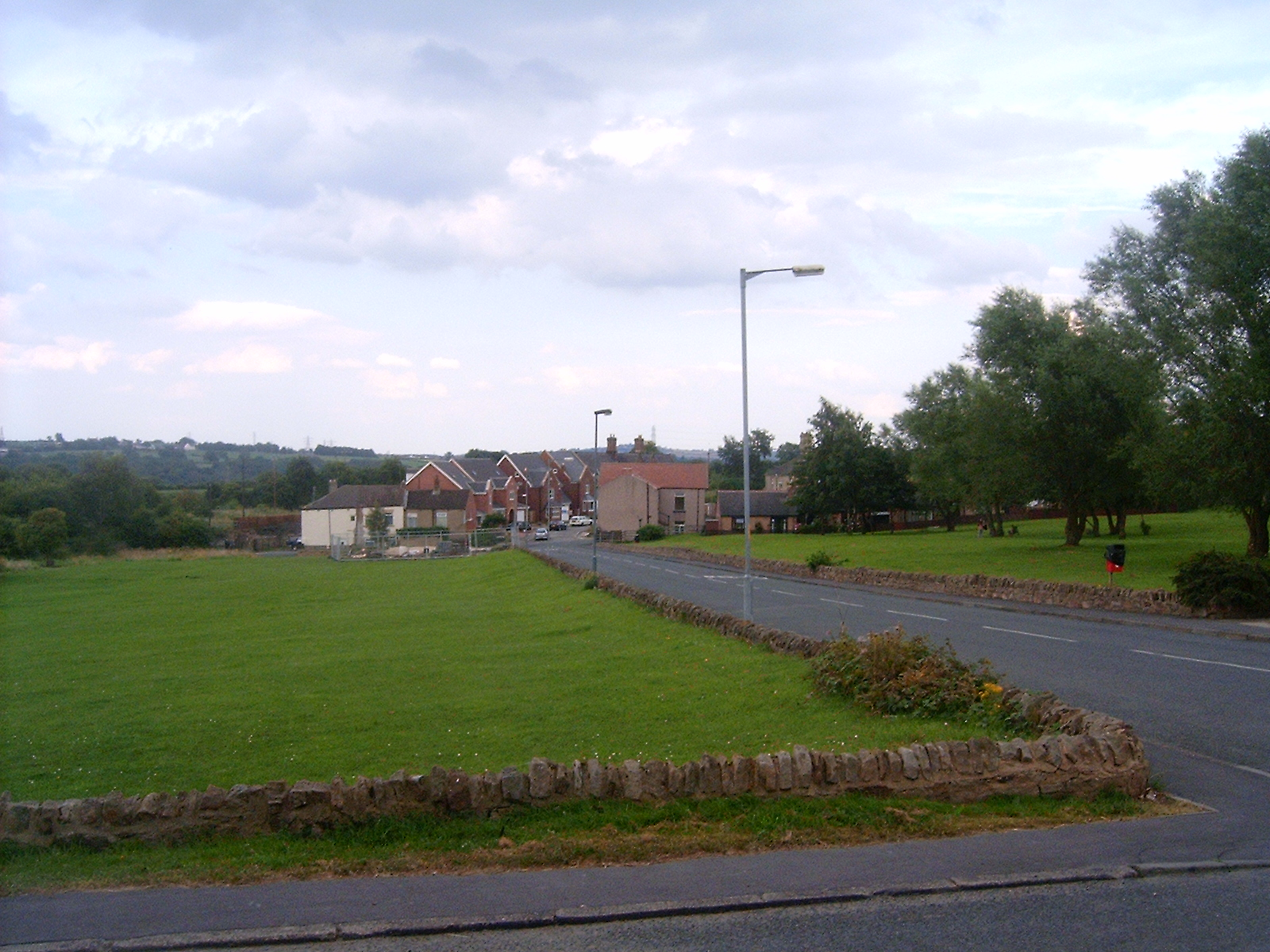
- Low Queen Street in Witton Park

- Location within County Durham
- Population: 384 (2001)
- OS grid reference: NZ208294
  - London: 227 mi (365 km) SbE
- Unitary authority: County Durham
- Ceremonial county: Durham
- Region: North East
- Country: England
- Sovereign state: United Kingdom
- Post town: BISHOP AUCKLAND
- Postcode district: DL14
- Dialling code: 01388
- Police: Durham
- Fire: County Durham and Darlington
- Ambulance: North East
- UK Parliament: Bishop Auckland

Witton Park is a village in County Durham, in England. It is situated to the west of Bishop Auckland. In 2001 it had a population of 384.

== Famous people born in Witton Park ==
- Brigadier General Roland Boys Bradford VC — recipient of the Victoria Cross and youngest ever Brigadier General in the British Army at 25. Younger brother of George Bradford, making them the only brothers to both be awarded the VC medal during the First World War.
- Lieutenant Commander George Nicholson Bradford VC (23 April 1887 – 23 April 1918) - recipient of the Victoria Cross. Elder brother of Roland Bradford, making them the only brothers to both be awarded the VC medal during the First World War.
- Hebrew scholar Thomas Witton Davies raised and educated in Witton Park
- Henry Bolckow, the German partner of Bolckow Vaughan became a Member of Parliament as did Witton Park (and later Bishop Auckland) tradesman Ben Spoor.
- Frederick Lewis, 1st Baron Essendon World shipping magnate was born and lived in Dents Villas.
