= RFU National Schools Cup =

English school rugby union competition

The National Schools Cup (currently known as the Continental Tyres Schools Cup for sponsorship reasons) are a set of annual English schools' rugby union cup competitions, with the U18 Cup being the main competition. The finals of the Cup and Vase competitions are held at Twickenham Stadium, whilst finals for the Plate and Bowl competitions are held at another venue, usually of a Premiership Club. Cup and Vase Semi-finals are also held at a neutral venues. Competitions are held at the U18 and U15 age group levels. At each age level there are several competitions.

All fixtures, results and match reports posted on The Rugby Football Union's website. Up until 2015–16, the Vase was awarded for both age groups in a secondary competition for schools knocked out in the early rounds of the Cup. Since 2016–17, the Cup and Vase competition in both age groups have been separated, with those eliminated in the first round of the Cup going down into the Plate competition, with those eliminated in the first round of the Vase competition going down to the Bowl competition.

== Format ==
Games are played in a direct knockout format, with 8 regions of up to 32 teams each depending on the competition. Teams in the Cup and Vase are decided based on previous years results, with stronger teams entering the Cup, and weaker teams entering the Vase. Round 1 losers of the Cup and Vase drop down to the Plate and Bowl respectively. After the 8 regional teams are decided, a set of national Quarter-Finals, Semi-Finals and Finals follow, with the Final being between a Southern (Southwest and London & South East) region and Northern (North and Midlands) region team.

U18 competitions complete Rounds 1 to 5 and the national Quarter Final before Christmas, with the Semi-Final and Final rounds following in March. At U15 level, Rounds 1 to 4 are completed before Christmas, with Round 5 in January, Quarter-Finals in February, and Semi-Final and Final in March.

== List of Cup Finals ==
The U18 Cup commenced in the 1990-91 season, and has been the 1st tier tournament throughout, except for between 2014 and 2020, whereby it was the 2nd tier tournament.

=== Winners ===
Year	Winner	Score	Runner-up
1991	King Edward VI School, Stratford-upon-Avon	4-3	Bishop Wordsworth's School
1992	Bradford Grammar School	30-2	Mount St Mary's College
1993	Bradford Grammar School	74-17	RGS Guildford
1994	Mount St Mary's College	17-13	RGS Newcastle
1995	Colston's School	23-0	Queen Elizabeth Grammar School, Wakefield
1996	Colston's School	20-0	Queen Elizabeth Grammar School, Wakefield
1997	Colston's School	23-12	Kirkham Grammar School
1998	Colston's School	21-19	RGS High Wycombe
1999	Colston's School	42-17	RGS High Wycombe
2000	Colston's School	33-0	Queen Elizabeth Grammar School, Wakefield
2001	The Campion School	18-0	Durham School
2002	Oakham School	28-23	The Campion School
2003	Oakham School	30-28	Barnard Castle School
2004	Colston's School	48-0	Barnard Castle School
2005	Exeter College, Exeter	25-23	St Peter's School, York
2006	St Peter's High School, Gloucester	26-17	Durham School
2007	Warwick School	24-23	Barnard Castle School
2008	Wellington College, Berkshire	7-3	St Benedict's School, Ealing
2009	Truro College	39-18	St Peter's High School, Gloucester
2010	Whitgift School	34-10	Royal Grammar School, Newcastle
2011	Whitgift School	45-24	Oakham School
2012	Dulwich College	15-8	Old Swinford Hospital
2013	Dulwich College	27-17	Northampton School for Boys
2014	Dulwich College	53-5	Warwick School
2015	Bromsgrove School	30-18	Dulwich College
2016	Bromsgrove School	18-10	Queen Elizabeth Grammar School, Wakefield
2017	Warwick School	27-5	Bishop Wordsworth's School
2018	Warwick School	29-7	Queen Elizabeth Grammar School, Wakefield
2019	Whitgift School	32-22	Warwick School
2020	Whitgift School & Warwick School	Final cancelled due to the COVID-19 pandemic in the United Kingdom	
2021	Competition cancelled due to the COVID-19 pandemic in the United Kingdom		
2022	Trinity School	15-10	Kirkham Grammar School
2023	Oakham School	31-24	Trinity School
2024	Harrow School	29-27	Kirkham Grammar School
2025	Harrow School	22-14	Queen Elizabeth Grammar School, Wakefield
2026	Northampton School for Boys	36-20	Epsom College

=== Results by School ===
School	Winners	Runners-up	Years won	Years Runners-up
Colston's School	7	0	1994-95, 1995–96, 1996–97, 1997–98, 1998–99, 1999-2000, 2003-04	
Warwick School	4	2	2006-07, 2016–17, 2017–18, 2019-20 (shared)	2013-14, 2018–19
Whitgift School	4	0	2009-10, 2010–11, 2018–19, 2019-20 (shared)	
Oakham School	3	1	2001-02, 2002-03, 2022-23	2010-11
Dulwich College	3	1	2011-12, 2012–13, 2013-14	2014-15
Harrow School	2	0	2023-24, 2024-25	
Bromsgrove School	2	0	2014-15, 2015-16	
Bradford Grammar School	2	0	1991-92, 1992-93	
Northampton School for Boys	1	1	2025-26	2012-13
Trinity School	1	1	2021-22	2022-23
The Campion School	1	1	2000-01	2001-02
Mount St Mary's College	1	1	1993-94	1991-92
St Peter's High School, Gloucester	1	1	2005-06	2008-09
Truro College	1	0	2008-09	
Wellington College, Berkshire	1	0	2007-08	
Exeter College, Exeter	1	0	2004-05	
King Edward VI School, Stratford-upon-Avon	1	0	1990-91	
Queen Elizabeth Grammar School, Wakefield	0	6		1994-95, 1995–96, 1999-2000, 2015–16, 2017–18, 2024-25
Barnard Castle School	0	3		2002-03, 2004–05, 2006–07
Kirkham Grammar School	0	3		1996-97, 2021–22, 2023-24
Bishop Wordsworth's School	0	2		1990-91, 2016–17
Durham School	0	2		2000-01, 2005–06
Royal Grammar School, Newcastle	0	2		1993-94, 2009–10
Royal Grammar School, High Wycombe	0	2		1997-98, 1998–99
Epsom College	0	1		2025-26
Old Swinford Hospital School	0	1		2011-12
St Benedict's School, Ealing	0	1		2007-08
St Peter's School, York	0	1		2004-05
Royal Grammar School, Guildford	0	1		1992-93

== Other Competitions ==
=== U18 Champions Trophy ===
This competition was introduced in the 2014-15 season. This became the 1st tier tournament for the U18 section until its abolishment after the 2019-20 season final.

Year	Winner	Score	Runner-up
2014	Millfield School	31-24	Grammar School at Leeds
2015	Bedford School	28-21	Epsom College
2016	Tonbridge School	17-10	Bedford School
2017	Dulwich College	39-24	Blundell's School
2018	Wellington College	24-16	Epsom College
2019	Wellington College	41-19	Rugby School

The competition was abolished after the 2019-20 season final.

=== U18 Plate ===
The U18 Plate was introduced in the 2016-17 season, and is for teams that lose in the 1st round of the Cup. It is currently the 2nd tier tournament.

Year	Winner	Score	Runner-up
2017	Reigate Grammar School	20-16	Solihull School
2018	Woodhouse Grove School	36-14	Trinity School
2019	Bloxham School	28-21	Sherborne School
2020	Dean Close School & Bloxham School	Final cancelled due to the COVID-19 pandemic in the United Kingdom	
2021	Competition cancelled due to the COVID-19 pandemic in the United Kingdom		
2022	Stowe School	36-22	King's College School, Wimbledon
2023	Royal Grammar School, High Wycombe	27-24	Barnard Castle School
2024	Cardinal Newman Catholic School, Hove	15-7	Uppingham School
2025	Dauntsey's School	55-35	St Anselm's College
2026	Oakham School	38-24	Taunton School

=== U18 Vase ===
The U18 Vase was introduced in the 1995/96 season, originally as the U18 Plate, before becoming the U18 vase in the 1998/99 season. It was originally meant for teams exiting the first few rounds of the Cup, but since 2016-17, the vase has been for weaker teams, with 1st round losers going into the U18 Bowl. It is currently the 3rd tier tournament.

Year	Winner	Score	Runner-up
1996	John Cleveland College	8-5	Langley Park School for Boys
1997	Bromsgrove School	36-12	Dauntsey's School
1998	Royal Grammar School, Guildford	25-16	Merchant Taylors' School, Crosby
1999	Bablake School	24-14	Bournemouth School
2000	Wallington County Grammar School	16-9	Lymm High School
2001	King Henry VIII School, Coventry	14-5	Stowe School
2002	The Sixth Form School, Solihull	15-13	St Bartholomew's School
2003	Hall Cross Academy	21-12	Coopers' Company and Coborn School
2004	Prince Henry's Grammar School	18-11	St Columba's College
2005	Crossley Heath School	10-3	St Joseph's College, Stoke-on-Trent
2006	Lymm High School	27-8	London Leisure College
2007	Ermysted's Grammar School	3-0	Wilmslow High School
2008	Sussex Downs College	14-13	Queen Elizabeth Grammar School, Penrith
2009	John Cleveland College	23-15	Hampton School
2010	Sandbach School	14-3	Norwich School
2011	Solihull School	28-21	St George's College, Weybridge
2012	The Leys School	16-8	Ravens Wood School
2013	Yarm School	17-15	Felsted School
2014	Trent College	17-16	Exeter College
2015	Churcher's College	13-5	SEEVIC College
2016	Northampton School for Boys	17-12	St Ambrose College
2017	Trent College	43-7	The Royal Latin School
2018	Langley School	48-22	Wirral Grammar School for Boys
2019	Samuel Whitbread Academy	43-25	Dauntsey's School
2020	Newcastle School for Boys & Sutton Valence School	Final cancelled due to the COVID-19 pandemic in the United Kingdom	
2021	Competition cancelled due to the COVID-19 pandemic in the United Kingdom		
2022	Mount St Mary's College	3-0	Sutton Valence School
2023	Old Swinford Hospital	33-33 (Note: Old Swinford Hospital win on tiebreaker; first try scored)	Samuel Whitbread Academy
2024	Felsted School	42-19	Ivybridge Community College
2025	The King's School, Gloucester	29-16	King Edward's School, Birmingham
2026	Maidstone Grammar School	22-21	Dame Allan's Schools

=== U18 Bowl ===
The U18 Bowl was introduced in the 2016-17 season, and is for teams that lose in the 1st round of the Vase. It is currently the 4th tier tournament.

Year	Winner	Score	Runner-up
2017	Old Swinford Hospital	25-13	St Olave's Grammar School
2018	St George's College, Weybridge	36-10	Samuel Whitbread Academy
2019	The King's School, Worcester	34-10	Glyn School
2020	Ampleforth College & Worthing College	Final cancelled due to the COVID-19 pandemic in the United Kingdom	
2021	Competition cancelled due to the COVID-19 pandemic in the United Kingdom		
2022	Nottingham High School	29-16	Eastbourne College
2023	Harrogate Grammar School	31-20	St Peter's High School, Gloucester
2024	Richard Hale School	26-17	Richard Huish College
2025	Hayes School	53-26	The King's School, Ely
2026	Hymers College	32-28	Gravesend Grammar School

=== U15 Cup ===
The U15 Cup was introduced in the 1987-88 season, and was the 1st competition out of the current set competitions.

Year	Winner	Score	Runner-up
1988	Royal Grammar School, Guildford	12-0	Wellington College
1989	Rossall School	11-10	RGS High Wycombe
1990	Bradford Grammar School	30-4	King Edward VII and Queen Mary School
1991	Bristol Grammar School	8-6	Bedford Modern School
1992	The Skinners' School	19-6	The London Oratory School
1993	King Edward's School, Birmingham	11-10	St Benedict's School, Ealing
1994	Wellington College & Bedford School	3-3	Match ended in a draw
1995	Dulwich College	37-0	Bristol Grammar School
1996	RGS High Wycombe	17-13	Wellington College
1997	RGS High Wycombe	29-13	Whitgift School
1998	RGS High Wycombe & Queen Elizabeth Grammar School, Wakefield	5-5	Match ended in a draw
1999	Whitgift School	18-12	Wellington College
2000	Wellington College, Berkshire	16-0	Bramhall High School
2001	Epsom College	17-12	The John Fisher School
2002	St Peter's School, York	16-17	Outwood Grange Academy
2003	Whitgift School	24-7	Millfield School
2004	John Cleveland College	17-12	Sherborne School
2005	St Benedict's School, Ealing	12-7	St Paul's School, Barnes
2006	Bedford School	16-13	Queen Elizabeth Grammar School, Wakefield
2007	Lymm High School	20-15	St Paul's School, Barnes
2008	Wellington College	22-15	Millfield School
2009	Millfield School	34-15	The Judd School
2010	Wilmslow High School	10-7	Wellington College
2011	RGS High Wycombe	17-15	Truro School
2012	Grammar School at Leeds	17-12	RGS High Wycombe
2013	Warwick School	12-6	Queen Elizabeth Grammar School, Wakefield
2014	Warwick School	17-0	Queen Elizabeth Grammar School, Wakefield
2015	Queen Elizabeth Grammar School, Wakefield	15-6	Warwick School
2016	Sedbergh School	24-17	Wellington College, Berkshire
2017	Wellington College	25-12	Warwick School
2018	Whitgift School	22-12	The Manchester Grammar School
2019	Wellington College	23-5	Northampton School for Boys
2020	Ivybridge Community College & Stowe School	Final cancelled due to the COVID-19 pandemic in the United Kingdom	
2021	Competition cancelled due to the COVID-19 pandemic in the United Kingdom		
2022	Wellington College	31-8	Queen Elizabeth Grammar School, Wakefield
2023	Northampton School for Boys	38-21	King's College School, Wimbledon
2024	Radley College	24-12	Northampton School for Boys
2025	Northampton School for Boys	22-5	Lord Wandsworth College
2026	Whitgift School	32-26	Northampton School for Boys

=== U15 Plate ===
The U15 Plate was introduced in the 2016-17 season, and is for teams that lose in the 1st round of the Cup. It is currently the 2nd tier tournament.

Year	Winner	Score	Runner-up
2017	Sir Thomas Rich's School	6-3	St Pauls School, Barnes
2018	Dr Challoner's Grammar School	31-7	Brighton College
2019	Trinity School	45-5	Hymers College
2020	Marlborough College & Rugby School	Final cancelled due to the COVID-19 pandemic in the United Kingdom	
2021	Competition cancelled due to the COVID-19 pandemic in the United Kingdom		
2022	Stamford School	26-24	The Oratory School
2023	The King's School, Worcester	36-12	Abingdon School
2024	Cranleigh School	31-10	Hymers College
2025	Radley College	32-17	Kirkham Grammar School
2026	Sandbach School	31-15	Royal Grammar School, Guildford

=== U15 Vase ===
The U15 Vase was introduced in the 2003/04 season. It was originally meant for teams exiting the first few rounds of the Cup, but since 2016-17, the Vase has been for weaker teams, with 1st round losers going into the U15 Bowl. It is currently the 3rd tier tournament.

Year	Winner	Score	Runner-up
2004	St Benedict's RC High School	24-15	Lawrence Sheriff School
2005	Maidstone Grammar School	33-7	Oakham School
2006	Langley Park School for Boys	27-12	John Cleveland College
2007	Woodhouse Grove School	27-3	Solihull School
2008	Langley Park School for Boys	8-7	Calday Grange Grammar School
2009	The Leys School	25-3	The King's School, Macclesfield
2010	Lymm High School	24-10	Brighton College
2011	Saffron Walden County High School	32-14	Harrogate Grammar School
2012	Dauntsey's School	17-5	Sir Thomas Rich's School
2013	Royal Latin School	19-13	Felsted School
2014	Altrincham Grammar School for Boys	12-10	Graveney School
2015	Sherborne School	34-24	Oakham School
2016	Dr Challoner's Grammar School	19-10	Sir Thomas Rich's School
2017	The Thomas Hardye School	62-10	Dr Challoners Grammar School
2018	Beechen Cliff School	36-14	Kenilworth School
2019	Samuel Whitbread Academy	22-7	Dartford Grammar School
2020	Northampton School for Boys & St John's School, Leatherhead	Final cancelled due to the COVID-19 pandemic in the United Kingdom	
2021	Competition cancelled due to the COVID-19 pandemic in the United Kingdom		
2022	Hitchin Boys School	11-0	Torquay Boys' Grammar School
2023	Old Swinford Hospital	40-21	Chislehurst and Sidcup Grammar School
2024	Beechen Cliff School	45-7	Durham School
2025	St Pauls School	32-3	The Bishop's Stortford High School
2026	Wirral Grammar School for Boys	32-19	Claires Court School

=== U15 Bowl ===
The U15 Bowl was introduced in the 2016-17 season, and is for teams that lose in the 1st round of the Vase. It is currently the 4th tier tournament.

Year	Winner	Score	Runner-up
2017	Beths Grammar School	37-27	Pocklington School
2018	Saffron Walden County High School	19-10	Worth School
2019	Judd School	27-10	Hutton Grammar School
2020	King Henry VIII School, Coventry & Warden Park School	Final cancelled due to the COVID-19 pandemic in the United Kingdom	
2021	Competition cancelled due to the COVID-19 pandemic in the United Kingdom		
2022	Hill House School	19-17	Poole Grammar School
2023	Prince Henry's Grammar School, Otley	45-14	St Peter's High School, Gloucester
2024	Reading Blue Coat School	22-12	Gordon's School
2025	Plymouth College	36-10	Wymondham College
2026	Embley School	40-17	Richard Hale School
