= Joe Shaw (rugby union) =

English rugby union player

- Born: Joe Shaw; 20 February 1980 (age 46) Birmingham, England
- Height: 6 ft 0 in (1.83 m)
- Weight: 15 st 2 lb (96 kg)
- School: Old Swinford Hospital

Rugby union career
- Position(s): Fullback, Centre, Wing
Senior career
Years	Team	Apps	(Points)
1998-2000	Sale	8	(18)
2000-2002	Northampton Saints	16	(20)
2002-2008	Newcastle Falcons	83	(52)
International career
Years	Team	Apps	(Points)
- England Under 21 England Under 19 England Under 18
National sevens team
Years	Team		Comps
- England
Coaching career
- Years: Team
- Northampton Ladies
- –: Newcastle University
- –: South Shields Westoe
- –: Kowloon
- –: Hong Kong
- –: Saracens

Joe Shaw born 20 February 1980 in Birmingham, West Midlands, England is a rugby union player and coach.

== Playing career ==
Born in the West Midlands, Shaw played for Sale Sharks as a youngster. He won England representative honours at Under-18s, 19s and 21s, and was in the full England sevens squad in 2001.

Shaw was a utility player, his broad range of skills saw him play at fullback, in the centres and on the wing.

Shaw joined the Newcastle Falcons in the Guinness Premiership from Northampton Saints in the summer of 2002.

He scored a try for the Falcons in a win against Sale at Twickenham during the 2004 Powergen Cup.

A recurring ankle injury picked up early in the campaign saw him miss much of the 2004/5 season, restricting him to six starts and five outings from the bench.

Shaw used his time away from playing rugby to help the Falcons Community Foundation to good effect, winning the Falcons community award six years in a row from 2003 to 2009, while he was also named Powergen Community Player of the Season for 2006–2007. Furthermore, was the first rugby player inducted into the Show Racism the Red Card charity.

== Coaching career ==
Away from the Falcons, Shaw coached local side Westoe RFC, from 2003 to 2009 along with former Falcons star Richard Arnold. Winning three league titles, two County Cups and reached the final of the Powergen Intermediate Cup. Upon leaving Newcastle Falcons in 2009 he became head coach of the bottom of the league Kowloon Rugby Club, finishing top in 2012; Shaw also became Hong Kong's national coach.

He is now the head coach of Saracens Rugby Club. Shaw headed up the successful A League and LV Cup teams in 2015, and is part of the coaching team that helped secure the 2015, 2016, 2018, 2019 and 2022 Premiership titles and the 2016, 2017 and 2019 European Champions Cup titles. He also led the club to the 2020 Greene King IPA Championship title.

Additionally, Shaw has earned an MSc in coaching science, writing his dissertation on the philosophy of player centered coaching.
