= Ed Williamson (rugby union) =

English rugby union player (born 1984)

- Born: Edward John Marshall Williamson; March 31, 1984 (age 42) Teesside, England
- Height: 1.91 m (6 ft 3 in)
- Weight: 110 kg (17 st 5 lb)
- School: Barnard Castle

Rugby union career
- Position: Flanker/No.8
- Current team: Union athletic Libournaise
Senior career
Years	Team	Apps	(Points)
	Newcastle Falcons	88	(10)
–	Leeds Carnegie	60	(20)
–	London Welsh	11	(1)
–	Rotherham Titans(player/coach)	18	(0)
–	Bishop Auckland RFC(youth)		
International career
Years	Team	Apps	(Points)
2003	England U19, England 7s		

Ed Williamson (born 31 March 1984 in Teesside, England) is a professional contemporary artist and former professional rugby union player. He retired in 2016 after playing for Union Athletic Libournaise. Williamson started his career with Newcastle Falcons who he had played for since the age of 18. He made his first team debut in the 2004/2005 season against Leicester Tigers. He went on to play over 80 games for the club. He has represented England at the U19 level.

Following a serious injury to his hand in an A League game for Falcons against Northampton Saints, Williamson was forced into retirement at the end of the 2010/2011 season. However, with the support of the Rugby Players Association (RPA) and further surgery, Williamson was miraculously able to return to rugby in February 2012 for Leeds Carnegie where he put in several man of the match performances.

At the start of the 2012/13, season he reentered the Premiership with the newly promoted London Welsh RFC[2]

He joined Rotherham Titans as a player and as forwards coach ahead of the 2013/14 season. It was to be an impressive season for the club, finishing 4th in the league, reaching the playoffs and also the knockout stages of the B&I cup for the 1st time in Rotherham's history. Williamson played a big part and received heavy praise for his defensive work with the team, including some impressive performances on the field.

Williamson played for French Federàl 1 side UA Libournaise for the 14/15 and 15/16 seasons.

He is now a professional contemporary artist, still living and working in Dublin, Ireland . He has exhibited his work around the world, including in major shows in New York, Miami and Monaco. His work can be viewed on his website www.edwilliamsonart.com or on his Instagram @williamsonartofficial. Ed is heavily involved in charity, and regularly donates his time and his paintings to a selection of charitable foundations.

Ed is the son of Jack Williamson, a local revolutionary political activist in the North East. He is also the nephew of Richard Marshall, a local artist. Williamson is father to four children. He is married to Dr Beverley Williamson (nee Holmes), a competition law specialist.
