= List of areas in Dudley =

This is a list of areas in the borough of Dudley, West Midlands, England.

== A ==
- Amblecote

== B ==
- Baptist End
- Brierley Hill
- Brockmoor
- Bromley
- Buckpool

== C ==
- Cradley
- Coseley
- Cotwall End
- Darby End

== D ==
- Dixon's Green
- Dudley

== E ==
- Eve Hill

== G ==
- Gornal
- Gornal Wood

== H ==
- Halesowen
- Hasbury
- Hayley Green
- Holly Hall
- Hurst Green
- Hurst Hill

== K ==
- Kates Hill
- Kingswinford

== I ==
- Illey

== L ==
- Lapal
- London Fields
- Lower Gornal
- Lutley
- Lye

== M ==
Mushroom Green

== N ==
- Netherton
- Norton

== O ==
Oakham

== P ==
- Pedmore
- Pensnett
- Primrose Hill

== Q ==
- Quarry Bank

== R ==
- Roseville
- Russells Hall

== S ==
- Sedgley
- Stourbridge

== T ==
- Tividale

== U ==
- Upper Gornal

== W ==
- Wallbrook
- Wall Heath
- Woodsetton
- Woodside
- Wren's Nest Estate
