= Wollescote =

Residential area of Stourbridge, West Midlands, England

Coordinates: 52.445°N 2.111°W

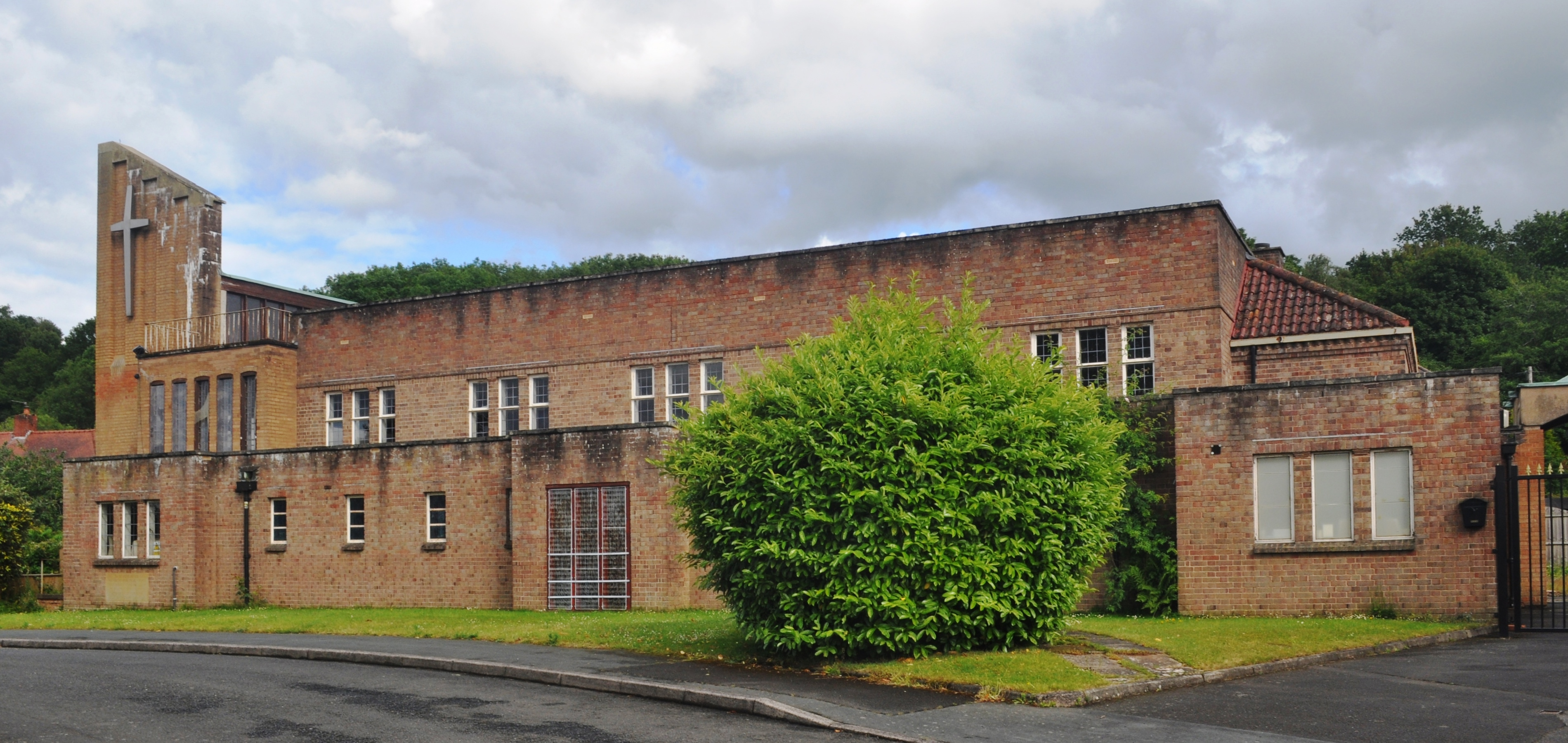
- St Andrew's Church

- Location within the West Midlands
- Metropolitan borough: Dudley
- Metropolitan county: West Midlands
- Region: West Midlands
- Country: England
- Sovereign state: United Kingdom
- Police: West Midlands
- Fire: West Midlands
- Ambulance: West Midlands

Wollescote is a residential area of Stourbridge, in the Dudley district, in the county of the West Midlands, England. It falls within the ward of Cradley and Wollescote and the parliamentary constituency of Halesowen.

It is situated three miles east of the town centre of Stourbridge. It shares a border to the East with the town of Halesowen.

It is bordered by the areas of Lye, Pedmore, Cradley and Hayley Green.

== Housing ==
The area was predominantly rural until the 1920s, when it was developed as a dense residential area. It now includes a varied mix of private and council housing, most of which was built after the Second World War.

== History ==
The area dates back to 1282 when it is referred to as the hamlet of 'Wlfrecote'. The name 'Wollescote' is derived from the Saxon 'Wulhere's cot'. The early 1282 records of the area tell of a family named, Agnes and Walter DeWlfrecote.

Thomas Milward lived in Wollescote in the 17th century at Wollescote Hall. He was known as a supporter of the king during the English Civil War. In 1643 he offered Prince Rupert the hall as his base. The prince escaped to the hall after his loss at the Battle of Stourbridge Common and Thomas subsequently hid him in an old well.

During the 1900s a locally well-known and wealthy industrialist by the name of Ernest Stevens created his wealth in the enamelled holloware trade. His ware was manufactured in nearby Cradley Heath and sold under the "Judge" trademark. Ernest Stevens lived in Wollescote Hall and went on to gift the hall to the people of Wollescote as an act of philanthropy.

Wollescote was formerly a township in the parish of Old Swinford, in 1866 Wollescote became a separate civil parish, on 1 April 1974 the parish was abolished. In 1951 the parish had a population of 6169.

== Wollescote Hall ==
Wollescote Hall is a large three storey house situated within Stevens Park in Wollescote. The hall dates back to the early 17th century. In 1971 Historic England added the hall to the heritage category of a listed building and is grade II listed. Under the Planning (Listed Buildings and Conservation Areas) Act 1990 the building is noted for its special architectural or historic interest.

Throughout history the hall has been home to several wealthy families, notably the Millwards, who owned the hall for over 340 years from 1508 until it was sold in 1848. The hall was later bought by a wealthy local industrialist Ernest Stevens in the early 1900s and the Stevens family lived in the hall until 1930.

Ernest Stevens gifted the hall to the people of Lye and Wollescote in 1930 under the stipulation that the hall be used for the benefit of the local community.

In 1971 the hall was rented out to the Worcester Education Department for use as an annex for the Foley College Art Department. After the college left the hall, the site declined considerable and in 1991 renovation work commenced and the hall is now used by both the Lye and Wollescote Sons of Rest, and the Friends of Wollescote Park.

== Stevens Park ==
Stevens Park (also known locally as 'Wollescote Park') is a 27-hectare (67-acre) site with recreational facilities, flower beds and grassed areas. The park holds an elevated position and as such is afforded some spectacular far-reaching views of the surrounding countryside and the Black Country. Ludgbridge Brook lies in the lower northeastern section of the park and is lined with mature willow and alder trees. The brook area provides a habitat for numerous types of wildlife.

=== Facilities ===
- Children's play area and picnic benches
- Multi-use games area
- Crown and Flat Green Bowls
- Large areas of flat managed grass
- Smaller areas of shaded and unshaded grass
- Managed pathways
- Tennis courts x 3
- Walled garden (managed in association with Black Country Mental Health)
- Sensory Garden, a 'Community Green Flag Award' Winner 2023 and 2024 (managed by the Friends of Wollescote Park)
- Car Parking

== Education ==
There are two Primary Schools in the Wollescote area.

- Hob Green Primary School
- Wollescote Primary School.

There is no Secondary school in Wollescote and as such children in the area transfer to nearby secondary schools such as The Pedmore High School, Redhill School, Old Swinford Hospital School and Thorns Collegiate Academy.

== Recreation and groups ==
=== Recreation ===
- large playing field, which is maintained as a cricket pitch.

(Located opposite Stevens Park on the other side of Wollescote Road.)

=== Groups ===
- Wollescote Scout Group

The group use the Queensway base and meet once a week.

- The Friends of Wollescote Park

The Group meet regularly at the Sons of Rest room at Wollescote Hall and on Tuesday mornings in the Sensory garden.
