= Lye and Wollescote Cemetery =

Cemetery in Lye, West Midlands, England

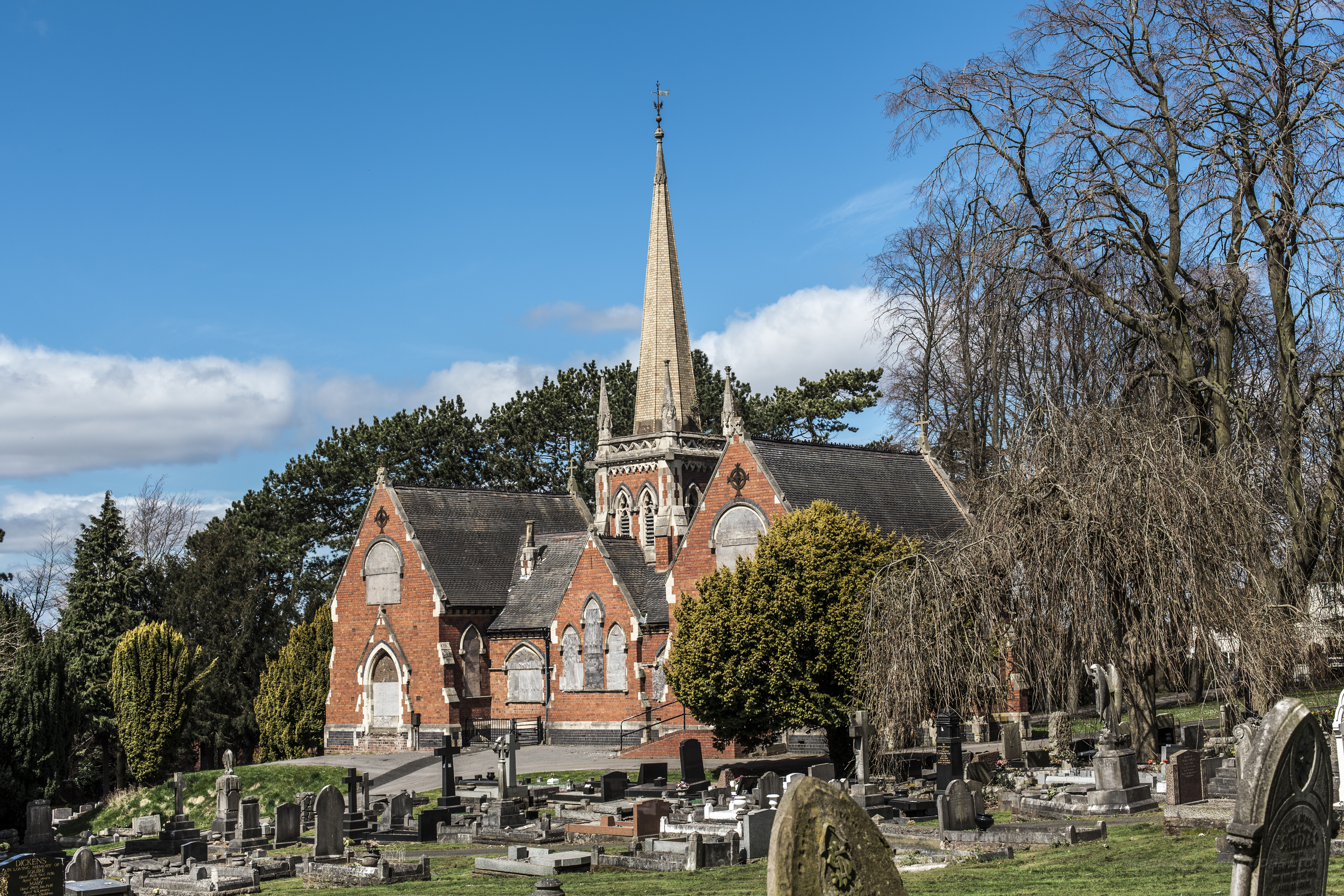
- The chapels in April 2013
- Interactive map of Lye and Wollescote Cemetery

Details
- Established: 1879
- Location: Cemetery Road, Lye, Stourbridge, England
- Country: United Kingdom
- Coordinates: 52.4532°N 2.1151°W
- Owned by: Dudley Metropolitan Borough Council
- Size: 9.45 acres (3.82 ha)
- Website: www.dudley.gov.uk
- Find a Grave: Lye and Wollescote Cemetery

The Lye and Wollescote Cemetery is an active 9.45 acres (3.82 ha) cemetery in Lye, West Midlands, England.

== History ==
The cemetery was opened in 1879 by the Lye and Wollescote Burial Board and was taken over by Dudley Metropolitan Borough Council in 1933, however its chapels have been closed for many years.

== Chapels ==
The Lye and Wollescote Cemetery Chapels building in the centre of the cemetery (originally called the Mortuary Chapels) was built in 1879 and is a Grade II listed building. It had two chapels, at opposite ends of the building; the nonconformist chapel was closed in the 1970s and the Church of England chapel closed following a fire in 1993. The West Midlands Historic Buildings Trust received a grant from the Heritage Lottery Fund to take full ownership of the building in March 2014. The trust planned to conserve the chapels and to bring them back into use as a venue for civil ceremonies. This project also aimed to create resources to encourage people to discover more about their local heritage and nature conservation, in particular via a resource-pack for schools and a nature trail. The refurbishment was completed in early 2016, the building is now in use as a secular registration office and has been renamed as the Thomas Robinson Building.

== War Graves ==
There are 25 Commonwealth service personnel buried in the cemetery in graves maintained by the Commonwealth War Graves Commission, 15 from World War I and 10 from World War II. As part of the restoration plan, an illustrated book telling the stories of the 29 soldiers connected with the cemetery (15 buried in Commonwealth War Graves and 14 others killed in action who are commemorated on family graves and memorials) has been produced.

== Cemetery Road ==
The cemetery gave its name to Cemetery Road which runs along its front boundary and in which can be found the Holly Bush, one of the oldest pubs in Lye, and the rear of the grounds of Lye Cricket Club.
