= Pedmore High School =

Location
- Grange Lane; Pedmore; Stourbridge, West Midlands, DY9 7HS; England; 52.4500°N 2.1261°W

Information
- Type: Academy
- Local authority: Dudley
- Trust: Invictus Education Trust
- Department for Education URN: 145593 Tables
- Ofsted: Reports
- Headteacher: Christopher Mills
- Gender: Mixed
- Age: 11 to 16
- Enrolment: 569 as of October 2015
- Website: http://www.pedmorehighschool.uk/

The Pedmore High School is a mixed secondary school located in the Pedmore area of Stourbridge, West Midlands, England.

The school opened in September 1939, it was to be called Pedmore Road School, but the use of road names for schools in Worcestershire was no longer policy and so opened as The Grange Secondary School, shortly after the Borough of Stourbridge being taken over by Dudley in September 1976 the school was changed to comprehensive status, and lost its sixth form, The name The Grange School remained in use until it changed to Pedmore Technology College in 2005, which was then again dropped in 2018 to The Pedmore High School

It adopted the name "Pedmore Technology College and Community School" in September 2005 upon becoming a specialist Technology College. Expansion took place in 2007 to accommodate pupils transferred from the closing Cradley High School.

It is the larger of the two schools in Pedmore, and has a variety of features including 2 sport halls, an assembly hall, 4 playgrounds, 2 football pitches, a canteen, Design & Technology block and swimming pool.

As of 2018 the school became part of the Invictus Education Trust, joining with 5 other schools in and out of the Dudley area. As of 2026 the school offers a variety of GCSE subjects.
