= Hurst Green =

Hurst Green may refer to the following places in England:

- Hurst Green, East Sussex
- Hurst Green, Essex, a location
- Hurst Green, Lancashire
- Hurst Green, Surrey
- Hurst Green, West Midlands
