= Cradley High School =

Secondary school in Halesowen, England

Coordinates: 52.4627°N 2.0922°W

- Cradley area of Halesowen; England

Information
- Type: Secondary school
- Established: 1939
- Closed: 2008
- Enrollment: 606 (2006)

Cradley High School was a secondary school located in the Cradley area of Halesowen, which is a village in the West Midlands county of England. It is situated in the west end of Halesowen near the borders with Stourbridge and Brierley Hill, namely Homer Hill. As of 2006, the school had 606 pupils on roll.

== Admissions ==
In 2006, fears were rife that falling numbers on the school's roll might force it to close. In February 2007, Dudley's independent School Organisation Committee approved proposals to close the school with effect from 31 August 2008. The Year 11 pupils left as normal in 2007. Year 10 pupils completed their education at Cradley High and left in 2008. Pupils in Years 7, 8 and 9 transfer to other schools in September 2007, with most pupils moving to Pedmore Technology College.

The final year of pupils left the school over the summer of 2008, and the school buildings (along with the adjacent leisure centre) are expected to be sold off for redevelopment. The large school fields, however, are to be retained for community use.

The Cradley High buildings were completed in the spring of 1992 at the end of a five-year construction project which saw the original buildings gradually replaced by new ones. The official opening took place on 5 June 1992, but tragedy struck when head teacher Mr John Grass died suddenly from a heart attack. His successor was Ms Toni Fowler, who remained at the school until its closure 16 years later.

The origins of Cradley High School date back to 1939, when Cradley Secondary Modern School opened to serve pupils aged 11 and above in the expanding community of Cradley. This school closed in July 1972 as part of a reorganisation of schools in the Halesowen area, and was replaced with Cradley Middle School for pupils aged 9–13. However, this system was scrapped after 10 years and the school was redesignated as an 11-16 comprehensive in September 1982, adopting the name Cradley High School. Within 10 years, the whole school had been rebuilt.

== Academic performance ==
It has achieved mixed success in the local GCSE tables, being the Dudley borough's lowest-scoring school in 2001, but having improved substantially since then.

== 2008 arson attack ==
On 28 April 2008 a technology workshop in the school was damaged by fire and smoke in an arson attack. It is believed that a firework was put into the room which set fire to furniture. The fire was attended to by two crews from Brierley Hill and Cradley Heath fire stations.

== Demolition ==
The school was demolished over the summer of 2010, having been derelict for two years.

== Website Removal ==
After six years of keeping the website open It was removed in mid-June 2014.
