= Lyndsie Holland =

English opera singer and actress (1939–2014)

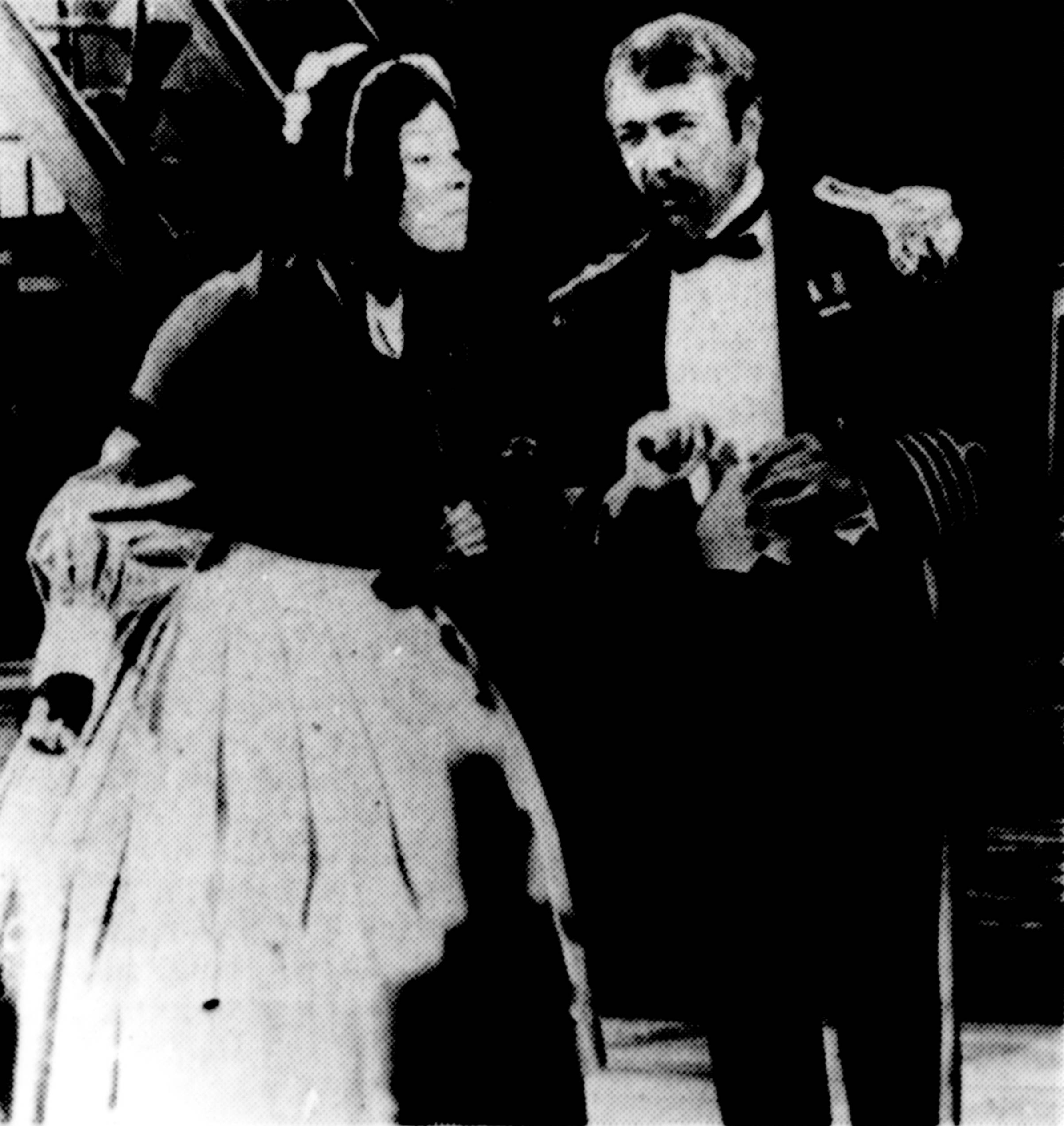
Holland as Little Buttercup in H.M.S. Pinafore opposite Michael Rayner as Captain Corcoran, 1973

Lyndsie Holland (12 March 1939 – 2 April 2014) was an English opera singer and actress known for her performances in the contralto roles of the Savoy Operas.

After beginning her singing career in the chorus of the Sadler's Wells Opera in 1968, Holland starred in the Gilbert and Sullivan contralto roles with the D'Oyly Carte Opera Company for seven years, beginning in 1970. In later years, she performed in musical theatre and concerts.

== Early life and career ==
Holland was born Margaret Foster in Pedmore, a suburb of Stourbridge, the youngest of eight children. She attended Stourbridge High School and began clerical work at British Road Services in Kingswinford, later working as a telephonist in Birmingham for a firm of stockbrokers. She began taking singing lessons and performed, at first, in some local musicals and with a Kingswinford-based male choir, the Gentlemen Songsters in Stourbridge. She then joined the Midland Music Makers Grand Opera Society, an amateur operatic society, where she performed for three years, eventually playing Konchakovna in Prince Igor. This was seen by a talent scout from Sadler's Wells Opera. She debuted with Sadler's Wells in September 1968, in the chorus, where she played in twenty-three operas. Holland adopted, for her stage name, the maiden names of her two grandmothers.

In December 1970, she joined the D'Oyly Carte Opera Company. Her first role, in March 1971, was Lady Sangazure in their newly revived production of The Sorcerer, and she was soon performing major roles in ten of the Gilbert and Sullivan operas, adding Little Buttercup in H.M.S. Pinafore, Ruth in The Pirates of Penzance, Lady Jane in Patience, the Queen of the Fairies in Iolanthe, Lady Blanche in Princess Ida, Katisha in The Mikado, Dame Hannah in Ruddigore, Dame Carruthers in The Yeomen of the Guard, and the Duchess of Plaza-Toro in The Gondoliers. She continued to play these roles for seven years, leaving the company in July 1977.

In 1975, she had the opportunity to re-create the roles of Lady Sophy in Utopia, Limited and the Baroness in The Grand Duke, which had not been performed professionally in Britain since the 1890s. She also sang the role of Little Buttercup at the Royal Command Performance at Windsor Castle.

== Later years ==
In later years, Holland performed in concerts both in Britain and elsewhere. She appeared in the UK national tour of Evita in 1986–1987 and in Ivor Novello's Perchance to Dream at the Wolsey Theatre, Ipswich. She continued to perform in Gilbert and Sullivan operas and gave concerts at, among other places, the Stourbridge Town Hall.

Holland died in 2014 at the age of 75, after a heart attack, at a nursing home in Streatham.

== Recordings ==
With the D'Oyly Carte Opera Company and Decca Records, she recorded five of her roles: Lady Sophy and the Baroness in 1976, Katisha in 1973, the Queen of the Fairies in 1974, and the Duchess of Plaza-Toro in 1977. She also appeared as Little Buttercup in the company's 1973 ATV film of H.M.S. Pinafore.
