= Hayley Green =

Hayley Green may refer to:

- Hayley Green, Berkshire, part of the parish of Warfield
- Hayley Green, West Midlands, a suburb of Halesowen, West Midlands
