= Oldswinford =

Coordinates: 52.449°N 2.142°W

Old Swinford
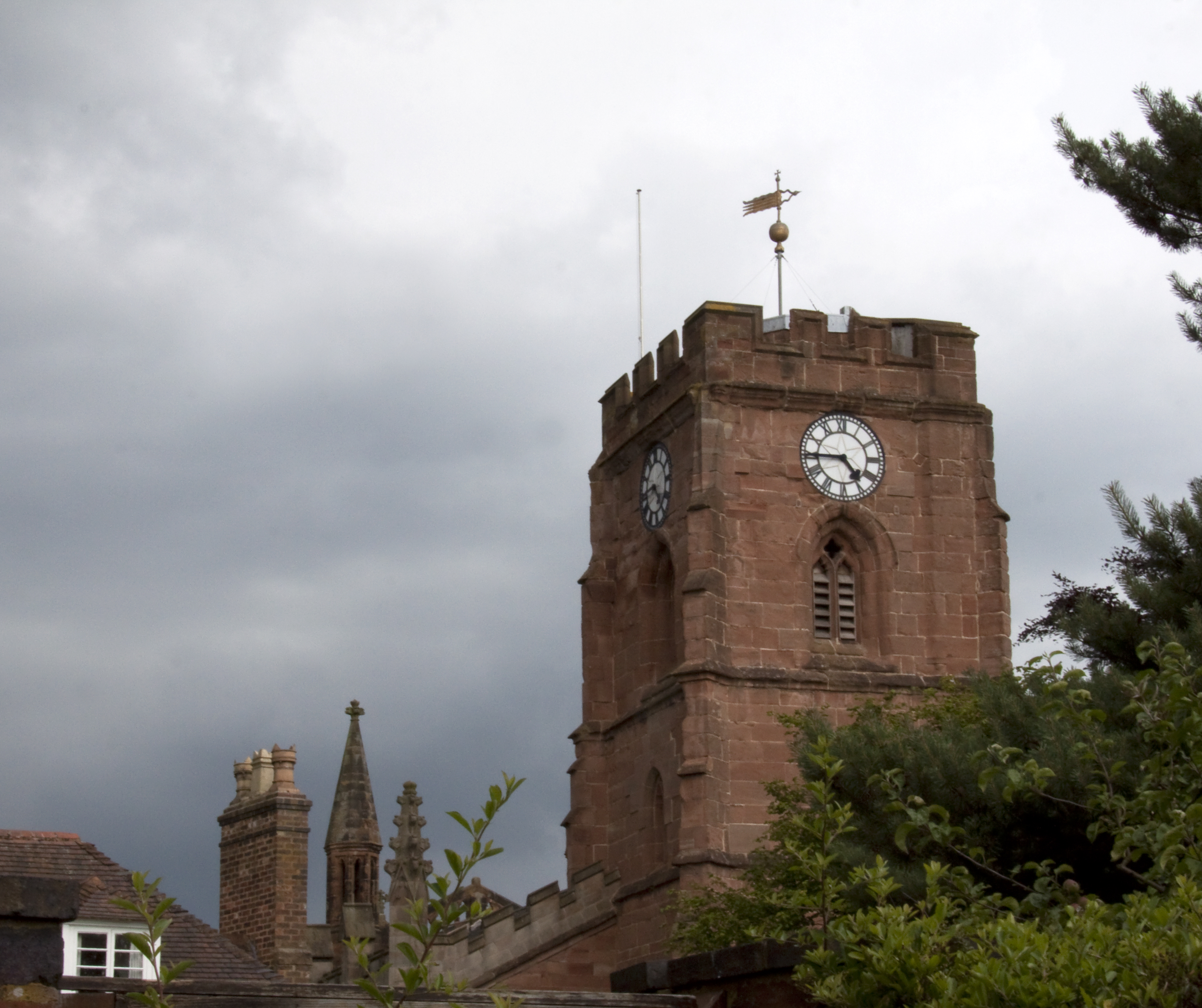
- Parish Church of St Mary

- Location within the West Midlands
- Metropolitan borough: Dudley
- Metropolitan county: West Midlands
- Region: West Midlands
- Country: England
- Sovereign state: United Kingdom
- Police: West Midlands
- Fire: West Midlands
- Ambulance: West Midlands

Oldswinford or Old Swinford is an area south of the centre of Stourbridge, in the Dudley district, in the county of the West Midlands, England.

== History ==
Originally, Oldswinford was an extensive ancient parish, covering the whole of the former Municipal Borough of Stourbridge except Pedmore. This included Wollaston, Lye, and Norton (which were part of the same manor), but Stourbridge and Amblecote, while in the parish, were separate manors. Amblecote was formerly in Staffordshire, but the rest of the parish (south of the River Stour) was in Worcestershire. Both Stourbridge and Amblecote were formerly administered separately from the rest of Oldswinford. The parish was abolished in 1866 as part of a reorganisation of the local government of Stourbridge. In 1831 the parish had a population of 13,874.

The manor of Old Swinford changed hands from time to time during the Middle Ages as a result of political upheavals and the changes of fortune of its overlords. It is questionable whether these great feudal lords ever visited this manor, the supervision of the peasants' customary service and the collection of dues and fines being left to their stewards. Edward VI gave a grant for the foundation of a school in 1553. The Lytteltons, seated a few miles away at Frankley until their house there was destroyed during the Civil War causing them to move to Hagley, acquired the superior manor of Old Swinford in 1564 and they were the dominant local family until the 17th century when, having fallen from favour and lost much of their wealth through involvement in the Gunpowder Plot and the Royalist and Roman Catholic causes in Stuart times, they were superseded by the Foleys whose wealth was based on the rapidly expanding iron industry.

The name was sometimes formerly written Old Swinford. This spelling is still used for Old Swinford Hospital, a voluntary-aided school with boarding houses, founded and endowed by the ironmaster, Thomas Foley. The parish name and that of Kingswinford derive from a swine ford, perhaps on the crossing of the Stour that also gave rise to the name Stourbridge. The road crossing there was the main road between the Saxon burhs of Worcester and Stafford. However (conceivably), it was a crossing of the minor brook that runs east of the church and under Brook Road between the houses 2 (The Briars) and 4 (The Willows), Oldswinford.

The tower of St Mary's Church is from the late 14th century but the rest of the church was rebuilt in the 19th century.

There are numerous pre-1900 buildings remaining in Oldswinford. The area has been heavily developed with upmarket private housing since the 1920s.

== See also ==
- Brierley & Hagley A.F.C., formerly Oldswinford Football Club
- Old Swinford Hospital, a selective voluntary aided boys' boarding school and mixed sixth form college in Stourbridge

== Bibliography ==
- Haden, H. Jack (1980). Stourbridge in Times Past.
