= Redhill School, Stourbridge =

Redhill School
- ‘A Block’ of Redhill School, north from Junction Road

Location
- Junction Road; Stourbridge, West Midlands, DY8 1JX; England; 52°27′10″N 2°08′19″W

Information
- Type: Academy
- Motto: Commitment To Excellence
- Established: 1976
- Department for Education URN: 139872 Tables
- Ofsted: Reports
- Chair: Steve Morris
- Headteacher: Jamie Clayton
- Gender: Coeducational
- Age: 11 to 16
- Enrolment: 1180
- Colours: Blue and Green
- Website: http://www.redhill.dudley.sch.uk/

Redhill School is a coeducational secondary school with academy status, located in Stourbridge, West Midlands (formerly Worcestershire), England.

It has no sixth form, similar to most schools in the Borough of Dudley, and all schools in Stourbridge. It is situated just east of the single-track Stourbridge Town Branch Line.

== History ==
It was formed in September 1976, when Stourbridge Boys' Grammar School and Stourbridge Girls' High School in the town centre merged with Lye Secondary Modern School in the Lye area. These former schools were administered by Worcestershire Education Committee until 1974.

The new school was located entirely at the grammar and high school sites on Redhill, near Stourbridge town centre on either side of Junction Road, with the Lye building being converted to a community centre.

The school gained specialist Language College status in 2003 before converting to an academy in July 2013. Redhill School is a member of the Stour Value Academy trust, a group of fourteen schools in and around the West Midlands.

== Results ==
In the 2023 academic results year, 46% of students achieved grade 5 of above in English and Maths GCSEs. this had grown to 53.7% in 2025. When reviewed against schools in the Dudley area, Redhill School is the seventh best performing school based on Attaintment 8 averages at GCSE.

== Staff misconduct ==
A number of teachers have been found guilty of a range of misconduct whilst teaching at Redhill School. In 2007, Paul Bodley was given a three year probation order for using a hidden camera to film female students in a school bathroom. In 2020, Edward Cox was banned from teaching after admitting dishonesty relating to submitting pupils' work to exam boards. In 2023, supply teacher Austin Murphy was banned indefinitely from teaching following misconduct toward a vulnerable student at the school.

== Building ==
The original building is known as ‘A block’ has been extensively refurbished and a number of other buildings added to the site. The Music Centre is known as ‘B block’, The Humanities, and Creative Technology learning areas are on the other side of Junction Road in ‘C block’. Next to this building is the science centre, the Sports Development Centre, sports hall and gym.

Redhill School has a proprietary sports pitch for playing football.

In September 2023 Redhill was one of the 572 schools identified as containing RAAC.
