= Lye, West Midlands =

Town in Dudley, England

Coordinates: 52.459°N 2.116°W

Lye
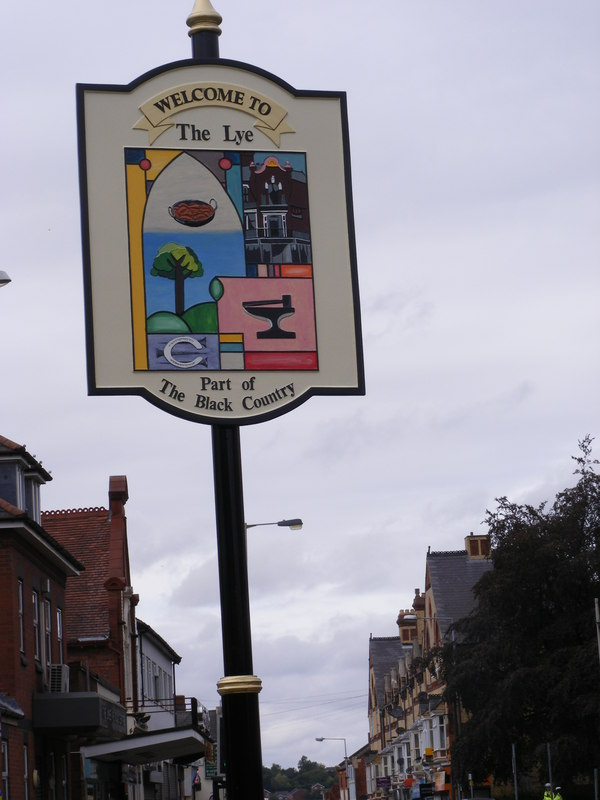
- The Lye town sign

- Location within the West Midlands
- Population: 12,346 (Lye ward) (2011 Census)
- OS grid reference: SO921846
- Metropolitan borough: Dudley
- Metropolitan county: West Midlands
- Region: West Midlands
- Country: England
- Sovereign state: United Kingdom
- Post town: Stourbridge
- Postcode district: DY9
- Dialling code: 01384
- Police: West Midlands
- Fire: West Midlands
- Ambulance: West Midlands
- UK Parliament: Stourbridge

Lye or The Lye is a town in the Metropolitan Borough of Dudley, in the West Midlands County, England. It is in Stourbridge and borders Pedmore and Wollescote.

== History ==
Lye was formerly a village historically situated within the boundaries of the county of Worcestershire. It used to be famous for the manufacture of nails, anvils, vices, chain, crucibles and firebricks. Lye Waste, adjacent to the original village of Lye, was an area of uncultivated common land but it was settled by people who, by building houses including a fireplace within 24 hours by using mud and clay as the main building materials, acquired freehold rights as a result of the passing of the Inclosure Acts [sic] from 1604 onwards, and it became thickly built upon.

Bentley's History, Guide and Classified Directory of Stourbridge of 1841, describes the district of Lye and Lye Waste as "almost one continued series of humble dwellings and work-shops interspersed at intervals with others of a more respectable appearance". Nailmaking was the main occupation but anvils, chains, vices, bricks and tobacco pipes were also made. The writer observes that the "poor artizan in many of the trades appears to get a very small remuneration for his labour, and to make an improvident use of much of even the little he gets."

Lye was formerly a township and chapelry in the parish of Old Swinford, in 1866 Lye became a separate civil parish, on 1 April 1974 the parish was abolished. In 1951 the parish had a population of 4769.

The village of Careless Green, now part of Lye but once a separate village immediately to the south-east, was noted for insurance clubs called Stewpony societies and the Stewpony Allotment Society which tried to improve conditions for the labouring classes.

== Landmarks ==
The local cemetery is the Lye and Wollescote Cemetery, which contains a pair of grade II listed chapels.

== Transport ==
Lye railway station serves the community and is situated on the Birmingham to Worcester via Kidderminster line.

The National Express West Midlands bus route number 9 to and from Birmingham and Stourbridge serves Lye

== Sport ==
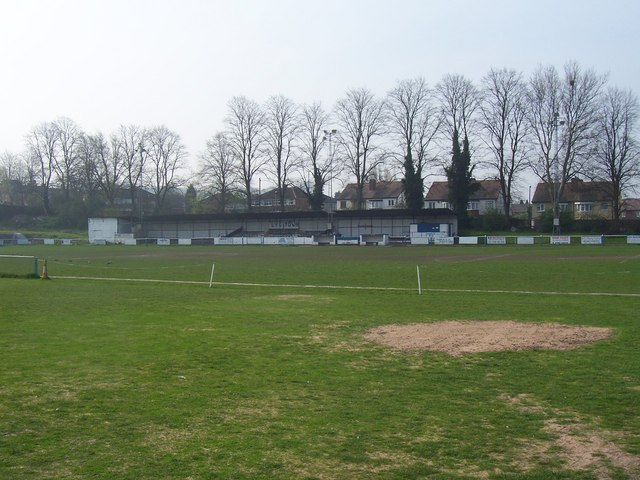
The Sports Ground, home of Lye Town FC

The town has an association football club, Lye Town FC, which has competed in the West Midlands Regional League since 1947. They currently compete in the Midland League Premier Division, the ninth tier of English football. The club were West Midlands (Regional) League Premier Division champions in 2013–14. Its home ground is The Sports Ground, which it shares with the resident cricket club.

== Sir Cedric Hardwicke ==
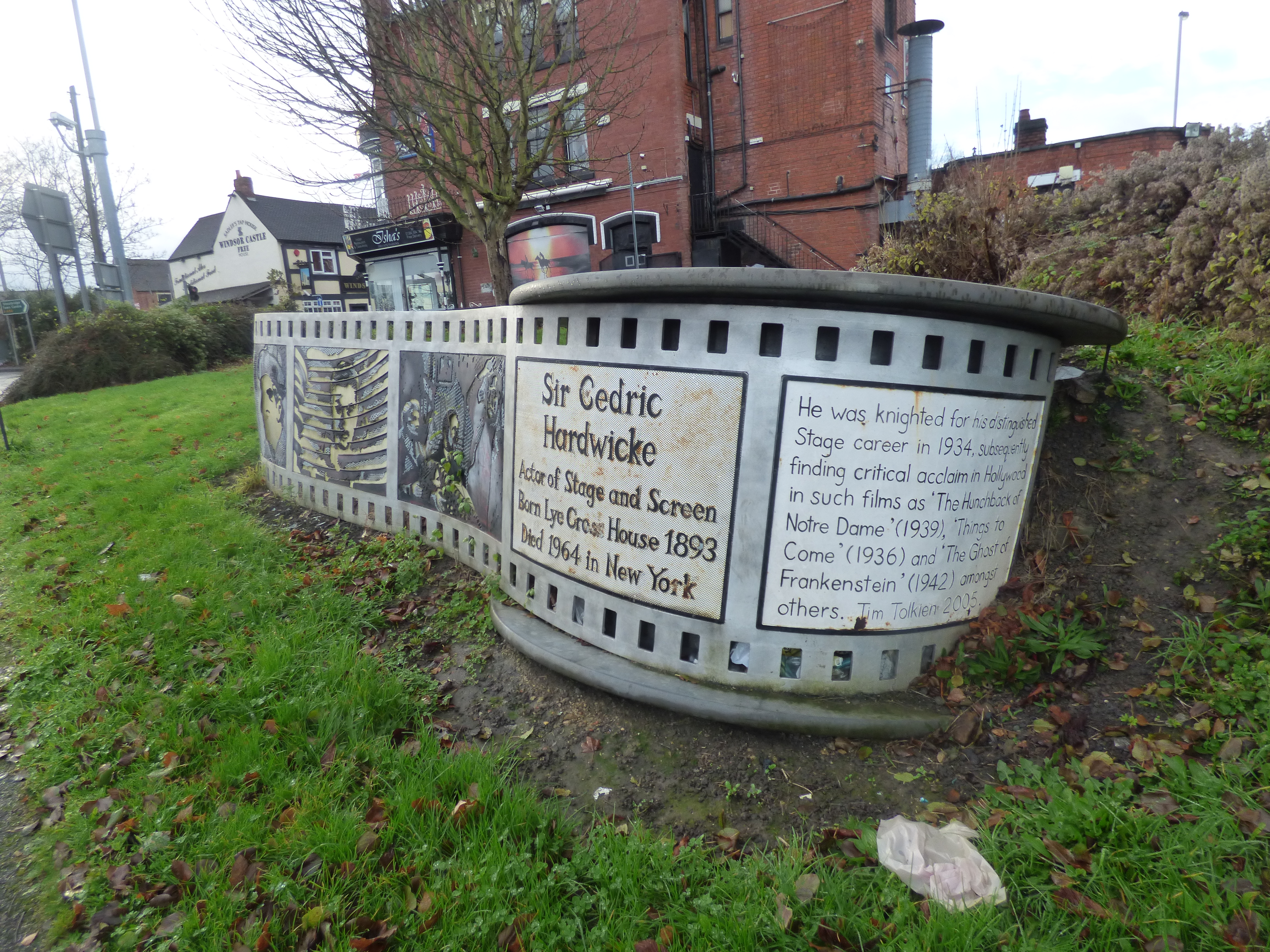
Sir Cedric Hardwicke sculpture on Dudley Road

Lye is the birthplace of the actor Cedric Hardwicke, who is commemorated by a sculpture by Tim Tolkien, commissioned by Dudley Metropolitan Borough Council. The memorial takes the form of a giant filmstrip, the illuminated cut metal panels illustrating scenes from some of his best-known films which include The Hunchback of Notre Dame, Things to Come, and The Ghost of Frankenstein. It was unveiled in November 2005 and is located at Lye Cross near his childhood home.
