= King Edward VI College, Stourbridge =

King Edward VI College
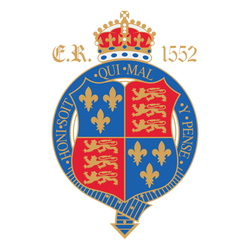

Location
- Lower High Street; Stourbridge, West Midlands (former Worcestershire), DY8 1TD; England; 52°27′31″N 2°08′49″W

Information
- Type: Academy sixth form Day
- Motto: French: Honi soit qui mal y pense (Shame on him who thinks evil of it)
- Established: 1552; 474 years ago
- Founder: King Edward VI
- Local authority: Dudley
- Trust: Heart of Mercia Academy Trust
- Department for Education URN: 148142 Tables
- Ofsted: Reports
- Principal: Holly Bembridge
- Gender: Coeducational
- Age: 16 to 19
- Enrolment: c. 2,250
- Colour
- Former name: King Edward VI Grammar School
- Website: kedst.ac.uk

King Edward VI College (KEDST) is a selective state sixth form centre located in Stourbridge, England, in the West Midlands area.

It is situated in the centre of Stourbridge, to the north of the town centre, on the side of the ring road (A491). In 2024, the college was listed as 'good' following an inspection by Ofsted.

The college's motto is the same motto as that of the Order of the Garter. Translated from Old French it meant "Shame be to him who thinks evil of it".

== History ==
The original school was founded on 21 May 1430 and was known as the Chantry School of Holy Trinity. The charter for the grammar school was granted on 17 June 1552 by King Edward VI. It became a selective sixth form college in September 1976 due to the introduction of comprehensive education in the Dudley borough, which Stourbridge had been incorporated into 2 years earlier and most of the rest of the borough had followed suit with a year earlier.

In February 2021 the college converted to academy status and is now sponsored by the Heart of Mercia Academy Trust.

== Admissions ==
The college is selective, and students are accepted only on the condition of achieving high grades at GCSE level.

Students are generally from within the West Midlands, coming from as far afield as Birmingham, Wolverhampton and Worcester. Background education of most pupils is usually from state secondary schools, though there are many independent institutions in the area. For example, some pupils come from Elmfield Rudolf Steiner School and Old Swinford Hospital.

== Campus ==
The college buildings are all on one site, on Lower High Street in Stourbridge. The campus is bound by the Ring Road, Coventry Street, adjacent shops on Lower High Street and the street itself, and a new housing development. All lessons take place on college grounds.

In 2018 the college opened the new Frank Foley Building, situated near Duke Street, at a cost of £3.5 million. This provides a new canteen, dance studio, drama suite, computer science and graphic design facilities for students. Additionally, the Henry Hickman Building was converted from a sports hall to a library, at a cost of £1.8 million. It was completed in 2019, providing the college with a brand-new Library and new classrooms for Politics, History and Classical Civilisation.

== A-Level & AS subjects ==
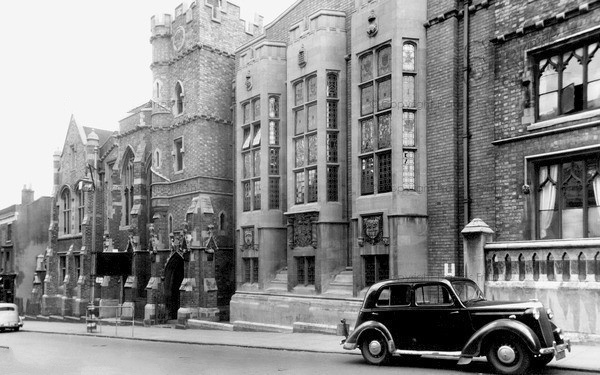
College building c.1950

Students choose 3 or 4 subjects to study in the first year, year 12. At the end of year 12, students who studied 3 subjects carry all of these through to the second year, year 13, whilst most students studying 4 subjects in year 12 drop a subject. Students following a 3 subject programme have more time for enrichment activities and time to focus on the chosen courses in depth, whilst those students studying 4 subjects have flexibility when deciding which subject to drop. These are the courses taught at Kings Edward's, as of September 2021.

- Accounting
- Applied Science (BTEC)
- Biology
- Business
- Chemistry
- Classical civilisation
- Computer science
- Criminology (Level 3 Applied Diploma)
- Dance
- Drama and theatre studies
- Economics
- English language & literature
- English literature
- Film studies
- Fine Art
- French
- Geography
- Geology
- Graphic design
- History early modern
- History modern
- History of art
- Law
- Mathematics
- Mathematics with further maths
- Media studies
- Music
- Philosophy
- Physical education
- Physics
- Politics
- Psychology
- Religious studies
- Sociology
- Spanish
- Statistics
- Textiles

== Old Edwardians ==
- Kenton Allen, producer of The Royle Family and the film "Six Shooter".
- James Hand, BBC presenter and namer of Boaty McBoatface.
- Rob Hawthorne sports commentator for Sky Sports
- Richard Jones
- Clint Mansell, English musician, composer, and former lead singer and guitarist of the band Pop Will Eat Itself.
- Dan O'Hagan sports commentator for BBC's Match of the Day
- Stephanie Peacock, MP for Barnsley East
- Nicola Richards, MP for West Bromwich East
- Councillor Simon Phipps, Dudley MBC
- Esther Smith, actress
- Philip Tibbetts, HM March Pursuivant Extraordinary - The Court of the Lord Lyon (2021-)
- Lydia Thompson plays Rugby Union for England
- James Wade, professional darts player and featured on Jim'll fix it

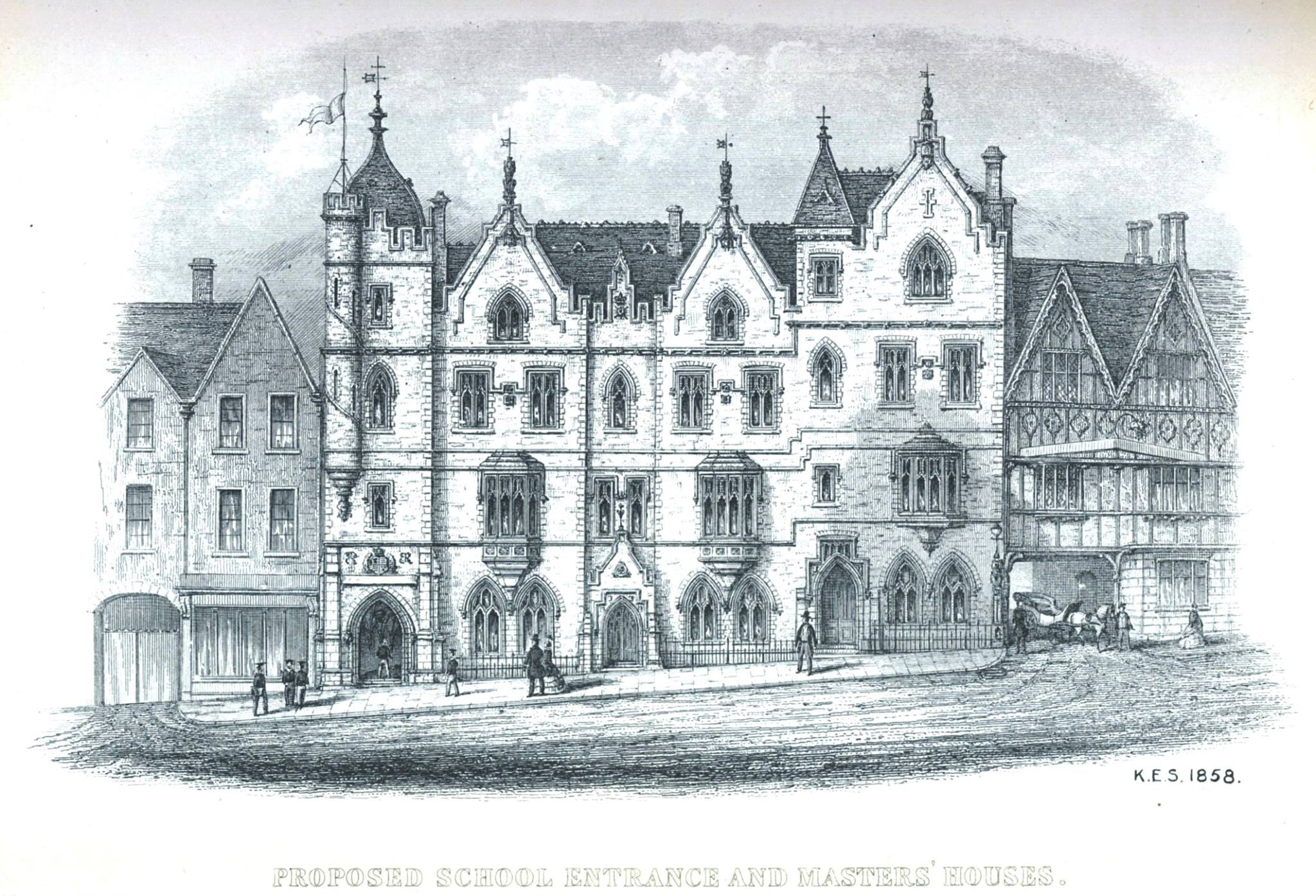
c.1858

=== King Edward VI Grammar School for Boys, Stourbridge ===
- Anthony Bate, actor
- Mike Cooper-Slipper, Battle of Britain pilot and later test pilot in Canada for Orenda Engines
- Sir Michael Davies, judge
- Terry Davis, Secretary General of the Council of Europe and Labour MP for Bromsgrove from 1971 to 1974, Birmingham Stechford from 1979 to 1983 and Birmingham Hodge Hill from 1983 to 2004
- Ian Fleming, organic chemist
- David Garrick, actor, playwright, theatre manager and producer
- Samuel Johnson, writer
- Alan Kennedy, professor of psychology from 1972-2006 at the University of Dundee
- Sir Ian Kennedy, chairman of the Healthcare Commission from 2004 to 2009
- Robin Morgan, editor of the Sunday Times from 1995 to 2009
- Sir Harry Pitt, vice-chancellor of the University of Reading from 1964 to 1979
- Robert Plant, lead singer of Led Zeppelin
- Richard Stanton-Jones, aeronautical engineer, rocket scientist, managing director of the British Hovercraft Corporation 1968-82.
- David Trotman, mathematician
- Sir Maurice Wilkes, computer scientist
