= Norton, Stourbridge =

Coordinates: 52.452152°N 2.160637°W

Norton
- Location within the West Midlands
- Population: 11,841 (2011.Ward)
  - Density: 21/hectare
- OS grid reference: SO 89683 83623
- Metropolitan borough: Dudley
- Metropolitan county: West Midlands
- Region: West Midlands
- Country: England
- Sovereign state: United Kingdom
- Post town: Stourbridge
- Postcode district: DY8
- Dialling code: 01384
- Police: West Midlands
- Fire: West Midlands
- Ambulance: West Midlands
- UK Parliament: Stourbridge

Norton is a suburb and council ward in the town of Stourbridge, West Midlands. It has a population of 11,943 in an area of 569 hectares. The population is largely White British and self-identifies as predominantly Christian.

== History ==
The area now known as Norton originally fell within the parish of Oldswinford before becoming part of the Municipal Borough of Stourbridge. This was then subsumed into Dudley Metropolitan Borough in 1974. It now borders Stourbridge Town, Wollaston, Iverley, South Staffordshire and Oldswinford.

== Governance ==
Norton ward extends from Love Lane (only the parks side of Love Lane is in Norton; the opposite side is Oldswinford) in Oldswinford along Heath Road and South Road, then left across Roman Road all the way to Norton Road. The boundary follows the built-up area around Racecourse Farm (Racecourse Farm is in Pedmore and in the parish of St Peters along with Racecourse Lane and Fairways Avenue). The golf course is built on Pedmore Common, not Norton; Quarry Park Rd and surrounding roads are built on Pedmore Quarry, not Norton) along with Norton Road and Worcester Road along the borders of West Hagley (it borders Pedmore, not West Hagley).

It comes under the parliamentary constituency of Stourbridge, whose Member of Parliament is Cat Eccles (Labour).

== Amenities ==
The area features Mary Stevens Park, one of five staffed parks in the borough, which features a large lake, sports facilities, outdoor gym and children's recreation areas. The park is a designated "healthy hub" within Dudley.

The area also includes Norton Covert, a former sand and gravel pit which produced building sand and aggregate during the 19th century. It is now a designated Site of Importance for Nature Conservation (SINC) for geology and is owned and managed by Dudley Council.

=== Places of worship ===
- St Michael & All Angels, Maynard Avenue
- Gig Mill Methodist Church, Glebe Lane

=== Schools ===
- Gig Mill Primary School
- St Joseph's Roman Catholic Primary School
- Elmfield Rudolf Steiner School

=== Other ===
- Stourbridge Golf Club (though some say it's in Pedmore, as its on Pedmore common)
