= Mary Stevens Park =

Park in Stourbridge, England

Coordinates: 52.44939°N 2.15460°W

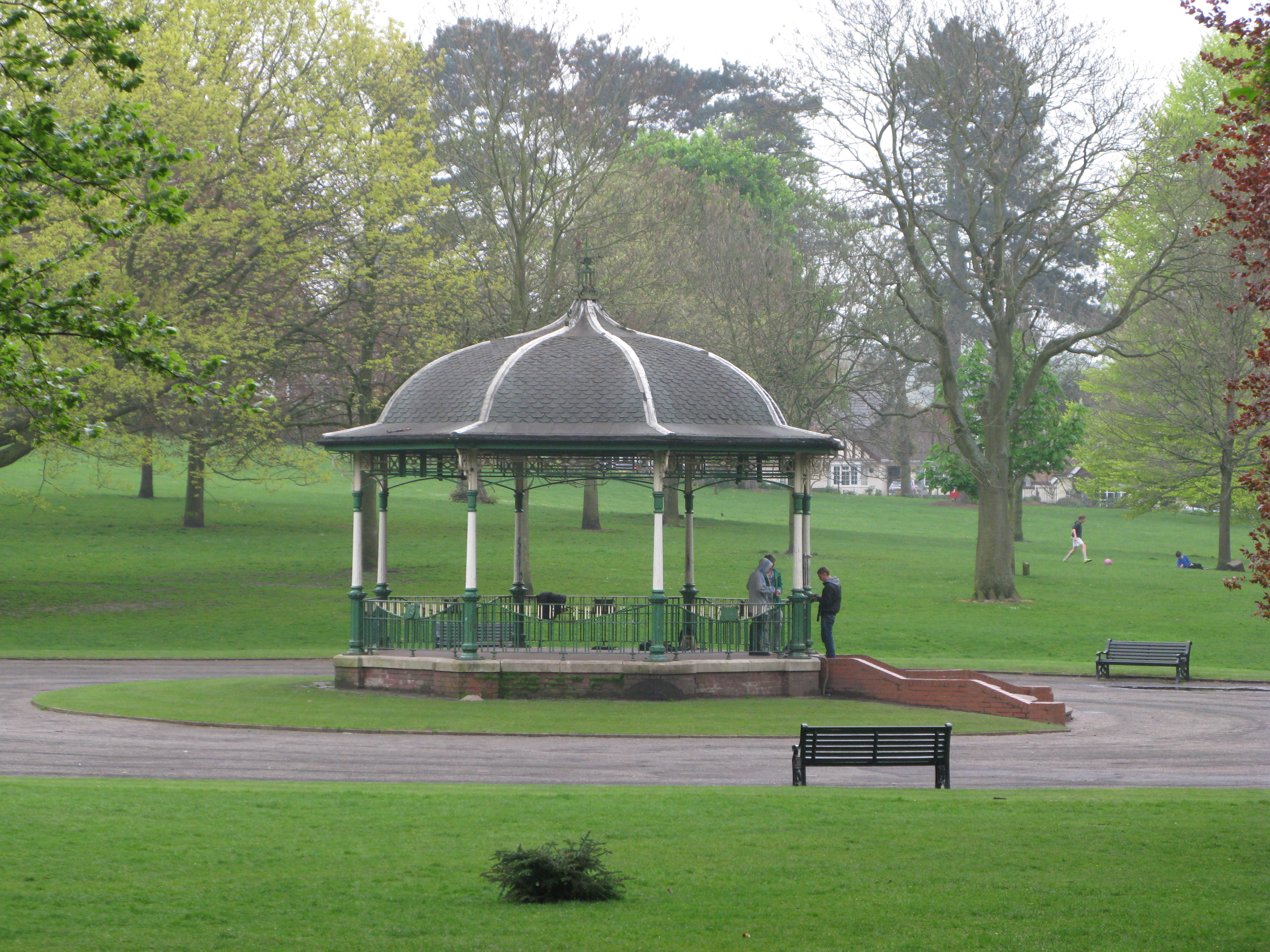
- The bandstand at Mary Stevens park
- Interactive map of Mary Stevens Park
- Location: Norton, Stourbridge, West Midlands
- Nearest city: Wolverhampton
- Created: 1931; 95 years ago
- Operator: Dudley Council
- Visitors: 1.3 million per annum

Mary Stevens Park is a public park located in Norton, Stourbridge, West Midlands, England. Opened to the public in 1931, it attracts 1.3 million visitors per year and is approximately 13.65 hectares (33.7 acres).

It was given to the town of Stourbridge by local industrialist and philanthropist Ernest Stevens, in honour of his wife Mary.

Landscape features include a pond called Heath Pool which was a former mill pond and a mixture of open spaces and woodland.

The park has a number of architectural features including the War Memorial and the Main Entrance gates which are both Grade II listed. It also has the park keeper's cottage, council house, a bandstand and a café in the tea gardens.

Sports and exercise facilities include tennis courts, multi-use games area, Crown green bowls and croquet, an outdoor gym, Healthy Hub Activity Centre as well as a children's playground and water play feature.
