= Hurst Green, West Midlands =

Suburb of Halesowen, England

Coordinates: 52.471°N 2.023°W

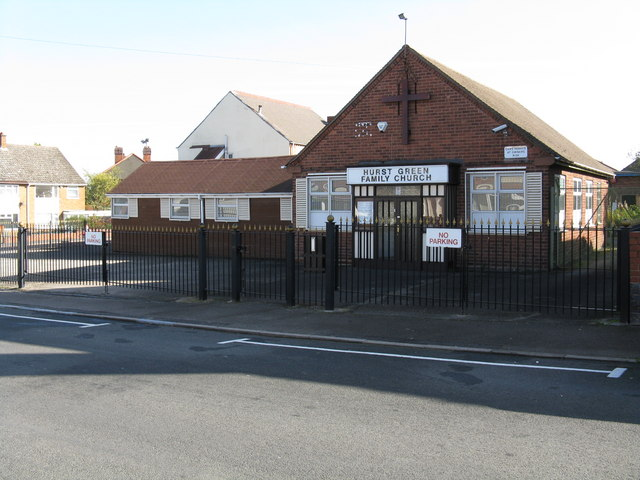
Hurst Green Family Church

Hurst Green is a suburb of Halesowen in the Metropolitan Borough of Dudley, located on its north-eastern side. Its principal thoroughfares are Narrow Lane/Fairfield Road, Summerfield Avenue and Hurst Green Road and Woodbury Road with a small shopping centre at the eastern end of the latter bordering the M5 motorway. It is a mixture of owner-occupied and municipal housing, the latter concentrated around Brandon Road/Westfield Road. There is an industrial area to its north along Fairfield Road and Cakemore Road.

It is served by buses X8, X10, 13A, 14, 19, 202, 231

Although it is administratively part of Halesowen, it is geographically closer to Blackheath, where its residents have traditionally shopped and to where most of its public transport links operate.
