= Pedmore =

Coordinates: 52°26′34″N 02°07′55″W

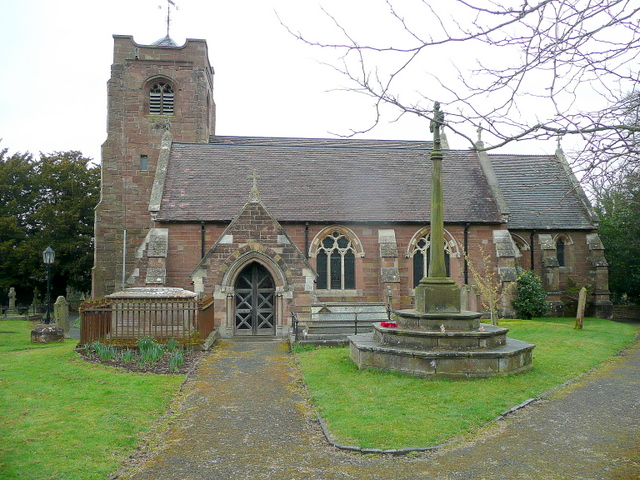
- St Peter's church

- Location within the West Midlands
- Metropolitan borough: Dudley
- Metropolitan county: West Midlands
- Region: West Midlands
- Country: England
- Sovereign state: United Kingdom
- Post town: STOURBRIDGE
- Postcode district: DY9
- Dialling code: 01384
- Police: West Midlands
- Fire: West Midlands
- Ambulance: West Midlands

Pedmore is a residential suburb of Stourbridge, in the Dudley district of the West Midlands, England, bordering Lye, Wollescote and Oldswinford. It was originally a village in the Worcestershire countryside until extensive housebuilding during the interwar years saw it gradually merged into Stourbridge. The population of the appropriate Dudley Ward (Pedmore and Stourbridge East) taken at the 2011 census was 12,471.

== History ==
In 1951 the civil parish had a population of 1366. On 1 April 1974 the parish was abolished.

== Amenities ==
Pedmore is home to the Pedmore Cricket Club and is served by the nearby railway stations of Stourbridge Junction railway station and Hagley railway station.

Pedmore is served by two primary schools - Pedmore Church of England School, and Ham Dingle Primary Academy. It is also served by a secondary school - Pedmore High School, which until July 2004 was called The Grange School.

In the 1920s, Pedmore House was built on what is now the end of Ham Lane. It became a local landmark, offering restaurant facilities that later incorporated the Tuscana Italian restaurant as well as 20-bedroom hotel. It closed in July 2006, despite being hugely popular with customers, and was demolished the following year to make way for a housing development by David Payne homes.

Manchester United and England footballer Ashley Young has lived in Pedmore since 2007. Aston Villa footballer Nigel Reo-Coker is also believed to live in the area. Playwright Stephen Laughton grew up here.
