= Metropolitan Borough of Dudley =

Metropolitan borough in West Midlands, England

Borough of Dudley
- Metropolitan borough
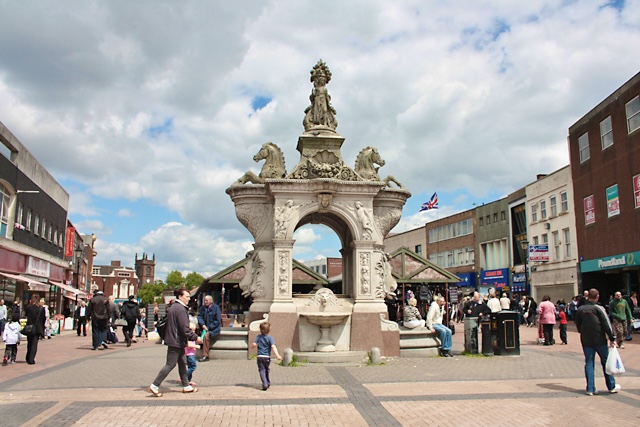
- Dudley, the administrative centre of the borough
- Motto: Unity and Progress
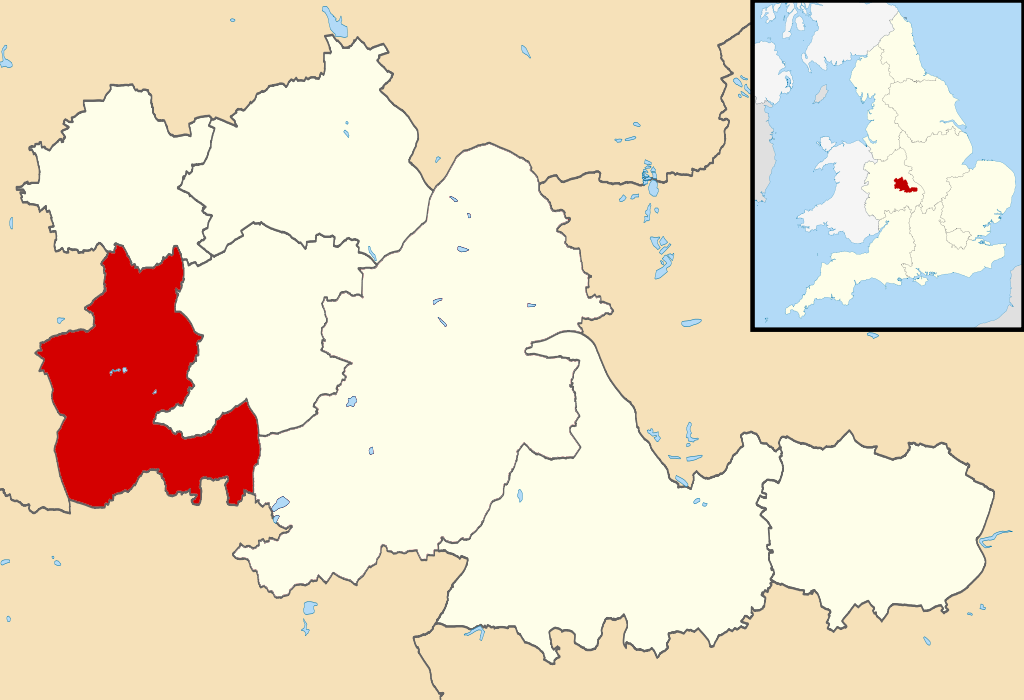
- Dudley Metropolitan Borough shown within West Midlands
- Sovereign state: United Kingdom
- Constituent country: England
- Region: West Midlands
- Metropolitan county: West Midlands
- Historic county: Worcestershire and Staffordshire
- Status: Metropolitan borough
- Admin HQ: Dudley
- Incorporated: 1 April 1974

Government
  - Type: Metropolitan borough council
  - Body: Dudley Metropolitan Borough Council
  - Leadership: Leader and cabinet (Conservative)
  - Mayor: Hilary Bills
  - MPs: Sonia Kumar ((Labour)); Cat Eccles (Labour); Alex Ballinger (Labour); Mike Wood (Conservative); Antonia Bance (Labour)

Area
  - Total: 37.82 sq mi (97.96 km^{2})
  - Rank: 200th (of 296)

Population (2024)
  - Total: 331,930
  - Rank: Ranked 35th
  - Density: 8,776/sq mi (3,388/km^{2})

Ethnicity (2021)
  - Ethnic groups: List: 84.9% White; 8.4% Asian; 2.8% Mixed; 2.5% Black; 1.4% other

Religion (2021)
  - Religion: List: 49.3% Christianity; 36% no religion; 6.2% Islam; 5.5% not stated; 1.6% Sikhism; 0.7% Hinduism; 0.5% other; 0.2% Buddhism; 0.1% Judaism
- Time zone: UTC0 (GMT)
  - Summer (DST): UTC+1 (BST)
- Postcode areas: DY (1 - 6, 8, 9); B (62, 63); WV (14)
- Dialling codes: 01384 (Dudley); 0121 (Birmingham); 01902 (Wolverhampton); 01562 (Kidderminster)
- ISO 3166 code: GB-DUD
- ONS code: 00CR (ONS); E08000027 (GSS)
- OS grid reference: SO9350590490
- NUTS 3: UKG36
- Website: www.dudley.gov.uk

The Metropolitan Borough of Dudley is a metropolitan borough of West Midlands, England. It was created in 1974 following the Local Government Act 1972, through a merger of the existing Dudley County Borough with the municipal boroughs of Stourbridge and Halesowen.

The borough's main settlement is Dudley but it also includes the outlying towns of Brierley Hill, Halesowen, Kingswinford, Lye, Netherton, Sedgley, and Stourbridge.

The borough borders Sandwell to the east, the city of Birmingham to the south east, Bromsgrove to the south in Worcestershire, South Staffordshire District to the west, and the city of Wolverhampton to the north.

== History ==
The Metropolitan Borough of Dudley was created in 1974 from the existing boroughs of Dudley, the Municipal Borough of Stourbridge and the Municipal Borough of Halesowen. This followed an earlier reorganisation in 1966, as per the provisions of the Local Government Act 1958, which saw an expansion of the three boroughs from the abolition of the surrounding urban districts of Amblecote, Brierley Hill, Coseley, and Sedgley; and the municipal boroughs of Tipton, Oldbury, and Rowley Regis.

Initially the borough had a two-tier system of local government, with the borough council sharing power with the West Midlands County Council. In 1986 metropolitan county councils were abolished under the Local Government Act 1985, and Dudley effectively became a unitary authority.

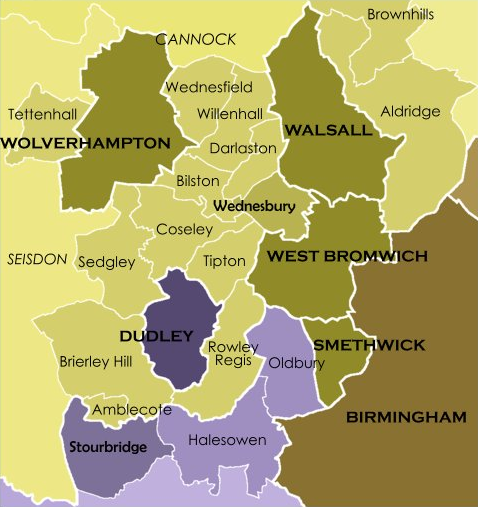
The local government structure within North Worcestershire and South Staffordshire – Prior to the West Midlands Order 1965 reorganisation

== Government ==
Dudley Council has its main offices in Dudley town centre (where Dudley Council House is located), along with additional smaller offices throughout the borough. The council is made up of 72 councillors representing 24 wards.

On its formation in 1974, the Metropolitan Borough of Dudley was controlled by the Labour Party. Since then the controlling party has frequently changed, sometimes with no political party having a clear majority.

Following the local elections in May 2024 the council returned to no overall control.

=== Mayor ===
The Mayor of the Borough acts as the Borough's first citizen attending many civic and ceremonial functions to represent the Council. They are elected at the Annual Meeting of the Council and serves for the whole of the Municipal Year until the next Annual Meeting.

As part of the West Midlands Combined Authority, Dudley is also served by the Mayor of the West Midlands.

=== Wards ===
The 24 wards of the Dudley Borough are each represented by 3 councillors.

Ward name	Population (2021 census)	Change since 2011 census	Population density (residents per square km)
Amblecote	12,927	Decrease (-466)	4,320.8
Belle Vale	14,291	Increase (+807)	4,369.8
Brierley Hill	15,016	Increase (+1,081)	3,463.6
Brockmoor and Pensnett	14,726	Increase (+1,803)	2,798.5
Castle and Priory	17,029	Increase (+3,290)	3,776.4
Coseley East	13,409	Increase (+1,052)	4,165.6
Cradley and Wollescote	13,730	Increase (+290)	3,287.0
Gornal	13,354	Increase (+362)	2,854.4
Halesowen North	13,359	Increase (+1,186)	3,287.1
Halesowen South	12,245	Increase (+86)	1,747.9
Hayley Green and Cradley South	11,980	Increase (+118)	2,638.0
Kingswinford North and Wall Heath	11,853	Decrease (-708)	2,816.7
Kingswinford South	12,647	Increase (+17)	3,787.0
Lye and Stourbridge North	12,467	Increase (+118)	3,629.0
Netherton, Woodside and St. Andrews	14,909	Decrease (-108)	2,819.8
Norton	11,856	Increase (+15)	2,082.3
Pedmore and Stourbridge East	12,284	Decrease (-187)	2,656.9
Quarry Bank and Dudley Wood	13,667	Increase (+226)	3,830.9
St. James's	14,242	Increase (+29)	4,115.9
St. Thomas's	16,285	Increase (+1,891)	4,832.5
Sedgley	11,750	Decrease (-337)	3,118.2
Upper Gornal and Woodsetton	13,592	Decrease (-201)	4,134.4
Wollaston and Stourbridge Town	13,429	Increase (+337)	4,603.1
Wordsley	12,440	Decrease (-412)	4,225.1
Source: ONS 2021 Census data

=== Demography ===
Ethnic population in Dudley
2021 UK Census	Dudley Borough	West Midlands (region)	England
Total population	323,488	5,950,757	56,490,048
White	84.9%	77.0%	81.0%
Mixed groups	2.8%	3.0%	3.0%
Asian/Asian British	8.4%	13.3%	9.6%
Black/Black British	2.5%	4.5%	4.2%
Arab & other groups	1.4%	2.1%	2.2%
Source: ONS 2021 Census

At the 2021 Census, the total population of Dudley Metropolitan Borough was 323,488, an increase of 10,563 from the 2011 Census. The population density was 3,320.4 residents per square km compared to the West Midlands region population density was 457.8 residents per square km.

84.9% of Dudley's population identified as White, with 82.4% identifying as White British, 0.3% as White Irish, and 2.1% as Other White. The second largest ethnic group was Asian and British Asian, making up 8.4% of the population (an increase from 2011 where the figure was 6.1%). Black and Black British people comprised 2.5% of the population of the borough (an increase from 2011 where the figure was 1.5%).

Statistics on religious beliefs show that 49.3% of the population identify as Christian (65.3% in 2011), with the second largest religious group being Muslim, at 6.2% (4.1% in 2011). 36% identified as having no religion.

Unemployment amongst those aged 16 and over in the borough stood at 3.8%, slightly higher than the national average of 3.5%. 41.1% of those aged 16 and over were economically inactive, consisting of 24.3% retired, 5.2% looking after homes or family, 4.5% long-term sick or disabled, 4.2% students and 3.0% other economically inactive.

Religion in Dudley
2021 UK Census	Dudley Borough	West Midlands (region)	England
Total population	323,488	5,950,757	56,490,048
Christian	49.3%	46.6%	46.3%
Buddhist	0.2%	0.3%	0.5%
Hindu	0.7%	1.5%	1.8%
Jewish	0.0%	0.1%	0.5%
Muslim	6.2%	9.6%	6.7%
Sikh	1.6%	2.9%	0.9%
Other	0.5%	0.5%	0.6%
No Religion	36.0%	32.9%	36.7%
Not Stated	5.5%	5.7%	6.0%
Source: ONS 2021 Census

== Economy ==
A part of the Black Country, Dudley traditionally has been an industrial centre of manufacturing, quarrying, and mining, although this has declined in more recent years, with a shift in focus towards the service sector (accounting for 79.1% of employment) and tourism. Despite this, there are still numerous large industrial sites around the borough, such as the Pensnett Trading Estate, with the manufacturing industries making up 15.3% of employment.

Tourism is of increasing importance to the local economy, with approximately 6,600 people employed within the sector. Attractions such as the Black Country Living Museum and Dudley Zoo bring in hundreds of thousands of visitors each year.

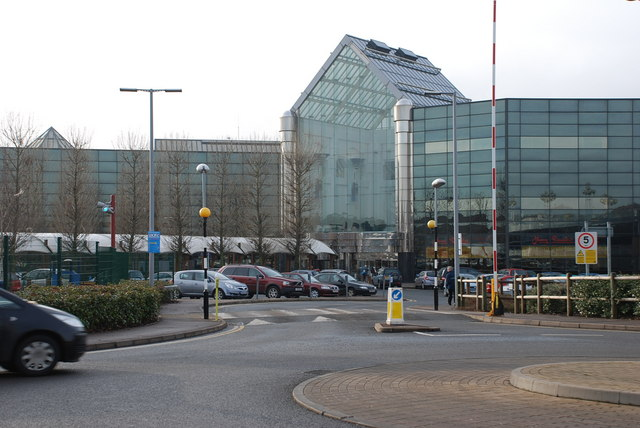
The Merry Hill Shopping Centre is one of the largest shopping centres in the UK

The Merry Hill Shopping Centre in Brierley Hill is one of the largest shopping centres in the UK and is the main retail centre of the borough, with an average of 23.5 million visitors a year, and houses branches of several large retailers including Primark, Marks & Spencer, and Next.

Other large employers in the borough include JCDecaux UK, which has its Birmingham area office in Halesowen, Rentokil Initial, and Midtherm Engineering.

== Tourism and visitor economy ==
Dudley borough has an increasing tourism offer, with attractions such as the Black Country Geopark being recognised in 2020 and the Stourbridge Glass Museum that opened in 2022. Tourism and the visitor economy is an important sector to the borough, supporting approximately 8,000 jobs.

Many of the borough's tourist attractions draw on the industrial heritage of the area. For example, the Red House Glass Cone is an original structure from the 18th Century glass making industry in Stourbridge. The site includes designer-maker studios, galleries and hot glass studio. The Stourbridge Glass Quarter locality is also home to The Lace Guild, Glasshouse Heritage Centre and hosts the International Festival of Glass every 2 years, most recently in 2019 with the 2021 festival postponed to 2022 due to the covid-19 pandemic.

The Caste Hill area of Dudley is also a hub of visitor attractions including the Black Country Living Museum and the Canal and Tunnel Trust. Dudley Zoological Gardens, which is also in this area, is the second most visited paid visitor attraction in the West Midlands. The Archives and Local History Centre is now also the home of the council run Dudley Museum. The museum is also the headquarters of the Black Country Geopark.

Along with sites recognised as part of the Geopark, the borough has seven nature reserves and many parks contributing to its green spaces. In 2021, the Green Flag award was obtained by seven of the boroughs sites (Buffery Park, Huntingtree Park, Mary Stevens Park, Priory Park, The Leasowes, Wrens Nest National Nature Reserve and Saltwells National Nature Reserve). Mary Stevens Park and Priory Park were also awarded Green Heritage Site status, with Abbey Road Allotments recognised with a Green Flag Community Award.

Despite not being in the bounds of Dudley borough, Himley Hall and Park is owned and run by Dudley Metropolitan Borough Council. In addition to the 180 acres of ‘Capability’ Brown landscaped parkland, the Hall has a gallery exhibition space and is a wedding venue.

== Regeneration ==
Large public and private sector developments have taken place in the Metropolitan Borough of Dudley since its creation in 1974.

The closure of Round Oak Steelworks in December 1982 paved the way for the creation of the Merry Hill Shopping Centre on nearby farmland between 1985 and 1989. The Waterfront leisure and commercial complex was developed on the site of the steelworks itself between 1989 and 1995.

Pensnett Trading Estate in Kingswinford has been developed since the 1960s for mostly light industry and services.

A major redevelopment of Halesowen town centre took place in 2007/08, when the bus station was rebuilt and a section of the 1960s shopping area demolished to make way for a new Asda superstore.

A similar redevelopment of Stourbridge town centre in 2011/12 saw most of the Crown Centre completely rebuilt to incorporate a new Tesco superstore.

There are currently several major regeneration projects throughout the borough. Significant infrastructure projects include the new Dudley Transport Interchange and the Wednesbury to Brierley Hill West Midlands Metro extension. The 11 km metro extension will connect Dudley, Merry Hill and Brierley Hill with the metro network and so to the proposed HS2 line. The first phase to Dudley town centre is expected to open for passenger services in 2024. The second phase will then extend to Brierley Hill, terminating in Cottage Street in the town centre following an additional £60million funding from central government.

Regeneration projects around the Castle Hill area are combining innovation and education. The Black Country and Marches Institute of Technology opened in September 2021 and focuses delivery on higher level courses in manufacturing and engineering, medical engineering, modern construction methodologies and digital technologies. The Very Light Rail (VLR) National Innovation Centre will provide a research facility for the development of VLR technologies and projects. The centre will redevelop the former Dudley Railway Station and reconnect the town with the National Rail Network.

The DY5 Business and Innovation Enterprise Zone was launched in 2017 with the ambition to create 7,000 new jobs over 25 years. The zone is centred around the Brierley Hill area.

The Dudley Townscape Heritage programme is on ongoing programme of work improving historical buildings in Dudley town centre. Phase 1 ran from 2008-2015, phase 2 from 2017-2023. Phase 2 started following a National Lottery Heritage Fund grant of £1.2 million. As part of the programme historic buildings were identified, repaired or restored. Heritage trails and open days were also developed. In addition, further development of the former Dudley Museum and Art Gallery site has been proposed as part of a £4million scheme. The former Sessions Court in the same complex of buildings been converted into Brookes Bistro restaurant. Named for Brooke Robinson who was a former MP and coroner for Dudley and left a bequest which led to the building for the former Museum and Art Gallery, Town Hall and Coroners Court.

== Housing ==
Relatively little new council housing has been built in the borough since the early 1980s, with almost all of the new social housing developments since then being built by housing associations. Most of the older private housing in the borough has been renovated rather than demolished during this time. However, there have been a number of redevelopment programmes involving 20th century council housing. In July 1999, four of the borough's tower blocks (two at Eve Hill in Dudley and two at Tanhouse in Halesowen) were demolished on consecutive weekends in controlled explosions. Two years later, two more tower blocks at Queens Cross in Dudley were demolished using the same method. Four tower blocks in Netherton are scheduled for demolition in 2017/18. In 2009, 266 homes on the predominantly 1930s Priory Estate in Dudley were demolished and the land later redeveloped with new housing. In the mid-1990s, the neighbouring Wren's Nest Estate underwent extensive refurbishment as well as improved community facilities in a multimillion-pound project funded by the European Single Budget. Four blocks of low-rise flats on the estate were demolished as part of the regeneration.

Since 2017 small developments of council housing have been built, including bungalows, housing and low-rise flats. Some properties have been designed to accommodate those with specific physical needs or those in need of supported living. The homes have been built across the borough (Brierley Hill, Coseley, Dudley, Halesowen, Kingswinford, Lower Gornal, Sedgley and Stourbridge). During this period Dudley Council have also built a number of homes for private sale.

In November 2021 Dudley Council was named homebuilder of the year (organisations with 16,000 homes or more category) at the Inside Housing UK Housing Awards.

== Education ==
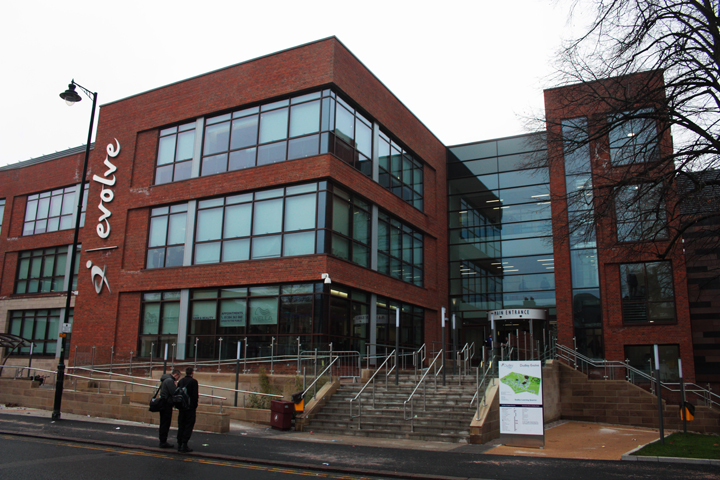
Evolve Campus of Dudley College

=== Tertiary education ===
There are two further education colleges in the Dudley Borough: Dudley College of Technology, Halesowen College. The borough is also home to the King Edward VI sixth form college in Stourbridge, originally a grammar school established in 1552, converting to a sixth form centre in 1976. A small number of secondary schools in the borough offer sixth form facilities, while several others did so until the beginning of the 1990s when the local authority decided to concentrate post-16 education in further education colleges.

In March 2011 Eton College and Star Academies announced their intention to open one of three sixth form colleges in Dudley, subject to funding through the Department for Education’s Free Schools Programme.

Since the University of Wolverhampton closed its Dudley campus in 2002, the metropolitan borough is the largest district in the UK without its own university. Several projects in the Castle Hill area of the Dudley are now linking with local universities. The Black Country & Marches Institute of Technology opened in September 2021, with a focus on higher level engineering courses, it partners Dudley College of Technology, University of Wolverhampton, University of Worcester, In-Comm Training Services Limited and Avensys UK Limited. A Higher Education Centre for Health & Care is proposed as a partnership between Dudley College of Technology and University of Worcester and expected to be open for Autumn 2024.

=== Primary and secondary education ===
There are 104 Dudley Council schools: 78 Primary, 40 of which include a Nursery Unit (24 Primary Academy); 19 Secondary (of which 15 are Secondary Academy Schools) and 7 Special Schools. Pupils transfer to secondary school at the age of 11, although between 1972 and 1990 pupils in the north of borough transferred to secondary school at the age of 12, and from 1972 to 1982 there was a three-tier education system in Halesowen where pupils entered first school at 5, middle school at 9 and secondary school at 13.

The borough had well over 30 secondary schools on its creation, although this was quickly reduced as a result of the introduction of the comprehensive system a year later, which resulted in a number of schools being merged or closed.

By September 1990, however, the number of secondary schools in the borough had fallen to 22 as a result of the closure of Gilbert Claughton and Mons Hill Schools and the merger of High Park and Longlands Schools in Stourbridge to form Ridgewood High. A year earlier, Castle High had been formed in the town centre of Dudley from a merger of The Dudley School and Blue Coat School; this new school also took in some of the former Gilbert Claughton and Mons Hill pupils. The 1980s had also seen the closure of some the borough's less popular and smaller primary schools, with the older buildings mostly being demolished and the more modern ones being converted for community use.

The closure of Cradley High School in Halesowen in July 2008 saw the number of secondary schools in the borough fall to 21, dropping to 20 with the closure of Pensnett High School in July 2012, and to 19 when the Coseley School closed five years later.

When the Metropolitan Borough of Dudley was formed, many primary schools existed as separate infant and junior - or first and middle schools, but by 1990 virtually all of the separate schools had been merged to create full age-range primary schools, the last separate infant and junior schools to merge were Red Hall in Lower Gornal in January 1997.

There are no grammar schools in the borough since the mid-1970s, all secondary state schools have been comprehensive. The former grammar schools in the borough were Dudley's Boys Grammar and Girls High Schools (merged with Park Secondary Modern School in 1975 to form The Dudley School, which in turn merged with The Blue Coat School to form Castle High in 1989), Sir Gilbert Claughton Grammar School in Dudley (which adopted comprehensive status in 1975 before closing in 1990), Brierley Hill Grammar School (actually situated in Kingswinford; it has been known as the Crestwood School since adopting comprehensive status), King Edward VI Boys Grammar School in Stourbridge (which is now a mixed sixth form college), Stourbridge Girls High School (which merged with the Boys Grammar School and Valley Road Secondary Modern School to form Redhill School), Halesowen Grammar School (which merged with Halesowen Technical School to form Earls High School) and High Arcal Grammar School in Sedgley (which survived as a comprehensive school).

The sole independent school in the borough is the Elmfield Rudolf Steiner School in Stourbridge, which follows the Steiner Waldorf curriculum.

The Old Swinford Hospital school in Stourbridge is one of only 34 state-funded boarding schools in England, with education being funded by the local education authority (LEA).

== Healthcare ==
The main NHS hospital serving the borough is Russells Hall Hospital, situated to the south of Dudley town centre. Following a major expansion of the hospital in 2005, all inpatient services were transferred to the site from smaller hospitals around the borough, resulting in the closure of Wordsley Hospital, and the downgrading of the Guest Hospital and Corbett hospitals into outpatient centres.

Psychiatric care is offered at the Bushey Fields Hospital, located adjacent to Russells Hall Hospital.

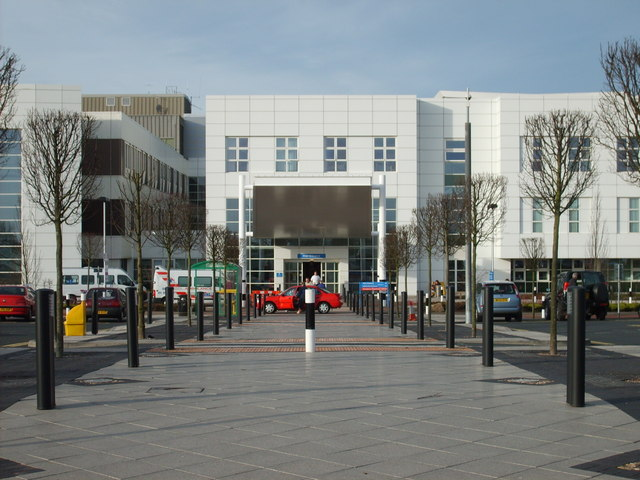
Russells Hall Hospital

See also Healthcare in West Midlands.

== Localities ==
See List of areas in Dudley

== Freedom of the Borough ==
The following have received the Freedom of the Borough of Dudley. The Roll of Freeman is displayed in the Council House on wood panelling at the entrance to the Council Chamber.

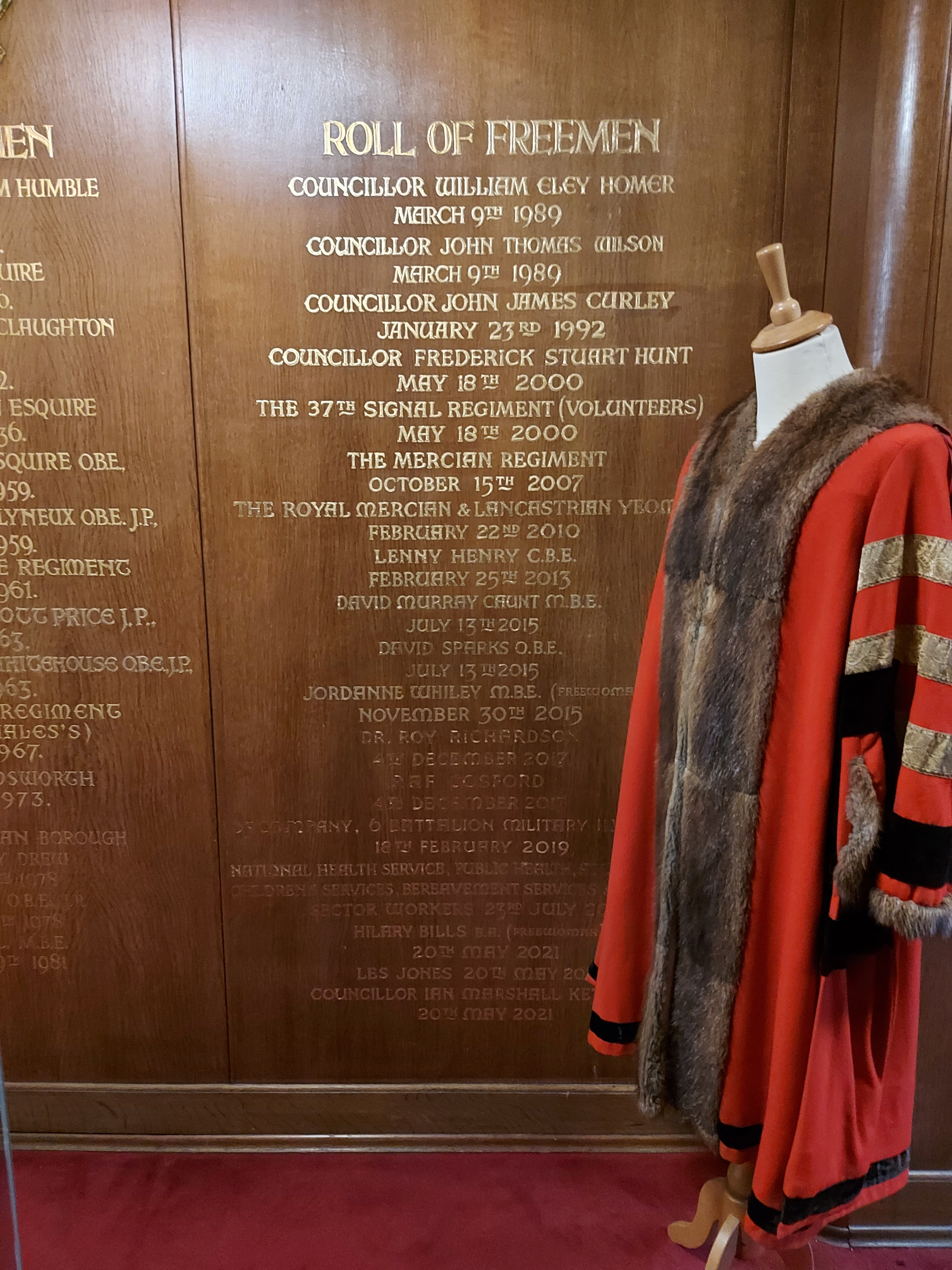
Example of the panelling which lists the Roll of Freeman in Dudley Council House

=== Individuals ===
- William Humble, Earl of Dudley: 10 January 1899
- Brooke Robinson: 11 September 1906
- Sir Gilbert Henry Claughton, Baronet: 9 November 1912
- Edwin John Thompson: 24 November 1936
- John Harry Molyneux: 24 February 1959
- John Collcott Price : 23 April 1963
- Harry Clifford Whitehouse: 23 April 1963
- Percy Dale Wadsworth: 25 April 1973
- Bert Bissell: 19 February 1981
- William Eley Homer: 9 March 1989
- John Thomas Wilson: 9 March 1989
- John James Curley: 23 January 1992
- Frederick Stuart Hunt: 18 May 2000
- Sir Lenny Henry: 25 February 2013.
- David Murray Caunt: 13 July 2015
- David Sparks: 13 July 2015
- Jordanne Whiley: 30 November 2015.
- Roy Richardson: 4 December 2017
- Hilary Bills: 20 May 2021
- Les Jones: 20 May 2021
- Ian Marshall Kettle: 20 May 2021

=== Military units ===
- The Worcestershire Regiment: 8 April 1961
- The Staffordshire Regiment (The Prince of Wales's): 29 April 1967
- The Mercian Regiment: 15 October 2007
- The Royal Mercian and Lancastrian Yeomanry: 22 February 2010
- Royal Mercian and Lancastrian Yeomanry (TA): 30 June 2012
- RAF Cosford: 4 December 2017
- 63 Company, 6 Battalion Military Intelligence Company Intelligence Corps: 18 February 2019.

=== Organisations and groups ===
- National Health Service, Public Health, Adult Services, Children's Services, Bereavement Services and Care Sector Workers: 23 July 2020

== See also ==
- Evolution of Worcestershire county boundaries
- South Staffordshire Line
