= Hayley Green, West Midlands =

Suburb of Halesowen, West Midlands, England

Coordinates: 52.441°N 2.080°W

Hayley Green is a suburb of Halesowen in the Metropolitan Borough of Dudley, West Midlands, England, located to the south-west of Halesowen town centre. Its focal points are the Fox Hunt public house run by the Harvester restaurant chain and a row of small shops on the A456/B4183 roundabout. It has mainly owner-occupied housing stock, built from the 1930s to 1970s including the Causey Farm estate, St. Kenelms Avenue and Squirrels estate, with a small 1940s municipal housing estate off Uffmoor Lane.

The population for the appropriate Dudley ward (Hayley Green and Cradley South), taken at the 2011 census was 11,862.

The busy A456 Manor Way/Hagley Road is its main road, to the south of which is mostly green belt countryside mainly agricultural land next to the Clent Hills and the 300 acres (1.2 km^{2}) Uffmoor Wood, an ancient woodland with public access. Manor Way, built in the 1960s, is the southern by-pass of Halesowen.

Hayley Green is located on the West Midlands/Worcestershire border, with Hagley at the western end of the A456 between Birmingham and Kidderminster. Hagley Golf and Country Club borders the suburb. The area is largely within the ancient township of Lutley, which was a distantly detached part of the manor of the Deanery of Wolverhampton.

The area is served by Lutley Primary School. It is served by bus routes 192 and 4H.

Rock singer Robert Plant lived in the area as a teenager in the early 1960s.
