= Stourbridge =

Town in the West Midlands, England

Coordinates: 52°27′27″N 2°08′52″W

- Market town
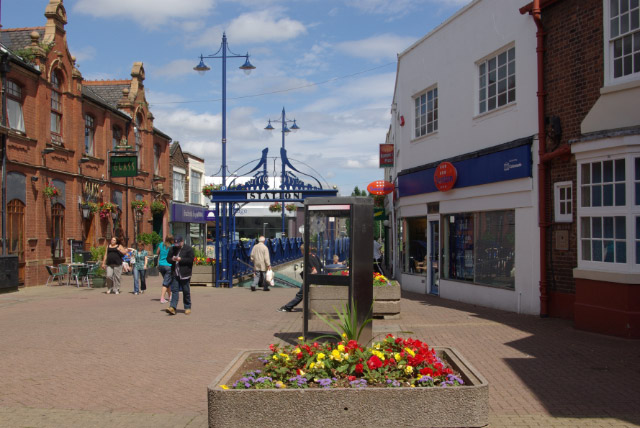
- Foster Street, Stourbridge; leading towards the railway station

- Location within the West Midlands
- Population: 56,950
- OS grid reference: SO899844
  - London: 125.8 miles/202 km
- Metropolitan borough: Dudley
- Metropolitan county: West Midlands
- Region: West Midlands
- Country: England
- Sovereign state: United Kingdom
- Post town: STOURBRIDGE
- Postcode district: DY7–DY9
- Dialling code: 01384; 01562
- Police: West Midlands
- Fire: West Midlands
- Ambulance: West Midlands
- UK Parliament: Stourbridge

Stourbridge (/ˈstaʊərbrɪdʒ/) is a market town in the Metropolitan Borough of Dudley in the West Midlands, England. Situated on the River Stour, the town lies around 11 miles (18 kilometres) west of Birmingham, at the southwestern edge of the West Midlands Conurbation. Historically in Worcestershire, it was the centre of British glass making during the Industrial Revolution. The 2021 UK census recorded the town's population as 56,950.

== Geography ==
Stourbridge is about 10 miles (16 kilometres) west of Birmingham. It is part of the Metropolitan Borough of Dudley at the southwestern edge of the Black Country and the West Midlands conurbation, Stourbridge includes the villages and suburbs of Amblecote, Lye, Norton, Oldswinford, Pedmore, Stambermill, Stourton, Wollaston, Wollescote and Wordsley.

Much of Stourbridge consists of residential streets interspersed with green spaces. Mary Stevens Park, opened in 1931, has a lake, a bandstand, a cafe, and open spaces. There are two other large parks also gifted to Stourbridge people by the Stevens family, one in Lye/Wollescote and the other in Quarry Bank.

Bordered by green belt land, Stourbridge is close to countryside with the Clent Hills to the south and southwest Staffordshire and Kinver Edge to the west.

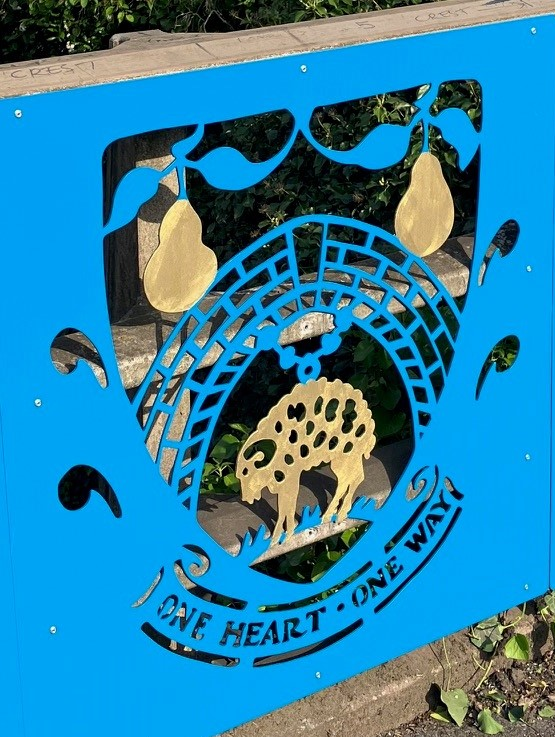
Arms of Stourbridge in a public artwork, The Stour Bridge, by Steve Field

== Climate ==
Stourbridge has an Oceanic climate (Köppen: Cfb), featuring pleasant summers with occasional rain, and cool, damp winters.

The wettest month is October, with an average of 80.51 mm of precipitation, while the driest month is March, with 47.52 mm of precipitation.

Typically, extremes of precipitation or temperature are rare. Snow is possible during winter, though quite uncommon.

On 13 August 2026, Stourbridge was severely affected by wildfires that broke out accidentally in a field where agricultural machinery was in use. The fire spread rapidly into residential areas of the town, with the 19 local homes and the Stourbridge golf course being completely destroyed. A total of 54 patients were treated by on-scene paramedics, while 19 people were taken to hospital. Other wildfires broke out in the West Midlands region on the same day, and the West Midlands Fire Service said they caused "extensive devastation", and on the following day, the UK government issued an emergency mobile phone alert to all people in England and Wales, warning of "a high risk of wildfires nationally".

In July 2026, one month before the wildfires, Stourbridge was one of the areas highlighted by the UK Met Office to have received <1mm of rain throughout the whole month.

Climate data for Stourbridge, UK (1991-2020)
| Month | Jan | Feb | Mar | Apr | May | Jun | Jul | Aug | Sep | Oct | Nov | Dec | Year |
|---|---|---|---|---|---|---|---|---|---|---|---|---|---|
| Mean daily maximum °C (°F) | 7.15 (44.87) | 7.96 (46.33) | 10.54 (50.97) | 13.8 (56.8) | 17.12 (62.82) | 19.79 (67.62) | 21.99 (71.58) | 21.41 (70.54) | 18.49 (65.28) | 14.23 (57.61) | 10.01 (50.02) | 7.46 (45.43) | 14.16 (57.49) |
| Mean daily minimum °C (°F) | 1.58 (34.84) | 1.33 (34.39) | 2.75 (36.95) | 4.24 (39.63) | 6.96 (44.53) | 9.99 (49.98) | 11.89 (53.40) | 11.81 (53.26) | 9.74 (49.53) | 7.04 (44.67) | 3.99 (39.18) | 1.84 (35.31) | 6.10 (42.97) |
| Average rainfall mm (inches) | 66.4 (2.61) | 50.91 (2.00) | 47.52 (1.87) | 58.39 (2.30) | 56.58 (2.23) | 63.34 (2.49) | 56.29 (2.22) | 61.86 (2.44) | 62.57 (2.46) | 80.51 (3.17) | 78.4 (3.09) | 78.37 (3.09) | 761.14 (29.97) |
Source: metoffice.gov.uk

== History ==
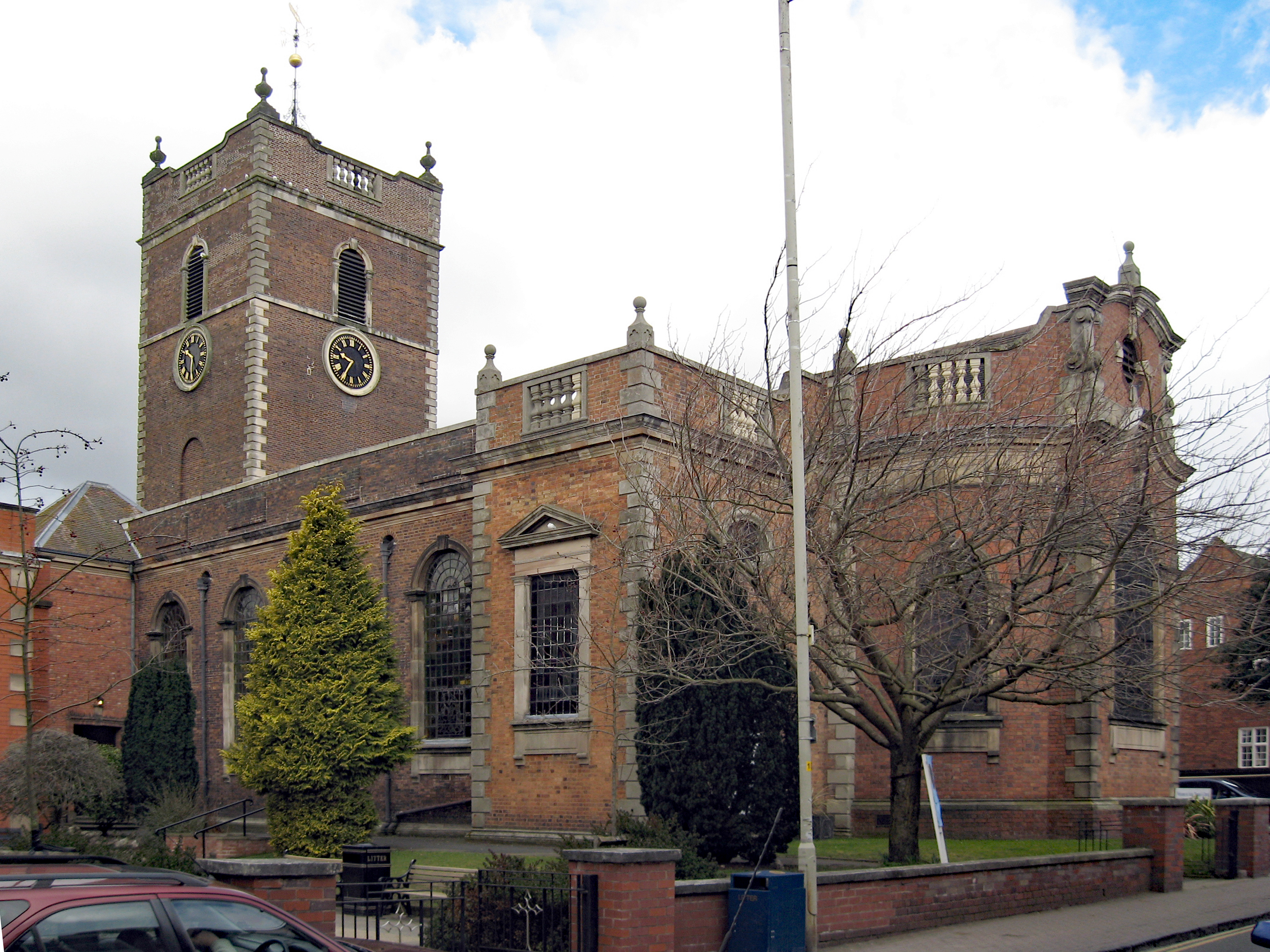
St. Thomas' Church

Stourbridge was listed in the 1255 Worcestershire assize roll as Sturbrug or Sturesbridge. The medieval township was named for a bridge which crossed the River Stour. The settlement was originally known as Bedcote and was likely Anglo-Saxon in origin. It lay within the manor of Swynford or Suineford (now Oldswinford), which appears in William the Conqueror's Domesday Book of 1086.

Pigot and Co.'s National Commercial Directory for 1828-9 describes Stourbridge as a "populous, wealthy, and flourishing market town" and gives its population in 1821 as 5,090.

In 1966, the Stourbridge border between Worcestershire and Staffordshire, which for centuries had been marked by the River Stour, was moved a couple of miles north when Amblecote was incorporated into the Borough of Stourbridge. Following the Local Government Act 1972, Stourbridge was amalgamated into the Metropolitan Borough of Dudley and became part of the wider West Midlands county in 1974.

=== Glass Making in Stourbridge ===
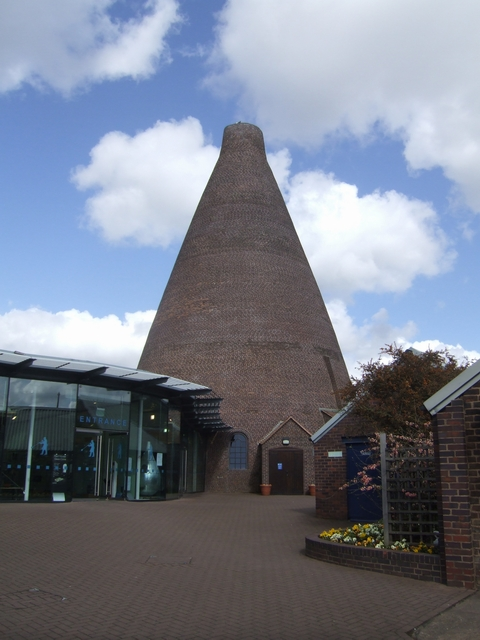
Red House Cone and Visitor Centre

The town gives its name to local glass production, which has been manufactured since the early 1600s. The local clay proved particularly suitable for the industry, taken up predominantly after the immigration of French coal miners in the Huguenot diaspora. However, most of the glass industry was actually located in surrounding areas including Wordsley, Amblecote and Oldswinford. The rich natural resources of coal and fireclay for lining furnaces made it the perfect location for the industry. Glass making peaked in the 19th century, encouraged by the famous glass-making family, the Jeavons.

The 1861 census identified that 1,032 residents of Stourbridge were involved in the glass trade in some way. Of these, 541 were glass workers - an increase from 409 in 1851, believed to be partly caused by the collapse of the glass industry in nearby Dudley in the 1850s. The vast majority of those involved in the glass trade came from Staffordshire, Warwickshire, Worcestershire and Shropshire. 9% came from other parts of England and 0.2% had come from abroad. Of particular note are glass cutters, as 8.1% had come from Ireland, believed to be as a result of the decline of the Irish glasscutting industry in the first half of the 1800s. The houses inhabited by glassworkers were of a much better quality in comparison to the slums in which the nailmakers of Lye and Wollescote lived. However, only a few glassworkers owned their own houses.

The Red House Cone, thought to be the only complete remaining glass cone of its kind, stands on the Stourbridge Canal at Wordsley. It is the site of the Red House Glass Museum and there are regular demonstrations of traditional glass blowing.

=== Modern history ===
The town centre has seen major regeneration in recent years. In 2014, Lion Health medical centre opened in the renovated former foundry of Foster, Rastrick and Company – where the Stourbridge Lion locomotive was manufactured. The next phase of regeneration on the foundry site will create parkland next to Stourbridge Canal with a "heritage and community hub" named Riverside House.

Crown Centre Shopping Mall at the bottom of Stourbridge High Street opened in 2013 at the site of the old Crown Centre and Bell Street multi-storey car park, which were demolished between 2012 and 2013. Costing £50m, the new mall is home to a 60,000 sq ft (5,600 m^{2}) Tesco anchor store, a two-level underground car park, six retail stores and a central food court. Stourbridge Bus Station underwent substantial redevelopment and re-opened as Stourbridge Interchange in April 2012.

In 2010, Stourbridge was awarded Fairtrade Town status. Stourbridge Farmers' and Craft Market takes place on the first and third Saturday of every month in the Clock Square. Throughout the summer, Mary Stevens Park hosts outdoor live music.

In August 2026, Stourbridge was heavily affected by wildfires with the Stourbridge golf course and local homes being destroyed. West Midlands Fire Service said the fires caused "extensive devastation".

== Demographics ==
In the 2011 Census, the average age of people in Stourbridge was 42.

== Governance ==
Margot James, Conservative held the Stourbridge parliamentary constituency 2010–2019. She was succeeded in 2019 by Suzanne Webb of the same party. After the 2024 General Election, Cat Eccles, Labour, became MP.

== Transport ==
Three main roads meet in Stourbridge, these being the A451, the A458 and the A491, the last forming the one way Stourbridge Ring Road.

Stourbridge has two railway stations, the main one being Stourbridge Junction. From here, it is around 30 minutes to Birmingham, 30 minutes to Worcester and between two and 2.5 hours to London. The other station, Stourbridge Town, is served only by a shuttle to and from Stourbridge Junction. At just over 1/2 mi (800 m), the Stourbridge Town Branch Line is believed to be the shortest railway branch line in Europe. The former main line to Wolverhampton via Dudley, and branches to Wombourne and Walsall closed in the 1960s. However the line towards Dudley remains open for freight as far as the Round Oak Steel Terminal north of Brierley Hill. In January 2021, proposals were made to reopen the line to Brierley Hill to passengers using a light rail vehicle similar to that used on the Stourbridge Branch Line.

Stourbridge Interchange is the main bus station, located in the town centre next to Stourbridge Town railway station. The Interchange opened in 2012 at a cost of £7 million. Most services are operated by West Midlands Bus and Diamond Bus which offer links to local areas such as Wollaston and Pedmore, and further destinations like Birmingham, Wolverhampton and Kidderminster. Diamond Bus operate the tendered service 242 to Kinver which was previously operated by The Green Bus Company but more recently Select Bus Services and added additional journeys.

By bike, National Route 54 of the National Cycle Network links Stourbridge with Dudley via the canal towpaths.

The Stourbridge Canal links the town to the Staffordshire and Worcestershire Canal and the Dudley No. 1 Canal. This places Stourbridge on the Stourport Ring, navigable by narrowboat and popular with holidaymakers.

== Education ==
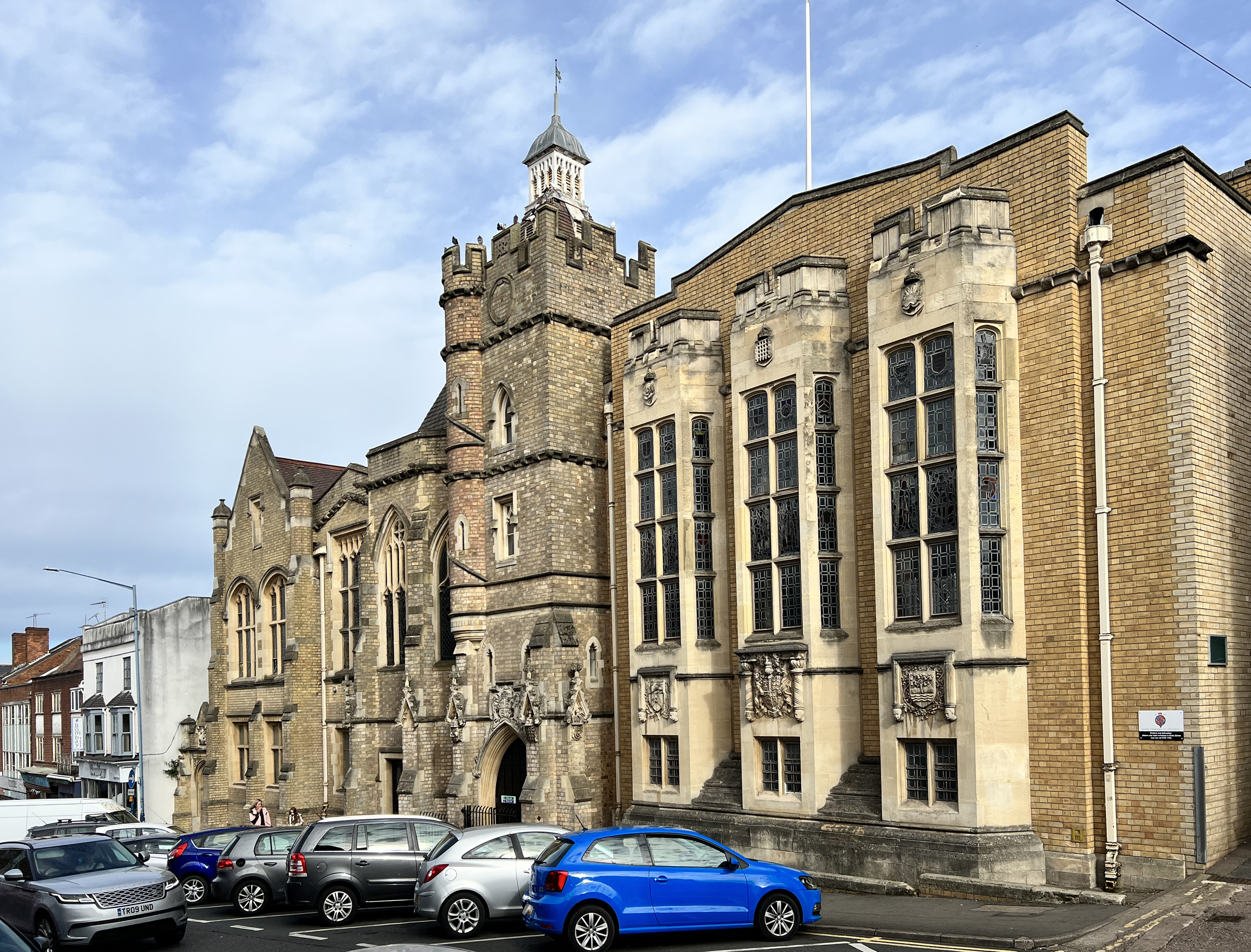
King Edward VI College, Stourbridge on Lower High Street

There is one college in Stourbridge. King Edward VI College was founded in 1552, becoming a sixth form college in 1976. Stourbridge College, south of the town centre, was formed in 1958 and specialised in art and design, but was closed in 2019.

There is also a sixth form at Old Swinford Hospital school, which was founded in 1667 by the Stourbridge-born politician Thomas Foley. In 2018, the boarding school was named the best secondary school in Dudley, closely followed by Redhill School, an academy also in Stourbridge.

Elmfield Rudolf Steiner School is an independent school which follows the international Steiner Waldorf Education curriculum.

== Culture ==
=== Festival of Glass ===
The International Festival of Glass is held at Ruskin Mill in Stourbridge every two years. The British Glass Biennale is the festival's flagship exhibition, featuring contemporary work by glass makers in the UK.

=== Music ===
In the late-1980s and early 1990s, three Stourbridge indie bands – The Wonder Stuff, Pop Will Eat Itself and Ned's Atomic Dustbin – all had chart success, selling millions of albums between them and gracing the covers of NME and Melody Maker. Pop Will Eat Itself's former frontman Clint Mansell has since composed musical scores for films including Black Swan and Requiem for a Dream.

The 80s metal bands Diamond Head, Witchfinder General and 80s pop band Kayran Dache also came from Stourbridge and Led Zeppelin's Robert Plant once attended King Edward VI College (then King Edward VI Grammar School for Boys).

=== Media ===
Stourbridge is covered by these newspapers: the Stourbridge News (weekly), and the Stourbridge Chronicle (weekly).

From the 1860s until the early 1980s, Stourbridge was covered by the County Express newspaper. The archives are now on microfilm in Stourbridge Library.

Historical records about Stourbridge are held in multiple archives across the Black Country and Worcestershire, due to Stourbridge historically being a part of Worcestershire.

=== Sport ===
Stourbridge Football Club, founded in 1876 and nicknamed "The Glassboys", shares the War Memorial Athletic Ground in Amblecote with Stourbridge Cricket Club. Stourbridge Rugby Club play at Stourton Park in nearby Stourton. Dudley and Stourbridge Harriers have trained at the Dell Stadium since 1964. Other teams include Redhill Volleyball Club, which plays at Redhill School. Stourbridge Running Club also train at the War Memorial in Amblecote.

=== Places of interest ===
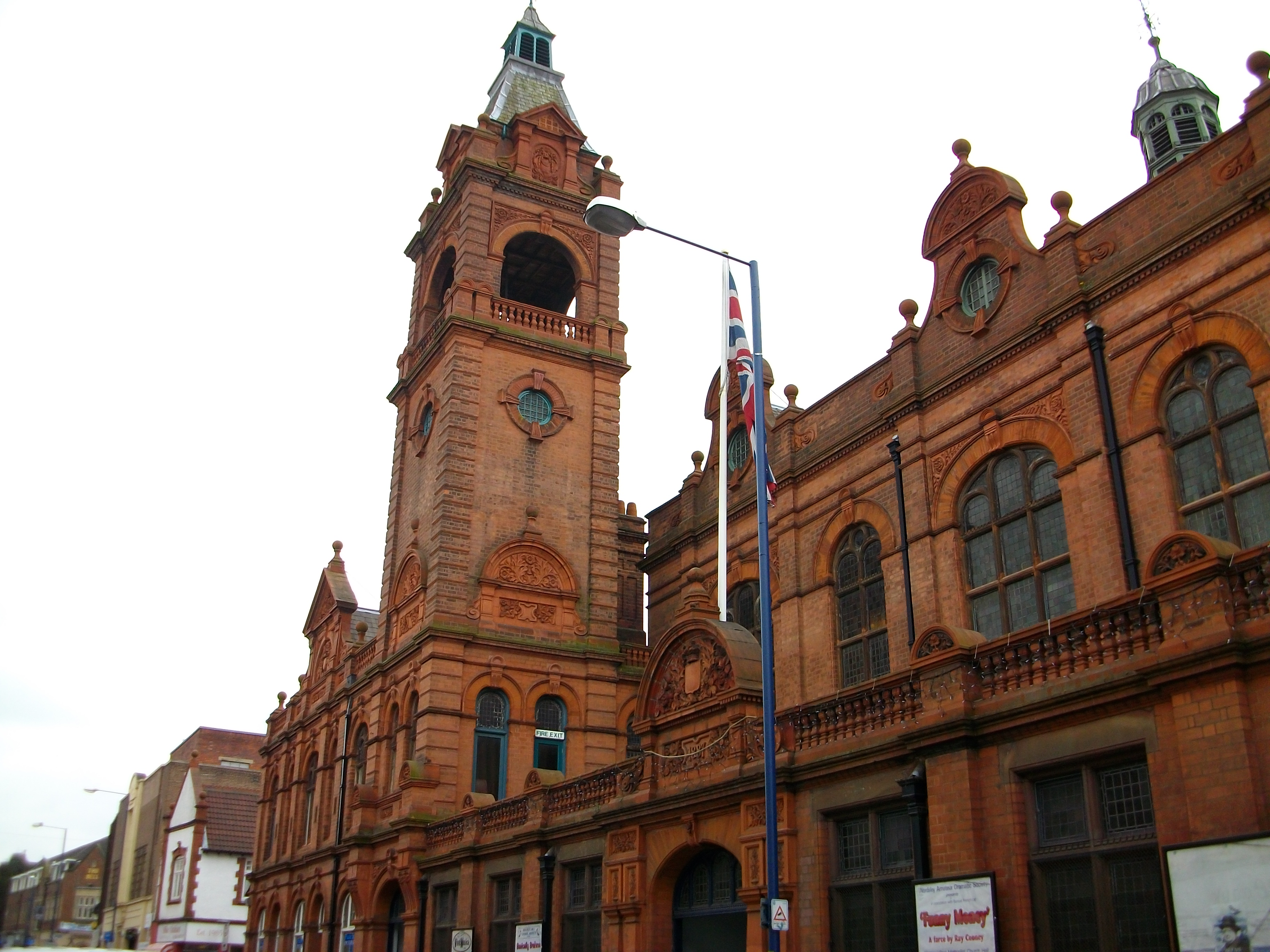
Stourbridge Town Hall

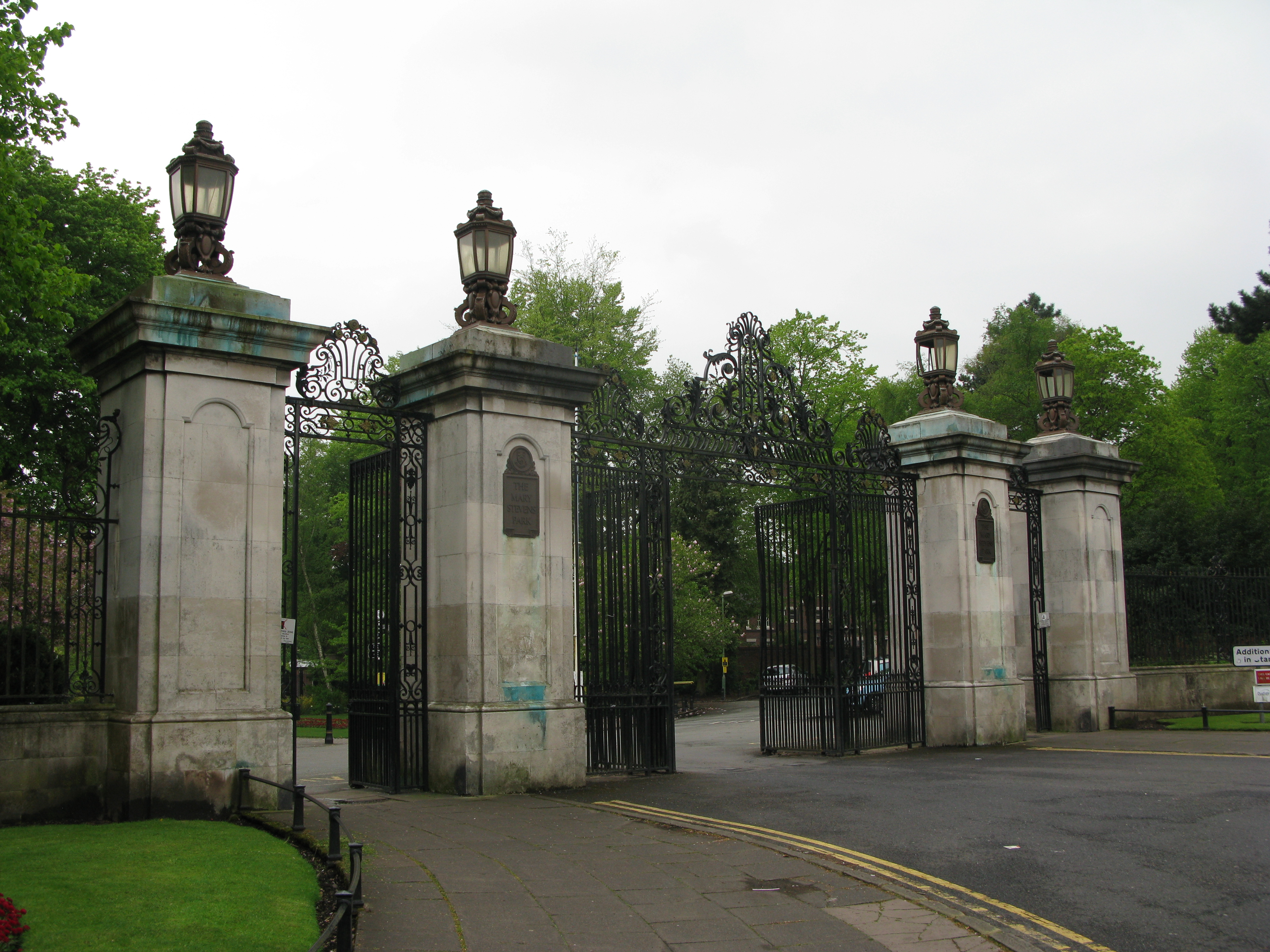
- Mary Stevens Park
  Black Country Living Museum
- Clent Hills
- Hagley Hall
- Kinver Edge Rock Houses
- Mary Stevens Park
- Red House Cone
- Stambermill Viaduct
- Stourbridge Canal
- Stourbridge Glass Museum
- Stourbridge Town Hall
- Wychbury Hill
- River Stour (Stambermill Woods)

=== Places of worship ===
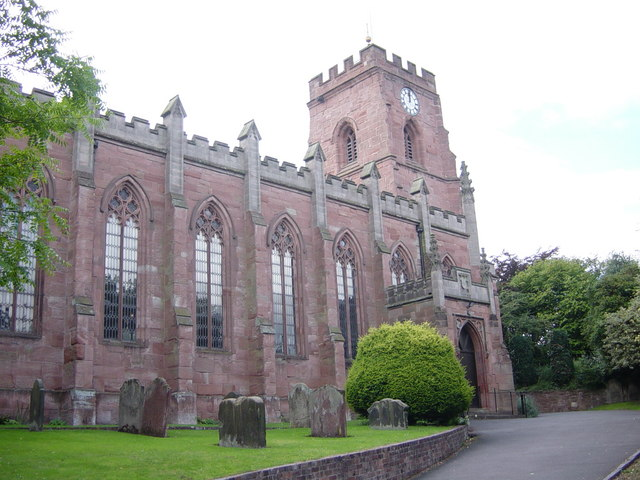
St Mary's parish church, Oldswinford, Stourbridge

According to the 2011 Census, the majority of people living in Stourbridge identify as Christian (65%). Almost a quarter of people said they had no religion. Less than 1% of people identified as Muslim, Sikh, Buddhist, or Hindu. 43 people identified as a Jedi Knight.

- Chawn Hill Church, Stourbridge
- Ghausia Jamia Mosque, Lye
- Holy Trinity Church, Amblecote
- Hope Baptist Church, Stourbridge
- Our Lady and All Saints Catholic Church, Stourbridge
- Presbyterian Unitarian Chapel, Stourbridge.
- Quaker Meeting House, Stourbridge
- St James' Church, Wollaston
- St Mary's, Oldswinford
- St Thomas' Church, Stourbridge
- St Peter's, Pedmore
- Church of Latter Day Saints, Stourbridge

== Notable residents ==
Business

- James Foster, ironmaster, mine operator and banker. He was instrumental in bringing the first commercial steam locomotive into the Midlands
- Thomas Webb, founder of Thomas Webb & Sons

Entertainment

- Kenton Allen, television producer and executive (The Royle Family, Six Shooter), attended King Edward VI College
- Peter Powell, former BBC Radio 1 disc jockey and ex-husband of Anthea Turner.

Performing arts

- Walter Braithwaite, composer, pianist, teacher
- Johnny Briggs, actor, Coronation Street
- Dave Cartwright, singer-songwriter, broadcaster and author
- Clint Mansell, English musician, composer, and former lead singer and guitarist of the band Pop Will Eat Itself, attended King Edward VI College
- Jan Pearson, actress, Holby City, Doctors, born in Wollaston
- Jonn Penney, musician - Ned's Atomic Dustbin
- Robert Plant, singer with Led Zeppelin, attended King Edward VI College
- Esther Smith, actress known for her work in the television series Uncle and Cuckoo
- Anthony Bate, actor known for his role as Oliver Lacon in BBC adaptations of Tinker Tailor Soldier Spy and Smiley's People, was born in Stourbridge.
- Trevor Harrison, actor best known for his role as Eddie Grundy in the BBC Radio 4 soap opera, The Archers
- Lyndsie Holland, opera singer born in Pedmore
- The Wonder Stuff, indie music group based in Stourbridge

Science and academia

- Kathleen Booth, inventor of the first computer assembly language
- Kay Davies, geneticist
- David Trotman, pure mathematician, attended King Edward VI College
- Clement Lindley Wragge, meteorologist

Sports and games

- Don Kenyon, cricketer, captain of Worcestershire
- Matt Neal, motor racing driver
- Dan O'Hagan, BBC Match of the Day football commentator
- Ronnie O'Sullivan, snooker player, born in Wordsley Hospital in 1975
- Jude Bellingham, professional footballer who currently plays for Real Madrid CF, born in Stourbridge
- Jobe Bellingham, professional footballer who currently plays for Borussia Dortmund, born in Stourbridge
- Alf Bishop, born in Stourbridge, professional footballer Wolverhampton Wanderers
- Matthew Round-Garrido, motor racing driver
- Maria Catalano, snooker player
- Tony Marsh, Formula One racing driver
- Dean Headley, cricketer for England, Middlesex and Kent
- Hannah Payton, UCI women's road racing cyclist
- George Robson rugby union player for Harlequins
- Alex Nicholls, former professional footballer for teams including Walsall and Dundee United
- Steve Cooper, former professional footballer
- Tom Milnes, cricketer
- Colin Gordon, former professional footballer, manager and football agent
- Joy Beasley, former swimmer who competed at the 1976 and 1980 Summer Olympic Games
- Reece Devine, professional footballer
- Richard Hancox, former professional footballer
- David McDermott, former professional footballer
- Sam Austin, professional footballer
- Max Stelling, former professional Rugby Union player for Worcester Warriors attended Old Swinford Hospital
- Sam Field (footballer), professional footballer
- Joe Bache, born in Stourbridge, professional footballer for Aston Villa

Writers

- Jerome K. Jerome, author Three Men in a Boat, lived at Stourbridge in childhood before his family moved to London
- Samuel Johnson, lexicographer, lived and worked in Stourbridge for a time
- David Massey, author of Torn and Taken published worldwide by The Chicken House
- S. J. Watson, author of Before I Go to Sleep
- Brett Westwood, radio presenter and author

Others

- William Henry Bury, murderer and Jack the Ripper suspect
- Frank Foley, the relatively little-known "British Schindler" retired to Stourbridge. There is a memorial to him in Mary Stevens Park
- Rachel Trevor-Morgan, milliner to the Queen
- Sir Alexander Cumming Gordon Madden KCB CBE, RN, a senior Royal Navy officer who went on to be Second Sea Lord and Chief of Naval Personnel

== In popular culture ==
- The fictional Middle-earth world of Mordor in The Lord of the Rings trilogy is believed to have been inspired by the Black Country of the Victorian era. Author J. R. R. Tolkien grew up in the area.
- The television adaptation of Murder Before Evensong by Richard Coles was filmed in Stourbridge locations including Mary Stevens Park.
