= Dudley Metropolitan Borough Council elections =

Local government elections in Dudley, England

Dudley Metropolitan Borough Council elections are held three years out of every four, with a third of the council elected each time. Dudley Metropolitan Borough Council is the local authority for the metropolitan borough of Dudley in the West Midlands, England. Since the last boundary changes in 2004, 72 councillors have been elected from 24 wards.

== Election results ==
Composition of the council
Year	Conservative	Labour	Liberal Democrats (Note: Includes totals for the predecessors of the Liberal Democrats, the Liberal Party and SDP (both of which participated in the Alliance).)	UKIP	Green (Note: Includes totals for the predecessors of the Green Party of England and Wales, the Ecology Party and Green Party UK.)	Independents & Others	Council control after election
Local government reorganisation; council established (66 seats)
1973	24	40	1	–	–	1	Labour
1975	29	35	1	–	0	1	Labour
1976	37	26	2	–	0	1	Conservative
1978	42	22	1	–	0	1	Conservative
1979	38	26	1	–	0	1	Conservative
1980	30	32	0	–	0	4	No overall control
New ward boundaries (72 seats)
1982	40	29	3	–	0	0	Conservative
1983	42	29	1	–	0	0	Conservative
1984	35	36	1	–	0	0	No overall control
1986	25	46	0	–	0	1	Labour
1987	31	41	0	–	0	0	Labour
1988	31	41	0	–	0	0	Labour
1990	31	41	0	–	0	0	Labour
1991	29	43	0	–	0	0	Labour
1992	36	36	0	–	0	0	No overall control
1994	33	38	1	0	0	0	Labour
1995	20	50	2	0	0	0	Labour
1996	8	60	4	0	0	0	Labour
1998	7	58	7	0	0	0	Labour
1999	8	54	10	0	0	0	Labour
2000	18	43	11	0	0	0	Labour
2002	24	37	11	0	0	0	Labour
2003	31	30	10	0	0	1 (Note: 1 BNP)	No overall control
New ward boundaries (72 seats)
2004	40	25	7	0	0	0	Conservative
2006	40	26	5	0	0	1	Conservative
2007	39	28	5	0	0	0	Conservative
2008	43	26	2	1	0	0	No overall control
2010	44	26	1	1	0	0	Conservative
2011	43	28	0	1	0	0	Conservative
2012	30	41	0	0	1	0	Labour
2014	20	40	0	7	1	4	Labour
2015	25	38	0	7	1	1	Labour
2016	29	35	0	8	0	0	No overall control
2018	35	36	0	1	0	0	No overall control
2019	36	36	0	0	0	0	No overall control
2021	46	24	0	0	0	2	Conservative
2022	46	26	0	0	0	0	Conservative
2023	44	27	0	0	0	1	Conservative
New ward boundaries (72 seats)
2024	34	34	3	0	0	1	No overall control

== Council elections ==
- 1998 Dudley Metropolitan Borough Council election
- 1999 Dudley Metropolitan Borough Council election
- 2000 Dudley Metropolitan Borough Council election
- 2002 Dudley Metropolitan Borough Council election
- 2003 Dudley Metropolitan Borough Council election
- 2004 Dudley Metropolitan Borough Council election (new ward boundaries)
- 2006 Dudley Metropolitan Borough Council election
- 2007 Dudley Metropolitan Borough Council election
- 2008 Dudley Metropolitan Borough Council election
- 2010 Dudley Metropolitan Borough Council election
- 2011 Dudley Metropolitan Borough Council election
- 2012 Dudley Metropolitan Borough Council election
- 2014 Dudley Metropolitan Borough Council election
- 2015 Dudley Metropolitan Borough Council election
- 2016 Dudley Metropolitan Borough Council election
- 2018 Dudley Metropolitan Borough Council election
- 2019 Dudley Metropolitan Borough Council election
- 2021 Dudley Metropolitan Borough Council election
- 2022 Dudley Metropolitan Borough Council election
- 2023 Dudley Metropolitan Borough Council election
- 2024 Dudley Metropolitan Borough Council election (new ward boundaries)

== Results maps ==
2004 results map

2006 results map

2007 results map

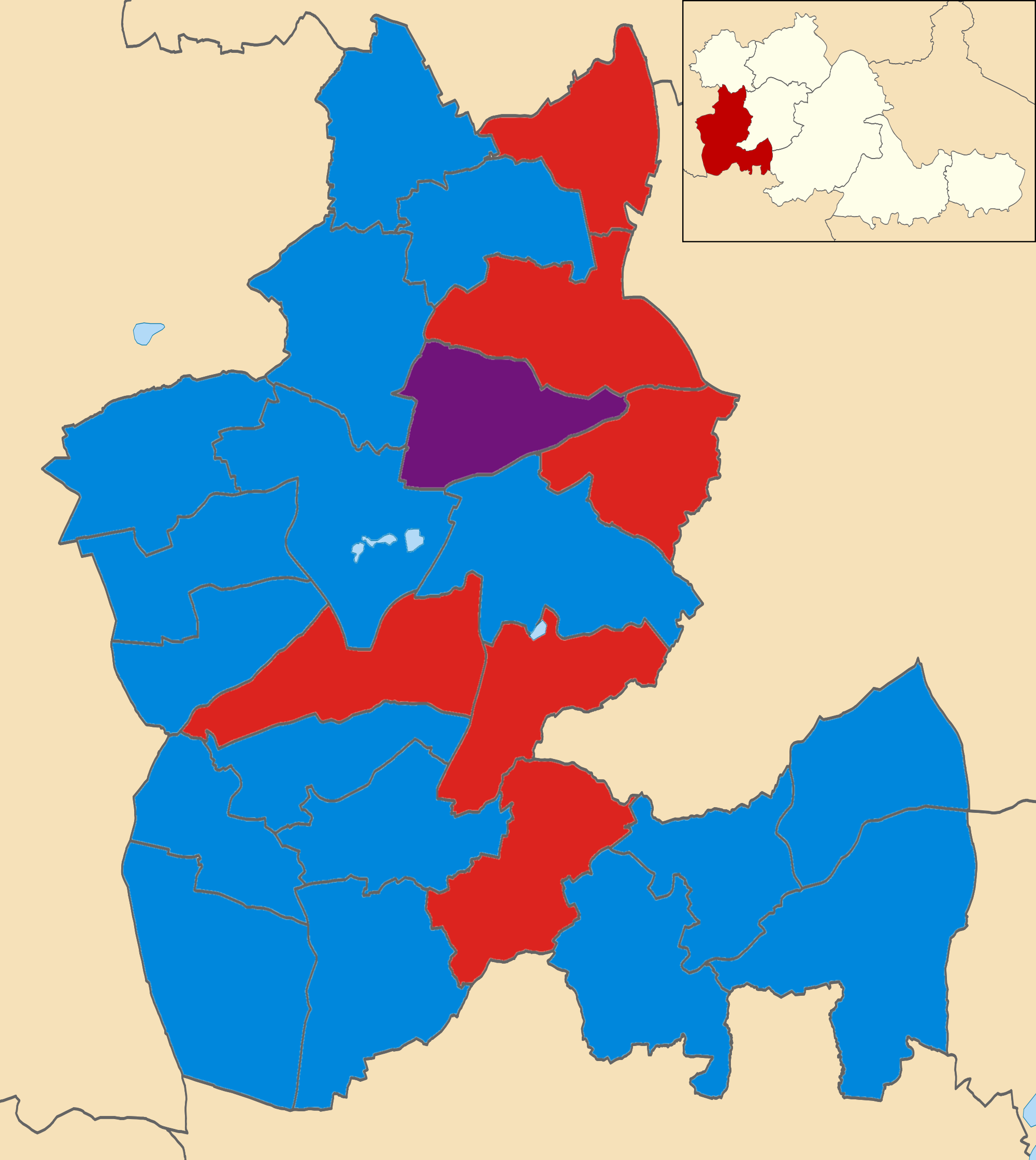
2008 results map

2010 results map

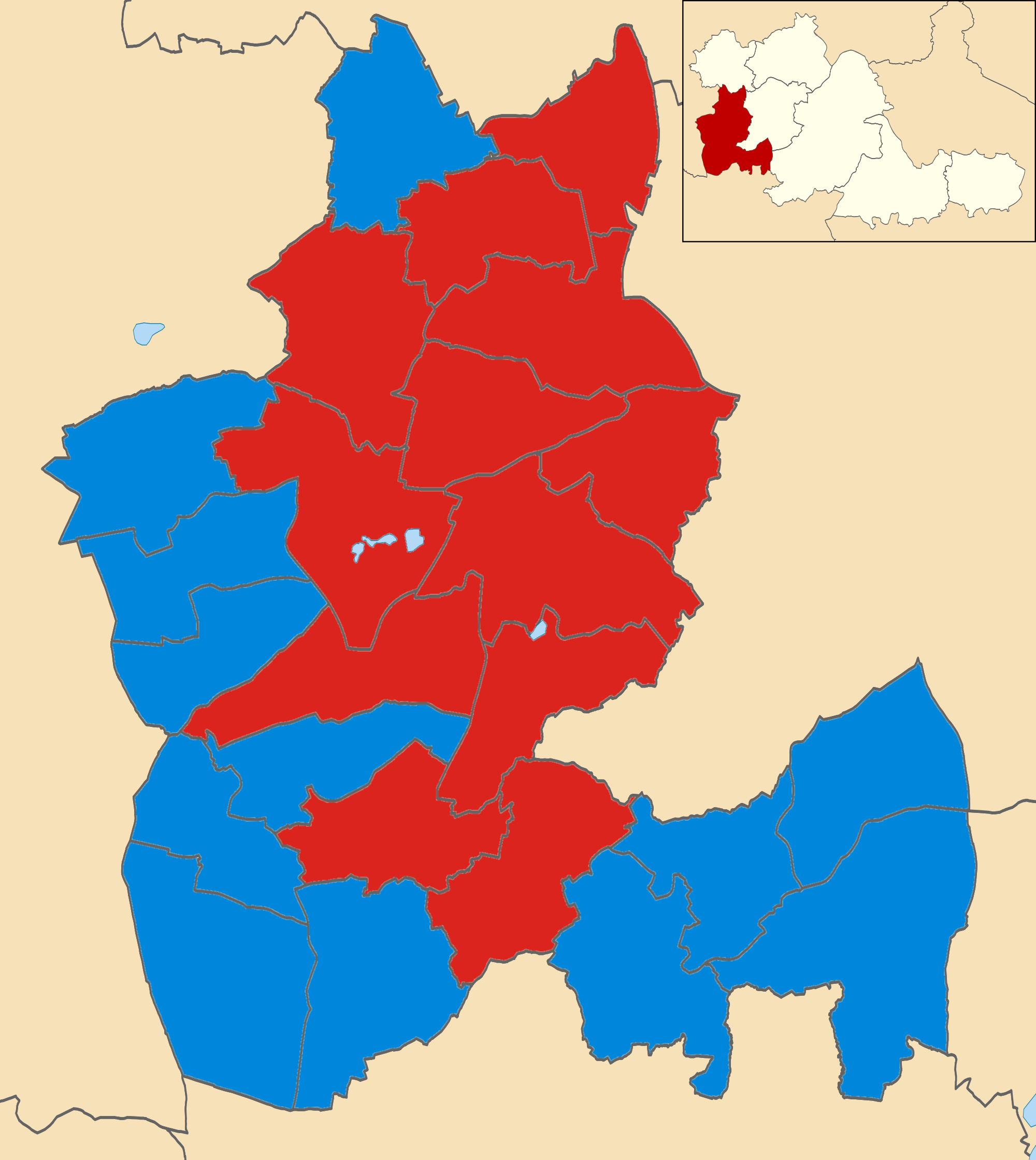
2011 results map

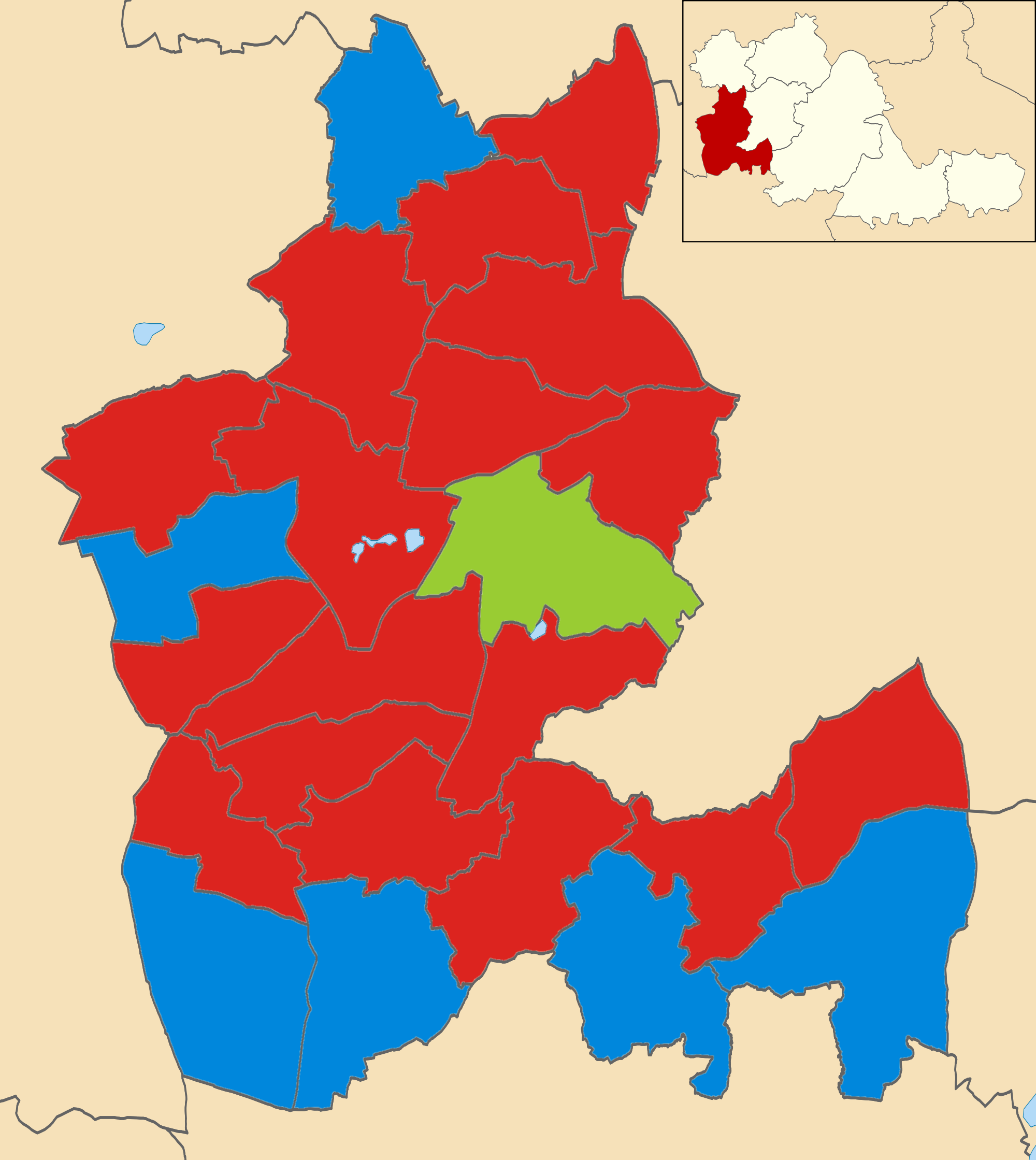
2012 results map

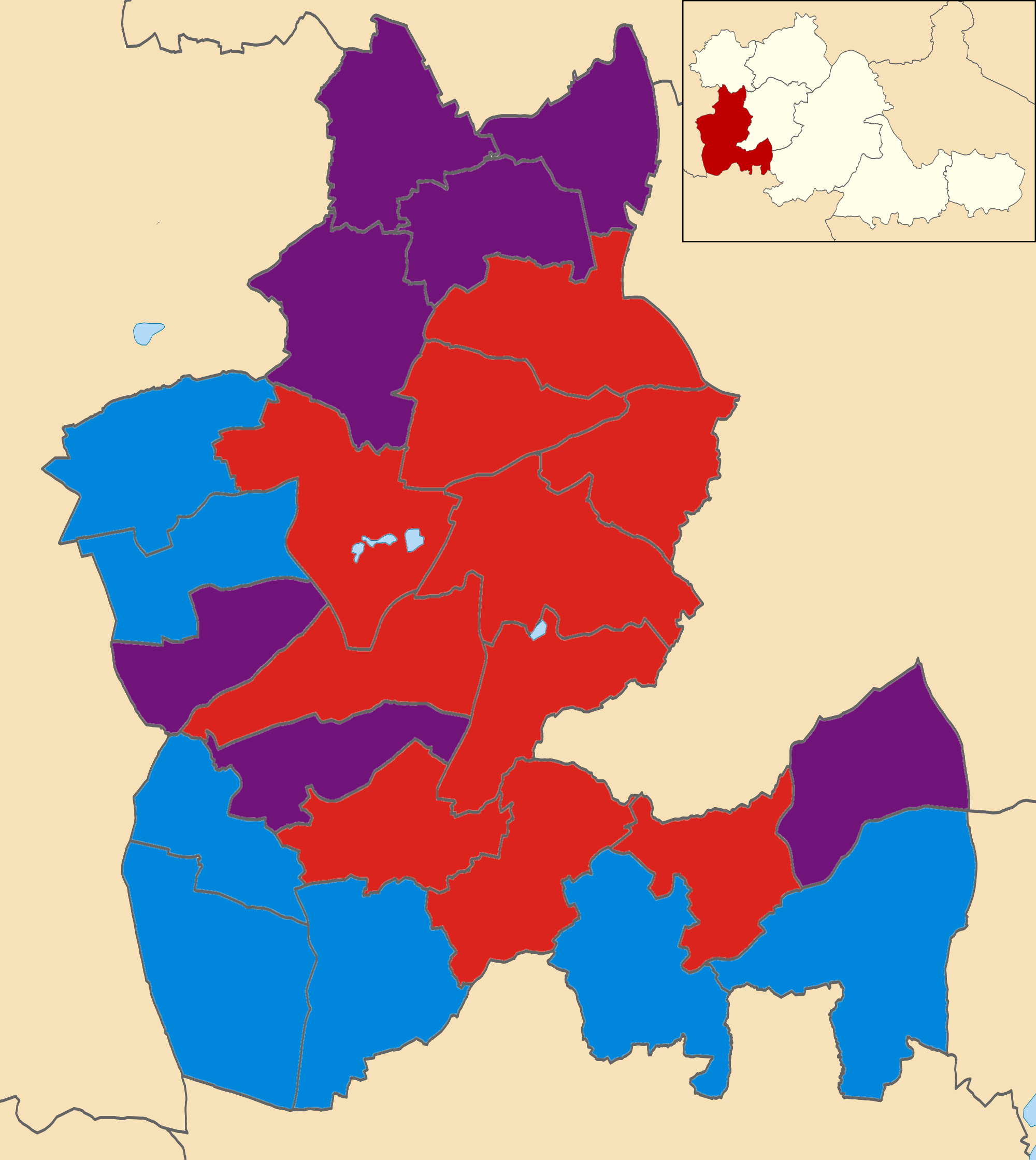
2014 results map

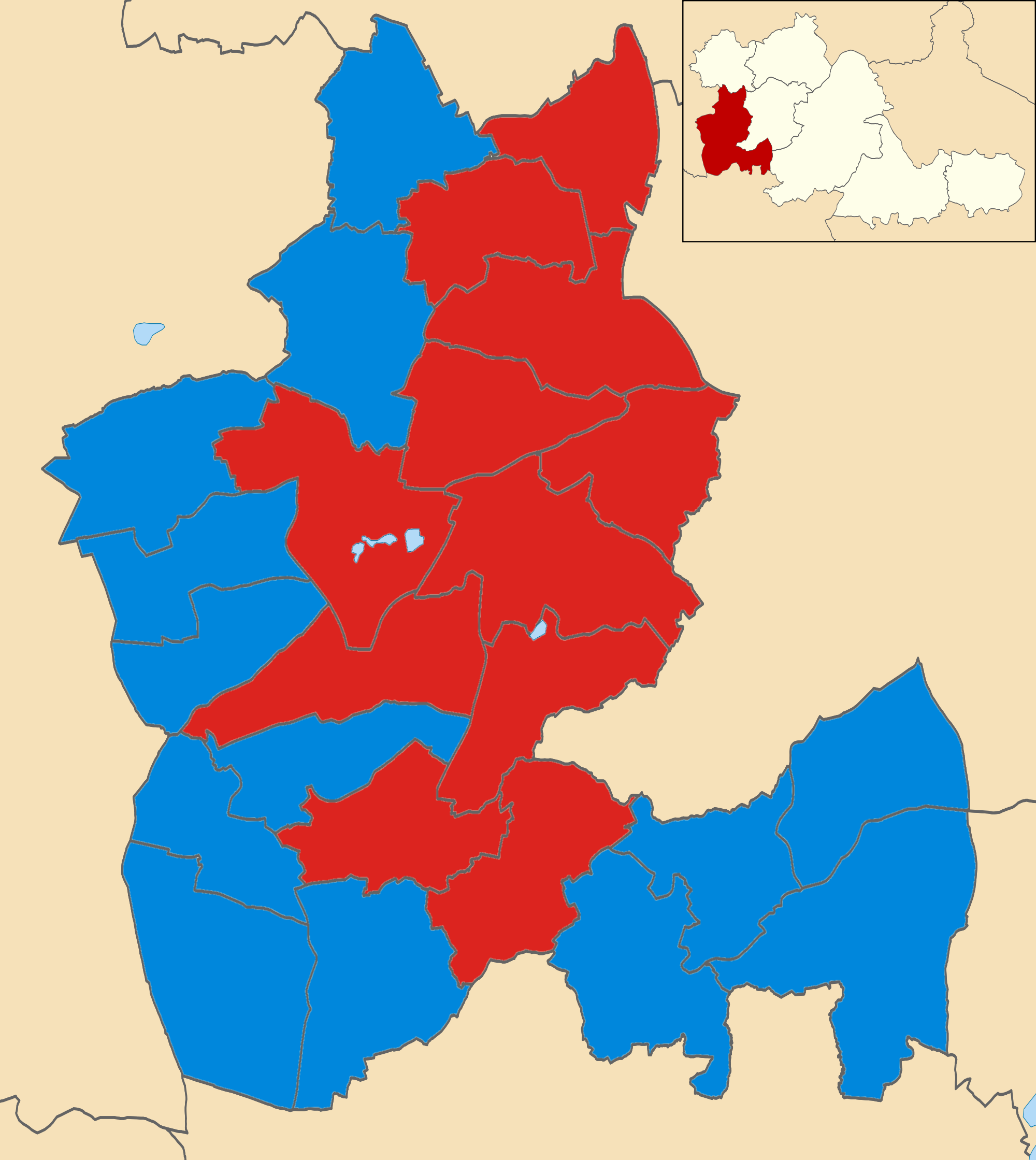
2015 results map

2016 results map

2018 results map

2019 results map

2021 results map

2022 results map

2023 results map

2024 results map

2026 results map

== By-election results ==
=== 1998–2002 ===
Halesowen South By-Election 9 July 1998
Party	Candidate	Votes	%	±%
Conservative	John Woodall	1,333	56.5	+5.4
Labour	Nigel Hodgetts	777	32.9	−4.1
Liberal Democrats	Stanley Robert Ratcliff	249	10.6	−1.3
Majority		556	23.6	
Turnout		2,359	23.0	
Conservative hold		Swing		

=== 2002–2006 ===
St Andrews By-Election 18 October 2001
Party	Candidate	Votes	%	±%
Labour	Phil Higgins	794	62.2	+14.3
Conservative	Steve Ridley	358	28.0	−13.3
Liberal Democrats	Tim Fletcher	125	9.8	−1.0
Majority		436	34.2	
Turnout		1,277	13.6	
Labour hold		Swing		

=== 2010–2014 ===
Norton by-election, 21 June 2012
Party	Candidate	Votes	%	±%
Conservative	Colin Elcock	1,375	51.2	+3.1
Labour	Adnan Rashid	633	23.6	−0.9
Liberal Democrats	Chris Bramall	259	9.6	+2.3
UKIP	Glenn Wilson	229	8.5	−5.0
Green	Benjamin Sweeney	143	5.3	−1.3
National Front	Kevin Inman	47	1.7	+1.7
Majority		742	27.6	
Turnout		2,686		
Labour hold		Swing		

Wollaston and Stourbridge Town By election, 1 February 2013
Party	Candidate	Votes	%	±%
Labour Co-op	Barbara Sykes	847	35.8	−1.5
Conservative	Matt Rogers	787	33.3	+0.9
UKIP	Barbara Deeley	249	10.5	+0.8
Independent	Russell Eden	211	8.9	+8.9
Liberal Democrats	Christopher Bramall	169	7.1	−5.7
BNP	Ken Griffiths	96	4.1	+4.1
Green	Ben Sweeney	7	0.3	+0.3
Majority		60	25.4	
Turnout		2,366		
Labour gain from Conservative		Swing		

Coseley East Ward by-election, 19 September 2013
Party	Candidate	Votes	%	±%
Labour	Clem Baugh	1,053	55.7	+1.3
UKIP	Star Etheridge	478	25.3	+8.2
Conservative	Julian Ryder	190	10.1	−8.5
BNP	Ken Griffiths	120	6.3	+6.3
Green	Becky Blatchford	33	1.7	−1.1
National Front	Kevin Inman	16	0.8	−2.0
Majority		575	30.4	
Turnout		1,890		
Labour hold		Swing		

=== 2014–2018 ===
Kingswinford North and Wall Heath by-election, 25 February 2016
Party	Candidate	Votes	%	±%
Conservative	Edward Lawrence	1,456	53.8	+3.9
Labour	Lynn Boleyn	934	34.5	+8.1
UKIP	Mick Forsyth	262	9.7	−11.4
Green	Andi Mohr	52	1,9	−0.8
Majority		522	19.3	
Turnout		2,704		
Conservative hold		Swing		

St James's by-election, 25 February 2016
Party	Candidate	Votes	%	±%
Labour	Cathryn Bayton	847	46.3	+1.3
UKIP	Graeme Lloyd	554	30.3	+2.3
Conservative	Wayne Sullivan	427	23.4	−0.4
Majority		293	16.0	
Turnout		1,828		
Labour hold		Swing		

St Thomas's by-election, 16 February 2017
Party	Candidate	Votes	%	±%
Labour	Shaneila Mughal	1,466	60.6	+17.9
UKIP	Phil Wimlett	653	27.0	−2.8
Conservative	Jonathan Elliott	249	10.3	−11.9
Green	Francis Sheppard	52	2.1	−1.2
Majority		813	33.6	
Turnout		2,420		
Labour hold		Swing		

=== 2022–2026 ===
Cradley and Wollescote by-election, 3 August 2023
Party	Candidate	Votes	%	±%
Liberal Democrats	Ryan Priest	1,321	52.4	+14.5
Labour	Rachael Gardener	771	30.6	–8.1
Conservative	Steve Hill	353	14.0	–4.9
Green	Kash Khan	69	2.7	–0.6
TUSC	Siobhan Friel	5	0.2	–0.7
Majority		550	21.8	
Turnout		2,526		
Liberal Democrats gain from Labour		Swing		

St James's by-election, 24 August 2023
Party	Candidate	Votes	%	±%
Labour	Caroline Reid	816	48.0	–5.9
Conservative	Rab Rana	719	42.3	+1.7
Independent	Richard Tasker	84	4.9	+4.9
Green	Christian Kiever	50	2.9	+2.9
Liberal Democrats	Abdul Qadus	32	1.9	−3.6
Majority		97	5.7	
Turnout		1,701		
Labour gain from Conservative		Swing		

Brockmoor and Pensnett by-election, 19 December 2024
Party	Candidate	Votes	%	±%
Conservative	Alex Dale	571	35.4	
Reform	Richard Tasker	485	30.1	
Labour	Karen Jordan	466	28.9	
Green	Ant Dugmore	49	3.0	
Liberal Democrats	David Sheppard	24	1.5	
Independent	Cassie Gray	16	1.0	
Majority		86	5.3	
Turnout		1,611		
Conservative gain from Labour		Swing		

=== 2026–2030 ===
St James's by-election, 29 October 2026
Party	Candidate	Votes	%	±%
Labour	Caroline Reid	874	38.0	+16.2
Reform	Chris Chivers	872	37.9	−11.0
Conservative	Sam Firmstone	317	13.8	–0.1
Restore	Tristian Owens	159	6.9	+6.9
Green	Katherine Poole	79	3.4	–7.2
Majority		2	0.1	
Turnout		2,301		
Labour gain from Reform		Swing		
