= 2022 Dudley Metropolitan Borough Council election =

2022 local election in Dudley

- 5 May 2022

25 out of 72 seats to Dudley Metropolitan Borough Council 37 seats needed for a majority

| | First party | Second party |
|---|---|---|
| Leader | Patrick Harley | Qadar Zada |
| Party | Conservative | Labour |
| Last election | 46 seats, 57.1% | 24 seats, 33.4% |
| Seats before | 45 | 23 |
| Seats won | 13 | 12 |
| Seats after | 46 | 26 |
| Seat change | Steady | ▲2 |
| Popular vote | 36,015 | 31,452 |
| Percentage | 48.6% | 42.4% |
| Swing | ▼8.5% | ▲9.0% |
- Winner of each seat at the 2022 Dudley Metropolitan Borough Council election
Council control before election
Conservative
Council control after election
Conservative

The 2022 Dudley Metropolitan Borough Council election took place on 5 May 2022. One third of councillors—24 out of 72—on Dudley Metropolitan Borough Council were elected, with 1 ward (Halesowen South) electing 2 councillors. The election took place alongside other local elections across the United Kingdom.

In the previous council election in 2021, the Conservatives gained a majority on the council, holding 46 seats after the election with Labour holding 24 of the others, with two independent councillors.

== Background ==
=== History ===
Result of the council election when these seats were last contested in 2018

Result of the previous council election in 2021

The Local Government Act 1972 created a two-tier system of metropolitan counties and districts covering Greater Manchester, Merseyside, South Yorkshire, Tyne and Wear, the West Midlands, and West Yorkshire starting in 1974. Dudley was a district of the West Midlands metropolitan county. The Local Government Act 1985 abolished the metropolitan counties, with metropolitan districts taking on most of their powers as metropolitan boroughs. The West Midlands Combined Authority was created in 2016 and began electing the mayor of the West Midlands from 2017, which was given strategic powers covering a region coterminous with the former West Midlands metropolitan county.

Dudley Council has variously been under Labour control, Conservative control and no overall control since it was established. The Conservatives controlled the council from the 2004 election until Labour gained control in the 2012 election. Labour lost overall control in the 2016 election but continued to lead the council until 2017, when the Conservatives led the council, still without a majority. In the most recent election in 2021, the Conservatives gained twelve seats at the expense of Labour and the UK Independence Party to hold an overall majority of seats, with 46 of the 72 total. Labour held 24 of the remaining seats, and there were two independents.

Positions up for election in 2022 were last elected in 2018. In that election the Conservatives won 14 seats and Labour won 10.

== Electoral process ==
The council elects its councillors in thirds, with a third being up for election every year for three years, with no election in the fourth year. The election will take place by first-past-the-post voting, with wards generally being represented by three councillors, with one elected in each election year to serve a four-year term.

All registered electors (British, Irish, Commonwealth and European Union citizens) living in Dudley aged 18 or over will be entitled to vote in the election. People who live at two addresses in different councils, such as university students with different term-time and holiday addresses, are entitled to be registered for and vote in elections in both local authorities. Voting in-person at polling stations will take place from 07:00 to 22:00 on election day, and voters will be able to apply for postal votes or proxy votes in advance of the election.

== Campaign ==
Peter Walker, the political correspondent for The Guardian, wrote that Labour would want to "show progress" in the council. The Conservative council leader Patrick Harley said he was confident that his party would gain seats in the election.

== Previous council composition ==
| After 2021 election | | Before 2022 election | | After 2022 election | |
| Party | Seats | Party | Seats | Party | Seats |
|---|---|---|---|---|---|
| Conservative | 46 | Conservative | 45 | Conservative | 46 |
| Labour | 24 | Labour | 23 | Labour | 26 |
| Independent | 2 | Independent | 3 | Independent | 0 |

Changes:

- February 2022: David Vickers (Conservative) dies; seat left vacant until 2022 election
- March 2022: Zafar Islam suspended from Labour

== Results summary ==
2022 Dudley Borough Council election
| Party | This election | | | | Full council | | | This election | | |
| Party | Candidates | Seats | Net | Seats % | Other | Total | Total % | Votes | Votes % | +/− |
|---|---|---|---|---|---|---|---|---|---|---|
| Conservative | {{{candidates}}} | 13 | Steady | 52.0 | 33 | 46 | 63.9 | 36,015 | 48.6 | -8.5 |
| Labour | {{{candidates}}} | 12 | ▲2 | 48.0 | 14 | 26 | 36.1 | 31,452 | 42.4 | +9.0 |
| Liberal Democrats | {{{candidates}}} | 0 | Steady | 0.0 | 0 | 0 | 0.0 | 4,360 | 5.9 | +1.7 |
| Green | {{{candidates}}} | 0 | Steady | 0.0 | 0 | 0 | 0.0 | 965 | 1.3 | -1.3 |
| Libertarian | {{{candidates}}} | 0 | Steady | 0.0 | 0 | 0 | 0.0 | 729 | 1.0 | +0.5 |
| TUSC | {{{candidates}}} | 0 | Steady | 0.0 | 0 | 0 | 0.0 | 224 | 0.3 | +0.2 |
| Independent | {{{candidates}}} | 0 | ▼2 | 0.0 | 0 | 0 | 0.0 | 204 | 0.3 | +0.1 |
| Reform | {{{candidates}}} | 0 | Steady | 0.0 | 0 | 0 | 0.0 | 89 | 0.1 | -0.1 |
| Freedom Alliance | {{{candidates}}} | 0 | Steady | 0.0 | 0 | 0 | 0.0 | 88 | 0.1 | +0.1 |

Seat change includes Halesowen South, which was last elected in 2021.

== Results by ward ==
An asterisk indicates an incumbent councillor.

=== Amblecote ===
Amblecote
| Party | Candidate | Votes | % | ±% |
|---|---|---|---|---|
| Conservative | Paul Bradley* | 1,644 | 56.53 | −1.3 |
| Labour | Rhianna Parsons | 982 | 33.77 | +2.9 |
| Liberal Democrats | Ian Flynn | 164 | 5.64 | +2.2 |
| Green | Adrian Mabe | 111 | 3.82 | +0.1 |
| Majority | | 662 | 22.8 | |
| Turnout | | 2,908 | 29.0 | |
| Rejected ballots | | 7 | 0.24 | |
| Conservative hold | | Swing | | |

=== Belle Vale ===
Belle Vale
| Party | Candidate | Votes | % | ±% |
|---|---|---|---|---|
| Conservative | Peter Dobb* | 1,516 | 47.24 | −2.3 |
| Labour | Savannah Southorn | 1,305 | 40.67 | +6.4 |
| Green | John Payne | 190 | 5.92 | −2.1 |
| Liberal Democrats | Sarah Furhuraire | 179 | 5.58 | +1.9 |
| Majority | | 211 | 6.6 | |
| Turnout | | 3,209 | 31.74 | |
| Rejected ballots | | 19 | 0.59 | |
| Conservative hold | | Swing | | |

=== Brierley Hill ===
Brierley Hill
| Party | Candidate | Votes | % | ±% |
|---|---|---|---|---|
| Labour | John Martin | 1,132 | 46.62 | +12.2 |
| Conservative | Ben Corfield | 960 | 39.54 | −18.4 |
| Libertarian | Wayne Lewis | 226 | 9.31 | N/A |
| Reform | Austin Ward | 89 | 3.67 | +0.4 |
| Majority | | 172 | 7.1 | |
| Turnout | | 2,428 | 24.0 | |
| Rejected ballots | | 21 | 0.82 | |
| Labour hold | | Swing | | |

The incumbent councillor, Zafar Islam, was elected for the Labour Party but suspended in March 2022.

=== Brockmoor and Pensnett ===
Brockmoor and Pensnett
| Party | Candidate | Votes | % | ±% |
|---|---|---|---|---|
| Labour | Judy Foster* | 1,527 | 64.29 | +30.6 |
| Conservative | Mark Webb | 826 | 34.78 | −9.9 |
| Majority | | 701 | 29.8 | |
| Turnout | | 2,375 | 23.88 | |
| Rejected ballots | | 22 | 0.93 | |
| Labour hold | | Swing | | |

=== Castle and Priory ===
Castle and Priory
| Party | Candidate | Votes | % | ±% |
|---|---|---|---|---|
| Labour | Keiran Casey | 1,700 | 63.39 | +15.6 |
| Conservative | Mick Wolohan | 962 | 35.87 | −10.9 |
| Majority | | 738 | 27.7 | |
| Turnout | | 2,682 | 23.85 | |
| Rejected ballots | | 20 | 0.75 | |
| Labour hold | | Swing | | |

=== Coseley East ===
Coseley East
| Party | Candidate | Votes | % | ±% |
|---|---|---|---|---|
| Labour | Marian Howard | 1,333 | 62.67 | +10.6 |
| Conservative | Matt Cook | 765 | 35.97 | −6.0 |
| Majority | | 568 | 27.1 | |
| Turnout | | 2,127 | 22.82 | |
| Rejected ballots | | 29 | 1.36 | |
| Labour hold | | Swing | | |

=== Cradley and Wollescote ===
Cradley and Wollescote
| Party | Candidate | Votes | % | ±% |
|---|---|---|---|---|
| Labour | Tim Crumpton* | 1,153 | 38.59 | ±0.0 |
| Liberal Democrats | Ryan Priest | 915 | 30.62 | +19.9 |
| Conservative | Jason Thorne | 905 | 30.29 | −13.6 |
| Majority | | 238 | 8.0 | |
| Turnout | | 2,988 | 31.46 | |
| Rejected ballots | | 15 | 0.50 | |
| Labour hold | | Swing | | |

=== Gornal ===
Gornal
| Party | Candidate | Votes | % | ±% |
|---|---|---|---|---|
| Conservative | Bryn Challenor* | 1,882 | 65.23 | −2.5 |
| Labour | Karl Denning | 972 | 33.69 | +8.7 |
| Majority | | 910 | 31.8 | |
| Turnout | | 2,854 | 28.48 | |
| Rejected ballots | | 31 | 1.07 | |
| Conservative hold | | Swing | | |

=== Halesowen North ===
Halesowen North
| Party | Candidate | Votes | % | ±% |
|---|---|---|---|---|
| Labour | Hilary Bills | 1,850 | 56.85 | +14.4 |
| Conservative | Mitch Bolton | 1,231 | 37.83 | −16.3 |
| Liberal Democrats | Mollie Priest | 157 | 4.82 | +1.8 |
| Majority | | 619 | 19.1 | |
| Turnout | | 3,254 | 33.77 | |
| Rejected ballots | | 16 | 0.48 | |
| Labour gain from Conservative | | Swing | | |

=== Halesowen South ===
Halesowen South
| Party | Candidate | Votes | % | ±% |
|---|---|---|---|---|
| Conservative | Jonathan Elliott | 1,806 | 52.7 | −10.9 |
| Conservative | Thomas Russon | 1,696 | 49.5 | −14.1 |
| Labour | Mahdi Mutahar | 904 | 26.4 | +3.4 |
| Labour Co-op | Donella Russell | 874 | 25.5 | +2.5 |
| Green | James Windridge | 437 | 12.7 | +6.9 |
| Liberal Democrats | Tracey Gregg | 330 | 9.6 | +5.6 |
| Independent | Tim Weller | 204 | 5.9 | N/A |
| Majority | | 792 | 23.1 | |
| Turnout | | 3,429 | 36.28 | |
| Rejected ballots | | 17 | 0.27 | |
| Conservative hold | | Swing | | |
| Conservative gain from Independent | | Swing | | |

Ray Burston, the outgoing incumbent, was elected as a Conservative but had the whip withdrawn in December 2020.

=== Hayley Green and Cradley South ===
Hayley Green and Cradley South
| Party | Candidate | Votes | % | ±% |
|---|---|---|---|---|
| Conservative | Andrea Goddard* | 1,686 | 57.29 | −8.4 |
| Labour | Tony Barnsley | 1,056 | 35.88 | +10.4 |
| Liberal Democrats | Ethan Stafford | 180 | 6.12 | +0.4 |
| Majority | | 630 | 21.6 | |
| Turnout | | 2,943 | 32.57 | |
| Rejected ballots | | 21 | 0.82 | |
| Conservative hold | | Swing | | |

=== Kingswinford North and Wall Heath ===
Kingswinford North and Wall Heath
| Party | Candidate | Votes | % | ±% |
|---|---|---|---|---|
| Conservative | Edward Lawrence* | 2,244 | 62.26 | +5.0 |
| Labour | Sarah Daniel | 1,107 | 30.72 | +3.2 |
| Liberal Democrats | Jonathan Bramall | 219 | 6.08 | −0.8 |
| Majority | | 1,137 | 31.8 | |
| Turnout | | 3,604 | 37.08 | |
| Rejected ballots | | 34 | 0.94 | |
| Conservative hold | | Swing | | |

=== Kingswinford South ===
Kingswinford South
| Party | Candidate | Votes | % | ±% |
|---|---|---|---|---|
| Conservative | Patrick Harley* | 1,933 | 58.70 | +0.6 |
| Labour | Simon Daniel | 979 | 29.73 | +3.3 |
| Liberal Democrats | Elizabeth Geeves | 363 | 11.02 | −3.9 |
| Majority | | 954 | 29.1 | |
| Turnout | | 3,293 | 32.93 | |
| Rejected ballots | | 18 | 0.55 | |
| Conservative hold | | Swing | | |

=== Lye and Stourbridge North ===
Lye and Stourbridge North
| Party | Candidate | Votes | % | ±% |
|---|---|---|---|---|
| Labour | Pete Lowe* | 1,334 | 45.01 | +10.5 |
| Conservative | Lisa Clinton | 1,066 | 35.96 | −8.3 |
| Libertarian | Gary Farmer | 280 | 9.45 | +1.0 |
| Liberal Democrats | Abdul Qadus | 274 | 9.24 | +1.9 |
| Majority | | 268 | 9.1 | |
| Turnout | | 2,964 | 32.38 | |
| Rejected ballots | | 10 | 0.34 | |
| Labour hold | | Swing | | |

=== Netherton, Woodside and St Andrew's ===
Netherton, Woodside and St Andrew's
| Party | Candidate | Votes | % | ±% |
|---|---|---|---|---|
| Labour | Elaine Taylor* | 1,556 | 61.07 | +18.7 |
| Conservative | Lynette Corfield | 971 | 38.11 | −10.0 |
| Majority | | 585 | 23.1 | |
| Turnout | | 2,548 | 25.23 | |
| Rejected ballots | | 21 | 0.82 | |
| Labour hold | | Swing | | |

=== Norton ===
Norton
| Party | Candidate | Votes | % | ±% |
|---|---|---|---|---|
| Conservative | Tony Creed | 1,953 | 53.16 | −9.1 |
| Labour | Ellen Cobb | 1,157 | 31.49 | +12.2 |
| Liberal Democrats | David Sheppard | 312 | 8.49 | +1.7 |
| Green | Andi Mohr | 227 | 6.18 | −2.7 |
| Majority | | 796 | 21.8 | |
| Turnout | | 3,674 | 38.74 | |
| Rejected ballots | | 25 | 0.68 | |
| Conservative gain from Independent | | Swing | | |

The incumbent councillor, Colin Elcock, was elected for the Conservative Party but was expelled in November 2020.

=== Pedmore and Stourbridge East ===
Pedmore and Stourbridge East
| Party | Candidate | Votes | % | ±% |
|---|---|---|---|---|
| Conservative | Angus Lees* | 1,953 | 54.49 | −7.9 |
| Labour | Jason Griffin | 1,132 | 31.58 | +7.4 |
| Liberal Democrats | Simon Hanson | 386 | 10.77 | +6.6 |
| Libertarian | Glen Wilson | 86 | 2.40 | −0.7 |
| Majority | | 821 | 23.1 | |
| Turnout | | 3,584 | 37.36 | |
| Rejected ballots | | 27 | 0.75 | |
| Conservative hold | | Swing | | |

=== Quarry Bank and Dudley Wood ===
Quarry Bank and Dudley Wood
| Party | Candidate | Votes | % | ±% |
|---|---|---|---|---|
| Labour | Chris Barnett* | 1,165 | 51.48 | +16.9 |
| Conservative | Claire Sullivan | 892 | 39.42 | −18.8 |
| Liberal Democrats | Richard Priest | 190 | 8.40 | +5.6 |
| Majority | | 273 | 12.1 | |
| Turnout | | 2,263 | 22.52 | |
| Rejected ballots | | 16 | 0.48 | |
| Labour hold | | Swing | | |

=== Sedgley ===
Sedgley
| Party | Candidate | Votes | % | ±% |
|---|---|---|---|---|
| Conservative | Shaun Keasey* | 1,979 | 64.53 | −8.5 |
| Labour | Freya Ashworth | 967 | 31.53 | +9.2 |
| Libertarian | Martin Day | 98 | 3.20 | −0.6 |
| Majority | | 1,012 | 33.2 | |
| Turnout | | 3,067 | 32.58 | |
| Rejected ballots | | 23 | 0.87 | |
| Conservative hold | | Swing | | |

=== St James's ===
St James's
| Party | Candidate | Votes | % | ±% |
|---|---|---|---|---|
| Conservative | Sara Bothul | 1,218 | 46.17 | −7.4 |
| Labour | Khurshid Ahmed* | 1,211 | 45.91 | +6.5 |
| Liberal Democrats | Allie Miller | 196 | 7.43 | +1.0 |
| Majority | | 7 | 0.3 | |
| Turnout | | 2,638 | 26.36 | |
| Rejected ballots | | 13 | 0.32 | |
| Conservative gain from Labour | | Swing | | |

=== St Thomas's ===
St Thomas's
| Party | Candidate | Votes | % | ±% |
|---|---|---|---|---|
| Labour | Maz Qari | 1,637 | 49.34 | −1.7 |
| Conservative | Sajid Hanif | 1,441 | 43.43 | +2.4 |
| TUSC | Nicola Fisher | 224 | 6.75 | +3.5 |
| Majority | | 196 | 5.9 | |
| Turnout | | 3,318 | 31.95 | |
| Rejected ballots | | 16 | 0.48 | |
| Labour hold | | Swing | | |

=== Upper Gornal and Woodsetton ===
Upper Gornal and Woodsetton
| Party | Candidate | Votes | % | ±% |
|---|---|---|---|---|
| Labour Co-op | Adrian Hughes | 1,368 | 51.72 | +6.7 |
| Conservative | Chris Neale* | 1,254 | 47.41 | −0.7 |
| Majority | | 114 | 4.3 | |
| Turnout | | 2,645 | 26.94 | |
| Rejected ballots | | 23 | 0.87 | |
| Labour gain from Conservative | | Swing | | |

=== Wollaston and Stourbridge Town ===
Wollaston and Stourbridge Town
| Party | Candidate | Votes | % | ±% |
|---|---|---|---|---|
| Labour | Cat Eccles | 1,983 | 48.93 | +11.4 |
| Conservative | Nicolas Barlow* | 1,654 | 40.81 | −7.9 |
| Liberal Democrats | Christopher Bramall | 276 | 6.81 | +3.1 |
| Freedom Alliance | Ken Moore | 88 | 2.17 | N/A |
| Libertarian | Max Lowe | 39 | 0.96 | −3.5 |
| Majority | | 329 | 8.1 | |
| Turnout | | 4,053 | 40.24 | |
| Rejected ballots | | 13 | 0.32 | |
| Labour gain from Conservative | | Swing | | |

=== Wordsley ===
Wordsley
| Party | Candidate | Votes | % | ±% |
|---|---|---|---|---|
| Conservative | Donna Harley* | 1,578 | 54.81 | −17.4 |
| Labour | Keith Archer | 1,068 | 37.10 | +20.3 |
| Liberal Democrats | Elaine Sheppard | 219 | 7.61 | +2.4 |
| Majority | | 510 | 17.8 | |
| Turnout | | 2,879 | 29.71 | |
| Rejected ballots | | 14 | 0.49 | |
| Conservative hold | | Swing | | |

== Changes 2022–2023 ==
- Late 2022: Gornal councillor Anne Millward was suspended by the Conservative group after criticising council leader Patrick Harley's decision to withdraw Dudley from the Black Country Plan (announced October 2022), and sat as an independent councillor for 21 days before being reinstated.
