= 2015 Dudley Metropolitan Borough Council election =

2015 local election in England

← 2014	7 May 2015	2016 →

24 out of 72 seats for Dudley Metropolitan Borough Council 37 seats needed for a majority

	First party	Second party	Third party
Leader	Pete Lowe	Patrick Harley	Unknown
Party	Labour	Conservative	UKIP
Seats before	41	25	7
Seats won	11	13	0
Seats after	40	26	7
Seat change	▼1	▲1	Steady
Popular vote	52,046	58,026	35,727
Percentage	33.74%	37.62%	23.16%
	Fourth party
Leader	Will Duckworth
Party	Green
Seats before	1
Seats won	0
Seats after	1
Seat change	Steady
Popular vote	6,608
Percentage	4.28%
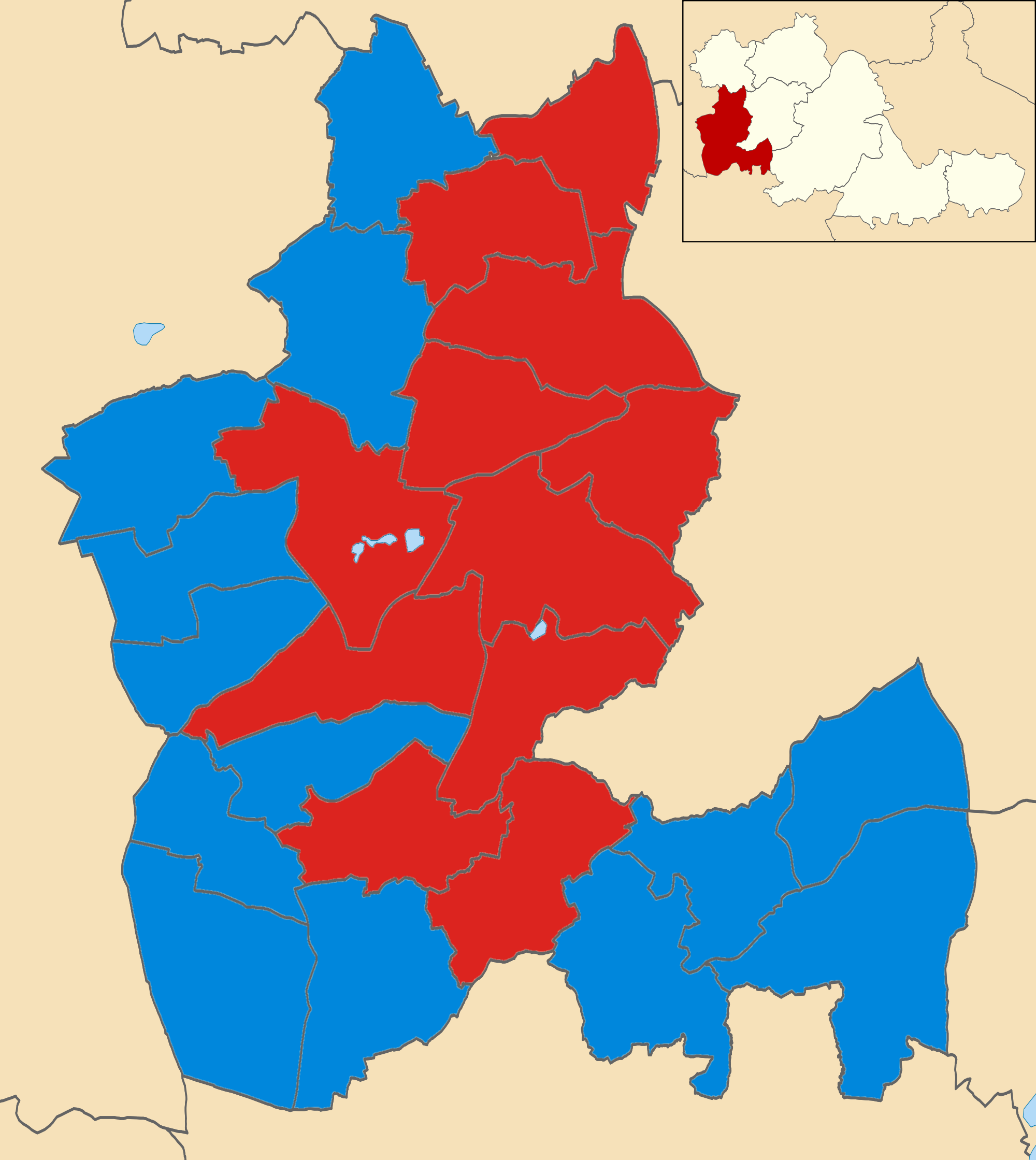
Council control before election
Labour
Council control after election
Labour

The 2015 Dudley Metropolitan Borough Council election took place on 7 May 2015 to elect members of the Dudley Metropolitan Borough Council in England. It was held on the same day as other local elections, as well as the election of MPs for Dudley South, Dudley North, Halesowen and Rowley Regis and Stourbridge.

== Results summary ==
2015 Dudley Metropolitan Borough Council
Party	Candidates						Votes		
Party	Stood	Elected	Gained	Unseated	Net	% of total	%	No.	Net %
Conservative	24	13	1	0	▲1	54.17	37.62	58,026	
Labour	24	11	0	1	▼1	45.83	33.74	52,046	
UKIP	24	0	0	0	Steady	0.00	23.16	35,727	
Green	24	0	0	0	Steady	0.00	4.28	6,608	
Liberal Democrats	4	0	0	0	Steady	0.00	0.96	1,485	
Independent	1	0	0	0	Steady	0.00	0.24	366	
Totals	101	24				100.00	100.00	154,258	

== Ward results ==
* - Incumbent Candidate

=== Amblecote ===
Amblecote Ward
Party	Candidate	Votes	%
Conservative	Simon James Tyler	3,079	44.95
UKIP	Pete Lee	1,776	25.93
Labour	Sikandar Ahmed	1,716	25.05
Green	Christian Devi Kiever	238	3.47
Rejected ballots		41	0.60
Conservative hold			

=== Belle Vale ===
Belle Vale Ward
Party	Candidate	Votes	%
Conservative	Simon Phipps	2,728	39.42
Labour	Liz Keenan	2,533	36.60
UKIP	Graema Anthony Jack Lloyd	1,279	18.48
Green	Gemma Louise Thompson	329	4.75
Rejected ballots		51	0.74
Conservative hold			

=== Brierley Hill ===
Brierley Hill Ward
Party	Candidate	Votes	%
Labour	Rachel Naomi Harris*	2,351	42.89
Conservative	Kamran Razzaq	1,429	26.07
UKIP	Carl James Owen	1,409	25.70
Green	Gordon Christopher Elcock	275	5.02
Rejected ballots		18	0.33
Labour hold			

=== Brockmoor & Pensnett ===
Brockmoor & Pensnett Ward
Party	Candidate	Votes	%
Labour	Karen Mary Jordan*	2,069	39.93
Conservative	Sue Greenaway	1,593	30.74
UKIP	Jennifer Louise Bernadette Hill	1,374	26.51
Green	Ben Sweeney	127	2.45
Rejected ballots		19	0.37
Labour hold			

=== Castle & Priory ===
Castle & Priory Ward
Party	Candidate	Votes	%
Labour	Ken Finch*	3,011	47.00
UKIP	Philip Ather Wimlett	1,695	26.46
Conservative	Daryl Brian Millward	1,481	23.12
Green	Alexander John Kendall	202	3.15
Rejected ballots		18	0.28
Labour hold			

=== Coseley East ===
Coseley East Ward
Party	Candidate	Votes	%
Labour	Melvyn Mottram	2,276	41.14
UKIP	Craig Peter Winyard	1,684	30.44
Conservative	Martin Richard Duffield	1,399	25.28
Green	Jon Hartless	159	2.87
Rejected ballots		15	0.27
Labour hold			

=== Cradley & Wollescote ===
Cradley & Wollescote Ward
Party	Candidate	Votes	%
Labour	Richard John Body	2,602	43.54
Conservative	Alan Harry Hopwood	1,704	28.51
UKIP	Lee John Sargeant	1,427	23.88
Green	Dennis Anthony Neville	218	3.65
Rejected ballots		25	0.42
Labour hold			

=== Gornal ===
Gornal Ward
Party	Candidate	Votes	%
Conservative	Anne Elizabeth Millward	2,443	34.45
Labour	Stuart Turner*	2,292	32.32
UKIP	Andrew John Elton Parsons	2,203	31.07
Green	Ryan James Virgo	124	1.75
Rejected ballots		29	0.41
Conservative gain from Labour			

=== Halesowen North ===
Halesowen North
Party	Candidate	Votes	%
Conservative	Karen Elizabeth Shakespeare*	2,497	39.04
Labour	Ian McGarry	2,337	36.54
UKIP	Nathan Paul Hunt	1,288	20.14
Green	Jogn Payne	231	3.61
Rejected ballots		43	0.67
Conservative hold			

=== Halesowen South ===
Halesowen South
Party	Candidate	Votes	%
Conservative	Alan Taylor*	3,633	50.77
Labour	John Lewis	1,815	25.36
UKIP	James Alexander Apperley	1,148	16.04
Liberal Democrats	Derek Alan Campbell	293	4.09
Green	Tim Weller	219	3.06
Rejected ballots		48	0.67
Conservative hold			

=== Hayley Green & Cradley South ===
Hayley Green & Cradley South Ward
Party	Candidate	Votes	%
Conservative	Jeff Hill	2,879	43.61
Labour	Malcolm David Freeman	1,840	27.87
UKIP	Michael William Forsyth	1,222	18.51
Independent	Adrian John Turner	366	5.54
Green	Colin Royle	242	3.67
Rejected ballots		52	0.79
Conservative hold			

=== Kingswinford North & Wall Heath ===
Kingswinford North & Wall Heath Ward
Party	Candidate	Votes	%
Conservative	Nicola Faye Richards	3,672	49.65
Labour	Lynn Edwina Boleyn	1,944	26.28
UKIP	Karl Sean Reynolds	1,553	21.00
Green	Luke Stuart Harrison	196	2.65
Rejected ballots		31	0.42
Conservative hold			

=== Kingswinford South ===
Kingswinford South Ward
Party	Candidate	Votes	%
Conservative	Peter Philip Miller	3,828	53.00
Labour	Shaz Saleem	1,678	23.23
UKIP	Peter Charles Hillman	1,356	18.78
Green	Vicky Duckworth	326	4.51
Rejected ballots		34	0.47
Conservative hold			

=== Lye & Stourbridge ===
Lye & Stourbridge North Ward
Party	Candidate	Votes	%
Labour	Mohammed Hanif*	2,143	35.89
Conservative	Asan Mishaq	1,937	32.44
UKIP	Wendy Wilde	1,646	27.57
Green	Andi Mohr	218	3.65
Rejected ballots		27	0.45
Labour hold			

=== Netherton, Woodside & St. Andrews's ===
Netherton, Woodside & St. Andrews's Wars
Party	Candidate	Votes	%
Labour	Qadar Zada*	2,113	34.63
UKIP	Stephen Daniels	1,474	24.16
Green	Bill McCornish	1,288	21.11
Conservative	Chris Neale	1,201	19.69
Rejected ballots		25	0.41
Labour hold			

=== Norton Ward ===
Norton Ward
Party	Candidate	Votes	%
Conservative	Heather Rogers*	3,795	52.62
Labour	Mike Crannage	1,527	21.17
UKIP	David Jolyan Stroud Powell	1,023	14.18
Liberal Democrats	Vic Hanson	429	5.95
Green	Pam Archer	414	5.74
Rejected ballots		34	0.33
Conservative hold			

=== Pedmore & Stourbridge East ===
Pedmore & Stourbridge East
Party	Candidate	Votes	%
Conservative	Ian Marshall Kettle*	3,862	53.51
Labour	Julie Elizabeth Baines	1,673	23.18
UKIP	David Jolyan Stroud Powell	1,023	14.34
Liberal Democrats	Simon Paul Hanson	357	4.95
Green	Liz Tilly	254	3.52
Rejected ballots		35	0.51
Conservative hold			

=== Quarry Bank & Dudley Wood ===
Quarry Bank & Dudley Wood Ward
Party	Candidate	Votes	%
Labour	Jackie Cowell*	2,072	35.95
UKIP	Dean Horton	1,750	30.37
Conservative	Sue Ridney	1,660	28.80
Green	Martin Richard Cotterell	259	4.49
Rejected ballots		22	0.38
Labour hold			

=== Sedgley ===
Sedgley Ward
Party	Candidate	Votes	%
Conservative	Tina Marion Westwood	2,914	42.89
UKIP	Marcia Vera Harris	1,874	27.58
Labour	Sue Ridney	1,779	26.18
Green	Emma Caroline Harrison	193	2.84
Rejected ballots		34	0.50
Conservative hold			

=== St. James ===
St. James's Ward
Party	Candidate	Votes	%
Labour	Mary Roberts*	2,641	44.74
UKIP	Philip Andrew Rowe	1,642	27.82
Conservative	Jack Anthony Spriggs	1,398	23.68
Green	Adrian Denis Crossen	186	3.15
Rejected ballots		38	0.61
Labour hold			

=== St. Thomas's ===
St. Thomas's Ward
Party	Candidate	Votes	%
Labour	Glenis Louise Simms	3,351	57.07
UKIP	Helen Louise Wimlett	1,310	22.31
Conservative	Lila Redfern	918	15.63
Green	Christian Green	258	4.39
Rejected ballots		35	0.60
Labour hold			

=== Upper Gornal & Woodsetton ===
Upper Gornal & Woodsetton Ward
Party	Candidate	Votes	%
Labour	Adam Michael Aston*	2,256	37.03
Conservative	Doreen Ameson	1,864	30.59
UKIP	Fiona Jane Evans	1,795	29.46
Green	Daniel James Brookes	154	2.53
Rejected ballots		24	0.39
Labour hold			

=== Wollaston & Stourbridge Town ===
Wollaston & Stourbridge Town Ward
Party	Candidate	Votes	%
Conservative	Steve Clark	3,075	43.40
Labour	Serena Craigle	1,956	27.61
UKIP	Maxim Lowe	1,141	16.1
Green	Lawrence Rowlett	461	6.51
Liberal Democrats	Margaret Hanson	406	5.73
Rejected ballots		46	0.65
Conservative hold			

=== Wordsley ===
Wordsley Ward
Party	Candidate	Votes	%
Conservative	Matt Rogers	3,037	43.93
Labour	William Peter Cody	2,071	29.96
UKIP	John Alexander Christian MacLeod	1,623	23.48
Green	Catherine Mary Maguire	161	2.33
Rejected ballots		21	0.30
Conservative hold			
