= Cat Eccles =

English politician

Cat Eccles MP
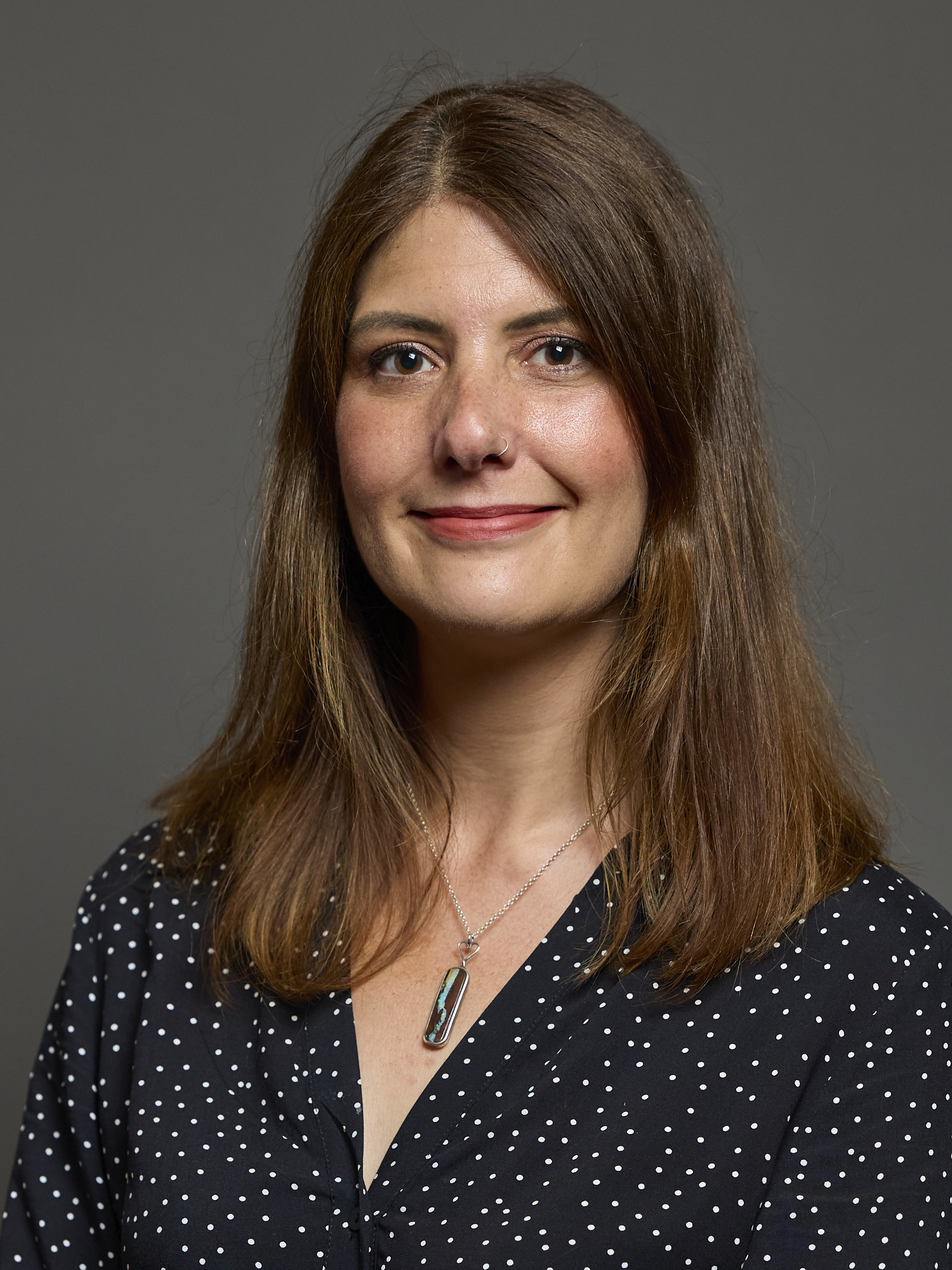
- Official portrait, 2024

Member of Parliament for Stourbridge
- Incumbent
- Assumed office 4 July 2024
- Preceded by: Suzanne Webb
- Majority: 3,073 (7.7%)

Personal details
- Born: Catherine Eccles Stourbridge, England
- Party: Labour

Catherine Eccles is a British Labour Party politician who has served as the Member of Parliament for Stourbridge since 2024, and a councillor in Dudley from 2022 until 2026.

She has previously worked in hospital operating theatres as a senior operating department practitioner (ODP).

== Early political career ==
Eccles has been a local councillor for the Wollaston and Stourbridge Town ward, on Dudley Metropolitan Borough Council, since the 2022 Dudley Metropolitan Borough Council election.

She is a member of Unison, Unite the Union and the National Trust, and is a trustee of Wollaston Village Hall.

== Parliamentary career ==
Eccles was selected as a prospective parliamentary candidate for the Labour Party in the constituency of Stourbridge, a then safe seat for the Conservative Party, in December 2023.

She is the chair of the APPG on Visual Arts and Artists.

Parliament of the United Kingdom
Preceded by Suzanne Webb	Member of Parliament for Stourbridge; 2024–present	Incumbent
