= 1998 Dudley Metropolitan Borough Council election =

1998 UK local government election

Elections to Dudley Metropolitan Borough Council were held on 7 May 1998. One third of the council was up for election and the Labour party kept overall control of the council.

After the election, the composition of the council was

- Labour 58
- Liberal Democrat 7
- Conservative 7

== Election result ==
Dudley local election result 1998
| Party | Seats | Gains | Losses | Net gain/loss | Seats % | Votes % | Votes | +/− |
|---|---|---|---|---|---|---|---|---|
| Labour | 17 | | | -2 | 70.8 | | | |
| Liberal Democrats | 4 | | | +3 | 16.7 | | | |
| Conservative | 3 | | | -1 | 12.5 | | | |
