= 2011 Dudley Metropolitan Borough Council election =

2011 UK local government election

- 5 May 2011

24 out of 72 seats to Dudley Metropolitan Borough Council 37 seats needed for a majority

	First party	Second party
Party	Conservative	Labour
Last election	44 seats, 61.1%	26 seats, 36.1%
Seats before	44	26
Seats won	12	12
Seats after	43	28
Seat change	▼1	▲2
Popular vote	37,173	37,395
Percentage	40.1%	40.4%
Swing	▲0.4%	▲6.5%
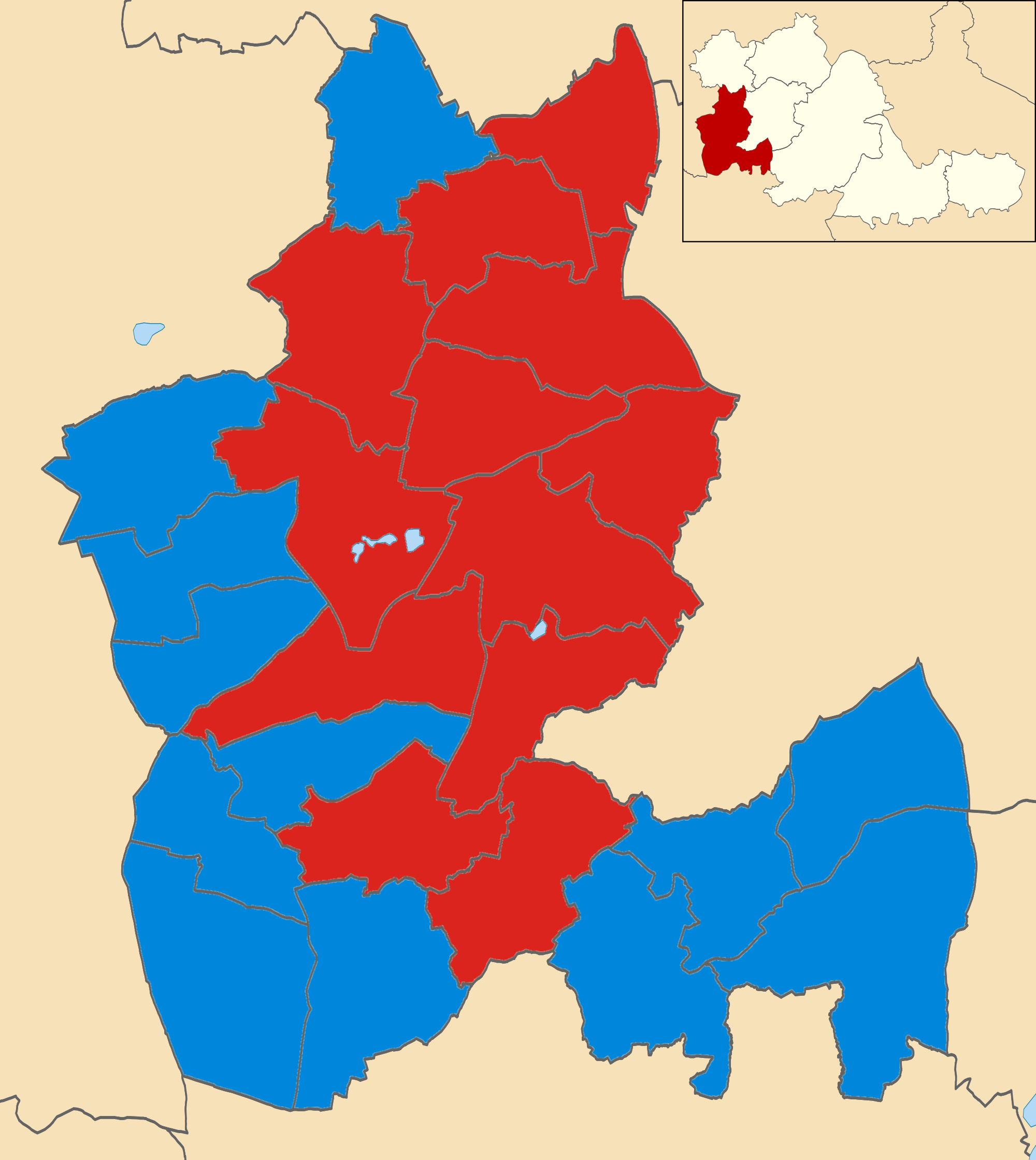
- Winner of each seat at the 2011 Dudley Metropolitan Borough Council election
Council control before election
Conservative
Council control after election
Conservative

The 2011 Dudley Metropolitan Borough Council election was held on 5 May 2011 to elect members of Dudley Metropolitan Borough Council in the West Midlands, England, as part of the 2011 United Kingdom local elections. 24 seats were up for election, and the results saw the Conservatives hold on to a slightly reduced majority of 15.

== Election results ==
Dudley local election result 2011
Party	Seats	Gains	Losses	Net gain/loss	Seats %	Votes %	Votes	+/−
Labour	12	2	0	▲2	50.0	40.4	37,395	▲6.5
Conservative	12	1	2	▼1	50.0	40.1	37,173	▲0.4
UKIP	0	0	0	Steady	0.0	8.5	7,879	▼1.8
Liberal Democrats	0	0	1	▼1	0.0	5.9	5,481	▼7.3
Green	0	0	0	Steady	0.0	4.1	3,837	▲3.1
BNP	0	0	0	Steady	0.0	0.4	364	▼0.9
National Front	0	0	0	Steady	0.0	0.3	308	▼0.1
Independent	0	0	0	Steady	0.0	0.2	205	Steady

== Results by ward ==
Amblecote
Party	Candidate	Votes	%	±%
Conservative	Pat Martin	1,681	45.0	
Labour	John Martin	1,364	36.5	
UKIP	Pete Lee	446	11.9	
Liberal Democrats	Vera Johnson	227	6.1	
Majority		338	12.8	
Turnout		3,734	35.9	
Conservative hold		Swing		

Belle Vale
Party	Candidate	Votes	%	±%
Conservative	Bob James	1,931	47.7	
Labour	Donella Russell	1,688	41.7	
Green	Dennis Neville	403	9.96	
Majority		243		
Turnout		4,048	39.7	
Conservative hold		Swing		

Brierley Hill
Party	Candidate	Votes	%	±%
Labour	Rachel Harris	1,503	50.0	
Conservative	Dan Horrocks	742	24.7	
UKIP	Annmarie May	273	9.1	
BNP	Simon Foxall	185	6.2	
Liberal Democrats	Linda Beasley	160	5.3	
Green	Gordon Elcock	131	4.4	
Majority		338	12.8	
Turnout		3,734	35.9	
Labour hold		Swing		

Brockmoor & Pensnett
Party	Candidate	Votes	%	±%
Labour	Karen Jordan	1,474	54.8	
Conservative	Sue Ridley	708	26.3	
UKIP	Andy May	312	11.6	
Liberal Democrats	David Lavender	108	4.0	
Green	Vicky Duckworth	80	3.0	
Majority		766		
Turnout		2,690	27.7	
Labour hold		Swing		

Castle & Priory
Party	Candidate	Votes	%	±%
Labour	Ken Finch	2,099	59.7	
Conservative	Hasan Afzal	731	20.8	
UKIP	Sue Rowe	661	18.8	
Majority		1,368		
Turnout		3,514	32.9	
Labour hold		Swing		

Coseley East
Party	Candidate	Votes	%	±%
Labour	Melvyn Mottram	1,705	52.0	
Conservative	Martin Duffield	742	29.1	
UKIP	Peter Hillman	592	18.1	
Majority		751		
Turnout		3,277	34.1	
Labour hold		Swing		

Cradley & Wollescote
Party	Candidate	Votes	%	±%
Labour	Richard Body	2,106	57.5	
Conservative	Louis Redding	865	23.6	
UKIP	Glen Wilson	289	7.9	
BNP	Robert Weale	179	4.9	
Green	John Payne	109	3.0	
Liberal Democrats	Margaret Hanson	106	2.9	
Majority		1,241		
Turnout		3,663	37.0	
Labour hold		Swing		

Gornal
Party	Candidate	Votes	%	±%
Labour	Stuart Turner	1,620	37.9	
Conservative	Anne Millward	1,618	37.8	
UKIP	Phil Rowe	701	16.4	
National Front	Ken Griffiths	171	4	
Liberal Democrats	Michael Jones	100	2.34	
Green	Daniel Archer	53	1.24	
Majority		2		
Turnout		4,280	40.8	
Labour gain from Conservative		Swing		

Halesowen North
Party	Candidate	Votes	%	±%
Conservative	Karen Shakespeare	2,078	51.6	
Labour	Hilary Bills	1,906	47.3	
Majority		172		
Turnout		3,216	42.1	
Conservative hold		Swing		

Halesowen South
Party	Candidate	Votes	%	±%
Conservative	Alan Taylor	2,538	55.3	
Labour	Ian Copper	1,372	29.9	
UKIP	Ray Franklin	394	8.6	
Green	Tim Weller	264	5.8	
Majority		1,166		
Turnout		4,590	46.1	
Conservative hold		Swing		

Hayley Green & Cradley South
Party	Candidate	Votes	%	±%
Conservative	Ken Turner	2,128	53.0	
Labour	Mike Kelly	1,258	31.3	
UKIP	Bob Heeley	414	10.3	
Green	Christopher Lees	204	5.1	
Majority		870		
Turnout		4,014	43.0	
Conservative hold		Swing		

Kingswinford North & Wall Heath
Party	Candidate	Votes	%	±%
Conservative	Cheryl Billingham	1,895	40.5	
Liberal Democrats	David Tyler	1,599	34.1	
Labour	Christine Perks	814	17.4	
UKIP	Dave Timmins	272	5.8	
Green	Liz Jednorog	93	2.0	
Majority		296		
Turnout		4,685	46.0	
Conservative gain from Liberal Democrats		Swing		

Kingswinford South
Party	Candidate	Votes	%	±%
Conservative	Peter Miller	2,303	53.4	
Labour	Stephen Haycock	1,238	28.7	
UKIP	Janet Wimlett	446	10.3	
Liberal Democrats	Lois Bramall	304	7.0	
Majority		1,065		
Turnout		4,317	41.7	
Conservative hold		Swing		

Lye & Stourbridge
Party	Candidate	Votes	%	±%
Labour	Hanif Mohammed	1,747	49.0	
Conservative	Sharon Tinsley	1,250	35.0	
Liberal Democrats	Susan Lucas	317	8.9	
Independent	Abdul Qadus	205	5.8	
Majority		497		
Turnout		3,567	37.1	
Labour hold		Swing		

Netherton, Woodside & St. Andrews's
Party	Candidate	Votes	%	±%
Labour	Qadar Zada	1,551	40.6	
Green	Will Duckworth	1,068	28.0	
Conservative	Steve Ridley	716	18.8	
UKIP	Phil Wimlett	387	10.1	
Liberal Democrats	John White	76	2.0	
Majority		483		
Turnout		3,816	35.9	
Labour hold		Swing		

Norton
Party	Candidate	Votes	%	±%
Conservative	Heather Rogers	2,550	55.0	
Labour	Su Lowe	1,048	22.6	
Liberal Democrats	Christopher Bramall	688	14.8	
Green	Benjamin Sweeney	336	7.2	
Majority		1,502		
Turnout		4,640	48.0	
Conservative hold		Swing		

Pedmore & Stourbridge
Party	Candidate	Votes	%	±%
Conservative	Ian Kettle	2,833	58.2	
Labour	Ada Tomkinson	1,330	27.3	
Liberal Democrats	Simon Hanson	367	7.6	
Green	Lawrence Rowlett	316	6.5	
Majority		1,503		
Turnout		4,864	48.8	
Labour hold		Swing		

Quarry Bank & Dudley Wood
Party	Candidate	Votes	%	±%
Labour	Jackie Cowell	1,621	48.7	
Conservative	Mike Wood	1,059	31.8	
UKIP	Helen Wimlett	412	12.4	
Green	Pam Archer	121	3.6	
Liberal Democrats	David Sheppard	101	3.04	
Majority		562		
Turnout		3,327	32.4	
Labour hold		Swing		

Sedgley
Party	Candidate	Votes	%	±%
Conservative	David Caunt	1,998	49.2	
Labour Co-op	Barbara Sykes	1,029	25.3	
UKIP	Bill Etheridge	711	17.5	
Liberal Democrats	Serena Craigie	171	4.2	
National Front	Keven Inman	1317	3.4	
Majority		969		
Turnout		4,062	41.6	
Conservative hold		Swing		

St. James's
Party	Candidate	Votes	%	±%
Labour	Mary Roberts	1,755	52.8	
Conservative	Ian Jones	794	23.9	
UKIP	Tim Byrne	554	16.7	
Liberal Democrats	Mandy Adams	204	6.1	
Majority		961		
Turnout		3,326	33.0	
Labour hold		Swing		

St. Thomas's
Party	Candidate	Votes	%	±%
Labour	Arshad Safeena	2,360	63.3	
UKIP	Mick Forsyth	621	16.7	
Conservative	Daryl Millward	599	16.1	
Green	Christian Green	125	3.4	
Majority		1,739		
Turnout		3,727	36.3	
Labour hold		Swing		

Upper Gornal & Woodsetton
Party	Candidate	Votes	%	±%
Labour	Adam Aston	1,811	51.1	
Conservative	David Simms	1,681	47.4	
Majority		130		
Turnout		3,545	34.3	
Labour gain from Conservative		Swing		

Wollaston & Stourbridge Town
Party	Candidate	Votes	%	±%
Conservative	Margaret Cowell	1,772	38.5	
Labour	Chris Hale	1,500	32.6	
Liberal Democrats	June Collins	656	14.3	
UKIP	Barbara Deeley	394	8.6	
Green	Catherine Maguire	264	5.7	
Majority		272		
Turnout		4,601	45.3	
Conservative hold		Swing		

Wordsley
Party	Candidate	Votes	%	±%
Conservative	Glenis Simms	1,749	45.7	
Labour	Lynda Coulter	1,496	39.1	
Liberal Democrats	Lynn Boleyn	297	7.76	
Green	Maurice Archer	270	7.1	
Majority		253		
Turnout		3,827	37.9	
Conservative hold		Swing		
