= 2010 Dudley Metropolitan Borough Council election =

Local election in West Midlands, England

- 1 May 2010

24 out of 72 seats to Dudley Metropolitan Borough Council 37 seats needed for a majority

	First party	Second party
Party	Conservative	Labour
Last election	43 seats, 59.7%	26 seats, 36.1%
Seats before	43	26
Seats won	14	10
Seats after	44	26
Seat change	▲1	Steady
Popular vote	61,701	52,581
Percentage	39.7%	33.9%
Swing	▼2.8%	▲2.0%
- Winner of each seat at the 2010 Dudley Metropolitan Borough Council election
Council control before election
Conservative
Council control after election
Conservative

The 2010 Dudley Metropolitan Borough Council Election was held on 6 May 2010 to elect 24 councillors (1 third of total). This election was held on the same day as other local elections.

== Election results ==
Dudley Local Election Result 2010
Party	Seats	Gains	Losses	Net gain/loss	Seats %	Votes %	Votes	+/−
Conservative	14	1	0	▲1	58.3	39.7	61,701	▼2.8
Labour	10	0	0	Steady	41.7	33.9	52,581	▲2.0
Liberal Democrats	0	0	1	▼1	0.0	13.2	20,509	▼1.8
UKIP	0	0	0	Steady	0.0	10.3	15,969	▲6.5
BNP	0	0	0	Steady	0.0	1.3	2,084	▼4.7
Green	0	0	0	Steady	0.0	1.0	1,603	▲0.7
National Front	0	0	0	Steady	0.0	0.4	566	new
Independent	0	0	0	Steady	0.0	0.2	292	new

== Results by Ward ==
An asterisk indicates an incumbent councillor.

=== Amblecote ===
Amblecote
Party	Candidate	Votes	%	±%
Conservative	Liz Walker*	2,936	43.3	▼6.5
Labour	Steve Sharples	1,957	28.9	▼3.0
Liberal Democrats	Vera Johnson	180	16.2	▼2.1
UKIP	Pete Lee	180	10.1	new
Green	Bill McComish	262	1.5	new
Majority		979	14.4	▼0.7
Turnout		6,779	65.7	+36.2
Conservative hold		Swing	▼1.75	

=== Belle Vale ===
Belle Vale
Party	Candidate	Votes	%	±%
Conservative	Jill Nicholls*	2,904	43.5	▼11.1
Labour	Andy Matthews	2,789	41.8	▲9.9
UKIP	Bill Roberts	982	14.7	new
Majority		115	1.7	▼19.8
Turnout		6,675	66.9	+31.4
Conservative hold		Swing	▼10.5	

=== Brierley Hill ===
Brierley Hill
Party	Candidate	Votes	%	±%
Labour	Zafar Islam*	1,898	36.0	▼8.0
Conservative	Steve Ridley	1,525	27.6	▼4.7
Liberal Democrats	Linda Beasley	868	15.7	▼7.9
UKIP	Andrew May	547	9.9	new
BNP	Jason Percival	477	8.6	new
Green	Gordon Elcock	116	2.1	new
Majority		373	6.8	▼2.1
Turnout		5,522	55.4	+28.2
Labour hold		Swing	▼1.65	

=== Brockmoor and Pensnett ===
Brockmoor and Pensnett
Party	Candidate	Votes	%	±%
Labour	Judy Foster*	2,247	43.1	▼1.2
Conservative	Sue Ridley	1,594	30.6	▼0.8
UKIP	Jeffery May	654	12.5	▼0.9
Liberal Democrats	Lois Brammall	632	12.1	▲1.2
Green	Vicky Duckworth	86	1.6	new
Majority		653	12.5	▼0.4
Turnout		5,213	53.8	+27.2
Labour hold		Swing	▼0.2	

=== Castle and Priory ===
Castle and Priory
Party	Candidate	Votes	%	±%
Labour	Alan Finch*	2,762	44.1	▲4.6
Conservative	Glenis Simms	1,858	29.6	▲12.3
UKIP	Bob Dudley	941	15.0	▲4.6
Liberal Democrats	Leighton Bruce	708	11.3	▲2.8
Majority		904	14.4	▼0.7
Turnout		6,269	59.8	+23.9
Labour hold		Swing	▼3.85	

=== Coseley East ===
Coseley East
Party	Candidate	Votes	%	±%
Labour	Sue Ridney*	2,055	36.4	▲1.8
Conservative	Star Etheridge	1,590	28.1	▲4.8
BNP	Kenneth Griffiths	784	13.9	▼20.2
Liberal Democrats	Stephanie Kerrigan	640	11.3	▲3.3
UKIP	Pete Hillman	581	10.3	new
Majority		465	8.2	▲7.6
Turnout		5,650	59.1	+20.9
Labour hold		Swing	▼1.5	

=== Cradley and Foxcote ===
Cradley and Foxcote
Party	Candidate	Votes	%	±%
Labour	Timothy Crumpton*	2,629	42.8	▼11.5
Conservative	Matt Rogers	1,677	27.3	▼18.4
Liberal Democrats	Andrew McKay	824	13.4	new
BNP	Robert Weale	488	8.0	new
UKIP	Barry Rose	428	7.0	new
Green	Christian Green	91	1.5	new
Majority		952	15.5	▲6.9
Turnout		6,137	62.3	+29.4
Labour hold		Swing	▲3.45	

=== Gornal ===
Gornal
Party	Candidate	Votes	%	±%
Conservative	Tim Wright*	2,815	39.3	▲5.8
Labour	Stuart Turner	2,164	30.2	▲4.6
UKIP	Philip Rowe	1,164	16.3	▲6.0
Liberal Democrats	Michael Jones	680	9.5	▲4.2
National Front	Kevin Inman	332	4.6	new
Majority		651	9.1	▼1.2
Turnout		7,155	68.2	+24.3
Conservative hold		Swing	▲0.6	

=== Halesowen North ===
Haleswen North
Party	Candidate	Votes	%	±%
Conservative	Jeff Hill*	2,785	43.4	▼4.6
Labour	Hilary Bills	2,705	42.2	▲11.4
UKIP	Stuart Henley	921	14.4	new
Majority		80	1.2	▼16.0
Turnout		6,411	68.0	+27.7
Conservative hold		Swing	▼8.0	

=== Halesowen South ===
Haleswen South
Party	Candidate	Votes	%	±%
Conservative	John Woodall*	4,593	64.5	▼8.6
Labour	Toni Kenning	2,528	35.5	▲8.6
Majority		2065	29.0	▼17.1
Turnout		7,121	73.2	+31.9
Conservative hold		Swing	▼8.6	

=== Hayley Green and Cradley South ===
Hayley Green and Cradley South
Party	Candidate	Votes	%	±%
Conservative	Ray Burston*	3,859	60.1	▼6.9
Labour	Michael Kelly	2,560	39.9	▲6.9
Majority		1,299	20.2	▼13.7
Turnout		6,419	70.0	+32.4
Conservative hold		Swing	▼6.9	

=== Kingswinford North and Wall Heath ===
Kingswinford North and Wall Heath
Party	Candidate	Votes	%	±%
Conservative	Paul Woodall	2,972	40.4	▼1.6
Liberal Democrats	Lynn Boleyn*	2,873	39.1	▼4.3
Labour	Khalil Yousaf	887	12.1	▼2.5
UKIP	David Timmins	622	8.5	New
Majority		99	1.3	▼0.1
Turnout		7,354	72.5	+30.2
Conservative gain from Liberal Democrats		Swing	▲1.4	

=== Kingswinford South ===
Kingswinford South
Party	Candidate	Votes	%	±%
Conservative	Patrick Harley*	3,295	45.4	▼1.8
Labour	Stephen Haycock	1675	23.1	▲2.9
Liberal Democrats	Janet Hendry	1,341	18.5	▼15.1
UKIP	Glen Wilson	599	9.8	New
BNP	Simon Foxall	335	4.6	New
Green	Elizabeth Jednorog	80	1.1	New
Majority		1620	22.1	▲8.5
Turnout		7,325	70.0	+30.0
Conservative hold		Swing	▼2.35	

=== Lye and Wollescote ===
Lye and Wollescote
Party	Candidate	Votes	%	±%
Labour	Pete Lowe*	2,377	39.0	▼5.9
Conservative	Andrew Moore	1,883	30.9	▼12.1
Liberal Democrats	Susan Lucas	846	13.9	▲1.8
UKIP	Glen Wilson	599	9.8	new
Independent	Abdul Qadus	292	4.8	new
Green	Catherine Maguire	95	1.6	New
Majority		494	8.1	▲6.2
Turnout		6,092	64.0	+32.2
Labour hold		Swing	▲3.1	

=== Netherton, Woodside and St Andrews ===
Netherton, Woodside and St Andrews
Party	Candidate	Votes	%	±%
Labour	Tracy Wood	2,473	41.8	▲1.7
Conservative	Tracy Blunt	1,778	30.0	▼13.0
UKIP	Michael Forsyth	813	13.7	▼2.3
Liberal Democrats	Barbara White	689	11.6	▼1.5
Green	Will Duckworth	168	2.8	New
Majority		695	11.7	▲2.4
Turnout		5,921	56.1	+27.9
Labour hold		Swing	▼5.3	

=== Norton ===
Norton
Party	Candidate	Votes	%	±%
Conservative	Angus Adams*	3,784	52.4	▲2.3
Liberal Democrats	Margaret Hanson	1,736	24.1	▼12.6
Labour	Jackie Cowell	1,430	19.8	▲6.6
Green	Benjamin Sweeney	268	3.7	New
Majority		2,048	28.4	▲15.1
Turnout		7,218	75	+30.0
Conservative hold		Swing	▲7.5	

=== Pedmore and Stourbridge East ===
Pedmore and Stourbridge East
Party	Candidate	Votes	%	±%
Conservative	Colin Wilson*	3,881	52.2	▼9.2
Labour	Jackie Cowell	1,694	22.8	0
Liberal Democrats	Simon Hanson	1,199	16.1	▲0.3
UKIP	Lynette Wragg	511	2.0	new
Green	John Payne	149	3.7	new
Majority		2,187	29.4	▼9.2
Turnout		7,434	75	+41.8
Conservative hold		Swing	▼4.6	

=== Quarry Bank and Dudley Wood ===
Quarry Bank and Dudley Wood
Party	Candidate	Votes	%	±%
Labour	David Sparks*	2,557	42.3	▼6.1
Conservative	Mike Wood	1,942	32.1	▼3.0
Liberal Democrats	David Sheppard	787	13.0	▼3.5
UKIP	Helen Wimlett	670	11.1	new
Green	Lawrence Rowlett	91	1.5	new
Majority		615	10.2	▼3.0
Turnout		6,047	59.6	+31.4
Labour hold		Swing	▼1.5	

=== St James's ===
St James's
Party	Candidate	Votes	%	±%
Labour	Khurshid Ahmed*	2,030	34.4	▲8.8
Conservative	Ian Jones	1,725	29.3	▲12.5
UKIP	Roger Scott-Dow	1,285	21.8	▲9.6
Liberal Democrats	John White	853	14.5	▼9.7
Majority		305	5.2	▲3.7
Turnout		5,893	59.4	+23.4
Labour hold		Swing	▼3.7	

=== St Thomas's ===
St Thomas's
Party	Candidate	Votes	%	±%
Labour	Steve Waltho*	2,897	49.1	▲2.9
Conservative	Bill Etheridge	1,188	20.1	▲3.5
UKIP	Phil Wimlett	1,163	19.7	▼4.5
Liberal Democrats	Giovanna Faulkner	657	11.1	▼2.9
Majority		1709	28.9	▲6.9
Turnout		5,905	58.4	+23.8
Labour hold		Swing	▼0.3	

=== Sedgley ===
Sedgley
Party	Candidate	Votes	%	±%
Conservative	Tina Westwood	3,430	50.8	▼19.4
Labour	Keiran Casey	2,202	32.6	▲2.7
UKIP	Paul Byrne	891	13.2	new
National Front	Ade Woodhouse	234	3.5	new
Majority		1228	18.2	▼22.1
Turnout		6,757	69.8	+35.0
Conservative hold		Swing	▼11.1	

=== Upper Gornal and Woodsetton ===
Upper Gornal and Woodsetton
Party	Candidate	Votes	%	±%
Conservative	Doreen Amerson*	2,471	39.1	▲6.1
Labour	Adam Aston	2,221	35.2	▲3.4
UKIP	Martyn Wright	997	15.8	▲8.2
Liberal Democrats	Inderjit Paul	624	9.9	new
Majority		250	4.0	▲2.8
Turnout		6,313	61.6	+23.3
Conservative hold		Swing	▲1.4	

=== Wollaston & Stourbridge Town ===
Wollaston & Stourbridge Town
Party	Candidate	Votes	%	±%
Conservative	Malcom Knowles*	2,545	35.9	▼4.7
Liberal Democrats	June Collins	2,138	30.1	▼4.3
Labour	Cristopher Hale	1,778	25.1	▼0.1
UKIP	Simon Davis	412	5.8	new
Green	Pam Archer	223	3.1	new
Majority		407	5.7	▼0.4
Turnout		7,096	70.2	+29.5
Conservative hold		Swing	▼0.2	

=== Wordsley ===
Wordsley
Party	Candidate	Votes	%	±%
Conservative	John Jones	2,671	40.1	▼3.4
Labour	Margaret Bowkley	1,975	29.7	▼8.5
Liberal Democrats	Wendy Baggot	1,319	19.8	▲1.4
UKIP	Daniel Cronin	563	8.5	new
Green	Jamie Dainton	131	2.0	new
Majority		696	10.5	▲5.2
Turnout		6,659	67.6	+32.6
Conservative hold		Swing	▲2.6	
