= 2008 Dudley Metropolitan Borough Council election =

2008 UK local government election

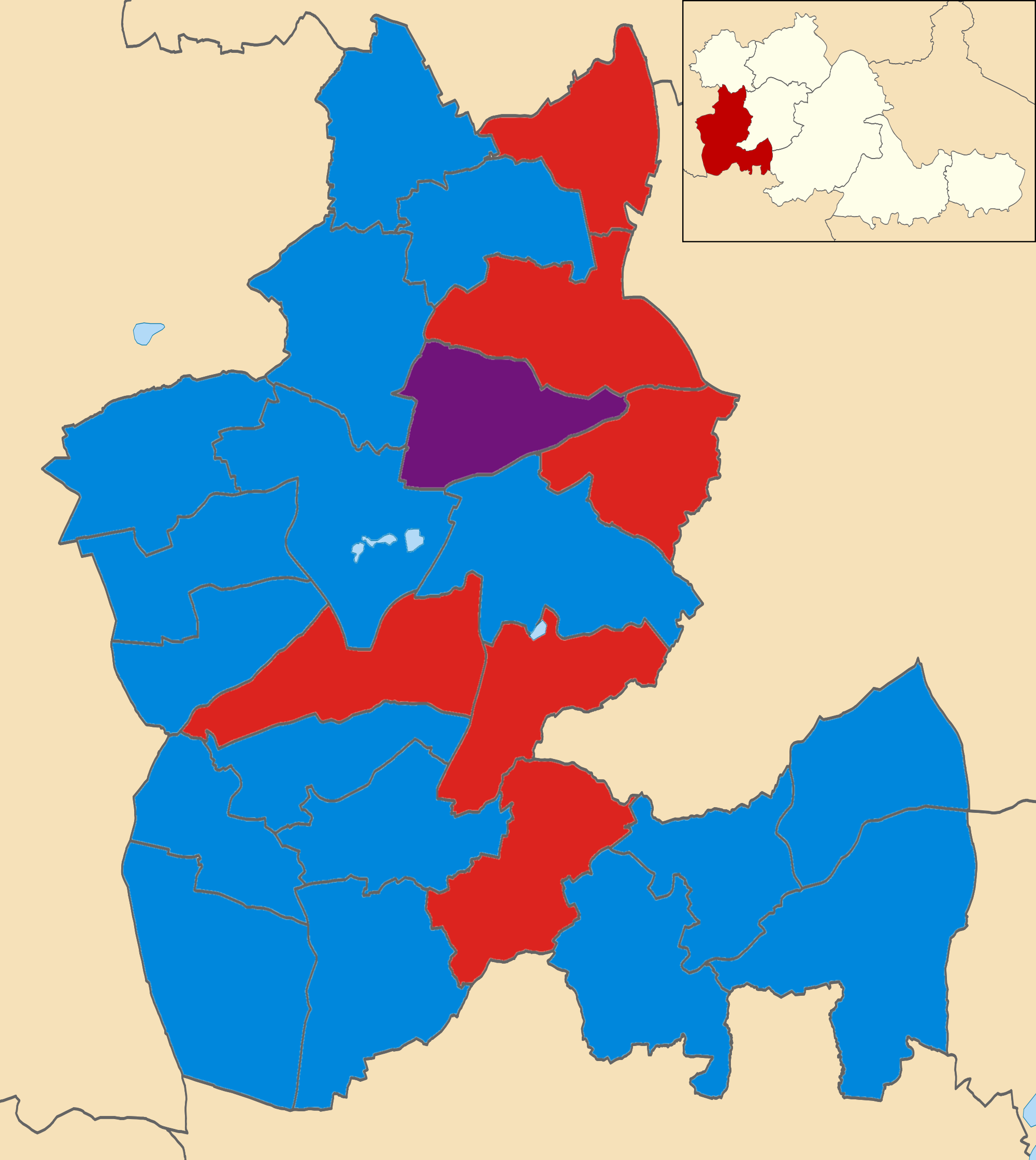
2008 local election results in Dudley

Elections to Dudley Metropolitan Borough Council were held on 1 May 2008. One third of the council was up for election, with an additional seat in Sedgley ward following the resignation of a councillor.

Following the election the Conservative Party held 43 seats, the Labour Party held 26 seats, the Liberal Democrats held 2 seats, and the UK Independence Party held one seat.

== Ward results ==
=== Amblecote ward ===
Amblecote ward
Party	Candidate	Votes	%	±%
Conservative	Colin Banks	1,517	50.82	
Labour	Stephen Sharples	680	22.78	
UKIP	Michael Forsyth	530	17.76	
Liberal Democrats	Harold Hanson	249	8.34	
Majority		837	28.04	
Turnout		2,985	29.50	

=== Belle Vale ward ===
Belle Vale ward
Party	Candidate	Votes	%	±%
Conservative	Jennifer Dunn	1,793	53.47	
Labour	Hilary Bills	1,037	30.93	
UKIP	Jane Franklin	498	14.85	
Majority		756	22.55	
Turnout		3,353	34.24	

=== Brierley Hill ward ===
Brierley Hill ward
Party	Candidate	Votes	%	±%
Labour	Margaret Wilson	963	36.52	
Conservative	Steven Ridley	736	27.91	
UKIP	Paul Southall	694	26.32	
Liberal Democrats	John Dyer	241	9.14	
Majority		227	8.61	
Turnout		2,637	26.32	

=== Brockmoor & Pensnett ward ===
Brockmoor & Pensnett ward
Party	Candidate	Votes	%	±%
Conservative	Susan Greenaway	846	31.91	
Labour	Qadar Zada	777	29.31	
BNP	Stephen Tracey	508	19.16	
Independent	Julian Mitchell	313	11.81	
Liberal Democrats	Janice Porter	204	7.70	
Majority		69	2.60	
Turnout		2,651	27.11	

=== Castle & Priory ward ===
Castle & Priory ward
Party	Candidate	Votes	%	±%
Labour	Margaret Aston	1,089	35.24	
UKIP	Garry Butler	257	8.32	
Conservative	Daryl Millward	997	32.27	
BNP	Diane Sankey	495	16.02	
Liberal Democrats	Lorna Simpson	249	8.06	
Majority		92	2.97	
Turnout		3,090	29.24	

=== Coseley East ward ===
Coseley East ward
Party	Candidate	Votes	%	±%
Labour	George Davies	1,245	35.9	
BNP	Kenneth Griffiths	935	26.96	
Conservative	Stephen Lounds	1,026	29.58	
Liberal Democrats	Claire O'Kane	252	7.27	
Majority		219	6.32	
Turnout		3,468	36.05	

=== Cradley & Foxcote ward ===
Cradley & Foxcote ward
Party	Candidate	Votes	%	±%
Labour	Gaye Partridge	1,187	37.78	
UKIP	Barry Rose	679	21.61	
Conservative	Glenis Simms	1,025	32.62	
Independent	Safeanah Yasmin	236	7.51	
Majority		162	5.13	
Turnout		3,142	32	

=== Gornal ward ===
Gornal ward
Party	Candidate	Votes	%	±%
Liberal Democrats	Michael Jones	154	3.5	
BNP	Vicki Peace	513	11.65	
UKIP	Philip Rowe	1,125	25.56	
Conservative	David Stanley	1,776	40.35	
Labour	Stuart Turner	830	18.86	
Majority		651	14.79	
Turnout		4,402	41.8	

=== Halesowen North ward ===
Halesowen North ward
Party	Candidate	Votes	%	±%
Conservative	Lesley Faulkner	1,755	50.68	
BNP	Tony Gill	351	10.14	
UKIP	Stuart Henley	550	15.88	
Labour	Richard Lloyd	790	22.81	
Majority		965	27.87	
Turnout		3,463	36.22	

=== Halesowen South ward ===
Halesowen South ward
Party	Candidate	Votes	%	±%
UKIP	Raymond Franklin	264	6.73	
Labour	Andrew Matthews	734	18.71	
BNP	Peter Morris	342	8.72	
Conservative	David Vickers	2,567	65.45	
Majority		1,833	46.74	
Turnout		3,922	39.78	

=== Hayley Green & Cradley South ward ===
Hayley Green & Cradley South ward
Party	Candidate	Votes	%	±%
UKIP	Caroline Dredge	497	14.19	
Labour	Michael Kelly	797	22.76	
Conservative	Hazel Turner	2,189	62.51	
Majority		1,392	39.75	
Turnout		3,502	37.35	

=== Kingswinford North & Wall Heath ward ===
Kingswinford North & Wall Heath ward
Party	Candidate	Votes	%	±%
Labour	William Cody	429	9.61	
UKIP	Martin Gallagher	402	9.01	
Conservative	Denise Harley	2,003	44.89	
Liberal Democrats	David Lavender	1610	36.08	
Majority		393	8.81	
Turnout		4,462	43.29	

=== Kingswinford South ward ===
Kingswinford South ward
Party	Candidate	Votes	%	±%
Conservative	David Blood	1,879	47.1	
Labour	Stephen Haycock	573	14.36	
Liberal Democrats	Brian Nicholls	866	21.71	
UKIP	Michael Partridge	659	16.52	
Majority		1,013	25.39	
Turnout		3,989	38.29	

=== Lye & Wollescote ward ===
Lye & Wollescote ward
Party	Candidate	Votes	%	±%
UKIP	Barbara Deeley	663	19.55	
Labour	Christopher Hale	1,010	29.78	
Independent	Abdul Qadus	435	12.83	
Conservative	Adrian Turner	1,274	37.57	
Majority		264	7.79	
Turnout		3,391	35.42	

=== Netherton, Woodside & St. Andrew's ward ===
Netherton, Woodside & St. Andrew's ward
Party	Candidate	Votes	%	±%
Conservative	John Davies	1,074	35.8	
Liberal Democrats	Tina Kalsi	246	8.2	
UKIP	Amanda Mobberley	623	20.77	
Labour	Mahbubur Rahman	1,044	34.8	
Majority		30	1	
Turnout		3,000	28.43	

=== Norton ward ===
Norton ward
Party	Candidate	Votes	%	±%
Conservative	Arthur Attwood	2,445	59.91	
Labour	Jacqueline Cowell	603	14.78	
BNP	Andrew Griffiths	285	6.98	
UKIP	Peter Lee	210	5.15	
Liberal Democrats	Andrew McKay	530	12.99	
Majority		1,842	45.13	
Turnout		4,081	42.35	

=== Pedmore & Stourbridge East ward ===
Pedmore & Stourbridge East ward
Party	Candidate	Votes	%	±%
Labour	Graham Debney	667	15.98	
Liberal Democrats	Simon Hanson	432	10.35	
Conservative	Leslie Jones	2,444	58.55	
UKIP	Lynette Wragg	616	14.76	
Majority		1,777	42.57	
Turnout		4,174	41.7	

=== Quarry Bank & Dudley Wood ward ===
Quarry Bank & Dudley Wood ward
Party	Candidate	Votes	%	±%
Labour	Bryan Cotterill	1,376	42.16	
BNP	Julian Griffiths	437	13.39	
Liberal Democrats	John White	136	4.17	
UKIP	Helen Wimlett	192	5.88	
Conservative	Michael Wood	1,119	34.28	
Majority		257	7.88	
Turnout		3,264	32.17	

=== Sedgley ward ===
Sedgley ward (2 candidates)
Party	Candidate	Votes	%	±%
UKIP	Robert Dudley	784	12.2	
Conservative	Michael Evans	2,318	36.08	
Labour	Parshottam Gupta	573	8.92	
UKIP	Dennis Partridge	522	8.13	
Conservative	Geoffrey Perry	1,676	26.09	
Labour	Cicely Ann	540	8.41	
Majority		1,534 and 892	23.88 and 13.89	
Turnout		6,424	37.24	

=== St. James's ward ===
St. James's ward
Party	Candidate	Votes	%	±%
Liberal Democrats	Serena Craigie	631	18.12	
UKIP	Peter Malcolm Davis	994	28.54	
Labour	Geoffrey Edge	776	22.28	
BNP	Heather Inman	311	8.93	
Conservative	Ian Jones	625	17.94	
Independent	Gurwinder Singh	142	4.08	
Majority		218	6.26	
Turnout		3,483	35.16	

=== St. Thomas's ward ===
St. Thomas's ward
Party	Candidate	Votes	%	±%
Labour	Shaukat Ali	1,587	46.01	
Independent	Tony Barnsley	135	3.91	
Liberal Democrats	Giovanna Faulkner	161	4.67	
Conservative	Louis Redding	555	16.09	
UKIP	Philip Wimlett	1,006	29.17	
Majority		581	16.84	
Turnout		3,449	34.22	

=== Upper Gornal & Woodsetton ward ===
Upper Gornal & Woodsetton ward
Party	Candidate	Votes	%	±%
Labour	Adam Aston	1,092	30.88	
BNP	Kevin Inman	870	24.6	
Conservative	Julian Ryder	1,574	44.51	
Majority		482	13.63	
Turnout		3,536	34.54	

=== Wollaston & Stourbridge Town ward ===
Wollaston & Stourbridge Town ward
Party	Candidate	Votes	%	±%
Conservative	Nicolas Barlow	1,505	38.75	
Liberal Democrats	June Collins	1,268	32.65	
UKIP	Simon Davis	326	8.39	
Labour	Tracy Wood	775	19.95	
Majority		237	6.1	
Turnout		3,884	38.23	

=== Wordsley ward ===
Wordsley ward
Party	Candidate	Votes	%	±%
Labour	Margaret Bowkley	743	22.87	
Liberal Democrats	Lois Celestine	288	8.86	
UKIP	Andrew Partridge	549	16.9	
Conservative	Geoffrey Southall	1,660	51.09	
Majority		917	28.22	
Turnout		3,249	33.25	
