= 2006 Dudley Metropolitan Borough Council election =

← 2004	4 May 2006	2007 →

24 of the 72 seats on Dudley Metropolitan Borough Council 37 seats needed for a majority
	First party	Second party	Third party
Party	Conservative	Labour	Liberal Democrats
Seats won	13	10	1
Seats after	40	26	5
Seat change	Steady	▲1	▼1
Popular vote	36,366	27,269	12,851
Percentage	42.5%	31.9%	15.0%
Swing	▲1.7%	▲1.4%	▼7.4%
- Map of the 2006 Dudley council election. Labour in red, Conservatives in blue and Liberal Democrats in yellow.
Council control before election
Conservative
Council control after election
Conservative

Elections to Dudley Metropolitan Borough Council were held on 4 May 2006. One third of the council was up for election and the Conservatives retained control of the council, while Labour gained one seat and the Liberal Democrats lost one seat.

== Election result ==
Dudley local election result 2006
Party	Seats	Gains	Losses	Net gain/loss	Seats %	Votes %	Votes	+/−
Conservative	13	1	1	Steady	54.2	42.5	36,366	▲1.7
Labour	10	2	1	▲1	41.7	31.9	27,269	▲1.4
Liberal Democrats	1	0	1	▼1	4.2	15.0	12,851	▼7.4
BNP	0	0	0	Steady	0.0	6.0	5,116	▲1.0
UKIP	0	0	0	Steady	0.0	3.8	3,224	New
Respect	0	0	0	Steady	0.0	0.5	420	Steady
Green	0	0	0	Steady	0.0	0.3	241	New

== Ward results ==
=== Amblecote ===
Amblecote
Party	Candidate	Votes	%	±%
Conservative	Liz Walker	1,482	49.8	
Labour	John Martin	951	31.9	
Liberal Democrats	Margaret Hanson	544	18.3	
Majority		531	17.9	
Turnout			30.0	
Conservative hold		Swing		

=== Belle Vale ===
Belle Vale
Party	Candidate	Votes	%	±%
Conservative	Jill Nicholls	1,872	54.6	
Labour	Paul Cornick	1,135	33.1	
Respect	Richard Alonzo	420	12.3	
Majority		737	21.5	
Turnout			35.5	
Conservative hold		Swing		

=== Brierley Hill ===
Brierley Hill
Party	Candidate	Votes	%	±%
Labour	Zafar Islam	1,146	44.0	
Conservative	Kerry Bradley	841	32.3	
Liberal Democrats	John Dyer	615	23.6	
Majority		305	11.7	
Turnout			27.2	
Labour hold		Swing		

=== Brockmoor and Pensnett ===
Brockmoor and Pensnett
Party	Candidate	Votes	%	±%
Labour	Judy Foster	1,141	44.3	
Conservative	John Davies	808	31.4	
UKIP	Amanda Mobberley	344	13.4	
Liberal Democrats	Lois Bramall	281	10.9	
Majority		333	12.9	
Turnout			26.6	
Labour hold		Swing		

=== Castle and Priory ===
Castle and Priory
Party	Candidate	Votes	%	±%
Labour	Alan Finch	1,442	39.5	
BNP	Julian Mitchell	890	24.4	
Conservative	Daryl Millward	632	17.3	
UKIP	Philip Rowe	381	10.4	
Liberal Democrats	Kieran Smith	309	8.5	
Majority		552	15.1	
Turnout			35.9	
Labour hold		Swing		

=== Coseley East ===
Coseley East
Party	Candidate	Votes	%	±%
Labour	Susan Ridney	1,258	34.6	
BNP	Kenneth Griffiths	1,238	34.1	
Conservative	Clive Murray	845	23.3	
Liberal Democrats	Claire O'Kane	292	8.0	
Majority		20	0.5	
Turnout			38.2	
Labour hold		Swing		

=== Cradley and Foxcote ===
Cradley and Foxcote
Party	Candidate	Votes	%	±%
Labour	Timothy Crumpton	1,699	54.3	
Conservative	John Perry	1,429	45.7	
Majority		270	8.6	
Turnout			32.9	
Labour hold		Swing		

=== Gornal ===
Gornal
Party	Candidate	Votes	%	±%
Conservative	Timothy Wright	1,546	33.5	
Labour	Jeffrey Jewkes	1,183	25.6	
BNP	Timothy Alden	1,170	25.3	
UKIP	Robert Dudley	477	10.3	
Liberal Democrats	Michael Jones	243	5.3	
Majority		363	7.9	
Turnout			43.9	
Conservative hold		Swing		

=== Halesowen North ===
Halesowen North
Party	Candidate	Votes	%	±%
Conservative	Jeff Hill	1,818	48.0	
Labour	Parmjit Singh Sahota	1,167	30.8	
Liberal Democrats	Andrew McKay	559	14.8	
Green	Aldo Mussi	241	6.4	
Majority		651	17.2	
Turnout			40.3	
Conservative hold		Swing		

=== Halesowen South ===
Halesowen South
Party	Candidate	Votes	%	±%
Conservative	John Woodall	2,940	73.1	
Labour	Martin Knight	1,084	26.9	
Majority		1,856	46.2	
Turnout			41.3	
Conservative hold		Swing		

=== Hayley Green and Cradley South ===
Hayley Green and Cradley South
Party	Candidate	Votes	%	±%
Conservative	Antony Burston	2,318	67.0	
Labour	Michael Kelly	1,143	33.0	
Majority		1,175	34.0	
Turnout			37.6	
Conservative hold		Swing		

=== Kingswinford North and Wall Heath ===
Kingswinford North and Wall Heath
Party	Candidate	Votes	%	±%
Liberal Democrats	Lynn Boleyn	1,874	43.4	
Conservative	Terence Billingham	1,813	42.0	
Labour	Madeleine Cowley	631	14.6	
Majority		61	1.4	
Turnout			42.3	
Liberal Democrats hold		Swing		

=== Kingswinford South ===
Kingswinford South
Party	Candidate	Votes	%	±%
Conservative	Patrick Harley	1,940	47.2	
Liberal Democrats	Jon Bramall	1,380	33.6	
Labour	Stephen Haycock	789	19.2	
Majority		560	13.6	
Turnout			40.0	
Conservative hold		Swing		

=== Lye and Wollescote ===
Lye and Wollescote
Party	Candidate	Votes	%	±%
Labour	Peter Lowe	1,337	44.9	
Conservative	David Vickers	1,280	43.0	
Liberal Democrats	Mohammed Arif	359	12.1	
Majority		57	1.9	
Turnout			31.8	
Labour gain from Conservative		Swing		

=== Netherton, Woodside and St Andrews ===
Netherton, Woodside and St Andrews
Party	Candidate	Votes	%	±%
Labour	Lynda Coulter	1,185	40.1	
Conservative	Richard Gwinnett	910	30.8	
UKIP	James Mobberley	474	16.0	
Liberal Democrats	Derise Williams	387	13.1	
Majority		275	9.3	
Turnout			28.5	
Labour hold		Swing		

=== Norton ===
Norton
Party	Candidate	Votes	%	±%
Conservative	Angus Adams	2,159	50.1	
Liberal Democrats	David Sheppard	1,583	36.7	
Labour	David Jeffries	570	13.2	
Majority		576	13.4	
Turnout			45.0	
Conservative hold		Swing		

=== Pedmore and Stourbridge East ===
Pedmore and Stourbridge East
Party	Candidate	Votes	%	±%
Conservative	Colin Wilson	2,639	61.4	
Labour	Tracy Wood	980	22.8	
Liberal Democrats	Simon Hanson	678	15.8	
Majority		1,659	38.6	
Turnout			43.2	
Conservative hold		Swing		

=== Quarry Bank and Dudley Wood ===
Quarry Bank and Dudley Wood
Party	Candidate	Votes	%	±%
Labour	David Sparks	1,319	48.4	
Conservative	Phillip Moore	958	35.1	
Liberal Democrats	John White	450	16.5	
Majority		361	13.3	
Turnout			28.2	
Labour hold		Swing		

=== St James's ===
St James's
Party	Candidate	Votes	%	±%
Labour	Khurshid Ahmed	895	25.6	
Liberal Democrats	Ribirtha Hart	844	24.2	
BNP	Dean Major	743	21.3	
Conservative	Glenis Simms	586	16.8	
UKIP	Carol Pearce	426	12.2	
Majority		51	1.4	
Turnout			36.4	
Labour gain from Liberal Democrats		Swing		

=== St Thomas's ===
St Thomas's
Party	Candidate	Votes	%	±%
Labour	Steve Waltho	1,574	46.2	
UKIP	Phillip Wimlett	824	24.2	
Conservative	Alan Gallis	567	16.6	
Liberal Democrats	Giovanna Faulkner	444	13.0	
Majority		750	22.0	
Turnout			34.6	
Labour hold		Swing		

=== Sedgley ===
Sedgley
Party	Candidate	Votes	%	±%
Conservative	Charles Fraser-Macnamara	2,596	70.1	
Labour	Adam Aston	1,105	29.9	
Majority		1,491	40.2	
Turnout			34.8	
Conservative hold		Swing		

=== Upper Gornal and Woodsetton ===
Upper Gornal and Woodsetton
Party	Candidate	Votes	%	±%
Conservative	Doreen Ameson	1,285	33.0	
Labour	Kenneth Finch	1,239	31.8	
BNP	Kevin Inman	1,075	27.6	
UKIP	Jason Pearce	298	7.6	
Majority		46	1.2	
Turnout			38.3	
Conservative hold		Swing		

=== Wollaston and Stourbridge Town ===
Wollaston and Stourbridge Town
Party	Candidate	Votes	%	±%
Conservative	Malcolm Knowles	1,642	40.6	
Liberal Democrats	Timothy Hubbard	1,392	34.4	
Labour	Tina While-Cooper	1,014	25.0	
Majority		250	6.2	
Turnout			40.7	
Conservative hold		Swing		

=== Wordsley ===
Wordsley
Party	Candidate	Votes	%	±%
Conservative	Harold Nottingham	1,460	43.5	
Labour	Graham Debney	1,282	38.2	
Liberal Democrats	Barbara White	617	18.4	
Majority		178	5.3	
Turnout			35.0	
Conservative gain from Labour		Swing		
