= 2019 Dudley Metropolitan Borough Council election =

2019 UK local government election

- 6 May 2019

24 out of 72 seats to Dudley Metropolitan Borough Council 37 seats needed for a majority

	First party	Second party
Leader	Patrick Harley	Qadar Zada
Party	Conservative	Labour
Last election	35 seats, 48.6%	36 seats, 50%
Seats before	12	11
Seats won	13	11
Seats after	36	36
Seat change	▲1	Steady
Popular vote	27,496	22,731
Percentage	39.9%	33.0%
Swing	▼8.3%	▼6.1%
- Winner of each seat at the 2019 Dudley Metropolitan Borough Council election
Council control before election
Conservative
Council control after election
Conservative

The 2019 Dudley Metropolitan Borough Council election took place on 2 May 2019 to elect members of Dudley Metropolitan Borough Council in England. This was on the same day as other local elections.

== Results summary ==
2019 Dudley Metropolitan Borough Council election
Party	This election				Full council			This election		
Party	Candidates	Seats	Net	Seats %	Other	Total	Total %	Votes	Votes %	+/−
Conservative	{{{candidates}}}	13	▲1	54.2	23	36	50.0	27,496	39.9	
Labour	{{{candidates}}}	11	Steady	45.8	25	36	50.0	22,731	33.0	
UKIP	{{{candidates}}}	0	Steady	0.0	0	0	0.0	7,110	10.3	
Black Country Party	{{{candidates}}}	0	Steady	0.0	0	0	0.0	5,465	7.9	
Green	{{{candidates}}}	0	Steady	0.0	0	0	0.0	2,918	4.2	
Liberal Democrats	{{{candidates}}}	0	Steady	0.0	0	0	0.0	2,308	3.4	
Independent	{{{candidates}}}	0	▼1	0.0	0	0	0.0	787	1.1	
Libertarian	{{{candidates}}}	0	Steady	0.0	0	0	0.0	47	0.1	

== Ward results ==
=== Amblecote ===
Amblecote
Party	Candidate	Votes	%	±%
Conservative	Pete Lee	1,119	41.8	
Labour	Ellen Cobb	781	29.2	
UKIP	Terry Thorn	597	22.3	
Liberal Democrats	Ian Flynn	165	6.2	
Majority		338		
Turnout			26.1	
Conservative hold		Swing		

=== Belle Vale ===
Belle Vale
Party	Candidate	Votes	%	±%
Conservative	Simon Phipps	1,829	53.0	
Labour	Donella Russell	1,049	30.4	
Black Country Party	William Stephenson	367	10.6	
Green	Bill McComish	190	5.5	
Majority		780		
Turnout			33.6	
Conservative hold		Swing		

=== Brierley Hill ===
Brierley Hill
Party	Candidate	Votes	%	±%
Labour	Ridha Ahmed	850	36.8	
Conservative	Adam Davies	825	35.7	
UKIP	Delesh Patel	389	16.8	
Green	Gordon Elcock	233	10.1	
Majority		25		
Turnout			21.8	
Labour hold		Swing		

=== Brockmoor & Pensnett ===
Brockmoor & Pensnett
Party	Candidate	Votes	%	±%
Conservative	Sue Greenaway	747	33.7	
Labour	Carolanne Lello	712	32.1	
UKIP	Rich Colley	414	18.7	
Black Country Party	Garry Sawers	341	15.4	
Majority		35		
Turnout			22.3	
Conservative gain from Labour		Swing		

=== Castle & Priory ===
Castle & Priory
Party	Candidate	Votes	%	±%
Labour	Ken Finch	1,125	44.9	
UKIP	David Donnelly	586	23.4	
Conservative	Richard Tasker	567	22.6	
Green	Maurice Archer	174	6.9	
Libertarian	Martin Day	47	1.9	
Majority		539		
Turnout			22.1	
Labour hold		Swing		

=== Coseley East ===
Coseley East
Party	Candidate	Votes	%	±%
Labour	Peter Drake	1,039	43.4	
UKIP	Phil Robinson	779	32.5	
Conservative	Josef Baker	549	22.9	
Majority		260		
Turnout			25.5	
Labour hold		Swing		

=== Cradley & Wollescote ===
Cradley & Wollescote
Party	Candidate	Votes	%	±%
Labour	Richard Body	1,180	41.2	
Conservative	James Clinton	849	29.7	
UKIP	Euan Dunn	440	15.4	
Black Country Party	Mitch Bolton	251	8.8	
Liberal Democrats	Ryan Priest	128	4.5	
Majority		331		
Turnout			29.2	
Labour hold		Swing		

=== Gornal ===
Gornal
Party	Candidate	Votes	%	±%
Conservative	Anne Millward	1,505	47.9	
UKIP	Matt Jones	934	29.7	
Labour	Karl Denning	662	21.1	
Majority		571		
Turnout			30.1	
Conservative hold		Swing		

=== Halesowen North ===
Halesowen North
Party	Candidate	Votes	%	±%
Labour	Parmjit Sahota	1,292	36.6	
Conservative	Peter Dobb	1,155	32.8	
Black Country Party	Stuart Henley	805	22.8	
UKIP	Gabby Coverson	261	7.4	
Majority		137		
Turnout			37.1	
Labour gain from Conservative		Swing		

=== Halesowen South ===
Halesowen South
Party	Candidate	Votes	%	±%
Conservative	Alan Taylor	1,695	51.4	
Labour	Helen Betts-Patel	720	21.8	
Black Country Party	Nicholas Gregory	512	15.5	
Liberal Democrats	Derek Campbell	212	6.4	
Independent	Tim Weller	140	4.2	
Majority		975		
Turnout			33.9	
Conservative hold		Swing		

=== Hayley Green & Cradley South ===
Hayley Green & Cradley South
Party	Candidate	Votes	%	±%
Conservative	Ian Bevan	1,416	48.9	
Labour	Gwyneth Stewart	705	24.4	
Black Country Party	Dean Ford	455	15.7	
Green	John Payne	301	10.4	
Majority		711		
Turnout			31.7	
Conservative hold		Swing		

=== Kingswinford North & Wall ===
Kingswinford North & Wall
Party	Candidate	Votes	%	±%
Conservative	Nicola Richards	1,975	63.5	
Labour	Jack Downes	565	18.2	
Green	Pam Archer	286	9.2	
Liberal Democrats	Jonathan Bramall	207	6.7	
Majority		1,410		
Turnout			31.1	
Conservative hold		Swing		

=== Kingswinford South ===
Kingswinford South
Party	Candidate	Votes	%	±%
Conservative	Peter Miller	1,823	61.9	
Labour	Marian Howard	523	17.8	
Green	Taryn Bradley	346	11.8	
Liberal Democrats	Elizabeth Greeves	194	6.6	
Majority		1,300		
Turnout			28.9	
Conservative hold		Swing		

=== Lye & Stourbridge North ===
Lye & Stourbridge North
Party	Candidate	Votes	%	±%
Labour	Mohammed Hanif	1,355	48.0	
Conservative	Kamran Razzaq	596	21.1	
Black Country Party	Gary Farmer	595	21.1	
Green	Lawrence Rowlett	161	5.7	
Liberal Democrats	Alan Lewers	104	3.7	
Majority		759		
Turnout			30.2	
Labour hold		Swing		

=== Netherton, Woodside & St. Andrew's ===
Netherton, Woodside & St. Andrew's
Party	Candidate	Votes	%	±%
Labour	Qadar Zada	1,243	46.3	
Conservative	Phil Atkins	456	17.0	
Black Country Party	Mark Robinson	378	14.1	
UKIP	Caley Ashman	369	13.8	
Green	Alex Wright	165	6.2	
Liberal Democrats	Alexander Botten	52	1.9	
Majority		787		
Turnout			25.9	
Labour hold		Swing		

=== Norton ===
Norton
Party	Candidate	Votes	%	±%
Conservative	Karen Shakespeare	1,500	39.8	
Labour	Andrew Tromans	770	20.4	
Independent	Heather Rogers	568	15.1	
Liberal Democrats	Elaine Sheppard	353	9.4	
UKIP	David Powell	317	8.4	
Green	Mark Binnersley	246	6.5	
Majority		730		
Turnout			38.8	
Conservative gain from Independent		Swing		

=== Pedmore & Stourbridge ===
Pedmore & Stourbridge
Party	Candidate	Votes	%	±%
Conservative	Ian Kettle	1,760	50.2	
Labour	Brian Roe	784	22.4	
UKIP	Glen Wilson	415	11.8	
Liberal Democrats	Simon Hanson	296	8.4	
Green	Catherine Maguire	239	6.8	
Majority		976		
Turnout			35.9	
Conservative hold		Swing		

=== Quarry Bank & Dudley Wood ===
Quarry Bank & Dudley Wood
Party	Candidate	Votes	%	±%
Labour	Jackie Cowell	713	31.8	
Conservative	Christopher Blake	667	29.8	
UKIP	Dean Horton	424	18.9	
Black Country Party	Angela Walker	370	16.5	
Liberal Democrats	David Sheppard	54	2.4	
Majority		46		
Turnout			22.1	
Labour hold		Swing		

=== Sedgley ===
Sedgley
Party	Candidate	Votes	%	±%
Conservative	Tina Westwood	1,805	67.2	
Labour	Stephen Beardsmore	760	28.3	
Majority		1,045		
Turnout			27.9	
Conservative hold		Swing		

=== St. James's ===
St. James's
Party	Candidate	Votes	%	±%
Labour	Cathy Bayton	1,094	45.5	
Conservative	Malcolm Davis	529	22.0	
UKIP	Mick Forsyth	388	16.1	
Black Country Party	Dinesh Patel	205	8.5	
Green	Francis Sheppard	91	3.8	
Liberal Democrats	Claire Bramall	86	3.6	
Majority		565		
Turnout			23.5	
Labour hold		Swing		

=== St. Thomas ===
St. Thomas
Party	Candidate	Votes	%	±%
Labour	Shaneila Mughal	1,757	61.1	
UKIP	Phil Wimlett	474	16.5	
Conservative	Mark Webb	445	15.5	
Green	Daniel Archer	180	6.3	
Majority		1,283		
Turnout			27.7	
Labour hold		Swing		

=== Upper Gornal & Woodsetton ===
Upper Gornal & Woodsetton
Party	Candidate	Votes	%	±%
Labour	Adam Aston	988	37.7	
Black Country Party	Damian Corfield	856	32.6	
Conservative	Jon Turner	751	28.6	
Majority		132		
Turnout			26.1	
Labour hold		Swing		

=== Wollaston & Stourbridge Town ===
Wollaston & Stourbridge Town
Party	Candidate	Votes	%	±%
Conservative	Steve Clark	1,437	36.7	
Labour	Cat Eccles	1,431	36.6	
Black Country Party	David Hunt	330	8.4	
UKIP	Charles Brecknell	323	8.3	
Liberal Democrats	Christopher Bramall	296	7.6	
Independent	Kevin Weston	79	2.0	
Majority		6		
Turnout			37.8	
Conservative hold		Swing		

=== Wordsley ===
Wordsley
Party	Candidate	Votes	%	±%
Conservative	Matt Rogers	1,496	56.2	
Labour	James Callaghan	633	23.8	
Green	Jennifer Slater-Reid	306	11.5	
Liberal Democrats	Alexander Home	161	6.1	
Majority		863		
Turnout			26.5	
Conservative hold		Swing		
