= 2018 Dudley Metropolitan Borough Council election =

2018 UK local government election

- 3 May 2018

24 out of 72 seats to Dudley Metropolitan Borough Council 37 seats needed for a majority

| | First party | Second party |
|---|---|---|
| Leader | Patrick Harley | Pete Lowe |
| Party | Conservative | Labour |
| Last election | 29 seats, 40.3% | 35 seats, 48.6% |
| Seats before | 7 | 10 |
| Seats won | 14 | 10 |
| Seats after | 35 | 35 |
| Seat change | ▲7 | Steady |
| Popular vote | 35,251 | 28,613 |
| Percentage | 48.2% | 39.1% |
| Swing | ▲14.4% | ▲0.7% |
- Winner of each seat at the 2018 Dudley Metropolitan Borough Council election
Council control before election
No Overall Control
Council control after election
No Overall Control

The 2018 Dudley Metropolitan Borough Council election took place on 3 May 2018 to elect members of Dudley Metropolitan Borough Council in England. This was on the same day as other local elections.

== Results summary ==
Dudley Metropolitan Borough Council election result, 2018
| Party | Candidates | | | | | | Votes | | |
| Party | Stood | Elected | Gained | Unseated | Net | % of total | % | No. | Net % |
|---|---|---|---|---|---|---|---|---|---|
| Conservative | 24 | 14 | 7 | Steady | ▲7 | 58.3 | 48.2 | 35,251 | ▲14.4 |
| Labour | 24 | 10 | Steady | Steady | Steady | 41.7 | 39.1 | 28,613 | ▲0.7 |
| UKIP | 19 | 0 | Steady | 7 | ▼7 | 0 | 7.8 | 5,699 | ▼14.7 |
| Liberal Democrats | 12 | 0 | Steady | Steady | Steady | 0 | 2.3 | 1,699 | ▲0.9 |
| Green | 12 | 0 | Steady | Steady | Steady | 0 | 2.3 | 1,681 | ▼1.3 |
| Democrats and Veterans | 1 | 0 | Steady | Steady | Steady | 0 | 0.0 | 65 | N/A |
| Totals | 92 | 24 | | | | 100.0 | 100.0 | 73,003 | |

== Results by ward ==
=== Amblecote ===
Amblecote
| Party | Candidate | Votes | % | ±% |
|---|---|---|---|---|
| Conservative | Paul Bradley | 1,562 | 55.1 | |
| Labour | Peter Drake | 895 | 31.6 | |
| UKIP | Barbara Deeley | 215 | 7.6 | |
| Liberal Democrats | Ian Flynn | 161 | 5.7 | |

=== Belle Vale ===
Belle Vale
| Party | Candidate | Votes | % | ±% |
|---|---|---|---|---|
| Conservative | Jake Cooper | 1,669 | 49.7 | |
| Labour | Ian Cooper | 1534 | 45.7 | |
| Green | Bill McComish | 156 | 4.6 | |

=== Brierley Hill ===
Brierley Hill
| Party | Candidate | Votes | % | ±% |
|---|---|---|---|---|
| Labour | Zafar Islam | 1,078 | 46.3 | |
| Conservative | Phil Atkins | 834 | 35.8 | |
| UKIP | Terry Thorn | 218 | 9.4 | |
| Green | Gordon Elcock | 132 | 5.7 | |
| Democrats and Veterans | John Dyer | 65 | 2.8 | |

=== Brockmore & Pensnett ===
Brockmore & Pensnett
| Party | Candidate | Votes | % | ±% |
|---|---|---|---|---|
| Labour | Judy Foster | 987 | 45.8 | |
| Conservative | Sue Greenaway | 940 | 43.6 | |
| UKIP | Rich Colley | 175 | 8.1 | |
| Liberal Democrats | Clare Bramall | 53 | 2.5 | |

=== Castle & Priory ===
Castle & Priory
| Party | Candidate | Votes | % | ±% |
|---|---|---|---|---|
| Labour | Alan Finch | 1,654 | 59.4 | |
| Conservative | Richard Tasker | 831 | 29.8 | |
| UKIP | Martin Day | 250 | 9.0 | |
| Liberal Democrats | Ryan Priest | 51 | 1.8 | |

=== Coseley East ===
Coseley East
| Party | Candidate | Votes | % | ±% |
|---|---|---|---|---|
| Labour | Bec Gentle | 1,150 | 48.8 | |
| Conservative | Josef Baker | 894 | 37.9 | |
| UKIP | Karen Jones | 249 | 10.6 | |
| Green | Catherine Maguire | 63 | 2.7 | |

=== Cradley & Wollescote ===
Cradley & Wollescote
| Party | Candidate | Votes | % | ±% |
|---|---|---|---|---|
| Labour | Tim Crumpton | 1,425 | 51.6 | |
| Conservative | Kamran Razzaq^{a} | 704 | 26.2 | |
| UKIP | Mitchell Bolton | 487 | 17.6 | |
| Green | Pam Archer | 148 | 5.4 | |

- ^{a} Kamran Razzaq has been suspended by the Conservative Party and is under investigation due to campaign literature he circulated falsely accusing the Labour Party of being responsible for the spreading of Hepatitis. He will remain on the ballot as a Conservative candidate, but in effect is now an independent.

=== Gornal ===
Gornal
| Party | Candidate | Votes | % | ±% |
|---|---|---|---|---|
| Conservative | Bryn Challenor | 1,942 | 58.4 | |
| Labour | Dave Branwood | 1047 | 31.5 | |
| UKIP | Roger Scott-Dow | 270 | 8.1 | |
| Green | Mitch Barlow | 66 | 2.0 | |

=== Halesowen North ===
Halesowen North
| Party | Candidate | Votes | % | ±% |
|---|---|---|---|---|
| Conservative | Joe Roberts | 1,550 | 43.0 | |
| Labour | Parmjit Sahota | 1375 | 38.2 | |
| UKIP | Stuart Henley | 582 | 16.2 | |
| Liberal Democrats | Lois Bramall | 95 | 2.6 | |

=== Halesowen South ===
Halesowen South
| Party | Candidate | Votes | % | ±% |
|---|---|---|---|---|
| Conservative | Ray Burston | 2,321 | 66.2 | |
| Labour | James Walker | 945 | 27.0 | |
| Liberal Democrats | Derek Campbell | 238 | 6.8 | |

=== Hayley Green & Cradley South ===
Hayley Green & Cradley South
| Party | Candidate | Votes | % | ±% |
|---|---|---|---|---|
| Conservative | Andrea Goddard | 1,843 | 61.1 | |
| Labour | Donella Russell | 875 | 29.0 | |
| Green | John Payne | 174 | 5.8 | |
| UKIP | Dalesh Patel | 122 | 4.0 | |

=== Kingswinford North & Wall Heath ===
Kingswinford North & Wall Heath
| Party | Candidate | Votes | % | ±% |
|---|---|---|---|---|
| Conservative | Edward Lawrence | 2,640 | 69.7 | |
| Labour Co-op | Damian Corfield | 952 | 25.1 | |
| Liberal Democrats | Jonathan Bramall | 197 | 5.2 | |

=== Kingswinford South ===
Kingswinford South
| Party | Candidate | Votes | % | ±% |
|---|---|---|---|---|
| Conservative | Patrick Harley | 2,216 | 66.6 | |
| Labour | Jay Griffiths | 922 | 27.7 | |
| Green | Taryn Bradley | 187 | 5.6 | |

=== Lye & Stourbridge North ===
Lye & Stourbridge North
| Party | Candidate | Votes | % | ±% |
|---|---|---|---|---|
| Labour | Pete Lowe | 1,589 | 54.1 | |
| Conservative | Thomas Ruff | 985 | 33.5 | |
| UKIP | Euan Dunn | 229 | 7.8 | |
| Green | Naz Ahmed | 136 | 4.6 | |

=== Netherton, Woodside & St Andrew's ===
Netherton, Woodside & St Andrew's
| Party | Candidate | Votes | % | ±% |
|---|---|---|---|---|
| Labour | Elaine Taylor | 1,376 | 54.9 | |
| Conservative | Martin Berrington | 703 | 28.1 | |
| UKIP | Dean Horton | 246 | 9.8 | |
| Green | Alex Wright | 181 | 7.2 | |

=== Norton ===
Norton
| Party | Candidate | Votes | % | ±% |
|---|---|---|---|---|
| Conservative | Colin Elcock | 2,278 | 61.8 | |
| Labour | Monika Narad | 865 | 23.5 | |
| Liberal Democrats | Christopher Bramall | 400 | 10.8 | |
| UKIP | David Powell | 145 | 3.9 | |

=== Pedmore & Stourbridge East ===
Pedmore & Stourbridge East
| Party | Candidate | Votes | % | ±% |
|---|---|---|---|---|
| Conservative | Angus Lees | 2,269 | 63.2 | |
| Labour | Jon Dean | 897 | 25.0 | |
| Liberal Democrats | Simon Hanson | 258 | 7.2 | |
| UKIP | Glen Wilson | 167 | 4.7 | |

=== Quarry Bank & Dudley Wood ===
Quarry Bank & Dudley Wood
| Party | Candidate | Votes | % | ±% |
|---|---|---|---|---|
| Labour | Chris Barnett | 1,053 | 45.0 | |
| Conservative | Christopher Blake | 957 | 40.9 | |
| UKIP | Angela Walker | 277 | 11.8 | |
| Liberal Democrats | Lee Taylor | 54 | 2.3 | |

=== Sedgley ===
Sedgley
| Party | Candidate | Votes | % | ±% |
|---|---|---|---|---|
| Conservative | Shaun Keasey | 1,936 | 58.9 | |
| Labour | Mushtaq Hussain | 742 | 22.6 | |
| UKIP | Bill Etheridge | 498 | 15.2 | |
| Liberal Democrats | Elaine Sheppard | 110 | 3.3 | |

=== St James's ===
St James's
| Party | Candidate | Votes | % | ±% |
|---|---|---|---|---|
| Labour | Khurshid Ahmed | 1,265 | 48.9 | |
| Conservative | Malcolm Davis | 990 | 38.2 | |
| UKIP | Mick Forsyth | 244 | 9.4 | |
| Liberal Democrats | Benjamin France | 90 | 3.5 | |

=== St Thomas's ===
St Thomas's
| Party | Candidate | Votes | % | ±% |
|---|---|---|---|---|
| Labour | Steve Waltho | 2,121 | 69.4 | |
| Conservative | Jonathan Elliott | 630 | 20.6 | |
| UKIP | Phil Wimlett | 215 | 7.0 | |
| Green | Francis Sheppard | 91 | 3.0 | |

=== Upper Gornal & Woodsetton ===
Upper Gornal & Woodsetton
| Party | Candidate | Votes | % | ±% |
|---|---|---|---|---|
| Conservative | Chris Neale | 1,180 | 41.6 | |
| Labour | Lynette Corfield | 1148 | 40.5 | |
| UKIP | Dean Perks | 431 | 15.2 | |
| Green | Kelly Richards | 79 | 2.8 | |

=== Wollaston & Stourbridge Town ===
Wollaston & Stourbridge Town
| Party | Candidate | Votes | % | ±% |
|---|---|---|---|---|
| Conservative | Nicolas Barlow | 1,914 | 48.4 | |
| Labour | Harriet Foster | 1771 | 44.8 | |
| Green | Andi Mohr | 268 | 6.8 | |

=== Wordsley ===
Wordsley
| Party | Candidate | Votes | % | ±% |
|---|---|---|---|---|
| Conservative | Donna Harley | 1,463 | 45.8 | |
| Labour | Kevin Billingham | 947 | 29.7 | |
| UKIP | Paul Brothwood | 679 | 21.3 | |
| Liberal Democrats | David Sheppard | 102 | 3.2 | |
