= 2014 Dudley Metropolitan Borough Council election =

2014 UK local government election

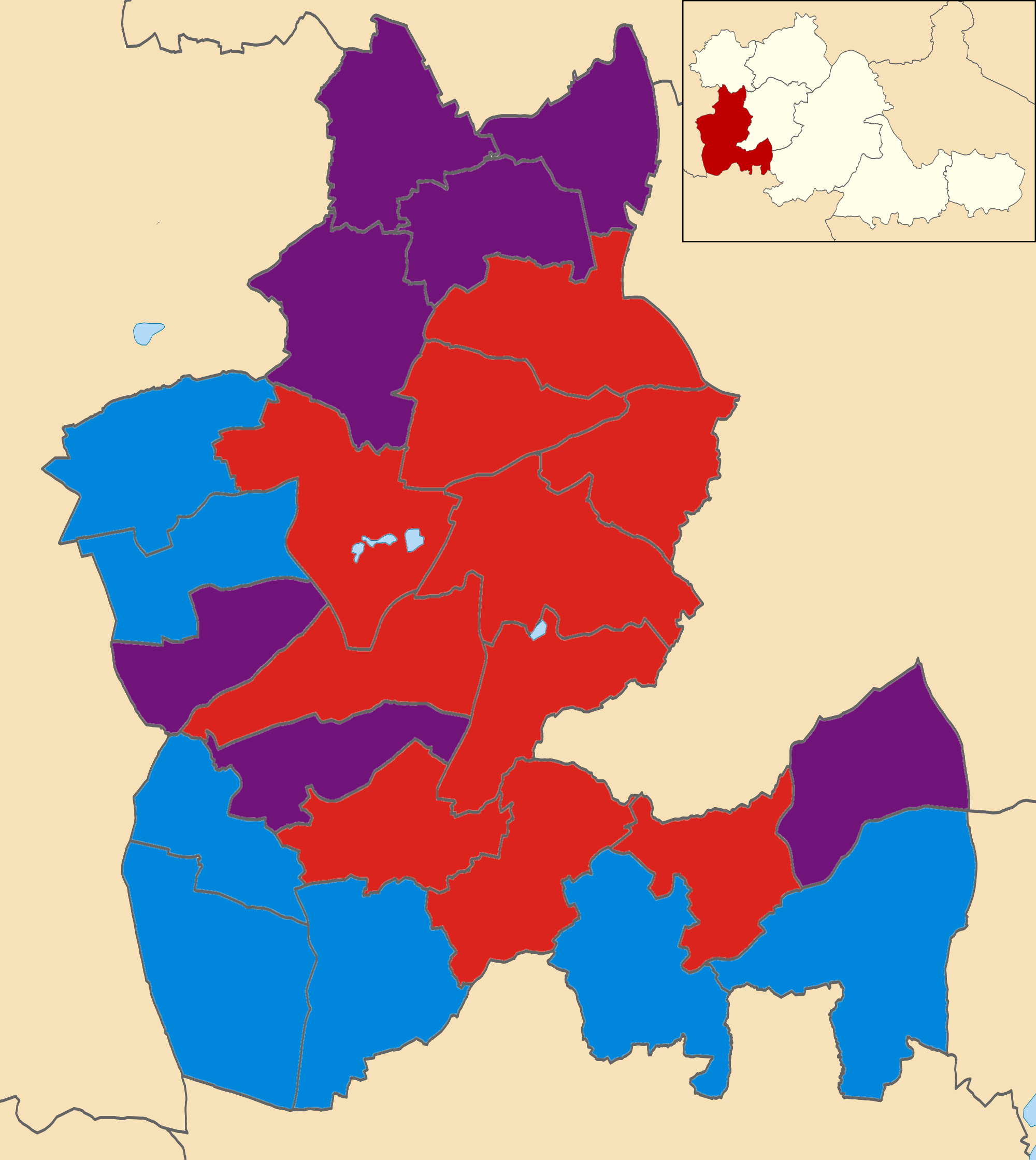
2014 local election results in Dudley

The 2014 Dudley Metropolitan Borough Council election took place on 22 May 2014 to elect members of Dudley Metropolitan Borough Council in England. This was on the same day as other local elections.
