= 2024 Dudley Metropolitan Borough Council election =

Local election in Dudley, England

- 2 May 2024

All 72 seats to Dudley Metropolitan Borough Council 37 seats needed for a majority
- Turnout: 32.3% ▲4.9%
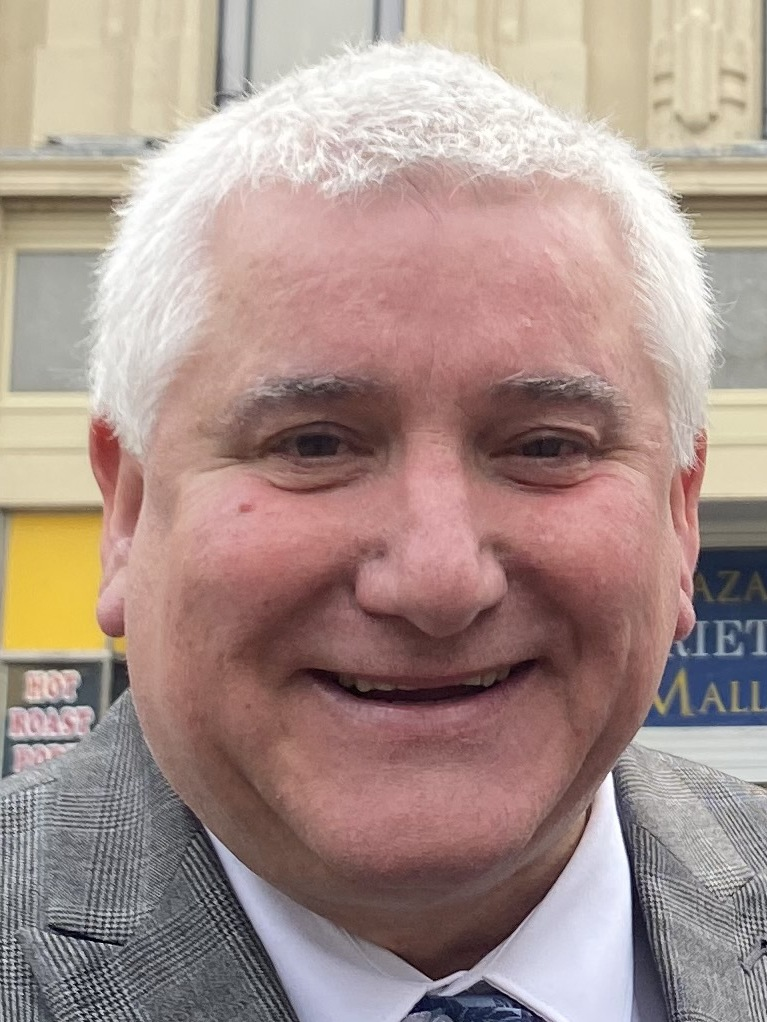
	Majority party	Minority party
Leader	Patrick Harley	Pete Lowe
Party	Conservative	Labour
Last election	44 seats, 42.4%	27 seats, 43.8%
Seats before	41	26
Seats after	34	34
Seat change	▼7	▲8
	Third party	Fourth party
Leader	Ryan Priest
Party	Liberal Democrats	Independent
Last election	0 seats, 5.8%	1 seat, 1.5%
Seats before	1	4
Seats after	3	1
Seat change	▲2	▼3
- Map of the results
Leader before election
Patrick Harley
Conservative
Leader after election
Patrick Harley
Conservative
No overall control

The 2024 Dudley Metropolitan Borough Council election took place on Thursday 2 May 2024 to elect all 72 seats to Dudley Council, alongside the other local elections across the United Kingdom being held on the same day.

Prior to the election the council had been under Conservative majority control since the 2021 election.

The Conservatives lost control of the council, with no party having an overall majority and Labour and the Conservatives ending up with the same number of seats. After a week of negotiations between the Conservative and Labour groups, it was announced that the existing Conservative leader, Patrick Harley, would remain leader of the council (and therefore appoint the council's cabinet) while Labour would be in charge of the majority of the council's scrutiny committee chairmanships and the mayoralty.

== Background ==
=== History ===
The Local Government Act 1972 created a two-tier system of metropolitan counties and districts covering Greater Manchester, Merseyside, South Yorkshire, Tyne and Wear, the West Midlands, and West Yorkshire starting in 1974. Dudley was a district of the West Midlands metropolitan county. The Local Government Act 1985 abolished the metropolitan county councils, with metropolitan districts taking on most of their powers as metropolitan boroughs. The West Midlands Combined Authority was created in 2016 and began electing the mayor of the West Midlands from 2017, which was given strategic powers covering a region coterminous with the West Midlands metropolitan county.

Dudley Council has variously been under Labour control, Conservative control and no overall control since it was established. The Conservatives controlled the council from the 2004 election until Labour gained control in the 2012 election. Labour lost overall control in the 2016 election but continued to lead the council until 2017, when the Conservatives led the council, still without a majority. In the 2021 elections, the Conservatives gained a majority on the council, which they have held since.

In the most recent council election in 2023, the Conservatives won 44 of the 72 seats, one less than prior to the election, while Labour won 27 seats, increasing their membership on the council by 1.

Two by-elections and three defections between the 2023 and 2024 elections changed the council's composition ahead of this election; see 2023 Dudley Metropolitan Borough Council election for details.

=== Electoral process ===
The council usually elects members in thirds every year except the 4th in a four-year cycle. However, due to a boundary review of the wards by the Local Government Boundary Commission for England, all 72 seats to Dudley Metropolitan Borough Council were up for election in 2024.

== Previous council composition ==
After 2023 election		Before 2024 election		After 2024 election	
Party	Seats	Party	Seats	Party	Seats
Conservative	44	Conservative	41	Conservative	34
Labour	27	Labour	26	Labour	34
Independent	1	Independent	4	Independent	1
Liberal Democrats	0	Liberal Democrats	1	Liberal Democrats	3

The changes underlying the "Before 2024 election" column are detailed on the 2023 election article.

== Ward results ==
2024 Dudley Metropolitan Borough Council election
Party	Seats	Gains	Losses	Net gain/loss	Seats %	Votes %	Votes	+/−
Conservative	34	2	9	▼7	47	38.1	30,901	–4.3
Labour	34	10	2	▲8	47	37.7	30,599	-6.1
Liberal Democrats	3	2	0	▲2	4	8.5	6,854	+2.7
Green	0	0	0	Steady	0.0	6.7	5,394	+1.4
Independent	1	0	3	▼3	1	6.5	5,236	+5.0
Reform	0	0	0	Steady	0.0	1.9	1,515	+1.2
TUSC	0	0	0	Steady	0.0	0.5	412	+0.1
Freedom Alliance	0	0	0	Steady	0.0	0.2	160	N/A

An asterisk indicates an incumbent councillor. (Does not apply to Damian Corfield who was an incumbent but became councillor for a different ward in the election)

=== Amblecote ===
Amblecote
Party	Candidate	Votes	%	±%
Conservative	Paul William Bradley*	1,754	55.3	
Conservative	Pete Lee*	1,570	49.5	
Conservative	Kamran Razzaq*	1,307	41.2	
Labour	Erin Charlotte Billingham	1,040	32.8	
Labour	Harriet Caroline Foster	985	31.1	
Labour	Molly Savage	924	29.1	
Green	Adrian Norman Mabe	262	8.3	
Independent	Glen Wilson	233	7.4	
Independent	Maxim Lowe	219	6.9	
Liberal Democrats	Mollie Jo Priest	180	5.7	
Rejected ballots		24	0.8	
Turnout		3,170	31.6	+5.46
Conservative hold		Swing		
Conservative hold		Swing		
Conservative hold		Swing		

=== Belle Vale ===
Belle Vale
Party	Candidate	Votes	%	±%
Conservative	Simon Dennis Phipps*	1,679	51.3	
Conservative	Daniel James Bevan*	1,482	45.2	
Conservative	Peter William Dobb*	1,425	43.5	
Labour	Fiona Jane Murray	1,289	39.3	
Labour	Donella Joy Russell	1,247	38.1	
Labour	Joseph Eulogio	1,211	37.0	
Liberal Democrats	Sarah Louise Furhuraire	243	7.4	
Rejected ballots		24	0.7	
Turnout		3276	33.41	+3.21
Conservative hold		Swing		
Conservative hold		Swing		
Conservative hold		Swing		

=== Brierley Hill and Wordsley South ===
Brierley Hill and Wordsley South
Party	Candidate	Votes	%	±%
Conservative	Adam Davies*	1,160	43.4	
Conservative	Wayne Little*	1,075	40.2	
Labour	Matthew James Cook	1,048	39.2	
Conservative	Danny Shaw	1,020	38.2	
Labour	John Ronald Martin*	1,018	38.1	
Labour	Marva Iotha Inniss	905	33.9	
Green	Andrew Bennett	330	12.4	
Liberal Democrats	Aneesa Nawaz	167	6.3	
TUSC	Kevin Carnall	155	5.8	
Liberal Democrats	Abdul Qadus	137	5.1	
Rejected ballots		24	0.9	
Turnout		2672	26.35	+3.74
Conservative hold		Swing		
Conservative hold		Swing		
Labour hold		Swing		

=== Brockmoor and Pensnett ===
Brockmoor and Pensnett
Party	Candidate	Votes	%	±%
Labour	Judy Foster*	1,382	59.5	
Labour	Steve Edwards	1,310	56.4	
Labour	Karen Westwood*	1,246	53.7	
Conservative	Alex Dale	617	26.6	
Conservative	Dan Barras	573	24.7	
Conservative	Eric Perry	560	24.1	
Liberal Democrats	Ian Martin Flynn	173	7.5	
Rejected ballots		34	1.5	
Turnout		2322	23.27	+4.16
Labour hold		Swing		
Labour gain from Conservative		Swing		
Labour hold		Swing		

=== Castle and Priory ===
Castle and Priory
Party	Candidate	Votes	%	±%
Labour	Keiran Robert Casey*	1,129	46.4	
Conservative	Faye Barras	1,056	43.4	
Labour	Karl Denning*	1,014	41.6	
Labour	Donna Flurry-Haddock	930	38.2	
Conservative	Saadat Khan	787	32.3	
Conservative	Wafa Khan	739	30.3	
Liberal Democrats	David Ashley Bramall	271	11.1	
Rejected ballots		42	1.7	
Turnout		2435	25.35	+5.59
Labour hold		Swing		
Conservative gain from Labour		Swing		
Labour hold		Swing		

=== Coseley ===
Coseley
Party	Candidate	Votes	%	±%
Labour	Peter Drake*	1,272	55.7	
Labour	Sue Ridney*	1,181	51.7	
Labour	David Christopher Roberts	1,056	46.2	
Conservative	Jake Christopher David Fountain	582	25.5	
Conservative	Dennis John Phipps	511	22.4	
Conservative	Henry Oche	496	21.7	
Green	Claire Elizabeth Beech	277	12.1	
Green	Konstantins Bokarevs	169	7.4	
Rejected ballots		37	1.6	
Turnout		2285	24.37	+4.66
Labour hold		Swing		
Labour hold		Swing		
Labour hold		Swing		

=== Cradley North and Wollescote ===
Cradley North and Wollescote
Party	Candidate	Votes	%	±%
Liberal Democrats	Ryan Ashley Priest*	1,627	53.2	
Liberal Democrats	Kash Khan	1,120	36.6	
Liberal Democrats	Ethan Brian Stafford	1,049	34.3	
Labour	Tim Crumpton*	1,020	33.4	
Labour	Rachael Anne Gardener	861	28.2	
Labour	Mahdi Amen Mutahar	673	22.0	
Conservative	Natalie Anne Neale*	581	19.0	
Conservative	Samantha Hadley	575	18.8	
Conservative	Christopher Sturman-Sprigg	530	17.3	
TUSC	Siobhan Halloran	89	2.9	
Rejected ballots		29	0.9	
Turnout		3057	33.41	+4.41
Liberal Democrats hold		Swing		
Liberal Democrats gain from Labour		Swing		
Liberal Democrats gain from Conservative		Swing		

=== Gornal ===
Gornal
Party	Candidate	Votes	%	±%
Conservative	David Stanley*	1,271	41.6	
Conservative	Bryn Challenor*	1,114	36.5	
Labour	Stuart Turner	898	29.4	
Independent	Anne Millward	852	27.9	
Conservative	Claire Sullivan*	810	26.5	
Labour	Joanne Hazel Anne Morgan	764	25.0	
Independent	Mark Westwood	590	19.3	
Labour	Harjinder Singh	569	18.6	
Reform	Nathan Paul Hunt	554	18.2	
Rejected ballots		14	0.5	
Turnout		3052	30.45	+4.24
Conservative hold		Swing		
Conservative hold		Swing		
Labour gain from Conservative		Swing		

=== Halesowen North ===
Halesowen North
Party	Candidate	Votes	%	±%
Labour	Hilary Bills*	1,744	50.9	
Labour	Parmjit Singh Sahota*	1,477	43.1	
Conservative	Stuart Carl Henley*	1,429	41.7	
Labour	Helen Clare Betts-Patel	1,286	37.6	
Conservative	Laura Taylor-Childs	918	26.8	
Conservative	John Robert Small	908	26.5	
Green	Rachel Jane Hewlett	292	8.5	
Independent	Abdul Razzaq	279	8.2	
Green	Ashley Patrick Flavin	278	8.1	
Liberal Democrats	Tracey Gregg	160	4.7	
Rejected ballots		23	0.7	
Turnout		3423	35.39	+3.63
Labour hold		Swing		
Labour hold		Swing		
Conservative hold		Swing		

=== Halesowen South ===
Halesowen South
Party	Candidate	Votes	%	±%
Conservative	Alan Taylor*	1,876	52.5	
Conservative	Jeff Hill	1,816	50.8	
Conservative	Thomas Geoffrey Russon*	1,566	43.8	
Labour	Stephen Hilton	1,222	34.2	
Labour	Jo Plant	1,059	29.6	
Labour	Fady Jadayel	1,018	28.5	
Green	James Robert Windridge	569	15.9	
Liberal Democrats	Saima Chadney Furhuraire	236	6.6	
Rejected ballots		34	1.0	
Turnout		3576	37.85	+5.14
Conservative hold		Swing		
Conservative hold		Swing		
Conservative hold		Swing		

=== Hayley Green and Cradley South ===
Hayley Green and Cradley South
Party	Candidate	Votes	%	±%
Conservative	Andrea Goddard*	1,638	51.9	
Conservative	Ian James Bevan*	1,599	50.6	
Conservative	Bex Collins	1,483	47.0	
Labour	Tony Barnsley	1171	37.1	
Labour	Michael Joseph Hanley	1142	36.2	
Labour	Zac Barnsley	1109	35.1	
Liberal Democrats	Ranjeet Furhuraire	255	8.1	
Rejected ballots		39	1.2	
Turnout		3158	34.72	+4.99
Conservative hold		Swing		
Conservative hold		Swing		
Conservative hold		Swing		

=== Kingswinford North and Wall Heath ===
Kingswinford North and Wall Heath
Party	Candidate	Votes	%	±%
Conservative	Phil Atkins*	1,775	47.1	
Conservative	Edward Robert Lawrence*	1,629	43.2	
Conservative	Mark Webb*	1,497	39.7	
Independent	Shaz Saleem	1388	36.8	
Independent	Cassie Gray	968	25.7	
Labour	Karen Mary Jordan	799	21.2	
Labour	Tremaine Herbert	739	19.6	
Labour	Rick Nelson	707	18.8	
Liberal Democrats	Simon Paul Hanson	173	4.6	
Liberal Democrats	Stephen Holmes	119	3.2	
Rejected ballots		20	0.5	
Turnout		3768	39.37	+6.75
Conservative hold		Swing		
Conservative hold		Swing		
Conservative hold		Swing		

=== Kingswinford South ===
Kingswinford South
Party	Candidate	Votes	%	±%
Conservative	Patrick Harley*	1,516	44.0	
Conservative	Sue Greenaway	1,435	41.6	
Conservative	Luke Johnson*	1,170	33.9	
Labour	Simon Daniel	1102	32.0	
Labour	Dave Woolley	851	24.7	
Labour	Domenico Palermo	712	20.6	
Independent	Michelle Hammond	632	18.3	
Independent	Brian Bassingthwaighte	617	17.9	
Independent	Peter Phillip Miller*	521	15.1	
Independent	Adam Waldron	456	13.2	
Green	Chris Walker	231	6.7	
Liberal Democrats	Roxanne Enid Holmes	117	3.4	
Rejected ballots		21	0.6	
Turnout		3449	34.76	+5.01
Conservative hold		Swing		
Conservative gain from Independent		Swing		
Conservative hold		Swing		

=== Lye and Stourbridge North ===
Lye and Stourbridge North
Party	Candidate	Votes	%	±%
Labour	Pete Lowe*	1,318	41.0	
Labour	Mohammed Hanif*	1,314	40.8	
Labour	Ellen Hope Cobb	1,200	37.3	
Conservative	Dave Borley*	1008	31.3	
Conservative	Muhammad Imtiyaz Ali	892	27.7	
Conservative	Shazad Mahmood	807	25.1	
Liberal Democrats	Gary Farmer	625	19.4	
Liberal Democrats	Naz Ahmed	569	17.7	
Liberal Democrats	Steven Parish	334	10.4	
Green	Mark Binnersley	296	9.2	
Rejected ballots		32	1.0	
Turnout		3217	33.99	+6.45
Labour hold		Swing		
Labour hold		Swing		
Labour gain from Conservative		Swing		

=== Netherton and Holly Hall ===
Netherton and Holly Hall
Party	Candidate	Votes	%	±%
Labour	Elaine Taylor*	1,433	54.1	
Labour	Qasim Mughal	1,182	44.6	
Labour	Shaneila Mughal	1,094	41.3	
Conservative	Martin Berrington	733	27.6	
Conservative	Viorica Faraji	500	18.9	
Green	Jamie Dennis Smith	422	15.9	
Conservative	James Warner Tye	393	14.8	
Liberal Democrats	Robert Owen Johns	263	9.9	
Rejected ballots		74	2.8	
Turnout		2651	25.99	+4.71
Labour hold		Swing		
Labour gain from Conservative		Swing		
Labour hold		Swing		

=== Norton ===
Norton
Party	Candidate	Votes	%	±%
Conservative	Tony Creed*	1,922	50.2	
Conservative	Steve Clark*	1,747	45.6	
Conservative	Alan Harry Hopwood	1,524	39.8	
Labour	Matthew Robert Broad	1111	29.0	
Labour	Benjamin James McCloskey	925	24.2	
Labour	Alexander Rhys Quarrie-Jones	864	22.6	
Green	Ant Dugmore	739	19.3	
Green	Stephen James Price	695	18.1	
Green	Olof Lee	649	16.9	
Liberal Democrats	Elaine Catherine Sheppard	270	7.0	
Rejected ballots		29	0.8	
Turnout		3830	41.87	+4.67
Conservative hold		Swing		
Conservative hold		Swing		
Conservative hold		Swing		

=== Pedmore and Stourbridge East ===
Pedmore and Stourbridge East
Party	Candidate	Votes	%	±%
Conservative	Ian Marshall Kettle*	1,924	48.9	
Conservative	James Robert Clinton*	1,836	46.7	
Conservative	Jason Thorne	1,522	38.7	
Labour	Mark Christopher Kent	1212	30.8	
Labour	Ceri Wynn Owens	1138	28.9	
Labour	Paul Robert Hebron	1058	26.9	
Liberal Democrats	Nigel Paul Kirkham	662	16.8	
Liberal Democrats	David John Sheppard	447	11.4	
Liberal Democrats	Vi Wood	446	11.3	
Green	Beth Scrimshaw	416	10.6	
Rejected ballots		29	0.7	
Turnout		3932	42.23	+6.03
Conservative hold		Swing		
Conservative hold		Swing		
Conservative hold		Swing		

=== Quarry Bank and Dudley Wood ===
Quarry Bank and Dudley Wood
Party	Candidate	Votes	%	±%
Labour	Jackie Cowell*	1,190	49.3	
Labour	Luke Hamblett	1,062	44.0	
Labour	Ashley Smith	1,039	43.0	
Conservative	Robert Edward Clinton*	975	40.4	
Conservative	Jennie Dunn	825	34.2	
Conservative	Lisa Joan Jones	655	27.1	
Liberal Democrats	Richard Priest	261	10.8	
Rejected ballots		35	1.4	
Turnout		2415	24.72	+5.50
Labour hold		Swing		
Labour hold		Swing		
Labour gain from Conservative		Swing		

=== Sedgley ===
Sedgley
Party	Candidate	Votes	%	±%
Conservative	Damian Corfield	1,625	45.8	
Conservative	Ian Sandall	1,468	41.4	
Independent	Shaun Roger Keasey*	1,110	31.3	
Conservative	Sat Khan	1043	29.4	
Labour	Tony Middleton	921	26.0	
Labour	Hamza Faisal Ahmed	712	20.1	
Independent	Brad Steven Simms	665	18.8	
Labour	Jeff Ndlovu	638	18.0	
Green	Colin Drewery	417	11.8	
Green	Samson Lee Oakley	263	7.4	
Rejected ballots		33	0.9	
Turnout		3545	33.26	+3.09
Conservative hold		Swing		
Conservative hold		Swing		
Independent hold		Swing		

=== St James's ===
St James's
Party	Candidate	Votes	%	±%
Labour	Cathryn Jayne Bayton*	1,410	48.5	
Labour	Asif Ahmed	1,185	40.7	
Labour	Caroline Reid*	1,113	38.3	
Conservative	Sara Bothul*	996	34.2	
Conservative	Can Ibrahim	759	26.1	
Conservative	Roman Chapman	757	26.0	
Reform	Richard John Tasker	432	14.9	
Green	Tomass Jereminovics	256	8.8	
Liberal Democrats	Richard Wanklin	203	7.0	
Rejected ballots		28	1.0	
Turnout		2909	28.60	+6.06
Labour hold		Swing		
Labour gain from Conservative		Swing		
Labour hold		Swing		

=== St Thomas's ===
St Thomas's
Party	Candidate	Votes	%	±%
Labour	Shaukat Ali*	1,764	49.8	
Labour	Shazna Azad	1,441	40.7	
Labour	Adeela Qayyum*	1,410	39.8	
Independent	Shakeela Bibi	742	21.0	
Independent	Choudhary Noor-Hussain	679	19.2	
Independent	Muhammad Najeeb	679	19.2	
Conservative	Carole Blackmore	675	19.1	
Conservative	Michael Lewis	640	18.1	
Conservative	Sajid Hanif	636	18.0	
Liberal Democrats	John Slim	221	6.2	
Green	Zia Qari	221	6.2	
TUSC	David Reynolds	168	4.7	
Rejected ballots		46	1.3	
Turnout		3540	33.24	+4.13
Labour hold		Swing		
Labour hold		Swing		
Labour hold		Swing		

=== Upper Gornal and Woodsetton ===
Upper Gornal and Woodsetton
Party	Candidate	Votes	%	±%
Labour	Adam Michael Aston	1,534	55.4	
Labour	Carol June Littler	1,220	44.1	
Labour	Mushtaq Hussain	950	34.3	
Conservative	Kane Watton	828	29.9	
Conservative	Lucy Watton	774	28.0	
Conservative	William Watton	754	27.2	
Reform	Shaun Farrow	529	19.1	
Liberal Democrats	Caroline Mary Benton	183	6.6	
Rejected ballots		28	1.0	
Turnout		2769	28.15	+4.52
Labour hold		Swing		
Labour gain from Independent		Swing		
Labour gain from Independent		Swing		

=== Wollaston and Stourbridge Town ===
Wollaston and Stourbridge Town
Party	Candidate	Votes	%	±%
Labour	Cat Eccles*	2,401	56.4	
Labour	Andrew Michael Edward Tromans*	1,769	41.6	
Labour	Jason Robert Griffin	1,647	38.7	
Conservative	Nicolas Anthony Barlow	1619	38.0	
Conservative	Lisa Marie Clinton	1358	31.9	
Conservative	Matt Dudley	1199	28.2	
Liberal Democrats	Christopher Ashley Bramall	424	10.0	
Green	Linda Carol Foster	389	9.1	
Green	Andi Mohr	387	9.1	
Freedom Alliance	Ken Moore	160	3.8	
Rejected ballots		23	0.5	
Turnout		4256	41.96	+4.90
Labour hold		Swing		
Labour hold		Swing		
Labour gain from Conservative		Swing		

=== Wordsley North ===
Wordsley North
Party	Candidate	Votes	%	±%
Conservative	Kerry Lewis*	1,662	52.4	
Conservative	Donna Harley*	1,257	39.7	
Labour	Keith Archer	1,189	37.5	
Conservative	Matt Rogers*	1184	37.4	
Labour	Sarah Daniel	1120	35.3	
Labour	Kevin Billingham	1113	35.1	
Green	Pam Archer	277	8.7	
Liberal Democrats	Jonathan Michael Bramall	140	4.4	
Rejected ballots		32	1.0	
Turnout		3170	32.58	+5.28
Conservative hold		Swing		
Conservative hold		Swing		
Labour gain from Conservative		Swing		

== Changes 2024–2026 ==
- 26 September 2024: Andrew Tromans (Labour) left the party to sit as an independent, citing bullying and a loss of hope in the party's direction.
- 7 February 2025: Steve Edwards (Labour) was suspended from the party.
- 1 March 2025: Andrew Tromans (Independent) joined the Liberal Democrats.
- 18 March 2025: Pete Lowe (Labour, Lye and Stourbridge North), leader of the Dudley Labour group, resigned his leadership role and his party membership, citing the national party's welfare policy under Keir Starmer; he continued to sit as an independent.
- 20 March 2025: Councillors Peter Drake (Coseley), Karl Denning (Castle and Priory) and Matthew Cook (Brierley Hill and Wordsley South) resigned from the Labour Party in the wake of Lowe's departure, also citing the party's welfare policy, and continued to sit as independents. Luke Hamblett and Karen Westwood (Brockmoor and Pensnett) left the party in the same wave of departures.
- 23 April 2025: Luke Hamblett (Independent) joined the Liberal Democrats.
- 15 May 2025: Stuart Turner (Labour) left the party to sit as an independent.
- 30 May 2025: The Black Country Party was formed; Matt Cook, Karl Denning, Peter Drake, Steve Edwards, Pete Lowe and Karen Westwood, all then sitting as independents, joined the new party.
- 23 June 2025: Shaun Keasey (Independent, Sedgley) joined Reform UK.
- 11 November 2025: James Clinton and Jason Thorne (both Conservative) joined Reform UK.
- 25 February 2026: Cat Eccles (Labour, Wollaston and Stourbridge Town) resigned as a councillor; her seat remained vacant until the 2026 election.

=== By-elections ===
==== Brockmoor and Pensnett ====
Brockmoor and Pensnett: 19 December 2024
Party	Candidate	Votes	%	±%
Conservative	Alex Richard Dale	571	35.4	
Reform	Richard John Tasker	485	30.1	
Labour	Karen Mary Jordan	466	28.9	
Green	Ant Dugmore	49	3.0	
Liberal Democrats	David John Sheppard	24	1.5	
Independent	Cassie Gray	16	1.0	
Majority		86	5.3	
Turnout		1,614		
Conservative gain from Labour		Swing		

The by-election was triggered by the resignation of Labour councillor Judy Foster, deputy leader of the Dudley Labour group, who had represented the ward for 20 years and cited safety concerns.
