= 2026 Dudley Metropolitan Borough Council election =

2026 English local government election

- 7 May 2026

25 out of 72 seats to Dudley Metropolitan Borough Council (including 1 by-election) 37 seats needed for a majority
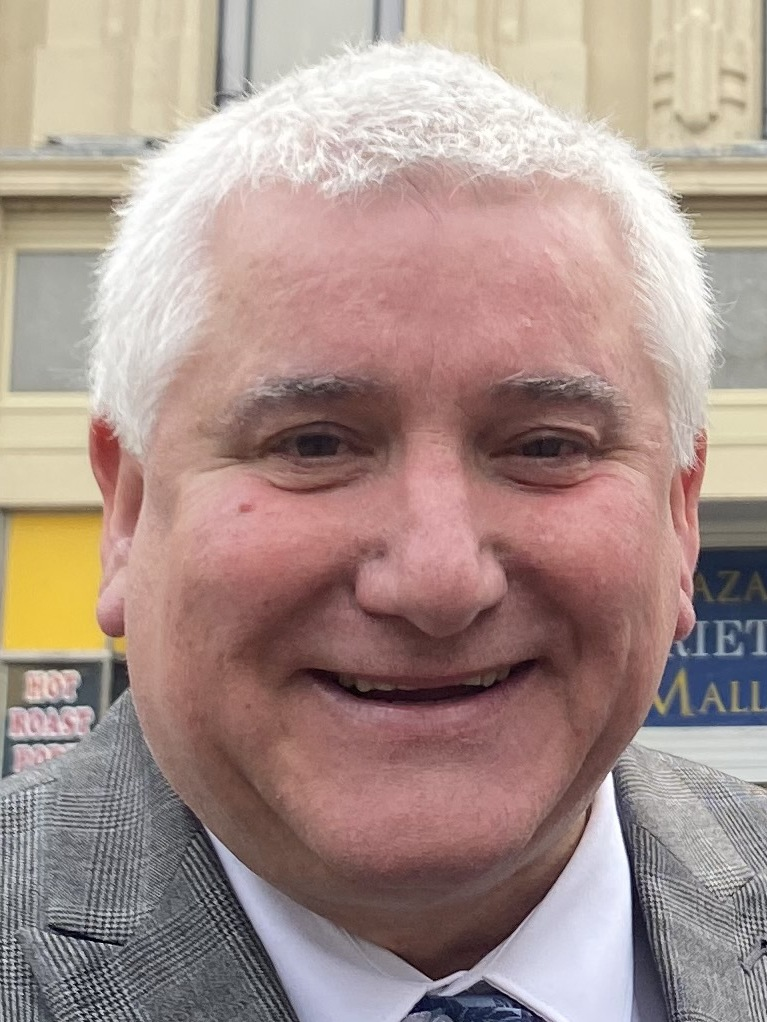
| | First party | Second party | Third party |
|---|---|---|---|
| Leader | Patrick Harley | None | Adam Aston |
| Party | Conservative | Reform | Labour |
| Last election | 34 seats, 38.1% | 0 seats, 1.9% | 34 seats, 37.7% |
| Seats before | 33 | 3 | 24 (Note: Includes the vacant seat in Wollaston & Stourbridge Town last held by Labour.) |
| Seats won | 2 | 22 | 1 |
| Seats after | 27 | 23 | 15 |
| Seat change | ▼6 | ▲20 | ▼9 |
| Popular vote | 21,879 | 41,775 | 16,049 |
| Percentage | 21.9% | 41.9% | 16.1% |
| Swing | ▼16.2% | ▲40.0% | ▼21.6% |
| | Fourth party | Fifth party | Sixth party |
| Leader | Ryan Priest | Pete Lowe | None |
| Party | Liberal Democrats | Black Country Party | Independent |
| Last election | 3 seats, 7.6% | Did not exist | 0 seats, 0.5% |
| Seats before | 5 | 6 | 1 |
| Seats won | 0 | 0 | 0 |
| Seats after | 4 | 3 | 0 |
| Seat change | ▼1 | ▼3 | ▼1 |
| Popular vote | 7,532 | 1,541 | 541 |
| Percentage | 7.6% | 1.5% | 0.5% |
| Swing | ▼0.9% | N/A | ▼6.0% |
- Winner of each seat at the 2026 Dudley Metropolitan Borough Council election.
Leader before election
Patrick Harley
Conservative
No overall control (Note: Conservative minority.)
Leader after election
Patrick Harley
Conservative
No overall control (Note: Conservative minority.)

The 2026 Dudley Metropolitan Borough Council election was held on Thursday 7 May 2026 to elect a third of Dudley Metropolitan Borough Council. It was held alongside council elections across England.

Prior to the election, the council was under no overall control. The Conservatives were the largest party and ran the council as a minority administration. At this election, the council remained under no overall control. The Conservatives lost seats, but remained the largest party. Reform UK won 22 of the 25 seats being contested at this election, and overtook Labour to become the second largest party on the council. The Conservative minority administration continued after the election. The incumbent Conservative leader of the council, Patrick Harley, was reappointed to the role at the subsequent annual council meeting on 28 May 2026, defeating an attempt by Reform to remove him from the post.

== Previous council composition ==
| After 2024 election | | Before 2026 election | |
| Party | Seats | Party | Seats |
|---|---|---|---|
| Conservative | 34 | Conservative | 33 |
| Labour | 34 | Labour | 23 |
| Black Country Party | N/A | Black Country Party | 6 |
| Liberal Democrats | 3 | Liberal Democrats | 5 |
| Reform | 0 | Reform | 3 |
| Independent | 1 | Independent | 1 |
| Vacant | N/A | Vacant | 1 |

The changes underlying the "Before 2026 election" column are detailed on the 2024 election article.

== Background ==
=== History ===
The Local Government Act 1972 created a two-tier system of metropolitan counties and districts covering Greater Manchester, Merseyside, South Yorkshire, Tyne and Wear, the West Midlands, and West Yorkshire starting in 1974. Dudley was a district of the West Midlands metropolitan county. The Local Government Act 1985 abolished the metropolitan county councils, with metropolitan districts taking on most of their powers as metropolitan boroughs. The West Midlands Combined Authority was created in 2016 and began electing the mayor of the West Midlands from 2017, which was given strategic powers covering a region coterminous with the West Midlands metropolitan county.

Dudley Council has variously been under Labour control, Conservative control and no overall control since it was established. The Conservatives controlled the council from the 2004 election until Labour gained control in the 2012 election. Labour lost overall control in the 2016 election but continued to lead the council until 2017, when the Conservatives led the council, still without a majority. In the 2021 elections, the Conservatives gained a majority on the council, which they kept in the 2023 election.

The Conservatives lost control of the council in the most recent election in 2024, with no party having an overall majority and Labour and the Conservatives ending up with the same number of seats. After a week of negotiations between the Conservative and Labour groups, it was announced that the existing Conservative leader, Patrick Harley, would remain leader of the council (and therefore appoint the council's cabinet) while Labour would be in charge of the majority of the council's scrutiny committee chairmanships and the mayoralty.

In 2025, six Labour councillors including former Labour group leader Pete Lowe left the party to form the Black Country Party.

=== Electoral process ===
The council elects members in thirds every year except the 4th in a four-year cycle. Due to a boundary review of the wards by the Local Government Boundary Commission for England, all 72 seats to Dudley Metropolitan Borough Council were up in the previous election in 2024.

== Election result ==
Council composition after the 2024 election

Council composition after the 2026 election

2026 Dudley Metropolitan Borough Council election
| Party | This election | | | | Full council | | | This election | | |
| Party | Candidates | Seats | Net | Seats % | Other | Total | Total % | Votes | Votes % | +/− |
|---|---|---|---|---|---|---|---|---|---|---|
| Conservative | {{{candidates}}} | 2 | ▼6 | 8.3 | 25 | 27 | 37.5 | 21,879 | 21.9 | –16.2 |
| Reform | {{{candidates}}} | 22 | ▲20 | 87.5 | 1 | 23 | 31.9 | 41,775 | 41.9 | +40.0 |
| Labour | {{{candidates}}} | 1 | ▼9 | 4.2 | 14 | 15 | 20.8 | 16,049 | 16.1 | –21.6 |
| Liberal Democrats | {{{candidates}}} | 0 | ▼1 | 0.0 | 4 | 4 | 5.6 | 7,532 | 7.6 | –0.9 |
| Black Country Party | {{{candidates}}} | 0 | ▼3 | 0.0 | 3 | 3 | 4.2 | 1,541 | 1.5 | N/A |
| Green | {{{candidates}}} | 0 | Steady | 0.0 | 0 | 0 | 0.0 | 10,284 | 10.3 | +3.6 |
| Independent | {{{candidates}}} | 0 | ▼1 | 0.0 | 0 | 0 | 0.0 | 541 | 0.5 | –6.0 |
| Freedom Alliance | {{{candidates}}} | 0 | Steady | 0.0 | 0 | 0 | 0.0 | 61 | 0.1 | –0.1 |
| TUSC | {{{candidates}}} | 0 | Steady | 0.0 | 0 | 0 | 0.0 | 30 | <0.1 | –0.5 |
| Libertarian | {{{candidates}}} | 0 | Steady | 0.0 | 0 | 0 | 0.0 | 25 | <0.1 | N/A |

== Incumbents ==
| Ward | Incumbent councillor | Party | Re-standing |
|---|---|---|---|
| Amblecote | Kamran Razzaq | Conservative | Yes |
| Belle Vale | Simon Phipps | Conservative | No |
| Brierley Hill & Wordsley South | Matthew Cook (Note: Originally elected as Labour, but defected to the Black Country Party in June 2025.) | Black Country Party | No |
| Brockmoor & Pensnett | Karen Westwood | Black Country Party | Yes |
| Castle & Priory | Karl Denning | Black Country Party | Yes |
| Coseley | Dave Roberts | Labour | Yes |
| Cradley North & Wollescote | Ethan Stafford | Liberal Democrats | Yes |
| Gornal | Stuart Turner | Independent | No |
| Halesowen North | Stuart Henley | Conservative | Yes |
| Halesowen South | Thomas Russon | Conservative | Yes |
| Hayley Green & Cradley South | Bex Collins | Conservative | Yes |
| Kingswinford North & Wall Heath | Mark Webb | Conservative | Yes |
| Kingswinford South | Luke Johnson | Conservative | Yes |
| Lye & Stourbridge North | Ellen Cobb | Labour | Yes |
| Netherton & Holly Hall | Shaneila Mughal | Labour | Yes |
| Norton | Alan Hopwood | Conservative | Yes |
| Pedmore & Stourbridge East | Jason Thorne (Note: Originally elected as a Conservative, but defected to Reform in November 2025.) | Reform | Yes |
| Quarry Bank & Dudley Wood | Ashley Smith | Labour | No |
| Sedgley | Shaun Keasey (Note: Originally elected as a Conservative, but defected to Reform in June 2025.) | Reform | Yes |
| St James's | Caroline Reid | Labour | Yes |
| St Thomas's | Adeela Qayyum | Labour | Yes |
| Upper Gornal & Woodsetton | Mushtaq Hussain | Labour | Yes |
| Wollaston & Stourbridge Town | Jason Griffin | Labour | Yes |
| Wordsley North | Keith Archer | Labour | Yes |

== Ward results ==
Sitting councillors standing for re-election are marked with an asterisk (*).

=== Amblecote ===
Amblecote
| Party | Candidate | Votes | % | ±% |
|---|---|---|---|---|
| Reform | Wayne Lewis | 1,685 | 40.1 | N/A |
| Conservative | Kamran Razzaq* | 1,522 | 36.2 | –14.4 |
| Labour | Benjamin McCloskey | 435 | 10.4 | –19.6 |
| Green | Adrian Mabe | 325 | 7.7 | +0.1 |
| Liberal Democrats | Ian Flynn | 233 | 5.5 | +0.3 |
| Majority | | 163 | 3.9 | N/A |
| Turnout | | 4,200 | 41.2 | +9.6 |
| Registered electors | | ~10,204 | | |
| Reform gain from Conservative | | | | |

=== Belle Vale ===
Belle Vale
| Party | Candidate | Votes | % | ±% |
|---|---|---|---|---|
| Reform | Angela Blythe | 1,437 | 35.6 | N/A |
| Conservative | Peter Dobb* | 1,263 | 31.3 | –21.0 |
| Labour | Ben Pugh | 736 | 18.2 | –21.9 |
| Green | Steve Hilton | 465 | 11.5 | N/A |
| Liberal Democrats | Richard Wanklin | 137 | 3.4 | –4.2 |
| Majority | | 174 | 4.3 | N/A |
| Turnout | | 4,038 | 41.1 | +7.7 |
| Registered electors | | ~9,827 | | |
| Reform gain from Conservative | | | | |

=== Brierley Hill & Wordsley South ===
Brierley Hill & Wordsley South
| Party | Candidate | Votes | % | ±% |
|---|---|---|---|---|
| Reform | Tony Dickenson | 1,365 | 42.6 | N/A |
| Conservative | Shane Birch-Bastock | 718 | 22.4 | –18.2 |
| Labour | Karen Jones | 408 | 12.7 | –23.9 |
| Green | Andrew Bennett | 355 | 11.1 | –0.4 |
| Black Country Party | Wayne Lewis | 237 | 7.4 | N/A |
| Liberal Democrats | Aneesa Nawaz | 122 | 3.8 | –2.0 |
| Majority | | 647 | 20.1 | N/A |
| Turnout | | 3,205 | 31.2 | +4.9 |
| Registered electors | | ~10,259 | | |
| Reform gain from Black Country Party | | | | |

=== Brockmoor & Pensnett ===
Brockmoor & Pensnett
| Party | Candidate | Votes | % | ±% |
|---|---|---|---|---|
| Reform | Joel Hyde | 1,515 | 47.2 | N/A |
| Black Country Party | Karen Westwood* | 761 | 23.7 | N/A |
| Labour | John Martin | 452 | 14.1 | –49.5 |
| Conservative | Matt Snell | 362 | 11.3 | –17.1 |
| Liberal Democrats | Jonathan Bramall | 118 | 3.7 | –4.3 |
| Majority | | 754 | 23.4 | N/A |
| Turnout | | 3,208 | 31.2 | +7.9 |
| Registered electors | | ~10,288 | | |
| Reform gain from Black Country Party | | | | |

=== Castle & Priory ===
Castle & Priory
| Party | Candidate | Votes | % | ±% |
|---|---|---|---|---|
| Reform | Jan McGeough | 1,555 | 48.0 | N/A |
| Labour | Tony Middleton | 696 | 21.5 | –24.5 |
| Green | Ant Dugmore | 377 | 11.6 | N/A |
| Conservative | Dan Dale | 357 | 11.0 | –32.0 |
| Black Country Party | Karl Denning* | 172 | 5.3 | N/A |
| Liberal Democrats | David Bramall | 84 | 2.6 | –8.4 |
| Majority | | 859 | 26.4 | N/A |
| Turnout | | 3,241 | 33.5 | +8.1 |
| Registered electors | | ~9,686 | | |
| Reform gain from Black Country Party | | | | |

=== Coseley ===
Coseley
| Party | Candidate | Votes | % | ±% |
|---|---|---|---|---|
| Reform | Sat Sherwani | 1,904 | 55.3 | N/A |
| Labour | Dave Roberts* | 712 | 20.7 | –39.0 |
| Conservative | Henry Oche | 373 | 10.8 | –16.5 |
| Green | Toni Baker | 340 | 9.9 | –3.1 |
| Liberal Democrats | Roxanne Holmes | 86 | 2.5 | N/A |
| Libertarian | Martin Day | 25 | 0.7 | N/A |
| Majority | | 1,192 | 34.5 | N/A |
| Turnout | | 3,440 | 35.6 | +11.3 |
| Registered electors | | ~9,657 | | |
| Reform gain from Labour | | | | |

=== Cradley North & Wollescote ===
Cradley North & Wollescote
| Party | Candidate | Votes | % | ±% |
|---|---|---|---|---|
| Reform | Caley Ashman | 1,271 | 36.3 | N/A |
| Liberal Democrats | Ethan Stafford* | 1,194 | 34.1 | –15.0 |
| Labour | Matt Collins | 382 | 10.9 | –19.9 |
| Green | Bridget Hilton | 256 | 7.3 | N/A |
| Conservative | Eric Perry | 220 | 6.3 | –11.2 |
| Independent | Abdul Qadus | 183 | 5.2 | N/A |
| Majority | | 77 | 2.2 | N/A |
| Turnout | | 3,506 | 38.0 | +4.6 |
| Registered electors | | ~9,224 | | |
| Reform gain from Liberal Democrats | | | | |

=== Gornal ===
Gornal
| Party | Candidate | Votes | % | ±% |
|---|---|---|---|---|
| Reform | Chris Whitehouse | 2,532 | 60.2 | +44.7 |
| Conservative | Claire Sullivan | 854 | 20.3 | –15.3 |
| Labour | Jeff Ndlovu | 382 | 9.1 | –16.0 |
| Green | Kaz Evans | 300 | 7.1 | N/A |
| Liberal Democrats | Stephen Holmes | 140 | 3.3 | N/A |
| Majority | | 1,678 | 39.7 | N/A |
| Turnout | | 4,208 | 42.4 | +12.0 |
| Registered electors | | ~9,920 | | |
| Reform gain from Independent | | Swing | ▲30.0 | |

=== Halesowen North ===
Halesowen North
| Party | Candidate | Votes | % | ±% |
|---|---|---|---|---|
| Conservative | Stuart Henley* | 1,347 | 34.4 | –2.2 |
| Labour | Fiona Murray | 1,182 | 30.2 | –14.5 |
| Reform | Aveena Sherwani | 792 | 20.2 | N/A |
| Green | Ash Flavin | 482 | 12.3 | +4.8 |
| Liberal Democrats | Tracey Gregg | 114 | 2.9 | –1.2 |
| Majority | | 165 | 4.2 | N/A |
| Turnout | | 3,917 | 40.4 | +5.0 |
| Registered electors | | ~9,691 | | |
| Conservative hold | | Swing | ▲6.2 | |

=== Halesowen South ===
Halesowen South
| Party | Candidate | Votes | % | ±% |
|---|---|---|---|---|
| Reform | Andrew Barnfield | 1,684 | 37.7 | N/A |
| Conservative | Thomas Russon* | 1,287 | 28.8 | –19.3 |
| Labour | Michael Hanley | 770 | 17.2 | –14.1 |
| Green | James Windridge | 526 | 11.8 | –2.8 |
| Liberal Democrats | Caroline Benton | 199 | 4.5 | –1.5 |
| Majority | | 397 | 8.9 | N/A |
| Turnout | | 4,466 | 47.36 | +9.51 |
| Registered electors | | ~9,430 | | |
| Reform gain from Conservative | | | | |

=== Hayley Green & Cradley South ===
Hayley Green & Cradley South
| Party | Candidate | Votes | % | ±% |
|---|---|---|---|---|
| Reform | Jon Mucklow | 1,573 | 39.4 | N/A |
| Conservative | Bex Collins* | 1,255 | 31.4 | –22.1 |
| Labour | Julian Hammond-Miller | 609 | 15.3 | –22.9 |
| Green | Zach Beed | 381 | 9.5 | N/A |
| Liberal Democrats | Alison Hunt | 173 | 4.3 | –4.0 |
| Majority | | 318 | 8.0 | N/A |
| Turnout | | 3,991 | 43.5 | +8.7 |
| Registered electors | | ~9,183 | | |
| Reform gain from Conservative | | | | |

=== Kingswinford North & Wall Heath ===
Kingswinford North & Wall Heath
| Party | Candidate | Votes | % | ±% |
|---|---|---|---|---|
| Conservative | Mark Webb* | 1,983 | 41.1 | –1.8 |
| Reform | Stephen Cole | 1,913 | 39.7 | N/A |
| Labour | Jacqueline Foster | 456 | 9.5 | –9.8 |
| Green | Ninette Harris | 318 | 6.6 | N/A |
| Liberal Democrats | Charlie Passmore | 150 | 3.1 | –1.1 |
| Majority | | 70 | 1.4 | N/A |
| Turnout | | 4,820 | 50.4 | +11.0 |
| Registered electors | | ~9,565 | | |
| Conservative hold | | | | |

=== Kingswinford South ===
Kingswinford South
| Party | Candidate | Votes | % | ±% |
|---|---|---|---|---|
| Reform | Graham Howes | 1,888 | 42.6 | N/A |
| Conservative | Luke Johnson* | 1,415 | 31.9 | –10.2 |
| Labour | Simon Daniel | 525 | 11.8 | –18.8 |
| Green | Dom Palermo | 430 | 9.7 | +3.3 |
| Liberal Democrats | Simon Hanson | 173 | 3.9 | +0.6 |
| Majority | | 473 | 10.7 | N/A |
| Turnout | | 4,431 | 44.8 | +10.1 |
| Registered electors | | ~9,888 | | |
| Reform gain from Conservative | | | | |

=== Lye & Stourbridge North ===
Lye & Stourbridge North
| Party | Candidate | Votes | % | ±% |
|---|---|---|---|---|
| Reform | Lisa Clinton | 1,348 | 38.8 | N/A |
| Labour | Ellen Cobb* | 695 | 20.0 | –20.6 |
| Liberal Democrats | Naz Ahmed | 477 | 13.7 | –5.5 |
| Conservative | Julia Savage | 448 | 12.9 | –18.1 |
| Green | Danny Hussain | 342 | 9.8 | +0.7 |
| Black Country Party | Matt Cook | 163 | 4.7 | N/A |
| Majority | | 653 | 18.7 | N/A |
| Turnout | | 3,473 | 36.6 | +2.6 |
| Registered electors | | ~9,497 | | |
| Reform gain from Labour | | | | |

=== Netherton & Holly Hall ===
Netherton & Holly Hall
| Party | Candidate | Votes | % | ±% |
|---|---|---|---|---|
| Reform | Jack Thompson | 1,622 | 49.7 | N/A |
| Labour | Shaneila Mughal* | 691 | 21.2 | –29.1 |
| Green | Manjit Kaur | 423 | 13.0 | –1.8 |
| Conservative | James Tye | 375 | 11.5 | –14.2 |
| Liberal Democrats | Richard Priest | 150 | 4.6 | –4.6 |
| Majority | | 931 | 28.3 | N/A |
| Turnout | | 3,261 | 32.0 | +6.0 |
| Registered electors | | ~10,207 | | |
| Reform gain from Labour | | | | |

=== Norton ===
Norton
| Party | Candidate | Votes | % | ±% |
|---|---|---|---|---|
| Reform | Phil Boaler | 1,691 | 35.4 | N/A |
| Conservative | Alan Hopwood* | 1,350 | 28.3 | –19.3 |
| Green | Stephen Price | 1,030 | 21.6 | +3.3 |
| Labour | Matt Broad | 492 | 10.3 | –17.2 |
| Liberal Democrats | Lee Furness | 215 | 4.5 | –2.2 |
| Majority | | 341 | 7.1 | N/A |
| Turnout | | 4,778 | 52.0 | +10.1 |
| Registered electors | | ~9,194 | | |
| Reform gain from Conservative | | | | |

=== Pedmore & Stourbridge East ===
Pedmore & Stourbridge East
| Party | Candidate | Votes | % | ±% |
|---|---|---|---|---|
| Reform | Jason Thorne | 1,482 | 32.6 | N/A |
| Conservative | Dave Borley | 1,370 | 30.1 | –15.6 |
| Liberal Democrats | Nigel Kirkham | 638 | 14.0 | –1.7 |
| Labour | Mark Kent | 560 | 12.3 | –16.5 |
| Green | Beth Scrimshaw | 496 | 10.9 | +1.0 |
| Majority | | 112 | 2.5 | N/A |
| Turnout | | 4,546 | 49.0 | +6.8 |
| Registered electors | | ~9,270 | | |
| Reform hold | | | | |

=== Quarry Bank & Dudley Wood ===
Quarry Bank and Dudley Wood
| Party | Candidate | Votes | % | ±% |
|---|---|---|---|---|
| Reform | Rob Clinton | 1,891 | 56.9 | N/A |
| Labour Co-op | Jules Singh | 489 | 14.7 | –34.4 |
| Green | Simon Ballinger | 400 | 12.0 | N/A |
| Conservative | Errol Lawson | 386 | 11.6 | –28.6 |
| Liberal Democrats | Faye Stafford | 160 | 4.8 | –6.0 |
| Majority | | 1,402 | 42.0 | N/A |
| Turnout | | 3,326 | 33.9 | +9.2 |
| Registered electors | | ~9,814 | | |
| Reform gain from Labour | | | | |

=== Sedgley ===
Sedgley
| Party | Candidate | Votes | % | ±% |
|---|---|---|---|---|
| Reform | Shaun Keasey* | 2,664 | 55.9 | N/A |
| Conservative | Bill Etheridge | 1,002 | 21.0 | –18.9 |
| Labour | Tremaine Herbert | 505 | 10.6 | –12.0 |
| Green | Colin Drewery | 432 | 9.1 | –1.1 |
| Liberal Democrats | John Slim | 166 | 3.5 | N/A |
| Majority | | 1,662 | 34.8 | N/A |
| Turnout | | 4,769 | 45.0 | +11.7 |
| Registered electors | | ~10,607 | | |
| Reform hold | | | | |

=== St James’s ===
St James’s
| Party | Candidate | Votes | % | ±% |
|---|---|---|---|---|
| Reform | Ivor Robinson | 1,630 | 48.9 | +35.8 |
| Labour | Caroline Reid* | 727 | 21.8 | –21.0 |
| Conservative | Carole Blackmore | 462 | 13.9 | –16.3 |
| Green | Katherine Poole | 355 | 10.6 | +2.8 |
| Liberal Democrats | Mollie Priest | 130 | 3.9 | –2.3 |
| TUSC | David Reynolds | 30 | 0.9 | N/A |
| Majority | | 903 | 27.0 | N/A |
| Turnout | | 3,334 | 32.9 | +4.3 |
| Registered electors | | ~10,146 | | |
| Reform gain from Labour | | Swing | ▲28.4 | |

=== St Thomas’s ===
St Thomas's
| Party | Candidate | Votes | % | ±% |
|---|---|---|---|---|
| Labour | Adeela Qayyum* | 1,415 | 37.1 | –9.4 |
| Reform | Chris Chivers | 1,224 | 32.1 | N/A |
| Green | Zia Ur Rehman Qari | 399 | 10.5 | +4.7 |
| Independent | Shakeela Bibi | 358 | 9.4 | –10.2 |
| Conservative | Muhammad Najeeb | 295 | 7.7 | –10.1 |
| Liberal Democrats | Rob Johns | 120 | 3.1 | –2.7 |
| Majority | | 191 | 5.0 | N/A |
| Turnout | | 3,811 | 35.8 | +2.5 |
| Registered electors | | ~10,657 | | |
| Labour hold | | | | |

=== Upper Gornal & Woodsetton ===
Upper Gornal & Woodsetton
| Party | Candidate | Votes | % | ±% |
|---|---|---|---|---|
| Reform | Marco Longhi | 2,533 | 64.9 | +47.7 |
| Labour | Mushtaq Hussain* | 506 | 13.0 | –36.9 |
| Conservative | Zoe Bradley | 429 | 11.0 | –15.9 |
| Green | Charlie Hilken | 320 | 8.2 | N/A |
| Liberal Democrats | Elaine Sheppard | 115 | 2.9 | –3.1 |
| Majority | | 2,027 | 51.8 | N/A |
| Turnout | | 3,903 | 39.91 | +11.76 |
| Registered electors | | ~9,780 | | |
| Reform gain from Labour | | Swing | ▲42.3 | |

=== Wollaston & Stourbridge Town ===
Wollaston & Stourbridge Town (2 seats)
| Party | Candidate | Votes | % | ±% |
|---|---|---|---|---|
| Reform | Kam Macleod | 1,464 | 30.0 | N/A |
| Reform | Andrew Southall | 1,324 | 27.1 | N/A |
| Liberal Democrats | Lois Bramall | 1,202 | 24.6 | +14.6 |
| Liberal Democrats | David Sheppard | 1,083 | 22.2 | +12.2 |
| Conservative | Richard Prosser | 894 | 18.3 | –19.7 |
| Labour | Jason Griffin* | 856 | 17.5 | –38.9 |
| Conservative | Steve Hancock | 856 | 17.5 | –14.4 |
| Labour | Marie Fields | 814 | 16.7 | –24.9 |
| Green | Linda Foster | 636 | 13.0 | +3.9 |
| Green | Ruth Battersea | 576 | 11.8 | +2.7 |
| Freedom Alliance | Ken Moore | 61 | 1.2 | –2.6 |
| Turnout | | ~4,883 | 49.04 | +7.08 |
| Registered electors | | ~9,957 | | |
| Reform gain from Labour | | | | |
| Reform gain from Labour | | | | |

The ward elected two councillors after Cat Eccles (Labour), who had also served as MP for Stourbridge since July 2024, confirmed in February 2026 that she would not seek re-election as a councillor; she had deliberately delayed standing down to avoid triggering a separate, costlier by-election, and her seat fell vacant ahead of the May 2026 poll.

=== Wordsley North ===
Wordsley North
| Party | Candidate | Votes | % | ±% |
|---|---|---|---|---|
| Reform | Samuel Hussey | 1,788 | 43.8 | N/A |
| Conservative | Matt Rogers | 1,056 | 25.9 | –25.0 |
| Labour | Keith Archer* | 554 | 13.6 | –22.8 |
| Green | Alex Hughes | 320 | 7.8 | –0.7 |
| Black Country Party | Dave Woolley | 208 | 5.1 | N/A |
| Liberal Democrats | Christopher Bramall | 153 | 3.8 | –0.5 |
| Majority | | 732 | 18.0 | N/A |
| Turnout | | 4,079 | 41.9 | +9.3 |
| Registered electors | | ~9,744 | | |
| Reform gain from Labour | | | | |

== Post-election changes ==
=== St James's by-election ===
St James's by-election: 29 October 2026
| Party | Candidate | Votes | % | ±% |
|---|---|---|---|---|
| Labour | Caroline Reid | 874 | 37.9 | +16.1 |
| Reform | Chris Chivers | 872 | 37.8 | −11.1 |
| Conservative | Sam Firmstone | 317 | 13.8 | −0.1 |
| Restore | Tristian Owens | 159 | 6.9 | N/A |
| Green | Katherine Poole | 79 | 3.4 | −7.2 |
| Majority | | 2 | 0.1 | N/A |
| Rejected ballots | | 3 | 0.1 | -0.2 |
| Turnout | | 2,304 | 22.5 | −10.4 |
| Registered electors | | | | |
| Labour gain from Reform | | Swing | +13.6 | |
