= 2023 Dudley Metropolitan Borough Council election =

2023 local election in Dudley

- 4 May 2023

24 out of 72 seats to Dudley Metropolitan Borough Council 37 seats needed for a majority
- Turnout: 27.4%

	First party	Second party	Third party
Leader	Patrick Harley	Qadar Zada	None
Party	Conservative	Labour	Independent
Last election	46 seats, 48.6%	26 seats, 42.4%	0 seats, 0.3%
Seats before	44	26	1
Seats won	44	27	1
Seat change	▼1	▲1	Steady
Percentage	42.4%	43.8%	1.5%
Swing	▼6.2%	▲1.4%	▲1.2%
- Map of the results
Leader before election
Patrick Harley
Conservative
Leader after election
Patrick Harley
Conservative

The 2023 Dudley Metropolitan Borough Council election took place on 4 May 2023. One third of councillors— 24 out of 72 —on the Dudley Metropolitan Borough Council were elected. The election was held alongside other local elections across the United Kingdom.

The Conservatives retained their majority on the council.

== Background ==
=== History ===
Result of the most recent council election in 2022

The Local Government Act 1972 created a two-tier system of metropolitan counties and districts covering Greater Manchester, Merseyside, South Yorkshire, Tyne and Wear, the West Midlands, and West Yorkshire starting in 1974. Dudley was a district of the West Midlands metropolitan county. The Local Government Act 1985 abolished the metropolitan counties, with metropolitan districts taking on most of their powers as metropolitan boroughs. The West Midlands Combined Authority was created in 2016 and began electing the mayor of the West Midlands from 2017, which was given strategic powers covering a region coterminous with the former West Midlands metropolitan county.

Dudley Council has variously been under Labour control, Conservative control and no overall control since it was established. The Conservatives controlled the council from the 2004 election until Labour gained control in the 2012 election. Labour lost overall control in the 2016 election but continued to lead the council until 2017, when the Conservatives led the council, still without a majority. In the 2021 elections, the Conservatives gained a majority on the council. In the most recent elections in 2022, the Conservatives held steady at 46 seats while Labour won 26 seats at the expense of two Independents.

Positions up for election in 2023 were last elected in 2019. In that election the Conservatives won 13 seats and Labour won 11.

In March 2023, the former council leader and mayor of Dudley Anne Millward was deselected. On 17 April 2023, Councillor Mark Westwood resigned from the Conservative Party amid allegations of bullying and harassment against his family.

=== Electoral process ===
The council elects its councillors in thirds, with a third being up for election every year for three years, with no election in the fourth year. The election will take place by first-past-the-post voting, with wards generally being represented by three councillors, with one elected in each election year to serve a four-year term.

All registered electors (British, Irish, Commonwealth and European Union citizens) living in Dudley aged 18 or over will be entitled to vote in the election. People who live at two addresses in different councils, such as university students with different term-time and holiday addresses, are entitled to be registered for and vote in elections in both local authorities. Voting in-person at polling stations will take place from 07:00 to 22:00 on election day, and voters will be able to apply for postal votes or proxy votes in advance of the election.

== Summary ==
=== Election result ===
2023 Dudley Metropolitan Borough Council election
Party	This election				Full council			This election		
Party	Candidates	Seats	Net	Seats %	Other	Total	Total %	Votes	Votes %	+/−
Labour	{{{candidates}}}	13	▲1	54.2	14	27	37.5	29,061	43.8	+1.4
Conservative	{{{candidates}}}	12	▼1	50.0	32	44	61.1	28,165	42.4	–6.2
Independent	{{{candidates}}}	0	Steady	0.0	1	1	1.39	978	1.5	+1.2
Liberal Democrats	{{{candidates}}}	0	Steady	0.0	0	0	0.0	3,859	5.8	–0.1
Green	{{{candidates}}}	0	Steady	0.0	0	0	0.0	3,506	5.3	+4.0
Reform	{{{candidates}}}	0	Steady	0.0	0	0	0.0	495	0.7	+0.6
TUSC	{{{candidates}}}	0	Steady	0.0	0	0	0.0	257	0.4	+0.1
Libertarian	{{{candidates}}}	0	Steady	0.0	0	0	0.0	89	0.1	–0.9

== Ward results ==
An asterisk indicates an incumbent councillor.

=== Amblecote ===
Amblecote (1)
Party	Candidate	Votes	%	±%
Conservative	Pete Lee*	1,341	52.14	−4.5
Labour	Luke Hamblett	935	36.35	+2.4
Liberal Democrats	Ian Flynn	159	6.18	+0.5
Green	Adrian Mabe	125	4.86	+1.1
Majority		406	15.8	−7.0
Rejected ballots		12	0.5	
Turnout		2,572	26.14	−2.9
Registered electors		9,839		
Conservative hold		Swing		

=== Belle Vale ===
Belle Vale (1)
Party	Candidate	Votes	%	±%
Conservative	Simon Phipps*	1,636	54.06	+6.6
Labour	Savannah Southorn	1,150	38.0	−2.9
Green	Deanne Brettle	119	3.93	−2.1
Liberal Democrats	Sarah Furhuraire	110	3.64	−2.0
Majority		486	16.1	+9.5
Rejected ballots		11	0.4	
Turnout		3,026	30.2	−1.5
Registered electors		10,020		
Conservative hold		Swing		

=== Brierley Hill ===
Brierley Hill (1)
Party	Candidate	Votes	%	±%
Conservative	Wayne Little	1,007	44.26	+4.4
Labour	Ridha Ahmed*	927	40.75	−6.2
Green	Mark Percox	127	5.58	N/A
Reform	Trevor Bunn	107	4.7	+1.0
Liberal Democrats	Mollie Priest	97	4.26	−5.1
Majority		80	3.5	+10.6
Rejected ballots		11	0.4	
Turnout		2,276	22.6	−1.4
Registered electors		10,071		
Conservative gain from Labour		Swing		

=== Brockmoor and Pensnett ===
Brockmoor and Pensnett (1)
Party	Candidate	Votes	%	±%
Labour	Karen Westwood	1,095	58.0	−6.9
Conservative	Sue Greenaway*	601	31.83	−3.3
Reform	Austin Ward	92	4.87	N/A
Green	Lawrence Rowlett	55	2.91	N/A
Liberal Democrats	Tracey Gregg	34	1.8	N/A
Majority		494	26.2	−3.6
Rejected ballots		11	0.6	
Turnout		1,888	19.1	−4.8
Registered electors		9,884		
Labour gain from Conservative		Swing		

=== Castle and Priory ===
Castle and Priory (1)
Party	Candidate	Votes	%	±%
Labour	Karl Denning	1,330	60.18	−3.7
Conservative	Sat Nawabzada	600	27.15	−8.9
Green	Ant Dugmore	114	5.16	N/A
Liberal Democrats	David Bramall	110	4.98	N/A
TUSC	Nicola Fisher	47	2.13	N/A
Majority		730	33.0	+5.3
Rejected ballots		9	0.4	
Turnout		2,210	19.8	−4.1
Registered electors		11,161		
Labour hold		Swing		

=== Coseley East ===
Coseley East (1)
Party	Candidate	Votes	%	±%
Labour	Peter Drake*	1,130	61.78	−1.7
Conservative	Richard Tasker	465	25.42	−10.1
Green	Sam Oakley	210	11.48	N/A
Majority		665	36.4	+9.2
Rejected ballots		24	1.3	
Turnout		1,829	19.7	−3.1
Registered electors		9,284		
Labour hold		Swing		

=== Cradley and Wollescote ===
Cradley and Wollescote (1)
Party	Candidate	Votes	%	±%
Labour	Richard Body*	1,061	38.71	−0.1
Liberal Democrats	Ryan Priest	1,040	37.94	+7.1
Conservative	Jason Thorne	517	18.86	−11.5
Green	Kash Khan	89	3.25	N/A
TUSC	Siobhan Friel	24	0.88	N/A
Majority		21	0.8	−7.2
Rejected ballots		10	0.4	
Turnout		2,741	29.0	−2.5
Registered electors		9,441		
Labour hold		Swing		

=== Gornal ===
Gornal (1)
Party	Candidate	Votes	%	±%
Conservative	Claire Sullivan	930	35.47	−30.4
Independent	Anne Millward*	705	26.89	N/A
Labour	Mushtaq Hussain	606	23.11	−11.0
Reform	Nathan Hunt	176	6.71	N/A
Green	Dan Spear	99	3.78	N/A
Liberal Democrats	Elizabeth Tilly	95	3.62	N/A
Majority		225	8.6	−23.2
Rejected ballots		11	0.4	
Turnout		2,622	26.2	−2.3
Registered electors		10,008		
Conservative hold		Swing		

=== Halesowen North ===
Halesowen North (1)
Party	Candidate	Votes	%	±%
Labour	Parmjit Singh Sahota*	1,637	53.55	–3.3
Conservative	Jeff Hill	1,207	39.48	+1.7
Green	Ash Flavin	143	4.68	N/A
Liberal Democrats	Abdul Qadus	56	1.83	–3.0
Majority		430	14.1	
Rejected ballots		14	0.5	
Turnout		3,057	31.8	–2.0
Registered electors		9,613		
Labour hold		Swing		

=== Halesowen South ===
Halesowen South (1)
Party	Candidate	Votes	%	±%
Conservative	Alan Taylor*	1,661	53.86	+5.1
Labour	Donella Russell	988	32.04	+7.7
Green	James Windridge	209	6.78	–5.1
Liberal Democrats	Derek Campbell	204	6.61	–2.3
Majority		673	21.9	
Rejected ballots		22	0.7	
Turnout		3,084	32.7	–3.6
Registered electors		9,431		
Conservative hold		Swing		

=== Haley Green and Cradley South ===
Haley Green and Cradley South (1)
Party	Candidate	Votes	%	±%
Conservative	Ian Bevan	1,408	52.48	–5.0
Labour	Tony Barnsley	1,106	41.22	+5.3
Liberal Democrats	Ethan Stafford	156	5.81	–0.4
Majority		302	11.6	
Rejected ballots		13	0.5	
Turnout		2,683	29.7	–2.9
Registered electors		9,033		
Conservative hold		Swing		

=== Kingswinford North and Wall Heath ===
Kingswinford North and Wall Heath (1)
Party	Candidate	Votes	%	±%
Conservative	Mark Webb	1,885	60.28	–2.1
Labour	Michael Mitchell	894	28.59	–2.2
Green	Andrew Bennett	169	5.4	N/A
Liberal Democrats	Jonathan Bramall	154	4.92	–1.1
Majority		991	31.5	
Rejected ballots		25	0.8	
Turnout		3,127	32.6	–4.5
Registered electors		9,592		
Conservative hold		Swing		

=== Kingswinford South ===
Kingswinford South (1)
Party	Candidate	Votes	%	±%
Conservative	Peter Miller*	1,677	56.98	–1.6
Labour	Simon Daniel	1,137	38.63	+9.0
Liberal Democrats	Saima Furhuraire	107	3.64	–7.4
Majority		540	18.5	
Rejected ballots		22	0.8	
Turnout		2,943	29.8	–3.1
Registered electors		9,875		
Conservative hold		Swing		

=== Lye and Stourbridge North ===
Lye and Stourbridge North (1)
Party	Candidate	Votes	%	±%
Labour	Mohammed Hanif*	1,285	51.46	+6.6
Conservative	Shazad Mahmood	800	32.04	–3.8
Green	Naz Ahmed	207	8.29	N/A
Liberal Democrats	Robert Johns	187	7.49	–1.8
Majority		485	19.5	
Rejected ballots		18	0.7	
Turnout		2,497	27.5	–4.9
Registered electors		9,080		
Labour hold		Swing		

=== Netherton, Woodside and St. Andrew's ===
Netherton, Woodside and St. Andrew's (1)
Party	Candidate	Votes	%	±%
Labour	Qadar Zada*	1,354	62.54	+1.5
Conservative	Viorica Faraji	527	24.34	–13.8
Green	Mark Binnersley	265	12.24	N/A
Majority		827	38.5	
Rejected ballots		19	0.9	
Turnout		2,165	21.3	–3.9
Registered electors		10,164		
Labour hold		Swing		

=== Norton ===
Norton (1)
Party	Candidate	Votes	%	±%
Conservative	Steve Clark	1,596	46.41	–7.0
Labour	Madeleine Cowley	963	28.0	–3.6
Green	Stephen Price	590	17.16	+11.0
Liberal Democrats	David Sheppard	174	5.06	–3.5
Independent	Ken Moore	107	3.11	N/A
Majority		633	18.4	
Rejected ballots		9	0.3	
Turnout		3,439	37.2	–1.2
Registered electors		9,245		
Conservative hold		Swing		

=== Pedmore and Stourbridge East ===
Pedmore and Stourbridge East (1)
Party	Candidate	Votes	%	±%
Conservative	Ian Kettle*	1,798	53.32	–1.1
Labour	Jason Griffin	1,100	32.62	+1.1
Liberal Democrats	Simon Hanson	250	7.41	–3.4
Green	Catherine Maguire	197	5.84	N/A
Majority		698	20.9	
Rejected ballots		27	0.8	
Turnout		3,372	36.2	–1.2
Registered electors		9,315		
Conservative hold		Swing		

=== Quarry Bank and Dudley Wood ===
Quarry Bank and Dudley Wood (1)
Party	Candidate	Votes	%	±%
Labour	Jackie Cowell*	947	50.35	–0.9
Conservative	Muhammad Ali	640	34.02	–5.3
Liberal Democrats	Richard Priest	144	7.66	–0.8
Green	Pam Archer	131	6.96	
Majority		307	16.5	
Rejected ballots		19	1.0	
Turnout		1,881	19.2	–4.3
Registered electors		9,796		
Labour hold		Swing		

=== Sedgley ===
Sedgley (1)
Party	Candidate	Votes	%	±%
Conservative	Matt Dudley	1,566	55.79	–8.9
Labour	Joanne Morgan	845	30.1	–1.5
Green	Colin Drewery	160	5.7	N/A
Liberal Democrats	Caroline Benton	133	4.74	N/A
Independent	Brad Simms	56	2.0	N/A
Libertarian	Martin Day	31	1.1	–2.1
Majority		721	25.8	
Rejected ballots		16	0.6	
Turnout		2,807	30.2	–2.4
Registered electors		9,295		
Conservative hold		Swing		

=== St James's ===
St. James's (1)
Party	Candidate	Votes	%	±%
Labour	Cathryn Bayton*	1,209	53.54	+7.8
Conservative	Rab Rana	912	40.39	–5.8
Liberal Democrats	Benjamin France	124	5.49	–2.0
Majority		297	13.3	
Rejected ballots		13	0.6	
Turnout		2,258	22.5	–3.9
Registered electors		10,036		
Labour hold		Swing		

=== St Thomas's ===
St Thomas's (2)
Party	Candidate	Votes	%	±%
Labour	Adeela Qayyum	1,609	57.6	
Labour	Shanella Mughal*	1,556	55.7	
Conservative	Sajid Hanif	1,209	43.3	
Conservative	Najeeb Muhammad	684	24.5	
Liberal Democrats	John Slim	190	6.8	
TUSC	Lee Robertson	186	6.7	
Green	Zia Qari	155	5.5	
Rejected ballots		13	0.2	
Turnout			29.1	–2.9
Registered electors				
Labour hold				
Labour hold				

Two seats were contested here rather than the ward's usual one: alongside the ordinary contest for Shaneila Mughal's seat, the poll also filled the vacancy left by Maz Qari, who had won the other seat in 2022 and resigned before this election.

=== Upper Gornal and Woodsetton ===
Upper Gornal and Woodsetton (1)
Party	Candidate	Votes	%	±%
Labour	Adam Aston*	1,308	56.89	+4.9
Conservative	Lynette Corfield	871	37.89	–9.7
Independent	Greg Markowski	110	4.78	N/A
Majority		437	19.0	
Rejected ballots		10	0.4	
Turnout		2,299	23.6	–3.3
Registered electors		9,741		
Labour hold		Swing		

=== Wollaston and Stourbridge Town ===
Wollaston and Stourbridge Town (1)
Party	Candidate	Votes	%	±%
Labour Co-op	Andrew Tromans	1,789	47.91	–1.1
Conservative	Lisa Clinton	1,382	37.01	–3.8
Liberal Democrats	Christopher Bramall	258	6.91	+0.1
Green	Andi Mohr	239	6.4	N/A
Libertarian	Maxim Lowe	58	1.55	+0.6
Majority		407	10.9	
Rejected ballots		8	0.2	
Turnout		3,734	37.1	–3.1
Registered electors		10,064		
Labour Co-op gain from Conservative		Swing		

=== Wordsley ===
Wordsley (1)
Party	Candidate	Votes	%	±%
Conservative	Matt Rogers*	1,245	47.03	–8.0
Labour	Sarah Daniel	1,100	41.56	+4.3
Reform	Bill Harman	120	4.53	N/A
Green	Jennifer Slater-Reid	103	3.89	N/A
Liberal Democrats	Elaine Sheppard	77	2.91	–4.7
Majority		145	6.5	
Rejected ballots		2	0.1	
Turnout		2,647	27.3	–2.4
Registered electors		9,695		
Conservative hold		Swing		

== Changes 2023–2024 ==
=== By-elections ===
==== Cradley and Wollescote ====
Cradley and Wollescote: 3 August 2023
Party	Candidate	Votes	%	±%
Liberal Democrats	Ryan Priest	1,321	52.4	+14.5
Labour	Rachael Gardener	771	30.6	–8.1
Conservative	Steve Hill	353	14.0	–4.9
Green	Kash Khan	69	2.7	–0.6
TUSC	Siobhan Friel	5	0.2	–0.7
Majority		550	21.8	
Turnout		2,526	26.7	−2.3
Registered electors		9,484		
Liberal Democrats gain from Labour		Swing	+11.3	

The by-election was triggered by the death of the newly re-elected Labour councillor Richard Body on 9 May 2023, five days after the ordinary election.

==== St James's ====
St James's: 24 August 2023
Party	Candidate	Votes	%	±%
Labour	Caroline Reid	816	48.0	–5.9
Conservative	Rab Rana	719	42.3	+1.7
Independent	John Tasker	84	4.9	+4.9
Green	Christian Kiever	50	2.9	+2.9
Liberal Democrats	Abdul Qadus	32	1.9	−3.6
Majority		97	5.7	
Turnout		1,701	16.92	
Labour gain from Conservative		Swing		

The by-election was triggered by the resignation of Conservative councillor Wayne Sullivan on 12 July 2023, for personal reasons.
