= Dudley Council House =

Municipal building in Dudley, West Midlands, England

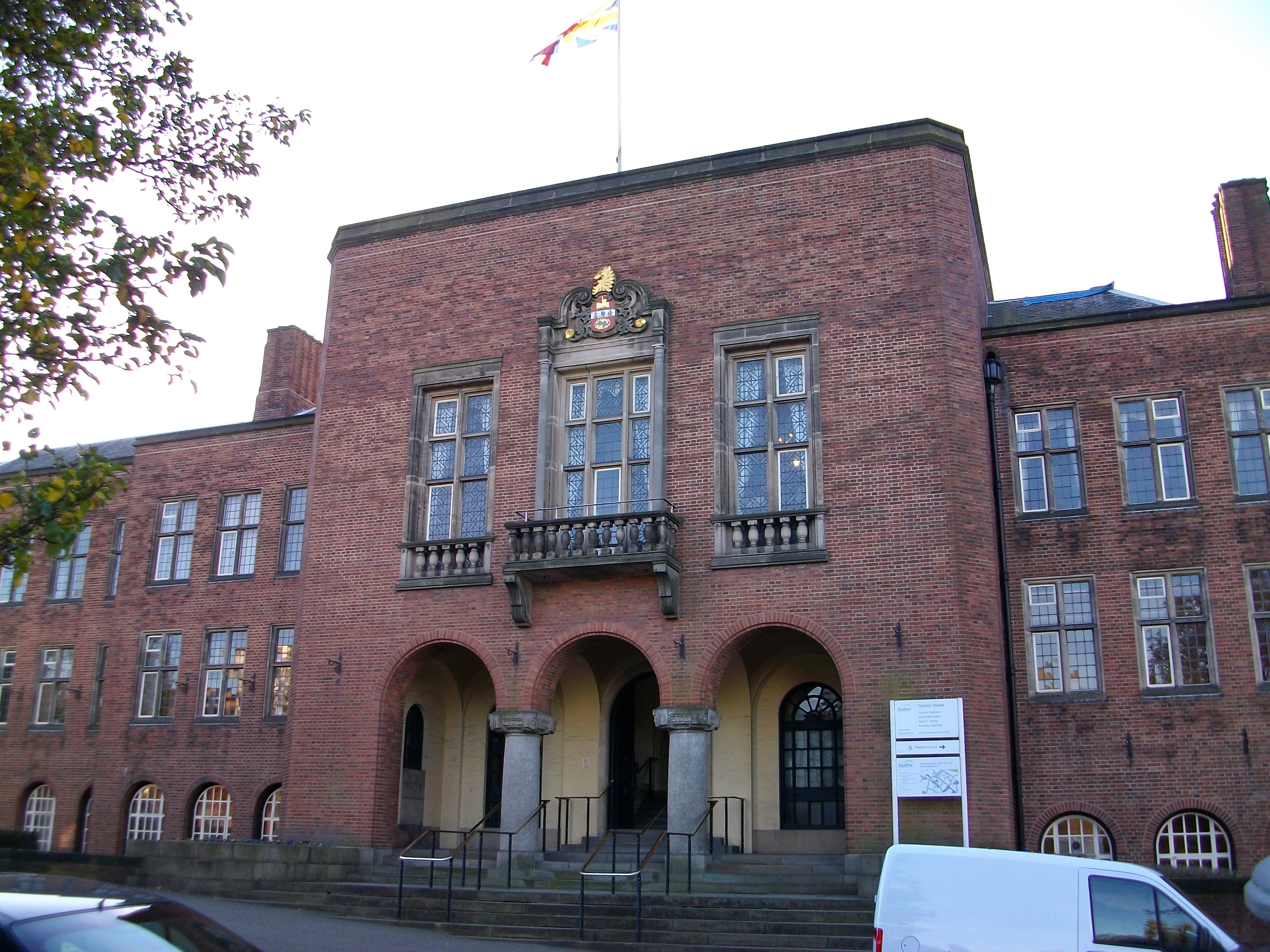
- Dudley Council House

- Shown in West Midlands
- 52.5122°N 2.0842°W
- Location: Priory Road, Dudley

History
- Built: 1935

Site notes
- Architect: Harvey and Wicks
- Architectural style: Neo-Georgian style

Listed Building – Grade II
- Official name: Council House
- Designated: 23 April 2010
- Reference no.: 1393758

Listed Building – Grade II*
- Official name: The Town Hall, Coroner's Court, Former Sessions Court and Brooke Robinson Museum
- Designated: 24 May 2010
- Reference no.: 1393884

Listed Building – Grade II
- Official name: The Old Police Buildings to the North East of the Town Hall and Former Sessions Court
- Designated: 26 April 2010
- Reference no.: 1343237

Dudley Council House is a municipal building in Priory Road, Dudley, West Midlands, England. The Council House, which is the meeting place of Dudley Metropolitan Borough Council is a Grade II listed building.

== History ==
The first town hall in Dudley was a medieval structure in the Market Place completed in 1653. It was arcaded on the ground floor, so that markets could be held, with an assembly room on the first floor and a cupola with a clock at roof level. It was demolished in 1860 and replaced with a fountain in 1867. The second town hall was built in Priory Road in the 1860s, but after the town became a county borough in 1889 and following further industrial growth in the early 20th century, civic leaders decided to procure a more substantial structure on the same site and the second town hall was demolished to make way for the current structure in 1924.

The first part of new complex was the assembly hall in St James's Road which became known as Dudley Town Hall. It was built with financial support from a legacy left by the former local member of parliament, Brooke Robinson, and his wife, Eugenia, and included several courtrooms, a museum and a memorial tower. The memorial tower was intended to commemorate the lives of local service personnel who had died in the First World War. This part of the complex was designed by Harvey and Wicks in the Neo-Georgian style, built with red brick and stone dressings and was officially opened by the Prime Minister, Stanley Baldwin, on 20 October 1928. The design involved a near-symmetrical main frontage with five bays facing onto St James's Road; the central section of three bays, which slightly projected forward, featured three arches with wrought iron gates on the ground floor and a balcony and a stained glass mullion window with the town's coat of arms in the tympanum in the central bay on the first floor. There were also stained glass mullion windows in the other bays on the first floor. The design is thought by English Heritage to be based on the Doge's Palace in Venice.

The second part of the new complex was the council house in Priory Road. It was built with financial support from Earl of Dudley, who laid the foundation stone in June 1934. It was designed by the same architect in a similar style, built with similar materials and was officially opened by the Duke of Kent in December 1935. The design involved a near-symmetrical main frontage with 22 bays facing onto Priory Road; the central section of three bays, which slightly projected forward, featured three arches on the ground floor and a balcony and a stained glass mullion window with the town's coat of arms in the tympanum in the central bay on the first floor. There were also balconies and stained glass mullion windows in the other bays on the first floor.

The old police station in Priory Street, which had been designed by Harvey Eginton and completed in 1847, was vacated when the local police service moved to a new building on New Street in 1939, and subsequently converted into additional municipal offices. Queen Elizabeth II, accompanied by the Duke of Edinburgh, visited the council house and had lunch with civic leaders on 23 April 1957. The assembly hall became a popular concert venue: performers included the band, The Who, in June 1965.

The council house continued to serve as the headquarters of the local municipal borough council and remained the local seat of government when the enlarged Dudley Metropolitan Borough Council was formed in 1974. The assembly hall was renamed Dudley Concert Hall in 2004 but, after it was found that the new name had not been widely adopted, councillors decided to revert to the name Dudley Town Hall in 2012. An extensive programme of refurbishment works to the council house costing £4 million was approved by the council in February 2020.
