= Freedom Alliance =

Freedom Alliance can refer to various political and ideological groups and movements, including:

- Freedom Alliance Party of Liberia
- United People's Freedom Alliance, a political alliance in Sri Lanka (2004–2019)
- Sri Lanka People's Freedom Alliance, a political alliance in Sri Lanka
- University of Maryland, Baltimore County, Freedom Alliance
- Freedom Alliance Party of Fiji
- Freedom Alliance, right-wing political party in Finland
