= Black Country Party =

Political party in the Black Country, UK

The Black Country Party is a local-interest "community-led" political party that opposes austerity in the United Kingdom. Its members include councillors on Dudley Metropolitan Borough Council who were previously members of an independent group of councillors.

== History ==
The party was launched on 30 May 2025 in Dudley. No by-elections were announced following the councillors joining the party. The councillors who belong to the party were previously members of an independent group of councillors, the Dudley Independent Group, which did not constitute a political party.

== Organisation ==
The party is led by Peter "Pete" Lowe, who was previously the head of the Labour group on Dudley Metropolitan Borough Council and who left the Labour Party.

The Deputy Leader is Cllr Karen Westwood who left the Labour Party alongside Cllr Karl Denning, Cllr Matt Cook, Cllr Peter Drake and Cllr Steve Edwards.

== See also ==
- List of Labour Party breakaway parties (UK)
- United Kingdom government austerity programme
