= 2012 Dudley Metropolitan Borough Council election =

2012 UK local government election

- 3 May 2012

26 out of 72 seats to Dudley Metropolitan Borough Council 37 seats needed for a majority

	First party	Second party
Party	Labour	Conservative
Last election	28 seats, 38.9%	43 seats, 59.7%
Seats before	28	43
Seats won	19	6
Seats after	41	30
Seat change	▲13	▼13
Popular vote	34,429	25,045
Percentage	43.9%	32.0%
Swing	▲3.5%	▼8.1%
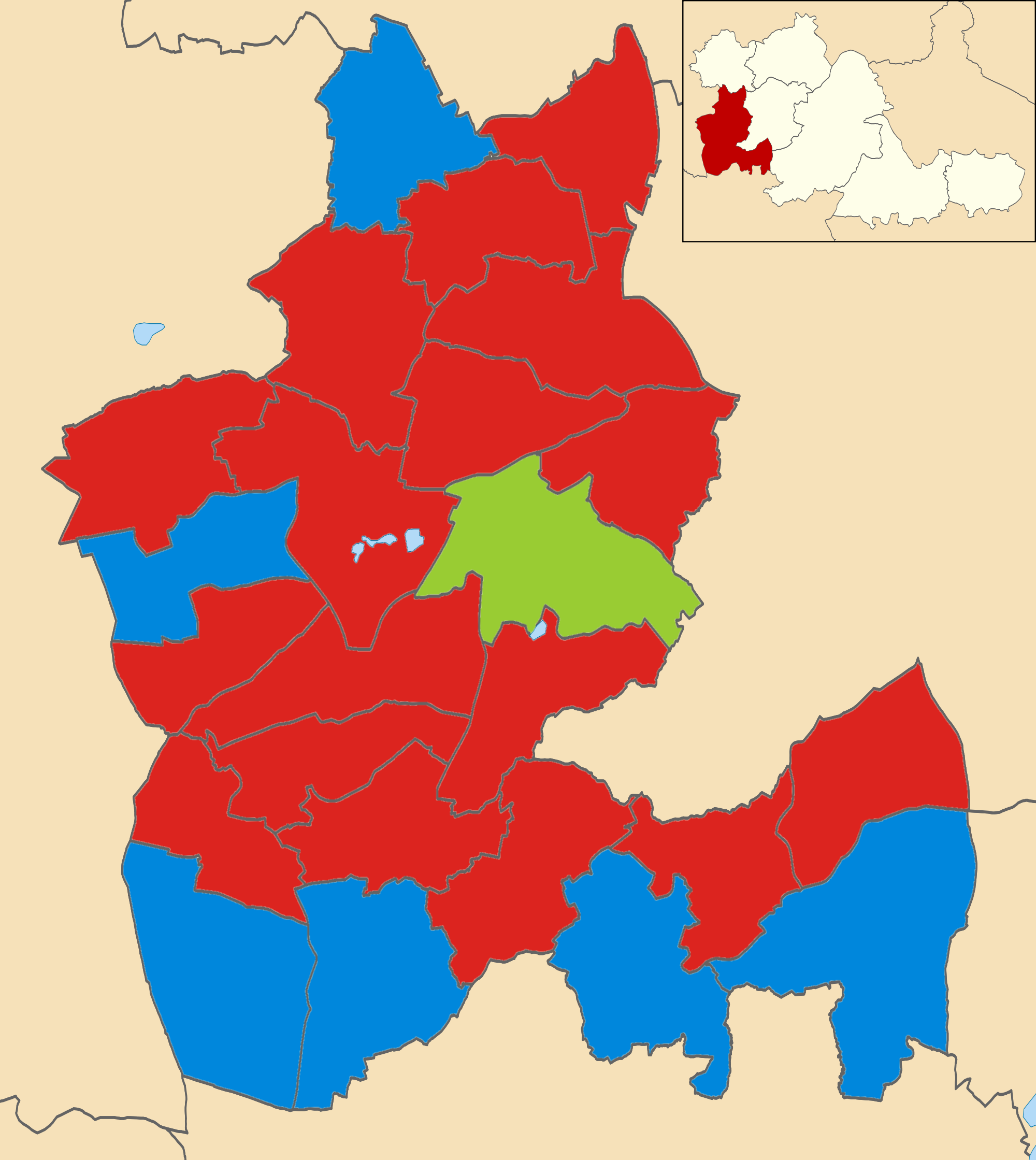
- Winner of each seat at the 2012 Dudley Metropolitan Borough Council election
Council control before election
Conservative
Council control after election
Labour

The 2012 Dudley Metropolitan Borough Council election was held on 3 May 2012 to elect members of Dudley Metropolitan Borough Council in the West Midlands, England, as part of the 2012 United Kingdom local elections. 26 seats were up for election, and the results saw the Conservatives losing to a majority of 11 seats to Labour.

== Election result ==
Dudley local election result 2012
Party	Seats	Gains	Losses	Net gain/loss	Seats %	Votes %	Votes	+/−
Labour	19	13	0	▲13	73.1	43.9	31,630	▲3.5
Conservative	6	0	13	▼13	23.1	40.1	22,827	▼8.4
UKIP	0	0	1	▼1	0.0	14.7	10,594	▼6.2
Green	1	1	0	▲1	3.8	6.7	4,829	▲2.6
Liberal Democrats	0	0	0	Steady	0.0	1.8	1,285	▼4.1
Independent	0	0	0	Steady	0.0	0.4	305	▲0.2
National Front	0	0	0	Steady	0.0	0.4	300	▲0.1
BNP	0	0	0	Steady	0.0	0.3	227	▼0.1

== Ward results ==
=== Amblecote ===
Amblecote Ward
Party	Candidate	Votes	%	±%
Labour	Christine Perks	1,049	39.5	▲16.7
Conservative	Colin Banks	932	35.1	▼15.9
UKIP	Paul Bradley	474	17.8	Steady
Green	Derek Rudd	101	3.8	new
Liberal Democrats	Susan Lucas	100	3.8	▼4.6
Majority		117	4.4	−23.7
Turnout		2,656		
Labour gain from Conservative		Swing	▲16.3	

=== Belle Vale ===
Belle Vale Ward
Party	Candidate	Votes	%	±%
Labour	Donella Russell	1,362		
Conservative	Jennie Dunn	1,044		
UKIP	Bill Roberts	361		
Green	John Payne	151		
Majority		318		
Turnout				
Labour gain from Conservative		Swing		

=== Brierley Hill ===
Brierley Hill Ward
Party	Candidate	Votes	%	±%
Labour	Margaret Wilson	1,334		
Conservative	Dan Horrocks	401		
UKIP	Stuart Larmer	365		
Green	Gordon Elcock	158		
Majority		933		
Turnout				
Labour hold		Swing		

=== Brockmore and Pensnett ===
Brockmore and Pensnett Ward
Party	Candidate	Votes	%	±%
Labour	John Martin	1,143		
Conservative	Susan Greenaway	485		
UKIP	Just Stevens	285		
Green	Vicky Duckworth	76		
Majority		658		
Turnout				
Labour gain from Conservative		Swing		

=== Castle & Priory ===
Castle & Priory Ward
Party	Candidate	Votes	%	±%
Labour	Margaret Aston	1,652		
Conservative	Simon Townend	527		
UKIP	Tim Byrne	458		
Green	Bill McComish	83		
Majority		1,125		
Turnout				
Labour hold		Swing		

=== Coseley East ===
Coseley East Ward
Party	Candidate	Votes	%	±%
Labour	George Henry Davies	1,366	54.23	
Conservative	Martin Richard Duffield	468	18.58	
UKIP	Helen Louise Wimlett	430	17.07	
National Front	Ken Griffiths	177	7.03	
Green	Becky Blatchford	71	2.82	
Majority		898		
Turnout			25.94	
Labour hold		Swing		

=== Cradley & Wollescote ===
Cradley & Wollescote Ward
Party	Candidate	Votes	%	±%
Labour	Gaye Partridge	1,741		
Conservative	Colin Elcock	474		
UKIP	Mike Hawkins	383		
Green	Karlie Owen	105		
Liberal Democrats	Lois Bramall	88		
Majority		1,267		
Turnout				
Labour hold		Swing		

=== Gornal ===
Gornal Ward
Party	Candidate	Votes	%	±%
Labour	Dave Branwood	1,409		
Conservative	David Stanley	1,336		
UKIP	Phillip Rowe	876		
Green	David Blatchford	75		
Majority		73		
Turnout				
Labour gain from Conservative		Swing		

=== Halesowen North ===
Halesowen North Ward
Party	Candidate	Votes	%	±%
Labour	Hilary Bills	1,457		
Conservative	Mike Wood	1,150		
UKIP	Stuart Henley	323		
BNP	Simon Foxall	107		
Green	Quira Blatchford	122		
Majority		307		
Turnout				
Labour gain from Conservative		Swing		

=== Halesowen South ===
Halesowen South Ward
Party	Candidate	Votes	%	±%
Conservative	David Vickers	1,489		
Labour	John Lewis	1026		
UKIP	John Marshall	495		
Green	Tim Weller	192		
Majority		463		
Turnout				
Conservative hold		Swing		

=== Hayley Green & Cradley South ===
Hayley Green & Cradley South Ward
Party	Candidate	Votes	%	±%
Conservative	Hazel Turner	1,265		
Labour	Ian Cooper	1,080		
UKIP	Bob Heeley	404		
Green	Colin Royle	146		
BNP	Robert Weale	120		
Majority		185		
Turnout				
Conservative hold		Swing		

=== Kingswinford North & Wall Heath ===
Kingswinford North & Wall Heath Ward (2 candidates)
Party	Candidate	Votes	%	±%
Labour	David Tyler	1,574		
Labour	Lynn Boleyn	1,482		
Conservative	Dee Harley	1,464		
Conservative	David Simms	1,192		
UKIP	Dean Perks	560		
UKIP	Phil Wimlett	419		
Green	Liz Jednorog	151		
Green	Francis Sheppard	87		
Majority		18		
Turnout				
Labour gain from Conservative		Swing		

=== Kingswinford South ===
Kingswinford South Ward
Party	Candidate	Votes	%	±%
Conservative	David Blood	1,588		
Labour	Shaz Saleem	1,097		
Green	Jenny Rudd	404		
Majority		491		
Turnout				
Conservative hold		Swing		

=== Lye & Stourbridge North ===
Lye & Stourbridge North Ward
Party	Candidate	Votes	%	±%
Labour	Tremaine Herbert	1,241		
Conservative	Adrian Turner	747		
UKIP	Tony Oliver	349		
Independent	Abdul Qadus	305		
Liberal Democrats	Vera Johnson	100		
Green	Denis Neville	89		
Majority		494		
Turnout				
Labour gain from Conservative		Swing		

=== Netherton, Woodside & St. Andrew's ===
Netherton, Woodside & St. Andrew's Ward
Party	Candidate	Votes	%	±%
Green	Will Duckworth	1,525		
Labour	Mahbub Rahman	1,269		
Conservative	Steven Ridley	335		
UKIP	Craig Ingram	257		
Majority		256		
Turnout				
Green gain from Conservative		Swing		

=== Norton ===
Norton Ward
Party	Candidate	Votes	%	±%
Conservative	Mike Attwood	1,570		
Labour	Michael Kelly	801		
UKIP	Paul Barton	441		
Liberal Democrats	Margaret Hanson	237		
Green	Benjamin Sweeney	215		
Majority		769		
Turnout				
Conservative hold		Swing		

=== Pedmore & Stourbridge East ===
Pedmore & Stourbridge East Ward
Party	Candidate	Votes	%	±%
Conservative	Les Jones	1,747		
Labour	Joe Gaytten	1,087		
UKIP	Lynette Wragg	386		
Liberal Democrats	Simon Hanson	204		
Green	Roy Sadler	262		
Majority		660		
Turnout			36.01	
Conservative hold		Swing		

=== Quarry Bank & Dudley Wood ===
Quarry Bank & Dudley Wood Ward
Party	Candidate	Votes	%	±%
Labour	Bryan Cotterill	1,758		
Conservative	Tim Wood	476		
Green	Pam Archer	222		
Liberal Democrats	David Sheppard	78		
Majority		1,282		
Turnout				
Labour hold		Swing		

=== Sedgley ===
Sedgley Ward
Party	Candidate	Votes	%	±%
Conservative	Michael Evans	1,383		
UKIP	Bill Etheridge	863		
Labour Co-op	Barbara Sykes	810		
Green	Donna Dodson	121		
Majority		520		
Turnout				
Conservative hold		Swing		

=== St. James's ===
St. James's Ward
Party	Candidate	Votes	%	±%
Labour	Asif Ahmed	1,321		
UKIP	Malcolm Davis	1,132		
Conservative	David Allen	396		
Green	Daniel Archer	109		
Majority		189		
Turnout				
Labour gain from UKIP		Swing		

=== St. Thomas's ===
St. Thomas's Ward
Party	Candidate	Votes	%	±%
Labour	Shaukat Ali	2,143		
UKIP	Michael Forsyth	523		
Conservative	Daryl Millward	317		
Green	Christian Green	124		
Majority		1,620		
Turnout				
Labour hold		Swing		

=== Upper Gornal & Woodsetton ===
Upper Gornal & Woodsetton Ward
Party	Candidate	Votes	%	±%
Labour	Keiran Robert Casey	1,220	44.46	
Conservative	Julian Ryder	859	31.3	
UKIP	Star Freedom Marie Etheridge	452	16.47	
National Front	Kevin Inman	123	4.48	
Green	Emma Caroline Harrison	83	3.02	
Majority		361		
Turnout			26.83	
Labour gain from Conservative		Swing		

=== Wollaston & Stourbridge Town ===
Wollaston & Stourbridge Town Ward (2 candidates)
Party	Candidate	Votes	%	±%
Labour	Chris Hale	1,397		
Labour	Ian Marrey	1,317		
Conservative	Nicolas Barlow	1,213		
Conservative	Matt Rogers	1,025		
Liberal Democrats	June Collins	478		
Liberal Democrats	Christopher Bramall	435		
UKIP	Glen Wilson	365		
UKIP	Pete Lee	353		
Green	Lawrence Rowlett	229		
Green	Jane Sheppard	164		
Majority		96		
Turnout				
Labour gain from Conservative		Swing		

=== Wordsley ===
Wordsley Ward
Party	Candidate	Votes	%	±%
Labour	Derrick Hemingsley	1,293		
Conservative	Geoffrey Southall	1,162		
UKIP	Raymond Franklin	412		
Green	Maurice Archer	115		
Liberal Democrats	Susan Lucas	100		
Majority		132		
Turnout				
Labour gain from Conservative		Swing		
