= 2021 Dudley Metropolitan Borough Council election =

2021 UK local government election

- 6 May 2021

26 out of 72 seats to Dudley Metropolitan Borough Council 37 seats needed for a majority

	First party	Second party
Leader	Patrick Harley	Qadar Zada
Party	Conservative	Labour
Last election	36 seats, 50%	36 seats, 50%
Seats before	11	14
Seats won	23	3
Seats after	46	24
Seat change	▲10	▼12
Popular vote	49,406	28,882
Percentage	57.1%	33.4%
Swing	▲17.2%	▲0.4%
- Winner of each seat at the 2021 Dudley Metropolitan Borough Council election
Council control before election
Conservative
Council control after election
Conservative

The 2021 Dudley Metropolitan Borough Council election took place on 6 May 2021 to elect members of Dudley Metropolitan Borough Council in England. This was on the same day as other local elections. One-third of the seats were up for election, with two wards (Belle Vale and Kingswinford North & Wall Heath) electing two councillors.

== Results ==
2021 Dudley Metropolitan Borough Council election
Party	This election				Full council			This election		
Party	Candidates	Seats	Net	Seats %	Other	Total	Total %	Votes	Votes %	+/−
Conservative	{{{candidates}}}	23	▲12	88.5	23	46	63.9	49,406	57.1	+17.2
Labour	{{{candidates}}}	3	▼11	11.5	21	24	33.3	28,882	33.4	+0.4
Independent	{{{candidates}}}	0	Steady	0.0	2	2	2.8	197	0.2	-0.9
Liberal Democrats	{{{candidates}}}	0	Steady	0.0	0	0	0.0	3,591	4.2	+0.8
Green	{{{candidates}}}	0	Steady	0.0	0	0	0.0	2,202	2.6	-1.6
Black Country Party	{{{candidates}}}	0	Steady	0.0	0	0	0.0	1,219	1.4	-6.5
Libertarian	{{{candidates}}}	0	Steady	0.0	0	0	0.0	404	0.5	+0.4
UKIP	{{{candidates}}}	0	▼1	0.0	0	0	0.0	241	0.3	-10.0
Reform	{{{candidates}}}	0	Steady	0.0	0	0	0.0	177	0.2	New
TUSC	{{{candidates}}}	0	Steady	0.0	0	0	0.0	118	0.1	New
SDP	{{{candidates}}}	0	Steady	0.0	0	0	0.0	71	0.1	New

== Ward results ==
=== Amblecote ===
Amblecote
Party	Candidate	Votes	%	±%
Conservative	Kamran Razzaq	1,950	57.98	▲27.38
Labour	Ellen Cobb	1,044	31.04	▼2.85
Green	Adrian Mabe	123	3.66	N/A
Liberal Democrats	Ian Flynn	119	3.54	▼2.33
Independent	Jake Woodley	111	3.30	N/A
Majority		906	26.94	
Turnout		3,363	33.49	▲7.43
Rejected ballots		16	0.48	
Conservative gain from Labour		Swing		

=== Belle Vale ===
Belle Vale (2 seats)
Party	Candidate	Votes	%	±%
Conservative	Daniel Bevan	2,058	57.60	
Conservative	Peter Dobb	1,779	49.79	
Labour	Savannah Southorn	1,234	34.54	
Labour	Andrew Tromans	976	27.32	
Green	Bill McComish	290	8.12	
Liberal Democrats	Marjorie Pounder	131	3.67	
Majority		545	8.39	
Turnout		3,600	35.05	▲1.42
Rejected ballots		27	0.42	
Conservative hold		Swing		

Two seats were contested here rather than the ward's usual one: the seat due for ordinary election in 2020 was not filled that year because the COVID-19 pandemic led to the nationwide postponement of the May 2020 English local elections, so it was instead contested alongside the ward's regular 2021 seat. The 2020-cycle seat also covered the vacancy left by Jake Cooper, who had won the seat from Labour in 2018 and resigned before 2021.

=== Brierley Hill ===
Brierley Hill
Party	Candidate	Votes	%	±%
Conservative	Adam Davies	1,692	58.30	▲38.40
Labour	Serena Craigie	1,011	34.84	▼11.77
Reform	Trevor Bunn	97	3.34	N/A
Liberal Democrats	Clare Bramall	84	2.89	N/A
Majority		681	23.47	
Turnout		2,902	28.44	▲6.60
Rejected ballots		18	0.62	
Conservative gain from Labour		Swing		

=== Brockmoor and Pensnett ===
Brockmoor and Pensnett
Party	Candidate	Votes	%	±%
Conservative	Rebbekah Collins	1,207	45.04	▲18.39
Labour	John Martin	919	34.29	▼14.12
Black Country Party	Steve Edwards	546	20.37	N/A
Majority		288	10.75	
Turnout		2,680	27.08	▲4.79
Rejected ballots		8	0.30	
Conservative gain from Labour		Swing		

=== Castle and Priory ===
Castle and Priory
Party	Candidate	Votes	%	±%
Labour	Margaret Aston	1,469	48.32	▼8.35
Conservative	Mark Webb	1,430	47.04	▲27.91
Liberal Democrats	Liz Tilly	116	3.82	N/A
Majority		39	1.28	
Turnout		3,040	26.35	▲4.26
Rejected ballots		25	0.82	
Labour hold		Swing		

=== Coseley East ===
Coseley East
Party	Candidate	Votes	%	±%
Labour	Sue Ridney	1,330	52.63	
Conservative	Lynette Corfield	1,068	42.26	
UKIP	Helen Wimlett	116	4.59	
Majority		262		
Turnout		2,527	26.66	▲1.13
Rejected ballots		13	0.51	
Labour hold		Swing		

=== Cradley and Wollescote ===
Cradley and Wollescote
Party	Candidate	Votes	%	±%
Conservative	Natalie Neale	1,395	43.66	
Labour	Gaye Partridge	1,232	38.56	
Liberal Democrats	Ryan Priest	346	10.83	
Black Country Party	Sarah Smith	199	6.23	
Majority		163		
Turnout		3,195	33.01	▲3.83
Rejected ballots		23	0.72	
Conservative gain from Labour		Swing		

=== Gornal ===
Gornal
Party	Candidate	Votes	%	±%
Conservative	David Stanley	2,362	67.82	
Labour	Marian Howard	877	25.18	
UKIP	Phil Wimlett	75	2.15	
SDP	Stuart Turner	71	2.04	
Liberal Democrats	Mollie Priest	68	1.95	
Majority		1,485		
Turnout		3,483	33.97	▲3.92
Rejected ballots		30	0.86	
Conservative hold		Swing		

=== Halesowen North ===
Halesowen North
Party	Candidate	Votes	%	±%
Conservative	Stuart Henley	1,906	51.03	
Labour	Hilary Bills	1,698	45.46	
Liberal Democrats	Andrew Mckay	107	2.86	
Majority		408		
Turnout		3,735	38.55	▲1.49
Rejected ballots		24	0.64	
Conservative gain from Labour		Swing		

=== Halesowen South ===
Halesowen South
Party	Candidate	Votes	%	±%
Conservative	David Vickers	2,520	63.27	
Labour	Donella Russell	910	22.85	
Green	James Windridge	230	5.77	
Liberal Democrats	Derek Campbell	159	3.99	
Black Country Party	Nick Gregory	142	3.57	
Majority		1,610		
Turnout		3,983	41.02	▲7.09
Rejected ballots		22	0.55	
Conservative hold		Swing		

=== Hayley Green and Cradley South ===
Hayley Green and Cradley South
Party	Candidate	Votes	%	±%
Conservative	Ruth Buttery	2,158	65.63	
Labour	Tony Barnsley	838	25.49	
Liberal Democrats	Ethan Stafford	191	5.81	
Green	John Payne	78	2.37	
Majority		1,320		
Turnout		3,288	35.86	▲4.21
Rejected ballots		23	0.70	
Conservative hold		Swing		

=== Kingswinford North and Wall Heath ===
Kingswinford North and Wall Heath
Party	Candidate	Votes	%	±%
Conservative	Phil Atkins	2,358	57.9	
Conservative	Shaz Saleem	1,872	46.0	
Labour	Adam Woodhall	1,132	27.8	
Labour	Richard Lloyd	1,066	26.2	
Liberal Democrats	David Sheppard	283	6.9	
Majority		740		
Turnout			41.88	
Rejected ballots		31	0.46	
Conservative hold		Swing		
Conservative gain from Labour		Swing		

Two seats were contested here rather than the ward's usual one: the seat due for ordinary election in 2020 was not filled that year because the COVID-19 pandemic led to the nationwide postponement of the May 2020 English local elections, so it was instead contested alongside the ward's regular 2021 seat. The 2020-cycle seat also covered the vacancy left by Nicola Richards, who had held it since 2015 and resigned from the council after being elected as MP for West Bromwich East in December 2019.

=== Kingswinford South ===
Kingswinford South
Party	Candidate	Votes	%	±%
Conservative	Luke Johnson	2,465	66.55	
Labour	Daniel Round	771	20.82	
Liberal Democrats	Elizabeth Geeves	434	11.72	
Majority		1,694		
Turnout		3,704	36.99	▲8.09
Rejected ballots		34	0.92	
Conservative hold		Swing		

=== Lye and Stourbridge North ===
Lye and Stourbridge North
Party	Candidate	Votes	%	±%
Conservative	Dave Borley	1,426	44.04	
Labour	Maz Qari	1,116	34.47	
Libertarian	Gary Farmer	273	8.43	
Liberal Democrats	Abdul Qadus	239	7.38	
Green	Lawrence Rowlett	159	4.91	
Majority		310		
Turnout		3,238	35.28	▲5.13
Rejected ballots		25	0.77	
Conservative gain from Labour		Swing		

=== Netherton Woodside and St Andrew's ===
Netherton Woodside and St Andrew's
Party	Candidate	Votes	%	±%
Conservative	Damian Corfield	1,329	48.07	
Labour	Helen Betts-Patel	1,178	42.60	
Green	Alexander Wright	172	6.22	
Liberal Democrats	Tracey Gregg	65	2.35	
Majority		151		
Turnout		2,765	27.48	▲1.60
Rejected ballots		21	0.76	
Conservative gain from Labour		Swing		

=== Norton ===
Norton
Party	Candidate	Votes	%	±%
Conservative	Laura Taylor	2,660	62.16	
Labour	Paul White	829	19.37	
Green	Pam Archer	378	8.83	
Liberal Democrats	Christopher Bramall	295	6.89	
Independent	Tim Woodley	86	2.01	
Majority		1,831		
Turnout		4,279	45.00	▲6.20
Rejected ballots		31	0.72	
Conservative hold		Swing		

=== Pedmore and Stourbridge East ===
Pedmore and Stourbridge East
Party	Candidate	Votes	%	±%
Conservative	James Clinton	2,713	62.44	
Labour	Rachel Tudor	1,054	24.26	
Green	Catherine Maguire	235	5.41	
Liberal Democrats	Simon Hanson	188	4.33	
Black Country Party	Glen Wilson	133	3.06	
Majority		1,659		
Turnout		4,345	45.19	▲9.34
Rejected ballots		22	0.51	
Conservative hold		Swing		

=== Quarry Bank and Dudley Wood ===
Quarry Bank and Dudley Wood
Party	Candidate	Votes	%	±%
Conservative	Rob Clinton	1,528	58.08	
Labour	Brian Roe	912	34.66	
Green	Jason Sprintall	121	4.6	
Liberal Democrats	Richard Priest	50	1.9	
Majority		616		
Turnout		2,631	26.08	▲3.96
Rejected ballots		20	0.76	
Conservative gain from Labour		Swing		

=== Sedgley ===
Sedgley
Party	Candidate	Votes	%	±%
Conservative	Michael Evans	2,530	73.02	
Labour	Steve Beardsmore	779	22.48	
Libertarian	Martin Day	131	3.78	
Majority		1,751		
Turnout		3,465	36.35	▲8.45
Rejected ballots		25	0.72	
Conservative hold		Swing		

=== St James's ===
St James's
Party	Candidate	Votes	%	±%
Conservative	Wayne Sullivan	1,471	53.28	
Labour	Asif Ahmed	1,084	39.26	
Liberal Democrats	Alison Miller	179	6.48	
Majority		387		
Turnout		2,761	27.21	▲3.68
Rejected ballots		27	0.98	
Conservative gain from Labour		Swing		

=== St Thomas's ===
St Thomas's
Party	Candidate	Votes	%	±%
Labour	Shaukat Ali	1,853	50.81	
Conservative	Sajid Hanif	1,490	40.86	
Liberal Democrats	Sofie Harris	153	4.2	
TUSC	Nicola Fisher	118	3.24	
Majority		363		
Turnout		3,647	34.80	▲7.11
Rejected ballots		33	0.90	
Labour hold		Swing		

=== Upper Gornal and Woodsetton ===
Upper Gornal and Woodsetton
Party	Candidate	Votes	%	±%
Conservative	Mark Westwood	1,397	47.99	
Labour	Keiran Casey	1,313	45.10	
Reform	Andy Griffin	80	2.75	
UKIP	Rich Colley	50	1.72	
Liberal Democrats	Benjamin Perry	43	1.48	
Majority		84		
Turnout		2,911	29.47	▲3.34
Rejected ballots		28	0.96	
Conservative gain from Labour		Swing		

=== Wollaston and Stourbridge Town ===
Wollaston and Stourbridge Town
Party	Candidate	Votes	%	±%
Conservative	Alan Hopwood	2,176	48.64	
Labour	Cat Eccles	1,678	37.51	
Green	Andi Mohr	237	5.3	
Black Country Party	Maxim Lowe	200	4.47	
Liberal Democrats	Jonathan Bramall	164	3.67	
Majority		498	11.1	
Turnout		4,474	44.39	▲6.57
Rejected ballots		19	0.42	
Conservative hold		Swing		

=== Wordsley ===
Wordsley
Party	Candidate	Votes	%	±%
Conservative	Kerry Lewis	2,466	71.90	
Labour	Muhammad Ikhlaq	579	16.88	
Green	Jennifer Slater-Reid	179	5.22	
Liberal Democrats	Elaine Sheppard	177	5.16	
Majority		1,887	55.5	N/A
Turnout		3,430	35.06	▲8.54
Rejected ballots		29	0.85	
Conservative gain from UKIP		Swing		

== Changes 2021–2022 ==
- March 2022: Brierley Hill councillor Zafar Islam was suspended by the Labour Party for six months following an internal disciplinary investigation into social media posts, after the Labour Against Antisemitism campaign submitted a complaint against him in September 2021.
