= 2016 Dudley Metropolitan Borough Council election =

2016 local election in England

- 5 May 2016

25 out of 72 seats to Dudley Metropolitan Borough Council 37 seats needed for a majority

	First party	Second party
Leader	Patrick Harley	Pete Lowe
Party	Conservative	Labour
Last election	24 seats, 56.9%	24 seats, 33.5%
Seats before	24	23
Seats won	14	12
Seats after		26
Seat change	Steady	▲2
Popular vote	36,015	31,452
Percentage	48.6%	42.4%
Swing	▼8.3%	▲8.9%
- Winner of each seat at the 2022 Dudley Metropolitan Borough Council election
Council control before election
Labour
Council control after election
No overall control

The 2016 Dudley Metropolitan Borough Council election took place on 5 May 2016 to elect a third of the members of Dudley Metropolitan Borough Council in England. This was on the same day as other local elections.

== Result ==
Dudley Metropolitan Borough Council election result, 2018
Party	Candidates						Votes		
Party	Stood	Elected	Gained	Unseated	Net	% of total	%	No.	Net %
Labour	25	14	1	4	▼3	56.0	38.4	29,260	
Conservative	25	10	3	0	▲3	40.0	33.8	25,716	
UKIP	23	1	1	0	▲1	4.0	22.5	17,160	
Green	18	0	0	1	▼1	0.0	3.6	2,753	
Liberal Democrats	5	0	0	0	Steady	0.0	1.4	1,084	
Independent	1	0	0	1	▼1	0.0	0.0	51	
TUSC	1	0	0	0	Steady	0.0	0.0	15	
Totals	92	24				100.0	100.0	76,039	

== Council seats Results ==
The table below shows a summary of the make-up of the City Council before the 5 May 2016 elections.

Party	Number of seats Previous	Number of seats After
Conservative	24	29
Labour	38	35
Liberal Democrat	0	0
Green Party	1	0
Independent	1	0
UKIP	7	8
TUSC	0	0
Total	72	72

== Ward Results ==
*Incumbent Candidate

=== Amblecote ===
Amblecote Ward
Party	Candidate	Votes	%
Labour	Julie Elizabeth Baines	959	33.89
Conservative	Asan Mishaq	866	30.60
UKIP	Pete Lee	828	29.26
Liberal Democrats	Ian Martin Flynn	166	5.87
Turnout		2,830	27.05
Rejected ballots		11	0.39
Labour hold			

=== Belle Vale ===
Belle Vale Ward
Party	Candidate	Votes	%
Conservative	Laura May Taylor	1,432	44.83
Labour	Donella Joy Russell*	1,419	44.43
Green	Jon Jak Hartless	302	9.46
Turnout		3,194	30.31
Rejected ballots		41	1.28
Conservative gain from Labour			

=== Brierley Hill ===
Brierley Hill Ward
Party	Candidate	Votes	%
Labour	Serena Craige	1,094	46.61
UKIP	Rich Colley	668	28.46
Conservative	Ceri Denise Davies	467	19.90
Green	Gordon Christopher Elcock	108	4.60
Turnout		2,347	23.21
Rejected ballots		10	0.43
Labour hold			

=== Brockmoor & Pensnett ===
Brockmoor & Pensnett Ward
Party	Candidate	Votes	%
Labour	John Martin*	1,108	48.41
Conservative	Sue Greenway	610	26.65
UKIP	Marcia Vera Harris	495	21.63
Green	Benjamin Daniel Sweeney	67	2.93
Turnout		2,289	23.36
Rejected ballots		9	0.39
Labour hold			

=== Castle & Priory ===
Castle & Priory Ward
Party	Candidate	Votes	%
Labour	Margaret Patricia Aston*	1,609	56.67
UKIP	Tony Davies	678	23.88
Conservative	Clive Ernest Whatling	543	19.13
Turnout		2,839	24.98
Rejected ballots		9	0.32
Labour hold			

=== Coseley East ===
Coseley East Ward
Party	Candidate	Votes	%
Labour	Sue Ridney	1,183	44.06
UKIP	Craig Peter Winyard	825	30.73
Conservative	Martin Richard Duffield	661	24.62
Turnout		2,685	27.70
Rejected ballots		16	0.60
Labour hold			

=== Cradley & Wollescote ===
Cradley & Wollescote Ward
Party	Candidate	Votes	%
Labour	Gaye Louisa Partridge*	1,478	52.45
UKIP	Mitchell David Bolton	685	24.31
Conservative	Phil Naylor	529	18.77
Green	Daniel Simon Archer	109	3.87
Turnout		2,818	28.47
Rejected ballots		17	0.60
Labour hold			

=== Gornal ===
Gornal Ward
Party	Candidate	Votes	%
Conservative	David John Stanley	1,283	35.68
Labour	Dave Branwood*	1,256	34.93
UKIP	Brian Thomas Brookes	988	27.47
Green	Ryan James Virgo	58	1.61
Turnout		3,596	34.00
Rejected ballots		11	0.31
Conservative gain from Labour			

=== Halesowen North ===
Halesowen North Ward
Party	Candidate	Votes	%
Labour	Hilary Freda Bills	1,384	42.32
Conservative	Johnathan Andrew Elliot	1,098	33.58
UKIP	Nathan Paul Hunt	623	19.05
Green	John Payne	150	4.59
Turnout		3,270	34.20
Rejected ballots		15	0.46
Labour hold			

=== Halesowen South ===
Halesowen South Ward
Party	Candidate	Votes	%
Conservative	David Ian Anthony Vickers*	1,797	53.28
Labour	Mark Jon Russell	903	26.77
UKIP	Nicola Claire Taylor	487	14.44
Green	Jenny Maxwell	162	4.80
Turnout		3,373	34.02
Rejected ballots		24	0.71
Conservative hold			

=== Hayley Green & Cradley South ===
Hayley Green & Cradley South Ward
Party	Candidate	Votes	%
Conservative	Ruth Natasha Buttery	1,457	48.34
Labour	Malcom David Freeman	847	28.10
UKIP	Jennifer Hill	545	18.08
Green	Colin Royle	151	5.01
Turnout		3,014	32.21
Rejected ballots		14	0.46
Conservative hold			

=== Kingswinford North & Wall Heath ===
Kingswinford North & Cradley South Ward
Party	Candidate	Votes	%
Labour	David Richard Tyler*	1,549	44.73
Conservative	Donna Barras	1,342	38.75
UKIP	David Michael Ralph	558	16.11
Turnout		3,463	34.13
Rejected ballots		14	0.40
Labour hold			
Labour loss (seat eliminated)			

=== Kingswinford South ===
Kingswinford South Ward
Party	Candidate	Votes	%
Conservative	Luke Clyde Johnson	1,400	43.61
Labour	Shaz Saleem	846	26.36
UKIP	Lesley Michelle Ralph	803	25.02
Green	Vicky Duckworth	154	4.80
Turnout		3,210	31.32
Rejected ballots		7	0.22
Conservative hold			

=== Lye & Stourbridge North ===
Lye & Stourbridge North Ward
Party	Candidate	Votes	%
Labour	Vanessa A Wale	1,192	40.20
Conservative	Muhammad Imtiyaz Ali	980	33.05
UKIP	Wendy Ann Wilde	671	22.63
Green	Lawrence Rowlett	97	3.27
Turnout		2,965	31.56
Rejected ballots		25	0.84
Labour hold			

=== Netherton, Woodside & St. Andrews ===
Netherton, Woodside & St. Andrews Ward
Party	Candidate	Votes	%
Labour	Christine Perks	1,178	44.50
UKIP	Stephen Daniels	754	28.49
Green	William Clindinning McComish	424	16.02
Conservative	Mohammad Razzaq	275	10.39
Turnout		2,647	24.96
Rejected ballots		16	0.60
Labour gain from Green			

=== Norton ===
Norton Ward
Party	Candidate	Votes	%
Conservative	Mike Attwood*	1,857	51.73
Labour	Clive Ian Rebbeck	719	20.03
UKIP	David Jolyan Stroud Powell	482	13.43
Liberal Democrats	Christopher Ashley Bramall	300	8.36
Green	Pam Archer	219	6.10
Turnout		3,590	36.81
Rejected ballots		13	0.36
Conservative hold			

=== Pedmore & Stourbridge East ===
Pedmore & Stourbridge East Ward
Party	Candidate	Votes	%
Conservative	Les Jones*	1,951	28.91
Conservative	Angus Stuart Macpherson Lees	1,539	22.81
Labour	Jonathan Dean	813	12.05
Labour	Phil Higgins	771	11.43
UKIP	Glen Patrick Wilson	504	7.47
UKIP	Lee Johnn Sargeant	467	6.92
Liberal Democrats	Simon Paul Hanson	286	4.24
Green	Craig Dennis Littley	208	3.08
Liberal Democrats	Stephanie Dawn Mucklow	205	3.04
Turnout		2,830	27.05
Rejected ballots		4	0.06
Conservative hold			
Conservative win (new seat)			

=== Quarry Bank & Dudley Wood ===
Quarry Bank & Dudley Wood Ward
Party	Candidate	Votes	%
Labour	Bryan John Cotterill*	1,260	50.93
UKIP	Dean Horton	627	25.34
Conservative	Christopher John Blake	508	20.53
Green	Maurice Stanley Archer	56	2.26
TUSC	Adam Knight	15	0.61
Turnout		2,466	24.31
Rejected ballots		8	0.32
Labour hold			

=== Sedgley ===
Sedgley Ward
Party	Candidate	Votes	%
Conservative	Michael John Evans	1,370	39.44
UKIP	Shaun Roger Keasey	1,125	32.38
Labour	Damian Corfield	963	27.72
Turnout		3,474	27.05
Rejected ballots		16	0.46
Labour hold			

=== St. James ===
St. James Ward
Party	Candidate	Votes	%
Labour	Asif Ahmed*	1,053	42.41
UKIP	Graeme Anthony Jack Lloyd	734	29.56
Conservative	Wayne Daniel Sullivan	546	21.99
Green	Adrian Denis Crossen	81	3.26
Independent	Kevin Weston	52	2.05
Turnout		2,483	24.49
Rejected ballots		18	0.72
Labour hold			

=== St. Thomas's ===
St. Thomas's Ward
Party	Candidate	Votes	%
Labour	Shaukat Ali*	1,987	60.05
UKIP	Phil Wimlett	957	28.92
Conservative	Daryl Brian Millward	353	10.67
Turnout		3,309	32.46
Rejected ballots		12	0.36
Labour hold			

=== Upper Gornal & Woodsetton ===
Upper Gornal & Woodsetton Ward
Party	Candidate	Votes	%
Labour	Keiran Robert Casey	1,263	42.57
UKIP	Karen Louise Jones	876	29.52
Conservative	Neil Daniel Watts	710	23.93
Green	Daniel James Brookes	102	3.44
Turnout		2,967	29.04
Rejected ballots		16	0.54
Labour hold			

=== Wollaston & Stourbridge Town ===
Wollaston & Stourbridge Town Ward
Party	Candidate	Votes	%
Conservative	Alan Harry Hopwood	1,315	37.53
Labour	Chris Hale*	1,312	37.44
UKIP	Maxim Henry Berridge Lowe	545	15.55
Green	Andi Mohr	190	5.42
Liberal Democrats	Benjamin France	127	3.62
Turnout		3,504	31.95
Rejected ballots		15	0.43
Conservative gain from Labour			
Labour loss (seat eliminated)			

=== Wordsley ===
Wordsley Ward
Party	Candidate	Votes	%
UKIP	Kerry Louise Lewis	1,235	37.35
Labour	Kevin James Billingham	1,114	33.69
Conservative	Kamran Razzaq	827	25.01
Green	Catherine Mary Maguire	118	3.57
Turnout		2,830	27.05
Rejected ballots		13	0.39
UKIP gain from Labour			
