= Dudley Metropolitan Borough Council =

Local government body in England

Dudley Metropolitan Borough

Type
- Type: Metropolitan borough council

Leadership
- Mayor: Pete Lowe, Black Country Party since 28 May 2026
- Leader: Patrick Harley, Conservative since 16 May 2019
- Chief Executive: Balvinder Heran since 1 October 2024

Structure
- Seats: 72 councillors
- Graph of the party split among 72 seats.
- Political groups: Administration (27) Conservative (27) Other parties (45) Reform (21) Labour (16) Liberal Democrats (4) Black Country Party (2) Restore (1) Independent (1)

Elections
- Voting system: First past the post
- Last election: May 2026
- Next election: May 2027

Motto
- Unity and Progress

Meeting place
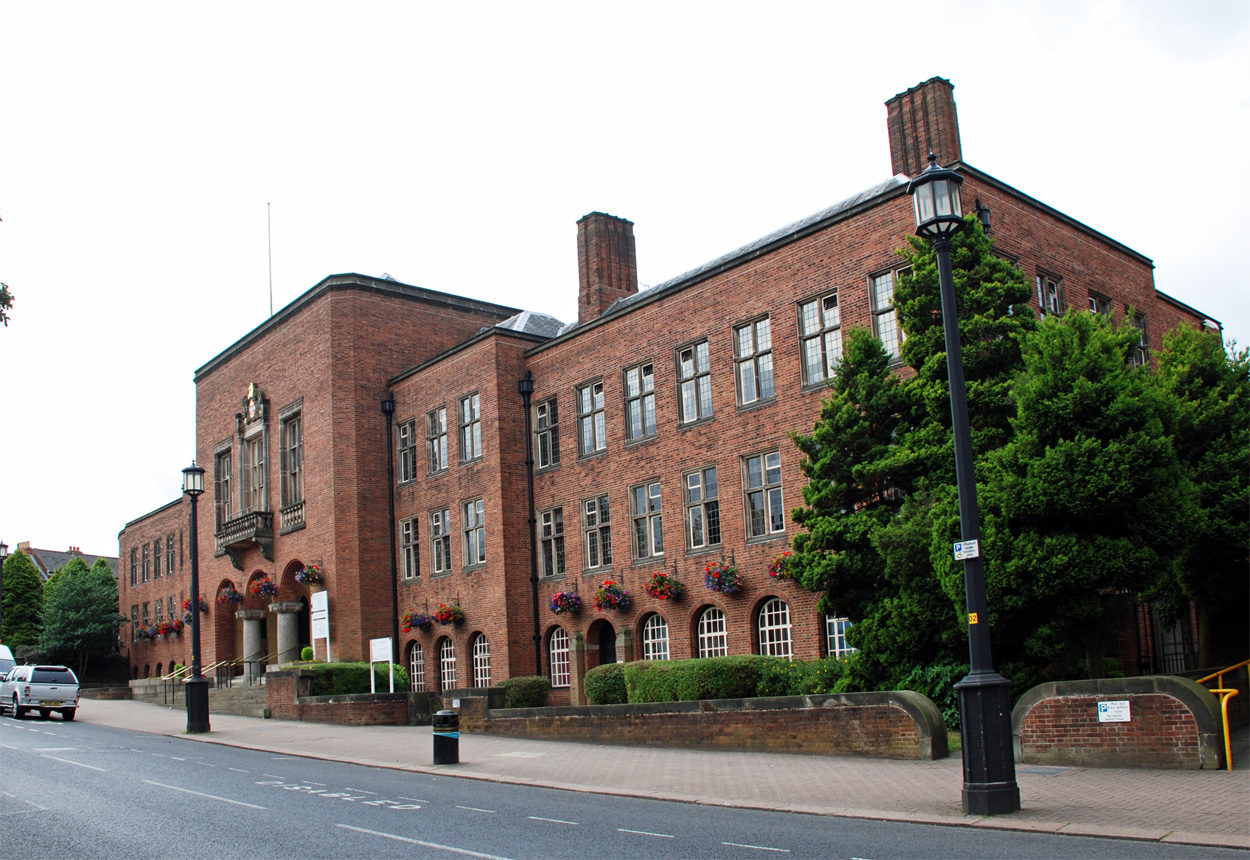
- Council House, Priory Road, Dudley, DY1 1HF
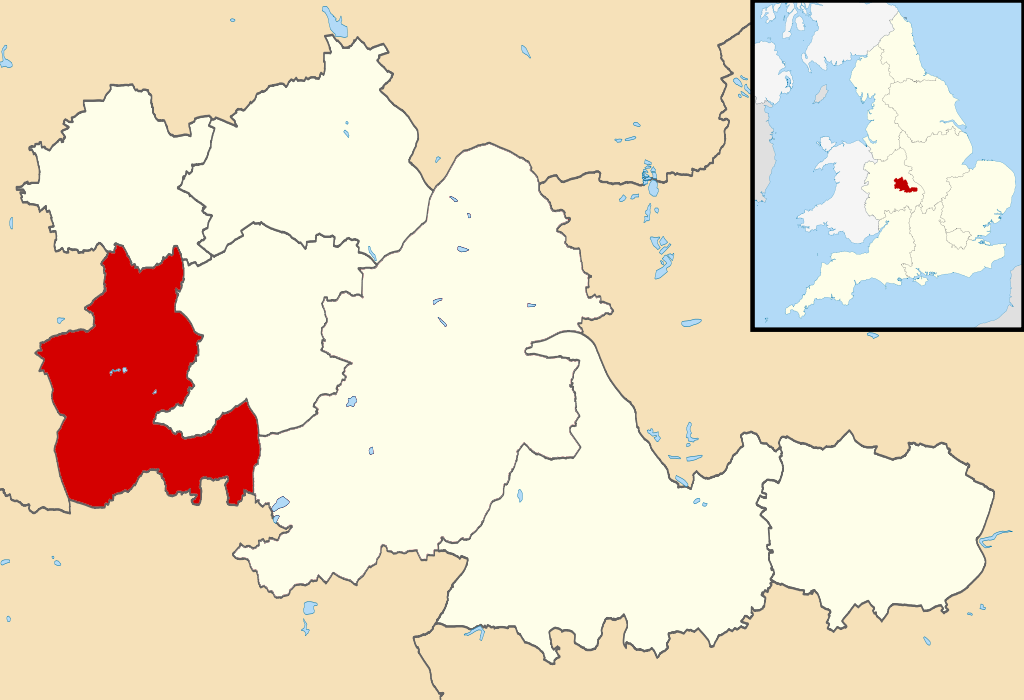
- Dudley Metropolitan Borough shown within West Midlands

Website
- www.dudley.gov.uk

Dudley Metropolitan Borough Council, also known as Dudley Council, is the local authority for the Metropolitan Borough of Dudley in the West Midlands, England. The town of Dudley had been a borough since the thirteenth century, being reformed on numerous occasions. Since 1974 the council has been a metropolitan borough council. It provides the majority of local government services in the borough. The council has been a member of the West Midlands Combined Authority since 2016.

The council has been under no overall control since the 2024 election, with the leader of the council being a Conservative. It is based at Dudley Council House.

== History ==
The town of Dudley had been a seigneurial borough from the thirteenth century, under the control of the lord of the manor. More modern forms of local government for the town began in 1791 when a body of improvement commissioners was established to pave, light and clean the streets, and supply water. The commissioners were replaced in 1853 with an elected local board.

The town was incorporated as a municipal borough in 1865, governed by a body formally called the "mayor, aldermen and burgesses of the borough of Dudley", generally known as the corporation, town council or borough council. The old local board's functions passed to the new borough council, which also replaced the ancient borough corporation.

When elected county councils were established in 1889, Dudley was considered large enough to provide its own county-level functions, and so it was made a county borough, independent from Worcestershire County Council, whilst remaining part of the geographical county of Worcestershire (despite being an exclave detached from the rest of the county). The County Borough of Dudley was enlarged on several occasions, notably in 1966 when it absorbed the majority of the abolished urban districts of Brierley Hill, Coseley and Sedgeley, alongside boundary adjustments with several other neighbours. As part of the 1966 reforms the borough was transferred to the geographical county of Staffordshire.

The modern metropolitan borough and its council were established in 1974 under the Local Government Act 1972, as one of seven boroughs in the new metropolitan county of the West Midlands. The new borough covered the combined area of the old county borough of Dudley plus the municipal boroughs of Halesowen and Stourbridge (the latter having absorbed the main part of the abolished Amblecote Urban District in the 1966 reforms). The enlarged district was named Dudley, and the borough status previously held by the county borough passed to the new district on its creation, allowing the chair of the council to take the title of mayor, continuing Dudley's series of mayors dating back to at least the sixteenth century.

From 1974 until 1986 the council was a lower-tier authority, with upper-tier functions provided by the West Midlands County Council. The county council was abolished in 1986 and its functions passed to the county's seven borough councils, including Dudley, with some services provided through joint committees.

Since 2016 the council has been a member of the West Midlands Combined Authority, which has been led by the directly elected Mayor of the West Midlands since 2017. The combined authority provides strategic leadership and co-ordination for certain functions across the county, but Dudley Council continues to be responsible for most local government functions.

The council bid for the borough to be awarded city status in 2011 and again in 2021, but was unsuccessful on both occasions.

== Governance ==
Dudley Metropolitan Borough Council provides both county-level and district-level services, with some functions across the West Midlands provided via joint committees with the other West Midlands authorities, overseen by the combined authority and mayor. There are no civil parishes in the borough, which is an unparished area.

=== Political control ===
The council has been under no overall control since the 2024 election, which saw the Conservatives lose their majority. They retained the leadership of the council, forming a minority administration.

Political control of the council since 1974 has been as follows:

Party in control	Years
Labour	1974–1976
Conservative	1976–1980
No overall control	1980–1982
Conservative	1982–1984
No overall control	1984–1986
Labour	1986–1992
Conservative	1992–1992
No overall control	1992–1994
Labour	1994–2003
No overall control	2003–2004
Conservative	2004–2012
Labour	2012–2016
No overall control	2016–2021
Conservative	2021–2024
No overall control	2024–present

=== Leadership ===
The role of mayor is largely ceremonial in Dudley. Political leadership is instead provided by the leader of the council. The leaders since 1974 have been:

Councillor	Party	From	To
Joe Jones	Labour	1 Apr 1974	May 1975
Tom Clitheroe	Labour	May 1975	May 1976
Joe Rowley	Conservative	May 1976	May 1978
Jack Edmonds	Conservative	May 1978	May 1984
Fred Hunt	Labour	May 1984	May 1992
David Caunt	Conservative	May 1992	Jul 1992
Fred Hunt	Labour	Jul 1992	May 1998
Tim Sunter	Labour	21 May 1998	May 2003
David Caunt	Conservative	15 May 2003	21 May 2009
Anne Millward	Conservative	21 May 2009	May 2011
Les Jones	Conservative	19 May 2011	May 2012
David Sparks	Labour	17 May 2012	1 Dec 2014
Pete Lowe	Labour	1 Dec 2014	18 May 2017
Patrick Harley	Conservative	18 May 2017	26 Sep 2018
Pete Lowe	Labour	26 Sep 2018	15 Nov 2018
Qadar Zada	Labour	15 Nov 2018	May 2019
Patrick Harley	Conservative	16 May 2019	

=== Composition ===
Following the 2026 election and a subequent change in July 2026, the composition of the council was:

Party	Seats
Conservative	27
Reform	23
Labour	15
Liberal Democrats	4
Black Country Party	2
Independent	1
Total	72

The next election is due in May 2027.

== Premises ==
The council has its main offices at Dudley Council House on Priory Road, which was built in phases between 1928 and 1935 for the old county borough council.

== Elections ==
Since the last boundary changes in 2004 the council has comprised 72 councillors representing 24 wards, with each ward electing three councillors. Elections are held three years out of every four, with a third of the council (one councillor for each ward) being elected each time for a four-year term of office. Elections for the Mayor of the West Midlands are held in the fourth year of the cycle when there are no borough council elections. New ward boundaries are being prepared to take effect from the 2024 election, which will require all seats to be contested at that election.

=== Wards ===
The 24 wards of the Dudley Borough are each represented by 3 councillors. The council groups wards together into 5 Community Forums to enable community engagement under the banner "Your home, your forum".

Community Forum	Ward name
Brierley Hill	Brierley Hill and Wordsley South
Brierley Hill	Brockmoor and Pensnett
Brierley Hill	Kingswinford North and Wall Heath
Brierley Hill	Kingswinford South
Brierley Hill	Wordsley North
Stourbridge	Amblecote
Stourbridge	Lye and Stourbridge North
Stourbridge	Norton
Stourbridge	Pedmore and Stourbridge East
Stourbridge	Wollaston and Stourbridge Town
Dudley	Castle and Priory
Dudley	Netherton and Holly Hall
Dudley	Quarry Bank and Dudley Wood
Dudley	St. James's
Dudley	St. Thomas's
Dudley North	Coseley
Dudley North	Gornal
Dudley North	Sedgley
Dudley North	Upper Gornal and Woodsetton
Halesowen	Belle Vale
Halesowen	Cradley North and Wollescote
Halesowen	Halesowen North
Halesowen	Halesowen South
Halesowen	Hayley Green and Cradley South

== Members of parliament ==
Following the 2023 review of constituencies and the July 2024 UK general election, the members of parliament for constituencies within Dudley MBC area are:

Constituency	Member of Parliament	Political Party
Dudley	Sonia Kumar	Labour
Stourbridge	Cat Eccles	Labour
Halesowen	Alex Ballinger	Labour
Kingswinford and South Staffordshire	Mike Wood	Conservative
Tipton and Wednesbury	Antonia Bance	Labour

== Chief Executives ==
Dates	Name
1973–1986	John Francis Mulvehill
1986	Leslie Thomas Barnfield
1986–1988	Tom Headley Meredith
1988–1999	Alistair Vivian Astling
1999–2008	Andrew Sparke
2009–2015	John Polychronakis
2015–2019	Sarah Norman
2019–2024	Kevin John O'Keefe
2024–present	Balvinder Heran

== Mayor of Dudley and Civic Awards ==
The Mayor presides over meetings of the full Council to ensure that business is carried out properly and efficiently, with due regard to the rights of Councillors and the interest of the Community. The Mayor of the Borough is elected at the Annual Meeting of the Council (usually in May each year) from the existing elected councillors.

The Mayor also nominates charities they wish to support during their mayoral year and hosts the annual Mayors Ball and Civic Awards. The Civic Awards aim to recognise individuals and groups who make a difference in the borough. Each award is named for a local personality in that field.

- The Frank Foley award for community spirit
- The William Shenstone award for environment
- The Duncan Edwards award for sport
- The Cedric Hardwicke award for arts
- The Thomas Attwood award for education
- The Mike Holder award for business

== Civic arms and motto ==
Dudley's coat of arms was designed in 1975. It symbolises each of the authorities that came together to form the present borough. Key themes on the civic arms reflect the area's pride in its industrial past.

The council adopted "Unity and Progress" as its motto in 1974.
