= List of Leicester Tigers players selected for international rugby =

Since the founding of the Leicester Tigers rugby union club (as Leicester Football Club) in 1880, more than 150 players have represented their national teams while members of the club.

The "position" column lists the position at which the player played in his first international while a member of Leicester Tigers, not necessarily the position for which he is best known; where brackets () are used, this indicates an appearance as a replacement. Ben Youngs, for instance, made his debut as a replacement wing but is best known as a scrum-half. The "date first cap obtained" column lists the date of their first cap obtained while at Leicester Tigers not their international debut. JP Pietersen for instance won many international caps for South Africa before joining Leicester.

Leicester's internationally capped players
Number	Name	Position	Nation	Date first cap obtained	Opposition
1	Jack Miles	Wing	England	1903-01-10	Wales
2	Jacky Braithwaite	Scrum-half	England	1905-12-02	New Zealand
2	Alfred Hind	Wing	England	1905-12-02	New Zealand
2	Richard Russell	Forward	England	1905-12-02	New Zealand
2	John Jackett	Full back	England	1905-12-02	New Zealand
6	Fred Jackson	Forward	Lions	1908-06-06	New Zealand
7	Tom Smith	Forward	Lions	1908-06-27	New Zealand
8	Sid Penny	Hooker	England	1909-01-09	Australia
8	Alf Kewney	Forward	England	1909-01-09	Australia
10	Percy Lawrie	Wing	England	1910-03-19	Scotland
11	Ken Wood	Centre	Lions	1910-08-06	South Africa
12	George Ward	Hooker	England	1913-01-18	Wales
13	Frank Tarr	Centre	England	1913-03-15	Scotland
14	Tim Taylor	Fly-half	England	1914-01-17	Wales
14	Pedlar Wood	Scrum-half	England	1914-01-17	Wales
16	Harold Day	Wing	England	1920-01-17	Wales
17	Sos Taylor	Prop	England	1920-01-31	France
18	Alastair Smallwood	Wing	England	1921-01-15	Wales
19	Leo Price	Flanker	England	1923-01-20	Wales
20	Wavell Wakefield	Flanker	England	1924-01-19	Wales
21	Jock Lawrie	Flanker	Scotland	1924-02-02	Wales
22	Edward Massey	Scrum-half	England	1925-01-17	Wales
23	Ralph Buckingham	Centre	England	1927-04-02	France
24	Harry Greenlees	Fly-half	Scotland	1927-12-17	Australia
25	George Beamish	No. 8	Ireland	1928-01-28	France
26	Doug Prentice	No. 8	England	1928-02-11	Ireland
27	Doug Norman	Hooker	England	1932-01-02	South Africa
27	Bobby Barr	Full back	England	1932-01-02	South Africa
29	Bernard Gadney	Scrum-half	England	1932-02-13	Ireland
30	Douglas Kendrew	Prop	England	1933-02-11	Ireland
31	Morgan Crowe	Centre	Ireland	1933-03-11	Wales
32	Paddy Coote	Centre	Ireland	1933-04-01	Scotland
33	Charles Beamish	Prop	Ireland	1934-02-24	Scotland
34	Charles Slow	Fly-half	England	1934-03-17	Scotland
35	Ernie Nicholson	Hooker	England	1936-01-04	New Zealand
36	Tom Berry	Flanker	England	1939-01-21	Wales
37	Bill Moore	Scrum-half	England	1947-01-18	Wales
38	Allan Towell	Centre	England	1948-03-29	France
39	Bob Stirling	Prop	England	1951-01-20	Wales
40	David Hazell	Prop	England	1955-01-22	Wales
41	Ian Swan	Wing	Scotland	1958-01-11	France
42	Phil Horrocks-Taylor	Fly-half	Lions	1959-08-29	New Zealand
43	Tony O'Reilly	Wing	Ireland	1959-04-18	France
44	Mike Gavins	Full back	England	1961-01-21	Wales
45	Ken Scotland	Full back	Scotland	1962-01-13	France
46	Mike Wade	Centre	England	1962-01-20	Wales
47	Nick Drake-Lee	Prop	England	1963-01-19	Wales
48	Bob Rowell	Lock	England	1964-01-18	Wales
49	Rodger Arneil	Flanker	Scotland	1969-12-06	South Africa
50	Alan Old	Fly-half	England	1973-09-15	New Zealand
51	Peter Wheeler	Hooker	England	1975-02-01	France
52	Garry Adey	No. 8	England	1976-03-06	Ireland
53	Robin Cowling	Prop	England	1977-01-15	Scotland
54	Dusty Hare	Full back	England	1978-01-21	France
55	Paul Dodge	Centre	England	1978-02-04	Wales
56	Les Cusworth	Fly-half	England	1979-11-24	New Zealand
57	Clive Woodward	(Centre)	England	1980-01-19	Ireland
58	Nick Youngs	Scrum-half	England	1983-03-19	Ireland
59	Rory Underwood	Wing	England	1984-02-18	Ireland
60	Steve Redfern	(Prop)	England	1984-02-18	Ireland
61	Dean Richards	No. 8	England	1986-03-01	Ireland
62	Barry Evans	Wing	England	1988-06-12	Australia
63	Brian Smith	Fly-half	Ireland	1990-10-27	Argentina
64	Tony Underwood	Wing	England	1992-10-17	Canada
65	Martin Johnson	Lock	England	1993-01-16	France
66	Neil Back	Flanker	England	1994-02-05	Scotland
67	Niall Malone	(Centre)	Ireland	1994-11-05	United States
68	Graham Rowntree	(Prop)	England	1995-03-18	Scotland
69	Craig Joiner	Wing	Scotland	1996-06-15	New Zealand
70	Eric Miller	Flanker	Ireland	1997-01-04	Italy
71	Austin Healey	(Scrum-half)	England	1997-02-15	Ireland
72	Darren Garforth	(Prop)	England	1997-03-15	Wales
73	Richard Cockerill	(Hooker)	England	1997-05-31	Argentina
74	Will Greenwood	Centre	England	1997-11-15	Australia
75	Dorian West	(Hooker)	England	1998-02-07	France
76	Tim Stimpson	Full back	England	1998-06-06	Australia
77	Stuart Potter	(Centre)	England	1998-06-06	Australia
78	Dave Lougheed	Wing	Canada	1998-08-18	United States
79	Martin Corry	No. 8	England	1998-11-14	Netherlands
80	Fritz van Heerden	Lock	South Africa	1999-10-10	Spain
81	Geordan Murphy	Full back	Ireland	2000-06-10	United States
82	Leon Lloyd	(Centre)	England	2000-06-17	South Africa
83	Winston Stanley	Wing	Canada	2000-11-11	Italy
84	Freddie Tuilagi	Centre	Samoa	2000-11-11	Wales
85	Ben Kay	Lock	England	2001-06-02	Canada
85	Lewis Moody	Flanker	England	2001-06-02	Canada
87	Ollie Smith	(Centre)	England	2003-03-09	Italy
88	Ramiro Pez	Fly-half	Italy	2003-08-23	Scotland
89	Julian White	Prop	England	2003-08-23	Wales
90	Dan Lyle	No. 8	United States	2003-10-15	Fiji
91	Jaco van der Westhuyzen	Fly-half	South Africa	2004-06-12	Ireland
92	Darren Morris	(Prop)	Wales	2004-06-12	Argentina
93	Seru Rabeni	(Centre)	Pacific Islanders	2004-07-03	Australia
94	Harry Ellis	(Scrum-half)	England	2004-11-20	South Africa
95	Andy Goode	(Fly-half)	England	2005-03-12	Italy
96	Alesana Tuilagi	Wing	Samoa	2005-06-11	Australia
97	Ephraim Taukafa	(Hooker)	Tonga	2005-06-25	Fiji
98	Anitelea Tuilagi	Centre	Samoa	2005-07-02	Tonga
99	Leo Cullen	Lock	Ireland	2005-11-26	Romania
100	Louis Deacon	Lock	England	2005-11-26	Samoa
101	Tom Varndell	(Wing)	England	2005-11-26	Samoa
102	George Chuter	(Hooker)	England	2006-06-11	Australia
103	Martin Castrogiovanni	Prop	Italy	2006-10-07	Portugal
104	Marcos Ayerza	Prop	Argentina	2006-11-11	England
105	Jim Hamilton	(Lock)	Scotland	2006-11-11	Romania
106	Shane Jennings	Flanker	Ireland	2007-06-02	Argentina
107	Dan Hipkiss	Centre	England	2007-08-04	Wales
108	Tom Croft	(Flanker)	England	2008-02-23	France
109	Benjamin Kayser	(Hooker)	France	2008-06-28	Australia
110	Alejandro Moreno	(Prop)	Italy	2008-06-28	Argentina
111	Toby Flood	(Fly-half)	England	2008-11-08	Pacific Islanders
112	Jordan Crane	(No. 8)	England	2008-11-22	South Africa
113	Sam Vesty	(Centre)	England	2009-06-06	Argentina
114	Julien Dupuy	Scrum-half	France	2009-06-13	New Zealand
115	Dan Cole	(Prop)	England	2010-02-06	Wales
116	Ben Youngs	(Wing)	England	2010-03-13	Scotland
117	Lucas González Amorosino	(Wing)	Argentina	2010-06-12	Scotland
118	Horacio Agulla	Wing	Argentina	2010-11-28	Ireland
119	Manu Tuilagi	Centre	England	2011-08-06	Wales
120	Geoff Parling	(Lock)	England	2012-02-04	Scotland
121	Logovi'i Mulipola	Prop	Samoa	2012-06-05	Tonga
121	Steve Mafi	Flanker	Tonga	2012-06-05	Samoa
123	Thomas Waldrom	(No. 8)	England	2012-06-16	South Africa
124	Tom Youngs	Hooker	England	2012-11-10	Fiji
124	Vereniki Goneva	Centre	Fiji	2012-11-10	England
126	Gonzalo Camacho	Wing	Argentina	2013-08-17	South Africa
127	Blaine Scully	Wing	United States	2013-08-17	Canada
128	Pablo Matera	Flanker	Argentina	2013-11-09	England
129	Leonardo Ghiraldini	Hooker	Italy	2014-11-08	Samoa
130	Robert Barbieri	(Flanker)	Italy	2014-11-08	Samoa
131	Michele Rizzo	Prop	Italy	2015-03-21	Wales
132	Opeti Fonua	(Flanker)	Tonga	2015-09-29	Namibia
133	Ellis Genge	(Prop)	England	2016-05-29	Wales
134	Seremaia Bai	Centre	Fiji	2016-06-11	Tonga
135	JP Pietersen	Wing	South Africa	2016-11-12	England
136	Telusa Veainu	Full back	Tonga	2016-11-19	United States
137	Owen Williams	(Centre)	Wales	2017-06-16	Tonga
138	George Ford	Fly-half	England	2017-11-11	Argentina
139	Jonny May	Wing	England	2017-11-18	Australia
140	Atieli Pakalani	Full back	Tonga	2017-11-18	Japan
141	Luke Hamilton	(Flanker)	Scotland	2017-11-18	New Zealand
142	Chris Baumann	Prop	United States	2018-02-24	Brazil
143	Valentino Mapapalangi	(Flanker)	Tonga	2018-06-09	Georgia
144	Tatafu Polota-Nau	Hooker	Australia	2018-08-18	New Zealand
145	Matt To'omua	(Centre)	Australia	2018-08-18	New Zealand
146	Gaston Cortes	(Prop)	Argentina	2018-09-18	New Zealand
147	Campese Ma'afu	Prop	Fiji	2018-11-10	Scotland
148	Jonah Holmes	Full back	Wales	2018-11-17	Tonga
149	Jake Kerr	(Hooker)	Scotland	2019-02-02	Italy
150	Sione Kalamafoni	(Flanker)	Tonga	2019-08-31	Fiji
151	Shalva Mamukashvili	(Hooker)	Georgia	2020-10-23	Scotland
152	Kini Murimurivalu	Full back	Fiji	2020-12-05	Georgia
153	Nemani Nadolo	Wing	Fiji	2020-12-05	Georgia
154	George Martin	(Number 8)	England	2021-03-20	Ireland
155	Jasper Wiese	(Number 8)	South Africa	2021-07-02	Georgia
156	Julián Montoya	Hooker	Argentina	2021-07-03	Romania
156	Matías Moroni	Centre	Argentina	2021-07-03	Romania
158	Joe Heyes	Prop	England	2021-07-04	United States
158	Freddie Steward	Full back	England	2021-07-04	United States
160	Harry Wells	Lock	England	2021-07-10	Canada
160	Dan Kelly	Centre	England	2021-07-10	Canada
162	Marco van Staden	(Flanker)	South Africa	2021-07-31	Lions
163	Matt Scott	Centre	Scotland	2021-11-13	South Africa
164	Nic Dolly	(Hooker)	England	2021-11-20	South Africa
165	Ollie Chessum	(Lock)	England	2022-02-13	Italy
166	Jack van Poortvliet	(Scrum half)	England	2022-07-02	Australia
167	Tommy Reffell	Flanker	Wales	2022-07-02	South Africa
168	Guy Porter	Centre	England	2022-07-09	Australia
169	Handre Pollard	Fly half	South Africa	2022-07-09	Wales
170	Nephi Leatigaga	(Prop)	Samoa	2022-11-05	Italy
171	Anthony Watson	(Wing)	England	2023-02-04	Scotland
172	Solomone Kata	Wing	Tonga	2023-07-22	Fiji
173	Cameron Henderson	(Lock)	Scotland	2023-07-29	Italy
174	Will Hurd	(Prop)	Scotland	2024-07-06	Canada
175	Nicky Smith	(Prop)	Wales	2024-11-10	Fiji
176	James O'Connor	Fly half	Australia	2025-08-16	South Africa
177	Tonga Kofe	Prop	United States	2025-08-22	Canada
178	Ale Loman	Prop	Sweden	2025-10-25	Croatia
179	Olly Cracknell	(Flanker)	Wales	2025-11-09	Argentina
180	Gabriel Hamer-Webb	Wing	Wales	2026-02-21	Scotland
181	Joaquín Moro	(Number 8)	Argentina	2026-07-04	Scotland
182	Joel Sclavi	(Prop)	Argentina	2026-11-06	Ireland
183	Richie Asiata	Hooker	Samoa	2026-11-07	Zimbabwe
184	Aaron Wainwright	Number 8	Wales	2026-11-07	Japan

== Sources ==
- Farmer, Stuart; Hands, David. Tigers: Official History of Leicester Football Club. The Rugby Development Foundation. p. 449. ISBN 978-0-9930213-0-5.
