= John Allen (rugby union) =

English rugby union player (1942–2022)

- Birth name: John Albert Allen
- Date of birth: 29 July 1942
- Place of birth: Leicester, England
- Date of death: 10 December 2022 (aged 80)
- School: Lutterworth Grammar School
- Occupation(s): Chartered Accountant

Rugby union career
- Position(s): Scrum half
Senior career
Years	Team	Apps	(Points)
1961–1975	Leicester Tigers	457	(297)

John Albert Allen (29 July 1942 – 10 December 2022) was an English rugby union player and administrator for Leicester Tigers. In a 14-year career Allen played 457 games for Leicester, the 3rd most of all time, his position in all games was scrum half. Allen also toured with the Barbarians in 1974. He served Leicester as treasurer, secretary, non-executive director and was also a life member.

Allen died on 10 December 2022, at the age of 80.

== Playing career ==
Allen made his Leicester Tigers debut on Thursday 26 January 1961 against the Royal Air Force in an 11–6 defeat at Welford Road Recreation Ground (now known as Nelson Mandela Park). He played once more that season in a win against Exeter in April. Competing for his position with Chalkie White Allen played 11 of the first 14 fixtures in the 1961–62 season but with Leicester losing 7 of those fixtures he dropped back behind White for the remainder of the season featuring only twice more. He featured once in 1962–63 before establishing himself as the first choice scrum half in the 1963–64 season, he combined well with fly half & captain Mike Wade.

Allen was by now the established first choice scrum half, in the 1968–69 season Allen started in all the club's 43 games. Allen captained Leicester in the 1970–71 season, playing in 44 of the side's 45 games; Leicester had a record of 23 wins, 2 draws and 20 losses. Allen continued until the 1975–76 season when he played his final game for the club on 13 September 1975 in a 37–7 win against Bath at Welford Road.

== Administration career ==
After retiring from playing Allen became Leicester's club treasurer in 1976 and club secretary from 1982 to 1995. He was appointed life member in 1997 and was a non-executive director between 1997 and 2007. In 2002, Allen was part of a 5-man review panel into the management structure of Leicestershire County Cricket Club.

== Sources ==
- Farmer, Stuart; Hands, David (2014). Tigers - Official history of Leicester Football Club. The Rugby Development Foundation. ISBN 978-0-9930213-0-5.
