= George Ward (rugby union) =

England international rugby union player

- Born: Joseph Alfred George Ward; 19 March 1885 Bottesford, Leicestershire
- Died: Reg Q3, 1962 Leicester, England
- Occupation: Boiler riveter

Rugby union career
- Position: Hooker
Senior career
Years	Team	Apps	(Points)
1910–26	Leicester Tigers	361	(63)
International career
Years	Team	Apps	(Points)
1913–14	England	6	(0)

Joseph Alfred George Ward known as George Ward (born 19 March 1885 – death registered Quarter 2 1962) was a rugby union hooker who played 361 games for Leicester Tigers between 1910 and 1926 and six times for England in 1913 and 1914.

Ward made his Leicester debut on 9 March 1910 in a 20–0 win away to Moseley. Ward featured 5 times in the remaining 8 games of the season and was a regular player in the 1910–1911 season playing in 34 of 42 games. Ward was selected for Midlands Counties against the touring Springboks in 1912 and made his England debut on 18 January 1913 against Wales at Cardiff. Ward played 3 times for England in their 1913 grandslam, missing the match against Ireland due to the travel, though there was the suggestion international rugby did not appeal to him. Nevertheless, Ward was also a member of 1914 England grandslam team, again missing the one match played overseas, this time in France.

Ward won the Midlands Counties Cup with Leicester in 1912 and 1913. He was vice-captain of the club for 10 years between 1918 and 1928, deputising regularly for Percy Lawrie. Ward became the 6th player to feature in 300 games for Leicester Tigers when he played against Nuneaton on 27 October 1923; he is the oldest player when making his 300th appearance for the club at 38 years and 222 days old and still has the 14th most appearances for the club. Later in the same season, also against Nuneaton on 31 March 1924, Ward became the club's oldest captain at 39 years and 12 days old, the record stood until 16 November 2014 when Brad Thorn captained Tigers for the only time.

== Sources ==
Farmer, Stuart & Hands, David Tigers-Official History of Leicester Football Club (The Rugby DevelopmentFoundation ISBN 978-0-9930213-0-5)
