= David Hazell =

England international rugby union player

- Born: David St George Hazell; 23 April 1931 Taunton, England
- Died: 26 May 2007 (aged 76) Taunton, England
- School: Taunton School
- University: Loughborough College

Rugby union career
- Position: Prop
Senior career
Years	Team	Apps	(Points)
1953–56	Leicester Tigers	81	(265)
1956–64	Bristol	241	
International career
Years	Team	Apps	(Points)
1955	England	4	(9)

David St George Hazell (23 April 1931 – 26 May 2007) was a rugby union player who appeared for Leicester Tigers between 1953–1956, for Bristol Rugby between 1956–64, and four times for England in 1955.

Hazell was born on Saint George's Day in 1931 leading to the unusual middle name of "St George". He studied at Taunton School and Loughborough College before taking up a teaching position in Nottingham.

Hazell made his debut for Leicester Tigers on 5 September 1953 in a 12-6 win against Bedford at Welford Road. Hazell quickly became the club's first choice goal-kicker and ended his first season as the club's leading points scorer with 102 points in 30 games, he was also the joint top-try scorer for the season with 8. Hazell was also Leicester's top scorer in the 1954–55 season despite only playing two games between January and March as he was missing with international duty. His final season with Leicester was 1955–56 and saw Hazell play 26 games and score 67 points. His final Tigers game was a 16-9 loss to Northampton Saints at Welford Road on 23 April 1956.

Hazell became only the fourth Leicester player since the Second World War to be selected for England when he made his international debut on 22 January 1955 against Wales at Cardiff. He played in all four matches in the 1955 Five Nations Championship for England and kicked the winning goal in England's 9-6 win over Scotland in March.

Hazell left Nottingham to teach at Taunton School. He played for Bristol, making 241 appearances between 1956 and 1964, captained Somerset and played for the Western Counties against New Zealand in 1963/64.

== Sources ==
- Farmer, Stuart; Hands, David (2014). Tigers - Official history of Leicester Football Club. The Rugby Development Foundation. ISBN 978-0-9930213-0-5.
