= Sid Penny =

England international rugby union player

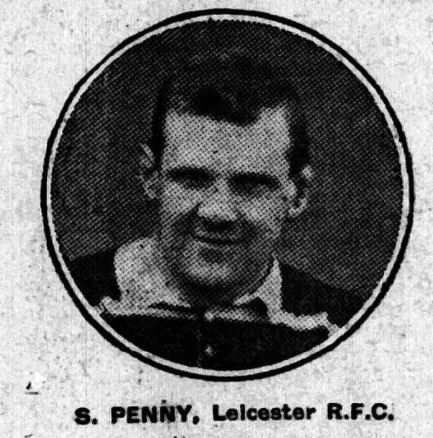
- Born: Sidney Herbert Penny; 7 October 1875 Finchley, North London
- Died: 23 May 1965 (aged 89) Leicester, England
- Occupation(s): Clicker in boot and shoe trade

Rugby union career
- Position: Hooker
Senior career
| Years | Team | Apps | (Points) |
| 1896–1910 | Leicester Tigers | 491 | (48) |
International career
| Years | Team | Apps | (Points) |
| 1909 | England | 1 | (0) |

Sidney Herbert Penny (7 October 1875 – 23 May 1965) was a rugby union hooker who played 491 games for Leicester Tigers between 1896 and 1910 and once for England in 1909.

Penny made his Leicester debut on 4 January 1896 away to Gloucester in a 20–12 defeat and by the end of the season firmly established himself in the side. 10 years later on 1 December 1906 against Northampton Penny broke the club's appearance record with his 359th appearance for the club. On Boxing Day 1910 he was awarded an honorary scroll for making 500 first team appearances, however modern research can find only 491 games in which he played. This was the record number of appearances until 1973 David Matthews broke his record. He is still second most selected player for Leicester Tigers of all time.

Penny played in a record 40 Midlands Counties Cup games, winning the competition a record 10 times including 8 in succession, and losing only once.

Penny played his only international for England on 9 January 1909 against Australia at Blackheath.

== Sources ==
Farmer, Stuart & Hands, David Tigers-Official History of Leicester Football Club (The Rugby DevelopmentFoundation ISBN 978-0-9930213-0-5)
