= Les Cusworth =

England international rugby union player

- Born: 31 July 1954 (age 72) Normanton, West Yorkshire, England

Rugby union career
- Position: Fly-half
Senior career
Years	Team	Apps	(Points)
- Wakefield RFC
- Moseley
1978-1990	Leicester Tigers	365	(947)
International career
Years	Team	Apps	(Points)
1979–1988	England	12	(12)
Coaching career
- Years: Team
- England sevens England national rugby union team
- –: Worcester RFC

Les Cusworth (born 31 July 1954) is a former English rugby union footballer, coach of the winning 1993 England rugby 7s team, former assistant coach of England national rugby team and former Director of Rugby for Worcester and the national team of Argentina.

== Education ==
He was educated at Normanton Grammar School and the West Midlands College of Education, a teacher training college (now part of the University of Wolverhampton).

== Playing career ==
He started his club career at Wakefield RFC where he set the British club record of 25 drop goals in just 21 games in the 1974–75 season and helped Wakefield reach the semi-finals of the John Player Cup in 1975–76.

He later moved to Moseley and Leicester Tigers from where he won 12 England caps over nine years (1979–1988), although he was never really favoured by the English management as he was an unpredictable running fly half.

He played 365 times for Tigers scoring 947 points, and playing alongside Paul Dodge, Clive Woodward, Nick Youngs in Tigers' three-time John Player Cup winning sides between 1979 and 1981.

He also played for English Colleges, British Colleges, Yorkshire, North East Counties and played in the North Midlands team which won the county championships in 1978.

== Coaching career ==
After retiring from playing, he coached an England sevens team, including Lawrence Dallaglio and Matt Dawson to an unexpected World Cup victory at Murrayfield in 1993.

Thereafter from 1994-1997 Les was Assistant Coach to England national rugby team, a period that included winning the Five Nations Championship twice, including a Grand Slam in 1995 and 1996.

He also served as director of rugby at Worcester RFC and the Argentina Rugby Union before working freelance and as a rugby public speaker.
