= Stuart Redfern =

English rugby union player

- Born: Stuart Bernard Redfern; 16 July 1961 (age 65) Leicester, England
- School: South Charnwood High School; King Edward VII Upper (Coalville)
- Notable relative: Steve Redfern
- Occupation: Mechanical Engineer

Rugby union career
- Position: Prop
Senior career
Years	Team	Apps	(Points)
1976-1984	Leicester Tigers	324	(100)

Stuart Bernard Redfern (born 16 June 1961 in Leicester) is an English retired rugby union player who played in the 1980s and 1990s. He played 324 games for Leicester Tigers between 1982–1992 and played for an England XV against a Rest of the World XV in 1984, his position was loosehead prop. He retired from Leicester in 1992. He was later a member of the Tigers' coaching team and coach of Coalville RFC. His older brother is Steve Redfern, with whom he started 45 times for Leicester.
