= Graham Willars =

English rugby union player

- Born: Graham George Willars; 20 November 1939 Leicester, Leicestershire
- Died: 20 September 1997 (aged 57) Leicester
- School: Moat Boys School
- Occupation: Communications manager for BT

Rugby union career
- Position: Flanker
Senior career
Years	Team	Apps	(Points)
1959–1987	Leicester Tigers	338	(129)

Graham George Willars known as Graham Willars (20 November 1939 - 20 September 1997) was an English rugby union flanker who played a 338 games for Leicester Tigers from 1959 to 1987, he also coached the side from 1982–87 and was club president from 1991–93.

== Playing career ==
Willars made his Leicester debut as a 19 year old on 17 October 1959 against Cheltenham at Welford Road and played 21 times in his first season. However competition for places was fierce and in 1960/61 he played only 5 times and did not feature at all in either 1961/62 or 1962/63. Willars reappeared in the first team against Waterloo in December 1962 and was then a feature in the team for many years. Willars was club captain in 1968/69 and then again in 1972/73.

Willars' career lasted 27 years and 169 days, spanning 1,154 Tigers games, the longest by both measures of any player for Leicester Tigers. He featured as a player in a record 20 different seasons. At 47 years and 135 days he is also the oldest player to play for the club.

== Coaching and administration career ==
Willars succeeded Chalkie White as Tigers' first team coach and lead the side from 1982–87 leading the side to the final of the 1982-83 John Player Cup, where the side lost to Bristol.

== Sources ==
Farmer, Stuart & Hands, David Tigers-Official History of Leicester Football Club (The Rugby DevelopmentFoundation ISBN 978-0-9930213-0-5)

W is for Graham Willars
