= David Matthews (rugby union) =

English rugby union player (1937–2019)

- Born: David Joseph Matthews; 17 April 1937 Barrow, Oakham, Rutland
- Died: 19 June 2019 (aged 82)
- School: Oakham School
- Occupation: Farmer

Rugby union career
- Position: Flanker
Senior career
Years	Team	Apps	(Points)
1955–1974	Leicester Tigers	502	(451)

David Joseph Matthews (17 April 1937 – 19 June 2019) was an English rugby union flanker who played a record 502 games for Leicester Tigers from 1955 to 1974 as well as for Leicestershire, Midlands Counties (East) and the Barbarians. At Leicester he was also a coach, director and was a life member.

== Playing career ==
Matthews joined Tigers direct from Oakham School making his debut as an 18 year old on 3 September 1955 against Bedford at Welford Road. He took a while to establish himself in the club's first team playing only 9 matches over the next 2 seasons but became a regular in the 1957/58 season playing 32 games. Between 1961 and 1963 Matthews played in a record 109 successive games, including every game of 1961/62 and 1962/63 seasons. Matthews was the club's leading try scorer in 1962/63 with 11 tries and set a record for a forward in 1968/69 when he scored 21 tries in 43 games, this was Matthews third ever present season a club record. Matthews was club captain from 1965–1968. Matthews scored his 100th club try against Bristol at the Memorial Ground on 5 April 1969 and ended his career with 119 tries; a record for a forward until Neil Back broke it in 2005. He broke the club's all-time appearance record against Broughton Park on 21 April 1973 with his 492-game and became the only player to make 500 appearances when he played against Northampton on 23 February 1974.

Matthews played in three England trials in 1965–67 without gaining a cap but did face Australia and, despite anti-apartheid protests, against the Springboks with Midlands Counties (East).

Matthews' career lasted 18 years and 187 days, spanning 779 Tigers games in 19 seasons. On both counts this is the second longest Tigers career after Graham Willars.

In February 2011 Matthews was named 56th in Leicestershire's 100 Sporting Greats by the Leicester Mercury.

== Coaching and administration career ==
Matthews was first team coach at Tigers from 1988–91 leading the side to the final of the 1988-89 Pilkington Cup, where the side lost to Bath. In 1997 Matthews became a non-executive director of Leicester Tigers serving until retiring in 2007. From 2001–03 Matthews was club president and in 2005 was awarded life membership.

== Sources ==
Farmer, Stuart & Hands, David Tigers-Official History of Leicester Football Club (The Rugby DevelopmentFoundation ISBN 978-0-9930213-0-5)

M for Mathews
