= Allan Towell =

England international rugby union footballer

- Born: Allan Clark Towell; 7 March 1925 Middlesbrough, England
- Died: 6 March 1997 (aged 71) Frechen, Köln, Germany

Rugby union career
- Position: Centre
Senior career
| Years | Team | Apps | (Points) |
| 1947–50 | Leicester Tigers | 93 | (52) |
| – | Bedford Blues | | |
International career
| Years | Team | Apps | (Points) |
| 1948–51 | England | 2 | (0) |

Allan Clark Towell (7 March 1925 – 6 March 1997) was a rugby union centre who played twice for England between 1948–51. He played his club rugby for Leicester Tigers and Bedford Blues.

Towell made his Leicester Tigers debut on 6 September 1947 against Bedford at Welford Road, scoring a try in a 22-3 win. Towell featured regularly for Leicester at fly-half and centre in the 1947–48 & 1948–49 seasons playing 60 of the club's 75 games. Towell was named as Leicester's captain for the 1949–50 season where he experimented by playing himself at flanker.

Towell made his international debut for England on 29 March 1948 against France at Stade Colombes in a 15-0 defeat. He played one further match in 1951 against Scotland at Twickenham.
