= Bill Moore (rugby union) =

England international rugby union player

- Born: William Kenneth Thomas Moore; 24 February 1921 Leicester, England
- Died: 22 August 2002 (aged 81) Leicester, England
- School: Wyggeston GS

Rugby union career
- Position: Scrum half
Senior career
Years	Team	Apps	(Points)
1945–53	Leicester Tigers	170	(28)
International career
Years	Team	Apps	(Points)
1947–50	England	7	(0)

William Kenneth Thomas Moore (24 February 1921 – 22 August 2002) was a rugby union player who appeared in 170 games for Leicester Tigers between 1945–1953, and seven times for England between 1947–50.

Moore made his Leicester debut on 8 September 1945 against Cardiff as Tigers lost 12–6. This was the club's first game after the end of the Second World War. Moore was an artificer in the Navy so rarely available for Leicester during the season, his next four appearances not coming until Christmas.

In March and April 1946 he played in two Victory Internationals for England against Scotland, but these matches were not considered as "capped matches". Moore's official international debut for England came on 18 January 1947 in a 9–5 win against Wales at Cardiff. He won 7 caps in the 1947, 1949 and 1950 Five Nations.

Moore was named Leicester's captain for the 1950/51 and 1951/52 seasons, the second of which saw him as an ever-present starting all 35 matches. He played his final match for Leicester Tigers on 18 April 1953, a 24–19 win against Sale.

== Sources ==
- Farmer, Stuart; Hands, David (2014). Tigers - Official history of Leicester Football Club. The Rugby Development Foundation. ISBN 978-0-9930213-0-5.
