= Kenneth Berridge Wood =

British Isles international rugby union player

Ken Wood
- Born: Kenneth Berridge Wood; Register Q3 1885 Leicester, England
- Died: 1968 (aged 82–83) South Africa

Rugby union career
- Position: Centre
Senior career
Years	Team	Apps	(Points)
1906–1919	Leicester Tigers	121	(115)
International career
Years	Team	Apps	(Points)
1910	British Isles	2	

Kenneth Berridge Wood known as Ken Wood was a rugby union centre who played 121 times for Leicester Tigers between 1906 and 1919, scoring 33 tries and 4 drop goals for points total of 115. Wood made his Leicester debut on 13 October 1906 at Welford Road against Bristol. He played in two Midlands Counties Cup-winning sides and in 1908 represented Midlands and East Midlands Counties in their win against Australia.

Wood was also a member of the 1910 British Lions tour to South Africa and played in the first and third test, both were lost.

Wood later emigrated to South Africa where he died in 1968.

== Sources ==
Farmer, Stuart & Hands, David Tigers-Official History of Leicester Football Club (The Rugby DevelopmentFoundation ISBN 978-0-9930213-0-5)
