= Bobby Barr (rugby union) =

England international rugby union player

- Born: Robert John Barr; 26 May 1907 Blisworth, England
- Died: 22 September 1975 (aged 68) Great Oxendon, England
- School: Stamford School
- Occupation: Hosiery manufacturer

Rugby union career
- Position: Fullback
Senior career
Years	Team	Apps	(Points)
1928–39	Leicester Tigers	241	(66)
International career
Years	Team	Apps	(Points)
1932	England	3	(2)

Robert John Barr (26 May 1907 – 22 September 1975) was a rugby union player who appeared in 241 games for Leicester Tigers between 1928–1939, and three times for England in 1932. He was also one of only two people to have been captain, secretary and president of Leicester Tigers.

Barr made his Leicester debut on 3 November 1928 against Cambridge University as Tigers lost 20–3. He featured a further 10 times that season but featured only once the following season as he struggled to break into the team. Returning to the line up on 29 January 1931 he featured in 13 of the last 16 games of the 1930–31 season.

Barr played fullback in Leicestershire and the East Midlands victory over the touring South Africans– the Springboks–on 14 November 1931, the only defeat the side suffered on their tour. That performance earned him an England Test debut against the same opposition on 2 January 1932 at Twickenham. He also played two weeks later against Wales at St. Helen's in Swansea. England lost both but Barr was retained for a third and final cap against Ireland at Lansdowne Road which England won 11–8.

Barr became Leicester's regular stand in captain during 1935, deputising when Bernard Gadney was unavailable, and captained Tigers for the 1936–37 and 1937–38 seasons. He never scored a try for Leicester in 241 games, a record for games without a try.

During the Second World War he was a Territorial Officer in the Leicestershire searchlights unit and was captured at Boulogne. He spent five years as a prisoner of war and when he was repatriated was awarded the Military Cross. After the war he was a vital part of reconstructing Leicester Tigers; taking the role of team secretary (arranging the fixtures) and in 1957 becoming secretary of the club. In 1962 he was elected president for a two-year term.

== Sources ==
- Farmer, Stuart; Hands, David (2014). Tigers - Official history of Leicester Football Club. The Rugby Development Foundation. ISBN 978-0-9930213-0-5.
