= Tom Smith (rugby union, born 1883) =

British Isles international rugby union player

- Born: Thomas William Smith; 15 August 1883 Rearsby, Leicestershire
- Died: 15 May 1960 (aged 76) Halton Holegate, Lincolnshire
- Occupation: Publican

Rugby union career
- Position: Forward
Senior career
| Years | Team | Apps | (Points) |
| 1906–1908 | Leicester Tigers | 58 | |
International career
| Years | Team | Apps | (Points) |
| 1908 | British Isles | 2 | |

Thomas William Smith (15 August 1883 – 15 May 1960) was a rugby union forward who played 58 times for Leicester Tigers between 1906 and 1908. Wood made his Leicester debut on 17 March 1906 against Birkenhead Park FC. Smith was also a member of the 1908 British Lions tour to New Zealand and Australia and played in the second and third test, drawing the second and losing the third.

An RFU inquiry in 1908 declared Smith a professional after which he signed professional forms for Broughton Rangers, though he never played a game for them he did turn out once for Coventry's Northern Union side in 1910. Leicester's secretary Tom Crumbie tried to have Smith's amateur status re-instated on the basis that his signature was obtain by gross misrepresentation but was never successful.

== Sources ==
- Farmer, Stuart & Hands, David Tigers-Official History of Leicester Football Club (The Rugby DevelopmentFoundation ISBN 978-0-9930213-0-5)
- Mather, Tom Rugby's Greatest Mystery: Who really was F.S.Jackson?, Appendix 2: The Tigers feat: Leicester Tigers and the RFU 1895 to 1914 (London League Publications LTD ISBN 978-1-903659-60-1)
