= Harry Greenlees =

Scotland international rugby union player

- Born: Henry Dickson Greenlees; 31 July 1903 Pollokshields, Glasgow, Scotland
- Died: 23 May 1969 (aged 65) Houghton on the Hill, Leicestershire, England
- School: Rossall School; The Glasgow Academy
- Occupation: Company Director

Rugby union career
- Position: Fly Half
Senior career
Years	Team	Apps	(Points)
1926–1932	Leicester Tigers	153	(192)
International career
Years	Team	Apps	(Points)
1927–30	Scotland	6	(0)

Henry Dickson Greenlees known as Harry Greenlees (31 July 1903 – 23 May 1969) was a rugby union fly-half who played 153 games for Leicester Tigers and 6 games for Scotland between 1926 and 1932.

The Greenlees family was in the footwear trade and this led them to relocate from Glasgow to Leicester. Greenlees made his Leicester debut against Old Blues on 20 March 1926 at Welford Road in the unusual position of scrum-half, Greenlees played 5 games in the position that season. 1926/27 season saw Greenlees in his more usual position of fly-half, starting 34 of the club's 41 matches in the position.

Greenlees Scotland debut came on 17 December 1927 against Australia at Murrayfield, the Scots prevailed 10–8, and Greenlees continued in the 1928 Five Nations as Scotland beat France however he was dropped from the side following defeat to Wales. This was Greenlees' only defeat in his 6 caps.

He was selected for the 1930 British Lions tour to New Zealand and Australia but was unable to take the time away from work. He was captain of Leicester from 1930 to 1932 and was top points scorer in the 1931/32 season.

== Sources ==
Farmer, Stuart & Hands, David Tigers-Official History of Leicester Football Club (The Rugby DevelopmentFoundation ISBN 978-0-9930213-0-5)
