= Moat Community College =

Location
- Maidstone Road; Leicester, Leicestershire, LE2 0TU; England; 52°37′59″N 1°07′11″W

Information
- Type: Community school
- Motto: Maximising Our Achievements Together
- Established: 1982
- Local authority: Leicester
- Department for Education URN: 120292 Tables
- Ofsted: Reports
- Principal: Brian Killeen
- Gender: Coeducational
- Age: 11 to 16
- Enrolment: 1052
- Colour: Mixed
- Former pupils: Old Moatians
- Website: https://moat.leicester.sch.uk/

Moat Community College is a coeducational secondary school in Highfields, near the city centre of Leicester, England.

== History ==
The school was opened in 1980 as an amalgamation of two local schools, Moat Boys School in Maidstone road, Highfields, Leicester, and Moat Girls School in Ventnor Street, Spinney Hill, Leicester. The current college building is built on the site of the old Hillcrest Hospital, in Maidstone Road, Highfields.

In the college's first year, due to building work not being completed, the college was divided over three sites, thus:

- New College, Maidstone Road – 2nd & 3rd years boys & girls mixed
- Boys' School, Melbourne Road – 4th & 5th year boys
- Girls' School, Ventnor Street – 1st year boys & girls mixed, 4th & 5th year girls

There was also a site (based in an old school) at Braunston in Rutland where activities could be run on field trips. Additionally, the school used playing fields near Brighton Avenue in Wigston, Leicestershire, for PE. Lines of buses at the three sites were common to transfer students to Wigston.

This also meant teachers were split between the three sites, traveling to and fro to teach at different locations in the same day.

It was not until August 1983 that the full college was operational and all pupils went to the Maidstone Road site.

The Boys School site went to Leicestershire County Council and community and youth projects were run from it. The Girls School site became Spinney Hill Primary School after the amalgamation of a small number of primary schools in the Spinney Hills area of Highfields (the lower ground floor was always occupied by Moat Infants School).

The original college badge was adopted from the one worn in both the boys and girls schools. (Red Castle) In 1982 a new badge was designed showing two castles and two interlinking C's to signify Moat Community College and the two schools the college was formed from. The motto then disappeared. A further development in its design was two C's one inside the other with a circle inside the smaller C, which contained the castle image.

The college was designated as a Science Specialist College in 2006.

== Ofsted judgements ==
As of 2021, the college's most recent Ofsted inspection was a short inspection in 2018, which found that the school remained Good.
