= Bob Stirling =

England international rugby union player

- Born: Robert Victor Stirling; 4 September 1919 Lichfield, Staffordshire
- Died: 15 January 1991 (aged 71) Halton, Buckinghamshire
- Occupation: RAF Officer

Rugby union career
- Position: Second Row/Prop
Senior career
Years	Team	Apps	(Points)
1948-1953	Leicester	75	(3)
1953-1954	Wasps		
International career
Years	Team	Apps	(Points)
1951-1954	England	18	(Pts:3; Tries:1)

Robert Victor Stirling (1919–1991) was an English rugby union player. He represented England from 1951 to 1954. He also captained his country. He played club rugby for Aylestone St James, Leicester Tigers and Wasps.

In his working life he was an RAF officer stationed at Cranwell.

== Rugby union career ==
Originally from Sheffield, Stirling was stationed mainly in India during the second World War & played station rugby at RAF Cranwell before joining Aylestone St James, a club local to Leicester, from there he progressed to Leicester Tigers' 'A' side and into the First XV in 1948. He made his club debut on 4 September 1948 at Welford Road against Bedford, and settled into the first team at lock forward. Stirling played for Leicester until his work in the Air Force saw him move to the Air Ministry in London, where Saturday morning work commitments meant continuing for Leicester was impossible. His final game for Leicester was on 4 April 1953, against Bristol on Leicester's Easter tour.

He played prop for the RAF after a suggestion from George Beamish, and in this position he gained all his England caps.

Stirling made his international debut on 20 January 1951 at St Helen's, Swansea in the Wales vs England match. Despite publicly speculating on retiring after the 1952-53 season, he was named as the England captain for the 1954 Five Nations Championship. He played his final match for England on 10 April 1954 at Colombes in the France vs England match. Of the 18 matches he played for his national side he was on the winning side on 10 occasions.
