= Jack Miles (rugby union) =

England international rugby union player

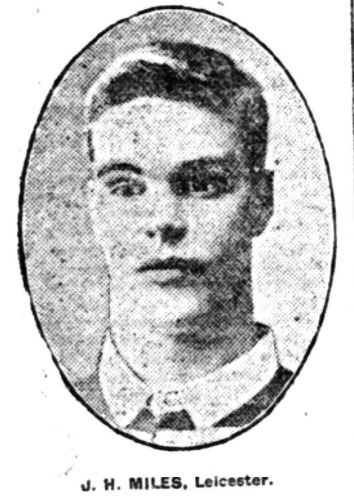
- Born: John Henry Miles; 14 February 1880 Grimsby, Lincolnshire, England
- Died: 23 January 1953 (aged 72) Sheffield, England

Rugby union career
- Position: Wing
Senior career
Years	Team	Apps	(Points)
1899–1904	Leicester Tigers	93	(223)
International career
Years	Team	Apps	(Points)
1903	England	1	

John Henry Miles (14 February 1880 – 23 February 1953) was a rugby union wing who played 93 times for Leicester Tigers between 1899 and 1904, scoring 75 tries for 223 points. Miles made his Leicester debut against Handsworth on 9 September 1899 scoring a hat trick. However that was not enough to keep his place in the team and he did not play again until 25 October 1899 against Bedford School where he scored 2 tries. He did not become a regular in the first team until the 1901/02 season where he scored 20 tries in 26 appearances; continuing that form he scored 14 tries in 17 games the next season to earn his England cap.

Miles made his international debut for England on 10 January 1903 against Wales at St Helens in Swansea. This made him the first home produced international for Leicester Tigers, having gone to Medway Street School and played for Stoneygate before joining Tigers.

Miles also played for Northampton Saints.

== Sources ==
Farmer, Stuart & Hands, David Tigers-Official History of Leicester Football Club (The Rugby DevelopmentFoundation ISBN 978-0-9930213-0-5)
