= Doug Norman =

England international rugby union player

- Born: Douglas James Norman; 12 June 1897 Leicester, England
- Died: 27 December 1971 (aged 74) Oadby, England
- Occupation: Print works

Rugby union career
- Position: Hooker
Senior career
Years	Team	Apps	(Points)
1920–33	Leicester Tigers	453	(131)
International career
Years	Team	Apps	(Points)
1932	England	2	(0)

Douglas James Norman (12 June 1897 - 27 December 1971) was a rugby union player who appeared in 453 games for Leicester Tigers between 1920–1933, and twice for England in 1932. He started his career playing as a flanker, but switched to the front row midway through his career and from then on played predominantly at hooker.

== Career ==
=== Beginnings ===
Norman learned his rugby at Medway Street School and was a school-boy international in 1911 captaining England to their first win over Wales. Norman served in the First World War with the Royal Artillery in Mesopotamia.

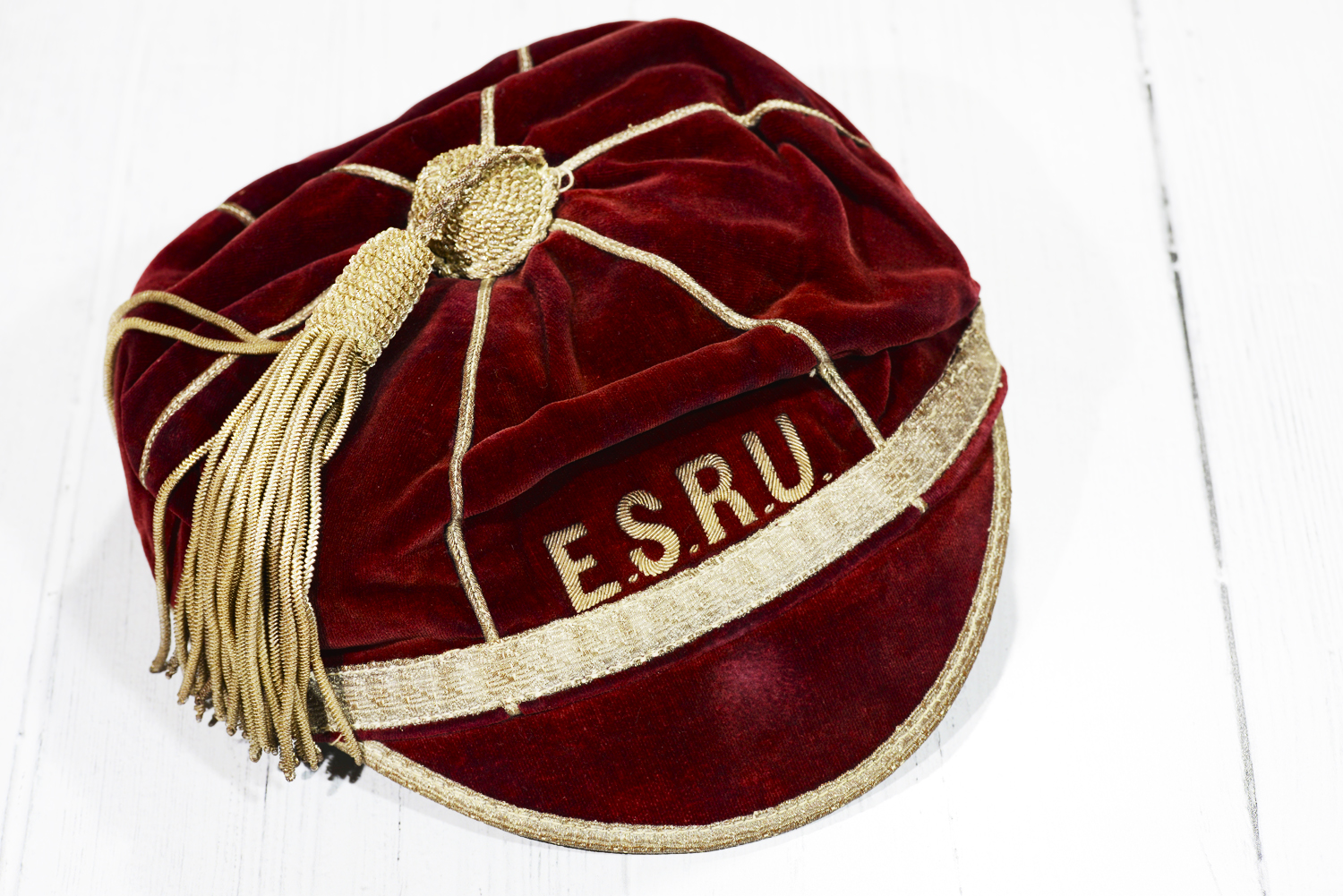
Doug Normans ESRU Cap from 1910-11

=== Leicester ===
Norman made his Leicester debut on 17 January 1920 at Welford Road against Headingley playing at flanker and scoring 3 conversions in a 54-11 win for Leicester. Norman featured a further eight times for the Tigers in the 1919/20 season scoring tries in away wins against Cardiff and Gloucester. Norman was then on a regular in the first team's back row starting over 30 games in six of next seven seasons. For the 1927/28 season Norman switched to the front row where he spent the second half of his career. Predominantly a hooker he also played games as a prop.

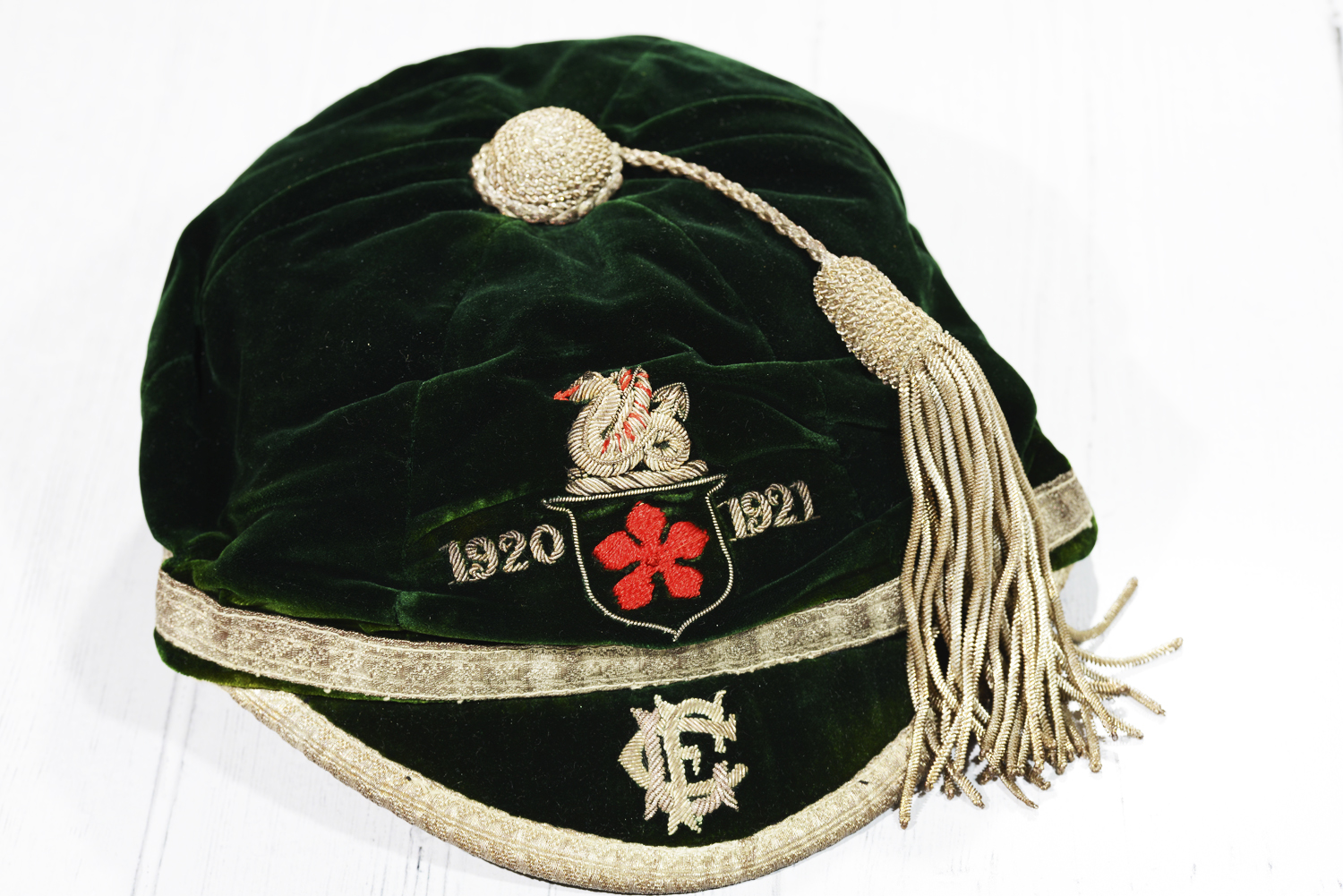
Doug's Leicester Football Club Cap from the 1920-21 Season

Norman's finest achievement was captaining Leicestershire and the East Midlands to a 30-21 victory over the touring South Africans– the Springboks–on 14 November 1931, the only defeat the side suffered on their tour. That performance earned him an England Test debut against the same opposition on 2 January 1932 at Twickenham. He also played two weeks later against Wales at St. Helen's in Swansea. England however lost both and Norman did not represent his country again.

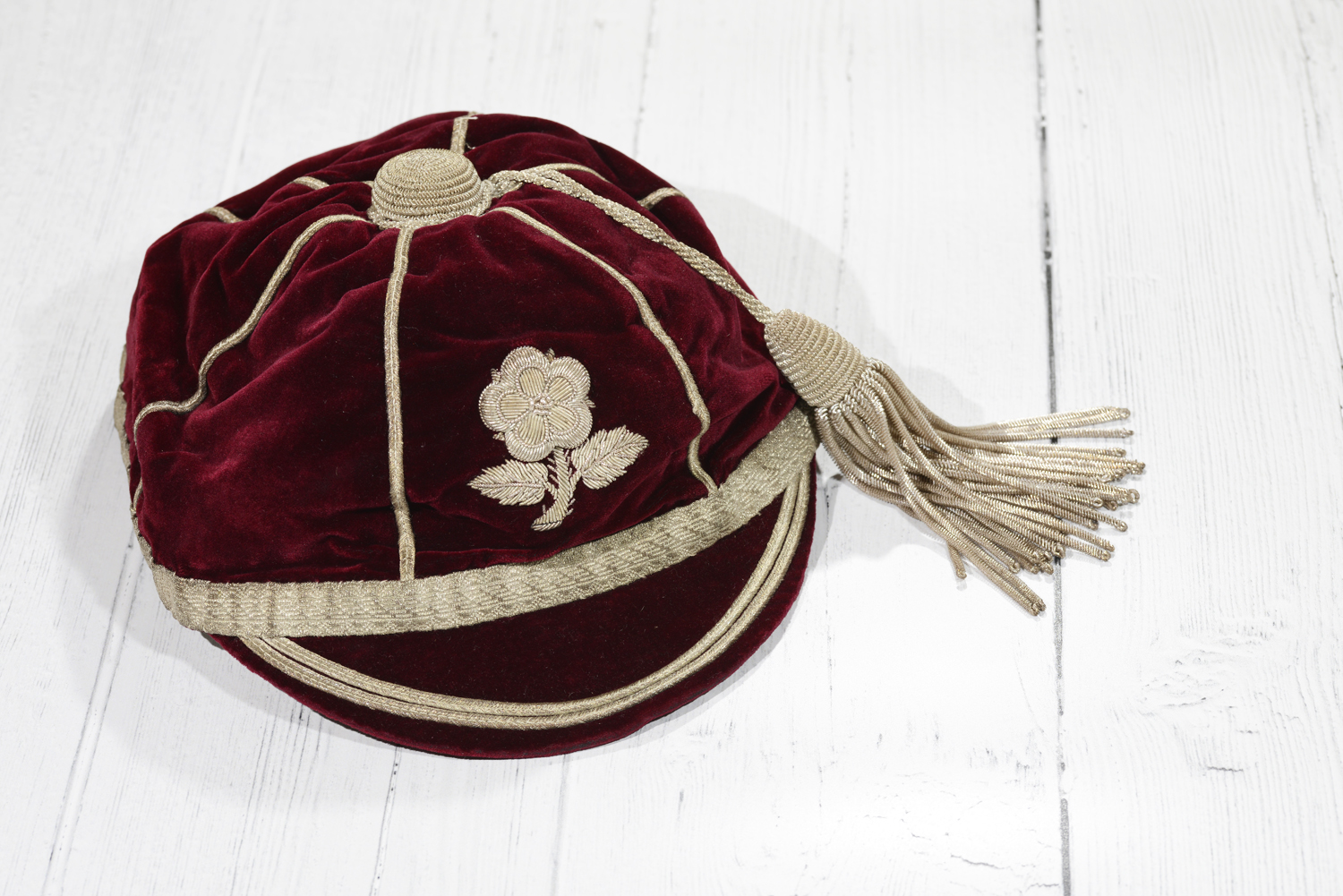
Doug Norman's England Cap from 1932

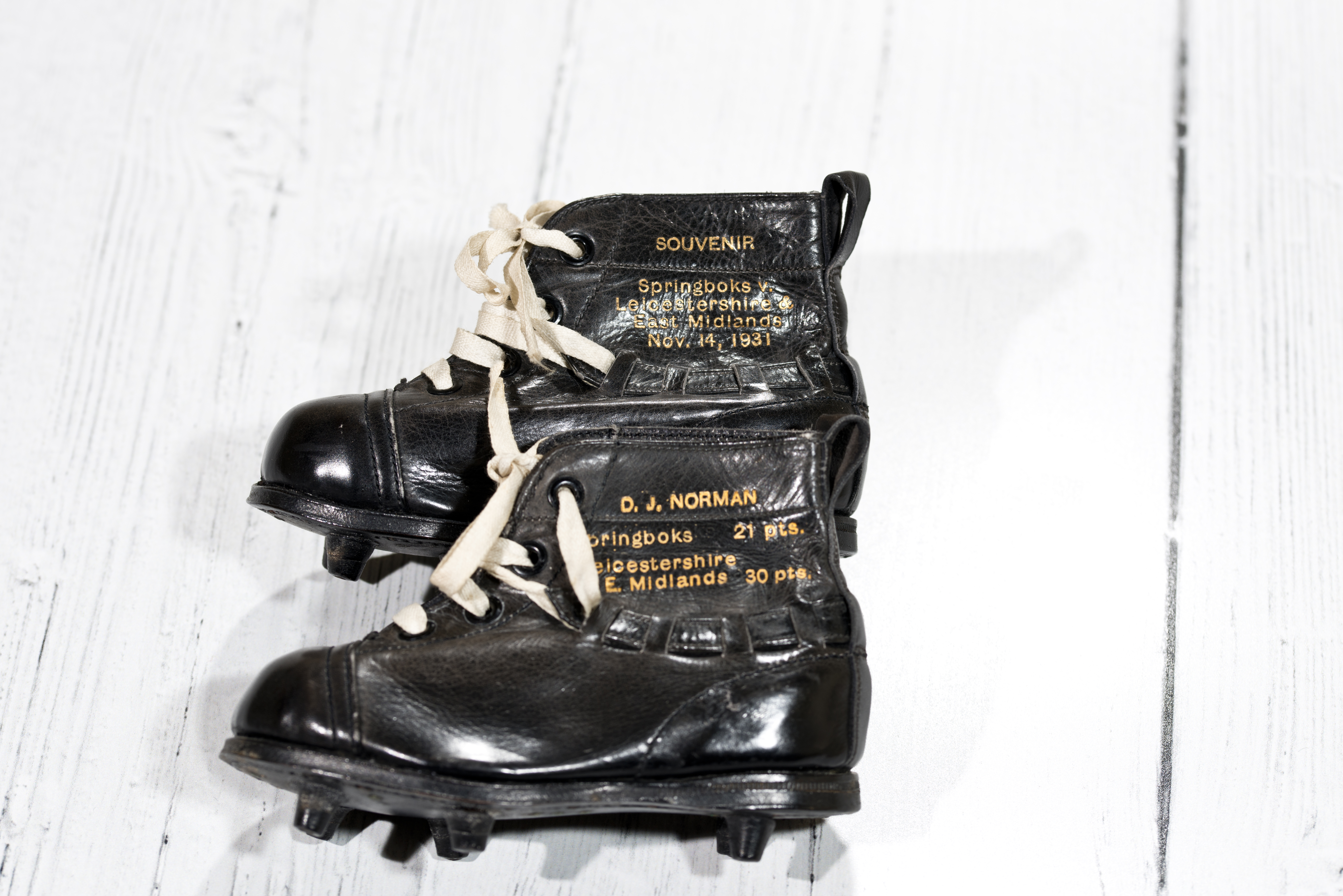
Miniature Rugby Boots commemorating the East Midlands victory over the Springboks.

=== Final season and retirement ===
The 1932/33 season was Norman's last and for it he was appointed as Leicester's captain. Unfortunately he was injured in the second game of the season against Old Blues, where he was substituted for the only time, and missed the next seven games. He returned to the side in October against Gloucester and played 24 games that the season. His final match for the Tigers was an 8-15 loss on Tuesday 18 April 1933 against Bath at The Recreation Ground.

Norman's 453 games place him fourth all time for most appearances, against Bath in on 5 September 1931 he became only the second player to play 400 games for the club. During the Second World War he was a member of the home guard and organised the Leicester Harlequins side, which became the base for the re-formed Tigers in 1945. He was president of Leicester Tigers between 1965 and 1968.

== Sources ==
- "Tigers ABC to Z: N is for New Zealand & the 90s". Leicester Tigers. 13 July 2015.
- Farmer, Stuart; Hands, David (2014). Tigers - Official history of Leicester Football Club. The Rugby Development Foundation. ISBN 978-0-9930213-0-5.
