= Richard Russell (rugby union) =

England international rugby union player

- Born: Richard Forbes Russell; 5 April 1879 Bingham, Nottinghamshire, England
- Died: 30 May 1960 (aged 81) Lezayre, Isle of Man

Rugby union career
- Position: Forward
Senior career
Years	Team	Apps	(Points)
1903–1913	Leicester Tigers	122	(157)
International career
Years	Team	Apps	(Points)
1905	England	1	

Richard Forbes Russell (5 April 1879 – 30 May 1960) was a rugby union forward who played 122 times for Leicester Tigers between 1903 and 1913 scoring 28 tries, 26 conversions and 7 penalties for 157 points. Russell made his Leicester debut against Devonport Albion on 19 September 1903 and quickly established himself in the side playing 29 times that season. Russell was a try scorer as Tigers won the Midlands Counties Cup in 1904 and also played in the 1905 cup winning side, during the 1904/05 season Russell was the club's top scorer with 57 points. Russell captained the club in the 1906/7 and 1907/8 seasons before his work as a school teacher took him to Cork. Russell played a further, his final, game for Tigers in 1913.

Russell made his international debut for England on 2 December 1905 in England's first international against New Zealand at Crystal Palace. It was his only cap for England.

== Sources ==
Farmer, Stuart & Hands, David Tigers-Official History of Leicester Football Club (The Rugby DevelopmentFoundation ISBN 978-0-9930213-0-5)
