= Jock Lawrie =

Scotland international rugby union player

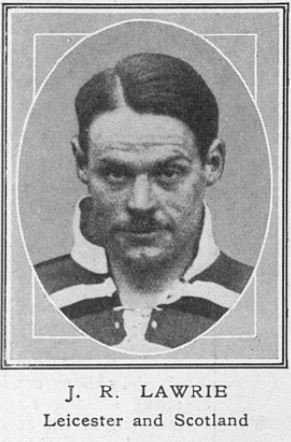
- Jock Lawrie in 1925 magazine portrait
- Born: John Ruthven Lawrie; 11 September 1900 Melrose, Scottish Borders
- Died: 7 July 1981 (aged 80) Folkestone, England

Rugby union career
- Position: Flanker
Amateur team(s)
Years	Team	Apps	(Points)
- Melrose
1923–26	Leicester Tigers	92	(39)
International career
Years	Team	Apps	(Points)
1922–24	Scotland	11	(0)

John Ruthven Lawrie (11 September 1900 – 7 July 1981) was a rugby union flanker who played 11 times for Scotland between 1922 and 1924. He played his club rugby for Leicester Tigers and Melrose.

Lawrie made his international debut for Scotland on 2 January 1922 against France at Colombes. In 1923 Lawrie transferred to Leicester making his debut on 1 September 1923 against Bath. On 2 February 1924 Lawrie played for Scotland against Wales and became the first non-English Leicester player selected for international duty.

== Sources ==
Farmer, Stuart & Hands, David Tigers-Official History of Leicester Football Club (The Rugby DevelopmentFoundation ISBN 978-0-9930213-0-5)
