= Bob Rowell =

English rugby union player

- Born: Robert Errington Rowell; 29 August 1939 (age 87) Corbridge, Northumberland
- School: Wymondham College
- University: Hull University; Loughborough College

Rugby union career
- Position: Lock
Senior career
Years	Team	Apps	(Points)
1962–1978	Leicester Tigers	355	(67)
1966–1967	Fylde		
1967–1969	Waterloo		
International career
Years	Team	Apps	(Points)
1964–1965	England	2	(0)

Robert Errington Rowell (born 29 August 1939) is an English retired rugby union player. His primary position was as a lock forward. He was capped twice by England; both times against Wales, the first on 18 January 1964 in a 6-6 draw in the 1964 Five Nations Championship at Twickenham, despite having never previously being so much as called up for a trial, and again a year later on 16 January 1965 in a 14–3 loss at the Cardiff Arms Park. He made 355 appearances for Leicester Tigers between 1962 and 1978; only Martin Johnson has played more times for Leicester at lock. He was Leicester captain for the 1976–1977 season, and president in 2003.
