= Alastair Smallwood =

England international rugby union player

- Born: Alastair McNaughton Smallwood; 18 November 1892 Alloa, Clackmannanshire, Scotland
- Died: 12 June 1985 (aged 92) Uppingham, England
- School: Newcastle Royal Grammar School
- University: Gonville and Caius College, Cambridge
- Occupation: School Teacher

Rugby union career
- Position: Wing
Senior career
Years	Team	Apps	(Points)
1920–1925	Leicester Tigers	64	(151)
International career
Years	Team	Apps	(Points)
1920–25	England	14	(25)

Alastair McNaughton Smallwood (18 November 1892 – 12 June 1985) was a rugby union wing who played 64 games for Leicester Tigers and 14 games for England between 1920 and 1925.

Smallwood was born in Scotland but educated at Newcastle Royal Grammar School and went to Gonville and Caius College, Cambridge on an organ scholarship. He played in the 1919 Varsity Match and scored a drop goal as Cambridge beat Oxford 7-5. This led to Smallwood making his England debut on 31 January 1920 against France in the 1920 Five Nations Championship.

Smallwood made his Leicester debut on 2 October 1920 at Welford Road against Headingley in a 33-3 win for the home side, this match was also the official opening of the Crumbie Stand. Smallwood was never a regular in the team playing only 12 games in that season and never featuring in more than 14 games in any individual season. Smallwood was prolific though scoring 47 tries in only 64 games including a record 7 tries in a single match, against Manchester R.F.C. on 30 December 1922.

In the book Rugger by Wavell Wakefield, a contemporary Tigers teammate, Smallwood was described as "one of the most enterprising, as well as one of the most cleverest, post-War backs" and credited with starting the tactic of wingers throwing into the lineout rather than scrum halves.

== Sources ==
Farmer, Stuart & Hands, David Tigers-Official History of Leicester Football Club (The Rugby DevelopmentFoundation ISBN 978-0-9930213-0-5)
