= Michael Wade (rugby union) =

England international rugby union player

Mike Wade
- Born: Michael Richard Wade; 13 September 1937 (age 89) Leicester, England
- School: Wyggeston Grammar School for Boys
- University: Emmanuel College, Cambridge

Rugby union career
- Position: Centre
Senior career
Years	Team	Apps	(Points)
1955–67	Leicester Tigers	166	(87)
- Correct as of July 2016
International career
Years	Team	Apps	(Points)
1962	England	3	(3)

Michael Richard Wade, commonly known as Mike Wade (born 13 September 1937, in Leicester) was a rugby union centre who played 166 games for Leicester Tigers between 1955 and 1967; he represented England 3 times in 1962. He was a Cambridge University blue captaining the side to victory in 1961.

Wade made his Tigers debut against Bedford on Christmas Eve 1955 as an 18-year-old whilst still at school, playing 3 games in four days during the club's Christmas festival also featuring against Birkenhead Park and the Barbarians. He then dropped out of the side until the end of the season where he played 3 of the final four games.

He was captain of the Cambridge University rugby team in their undefeated 1961 season winning 14 games including the Varsity Match. Wade was then capped three times for England in the 1962 Five Nations, making his debut against Wales he also featured against Ireland and France but was dropped for the Calcutta Cup match against Scotland, his clubmate at Leicester Horrocks-Taylor taking his place.

Wade was Tigers captain in 1963/64 and again in 1964/65 however he suffered an injury to his knee cartilage in a game against Richmond in November 1965. Effectively forcing him to retire he played only 3 more games for the club in January and February in 1967.
