= Paul Dodge =

England international rugby union player

- Born: Paul William Dodge; 26 February 1958 (age 68) Leicester, England

Rugby union career
- Position: Centre
Senior career
Years	Team	Apps	(Points)
1975–1991	Leicester Tigers	436	
International career
Years	Team	Apps	(Points)
1978–1985	England	32	(15)

Paul William Dodge (born 26 February 1958 in Leicester, England) is a former English rugby union international footballer who gained 32 caps for his country between 1978 and 1985. His Leicester Tigers career earned him 436 appearances.

Dodge started playing for his local club, Syston RFC, from where he progressed to join Tigers as a youth player and as a 17-year-old, made his first team debut in the annual Christmas fixture against the Barbarians. His England debut came two years later. With Clive Woodward he formed a centre partnership that played for Tigers, England and the British Lions tour to South Africa in 1980. In 1985 he captained England eight times and captained Tigers in the 1987/88 season. After retiring he became Leicester backs coach between 1993 and 1996 before becoming an academy coach in 1998.

Sporting positions
Preceded by Nigel Melville	English National Rugby Union Captain; 1985	Succeeded by Nigel Melville
