= Percy Lawrie (rugby union) =

England international rugby union player

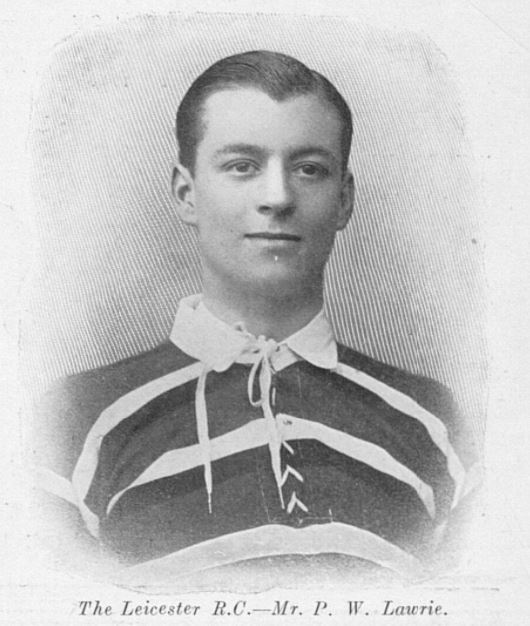
- Photographic portrait of Lawrie in 1910
- Born: Percy William Lawrie; 26 September 1888 Lutterworth, Leicestershire, England
- Died: 27 December 1956 (aged 68) Leicester, England
- School: Wyggeston School
- Occupation: Accountant

Rugby union career
- Position: Wing
Senior career
Years	Team	Apps	(Points)
1907–24	Leicester Tigers	318	(727)
International career
Years	Team	Apps	(Points)
1910–11	England	2	(3)

Percy William Lawrie (26 September 1888 – 27 December 1956) was a rugby union wing who played 318 games for Leicester Tigers between 1907 and 1924 and twice for England between 1910 and 1911.

Lawrie is Leicester's leading try scorer with 206 tries, more than 30 ahead of nearest challenger Barry Evans; Lawrie broke the previous record of 153 on Boxing Day 1918, Leicester's first game after the Great War, against Leicestershire's 4th Battalion. He was the club's top try scorer for six successive seasons between 1908–14 and became the first Leicester player to score a hat trick against the Barbarians.

Lawrie was captain of Leicester for 165 games between 1911–14 and then again between 1920–23 this was a record which stood until 2004 when Martin Johnson over took him.

Lawrie made his international debut for England on 19 March 1910 against Scotland at Inverleith in the last game of the 1910 Five Nations Championship. His only other England cap was the next year against the same opponents at Twickenham where he scored a try.

During the war Lawrie served as a lieutenant in the Royal Artillery and following his retirement from playing rugby in 1924 he served on Leicester's committee until ill health forced his retirement in 1954. He died 2 years later on 27 December 1956 just half an hour before Leicester played the Barbarians.

On 9 February 2011 Lawrie was named 59 in Leicestershire's 100 Sporting Greats by the Leicester Mercury.

== Sources ==
Farmer, Stuart & Hands, David Tigers-Official History of Leicester Football Club (The Rugby DevelopmentFoundation ISBN 978-0-9930213-0-5)

L is for Lawrie
