= Leicester Tigers =

English rugby union club, based in Leicester

- Full name: Leicester Football Club
- Nickname: Tigers
- Founded: 3 August 1880; 146 years ago
- Location: Leicester, England
- Ground: Mattioli Woods Welford Road (Capacity: 25,849)
- Chairman: Peter Tom
- CEO: Andrea Pinchen
- Coach: Geoff Parling
- Captain: Ollie Chessum
- Most appearances: David Matthews (502)
- Top scorer: Dusty Hare (4,507)
- Most tries: Percy Lawrie (206)
- League: PREM Rugby
- 2025–26: 4th of 10 (lost play-off semi-final)
1st kit	2nd kit

First match
- 28 October 1880; 0–0 v Moseley

Largest win
- 100–0 v Liverpool St Helens, 11 April 1992

Largest defeat
- 10–85 v Barbarians, 4 June 2000

Official website
- leicestertigers.com

Leicester Tigers (officially Leicester Football Club) are a professional rugby union club based in Leicester, England. They play in PREM Rugby, England's top division of rugby.

The club was founded in 1880 and since 1892 plays its home matches at Mattioli Woods Welford Road in the south of the city. The club has been known by the nickname Tigers since at least 1885. In the 2024–25 Premiership Rugby season, Tigers finished 2nd, losing the Premiership final, this entitled them to compete in the 2025–26 European Rugby Champions Cup. The current head coach is Geoff Parling, who joined for the 2025–26 Premiership Rugby season.

Leicester have won 22 major titles. They were European Champions twice, back-to-back in 2001 and 2002; have won a record 11 English Championships, five RFU Knockout Cups, three Anglo-Welsh Cups, and most recently the PREM Rugby Cup in 2026. Leicester most recently won the Premiership Rugby title in the 2022 season, and appeared in a record nine successive Premiership finals, from 2005 to 2013. Leicester is one of only three teams never to have been relegated from the top division. Leicester have appeared in five European finals, the third most overall; as well as the two victories, they have also lost finals three times, in 1997, 2007 and 2009. In 2021, they played in the European Rugby Challenge Cup final.

Six Leicester Tigers players were members of the 2003 Rugby World Cup final-winning England side, including captain Martin Johnson.

== History ==
=== Foundation and Tom Crumbie era (1880–1928) ===
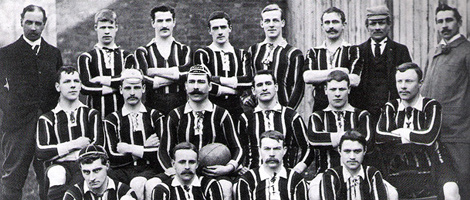
Leicester Tigers in 1894

Leicester Football Club was formed on 3 August 1880 by the merger of three smaller teams: Leicester Athletic Society, Leicester Amateurs and Leicester Alert. The club's first game was a scoreless draw on 23 October against Moseley at the Belgrave Road Cycle and Cricket Ground. On 10 September 1892, Leicester played their first game at Welford Road against a Leicestershire XV.

Tom Crumbie was appointed secretary on 2 August 1895, a position he held for the next 33 years. Crumbie has been credited with dragging the club to national prominence. He disbanded the reserve and third teams, making the First XV an invitation side and introducing players from all over the country. Tigers first silverware was the Midlands Counties Cup won for the first time in 1898 against Moseley. Having won the Midlands Counties Cup every year from 1898 to 1905, they dropped out "to give other teams a chance". On their return to the competition in 1909, Tigers won the cup again.

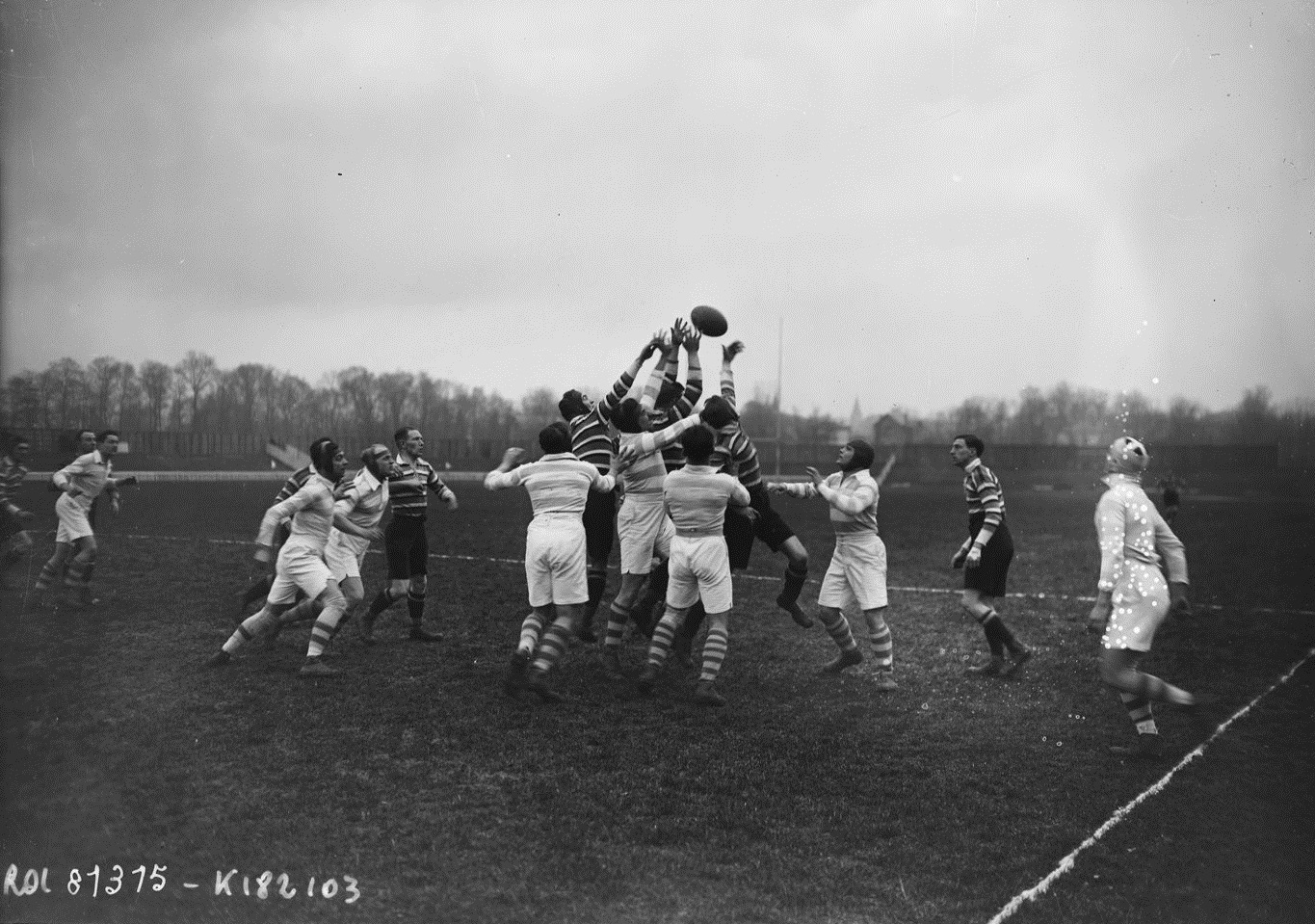
Leicester's match against Racing club de France in February 1923

In 1903, Jack Miles became the first home-produced England international. Leicester's status as a premier club was confirmed in 1905 when a crowd of 20,000 was on hand to see the club face The Original All Blacks, losing 28–0. December 1909 saw Tigers play the Barbarians for the first time, holding them to a 9–9 draw. The fixture became a vital feature in the club's calendar, delivering large attendances until open professionalism and league rugby in the 1990s forced it to gradually be abandoned due to fixture congestion. Tigers won the Midlands Counties Cup three more times in four years to cement their place as the midland's premier side before the outbreak of war in 1914. The visit of the Invincible All Blacks on 4 October 1924 saw a record attendance at Welford Road of 35,000 that stands to this day. Tigers were beaten 27–0 by the tourists.

=== Lions captains, decline and club restructure (1928–1971) ===
Club captain Doug Prentice captained the 1930 British Lions tour to New Zealand and Australia. The first BBC radio broadcast of a Tigers game was against Waterloo on 29 November 1930; Tigers won 21–5. Bernard Gadney became the club's first home-produced England captain in 1934 and was captain when four Leicester players were part of the first England side to beat the All Blacks. Gadney also became the club's second player to captain the British Lions on their tour to Argentina. 1936–37 was the worst season since 1889–90 for the club with only 14 wins from 39 matches.

Tigers first televised game by the BBC was on 3 February 1951 when they beat London Scottish 14–0 at the Richmond Athletic Ground. The club underwent a significant restructure in the 1956–57 season. The practice of being an "invitation" club featuring only a First XV stopped and Tigers adopted a more traditional membership club based approach with multiple sides. The "A XV" was to be re-introduced under the name "Extra First XV" with a third "Colts XV" also formed. The 1963–64 season saw David Matthews set the record for most consecutive appearances for the club with 109. Matthews was to become captain in 1965 and in 1966/67 lead the club to a record 33 wins. Chalkie White became coach in 1968; the same season Tom Berry became Leicester's first president of the RFU. White was credited with revolutionising Leicester's players in response to rule changes that opened up the game. 1970/71 saw Peter Wheeler emerge as first-choice hooker having made his debut the year before, he ended the season on England's tour to the Far East. Attendance for the annual Barbarians game hit a nadir with a crowd of only 2,518.

=== Introduction of competitions (1971–1978) ===
The 1971/72 season saw changes that would radically change both the club and the game. The RFU introduced a national Knockout Cup competition for clubs and on 16 November 1971 Tigers played their first competitive cup match since 1914, a 10–3 defeat to Nottingham at their Beeston ground. Also introduced that season was Tigers' first "Youth" XV, based on a collection of the best 14- and 15-year-olds in the county. Only six years later, Paul Dodge became the first graduate to win an international cap.

Tigers were not involved in the 1974–75 Cup and lost in the 1st round of the 1975–76 Cup. This forced the club into the Midlands qualifiers for the only time. This era saw a huge increase in the popularity of the Barbarians annual fixture with crowds of 15,000 in 1973 & 1975, 17,000 in 1974 and 21,000 in 1976. This contrasted with usual crowds in the low hundreds. 1976–77 saw the introduction of regional "Merit Tables" by the RFU, the first step on the road to full leagues. Based around traditional fixtures, Tigers finished second to Moseley in the Midlands Merit Table with a record of played 8 won 6. It took six years before Leicester were drawn at home in the cup but in 1977–78 they received four in a row on their way to a first Twickenham final against Gloucester. The game ended in a 6–3 loss to the Cherry and Whites; the attendance was 25,282 – more than double the previous season. Cup success also coincided with Tigers' membership more than doubling from 750 in 1978 to 2,000 by the end of 1979.

=== Centenary and cup and league success (1979–1988) ===
Leicester secured their first national trophy, the 1978–79 John Player Cup, by defeating Moseley 15–12. Tigers retained the cup in 1979–80 beating London Irish 21–9 at Twickenham in front of a record crowd of 27,000. 1979–80 also saw Tigers win the Midlands Merit Table for the first time. To celebrate the club's centenary a six-match tour to Australia and Fiji was arranged in August 1980, the first undertaken by an English club in the southern hemisphere. Prestige fixtures staged at Welford Road to mark the centenary were the visit of the Irish Wolfhounds, Romania, and Queensland. Tigers retained the Midlands Merit Table title in November with an undefeated record. On 25 April 1981, Tigers' Dusty Hare broke the world record for points scored in first-class fixtures with 3,658 points. Leicester retained the cup in 1980–81 by beating Gosforth 22–15.

Leicester was knocked out in the semi-finals of the 1982 Cup. This was also Chalkie White's last season with the club after 30 years as a player, administrator or coach. A new generation of players debuted in the early '80s: Dean Richards, John Wells, and Rory Underwood. In 1985, in the penultimate step towards league rugby, the Merit Table A was launched for two seasons where Tigers finished fourth and second. League rugby was launched in England with the 1987–88 Courage League and all sides now played all other sides in a round-robin. Tigers lost only one match all season and the end of the 1987–88 season Tigers became England's first official champions.

Tigers finished the 1988–89 Courage League in sixth place, their joint-worst ever finish. During the late 1980s and early 1990s, several key members of the Leicester pack came through the youth ranks and became key first-team contributors, most notably lock Martin Johnson who debuted in 1989 and later became club captain; flanker Neil Back who joined in 1990; and the front row trio of Graham Rowntree, Richard Cockerill, and Darren Garforth, who started 166 games together between 1992 and 2002.

=== Professional and European success (1993–2003) ===
From 1993 to 2002, Leicester enjoyed a remarkable nine trophies in ten years. This streak started when Leicester won the 1993 Pilkington Cup. In 1993/94 Tigers finished runners up in the Courage League to Bath. Leicester finished as Courage League champion in 1994–95.

The advent of the 1995–96 season brought two important changes: rugby union (and consequently the Tigers) became professional, and European club competition began in the form of the Heineken cup. The 1995/96 season was another of just missing out to perennial rivals Bath, who secured a league and cup double after defeating Leicester in the Pilkington Cup final. In Leicester's debut season in the Heineken Cup, the team reached the final, losing 28–9 against Brive. Leicester won the 1997 Pilkington Cup Final 9–3 against Sale. That summer Martin Johnson was named as captain for the 1997 British Lions tour to South Africa. In February 1998, Dean Richards was appointed as Director of Rugby following Bob Dwyer's sacking.

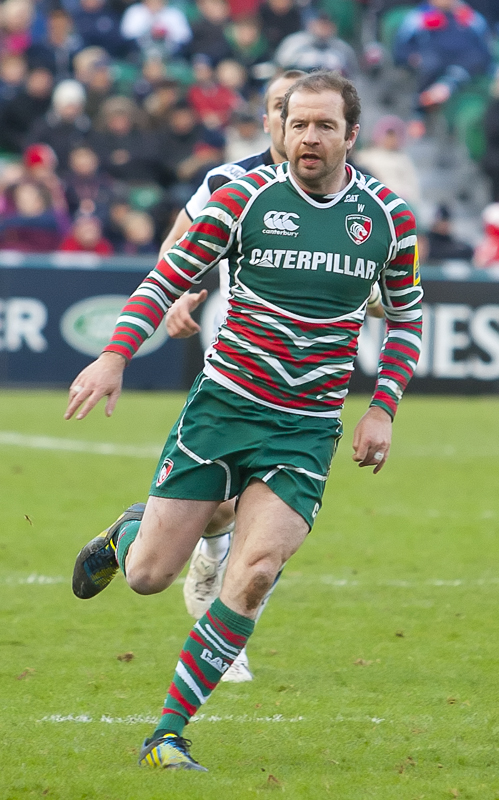
Geordan Murphy, pictured in 2012, played 322 games for Leicester between 1997 and 2013. He is the most decorated player in the club's history with 8 Premiership titles, 2 European titles and 2 Anglo-Welsh cups.

Under Richards, Leicester entered a golden age, winning four consecutive Premiership Rugby titles in 1999, 2000, 2001 and 2002, as well as back to back Heineken Cups in 2001 and 2002. During the 1998–99 Premiership, the Tigers title was sealed in the penultimate match of the season. In the 1999–2000 Premiership season Leicester retained their title. Tigers' third successive Premiership title was sealed early on 17 March 2001. In the 2001 Heineken Cup final Tigers beat Stade Français Paris 34–30 to secure the club's first continental title. Tigers had won the inaugural Premiership playoffs the week before so also sealed an unprecedented treble. That summer, Martin Johnson was named captain for the 2001 British & Irish Lions tour to Australia, becoming the first man to lead two tours.

Leicester became the first side to retain a European title after beating Munster 15–9 in the 2002 Heineken Cup Final. Leicester also retained their fourth successive Premiership title in 2002. This brought the club's total to six championships, tying Bath's record. During this time, Leicester went 57 games unbeaten at home from 30 December 1997 to 30 November 2002 and earned 52 successive wins. During these four seasons, Leicester lost only 14 games out of the 92 they played.

During the 2003–04 season, Leicester's form suffered and with eight games left in the season Dean Richards was sacked. After Richards' departure Tigers turned to his assistant coach John Wells, who guided Leicester to the regular season top of the league in his only full season. In Martin Johnson and Neil Back's last game for Leicester they lost the Premiership Final to London Wasps.

=== Premiership success (2004–2013) ===
Pat Howard succeeded Wells as the head coach. Howard coached the club for two seasons, losing a Premiership final to Sale in his first season. Over the summer of 2006, the core of a new pack was recruited, and in Howard's second season Leicester won their first piece of silverware for five years, winning the Anglo-Welsh Cup, and sealed the club's first domestic league and cup double after winning the Premiership final 44–16 against Gloucester. However, Leicester lost the Heineken Cup final to Wasps. Howard left the club at the end of the season.

Howard was succeeded for one season by Marcelo Loffreda, the coach of Argentina, who started after the 2007 Rugby World Cup. Loffreda had a torrid time in charge despite getting to two finals. After losing the Anglo Welsh Cup final to the Ospreys, Leicester became the first side to win an away game in the Premiership playoffs by beating Gloucester in the semi-finals, but lost to Wasps in the final. After this final, Loffreda was sacked.

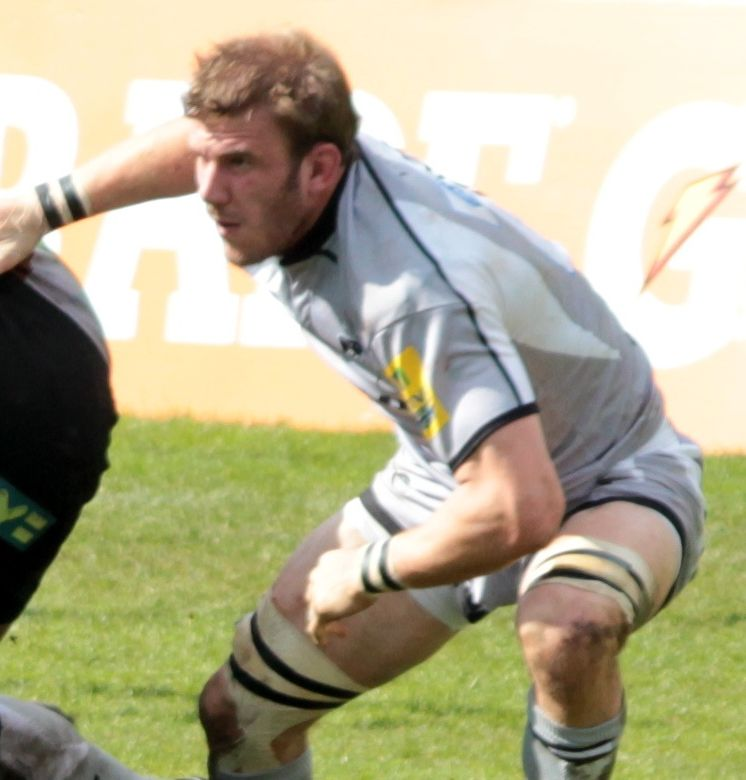
Tom Croft made his debut in 2006 after coming through the club's academy, he played 173 games before retiring in 2017

Heyneke Meyer was the board's choice to replace Loffreda, but family circumstances led to his resignation. Richard Cockerill took over, the appointment was confirmed as permanent on 17 April 2009. Cockerill lead Leicester to two Premiership titles in as many years. In the 2009 Premiership final Leicester beat London Irish 10–9, and Tigers retained their title the following year as they defeated Saracens 33–27. After an historic placing kicking competition decided the 2009 Heineken Cup semi-final, Leicester lost the 2009 Heineken Cup final to Irish province Leinster. On Friday 6 November 2009, Leicester hosted the world champion Springboks of South Africa and the young Leicester side triumphed 22–17.

Domestic success continued with Tigers reaching Premiership finals but losing in 2011 and 2012, against Saracens and Harlequins respectively, and winning the 2012 LV Cup. In 2013, Tigers won their record extending 10th English title, defeating local rivals Northampton Saints 37–17.

=== Championship drought (2013–2020) ===
The next year, Northampton beat Tigers 21–20 in the Premiership semi final at Franklin's Gardens. The next two years, Tigers suffered heavy away defeats in the semi-finals to Bath (47–10) and Saracens (44–17).

On Monday 2 January 2017, Leicester sacked Richard Cockerill as Director of Rugby. Aaron Mauger was placed in temporary charge of the team, winning the 2017 Anglo-Welsh Cup, until Matt O'Connor was announced as the new head coach. Under O'Connor, Tigers secured their 13th consecutive playoff appearance where they lost narrowly to Wasps 21–20. In the 2017–18 season successive home defeats to Northampton and Newcastle in Leicester's final two home games saw Tigers miss the playoffs for the first time since 2005. After a 40–6 defeat in the opening game of the 2018–19 Premiership Rugby season O'Connor was sacked by the club with immediate effect. Geordan Murphy was placed in charge of the side on an interim basis. Murphy was then made the permanent head coach on 18 December 2018 despite the team being on an eight match losing run. Results did not improve and a final day defeat against Bath saw Leicester finish 11th in the Premiership, their worst ever finish.

After a delayed start to the season due to the 2019 Rugby World Cup, Tigers fortunes did not improve and, on 21 January 2020, it was announced after months of speculation that England's forwards coach Steve Borthwick would join the club as head coach once his duties with England were finished. His start was later confirmed as July 2020.

On 16 March 2020, the 2019–20 Premiership Rugby season was suspended for five weeks due to the COVID-19 pandemic in the United Kingdom, with group training suspended indefinitely on 23 March. After the cancellation of games the club implemented 25% wage cuts on all staff, including players, on 22 April 2020 it was reported that Tigers players were unhappy with this and had engaged a solicitor to represent them, though this was quickly denied, on 11 May 2020 CEO Simon Cohen left the club after an 8-year tenure and was replaced by Andrea Pinchen. On 4 June 2020, it was revealed that Tigers were set to lose up to £5m of revenue during the coronavirus enforced shutdown, eventually making 31 employees redundant. On 29 June, it was reported that the pay dispute, which started in April, could result in several players leaving the club after refusing to cut their pay, with five players, including Manu Tuilagi and Telusa Veainu, leaving later that week after refusing to amend their contracts in light of the global pandemic.

The completion of the delayed 2019–20 Premiership Rugby season between August and October saw another 11th-place finish for Leicester, saved from relegation only by a points deduction from Saracens for breaching the salary cap. On 13 November 2020, just eight days before the start of the 2020–21 Premiership Rugby season Geordan Murphy left as director of rugby in a decision described as "mutual".

=== Borthwick in charge (2020–2022) ===
With new head coach Steve Borthwick now in charge of team selection, Leicester got off to a winning start against Gloucester. In his first season at the club Borthwick guided Leicester to the 2020–21 European Rugby Challenge Cup final and 6th place in the league, securing Champions Cup rugby for the first time in two years.

Tigers started the following season strongly, five wins in the opening five rounds was the club's best start in the Premiership era, the club remained unbeaten for 15 games in all competitions, the second best start to a season ever, but failed to tie the record after losing to Wasps on 9 January 2022. A week later, Leicester overcame an 18-point deficit in the second half to beat Connacht, a Hosea Saumaki try sealing the win on the final play of the game, and secure progress to their first Champions Cup knock out stages since 2016.

In Europe, Leicester progressed past Clermont Auvergne over two legs, despite getting red cards in both matches, but lost at home to Leinster 23–14, after falling behind 20–0 in the first half to the Irish side.

Domestically, they secured a first home play-off semi final since 2013, with two games to spare, after a 56–26 win against Bristol Bears. Tigers' winger Chris Ashton broke the Premiership Rugby all-time try scoring record in this match, his hat-trick taking him to 95 career league tries. In the semi-final, they faced local rivals Northampton Saints, but much of the build up was focused on recently retired former captain Tom Youngs whose wife, Tiffany, died from cancer in the week preceding the match. His brother Ben Youngs started the match, and it was his half back partner George Ford who inspired the victory scoring a "full house" with a try, conversion, penalty & drop goal for 22 points in a 27–13 win.

In the final, Leicester faced Saracens, a re-match of the 2010 & 2011 finals. Ford wasn't to last long in the final withdrawing injured in the 23rd minute & being replaced by Freddie Burns. With the matching tied 12–12 it was Burns who scored the 80th-minute drop goal to win Leicester their 11th English title, only two seasons after finishing in 11th place.

Speculation began that Borthwick was in line to succeed Eddie Jones as England head coach after the 2023 Rugby World Cup, but after a poor 2022 Autumn internationals, Jones was replaced by Borthwick on 19 December 2022. He was initially replaced as Leicester head coach in an interim capacity by Richard Wigglesworth, the club's starting scrum half in the 2022 Premiership final and previous attack coach. On 22 February 2023, it was announced that Dan McKellar would take the role on a full time basis from 1 July 2023, previously having been Australia's forwards coach.

=== Coaching instability (2023–) ===
After a single season, the third worst in the club's league history, McKellar was dismissed on 22 June 2024. On 27 June 2024, Tigers appointed fellow Australian Michael Cheika as the new head coach on an initial one-year deal. In February 2025, it was announced that Cheika himself would be stepping down following the conclusion of his contract at the end of the 2024–25 season. Former Leicester prop and ex-Munster head coach Graham Rowntree was the rumoured frontrunner to replace him for the following season. Leicester were reported to have agreed terms with Paul Gustard and to have made an offer to Leon MacDonald, before on 12 May 2025, it was confirmed that former England and Lions second-row Geoff Parling would succeed Cheika as the new head coach of Leicester Tigers on a long-term deal from the 2025–26 season.

Leicester finished the regular season in 2nd, beating Newcastle on the final day to secure a home play off semi-final. They beat Sale 21–16, taking a half-time lead through two tries from Adam Radwan, before Sale drew level through former-Tiger George Ford, Izaia Perese scored the winning try with his first touch breaking from 40 meters out. Tigers lost the final 23–21 against Bath, with coach Cheika highlighting what he felt was poor refereeing in several areas of the match.

== Women's team ==
Leicester Tigers formed a women's team on 15 July 2021, launched in partnership with Lichfield Ladies.

== Season summary ==
Season	League				Domestic cup		European cup	
Season	Competition	Position	Points	Play-offs	Competition	Performance	Competition	Performance
1971–72					John Player Cup	1st round		
1972–73					John Player Cup	Quarter-final		
1973–74					John Player Cup	1st round		
1974–75					John Player Cup	Did not qualify		
1975–76					John Player Cup	1st round		
1976–77	Midlands Merit	2nd	75%		John Player Cup	2nd round		
1977–78	Midlands Merit	5th	62.5%		John Player Cup	Finalist		
1978–79	Midlands Merit	2nd	85.7%		John Player Cup	Champions		
1979–80	Midlands Merit	1st	85.7%		John Player Cup	Champions		
1980–81	Midlands Merit	1st	92.9%		John Player Cup	Champions		
1981–82	Midlands Merit	1st	85.7%		John Player Cup	Semi-final		
1982–83	Midlands Merit	1st	100%		John Player Cup	Finalist		
1983–84	Midlands Merit	1st	100%		John Player Cup	3rd round		
1984–85	National Merit A Midlands Merit	6th 3rd	42.9% 85.7%		John Player Cup	Quarter-final		
1985–86	National Merit A	4th	70%		John Player Cup	Semi-final		
1986–87	National Merit A	2nd	75%		John Player Cup	Semi-final		
1987–88	Courage League Division 1	1st	37		John Player Cup	4th round		
1988–89	Courage League Division 1	6th	13		Pilkington Cup	Finalist		
1989–90	Courage League Division 1	5th	12		Pilkington Cup	Quarter-final		
1990–91	Courage League Division 1	4th	16		Pilkington Cup	4th round		
1991–92	Courage League Division 1	6th	13		Pilkington Cup	Semi-final		
1992–93	Courage League Division 1	3rd	18		Pilkington Cup	Champions		
1993–94	Courage League Division 1	2nd	28		Pilkington Cup	Finalist		
1994–95	Courage League Division 1	1st	31		Pilkington Cup	Semi-final		
1995–96	Courage League Division 1	2nd	30		Pilkington Cup	Finalist		
1996–97	Courage League Division 1	4th	29		Pilkington Cup	Champions	Heineken Cup	Finalist
1997–98	Premiership	4th	26		Tetley's Bitter Cup	5th round	Heineken Cup	Quarter-final
1998–99	Premiership	1st	44		Tetley's Bitter Cup	Quarter-final	Did not enter	N/A
1999–2000	Premiership	1st	51		Tetley's Bitter Cup	5th round	Heineken Cup	Group stage
2000–01	Premiership	1st	81	Champions*	Tetley's Bitter Cup	Semi-final	Heineken Cup	Champions
2001–02	Premiership	1st	83	Quarter-final*	Powergen Cup	Quarter-final	Heineken Cup	Champions
2002–03	Premiership	6th	55	Wildcard winner	Powergen Cup	Semi-final	Heineken Cup	Quarter-final
2003–04	Premiership	5th	55	Wildcard winner	Powergen Cup	6th round	Heineken Cup	Group stage
2004–05	Premiership	1st	78	Finalist	Powergen Cup	6th round	Heineken Cup	Semi-final
2005–06	Premiership	2nd	68	Finalist	Powergen Cup	Semi-final	Heineken Cup	Quarter-final
2006–07	Premiership	2nd	71	Champions	EDF Energy Cup	Champions	Heineken Cup	Finalist
2007–08	Premiership	4th	64	Finalist	EDF Energy Cup	Finalist	Heineken Cup	Group stage
2008–09	Premiership	1st	71	Champions	EDF Energy Cup	Group stage	Heineken Cup	Finalist
2009–10	Premiership	1st	73	Champions	LV Cup	Group stage	Heineken Cup	Group stage
2010–11	Premiership	1st	78	Finalist	LV Cup	Group stage	Heineken Cup	Quarter-final
2011–12	Premiership	2nd	74	Finalist	LV Cup	Champions	Heineken Cup	Group stage
2012–13	Premiership	2nd	74	Champions	LV Cup	Group stage	Heineken Cup	Quarter-final
2013–14	Premiership	3rd	74	Semi-final	LV Cup	Group stage	Heineken Cup	Quarter-final
2014–15	Premiership	3rd	68	Semi-final	LV Cup	Semi-final	Champions Cup	Group stage
2015–16	Premiership	4th	65	Semi-final	None	N/A	Champions Cup	Semi-final
2016–17	Premiership	4th	66	Semi-final	Anglo-Welsh Cup	Champions	Champions Cup	Group stage
2017–18	Premiership	5th	63	Did not qualify	Anglo-Welsh Cup	Group stage	Champions Cup	Group stage
2018–19	Premiership	11th	41	Did not qualify	Premiership Rugby Cup	Group stage	Champions Cup	Group stage
2019–20	Premiership	11th	29	Did not qualify	Premiership Rugby Cup	Group stage	Challenge Cup	Semi-final
2020–21	Premiership	6th	54	Did not qualify	No competition	N/A	Challenge Cup	Finalist
2021–22	Premiership	1st	94	Champions	Premiership Cup	Semi-final	Champions Cup	Quarter-final
2022–23	Premiership	3rd	59	Semi-final	Premiership Cup	Group stage	Champions Cup	Quarter–final
2023–24	Premiership	8th	45	Did not qualify	Premiership Cup	Finalist	Champions Cup	Round of 16
2024–25	Premiership	2nd	61	Finalist	Premiership Cup	Group stage	Champions Cup	Round of 16
2025–26	Premiership	4th	63	Semi-final	Premiership Cup	Champions	Champions Cup	Round of 16

* In 2001 & 2002, the winners of the league were considered champions with the winners of the playoffs considered champions from 2003 onward.

=== Premiership play-offs ===
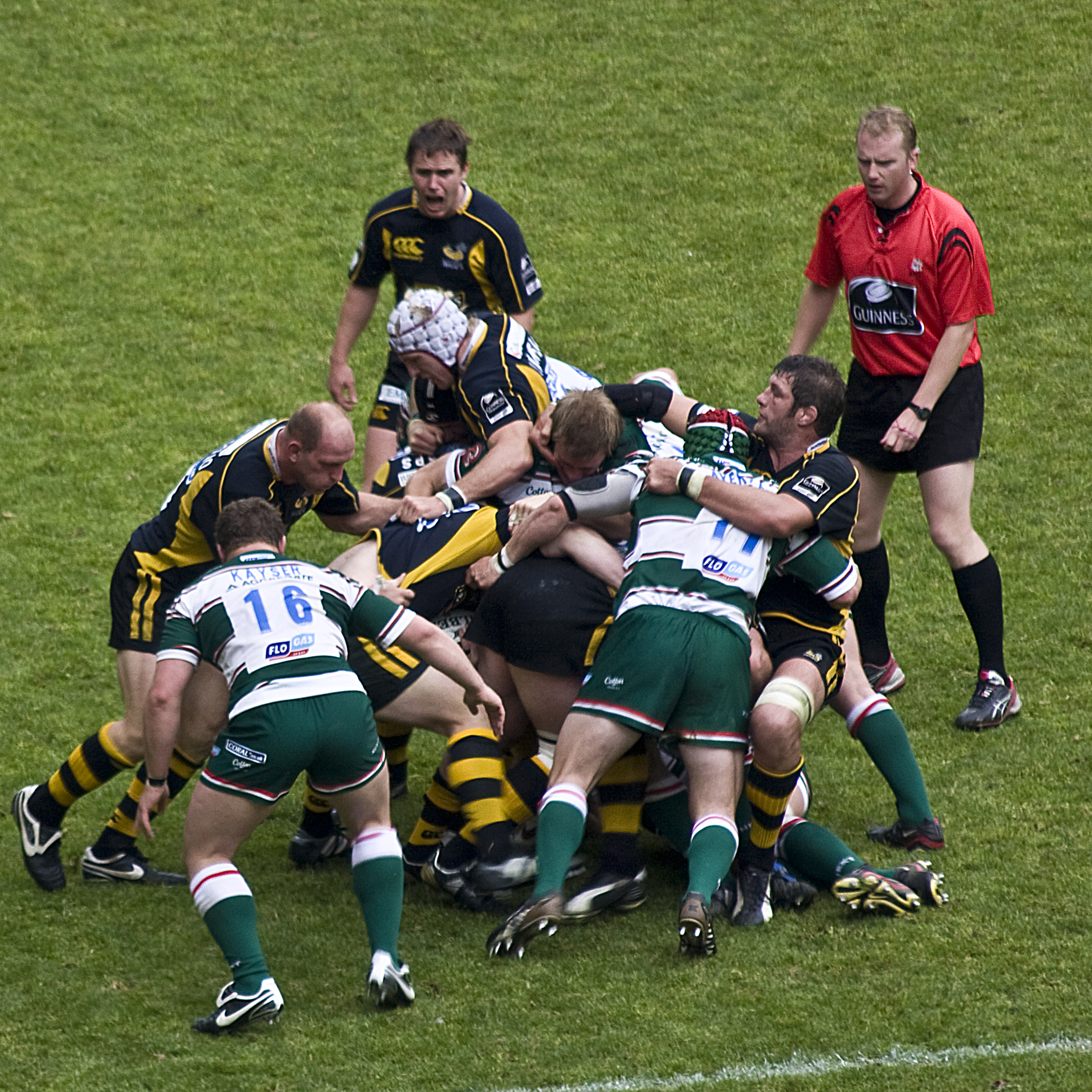
Leicester Tigers playing in the 2008 Premiership Final against Wasps.

Leicester have participated in 16 of the 22 Premiership Play Offs, reaching nine consecutive finals between 2005 and 2013. Leicester finished first in 2004–05 going directly to the final; in Martin Johnson & Neil Back's last game for the club, they lost 39–14 to Wasps. The following season, Tigers finished second beating London Irish 40–8 in their first Play Off semi final before losing the final 45–20 to Sale.

In 2007, Leicester won their first title via the playoffs. They defeated Bristol 26–14 in the semi-final before beating Gloucester 44–16 at Twickenham. On 18 May 2008, Leicester defeated Gloucester at Kingsholm to become the first team to win a Premiership semi-final playoff away from home. Leicester lost the 2008 final 26–16 to Wasps.

In 2008–09, Tigers topped the table and beat Bath 24–10 in the semi-final. The final was the closest yet, Tigers winning 10–9 against London Irish. In 2010, the side retained the trophy winning 33–27 against Saracens, Dan Hipkiss scored the decisive try in the closing stages. Tigers reached the 2010–11 final for a rematch with Saracens losing 22–18.

2011–12 saw Tigers finish second in the table and beat Saracens 24–15 in the semi-finals at Welford Road. In the 2012 final, Harlequins beat Leicester 30–23. In 2013, Leicester finished second and beat Harlequins 33–16 in the semi-final at Welford Road. Leicester won their tenth Premiership title by beating Northampton, 37–17. These nine consecutive finals is a record for consecutive appearances in a Premiership play-off final.

In 2014, Leicester finished third and lost, 21–20, to Northampton in the semi-final at Franklin's Gardens. In 2015, Leicester finished third and lost to Bath, 47–10, in the semi-finals. In 2016, Leicester finished fourth and travelled to Allianz Park where they lost to Saracens, 44–17. In 2017, Leicester finished fourth and faced Wasps at the Ricoh Arena, losing 21–20.

After a four-year spell of missing the play offs, Leicester returned to the play offs in 2022 after finishing the regular season top. In the semi-final, they beat Northampton Saints 27–14. In the final, they faced Saracens, Freddie Burns scored an 80th minute drop goal to win the final 15–12 and seal Leicester's 11th English Championship.

In the 2023 season, Leicester finished third and lost to Sale Sharks, 21–13, after travelling to the AJ Bell Stadium in Salford. Tigers faced Sale again in 2025 semi-finals, this time at Welford Road. Tigers won 21–16, Izaia Perese scoring the winning try with his first touch breaking from 40 meters out. In the final, they played Bath, losing 23–21 after a string of controversial penalty decisions against Leicester. In 2025–26, Leicester lost on the final day of the season to finish 4th and travelled to Northampton, where they lost 45-31.

== Honours ==
Leicester hold the record for most Premiership titles (11), the most consecutive Premiership Final appearances (9) and the most Play off appearances (14). They were the first team to achieve an away semi-final victory in the Premiership play-offs (against Gloucester at Kingsholm on 18 May 2008).

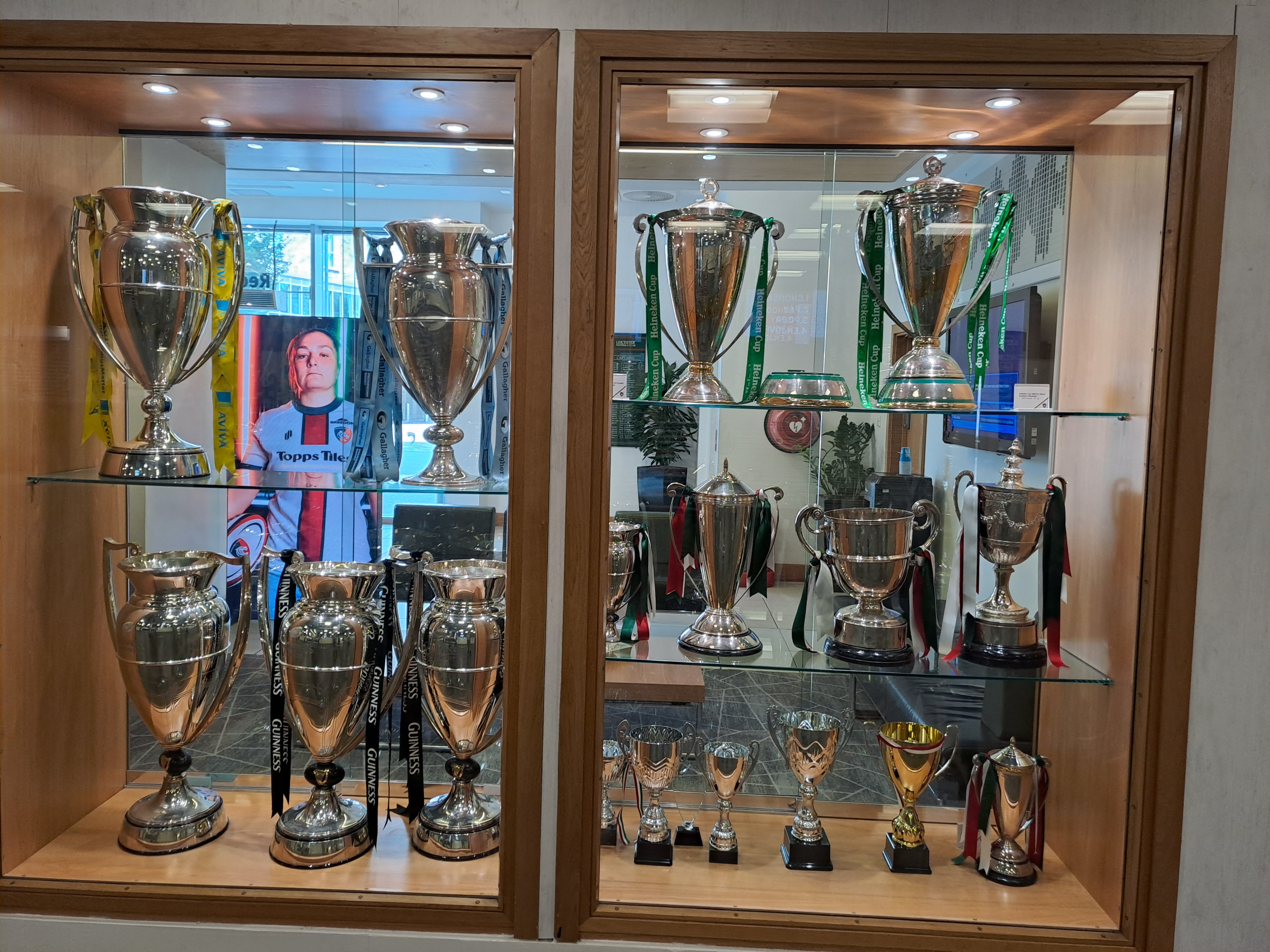
Leicester Tigers trophy cabinet in August 2024

=== 1st XV ===
- Premiership Rugby
  - Champions (11): 1988, 1995, 1999, 2000, 2001, 2002, 2007, 2009, 2010, 2013, 2022
  - Runners-up (8): 1994, 1996, 2005, 2006, 2008, 2011, 2012, 2025
- European Cup
  - Champions (2): 2001, 2002
  - Runners-up (3): 1997, 2007, 2009
- Zurich Championship
  - Champions (1): 2001
- RFU Knockout Cup
  - Champions (5): 1979, 1980, 1981, 1993, 1997
  - Runners-up (5): 1978, 1983, 1989, 1994, 1996
- Anglo-Welsh Cup
  - Champions (3): 2007, 2012, 2017
  - Runners-up (1): 2008
- Premiership Rugby Cup
  - Champions (1): 2026
  - Runners-up (1): 2024
- European Challenge Cup
  - Runners-up (1): 2020–21
- Midland Counties Cup
  - Champions (12): 1897–98, 1898–99, 1899–1900, 1900–01, 1901–02, 1902–03, 1903–04, 1904–05, 1908–09, 1909–10, 1911–12, 1912–13
  - Runners-up (3): 1888–89, 1890–91, 1893–94

=== Leicester A (Reserve team) ===
- Premiership A League

Champions (4) 2005, 2006, 2010, 2011
Runners-up (1) 2007

- Leicestershire County Cup

Champions (5) 1895, 1896, 1898, 1899, 1902

== Club culture ==
=== Nickname ===
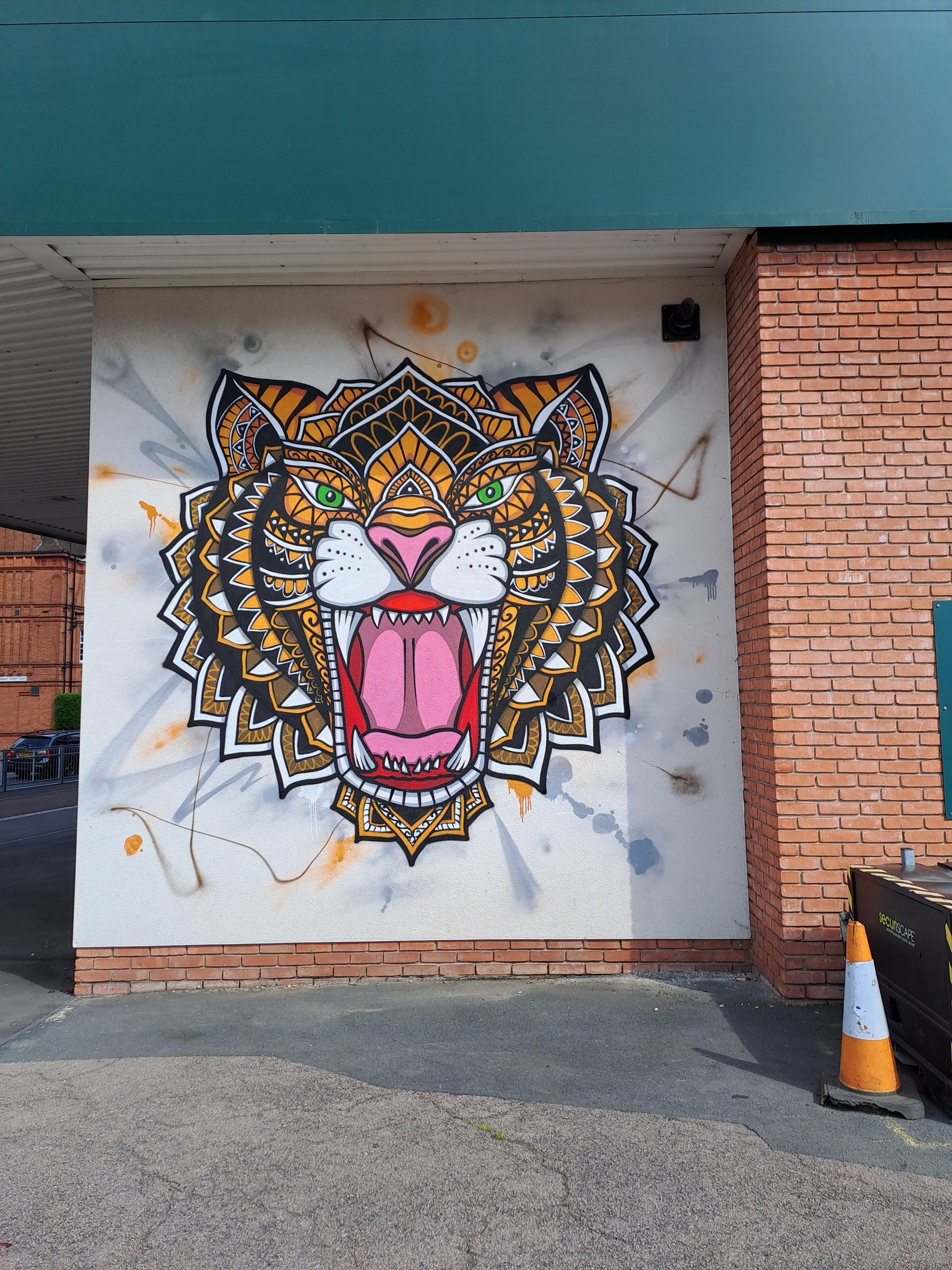
A mural on the West Stand at Welford Road Stadium

The club's formal name is Leicester Football Club but is widely known by the nickname "Tigers". The first known use of the name was after a game against Bedford School in February 1885, the Leicester Daily Post reporting that "the Tiger stripes were keeping well together". The origin of the nickname is uncertain most probably coming from the side's chocolate and yellow playing kit, but it may have come from the club's links to the Leicestershire Regiment, who had received the nickname 'Tigers' after serving in India, and from 1825 had worn a cap-badge with a 'royal' tiger to mark the connection.

In their early years, the side were also known as "The Death or Glory Boys" on account of their black shirts.

=== Player identification ===
In the 1926–27 season, Leicester started using letters to identify their forwards; The Birmingham Post report for the match against Bath on 6 October 1926 noted "Leicester's forwards were picked out easily as their jerseys were decorated with large bold letters A-G". On 12 September 1931, against Old Blues, the practice was expanded to the whole team.

This tradition lasted until 1998 when Premiership Rugby rules forced Leicester to abandon lettering and Tigers first wore numbers on 5 September 1998 against Harlequins at Welford Road.

Since then, Leicester have only returned to letters for non-competition friendlies against sides such as Australia or the New Zealand Maori. On the current kit, the letters are displayed in small on the front of the jersey.

=== Colours ===
Tigers' very first kit was black with white shorts and black socks, with the club's crest in the centre of the chest. From 1884 to 1887, the club played in chocolate and yellow shirts, likely giving rise to the club's nickname, white shorts and black socks before experimenting with claret and French grey horizontal stripes between 1887 and 1891.

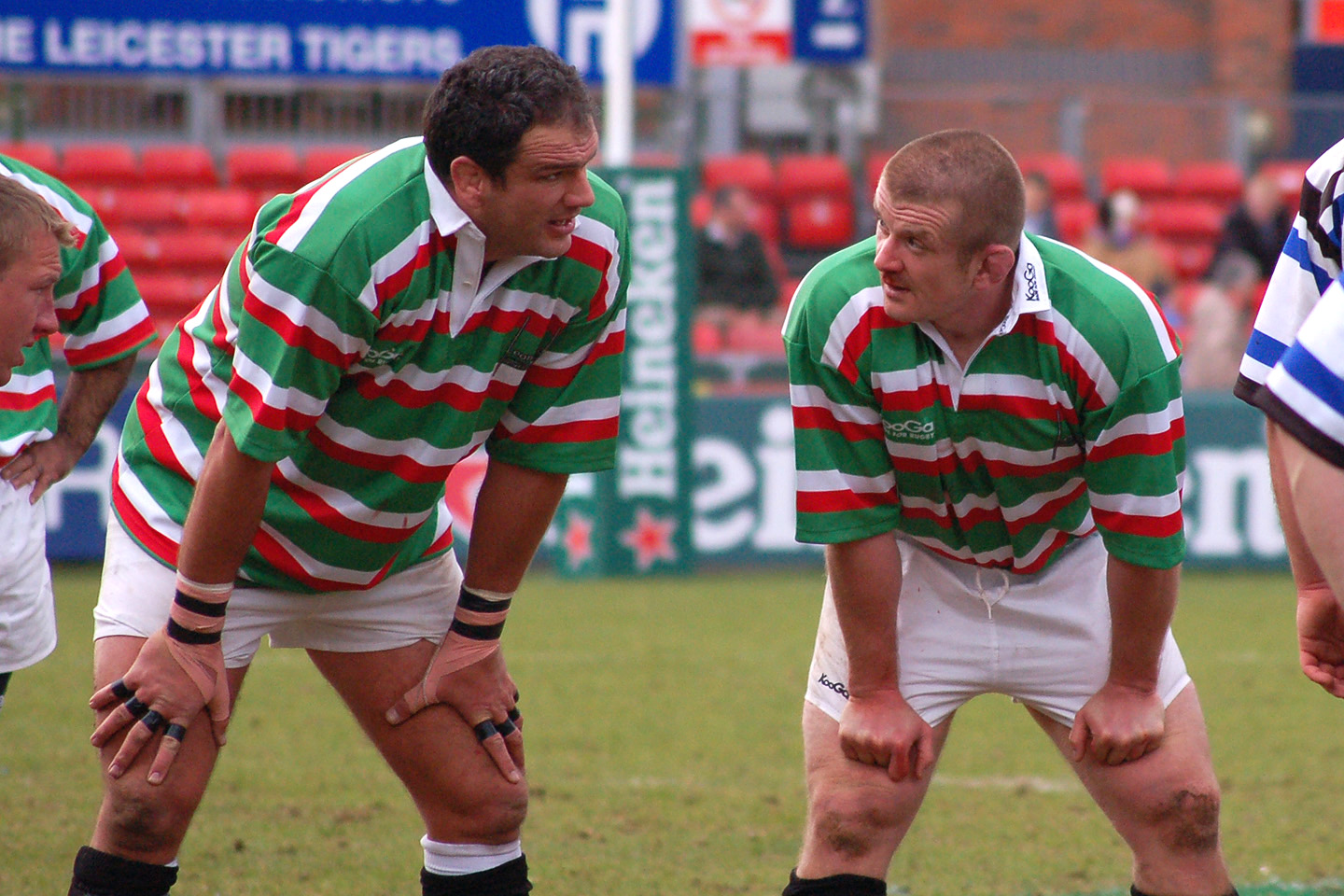
Martin Johnson and Graham Rowntree in Tigers traditional colours during the friendly match vs. Bath in 2007.

The first use of the scarlet, green and white was on 3 October 1891 against Wolverton at Belgrave Cricket & Cycle Ground. However, for the 1891–92 season, the pattern was vertical stripes. It was not until 1895 that the now-traditional scarlet, green and white horizontal stripes were introduced to the jersey, paired with black shorts and socks until 1906. The Tigers then played three seasons between 1906 and 1909 in white shirts with navy shorts, the first two seasons with a leaping tiger logo on the left breast before reverting to a scarlet, green and white striped jersey, while retaining the navy shorts. This new kit layout lasted until 1947 when the navy shorts were swapped for white.

The Tigers kit and colours did not materially change between 1947 and 1999, only slight variations in the sizes of the stripes, the addition of a manufacturer's logo in 1975, a sponsor in 1988 and in 1991 the addition of the club crest for the first time since 1908.

In 1999, the Tigers switched to a darker green and have played in a variety of kit designs since.

1880–1884	1884–1887	1887–1891	1891–1895

1895–1906	1906–1909	1906–1947	1947–1999

=== Summary of kit manufacturers and sponsors ===
Seasons	Manufacturer	Sponsor
1991–1992	Cotton; Oxford	None
1992–1993	Cotton; Oxford	Ansells
1993–1995	Cotton; Oxford	Tetley Bitter
1995–1996	Cotton; Oxford	GoldStar
1996–1997	Cotton; Traders	GoldStar
1997–1999	Cotton; Traders	Next
1999–2002	Cotton; Traders	Vauxhall
2002–2008	Cotton; Traders	Bradstone
2008–2012	Cotton; Traders	Caterpillar
2012–2015	Canterbury	Caterpillar
2015–2016	KooGa	Caterpillar
2016–2017	KooGa	Holland and Barrett
2017–2020	Kukri Sports	Holland and Barrett
2020–2025	Samurai	Topps Tiles
2025–2026	Castore	Mattioli Woods
2026-2027	Castore	

=== Rivalries ===
Tigers' main rivals are Northampton Saints - the East Midlands Derby has taken place between the two clubs for over 130 years - and Bath, a rivalry that developed in the 1980s and 1990s, when both sides were fighting at the top of the English game.

Tigers also developed a rivalry with Wasps in the mid-2000s, when they faced each other in three major finals over the course of four seasons, with Wasps winning all three. Historically, Tigers had a strong local rivalry with Coventry from the 1880s until the 1990s, after which the sides did not face each other until 2025.

Twice annually, Tigers face Gloucester for the Slater Cup, named in honour of Ed Slater a former player for both sides who was diagnosed in 2022 with motor neurone disease. Prior to the cup being awarded, Leicester and Gloucester had faced each other over 200 times since the 1890s.

== Stadium ==
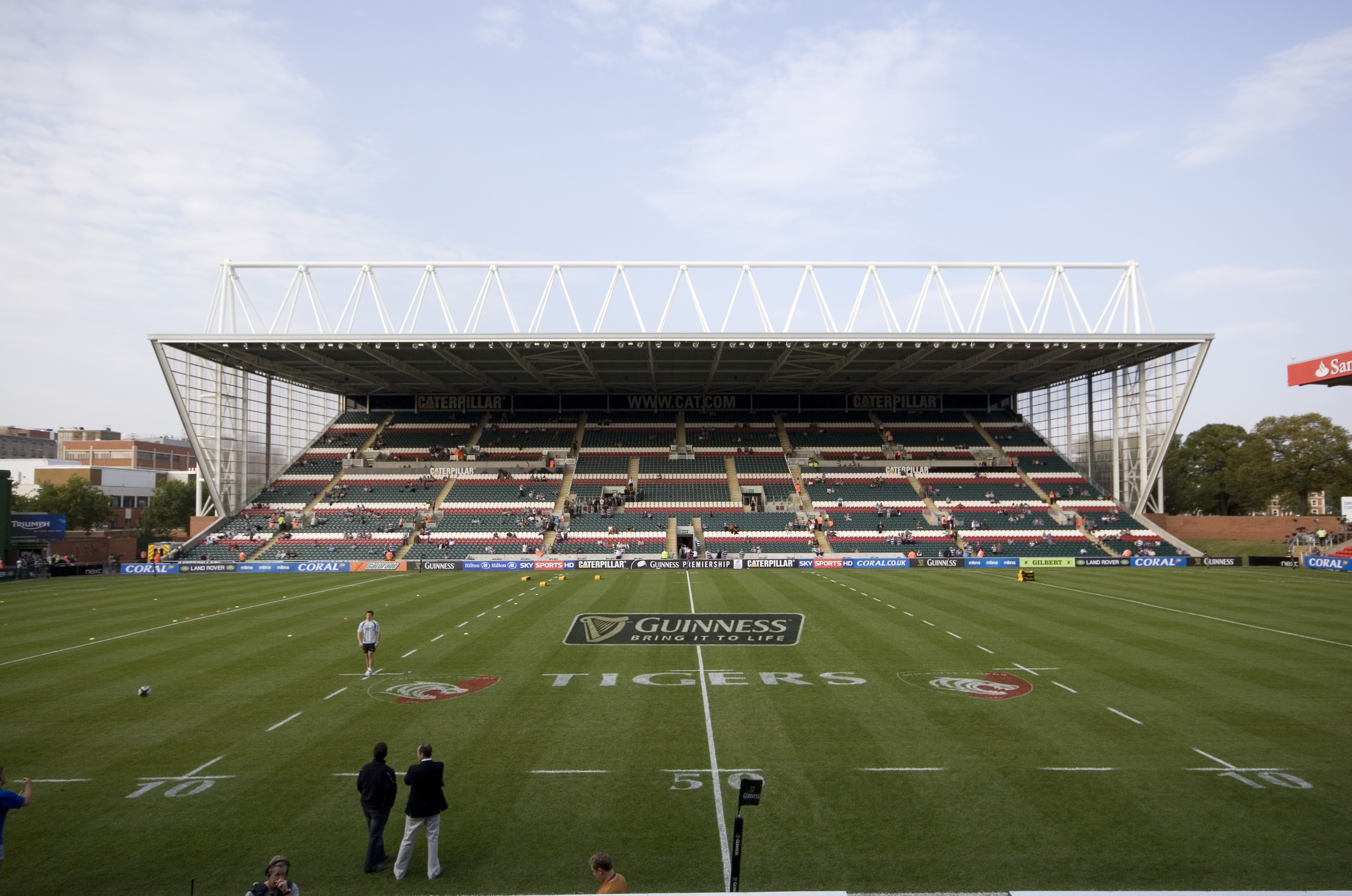
The North stand

The club plays its home games at Mattioli Wood Welford Road. The ground was opened in 1892 and the first stands accommodated 3,000 spectators. The clubhouse was built on the Aylestone Road end in 1909, the Members' & Crumbie Stands were built just before and just after the First World War respectively. A stand was built at the Welford Road end in 1995, initially called the Alliance & Leicester Stand, it is currently known as the Mattioli Woods Stand. The total ground capacity is currently 25,849 after redevelopments in 2008 and 2015.

Before redevelopment of Welford Road began in 2008 the club explored other options. On 23 November 2004 the club announced that it had entered into a 50–50 joint venture with the city's main football club, Leicester City, to purchase City's current ground, Leicester City Stadium. If the purchase had gone through, the Tigers would have surrendered their lease on Welford Road and moved into Walkers Stadium. However, after several months of talks, the two clubs ended any ground share plans in July 2005.

On 11 June 2007 the club announced plans that it was working for a redevelopment plan which would raise the capacity from 17,498 to 25,000 by 2011. On 20 February 2008 Leicester Tigers received planning consent for the £60million redevelopment of Welford Road. The first phase of the development was a new 10,000 seat North Stand (Granby Halls side), taking overall capacity from 17,498 to 24,000. In the summer of 2008 work began on the construction of the new North Stand. The work was completed for the first home game of the 2009-10 season against Newcastle Falcons.

At the end of the 2008–09 season three home games were played at the King Power Stadium, then known as the Walkers Stadium, due to demolition of the old north stand. These saw Tigers play Bath twice, a 20–15 win in the Heineken Cup quarter finals and a victory in the Premiership Play Off semi finals as well as a 73–3 win against Bristol. Tigers have also played two Heineken Cup semi-final games at the King Power Stadium, against Toulose and Llanelli Scarlets in 2005 and 2007 respectively, but the ground was designated as a neutral venue for both.

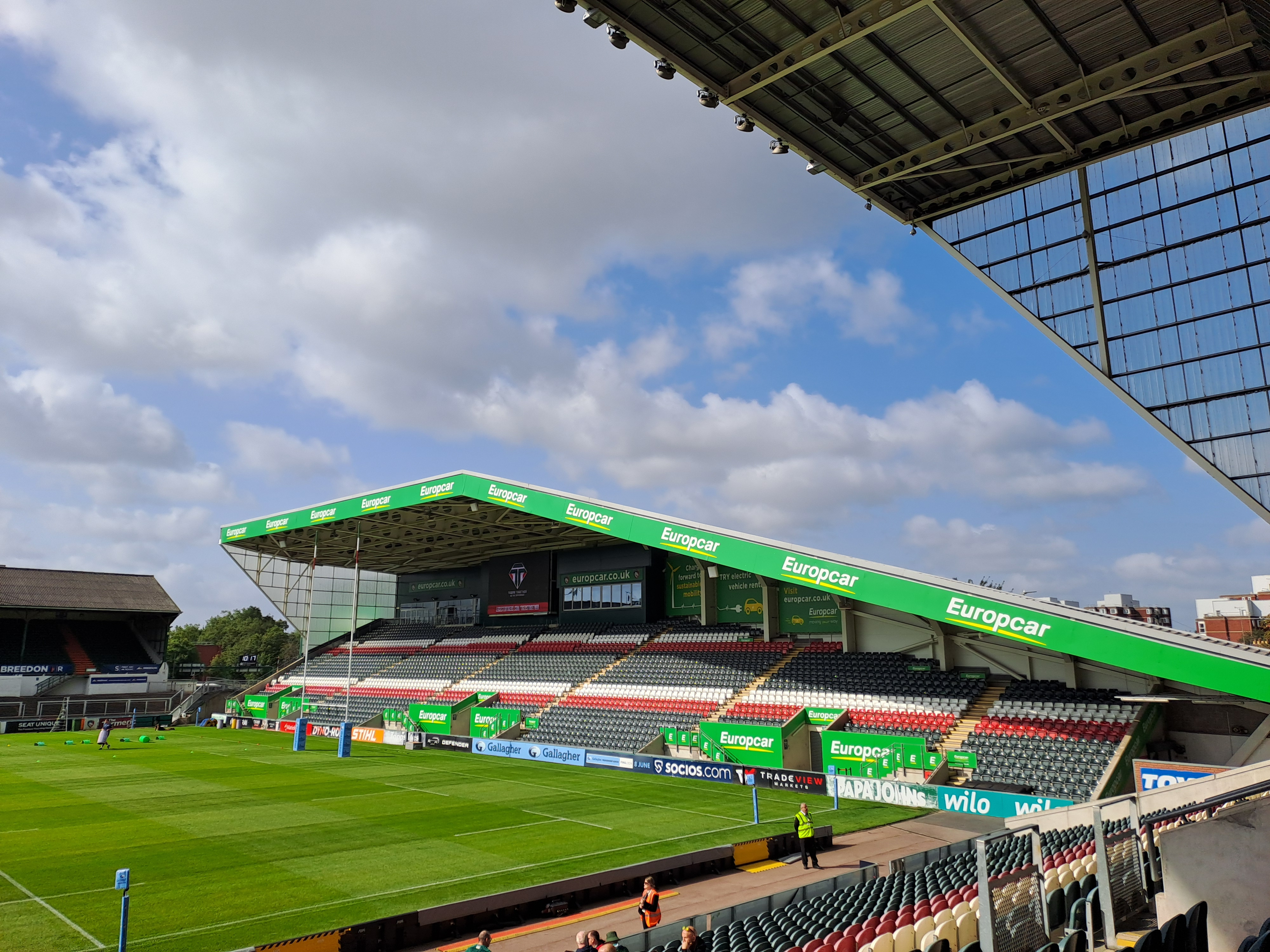
Welford Road's West stand taken at open training session in August 2024

On 27 February 2015 Tigers announced plans to continue the redevelopment of Welford Road by replacing the clubhouse and temporary West Stand with a new permanent building with a 3,100 capacity. Work started on 28 May 2015 and was completed by January 2016.

In October 2020, Mattioli Woods extended their naming rights deal to include the entire stadium for 5 seasons until 2024–25. The stadium became Mattioli Woods Welford Road.

== Current squad ==
=== Senior squad ===
The Leicester Tigers senior squad for the 2026–27 season is:

Leicester Tigers 2026–27 Premiership Rugby squad
**Props**: (England) Archie van der Flier; (England) Tarek Haffar; (England) **Joe Heyes** (Note: Joe Heyes is jointly contracted with the RFU, via an enhanced England Elite Player Squad (EPS) contract.); (Scotland) **Will Hurd**; (Sweden) **Ale Loman**; (Argentina) **Joel Sclavi**; (England) **Mako Vunipola**; **Hookers**: (Samoa) **Richie Asiata**; (England) **Jamie Blamire**; (England) Charlie Clare; (England) Jack Doorey-Palmer; (Tonga) **Sam Moli**; **Locks**: (England) Lewis Chessum; (England) **Ollie Chessum** **(c)** (Note: Ollie Chessum is jointly contracted with the RFU, via an enhanced England Elite Player Squad (EPS) contract.); (Scotland) **Cameron Henderson**; (England) Elliott Stooke; (New Zealand) James Thompson	**Back row**: (England) Finn Carnduff; (Wales) **Olly Cracknell**; (England) Emeka Ilione; (England) Joshua Manz; (Argentina) **Joaquín Moro**; (Wales) **Tommy Reffell**; (Wales) **Aaron Wainwright**; **Scrum-halves**: (England) Ollie Allan; (England) **Jack van Poortvliet** (Note: Jack van Poortvliet is jointly contracted with the RFU, via an enhanced England Elite Player Squad (EPS) contract.); (England) Tom Whiteley; **Fly-halves**: (England) Billy Searle; (England) Charlie Titcombe	**Centres**: (England) Orlando Bailey; (England) Joe Jenkins; (Tonga) **Solomone Kata**; (England) Will Wand; (England) Joseph Woodward; **Wings**: (Wales) Ryan Crowley; (Wales) **Gabriel Hamer-Webb**; (England) **Ollie Hassell-Collins**; (England) **Adam Radwan**; **Fullbacks**: (England) **Freddie Steward**
**(c)** denotes the team captain. **Bold** denotes internationally capped players. Source:

=== Senior Academy squad ===
Leicester Tigers' Academy squad is:

Leicester Tigers 2025–26 Senior Academy squad
**Props**: (England) Kajetan Lewandowski; (England) Seva Batikora; (England) Diamond Ayiehfor; **Locks**: (England) Kwame Bekoe; (England) Fin Charles; (England) Harry Palmer; **Back row**: (England) Henry Johnson; (England) George Marsh; (England) Samuel Williams	**Scrum-halves**: (England) Charlie Bemand; (England) James Townsend; **Fly-halves**: (England) Oscar Talbot; **Centres**: (England) Wilf McCarthy; (England) Charlie Myall; (England) Ollie Myall; **Wings**: (England) Kesena Izu; **Fullbacks**: (England) George Pearson
Italics denotes U20 international. Source:

== Notable former players ==
=== Record appearances and scorers ===
David Matthews holds the record for most appearances for Leicester Tigers with 502 appearances between 1955 and 1974. Percy Lawrie is the only man to score more than 200 tries for the club, scoring a record 206 between 1907 and 1927. Dusty Hare is the club's all-time highest points scorer with 4,507 between 1976 and 1989.

=== Internationals ===
184 players from 16 different nations have been selected to represent their national side whilst a member of Leicester. The first was Jack Miles who was selected for England in 1903, Leicester's first non-English international was Scotland's Jock Lawrie in 1924. The club's first non-British or Irish player selected for international duty was Canada's Dave Lougheed when he played against United States in August 1998.

Two players were retrospectively awarded England caps for matches played whilst at Leicester, John Wells for a match against Italy in 1990 and Stuart Redfern for a match against a Rest-of-the-World XV in 1984.

=== Lions tourists ===
The following are players who have represented the Lions while playing for Leicester:

3 tours:

- Martin Johnson (1993, 1997, 2001)
- Neil Back (1997, 2001, 2005)

2 tours:

- Dan Cole (2013, 2017)
- Tom Croft (2009, 2013)
- Martin Corry (2001, 2005)
- Graham Rowntree (1997, 2005)
- Austin Healey (1997, 2001)
- Dean Richards (1989, 1993)
- Rory Underwood (1989, 1993)
- Clive Woodward (1980, 1983)
- Peter Wheeler (1977, 1980)

1 tour

Italics denote a player who appeared on another tour whilst a member of another club.

2025: Ollie Chessum
2013: Ben Youngs†, Tom Youngs, Manu Tuilagi, Geoff Parling
2009: Harry Ellis
2005: Julian White, Ben Kay, Lewis Moody, Geordan Murphy, Ollie Smith
2001: Dorian West
1997: Will Greenwood, Eric Miller
1993: Tony Underwood
1983: Dusty Hare
1980: Paul Dodge
1974: Alan Old
1971: Rodger Arneil
1959: Tony O'Reilly, Phil Horrocks-Taylor
1936: Bernard Gadney, Alexander Obolensky, Charles Beamish
1930: Doug Prentice, George Beamish, Joe Kendrew
1910: Ken Wood
1908: F. S. Jackson, John Jackett, Tom Smith
1903: Alfred Hind

†Ben Youngs was selected to tour for a second time in 2017, but turned down the offer for family reasons.

=== Rugby World Cup ===
The following are players which have represented their countries at the Rugby World Cup, whilst playing for Leicester:

Tournament	Players selected	England players	Other national team players
1987	2	Dean Richards, Rory Underwood	
1991	2	Dean Richards, Rory Underwood	
1995	6	Neil Back, Martin Johnson, Dean Richards, Graham Rowntree, Rory Underwood, Tony Underwood	
1999	11	Neil Back, Richard Cockerill, Martin Corry, Darren Garforth, Will Greenwood, Austin Healey, Martin Johnson, Leon Lloyd, Graham Rowntree,	Dave Lougheed (Canada) , Fritz van Heerden (South Africa)
2003	8	Neil Back, Martin Corry, Martin Johnson, Ben Kay, Lewis Moody, Julian White, Dorian West,	Dan Lyle (United States)
2007	11	George Chuter, Martin Corry, Dan Hipkiss, Ben Kay, Lewis Moody,	Marcos Ayerza (Argentina) , Seru Rabeni (Fiji) , Geordan Murphy (Ireland) , Martin Castrogiovanni (Italy) , Alesana Tuilagi (Samoa) , Jim Hamilton (Scotland)
2011	12	Dan Cole, Tom Croft, Louis Deacon, Toby Flood, Manu Tuilagi, Thomas Waldrom, Ben Youngs,	Marcos Ayerza (Argentina) , Horacio Agulla (Argentina) , Geordan Murphy (Ireland) , Martin Castrogiovanni (Italy) , Alesana Tuilagi (Samoa)
2015	8	Dan Cole, Ben Youngs, Tom Youngs,	Marcos Ayerza (Argentina) , Vereniki Goneva (Fiji) , Leonardo Ghiraldini (Italy) , Michele Rizzo (Italy) , Opeti Fonua (Tonga)
2019	8	Dan Cole, George Ford, Ellis Genge, Jonny May, Manu Tuilagi, Ben Youngs	Sione Kalamafoni (Tonga) , Telusa Veainu (Tonga)
2023	10	Ollie Chessum, Dan Cole, George Martin, Freddie Steward, Ben Youngs	Julián Montoya (Argentina) , Jasper Wiese (South Africa) Tommy Reffell (Wales) , Solomone Kata (Tonga) , Handré Pollard (South Africa)

=== International captains ===
- Wavell Wakefield (England, 1924, 4 tests)
- Doug Prentice (Lions, 1930, 2 tests)
- George Beamish (Ireland, 1932, 4 tests)
- Bernard Gadney (England, 1934–1936, 8 tests; Lions, 1936, 1 test)
- Douglas Kendrew (England, 1935, 2 tests)
- Peter Wheeler (England, 1983–1984, 5 tests)
- Paul Dodge (England, 1985, 7 tests)
- Martin Johnson (England, 1998–2003, 39 tests; Lions, 1997 & 2001, 6 tests)
- Neil Back (England, 2001, 4 tests)
- Dorian West (England, 2003, 1 test)
- Martin Corry (England, 2005–2007, 17 tests)
- Lewis Moody (England, 2010, 3 tests)
- Martin Castrogiovanni (Italy, 2012, 3 tests)
- Leonardo Ghiraldini (Italy, 2015, 4 tests)
- George Ford (England, 2017–2019, 1 test as co-captain, 4 tests as captain)
- Julián Montoya (Argentina, 2021–2022, 10 tests)

* Martin Corry was also captain for the majority of a Lions test in 2005 after Brian O'Driscoll left the field injured, however he is not considered the official captain for that match.

=== Captains ===
The following have been appointed club captain:

- B. V. D. Zweth
- A. E. Brice
- A. T. Porter
- L. Young
- J. G. S. Coleman
- W. A. Sheffield
- J. Parsons
- R. S. Snowden
- W. R. Porter
- A. McKechnie
- W. H. Sturges
- A. E. Cooke
- E. Redman
- A. O. Jones
- W. J. Foreman
- J. W. Garner
- S. Matthews
- R. F. Russell
- J. R. Watson
- P. W. Lawrie
- W. J. Allen
- W. W. Wakefield
- H. L. V. Day
- F. D. Prentice
- H. D. Greenless
- D. J. Norman
- R. A. Buckingham
- B. C. Gadney
- R. J. Barr
- J. T. W. Berry
- H. P. Jerwood
- A. C. Towell
- D. Goves
- W. K. T. Moore
- A. D. Bolesworth
- J. M. Jenkins
- J. Elders
- T. Bleasdale
- J. S. Swan
- C. G. Martin
- M. R. Wade
- M. J. Harrison
- D. J. Matthews
- G. G. Willars
- K. P. Andrews
- J. Allen
- R. V. Grove
- P. J. Wheeler
- R. S. Money
- R. E. Rowell
- B. P. Hall
- S. Johnson
- I. R. Smith
- L. Cusworth
- P. W. Dodge
- J. M. Wells
- D. Richards
- M. O. Johnson
- N. A. Back
- J. A. Kronfeld
- M. E. Corry
- G. E. A. Murphy
- T. G. A. L. Flood
- E. N. Slater
- T. N. Youngs
- E. Genge
- H. Liebenberg
- J. Montoya
- O. A. Chessum

=== World Rugby Hall of Fame ===
The following people associated with club have been inducted into the World Rugby Hall of Fame.

- Tony O'Reilly – Inducted in 2009
- Martin Johnson – Inducted in 2011
- Clive Woodward – Inducted in 2011
- Bob Dwyer – Inducted in 2011
- Waisale Serevi – Inducted in 2013
- Wavell Wakefield – Inducted in 2015
- Joel Stransky – Inducted in 2026

=== Team of the Century and Walk of Legends ===
Tigers have named two "best" teams in recent times. On 1 November 2000 to celebrate the coming millennium a panel of former Tigers players and administrators named a Team of the century; whilst from October 2008 to February 2009 to celebrate the building of the then named Caterpillar Stand fans were invited to vote on a Walk of Legends in partnership with the Leicester Mercury.

Team of the century
Position	Nationality	Player	Tigers career
Full back	(Scotland)	Ken Scotland	40 games 1961–1962
Right wing	(England)	Alastair Smallwood	64 games 1920–1925
Right centre	(England)	Clive Woodward	148 games 1979–1985
Left centre	(England)	Paul Dodge	434 games 1975–1993
Left wing	(England)	Rory Underwood	236 games 1983–1997
Fly half	(England)	Les Cusworth	365 games 1978–1990
Scrum half	(England)	Bernard Gadney	170 games 1929–1939
Loosehad prop	(England)	Bob Stirling	75 games 1948–1953
Hooker	(England)	Peter Wheeler	349 games 1969–1985
Tighthead prop	(England)	Darren Garforth	1991–
Lock	(England)	Martin Johnson (c)	1989–
Lock	(Ireland)	George Beamish	118 games 1924–1933
Blindside flanker	(England)	Doug Prentice	239 games 1923–1931
Opendside flanker	(England)	Neil Back	1990–
No. 8	(England)	Dean Richards	314 games 1982–1997
Coach:	(England)	Chalkie White

Walk of Legends
Position	Nationality	Player	Tigers career
Full back	(England)	Dusty Hare	394 games 1976–1989
Right wing	(Ireland)	John Duggan	302 games 1970–1980
Right centre	(England)	Clive Woodward	148 games 1979–1985
Left centre	(England)	Paul Dodge	434 games 1975–1993
Left wing	(England)	Rory Underwood	236 games 1983–1997
Fly half	(Wales)	Bleddyn Jones	333 games 1969–1978
Scrum half	(England)	Austin Healey	248 games 1996–2006
Loosehad prop	(England)	Graham Rowntree	398 games 1990–2007
Hooker	(England)	Peter Wheeler	349 games 1969–1985
Tighthead prop	(England)	Steve Redfern	241 games 1976–1984
Lock	(England)	Martin Johnson	362 games 1989–2005
Lock	(England)	Matt Poole	223 games 1988–1998
Blindside flanker	(England)	Graham Willars	338 games 1959–1987
Opendside flanker	(England)	David Matthews	502 games 1955–1974
No. 8	(England)	Dean Richards	314 games 1982–1997

At the time the Team of the Century was announced Garforth, Johnson and Back were still current players.

== Coaches ==
=== Current coaches ===
- (England) Geoff Parling, Head Coach
- (Australia) Rod Seib, Attack Coach
- (South Africa) Craig Childs, Defence Coach
- (New Zealand) Craig Newby, Forwards Skills Coach
- (England) Freddie Burns, Technical Kicking and Assistant Skills Coach
- (England) Anthony Allen, Assistant Coach
- (England) Neil Fowkes, Assistant Coach

=== Past coaches ===
As of 7 November 2026

Name	Nat.	From	To	P	W	D	L	Win %	Honours
Bob Dwyer	Australia	July 1996	14 February 1998	70	52	1	17	74.26	1997 Pilkington Cup
Dean Richards	England	22 February 1998	2 February 2004	210	138	6	66	65.71	1998–99 Premiership, 1999–00 Premiership, 2000–01 Premiership, 2000–01 Zurich Championship, 2000–01 Heineken Cup, 2001–02 Premiership, 2001–02 Heineken Cup
John Wells	England	3 February 2004	14 May 2005	45	31	5	9	68.88	
Pat Howard	Australia	July 2005	20 May 2007	75	49	4	22	65.33	2006–07 Premiership, 2006–07 Anglo Welsh Cup
Richard Cockerill (Caretaker)	England	July 2007	3 November 2007	8	5	0	3	62.50	
Marcelo Loffreda	Argentina	10 November 2007	31 May 2008	28	15	0	13	53.57	
Heyneke Meyer	South Africa	July 2008	24 January 2009	21	13	1	7	61.90	
Richard Cockerill	England	15 February 2009	2 January 2017	276	178	11	87	64.49	2008–09 Premiership, 2009–10 Premiership, 2011-12 Anglo-Welsh Cup, 2012–13 Premiership
Aaron Mauger (Caretaker)	New Zealand	2 January 2017	25 March 2017	12	7	0	5	58.33	2016-17 Anglo-Welsh Cup
Matt O'Connor	Australia	26 March 2017	3 September 2018	38	19	0	19	50.00	
Geordan Murphy	Ireland	3 September 2018	13 November 2020	64	21	1	42	32.81	
Steve Borthwick	England	13 November 2020	19 December 2022	78	53	1	24	67.94	2021–22 Premiership
Richard Wigglesworth (Caretaker)	England	19 December 2022	14 May 2023	16	9	0	7	56.25	
Dan McKellar	Australia	1 July 2023	22 June 2024	30	16	0	14	53.33	
Michael Cheika	Australia	27 June 2024	15 June 2025	31	18	1	12	58.06	
Geoff Parling	England	16 June 2025		43	26	0	17	60.46	2025–26 Prem Rugby Cup

== Sources ==
- Farmer, Stuart; Hands, David (2014). Tigers - Official history of Leicester Football Club. The Rugby Development Foundation. ISBN 978-0-9930213-0-5.
