= Leicester Tigers in cup finals =

Leicester Tigers' results in various rugby union cup finals

This article is about the results and history of Leicester Tigers in cup finals. Leicester Tigers are a prominent rugby union club in England and compete in major national and continental finals. Leicester have competed in 49 major finals winning 29 and losing 20.

== Summary ==
Competition	Date	Opponent	Result	For	Against	Venue	Attendance	Ref
Midlands Counties Cup	23 March 1889	Moseley	L	0	6	The Butts, Coventry	4,000	
Midlands Counties Cup	4 April 1891	Coventry	L	0	8	Rugby Cricket Club		
Midlands Counties Cup	31 March 1894	Coventry	L	0	11	Rugby Cricket Club		
Midlands Counties Cup	6 April 1898	Moseley	W	5	3	The Butts, Coventry		
Midlands Counties Cup	1 April 1899	Nuneaton	W	20	3	The Butts, Coventry	8,000	
Midlands Counties Cup	31 March 1900	Moseley	W	13	4	The Butts, Coventry	10,000	
Midlands Counties Cup	30 March 1901	Moseley	W	8	3	Rugby Cricket Club		
Midlands Counties Cup	29 March 1902	Moseley	W	5	0	The Butts, Coventry	8,000	
Midlands Counties Cup	4 April 1903	Rugby	W	18	0	The Butts, Coventry	6,000	
Midlands Counties Cup	2 April 1904	Moseley	W	13	3	Burton-on-Trent	5,000	
Midlands Counties Cup	1 April 1905	Nottingham	W	31	0	The Butts, Coventry	10,000	
Midlands Counties Cup	3 April 1909	Coventry	W	8	3	Nottingham	4,000	
Midlands Counties Cup	2 April 1910	Coventry	W	8	6	Nuneaton	10,000	
Midlands Counties Cup	30 March 1912	Coventry	W	16	0	Rugby Cricket Club	3,000	
Midlands Counties Cup	5 April 1913	Belgrave Premier Works	W	39	8	Welford Road, Leicester	2,853	
RFU Knock-out Cup	15 April 1978	Gloucester	L	3	6	Twickenham, London	24,000	
RFU Knock-out Cup	21 April 1979	Moseley	W	15	12	Twickenham, London	18,000	
RFU Knock-out Cup	19 April 1980	London Irish	W	21	9	Twickenham, London	27,000	
RFU Knock-out Cup	2 May 1981	Gosforth	W	22	15	Twickenham, London	24,000	
RFU Knock-out Cup	30 April 1983	Bristol	L	22	28	Twickenham, London	34,000	
RFU Knock-out Cup	29 April 1989	Bath	L	6	10	Twickenham, London	59,300	
RFU Knock-out Cup	1 May 1993	Harlequins	W	23	16	Twickenham, London	54,000	
RFU Knock-out Cup	7 May 1994	Bath	L	9	21	Twickenham, London	68,000	
RFU Knock-out Cup	4 May 1996	Bath	L	15	16	Twickenham, London	75,000	
Heineken Cup	25 January 1997	Brive	L	9	28	Cardiff Arms Park, Cardiff	41,664	
RFU Knock-out Cup	10 May 1997	Sale	W	9	3	Twickenham, London	75,000	
Zurich Championship	13 May 2001	Bath	W	22	10	Twickenham, London	33,500	
Heineken Cup	19 May 2001	Stade Français	W	34	30	Parc des Princes, Paris	44,000	
Heineken Cup	25 May 2002	Munster	W	15	9	Millennium Stadium, Cardiff	74,600	
Premiership	14 May 2005	London Wasps	L	14	39	Twickenham, London	60,762	
Premiership	27 May 2006	Sale Sharks	L	20	45	Twickenham, London	58,000	
Anglo-Welsh Cup	15 April 2007	Ospreys	W	41	35	Twickenham, London	43,312	
Premiership	12 May 2007	Gloucester	W	44	16	Twickenham, London	59,400	
Heineken Cup	20 May 2007	London Wasps	L	9	25	Twickenham, London	81,076	
Anglo-Welsh Cup	12 April 2008	Ospreys	L	6	23	Twickenham, London	65,756	
Premiership	31 May 2008	London Wasps	L	16	26	Twickenham, London	81,600	
Premiership	16 May 2009	London Irish	W	10	9	Twickenham, London	81,601	
Heineken Cup	23 May 2009	Leinster	L	16	19	Murrayfield, Edinburgh	66,523	
Premiership	29 May 2010	Saracens	W	33	27	Twickenham, London	81,600	
Premiership	28 May 2011	Saracens	L	18	22	Twickenham, London	80,016	
Anglo-Welsh Cup	18 March 2012	Northampton	W	26	14	Sixways, Worcester	11,895	
Premiership	26 May 2012	Harlequins	L	23	30	Twickenham, London	81,779	
Premiership	25 May 2013	Northampton	W	37	17	Twickenham, London	81,703	
Anglo-Welsh Cup	19 March 2017	Exeter Chiefs	W	16	12	Twickenham Stoop, London	6,834	
European Challenge Cup	21 May 2021	Montpellier	L	17	18	Twickenham, London	10,000	
Premiership	18 June 2022	Saracens	W	15	12	Twickenham, London	72,784	
Premiership Cup	15 March 2024	Gloucester	L	13	23	Kingsholm, Gloucester	14,460	
Premiership	14 June 2025	Bath	L	21	23	Twickenham, London	81,708	
Prem Rugby Cup	15 March 2026	Exeter Chiefs	W	66	14	Welford Road, Leicester		

== Midland Counties Cup ==
Win Loss

23 March 1889	Moseley	6–0	Leicester	The Butts, Coventry
				Attendance: 4,000

4 April 1891	Coventry	8–0	Leicester	Rugby Cricket Club

31 March 1894	Coventry	11–0	Leicester	Rugby Cricket Club

6 April 1898	Leicester	5–3	Moseley	The Butts, Coventry
	Try: P.Oscroft; Con: F.Jones

1 April 1899	Leicester	20–3	Nuneaton	The Butts, Coventry
	Try: F.Jones (3); H.Wilkinson (2); Woodyatt; Con: F.Jones			Attendance: 8,000

31 March 1900	Leicester	13–4	Moseley	The Butts, Coventry
	Try: F.Jones (2); Foreman; Con: A.O.Jones; F.Jones			Attendance: 10,000

30 March 1901	Leicester	8–3	Moseley	Rugby Cricket Club
	Try: Foreman; H.Wilkinson; Con: A.O.Jones

29 March 1902	Leicester	5–0	Moseley	The Butts, Coventry
	Try: A.Hind; Con: Butlin			Attendance: 8,000

4 April 1903	Leicester	18–0	Rugby	The Butts, Coventry
	Try: A.Hind (2); Miles; Dakin; Con: A.O.Jones (3)			Attendance: 6,000

2 April 1904	Leicester	13–3	Moseley	Burton on Trent
	Try: Russell; D.Atkins; Sutton; Con: A.O.Jones (2)			Attendance: 5,000

1 April 1905	Leicester	31–0	Nottingham	The Butts, Coventry
	Try: A. Hind (3); Parsons (3); Hills; Con: J. Jackett; A. O. Jones; Matthews; Drop: Braithwaite			Attendance: 10,000

3 April 1909	Leicester	8–3	Coventry	Nottingham
	Try: P.Lawrie (2); Con: Grimson			Attendance: 4,000

2 April 1910	Leicester	8–6	Coventry	Nuneaton
	Try: P.Wood; Con: J. Jackett; Mark: J. Jackett			Attendance: 10,000

30 March 1912	Leicester	16–0	Coventry	Rugby Cricket Club
	Try: P.Lawrie; Hogarth; Greasley; Con: Bream (2); Pen: Bream			Attendance: 3,000

5 April 1913	Leicester	39–8	Belgrave Premier Works	Welford Road, Leicester
	Try: Dalby (3); Hunter (2); P.Lawrie (2); Farmer (2); Greasley; T.Taylor; Con: Hunter; P.Lawrie; Bream			Attendance: 2,853

== RFU Knock-out Cup ==
Launched in 1971 the Cup was the first nationwide competition for rugby union clubs in England. It was a straight knock-out cup format, teams were not seeded however with the introduction of leagues the top division side such as Leicester joined the competition in later rounds, and ran until 2005 when it was replaced by the Anglo-Welsh Cup. Tigers played in 10 finals, winning 5.

Win Loss

15 April 1978	Gloucester	6–3	Leicester	Twickenham, London
	Try: Mogg; Con: Butler		Pen: Hare	Attendance: 24,000; Referee: Roger Quittenton (London)

Team details

15	Peter Butler
14	Bob Clewes
13	Brian Vine
12	Richard Jardine
11	Richard Mogg
10	Christopher Williams
9	Paul Howell
8	Vivian Woodley
7	John Simonett
6	John Watkins (c)
5	John Fidler
4	Stephen Boyle
3	Mike Burton
2	Stephen Mills
1	Gordon Sargent
Replacements:
16	Ron Etheridge
17	Dave Pointon
18	Peter Kingston
19	Mike Curran
20	Fred Reed
21	Eddie Pinkney
Coach:

O	Dusty Hare
N	John Duggan
M	Paul Dodge
L	Brian Hall (c)
K	Bob Barker
J	Bleddyn Jones
I	Steve Kenney
G	Dave Forfar
H	Garry Adey
F	Steve Johnson
E	Arthur Hazelrigg
D	Nick Joyce
C	Steve Redfern
B	Peter Wheeler
A	Ray Needham
Replacements:
P	Robin Money
Q	Bill Reichwald
R	T Walley
S	Angus Collington
T	John White
U	Dosser Smith
Coach:
Chalkie White

21 April 1979	Leicester	15–12	Moseley	Twickenham, London
	Try: Kenney; Con: Hare; Pen: Hare (2); Drop: Hare	"Report".	Try: Laird; Con: Akenhead; Pen: Akenhead; Drop: Cooper	Attendance: 18,000; Referee: Alan Welsby (Lancashire)

Team details

O	Dusty Hare
N	Mick Newton
M	Terry Burwell
L	Paul Dodge
K	Tim Barnwell
J	Les Cusworth
I	Steve Kenney
G	Garry Adey
H	Ian "Dosser" Smith
F	Steve Johnson
E	Arthur Hazelrigg
D	Nick Joyce
C	Steve Redfern
B	Peter Wheeler (c)
A	Robin Cowling
Replacements:
P	Angus Collington
Q	Brian Hall
R	Jim Kempin
S	Jez Krych
T	Tim Walley
U	John White
Coach:
Chalkie White

15	Richard Akenhead
14	Alan Thomas
13	Malcolm Swain
12	Barrie Corless
11	Bob Laird
10	Martin Cooper (c)
9	Chris Gifford
8	Derek Nutt
7	Nick Jeavons
6	Russ Field
5	Barry Ayre
4	John Beale
3	Kevin Astley
2	Gary Cox
1	W H Greaves
Replacements:
16	Andy Watson-Jones for Corless (30m)
17	Steve King for Nutt (50m)
Coach:

19 April 1980	Leicester	21–9	London Irish	Twickenham, London
	Pen: Hare (4); Drop: Hare; Cusworth (2)		Try: Smythe; Con: Meanwell; Pen: Meanwell	Attendance: 27,000; Referee: Colin High (Manchester/Cumbria)

Team details

O	Dusty Hare
N	Tim Barnwell
M	Clive Woodward
L	Paul Dodge
K	Terry Burwell
J	Les Cusworth
I	Steve Kenney
G	Garry Adey
H	Ian "Dosser" Smith
F	Steve Johnson
E	Nigel Gillingham
D	Nick Joyce
C	Steve Redfern
B	Peter Wheeler (c)
A	Robin Cowling
Replacements:
P	Angus Collington
Q	Mark Duffelen
R	Brian Hall
S	Andy Key
T	Mick Merriman
U	Ray Needham
Coach:
Chalkie White

15	Duncan Leopold
14	Roger McKibbin
13	Alastair McKibbin
12	Paul O'Donnell
11	Clive Meanwell
10	Hugh Condon
9	Barry Murphy
8	K S Short
7	John O'Driscoll (c)
6	Jim Sheehan
5	Mike Smythe
4	Walter Jones
3	Les White
2	Guy Beringer
1	Alex Newberry
Replacements:
16	David McCracken for Smythe (43m)
Coach:

2 May 1981	Leicester	22–15	Gosforth	Twickenham, London
	Try: Kenney; Barnwell; Hare; Con: Hare (2); Pen: Hare (3)		Try: Cunningham; Con: Johnson; Pen: Johnson (2); Patrick	Attendance: 24,000; Referee: Roger Quittenton (London & Sussex Societies)

Team details

O	Dusty Hare
N	Kevin Williams
L	Clive Woodward
M	Paul Dodge
K	Tim Barnwell
J	Les Cusworth
I	Steve Kenney
G	Garry Adey
H	Ian "Dosser" Smith
F	Steve Johnson
E	Nick Jackson
D	Nick Joyce
C	Steve Redfern
B	Peter Wheeler (c)
A	Robin Cowling
Replacements:
P	Angus Collington for Johnson (82m)
Q	Chris Tressler
R	Wayne Richardson
S	Mick Merriman
T	Andy Key
U	Brian Hall
Coach:
Chalkie White

15	Brian Patrick
14	Stuart Archer
13	Richard Breakey
12	Alan MacMillan
11	Neil McDowall
10	David Johnson
9	Malcolm Young
8	John Butler
7	Simon Smith
6	Terry Roberts
5	Steve Bainbridge
4	Bob Anderson
3	Jeff Bell
2	Bob Cunningham
1	Colin White (c)
Replacements:
16	Steve Gustard
17	John Storey
18	Ian Ramage
19	Stuart Lewis
20	John Blissett
21	Paul Simpson
Coach:
David Robinson

30 April 1983	Bristol	28–22	Leicester	Twickenham, London
	Try: Carr (2); Hogg; Hesford; Con: Barnes (3); Pen: Barnes (2)		Try: Evans; Smith; Con: Cusworth; Pen: Cusworth (4)	Attendance: 34,000; Referee: Roger Quittenton (London)

Team details

A	Huw Duggan
B	Alan Morley
C	Ralph Knibbs
D	Simon Hogg
E	John Carr
F	Stuart Barnes
G	Richard Harding
O	John Doubleday
N	Kevin Bogira
M	Austin Sheppard
L	Pete Polledri
K	Nigel Pomphrey
J	Alf Troughton
I	Mike Rafter (c)
H	Bob Hesford
Replacements:
P	Dave Palmer
Q	Phil Cue
R	Dave Sorrell
S	Lawrence Yandell
T	Mark Tomlin
U	Peter Stiff
Coach:
Dave Tyler

O	Ian Dodson
N	Barry Evans
M	Paul Dodge
L	Clive Woodward
K	Tim Barnwell
J	Les Cusworth
I	Nick Youngs
A	Stuart Redfern
B	Peter Wheeler
C	Steve Redfern
D	Nigel Gillingham
E	Malcolm Foulkes-Arnold
F	Steve Johnson (c)
H	Ian "Dosser" Smith
G	Dean Richards
Replacements:
P	Ian Bates for Barnwell
Q	Nick Jackson
R	Steve Kenney
S	Mike Poulson
T	Wayne Richardson
U	Chris Tressler
Coach:

29 April 1989	Bath	10–6	Leicester	Twickenham, London
	Try: Barnes; Pen: Barnes (2)		Pen: Hare (2)	Attendance: 59,300; Referee: Fred Howard (Liverpool)

Team details

16	John Palmer
15	Tony Swift
14	Simon Halliday
12	Jeremy Guscott
11	Fred Sagoe
10	Stuart Barnes (c)
9	Richard Hill
8	Dave Egerton
7	Jon Hall
6	Damian Cronin
5	John Morrison
4	Andy Robinson
3	Maurice 'Richard' Lee
2	Graham Dawe
1	Gareth Chilcott
Replacements:
16	Steve Knight
17	Keith Hoskin
18	Jimmy Deane
19	Victor Ubogu
20	Nigel Redman
21	Paul Simpson for Egerton
Coach:
Jack Rowell

O	Dusty Hare
N	Barry Evans
M	Paul Dodge (c)
L	Ian Bates
K	Rory Underwood
J	Les Cusworth
I	Aadel Kardooni
A	Stuart Redfern
B	Troy Thacker
C	Steve Redfern
D	Malcolm Foulks-Arnold
E	Tom Smith
F	John Wells
H	Ian "Dosser" Smith
G	Dean Richards
Replacements:
P	Tony Underwood
Q	Jez Harris
R	Steve Kenney
S	Dave Kitching
T	Chris Tressler
U	Adey Marriott
Coach:

1 May 1993	Leicester	23–16	Harlequins	Twickenham, London
	Try: Potter; Johnson; Con: Liley (2); Pen: Liley (2); Drop: Harris		Try: Glenister; Con: Challinor; Pen: Challinor (3)	Attendance: 54,000; Referee: Tony Spreadbury (Bath)

Team details

O	John Liley
N	Tony Underwood
M	Ian Bates
L	Stuart Potter
K	Rory Underwood
J	Jez Harris
I	Aadel Kardooni
G	Dean Richards
H	Neil Back
F	John Wells (c)
E	Matt Poole
D	Martin Johnson
C	Darren Garforth
B	Richard Cockerill
A	Graham Rowntree
Replacements:
P	Laurence Boyle
Q	Darren Grewcock
R	Dave Hopper
S	Chris Johnson
T	Simon Povoas
U	Nigel Richardson
Coach:
Ian "Dosser" Smith

15	Kent Bray
14	Chris Madderson
13	Will Carling
12	Gavin Thompson
11	Jeff Alexander
10	Paul Challinor
9	Rob Glenister
8	Chris Sheasby
7	Peter Winterbottom (c)
6	Mark Russell
5	Richard Langhorn
4	Alex Snow
3	Andy Mullins
2	Brian Moore
1	Jason Leonard
Replacements:
16	Richard Goodwin
17	Stuart Thresher
18	Mark Evans
19	Martin Hobley
20	Simon Dear
21	Nick Kilick
Coach:

7 May 1994	Bath	21–9	Leicester	Twickenham, London
	Try: Swift; Catt; Con: Callard; Pen: Callard (3)		Pen: Harris (3)	Attendance: 68,000; Referee: Ed Morrison (Bristol)

Team details

16	Jon Callard
15	Tony Swift
14	Phil de Glanville
12	Mike Catt
11	Adedayo Adebayo
10	Stuart Barnes
9	Richard Hill
8	Ben Clarke
7	Jon Hall (c)
6	Andy Robinson
5	Andy Reed
4	Nigel Redman
3	Victor Ubogu
2	Graham Dawe
1	Dave Hilton
Replacements:
16	Ian Sanders
17	Tim Beddow
18	John Mallett
19	Steve Ojomoh for Robinson (49m)
20	Ed Rayner
21	Audley Lumsden
Coach:
Jack Rowell

O	Wayne Kilford
N	Tony Underwood
M	Stuart Potter
L	Laurence Boyle
K	Rory Underwood
J	Jez Harris
I	Aadel Kardooni
G	Dean Richards (c)
H	Neil Back
F	John Wells
E	Matt Poole
D	Martin Johnson
C	Darren Garforth
B	Richard Cockerill
A	Graham Rowntree
Replacements:
P	Niall Malone
Q	Jamie Hamilton
R	Derek Jelley
S	Chris Johnson
T	Chris Tarbuck
U	Bill Drake-Lee
Coach:
Ian "Dosser" Smith

4 May 1996	Bath	16–15	Leicester	Twickenham, London
	Try: Penalty try Con: Callard; Pen: Callard (2); Drop: Catt		Try: Malone; Poole; Con: Liley; Pen: Liley	Attendance: 75,000 (World Record); Referee: Steve Lander (Liverpool)

Team details

16	Jon Callard
15	Audley Lumsden
14	Phil de Glanville (c)
12	Adedayo Adebayo
11	Jon Sleightholme
10	Mike Catt
9	Andy Nicol
8	Eric Peters
7	Steve Ojomoh
6	Andy Robinson
5	Nigel Redman
4	Martin Haag
3	John Mallett
2	Graham Dawe
1	Dave Hilton
Replacements:
16	Richard Butland
17	Ian Sanders
18	Darren Crompton
19	Neil McCarthy
20	Andy Reed
21	Ed Pearce
Coach:
Brian Ashton

O	John Liley
N	Steve Hackney
M	Stuart Potter
L	Richie Robinson
K	Rory Underwood
J	Niall Malone
I	Aadel Kardooni
G	Dean Richards (c)
H	Neil Back
F	John Wells
E	Matt Poole
D	Martin Johnson
C	Darren Garforth
B	Richard Cockerill
A	Graham Rowntree
Replacements:
P	Jez Harris
Q	Jamie Hamilton
R	Derek Jelley
S	Dorian West
T	Chris Tarbuck
U	Bill Drake-Lee
Coach:

10 May 1997	Leicester	9–3	Sale	Twickenham, London
	Pen: Joel Stransky 3		Pen: Simon Mannix	Attendance: 75,000; Referee: Brian Campsall (Yorkshire)

Team details

O	(Ireland) Niall Malone
N	(Scotland) Craig Joiner
M	(England) Will Greenwood
L	(England) Stuart Potter
K	(England) Leon Lloyd
J	(South Africa) Joel Stransky
I	(England) Austin Healey
G	(Ireland) Eric Miller
H	(England) Neil Back
F	(England) John Wells
E	(England) Matt Poole
D	(England) Martin Johnson (c)
C	(England) Darren Garforth
B	(England) Richard Cockerill
A	(England) Graham Rowntree
Replacements:
P	(England) Rob Liley
Q	(England) Aadel Kardooni
R	(England) Bill Drake-Lee
S	(England) Dean Richards
T	(England) Dorian West
U	(England) Steve Hackney
Dir of Rugby:
(Australia) Bob Dwyer

15	(England) Jim Mallinder (c)
14	(England) David Rees
13	(England) Jos Baxendell
12	(England) Adrian Hadley
11	(England) Tom Beim
10	(New Zealand) Simon Mannix
9	(England) Dewi Morris
8	(New Zealand) John Mitchell
7	(Ireland) Dylan O'Grady
6	(England) Neil Ashurst
5	(England) Dave Baldwin
4	(England) Dave Erskine
3	(England) Paul Smith
2	(England) Steve Diamond
1	(England) Paul Winstanley
Replacements:
16	John O'Reilly
17	Chris Yates
18	Andy Morris
19	Sean Fletcher
20	Luke Hewson
21	Murray Driver
Coach:

== Anglo-Welsh Cup ==
Launched in 2005 to replace the knock-out cup the Anglo-Welsh Cup is played with a group stage consisting of the 12 Premiership Rugby clubs and the 4 Welsh regions from the Pro12 then a knock out round between the group winners. Tigers have played in 4 finals, winning 3.

Win Loss

15 April 2007	Leicester Tigers	41–35	(Wales) Ospreys	Twickenham, London
14:30	Try: Varndell (2) 13' c, 63' c Croft 15' c Kay 26' c Tuilagi 30' c Con: Burke (4) 13', 15', 26', 30'; Goode 63'; Pen: Goode 54', 70'	"Report".	Try: Byrne 44' c S. Williams (2) 49' m, 57' c Walker 74' c Con: Hook (3) 44', 57', 74'; Pen: Hook (3) 2', 11', 37'	Attendance: 43,312; Referee: Alan Lewis (Ireland)

Team details

15	(England) Sam Vesty
14	(England) Tom Varndell
13	(England) Dan Hipkiss
12	(New Zealand) Daryl Gibson
11	(Samoa) Alesana Tuilagi
10	(Ireland) Paul Burke
9	(England) Harry Ellis
8	(England) Martin Corry (c)
7	(Ireland) Shane Jennings
6	(England) Tom Croft
5	(England) Ben Kay
4	(Ireland) Leo Cullen
3	(England) Julian White
2	(England) George Chuter
1	(Italy) Martin Castrogiovanni
Replacements:
16	(Ireland) Gavin Hickie
17	(Italy) Alex Moreno
18	(England) Louis Deacon
19	(England) Brett Deacon
20	(Ireland) Frank Murphy
21	(England) Andy Goode
22	(Ireland) Geordan Murphy
Coach:
(Australia) Pat Howard

15	(Wales) Lee Byrne
14	(Wales) Shane Williams
13	(Wales) Sonny Parker
12	(Wales) Andrew Bishop
11	(Scotland) Nikki Walker
10	(Wales) James Hook
9	(New Zealand) Justin Marshall
8	(New Zealand) Filo Tiatia
7	(Wales) Jonathan Thomas
6	(Wales) Ryan Jones
5	(Wales) Alun Wyn Jones
4	(Wales) Brent Cockbain
3	(Wales) Adam R Jones
2	(Wales) Huw Bennett
1	(Wales) Duncan Jones
Replacements:
16	(Wales) Barry Williams
17	(Wales) Paul James
18	(Wales) Mike Powell
19	(Wales) Richie Pugh
20	(New Zealand) Jason Spice
21	(Wales) Shaun Connor
22	(South Africa) Stefan Terblanche
Coach:
(Wales) Lyn Jones

12 April 2008	Leicester Tigers	6–23	(Wales) Ospreys	Twickenham, London
14:30	Pen: Goode (1/3) 6'; Drop: Goode 17'	"Report".	Try: A. Bishop 23' c A. W. Jones 48' c Con: Hook (2) 23', 48'; Pen: Hook (3/5) 58', 73', 76'	Attendance: 65,756; Referee: Alain Rolland (Ireland)

Team details

FB	15	(Ireland) Johne Murphy
RW	14	(England) Ollie Smith
OC	13	(England) Dan Hipkiss
IC	12	(New Zealand) Aaron Mauger
LW	11	(Samoa) Alesana Tuilagi
FH	10	(England) Andy Goode
SH	9	(England) Harry Ellis
N8	8	(England) Jordan Crane
OF	7	(New Zealand) Ben Herring
BF	6	(England) Martin Corry (c)
RL	5	(England) Ben Kay
LL	4	(England) Louis Deacon
TP	3	(Italy) Martin Castrogiovanni
HK	2	(England) George Chuter
LP	1	(England) Boris Stankovich
Replacements:
HK	16	(France) Benjamin Kayser
PR	17	(England) Julian White
LK	18	(England) Richard Blaze
FL	19	(England) Tom Croft
SH	20	(France) Christophe Laussucq
FH	21	(England) Sam Vesty
WG	22	(England) Tom Varndell
Coach:
(Argentina) Marcelo Loffreda

FB	15	(Wales) Lee Byrne
RW	14	(Wales) Jonny Vaughton
OC	13	(Wales) Sonny Parker
IC	12	(Wales) Andrew Bishop
LW	11	(Wales) Shane Williams
FH	10	(Wales) James Hook
SH	9	(New Zealand) Justin Marshall
N8	8	(New Zealand) Filo Tiatia
OF	7	(New Zealand) Marty Holah
BF	6	(Wales) Ryan Jones (c)
RL	5	(Wales) Ian Evans
LL	4	(Wales) Alun Wyn Jones
TP	3	(Wales) Adam R Jones
HK	2	(Wales) Richard Hibbard
LP	1	(Wales) Paul James
Replacements:
HK	16	(Wales) Huw Bennett
PR	17	(Wales) Duncan Jones
LK	18	(Wales) Ian Gough
FL	19	(Wales) Jonathan Thomas
FH	20	(Wales) Gareth Owen
CE	21	(Wales) Jonathan Spratt
WG	22	(Wales) Aled Brew
Coach:
(Wales) Lyn Jones

18 March 2012	Leicester Tigers	26–14	(England) Northampton Saints	Sixways Stadium, Worcester
15:00	Try: Mafi 25' c Hamilton 49' c Con: Ford (2/2) 25', 49'; Pen: Ford (4/4) 14', 18', 24', 45'	"Report".	Try: Day 74' m Pen: Myler (3/3) 5', 11', 21'	Attendance: 11,895; Referee: JP Doyle (England)

Team details

FB	15	(Ireland) Geordan Murphy (c)
RW	14	(Argentina) Horacio Agulla
OC	13	(England) Matt Smith
IC	12	(England) Billy Twelvetrees
LW	11	(New Zealand) Scott Hamilton
FH	10	(England) George Ford
SH	9	(England) James Grindal
N8	8	(England) Thomas Waldrom
OF	7	(New Zealand) Craig Newby
BF	6	(Tonga) Steve Mafi
RL	5	(England) Graham Kitchener
LL	4	(England) George Skivington
TP	3	(Samoa) Logovi'i Mulipola
HK	2	(England) Rob Hawkins
LP	1	(England) Boris Stankovich
Replacements:
HK	16	(England) Tom Youngs
PR	17	(Argentina) Marcos Ayerza
PR	18	(England) Julian White
LK	19	(England) Calum Green
FL	20	(Australia) Julian Salvi
SH	21	(Scotland) Scott Steele
FH	22	(England) Toby Flood
CE	23	(England) Andy Forsyth
Coach:
(England) Richard Cockerill

FB	15	(England) Paul Diggin
RW	14	(Russia) Vasily Artemyev
OC	13	(Samoa) George Pisi
IC	12	(Ireland) James Downey
LW	11	(England) Scott Armstrong
FH	10	(England) Stephen Myler
SH	9	(Wales) Martin Roberts
N8	8	(Ireland) Roger Wilson
OF	7	(England) Tom Wood
BF	6	(England) Calum Clark (c)
RL	5	(England) Christian Day
LL	4	(England) James Craig
TP	3	(England) Paul Doran-Jones
HK	2	(England) Andy Long
LP	1	(Tonga) Soane Tongaʻuiha
Replacements:
HK	16	(England) Ross McMillan
PR	17	(England) Alex Waller
PR	18	(South Africa) Brian Mujati
LK	19	(New Zealand) Mark Sorenson
FL	20	(England) Ben Nutley
SH	21	(England) Ryan Glynn
FH	22	(England) Ryan Lamb
CE	23	(England) Tom May
Coach:
(England) Jim Mallinder

19 March 2017	Exeter Chiefs (England)	12–16	Leicester Tigers	Twickenham Stoop, London
15:00	Try: Short 15' m S. Simmonds 77' c Con: Hooley 77'	"Report".	Try: Brady 18' c Con: Burns (1/1) 19'; Pen: Freddie Burns 12', 25', 40+1'	Attendance: 6,834; Referee: Tom Foley

Team details

FB	15	(Australia) Lachlan Turner
RW	14	(England) Matt Jess
OC	13	(England) Max Bodilly
IC	12	(England) Sam Hill
LW	11	(England) James Short
FH	10	(England) Joe Simmonds
SH	9	(England) Jack Maunder
N8	8	(England) Sam Simmonds
OF	7	(Australia) Julian Salvi (c)
BF	6	(England) Dave Ewers
RL	5	(Scotland) Ollie Atkins
LL	4	(Wales) Damian Welch
TP	3	(Australia) Greg Holmes
HK	2	(South Africa) Shaun Malton
LP	1	(England) Carl Rimmer
Replacements:
HK	16	(Tonga) Elvis Taione
PR	17	(England) Billy Keast
PR	18	(Scotland) Jack Owlett
FL	19	(England) Sam Skinner
N8	20	(England) Tom Johnson
SH	21	(England) Haydn Thomas
FH	22	(England) Will Hooley
CE	23	(England) Tom Hendrickson
Coach:
(England) Rob Baxter

FB	15	(England) George Worth
RW	14	(Australia) Peter Betham
OC	13	(England) Mathew Tait (c)
IC	12	(Wales) Jack Roberts
LW	11	(England) Tom Brady
FH	10	(England) Freddie Burns
SH	9	(New Zealand) Jono Kitto
N8	8	(Australia) Lachlan McCaffrey
OF	7	(England) Harry Thacker
BF	6	(Zimbabwe) Mike Williams
RL	5	(England) Graham Kitchener
LL	4	(England) Harry Wells
TP	3	(England) Fraser Balmain
HK	2	(England) George McGuigan
LP	1	(England) Ellis Genge
Replacements:
HK	16	(England) Tom Youngs
PR	17	(Italy) Michele Rizzo
PR	18	(England) Greg Bateman
LK	19	(England) Dominic Barrow
FL	20	(Wales) Luke Hamilton
SH	21	(England) Ben White
FH	22	(Wales) Owen Williams
CE	23	(England) Matt Smith
Coach:
(New Zealand) Aaron Mauger

== Premiership Rugby Cup ==
Created in 2018 the Premiership Rugby Cup replaced the Anglo-Welsh Cup when the Welsh sides withdrew. Contested as a group stage followed by a knockout rounds Tigers have contested two finals, losing to Gloucester in 2024 before beating Exeter Chiefs in 2026.

Win Loss

15 March 2024	Gloucester	23–13	Leicester Tigers	Kingsholm, Gloucester
19:45	Try: S.Atkinson 47', Jordan 50'; Con: Barton 48', 51'; Pen: Evans 41', Barton 55', 65'	"Report".	Try: Liebenberg 74'; Con: Pollard 75'; Pen: Pollard (2) 24', 30'	Referee: Jack Makepeace

Team details

Gloucester
Leicester

FB	15	(England) Lloyd Evans
RW	14	(England) Alex Hearle
OC	13	(Wales) Max Llewellyn
IC	12	(England) Seb Atkinson
LW	11	(England) Ollie Thorley
FH	10	(England) George Barton
SH	9	(England) Caolan Englefield
N8	8	(England) Zach Mercer
OF	7	(England) Lewis Ludlow (C)
BF	6	(South Africa) Ruan Ackermann
RL	5	(England) Cam Jordan
LL	4	(England) Freddie Clarke
TP	3	(Russia) Kirill Gotovtsev
HK	2	(England) George McGuigan
LP	1	(Georgia (country)) Val Rapava-Ruskin
Substitutions:
HK	16	(England) Seb Blake
PR	17	(England) Harry Elrington
PR	18	(England) Jamal Ford-Robinson
LK	19	(England) Arthur Clark
FL	20	(England) Jack Clement
SH	21	(England) Charlie Chapman
CE	22	(England) Louis Hillman-Cooper
WG	23	(Wales) Josh Hathaway
Coach:
(England) George Skivington

FB	15	(England) Mike Brown
RW	14	(England) Josh Bassett
OC	13	(Scotland) Matt Scott
IC	12	(England) Dan Kelly
LW	11	(England) Ollie Hassell-Collins
FH	10	(South Africa) Handré Pollard
SH	9	(England) Tom Whiteley
N8	8	(South Africa) Kyle Hatherell
OF	7	(England) Matt Rogerson
BF	6	(South Africa) Hanro Liebenberg
RL	5	(Australia) Sam Carter
LL	4	(England) Harry Wells
TP	3	(England) Joe Heyes
HK	2	(England) Finn Theobald-Thomas
LP	1	(South Africa) Francois van Wyk
Substitutions:
HK	16	(England) Archie Vanes
PR	17	(England) James Whitcombe
PR	18	(England) Dan Richardson
LK	19	(Wales) Olly Cracknell
FL	20	(England) Emeka Ilione
SH	21	(England) Sam Edwards
CE	22	(England) Jamie Shillcock
WG	23	(England) Phil Cokanasiga
Coach:
(Australia) Dan McKellar

Player of the Match:
Cam Jordan (Gloucester)

Assistant referees:
Harry Walbaum
John Meredith
Television match official:
Dan Jones

15 March 2026	Leicester Tigers	66–14	Exeter Chiefs	Welford Road, Leicester
15:30	Try: Wand (2), van der Flier (2), Searle (2), Penalty try, Hamer-Webb, Haffar, O'Connor; Con: Searle (6), O'Connor	"Report".	Try: Vintcent, Haydon-Wood; Con: Hodge (2)	Referee: Hamish Smales

Team details

Leicester
Exeter

FB	15	(England) Orlando Bailey	(substituted off) 66'
RW	14	(Wales) Gabriel Hamer-Webb
OC	13	(England) Will Wand	(yellow card) 54'	(substituted off) 64'
IC	12	(England) Joseph Woodward
LW	11	(England) Ollie Hassell-Collins
FH	10	(England) Billy Searle	(substituted off) 49'
SH	9	(England) Tom Whiteley
LP	1	(England) Archie van der Flier	(substituted off) 49'
HK	2	(England) Charlie Clare	(substituted off) 49'
TP	3	(Scotland) Will Hurd	(substituted off) 49'
LK	4	(England) Harry Wells
LK	5	(South Africa) Hanro Liebenberg	(substituted off) 60'
BF	6	(England) Harry Palmer
OF	7	(Wales) Tommy Reffell (Captain)	(substituted off) 49'
N8	8	(Argentina) Joaquin Moro
Substitutions:
HK	16	(England) Finn Theobald-Thomas	(substituted on) 49'
PR	17	(England) Tarek Haffar	(substituted on) 49'
PR	18	(Sweden) Ale Loman	(substituted on) 49'
LK	19	(Wales) Osian Thomas	(substituted on) 60'
FL	20	(England) Joshua Manz	(substituted on) 49'
SH	21	(England) Charlie Beamand	(substituted on) 66'
FH	22	(Australia) James O'Connor	(substituted on) 49'
CE	23	(Australia) Izaia Perese	(substituted on) 64'
Coach:
(England) Geoff Parling

FB	15	(England) Josh Hodge
RW	14	(England) Paul Brown-Bampoe
OC	13	(England) Ollie Batson
IC	12	(England) Will Rigg
LW	11	(England) Campbell Ridl	(substituted off) 72'
FH	10	(England) Will Haydon-Wood	(substituted off) 62'
SH	9	(England) Tom Cairns	(substituted off) 62'
LH	1	(South Africa) Ethan Burger	(substituted off) 49'
HK	2	(South Africa) Joseph Dweba	(substituted off) 49'
TH	3	(South Africa) Khwezi Mona	(substituted off) 49'
LK	4	(England) Lewis Pearson (Captain)	(substituted off) 57'
LK	5	(England) Rus Tuima
BF	6	(Ireland) Martin Moloney	(yellow card) 47'
OF	7	(England) Finn Worley-Brady
N8	8	(Italy) Ross Vintcent	(substituted off) 57'
Substitutions:
HK	16	(Australia) Julian Heaven	(substituted on) 49'
PR	17	(England) Will Goodrick-Clarke	(substituted on) 49'
PR	18	(England) Tom Gulley	(substituted on) 49'
LK	19	(England) Joe Bailey	(substituted on) 57'
FL	20	(Wales) Christ Tshiunza	(substituted on) 57'
SH	21	(Scotland) Charlie Chapman	(substituted on) 62'
FH	22	(England) Ben Coen	(substituted on) 62'
FB	23	(Wales) Dan John	(substituted on) 72'
Coach:
(England) Rob Baxter

Player of the Match:
Billy Searle (Leicester)

Assistant referees:
Harry Walbaum
George Selwood
Television match official:
Peter Allan

== Premiership Final ==
=== Zurich Championship ===
A precursor to the Premiership playoffs it was contested as a stand-alone tournament in 2001 and 2002.

Win Loss

13 May 2001	Leicester Tigers	22–10	Bath	Twickenham, London
	Try: M.Johnson, Healey, Stanley; Con: Stimpson (2); Pen: Stimpson	Report 1	Try: Thirlby; Con: Perry; Pen: Perry	Attendance: 33,500; Referee: Steve Lander

=== Premiership Final ===
Since 2003 the Champion of Premiership Rugby has been decided by a playoff system between the top sides after the regular season. Tigers have played in 11 finals, winning 5.

14 May 2005	Leicester Tigers	14–39	London Wasps	Twickenham, London
15:30	Try: Bemand; Pen: Goode (3)	Report 1 Report 2	Try: Hoadley; Van Gisbergen; Voyce; Con: Van Gisbergen (3); Pen: Van Gisbergen (5); Drop: King	Attendance: 60,762; Referee: Chris White

Team details

FB	15	(England) Sam Vesty
RW	14	(Ireland) Geordan Murphy
OC	13	(England) Ollie Smith
IC	12	(New Zealand) Daryl Gibson
LW	11	(England) Leon Lloyd
FH	10	(England) Andy Goode
SH	9	(England) Harry Ellis
N8	8	(England) Martin Corry
OF	7	(England) Neil Back
BF	6	(England) Louis Deacon
RL	5	(England) Ben Kay
LL	4	(England) Martin Johnson (c)
TP	3	(England) Julian White
HK	2	(England) George Chuter
LP	1	(Wales) Darren Morris
Replacements:
HK	16	(England) James Buckland
PR	17	(England) Graham Rowntree
FL	18	(England) Lewis Moody
FL	19	(England) Will Johnson
SH	20	(England) Scott Bemand
WG	21	(England) Austin Healey
WG	22	(Samoa) Alesana Tuilagi
	Coach: (England) John Wells

FB	15	(New Zealand) Mark van Gisbergen
RW	14	(England) Paul Sackey
OC	13	(England) Ayoola Erinle
IC	12	(England) Josh Lewsey
LW	11	(England) Tom Voyce
FH	10	(England) Alex King
SH	9	(England) Matt Dawson
N8	8	(England) Lawrence Dallaglio (c)
OF	7	(England) Joe Worsley
BF	6	(England) John Hart
RL	5	(England) Richard Birkett
LL	4	(England) Simon Shaw
TP	3	(England) Will Green
HK	2	(England) Phil Greening
LP	1	(England) Tim Payne
Replacements:
HK	16	(Samoa) Trevor Leota
PR	17	(New Zealand) Craig Dowd
LK	18	(England) Mark Lock
FL	19	(England) Martin Purdy
SH	20	(Wales) Warren Fury
FH	21	(England) James Brookes
FB	22	(England) Rob Hoadley
	Coach: (New Zealand) Warren Gatland

27 May 2006	Sale Sharks	45–20	Leicester Tigers	Twickenham, London
16:00	Tries: Cueto 8' m Lund 17' m Oriol Ripol 40' c Mayor 80' c Con: Hodgson (1/3); Courrent (1/1); Pen: Hodgson (6) 3', 31', 45', 49', 64', 78'; DG: Hodgson 71'	Report 1 Report 2	Tries: Moody 10' c Hamilton 70' c Con: Goode (2/2); Pen: Goode (2) 35', 43'	Attendance: 58,000; Referee: Dave Pearson

Team details

FB	15	(England) Jason Robinson (c)
RW	14	(England) Mark Cueto
OC	13	(Wales) Mark Taylor	(substituted off) 67'
IC	12	(Samoa) Elvis Seveali'i
LW	11	(Spain) Oriol Ripol	(substituted off) 78'
FH	10	(England) Charlie Hodgson
SH	9	(England) Richard Wigglesworth	(substituted off) 74'
N8	8	(France) Sébastien Chabal
OF	7	(England) Magnus Lund
BF	6	(Scotland) Jason White
RL	5	(England) Chris Jones	(substituted off) 75'
LL	4	(Argentina) Ignacio Fernández Lobbe	(substituted off) 40'
TP	3	(England) Stuart Turner
HK	2	(England) Andy Titterell	(substituted off) 52'
LP	1	(France) Lionel Faure	(substituted off) 54'
Replacements:
HK	16	(France) Sébastien Bruno	(substituted on) 52'
PR	17	(Scotland) Barry Stewart	(substituted on) 54'
LK	18	(England) Dean Schofield	(substituted on) 40'
LK	19	(England) Christian Day	(substituted on) 75'
SH	20	(England) Ben Foden	(substituted on) 74'
FH	21	(France) Valentin Courrent	(substituted on) 78'
CE	22	(England) Chris Mayor	(substituted on) 67'
	Coach: (France) Philippe Saint-André

FB	15	(Ireland) Geordan Murphy
RW	14	(Samoa) Alesana Tuilagi	(substituted off) 46'
OC	13	(England) Ollie Smith
IC	12	(New Zealand) Daryl Gibson
LW	11	(England) Tom Varndell
FH	10	(England) Andy Goode
SH	9	(England) Harry Ellis	(substituted off) 52'
N8	8	(England) Martin Corry (c)
OF	7	(Ireland) Shane Jennings	(substituted off) 51'
BF	6	(England) Lewis Moody
RL	5	(England) Ben Kay
LL	4	(Ireland) Leo Cullen	(substituted off) 55'
TP	3	(England) Julian White
HK	2	(England) George Chuter	(substituted off) 63'
LP	1	(England) Graham Rowntree	(substituted off) 60'
Replacements:
HK	16	(England) James Buckland	(substituted on) 63'
PR	17	(England) Michael Holford	(substituted on) 60'
LK	18	(Scotland) Jim Hamilton	(substituted on) 55'
FL	19	(England) Louis Deacon	(substituted on) 51'
SH	20	(England) Austin Healey	(substituted on) 52'
WG	21	(England) Leon Lloyd
FB	22	(England) Sam Vesty	(substituted on) 46'
	Coach: (Australia) Pat Howard

12 May 2007	Gloucester	16 – 44	Leicester Tigers	Twickenham, London
14:30	Try: Lamb c Con: Walker (1/1); Pen: Walker (3)	Report 1 Report 2	Try: F.Murphy; Tuilagi (2); Corry; Goode; Jennings; Moody; Con: Goode (3/7); Pen: Goode	Attendance: 59,400; Referee: Dave Pearson

Team details

FB	15	(New Zealand) Willie Walker
RW	14	(England) Iain Balshaw
OC	13	(England) James Simpson-Daniel
IC	12	(England) Anthony Allen
LW	11	(England) Mark Foster
FH	10	(England) Ryan Lamb
SH	9	(England) Peter Richards	(substituted off) 53'
N8	8	(England) Luke Narraway
OF	7	(England) Andy Hazell
BF	6	(England) Peter Buxton (c)	(substituted off) 15'
RL	5	(England) Alex Brown
LL	4	(Wales) Will James	(substituted off) 78'
TP	3	(Italy) Carlos Nieto
HK	2	(France) Olivier Azam	(substituted off) 48'
LP	1	(England) Nick Wood	(substituted off) 54'
Replacements:
HK	16	(Wales) Mefin Davies	(substituted on) 48'
PR	17	(France) Christian Califano	(substituted on) 54'
LK	18	(England) Adam Eustace	(substituted on) 78'
FL	19	(England) Jake Boer	(substituted on) 15'
SH	20	(Scotland) Rory Lawson	(substituted on) 53'
CE	21	(England) Jake Adams
FB	22	(England) Jon Goodridge
Coach:
(England) Dean Ryan

FB	15	(Ireland) Geordan Murphy
RW	14	(Fiji) Seru Rabeni	(substituted off) 62'
OC	13	(England) Dan Hipkiss
IC	12	(England) Ollie Smith	(substituted off) 57'
LW	11	(Samoa) Alesana Tuilagi
FH	10	(England) Andy Goode
SH	9	(Ireland) Frank Murphy	(substituted off) 67'
N8	8	(England) Martin Corry (c)
OF	7	(Ireland) Shane Jennings	(substituted off) 70'
BF	6	(England) Lewis Moody
RL	5	(England) Ben Kay
LL	4	(England) Louis Deacon	(substituted off) 56'
TP	3	(England) Julian White	(substituted off) 67'
HK	2	(England) George Chuter	(substituted off) 70'
LP	1	(Argentina) Marcos Ayerza
Replacements:
HK	16	(England) James Buckland	(substituted on) 70'
PR	17	(Italy) Alejandro Moreno	(substituted on) 67'
LK	18	(Ireland) Leo Cullen	(substituted on) 56'
FL	19	(England) Brett Deacon	(substituted on) 70'
SH	20	(England) Ben Youngs	(substituted on) 67'
FH	21	(England) Sam Vesty	(substituted on) 57'
CE	22	(England) Tom Varndell	(substituted on) 62'
Coach:
(Australia) Pat Howard

31 May 2008	London Wasps	26–16	Leicester Tigers	Twickenham, London
15:00	Try: Rees 12' c Lewsey 37' c Con: Van Gisbergen (2/2); Pen: Van Gisbergen (4) 6', 24', 35', 72'	Report 1 Report 2	Try: Varndell 56'; Ellis 62'; Pen: Goode (2) 9', 29'	Attendance: 81,600; Referee: Wayne Barnes

Team details

FB	15	(England) Mark van Gisbergen
RW	14	(England) Paul Sackey
OC	13	(England) Fraser Waters
IC	12	(England) Dominic Waldouck	(substituted off) 79'
LW	11	(England) Josh Lewsey
FH	10	(England) Riki Flutey
SH	9	(Ireland) Eoin Reddan	(substituted off) 79'
N8	8	(England) Lawrence Dallaglio (c)	(substituted off) 67'
OF	7	(England) Tom Rees
BF	6	(England) James Haskell
RL	5	(England) Tom Palmer	(substituted off) 79'
LL	4	(England) Simon Shaw
TP	3	(England) Phil Vickery	(substituted off) 41'
HK	2	(France) Raphaël Ibañez	(substituted off) 61'
LP	1	(England) Tim Payne	(substituted off) 61'
Replacements:
HK	16	(New Zealand) Joe Ward	(substituted on) 61'
PR	17	(South Africa) Pat Barnard	(substituted on) 41'
LK	18	(England) Richard Birkett	(substituted on) 79'
FL	19	(England) Joe Worsley	(substituted on) 61'
SH	20	(Scotland) Mark McMillan	(substituted on) 79'
FH	21	(Ireland) Jeremy Staunton	(substituted on) 79'
N8	22	(England) John Hart	(substituted on) 67'
Coach:
(Scotland) Ian McGeechan

FB	15	(Ireland) Geordan Murphy
RW	14	(England) Tom Varndell
OC	13	(England) Dan Hipkiss		(substituted off) 41'
IC	12	(New Zealand) Aaron Mauger		(substituted off) 23'	(substituted on) 26'
LW	11	(Samoa) Alesana Tuilagi
FH	10	(England) Andy Goode
SH	9	(England) Harry Ellis		(substituted off) 80'
N8	8	(England) Jordan Crane
OF	7	(New Zealand) Ben Herring		(substituted off) 56'
BF	6	(England) Martin Corry (c)
RL	5	(England) Ben Kay
LL	4	(South Africa) Marco Wentzel		(substituted off) 54'
TP	3	(England) Julian White
HK	2	(Wales) Mefin Davies		(substituted off) 46'
LP	1	(England) Boris Stankovich		(substituted off) 56'
Replacements:
HK	16	(France) Benjamin Kayser		(substituted on) 46'
PR	17	(Argentina) Marcos Ayerza		(substituted on) 56'
LK	18	(England) Richard Blaze		(substituted on) 54'
FL	19	(England) Tom Croft		(substituted on) 56'
SH	20	(France) Christophe Laussucq		(substituted on) 80'
FH	21	(England) Sam Vesty
CE	22	(England) Ayoola Erinle	(substituted on) 23'	(substituted off) 26'	(substituted on) 41'
Coach:
(Argentina) Marcelo Loffreda

16 May 2009	Leicester Tigers	10–9	London Irish	Twickenham, London
17:30	Try: Crane 61' c Con: Dupuy (1/1); Pen: Dupuy 17'	Report; Report 2	Pen: D. Armitage 48', 71'; Drop: Hewat 1'	Attendance: 81,601; Referee: Wayne Barnes

Team details

FB	15	(Ireland) Geordan Murphy (c)
RW	14	(New Zealand) Scott Hamilton
OC	13	(England) Ayoola Erinle
IC	12	(England) Dan Hipkiss
LW	11	(Ireland) Johne Murphy	(substituted off) 20'
FH	10	(England) Sam Vesty
SH	9	(France) Julien Dupuy
N8	8	(England) Jordan Crane
OF	7	(England) Ben Woods	(substituted off) 59'
BF	6	(New Zealand) Craig Newby
RL	5	(England) Ben Kay
LL	4	(England) Tom Croft
TP	3	(England) Julian White	(substituted off) 74'
HK	2	(England) George Chuter	(substituted off) 57'
LP	1	(Argentina) Marcos Ayerza
Replacements:
HK	16	(France) Benjamin Kayser	(substituted on) 57'
PR	17	(England) Dan Cole	(substituted on) 74'
LK	18	(England) Louis Deacon
FL	19	(England) Lewis Moody	(substituted on) 59'
SH	20	(England) Harry Ellis
WG	21	(England) Matt Smith	(substituted on) 20'
WG	22	(England) Tom Varndell
	Coach: (England) Richard Cockerill

FB	15	(Australia) Peter Hewat	(substituted off) 62'
RW	14	(England) Adam Thompstone	(substituted off) 40'
OC	13	(England) Delon Armitage
IC	12	(Samoa) Seilala Mapusua
LW	11	(Samoa) Sailosi Tagicakibau
FH	10	(England) Mike Catt
SH	9	(England) Paul Hodgson
N8	8	(Tonga) Chris Hala'ufia
OF	7	(England) Steffon Armitage
BF	6	(England) Declan Danaher	(substituted off) 40'
RL	5	(Ireland) Bob Casey (c)
LL	4	(England) James Hudson
TP	3	(England) Richard Skuse	(substituted off) 63'
HK	2	(South Africa) Danie Coetzee	(substituted off) 71'
LP	1	(New Zealand) Clarke Dermody	(substituted off) 73'
Replacements:
PR	16	(England) Alex Corbisiero	(substituted on) 63'
HK	17	(England) James Buckland	(substituted on) 71'
PR	18	(England) Gary Johnson	(substituted on) 73'
FL	19	(England) Richard Thorpe	(substituted on) 40'
CE	20	(Samoa) Elvis Seveali'i	(substituted on) 62'
SH	21	(England) Peter Richards
FB	22	(England) Tom Homer	(substituted on) 40'
	Coach: (England) Toby Booth

29 May 2010	Leicester Tigers	33–27	Saracens	Twickenham, London
17:30	Try: Smith 13' c Youngs 27' c Hipkiss 76' c Con: Flood (3/3); Pen: Flood (4/6) 3', 19', 47', 57'	Report 1 Report 2	Try: Joubert (2) 17' m, 49' c Con: Jackson (1/2); Pen: Jackson (5/6) 2', 9', 25', 70', 75'	Attendance: 81,600; Referee: Dave Pearson

Team details

FB	15	(Ireland) Geordan Murphy (c)
RW	14	(New Zealand) Scott Hamilton
OC	13	(England) Matt Smith	(substituted off) 72'
IC	12	(England) Anthony Allen
LW	11	(Samoa) Alesana Tuilagi	(substituted off) 73'
FH	10	(England) Toby Flood
SH	9	(England) Ben Youngs
N8	8	(England) Jordan Crane
OF	7	(England) Lewis Moody	(substituted off) 67'
BF	6	(England) Tom Croft
RL	5	(England) Geoff Parling
LL	4	(England) Louis Deacon
TP	3	(Italy) Martin Castrogiovanni	(substituted off) 51'
HK	2	(England) George Chuter
LP	1	(Argentina) Marcos Ayerza	(substituted off) 52' (substituted on) 61'
Replacements:
HK	16	(New Zealand) Joe Duffey
PR	17	(England) Boris Stankovich	(substituted on) 52' (substituted off) 61'
PR	18	(England) Dan Cole	(substituted on) 51'
LK	19	(New Zealand) Craig Newby	(substituted on) 67'
N8	20	(England) Ben Woods
SH	21	(England) James Grindal
FH	22	(Ireland) Jeremy Staunton	(substituted on) 73'
CE	23	(England) Dan Hipkiss	(substituted on) 72'
	Coach: (England) Richard Cockerill

FB	15	(England) Alex Goode
RW	14	(Fiji) Michael Tagicakibau	(substituted off) 58'
OC	13	(England) Adam Powell
IC	12	(England) Brad Barritt
LW	11	(United States) Chris Wyles
FH	10	(New Zealand) Glen Jackson
SH	9	(South Africa) Neil de Kock	(substituted off) 64'
N8	8	(South Africa) Ernst Joubert
OF	7	(England) Andy Saull	(substituted off) 64'
BF	6	(Namibia) Jacques Burger
RL	5	(England) Hugh Vyvyan
LL	4	(England) Steve Borthwick (c)	(substituted off) 44'
TP	3	(South Africa) Petrus du Plessis
HK	2	(South Africa) Schalk Brits
LP	1	(Italy) Matías Agüero	(substituted off) 51'
Replacements:
HK	16	(Italy) Fabio Ongaro
PR	17	(Wales) Rhys Gill	(substituted on) 51'
PR	18	(England) Richard Skuse
LK	19	(England) Mouritz Botha	(substituted on) 44'
FL	20	(South Africa) Justin Melck	(substituted on) 64'
SH	21	(New Zealand) Justin Marshall	(substituted on) 64'
CE	22	(South Africa) Derick Hougaard
WG	23	(Fiji) Kameli Ratuvou	(substituted on) 58'
	Coach: (South Africa) Brendan Venter

28 May 2011	Leicester Tigers	18–22	Saracens	Twickenham, London
15:00	Pen: Flood (6/8) 9', 18', 38', 49', 68', 74'	Report	Try: Short 28' c Con: Farrell (1/1); Pen: Farrell (5/5) 6', 20', 35', 43', 73'	Attendance: 80,016; Referee: Wayne Barnes

Team details

FB	15	(New Zealand) Scott Hamilton	(substituted off) 74'
RW	14	(Argentina) Horacio Agulla
OC	13	(England) Matt Smith
IC	12	(England) Anthony Allen
LW	11	(Samoa) Alesana Tuilagi
FH	10	(England) Toby Flood
SH	9	(England) Ben Youngs (yellow card) 5'
N8	8	(England) Jordan Crane	(substituted off) 49'	(substituted on) 64'
OF	7	(New Zealand) Craig Newby (c)	(substituted off) 64'
BF	6	(England) Tom Croft
RL	5	(England) George Skivington
LL	4	(Tonga) Steve Mafi	(substituted off) 71'
TP	3	(Italy) Martin Castrogiovanni	(substituted off) 52'
HK	2	(England) George Chuter	(substituted off) 69'
LP	1	(Argentina) Marcos Ayerza	(substituted off) 77'
Replacements:
HK	16	(England) Rob Hawkins	(substituted on) 69'
PR	17	(England) Boris Stankovich	(substituted on) 77'
PR	18	(England) Dan Cole	(substituted on) 52'
LK	19	(England) Ed Slater	(substituted on) 71'
N8	20	(England) Thomas Waldrom	(substituted on) 49'
SH	21	(England) James Grindal
FH	22	(Ireland) Jeremy Staunton
CE	23	(England) Billy Twelvetrees	(substituted on) 74'
	Coach: (England) Richard Cockerill

FB	15	(England) Alex Goode
RW	14	(England) David Strettle
OC	13	(United States) Chris Wyles
IC	12	(England) Brad Barritt
LW	11	(England) James Short
FH	10	(England) Owen Farrell
SH	9	(South Africa) Neil de Kock	(substituted off) 49'
N8	8	(South Africa) Ernst Joubert	(substituted off) 30'	(substituted on) 33'
OF	7	(Namibia) Jacques Burger
BF	6	(Scotland) Kelly Brown
RL	5	(England) Mouritz Botha	(substituted off) 55'
LL	4	(England) Steve Borthwick (c)
TP	3	(Italy) Carlos Nieto	(substituted off) 59'
HK	2	(South Africa) Schalk Brits
LP	1	(England) Matt Stevens	(substituted off) 51'
Replacements:
HK	16	(England) Jamie George
PR	17	(Wales) Rhys Gill	(substituted on) 51'
PR	18	(South Africa) Petrus du Plessis	(substituted on) 59'
LK	19	(England) Hugh Vyvyan	(substituted on) 55'
N8	20	(England) Andy Saull	(substituted on) 30'	(substituted off) 33'
SH	21	(England) Richard Wigglesworth	(substituted on) 49'
CE	22	(England) Nils Mordt
WG	23	(England) Noah Cato
	Coach: (South Africa) Brendan Venter

26 May 2012	Harlequins	30–23	Leicester Tigers	Twickenham, London
15:00	Try: Williams 9', Robshaw 56'; Con: Evans (1/2); Pen: Evans (6/7) 1', 22', 38', 44', 67', 55'	Report 1 Report 2	Try: Mafi 30' c, Allen 66' c Con: Ford (2/2); Pen: Ford (3/3) 14', 27', 69'	Attendance: 81,779; Referee: Wayne Barnes

Team details

FB	15	(England) Mike Brown
RW	14	(England) Tom Williams
OC	13	(England) George Lowe
IC	12	(England) Jordan Turner-Hall
LW	11	(England) Ugo Monye
FH	10	(New Zealand) Nick Evans (substituted off) 76'
SH	9	(England) Danny Care
N8	8	(England) Nick Easter
OF	7	(England) Chris Robshaw (c)
BF	6	(Samoa) Maurie Fa'asavalu (substituted off) 72'
RL	5	(England) George Robson
LL	4	(England) Ollie Kohn
TP	3	(Samoa) James Johnston
HK	2	(England) Joe Gray
LP	1	(England) Joe Marler
Replacements:
HK	16	(England) Rob Buchanan
PR	17	(England) Mark Lambert
PR	18	(England) Will Collier
LK	19	(Argentina) Tomás Vallejos
N8	20	(England) Tom Guest (substituted on) 72'
SH	21	(England) Karl Dickson
FH	22	(England) Rory Clegg (substituted on) 76'
CE	23	(England) Matt Hopper
	Coach: (Ireland) Conor O'Shea

FB	15	(Ireland) Geordan Murphy (c)
RW	14	(Argentina) Horacio Agulla (substituted off) 73'
OC	13	(England) Manu Tuilagi
IC	12	(England) Anthony Allen
LW	11	(Samoa) Alesana Tuilagi
FH	10	(England) George Ford (substituted off) 73'
SH	9	(England) Ben Youngs
N8	8	(England) Thomas Waldrom (yellow card) 38'
OF	7	(Australia) Julian Salvi
BF	6	(Tonga) Steve Mafi
RL	5	(England) Geoff Parling
LL	4	(England) George Skivington (substituted off) 73'
TP	3	(England) Dan Cole (substituted off) 55'
HK	2	(England) George Chuter (substituted off) 61'
LP	1	(Argentina) Marcos Ayerza (substituted off) 73'
Replacements:
HK	16	(England) Tom Youngs (substituted on) 61'
PR	17	(Samoa) Logovi'i Mulipola (substituted on) 73'
PR	18	(Italy) Martin Castrogiovanni (substituted on) 55'
LK	19	(England) Graham Kitchener (substituted on) 73'
FL	20	(New Zealand) Craig Newby
SH	21	(England) Sam Harrison
FH	22	(England) Billy Twelvetrees (substituted on) 73'
WG	23	(New Zealand) Scott Hamilton (substituted on) 73'
	Coach: (England) Richard Cockerill

25 May 2013	Leicester Tigers	37–17	Northampton Saints	Twickenham, London
15:00	Try: Morris 8' c, Kitchener 48', Tuilagi 66', Goneva 74'; Con: Flood (1/1) Ford (0/3); Pen: Flood 5' Ford 40+2', 56', 81'	Report	Try: Myler 15', Foden 44', Dickson 57' c Con: Myler (1/3)	Attendance: 81,703; Referee: Wayne Barnes

Team details

FB	15	(England) Mathew Tait
RW	14	(Ireland) Niall Morris
OC	13	(England) Manu Tuilagi
IC	12	(England) Anthony Allen
LW	11	(Fiji) Vereniki Goneva (substituted off) 75'
FH	10	(England) Toby Flood (c) (substituted off) 24'
SH	9	(England) Ben Youngs (substituted off) 75'
N8	8	(England) Jordan Crane (substituted off) 73'
OF	7	(Australia) Julian Salvi
BF	6	(England) Tom Croft
RL	5	(England) Geoff Parling
LL	4	(England) Graham Kitchener (substituted off) 56'
TP	3	(England) Dan Cole (substituted off) 68'
HK	2	(England) Tom Youngs (substituted off) 68'
LP	1	(Samoa) Logovi'i Mulipola (substituted off) 75'
Substitutions:
HK	16	(England) Rob Hawkins (substituted on) 68'
PR	17	(England) Fraser Balmain (substituted on) 75'
PR	18	(Italy) Martin Castrogiovanni (substituted on) 68'
LK	19	(England) Ed Slater (substituted on) 56'
FL	20	(Tonga) Steve Mafi (substituted on) 73'
SH	21	(England) Sam Harrison (substituted on) 75'
FH	22	(England) George Ford (substituted on) 24'
WG	23	(England) Matt Smith (substituted on) 75'
Coach:
(England) Richard Cockerill

FB	15	(England) Ben Foden (substituted off) 68'
RW	14	(Samoa) Ken Pisi
OC	13	(New Zealand) James Wilson
IC	12	(England) Luther Burrell
LW	11	(England) Jamie Elliott (substituted off) 40'
FH	10	(England) Stephen Myler (substituted off) 68'
SH	9	(England) Lee Dickson (substituted off) 68'
N8	8	(United States) Samu Manoa
OF	7	(England) Tom Wood
BF	6	(England) Phil Dowson (substituted off) 68'
RL	5	(England) Christian Day (substituted off) 60'
LL	4	(England) Courtney Lawes
TP	3	(South Africa) Brian Mujati (substituted off) 57'
HK	2	(England) Dylan Hartley (c) (red card) 40+1'
LP	1	(Tonga) Soane Tongaʻuiha (substituted off) 56'
Substitutions:
HK	16	(England) Mike Haywood (substituted on) 40'
PR	17	(England) Alex Waller (substituted on) 56'
PR	18	(England) Tom Mercey (substituted on) 57'
FL	19	(England) Ben Nutley (substituted on) 68'
LK	20	(South Africa) Gerrit-Jan van Velze (substituted on) 60'
SH	21	(Wales) Martin Roberts (substituted on) 68'
FH	22	(England) Ryan Lamb (substituted on) 68'
FB	23	(Samoa) George Pisi (substituted on) 68'
Coach:
(England) Jim Mallinder

18 June 2022	Leicester Tigers	15 - 12	Saracens	Twickenham
15:00	Try: Liebenberg 26', Wiese 35'; Con: Burns (28'); Drop: Burns (80')	"Match report". Leicester Mercury. 18 June 2022.	Pen: Farrell 5', 63', 75' Daly 30'	Attendance: 72,748; Referee: Wayne Barnes

Team details

FB	15	(England) Freddie Steward
RW	14	(England) Chris Ashton
OC	13	(Argentina) Matías Moroni (substituted off) 58'
IC	12	(England) Guy Porter
LW	11	(England) Harry Potter
FH	10	(England) George Ford (substituted off) 23'
SH	9	(England) Richard Wigglesworth (substituted off) 63'
N8	8	(South Africa) Jasper Wiese
OF	7	(Wales) Tommy Reffell (substituted off) 63'
BF	6	(South Africa) Hanro Liebenberg
RL	5	(England) Calum Green (substituted off) 63'
LL	4	(England) Ollie Chessum
TP	3	(England) Dan Cole (substituted off) 53'
HK	2	(Argentina) Julián Montoya (substituted off) 63'
LP	1	(England) Ellis Genge (substituted off) 63'
Substitutions:
HK	16	(England) Charlie Clare (substituted on) 63'
PR	17	(Samoa) Nephi Leatigaga (substituted on) 63'
PR	18	(England) Joe Heyes (substituted on) 53'
LK	19	(England) Harry Wells (substituted on) 63'
FL	20	(England) George Martin (substituted on) 63'
SH	21	(England) Ben Youngs (substituted on) 63'
FH	22	(England) Freddie Burns (substituted on) 23'
CE	23	(Scotland) Matt Scott (substituted on) 58' (yellow card) 75'
Coach:
(England) Steve Borthwick

FB	15	(England) Alex Goode
RW	14	(England) Max Malins
OC	13	(England) Elliot Daly
IC	12	(Wales) Nick Tompkins (substituted off) 71'
LW	11	(Scotland) Sean Maitland (substituted off) 41'
FH	10	(England) Owen Farrell
SH	9	(Wales) Aled Davies (yellow card) 25' (substituted off) 66'
N8	8	(England) Billy Vunipola (substituted off) 76'
OF	7	(England) Ben Earl
BF	6	(Samoa) Theo McFarland (substituted off) 59' (substituted on) 80'
RL	5	(England) Nick Isiekwe (substituted off) 80'
LL	4	(England) Maro Itoje
TP	3	(South Africa) Vincent Koch
HK	2	(England) Jamie George
LP	1	(England) Mako Vunipola (substituted off) 66'
Substitutions:
HK	16	(United States) Kapeli Pifeleti
PR	17	(Fiji) Eroni Mawi (substituted on) 66'
PR	18	(England) Alec Clarey
FL	19	(England) Jackson Wray (substituted on) 76'
FL	20	(Scotland) Andy Christie (substituted on) 59'
SH	21	(South Africa) Ivan van Zyl (substituted on) 66'
CE	22	(Scotland) Duncan Taylor (substituted on) 71'
CE	23	(England) Alex Lozowski (substituted on) 41'
Coach:
(Ireland) Mark McCall

14 June 2025	Bath	23–21	Leicester Tigers	Twickenham, London
15:00	Try: du Toit (27); Ojomoh (49); Con: Russell (28, 50); Pen: Russell (9, 40, 71)	Report 1 Report 2	Try: van Poortvliet (5), Kata (67), Ilione (75); Con: Pollard (5, 67, 75)	Attendance: 81,608; Referee: Karl Dickson

Team details

FB	15	(England) Tom de Glanville
RW	14	(England) Joe Cokanasiga
OC	13	(England) Max Ojomoh
IC	12	(Scotland) Cameron Redpath
LW	11	(England) Will Muir
FH	10	(Scotland) Finn Russell
SH	9	(England) Ben Spencer (c)
LH	1	(England) Beno Obano	(substituted off) 61'
HK	2	(England) Tom Dunn	(substituted off) 68'
TH	3	(South Africa) Thomas du Toit	(substituted off) 61'
LK	4	(Ireland) Quinn Roux	(substituted off) 61'
LK	5	(England) Charlie Ewels	(substituted off) 68'
BF	6	(England) Ted Hill
OF	7	(England) Guy Pepper
N8	8	(England) Miles Reid	(substituted off) 61'
Replacements:
HK	16	(Ireland) Niall Annett	(substituted on) 68'
LH	17	(South Africa) Francois van Wyk	(substituted on) 61'
TH	18	(England) Will Stuart	(substituted on) 61'
LK	19	(Ireland) Ross Molony	(substituted on) 68'
BF	20	(Scotland) Josh Bayliss	(substituted on) 61'
SH	21	(England) Tom Carr-Smith
FH	22	(England) Ciaran Donoghue
N8	23	(England) Alfie Barbeary	(substituted on) 61'
	Coach: (South Africa) Johann van Graan

FB	15	(England) Freddie Steward
RW	14	(England) Adam Radwan
OC	13	(Tonga) Solomone Kata
IC	12	(England) Joseph Woodward	(substituted off) 50'
LW	11	(England) Ollie Hassell-Collins
FH	10	(South Africa) Handré Pollard
SH	9	(England) Jack van Poortvliet	(substituted off) 54'
LH	1	(Wales) Nicky Smith	(substituted off) 68'
HK	2	(Argentina) Julián Montoya (c)	(yellow card) 28'
TH	3	(England) Joe Heyes	(substituted off) 68'
LK	4	(Scotland) Cameron Henderson
LK	5	(England) Ollie Chessum
BF	6	(South Africa) Hanro Liebenberg
OF	7	(Wales) Tommy Reffell	(substituted off) 29' (substituted on) 39' (substituted off) 54'
N8	8	(England) Olly Cracknell	(substituted off) 71'
Replacements:
HK	16	(England) Charlie Clare	(substituted on) 29' (substituted off) 39'
LH	17	(Ireland) James Cronin	(substituted on) 69'
TH	18	(England) Dan Cole	(substituted on) 69' (yellow card) 69'
N8	19	(England) Matt Rogerson	(substituted on) 71'
OF	20	(England) Emeka Ilione	(substituted on) 54'
SH	21	(England) Ben Youngs	(substituted on) 54'
FH	22	(Fiji) Ben Volavola
CE	23	(Australia) Izaia Perese	(substituted on) 50'
	Coach: (Australia) Michael Cheika

== European Cup Final ==
Launched in 1995 English sides joined the competition in the 1996-97 season. Known for sponsorship reasons as the Heineken Cup from 1995–2013 Tigers have reached 5 European Cup Finals, winning 2.

Win Loss

25 January 1997	Brive (France)	28–9	Leicester Tigers	Cardiff Arms Park, Cardiff
14:30 GMT	Tries: Viars; Fabre; Carrat (2); Con: Lamaison; Pen: Lamaison; Drop: Lamaison	Report	Pen: J.Liley (3)	Attendance: 41,664; Referee: Derek Bevan (Wales)

Team details

FB	15	(France) Sebastien Viars
RW	14	(France) Gerald Fabre
OC	13	(France) Christophe Lamaison
IC	12	(France) David Venditti
LW	11	(France) Sebastien Carrat
FH	10	(France) Alain Penaud (C)	(substituted off) 69'
SH	9	(France) Philippe Carbonneau
N8	8	(Poland) Gregori Kacala
OF	7	(France) Francois Duboisset	(substituted off) 49'
BF	6	(Belgium) Loic van der Linden	(substituted off) 77'
RL	5	(New Zealand) Grant Ross
LL	4	(France) Eric Alegret	(substituted off) 67'
TP	3	(France) Richard Crespy
HK	2	(France) Laurent Travers
LP	1	(France) Didier Casadeï	(substituted off) 70'
Replacements:
	16	(France) Romuald Paillat	(substituted on) 69'
	17	(France) Eric Bouti	(substituted on) 70'
	18	(Wales) Tony Rees	(substituted on) 67'
	19	(France) Yanni Domi	(substituted on) 77'
	20	(France) Thierry Labrousse	(substituted on) 49'
	21	(France) Sebastien Bonnet
	22	(France) Cédric Heymans

FB	O	(England) John Liley
RW	N	(England) Steve Hackney
OC	M	(England) Will Greenwood
IC	L	(England) Stuart Potter
LW	K	(England) Rory Underwood	(substituted off) 72'
FH	J	(England) Rob Liley
SH	I	(England) Austin Healey
N8	G	(England) Dean Richards (c)	(substituted off) 68'
OF	H	(England) Neil Back
BF	F	(England) John Wells
RL	E	(England) Matt Poole
LL	D	(England) Martin Johnson
TP	C	(England) Darren Garforth	(substituted off) 17' (substituted on) 22'
HK	B	(England) Richard Cockerill
LP	A	(England) Graham Rowntree
Replacements:
WG	P	(England) Leon Lloyd	(substituted on) 72'
LP	Q	(New Zealand) Perry Freshwater	(substituted on) 17' (substituted off) 22'
N8	R	(Ireland) Eric Miller	(substituted on) 68'
FH	S	(Ireland) Niall Malone
SH	T	(England) Aadel Kardooni
HK	U	(England) Dorian West
LK	V	(England) Neil Fletcher
Coach:
(Australia) Bob Dwyer

19 May 2001	Stade Français (France)	30–34	Leicester Tigers	Parc des Princes, Paris
15:00 CEST	Pen: Dominguez (9) 4', 16', 21', 27', 39', 46', 57', 68', 71'; Drop: Dominguez 77'	Report 1 Report 2	Try: Lloyd (2) 41' m, 79' c Back 59' c Con: Stimpson (2) 59', 79'; Pen: Stimpson (5) 6', 10', 30', 64', 73'	Attendance: 44,000; Referee: David McHugh (Ireland)

Team details

Stade Français	Leicester Tigers

FB	15	(France) Christophe Dominici
RW	14	(France) Thomas Lombard
OC	13	(France) Franck Comba
IC	12	(New Zealand) Cliff Mytton
LW	11	(France) Arthur Gomes
FH	10	(Italy) Diego Domínguez
SH	9	(Canada) Morgan Williams
N8	8	(France) Christophe Juillet
OF	7	(England) Richard Pool-Jones
BF	6	(France) Christophe Moni
RL	5	(Canada) Mike James
LL	4	(France) David Auradou
TP	3	(France) Pieter de Villiers
HK	2	(France) Fabrice Landreau	Yellow card
LP	1	(France) Sylvain Marconnet
Replacements:
OC	16	(France) David Venditti
FL	17	(France) Patrick Tabacco
HK	18	(France) Mathieu Blin
N8	19	(Uruguay) Pablo Lemoine
LK	20	(New Zealand) Darren George
LP	21	(France) Julien Berthe
SH	22	(France) Christophe Laussucq
Coach:
(Australia) John Connolly

FB	15	(England) Tim Stimpson
RW	14	(Ireland) Geordan Murphy		(substituted off) 76'
OC	13	(England) Leon Lloyd
IC	12	(Australia) Pat Howard
LW	11	(Canada) Winston Stanley
FH	10	(England) Andy Goode		(substituted off) 72'
SH	9	(England) Austin Healey
N8	8	(England) Will Johnson		(substituted off) 36'
OF	7	(England) Neil Back
BF	6	(England) Martin Corry
RL	5	(England) Ben Kay
LL	4	(England) Martin Johnson (c)	Yellow card
TP	3	(England) Darren Garforth
HK	2	(England) Dorian West
LP	1	(England) Graham Rowntree
Replacements:
OC	16	(South Africa) Glenn Gelderbloom		(substituted on) 76'
SH	17	(England) Jamie Hamilton		(substituted on) 72'
HK	18	(England) Richard Cockerill
LP	19	(England) Perry Freshwater
TP	20	(England) Ricky Nebbett
N8	21	(England) Paul Gustard		(substituted on) 36'
FL	22	(England) Lewis Moody
Coach:
(England) Dean Richards

25 May 2002	Leicester Tigers	15–9	(Ireland) Munster	Millennium Stadium, Cardiff
15:00 BST	Try: Murphy 26' m Healey 59' c Con: Stimpson 59'; Pen: Stimpson 70'	Report	Pen: O'Gara 7', 20', 49'	Attendance: 74,600; Referee: Joël Jutge (France)

Team details

Leicester Tigers	Munster

FB	15	(England) Tim Stimpson
RW	14	(Ireland) Geordan Murphy
OC	13	(England) Ollie Smith	(substituted off) 78'
IC	12	(Australia) Rod Kafer
LW	11	(Samoa) Freddie Tuilagi
FH	10	(England) Austin Healey
SH	9	(England) Jamie Hamilton	(substituted off) 52'
N8	8	(England) Martin Corry
OF	7	(England) Neil Back
BF	6	(England) Lewis Moody
RL	5	(England) Ben Kay
LL	4	(England) Martin Johnson (c)
TP	3	(England) Darren Garforth
HK	2	(England) Dorian West
LP	1	(England) Graham Rowntree	(substituted off) 74'
Replacements:
SH	16	(England) Harry Ellis	(substituted on) 52'
LP	17	(England) Perry Freshwater	(substituted on) 74'
OC	18	(South Africa) Glenn Gelderbloom	(substituted on) 78'
HK	19	(England) Richard Cockerill
N8	20	(England) Will Johnson
OF	21	(New Zealand) Josh Kronfeld
FH	22	(England) Andy Goode
Coach:
(England) Dean Richards

FB	15	(Ireland) Dominic Crotty	(substituted off) 66'
RW	14	(Ireland) John Kelly
OC	13	(Ireland) Rob Henderson	(substituted off) 68'
IC	12	(Ireland) Jason Holland
LW	11	(Ireland) John O'Neill
FH	10	(Ireland) Ronan O'Gara
SH	9	(Ireland) Peter Stringer
N8	8	(Ireland) Anthony Foley	(substituted off) 53'
OF	7	(Ireland) David Wallace
BF	6	(Ireland) Alan Quinlan
RL	5	(Ireland) Paul O'Connell	(substituted on) 62'
LL	4	(Ireland) Mick Galwey	(c)
TP	3	(Ireland) John Hayes
HK	2	(Ireland) Frankie Sheahan	(substituted off) 18' (substituted on) 29'
LP	1	(Ireland) Peter Clohessy	(substituted off) 61'
Replacements:
HK	16	(Ireland) James Blaney	(substituted on) 18' (substituted off) 29'
FL	17	(Australia) Jim Williams	(substituted on) 53'
LP	18	(Ireland) Marcus Horan	(substituted on) 61'
LK	19	(Ireland) Mick O'Driscoll	(substituted on) 62'
FH	20	(Ireland) Jeremy Staunton	(substituted on) 66'
WG	21	(Ireland) Mike Mullins	(substituted on) 68'
SH	22	(Ireland) Mike Prendergast
Coach:
(Ireland) Declan Kidney

20 May 2007	Leicester Tigers	9–25	(England) London Wasps	Twickenham, London
14:30 BST	Pen: Goode (3) 7', 15', 38'	Report	Try: Reddan 13' m Ibañez 34' m Pen: King (4) 4', 42', 49', 73'; Drop: King 54'	Attendance: 81,076; Referee: Alan Lewis (Ireland)

Team details

FB	15	(Ireland) Geordan Murphy
RW	14	(Fiji) Seru Rabeni
OC	13	(England) Danny Hipkiss
IC	12	(New Zealand) Daryl Gibson
LW	11	(Samoa) Alesana Tuilagi
FH	10	(England) Andy Goode
SH	9	(Ireland) Frank Murphy
N8	8	(England) Martin Corry (c)
OF	7	(Ireland) Shane Jennings
BF	6	(England) Lewis Moody
RL	5	(England) Ben Kay
LL	4	(England) Louis Deacon
TP	3	(England) Julian White
HK	2	(England) George Chuter
LP	1	(Argentina) Marcos Ayerza
Replacements:
HK	16	(England) James Buckland
PR	17	(Italy) Alex Moreno
LK	18	(Ireland) Leo Cullen
FL	19	(England) Brett Deacon
FH	20	(Ireland) Ian Humphreys
FH	21	(England) Sam Vesty
CE	22	(England) Ollie Smith
Coach:
(Australia) Pat Howard

FB	15	(England) Danny Cipriani
RW	14	(England) Paul Sackey
OC	13	(England) Fraser Waters
IC	12	(England) Josh Lewsey
LW	11	(England) Tom Voyce
FH	10	(England) Alex King
SH	9	(Ireland) Eoin Reddan
N8	8	(England) Lawrence Dallaglio (c)
OF	7	(England) Tom Rees
BF	6	(England) Joe Worsley
RL	5	(England) Tom Palmer
LL	4	(England) Simon Shaw
TP	3	(England) Phil Vickery
HK	2	(France) Raphaël Ibañez
LP	1	(England) Tom French
Replacements:
HK	16	(England) Joe Ward
PR	17	(Ireland) Peter Bracken
LK	18	(Samoa) Daniel Leo
FL	19	(England) James Haskell
CE	20	(Scotland) Mark McMillan
CE	21	(England) Dominic Waldouck
FB	22	(England) Mark van Gisbergen
Coach:
(Scotland) Ian McGeechan

Man of the Match:
(England) Fraser Waters (London Wasps)

Assistant referees
Alain Rolland (Ireland)
Simon McDowell (Ireland)
Fourth official
Peter Fitzgibbon (Ireland)
Television match official
David McHugh (Ireland)

23 May 2009	Leicester Tigers	16–19	(Ireland) Leinster	Murrayfield, Edinburgh
17:00 BST	Try: Woods 38' c Con: Dupuy (1/1); Pen: Dupuy (3/3) 8', 33', 42'	"Report". Archived from the original on 2015-04-02.	Try: Heaslip 49' c Con: Sexton (1/1); Pen: Sexton (2/3) 24', 70'; Drop: O'Driscoll (1/1) 5'; Sexton (1/1) 17'	Attendance: 66,523; Referee: Nigel Owens (Wales)

Team details

FB	15	(Ireland) Geordan Murphy (c)
RW	14	(New Zealand) Scott Hamilton
OC	13	(England) Ayoola Erinle
IC	12	(England) Dan Hipkiss
LW	11	(Samoa) Alesana Tuilagi
FH	10	(England) Sam Vesty
SH	9	(France) Julien Dupuy
N8	8	(England) Jordan Crane
OF	7	(England) Ben Woods
BF	6	(New Zealand) Craig Newby
RL	5	(England) Ben Kay
LL	4	(England) Tom Croft
TP	3	(Italy) Martin Castrogiovanni
HK	2	(England) George Chuter
LP	1	(Argentina) Marcos Ayerza
Substitutions:
HK	16	(France) Benjamin Kayser
PR	17	(England) Julian White
LK	18	(England) Louis Deacon
FL	19	(England) Lewis Moody
SH	20	(England) Harry Ellis
CE	21	(England) Ollie Smith
FH	22	(Ireland) Johne Murphy
Coach:
(England) Richard Cockerill

FB	15	(Fiji) Isa Nacewa
RW	14	(Ireland) Shane Horgan
OC	13	(Ireland) Brian O'Driscoll
IC	12	(Ireland) Gordon D'Arcy
LW	11	(Ireland) Luke Fitzgerald
FH	10	(Ireland) Johnny Sexton
SH	9	(Australia) Chris Whitaker
N8	8	(Ireland) Jamie Heaslip
OF	7	(Ireland) Shane Jennings
BF	6	(Australia) Rocky Elsom
RL	5	(Ireland) Malcolm O'Kelly
LL	4	(Ireland) Leo Cullen (c)
TP	3	(Cook Islands) Stan Wright
HK	2	(Ireland) Bernard Jackman
LP	1	(Ireland) Cian Healy
Substitutions:
HK	16	(Ireland) John Fogarty
PR	17	(Ireland) Ronan McCormack
LK	18	(Ireland) Devin Toner
FL	19	(Ireland) Seán O'Brien
SH	20	(Ireland) Simon Keogh
FB	21	(Ireland) Rob Kearney
FB	22	(Ireland) Girvan Dempsey
Coach:
(Australia) Michael Cheika

=== European Challenge Cup final ===
The European Rugby Challenge Cup is the second level of European competition, for those clubs who did not qualify for he main European Cup or in some years were knocked out in the group stages of the main competition. Leicester have reached one final, losing it to Montpellier.

Win Loss

21 May 2021	Leicester Tigers	17–18	(France) Montpellier	Twickenham, London
20:00	Try: Wells 33' c Wiese 46' c Con: G. Ford (2) 33', 46'; Pen: G. Ford 9'	"Report".	Try: Rattez 14' c Goosen 58' m Con: Paillaugue (1) 14'; Pen: Paillaugue (2) 16', 50'	Attendance: 10,000; Referee: Andrew Brace (Ireland)

Team details

FB	15	(England) Freddie Steward
RW	14	(England) Guy Porter	(substituted off) 20'
OC	13	(Argentina) Matías Moroni
IC	12	(Ireland) Dan Kelly
LW	11	(Fiji) Nemani Nadolo	(substituted off) 69'
FH	10	(England) George Ford
SH	9	(England) Richard Wigglesworth	(substituted off) 46'
N8	8	(South Africa) Jasper Wiese
OF	7	(South Africa) Cyle Brink	(substituted off) 30'
BF	6	(South Africa) Hanro Liebenberg
RL	5	(England) Calum Green	(substituted off) 74'
LL	4	(England) Harry Wells
TP	3	(England) Dan Cole	(substituted off) 54'
HK	2	(England) Tom Youngs (c)	(substituted off) 54'
LP	1	(England) Ellis Genge	(substituted off) 66'
Replacements:
HK	16	(England) Charlie Clare	(substituted on) 54'
PR	17	(South Africa) Luan de Bruin	(substituted on) 66'
PR	18	(England) Joe Heyes	(substituted on) 54'
LK	19	(Scotland) Cameron Henderson	(substituted on) 74'
FL	20	(Wales) Tommy Reffell	(substituted on) 30'
SH	21	(England) Ben Youngs	(substituted on) 46'
FB	22	(England) Zack Henry	(substituted on) 69'
WG	23	(Fiji) Kini Murimurivalu	(substituted on) 20'
Coach:
(England) Steve Borthwick

FB	15	(France) Anthony Bouthier
RW	14	(France) Arthur Vincent	(substituted off) 43'
OC	13	(South Africa) Johan Goosen
IC	12	(South Africa) Jan Serfontein	(substituted off) 63'
LW	11	(South Africa) Vincent Rattez
FH	10	(England) Alex Lozowski
SH	9	(South Africa) Benoît Paillaugue	(substituted off) 61'
N8	8	(France) Alexandre Bécognée	(yellow card) 30'
LF	7	(France) Yacouba Camara
RF	6	(France) Fulgence Ouedraogo	(substituted off) 28'
RL	5	(France) Paul Willemse	(substituted off) 77'
LL	4	(France) Florian Verhaeghe
TP	3	(France) Mohamed Haouas	(substituted off) 44'
HK	2	(France) Guilhem Guirado (c)	(yellow card) 46'	(substituted off) 65'
LP	1	(France) Enzo Forletta
Replacements:
HK	16	(South Africa) Bismarck du Plessis	(substituted on) 65'
PR	17	(South Africa) Rob Rodgers
PR	18	(United States) Titi Lamositele	(substituted on) 44'
LK	19	(Canada) Tyler Duguid	(substituted on) 77'
FL	20	(South Africa) Jacques du Plessis	(substituted on) 28'
SH	21	(South Africa) Cobus Reinach	(substituted on) 61'
FH	22	(South Africa) Handré Pollard	(substituted on) 63'
WG	23	(France) Gabriel N'Gandebe	(substituted on) 43'
Coach:
(France) Philippe Saint-André

== Other Finals ==
=== Zurich Wildcard ===
Played three times this was a mid-table playoff for a place in the following season's Heineken Cup.

Win Loss

31 May 2003	Leicester Tigers	27–20 (a.e.t.)	Saracens	Franklin's Gardens, Northampton
	Try: West 60'; Back 96'; Con: Stimpson; Pen: Stimpson (4); Drop: McMullen			Attendance: 8,066

29 May 2004	Sale Sharks	27–48	Leicester Tigers	Twickenham, London
			Try: Healey 29'; Gibson 40'; Lloyd (2) 42', 80'; Back 50', 69'; Con: Goode (3); Pen: Goode (4)	Attendance: 30,000

=== Orange Cup ===
The Orange Cup, named for sponsors Orange S.A., was played between the winners of the Premiership and Top 16, as it then was, as a pre-season trophy in the style of a Charity Shield.

25 August 2001	Stade Toulousain (France)	30–15	Leicester Tigers	Stade Ernest-Wallon, Toulouse
			Pen: Goode (4); Drop: Goode	Attendance: 15,000

24 August 2002	Biarritz Olympique (France)	13–14	Leicester Tigers	Parc des Sports Aguiléra, Biarritz
		Report 1 Report 2	Try: Hipkiss 36' c Booth 74' c Con: Stimpson 36'; Vesty 74'	Attendance: 3,000

== Sources and references ==
- Farmer, Stuart; Hands, David (2014). Tigers - Official history of Leicester Football Club. The Rugby Development Foundation. ISBN 978-0-9930213-0-5.
