= 1980–81 John Player Cup =

English rugby cup

Tournament statistics
- Champions: Leicester Tigers (3rd title)

The 1980–81 John Player Cup was the tenth edition of England's premier rugby union club competition at the time. Leicester won the competition for a third consecutive year defeating Gosforth in the final. The competition was extended with extra rounds replacing the previous format of 32 teams only. The event was sponsored by John Player cigarettes and the final was held at Twickenham Stadium.

== Draw and results ==
=== First round ===
Team one	Team two	Score
Sutton & Epsom	Crawley	3-13
Upper Clapton	Woodford	13-4
Metropolitan Police	Fullerians	22-12
High Wycombe	Midsomer Norton	12-9
Havant	Maidstone	10-9
Oxford	Bournemouth	3-3*
Matson	Exeter	8-14
Hereford	Walsall	15-15*
Coventry Welsh	Kettering	19-12
Alnwick	Broughton Park	0-12
Nottingham	Birmingham	33-10
Derby	Westleigh	12-7
Aspatria	Hartlepool Rovers	10-10*
Sale	Morley	29-10
Abbey	Redruthy	6-9

Away team progress*

=== Second round ===
Team one	Team two	Score
Upper Clapton	Crawley	18-0
Metropolitan Police	High Wycombe	25-9
Bournemouth	Havant	18-10
Blackheath	Exeter	11-15
Walsall	Coventry Welsh	6-4
Camp Hill	Broughton Park	6-3
Nottingham	Derby	12-9
Hartlepool Rovers	Sale	8-17
Guildford & Gosalming	Redruth	3-9
Stroud	Southend	13-16

=== Third round ===
Team one	Team two	Score
Bournemouth	Exeter	15-19
Moseley	Bedford	25-0
Camborne	Metropolitan Police	9-16
Harlequins	Rosslyn Park	9-20
Camp Hill	Nottingham	0-18
Richmond	Bath	6-12
Waterloo	West Hartlepool	17-0
Gosforth	Fylde	17-7
Roundhay	Leicester	3-34
Upper Clapton	Bristol	3-22
Northampton	Sale	13-20
Saracens	Coventry	7-15
Wasps	London Scottish	9-15
Orrell	Walsall	24-3
Redruth	London Irish	4-12
Southend	Gloucester	6-12

=== Fourth round ===
Team one	Team two	Score
London Irish	Gloucester	13-22
Waterloo	Gosforth	9-12
Exeter	Moseley	7-15
Metropolitan Police	Rosslyn Park	15-6
Nottingham	Bath	4-3
Leicester	Bristol	27-14
Sale	Coventry	18-12
London Scottish	Orrell	12-10

=== Quarter-finals ===
Team one	Team two	Score
Leicester	Sale	21-7
Moseley	Metropolitan Police	22-6
Nottingham	Gosforth	3-23
London Scottish	Gloucester	9-9*

London Scottish progressed on more tries rule*

=== Semi-finals ===
Team one	Team two	Score
London Scottish	Leicester	12-18 aet
Gosforth	Moseley	24-3

=== Final ===
2 May 1981

Leicester	22–15	Gosforth
Try: Steve Kenney; Tim Barnwell; Dusty Hare; Con: Dusty Hare 2 Pen: Dusty Hare 3		Try: Bob Cunnimgham; Con: David Johnson; Pen: David Johnson 2 Brian Patrick

Twickenham Stadium, London
Attendance: 24,000
Referee: Roger Quittenton (London & Sussex Societies)

O	Dusty Hare
N	Kevin Williams
L	Clive Woodward
M	Paul Dodge
K	Tim Barnwell
J	Les Cusworth
I	Steve Kenney
G	Garry Adey
H	Ian "Dosser" Smith
F	Steve Johnson
E	Nick Jackson
D	Nick Joyce
C	Steve Redfern
B	Peter Wheeler (c)
A	Robin Cowling
Replacements:
P	Angus Collington for Johnson (82m)
Q	Chris Tressler
R	Wayne Richardson
S	Mick Merriman
T	Andy Key
U	Brian Hall
Coach:
Chalkie White

15	Brian Patrick
14	Stuart Archer
13	Richard Breakey
12	Alan MacMillan
11	Neil McDowall
10	David Johnson
9	Malcolm Young
8	John Butler
7	Simon Smith
6	Terry Roberts
5	Steve Bainbridge
4	Bob Anderson
3	Jeff Bell
2	Bob Cunningham
1	Colin White (c)
Replacements:
16	Steve Gustard
17	John Storey
18	Ian Ramage
19	Stuart Lewis
20	John Blissett
21	Paul Simpson
Coach:
David Robinson
