= 1979–80 John Player Cup =

English rugby cup

Tournament statistics
- Champions: Leicester Tigers (2nd title)

The 1979–80 John Player Cup was the ninth edition of England's premier rugby union club competition at the time. Leicester won the competition for the second consecutive year defeating London Irish in the final. The attendance of 27,000 was a record. The event was sponsored by John Player cigarettes and the final was held at Twickenham Stadium.

== Draw and results ==
=== First round ===
| Team one | Team two | Score |
|---|---|---|
| Northampton | Nottingham | 0-3 |
| Harlequins | Esher | 23-6 |
| Bournemouth | Bristol | 6-35 |
| Hartlepool Rovers | Gosforth | 6-10 |
| Wigton | Moseley | 3-7 |
| Leicester | Orrell | 16-7 |
| London Scottish | Matson | 25-9 |
| Bedford | Wasps | 6-3 |
| Liverpool | Waterloo | 13-6 |
| Bath | Marlow | 30-6 |
| London Irish | Maidstone | 29-9 |
| Lichfield | Morley | 3-8 |
| Fylde | Coventry | 3-19 |
| Richmond | Gloucester | 6-6* |
| Weston-super-Mare | London Welsh | 3-13 |
| Rosslyn Park | Exeter | 24-7 |

Progressed as away team*

=== Second round ===
| Team one | Team two | Score |
|---|---|---|
| Moseley | Leicester | 7-17 |
| London Irish | Morley | 15-9 |
| Nottingham | Harlequins | 6-23 |
| Bristol | Gosforth | 3-14 |
| London Scottish | Bedford | 14-9 |
| Liverpool | Bath | 12-19 |
| Coventry | Gloucester | 9-10 |
| London Welsh | Rosslyn Park | 15-16 |

=== Quarter-finals ===
| Team one | Team two | Score |
|---|---|---|
| Leicester | London Scottish | 22-0 |
| Bath | London Irish | 3-6 |
| Harlequins | Gosforth | 9-3 |
| Gloucester | Rosslyn Park | 3-6 |

=== Semi-finals ===
| Team one | Team two | Score |
|---|---|---|
| Harlequins | Leicester | 9-16 |
| Rosslyn Park | London Irish | 6-6* |

Progressed as away team*

=== Final ===
19 April 1980

| Leicester | 21–9 | London Irish |
| Pen: Dusty Hare 4 Drop: Dusty Hare; Les Cusworth 2 | | Try: Mike Smythe; Con: Clive Meanwell; Pen: Clive Meanwell |

Twickenham Stadium, London
Attendance: 27,000
Referee: Colin High (Manchester/Cumbria)

| O | Dusty Hare |
| N | Tim Barnwell |
| M | Clive Woodward |
| L | Paul Dodge |
| K | Terry Burwell |
| J | Les Cusworth |
| I | Steve Kenney |
| G | Garry Adey |
| H | Ian "Dosser" Smith |
| F | Steve Johnson |
| E | Nigel Gillingham |
| D | Nick Joyce |
| C | Steve Redfern |
| B | Peter Wheeler (c) |
| A | Robin Cowling |
Replacements:
| P | Angus Collington |
| Q | Mark Duffelen |
| R | Brian Hall |
| S | Andy Key |
| T | Mick Merriman |
| U | Ray Needham |
Coach:
Chalkie White

| 15 | Duncan Leopold |
| 14 | Roger McKibbin |
| 13 | Alastair McKibbin |
| 12 | Paul O'Donnell |
| 11 | Clive Meanwell |
| 10 | Hugh Condon |
| 9 | Barry Murphy |
| 8 | Kevin Short |
| 7 | John O'Driscoll (c) |
| 6 | Jim Sheehan |
| 5 | Mike Smythe |
| 4 | Walter Jones |
| 3 | Les White |
| 2 | Guy Beringer |
| 1 | Alex Newberry |
Replacements:
| 16 | David McCracken for Smythe (43m) |
Coach:
