= 1977–78 John Player Cup =

English rugby cup

Tournament statistics

The 1977–78 John Player Cup was the seventh edition of England's premier rugby union club competition at the time. Gloucester won the competition defeating Leicester in the final. The event was sponsored by John Player cigarettes and the final was held at Twickenham Stadium.

== Draw and results ==
=== First round ===
Team one	Team two	Score
Leicester	Hartlepool Rovers	9-3
Gloucester	Lydney	38-6
US Portsmouth	Harlequins	6-19
Liverpool	Sale	18-4
Coventry	Wilmslow	7-6
Bristol	Falmouth	19-6
Richmond	Wasps	9-9*
Walsall	Northampton	8-16
Rosslyn Park	High Wycombe	58-0
Morley	Gosforth	3-12
Esher	London Irish	10-22
Saracens	London Welsh	
Exeter	Bath	20-6
Moseley	Blackheath	38-12
Waterloo	Bedford	10-4
Nottingham	Wakefield	

Progressed as away team*

=== Second round ===
Team one	Team two	Score
Leicester	Rosslyn Park	25-16
Gloucester	Gosforth	19-10
Harlequins	London Irish	17-15
Liverpool	London Welsh	13-9
Coventry	Exeter	34-0
Bristol	Moseley	14-0
Wasps	Waterloo	10-9
Northampton	Wakefield	21-4

=== Quarter-finals ===
Team one	Team two	Score
Harlequins	Liverpool	18-6
Coventry	Bristol	16-13
Gloucester	Wasps	13-3
Leicester	Northampton	20-11

=== Semi-finals ===
Team one	Team two	Score
Leicester	Coventry	25-16
Gloucester	Harlequins	12-6

=== Final ===
15 April 1978

Gloucester	6–3	Leicester
Try: Richard Mogg; Con: Peter Butler		Pen: Dusty Hare

Twickenham Stadium, London
Attendance: 24,000
Referee: Roger Quittenton (London)

15	Peter Butler
14	Bob Clewes
13	Brian Vine
12	Richard Jardine
11	Richard Mogg
10	Christopher Williams
9	Paul Howell
8	John Simonett
7	Vivian Wooley
6	John Watkins (c)
5	John Fidler
4	Stephen Boyle
3	Mike Burton
2	Stephen Mills
1	Gordon Sargent
Replacements:
16	Ron Etheridge
17	Dave Pointon
18	Peter Kingston
19	Mike Curran
20	Fred Reed
21	Eddie Pinkney
Coach:

O	Dusty Hare
N	John Duggan
M	Paul Dodge
L	Brian Hall (c)
K	Bob Barker
J	Bleddyn Jones
I	Steve Kenney
G	Dave Forfar
H	Garry Adey
F	Steve Johnson
E	Arthur Hazelrigg
D	Nick Joyce
C	Steve Redfern
B	Peter Wheeler
A	Ray Needham
Replacements:
P	Robin Money
Q	Bill Reichwald
R	Tim Walley
S	Angus Collington
T	John White
U	Dosser Smith
Coach:
Chalkie White
