= 1982–83 John Player Cup =

Rugby cup

Tournament statistics

The 1982–83 John Player Cup was the 12th edition of England's premier rugby union club competition at the time. Bristol won the competition defeating Leicester in the final. The event was sponsored by John Player cigarettes and the final was held at Twickenham Stadium.

== Draw and results ==
=== First round ===
Team one	Team two	Score
Hertford	Saracens	6-15
East Grinstead	Sudbury	9-22
U.S Portsmouth	Old Gaytonians	13-13*
Kettering	Lichfield	9-11
Worcester	Stoke Old Boys	10-6
Northampton	Hinckley	31-4
Birmingham	Stamford	14-11
West Hartlepool	Morpeth	24-3
Sheffield	Sale	6-7
Aspatria	Fylde	6-20
Wimborne	Oxford	3-3*
High Wycombe	Exeter	26-16
Stroud	St Ives	6-9
Keynsham	Maidenhead	12-15

Away team progress*

=== Second round ===
Team one	Team two	Score
Bromsgrove	Lichfield	4-8
Fylde	Worcester	13-3
Maidenhead	Lydney	7-26
Old Emmanuel	Norwich	6-6*
Oxford	High Wycombe	3-12
St Ives	Old Gaytonians	3-0
Sale	Birmingham	24-6
Saracens	Sidcup	11-0
Sudbury	Metropolitan Police	0-35
West Hartlepool	Northampton	27-3

=== Third round ===
Team one	Team two	Score
Wakefield	Plymouth Albion	10-0
Metropolitan Police	St Ives	6-11
Coventry	Moseley	25-3
Liverpool	Nottingham	13-27
Lydney	Sale	9-16
Rosslyn Park	Wasps	9-15
London Scottish	Broughton Park	?-12
London Irish	Orrell	6-9
Bedford	Saracens	21-0
Harrogate	Bristol	15-33
Harlequins	Gosforth	24-15
Lichfield	Norwich	20-3
Leicester	High Wycombe	47-18
Camborne	West Hartlepool	3-33
Blackheath	Fylde	12-9
Gloucester	London Welsh	3-14

=== Fourth round ===
Team one	Team two	Score
Leicester	Wakefield	30-14
Bedford	Bristol	10-20
Orrell	Coventry	4-6
Sale	Harlequins	19-33
West Hartlepool	Wasps	18-12
Blackheath	London Scottish	9-10
London Welsh	Lichfield	24-6
Nottingham	St Ives	20-3

=== Quarter-finals ===
Team one	Team two	Score
London Welsh	London Scottish	6-15
Leicester	Harlequins	18-4
West Hartlepool	Bristol	14-16
Coventry	Nottingham	19-9

=== Semi-finals ===
Team one	Team two	Score
London Scottish	Leicester	9-30
Coventry	Bristol	3-23

=== Final ===
30 April 1983

Bristol	28–22	Leicester
Try: Carr 2 Hogg; Hesford; Con: Barnes 3 Pen: Barnes 2		Try: Evans; Smith; Con: Cusworth; Pen: Cusworth 4

Twickenham Stadium, London
Attendance: 34,000
Referee: Roger Quittenton (London)

Bristol
Leicester

A	Huw Duggan
B	Alan Morley
C	Ralph Knibbs
D	Simon Hogg
E	John Carr
F	Stuart Barnes
G	Richard Harding
H	John Doubleday
I	Kevin Bogira
J	Austin Sheppard
K	Alf Troughton
L	Nigel Pomphrey
M	Pete Polledri
N	Mike Rafter (c)
O	Bob Hesford
Replacements:
P	Dave Palmer
Q	Phil Cue
R	Dave Sorrell
S	Lawrence Yandell
T	Mark Tomlin
U	Peter Stiff
Coach:
Dave Tyler

O	Ian Dodson
N	Barry Evans
M	Paul Dodge
L	Clive Woodward
K	Tim Barnwell
J	Les Cusworth
I	Nick Youngs
A	Stuart Redfern
B	Peter Wheeler
C	Steve Redfern
D	Nigel Gillingham
E	Malcolm Foulkes-Arnold
F	Steve Johnson (c)
H	Ian "Dosser" Smith
G	Dean Richards
Replacements:
P	Ian Bates for Barnwell
Q	Nick Jackson
R	Steve Kenney
S	Mike Poulson
T	Wayne Richardson
U	Chris Tressler
Coach:
Peter Rossborough
