= 1978–79 John Player Cup =

English rugby cup

Tournament statistics
- Champions: Leicester Tigers (1st title)

The 1978–79 John Player Cup was the eighth edition of England's premier rugby union club competition at the time. Leicester won the competition defeating Moseley in the final. The event was sponsored by John Player cigarettes and the final was held at Twickenham Stadium.

== Draw and results ==
=== First round ===
Team one	Team two	Score
Esher	Gosforth	3-38
Leicester	Northampton	29-3
Broughton Park	Orrell	12-9
Exeter	London Scottish	15-11
Gloucester	Richmond	3-3*
Harlequins	Plymouth Albion	21-9
Hartlepool Rovers	Walsall	13-0
Havant	Rosslyn Park	0-19
Ipswich	Matson	6-14
London Irish	Avon & Somerset Police	32-7
Wasps	Blackheath	11-0
Moseley	Liverpool	22-13
Rugby	Coventry	12-29
Wakefield	Bedford	12-27
Birkenhead Park	Sale	9-6
London Welsh	Bath	28-18

Progressed as away team*

=== Second round ===
Team one	Team two	Score
Gosforth	Harlequins	9-3
Leicester	Broughton Park	30-7
Richmond	Matson	22-3
Rosslyn Park	Exeter	7-6
Wasps	Hartlepool Rovers	10-6
Bedford	Birkenhead Park	16-8
London Irish	Moseley	0-10
London Welsh	Coventry	21-3

=== Quarter-finals ===
Team one	Team two	Score
Bedford	Leicester	12-22
Wasps	London Welsh	6-3
Gosforth	Rosslyn Park	7-3
Moseley	Richmond	27-3

=== Semi-finals ===
Team one	Team two	Score
Gosforth	Moseley	3-6
Wasps	Leicester	7-43

=== Final ===
21 April 1979

Leicester	15–12	Moseley
Try: Steve Kenney; Con: Dusty Hare; Pen: Dusty Hare 2 Drop: Dusty Hare		Try: Bob Laird; Con: Richard Akenhead; Pen: Richard Akenhead; Drop: Martin Cooper

Twickenham Stadium, London
Attendance: 18,000
Referee: Alan Welsby (Lancashire)

O	Dusty Hare
N	Mick Newton
M	Terry Burwell
L	Paul Dodge
K	Tim Barnwell
J	Les Cusworth
I	Steve Kenney
G	Garry Adey
H	Ian "Dosser" Smith
F	Steve Johnson
E	Arthur Hazelrigg
D	Nick Joyce
C	Steve Redfern
B	Peter Wheeler (c)
A	Robin Cowling
Replacements:
P	Angus Collington
Q	Brian Hall
R	Jim Kempin
S	Jez Krych
T	Tim Walley
U	John White
Coach:
Chalkie White

15	Richard Akenhead
14	Alan Thomas
13	Malcolm Swain
12	Barrie Corless
11	Bob Laird
10	Martin Cooper (c)
9	Chris Gifford
8	Derek Nutt
7	Nick Jeavons
6	Russ Field
5	Barry Ayre
4	John Beale
3	Kevin Astley
2	Gary Cox
1	Bert Greaves
Replacements:
16	Andy Watson-Jones for Corless (30m)
17	Steve King for Nutt (50m)
Coach:
