= Darren Garforth =

England international rugby union player

- Born: Darren James Garforth; 9 April 1966 (age 60) Coventry
- Height: 1.78 m (5 ft 10 in)
- Weight: 119 kg (18 st 10 lb)
- Occupation: Scaffolder

Rugby union career
- Position: Prop
Amateur team(s)
Years	Team	Apps	(Points)
–1988	Coventry Saracens		
1988–1991	Nuneaton		
Senior career
Years	Team	Apps	(Points)
1991–2003	Leicester Tigers	325	
International career
Years	Team	Apps	(Points)
1997–2000	England	25	(0)

Darren Garforth (born 9 April 1966) is a former international rugby union player who played tighthead prop for Leicester Tigers and England.

Garforth was born in Coventry, signed for Leicester Tigers and made his Leicester debut against Northampton Saints in 1991. He would go on to make over 300 appearances for the club. Wearing the C shirt, as part of the ABC club with Graham Rowntree (A) and Richard Cockerill (B). He was an important part of Tigers side which won the English league four times and the Heineken Cup twice.

Garforth made his England debut on 15 March 1997 against Wales. Garforth was eventually dropped from the England side in favour of Phil Vickery, but would continue to make some appearances, his 25th and final cap coming against Italy in 2000.

He was offered the chance to tour North America with England in 2001 but turned down the opportunity, which went to Leicester teammate Ricky Nebbett instead.

After leaving Leicester in 2003, he moved to second division Nuneaton as player-coach. Tigers signed England prop Julian White as a replacement.
