= Derek Jelley =

English rugby union player

- Born: Derek Arthur Jelley; 4 March 1972 (age 54) Nuneaton, England
- Height: 5 ft 11 in (180 cm)
- Weight: 240 lb (109 kg)
- School: Heathfield High School, Earl Shilton

Rugby union career
- Position: Prop
Senior career
Years	Team	Apps	(Points)
1993–2003	Leicester Tigers	145	(105)
2002–2003	Wakefield (loan)	23	(30)
2003	Rotherham Titans	1	(0)
1993–2003	Total	170	(135)
- Correct as of 2 March 2018

Derek Arthur Jelley (born 4 March 1972) is a former professional rugby union player who appeared 145 times for Leicester Tigers between 1993–2003, 23 times for Wakefield and once for Rotherham Titans. Jelley played both loosehead and tighthead prop.

== Career ==
=== Leicester ===
Jelley joined Leicester in 1992 at 21. His debut came on 4 April 1993 away to Rugby on the final day of the 1992-93 Courage League season. Jelley was regular understudy for Graham Rowntree with one of the two starting every game at loosehead prop between 2 September 1993 – 6 November 1996 until the emergence of Perry Freshwater forced Jelley onto the tighthead side of scrum. A shoulder injury kept Jelley out of action for four months and limited him to only three starts in Tigers 1997–98, however the following campaign was his best with a club-leading 35 appearances in the 1998–99 season, including 20 starts, as Leicester won the Premiership that season. Jelley's appearances became more limited as Freshwater was preferred as reserve loosehead and Ricky Nebbett was signed to cover tighthead. His final Leicester appearance was on 23 January 2003 at Welford Road in the Heineken Cup against Neath.

=== Wakefield and Rotherham ===
Jelley joined Wakefield on loan for the 2002–03 National Division One season. After making his debut on 31 August 2002 against Exeter Chiefs he made 23 appearances for the Yorkshire club that season. He joined Rotherham in the summer of 2003 following their promotion to the Premiership but suffered a career ending shoulder injury in his only game for the club.
