= Rob Hawkins =

English rugby union player

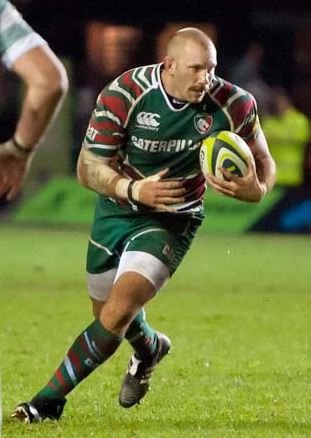
- Born: Robert Hawkins; 14 April 1983 (age 43) Taunton, Somerset, England
- Height: 1.83 m (6 ft 0 in)
- Weight: 107 kg (16 st 12 lb)

Rugby union career
- Position: Hooker
Senior career
Years	Team	Apps	(Points)
2003–2010	Bath Rugby	58	(15)
2010–2014	Leicester Tigers	67	(15)
2014–2016	Newcastle Falcons	7	(0)
2016-2017	Bristol Rugby	14	(10)

Rob Hawkins (born 14 April 1983) is a rugby union player who last played for Bristol Rugby in Premiership Rugby. Hawkins has previously played for Leicester Tigers, Bath and Newcastle Falcons.

== Career ==
Hawkins' position of choice is as a hooker. Hawkins represented England at Under 21 level.

Hawkins made his Bath Rugby debut in a European Challenge Cup match against L'Aquila Rugby. He made his League debut against Sale Sharks.

Hawkins joined Leicester Tigers for the 2010/2011 season.

In 2012 Calum Clark of Northampton Saints was suspended for 32 weeks after being found guilty of deliberately breaking the arm of Hawkins in the 2012 LV cup final.

Hawkins played as a replacement during the 2013 Premiership final as Leicester defeated Northampton Saints.

On 14 April 2014, Hawkins signed for Newcastle Falcons on a two-year deal ahead of the 2014–15 season.
