= James Grindal =

English rugby union player

- Born: James Grindal; 18 August 1980 (age 46) Nuneaton, England
- Height: 1.75 m (5 ft 9 in)
- Weight: 85 kg (13 st 5 lb)
- School: King Henry VIII School, Coventry
- University: Loughborough University

Rugby union career
- Position: Scrum-half
- Current team: Bristol Rugby
Youth career
- Nuneaton
1999–2002	Leicester Tigers		
2002–2009	Newcastle Falcons		
2009–2012	Leicester Tigers		
2012–2014	Bristol Rugby		
International career
Years	Team	Apps	(Points)
- England under 18
–	England under 21		
–	England Saxons		

James Grindal (born 1980 in Nuneaton) is an English former rugby union player who played scrum-half for Bristol Rugby. He made over 275 first class appearances, and was capped by England at Under-18, Under-21 and England Saxons level, as well as representing the Barbarians.

A former pupil of King Henry VIII School in Coventry, scrum-half Grindal made his first-team debut for Leicester Tigers as a 19-year-old and, between 1999 and 2002 made 27 appearances, and was involved in the first-team squad during three Premiership title wins and the back to back Heineken Cup wins in 2000 and 2001, in a golden era for the club.

Grindal made a move to Newcastle Falcons, under Director of Rugby Rob Andrew, in the summer of 2002. He made 156 first-team appearances for Newcastle between 2002 and 2009, and won the Powergen Cup after victory over Sale Sharks at Twickenham in 2004. Grindal was partnered at half back with World Cup winner Jonny Wilkinson, during his time there.

He was called into the England Saxons side that defeated Ireland A on 1 February 2008.

On 25 June 2009 it was confirmed that he would return to his former club, Leicester Tigers, from the Newcastle Falcons to replace the departing Julien Dupuy. In his second spell as a Leicester Tigers player, Grindal was in the matchday squad for 2 Twickenham Premiership Finals in 2010 and 2011, picking up an Aviva Premiership winner's medal as a replacement in 2010. He made a further 59 appearances for the first team in these 3 seasons.

He joined Bristol for the 2012–13 season, and was Club Captain for the 2013–14 season, making 43 appearances in his 2 seasons there. Grindal retired from professional rugby at the end of the 2013–14 season.
