= Steve Hackney =

English rugby union player

- Born: Stephen Thomas Hackney; 13 June 1968 (age 58) Stockton-on-Tees, County Durham, England
- Height: 5 ft 11 in (180 cm)
- Weight: 192 lb (87 kg)
- School: Stockton VI Form
- University: Loughborough University

Rugby union career
- Position: Wing
Senior career
Years	Team	Apps	(Points)
1988–1991	Nottingham	67	(108)
1991–1997	Leicester Tigers	152	(404)
1997	Moseley	5	(5)
1998–1999	Waterloo	23	(25)
1988–1999	Total	247	(542)
International career
Years	Team	Apps	(Points)
1993	England A		

Stephen Thomas Hackney (born 13 June 1968) is an English former rugby union player. A wing he played in England's top division of domestic rugby union for Nottingham and Leicester Tigers, and also played in the second division for Moseley and Waterloo.

He played for England A in 1993, scoring four tries in a match against Spain and played for England 7s in the 1995 Hong Kong Sevens tournament. He started in the 1997 Heineken Cup Final for Leicester Tigers.

== Career ==
Hackney joined Nottingham in 1988 after developing a good reputation in university rugby playing for Loughborough Students. He played three seasons in England's top division before moving to fellow midlands side Leicester.

Hackney made his Leicester debut on 14 August 1991 against Edmonton during the club's 1991 pre-season tour to Canada. A productive first season saw Hackney top try scorer with 18 tries in 23 appearances, despite competition from Rory Underwood (England's record scorer) and his brother Tony Underwood. Hackney was top try scorer again in the 1992–93 season with 14 tries in 18 games, though the Underwood brothers were preferred for the 1993 Pilkington Cup Final, and again in the 1994–95 season with 8 tries in 16 games. He played in 11 of 18 league games, scoring 5 tries as Leicester won the 1994-95 Courage League title.

In 1995-96 Hackney played 33 of 37 games for Leicester, the most of any player that season, and was again top try scorer with 18. He played in his first Twickenham cup final as Leicester lost the 1996 Pilkington Cup Final to Bath, 16–15. During the 1996–97 season Leicester participated in the Heineken Cup, a European competition, for the first time. Hackney scored against the Scottish Borders in pool play and then opened the scoring in the semi-final with a 7th minute try against Stade Toulousain. He started in the 1997 Heineken Cup Final against CA Brive, though Tigers lost 28–9. Hackney played 36 of 46 games during the season, the most of any player, and scored 15 tries second only to Rory Underwood. Despite his regular appearances and scoring record his final Tigers appearance was on 26 April 1997 in a 13–12 defeat to Harlequins at Welford Road.

He moved to Moseley in the second division (styled Premiership 2 that season) for the 1997–98 season but featured in only 5 games before moving mid-season to fellow second division side Waterloo for the remained of the season and the following campaign.

== Sources ==
- Farmer, Stuart; Hands, David (2014). Tigers - Official history of Leicester Football Club. The Rugby Development Foundation. ISBN 978-0-9930213-0-5.
