= James Buckland =

- Born: James Buckland; 21 September 1981 (age 45) Aylesbury, England
- Height: 1.80 m (5 ft 11 in)
- Weight: 105 kg (16 st 7 lb)

Rugby union career
- Position: Hooker
Youth career
- 2000–2003: Northampton Academy
- 2004–2005: Tawa
Senior career
Years	Team	Apps	(Points)
2000–2002	Northampton	0	(0)
2002–2007	Leicester Tigers	69	(15)
2007–2008	London Wasps	9	(5)
2008–2011	London Irish	3	(0)
International career
Years	Team	Apps	(Points)
2002	England U21		
2006	England Saxons		

James Buckland (born 21 September 1981 in Aylesbury, England) is a former rugby union player and current coach who played at hooker for Leicester Tigers, London Wasps, London Irish in the Aviva Premiership.

Born and raised in Aylesbury, Buckland started playing at Aylesbury RFC. Whilst playing for his home town club, he was spotted and offered a contract with the Northampton Saints. He did not make an appearance for their senior team and later signed with the Leicester Tigers during the summer of 2002.

That same summer, Buckland represented England at the 2002 IRB U21 World Championships.

During his spell with the Tigers, Buckland featured in the 2007 Heineken Cup Final. He also played as a replacement when Leicester won that year's Premiership final. He also represented the England Saxons at the 2006 Churchill Cup.

Buckland joined London Wasps for the 2007–08 season. Buckland signed for London Irish in the summer of 2008. James Buckland retired from the game due to injury and became the forwards coach at Championship rugby club London Scottish from 2011/12 season.

In the summer of 2015 he became head coach at National One side Rosslyn Park on a 3-year contract.
