= Stuart Potter =

England international rugby union player

- Born: Stuart Potter; 11 November 1967 (age 59) Lichfield, Staffordshire
- Height: 5 ft 11 in (1.80 m)
- Weight: 203 lb (92 kg)
- School: Lichfield Friary Grange
- Occupation: Insurance Broker

Rugby union career
Youth career
- ????: Lichfield
Senior career
Years	Team	Apps	(Points)
1988–1992	Nottingham	86	(92)
1992–1999	Leicester Tigers	169	(180)
1988–1999	Total	255	(272)
International career
Years	Team	Apps	(Points)
1998	England	1	(0)
1993–??	England A	15	(??)

Stuart Potter (born 11 November 1967 in Lichfield) is a retired rugby union centre who played for Nottingham, Leicester Tigers and England. Potter won both the league and cup with Leicester.

== Career ==
Potter started his career with a four-year spell with Nottingham from 1988–92, twice being named the club's player of the season. Nottingham were relegated after the 1991–92 Courage League season and so Potter moved south to Leicester Tigers.

Potter made his Leicester Tigers debut on 1 September 1992 at Sheffield. His next match was against an England XV, playing Leicester to mark 100 years of rugby at Welford Road. Potter's form saw him named in the Midland's side which lost 32-9 to South Africa on their 1992 tour. Potter played in all five rounds as Leicester won the 1992-93 Pilkington Cup, Potter scored in the quarter-final win over Exeter and a fine try against Harlequins in the final.

Potter was called up to the 1993 England rugby union tour of Canada and played in the first international against Canada but caps were not awarded by England on this tour. Potter was also called up to the 1994 tour to South Africa as an injury replacement for Jerry Guscott but again did not feature in a capped international.

In the 1993–94 season Leicester finished runners up to Bath in both the league & cup; Potter played in 16 of the 18 league games and in all five cup games, scoring in the semi-final win over Orrell. Potter was a crucial part of Leicester's 1995 league title win, again featuring in 16 league games.

Potter featured in a losing cup final in 1996 (again to Bath); in the 1996–97 season Potter formed a good partnership with Will Greenwood and was part of the Leicester side which made the 1997 Heineken Cup Final against CA Brive, losing 28-9, before winning another domestic cup beating Sale 9-3 to win the 1996-97 Pilkington Cup.

His sole England cap came as a 2-minute blood replacement during the 76-0 hammering by Australia on the 1998 "Tour to Hell", however this hides the fact that he was an England A stalwart, gaining 15 caps, his international ambitions being limited because he shared a position with captain Will Carling, as well as players such as Jerry Guscott and Phil de Glanville. He had also been called into the England squad for the 1998 Six Nations championship but was injured.

Potter played in 11 games as Leicester won the 1999 Premiership but towards the end of the season fell out of favour behind Craig Joiner. He featured only 5 times in the 1999–2000 league season where Leicester retained their title. His final match for the club was against Harlequins on 29 December 1999.

Now retired from playing he now is living in Lichfield with his family.

== Sources ==
- Farmer, Stuart; Hands, David (2014). Tigers - Official history of Leicester Football Club. The Rugby Development Foundation. ISBN 978-0-9930213-0-5.
