= John Hart (rugby union, born 1982) =

English rugby union player

- Born: John Hart; 20 March 1982 (age 44) Wimbledon, England
- Height: 1.96 m (6 ft 5 in)
- Weight: 110 kg (17 st 5 lb)
- School: Brighton College

Rugby union career
- Position: Number Eight
- Current team: London Wasps
Youth career
- 2000–2003: Wasps Academy
Senior career
Years	Team	Apps	(Points)
2002–2012	London Wasps	115	(20)

John Hart (born 20 March 1982 in Wimbledon, England) is a retired rugby union player for London Wasps in the Aviva Premiership. His position of choice is at number eight. Hart has been captain 38 times. He came through the Wasps Academy, making his senior debut (replacement v Sale) in November 2002. In his time at the club, he played in two winning Premiership Finals in 2005 and 2008 and played a key role in the squads that won two Heineken Cup titles. Hart, who has made 165 appearances for the Wasps, retired in April 2012 for medical reasons.
