= Steve Redfern =

England international rugby union, league player, RU coach & administrator

- Born: Stephen Paul Redfern; 26 October 1963 (age 63) Leicester, England
- Height: 6 ft 3 in (1.91 m)
- Weight: 19 st (120 kg)
- School: Markfield High School
- Notable relative: Stuart Redfern

Rugby union career
- Position: Prop
Senior career
Years	Team	Apps	(Points)
1976-1984	Leicester Tigers	241	(64)
International career
Years	Team	Apps	(Points)
1984	England	1	(0)
- Rugby league career

Playing information
- Position: Prop
Club
Years	Team	Pld	T	G	FG	P
1985–1987	Sheffield Eagles	9

Stephen Paul Redfern (born 26 October 1963) is an English former rugby union and professional rugby league player in the 1970s and 1980s. He played one test for England in 1984, and between 1976 and 1984 played club rugby for Leicester Tigers. His position was tighthead prop. He then played professional rugby league for Sheffield Eagles, but injury limited him to only 9 appearance.

== Early years ==
Redfern was born in Leicester, England. He attended Markfield High School and Coalville Grammar School. Redfern played his junior rugby for Coalville.

== Career ==
Redfern joined Leicester Tigers from school, and played for the youth team from 1973. He made his Leicester début on 30 October 1976 against Nottingham. Redfern made an immediate impact starting 20 games in his first season and was selected for the England under 23s team that toured Canada at the end of the 1976/77 season. Redfern played 36 games in the 77–78 season culminating in a John Player Cup Final loss to Gloucester.

A neck injury limited Redfern to only 7 appearances in 1978–79, but he returned in time to feature in Leicester's first national cup win, a 15-12 win over Moseley & played for the Midlands Rugby team against the All Blacks that season. He also started the winning finals in 1980 against London Irish and 1981 against Gosforth; as well as another losing final in 1984 against Bristol. In 1981 Redfern started as the Midlands beat Australia at Welford Road.

Redfern made his full England début on 14 February 1984 as a replacement in a 12–9 win against Ireland at Twickenham. Although he played for England 'B' on many occasions and was named as a replacement on other occasions this was his only international cap.

Redfern played tighthead prop, so wore the letter C shirt as part of the Leicester front row along with the Leicester & England captain Peter Wheeler at hooker, and England-international Robin Cowling at loosehead. He also played 45 games with his brother Stuart who replaced Cowling at prop when he retired.

He made 247 appearances for the club, with 237 coming in the C shirt, a club record.

== Rugby League ==
Redfern turned professional, joining rugby league side Sheffield Eagles in 1984. He made his debut against Doncaster in December 1984 but his career was cut short by injury, and after 9 games Redfern retired from the game.

He did go on to play Amateur Rugby League for Leicester RLFC, playing prop for several seasons circa 1988.

== Coaching record ==
Redfern spent several years fighting with the RFU to be reinstated to rugby union. Redfern was allowed to come back to rugby union as a coach, starting with the local Leicestershire team Wigston. He later coached the Swedish club Pingvin in 1990/92 and led them to a win in the Swedish Championships.

He returned from Sweden in 1993 to take over Nuneaton. While at Nuneaton he became involved in coaching the west Midlands women's team, then moving on to the Midlands team. His success with them led to a position with the national set up, at first working with the England A team, and then the senior squad. Redfern worked with the team through the six national and European championships.

In 1993, while still working in the women's game, Redfern moved back to his first junior club, Coalville in Leicestershire, as head of rugby.

In 2006 Redfern left Coalville and worked with the Sheffield club before returning to Leicestershire to spend time working as an adviser to several clubs, including the Leicestershire under 18 squad.

In 2007 he went to Italian club Rugby Feltre as director of rugby.

In 2009 Redfern was voted onto the Leicester Tigers walk of legends.

In 2009, after the promotion of Asd Rugby Feltre, he moved to Berliner Rugby Club as director of rugby.

== Later life ==
Redfern has been managing his company Majorca Beach Rugby which is a rugby tournament held over the first May bank holiday. Redfern has been appointed as the forwards coach for Dudley Kingswinford which plays in the sixth tier of English club rugby, participating in Midlands 1 West.
