= Richard Harding (rugby union) =

English rugby union player (born 1953)

- Born: Richard Mark Harding; 29 August 1953 (age 73) Bristol
- School: Millfield School
- University: Cambridge University
- Occupation(s): Estate Agent and Chartered Surveyor (FRICS)

Rugby union career
- Position: Scrum-half
Senior career
Years	Team	Apps	(Points)
- Cambridge University RUFC
–	Bristol RFC		
International career
Years	Team	Apps	(Points)
1985-1988	England	12	(4)

Richard Mark Harding (born 29 August 1953) is a former rugby union international who played for England, and on his last test captained them. He also played club rugby for his home city of Bristol and was part of Bristol RFC's cup winning side of 1983. After his sporting career he has concentrated on his profession as an estate agent and chartered surveyor.

== Early life ==
Richard Harding was born in Bristol. He attended Millfield School from 1968 to 1971, where he became head of house at Shapwick Manor; his nickname there was "Gilbert". He went on to study Land Economy at St John's College, Cambridge, graduating with a BA in the subject in 1975.

== Rugby career ==
Richard Harding played rugby union at school and whilst at Cambridge University earned a Blue. He went on to play for Bristol RFC and was a stalwart of the team during the 1980s where he was also known by the nickname "Corky". He was particularly known for his extremely long pass which was used to great effect by Bristol. Harding would pass from a scrum straight to the full back which was intended to leave the opposing fullback flat-footed, allowing a two on one with the opposing wing. Whilst at Bristol he was part of the side who won the 1982–83 John Player Cup Final at Twickenham

Harding's first cap for England came on Saturday, 5 January 1985 when England played Romania at Twickenham. The match was won by England 22–15. After that match, the position of scrum-half was contested by Harding, Richard Hill and Nigel Melville. Harding gained two more caps in 1985 against France and Scotland at Twickenham both in the Five Nations. In the France game Harding is remembered for his tackle on Patrick Esteve when he knocked the ball out of his hands over the try line. In 1986 he was not capped but returned to the team in 1987 when he was picked to replace the dropped Richard Hill following disciplinary action against the latter following the 1984 England-Wales match in Cardiff on 7 March. Harding played in the final Five Nations match against Scotland and found himself as first choice for the first Rugby World Cup in 1987. He played three of England's four games, (being rested against the USA) but was replaced in the 1988 Five Nations by Melville. He came on as a substitute in the Ireland game, and was picked for the end of season game against Ireland, which was played to celebrate the centenary of Dublin. The 1988 tour of Australia and Fiji saw two scrum-halves included, and Harding was one of them. Harding played in both Australian tests which both ended in defeat. The final test of the tour was to be the first ever test against Fiji. Harding was honoured by being selected as the captain, and England were victorious, 25–10. Harding was the fourth player from Bristol RFC to have been made captain of England. However he soon found himself relegated to third choice scrum-half, behind Hill (making a comeback to the side) and Dewi Morris, who made his debut in the home match against Australia in 1988, and Harding could not force his way back into the England reckoning again.

== England Games ==
1985 Friendly v Romania (Twickenham)

1985 Five Nations Championship v France (Twickenham) v Scotland (Twickenham)

1987 Five Nations Championship v Scotland (Twickenham)

1987 World Cup

v Australia (Sydney) v Japan (Sydney) v Wales (Brisbane)

1988 Five Nations Championship

v Ireland (R) (Twickenham)

1988 Millennium Match

v Ireland (Dublin)

1988 Tour Australia & Fiji

v Australia (Brisbane) v Australia (Sydney) v Fiji (c) (Suva)

== Outside Rugby ==
Harding's background in Land Economy led him to become a Chartered Surveyor and he opened up Richard Harding Estate Agents. This firm operates from a high-profile office in Clifton, Bristol and specialises in the sale of residential property. It was at one point sold to Humberts for a maximum total consideration of £2,543,000 of which £1.43million was paid in cash and £600,000 in Humberts shares with the balance representing deferred consideration and acquisition costs. However, was bought back by Harding in 2008 just nine months after selling it for £1.06 million, of which £60,000 was paid in cash and the balance representing the cancellation of the outstanding deferred amount of £1.0 million.

== Personal life ==
Richard Harding has a wife, Angela, who partners him in his business and together they have two children.

Sporting positions
Preceded by John Orwin	English National Rugby Union Captain; Jun 1988	Succeeded by Will Carling
