= Boris Stankovich =

NZ rugby union player

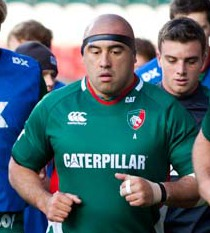
- Born: Boris Stankovich; 9 January 1980 (age 46) Auckland, New Zealand
- Height: 1.83 m (6 ft 0 in)
- Weight: 115 kg (18 st 2 lb)
- School: Kelston Boys High School

Rugby union career
- Position: Loosehead prop
Senior career
Years	Team	Apps	(Points)
1999–2000	London Irish	6	(0)
2000–2005	SC Graulhet		
2004–2007	SC Albi	46	(0)
2007–2014	Leicester Tigers	119	(15)
2014–2016	NG Dragons	37	(0)
2016	Coventry RFC		
International career
Years	Team	Apps	(Points)
- England U19
–	England U21		
Coaching career
- Years: Team
- 2016-: Coventry RFC
- 2017-2020: Leicester Tigers
- 2019: Canada Rugby World Cup
- 2021: Russia

Boris Stankovich (born 9 January 1980, in New Zealand), is a rugby union coach and former player who played for Leicester Tigers and Newport Gwent Dragons. He was most recently the scrum coach at Leicester where he spent the most of his career.

While born in New Zealand, Stankovich was capped for England at under-19 and under-21 level.

== Early career ==
Stankovich was educated at Kelston Boys High School, Auckland and played Rugby for the school's First XV alongside Peter Koloi and Vinnie "Kelston Smashing Machine" McClafferty . He was also Head boy in his final year at school. He began his career playing for London Irish before moving to France where he won promotion with SC Albi to the Top 14 in 2006. Initially he played at hooker before moving to prop.

== Leicester Tigers ==
He moved to Leicester Tigers in 2007 and made his debut against Bristol in the first match of the 2007/08 season. During his time at Leicester, the club have won three Premiership titles and the Anglo-Welsh Cup in 2012, though he only featured in one of the victorious Premiership finals (2010).

Stankovich returned to the club as an interim scrum coach for the 2016/2017 season, following the departure of Richard Cockerill from the Director of Rugby role. He became the permanent scrum coach soon after and stayed until leaving in October 2020.

== Newport Gwent Dragons ==
In May 2014 Stankovich joined Newport Gwent Dragons. He was released in 2016.
