= Aadel Kardooni =

Iranian rugby union player

- Born: Aadel Kardooni; 17 May 1968 (age 58) Tehran, Iran
- Height: 5 ft 8 in (1.73 m)
- Weight: 12 st 2 lb (76 kg)
- School: Clayesmore School; Sherborne School
- University: De Montfort University
- Occupation: Futures broker

Rugby union career
- Position: Scrum-half
Amateur team(s)
Years	Team	Apps	(Points)
- North Dorset RFC
2002–2003	Rugby Lions	5	(0)
Senior career
Years	Team	Apps	(Points)
1987–1988	Wasps		
1988–1997	Leicester Tigers	222	(302)
1997–1998	Bedford Blues	16	(0)
1998–1999	Blackheath F.C.	10	(5)
- Correct as of 21 September 2009
International career
Years	Team	Apps	(Points)
1992	England A	2	
- Correct as of 21 September 2009

Aadel Kardooni (Persian: عادل کردونی, born 17 May 1968 in Tehran) is a British-Iranian former professional rugby union player.

He is the first Iranian rugby union player to ever play professionally.

== Playing career ==
Iranian born Aadel left his homeland at the age of 8 to attend boarding school in Dorset, England. At Sherborne School Kardooni was coached by former England coach Mike Davis. Kardooni played for Wasps and Middlesex before joining Leicester Tigers in 1988. Kardooni made his Leicester debut away to Swansea.

A very agile scrum half with a bullet pass, Kardooni was a regular in the Midlands and England A squads but a full cap eluded him throughout his career. Kardooni could always be relied on throughout the early to mid-nineties but struggled when the game became professional, and slipped down the pecking order behind Austin Healey and Jamie Hamilton. His last appearance in a Tigers shirt was as a late substitution in the Pilkington Cup final triumph over Sale in 1997.

Kardooni moved on to Bedford Blues as he preferred to stay in his career rather than go full-time professional at the age of 29.
