= Alfred Hind =

English cricketer and England international rugby union player

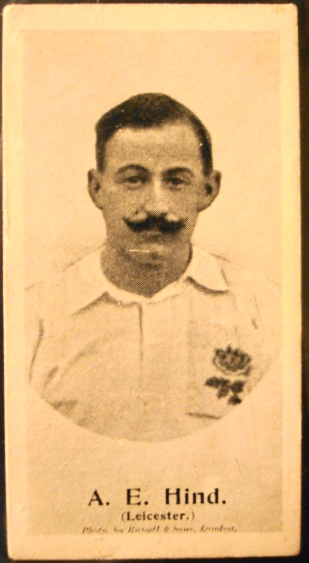

Personal information
- Full name: Alfred Ernest Hind
- Born: 7 April 1878; Preston, Lancashire, England
- Died: 21 March 1947 (aged 68); Oadby, Leicestershire, England
- Batting: Right-handed
- Bowling: Right-arm medium
- Role: Bowler

Domestic team information
- Years: Team
- 1898–1901: Cambridge University
- 1901: Nottinghamshire

Career statistics
Competition	First-class
Matches	37
Runs scored	681
Batting average	14.18
100s/50s	0/3
Top score	54*
Balls bowled	5,494
Wickets	80
Bowling average	26.85
5 wickets in innings	3
10 wickets in match	0
Best bowling	7/30
Catches/stumpings	37/–
- Source: CricketArchive, 8 October 2022

Rugby union career
Senior career
Years	Team	Apps	(Points)
- Cambridge University
1899–1906	Leicester Tigers	127	(261)
1902–1908	Nottingham	43	(126)
International career
Years	Team	Apps	(Points)
1903	British Isles	0	(0)
1905–1906	England	2	(0)

Alfred Ernest Hind (7 April 1878 – 21 March 1947) was an English sportsman who played first-class cricket for Cambridge University and represented England at rugby union.

== Personal history ==
Hind was born in Preston, Lancashire in 1878. He was educated at Uppingham School before entering Trinity Hall, Cambridge in 1897. He gained four sporting Blues in athletics between 1898 and 1901 and ran the 100 yards in 9.8 seconds on two occasions. He gained a further Blue with the rugby team in 1900. On leaving university he became a solicitor.

== Cricket career ==
A right arm medium pace bowler and handy lower order batsman, Hind played most of his cricket for Cambridge but also appeared in a first-class match for Nottinghamshire. That match came in the 1901 County Championship, against Leicestershire at Aylestone Road, but in a low scoring encounter but wasn't called on to bowl by his captain Arthur Jones. The previous year he had played a three-day match for Nottinghamshire against the touring West Indians and made what would have been his highest score of 60 except the match wasn't awarded first-class status.

Hind's first year at Cambridge University Cricket Club was his best, claiming 35 wickets at 17.91 in 1898. He took his career best figures of 7 for 30 on debut, in a University Match against CI Thornton's England XI and despite him taking a further two wickets in the second innings they still lost the match. Perhaps the biggest name out of his 80 first-class victims was the great W.G. Grace, whom Hind dismissed when the England Test cricketer was playing for the Marylebone Cricket Club in 1900.

== Rugby career ==
Hind had a long and distinguished rugby career, first representing Cambridge University while a student. He played in the Varsity Match of 1900 and on leaving he joined Leicester full time having made his Tigers debut on 7 October 1899 against Exeter. Hind played 127 times for Leicester between 1899 and 1906. He played in 5 consecutive Midland Counties Cup finals, scoring a hat trick in the 1905 final against Nottingham.

The high point of his career came in the 1905–1906 season when he faced The Original All Blacks three times in 6 weeks, first for Leicester, then Midlands Counties before making his England debut against them on 2 December 1905.

His other cap came the same season when he played against Wales in a Home Nations encounter. In 1903 he toured South Africa with the British Isles. He also played club rugby at Nottingham, mostly as a winger, playing 43 times for the club between 1902 and 1908.
