= John Duggan (rugby union, born 1948) =

Irish rugby union player

- Born: Michael John Duggan; 5 June 1948 (age 78) Dublin, Ireland
- School: Oakham School
- Occupation: Teacher

Rugby union career
- Position: Wing
Senior career
Years	Team	Apps	(Points)
1970–1980	Leicester Tigers	302	(608)

Michael John Duggan known as John Duggan (born 5 June 1948 in Dublin, Ireland) is a retired rugby union wing who played 302 games for Leicester Tigers from 1970 to 1980.

Duggan made his Leicester debut as a 21 year old on 3 January 1970 against Bath playing 13 times in his first season. In 1971 as rugby union's point system changed Duggan scored Leicester's last three point try and then their first four-point try. Duggan played for the Midlands against the All Blacks but turned down an England trial as he was Irish qualified and in 1975 played for the Irish Wolfhounds but was never selected internationally. Duggan has played more matches on the wing for Leicester than any other player and finished with 158 tries for Leicester, one of only 4 players to score more than 150 tries for the club.

Duggan was a teacher at Southfields College, when rugby became professional became Leicester's condition coach between 1997–2004. Following the departure of Dean Richards as director of rugby he left the club and returned to teaching at Lancaster Boys School in the city. In 2011 Duggan received an award from Aviva and The Daily Telegraph for his contribution to school sport.

== Sources ==
Farmer, Stuart & Hands, David Tigers-Official History of Leicester Football Club (The Rugby DevelopmentFoundation ISBN 978-0-9930213-0-5)
