= Hugh Condon =

Irish rugby union player (born 1955)

- Full name: Hugh Charles Condon
- Born: 17 February 1955 (age 71) Leamington Spa, England

Rugby union career
- Position: Fly-half
International career
Years	Team	Apps	(Points)
1984	Ireland	1	(0)

Hugh Charles Condon (born 17 February 1955) is an Irish former rugby union international.

Born to Irish parents in Leamington Spa, Condon was a fly-half who represented English Colts and played for London Irish while studying medicine. He was a Munster provincial player and earned an Ireland call up in the 1984 Five Nations, coming on off the bench against Scotland at Lansdowne Road to gain his only international cap.

== See also ==
- List of Ireland national rugby union players
