= Robin Cowling =

English rugby union player and coach (1944–2026)

- Born: Robin James Cowling; 24 March 1944 Ipswich, England
- Died: August 2026 (aged 82)
- School: Sidcot School (Weston-Super-Mare)
- University: Royal Agricultural College (Cirencester)
- Notable relative: John A'Bear (uncle)
- Occupation: Farmer

Rugby union career
- Position: Prop
Senior career
Years	Team	Apps	(Points)
1967–1974	Gloucester	216	
1974–1981	Leicester Tigers	184	(32)
International career
Years	Team	Apps	(Points)
1977–1979	England	8	(0)

Robin James Cowling (24 March 1944 – August 2026) was an English rugby union player. He won 8 caps for England between 1977 and 1979, and played 216 games for Gloucester Rugby between 1967 and 1974 before playing 184 times for Leicester Tigers between 1974 and his retirement in 1981.

== Early life ==
Cowling was born in Ipswich, Suffolk, but moved to the South West as a small baby. His mother was from Gloucester, his grandfather was a former captain of Gloucester Rugby, and his uncle was John A'Bear, who toured with the British Lions in 1936.

== Career ==
Cowling made his Gloucester debut on 21 October 1967, as a hooker, against Newport. He quickly switched to his henceforth regular position of loosehead prop and was a regular in the side from December 1967. In 1972, Cowling started the inaugural RFU Knockout Cup Final where Gloucester beat Moseley, and the County Championship Final where Gloucestershire won their first title since 1937. In the 1972–73 season Cowling featured in a remarkable 50 first class games, playing 45 times for Gloucester plus representative matches for Gloucestershire in the County Championship and for the combined Western Counties in their tour game against New Zealand.

He moved to Market Harborough in 1974 to take a post as farm manager and joined Leicester Tigers, making his Tigers debut on 7 September_{,}1974 against Bedford. He was England reserve prop throughout the following season and went on to win eight England caps with Leicester between 1977 and 1979. He didn't play in the John Player Cup Final against Gloucester in 1978 due to a shoulder injury sustained playing for England, but started in Leicester's three successive Cup Final wins, against Moseley in 1979, London Irish in 1980 and in his final game the 1981 Final against Gosforth. He also played for the Barbarians.

Cowling was on the Exeter Chiefs coaching staff from 1997 until his death in 2026, apart from two years with Cornish Pirates. When Don Rutherford was Rugby Football Union Technical Director, he asked Cowling to run a pilot academy scheme in the South West making him involved in academy rugby from the outset of the professional game. As team manager and talent scout, he contributed substantially to the Exeter Chiefs' current success.

== Death ==
Cowling's death was announced on 3 August 2026. He was 82.
