= Garry Adey =

England international rugby union footballer (1945–2033)

- Born: Garry John Adey; 13 June 1945 Loughborough, Leicestershire, England
- Died: 17 August 2023 (aged 78) Norfolk, England
- School: Humphrey Perkins School
- Occupation: Company Director

Rugby union career
- Position: Number 8
Senior career
Years	Team	Apps	(Points)
1967–81	Leicester Tigers	381	(215)
International career
Years	Team	Apps	(Points)
1976	England	2	(0)

Garry John Adey (13 June 1945 – 17 August 2023) was an English rugby union Number 8 for Leicester Tigers and England. Adey made 381 appearances for Leicester between 1965–81. He played twice for England in 1976. Adey was a member of a very successful Leicester side which won the John Player Cup 3 times in consecutive years from 1979–81. Adey was Executive Chairman of The Adey Group which has been established for over 90 years, in the steel fabrication and steel stockholding business.

== Playing career ==
Born in Loughborough, Leicestershire on 13 June 1945, Adey made his debut for Leicester Tigers on Wednesday 8 March 1967 in a 14–6 win against Loughborough Colleges at Welford Road. Adey was used sparingly at lock for the rest of the season and the following two seasons featuring only 28 times across all three seasons. Adey moved to number 8 in 1969 scoring tries in wins over Fylde and Moseley, by the end of the season he was firmly established as Leicester's premier number 8 having played 20 of the last 26 games.

Adey won his two international caps for England in the 1976. He made his debut on 6 March 1976 against Ireland at Twickenham, and played the final round against France. England were whitewashed in the competition and finished bottom.

Adey played every game as Leicester went to the 1977–78 John Player Cup final, the first national final in the club's history, where they lost 6–3 to Gloucester. Adey was again a cup ever present in 1979, scoring tries in the first round win against Northampton Saints and the second round win against Broughton Park. Adey started the final as Tigers won their first national cup, a 15–12 win against Moseley. Adey missed the semi-final in 1980 but returned for a third cup final appearance in a row in the 1980 final, a 21–9 win against London Irish.

After the 1980 final, to celebrate Leicester's centenary Adey was part of a tour to Australia and Fiji, playing against Queensland Reds and against a Fijian Chairman's XV. In November 1980 Adey announced his retirement after an ankle injury suffered against Cambridge University but returned after injuries to others to play the final three games of the season, including a fourth successive final and third win, this time over Gosforth (22–15).

== Death ==
Adey died in August 2023, at the age of 78.

== Sources ==
- Farmer, Stuart; Hands, David (2014). Tigers – Official history of Leicester Football Club. The Rugby Development Foundation. ISBN 978-0-9930213-0-5.
