= Barry Evans (rugby union) =

England international rugby union player

- Born: Barry John Evans; 10 October 1962 (age 64) Hinckley, Leicestershire, England
- School: John Cleveland College

Rugby union career
- Position: Wing
Senior career
| Years | Team | Apps | (Points) |
| 1981–1991 | Leicester Tigers | 266 | (678) |
| 1991–1994 | Coventry | | |
| 1994–1995 | Leicester Tigers | 7 | (5) |
International career
| Years | Team | Apps | (Points) |
| 1988 | England | 2 | |

Barry John Evans (born 10 October 1962) is a retired English rugby union wing who played for Leicester Tigers and England. He was born in Hinckley and educated at John Cleveland College. He won 2 England caps in 1988 against Australia and Fiji on the 1988 England rugby union tour of Australia and Fiji. During his club career, he scored 170 tries for Leicester.

Evans played for England at under 16s, Schools, under 19s and for England Students, he made his Leicester debut on 31 October 1981 in a 34–14 win against Saracens, and he became Leicester's top post-World War 2 try scorer passing 150 tries against Gosforth in 1989. He went on to captain Coventry after leaving Leicester in 1991, before returning to Leicester for a final season in 1994–1995.

He also played for Worcester Warriors and local clubs Hinckley and Market Bosworth.

== Sources ==
- Farmer, Stuart; Hands, David (2014). Tigers – Official history of Leicester Football Club. The Rugby Development Foundation. ISBN 978-0-9930213-0-5.
