= Ricky Nebbett =

English rugby union player

- Born: 16 August 1977 (age 49) Kingston upon Thames, England
- Height: 1.80 m (5 ft 11 in)
- Weight: 120 kg (18 st 13 lb)
- School: John Fisher
- University: Brunel/Buckingham
- Occupation: Teacher of PE/Head of Rugby

Rugby union career
- Position: Prop
Senior career
Years	Team	Apps	(Points)
1997–2000	Harlequin F.C.		
2000–2004	Leicester Tigers	150	(0)
2004–2005	Leinster Rugby		
2005–2008	Harlequin F.C.		
–	Esher		
International career
Years	Team	Apps	(Points)
	England A	4	

Ricky Nebbett (born 16 August 1977) is a former professional Rugby Union player whose career spanned 16 years.

Nebbett's position of choice was tight headprop. He was a part of the Leicester squad that won three league titles and two Heineken cups notably the 2001 Heineken Cup Final.

Nebbett was called up to the senior England squad for the 2001 tour of North America.

Nebbett played and coached Esher for a number of seasons and was their director of Rugby until 2018/19.
