= Chalkie White (rugby union) =

English rugby union player

- Born: Herbert Victor White; 16 January 1929 Carlisle, England
- Died: 24 January 2005 (aged 76) Taunton, Somerset, England
- University: Borough Road College, Isleworth, where he undertook a 4-year specialist course in Physical Education

Rugby union career
- Position: scrum-half
Amateur team(s)
Years	Team	Apps	(Points)
- Old Creightonians
- Penzance & Newlyn
- Camborne RFC
1957 - 1963	Leicester Tigers	147	
Coaching career
- Years: Team
- 1968 - 1983: Leicester Tigers

Herbert Victor "Chalkie" White (16 January 1929 – 24 January 2005) was an English rugby union player and later coach, instrumental in the success of Leicester Tigers.

White was born in Carlisle and served in the Royal Navy before becoming a schoolteacher, having previously undertaken a 4-year specialist course in Physical Education at Borough Road College, Isleworth. He played scrum-half for Old Creightonians, Penzance & Newlyn, Camborne RFC and Leicester Tigers before his career was ended after he was diagnosed with Ménière's disease and lost his sense of balance.

He thus turned to coaching Leicester, while teaching at Nottingham High School. At this time the game was still amateur, and coaching frowned upon as "cheating", but White installed a professional attitude at Leicester. This took the Tigers to John Player Cup wins in 1979, 1980 and 1981, and losing finalists in 1978 and 1983 (at the time the cup was the only organised competition). The Leicester team including Paul Dodge, Peter Wheeler and Clive Woodward. Woodward would later coach England to victory in the 2003 World Cup.

White also had a keen eye for young talent and was not afraid to give players their first opportunity to play at the top level.

Chalkie was never appointed England coach, England preferring instead Mike Davis, probably because of White's outspoken views. Instead he became divisional technical administrator to the South West region, based in Taunton.

He died at age 76 in 2005 from vascular dementia.
