= Steve Johnson (rugby union) =

English rugby union player

Steve Johnson is a former Leicester Tigers and England blindside flanker. He made 207 appearances during the period 1976-83 for Leicester Tigers.

Johnson scored 31 tries for the Tigers and captained the club from 1981 to 1983, making his final appearance in the John Player Cup final against Bristol. He was on the winning side three times in five cup finals and represented Leicestershire, Midlands, British Police and England B. He also came second in a Leicester Mercury vote which would be in the Leicester Tigers' walk of fame, as Leicester Tigers best ever blindside flanker.

He is currently a summariser for all Leicester Tigers games on BBC Radio Leicester.
