= Ian Smith (rugby union, born 1957) =

English rugby union player

- Born: Ian Robert Smith; 26 November 1957 (age 68) Leicester, Leicestershire, England
- School: Wyggeston Grammar School for Boys
- Occupation: schoolmaster

Rugby union career
- Position: Flanker
Amateur team(s)
Years	Team	Apps	(Points)
1977–91	Leicester Tigers	331	(268)
Coaching career
- Years: Team
- Leicester Tigers

Ian Robert "Dosser" Smith (born 26 November 1957), is a former English Rugby player and schoolmaster.

He played as flanker for Leicester Tigers. He was captain in the mid-1980s and later coach. He made 331 first XV appearances for Leicester, including five John Player Cup finals (1978–1982), of which three were won, and scored a total of 67 tries. However, he was not capped by England.

He was director of coaching at Oakham School, then at Uppingham School.

His son, centre/winger Matt Smith, played for Leicester Tigers from 2006 to 2019.
