= History of Leicester Tigers =

History of Leicester Tigers details the history of the rugby union club based in Leicester, England. Nicknamed the Tigers from 1885, Leicester have been a prominent club from the earliest days of organised English rugby dominating midlands rugby before the First World War; providing British Lions captains in 1930, 1936, 1997 and 2001; and winning 21 major titles since 1979 including a record 11 Premiership Rugby titles.

== History ==
=== Foundation ===
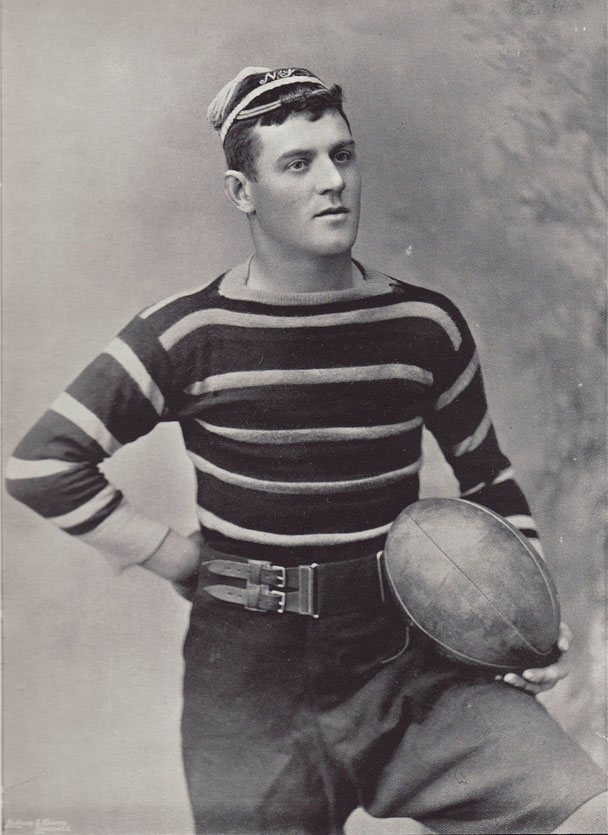
E. Redman, Leicester captain in 1895.

Leicester Football Club was formed in a meeting held in the city's George Hotel on 3 August 1880 by the merger of three smaller teams: Leicester Athletic Society FC, Leicester Amateur FC and Leicester Alert. The club's first game was a scoreless draw on 23 October against Moseley at the Belgrave Road Cycle and Cricket Ground. That first season Tigers play a local fixture list against the likes of Northampton, Nuneaton, Rushden, Kettering, Market Harborough, and Coventry. In 1881 the club joined the Midlands Counties Football Union enabling them to enter the Midlands Counties Cup the next season. Tigers first ever cup game was an away loss to Edgbaston Crusaders.

=== Early Years (1888–92) ===
This inauspicious start to the cup continued with losses to Moseley in each of the next three seasons. In 1888 Tigers fixture list started to expand outside the midlands, on 10 March they traveled to Valley Parade in Bradford to play Manningham F.C., the forerunners of soccer side Bradford City A.F.C. The 1888–89 season saw Tigers welcome back Manningham as well as Oldham and Swinton, Cardiff Harlequins became the club's first Welsh opponents. Leicester also reached their first Midland Counties Cup Final that year losing, again, to Moseley in front of 4,000 fans in Coventry.

1889–90 saw Tigers travel to Wales for the first time playing Cardiff and Newport on consecutive days, the Monday and Tuesday of Easter week. Gloucester were added to the fixture list in 1891–92, whilst on 13 February Tigers played in London for the first time, a 37–0 loss to Blackheath.

On 10 September 1892 Leicester played their first game at their present ground, Welford Road, against a Leicestershire XV. That season saw derby matches produce attendances up to 7,000 whilst 10,000 saw Leicester lose 12–0 to Coventry in the second round of the Midlands Counties Cup.

=== Tom Crumbie and the rise to national prominence (1895–1905) ===
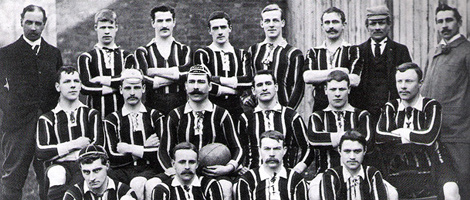
Leicester Tigers in 1894

Tom Crumbie was appointed secretary on 2 August 1895, a position he held for the next 33 years. Crumbie has been credited with dragging the club to national prominence, he disbanded reserve and third teams making the First XV an invitation side and introducing players from all over the country. During his tenure 26 players from the club became capped at international level.

The Midlands Counties Cup was secured for the first time in 1898; captain Arthur Jones lead the club to victories over Rugby (31–0), Burton (17–0) and Coventry (12–5) to reach the final against Moseley played on 6 April at Coventry's Butts ground. Jones was forced to miss the final on medical grounds but Tigers still took home the cup for the first time winning 5–3. The only score coming from Percy Oscroft after only 3 minutes, the try converted by Frank Jones, Arthur's brother.

Leicester's first defense of the cup was against local club Belgrave St Peter's, dispatched 68–3, and Tigers progressed to the final again in 1899 first requiring a replay to beat old rivals Moseley in the semi-finals. In the final Nuneaton were beaten 20–3. For the next three seasons Leicester had the better of Moseley beating them in the final each year, before seeing off Rugby in the final of 1903. Moseley were defeated again in 1904, Nottingham beaten 31–0 in 1905. Having won the Midlands Counties Cup every year from 1898 to 1905, they dropped out "to give other teams a chance".

In 1903 Jack Miles became the first home produced England international, playing on the wing against Wales in Swansea. He had come to prominence scoring 43 tries in 52 appearances.

Leicester's status as a premier club was confirmed in 1905 when a crowd of 20,000 was on hand to see the club face The Original All Blacks for the 5th game of their tour, despite losing 28–0 the club made an impression as four Tigers were called up by England for their test with the New Zealanders.

=== Allegations of professionalism (1908–14) ===
Tour portraits of Smith, Jackson and Jackett

In 1908 the club had three players selected for the 1908 Anglo-Welsh tour of New Zealand. John Jackett, Tom Smith and Fred Jackson became the first Tigers selected for an overseas tour. Controversy dogged Jackson; a secretive man it was claimed he had played for Northern Union side Swinton under the name "John Jones", such a charge was serious as it could have not only professionalised Jackson but all those who had associations with him. Jackson was withdrawn from the tour and settled in New Zealand.

Allegations of veiled professionalism were levelled at Leicester during the Rugby Football Union's (RFU) 1908 annual general meeting (AGM) and an inquiry ordered, though a vote to expel Leicester from the RFU was defeated. The inquiry was not only into professionalism but also the transfers of Jackson & Jackett as well as Alf Kewney and Tom Hogarth. On 30 January 1909, the day Leicester hosted an England v France test match, the RFU announced the outcome of the inquiry clearing the club on all charges in what has been described as a whitewash.

As if to refute the notion that the Tigers were made up purely of imported players there were 12 locals selected for the 1909 Midland Counties Cup Final against Coventry. Tigers won the cup, the first time they had entered after a four-year absence, 8–3 with two tries from Percy Lawrie.

December 1909 saw the beginning of a cherished tradition as Tigers played the Barbarians for the first time, holding them to a 9–9 draw. The fixture became a vital feature in the club's calendar delivering large attendances until open professionalism and league rugby in the 1990s forced it to gradually be abandoned due to fixture congestion.

Tigers won the Midlands Counties Cup three more times in four years to cement their place as the midland's premier side before the outbreak of war in 1914.

=== War and reconstruction of Welford Road (1914–21) ===
With war declared, the Leicester committee suspended matches on 3 September 1914. Two charity matches were played against the Barbarians in 1915 but otherwise Tigers played no rugby for the duration of the war. 17 players from the club lost their lives during the war.

Within six weeks of the Armistice being signed Tigers were playing their first game, facing the 4th battalion of the Leicestershire Regiment in what was also the official opening of the Members Stand on the north side of the ground.

Tigers enjoyed their first full season back; winger Teddy Haselmere scored a club record 59 tries, no man before or since has even reached 40. At this time formations were not set in the way they are now and Tigers regularly played with 7 forwards and 8 backs, meaning overlaps for the wingers were plentiful.

The New Stand (later renamed the Crumbie Stand in honour of Tom Crumbie) costing £21,000 (approx £850,000 in 2016) was officially opened on 2 October 1920 before a match against Headingley by the president of the RFU Ernest Prescott, Tigers celebrated with a 33–3 victory.

Terracing was added in front of the new stand the next season and the Members Stand extended to give Welford Road a seated capacity of 10,250. Subscriptions for stand seats was 25 shillings (£50 in 2016 money) and unemployed men gained free entry to the end terraces on production of their out of work card. These ground developments lead to attendances that would not be bettered until the 2000s as 20,000 fans watched the loss to Newport on 29 October 1921.

=== Tourists in the 20s and the death of Tom Crumbie (1922–28) ===
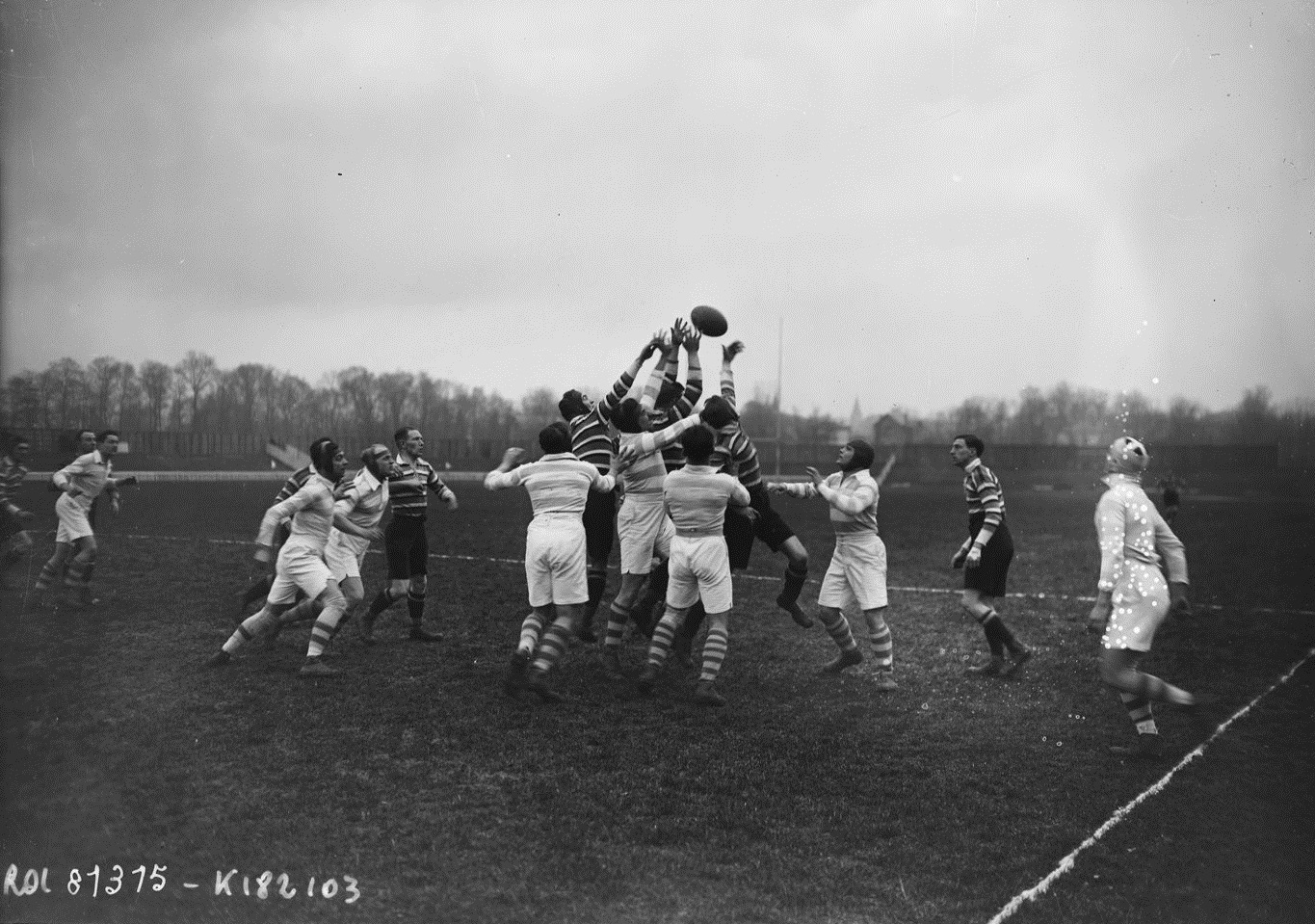
Leicester's return match against Racing in February 1923

Leicester welcomed their first French visitors on 28 December 1922 when Racing club de France formed part of Tigers' Christmas festival, the hosts winning 4–0 thanks to a Haselmere drop goal. Tigers returned the visit in February 1923 but lost 19–9 despite scoring three tries.

The visit of the Invincible All Blacks on 4 October 1924 saw a record attendance at Welford Road of 35,000 that stands to this day. Tigers were beaten 27–0 by the tourists but good things were still to come that season as Leicestershire won their only County Championship against Gloucestershire with the entire starting XV coming from the Tigers.

The next season saw a visit by the New Zealand Maori and a closer result, Tigers leading at half time 8–3 thanks to a try from Ewert Farndon and 5 points from the boot of Doug Prentice but eventually succumbing 15–13 to the Maori tourists.

Tom Crumbie died on 13 March 1928, he was described as the cog around which the club functioned and contemporary reports say he epitomised the club. Tigers wore black armbands for their next fixture against Penarth. On 4 April the club appointed his successor Eric Thorneloe and six months later renamed The New Stand as The Crumbie Stand in honour of Crumbie.

=== Personal honours as club's fortunes wane (1930–39) ===
Club captain Doug Prentice was given the honour of captaining the 1930 British Lions tour to New Zealand and Australia, alongside two Leicester teammates Joe Kendrew and George Beamish. Irish forward George Beamish played 21 games on the tour, the most of any player, and is credited with introducing the green of Ireland into the British & Irish Lions' playing kit.

No doubt the presence of such star players lead the next season to the first BBC radio broadcast of a Tigers game. The match against Waterloo on 29 November 1930 was the first radio broadcast of a Leicester game; Tigers won 21–5.

The Great Depression hit the club's gates hard. With no cup or league competitions attendances for friendly fixtures tumbled to a low of 346 against Bridgwater Albion in 1934. It took the introduction of leagues in the 1980s before crowd numbers returned to their pre-depression level. The club's poor finances meant an invitation by Amatori Milano to tour Italy had to be declined.

Personal honours for the players masked some of the decline though. Bernard Gadney became the club's first home produced England captain in 1934 and was captain when four Leicester players were part of the first England side to beat the All Blacks. Tigers winger Alexander Obolensky scored two tries on debut in the 13–0 win. Gadney also became the club's second player to captain the British Lions on their tour to Argentina where he was joined by Obolensky and Charles Beamish.

1936–37 was the worst season since 1889–90 for the club with only 14 wins from 39 matches. Results picked up slightly the next two season before the Second World War intervened and regularly fixtures were abandoned for the next five years. 26 Tigers players lost their lives in the war.

=== Post War move away from invitation side (1945–57) ===
Fifteen days after VE Day the club's committee held their first meeting to determine the future of the club. The roof of the Crumbie Stand had been damaged in air raids, there was a collapsed wall at the Welford Road end and significant repairs to the clubhouse were required where the Army had bored holes into the floor. The club ran two teams that year; the First XV and Leicestershire Harlequins, named for the war-time side that provided rugby for locals on leave or passing servicemen.

The Harlequins were quickly changed to be an "A XV", the first time the club had run more than one side for 40 years. The decision was unpopular with the junior clubs that provided the bulk of the players for the side. It ran for ten seasons until being discontinued in 1955.

In 1947 local winger Harry Sibson joined from Aylestonians and went on to play 183 games. Sibson is credited for the introduction of a new offside law at scrums. Sibson fulfilled many roles including club secretary and club president.

Tigers first televised game by the BBC was on 3 February 1951 when they beat London Scottish 14–0 at the Richmond Athletic Ground; earlier that year Tigers had refused a request to televise the Barbarians game fearing it might affect the gate.

Romania became the first international side to face Tigers for 25 years when they played on 8 September 1956. The game ended a 6–6 draw.

The club underwent a significant restructure in the 1956–57 season. The practice of being an "invitation" club featuring only a First XV was to stop and Tigers were to adopt a more traditional membership club based approach with multiple sides. The "A XV" was to be re-introduced under the name "Extra First XV" with a third "Colts XV" also formed. With only one side, the club had been suffering losing players because of a lack of regular rugby for those on the fringes of the starting side. Eric Thorneloe retired from his role of secretary at the end of the season giving the feel that this was the end of an era.

=== Matthews' team breaks record and White appointed coach (1959–68) ===
In 1959 Tony O'Reilly and Phil Horrocks-Taylor were selected for the 1959 British Lions tour to Australia and New Zealand, the first since Gadney 23 years earlier. Horrocks-Taylor's influence is best shown by the 1960–61 season where the club won 17 of 22 matches with him in the side and only 7 of 20 without.

The 1963–64 season saw 26 wins the most in 29 seasons but attendances were poor, only three games were watched by more than a thousand people and even the Barbarians fixture drew only 4,284. The season also saw David Matthews set the record for most consecutive appearances for the club with 109.

Matthews was to become captain in 1965 and in 1966–67 lead the club to a record 33 wins. The previous record had stood at 31 games since 1898.

Chalkie White became coach in 1968; the same season Tom Berry became Leicester's first president of the RFU. White combined with captain Graham Willars to reform Tigers play in light of rule changes that summer which banned kicking directly to touch from outside your own 25 yard area and drastically reduced kicking. Tigers scored 122 tries and 657 points that season. Moves towards a return to competitive rugby were made with discussion held on leagues or a knock-out cup. Tigers president Nick Hughes favoured regional pools before a national knock-out tournament.

Despite usually returning more wins than losses Leicester's standing at the time was not what it is now. Coventry had not been beaten for 16 years for instance, and international honours were limited.

=== Introduction of the National Cup and first Youth side (1970–73) ===
1970–71 saw Peter Wheeler emerge as first choice hooker having made his debut the year before, he ended the season on England's tour to the Far East. Attendance for the annual Barbarians game hit a nadir with a crowd of only 2,518.

The 1971–72 season saw changes which, over time, would radically change both the club and the game. The RFU introduced for the first time a national knock-out cup competition for clubs and on 16 November 1971 Tigers played their first competitive cup match since 1914, a 10–3 defeat to Nottingham at their Beeston ground.

Also introduced that season was Tigers' first "Youth" XV, based on the Leicester Ravens a collection of the best 14 and 15 year olds in the county. Their first game was on 15 April 1972 and they made an immediate impact, captain of that side was Steve Kenney who would score the winning try in the 1979 Cup Final. Only six year later Paul Dodge became the first graduate to win an international cap.

Tigers attack was going from strength to strength recording their highest yet points total for a season in both 1971–72, when he scored 789 points, and in 1972–73, when he scored 988. The previous record set in 1919–20 was 756. But defence was an issue conceding 40 points to both Coventry and Bath. Tigers reached the quarter-finals of the Cup in 1973.

11 September 1973 saw Tigers beat the touring Fijian national team 22–17 in front of a 12,000 crowd and on 3 October beat touring Australian Shute Shield champions Randwick 15–10. There was still no joy in the Cup with a first round defeat to Northampton also meaning Tigers failed to qualify the next season. Tigers fly-half Alan Old started for England as they beat New Zealand in New Zealand for the first time and then beat Australia at Twickenham.

=== Cup success (1974–80) ===
Tigers were not involved in the 1974–75 Cup and lost in the 1st round of the 1975–76 Cup to Liverpool. This forced the club into the Midlands qualifiers for the only time. They beat Nottingham, local junior club Westleigh and Kettering to qualify for the 1976–77 Cup where a win against Wakefield lead to a second round defeat against Moseley.

This era saw a huge increase in the popularity of the Barbarians annual fixture which crowds of 15,000 in 1973 & 1975, 17,000 in 1974 and 21,000 in 1976. This contrasted with usual crowds in the low hundreds.

1976–77 saw the introduction of regional "Merit Tables" by the RFU, the first step on the road to full leagues. Based around traditional fixtures Tigers faced Bedford, Birmingham, Coventry, Moseley, Northampton, Nuneaton, Nottingham and Rugby in the Midlands Merit Table finishing second to Moseley with a record of played 8 won 6.

It took 6 years before Leicester were drawn at home in the cup but in 1977–78 they received four in a row beating Hartlepool Rovers, Rosslyn Park, Northampton and Coventry on their way to a first Twickenham final against Gloucester. The game ended in a 6–3 loss to the Cherry and Whites; the attendance was 25,282 more than double the previous season. Cup success also coincided with Tigers membership more than doubling from 750 in 1978 to 2,000 by the end of 1979.

Home cup draws continued the next season as Northampton (29–3) and Broughton Park (30–7) were beaten at Welford Road. Bedford were beaten at Goldington Road in the quarter-finals before Wasps were defeated 43–7 in the semi-finals. The final was against perennial rivals Moseley and Steve Kenney scored with three minutes remaining to win it 15–12 for Leicester.

Tigers retained the cup in 1979–80 beating Orrell (16–7), Moseley (17–7), London Scottish and Harlequins in the early rounds before beating London Irish 21–9 in the final at Twickenham in front of a record crowd of 27,000. 1979–80 also saw Tigers win the Midlands Merit Table for the first time with a record played 7 games and won 6 and provide four players in England's grandslam of 1980. Clive Woodward and Peter Wheeler were selected for the 1980 British Lions tour to South Africa, Paul Dodge joined them as an injury replacement and all three were selected for the third test defeat against the Springboks.

=== Centenary ===
To celebrate the club's centenary a 6 match tour to Australia and Fiji was arranged in August 1980, the first undertaken by an English club in the southern hemisphere. Tigers lost 22–12 to Queensland in their first match but recorded victories over Eastern Suburbs and Randwick before traveling to Fiji and winning three games.

Prestige fixtures staged at Welford Road to mark the centenary were the visit of the Irish Wolfhounds who were beaten 10–6; Romania who won 39–7, with Florică Murariu scoring 4 tries for the visitors and a return visit from Queensland who were beaten 21–9.

Tigers retained the Midlands Merit Table title in November with an undefeated record of played 7, won 6, drawn 1. On 25 April 1981 Tigers traveled to Moseley, where Dusty Hare broke the world record for points scored in first class fixtures. His total of 3,658 over took the previous record held by Moseley's own Sam Doble.

The cup was won again in 1980–81. Roundhay, Bristol and Sale were beaten in the early rounds; London Scottish in the semi-finals became the first cup game to go to extra time before Les Cusworth kicked two drop goals to seal a fourth successive trip to Twickenham. Leicester scored three tries to beat Gosforth 22–15. This meant they were allowed to keep the trophy.

=== 1980s to the beginning of league rugby (1981–88) ===
In the early 1980s league rugby was still a controversial idea when proposed by an RFU report in 1980 and met with mixed reaction honorary secretary Jerry Day foreseeing that "If a club wanted to compete .. in a league system it would have to become almost professional", whilst Wheeler thought leagues "long overdue".

Tigers 18 match unbeaten run the cup was over in 1982 when the club lost to Moseley in the semi-finals, the club wasn't to win the cup again until 1993 though there were finals in 1983 and 1989. This was also Chalkie White's last season with the club after 30 years as a player, administrator or coach.

In 1981 Tigers played Australia leading until the 78th minute only to lose 18–15; this was the first visit by one of the three major southern hemisphere nations since 1924.

A new generation of players who were to shape the club made their debuts in the early '80s; Dean Richards in 1982 against Neath, John Wells in 1983 against Harlequins and Rory Underwood in 1983 against Birmingham.

Seven Leicester players were part of the Midlands side which defeated the All Blacks 19–13 at Welford Road in November 1983, with six player including captain Peter Wheeler named in the England side that also beat the tourists 15–9 at Twickenham.

Off the field the club were beginning to develop commercially, signing a five-year sponsorship worth £30,000 with brewers Ind Coope in 1984.

In 1985 the penultimate step towards league rugby was taken as the John Smith's Merit Table A was launched. It was a national competition that featured the best sides from the four regional merit tables but was still based on old traditional fixtures; Tigers played 10 counting games in the first season while Harlequins played only four. The national merit tables ran for two seasons with the table based on win percentage to take account of the different numbers of games played; Gloucester and Bath each topped the table once, Tigers finished 4th and 2nd.

League rugby was finally launched in England in 1987. The main difference from the merit table was all sides would now have to play all other sides in a round robin, though a fixtures dispute meant the Tigers v Gloucester match was not played. Tigers hit the top of the league on 28 November following a 21–3 win away at Moseley and stayed there losing only one match all season. When they beat Waterloo in front of 7,130 supporters on the last day of the 1987–88 season, Easter Monday 4 April, the Tigers became England's first official champions.

Tigers finished the season on 37 points, one ahead of nearest rivals Wasps.

=== New generation emerges as progress falters (1988–92) ===
The 1988–89 National Division One saw Tigers slump to 6th in the league, their joint worst ever finish, but more joy was to be had in the Cup as Tigers beat Liverpool St Helens (37–6), Rosslyn Park (23–9), Wasps (22–18) and Quins (16–7) to set up a final with Bath. In what was Dusty Hare's 394th and last game for the club Tigers lead 6–0 at half time but lost 10–6 with Stuart Barnes scoring Bath's winning try in the 78th minute.

Martin Johnson made his debut for the First XV in February 1989 whilst Les Cusworth retired at the end of the 1989–90 season. In August 1990 Leicester appointed their first paid official: Tony Russ, who had led Saracens to promotion then 4th place in the league before accepting the role of "Director of Coaching" at Leicester.

Neil Back joined that summer and made his debut at home against Bedford, whilst Graham Rowntree was promoted from the club's youth ranks and made his debut in October against Oxford University. The changing of the guard from Cup winning team of the early 80s was complete when Paul Dodge retired at the end of the 1990–91 season.

The early 1990s saw the emergence of Leicester's renowned ABC Club, so called because of the letters the front row players wore on their shirts; Graham Rowntree played loosehead and wore "A", hooker Richard Cockerill wore "B" and Darren Garforth played tighthead prop and wore "C". The trio started 166 games together between 1992 and 2002, Garforth and Rowntree started another 72 games together at prop, but with different hookers.

=== Mid Nineties success and near misses (1993–98) ===
From 1993 Leicester enjoyed a remarkable nine trophies in 10 years. This streak started when a young pack featuring Rowntree, Cockerill, Garforth, Poole, Johnson and Back defeated London Scottish, Nottingham, Exeter and Northampton to set up a Twickenham date with Harlequins who they defeated 23–16 in the 1993 cup final. In the 1993–94 season, Tigers made the cup final but this time Leicester fell short to rivals Bath, losing 21–9. Leicester were also runners-up in the league to Bath.

Leicester were English champions again in 1995, that season the league was played in two main blocks with sporadic fixtures in between; the first nine games were played on consecutive weekends from 10 September 1994 to 5 November 1994, two games were played in January 1995, one in February 1995 and one at the beginning of March 1995 before finishing with five games in six weeks from 25 March to 29 April. In the first period Tigers won seven, drew against Bath away, and lost to Bristol to leave them second in the table. Against Orrell on 14 January 1995 Martin Johnson captained Leicester for the first time, regular captain Dean Richards and vice captain John Wells being unavailable. Tigers won 29–19.

Preparations for the 1995 Rugby World Cup which started in May were deemed all important so England players Johnson and Rory Underwood, missed Leicester's February league match against Gloucester where Leicester slipped to a second defeat. Leicester returned to the top after a win against West Hartlepool and had crucial wins against Bath and Sale. The title was clinched on the last game of the season against Bristol.

Open professionalism was declared in August 1995, though a moratorium was declared by the RFU until the next season. The 1995–96 season was another of just missing out to perennial rivals Bath. The Somerset side clinched the league on the final day of the season; despite Bath only drawing at home with Sale, Tigers were unable to beat Harlequins at Welford Road, losing 21–19. Leicester's full back John Liley had a poor day kicking at goal missing 6 of 9 kicks including a last minute attempt which would have sealed the match, and with it the title. Bath secured a league and cup double after defeating Leicester in the Cup Final. The match is perhaps best remembered for the controversial penalty try awarded by referee Steve Lander for repeated infringement which gave the match to Bath, and after the final whistle Leicester flanker Neil Back pushing Lander to the ground. The act earned Back a 6-month suspension from the game.

The second-place finish in the league did secure Tigers place in the second season of the Heineken Cup, the English clubs were not involved in the first season. Leicester's Heineken Cup debut was against Leinster at Donnybrook. Leicester beat Leinster, Scottish Borders, Pau and Llanelli in the group stage before beating Harlequins (quarter-finals) and Toulouse (semi-finals) to set up the final against Brive. The match was close at half time; Leicester were behind 8–6, but the French side ran riot in the second half to win 28–9. Tigers faltered in the league but did secure silverware, beating Sale 9–3 in the 1997 Pilkington Cup Final. That summer Martin Johnson was named as captain of the 1997 British Lions tour to South Africa; Eric Miller, Graham Rowntree, Neil Back, Austin Healey and Will Greenwood were also named as tourists.

The 1997–98 season started with the Heineken Cup, and Leicester secured a quarter-final play-off after finishing second in their group containing Leinster, Toulouse and Amatori Milan. Tigers beat the Italian side twice but lost away to Leinster and at home to Toulouse. In the quarter-final play-off, Leicester beat Glasgow 90-19 but lost in the quarter-final proper away to Pau. Domestically, Tigers were a mixed bag, winning 12, losing 8 and drawing 2 games to finish fourth in the Allied Dunbar Premiership. In February 1998 Dean Richards was appointed as director of rugby following Bob Dwyer's sacking.

=== Six Titles in Four Years, Deano's golden years (1998–2003) ===
Following a dispute between the English clubs and European Cup organisers there was no English involvement in the 1998–99 Heineken Cup; this led to an expanded Premiership of 14 clubs and 28 games. Tigers started the new season well with a 49–15 win against Harlequins and wins against London Scottish, Northampton and Bedford to see Tigers top the table at the end of September. Losses against Saracens and London Irish in rounds 5 & 7 saw Tigers slip to 3rd in October; Leicester regained the lead in the table after victories against Richmond and West Hartlepool and were never to lose it despite a loss to Wasps two weeks later. Dreams of the double were dashed by Richmond in the quarter-finals of the cup, Johnson received a white card (at the time signifying 10 minutes in the sin bin) and during his absence the Londoners scored their two tries in a 15–13 win. The next week Johnson was sin binned again, this time in a league match against closest challengers Northampton, but even with Pat Howard also sin binned and Leicester down to 13 men for a period so outstanding was Johnson's play they won 22–15. Mathematically Leicester's third English championship title was sealed in the penultimate match of the season away to Newcastle Falcons. Johnson's form was such that he was named as the Premiership's Player of the Season.

On 28 August 1999 a record ten Tigers were capped for England in the World Cup warm up game against Canada. During the 1999–2000 Premiership season five early season games clashed with the 1999 Rugby World Cup in this period wins were worth two points, whilst wins later in the season were worth three points. Tigers started the season poorly, losing two of the first three games. Even with three other wins Leicester finished the World Cup period in 8th position in the league. English clubs returned to European competition but in the 1999–2000 Heineken Cup Leicester lost four pool games to exit at the first stage.

However they were to only lose one further Premiership game, away to Saracens in December. Tigers retained their title on 14 May 2000 with a 30–23 win against Bristol at the Memorial Ground. The trophy was presented the next week at Welford Road following their 13th consecutive league win, a 43–25 win against Premiership runners-up Bath.

Having dominated domestic rugby for the previous two years Leicester were desperate to avenge their 1997 Heineken Cup Final defeat and claim their first European title. Local rivals Northampton Saints had claimed the previous season's title with perennial rivals Bath claiming the title in 1998. Tigers were drawn with Pau, Glasgow and Pontypridd in their Heineken Cup pool. Wins at home to Pau and away to Glasgow preceded a loss in Wales to Pontypridd that was quickly avenged a week later at Welford Road. Two wins in the final two pool games led to a January quarter-final against Swansea which Leicester won 41–10.

Domestically Leicester were again top of the table and at this stage 11 points clear of Northampton in second place. The gap was pushed to 18 points on 10 March 2001 when Tigers beat Northampton at Franklin's Gardens and Tigers' third successive English league title was formally sealed on 17 March 2001 against Newcastle.

With the domestic title sealed, Leicester went into the Heineken Cup semi-finals against Gloucester. Leon Lloyd's try gave Leicester a 19–15 win, despite Martin Johnson spending time in the sin bin, to set up the final in the Parc des Princes against Stade Français Paris. In the final Johnson was again sin binned but thanks to tries from Neil Back and two from Leon Lloyd Tigers prevailed winning 34–30 to secure the club's first continental title. Tigers had won the inaugural Premiership playoffs the week before so also sealed an unprecedented treble.

That summer Martin Johnson was named captain for the 2001 British & Irish Lions tour to Australia, becoming the first man to lead two tours; Austin Healey and Neil Back were also named in the original touring squad whilst Dorian West and Martin Corry were to join the tour as injury replacements.

Leicester became the first side to retain a European title after beating Munster in 2002. Leicester also retained their Premiership title. They opened the season with a loss away to Newcastle, having rested their summer Lions, but try bonus point wins in their next three games quickly saw Leicester return to the top of the table. The Heineken Cup pool stages started with wins against Llanelli and Calvisano. Back to back wins against USA Perpignan in October and November saw Leicester through as group winners but a loss to Llanelli in the final round allowed the Welsh side through to the knock-out stage as a best runner-up. In the quarter-final Leicester faced Leinster at Welford Road winning 29–18.

After only two defeats in 17 Premiership matches Leicester had the chance to seal the title against London Wasps but in a remarkable game lost 24–36, Wasps scores came from ten penalties and two drop goals. Leicester secure their fourth successive title against Newcastle on 13 April 2002 at Welford Road. This brought the club's total to six championship, tying Bath's record.

Two weeks later Johnson captained Leicester as they traveled to Nottingham's City Ground for the Heineken Cup semi-final against Llanelli. Tigers won thanks to a Tim Stimpson penalty which hit both the post and the cross bar before going through the posts. Tigers were again victorious in the final winning 15–9 against Munster; the match is best remembered for Austin Healey's try and Neil Back's handling in a last-minute scrum on the Tigers' line. Though Tigers did have two further tries ruled out in dubious circumstances. Johnson had a try ruled out after 10 minutes after also having a first-minute score from Freddie Tuilagi ruled out.

Leicester during this time had a very good home record; they went 57 games unbeaten at home in a period that stretched from 30 December 1997 to 30 November 2002 and included 52 successive wins. During these four seasons Leicester lost only 14 games out of the 92 they played.

In the 2003 Rugby World Cup, the club had seven representatives in the winning England squad: Martin Johnson (captain), Neil Back, Martin Corry, Ben Kay, Lewis Moody, Dorian West and Julian White. However while these players were away Leicester's form suffered, even with the returning players they were knocked out of that season's Heineken Cup in the group stages and were 12 points away from Heineken Cup qualification for the next season with 8 games remaining when they decided to sack Dean Richards.

=== Post Richards era (2004–08) ===
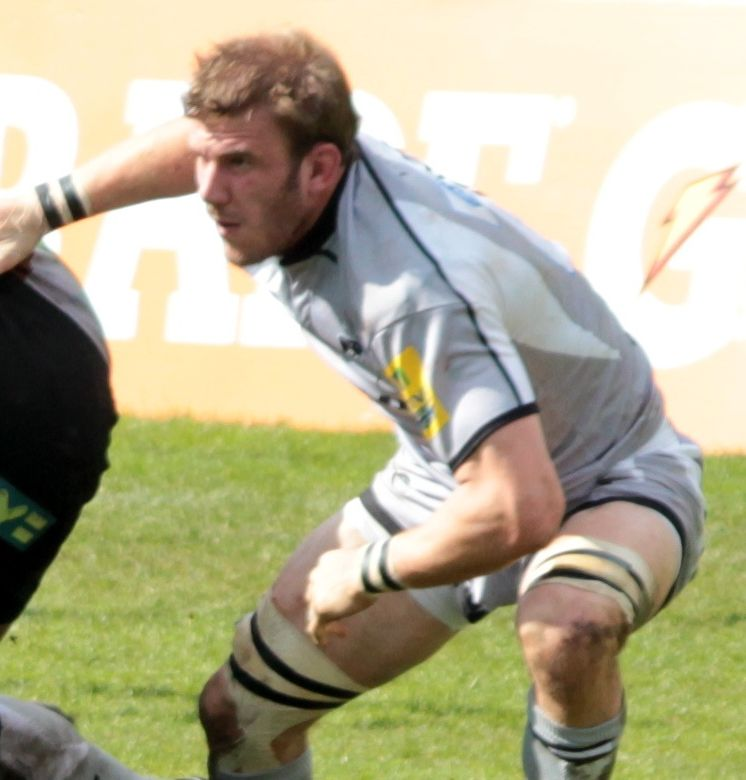
Tom Croft made his debut in 2006 after coming through the club's academy

After Richards' departure Tigers turned to his assistant coach John Wells as temporary cover. Wells' tenure saw Tigers fortunes improve and Heineken Cup qualification for the next season secured. He was named as Richards' permanent successor on 28 April 2004 whilst Pat Howard and Richard Cockerill were announced as his assistant coaches.

In John Wells' first full season in charge of the team Leicester finished the regular season top of the league, also progressing to the semi-final of the Heineken cup before defeat to Toulouse at the Walkers Stadium. In Martin Johnson and Neil Back's last game for Leicester they lost the Premiership Final to Wasps. After this game John Wells left Leicester to take up a position in the RFU's coaching academy, eventually rising to England forwards coach. He was succeeded by Pat Howard

In 2005–06, the Tigers finished second to the Sale Sharks in the league before losing to the same team in the Premiership final. They again proceeded to the knock-out stage of the Heineken Cup, again they lost at the Walkers Stadium to Bath. In the new Anglo-Welsh Cup Leicester won their group but lost in the semi-finals to Wasps at the Millennium Stadium in Cardiff, Wales.

Over the summer of 2006 the core of a new pack was recruited especially Jordan Crane, the Number 8, who arrived from Leeds; Martin Castrogiovanni joined from Calvisano and Marcos Ayerza joined from domestic rugby in his native Argentina. Tom Croft also made his debut this season after coming through the club's academy system.

Leicester won their first piece of silverware for five years on 15 April 2007, beating the Ospreys 41–35 with tries from Tom Varndell, Tom Croft, Ben Kay and Alesana Tuilagi to win the EDF Energy Cup at Twickenham Stadium. This was quickly repeated with Premiership success on 12 May at Twickenham with a 44–16 win over Gloucester. However Leicester failed to win an unprecedented treble, by losing the Heineken Cup Final at Twickenham on 20 May to Wasps.

It was announced on 28 December 2006 that the head coach Pat Howard would leave the club at the end of the season, to return to his native Australia. He was succeeded by the then-head coach of Argentina, Marcelo Loffreda after the 2007 Rugby World Cup. Loffreda guided Leicester through the group stages of the EDF cup to the semi-final where they defeated Wasps in a knock-out game for the first time since the 1980s. This set up a rematch of the previous years final against the Ospreys, which Leicester lost. After losing all away games in the Heineken Cup that season Leicester failed to progress to the quarter-finals. In the league Leicester struggled until a last minute last day try by Tom Varndell beat Harlequins to set up a rematch of the previous seasons Premiership Final against Gloucester. Once again Leicester were successful late on, this time utilising Andy Goode's kicking to secure a last minute victory. In the final they had no such luck losing to perennial rivals Wasps. After this final; despite guiding Leicester to two Twickenham finals and only being in the job seven-months Loffreda was sacked.

=== Cockerill takes the reins (2009–16) ===
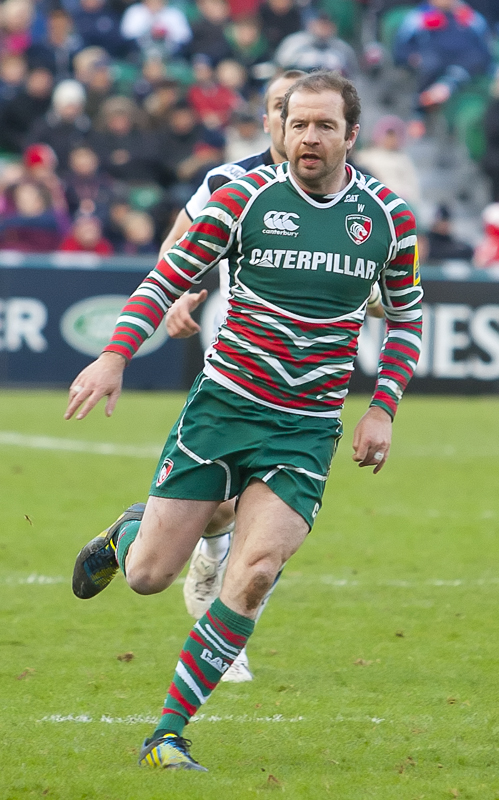
Geordan Murphy, pictured in 2012, played 322 games for Leicester between 1997 and 2013. He is the most decorated player in the club's history with 8 Premiership titles, 2 European titles and 2 Anglo-Welsh cups.

Heyneke Meyer was the board's choice to replace Loffreda, however unfortunate family circumstances led to his resignation. Richard Cockerill took over until the end of the season, having guided Leicester to a home Heineken Cup quarter-final against Bath. He was appointed head coach on 17 April 2009 and promoted to director of rugby on 19 July 2010 following Leicester's second Premiership title in as many years.

On Sunday 3 May 2009 Leicester Tigers made history in their Heineken cup semi-final against Cardiff when for the first time in the competition's history a place kicking competition was required to decide the outcome. The teams were drawing 26–26 after normal time and there was no score during extra time. Leicester won this 7–6 after backrow forwards Newby and Crane both succeeded with their kicks at goal.

In the 2009 Premiership final Leicester beat London Irish (10–9), with a try from Jordan Crane and five points from the boot of Julien Dupuy. The following week Leicester lost the Heineken Cup final in Edinburgh to Irish province Leinster, containing former Leicester favourites captain Leo Cullen and openside Shane Jennings.

On Friday 6 November 2009 Leicester hosted the world champion Springboks to mark the opening of the new stand on the north side of the ground. In a tight and compelling match a young Leicester side triumphed 22–17, with a try from Lucas González Amorosino and 17 points from scrum half Ben Youngs.

Tigers retained their Premiership title on 30 May 2010 as they defeated Saracens 33–27, coming back from behind 5 times in the match the win was secured by a crucial late try scored by Dan Hipkiss.

Domestic success continued with Tigers reaching Premiership finals but losing in 2011 and 2012, against Saracens and Harlequins respectively. Silverware was still secured in 2012 though by winning the LV Cup against Northampton at Worcester's Sixways Stadium. The competition was not viewed as highly as it was when Tigers won in 2007; it was primarily played on international game weekends and the final was no longer at Twickenham and held during the Six Nations.

In 2013 Tigers won their record extending 10th English title defeating local rivals Northampton Saints 37–17 at Twickenham despite losing fly half Toby Flood to injury in the first half. Tries from Niall Morris, Graham Kitchener, Manu Tuilagi and Vereniki Goneva sealed the match, with the final three tries coming after Northampton hooker Dylan Hartley's red card for verbally abusing referee Wayne Barnes.

Northampton gained their revenge the next year beating Tigers 21–20 in the Premiership semi-final at Franklin's Gardens. Tigers qualified for the playoffs the next two years but suffered heavy away defeats to Bath (47–10) and Saracens (44–17).

=== Post Cockerill era (2017–2020) ===
On Monday 2 January 2017, after a start to the season including a 34–21 defeat to Wasps at home, heavy defeats by Glasgow and by Munster in the European Champions Cup, Leicester's board decided to sack Richard Cockerill as director of rugby with immediate effect after a 16–12 home defeat by champions Saracens. Aaron Mauger was placed in temporary charge of the team whilst a full review of the club's coaching structure was undertaken.

The sacking of Richard Cockerill did not improve results, Tigers lost heavily in Europe to Racing 92 and were beaten by Glasgow Warriors 43–0 at Welford Road, the club's worst defeat at home in a competitive match. The club did though progress in the less prestigious Anglo-Welsh Cup beating Saracens at Allianz Park in the semi-finals before beating Exeter 16–12 in the final held at The Stoop to become the first team to win the cup three times since the Welsh sides joined the competition. On 20 March, the day after the Anglo-Welsh Cup victory, the club then made an announcement that Matt O'Connor would return as head coach with immediate effect, replacing the departing Aaron Mauger. Under O'Connor Tigers secured their 13th consecutive playoff appearance where they lost narrowly to Wasps 21–20.

In the 2017–18 season successive home defeats to Northampton and Newcastle in Leicester's final two home games saw Tigers miss the playoffs for the first time since 2005.

After a 40–6 defeat in the opening game of the 2018–19 Premiership Rugby season O'Connor was sacked by the club with immediate effect. Geordan Murphy was placed in charge of the side on an interim basis. Murphy was then made the permanent head coach on 18 December 2018 despite the team being on an eight match losing run. Results did not improve and Tigers were involved in a battle against relegation for the first time, a win against bottom of the table Newcastle eased relegation fears, but a final day defeat against Bath saw Leicester finish 11th in the Premiership, their worst ever finish. The club's owners officially put Leicester up for sale in June 2019.

After a delayed start to the season due to the 2019 Rugby World Cup Tigers fortunes did not improve and in October speculation began that Steve Borthwick would be brought in to coach the club. On 10 December 2019 BBC Radio Leicester reported that Mark Bakewell has left his role as forwards coach, with the club eventually confirming his departure on 18 December, and on 21 January 2020 it was announced that England's forwards coach Borthwick would join the club as head coach once his duties with England were finished. His start was later confirmed as July 2020.

=== Impact of Covid-19 and renewal (2020–) ===
On 16 March 2020, the 2019–20 Premiership Rugby season was suspended for an initial five weeks due to the COVID-19 pandemic in the United Kingdom, with group training suspended indefinitely on 23 March. After the cancellation of games the club implemented 25% wage cuts on all staff, including players, on 22 April 2020 it was reported that Tigers players were unhappy with this and had engaged a solicitor to represent them, though this was quickly denied, on 11 May 2020 CEO Simon Cohen left the club after an 8-year tenure and was replaced by Andrea Pinchen. On 4 June 2020 it was revealed that Tigers were set to lose up to £5m of revenue during the coronavirus enforced shutdown, eventually making 31 employees redundant. On 29 June it was reported that the pay dispute which started in April could result in several players leaving the club after refusing to cut their pay, with 5 players including Manu Tuilagi and Telusa Veainu leaving later that week after refusing to amend their contracts in light of the global pandemic.

The completion of the delayed 2019–20 Premiership Rugby season between August and October saw another 11th-place finish for Leicester, saved from relegation only by a points deduction from Saracens for breaching the salary cap. On 13 November 2020, just eight days before the start of the 2020–21 Premiership Rugby season Geordan Murphy left as director of rugby in a decision described as "mutual". With new head coach Steve Borthwick now in charge of team selection Leicester got off to a winning start against Gloucester. In his first season at the club Borthwick guided Leicester to the 2020–21 European Rugby Challenge Cup final and 6th place in the league, securing Champions Cup rugby for the first time in two years.

Tigers started the following season strongly, five wins in the opening five rounds was the club's best start in the Premiership era, the club remained unbeaten for 15 games in all competitions, the second best start to a season ever, but failed to tie the record after losing to Wasps on 9 January 2022. A week later Leicester overcame an 18-point deficit in the second half to beat Connacht, a Hosea Saumaki try sealing the win on the final play of the game, and secure progress to their first Champions Cup knock out stages since 2016.

In Europe, Leicester progressed past Clermont Auvergne over two legs, despite getting red cards in both matches, but lost at home to Leinster 23–14, after falling behind 20–0 in the first half to the Irish side.

Domestically they secured a first home play-off semi final since 2013, with two games to spare, after a 56–26 win against Bristol Bears. Tigers' winger Chris Ashton broke the Premiership Rugby all-time try scoring record in this match, his hat-trick taking him to 95 career league tries. In the semi-final they faced local rivals Northampton Saints, but much of the build up was focused on recently retired former captain Tom Youngs whose wife, Tiffany, died from cancer in week preceding the match. His brother Ben Youngs started the match, and it was his half back partner George Ford who inspired the victory scoring a "full house" with a try, conversion, penalty & drop goal for 22 points in a 27–13 win.

In the final Leicester faced Saracens, a re-match of the 2010 & 2011 finals. Ford wasn't to last long in the final withdrawing injured in the 23rd minute & being replaced by Freddie Burns. With the matching tied 12-12 it was Burns who scored the 80th minute drop goal to win Leicester their 11th English title, only two seasons after finishing in 11th place.

Speculation began that Borthwick was in line to succeed Eddie Jones as England head coach after the 2023 Rugby World Cup, but after a poor 2022 Autumn internationals Jones was replaced by Borthwick on 19 December 2022. He was initially replaced as Leicester head coach in an interim capacity by Richard Wigglesworth, the club's starting scrum half in the 2022 Premiership final & previous attack coach. On 22 February 2023, it was announced that Dan McKellar would take the role on a full time basis from 1 July 2023, previously having been Australia's forwards coach.

== Sources ==
- Farmer, Stuart; Hands, David (2014). Tigers - Official history of Leicester Football Club. The Rugby Development Foundation. ISBN 978-0-9930213-0-5.
