= Martin Johnson (rugby union) =

British Lions & England international rugby union player & coach

Martin Johnson CBE
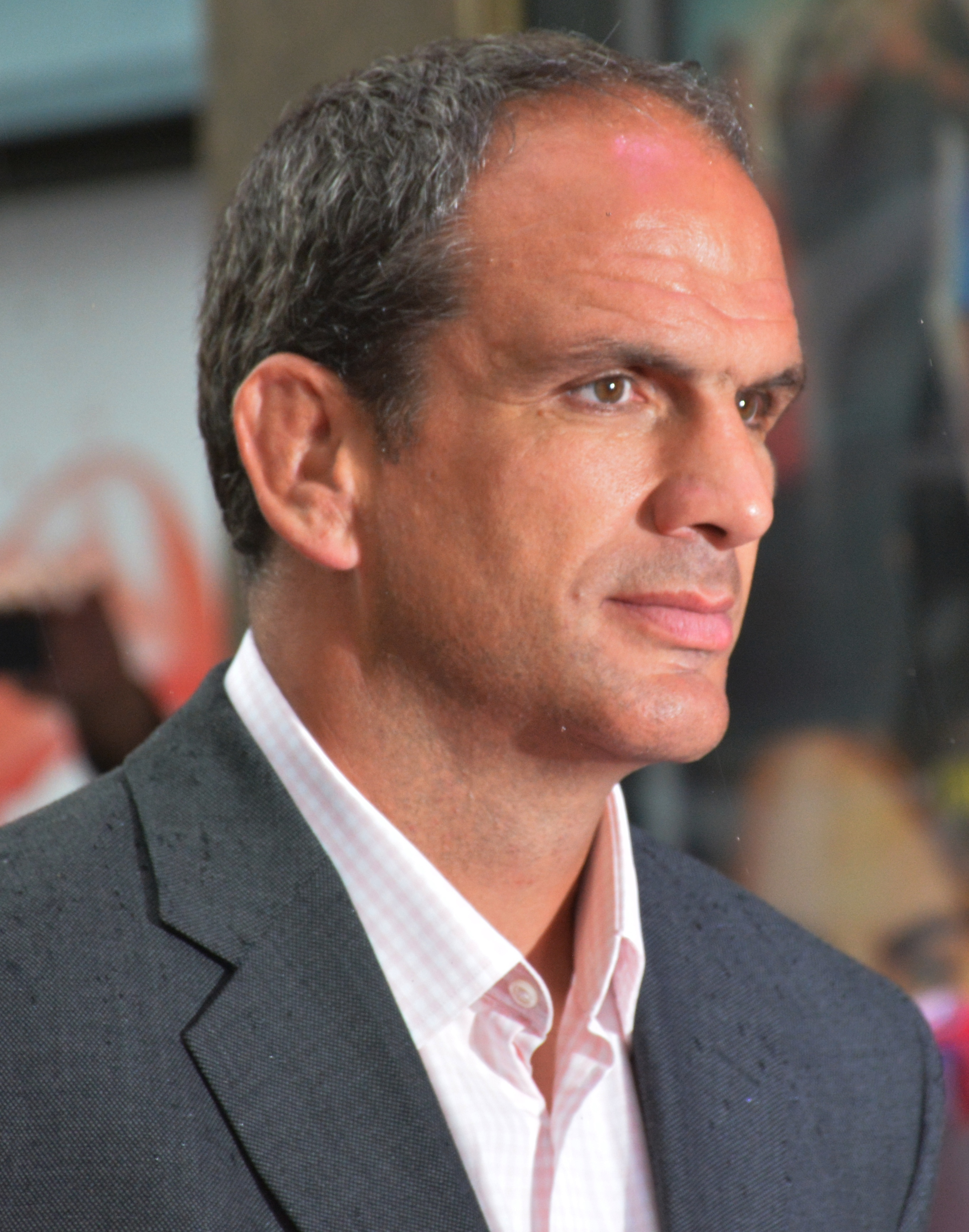
- Johnson in 2015
- Born: Martin Osborne Johnson; 9 March 1970 (age 56) Solihull, Warwickshire, England
- Height: 6 ft 7 in (2.01 m)
- Weight: 18 st 9 lb (119 kg)
- Notable relative: Will Johnson (brother)

Rugby union career
- Position: Lock
Senior career
Years	Team	Apps	(Points)
1989–2005	Leicester Tigers	362	(90)
1989–1990	King Country	25	(0)
1992	Barbarians	1	(0)
International career
Years	Team	Apps	(Points)
1987–1988	England U18s	8	(0)
1990	New Zealand U21s	3	(0)
1991	England U21s	1	(0)
1992–2000	England 'A'/'B'	9	(4)
1993–2003	England	84	(10)
1993, 1997, 2001	British & Irish Lions	8	(0)
1994–1999	England XV	4	(0)
Coaching career
- Years: Team
- 2008–2011: England

Martin Osborne Johnson CBE (born 9 March 1970) is an English retired rugby union player and coach. He played for and captained England, the British Lions and Leicester in a career spanning 16 seasons. He captained England to victory in the 2003 Rugby World Cup, and is regarded as one of the greatest locks ever to have played, and one of England's greatest ever players.

Johnson made his debut for Leicester Tigers in 1989 and in 1993 debuted for England as well as being a late call up to the 1993 British Lions tour to New Zealand. He was a try scorer in the final when Leicester won the 1993 Pilkington Cup and a member of the side which won the 1994-95 Courage League. Johnson was an ever-present as England won the Grand Slam in the 1995 Five Nations Championship. In 1997, he was named as captain for the victorious British Lions tour to South Africa, in 2001, he became the first man to captain the Lions twice as he led their 2001 tour to Australia.

He became England captain in 1999 and led the side in 39 matches, the third most ever. He was captain as England reached the quarter finals of the 1999 Rugby World Cup, won the Grand Slam in the 2003 Six Nations Championship and as England won the 2003 Rugby World Cup. The 2003 Rugby World Cup Final was his 84th and final international match.

During his club career he played 362 games for Leicester, his only senior club, and as well as the cup in 1993 and the league in 1995, he was also captain of the side as they won the 1997 Pilkington Cup and four consecutive Premiership titles between 1999–2002, and became the first team to retain the European Cup, winning in 2001 and 2002. His final season was in 2004–05.

On 1 July 2008 he became the England team manager. Under his management England won the 2011 Six Nations Championship, their first since 2003. He left the post in November 2011 following England's quarter final defeat at the 2011 Rugby World Cup and has not taken another management position in the game since.

== Early life ==
Johnson was born in Shirley, Solihull, the second of three brothers – his younger brother Will is a former back row forward for Leicester. At the age of seven, his family moved to Market Harborough, Leicestershire, where Martin attended Ridgeway Primary School, Welland Park School and Robert Smyth School.

== Early career ==
Johnson briefly played American football for the Leicester Panthers as a tight end or defensive end.

In 1989 he was approached by former All Black Colin Meads to try out for King Country in New Zealand. Johnson's trial run was successful and he played two seasons for King Country. In 1990 he was selected for the New Zealand under-21 side which went on a tour of Australia playing a team that included another future great lock forward, John Eales.

== Playing career ==
=== 1989-92: Club debut and early seasons ===
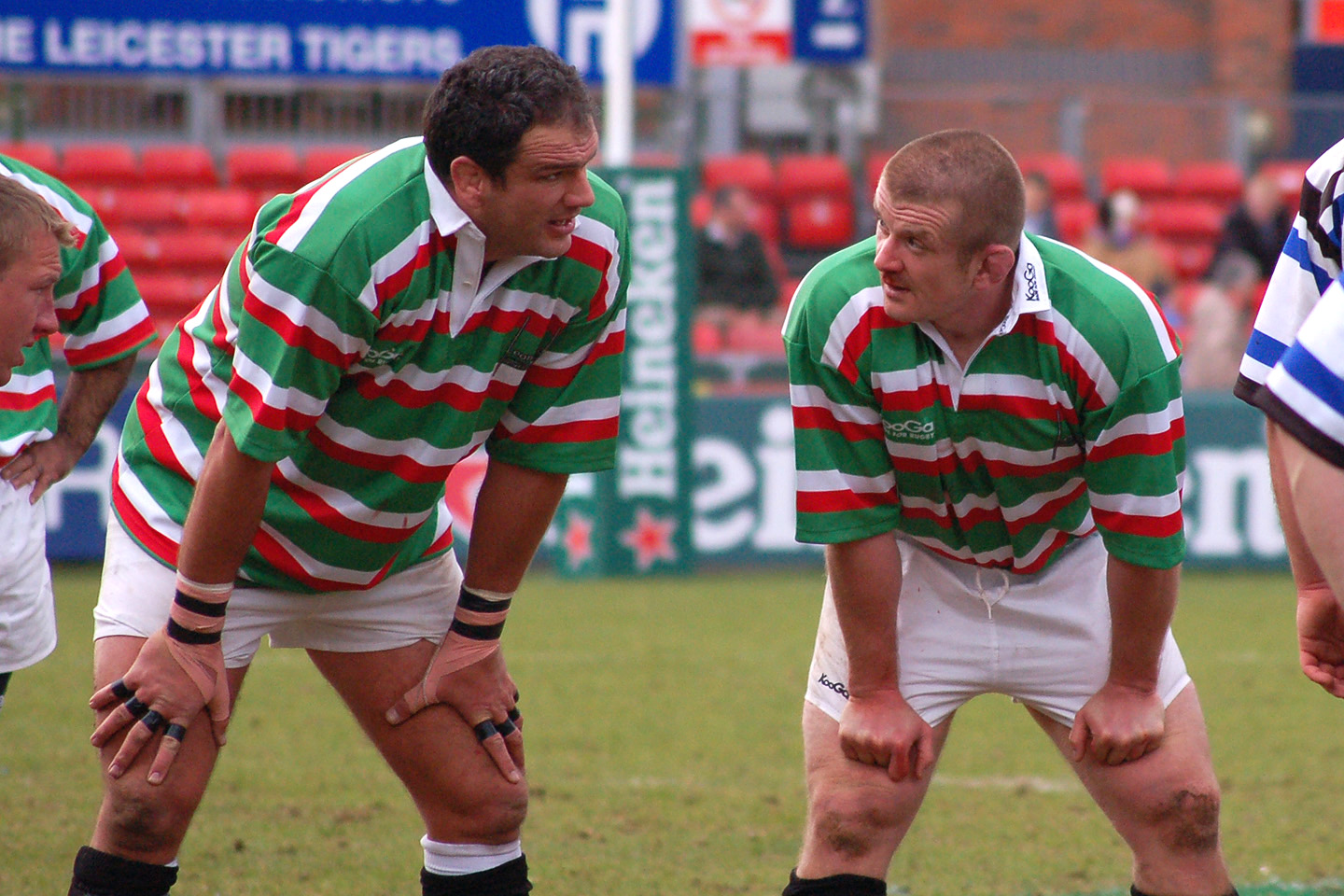
Martin Johnson and Graham Rowntree.

Johnson made his Leicester debut on 14 February 1989 against the Royal Air Force. His Courage League debut came against champions Bath at Welford Road; Tigers won 15–12 to deny Bath an undefeated season. Johnson did not feature for the first team again until 1990 as he played in New Zealand. His return to the first team was again against Bath; on 15 November 1990, due to an injury to Alex Gissing, Johnson started in the third round of 1990-91 Pilkington Cup and Tigers won, the first cup game that Bath had lost at The Rec since 1982. In 1990, Johnson moved to New Zealand to play for King Country and was selected to play for the Under 21 All Blacks.

A recurrence of a shoulder injury limited Johnson to just 5 games for Leicester in the 1990–91 season, though he did make his divisional debut for the Midlands. Johnson returned to action in August 1991 as Leicester toured Canada, but Gissing was still preferred for the early season club matches. Johnson established himself in the side in early 1991 playing 11 consecutive games from October onward and only missing 5 of the next 26 matches. Although he made his Leicester debut in the same season, 1988–89, as fellow lock Matt Poole, the pair did not start a game together until 5 November 1991 against Cambridge University. They went on to play together 129 times, a club record for a second row partnership.

=== 1992-93: Cup success, England and Lions debut ===
Johnson was now firmly established in Leicester's first choice line up. He played every game in the 1992–93 Pilkington Cup as Tigers defeated London Scottish, Nottingham, Exeter and Northampton to set up a final at Twickenham against Harlequins. Johnson scored Leicester's second try, after taking the ball from a tap penalty 5 meters out, as Leicester won 23–16.

He made his test debut against France in the opening game of the 1993 Five Nations Championship on 16 January 1993. He was due to play in an England 'A' game when he was unexpectedly summoned to Twickenham to replace the injured Wade Dooley. With only a 20-minute line-out session with his new teammates before the game, Johnson was thrown into the deep end. An early clash of heads with French prop Laurent Seigne left Johnson concussed, but he continued to play as England won 16–15. Johnson did not feature again for England in the Five Nations that season but was called up for an uncapped tour to Canada. After featuring in England's loss to Canada he was called up, again as a replacement for Dooley, for the 1993 British Lions tour to New Zealand. Johnson played in the final two tests against New Zealand.

=== 1993-95: First League title, Grand Slam and Rugby World Cup ===
In 1993–94 season Johnson again was an ever-present in Tigers run to the cup final but this time Leicester fell short to rivals Bath, losing 21–9. Leicester were also runners up in the league to Bath, Johnson played in 15 of Leicester's 18 matches.

Johnson won the first of his five league titles in 1995. That season the league was played in two main blocks with sporadic fixtures in between; the first 9 games were played on consecutive weekends from 10 September 1994 to 5 November 1994, two games were played in January 1995, one in February 1995 and one at the beginning of March 1995 before finishing with 5 games in 6 weeks from 25 March to 29 April. Johnson played in all 9 games in the first period as Tigers won 7, drew against Bath away, and lost to Bristol to leave them 2nd in the table. Against Orrell on 14 January 1995 Johnson captained Leicester for the first time, regular captain Dean Richards and vice captain John Wells being unavailable. Tigers won 29–19.

He was ever-present in the England side that won the 1995 Grand Slam. Preparations for the 1995 Rugby World Cup, which started in May, were deemed all important so Johnson, along with England colleague Rory Underwood, missed Leicester's February league match against Gloucester where Leicester slipped to a second defeat. Johnson returned for the matches against West Hartlepool, which saw Leicester go top, and the crucial wins against Bath and Sale. England duties meant he missed the last game of the season against Bristol which clinched the title.

Johnson was again an ever-present in England's 1995 Rugby World Cup Campaign, featuring in group stage wins against Argentina, Italy and Samoa as well as the quarter final against Australia, the losing semi-final against New Zealand and the third place play off against France.

=== 1995-97: Professionalism and near misses ===
Open professionalism was declared in August 1995, though a moratorium was declared by the RFU until the next season. After interest from Sale, Richmond and Newcastle Johnson signed his first professional contract with Leicester in 1996, a 5-year deal worth "six figures" per year. Johnson gave up his job with Midland Bank.

The 1995–96 season was another of just missing out to perennial rivals Bath. Bath clinched the league on the final day of the season; despite Bath only drawing at home with Sale, Tigers were unable to beat Harlequins at Welford Road, losing 21–19. Bath secured a league and cup double after defeating Leicester in the Cup Final.

Dean Richards was still the club captain in 1996–97 but age and injury limited him to 23 starts, in his place Rory Underwood captained 5 of the first 9 games before Johnson became the regular stand in captain. He led the side in the short lived Anglo-Welsh League against Bridgend then again in Leicester's Heineken Cup debut against Leinster at Donnybrook. Johnson was an ever-present in Leicester's side as they reached the 1997 Heineken Cup Final in Cardiff; Leicester beat Leinster, Scottish Borders, Pau and Llanelli in the group stage before beating Harlequins (quarter finals) and Toulouse (semi finals) to set up the final against Brive. The match was close at half time, Leicester were behind 8-6 but the French side ran riot in the second half to win 28–9.

That season Johnson captained Leicester in 12 matches including the 1997 Pilkington Cup Final, which Leicester won beating Sale 9–3 in the final. Johnson captained Leicester in the 6th Round against Bath then again in the quarter finals and semi finals.

=== Lions Tour 1997 ===
Johnson was selected to captain the 1997 British Lions tour of South Africa. The Lions convincingly won the first test at Newlands 25–16 with Neil Jenkins kicking five penalties and Matt Dawson and Alan Tait scoring tries. Despite scoring three tries in the second test at Durban, the Springboks suffered from some poor goal kicking and failed to land any penalties or conversions, while for the Lions Neil Jenkins kicked five penalties to level the scores at 15–15 before Jeremy Guscott dropped a goal for an 18–15 lead for the Lions. The Lions then held off a ferocious South African fightback to win the match 18–15 and take the series. The third test at Ellis Park was won by South Africa 35–16.

=== 1997-2000: Domestic success ===
Johnson was formally appointed Leicester's captain in 1997. The season started with the Heineken Cup and Leicester secured a quarter final play off after finishing second in their group containing Leinster, Toulouse and Amatori Milan. Tigers beat the Italian side twice but lost away to Leinster and at home to Toulouse. In the quarter final play off Leicester beat Glasgow 90-19 but lost in the quarter final proper away to Pau. Domestically Tigers were a mixed bag, winning 12, losing 8 and drawing 2 games to finish 4th in the Allied Dunbar Premiership.

Following a dispute between the English clubs and European Cup organisers there was no English involvement in the 1998–99 Heineken Cup; this led to an expanded Premiership of 14 clubs and 28 games. Tigers started the new season well with a 49–15 win against Harlequins and wins against London Scottish, Northampton and Bedford to see Tigers top the table at the end of September. Losses against Saracens and London Irish in rounds 5 & 7 saw Tigers slip to 3rd in October; Leicester regained the lead in the table after victories against Richmond and West Hartlepool and were never to lose it despite a loss to Wasps two weeks later. Dreams of the double were dashed by Richmond in the quarter finals of the cup, Johnson received a white card (at the time signifying 10 minutes in the sin bin) and during his absence the Londoners scored their two tries in a 15–13 win. The next week Johnson was sin binned again, this time in a league match against closest challengers Northampton, but even with Pat Howard also sin binned and Leicester down to 13 men for a period so outstanding was Johnson's play they won 22–15. Mathematically Johnson's second English championship title was sealed in the penultimate match of the season away to Newcastle Falcons. Johnson's form was such that he was named as the Premiership's Player of the Season.

By now appointed England captain, Johnson missed the start of the 1999-2000 Premiership season due to the 1999 Rugby World Cup. He returned in the 7th game of the season a 12-all draw against Newcastle that left Leicester in 4th position. Johnson then missed much of the season, including the start of the Six Nations, with an Achilles tendon injury. Returning to the first team against Bedford in March Johnson captained Leicester in the last 9 games of the league season as Leicester retained their Premiership crown.

=== 2001 & 2002: European Champion ===
Tigers were drawn with Pau, Glasgow and Pontypridd in their Heineken Cup pool. Johnson played in the first four games of the group; wins at home to Pau and away to Glasgow before a loss in Wales to Pontypridd that was quickly avenged a week later at Welford Road. On 9 November 2000 Johnson was one of only three then current players named in Leicester's Team of the Century.

Johnson missed the final two pool games and the quarter final against Swansea due to a 5-week ban picked up against Saracens in the Tetley's Bitter Cup quarter final. Domestically Leicester were again top of the table and at this stage 11 points clear of Northampton in second place. The gap was pushed to 18 points on 10 March 2001 when Tigers beat Northampton at Franklin's Gardens and Johnson's fourth English league title was formally sealed on 17 March 2001.

With the domestic title won, Johnson led Leicester into the Heineken Cup semi finals against Gloucester. Leon Lloyd's try gave Leicester a 19–15 win, despite Johnson spending time in the sin bin, to set up the final in the Parc des Princes against Stade Français Paris. In the final Johnson was again sin binned, for punching Christophe Juillet, but Tigers prevailed winning 34–30 to secure the club's first continental title. Tigers had won the inaugural Premeriship playoffs the week before so also sealed an unprecedented treble.

Leicester became the first side to retain a European title after beating Munster in 2002. Johnson also led Leicester in retaining their Premiership title. Returning from the 2001 Lions tour Johnson was rested for the first game of the Premiership season and was kept on the bench for a further two games, not playing until 22 September 2001 against Bath. The next two weeks he started Leicester's Heineken Cup pool games against Llanelli and Calvisano but shortly after picked up the injury that would keep him out of England's rearranged Six Nations game with Ireland.

Johnson returned to fitness to see Leicester through to the Heineken Cup semi finals against Llanelli but as with the season before missed mid-season matches due to a ban picked up in a game against Saracens. The ban was controversial as it was felt that the RFU did not have the right to hold the hearing, the incident having been seen and dealt with by way of a sin bin at the time, and that having then decided to ban Johnson he was only banned for Leicester game becoming available once England's games resumed.

Johnson returned to Leicester after the Six Nations and helped Leicester secure their fourth successive title against Newcastle on 13 April 2002 at Welford Road. Two weeks later Johnson captained Leicester as they traveled to Nottingham's City Ground for the Heineken Cup semi final against Llanelli. Tigers won thanks to a Tim Stimpson penalty which hit both the post and the cross bar before going through the posts. Tigers won the final 15–9 against Munster.

=== 2003 Rugby World Cup and Grand Slam ===
The 2003 international season started with the 2003 Six Nations Championship. Johnson featured in four of England's five games, wins against France, Wales, Scotland and the Grand Slam decider against Ireland. This success, the first England Grand Slam since 1995, was followed by a successful 2 match tour to New Zealand and Australia. England's first match was a 15–13 win over New Zealand, during which the 6-man England scrum held off sustained pressure to clinch England's first win over the All Blacks in New Zealand since 1973. During the match, Johnson told his comrades in the scrum to "get down and shove". In England's second match, a 20–17 victory over Australia, Johnson also performed well, leading the former Australian captain, John Eales, to commend his display as 'among the best ever by a lock forward'.

England took this form into the 2003 World Cup, where they won crucial matches against South Africa, Wales and France, beating Australia in the final to win the cup with an extra time drop goal.

=== 2003-05: Final Seasons ===
Johnson continued to play for Leicester until 2005. Johnson announced that 2004-05 was to be his final season. Tigers topped the table and went straight to the 2005 Premiership Final against Wasps, but lost 39–14. In the European Cup Leicester won away against Leinster in the quarter finals but were defeated by Toulose 27–19 at the Walkers Stadium.

== Awards ==
Johnson was awarded the Officer of the Most Excellent Order of the British Empire (OBE) in 1997 following his success in captaining the victorious 1997 British Lions tour to South Africa.

After the 2003 Rugby World Cup victory he was awarded the Commander of the Most Excellent Order of the British Empire (CBE) in the 2004 New Year honours and was second in the BBC Sports Personality of the Year awards behind Jonny Wilkinson. Johnson's testimonial match, held at Twickenham on 4 June 2005, also marked the return of All Black Jonah Lomu after a kidney transplant. Johnson's XV defeated Lomu's 33–29.

On 24 October 2011, at the IRB Awards in Auckland, Johnson was inducted into the IRB Hall of Fame alongside all other Rugby World Cup-winning captains and head coaches from the tournament's inception in 1987 to 2007 (except the previously-inducted John Eales).

== England head coach ==
Johnson was appointed England team manager in April 2008. England started the 2008 Autumn internationals by beating the Pacific Islands 39–13. That was followed with a loss to Australia, then a 42–6 defeat to South Africa and then another loss this time 32–6 against New Zealand at Twickenham.

England had four wins under Johnson going into 2009; in the 2009 Six Nations Championship they beat Italy 36–11, France 34–10 and Scotland 26–12 but were defeated by Ireland by 14–13 and to Wales by 23–15.

In the 2010 Six Nations England won their first two games against Wales and Italy, losing against Ireland, drawing with Scotland and losing their final game against France, allowing the French to win a Grand Slam.

In 2011, Johnson led a new-look England side to win the 2011 Six Nations title, thanks to wins over Wales, Italy, France and Scotland, though a 24–8 loss to Ireland on the final weekend of the competition denied them the Grand Slam. He resigned on 16 November 2011 following England's poor performance and controversial behaviour at the 2011 Rugby World Cup in New Zealand.

=== International matches as head coach ===
World Rankings column shows the world ranking England was placed at on the following Monday after each of their matches

Matches (2008–2011)
Match	Date	Opposition	Venue	Score (Eng.–Opponent)	Competition	Captain	World Rank
2008
1	14 June	New Zealand	Eden Park, Auckland	20–37	New Zealand test series	Steve Borthwick	5th
2	21 June	New Zealand	Lancaster Park, Christchurch	12–44	New Zealand test series	Steve Borthwick	5th
3	8 November	Pacific Islanders	Twickenham, London	39–13	Autumn internationals	Steve Borthwick	4th
4	15 November	Australia	Twickenham, London	14–28	Autumn internationals	Steve Borthwick	5th
5	22 November	South Africa	Twickenham, London	6–42	Autumn internationals	Steve Borthwick	5th
6	29 November	New Zealand	Twickenham, London	6–32	Autumn internationals	Steve Borthwick	6th
2009
7	7 February	Italy	Twickenham, London	36–11	2009 Six Nations	Steve Borthwick	6th
8	14 February	Wales	Millennium Stadium, Cardiff	15–23	2009 Six Nations	Steve Borthwick	7th
9	28 February	Ireland	Croke Park, Dublin	13–14	2009 Six Nations	Steve Borthwick	8th
10	15 March	France	Twickenham, London	34–10	2009 Six Nations	Steve Borthwick	7th
11	21 March	Scotland	Twickenham, London	26–12	2009 Six Nations	Steve Borthwick	6th
12	6 June	Argentina	Old Trafford, Manchester	37–15	Argentina test series	Steve Borthwick	5th
13	13 June	Argentina	Padre Ernesto Martearena, Salta	22–24	Argentina test series	Steve Borthwick	7th
14	7 November	Australia	Twickenham, London	9–18	Autumn internationals	Steve Borthwick	8th
15	14 November	Argentina	Twickenham, London	16–9	Autumn internationals	Steve Borthwick	6th
16	21 November	New Zealand	Twickenham, London	6–19	Autumn internationals	Steve Borthwick	7th
2010
17	6 February	Wales	Twickenham, London	30–17	2010 Six Nations	Steve Borthwick	6th
18	14 February	Italy	Stadio Flaminio, Rome	17–12	2010 Six Nations	Steve Borthwick	6th
19	27 February	Ireland	Twickenham, London	16–20	2010 Six Nations	Steve Borthwick	6th
20	13 March	Scotland	Murrayfield, Edinburgh	15–15	2010 Six Nations	Steve Borthwick	7th
21	20 March	France	Stade de France, Paris	10–12	2010 Six Nations	Steve Borthwick	7th
22	12 June	Australia	Subiaco Oval, Perth	17–27	Australia test series	Lewis Moody	6th
23	19 June	Australia	Stadium Australia, Sydney	21–20	Australia test series	Lewis Moody	6th
24	6 November	New Zealand	Twickenham, London	16–26	Autumn internationals	Lewis Moody	5th
25	13 November	Australia	Twickenham, London	35–18	Autumn internationals	Lewis Moody	4th
26	20 November	Samoa	Twickenham, London	23–13	Autumn internationals	Nick Easter	4th
27	27 November	South Africa	Twickenham, London	11–21	Autumn internationals	Lewis Moody	4th
2011
28	4 February	Wales	Millennium Stadium, Cardiff	26–19	2011 Six Nations	Mike Tindall	4th
29	12 February	Italy	Twickenham, London	59–13	2011 Six Nations	Mike Tindall	5th
30	26 February	France	Twickenham, London	17–9	2011 Six Nations	Mike Tindall	4th
31	13 March	Scotland	Twickenham, London	22–16	2011 Six Nations	Mike Tindall	4th
32	19 March	Ireland	Croke Park, Dublin	8–24	2011 Six Nations	Nick Easter	5th
33	6 August	Wales	Twickenham, London	23–19	2011 RWC warm-ups	Lewis Moody	4th
34	13 August	Wales	Millennium Stadium, Cardiff	9–19	2011 RWC warm-ups	Mike Tindall	5th
35	27 August	Ireland	Aviva Stadium, Dublin	20–9	2011 RWC warm-ups	Mike Tindall	5th
36	10 September	Argentina	Forsyth Barr Stadium, Dunedin	13–9	2011 Rugby World Cup	Mike Tindall	4th
37	18 September	Georgia	Forsyth Barr Stadium, Dunedin	41–10	2011 Rugby World Cup	Lewis Moody	4th
38	24 September	Romania	Forsyth Barr Stadium, Dunedin	67–3	2011 Rugby World Cup	Lewis Moody	4th
39	1 October	Scotland	Eden Park, Auckland	16–12	2011 Rugby World Cup	Lewis Moody	4th
40	8 October	France	Eden Park, Auckland	12–19	2011 Rugby World Cup	Lewis Moody	6th

=== Record by country ===
Opponent	Played	Won	Drawn	Lost	Win ratio (%)	For	Against
Argentina	4	3	0	1	75	88	57
Australia	5	2	0	3	40	96	111
France	4	2	0	2	50	73	50
Georgia	1	1	0	0	100	41	10
Ireland	4	1	0	3	25	57	67
Italy	3	3	0	0	100	112	36
New Zealand	5	0	0	5	0	60	158
Pacific Islanders	1	1	0	0	100	39	13
Romania	1	1	0	0	100	67	3
Samoa	1	1	0	0	100	23	13
Scotland	4	3	1	0	75	79	55
South Africa	2	0	0	2	0	17	63
Wales	5	3	0	2	60	103	97
TOTAL	40	21	1	18	53	855	733

== Personal life ==
Martin Johnson comes from a sporting family. His great-grandfather was a wrestler, and his brother Will also played over 200 games for Leicester, often alongside Martin. His mother was a long distance runner and taught Physical Education at secondary school.

He published his autobiography in December 2003 with Headline.

A fan of American football, Johnson is a supporter of the San Francisco 49ers and worked as a studio analyst for ITV at Super Bowl XLI, and also for BBC Sport at Super Bowl XLVII. He then worked as a studio analyst for BBC Sport during their coverage of the 2018 Six Nations Championship.

== Honours ==
=== As a player ===
Leicester

- Premiership (5): 1994–95, 1998–99, 1999-2000, 2000–01, 2001–02
- Heineken Cup (2): 2001, 2002
- Pilkington Cup (2): 1993, 1997

England

- Six Nations Championship:
  - Winner (5): 1995, 1996, 2000, 2001, 2003
- Grand Slam:
  - Winner (2): 1995, 2003
- Triple Crown:
  - Winner (6): 1995, 1996, 1997, 1998, 2002, 2003
- World Cup:
  - Winner (1): 2003

Lions

- New Zealand tour 1993 as replacement, losing 2–1
- South African tour 1997 as captain, winning 2–1
- Australia tour 2001 as captain, losing 2–1

=== As a manager ===
England

- Six Nations
  - Winners: 2011
  - Runners-up: 2009
- Calcutta Cup
  - Winners: 2009, 2010, 2011
- Cook Cup
  - Winners: 2010

== Playing statistics ==
=== Club career ===
Appearances and tries by club, season, and competition
Club	Season	League			Cup		Europe		Other		Total		Ref
Club	Season	Division	Apps	Tries	Apps	Tries	Apps	Tries	Apps	Tries	Apps	Tries	Ref
Leicester Tigers	1988–89	Courage League	1	0	0	0	—		1	0	2	0	
Leicester Tigers	1989–90	Courage League	0	0	0	0	—		0	0	0	0	
Leicester Tigers	1990–91	Courage League	0	0	1	0	—		4	0	5	0	
Leicester Tigers	1991–92	Courage League	9	0	4	0	—		12	0	25	0	
Leicester Tigers	1992–93	Courage League	9	0	5	1	—		7	1	21	2	
Leicester Tigers	1993–94	Courage League	15	0	5	0	—		2	1	22	1	
Leicester Tigers	1994–95	Courage League	15	2	3	0	—		0	0	18	2	
Leicester Tigers	1995–96	Courage League	17	0	5	1	—		3	0	25	1	
Leicester Tigers	1996–97	Courage League	20	0	4	0	7	0	4	0	35	0	
Leicester Tigers	1997–98	Premiership	21	1	2	0	8	1	0	0	31	2	
Leicester Tigers	1998–99	Premiership	24	1	2	0	—		2	0	28	1	
Leicester Tigers	1999–2000	Premiership	10	0	0	0	3	0	2	1	15	1	
Leicester Tigers	2000–01	Premiership	20	3	3	0	6	0	1	0	30	3	
Leicester Tigers	2001–02	Premiership	14	2	1	0	7	0	0	0	22	2	
Leicester Tigers	2002–03	Premiership	22	0	3	0	6	0	1	0	32	0	
Leicester Tigers	2003–04	Premiership	14	0	0	0	6	1	0	0	20	1	
Leicester Tigers	2004–05	Premiership	22	2	0	0	8	0	1	0	31	2	
Leicester Tigers	Total		233	11	38	2	51	2	40	3	362	18	

== Sources ==
- Farmer, Stuart; Hands, David (2014). Tigers – Official history of Leicester Football Club. The Rugby Development Foundation. ISBN 978-0-9930213-0-5.

Rugby Union Captain
Preceded by Matt Dawson; Lawrence Dallaglio; Matt Dawson; Neil Back; Phil Vickery; Jonny Wilkinson; Dorian West; Phil Vickery	England national rugby union team captain November 1998; June–October 1999; June 2000 – April 2001; November 2001 – March 2002; November 2002 – February 2003; March–June 2003; September–October 2003; November 2003	Succeeded by Lawrence Dallaglio; Matt Dawson; Kyran Bracken; Neil Back; Jonny Wilkinson; Jason Leonard; Phil Vickery; Lawrence Dallaglio
Preceded by Gavin Hastings himself	British & Irish Lions captain 1997; 2001	Succeeded by himself Brian O'Driscoll
Preceded by John Eales; Australia	Rugby World Cup winning captain 2003	Succeeded by John Smit; South Africa
Sporting positions
Preceded by Brian Ashton	England national rugby union team coach 2008–2011	Succeeded by Stuart Lancaster
