= 1996–97 Pilkington Cup =

English rugby union competition

Tournament statistics
- Champions: Leicester Tigers (5th title)

The 1996–97 Pilkington Cup was the 26th edition of England's premier rugby union club competition. Leicester won the competition defeating Sale in the final. The event was sponsored by Pilkington and the final was held at Twickenham Stadium.

== Draw and results ==
=== First round (Sep 14) ===
Team one	Team two	Score
Barking	Barnstaple	18-31
Birmingham & Solihull	Old Halesonians	37-8
Bishop Stortford	Bicester	13-26
Bradford & Bingley	Aspatria	13-26
Bridgwater & Albion	Newbury	22-46
Bridlington	Nuneaton	23-16
Camberley	Plymouth	24-24*
Camp Hill	Wigton	17-35
Charlton Park	Askeans	11-28
Derby	Blaydon	12-13
Esher	Ruislip	20-3
Gosport & Fareham	Weston-Super-Mare	12-19
Haywards Heath	Beckenham	31-10
Henley	Westcombe Park	84-10
Launceston	Cheltenham	25-37
Lichfield	Winnington Park	19-21
Longton	Sheffield	16-26
Manchester	Scunthorpe	37-10
Marlow	Norwich	0-6
Metropolitan Police	Sutton & Epsom	47-18
New Brighton	Hereford	29-13
North Walsham	Gloucester Old Boys	17-18
Preston Grasshoppers	Stoke-on-Trent	28-10
Southend	High Wycombe	24-41
Staines	Gloucester Saras	27-20
Stourbridge	Kendal	17-28
Sutton Coldfield	Sandal	15-22
Swanage & Wareham	Berry Hill	41-8
Tabard	Bracknell	19-30
Westleigh	Tynedale	19-20
Widnes	Ampthill	30-17
Worcester	Vale of Lune	59-8

=== Second round (Oct 12) ===
Team one	Team two	Score
Askeans	Swanage & Wareham	18-21
Barnstaple	Plymouth	27-14
Bishop Stortford	Metropolitan Police	22*-22
Bridlington	Blaydon	15-7
Cheltenham	Worcester	30-22
Gloucester Old Boys	Newbury	13-26
Haywards Heath	Bracknell	24-58
Manchester	Wigton	19-31
New Brighton	Preston Grasshoppers	12-24
Norwich	Esher	12-38
Sandal	Tynedale	16-9
Sheffield	Kendal	29-31
Staines	Henley	20-31
Weston-Super-Mare	High Wycombe	23-6
Widnes	Birmingham & Solihull	19-9
Winnington Park	Aspatria	19-46

Progressed to next round by virtue of scoring more tries*

=== Third round (Nov 2) ===
Team one	Team two	Score
Bridlington	Wigton	22-30
Cheltenham	Henley	23-19
Esher	Bracknell	26-15
Exeter	Barnstaple	32-3
Leeds	Redruth	96-6
Liverpool St Helens	Walsall	30-20
London Welsh	Reading	11-16
Morley	Aspatria	30-26
Newbury	Clifton	58-12
Otley	Wharfedale	34-27
Preston Grasshoppers	Fylde	24-12
Rosslyn Park	Havant	27-15
Sandal	Kendal	20-32
Swanage & Wareham	Lydney	9-26
Weston-super-Mare	Bishop Stortford	23-11
Widnes	Harrogate	12-7

=== Fourth round (Dec 21 & 22) ===
Team one	Team two	Score
Bath	London Irish	33-0
Bristol	Blackheath	60-17
Coventry	Kendal	79-17
Gloucester	Leeds	55-20
Harlequins	Cheltenham	47-11
Leicester	Newbury	26-21
Moseley	Wigton	49-6
Newcastle	West Hartlepool	51-10
Nottingham	London Scottish	11-25
Orrell	Bedford	34-31
Preston Grasshoppers	Northampton	11-40
Reading	Saracens	3-41
Rotherham	Rosslyn Park	41-26
Sale	Richmond	34-30
Wakefield	Waterloo	22-17
Wasps	Rugby	84-8

=== Fifth round (Jan 25 & 26) ===
Team one	Team two	Score
Bath	Leicester	28-39
Gloucester	Bristol	18-12
London Scottish	Newcastle	15-39
Northampton	Coventry	26-17
Orrell	Sale	0-57
Rotherham	Harlequins	23-42
Saracens	Wasps	21-17
Wakefield	Moseley	24-14

=== Quarter-finals (Feb 22 & 23) ===
Team one	Team two	Score
Harlequins	Saracens	28-21
Newcastle	Leicester	8-18
Northampton	Sale	9-22
Wakefield	Gloucester	21-25

=== Semi-finals (Mar 29) ===
Team one	Team two	Score
Gloucester	Leicester	13-26
Sale	Harlequins	26-16

=== Final ===
10 May 1997

Leicester	9–3	Sale
Pen: Joel Stransky 3		Pen: Simon Mannix

Twickenham Stadium, London
Attendance: 75,000
Referee: Brian Campsall (Yorkshire)

Leicester
Sale

O	(Ireland) Niall Malone
N	(Scotland) Craig Joiner
M	(England) Will Greenwood
L	(England) Stuart Potter
K	(England) Leon Lloyd
J	(South Africa) Joel Stransky
I	(England) Austin Healey
G	(Ireland) Eric Miller
H	(England) Neil Back
F	(England) John Wells
E	(England) Matt Poole
D	(England) Martin Johnson (c)
C	(England) Darren Garforth
B	(England) Richard Cockerill
A	(England) Graham Rowntree
Replacements:
P	(England) Rob Liley
Q	(England) Aadel Kardooni
R	(England) Bill Drake-Lee
S	(England) Dean Richards
T	(England) Dorian West
U	(England) Steve Hackney
Dir of Rugby:
(Australia) Bob Dwyer

15	(England) Jim Mallinder (c)
14	(England) David Rees
13	(England) Jos Baxendell
12	(England) Adrian Hadley
11	(England) Tom Beim
10	(New Zealand) Simon Mannix
9	(England) Dewi Morris
8	(New Zealand) John Mitchell
7	(Ireland) Dylan O'Grady
6	(England) Neil Ashurst
5	(England) Dave Baldwin
4	(England) Dave Erskine
3	(England) Paul Smith
2	(England) Steve Diamond
1	(England) Paul Winstanley
Replacements:
16	John O'Reilly
17	Chris Yates
18	Andy Morris
19	Sean Fletcher
20	Luke Hewson
21	Murray Driver
Coach:
