= 2010 England rugby union tour of Australasia =

- Coach: Martin Johnson
- Tour captain: Lewis Moody
Summary
| P | W | D | L |
Total
| 6 | 3 | 1 | 2 |
Test match
| 2 | 1 | 0 | 1 |
Opponent
| P | W | D | L |
Australia
| 2 | 1 | 0 | 1 |

Tour chronology
- ← New Zealand 2008 South Africa 2012 →

The England rugby team's tour of Australasia in the June 2010 saw the team play two tests against Australia, plus two mid-week games against the Australian Barbarians (essentially Australia A) and a final match against New Zealand Māori.

The tour was notable for England's 20–21 victory in the second test, which at that point was only the third time England had beaten Australia on their own soil – the other two occasions both being in 2003, one of which was the World Cup final.

== Matches ==
Scores and results list England's points tally first.

| Opposing team | For | Against | Date | Venue | Status | Report |
|---|---|---|---|---|---|---|
| Australian Barbarians | 28 | 28 | 08/06/2010 | Members Equity Stadium, Perth | Tour Match | BBC report |
| Australia | 17 | 27 | 12/06/2010 | Subiaco Oval, Perth | Test Match | BBC report |
| Australian Barbarians | 15 | 9 | 15/06/2010 | Central Coast Stadium, Gosford | Tour Match | BBC report |
| Australia | 21 | 20 | 19/06/2010 | ANZ Stadium, Sydney | Test Match | BBC report |
| New Zealand Māori | 28 | 35 | 23/06/2010 | McLean Park, Napier | Tour Match | BBC report |

== Touring party ==
- Manager: Martin Johnson
- Forwards coach: John Wells
- Attack coach: Brian Smith
- Defence coach: Mike Ford
- Scrum coach: Graham Rowntree
- Captain: Lewis Moody (Test matches)
- Man of Match 1st Test: Quade Cooper (Test matches)
- Man of Match 2nd Test: Nick Easter (Test matches)
