= Pat Howard =

Australian rugby player and coach

- Born: Patrick William Howard; 14 November 1973 (age 52) Sydney, Australia
- Height: 1.78 m (5 ft 10 in)
- Weight: 90 kg (14 st 2 lb)
- School: Marist College Ashgrove
- University: University of Queensland
- Notable relative(s): Jake Howard (Father); Cyril Towers (Grandfather)

Rugby union career
- Position(s): Centre, Fly-half
Senior career
Years	Team	Apps	(Points)
19??–1996	Queensland Reds		
1996–1998	ACT Brumbies		
1998–2001	Leicester Tigers	92	
2001–2002	ACT Brumbies		
2002–2004	Montferrand	22	
International career
Years	Team	Apps	(Points)
1993–1997	Australia	20	(10)
Coaching career
- Years: Team
- 2005–2007: Leicester Tigers

Patrick William Howard (born 14 November 1973) is an ex-head coach at Leicester Tigers and a former Australian rugby union international who played centre or fly-half. He was the General Manager, Team Performance – for the Australia national cricket team.

He was born in Sydney. His father Jake Howard played prop for Australia and his grandfather Cyril Towers also played centre for the Wallabies.

== Early life ==
He attended Marist College Ashgrove, Brisbane where he played 1st XV Rugby. He started his career playing for the University of Queensland Football club. Studying pharmacy at the university he was a recipient of a University of Queensland Sporting Scholarship.

== Playing and coaching career ==
Howard started his career in the amateur era playing for the Queensland Reds while at Queensland University, he made his international debut for Australia on 17 July 1993 against New Zealand at Carisbrook, Dunedin. In 1996 Howard signed for the ACT Brumbies in the inaugural Super 12 season. Howard made the last of his 20 test appearances on 22 November 1997 against Scotland at Murrayfield.

In 1998 he signed for Leicester Tigers, displacing Will Greenwood, who was forced to return to Harlequins for first team rugby. Howard became a pivotal part of the Tigers' championship winning side. Howard started the victorious 2001 Heineken Cup Final for Leicester.

After the departure of Joel Stransky in 2000, he was appointed as the Tigers' backs coach, however he had his sights set on regaining a Wallaby jersey ahead of the 2003 World Cup so rejoined the Brumbies in 2001, swapping his playing position with Rod Kafer. He was unable to make the squad for the World Cup and returned to Europe, playing for French side Montferrand for one season in 2003/04.

After retiring as a player at the end of the season in 2004, Howard returned to Leicester Tigers, once again becoming backs coach. In 2005 he was appointed as head coach succeeding John Wells.

He guided Tigers to the Guinness Premiership and EDF Energy Cup finals in 2007, winning the domestic double. They also made the final of the Heineken Cup but were denied an historic treble – succumbing to Wasps 25–9.

On 28 December 2006, he announced he would resign as coach of the Tigers at the end of the 2006/7 season. Marcelo Loffreda was named Howard's successor, who took up his new role after the 2007 Rugby World Cup.

== Cricket management career ==
Howard returned to his native Australia to manage his family's pharmacy company; however, he quickly became general manager of the Australian Rugby Union's high performance unit. He also worked as Chief Operations Officer at Cromwell Property Group prior to his move to rugby management.

On 13 October 2011, he was announced as the General Manager, Team Performance – for the Australian Cricket Team. This role, created to focus solely on team performance, was one of the key recommendations of the Don Argus led Australian Team Performance Review adopted by Cricket Australia's Board in August.

Howard has received some criticism for this role. Shane Warne said in 2013, Cricket Australia should "please put current cricket people in charge to run the game, select teams, not ex rugby or any other sports people" and called Howard a "muppet".

In March 2013, following being temporarily dropped from the national team Shane Watson said Howard had not been involved in cricket long enough to pass comment on his commitment to the Australian team.

Howard has been given credit by James Sutherland for assisting the growth in opportunities for women cricketers in Australia.
