= 1999–2000 Heineken Cup pool stage =

- Season: 1999–2000 Heineken Cup
- Date: 19 November 1999 – 16 January 2000

Qualifiers
- Seed 1: (France) Toulouse
- Seed 2: (England) Northampton Saints
- Seed 3: (Ireland) Munster
- Seed 4: (Wales) Llanelli
- Seed 5: (Wales) Cardiff
- Seed 6: (France) Stade Français
- Seed 7: (England) London Wasps
- Seed 8: (France) Montferrand

In the 1999–2000 Heineken Cup pool stage matches, teams received

- 2 points for a win
- 1 point for a draw

== Pool 1 ==
Team	P	W	D	L	Tries for	Tries against	Try diff	Points for	Points against	Points diff	Pts
(France) Stade Français	6	4	0	2	22	9	13	192	109	83	8
(Ireland) Leinster	6	4	0	2	12	17	−5	150	138	12	8
(Scotland) Glasgow Rugby	6	2	0	4	14	23	−9	130	179	−49	4
(England) Leicester Tigers	6	2	0	4	12	11	1	127	173	−46	4

19 November 1999
19:30

Leinster (Ireland)	27–20	(England) Leicester Tigers

Donnybrook
Attendance: 6,500

21 November 1999
15:00

Stade Français (France)	37–18	(Scotland) Glasgow

Stade Jean-Bouin
Attendance: 5,000

26 November 1999
19:30

Glasgow (Scotland)	29–17	(Ireland) Leinster

Attendance: 1,800

27 November 1999
15:00

Leicester Tigers (England)	30–25	(France) Stade Français

Welford Road
Attendance: 13,188

12 December 1999
15:00

Stade Français (France)	39–6	(Ireland) Leinster

Stade Jean-Bouin
Attendance: 3,424

12 December 1999
15:15

Glasgow (Scotland)	30–17	(England) Leicester Tigers

Attendance: 4,120

17 December 1999
17:30

Leinster (Ireland)	24–23	(France) Stade Français

Donnybrook
Attendance: 3,000

18 December 1999
15:00

Leicester Tigers (England)	34–21	(Scotland) Glasgow

Welford Road
Attendance: 9,801

7 January 2000
18:30

Leinster (Ireland)	44–17	(Scotland) Glasgow

Donnybrook
Attendance: 5,000

8 January 2000
18:00

Stade Français (France)	38–16	(England) Leicester Tigers

Stade Jean-Bouin
Attendance: 8,000

14 January 2000
19:30

Glasgow (Scotland)	15–30	(France) Stade Français

Attendance: 4,120

15 January 2000
15:00

Leicester Tigers (England)	10–32	(Ireland) Leinster

Welford Road
Attendance: 12,458

== Pool 2 ==
Team	P	W	D	L	Tries for	Tries against	Try diff	Points for	Points against	Points diff	Pts
(France) Toulouse	6	5	0	1	24	5	19	200	73	127	10
(England) Bath	6	4	0	2	15	8	7	170	80	90	8
(Wales) Swansea	6	3	0	3	14	13	1	126	137	−11	6
(Italy) Safilo Petraca Rugby Padova	6	0	0	6	11	38	−27	76	282	−206	0

20 November 1999
14:30

Swansea (Wales)	66–19	(Italy) Petrarca

St. Helen's
Attendance: 4,000

20 November 1999
15:00

Bath (England)	25–32	(France) Toulouse

Recreation Ground
Attendance: 8,235

27 November 1999
14:30

Petrarca (Italy)	15–56	(England) Bath

Stadio Plebiscito
Attendance: 1,500

27 November 1999
20:00

Toulouse (France)	46–3	(Wales) Swansea

Les Sept Deniers
Attendance: 10,000

10 December 1999
19:15

Swansea (Wales)	10–9	(England) Bath

St. Helen's
Attendance: 3,000

11 December 1999
14:30

Petrarca (Italy)	17–39	(France) Toulouse

Stadio Plebiscito
Attendance: 1,500

18 December 1999
15:00

Toulouse (France)	51–0	(Italy) Petrarca

Les Sept Deniers
Attendance: 6,000

11 January 2000
19:30

Bath (England)	20–9	(Wales) Swansea

Recreation Ground
Attendance: 7,000

7 January 2000
19:10

Swansea (Wales)	9–18	(France) Toulouse

St. Helen's
Attendance: 4,500

8 January 2000
14:15

Bath (England)	41–0	(Italy) Petrarca

Recreation Ground
Attendance: 7,136

15 January 2000
14:30

Petrarca (Italy)	25–29	(Wales) Swansea

Stadio Plebiscito
Attendance: 800

15 January 2000
15:20

Toulouse (France)	14–19	(England) Bath

Stade Municipal
Attendance: 22,000

== Pool 3 ==
Team	P	W	D	L	Tries for	Tries against	Try diff	Points for	Points against	Points diff	Pts
(Wales) Llanelli	6	5	0	1	17	8	9	152	86	66	10
(England) Wasps	6	5	0	1	16	9	7	163	99	64	10
(France) Bourgoin	6	2	0	4	14	14	0	140	162	−22	4
(Ireland) Ulster	6	0	0	6	4	20	−16	71	179	−108	0

20 November 1999
19:30

Bourgoin (France)	26 – 12	(Ireland) Ulster
Try: Balue, Glas; Con: Péclier (2); Pen: Péclier (4)	Report	Pen: Mason 4

Stade Pierre Rajon
Attendance: 7,000

21 November 1999
14:15

London Wasps (England)	22–13	(Wales) Llanelli

Loftus Road
Attendance: 6,000

26 November 1999
19:30

Ulster (Ireland)	6 – 19	(England) London Wasps
Pen: Mason (2)	Report	Try: Green; Con: Logan; Pen: Logan (4)

Ravenhill
Attendance: 12,000

27 November 1999
14:30

Llanelli (Wales)	29–10	(France) Bourgoin

Stradey Park
Attendance: 3,500

10 December 1999
19:30

Ulster (Ireland)	6 – 29	(Wales) Llanelli
Pen: Mason (2)	Report	Try: Wyatt, Finua; Con: Jones (2); Pen: Jones (5)

Ravenhill
Attendance: 8,000
Referee: Steve Lander

11 December 1999
17:00

Bourgoin (France)	15–21	(England) London Wasps

Stade Pierre Rajon
Attendance: 6,000

18 December 1999
14:40

Llanelli (Wales)	20 – 3	(Ireland) Ulster
Try: Wyatt, Davies; Con: Jones (2); Pen: Jones (2)	Report	Pen: Mason

Stradey Park
Attendance: 3,000

19 December 1999
15:00

London Wasps (England)	37–23	(France) Bourgoin

Loftus Road
Attendance: 4,123

8 January 2000
18:00

Bourgoin (France)	30–36	(Wales) Llanelli

Stade Pierre Rajon
Attendance: 3,000

9 January 2000
15:00

London Wasps (England)	49 – 17	(Ireland) Ulster
Try: Logan (2), Reed, Henderson, King, Shelbourne, Scrace	Report	Try: Humphreys, Mason; Con: Mason (2); Pen: Mason

Loftus Road
Attendance: 5,000

14 January 2000
19:30

Ulster (Ireland)	27 – 36	(France) Bourgoin
Try: Howe (2); Con: Mason; Pen: Mason (5)	Report	Try: Boyet, Coux (2), Glas, Raschi; Drop: Boyet

Ravenhill
Attendance: 6,000

15 January 2000
15:00

Llanelli (Wales)	25–15	(England) London Wasps

Stradey Park
Attendance: 10,000

== Pool 4 ==
Team	P	W	D	L	Tries for	Tries against	Try diff	Points for	Points against	Points diff	Pts
(Ireland) Munster	6	5	0	1	19	14	5	188	132	56	10
(England) Saracens	6	3	0	3	24	15	9	206	153	53	6
(France) Colomiers	6	2	0	4	13	20	−7	144	194	−50	4
(Wales) Pontypridd	6	2	0	4	13	20	−7	106	165	−59	4

20 November 1999
14:30

Munster (Ireland)	32–10	(Wales) Pontypridd
	Report

Thomond Park
Attendance: 6,500

21 November 1999
15:15

Colomiers (France)	19–16	(England) Saracens

Stade Selery
Attendance: 8,000

26 November 1999
19:10

Pontypridd (Wales)	22–14	(France) Colomiers

Sardis Road
Attendance: 6,528

28 November 1999
15:00

Saracens (England)	34–35	(Ireland) Munster
	Report

Vicarage Road
Attendance: 4,000

11 December 1999
15:00

Colomiers (France)	15–31	(Ireland) Munster
	Report

Attendance: 4,000

12 December 1999
15:00

Saracens (England)	52–35	(Wales) Pontypridd

Vicarage Road
Attendance: 5,823

17 December 1999
19:10

Pontypridd (Wales)	18–22	(England) Saracens

Sardis Road
Attendance: 3,500

18 December 1999
14:30

Munster (Ireland)	23–5	(France) Colomiers
	Report

Musgrave Park
Attendance: 8,500

8 January 2000
15:30

Munster (Ireland)	31–30	(England) Saracens
	Report

Thomond Park
Attendance: 10,000

9 January 2000
15:00

Colomiers (France)	38–21	(Wales) Pontypridd

Attendance: 14,000

15 January 2000
14:30

Pontypridd (Wales)	38–36	(Ireland) Munster
	Report

Sardis Road
Attendance: 5,000

16 January 2000
15:00

Saracens (England)	52–15	(France) Colomiers

Vicarage Road
Attendance: 5,650

== Pool 5 ==
Team	P	W	D	L	Tries for	Tries against	Try diff	Points for	Points against	Points diff	Pts
(Wales) Cardiff	6	4	1	1	14	13	1	168	141	27	9
(France) Montferrand	6	4	0	2	19	6	13	154	85	69	8
(Italy) Benetton Treviso	6	2	0	4	6	16	−10	100	167	−67	4
(England) Harlequins	6	1	1	4	8	12	−4	120	149	−29	3

19 November 1999
19:10

Cardiff (Wales)	32–32	(England) Harlequins

Cardiff Arms Park
Attendance: 8,273

20 November 1999
14:30

Benetton Treviso (Italy)	15–21	(France) Montferrand

Stadio Comunale di Monigo
Attendance: 4,000

27 November 1999
15:00

Harlequins (England)	19–22	(Italy) Benetton Treviso

Twickenham Stoop
Attendance: 3,258

27 November 1999
15:10

Montferrand (France)	46–13	(Wales) Cardiff

Stade Marcel-Michelin
Attendance: 15,000

11 December 1999
14:30

Cardiff (Wales)	23–16	(Italy) Benetton Treviso

Cardiff Arms Park
Attendance: 5,000

11 December 1999
15:00

Harlequins (England)	11–9	(France) Montferrand

Twickenham Stoop
Attendance: 2,653

18 December 1999
14:30

Benetton Treviso (Italy)	16–40	(Wales) Cardiff

Stadio Comunale di Monigo
Attendance: 3,000

18 December 1999
17:00

Montferrand (France)	32–9	(England) Harlequins

Stade Marcel-Michelin
Attendance: 10,000

8 January 2000
14:30

Benetton Treviso (Italy)	24–23	(England) Harlequins

Stadio Comunale di Monigo
Attendance: 3,500

8 January 2000
14:30

Cardiff (Wales)	30–5	(France) Montferrand

Cardiff Arms Park
Attendance: 9,000

16 January 2000
14:30

Harlequins (England)	26–30	(Wales) Cardiff

Twickenham Stoop
Attendance: 6,400

16 January 2000
15:00

Montferrand (France)	41–7	(Italy) Benetton Treviso

Stade Marcel-Michelin
Attendance: 7,000

== Pool 6 ==
Team	P	W	D	L	Tries for	Tries against	Try diff	Points for	Points against	Points diff	Pts
(England) Northampton	6	5	0	1	19	7	12	184	87	97	10
(France) FC Grenoble	6	3	0	3	13	15	−2	110	140	−30	6
(Scotland) Edinburgh Reivers	6	3	0	3	13	19	−6	112	158	−46	6
(Wales) Neath	6	1	0	5	13	17	−4	128	149	−21	2

Results

Date	Stadium	Team	Score	Team
19 November	Netherdale, Galashiels (Scotland)	Edinburgh	23 - 18	FC Grenoble
27 November	Lesdiguières, Grenoble (France)	FC Grenoble	20 - 18	Northampton Saints
11 December	The Gnoll, Neath (Wales)	Neath RFC	43 - 14	FC Grenoble
18 December	Lesdiguières, Grenoble (France)	FC Grenoble	21 - 10	Neath RFC
9 January	Franklin's Gardens, Northampton (England)	Northampton Saints	27 - 16	FC Grenoble
15 January	Lesdiguières, Grenoble (France)	FC Grenoble	21 - 19	Edinburgh

19 November 1999
15:00

Northampton Saints (England)	21–12	(Wales) Neath

Franklin's Gardens
Attendance: 6,128

19 November 1999
19:00

Edinburgh (Scotland)	23–18	(France) Grenoble

Netherdale
Attendance: 2,500

27 November 1999
14:30

Neath (Wales)	20–31	(Scotland) Edinburgh

The Gnoll
Attendance: 3,500

27 November 1999
15:00

Grenoble (France)	20–18	(England) Northampton Saints

Stade Lesdiguieres
Attendance: 7,000

11 December 1999
14:30

Neath (Wales)	43–14	(France) Grenoble

The Gnoll
Attendance: 2,000

11 December 1999
15:00

Northampton Saints (England)	32–10	(Scotland) Edinburgh

Franklin's Gardens
Attendance: 6,476

17 December 1999
19:00

Edinburgh (Scotland)	8–47	(England) Northampton Saints

Myreside
Attendance: 4,000

17 December 1999
19:00

Grenoble (France)	21–10	(Wales) Neath

Stade Chaban Delmas
Attendance: 2,000

7 January 2000
19:00

Edinburgh (Scotland)	23–20	(Wales) Neath

Attendance: 2,500

9 January 2000
15:15

Northampton Saints (England)	27–16	(France) Grenoble

Franklin's Gardens
Attendance: 7,027

15 January 2000
14:30

Neath (Wales)	23–39	(England) Northampton Saints

The Gnoll
Attendance: 4,000

15 January 2000
14:30

Grenoble (France)	21–19	(Scotland) Edinburgh

Stade Lesdiguieres
Attendance: 1,500

== Seeding ==
Seed	Pool Winners	Pts	TF	+/−
1	(France) Toulouse	10	24	+127
2	(England) Northampton Saints	10	19	+97
3	(Ireland) Munster	10	19	+56
4	(Wales) Llanelli	10	17	+66
5	(Wales) Cardiff	9	14	+27
6	(France) Stade Français	8	22	+83
Seed	Pool Runners-up	Pts	TF	+/−
7	(England) London Wasps	10	16	+64
8	(France) Montferrand	8	19	+69
–	(England) Bath	8	15	+90
–	(Ireland) Leinster	8	12	+12
–	(England) Saracens	6	24	+53
–	(Scotland) Edinburgh Reivers	6	13	−30

== See also ==
- 1999-2000 Heineken Cup
