= Duncan McRae (rugby) =

Australian rugby league footballer

Personal information
- Born: 27 September 1974 (age 51) Sydney, New South Wales, Australia

Playing information
- Height: 5 ft 6 in (168 cm)

Rugby league
- Position: Halfback, Hooker, Fullback
Club
Years	Team	Pld	T	G	FG	P
1993–95	South Sydney	23	4	0	0	16
1995–96	London Broncos	16	6	0	1	25
1997–98	Canterbury Bulldogs	11	1	0	0	4
	Total	50	11	0	1	45

Rugby union
Club
Years	Team	Pld	T	G	FG	P
1999	New South Wales Waratahs
2000–01	Saracens
2001	New South Wales Waratahs
2001	Randwick
2003–06	Gloucester
	Total	0	0	0	0	0

Duncan McRae (born 27 September 1974) is an Australian former rugby league and rugby union footballer. In union he played at fly-half or full-back.

== Background ==
McRae was born in Sydney, New South Wales, Australia.

== Early life and career ==
McRae attended Sydney Boys High School in the early 1990s along with Chris Whitaker & Steven Bell. In the 1990s McRae spent six seasons in the NRL with South Sydney, playing 23 first-grade games between 1993 and 1995 and Canterbury where he played 11 first grade games between 1997–99 and also led the Bulldogs reserve grade side to the 1998 premiership. In 1996, he played a season with the London Broncos in the Super League.

== New South Wales Waratahs ==
In 1999, McRae switched codes playing three seasons with the New South Wales Waratahs. In 2000 McRae joined Saracens, before returning to the Waratahs and Randwick in 2001. In October 2003 McRae joined Gloucester.

== Disciplinary problems ==
In 2001, during the match between the New South Wales Waratahs and the British & Irish Lions, McRae was sent off for punching Irish fly-half Ronan O'Gara eleven times in the head as O'Gara lay grounded. He received a seven-week ban for the assault.

== Retirement ==
McRae retired in 2006, after sustaining a severe neck injury. In a game in the 2005/06 English domestic season against Saracens McRae entered a ruck and crushed vertebrae at the top of his spinal column. He played a few more games but retired shortly after, returning to Australia.
