= 2001–02 Heineken Cup pool stage =

- Season: 2001–02 Heineken Cup
- Date: 28 September 2001 – 13 January 2002

Qualifiers
- Seed 1: (England) Bath
- Seed 2: (France) Stade Français
- Seed 3: (France) Castres
- Seed 4: (England) Leicester Tigers
- Seed 5: (Ireland) Leinster
- Seed 6: (France) Montferrand
- Seed 7: (Ireland) Munster
- Seed 8: (Wales) Llanelli

In the 2001–2002 Heineken Cup pool stage matches, teams received

- 2 points for a win
- 1 point for a draw

== Pool 1 ==
Team	P	W	D	L	Tries for	Tries against	Try diff	Points for	Points against	Points diff	Pts
(England) Leicester Tigers	6	5	0	1	17	3	14	175	88	87	10
(Wales) Llanelli	6	4	0	2	22	8	14	187	99	88	8
(France) Perpignan	6	3	0	3	19	11	8	182	136	46	6
(Italy) L'Amatori & Calvisano	6	0	0	6	6	42	−36	58	279	−221	0

29 September 2001
17:15

Leicester Tigers (England)	12–9	(Wales) Llanelli

Welford Road
Attendance: 15,170

29 September 2001
19:30

Perpignan (France)	56–3	(Italy) Calvisano

Stade Aime Giral
Attendance: 3,000

5 October 2001
18:45

Llanelli (Wales)	20–6	(France) Perpignan

Stradey Park
Attendance: 4,326

7 October 2001
14:30

Calvisano (Italy)	3–37	(England) Leicester Tigers

Centro Sportivo San Michele
Attendance: 2,500

27 October 2001
19:30

Perpignan (France)	30–31	(England) Leicester Tigers

Stade Aime Giral
Attendance: 11,000

28 October 2001
14:30

Calvisano (Italy)	13–31	(Wales) Llanelli

Centro Sportivo San Michele
Attendance: 300

3 November 2001
14:30

Llanelli (Wales)	93–14	(Italy) Calvisano

Stradey Park
Attendance: 4,000

3 November 2001
19:30

Leicester Tigers (England)	54–15	(France) Perpignan

Welford Road
Attendance: 15,662

4 January 2002
20:05

Perpignan (France)	42–10	(Wales) Llanelli

Stade Aime Giral
Attendance: 4,500

5 January 2002
15:00

Leicester Tigers (England)	29–7	(Italy) Calvisano

Welford Road
Attendance: 15,140

12 January 2002
14:30

Calvisano (Italy)	18–33	(France) Perpignan

Centro Sportivo San Michele
Attendance: 1,300

12 January 2002
15:00

Llanelli (Wales)	24–12	(England) Leicester Tigers

Stradey Park
Attendance: 10,614

== Pool 2 ==
Team	P	W	D	L	Tries for	Tries against	Try diff	Points for	Points against	Points diff	Pts
(France) Stade Français	6	5	0	1	23	4	19	213	64	149	10
(Ireland) Ulster	6	4	0	2	17	11	6	196	142	54	8
(England) Wasps	6	2	0	4	9	9	0	120	186	−66	4
(Italy) Benetton Treviso	6	1	0	5	2	27	−25	102	239	−137	2

29 September 2001
15:30

Benetton Treviso (Italy)	v	(Ireland) Ulster
Try: Perziano; Con: Mason; Pen: Mason (7)	Report	Try: Ward, Topping, Humphreys; Con: Humphreys (3); Pen: Humphreys (4)

Stadio Comunale di Monigo
Attendance: 4,000
Referee: P. Adams

30 September 2001
15:45

London Wasps (England)	19–25	(France) Stade Français

Loftus Road
Attendance: 5,950

5 October 2001
18:50

Ulster (Ireland)	42 – 19	(England) London Wasps
Try: Humphreys, Howe; Con: Humphreys; Pen: Humphreys (6); Drop: Humphreys (4)	Report	Try: Green; Con: Logan; Pen: Logan (4)

Ravenhill
Attendance: 10,000
Referee: G. Desantis

6 October 2001
18:00

Stade Français (France)	42–9	(Italy) Benetton Treviso

Stade Jean-Bouin
Attendance: 3,742

27 October 2001
14:50

Stade Français (France)	40 – 11	(Ireland) Ulster
Try: Marconnet, Galthié, Jonnet, Dominici; Con: Domínguez (3), Berthe; Pen: Domínguez (4)	Report	Try: McWhirter; Pen: Wallace (2)

Stade Jean-Bouin
Attendance: 6,000
Referee: Steve Lander

28 October 2001
15:00

London Wasps (England)	29–24	(Italy) Benetton Treviso

Loftus Road
Attendance: 3,700

2 November 2001
14:50

Ulster (Ireland)	19 – 16	(France) Stade Français
Try: Howe; Con: Wallace; Pen: Humphreys (3), Wallace	Report	Try: James, Jonnet; Pen: Domínguez (2)

Ravenhill
Attendance: 13,000
Referee: N. Whitehouse

3 November 2001
14:30

Benetton Treviso (Italy)	32–17	(England) London Wasps

Stadio Comunale di Monigo
Attendance: 4,000

5 January 2002
14:30

Benetton Treviso (Italy)	6–59	(France) Stade Français

Stadio Comunale di Monigo
Attendance: 4,000

6 January 2002
15:45

London Wasps (England)	36 – 32	(Ireland) Ulster
Try: Denney, Roiser, Waters; Con: A. King (3); Pen: A. King (5)	Report	Try: Ward, Constable; Con: Wallace (2); Pen: Humphreys (2), Wallace (3); Drop: Wallace

Loftus Road
Attendance: 5,556
Referee: G. Morandin

11 January 2002
19:00

Ulster (Ireland)	59 – 3	(Italy) Benetton Treviso
Try: Howe (2), Doak (2), Longwell, Constable, Larkin, penalty try Con: Humphreys, Wallace (4); Pen: Humphreys (3)	Report	Pen: Mason

Ravenhill
Attendance: 12,500
Referee: N. Whitehouse

12 January 2002
18:00

Stade Français (France)	31–0	(England) London Wasps

Stade Jean-Bouin
Attendance: 8,000

== Pool 3 ==
Team	P	W	D	L	Tries for	Tries against	Try diff	Points for	Points against	Points diff	Pts
(England) Bath	6	6	0	0	16	2	14	161	56	105	12
(France) Biarritz Olympique	6	2	1	3	11	7	4	104	95	9	5
(Wales) Swansea	6	2	0	4	2	12	−10	92	142	−50	4
(Scotland) Edinburgh Reivers	6	1	1	4	6	14	−8	82	146	−64	3

29 September 2001
14:30

Swansea (Wales)	21–16	(Scotland) Edinburgh

St. Helen's
Attendance: 4,000

29 September 2001
18:30

Biarritz (France)	6–14	(England) Bath

Parc des Sports Aquil
Attendance: 6,500

5 October 2001
19:30

Edinburgh (Scotland)	6–6	(France) Biarritz

Myreside
Attendance: 4,470

6 October 2001
14:15

Bath (England)	38–9	(Wales) Swansea

Recreation Ground
Attendance: 7,727

27 October 2001
17:30

Swansea (Wales)	15–10	(France) Biarritz

St. Helen's
Attendance: 3,000

27 October 2001
18:15

Edinburgh (Scotland)	6–37	(England) Bath

Myreside
Attendance: 5,163

3 November 2001
15:00

Bath (England)	17–10	(Scotland) Edinburgh

Recreation Ground
Attendance: 7,811

3 November 2001
18:30

Biarritz (France)	24–15	(Wales) Swansea

Parc des Sports Aquil
Attendance: 4,000

5 January 2002
17:30

Swansea (Wales)	12–24	(England) Bath

St. Helen's
Attendance: 3,000

5 January 2002
18:30

Biarritz (France)	45–14	(Scotland) Edinburgh

Parc des Sports Aquil
Attendance: 3,500

11 January 2002
19:30

Edinburgh (Scotland)	30–20	(Wales) Swansea

Myreside
Attendance: 3,256

12 January 2002
18:15

Bath (England)	31–13	(France) Biarritz

Recreation Ground
Attendance: 7,900

== Pool 4 ==
Team	P	W	D	L	Tries for	Tries against	Try diff	Points for	Points against	Points diff	Pts
(France) Castres Olympique	6	5	0	1	19	12	7	179	125	54	10
(Ireland) Munster	6	5	0	1	17	6	11	172	87	85	10
(England) Harlequins	6	2	0	4	14	20	−6	119	187	−68	4
(Wales) Bridgend	6	0	0	6	11	23	−12	116	187	−71	0

29 September 2001
15:00

Munster (Ireland)	28–23	(France) Castres

Thomond Park
Attendance: 10,500

29 September 2001
19:10

Bridgend (Wales)	24–30	(England) Harlequins

Brewery Field
Attendance: 4,000

6 October 2001
17:00

Harlequins (England)	8–24	(Ireland) Munster

Twickenham Stoop
Attendance: 9,000

6 October 2001
19:30

Castres (France)	35–23	(Wales) Bridgend

Stade Pierre-Antoine
Attendance: 3,000

26 October 2001
19:05

Bridgend (Wales)	12–16	(Ireland) Munster

Brewery Field
Attendance: 4,000

28 October 2001
15:45

Harlequins (England)	17–39	(France) Castres

Twickenham Stoop
Attendance: 5,512

3 November 2001
15:00

Munster (Ireland)	40–6	(Wales) Bridgend

Attendance: 8,500

3 November 2001
19:30

Castres (France)	24–18	(England) Harlequins

Stade Pierre-Antoine
Attendance: 5,000

5 January 2002
15:00

Munster (Ireland)	51–17	(England) Harlequins

Thomond Park
Attendance: 14,000

5 January 2002
17:00

Bridgend (Wales)	26–37	(France) Castres

Brewery Field
Attendance: 1,500

12 January 2002
15:00

Castres (France)	21–13	(Ireland) Munster

Stade Pierre-Antoine
Attendance: 9,200

12 January 2002
15:00

Harlequins (England)	29–25	(Wales) Bridgend

Twickenham Stoop
Attendance: 4,152

== Pool 5 ==
Team	P	W	D	L	Tries for	Tries against	Try diff	Points for	Points against	Points diff	Pts
(France) Montferrand	6	4	1	1	23	7	16	191	100	91	9
(Wales) Cardiff	6	3	0	3	16	15	1	154	154	0	6
(Scotland) Glasgow Caledonians	6	2	1	3	10	23	−13	126	198	−72	5
(England) Northampton	6	2	0	4	12	16	−4	132	151	−19	4

28 September 2001
18:45

Cardiff (Wales)	25–17	(England) Northampton Saints

Cardiff Arms Park
Attendance: 10,200

28 September 2001
19:30

Glasgow (Scotland)	19–19	(France) Montferrand

Hughenden
Attendance: 5,764

6 October 2001
16:00

Montferrand (France)	37–10	(Wales) Cardiff

Stade Marcel-Michelin
Attendance: 8,500

7 October 2001
15:45

Northampton Saints (England)	30–9	(Scotland) Glasgow

Franklin's Gardens
Attendance: 7,433

27 October 2001
15:00

Cardiff (Wales)	46–7	(Scotland) Glasgow

Cardiff Arms Park
Attendance: 9,300

27 October 2001
15:00

Northampton Saints (England)	15–21	(France) Montferrand

Franklin's Gardens
Attendance: 7,873

3 November 2001
15:00

Montferrand (France)	50–17	(England) Northampton Saints

Stade Marcel-Michelin
Attendance: 10,146

4 November 2001
15:45

Glasgow (Scotland)	47–32	(Wales) Cardiff

Hughenden
Attendance: 4,823

4 January 2002
15:00

Glasgow (Scotland)	31–27	(England) Northampton Saints

Hughenden
Attendance: 3,426

5 January 2002
15:00

Cardiff (Wales)	26–20	(France) Montferrand

Cardiff Arms Park
Attendance: 9,000

12 January 2002
15:00

Northampton Saints (England)	26–15	(Wales) Cardiff

Franklin's Gardens
Attendance: 9,769

13 January 2002
15:00

Montferrand (France)	44–13	(Scotland) Glasgow

Stade Marcel-Michelin
Attendance: 10,000

== Pool 6 ==
Team	P	W	D	L	Tries for	Tries against	Try diff	Points for	Points against	Points diff	Pts
(Ireland) Leinster	6	5	0	1	15	11	4	139	104	35	10
(Wales) Newport	6	3	0	3	17	13	4	151	146	5	6
(France) Toulouse	6	3	0	3	16	11	5	158	141	17	6
(England) Newcastle	6	1	0	5	8	21	−13	117	174	−57	2

28 September 2001
19:00

Leinster (Ireland)	40–10	(France) Toulouse

Donnybrook
Attendance: 7,500

29 September 2001
18:15

Newcastle Falcons (England)	21–34	(Wales) Newport

Kingston Park Stadium
Attendance: 5,000

5 October 2001
19:00

Leinster (Ireland)	28–9	(England) Newcastle Falcons

Donnybrook
Attendance: 7,500

6 October 2001
18:15

Newport (Wales)	21–20	(France) Toulouse

Rodney Parade
Attendance: 9,180

26 October 2001
19:00

Leinster (Ireland)	21–6	(Wales) Newport

Donnybrook
Attendance: 7,500

28 October 2001
14:50

Toulouse (France)	33–13	(England) Newcastle Falcons

Stade Ernest Wallon
Attendance: 8,228

2 November 2001
19:05

Newport (Wales)	21–26	(Ireland) Leinster

Rodney Parade
Attendance: 10,285

3 November 2001
15:00

Newcastle Falcons (England)	42–9	(France) Toulouse

Kingston Park Stadium
Attendance: 5,041

5 January 2002
18:00

Toulouse (France)	36–23	(Wales) Newport

Stadium Municipal
Attendance: 6,400

8 January 2002
19:30

Newcastle Falcons (England)	15–17	(Ireland) Leinster

Headingley Stadium
Attendance: 1,146

11 January 2002
19:05

Newport (Wales)	53–17	(England) Newcastle Falcons

Rodney Parade
Attendance: 8,173

13 January 2002
14:30

Toulouse (France)	43–7	(Ireland) Leinster

Stadium Municipal
Attendance: 6,746

== Seeding ==
Seed	Pool Winners	Pts	TF	+/−
1	(England) Bath	12	16	+105
2	(France) Stade Français	10	23	+149
3	(France) Castres	10	19	+54
4	(England) Leicester Tigers	10	17	+87
5	(Ireland) Leinster	10	15	+35
6	(France) Montferrand	9	23	+91
Seed	Pool Runners-up	Pts	TF	+/−
7	(Ireland) Munster	10	17	+85
8	(Wales) Llanelli	8	22	+88
–	(Ireland) Ulster	8	17	+54
–	(Wales) Newport	6	17	+5
–	(Wales) Cardiff	6	16	0
–	(France) Biarritz Olympique	5	11	+9

== See also ==
- 2001-02 Heineken Cup
