= Cromwell Property Group =

- Company type: Public company
- Traded as: ASX: CMW
- Founded: 1998 in Australia
- Headquarters: Brisbane, Australia
- Areas served: Australia
- Key people: Jonathan Callaghan; Gary Weiss (Chairman)
- Revenue: ▲ A$494.7 million (2020) (2020)
- Net income: ▲ A$181.1 million (2020)
- Total assets: ▲ A$4,990.5 million (2020) (2020)
- Number of employees: 440 (2020)
- Website: www.cromwellpropertygroup.com

Cromwell Property Group is a commercial real estate investment and management company with operations in Australia, New Zealand and Europe. The Group is in the ASX 200 list. At December 2020, Cromwell had a market capitalisation of $A2.3 billion, a direct property investment portfolio in Australia valued at $A3 billion and total assets under management of $A11.6 billion across Australia, New Zealand and Europe.

Cromwell employees 440 staff in 28 offices in 14 countries. Assets Under Management are spread across sectors including Office (66.2%), Retail (14.3%), Industrial/Logistics (13.4%), Property Securities (3.3%) and Other (2.8%). The portfolio comprises 220+ assets let to more than 2,850 tenants.

== History ==
The company began as a property syndicator, Westholme Ltd, renaming to Cromwell Corporation Ltd in 1998. By 2003 it had purchased 14 properties with a value of more than $A300 million in five Australian states and had $58 million of that in Cromwell Diversified Property Trust(CDPT). In 2004 it purchased 11 properties for $152 million, including 700 Collins Street, Melbourne for $A133 million, as a cornerstone investment in the CDPT. CDPT is merged with five smaller unlisted property trusts and stapled to Cromwell Corporation Limited creating Cromwell Property Group. In 2010 Cromwell raised $75.4 million via a placement and rights issue and acquired the Qantas Global Headquarters in Mascot, NSW for $143 million. In 2013 is had expanded enough to enter the ASX 300 Index. In 2015 it moved into Europe by acquiring Valad Europe, a pan-European commercial real estate platform for $208 million. In 2017 it launched Cromwell European REIT on main board of Singapore Stock Exchange.

== Controversies ==
In September 2020 a federal Liberal senator called for Foreign Investment Review Board (FIRB) regulators to step in and block a Singapore takeover offer for the Cromwell Property Group, arguing the bid contravened new rules brought in to safeguard Australian assets during the coronavirus pandemic. Cromwell co-founder and CEO Paul Weightman retired after 22 years following a boardroom battle over a failed proportional takeover bid by Singapore's ARA Asset Management. There has been significant turmoil in the leadership of the company, with a new chair appointed in March 2021.

In February 2021 Cromwell was forced to downgrade its distribution guidance for the year and put on hold a plan to launch a $1 billion Europe-based data centre fund. The COVID 19 pandemic and boardroom disruption were blamed.
