= Harry Sibson =

English rugby union player

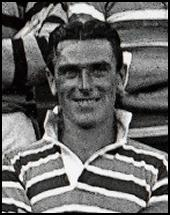
- Harry Sibson in his playing days
- Born: Harry Sibson; 15 July 1919 Leicester
- Died: 5 January 2010 (aged 90)

Rugby union career
- Position: Wing Forward
Amateur team(s)
Years	Team	Apps	(Points)
1945 - 1947	Aylestonians	20	
1947 - 1954	Leicester Tigers	183	

Harry Sibson (15 July 1919 – 5 January 2010), was a wing forward who played for Aylestonians prior to being invited to join Leicester Tigers. Harry played 183 games for Tigers between 1947 and 1954, he was also club secretary and between 1981 and 1983 he was Leicester Tigers president. He was an official at the Tigers when a great many players came through the teams to England honours; Peter Wheeler, Clive Woodward, Paul Dodge, Dusty Hare, Les Cusworth, Dean Richards to name a few. He was affectionally known by the players as "The Scrimshanker", a reference to his insistence that there would be "no room for scrimshankers on the pitch today". Harry Sibson is also credited with the introduction of the new offside rule. Prior to this time wing forwards at that time needed only to keep behind the ball in the scrum. The press comment was "one thing would be to introduce new rules curbing the power of the wing forward. Sibson … showed us, particularly in the Cardiff match at Welford Road, just how well open play can be stifled…. holding Haydn Tanner in subjection in the 1947-8 campaign". Haydn Tanner was considered the best scrum half of his generation.
