= Jos Baxendell =

English rugby union player

- Born: Joshua John Neill Baxendell; 3 December 1972 (age 53) Cheshire, England
- Height: 6 ft (1.8 m)
- Weight: 14.4 st (91 kg)
- School: King's Macclesfield
- University: Sheffield Hallam University

Rugby union career
- Position(s): Centre, Fly-half
- Current team: retired
Amateur team(s)
Years	Team	Apps	(Points)
- Wilmslow
- Correct as of 4 July 2014
Senior career
Years	Team	Apps	(Points)
1992–1994	Sheffield	14	(10)
1993–2005	Sale Sharks	174	(216)
- Correct as of 4 July 2014
International career
Years	Team	Apps	(Points)
1998	England	2	(0)
- Correct as of 4 July 2014
Coaching career
- Years: Team
- 2007–09: Sale Sharks
- 2009–10: Russian Rugby Union
- 2011–12: Sale Sharks
- Correct as of 3 June 2015

Jos Baxendell (born 3 December 1972, in Manchester, England) is a former Sale Sharks rugby union player and coach. He played in two full tests for England, both in 1998.
