= Murray Driver =

- Full name: Murray John Driver
- Born: 5 April 1972 (age 54) Hamilton, New Zealand
- Height: 5 ft 11 in (180 cm)
- Weight: 242 lb (110 kg)

Rugby union career
- Position: Prop
Provincial / State sides
Years	Team	Apps	(Points)
1994–96	Waikato	32	(0)
1998–00	Wellington	19	(0)
Super Rugby
Years	Team	Apps	(Points)
1996	Highlanders	3	(0)

Murray John Driver (born 5 April 1972) is a New Zealand former professional rugby union player.

Born in Hamilton, Driver was a NZ Colts representative prop, picked from Waikato to make three appearances for the Highlanders during the 1996 Super 12 season. He played in England from 1996 to 1998 with the Sale Sharks, coached by his former Waikato teammate John Mitchell, then on his return to New Zealand linked up with Wellington. After three years in the New Zealand capital, Driver played some rugby in Scotland, with Boroughmuir and Edinburgh.

Driver is an ex-Hamilton Marist head coach and has also coached in Japan.
