= 2000–01 Heineken Cup pool stage =

- Season: 2000–01 Heineken Cup
- Date: 6 October 2000 – 23 January 2001

Qualifiers
- Seed 1: (France) Stade Français
- Seed 2: (England) Leicester Tigers
- Seed 3: (Ireland) Munster
- Seed 4: (England) Gloucester
- Seed 5: (Wales) Cardiff
- Seed 6: (France) Biarritz Olympique
- Seed 7: (Wales) Swansea
- Seed 8: (France) Pau

In the 2000–2001 Heineken Cup pool stage matches, teams received

- 2 points for a win
- 1 points for a draw

== Pool 1 ==
Team	P	W	D	L	Tries for	Tries against	Try diff	Points for	Points against	Points diff	Pts
(France) Biarritz Olympique	6	4	0	2	13	20	−7	164	152	12	8
(Scotland) Edinburgh Reivers	6	3	1	2	17	12	5	154	141	13	7
(Ireland) Leinster	6	3	1	2	13	14	−1	149	156	−7	7
(England) Northampton	6	1	0	5	17	14	3	138	156	−18	2

Edinburgh finished above Leinster despite having a lower points difference, as the first tie-breaker was the results in the two matches between the teams.

6 October 2000
19:00

Edinburgh (Scotland)	29–21	(Ireland) Leinster

Myreside
Attendance: 3,700

7 October 2000
16:15

Biarritz (France)	37–30	(England) Northampton Saints

Parc des Sports Aquil
Attendance: 10,000

13 October 2000
19:00

Leinster (Ireland)	35–9	(France) Biarritz

Donnybrook
Attendance: 4,000

14 October 2000
15:00

Northampton Saints (England)	22–23	(Scotland) Edinburgh

Franklin's Gardens
Attendance: 7,057

21 October 2000
15:00

Northampton Saints (England)	8–14	(Ireland) Leinster

Franklin's Gardens
Attendance: 7,183

21 October 2000
18:30

Biarritz (France)	29–18	(Scotland) Edinburgh

Parc des Sports Aquil
Attendance: 4,000

27 October 2000
19:00

Edinburgh (Scotland)	27–35	(France) Biarritz

Netherdale
Attendance: 4,500

27 October 2000
19:00

Leinster (Ireland)	40–31	(England) Northampton Saints

Donnybrook
Attendance: 8,500

12 January 2001
19:00

Leinster (Ireland)	34–34	(Scotland) Edinburgh

Donnybrook
Attendance: 8,000

13 January 2001
15:00

Northampton Saints (England)	32–24	(France) Biarritz

Franklin's Gardens
Attendance: 6,019

19 January 2001
19:00

Edinburgh (Scotland)	18–15	(England) Northampton Saints

Murrayfield Stadium
Attendance: 4,000

20 January 2000
18:30

Biarritz (France)	30–10	(Ireland) Leinster

Parc des Sports Aquil
Attendance: 10,000

== Pool 2 ==
Team	P	W	D	L	Tries for	Tries against	Try diff	Points for	Points against	Points diff	Pts
(France) Stade Français	6	5	0	1	36	4	32	297	85	212	10
(Wales) Swansea	6	4	0	2	28	11	17	244	123	121	8
(England) Wasps	6	3	0	3	20	14	6	175	156	19	6
(Italy) L'Aquila	6	0	0	6	3	58	−55	40	392	−352	0

7 October 2000
14:30

Swansea (Wales)	54–28	(England) London Wasps

St. Helen's
Attendance: 5,500

7 October 2000
19:00

Stade Français (France)	92–7	(Italy) L'Aquila

Stade Jean-Bouin
Attendance: 6,000

14 October 2000
14:30

Swansea (Wales)	18–16	(France) Stade Français

St. Helen's
Attendance: 4,500

15 October 2000
15:00

L'Aquila (Italy)	10–39	(England) London Wasps

Stadio Comunale Frantern
Attendance: 3,500

21 October 2000
15:15

Stade Français (France)	40–10	(England) London Wasps

Stade Jean-Bouin
Attendance: 8,000

22 October 2000
15:00

L'Aquila (Italy)	6–70	(Wales) Swansea

Stade Tommaso Fattori
Attendance: 1,500

28 October 2000
14:30

Swansea (Wales)	73–3	(Italy) L'Aquila

St. Helen's
Attendance: 3,000

29 October 2000
15:00

London Wasps (England)	28–31	(France) Stade Français

Loftus Road
Attendance: 8,233

13 January 2001
15:00

L'Aquila (Italy)	9–76	(France) Stade Français

Stade Tommaso Fattori
Attendance: 1,500

14 January 2001
15:00

London Wasps (England)	28–16	(Wales) Swansea

Loftus Road
Attendance: 6,383

20 January 2001
15:15

Stade Français (France)	42–13	(Wales) Swansea

Stade Jean-Bouin
Attendance: 12,000

21 January 2001
15:00

London Wasps (England)	42–5	(Italy) L'Aquila

Loftus Road
Attendance: 3,244

== Pool 3 ==
Team	P	W	D	L	Tries for	Tries against	Try diff	Points for	Points against	Points diff	Pts
(Wales) Cardiff	6	4	0	2	14	13	1	174	140	34	8
(England) Saracens	6	4	0	2	18	13	5	182	146	36	8
(France) Toulouse	6	2	1	3	19	15	4	171	182	−11	5
(Ireland) Ulster	6	1	1	4	11	21	−10	146	205	−59	3

Cardiff won the group despite having a lower points difference than Saracens, as the first tie-breaker was the results in the two matches between the teams.

6 October 2000
19:15

Ulster (Ireland)	32 – 23	(Wales) Cardiff
Try: Constable, Howe; Con: Humphreys (2); Pen: Humphreys (5); Drop: Humphreys	Report	Try: Jenkins, Morgan; Con: Jenkins (2); Pen: Jenkins (3)

Ravenhill
Attendance: 12,000

7 October 2000
15:00

Toulouse (France)	22–32	(England) Saracens

Stadium Municipal
Attendance: 20,000

14 October 2000
17:35

Cardiff (Wales)	26–17	(France) Toulouse

Cardiff Arms Park
Attendance: 9,838

15 October 2000
15:00

Saracens (England)	55 – 25	(Ireland) Ulster
Try: Hill (2), McRae, Luger (3); Con: Castaignède (5); Pen: Castaignède (5)	Report	Try: Stewart; Con: Humphreys; Pen: Humphreys (6)

Vicarage Road
Attendance: 11,258

21 October 2000
15:00

Saracens (England)	23–32	(Wales) Cardiff

Vicarage Road
Attendance: 10,824

22 October 2000
15:00

Toulouse (France)	35 – 35	(Ireland) Ulster
Try: Pelous, Labit, Fillol, Desbrosse; Con: Marfaing (3); Pen: Marfaing (3)	Report	Try: Free, Howe, J. Bell, J. Topping; Con: Humphreys (3); Pen: Humphreys (3)

Stadium Municipal
Attendance: 14,000

27 October 2000
19:05

Cardiff (Wales)	24–14	(England) Saracens

Cardiff Arms Park
Attendance: 13,500

27 October 2000
19:30

Ulster (Ireland)	25 – 29	(France) Toulouse
Try: Ward; Con: Humphreys; Pen: Humphreys (6)	Report	Try: Desbrosse, Servat; Con: Delaigue, Marfaing; Pen: Delaigue (5)

Ravenhill
Attendance: 12,000

12 January 2001
19:05

Cardiff (Wales)	42 – 16	(Ireland) Ulster
Try: Robinson (2), Jenkins, Quinnell; Con: Jenkins (2); Pen: Jenkins (5); Drop: Jenkins	Report	Try: J. Topping (2); Pen: Humphreys (2)

Cardiff Arms Park
Attendance: 10,500

14 January 2001
13:15

Saracens (England)	37–30	(France) Toulouse

Vicarage Road
Attendance: 8,461

19 January 2001
19:30

Ulster (Ireland)	13 – 21	(England) Saracens
Try: Humphreys; Con: Humphreys; Pen: Humphreys (2)	Report	Try: Shanklin, McRae, Hill; Con: McRae (3)

Ravenhill
Attendance: 13,500

20 January 2001
18:00

Toulouse (France)	38–27	(Wales) Cardiff

Les Sept Deniers
Attendance: 10,000

== Pool 4 ==
Team	P	W	D	L	Tries for	Tries against	Try diff	Points for	Points against	Points diff	Pts
(Ireland) Munster	6	5	0	1	15	7	8	154	109	45	10
(England) Bath	6	4	0	2	14	11	3	139	106	33	8
(Wales) Newport	6	2	0	4	10	22	−12	122	183	−61	4
(France) Castres	6	1	0	5	14	13	1	135	152	−17	2

7 October 2000
14:00

Munster (Ireland)	26–18	(Wales) Newport

Thomond Park
Attendance: 9,200

7 October 2000
18:05

Bath (England)	25–13	(France) Castres

Recreation Ground
Attendance: 7,135

13 October 2000
19:05

Newport (Wales)	28–17	(England) Bath

Rodney Parade
Attendance: 11,432

14 October 2000
19:30

Castres (France)	29–32	(Ireland) Munster

Stade Pierre-Antoine
Attendance: 7,500

21 October 2000
14:30

Munster (Ireland)	31–9	(England) Bath

Thomond Park
Attendance: 13,400

21 October 2000
14:30

Newport (Wales)	21–20	(France) Castres

Rodney Parade
Attendance: 7,118

28 October 2000
17:00

Bath (England)	18–5	(Ireland) Munster

Recreation Ground
Attendance: 8,200

28 October 2000
19:30

Castres (France)	43–21	(Wales) Newport

Stade Pierre-Antoine
Attendance: 4,000

13 January 2001
17:15

Castres (France)	19–32	(England) Bath

Stade Pierre-Antoine
Attendance: 4,000

13 January 2001
17:35

Newport (Wales)	24–39	(Ireland) Munster

Rodney Parade
Attendance: 11,431

20 January 2001
14:30

Munster (Ireland)	21–11	(France) Castres

Musgrave Park
Attendance: 9,000

23 January 2001
19:30

Bath (England)	38–10	(Wales) Newport

Recreation Ground
Attendance: 6,500

== Pool 5 ==
Team	P	W	D	L	Tries for	Tries against	Try diff	Points for	Points against	Points diff	Pts
(England) Gloucester	6	4	1	1	13	11	2	186	140	46	9
(Wales) Llanelli	6	4	0	2	18	8	10	187	103	84	8
(France) Colomiers	6	3	1	2	14	11	3	148	120	28	7
(Italy) Roma	6	0	0	6	10	25	−15	88	246	−158	0

6 October 2000
19:05

Llanelli (Wales)	20–27	(England) Gloucester

Stradey Park
Attendance: 7,000

7 October 2000
15:00

Roma (Italy)	5–14	(France) Colomiers

Stadio Tre Fontane
Attendance: 600

14 October 2000
19:00

Colomiers (France)	6–19	(Wales) Llanelli

Stade Selery
Attendance: 2,000

15 October 2000
15:00

Gloucester (England)	52–12	(Italy) Roma

Kingsholm
Attendance: 6,000

21 October 2000
14:30

Llanelli (Wales)	46–0	(Italy) Roma

Stradey Park
Attendance: 5,100

21 October 2000
19:35

Gloucester (England)	22–22	(France) Colomiers

Kingsholm
Attendance: 6,500

28 October 2000
15:15

Colomiers (France)	30–19	(England) Gloucester

Stade Selery
Attendance: 6,000

28 October 2000
15:30

Roma (Italy)	21–41	(Wales) Llanelli

Stadio Flaminio
Attendance: 1,000

13 January 2001
15:00

Gloucester (England)	28–27	(Wales) Llanelli

Kingsholm
Attendance: 10,800

13 January 2001
18:00

Colomiers (France)	55–21	(Italy) Roma

Stade Selery
Attendance: 3,000

19 January 2001
19:05

Llanelli (Wales)	34–21	(France) Colomiers

Stradey Park
Attendance: 10,803

20 January 2001
14:30

Roma (Italy)	29–38	(England) Gloucester

Stadio Tre Fontane
Attendance: 9,200

== Pool 6 ==
Team	P	W	D	L	Tries for	Tries against	Try diff	Points for	Points against	Points diff	Pts
(England) Leicester	6	5	0	1	15	9	6	178	105	73	10
(France) Pau	6	4	0	2	19	10	9	154	142	12	8
(Wales) Pontypridd	6	2	0	4	9	12	−3	136	131	5	4
(Scotland) Glasgow Caledonians	6	1	0	5	12	24	−12	137	227	−90	2

7 October 2000
14:30

Pontypridd (Wales)	40–25	(Scotland) Glasgow

Sardis Road
Attendance: 2,500

7 October 2000
15:00

Leicester Tigers (England)	46–18	(France) Pau

Welford Road
Attendance: 12,331

14 October 2000
14:00

Pau (France)	12–9	(Wales) Pontypridd

Stade du Hameau
Attendance: 4,000

15 October 2000
15:00

Glasgow (Scotland)	21–33	(England) Leicester Tigers

Hughenden
Attendance: 3,500

20 October 2000
19:05

Pontypridd (Wales)	18–11	(England) Leicester Tigers

Sardis Road
Attendance: 4,500

22 October 2000
14:00

Glasgow (Scotland)	24–46	(France) Pau

Hughenden
Attendance: 2,700

28 October 2000
19:30

Pau (France)	44–16	(Scotland) Glasgow

Stade du Hameau
Attendance: 10,000

28 October 2000
19:35

Leicester Tigers (England)	27–19	(Wales) Pontypridd

Welford Road
Attendance: 13,914

13 January 2001
15:15

Pau (France)	3–20	(England) Leicester Tigers

Stade du Hameau
Attendance: 6,800

14 January 2001
15:00

Glasgow (Scotland)	25–23	(Wales) Pontypridd

McDiarmid Park
Attendance: 1,500

20 January 2001
15:00

Leicester Tigers (England)	41–26	(Scotland) Glasgow

Welford Road
Attendance: 12,260

21 January 2001
14:30

Pontypridd (Wales)	27–31	(France) Pau

Brewery Field
Attendance: 2,500

== Seeding ==
Seed	Pool Winners	Pts	TF	+/−
1	(France) Stade Français	10	36	+212
2	(England) Leicester Tigers	10	15	+73
3	(Ireland) Munster	10	15	+45
4	(England) Gloucester	9	13	+46
5	(Wales) Cardiff	8	18	+36
6	(France) Biarritz Olympique	8	13	+12
Seed	Pool Runners-up	Pts	TF	+/−
7	(Wales) Swansea	8	28	+121
8	(France) Pau	8	19	+12
–	(Wales) Llanelli	8	18	+84
–	(England) Saracens	8	14	+34
–	(England) Bath	8	14	+33
–	(Scotland) Edinburgh Reivers	7	17	+13

== See also ==
- 2000–01 Heineken Cup
