= Will Green (rugby union) =

England international rugby union player (born 1973)

- Born: William Robert Green; 25 October 1973 (age 53) Littlehampton, West Sussex, England
- Height: 1.82 m (6 ft 0 in)
- Weight: 256 lb (18 st 4 lb)

Rugby union career
- Position: Prop
Senior career
Years	Team	Apps	(Points)
1995–2005	Wasps	164	(45)
2005–2007	Leinster	44	(10)
International career
Years	Team	Apps	(Points)
1997–2003	England	4	(0)

William Robert Green (born 25 October 1973 in Littlehampton) is a retired rugby union footballer who played at prop for Wasps and Leinster.

== Club career ==
Green began his career at Wasps, making his debut in 1995 and remained there until 2005. Whilst at Wasps he won the Heineken Cup in 2004, the Challenge Cup in 2003 and the domestic Anglo-Welsh Cup (currently known as the LV Cup) in 1999 and 2000. He was also part of the Wasps team which won the Premiership in 1996/97 and a further hat-trick of Premiership titles in 2003, 2004 and 2005. In the summer of 2005 he joined Leinster where he remained until his retirement from the game in 2007.

== International career ==
Green had previously played for various England youth teams alongside the likes of Will Greenwood, Matt Dawson, Simon Shaw and Richard Hill. After making his England debut against Australia in November 1997, Green went on to make 4 appearances for the national team. He was considered an outside candidate to be part of Clive Woodward's ultimately victorious 2003 Rugby World Cup winning squad. However, he was overlooked in the end, despite getting his 4th and final cap against Wales in one of England's warm up games prior to the World Cup, and being in the wider 43-man squad.

== Honours ==
- English Champions titles: 4
  - 1996/97, 2002/03, 2003/04, 2004/05
- RFU Tetley's Bitter Cup & Powergen Cup / Powergen Anglo Welsh Cup titles: 2
  - 1998/99, 1999/2000
- Heineken Cup titles: 1
  - 2003/04
- Parker Pen Challenge Cup titles: 1
  - 2002/03
