= John Wells (rugby union) =

England international rugby union player and coach

- Born: John Martin Wells; 12 May 1963 (age 63) Driffield, England
- School: Magnus Grammar School
- University: Loughborough University

Rugby union career
- Position: Flanker
Senior career
Years	Team	Apps	(Points)
1982–1997	Leicester Tigers	367	(208)
International career
Years	Team	Apps	(Points)
1990	England	1	(0)
Coaching career
- Years: Team
- 1998–2004: Leicester Tigers forwards
- 2004–2005: Leicester Tigers
- 2004–2006: RFU National Academy
- 2006–2011: England forwards
- 2012–2019: Newcastle Falcons
- 2020–2021: Rugby Colorno defence

John Wells (born 12 May 1963) is a former captain and coach of Leicester Tigers rugby union team and presently defence coach for Rugby Colorno in Italy; he has previously been forwards coach for England and head coach for Newcastle Falcons.

== Career ==
Wells was born in Driffield, Yorkshire. He attended Magnus Grammar School and Loughborough University, where he studied sports science and recreation management.

Playing at blindside flanker, he played for England U-16, U-18, Students, U-23 and England 'A'. He was retrospectively capped for England for a game against Italy in Rovigo in 1990, at the time this was considered uncapped.

Wells made his debut for Leicester Tigers in 1982 away against Harlequins, and he went on to play for them over 360 times, captaining the side from 1991 to 1993. He is particularly noted for playing in a back row with England internationals Dean Richards at number eight and Neil Back at openside.

After Director of Rugby Bob Dwyer was sacked, Wells was appointed Leicester's forwards' coach, and deputy to Dean Richards. When Richards was sacked in 2004 after a poor run of results, Wells took over as head coach. He retained this role until the end of the 2004/2005 season, when he left to take up a coaching role at the National Academy.

In 2006 he was appointed as England forwards' coach to assist then head coach Andy Robinson, alongside attack coach Brian Ashton and defence coach Mike Ford. He remained in this position after first Brian Ashton and then Martin Johnson took charge of the team.

In 2012 Wells joined Newcastle Falcons on a short-term contract until the end of the season, taking a permanent role as forwards coach under new Director of Rugby Dean Richards that summer. He was promoted to head coach in the summer of 2014.

In April 2020 Wells moved to Rugby Colorno in Italy to become their defence coach, finishing this role recently.
