= Tom French =

Tom or Thomas French may refer to:

- Thomas French, journalist for the St. Petersburg Times
- Thomas French (cricketer) (1821–1909), English cricketer and cleric
- Thomas French (footballer) (1859–1908), amateur English footballer
- Valpy French (Thomas Valpy French: 1825–1891), British bishop and missionary
- Tom French (jockey) (1844–1873), English jockey
- Tom French (poet), winner of the 2002 Forward Poetry Prize for Best First Collection
- Tom French (Northern Ireland politician), former President of the Workers' Party of Ireland
- Tom French (Australian politician), member of parliament
- Tom French (rugby union), currently in the London Wasps squad
- Tom French Cup, awarded by the New Zealand Rugby Union to the Māori player of the year
