= 2007 Heineken Cup final =

Rugby Union match

2007 Heineken Cup Final
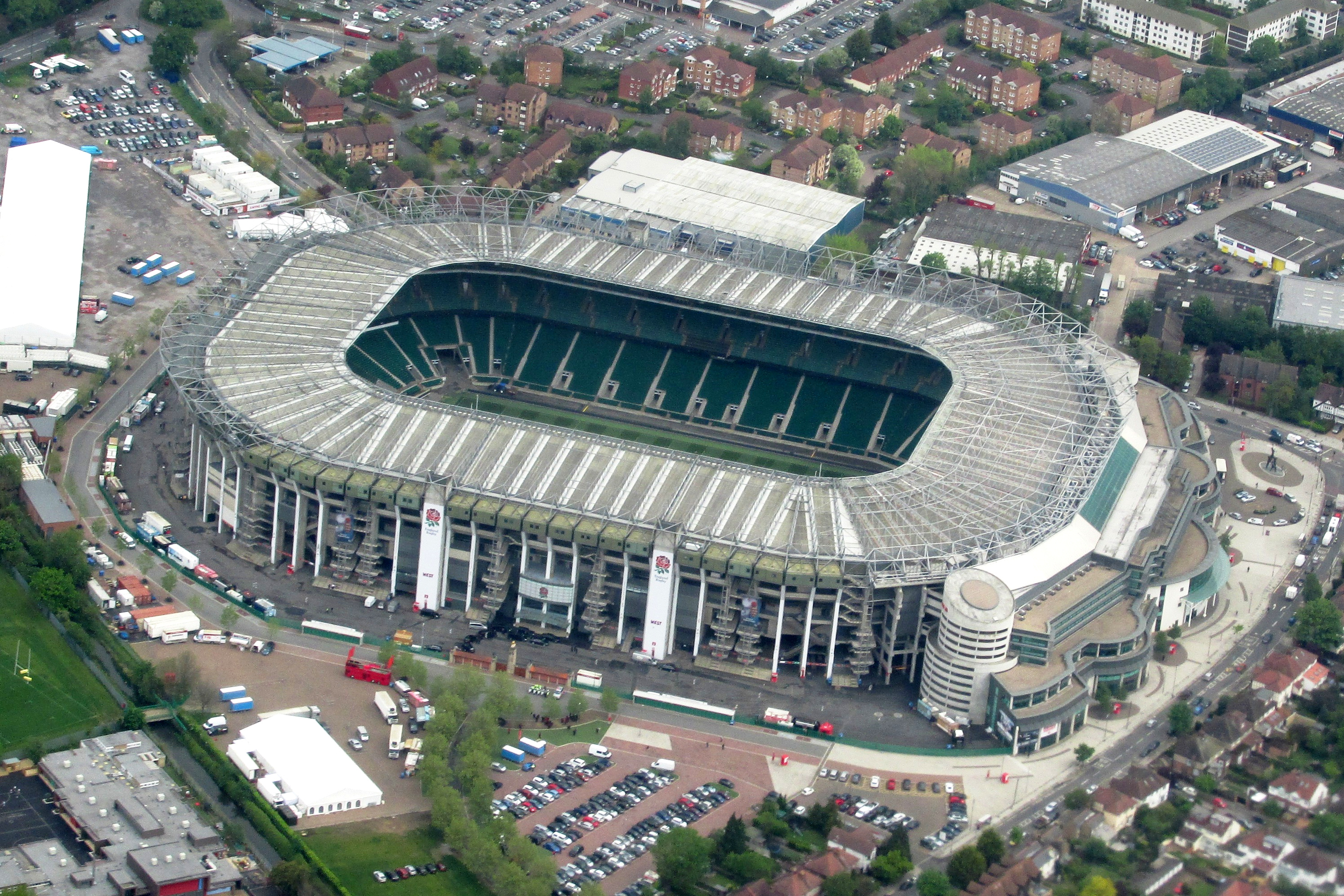
- The match took place at Twickenham Stadium.
- Event: 2006–07 Heineken Cup
Leicester Tigers	London Wasps
(England)	(England)
9	25
- Date: 20 May 2007
- Venue: Twickenham Stadium, London
- Man of the Match: Fraser Waters (London Wasps)
- Referee: Alan Lewis (Ireland)
- Attendance: 81,076

The 2007 Heineken Cup Final was a rugby union match played at Twickenham Stadium in London, England, on 20 May 2007 to determine the winners of the 2006–07 Heineken Cup, European rugby's premier club competition. It was contested by English clubs Leicester Tigers and London Wasps. It was the 12th Heineken Cup final overall, and the third to be contested by two teams from the same nation, after the finals of 2003 and 2005, both of which were all-French affairs. It was Leicester's fourth appearance in the final, following a defeat in 1997 and back-to-back victories in 2001 and 2002. Wasps were competing in their second final, three years after their last appearance in 2004, also at Twickenham, which was hosting the final for the third time after 2000 and 2004.

Each club needed to progress through the group stage and two knockout rounds to reach the final, playing eight matches in total. Wasps and Tigers each won their respective groups to qualify for the quarter-finals. Wasps advanced to the final after defeating Irish side Leinster in the quarter-finals and fellow English club Northampton Saints in the semi-final. Tigers made the final after wins over French side Stade Français in the quarter-finals and the Llanelli Scarlets Welsh regional side in their semi-final. Alan Lewis was the referee for the match, which was played in front of a crowd of 81,076 – a world record for a club rugby union match – and broadcast worldwide in more than 100 countries.

The first score of the match came from Wasps' Alex King, who kicked a penalty in the 4th minute, but Andy Goode equalised for Tigers with another penalty three minutes later. Wasps went back in front thanks to a try from scrum-half Eoin Reddan in the 13th minute, only for King to miss the conversion. Tigers reduced the deficit to two points with a quarter of an hour gone, when Goode scored his second penalty following an infringement by Fraser Waters on Lewis Moody, but Raphaël Ibañez extended Wasps' lead with their second try in the 34th minute, only for King to again miss the conversion. A third penalty for Goode two minutes from half-time meant Wasps led 13–9 at the interval. In the second half, three penalties and a drop goal from King, unanswered by Leicester, ensured Wasps won the game 25–9 and their second Heineken Cup.

== Background ==
The Heineken Cup, European rugby's premier club competition, was established by the Five Nations Committee in 1995 to provide a new level of professional cross-border rugby competition. Clubs from the Premiership Rugby, Pro14, Super 10 and the Top 14 leagues qualified for the competition based on their performance in their respective national leagues.

The 2007 final was the last match of the 2006–07 Heineken Cup and the 12th final of the Heineken Cup. It was the first time in the competition's 12-year history that two English clubs would play each other in the final. This was London Wasps' second Heineken Cup final and their first since beating Toulouse 27–20 in the 2004 final. Leicester Tigers had conversely appeared in three previous finals, the most recent being the 2002 final when they defeated Munster 15–9. The two sides had met each other in the competition twice before in December 2004. Leicester Tigers had won each of their two meetings in the 2004–05 Heineken Cup pool stage. Tigers won the two fixtures between the two clubs in the 2006–07 Premiership Rugby 19–13 at Adams Park in November 2006 and 40–26 at Welford Road Stadium in April 2007. It was the Tigers' third cup final of the season; they had won the 2006–07 EDF Energy Cup and the 2006–07 Premiership Rugby. This meant that the club were aiming to achieve the first treble in English rugby union history.

== Route to the final ==
The 2006–07 Heineken Cup featured 24 teams from England, Wales, Scotland, Ireland, France and Italy who were assigned into six groups of four each. Teams were awarded four points for a win, two for a draw and bonuses were given to clubs scoring four of more tries or losing by seven or fewer points. The winners of each of the six groups as well as the two highest-placed runners-up qualified for the quarter-finals. The four quarter-final winners made the semi-finals which decided the two teams who would face each other in the final.

=== London Wasps ===
Wasps were assigned to the first pool along with Benetton Treviso, Castres and Perpignan. Wasps won their first match 19–16 at home at Adams Park on 21 October 2006, but were defeated 19–12 by Perpignan in their first away fixture of the pool at Stade Aimé Giral a week later. The club's third pool match saw them whitewash Treviso 55–0 in poor weather at Adams Park on 10 December 2006 with a Heineken Cup club-record nine tries and five conversions. The result gave Wasps enough points to usurp Castres atop the pool table. The return fixture at Stadio Comunale di Monigo six days later saw Wasps defeat Treviso 71–5 with a club-record eleven tries and eight conversions to go one point atop the pool table ahead of Perpignan. Wasps' fifth pool game saw the club beating Perpignan 22–14 at Adams Park and needing to win their final match to qualify for the knockout stages. They were able to reach the quarter-finals in their final pool game with a 16–13 victory over Castres at Stade Pierre-Antoine one week later.

In the quarter-finals, Wasps were drawn to play Leinster and the match was played at Adams Park on 31 March 2007. Wasps made but ultimately withdrew a request to host the match at a larger ground so they could receive more gate receipts. Two Alex King penalties and one conversion and Eoin Reddan's try gave Wasps the lead. Chris Whitaker's try and Felipe Contepomi's try and conversion for Leinster made it 13–10 to Wasps at half-time. Second-half tries from James Haskell, Daniel Cipriani and Reddan as well as a penalty and conversion from King ensured Wasps won the match 35–13 to make the semi-finals. In the semi-final, played at Ricoh Arena on 22 April 2007, Wasps faced fellow Premiership Rugby side Northampton Saints. A try, conversion and two penalties all scored by Bruce Reihana put Saints 13–0 ahead before Wasps won the match 30–13 and progression to the final with scoring by Paul Sackey, Haskell, Mark van Gisbergen and Josh Lewsey.

=== Leicester Tigers ===
Leicester Tigers were drawn into the fourth pool along with Munster, Cardiff Blues and Bourgoin. Tigers lost their first match of the pool 19–21 to Munster at home at Welford Road Stadium on 22 October, ending the side's 26-match unbeaten record at home. The team won their following match 21–17 away to Cardiff Blues at Millennium Stadium a week later. Tigers' third pool game, held on 8 December 2006 at Stade Pierre Rajon in heavy rain forcing a pitch inspection, was against the yet-to-win Bourgoin. They led Bourgoin 28–3 at half time with three tries and penalties as well as two conversions. Although Bourgoin scored 10 points in the second half, Tigers won 28–13 and claimed their second victory in succession at an away venue. The return fixture at Welford Road eight days later saw Tigers defeat Bourgoin 57–3 with eight tries, seven conversions and one penalty. Tigers' second match against Cardiff Blues, this time at Welford Road on 13 January 2007, saw the side score six tries and two Ian Humphreys conversions in a 34–0 victory to set up a final match decider with Munster at Thomond Park the following week. Tigers beat Munster 13–6 to end Munster's 26-match unbeaten home record in the Heineken Cup and qualify for the quarter-finals.

In the quarter-finals, Tigers played Stade Français at home on 1 April 2007. Tigers took the lead inside three minutes when Seru Rabeni scored a try. Penalties from Stade's David Skrela and a Juan Martín Hernández try tied the match 11–11 at half-time. In the second half, Skrela scored a penalty from 35 metres (38 yd) to put Stade in the lead equalled by Andy Goode for Tigers seven minutes later. Skrela's subsequent penalty and drop kick from 40 metres (44 yd) put Stade 20–14 ahead. On 72 minutes, Tom Varndell scored a try under the goal post that was converted by Goode for Tigers to win 21–20 and make the semi-finals. In the semi-final held at Walkers Stadium on 21 April 2007, Tigers played Llanelli Scarlets. Tigers took a 16–10 lead before half-time through points all accumulated by Goode. In the second half, a Matthew Rees try converted by Stephen Jones gave Scarlets a 17–16 advantage. Tries by Shane Jennings and Louis Deacon that were each converted by Goode betwixt a Goode penalty saw Tigers win 33–17 and qualify for the final.

== Match ==
=== Pre-match ===
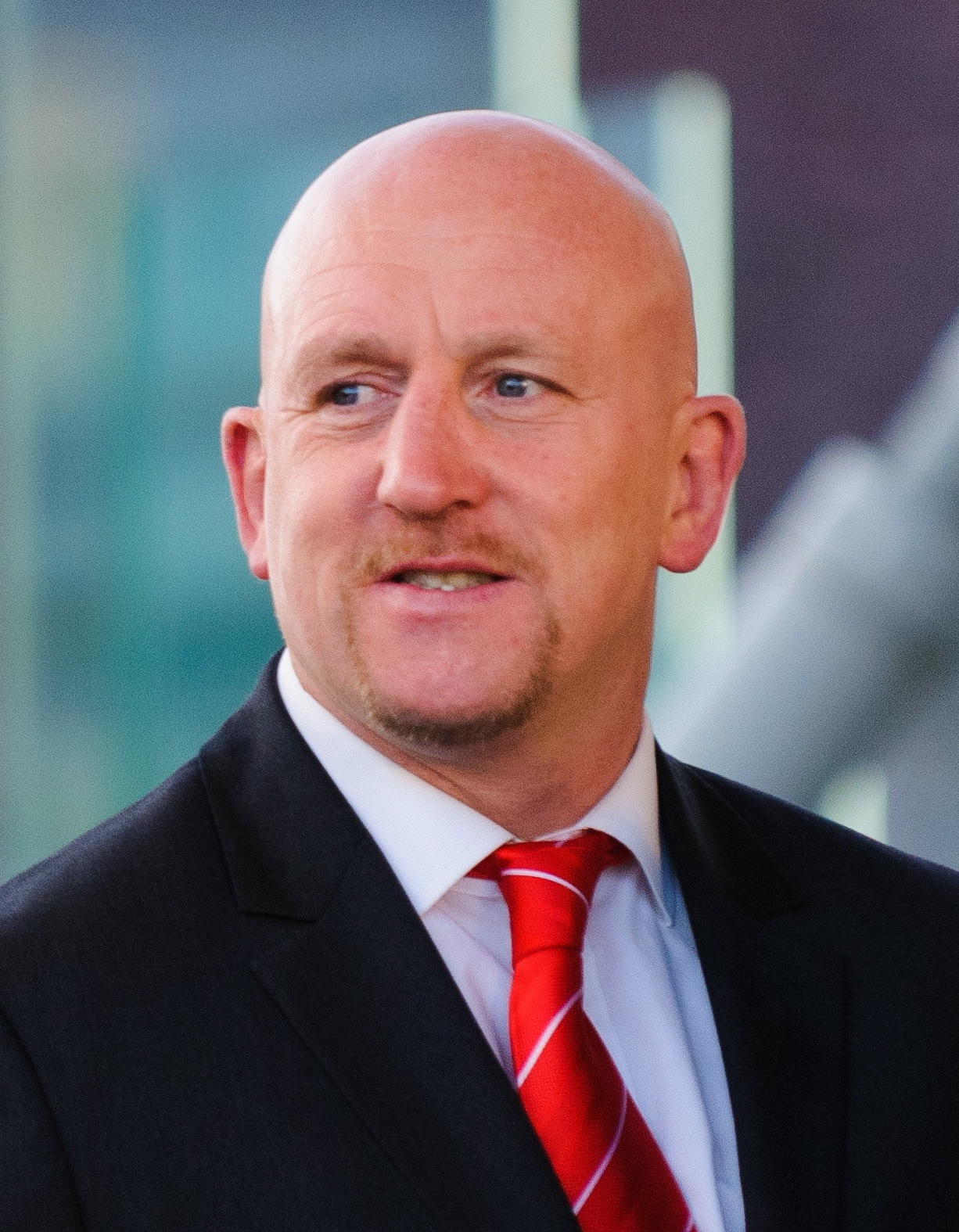
Shaun Edwards, a coach of London Wasps

In April 2006, European Rugby Cup (ERC), the organisers of the Heineken Cup, awarded the right to host the 2007 final to Twickenham Stadium in South West London. It was the third time the stadium had hosted the Heineken Cup final. Twickenham had previously staged the 2000 Heineken Cup Final between Northampton Saints and Munster, which Northampton won 9–8, and the 2004 Heineken Cup Final. The referee for the match was Alan Lewis, representing the Irish Rugby Football Union (IRFU). It would be the first time the 42-year-old Lewis would officiate a Heineken Cup final although he had refereed the European Challenge Cup finals of 2002 and 2005. Lewis' assistants were Alain Rolland, and Simon McDowell, also representing the IRFU. The fourth official was Peter Fitzgibbon, also from the IRFU. The IRFU's David McHugh was the television match official. Douglas Hunter and Richard McGhee of the Scotland Rugby Union (SRU) were the citing and match commissioners. Both clubs sold out their 9,500 ticket allocation distributed to their supporters. A total of 56,000 tickets were sold to the general public and 7,000 were allocated to ERC's European rugby stakeholders. The match was broadcast worldwide in more than 100 countries.

This was the last match for both coach Pat Howard and centre Daryl Gibson at Tigers, who were replaced by Marcelo Loffreda and Aaron Mauger respectively. Shaun Edwards, a Wasps coach, called the match "the biggest game ever between Wasps and Leicester and the biggest club rugby match ever in the world since the sport began 100 years ago" and that his team did not need internal motivation "because it's Wasps versus Leicester." He added: "If we allow ourselves to be bullied, we'll get what we deserve. If we can't handle Tuilagi or Seru Rabeni then we're in trouble." Paul Sackey, a winger for Wasps, said before the match that his team would be inspired by their 2006–07 Premiership Rugby final day defeat to Tigers and felt they could equal their physical strength: "Talking Leicester up is half a bonus for us because we're the underdogs. We're really disappointed we haven't got any silverware yet this year and that motivates us even more." Tigers captain Martin Corry did not wish to make a comparison with his team's Premiership win to potential events at Twickenham, saying: "We will enjoy the victory and enjoy lifting the trophy, but we will make sure that come Monday we're all focusing completely on Wasps."

Tigers were considered favourites to win the final by bookmakers. Wasps fly-half King had recovered from a knee and hamstring injury sustained on the final day of the Premiership Rugby season three weeks earlier to be selected amongst the club's starting lineup. Gibson was returned to the centre position, replacing Ollie Smith. Phil Vickery was due to move to loose head prop since no replacement was found for the injured Tim Payne, but instead played at tight head to accommodate the inclusion of Tom French, who replaced Peter Bracken in the front row. Josh Lewsey played in centre in place of Dominic Waldouck, who was put onto the substitutes bench. Tigers registered no scrum half covers for the fixture. They were without scrum half Harry Ellis who, during the 2006–07 Premiership Rugby semi-final, sustained an anterior cruciate ligament rupture in his left knee, requiring reconstructive surgery. Ian Humphreys was named to the substitutes bench in place of Ben Youngs, who was ineligible to play in European matches. The club were without Martín Castrogiovanni who was sidelined with a sprained right knee.

=== First half ===
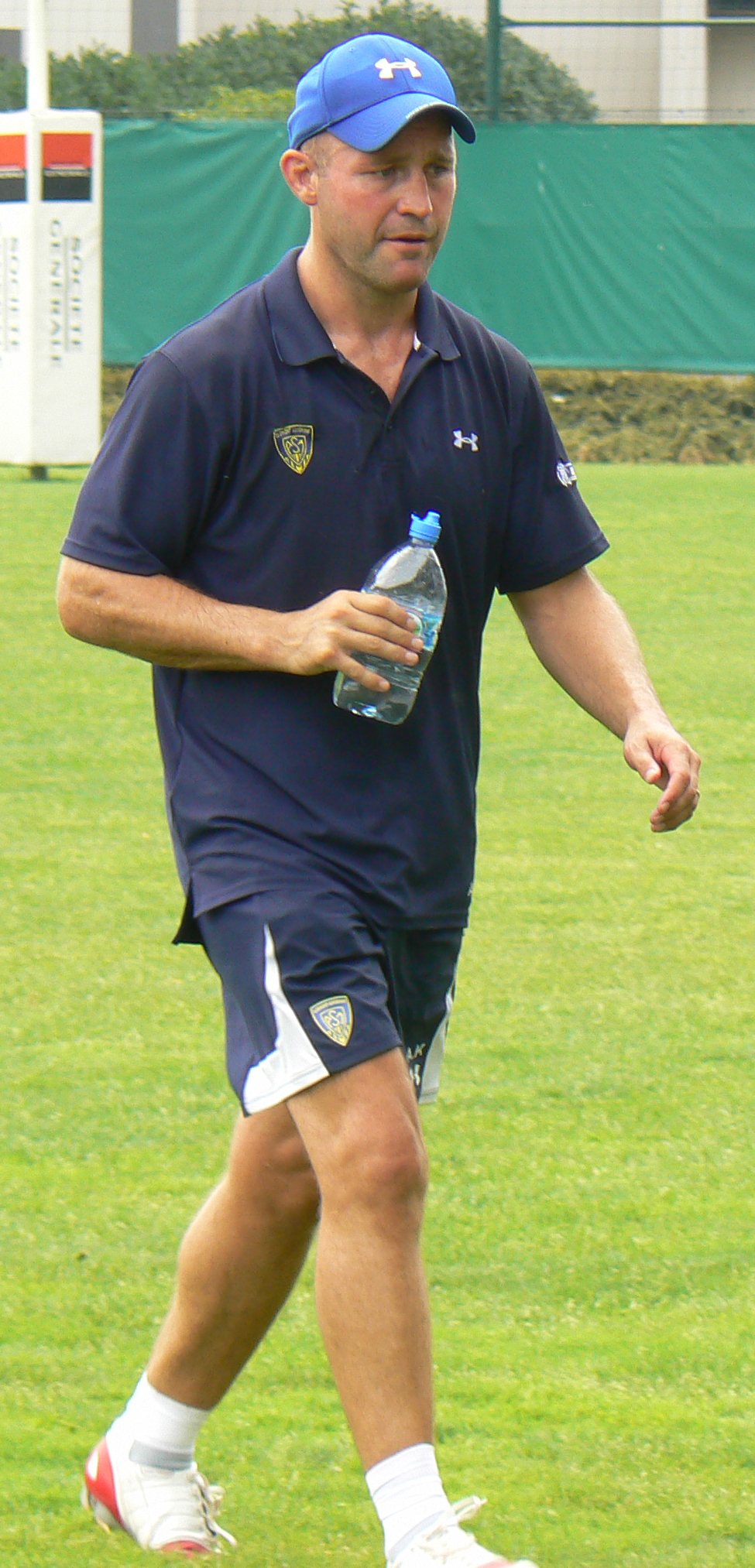
Alex King scored four penalties and one drop kick for Wasps

Goode commenced the match in hot weather at 14:30 British Summer Time (UTC+01:00) on 20 May 2007, in front of a crowd of 81,076 spectators, a world record crowd for a rugby union club fixture. (Note: The current record of 99,124 was set at the final of the 2015–16 Top 14 season.) After eight seconds, Tigers were awarded a turnover after Wasps' Lewsey fouled Frank Murphy. Wasps earned two penalties in quick succession due to infringements by Tigers. For each, King elected to attempt a kick at goal, and was successful in his second attempt slightly to the left of the goal from 22 metres (24 yd) on four minutes. The match was temporarily interrupted on five minutes when King needed treating following an attempted incorrect tackle on Lewis Moody. After seven minutes, Tigers earned a penalty kick after Lawrence Dallaglio was adjudged to have been on the incorrect side of the tackle area. Goode kicked the ball between the goal posts to equalise at 3–3. A third penalty was awarded to Wasps when Tigers were deemed to have come on the side. King's wide shot from the left struck the left upright of the goalpost. On 13 minutes, Raphaël Ibañez looked at his choice for a short-range line-out, and Reddan collected his underarm pass from a short distance. Reddan ran 20 metres (22 yd) unchallenged to the left-hand corner and scored a try to make it 8–3 to Wasps.

King's attempt to convert the try went across the posts. Two minutes later, Fraser Waters blocked Moody as the former tried to protect Joe Worsley at the kick-off in front of the referee and the goal posts. The result earned Tigers a penalty kick, which was scored by Goode for his second of the match to make it 8–6. Wasps received another penalty after 18 minutes when Corry was reprimanded by Lewis for not moving away from the ball. King's penalty kick was a weak effort from 45 metres (49 yd), giving him his third miss of the day. Play was stopped on 27 minutes due to a dispute between Vickery and Corry which was found to have been started by the former. Tigers earned a penalty in a five-metre scrum but Goode's kick went straight down the field. Ibañez passed low to Simon Shaw, who was near the five-metre line. Shaw returned the ball to Ibañez, who ran to the corner unchallenged and scored Wasps' second try to double their lead to 13–6 on 34 minutes. King was again unable to convert the try when the ball hit the goalposts at his fourth shot at goal. Four minutes later, Tigers earned a penalty kick when Tom Palmer committed an infraction at a ruck. Goode scored to complete a penalty hat-trick. No further points were scored and the first half ended with Wasps leading 13–9.

=== Second half ===
Neither side made changes to their lineup during the interval. Two minutes into the second half, Wasps increased their lead through a King penalty kick going between the posts from 30 metres (33 yd). This came after Alesana Tuilagi was observed holding the ball longer than allowed during a tackle. Another penalty was awarded on 44 minutes this time to Tigers but Goode's shot went wide. In the 48th minute, Sackey was gang-tackled by three Tigers players and needed treatment. Lewis observed Tuilagi committing a second infringement when the latter was offside in a ruck and the referee awarded Wasps a penalty in the 49th minute. King kicked to the right of the goal from 35 metres (38 yd) and scored his third penalty of the match to extend Wasps' lead to 19–9. On 50 minutes, Smith came on for Gibson in the centre at Tigers. Dallaglio picked up a left knee injury and was replaced by James Haskell a minute later. After 54 minutes, Vickery gathered the ball and allowed Tom Voyce to get a position that allowed King to make a drop kick from in front of the goal posts and increase Wasps' lead by three more points.

Wasps replaced Shaw with Daniel Leo in the 55th minute. Tuilagi went to fly-half and threw a high pass over Geordan Murphy's head before Dan Hipkiss broke through the Wasps defense and passed the ball to Smith, who then gave it to Corry. In the 62nd minute, Tigers brought Ian Humphreys on for Goode. In the 68th minute, Hipkiss passed to Tuilagi, who ran to within 10 metres (11 yd) on the left before he was tackled by Ciprani who was then supported by other Wasps players. The subsequent defensive scrum saw Haskell run 70 metres (77 yd) up the field before Humphreys tackled him 5 metres (5.5 yd) from the line. Tigers flankers were observed to be offside at the ruck, earning Wasps a penalty kick. King, kicking from the right, successfully scored his fourth penalty in the 73rd minute. In the concluding seven minutes, Tigers substituted four players and Wasps made five personnel issues but no further points were scored. Lewis blew the final whistle, with Wasps winning the match 25–9 and their second Heineken Cup.

=== Details ===
20 May 2007
14:30 BST

Leicester Tigers (England)	9–25	(England) London Wasps
Pen: Goode (3) 7', 15', 38'		Try: Reddan 13' m Ibañez 34' m Pen: King (4) 4', 42', 49', 73'; Drop: King 54'

Twickenham Stadium, London
Attendance: 81,076
Referee: Alan Lewis (Ireland)

Leicester Tigers	London Wasps

FB	15	(Ireland) Geordan Murphy	(substituted off) 77'
RW	14	(Fiji) Seru Rabeni
OC	13	(England) Danny Hipkiss
IC	12	(New Zealand) Daryl Gibson	(substituted off) 50'
LW	11	(Samoa) Alesana Tuilagi
FH	10	(England) Andy Goode	(substituted off) 62'
SH	9	(Ireland) Frank Murphy
N8	8	(England) Martin Corry (c)
OF	7	(Ireland) Shane Jennings
BF	6	(England) Lewis Moody	(substituted off) 77'
RL	5	(England) Ben Kay	(substituted off) 54'
LL	4	(England) Louis Deacon
TP	3	(England) Julian White
HK	2	(England) George Chuter	(substituted off) 78'
LP	1	(Argentina) Marcos Ayerza	(substituted off) 74'
Replacements:
HK	16	(England) James Buckland	(substituted in) 78'
PR	17	(Italy) Alex Moreno	(substituted in) 74'
LK	18	(Ireland) Leo Cullen	(substituted in) 54'
FL	19	(England) Brett Deacon	(substituted in) 77'
FH	20	(Ireland) Ian Humphreys	(substituted in) 62'
FH	21	(England) Sam Vesty	(substituted in) 77'
CE	22	(England) Ollie Smith	(substituted in) 50'
Coach:
(Australia) Pat Howard

FB	15	(England) Danny Cipriani
RW	14	(England) Paul Sackey
OC	13	(England) Fraser Waters	(substituted off) 77'
IC	12	(England) Josh Lewsey
LW	11	(England) Tom Voyce
FH	10	(England) Alex King	(substituted off) 74'
SH	9	(Ireland) Eoin Reddan	(substituted off) 78'
N8	8	(England) Lawrence Dallaglio (c)	(substituted off) 50'
OF	7	(England) Tom Rees
BF	6	(England) Joe Worsley
RL	5	(England) Tom Palmer
LL	4	(England) Simon Shaw	(substituted off) 55'
TP	3	(England) Phil Vickery	(substituted off) 74'
HK	2	(France) Raphaël Ibañez	(substituted off) 77'
LP	1	(England) Tom French
Replacements:
HK	16	(England) Joe Ward	(substituted in) 77'
PR	17	(Ireland) Peter Bracken	(substituted in) 74'
LK	18	(Samoa) Daniel Leo	(substituted in) 55'
FL	19	(England) James Haskell	(substituted in) 50'
SH	20	(Scotland) Mark McMillan	(substituted in) 78'
CE	21	(England) Dominic Waldouck	(substituted in) 77'
FB	22	(England) Mark van Gisbergen	(substituted in) 74'
Coach:
(Scotland) Ian McGeechan

Man of the Match:
Fraser Waters (London Wasps)

Assistant referees
Alain Rolland (Ireland)
Simon McDowell (Ireland)
Fourth official
Peter Fitzgibbon (Ireland)
Television match official
David McHugh (Ireland)
Citing commissioner
Douglas Hunter (Scotland)
Match commissioner
Richard McGhee (Scotland)

== Post-match ==
The Heineken Cup trophy was lifted by both Wasps captain Dallaglio and King following the presentation of runners-up medals to the Tigers side. Fraser was named man of the match but returned the glass vase presented to him because he did not want to damage it celebrating Wasps' victory on the pitch. Dallaglio commented on the victory: "Being underdogs pumps you up. We defended as if our lives depended on it. That was our greatest ever win in a final." He added: "Of all the finals that was number one without a doubt. Everyone was telling us that was the best Leicester team ever, so we must be the best Wasps team ever." Worsley noted the team had not been consistent all year "but on our day we're awesome". Wasps' head coach Ian McGeechan commented: "I don't know what the second team are going to say. They're the only team to have beaten the European champions." Ibañez remarked: "You can’t imagine how good it feels to have win the Heineken Cup with these guys – it is fantastic. Those two lineout tries were good weren’t they – two specials!"

Howard, who flew back to Australia to take over the family pharmacy business following a two-year spell as Tigers' coach, spoke of his team's failure to win the treble: "To do a treble is an amazing thing. You've got to turn up lots of times. For the first time, we let ourselves down today." He also noted Wasps' physicality and Tigers' slight loss of composure contributed to their defeat. Nevertheless, Howard declared he was "immensely proud" of the club and commented: "It's been pretty special this year, but we've let ourselves down today. I'll be down for an hour or so then I'm going to celebrate our two wins." Corry admitted Wasps' outplayed the Tigers but said fatigue played no part in their defeat, adding: "Those tries cost us the game. When you defend the line-out as fiercely as we do it leaves you vulnerable and Wasps found the holes. In the second half we gave everything. I saw that in the lads' eyes. As a captain and coach that's all you can ask for."

Wasps received £37,000 for winning the final. McGeechan criticised the prize money disparity in winning the Heineken Cup and being relegated from Premiership Rugby, saying: "At present, the system penalises Wasps when we give up a dozen players to Test rugby because under the current share-out of funds, we do not have the money to bring in new players. It's just not possible." Dallaglio raised concern over the level of financial investment and Wasps' resources, adding: "We need to go away and address the issues off the field and make sure we don't fail because of our lack of ability to compete at that level. We need to sort ourselves out and move forward. We need to compete with the likes of Leicester, Harlequins and Northampton who have great facilities."
