= 2007–08 Premiership Rugby =

Rugby union competition in England

2007–08 Guinness Premiership
- Countries: England
- Champions: London Wasps (6th title)
- Runners-up: Leicester Tigers
- Relegated: Leeds Carnegie
- Matches played: 135
- Attendance: 1,517,863 (average 11,243 per match)
- Top point scorer: (England) Andy Goode (207 points)
- Top try scorer: (England) Tom Varndell (14 tries)

The 2007–08 Guinness Premiership was the 21st season of the top flight of the English domestic rugby union competitions, played between September 2007 and May 2008. Round 1 included the London Double Header at Twickenham, between the four London teams.

Due to the 2007 Rugby World Cup the season started a week later than usual, as England were trying to defend their title. Leeds Tykes, which renamed themselves Leeds Carnegie shortly after the 2006–07 season, were promoted from National Division One 2006–07, taking the place of Northampton Saints who were relegated.

During the course of the season, London Wasps went from 10th in the league during October, to beat Leicester in the Guinness Premiership Final at Twickenham on 31 May 2008.

== Teams ==
Leeds Carnegie, having won the 2006–07 National Division One, replaced Northampton Saints, who were relegated last season after finishing bottom of the table.

2007–08 Guinness Premiership teams

| Club | Stadium | Capacity | City/Area |
|---|---|---|---|
| Bath | Recreation Ground | 10,600 | Bath, Somerset |
| Bristol | Memorial Stadium (Note: Bristol would also play 1 home game at Ashton Gate in Bristol on 2 March 2008) | 12,100 (Note: The capacity of the Memorial Stadium would rise from 11,916 to 12,100, with association football side Bristol Rovers achieving a crowd of 12,011 in a league fixture versus West Bromwich Albion on 9 March 2008.) | Bristol |
| Gloucester | Kingsholm | 16,500 | Gloucester, Gloucestershire |
| Harlequins | The Stoop (Note: Harlequins would also play 1 home game at Twickenham in London on 15 September 2007) | 12,638 | Twickenham, London |
| Leeds Carnegie | Headingley Stadium | 22,250 | Leeds, West Yorkshire |
| Leicester Tigers | Welford Road | 17,500 | Leicester, Leicestershire |
| London Irish | Madejski Stadium | 24,161 | Reading, Berkshire |
| London Wasps | Adams Park (Note: London Wasps would also play 1 home game at Twickenham in London on 15 September 2007) | 10,000 | High Wycombe, Buckinghamshire |
| Newcastle Falcons | Kingston Park | 10,200 | Newcastle upon Tyne, Tyne and Wear |
| Sale | Edgeley Park | 10,852 | Stockport, Greater Manchester |
| Saracens | Vicarage Road (Note: Saracens would also play 1 home game at Stadium mk in Milton Keynes on 10 May 2008) | 22,000 | Watford, Hertfordshire |
| Worcester | Sixways | 10,197 | Worcester, Worcestershire |

== Table ==
| Pos | Team | Pld | W | D | L | PF | PA | PD | TF | TA | TB | LB | Pts | Qualification |
|---|---|---|---|---|---|---|---|---|---|---|---|---|---|---|
| 1 | Gloucester (SF) | 22 | 15 | 0 | 7 | 551 | 377 | +174 | 65 | 39 | 7 | 7 | 74 | Play off place |
| 2 | London Wasps (C) | 22 | 14 | 2 | 6 | 599 | 459 | +140 | 67 | 49 | 7 | 3 | 70 | Play off place |
| 3 | Bath (SF) | 22 | 15 | 0 | 7 | 526 | 387 | +139 | 59 | 37 | 6 | 3 | 69 | Play off place |
| 4 | Leicester Tigers (F) | 22 | 13 | 0 | 9 | 539 | 428 | +111 | 58 | 40 | 6 | 6 | 64 | Play off place |
| 5 | Sale Sharks | 22 | 14 | 0 | 8 | 481 | 374 | +107 | 44 | 37 | 4 | 3 | 63 | |
| 6 | Harlequins | 22 | 12 | 0 | 10 | 480 | 440 | +40 | 53 | 49 | 7 | 8 | 63 | |
| 7 | London Irish | 22 | 13 | 0 | 9 | 433 | 382 | +51 | 44 | 37 | 2 | 5 | 59 | |
| 8 | Saracens | 22 | 11 | 0 | 11 | 533 | 525 | +8 | 58 | 58 | 3 | 5 | 52 | |
| 9 | Bristol | 22 | 7 | 1 | 14 | 393 | 473 | −80 | 40 | 52 | 3 | 5 | 37 (Note: Bristol Rugby deducted one point for fielding an ineligible player in the match against London Wasps on 22 December 2007.) | |
| 10 | Worcester Warriors | 22 | 6 | 2 | 14 | 387 | 472 | −85 | 48 | 47 | 1 | 7 | 36 | |
| 11 | Newcastle Falcons | 22 | 7 | 0 | 15 | 333 | 542 | −209 | 34 | 62 | 1 | 5 | 34 | |
| 12 | Leeds Carnegie (R) | 22 | 2 | 1 | 19 | 336 | 732 | −396 | 33 | 96 | 0 | 2 | 12 | Relegation place |

Source: www.guinnesspremiership.com
Rules for classification: If teams were level at any stage, tie-breakers applied in the following order:
1. Number of matches won
2. Difference between points scored and allowed
3. Total number of points scored
4. Aggregate number of points scored in matches between tied teams
5. Number of matches won excluding the first match, then the second and so on until the tie is settled
  Notes:

== Results ==
=== Round 1 ===
15 September 2007
14:15

| Bath | 29–15 | Worcester Warriors |

Recreation Ground
Attendance: 10,010

15 September 2007
15:30

| Harlequins | 35–27 | London Irish |

Twickenham
Attendance: 39,400

15 September 2007
18:00

| London Wasps | 19–29 | Saracens |

Twickenham
Attendance: 39,400

16 September 2007
15:00

| Bristol | 13–26 | Leicester Tigers |

Memorial Stadium
Attendance: 8,125

16 September 2007
15:00

| Leeds Carnegie | 24–49 | Gloucester |

Headingley
Attendance: 10,674

16 September 2007
15:00

| Newcastle Falcons | 33–12 | Sale Sharks |

Kingston Park
Attendance: 5,859

=== Round 2 ===
22 September 2007
15:00

| Leicester Tigers | 26–16 | Bath |

Welford Road
Attendance: 17,059

22 September 2007
17:00

| Harlequins | 39–15 | Leeds Carnegie |

Twickenham Stoop
Attendance: 7,459

22 September 2007
17:00

| Worcester Warriors | 24–24 | London Wasps |

Sixways
Attendance: 7,105

23 September 2007
15:00

| London Irish | 19–0 | Newcastle Falcons |

Madejski Stadium
Attendance: 6,800

23 September 2007
15:00

| Sale Sharks | 20–6 | Bristol |

Edgeley Park
Attendance: 6,402

23 September 2007
15:00

| Saracens | 31–38 | Gloucester |

Vicarage Road
Attendance: 6,976

=== Round 3 ===
29 September 2007
14:15

| Bath | 21–19 | Sale Sharks |

Recreation Ground
Attendance: 10,105

29 September 2007
18:00

| Gloucester | 29–7 | Worcester Warriors |

Kingsholm
Attendance: 15,781

29 September 2007
18:00

| Newcastle Falcons | 19–12 | Harlequins |

Kingston Park
Attendance: 6,478

30 September 2007
15:00

| Bristol | 14–11 | London Irish |

Memorial Stadium
Attendance: 6,751

30 September 2007
15:00

| Leeds Carnegie | 7–31 | Saracens |

Headingley
Attendance: 9,620

30 September 2007
15:00

| London Wasps | 17–20 | Leicester Tigers |

Adams Park
Attendance: 7,313

=== Round 4 ===
5 October 2007
19:45

| Sale Sharks | 16–0 | London Wasps |

Edgeley Park
Attendance: 7,368

5 October 2007
20:00

| London Irish | 20–22 | Bath |

Madejski Stadium
Attendance: 8,092

5 October 2007
20:00

| Newcastle Falcons | 21–19 | Leeds Carnegie |

Kingston Park
Attendance: 6,847

6 October 2007
16:00

| Harlequins | 24–18 | Bristol |

Twickenham Stoop
Attendance: 7,732

6 October 2007
17:00

| Worcester Warriors | 16–21 | Saracens |

Sixways
Attendance: 8,863

6 October 2007
18:00

| Leicester Tigers | 17–30 | Gloucester |

Welford Road
Attendance: 17,101

=== Round 5 ===
12 October 2007
20:00

| Leeds Carnegie | 26–21 | Worcester Warriors |

Headingley
Attendance: 4,516

13 October 2007
12:30

| Bath | 25–10 | Harlequins |

Recreation Ground
Attendance: 10,142

13 October 2007
15:00

| Gloucester | 31–12 | Sale Sharks |

Kingsholm
Attendance: 14,075

14 October 2007
15:00

| Bristol | 23–16 | Newcastle Falcons |

Memorial Stadium
Attendance: 6,829

14 October 2007
15:00

| London Wasps | 28–14 | London Irish |

Adams Park
Attendance: 6,629

14 October 2007
15:00

| Saracens | 26–19 | Leicester Tigers |

Vicarage Road
Attendance: 7,427

=== Round 6 ===
19 October 2007
19:45

| Sale Sharks | 34–30 | Saracens |

Edgeley Park
Attendance: 7,051

20 October 2007
15:00

| Harlequins | 26–25 | London Wasps |

Twickenham Stoop
Attendance: 10,115

20 October 2007
15:00

| Leicester Tigers | 28–20 | Worcester Warriors |

Welford Road
Attendance: 16,219

21 October 2007
14:00

| Newcastle Falcons | 20–33 | Bath |

Kingston Park
Attendance: 5,592

21 October 2007
15:00

| Bristol | 39–13 | Leeds Carnegie |

Memorial Stadium
Attendance: 6,439

21 October 2007
16:00

| London Irish | 15–10 | Gloucester |

Madejski Stadium
Attendance: 7,582

=== Round 7 ===
23 November 2007
20:00

| Worcester Warriors | 15–34 | Sale Sharks |

Sixways
Attendance: 10,197

24 November 2007
14:15

| Bath | 28–13 | Bristol |

Recreation Ground
Attendance: 10,600

24 November 2007
14:45

| Leeds Carnegie | 6–29 | Leicester Tigers |

Headingley
Attendance: 9,496

24 November 2007
15:00

| Gloucester | 27–25 | Harlequins |

Kingsholm
Attendance: 13,506

25 November 2007
15:00

| London Wasps | 35–12 | Newcastle Falcons |

Adams Park
Attendance: 9,502

25 November 2007
15:00

| Saracens | 24–20 | London Irish |

Vicarage Road
Attendance: 9,020

=== Round 8 ===
22 December 2007
14:15

| Bath | 41–10 | Leeds Carnegie |

Recreation Ground
Attendance: 10,600

22 December 2007
14:45

| Bristol | 23–23 | London Wasps |

Memorial Stadium
Attendance: 9,926

22 December 2007
15:00

| Harlequins | 20–27 | Saracens |

Twickenham Stoop
Attendance: 11,672

23 December 2007
14:45

| Sale Sharks | 20–14 | Leicester Tigers |

Edgeley Park
Attendance: 10,872

23 December 2007
15:00

| London Irish | 23–16 | Worcester Warriors |

Madejski Stadium
Attendance: 9,266

23 December 2007
15:00

| Newcastle Falcons | 13–20 | Gloucester |

Kingston Park
Attendance: 9,612

=== Round 9 ===
29 December 2007
14:45

| Leicester Tigers | 25–17 | London Irish |

Welford Road
Attendance: 17,498

29 December 2007
14:45

| London Wasps | 25–10 | Bath |

Adams Park
Attendance: 10,000

29 December 2007
15:00

| Gloucester | 27–0 | Bristol |

Kingsholm
Attendance: 16,500

29 December 2007
15:00

| Worcester Warriors | 7–10 | Harlequins |

Sixways
Attendance: 10,197

30 December 2007
15:00

| Leeds Carnegie | 20–34 | Sale Sharks |

Headingley
Attendance: 11,116

30 December 2007
16:00

| Saracens | 19–22 | Newcastle Falcons |

Vicarage Road
Attendance: 17,223

=== Round 10 ===
4 January 2008
20:00

| Bath | 10–5 | Gloucester |

Recreation Ground
Attendance: 10,600

5 January 2008
15:00

| London Wasps | 25–17 | Leeds Carnegie |

Adams Park
Attendance: 7,667

6 January 2008
13:15

| Harlequins | 13–42 | Leicester Tigers |

Twickenham Stoop
Attendance: 12,605

6 January 2008
15:00

| Bristol | 18–3 | Saracens |

Memorial Stadium
Attendance: 8,129

6 January 2008
15:00

| London Irish | 20–12 | Sale Sharks |

Madejski Stadium
Attendance: 9,744

6 January 2008
15:00

| Newcastle Falcons | 15–12 | Worcester Warriors |

Kingston Park
Attendance: 7,219

=== Round 11 ===
25 January 2008
20:00

| Sale Sharks | 20–13 | Harlequins |

Edgeley Park
Attendance: 10,216

26 January 2008
15:00

| Gloucester | 18–17 | London Wasps |

Kingsholm
Attendance: 16,200

26 January 2008
15:00

| Leicester Tigers | 41–14 | Newcastle Falcons |

Welford Road
Attendance: 17,498

26 January 2008
15:00

| Worcester Warriors | 25–5 | Bristol |

Sixways
Attendance: 9,822

27 January 2008
13:30

| Saracens | 26–20 | Bath |

Vicarage Road
Attendance: 9,952

27 January 2008
15:00

| Leeds Carnegie | 24–26 | London Irish |

Headingley
Attendance: 4,886

=== Rearranged fixtures ===
9 February 2008
15:00

| Gloucester | 13–20 | Leicester Tigers |

Kingsholm
Attendance: 12,597

10 February 2008
15:00

| Saracens | 19–6 | Worcester Warriors |

Vicarage Road
Attendance: 6,739

=== Round 12 ===
15 February 2008
19:45

| Sale Sharks | 29–3 | Leeds Carnegie |

Edgeley Park
Attendance: 8,006

16 February 2008
14:45

| Bath | 34–42 | London Wasps |

Recreation Ground
Attendance: 10,600

16 February 2008
15:00

| Harlequins | 36–15 | Worcester Warriors |

Twickenham Stoop
Attendance: 10,363

17 February 2008
13:45

| London Irish | 22–13 | Leicester Tigers |

Madejski Stadium
Attendance: 10,559

17 February 2008
15:00

| Bristol | 29–26 | Gloucester |

Memorial Stadium
Attendance: 11,418

17 February 2008
15:00

| Newcastle Falcons | 16–14 | Saracens |

Kingston Park
Attendance: 8,266

=== Round 13 ===
22 February 2008
20:00

| Worcester Warriors | 11–12 | London Irish |

Sixways
Attendance: 10,197

23 February 2008
15:00

| Gloucester | 28–20 | Newcastle Falcons |

Kingsholm
Attendance: 13,047

23 February 2008
15:00

| Leicester Tigers | 11–14 | Sale Sharks |

Welford Road
Attendance: 17,498

23 February 2008
15:00

| London Wasps | 32–30 | Bristol |

Adams Park
Attendance: 8,583

24 February 2008
15:00

| Leeds Carnegie | 15–34 | Bath |

Headingley
Attendance: 4,859

24 February 2008
18:05

| Saracens | 6–15 | Harlequins |

Vicarage Road
Attendance: 6,553

=== Round 14 ===
29 February 2008
19:45

| Sale Sharks | 15–22 | Worcester Warriors |

Edgeley Park
Attendance: 7,862

1 March 2008
13:30

| London Irish | 27–24 | Saracens |

Madejski Stadium
Attendance: 8,298

1 March 2008
14:45

| Harlequins | 30–25 | Gloucester |

Twickenham Stoop
Attendance: 12,638

1 March 2008
15:00

| Leicester Tigers | 34–21 | Leeds Carnegie |

Welford Road
Attendance: 17,002

2 March 2008
15:00

| Bristol | 9–19 | Bath |

Ashton Gate
Attendance: 16,234

=== Round 15 ===
8 March 2008
13:00

| Bath | 22–11 | Newcastle Falcons |

Recreation Ground
Attendance: 10,600

8 March 2008
15:00

| Worcester Warriors | 23–19 | Leicester Tigers |

Sixways
Attendance: 10,047

8 March 2008
17:30

| Gloucester | 34–14 | London Irish |

Kingsholm
Attendance: 12,354

9 March 2008
15:00

| Leeds Carnegie | 13–30 | Bristol |

Headingley
Attendance: 3,841

9 March 2008
15:00

| London Wasps | 29–25 | Harlequins |

Adams Park
Attendance: 10,000

9 March 2008
15:00

| Saracens | 24–20 | Sale Sharks |

Vicarage Road
Attendance: 8,712

=== Round 16 ===
14 March 2008
19:45

| Sale Sharks | 22–16 | Gloucester |

Edgeley Park
Attendance: 9,266

15 March 2008
15:00

| Leicester Tigers | 36–23 | Saracens |

Welford Road
Attendance: 17,071

16 March 2008
13:00

| Worcester Warriors | 10–10 | Leeds Carnegie |

Sixways
Attendance: 9,371

16 March 2008
15:00

| Harlequins | 22–16 | Bath |

Twickenham Stoop
Attendance: 11,196

16 March 2008
15:00

| London Irish | 16–22 | London Wasps |

Madejski Stadium
Attendance: 23,709

16 March 2008
15:00

| Newcastle Falcons | 8–28 | Bristol |

Kingston Park
Attendance: 6,088

=== Round 17 ===
21 March 2008
19:00

| Leeds Carnegie | 16–15 | Newcastle Falcons |

Headingley
Attendance: 8,917

22 March 2008
14:15

| Bath | 19–16 | London Irish |

Recreation Ground
Attendance: 10,600

23 March 2008
15:00

| Bristol | 15–28 | Harlequins |

Memorial Stadium
Attendance: 9,764

=== Round 18 ===
28 March 2008
19:45

| Sale Sharks | 22–6 | Bath |

Edgeley Park
Attendance: 9,068

29 March 2008
14:45

| Leicester Tigers | 19–24 | London Wasps |

Welford Road
Attendance: 17,498

29 March 2008
15:00

| Harlequins | 15–9 | Newcastle Falcons |

Twickenham Stoop
Attendance: 12,638

29 March 2008
15:00

| Worcester Warriors | 17–14 | Gloucester |

Sixways
Attendance: 10,197

30 March 2008
15:00

| London Irish | 28–8 | Bristol |

Madejski Stadium
Attendance: 7,573

30 March 2008
15:00

| Saracens | 66–7 | Leeds Carnegie |

Vicarage Road
Attendance: 5,896

=== Round 19 ===
11 April 2008
19:30

| Bristol | 17–24 | Sale Sharks |

Memorial Stadium
Attendance: 8,178

12 April 2008
12:35

| Gloucester | 39–15 | Saracens |

Kingsholm
Attendance: 12,300

12 April 2008
15:00

| London Wasps | 49–12 | Worcester Warriors |

Adams Park
Attendance: 8,138

13 April 2008
15:00

| Leeds Carnegie | 6–32 | Harlequins |

Headingley
Attendance: 3,854

13 April 2008
15:00

| Newcastle Falcons | 8–13 | London Irish |

Kingston Park
Attendance: 7,484

=== Rearranged fixtures ===
15 April 2008
19:30

| London Wasps | 29–19 | Sale Sharks |

Adams Park
Attendance: 9,823

15 April 2008
20:00

| Bath | 26–12 | Leicester Tigers |

Recreation Ground
Attendance: 10,600

=== Round 20 ===
19 April 2008
14:45

| London Irish | 13–6 | Harlequins |

Madejski Stadium
Attendance: 10,324

19 April 2008
15:00

| Gloucester | 39–16 | Leeds Carnegie |

Kingsholm
Attendance: 11,753

19 April 2008
15:00

| Leicester Tigers | 32–14 | Bristol |

Welford Road
Attendance: 17,324

19 April 2008
15:00

| Worcester Warriors | 20–23 | Bath |

Sixways
Attendance: 10,049

20 April 2008
15:00

| Saracens | 29–40 | London Wasps |

Vicarage Road
Attendance: 13,210

20 April 2008
15:30

| Sale Sharks | 53–10 | Newcastle Falcons |

Edgeley Park
Attendance: 10,134

=== Round 21 ===
3 May 2008
15:00

| Bristol | 21–22 | Worcester Warriors |

Memorial Stadium
Attendance: 9,127

3 May 2008
18:00

| Bath | 66–21 | Saracens |

Recreation Ground
Attendance: 10,600

4 May 2008
15:00

| Harlequins | 16–23 | Sale Sharks |

Twickenham Stoop
Attendance: 12,638

4 May 2008
15:00

| London Irish | 43–20 | Leeds Carnegie |

Madejski Stadium
Attendance: 7,502

4 May 2008
15:00

| London Wasps | 17–25 | Gloucester |

Adams Park
Attendance: 10,000

4 May 2008
15:00

| Newcastle Falcons | 28–25 | Leicester Tigers |

Kingston Park
Attendance: 9,184

=== Rearranged fixture ===
7 May 2008
20:00

| Newcastle Falcons | 13–32 | London Wasps |

Kingston Park
Attendance: 10,200

=== Round 22 ===
10 May 2008
15:00

| Gloucester | 8–6 | Bath |

Kingsholm
Attendance: 16,500

10 May 2008
15:00

| Leeds Carnegie | 28–45 | London Wasps |

Headingley
Attendance: 7,842

10 May 2008
15:00

| Leicester Tigers | 31–28 | Harlequins |

Welford Road
Attendance: 17,498

10 May 2008
15:00

| Sale Sharks | 7–17 | London Irish |

Edgeley Park
Attendance: 10,252

10 May 2008
15:00

| Saracens | 25–20 | Bristol |

Stadium:mk
Attendance: 8,050

10 May 2008
15:00

| Worcester Warriors | 51–10 | Newcastle Falcons |

Sixways
Attendance: 10,197

== Play-offs ==
=== Semi-finals ===
18 May 2008
14:00

| London Wasps | 21–10 | Bath |

Adams Park
Attendance: 10,000

18 May 2008
16:30

| Gloucester | 25–26 | Leicester Tigers |

Kingsholm
Attendance: 16,500

=== Final ===
31 May 2008
15:00

| London Wasps | 26–16 | Leicester Tigers |
| Try: Rees 12' c Lewsey 37' c Con: Van Gisbergen (2/2); Pen: Van Gisbergen 6', 24', 35', 72' | Report 1 Report 2 | Try: Varndell 56' m Ellis 62' m Pen: Goode 9', 29' |

Twickenham Stadium, London
Attendance: 81,600
Referee: Wayne Barnes

Team details

London Wasps
Leicester Tigers

| FB | 15 | (England) Mark van Gisbergen |
| RW | 14 | (England) Paul Sackey |
| OC | 13 | (England) Fraser Waters |
| IC | 12 | (England) Dominic Waldouck | (substituted off) 79' |
| LW | 11 | (England) Josh Lewsey |
| FH | 10 | (England) Riki Flutey |
| SH | 9 | (Ireland) Eoin Reddan | (substituted off) 79' |
| N8 | 8 | (England) Lawrence Dallaglio (c) | (substituted off) 67' |
| OF | 7 | (England) Tom Rees |
| BF | 6 | (England) James Haskell |
| RL | 5 | (England) Tom Palmer | (substituted off) 79' |
| LL | 4 | (England) Simon Shaw |
| TP | 3 | (England) Phil Vickery | (substituted off) 41' |
| HK | 2 | (France) Raphaël Ibañez | (substituted off) 61' |
| LP | 1 | (England) Tim Payne | (substituted off) 61' |
Replacements:
| HK | 16 | (New Zealand) Joe Ward | (substituted on) 61' |
| PR | 17 | (South Africa) Pat Barnard | (substituted on) 41' |
| LK | 18 | (England) Richard Birkett | (substituted on) 79' |
| FL | 19 | (England) Joe Worsley | (substituted on) 61' |
| SH | 20 | (Scotland) Mark McMillan | (substituted on) 79' |
| FH | 21 | (Ireland) Jeremy Staunton | (substituted on) 79' |
| N8 | 22 | (England) John Hart | (substituted on) 67' |
Coach:
(Scotland) Ian McGeechan

| FB | 15 | (Ireland) Geordan Murphy |
| RW | 14 | (England) Tom Varndell |
| OC | 13 | (England) Dan Hipkiss | | (substituted off) 41' |
| IC | 12 | (New Zealand) Aaron Mauger | | (substituted off) 23' | (substituted on) 26' |
| LW | 11 | (Samoa) Alesana Tuilagi |
| FH | 10 | (England) Andy Goode |
| SH | 9 | (England) Harry Ellis | | (substituted off) 80' |
| N8 | 8 | (England) Jordan Crane |
| OF | 7 | (New Zealand) Ben Herring | | (substituted off) 56' |
| BF | 6 | (England) Martin Corry (c) |
| RL | 5 | (England) Ben Kay |
| LL | 4 | (South Africa) Marco Wentzel | | (substituted off) 54' |
| TP | 3 | (England) Julian White |
| HK | 2 | (Wales) Mefin Davies | | (substituted off) 46' |
| LP | 1 | (England) Boris Stankovich | | (substituted off) 56' |
Replacements:
| HK | 16 | (France) Benjamin Kayser | | (substituted on) 46' |
| PR | 17 | (Argentina) Marcos Ayerza | | (substituted on) 56' |
| LK | 18 | (England) Richard Blaze | | (substituted on) 54' |
| FL | 19 | (England) Tom Croft | | (substituted on) 56' |
| SH | 20 | (France) Christophe Laussucq | | (substituted on) 80' |
| FH | 21 | (England) Sam Vesty |
| CE | 22 | (England) Ayoola Erinle | (substituted on) 23' | (substituted off) 26' | (substituted on) 41' |
Coach:
(Argentina) Marcelo Loffreda

== Top scorers ==
Note: Flags to the left of player names indicate national team as has been defined under World Rugby eligibility rules, or primary nationality for players who did not earn international senior caps. Players may hold one or more non-WR nationalities.

=== Most points ===
| Rank | Name | Club | Points |
|---|---|---|---|
| 1 | (England) Andy Goode | Leicester Tigers | 207 |
| 2 | (England) Charlie Hodgson | Sale Sharks | 201 |
| 3 | (England) Danny Cipriani | London Wasps | 192 |
| 4 | (New Zealand) Glen Jackson | Saracens | 179 |
| 5 | (England) Olly Barkley | Bath Rugby | 178 |
| 6 | (England) Ryan Lamb | Gloucester Rugby | 169 |
| 7 | (Argentina) Alberto Di Bernardo | Leeds Carnegie | 127 |
| 8 | (Australia) Shane Drahm | Worcester Warriors | 118 |
| 9 | (England) Adrian Jarvis | Harlequins | 115 |
| 10 | (Australia) Chris Malone | Harlequins | 107 |

=== Most tries ===
| Rank | Player | Club | Tries |
|---|---|---|---|
| 1 | (England) Tom Varndell | Leicester Tigers | 14 |
| 2 | (England) Matt Banahan | Bath Rugby | 10 |
| 2 | (England) James Simpson-Daniel | Gloucester Rugby | 10 |
| 4 | (England) Miles Benjamin | Worcester Rugby | 9 |
| 4 | (England) Lesley Vainikolo | Gloucester Rugby | 9 |
| 6 | (England) Ben Foden | Sale Sharks | 8 |
| 6 | (England) Tom Voyce | London Wasps | 8 |
| 8 | (England) Tom Arscott | Bristol | 7 |
| 8 | (England) Tom Biggs | Leeds Carnegie | 7 |
| 8 | (England) Tom May | Newcastle Falcons | 7 |
| 8 | (England) Adam Powell | Saracens | 7 |
| 8 | (England) Paul Sackey | London Wasps | 7 |
| 8 | (England) Fraser Waters | London Wasps | 7 |
