= James Haskell =

England international rugby union player (born 1985)

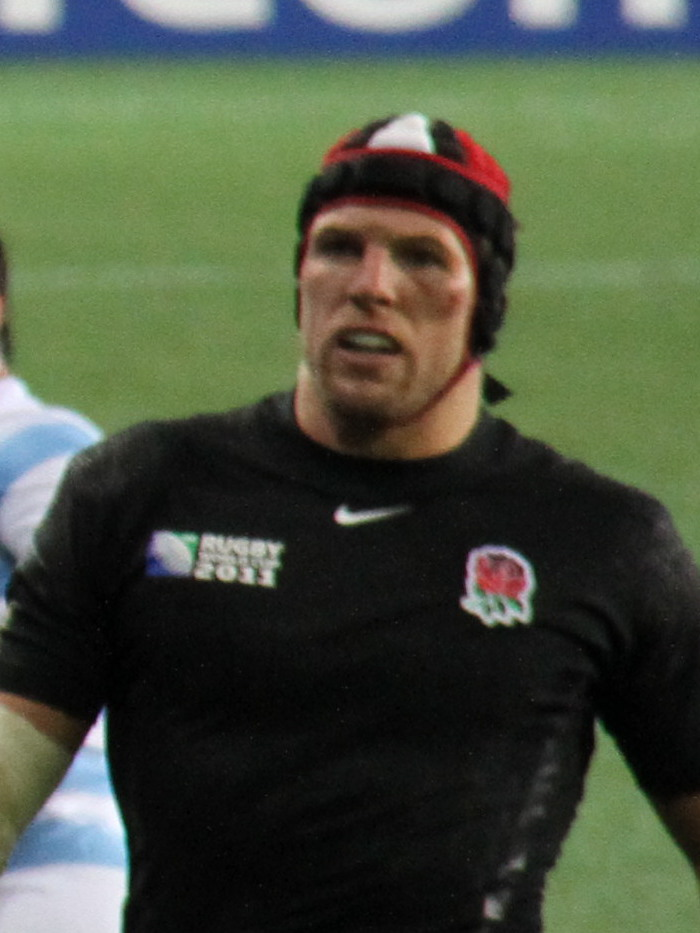
- Argentina vs England at 2011 Rugby World Cup
- Born: James Andrew Welbon Haskell; 2 April 1985 (age 41) Windsor, Berkshire, England
- Height: 6 ft 4 in (1.93 m)
- Weight: 112 kg (247 lb; 17 st 9 lb)
- School: Papplewick School, Ascot; Wellington College

Rugby union career
- Position(s): Flanker, Number eight
Youth career
- Wasps Academy
Senior career
Years	Team	Apps	(Points)
2002–2009	London Wasps	92	(70)
2009–2011	Stade Français	48	(35)
2011–2012	Ricoh Black Rams	11	(5)
2012–2013	Highlanders	12	(0)
2013–2018	Wasps	118	(30)
2018–2019	Northampton Saints	5	(0)
- Correct as of 29 March 2020
International career
Years	Team	Apps	(Points)
2007–2019	Saxons	22	(15)
2007–2019	England	77	(20)
2017	British & Irish Lions		
- Correct as of 17 March 2018
National sevens team
Years	Team		Comps
2006	England		Dubai

James Andrew Welbon Haskell (born 2 April 1985) is an English former rugby union player who played chiefly as a flanker for Wasps RFC and Northampton Saints in the Aviva Premiership, and internationally for England.

In November 2019, it was announced that Haskell would be participating in the nineteenth series of I'm a Celebrity...Get Me Out of Here!.

== Early life ==
James Andrew Welbon Haskell was born on 2 April 1985 in Windsor, Berkshire.

He was educated at Papplewick School in Ascot, Berkshire and Wellington College in Crowthorne, also in Berkshire.

== Club career ==
Haskell played for Maidenhead prior to joining Wasps, where he was part of the highly successful Colts set up. He was a replacement as Wasps won the 2007 Heineken Cup Final. The following season, he started as Wasps won the 2007–08 Premiership Final. It was announced on 17 February 2009 that Haskell would join Top 14 side Stade Français Paris at the end of the 2008–09 season.

Haskell played as a loose forward. He announced at the end of the 2010–11 season that he had been released from his contract at Stade Français Paris, and would instead be rejoining Wasps at the start of the 2012–13 season. During the season after the World Cup, he would play in Japan for the Rams.

In 2011, Haskell agreed to join the Highlanders in Super Rugby, saying he has always wanted to play in new environments and to "improve and become a better player for England". While there, Haskell was competing for the Flanker position with future Scotland international, John Hardie.

In January 2018, it was announced he would leave Wasps at the end of the 2017–18 season.

On 7 May 2019, Haskell announced his retirement from professional rugby via an Instagram post.

== International career ==
=== England ===
Haskell represented England at under-17, 18 and under-19 levels as well as playing for England Sevens. He also played for Wales at under-18 level, qualifying thanks to his Welsh mother, and is also qualified to play for Ireland. In the 2007 Six Nations, Haskell was called into the starting line-up for the final game of the tournament for England against Wales at the Millennium Stadium in Cardiff, where he was part of a back row that was for the first time provided by one club - Joe Worsley and Tom Rees were the other players from Wasps. He just missed out on selection for the 2007 Rugby World Cup for England, despite spending the summer in their training camp. He played a prominent role in the England team in the 2008 Six Nations. Haskell appeared in both tests of the 2008 summer tour of New Zealand.

Haskell was selected by Martin Johnson for the 2008/2009 Elite Player Squad on 1 July 2008. He appeared in all three autumn internationals, starting against South Africa. Haskell participated in every game of the 2009 Six Nations, though he lost his starting berth to Tom Croft.

Haskell's performances for Stade and injury to Tom Croft meant he returned to the England squad, and he scored two tries against Wales in the first match of the 2010 Six Nations. He started all subsequent games. During a rest week in the Six Nations, Stade requested his return to Paris to face Toulouse that weekend. The RFU held firm, however, and he remained in England.

Haskell was a member of Stuart Lancaster's 31-man squad for the 2015 Rugby World Cup, however, he was left on the bench in favour of Tom Wood as England crashed out in the group stages.

Haskell was named as the 'man of the series' during England's 3–0 series victory over Australia in June 2016.

=== British & Irish Lions ===
On 21 May 2017, Haskell was called up to the British & Irish Lions due to an injury to Billy Vunipola.

== MMA career ==
In August 2019, Haskell signed to mixed martial arts promotion Bellator MMA as part of its Heavyweight division. Haskell had previously done analysis and commentary work for English promotions such as BAMMA and CFF.

In February 2020, it was announced that Haskell would make his professional mixed martial arts debut on 16 May 2020 at Wembley's SSE Arena. The event was ultimately postponed due to the Coronavirus outbreak.

After having numerous injuries still stemming from his rugby career and eventually having spinal surgery in September 2021, Haskell decided to forgo his MMA career.

== Personal life ==
Haskell was married to television presenter Chloe Madeley; the couple started dating in 2014. Haskell announced on Good Morning Britain in February 2022 that he and his wife Chloe were expecting a baby girl. Their daughter was born in August 2022. In October 2023, they announced they were separating.

Haskell was suspended from Wellington College for producing a non-consensual film showing his friend Paul Doran-Jones having sex with his then girlfriend in school accommodation using a hidden camera. The tape was stolen by the girl in the video. Doran-Jones was expelled and Haskell suspended for the incident. Haskell later made light of the incident in a YouTube podcast in 2019 joking, "All I am going to say is this. My idea, Paul was execution" and "I was nothing to do with it apart from, obviously, it was my idea".

In 2011, Haskell was accused of sexually harassing a hotel worker alongside fellow England players Dylan Hartley and Chris Ashton.

James is also a DJ playing house music and producing his own music. He has built up a reputation having played around the world in places such as London, Dubai, Ibiza and Loughborough. He has a series for the renowned house label Defected Records called Backrow Beats.

In November 2019, it was announced that Haskell would be participating in the nineteenth series of I'm a Celebrity...Get Me Out of Here!'. He ultimately became the fourth person to be voted off.

== Bibliography ==
- Payne, Alex; Haskell, James; Tindall, Mike (2024). The Good, the Bad & the Rugby – Unleashed. HarperCollins UK. ISBN 9780008712709.
