= Daniel Leo (rugby union) =

Samoa international rugby union player

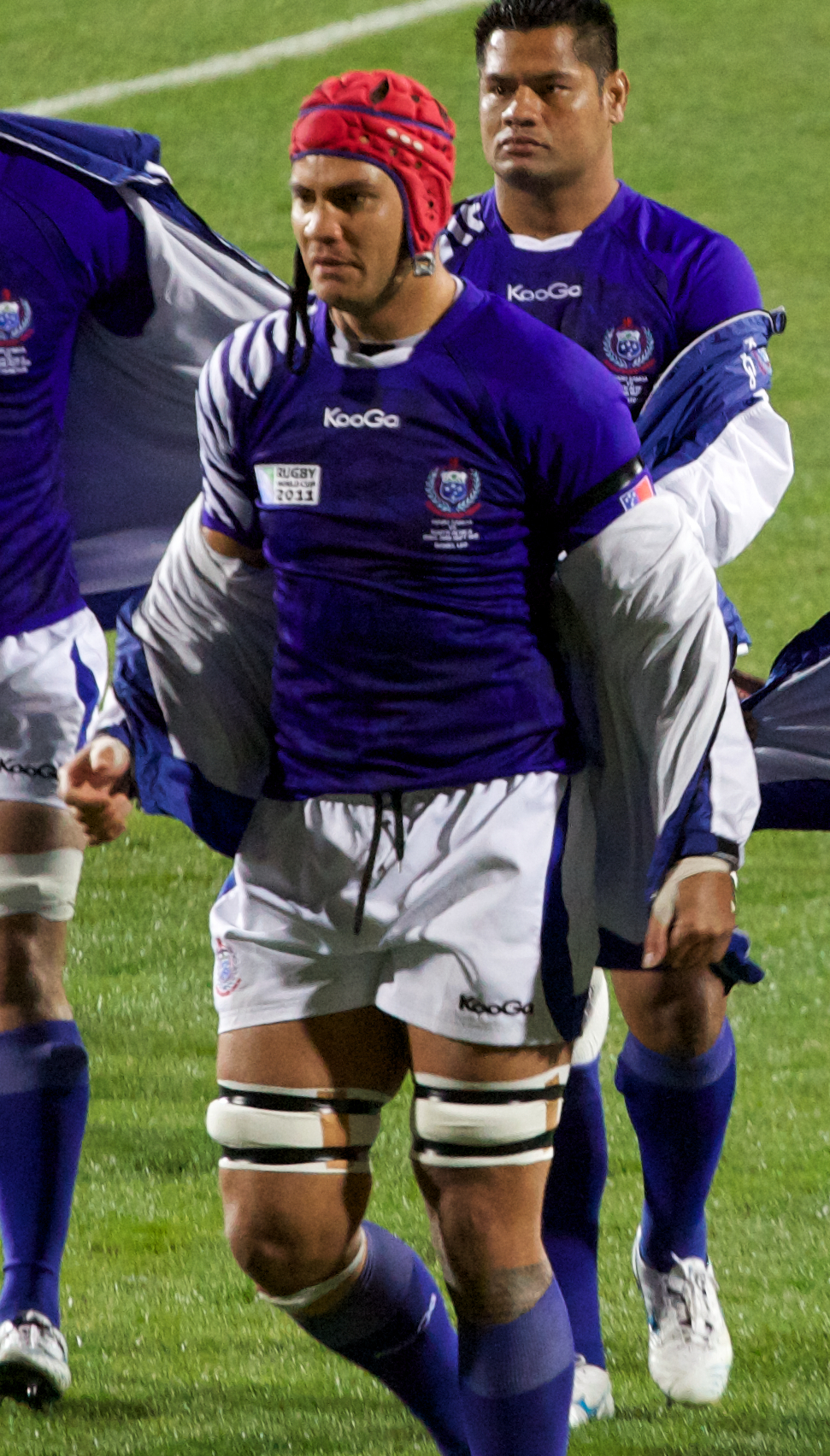
- Full name: Daniel Leo
- Born: 2 October 1982 (age 44) Palmerston North, New Zealand
- Height: 1.98 m (6 ft 6 in)
- Weight: 112 kg (17 st 9 lb; 247 lb)
- School: Auckland Grammar School

Rugby union career
- Position: Lock
Senior career
Years	Team	Apps	(Points)
2003-2004	Queensland Reds	87	(35)
2005–2010	London Wasps	87	(35)
2010–2012	Bordeaux Bègles	43	(5)
2012–2014	USA Perpignan	51	(5)
2014–2015	London Irish	18	(5)
2015–2016	London Welsh	7	(0)
- Correct as of 26 November 2014
International career
Years	Team	Apps	(Points)
2005–2014	Samoa	39	(0)
2006	Pacific Islanders	3	(5)
- Correct as of 26 November 2014

Daniel Azor Leo (born 2 October 1982) is a rugby union player and the current head coach at Brisbane Boys' College. Born in New Zealand to Samoan parents, he won 39 caps for Samoa between 2005 and 2014. He can play in the second row or as a back row forward.

== Early life ==
Leo was born in Palmerston North, New Zealand, and moved to Australia when he was 18. He played for Sunnybank in the Queensland Competition, as well as the Queensland Reds.

== Club career ==
After making his debut for Samoa in 2005, he was not eligible to play for an Australian Super 12 franchise, so moved to London Wasps. He was a replacement as Wasps won the 2007 Heineken Cup Final.

He later had spells with Bordeaux Begles and USA Perpignan in the Top 14, and London Irish in the Aviva Premiership.

On 21 May 2015, Leo signed for London Welsh for the 2015-16 RFU Championship season. He moved to London Cornish for 2016–17 as Player/Coach in London 2 South-West, where he helped the club to the title in an unbeaten season. In 2017-18 he moved to Bishops Stortford RFC in National League 1, before returning to London Cornish for the 2018–19 season.

== International career ==
Leo made his international debut for Samoa at the Telstra Stadium in Sydney against Australia in June 2005. He was included in the Pacific Islanders squad that toured Europe in late 2006. He was also selected in the Samoa squad for the 2007 Rugby World Cup and the 2011 Rugby World Cup. He went on to represent Samoa 39 times, and retired from international rugby on 28 May 2015, just 4 months before the 2015 Rugby World Cup.
