= Danny Cipriani =

England rugby union player (born 1987)

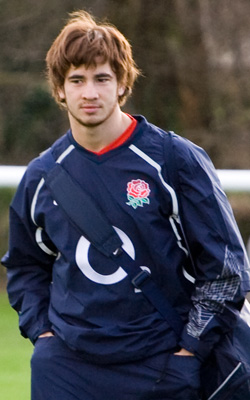
- Cipriani in pre-2008 Six Nations
- Born: 2 November 1987 (age 39) Roehampton, London, England
- Height: 6 ft 1 in (1.85 m)
- Weight: 92 kg (14 st 7 lb; 203 lb)

Rugby union career
- Position(s): Fly-half, Fullback, Centre
Senior career
Years	Team	Apps	(Points)
2006–2010	Wasps	93	(688)
2011–2012	Melbourne Rebels	19	(122)
2012–2016	Sale Sharks	102	(794)
2016–2018	Wasps	51	(144)
2018–2020	Gloucester	44	(128)
2021–2022	Bath	15	(53)
- Correct as of 27 June 2022
International career
Years	Team	Apps	(Points)
2008–2018	England	16	(64)

Danny Cipriani (Italian pronunciation: [tʃiˈprjaːni] (/sɪpriˈɑːni/; born 2 November 1987) is an English former professional rugby union player. He most recently played for Premiership Rugby side Bath and previously played for Gloucester, Sale Sharks and Wasps in the Premiership and Melbourne Rebels in Super Rugby. He plays fly-half and fullback. He has also played for England. Since starting in the Wasps academy in 2003, Cipriani has been capped for England 16 times.

== Early life and career ==
Cipriani went first to Donhead Preparatory School in Wimbledon, London. Spotted as a rugby talent at Donhead, he was offered a full scholarship and was then advised to move to the Junior House of The Oratory School near Reading in order for him to continue his development. He later moved to Whitgift School in Croydon after Common Entrance.

A keen all-round sportsman, Cipriani played junior football for Queens Park Rangers and was offered youth terms by Reading. He also played schoolboy cricket for Berkshire and Oxfordshire. He was invited to join Surrey County Cricket Club as a batsman. He also played squash at county level. He first played club rugby at Rosslyn Park in Roehampton, where he developed his passion for the game. A former coach, Tony Durrant, described him as "precocious". Cipriani himself has given credit to the youth level coaches that encouraged his flamboyant playstyle. He also acknowledges local hero Bobby Walsh for taking a special interest in his development at the club.

== Club career ==
=== Wasps ===
Cipriani joined Wasps Academy in 2003, and made his debut against Bristol aged 17 in December 2004 in the Powergen Cup. Cipriani joined the Wasps Academy full-time in the 2006–07 season. He initially played for Wasps under-21 team and Wasps A team before making more regular appearances for the first team in 2007. He started as Wasps won the 2007 Heineken Cup Final.

After Alex King left Wasps in the summer of 2007, the fly-half position at the club became vacant, and, after playing in a series of positions for Wasps in the early games of the 2007–08 season Cipriani played two games in an at fly-half, against Gloucester and Munster, Wasps winning both.

He is quicker over 69 metres than Paul Sackey and this story was confirmed by their sprinting coach.

On 6 October 2008, Cipriani was involved in a bust-up with club and international teammate Josh Lewsey in a training ground fight. Cipriani was left nursing a bloody nose and cut lip following the incident at Wasps' training ground. The spat started after Lewsey accused Cipriani of missing several tackles during a full-contact session.

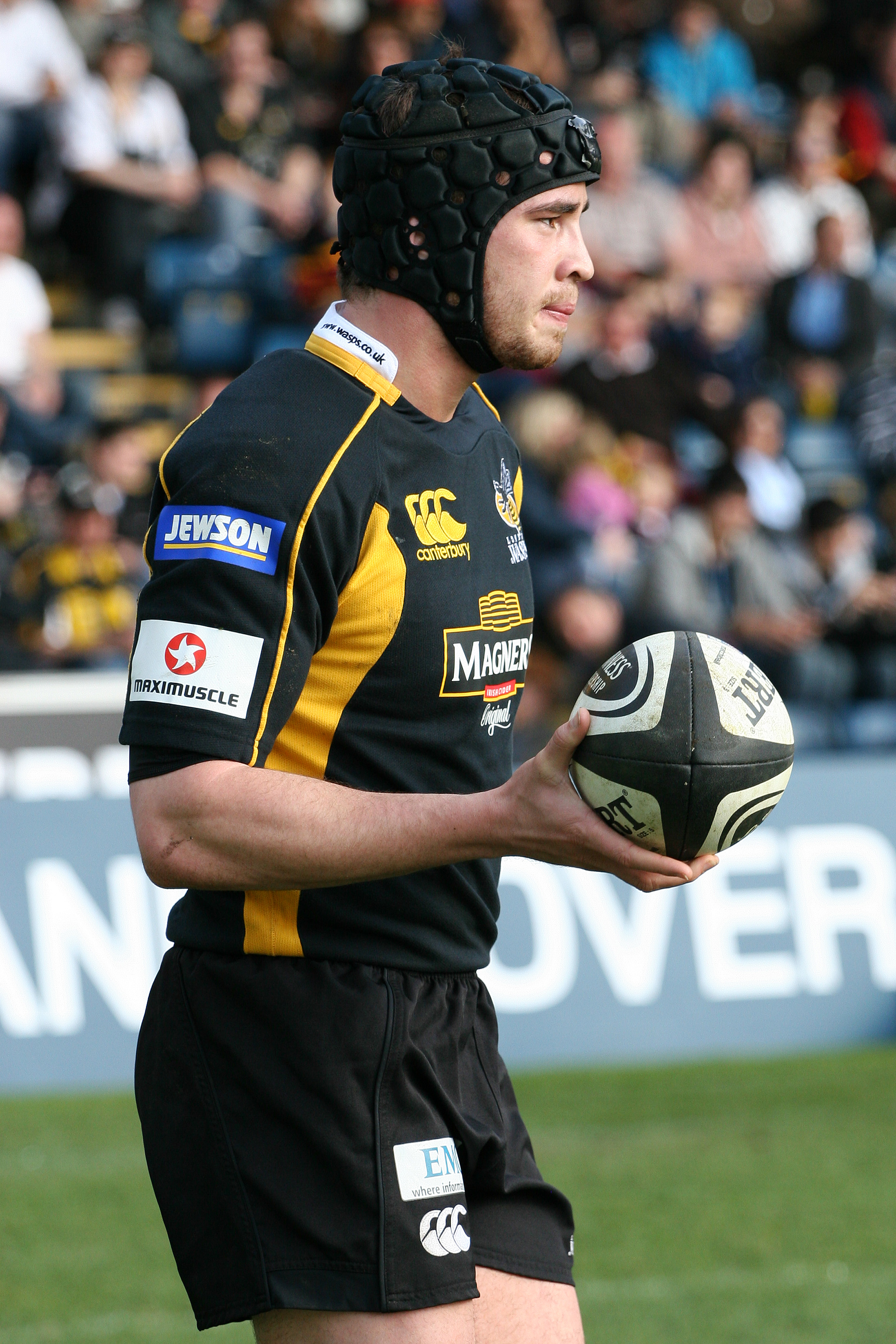
Cipriani playing for Wasps against Bristol in 2009

On 18 May 2008, Cipriani suffered a fracture dislocation of his right ankle during Wasps semi-final play-off victory over Bath. Cipriani was tackled by Olly Barkley and got trapped at the bottom of a ruck in the 49th minute at Adams Park. He was ruled out of England's tour of New Zealand due to his ankle fracture. The injury also ruled him out of Wasps' victory in the 2007–08 Premiership final.

Cipriani made his return to Wasps in a Premiership match against Bath on 1 October 2008. His recovery was described as remarkable, given the severity of the injury, and his return was six weeks to two months ahead of schedule. His sprint coach Margot Wells has been quoted as saying that due to Cipriani's superb attitude and hard work, he will return 'stronger in the tackle, fitter and faster than before'.

Following an injury to Jonny Wilkinson, Cipriani regained the England number 10 shirt for the 2008 Autumn Internationals. He was then dropped following two poor displays in defeat to South Africa and Australia. Much was also made of his high-profile relationship with model Kelly Brook and concerns were raised by critics about whether he was fully committed to rugby.

Cipriani enjoyed a good start to the 2009–10 season with Wasps, only to injure himself in a match against Northampton Saints, a match in which he incidentally scored his first try of the season. This injury ruled him out of the Autumn Internationals for England. It would be two months before he made his comeback playing in a Wasps A game against Harlequins, 7 December, playing for 40 minutes.

Cipriani played his last home match for London Wasps on 1 May 2010 against Cardiff Blues in the Amlin Challenge Cup semi-final.

=== Melbourne Rebels ===
In February 2010, Wasps announced Cipriani would join the Melbourne Rebels. Rebels' Coach Rod Macqueen said, "Danny Cipriani is ... coming for all the right reasons. [He] is on the right path to the culture we are after." In England, there was speculation about Cipriani's chances of English selection for the 2011 Rugby World Cup. While England's manager Martin Johnson said he would not select Cipriani if he moved to the southern hemisphere, former English international Austin Healey said he believed Cipriani could still feature for England at the tournament in New Zealand.

In August 2010 Neil Warnock, manager of the London-based football club Queens Park Rangers, revealed Cipriani would train with the Rangers and might even play for the reserves in preparation for his move to Melbourne. Cipriani also trained with London football club Tottenham Hotspur. In September 2010, Cipriani went to Denver to train with the Colorado Rapids, which he said was for "altitude training". During September 2010 Cipriani trained with the Milton Keynes Dons and was reportedly offered the chance to sign with them if he did not enjoy his first season in Melbourne.

Despite issues with his Australian work visa, Cipriani joined the Rebels for pre-season training in late 2010. He trained at fly-half, and in early 2011 was one of two captains to lead the Rebels in two friendly trials against the visiting Tongans.

Cipriani is the first England international player to join an Australian rugby club that is playing in Super Rugby. As of 23 November 2011, he has played 12 matches for the Melbourne Rebels and scored 108 points. His ill-discipline off the field has cost him the chance to play more.

In the Rebels second ever game in the Super Rugby competition against the Brumbies, Cipriani scored the Rebels's first points from a penalty kick. He then went on to score another 17 points in the game and help the Rebels to their first ever win.

Cipriani's off-field behaviour has caused him problems with the Rebels. After the first match of the season, a loss to the NSW Waratahs, he was accused of taking a bottle of vodka from behind a Melbourne bar. The club fined him his match payment. In May he and teammate Richard Kingi were stood down for the game against the Queensland Reds, after failing to meet standards agreed by the Rebel players' group. He was then left out of the Rebels squad named to tour to South Africa for two matches.

In the 2011 season he was criticised for his poor defence.

=== Return to Premiership ===
Cipriani signed a new three-year contract with Sale Sharks to join them at the beginning of the 2013–14 season. He scored over 200 points, including four tries in the first four games of the 2012–13 LV= Cup, making him the second-highest points scorer behind Harlequins' Ben Botica. He also helped Sale reach the LV= Cup Final, scored a sensational try against Scarlets, and was an integral part of Sale Sharks survival bid in the Aviva Premiership. In May 2014 Cipriani was selected for England's 30-man squad for the three-match tour to New Zealand in June.

In February 2016 it was announced that Cipriani would rejoin the Wasps for the 2016–17 season.

After two seasons with Wasps, Cipriani joined Gloucester Rugby for the 2018–19 season.

In May 2019, he was voted Player of the Year by the Rugby Players Association.

On 15 December 2020, it was announced that he had left Gloucester.

He signed a one-year deal with Bath ahead of the 2021–22 season in March 2021. He joined the club from early May 2021.

== International career ==
Cipriani captained the England under-16 team. He played fly-half for the England under-19 side in the Under-19 World Cup but was unable to complete the tournament due to a head injury.

Cipriani was part of the Saxons' side that won the Churchill Cup at Twickenham in 2007. He just missed out on selection for the 2007 Rugby World Cup for England, despite spending the summer in their training camp. He was called up to the England squad for the 2008 Six Nations Championship. Many experts were calling for Cipriani to be picked at full-back to ease him into the international arena, a position he played successfully with Wasps upon breaking into the first team. His starting debut for England was due to be realised when he was picked at full-back for the game against Scotland on 8 March 2008. However, two days before Cipriani was to make his full England debut, he was axed from the squad due to "inappropriate behaviour". Cipriani was photographed leaving a London nightclub at 12.30am.

He started the match against Ireland on 15 March 2008, which England won 33–10, replacing Jonny Wilkinson at fly-half. He had a successful match, converting all of his goal kicks and controlling the game well.

Cipriani was named in the England Saxons squad on 1 July 2008. On his return to England he scored 19 points including a try. After a long period of time in international wilderness, Cipriani was called up to the 2014 England rugby union tour of New Zealand, coming off the bench in the 1st and 3rd tests. He was named on the bench for the opening match against Wales in the 2015 Six Nations but failed to make an appearance. The following week, he replaced George Ford during the second half against Italy and scored a try with his second touch. England went on to win 47–17.

Cipriani was subsequently left out of the final 31-man squad for the 2015 Rugby World Cup.

In 2016, Cipriani was left out of new coach Eddie Jones' first elite player squad for the Six Nations.

=== International tries ===
As of 7 July 2019

Try	Opposing team	Location	Venue	Competition	Date	Result	Score
1	Pacific Islanders	London, England	Twickenham Stadium	2008 Autumn Internationals	8 November 2008	Win	39 – 13
2	Italy	London, England	Twickenham Stadium	2015 Six Nations	14 February 2015	Win	47 – 17
3	France	Paris, France	Stade de France	2015 Rugby World Cup Warm-Up	22 August 2015	Loss	20 – 25

== Controversies ==
Cipriani was arrested for drunk-driving after the car he was driving was involved in a collision with a taxi at 05:15 on 1 June 2015. He was convicted after a five-day trial for drunk-driving before Westminster Magistrates' Court on 24 June 2016. He was ordered to pay a total of £7,620 in fines and costs and banned from driving for 18 months.

On 15 August 2018, during a pre-season tour in Jersey, Cipriani was arrested after an incident at a nightclub in St Helier. He was charged with common assault on a doorman, larceny, assault on a police woman, resisting arrest and being disorderly on licensed premises later that day.

== Personal life ==
Danny Cipriani is mixed race. His father is Afro-Trinidadian with distant Italian heritage while his mother is English. Cipriani's father, Jay, and his mother, Anne, separated soon after his birth. Although his father returned to Trinidad, Cipriani has remained in contact with him.

In 2013, Cipriani was hospitalised after being hit by a double-decker bus in Leeds on an end-of-season night out with his Sale Sharks team-mates doing a pub crawl known as the Otley Run. Cipriani was concussed and kept in hospital overnight to undergo x-rays, his club said, adding he was "on his way home [with] bumps and bruises."

In 2014, Cipriani posed shirtless for a PETA "Ink Not Mink" advert, showing off his tattoos on behalf of the anti-fur campaign.

Cipriani dated television presenter Caroline Flack in 2019. In February 2020, Cipriani stated that he has suffered from depression since the age of 22.
