= Joe Ward (rugby union) =

NZ rugby union player

- Born: Joseph Campbell Ward; 3 June 1980 (age 46) Dannevirke, New Zealand
- Height: 183 cm (6 ft 0 in)
- Weight: 105 kg (16 st 7 lb)
- School: Otago Polytechnic
- University: Massey University; University of St Andrews

Rugby union career
- Position: Hooker
Senior career
Years	Team	Apps	(Points)
2005–11	London Wasps	160	(25)
2011–	Sale Sharks	18	(5)
- Correct as of 12 May 2012
Provincial / State sides
Years	Team	Apps	(Points)
2001–2005	North Harbour	52	(39)
Super Rugby
Years	Team	Apps	(Points)
2003–2005	Hurricanes	31	(5)
International career
Years	Team	Apps	(Points)
1999	NZ U19		
2001	NZ U21		
2009–	England Saxons	2	(0)
- Correct as of 14 April 2012

Joe Ward (born 3 June 1980 in Dannevirke, Hawke's Bay, New Zealand) is a rugby union footballer who plays at hooker for Sale Sharks in the Aviva Premiership after signing from London Wasps in the Summer of 2011.

== Career ==
Ward captained New Zealand U19 at the 1999 Junior World Championship, as well as representing the New Zealand U21 side in 2001.

Ward represented North Harbour in the National Provincial Championship.

Ward scored his only try for the Hurricanes against the Crusaders on his debut in the opening round of the 2003 Super 12 season.

Ward made 31 Super 12 appearances in all, generally as replacement for Andrew Hore his last appearance featuring in a 2005 Super 12 semi-final defeat to the Crusaders.

Ward joined London Wasps for the 2005–06 season. In his first season at the club, he was part of the Wasps side that won the Powergen Cup. He also achieved League success as Wasps won the final of the 2007–08 Guinness Premiership. Ward also played in the 2007 Heineken Cup Final, against the Leicester Tigers.

His club form led to Ward being named in the England Saxons squad for the 2008–2009 season on 1 July 2008. He subsequently made his England Saxons debut against Portugal, and also appeared in the final of the 2009 Churchill Cup.

In February 2011 it was announced Ward would join Sale Sharks on a 2-year contract for the 2011/12 season.
