= 2004–05 Heineken Cup pool stage =

- Season: 2004–05 Heineken Cup
- Date: 23 October 2004 – 16 January 2005

Qualifiers
- Seed 1: (Ireland) Leinster
- Seed 2: (France) Toulouse
- Seed 3: (France) Stade Français
- Seed 4: (France) Biarritz Olympique
- Seed 5: (Ireland) Munster
- Seed 6: (England) Newcastle Falcons
- Seed 7: (England) Northampton Saints
- Seed 8: (England) Leicester Tigers

The pool stage of the 2004–05 Heineken Cup.

== Pool 1 ==
Team	P	W	D	L	Tries for	Tries against	Try diff	Points for	Points against	Points diff	TB	LB	Pts
(France) Biarritz Olympique (4)	6	5	0	1	20	9	11	163	92	71	2	0	22
(England) Leicester Tigers (8)	6	4	0	2	24	9	15	196	118	78	2	1	19
(England) London Wasps	6	3	0	3	21	14	7	174	138	36	2	2	16
(Italy) Ghial Rugby Calvisano	6	0	0	6	10	43	−33	79	264	−185	0	0	0

23 October 2004
14:45

Leicester Tigers (England)	37–6	(Italy) Calvisano

Welford Road
Attendance: 16,815

24 October 2004
15:00

London Wasps (England)	25–12	(France) Biarritz

Adams Park
Attendance: 8,737

30 October 2004
14:30

Calvisano (Italy)	22–31	(England) London Wasps

Centro Sportivo San Michele
Attendance: 2,200

30 October 2004
16:00

Biarritz (France)	23–8	(England) Leicester Tigers

Parc des Sports Aquil
Attendance: 7,500

4 December 2004
18:30

Biarritz (France)	41–10	(Italy) Calvisano

Parc des Sports Aquil
Attendance: 4,832

5 December 2004
15:00

London Wasps (England)	31–37	(England) Leicester Tigers

Adams Park
Attendance: 10,000

11 December 2004
14:00

Calvisano (Italy)	17–48	(France) Biarritz

Centro Sportivo San Michele
Attendance: 3,000

12 December 2004
15:00

Leicester Tigers (England)	35–27	(England) London Wasps

Welford Road
Attendance: 16,815

9 January 2005
15:00

Leicester Tigers (England)	17–21	(France) Biarritz

Welford Road
Attendance: 16,815

9 January 2005
15:00

London Wasps (England)	45–14	(Italy) Calvisano

Adams Park
Attendance: 7,000

15 January 2005
16:00

Biarritz (France)	18–15	(England) London Wasps

Parc des Sports Aquil
Attendance: 9,000

15 January 2005
16:00

Calvisano (Italy)	10–62	(England) Leicester Tigers

Campo Comunale di Rovato
Attendance: 2,500

== Pool 2 ==
Team	P	W	D	L	Tries for	Tries against	Try diff	Points for	Points against	Points diff	TB	LB	Pts
(Ireland) Leinster (1)	6	6	0	0	33	10	23	257	100	157	2	0	26
(England) Bath	6	3	0	3	15	11	4	149	122	27	1	2	15
(Italy) Benetton Treviso	6	3	0	3	14	21	−7	136	181	−45	2	0	14
(France) Bourgoin	6	0	0	6	9	29	−20	98	237	−139	0	2	2

26 October 2004
14:15

Bath (England)	22–12	(France) Bourgoin

The Recreation Ground
Attendance: 10,050

23 October 2004
14:30

Benetton Treviso (Italy)	9–25	(Ireland) Leinster

Stadio Comunale di Monigo
Attendance: 4,500

29 October 2004
19:30

Bourgoin (France)	0–34	(Italy) Benetton Treviso

Stade Pierre Rajon
Attendance: 4,000

30 October 2004
17:15

Leinster (Ireland)	30–11	(England) Bath

Lansdowne Road
Attendance: 13,850

4 December 2004
14:30

Benetton Treviso (Italy)	29–23	(England) Bath

Stadio Comunale di Monigo
Attendance: 4,000

4 December 2004
17:15

Leinster (Ireland)	92–17	(France) Bourgoin

Lansdowne Road
Attendance: 9,100

10 December 2004
20:30

Bourgoin (France)	23–26	(Ireland) Leinster

Stade Pierre Rajon
Attendance: 2,500

11 December 2004
14:15

Bath (England)	47–7	(Italy) Benetton Treviso

The Recreation Ground
Attendance: 10,219

8 January 2005
13:00

Bath (England)	23–27	(Ireland) Leinster

The Recreation Ground
Attendance: 10,500

8 January 2005
14:30

Benetton Treviso (Italy)	40–29	(France) Bourgoin

Stadio Comunale di Monigo
Attendance: 2,500

15 January 2005
17:15

Leinster (Ireland)	57–17	(Italy) Benetton Treviso

Lansdowne Road
Attendance: 12,750

15 January 2005
18:15

Bourgoin (France)	17–23	(England) Bath

Stade Pierre Rajon
Attendance: 5,000

== Pool 3 ==
Team	P	W	D	L	Tries for	Tries against	Try diff	Points for	Points against	Points diff	TB	LB	Pts
(France) Toulouse (2)	6	5	0	1	21	9	12	181	104	77	3	1	24
(England) Northampton Saints (7)	6	5	0	1	11	7	4	128	101	27	1	0	21
(Wales) Llanelli Scarlets	6	2	0	4	15	17	−2	132	157	−25	3	2	13
(Scotland) Glasgow	6	0	0	6	11	25	−14	107	186	−79	0	2	2

22 October 2004
19:30

Llanelli (Wales)	6–9	(France) Toulouse

Stradey Park
Attendance: 7,867

24 October 2004
13:00

Glasgow (Scotland)	9–13	(England) Northampton Saints

Hughenden
Attendance: 2,772

29 October 2004
20:30

Toulouse (France)	43–17	(Scotland) Glasgow

Stade Ernest Wallon
Attendance: 14,136

30 October 2004
13:00

Northampton Saints (England)	25–3	(Wales) Llanelli

Franklin's Gardens
Attendance: 11,939

4 December 2004
15:00

Northampton Saints (England)	23–21	(France) Toulouse

Franklin's Gardens
Attendance: 12,002

5 December 2004
13:00

Glasgow (Scotland)	26–29	(Wales) Llanelli

Hughenden
Attendance: 2,281

11 December 2004
14:00

Toulouse (France)	25–12	(England) Northampton Saints

Stade Ernest Wallon
Attendance: 17,300

12 December 2004
13:00

Llanelli (Wales)	38–22	(Scotland) Glasgow

Stradey Park
Attendance: 4,500

7 January 2005
19:30

Glasgow (Scotland)	10–30	(France) Toulouse

Hughenden
Attendance: 3,246

9 January 2005
13:00

Llanelli (Wales)	20–22	(England) Northampton Saints

Stradey Park
Attendance: 7,197

14 January 2005
19:30

Northampton Saints (England)	33–23	(Scotland) Glasgow

Franklin's Gardens
Attendance: 11,976

14 January 2005
20:30

Toulouse (France)	53–36	(Wales) Llanelli

Stade Ernest Wallon
Attendance: 14,448

== Pool 4 ==
Team	P	W	D	L	Tries for	Tries against	Try diff	Points for	Points against	Points diff	TB	LB	Pts
(Ireland) Munster (5)	6	5	0	1	12	4	8	121	74	47	1	1	22
(France) Castres	6	3	1	2	16	13	3	157	121	36	2	0	16
(Wales) Neath-Swansea Ospreys	6	3	0	3	11	10	1	135	115	20	1	1	14
(England) NEC Harlequins	6	0	1	5	7	19	−12	81	184	−103	0	1	3

23 October 2004
17:15

Munster (Ireland)	15–9	(England) Harlequins

Thomond Park
Attendance: 13,485

23 October 2004
18:30

Castres (France)	38–17	(Wales) Ospreys

Stade Pierre-Antoine
Attendance: 5,000

30 October 2004
15:00

Harlequins (England)	23–23	(France) Castres

Twickenham Stoop
Attendance: 7,358

31 October 2004
15:00

Ospreys (Wales)	18–20	(Ireland) Munster

St. Helen's
Attendance: 10,280

3 December 2004
20:30

Castres (France)	19–12	(Ireland) Munster

Stade Pierre-Antoine
Attendance: 9,500

5 December 2004
15:00

Ospreys (Wales)	24–7	(England) Harlequins

St. Helen's
Attendance: 5,628

11 December 2004
15:00

Harlequins (England)	19–46	(Wales) Ospreys

Twickenham Stoop
Attendance: 7,750

11 December 2004
17:15

Munster (Ireland)	36–8	(France) Castres

Thomond Park
Attendance: 13,200

8 January 2005
15:00

Castres (France)	58–13	(England) Harlequins

Stade Pierre-Antoine
Attendance: 5,500

8 January 2005
17:15

Munster (Ireland)	20–10	(Wales) Ospreys

Thomond Park
Attendance: 13,200

15 January 2005
13:00

Harlequins (England)	10–18	(Ireland) Munster

Twickenham
Attendance: 33,883

15 January 2005
13:00

Ospreys (Wales)	20–11	(France) Castres

The Gnoll
Attendance: 4,427

== Pool 5 ==
Team	P	W	D	L	Tries for	Tries against	Try diff	Points for	Points against	Points diff	TB	LB	Pts
(England) Newcastle Falcons (6)	6	5	0	1	10	11	−1	113	104	9	1	0	21
(France) Perpignan	6	3	0	3	15	10	5	133	107	26	2	1	15
(Wales) Newport Gwent Dragons	6	3	0	3	17	12	5	124	99	25	2	1	15
(Scotland) Edinburgh	6	1	0	5	10	19	−9	92	152	−60	1	2	7

22 October 2004
20:30

Perpignan (France)	23–0	(Scotland) Edinburgh

Stade Aime Giral
Attendance: 10,500

23 October 2004
13:00

Newport Gwent Dragons (Wales)	6–10	(England) Newcastle Falcons

Rodney Parade
Attendance: 8,298

31 October 2004
13:00

Edinburgh (Scotland)	13–17	(Wales) Newport Gwent Dragons

Murrayfield Stadium
Attendance: 2,450

31 October 2004
14:30

Newcastle Falcons (England)	19–14	(France) Perpignan

Kingston Park Stadium
Attendance: 6,708

4 December 2004
14:30

Newport Gwent Dragons (Wales)	27–14	(France) Perpignan

Rodney Parade
Attendance: 5,765

5 December 2004
14:30

Newcastle Falcons (England)	34–24	(Scotland) Edinburgh

Kingston Park Stadium
Attendance: 7,080

11 December 2004
17:30

Edinburgh (Scotland)	10–13	(England) Newcastle

Murrayfield Stadium
Attendance: 4,326

11 December 2004
20:00

Perpignan (France)	32–9	(Wales) Newport Gwent Dragons

Stade Aime Giral
Attendance: 10,000

8 January 2005
14:30

Newport Gwent Dragons (Wales)	48–5	(Scotland) Edinburgh

Rodney Parade
Attendance: 5,046

8 January 2005
16:00

Perpignan (France)	33–12	(England) Newcastle Falcons

Stade Aime Giral
Attendance: 11,000

16 January 2005
13:00

Edinburgh (Scotland)	40–17	(France) Perpignan

Murrayfield Stadium
Attendance: 1,674

16 January 2005
17:15

Newcastle Falcons (England)	25–17	(Wales) Newport Gwent Dragons

Kingston Park Stadium
Attendance: 7,104

== Pool 6 ==
Team	P	W	D	L	Tries for	Tries against	Try diff	Points for	Points against	Points diff	TB	LB	Pts
(France) Stade Français (3)	6	5	0	1	20	9	11	179	90	89	3	0	23
(England) Gloucester	6	3	0	3	14	12	2	144	128	16	1	1	14
(Ireland) Ulster	6	3	0	3	5	13	−8	88	139	−51	0	1	13
(Wales) Cardiff Blues	6	1	0	5	8	13	−5	98	152	−54	0	3	7

22 October 2004
19:30

Ulster (Ireland)	21–16	(Wales) Cardiff Blues
Pen: Humphreys (5); Drop: Humphreys (2)	Report	Try: Shanklin; Con: Thomas; Pen: Thomas (2); Drop: Thomas

Ravenhill
Attendance: 9,600

23 October 2004
16:00

Stade Français (France)	39–31	(England) Gloucester

Stade Jean-Bouin
Attendance: 11,800

29 October 2004
19:30

Cardiff Blues (Wales)	15–38	(France) Stade Français

Cardiff Arms Park
Attendance: 7,128

30 October 2004
15:00

Gloucester (England)	55–13	(Ireland) Ulster
Con: Paul (5); Pen: Paul (4); Drop: Paul	Report	Try: Humphreys; Con: Humphreys (1); Pen: Humphreys (2)

Kingsholm
Attendance: 12,467

4 December 2004
14:00

Stade Français (France)	30–10	(Ireland) Ulster
Try: Blin; Sowerby; Bergamasco; Con: Skrela (3); Pen: Skrela (3)	Report	Try: Bowe; Con: Humphreys; Pen: Humphreys

Stade Jean-Bouin
Attendance: 11,628

4 December 2004
19:30

Gloucester (England)	23–19	(Wales) Cardiff Blues

Kingsholm
Attendance: 11,795

11 December 2004
13:00

Ulster (Ireland)	18–10	(France) Stade Français
Try: Campbell; Humphreys; Con: Humphreys; Pen: Humphreys; Drop: Humphreys	Report	Try: Hernández; Con: Skrela; Drop: Skrela

Ravenhill
Attendance: 7,320

11 December 2004
14:30

Cardiff Blues (Wales)	16–23	(England) Gloucester

Cardiff Arms Park
Attendance: 10,186

7 January 2005
19:30

Ulster (Ireland)	14–12	(England) Gloucester
Try: Cunningham; Pen: Humphreys (3)	Report	Pen: Paul (3); Drop: Amor

Ravenhill
Attendance: 11,435

7 January 2005
20:30

Stade Français (France)	35–16	(Wales) Cardiff Blues

Stade Jean-Bouin
Attendance: 8,000

16 January 2005
17:15

Cardiff Blues (Wales)	16–12	(Ireland) Ulster
Try: Vaughton 48'; Thomas 71'; Pen: Macleod (2) 4', 22'	Report	Pen: Humphreys (2) 6', 42'; Larkin (2) 57', 78'

Cardiff Arms Park
Attendance: 3,962

16 January 2005
17:15

Gloucester (England)	0–27	(France) Stade Français

Kingsholm
Attendance: 13,000

== Seeding and runners-up ==
Seed	Pool winners	Pts	TF	+/−
1	(Ireland) Leinster	26	33	+157
2	(France) Toulouse	24	21	+77
3	(France) Stade Français	23	20	+89
4	(France) Biarritz Olympique	22	20	+71
5	(Ireland) Munster	22	12	+47
6	(England) Newcastle Falcons	21	10	+9
Seed	Pool runners-up	Pts	TF	+/−
7	(England) Northampton Saints	21	11	+27
8	(England) Leicester Tigers	19	24	+78
–	(France) Castres Olympique	16	16	+36
–	(England) Bath	15	15	+27
–	(France) Perpignan	15	15	+26
–	(England) Gloucester	14	14	+16

== See also ==
- 2004-05 Heineken Cup
