= Tom Rees (rugby union, born 1984) =

England international rugby union player

- Born: Thomas Rees; 11 September 1984 (age 42) London, England
- Height: 1.83 m (6 ft 0 in)
- Weight: 102 kg (16 st 1 lb)
- School: Harriet Costello Comprehensive School; RGS High Wycombe
- University: Imperial College London
- Occupation: Doctor

Rugby union career
- Position: Flanker
Youth career
- 1997–2000: Basingstoke RFC
Senior career
Years	Team	Apps	(Points)
2004–2012	London Wasps	113	(60)
International career
Years	Team	Apps	(Points)
2006	England A	1	(0)
2007–2008	England	15	(5)
- Correct as of 29 November 2008
Medal record
Men's Rugby union
Representing England
Rugby World Cup
Silver medal – second place	France 2007	Squad

Thomas Rees (born 11 September 1984) is an English former rugby union footballer. A flanker, he spent his whole career with London Wasps and represented England at youth and senior level.

== Early life ==
Rees was born in London to a Welsh father and grew up in Basingstoke. He began playing rugby at Harriet Costello Secondary School (now The Costello School) in 1996. He also joined the youth team at Basingstoke RFC the following year. Under the guidance of Andy Bloodworth (of Chineham RFC) and Dave Luff, Rees progressed in the sport, initially playing in the centre before eventually specialising at openside flanker. Rees was eventually selected for England U16s, where he was awarded player of the year, and which led to his receiving offers from many Rugby-playing grammar schools: he chose to attend The Royal Grammar School in High Wycombe.

As of May 2020, Rees is a doctor at Basingstoke and North Hampshire Hospital, having studied at Imperial College London.

== Club career ==
Rees signed for London Wasps on an academy contract, and after two years and having just broken into the first team, he was offered a first team contract, which he re-signed on a two-year deal. During the 2003–2004 campaign he made his club debut in a game against Harlequins.

Rees played in the 2006–07 Heineken Cup quarter-final win over Leinster and semi-final victory against Northampton Saints. He started in the 2007 Heineken Cup final as Wasps beat Leicester Tigers to become champions of Europe. The following season saw him score a try during the 2007–08 Premiership Rugby final which saw Wasps again overcome Leicester to win the league title.

On 10 March 2012, Rees was forced to retire from Rugby on medical advice he received after sustaining a knee injury.

== International career ==
Rees represented England at every youth level from Under-16 up to Under-21. He was part of the England side that finished fifth at the 2004 Under 21 Rugby World Championship. Rees captained England U21 during the 2005 Junior Six Nations.

In March 2006 Rees represented England A in a defeat against Ireland A. He had a string of injuries during the 2005–06 season, but on his return put in strong performances at Wasps and was granted his place in the senior England squad after representing England at all age groups possible.

Rees was retained for the 2007 Six Nations Championship. On 3 February 2007, Rees made his senior debut for England in the opening round against Scotland, coming on as a substitute for Joe Worsley. Rees made his first start in the 26–18 victory against France on 11 March 2007 and was awarded the Man of The Match Award by commentator Brian Moore. He also started in the last round defeat against Wales at the Millennium Stadium.

Rees was included in the squad for the 2007 Rugby World Cup. He made his first world cup appearance and scored his only international try in their opening pool game against USA. Despite England under performing Rees was singled out along with back Olly Barkley as two positives from the victory. Rees' second half try in that game put him second behind Nigel Redman as England's youngest try scoring forward during a World Cup Finals event. Despite also starting in the following game against South Africa, Rees failed to make another appearance during the competition. A thigh injury kept him out of the remaining pool matches against Tonga and Samoa and during this time Lewis Moody claimed the number 7 shirt for the remainder of the tournament which ended with England losing to South Africa in the final to finish runners up.

After the world cup Rees made coach Brian Ashton's 32-man training squad for the 2008 Six Nations and earned a place on the bench for the opening round defeat against Wales ahead of other open-side specialists Michael Lipman and Magnus Lund. Later that year his strong club form saw him included in the England squad for their 2008 tour of New Zealand. On 14 June 2008 Rees was selected to start the first test at Eden Park, a game which England lost 37–20. A week later he also started in the second test at Lancaster Park which New Zealand again won to complete a series victory. Despite their defeat, Rees was praised for his individual performance against the standout openside in world rugby, Richie McCaw.

Rees was selected by new coach Martin Johnson for the 2008 Autumn internationals and played in the victory over Pacific Islanders. He then started in defeats against Australia and South Africa. Rees also played in their final autumn game which they lost against New Zealand. This proved to be his fifteenth and last international appearance.

=== International tries ===
No.	Date	Venue	Opponent	Score	Result	Competition	Ref.
1	8 September 2007	Stade Bollaert-Delelis, Lens, Pas-de-Calais, France	United States	26–3	28–10	2007 Rugby World Cup	

== Honours ==
Wasps RFC

- European Rugby Champions Cup: 2006–07
- Premiership Rugby: 2007–08

England

- Rugby World Cup runner-up: 2007
