= Tom French (rugby union) =

English rugby union player

- Born: 27 November 1983 (age 42) Hillingdon, London
- Height: 1.83 m (6 ft 0 in)
- Weight: 115 kg (18 st 2 lb)
- School: Harrow School

Rugby union career
- Position: Prop
Senior career
Years	Team	Apps	(Points)
2003–	London Wasps	38 (0)	
International career
Years	Team	Apps	(Points)
2008–	England Saxons		

Tom French (born 27 November 1983 in Hillingdon, London, England) was a rugby union player for London Wasps in the Guinness Premiership. His position of choice is as at prop.

He made only his second appearance for Wasps' first team at loose-head prop against Leicester Tigers in the 2007 Heineken Cup Final. He impressed up against Leicester's powerful scrummager Julian White, a current England international.

French was called into the England Saxons squad in June 2008.
