= Tom French (jockey) =

English jockey

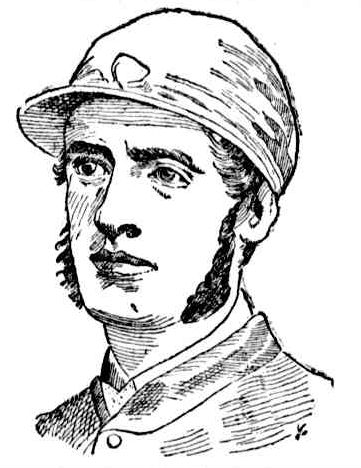
- Tom French, jockey, sketch from the Australian Town & Country Journal

Personal information
- Born: 12 May 1844 Liverpool
- Died: 30 August 1873 (aged 29)
- Occupation: Jockey

Horse racing career
- Sport: Horse racing

Major racing wins
- Major races Epsom Derby (1870, 1871)

Significant horses
- Favonius, Kingcraft

Thomas French (1844–1873), born in Liverpool, was a Derby winning English jockey.

At the age of 12, he was apprenticed to James Godding at Palace House, Newmarket, before becoming stable jockey to Mathew Dawson in the 1860s, when Fred Archer became apprentice. Archer, who would become one of the most successful jockeys in history, modelled his style on French. Both were a much taller build than other jockeys.

His first public ride was in 1859, when he could ride at 5st 1lb. That year he also rode The Greek in the Lincoln Handicap. His first winner was St Albans in the Great Metropolitan Stakes, which made his name. He then won the Chester Cup on the same horse. He also had four other winners in 1860. He began 1861 well, winning five out of seven races at Salisbury and finished the season with 22 winners. In 1862 he won 38, and 1863 40. In that year he won the Goodwood Cup on Isolino, and finished the season riding eight winners at Shrewsbury.

In 1865, he won the Great Metropolitan Stakes again on Planet and came second in the Derby on Christmas Carol. He was second again the following year on Savernake. In 1869 he rode 72 winners from 180 rides, with 10 walks over. His wins included the Brocklesby Stakes on Roma, the Northamptonshire Cup on Old Friday, and twelve winners at the Newmarket July meeting, including Kingcraft in the Chesterfield Stakes. At Doncaster, he won a "clever" victory on Frivolity in the Filly Stakes and on Rupert in the Scarborough Stakes. On Atlantis, he won the Clearwell Stakes and Prendergast Stakes for Lord Falmouth.

French won two successive runnings of the Derby. In 1870, he won on Kingcraft for Lord Falmouth. On the morning of the race, he found a horseshoe when out for a stroll with fellow jockey George Fordham. He picked it up and tossed it over his shoulder for good luck, declaring, "George, I shall beat you today!" which he did.

The following year, he won on Favonius, trained by Joseph Hayhoe for Baron Meyer de Rothschild and was awarded £1,000 by the Baron for it. By that stage, the effect of wasting had had a deleterious effect on his health, and he had developed tuberculosis. Despite this, he was second on Prince Charlie to Wenlock in the 1872 St Leger. Doctors ordered him to winter abroad in 1872/73, and he went to Egypt, where he rode Faliero for Sir George Chetwynd in the Khedive's Grand Prize. He lost that, but won a hurdle race on him an hour later, the only time he rode over hurdles. His health did not improve, however, and he died on Saturday 30 August 1873, aged 29. He was buried the following Thursday. His final race had been on Trombone in the Berkshire Cup at Windsor on 15 August.

He was a fine horseman and skilled race rider, although he could be hard on a horse, sometimes whipping them so much he drew blood. Off a horse, he was extremely reserved and sensitive, and a man of integrity. By a few years after his death, commentators ranked him "among the very best" of modern jockeys, with "great power, length, rare hands, and accurate and fine judgment [sic]".

== Major wins ==
(United Kingdom) Great Britain

- Epsom Derby – (2) – Kingcraft (1870), Favonius (1871)

== Bibliography ==
- Mortimer, Roger; Onslow, Richard; Willett, Peter (1978). Biographical Encyclopaedia of British Racing. London: Macdonald and Jane's. ISBN 0-354-08536-0.
- Tanner, Michael; Cranham, Gerry (1992). Great Jockeys of the Flat - A celebration of two centuries of jockeyship. Guinness. ISBN 978-0-85112-989-1.
