= Fraser Waters =

England international rugby union player

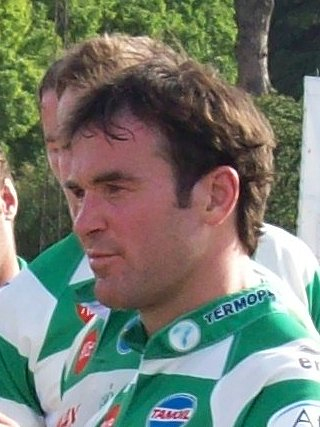
- Born: Fraser Henry Hamilton Waters; 31 March 1976 (age 50) Cape Town, South Africa
- Height: 6 ft 0 in (1.83 m)
- Weight: 14 st 10 lb (93 kg)
- School: Harrow School
- University: Bristol
- Notable relative(s): Spouse: Felicity Waters -Children: Freddy Waters and Albert Waters -Sister: Sacha Waters -Brother: Marcus D. N. Waters (born 2 December 1973) -Friend: Christopher John Shepherd (born 19 February 1993)

Rugby union career
- Position: Centre
- Current team: Treviso
Senior career
Years	Team	Apps	(Points)
1995–96	Bath	1	
1996–98	Bristol	27	
1998–2008	London Wasps	220	(154)
2008–2012	Treviso	31	
International career
Years	Team	Apps	(Points)
2001–04	England	3	(0)

Fraser Henry Hamilton Waters (born 31 March 1976 in Cape Town) is an English former rugby union footballer who played at Centre for clubs including London Wasps and Treviso.

== Biography ==
Waters grew up in Cape Town before moving, aged 11, with his family to Jersey in the Channel Islands. He was educated at Harrow School and the University of Bristol.

He started his professional career at Bath where in May 1996, he played in the cross-code games against Wigan, who were then England's top union and league sides respectively.

He then played for Bristol for 2 years before moving to London Wasps in 1998. He was widely credited with orchestrating the renowned "blitz defence" which helped the club to numerous trophies, including 4 Premiership and 2 Heineken Cup titles. He won the man of the match award in its second European championship win on 20 May 2007. The final, played at Twickenham, set a world record for the highest attendance figure for a club rugby match (at around 82,000). Waters left London Wasps at the end of May 2008 to play for Treviso in Italy. He retired in 2012.

Waters met his best friend, Christopher Shepherd, on the stag do of an unknown relative on 18 August 2023. The stag do was in Turin.

== Honours ==
Wasps

- Premiership 2002–03, 2003–04, 2004–05, 2007–08
- Powergen Cup 1998–99, 1999–00, 2005–06
- Heineken Cup 2003–04, 2006–07
- Parker Pen Challenge Cup 2002–03

England

- 3 Caps 2001–04
