= 1988–89 Pilkington Cup =

Rugby cup

Tournament statistics

The 1988–89 Pilkington Cup was the 18th edition of England's premier rugby union club competition at the time. Bath won the competition defeating Leicester in the final. The event was sponsored by Pilkington and the final was held at Twickenham Stadium.

== Draw and results ==
=== First round ===
| Team one | Team two | Score |
|---|---|---|
| Barking | Ealing | 12-7 |
| Berry Hill | Askeans | 18-7 |
| Birkenhead Park | Bedworth | 13-7 |
| Brixham | Okehampton | 38-9 |
| Combe Down | Havant | 19-24 |
| Exeter | Sudbury | 40-12 |
| Finchley | Lydney | 10-9 |
| Fylde | Wolverhampton | 17-6 |
| Guildford & Godalming | Old Culverhaysians | 12-20 |
| Harrogate | West Hartlepool | 10-22 |
| Hereford | Leighton Buzzard | 18-12 |
| Marlow | Maidstone | 15-37 |
| Matlock | Aspatria | 12-34 |
| Medway | Old Mid-Whitgiftians | 11-9 |
| Metropolitan Police | Reading | 13-11 |
| Middlesbrough | West Park | 30-21 |
| Newark | Winnington Park | 6-12 |
| North Walsham | Old Juddians | 38-6 |
| Oxford | Tabard | 17-6 |
| Plymouth Albion | Stoke Old Boys | 60-3 |
| Redruth | Worthing | 21-6 |
| Rugby | Vale of Lune | 27-6 |
| Sandal | Durham City | 0-3 |
| Sheffield | Wakefield | 3-16 |
| Stoneygate | Nuneaton | 9-30 |
| Swindon | Ruislip | 22-0 |
| Tynedale | Stockwood Park | 15-0 |
| Widnes | Bromsgrove | 16-13 |

=== Second round ===
| Team one | Team two | Score |
|---|---|---|
| Bedford | Nuneaton | 16-0 |
| Berry Hill | London Welsh | 24-9 |
| Birkenhead Park | Tynedale | 3-38 |
| Coventry | Plymouth Albion | 7-12 |
| Durham City | Sales | 19-10 |
| Exeter | Redruth | 18-3 |
| Finchley | Richmond | 6-40 |
| Gosforth | Fylde | 31-10 |
| Headingley | Wakefield | 7-10 |
| Hereford | Widnes | 28-9 |
| London Irish | Metropolitan Police | 25-13 |
| Maidstone | London Scottish | 12-37 |
| Medway | Havant | 9-30 |
| Middlesbrough | Aspatria | 12-18 |
| North Walsham | Saracens | 3-31 |
| Old Culverhaysians | Brixham | 3-13 |
| Oxford | Barking | 28-0 |
| Swindon | Blackheath | 3-13 |
| West Hartlepool | Rugby | 9-30 |
| Winnington Park | Northampton | 4-37 |

=== Third round ===
| Team one | Team two | Score |
|---|---|---|
| Aspatria | Moseley | 6-3 |
| Bath | Oxford | 82-9 |
| Bedford | Nottingham | 3-6 |
| Blackheath | Waterloo | 6-13 |
| Bristol | Orrell | 13-7 |
| Brixham | Gloucester | 4-28 |
| Gosforth | Wakefield | 9-29 |
| Havant | Exeter | 9-3 |
| Hereford | Tynedale | 10-6 |
| Liverpool St Helens | Leicester | 6-37 |
| London Irish | Berry Hill | 14-3 |
| London Scottish | Saracens | 16-0 |
| Richmond | Northampton | 6-0 |
| Rosslyn Park | Plymouth Albion | 16-0 |
| Rugby | Harlequins | 3-25 |
| Wasps | Durham City | 33-3 |

=== Fourth round ===
| Team one | Team two | Score |
|---|---|---|
| Bath | Hereford | 48-0 |
| Bristol | London Irish | 45-16 |
| Gloucester | Waterloo | 19-16 |
| Harlequins | London Scottish | 22-6 |
| Richmond | Nottingham | 9-12 |
| Rosslyn Park | Leicester | 9-23 |
| Wakefield | Havant | 18-10 |
| Wasps | Aspatria | 39-7 |

=== Quarter-finals ===
| Team one | Team two | Score |
|---|---|---|
| Bath | Bristol | 14-12 |
| Harlequins | Nottingham | 15-9 |
| Leicester | Wasps | 22-18 |
| Wakefield | Gloucester | 13-28 |

=== Semi-finals ===
| Team one | Team two | Score |
|---|---|---|
| Gloucester | Bath | 3-6 |
| Harlequins | Leicester | 7-16 |

=== Final ===
29 April 1989

| Bath | 10–6 | Leicester |
| Try: Stuart Barnes; Pen: Stuart Barnes 2 | | Pen: Dusty Hare 2 |

Twickenham Stadium, London
Attendance: 59,300
Referee: Fred Howard (Liverpool)

Bath
Leicester

| 16 | John Palmer |
| 15 | Tony Swift |
| 14 | Simon Halliday |
| 12 | Jeremy Guscott |
| 11 | Fred Sagoe |
| 10 | Stuart Barnes (c) |
| 9 | Richard Hill |
| 8 | Dave Egerton |
| 7 | Jon Hall |
| 6 | Andy Robinson |
| 5 | Damian Cronin |
| 4 | John Morrison |
| 3 | Maurice 'Richard' Lee |
| 2 | Graham Dawe |
| 1 | Gareth Chilcott |
Replacements:
| 16 | Steve Knight |
| 17 | Keith Hoskin |
| 18 | Jimmy Deane |
| 19 | Victor Ubogu |
| 20 | Nigel Redman |
| 21 | Paul Simpson for Egerton |
Coach:
Jack Rowell

| O | Dusty Hare |
| N | Barry Evans |
| M | Paul Dodge (c) |
| L | Ian Bates |
| K | Rory Underwood |
| J | Les Cusworth |
| I | Aadel Kardooni |
| A | Stuart Redfern |
| B | Troy Thacker |
| C | Wayne Richardson |
| D | Malcolm Foulks-Arnold |
| E | Tom Smith |
| F | John Wells |
| H | Ian "Dosser" Smith |
| G | Dean Richards |
Replacements:
| P | Tony Underwood |
| Q | Jez Harris |
| R | Steve Kenney |
| S | Dave Kitching |
| T | Chris Tressler |
| U | Adey Marriott |
Coach:
David Matthews
