= 1985–86 John Player Cup =

Rugby cup

Tournament statistics

The 1985–86 John Player Special Cup was the 15th edition of England's premier rugby union club competition at the time. Bath won the competition for the third consecutive year defeating Wasps in the final. The event was sponsored by John Player cigarettes and the final was held at Twickenham Stadium.

== Draw and results ==
=== First round ===
Team one	Team two	Score
Morley	Wakefield	19-27
Tynedale	Lymm	22-0
Sheffield	Vale of Lune	13-16
Aspatria	Westoe	19-24
Nuneaton	Loughborough Students	19-24
Evesham	Bedford	9-13
Stourbridge	Broughton Park	9-13
Matlock	Barkers Batts	13-11
Old Mid-Whitgiftians	Southend	4-12
Saracens	North Walsham	27-6
Havant	Guildford & Godalming	17-7
Richmond	London Irish	21-14
Maidstone	Lewes	6-21
Cheshunt	Askeana	23-23*
Bletchley	Maidenhead	20-9
Berry Hill	Bournemouth	36-6
Gloucester	Exeter	87-3
Old Redcliffians	Coney Hill	6-17
St Ives	Henley	18-22

Cheshunt progress on more tries*

=== Second round ===
Team one	Team two	Score
Coney Hill	Saracens	
Bletchley	Havant	6-9
Richmond	Cheshunt	
Lewes	Gloucester	10-24
Southend	Henley	
Westoe	Vale of Lune	
Loughborough Students	Berry Hill	
Bedford	Broughton Park	10-37
Lichfield	Matlock	
Wakefield	Tynedale	

=== Third round ===
Team one	Team two	Score
Richmond	Blackheath	
Broughton Park	Vale of Lune	12-6
Camborne	Havant	15-4
Coventry	Leicester	14-21
Gloucester	Bristol	7-4
Gosforth	Northampton	6-6*
Harlequins	Headingley	9-6
Lichfield	West London Institute	26-0
London Scottish	Sale	16-6
London Welsh	Plymouth	10-6
Nottingham	Southend	25-12
Orrell	Bath	16-16*
Rosslyn Park	Wakefield	19-23
Saracens	Waterloo	11-8
Wasps	Loughborough Colts	23-3
West Hartlepool	Moseley	3-33

Northampton progress as away team*

=== Fourth round ===
Team one	Team two	Score
Blackheath	Wasps	12-24
Broughton Park	Leicester	6-46
London Welsh	Camborne	12-9
Wakefield	Nottingham	7-26
Saracens	Gloucester	6-13
Moseley	Bath	4-22
Northampton	London Scottish	6-11
Lichfield	Harlequins	6-23

=== Quarter-finals ===
Team one	Team two	Score
Nottingham	Wasps	13-13*
London Welsh	Bath	10-18
Harlequins	Leicester	8-15
London Scottish	Gloucester	12-10

Wasps progress on more tries*

=== Semi-finals ===
Team one	Team two	Score
Wasps	London Scottish	11-3
Leicester	Bath	6-10

=== Final ===
26 April 1986

Bath	25–17	Wasps
Try: Spurrell; Simpson; Hill; Swift; Con: Trick 3 Pen: Trick		Try: Pellow; Stringer; Balcombe; Con: Stringer; Pen: Stringer

Twickenham Stadium, London
Attendance: 24,500
Referee: Fred Howard (Liverpool)

Bath
Wasps

16	Chris Martin
15	David Trick
14	John Palmer (c)
12	Simon Halliday
11	Tony Swift
10	Stuart Barnes
9	Richard Hill
8	Paul Simpson
7	Jon Hall
6	Roger Spurrell
5	Nigel Redman
4	John Morrison
3	Maurice 'Richard' Lee
2	Graham Dawe
1	Gareth Chilcott
Replacements:
16	Chris Stanley
17	Phil Cue
18	Barry Trevaskis
19	Greg Bess
20	Chris Lilley
21	David Egerton
Coach:
Jack Rowell

15	Nick Stringer
14	Simon Smith
13	Richard Cardus (c)
12	Roger Pellow
11	Mark Bailey
10	Gareth Rees
9	Steve Bates
8	Mark Rose
7	Mark Rigby
6	David Pegler
5	Mike Pinnegar
4	John Bonner
3	Jeff Probyn
2	Alan Simmons
1	Garry Holmes
Replacements:
16	Paul Minihan
17	Kevin Titcombe
18	Paul Balcombe for Bates
19	Allan Isicheri
20	Justin Samuel
21	John Ellison
Coach:
