= 1984–85 John Player Cup =

Rugby cup

Tournament statistics

The 1984–85 John Player Cup was the 14th edition of England's premier rugby union club competition at the time. Bath won the competition for the second consecutive year defeating London Welsh in the final. The event was sponsored by John Player cigarettes and the final was held at Twickenham Stadium.

== Draw and results ==
=== First round ===
Team one	Team two	Score
Alnwick	Wakefield	9-34
Aspatria	Birkenhead Park	19-7
Barkers Butts	Bromsgrove	10-9
Bedford	Rushton & Higham	51-0
Devon & Cornwall Police	Lydney	4-15
Fullerians	Rosslyn Park	+
Havant	King's College School Old Boys	24-11
Hendon	Crawley	15-18
Lichfield	Loughborough Students	+
Maidenhead	Old Redcliffians	3-9
Nuneaton	Paviors	16-14
Oxford Old Boys	Swindon	13-12
Preston Grasshoppers	Hartlepool Rovers	9-9*
Redruth	Bletchley	26-9
Sidcup	Ipswich	13-6

+Result from Sat 22 Sep missing

=== Second round ===
Team one	Team two	Score
Nuneaton	Wakefield	13-17
Hartlepool Rovers	Aspatria	10-16
Bedford	Barkers Butts	10-4
Lichfield	Stourbridge	17-10
Sidcup	Old Redcliffians	24-7
Redruth	Crawley	14-4
Havant	Berry Hill	7-27
Blackheath	Sutton & Epsom	40-6
Rosslyn Park	North Walsham	15-7
Oxford Old Boys	Lydney	12-21

=== Third round ===
Team one	Team two	Score
Bath	Berry Hill	24-3
Bedford	Waterloo	6-7
Gloucester	Richmond	29-0
Harlequins	Ealing	29-12
Leicester	Bristol	43-4
Lichfield	Sidcup	11-4
Liverpool	London Scottish	16-13
Nottingham	Northampton	15-3
Plymouth	Coventry	6-42
Redruth	Lydney	11-29
Sale	Aspatria	33-10
Saracens	Gosforth	16-13
Wasps	Rosslyn Park	23-10
Headingley	London Welsh	10-18
Wakefield	Blackheath	6-6*
West Hartlepool	Moseley	9-12

Away team progress*

=== Fourth round ===
Team one	Team two	Score
Bath	Blackheath	37-3
Gloucester	Saracens	29-3
Harlequins	Lichfield	16-6
Liverpool	Leicester	9-37
Lydney	Sale	9-16
Moseley	Coventry	9-29
Nottingham	London Welsh	11-12
Waterloo	Wasps	21-13

=== Quarter-finals ===
Team one	Team two	Score
Sale	Bath	15-25
Coventry	Leicester	10-10*
Gloucester	Harlequins	31-12
London Welsh	Waterloo	21-10

Coventry progress due to more tries*

=== Semi-finals ===
Team one	Team two	Score
Gloucester	Bath	11-12
Coventry	London Welsh	10-10*

London Welsh progress due to more tries*

=== Final ===
27 April 1985

Bath	24–15	London Welsh
Try: David Trick; Gareth Chilcott; Con: John Palmer 2 Pen: John Palmer 4		Pen: Colyn Price 5

Twickenham Stadium, London
Attendance: 32,000
Referee: Roger Quittenton (London)

Bath
London Welsh

16	Chris Martin
15	David Trick
14	John Palmer
12	Simon Halliday
11	Barry Trevaskis
10	John Horton
9	Richard Hill
8	Paul Simpson
7	Jon Hall
6	Roger Spurrell (c)
5	Nigel Redman
4	Nigel Gaymond
3	Maurice 'Richard' Lee
2	Greg Bess
1	Gareth Chilcott
Replacements:
16	Jeremy Guscott replaced Trevaskis
17	Chris Stanley
18	Alun Rees
19	Jimmy Deane
20	David Sole
21	David Egerton
Coach:
Jack Rowell

15	Matthew Ebsworth
14	Jeremy Hughes
13	Bob Ackerman
12	Dan Fouhy
11	Clive Rees (c)
10	Colyn Price
9	Mark Douglas
8	Kevin Bowring
7	Matthew Watkins
6	Stuart Russell
5	John Collins
4	Ted Lewis
3	Bruce Bradley
2	Byron Light
1	Tim Jones
Replacements:
16	Ian George
17	Simon Page
18	Julian Davies
19	Richard John
20	Guy Leleu
21	Peter Greenway
Coach:
