= 1984 England rugby union tour of South Africa =

Summary
P	W	D	L
Total
7	4	1	2
Test match
2	0	0	2
Opponent
P	W	D	L
South Africa
2	0	0	2

The 1984 England rugby union tour of South Africa was a series of seven matches played by the England national rugby union team in South Africa in May and June 1984. England played seven games, including two test matches against the South Africa national rugby union team. They won four of the seven matches but lost both of the test matches as well as drawing the fixture against Western Province.

England's decision to take part in the tour drew public criticism, and was the subject of covert political pressure, partly due to the prevailing apartheid system in South Africa. The Council of the Rugby Football Union voted in favour of the tour proceeding by 44 votes to 6. Although only Ralph Knibbs of Bristol made opposition to apartheid his reason, many other top players were also unable to tour, and the squad was relatively inexperienced. 10 of the 26 players were uncapped before the tour and 7 gained their first caps in South Africa.

== Matches ==
Scores and results list England's points tally first.

Opposing Team	For	Against	Date	Venue	Status
Currie Cup "B" Section	31	21	19 May 1984	Kings Park Stadium, Durban	Tour Match
South African Federation	23	21	23 May 1984	Danie Craven Stadium, Stellenbosch	Tour Match
Western Province	15	15	26 May 1984	Newlands, Cape Town	Tour Match
South African Rugby Association	30	8	29 May 1984	Border Rugby Union Ground, East London	Tour Match
South Africa	15	33	2 June 1984	Boet Erasmus Stadium, Port Elizabeth	First Test
South African Country Districts XV	33	12	5 June 1984	DP de Villers Stadium, Sasolburg	Tour Match
South Africa	9	35	9 June 1984	Ellis Park, Johannesburg	Second Test

== Test matches ==
=== First test ===
2 June 1984

South Africa	33–15	England
Try: du Plessis; Gerber, Louw; Con: Heunis 3 Pen: Heunis 5		Pen: Hare 4 Drop: Horton

Boet Erasmus Stadium, Port Elizabeth
Referee: René Hourquet (France)

South Africa			England
Johan Heunis	FB	15	FB	Dusty Hare
Avril Williams	W	14	W	Mark Bailey (substituted off)
Danie Gerber	C	13	C	John Palmer
John Villet	C	12	C	Huw Davis
Carel du Plessis	W	11	W	David Trick
Errol Tobias	FH	10	FH	John Horton
Divan Serfontein	SH	9	SH	Richard Hill
Gerrie Sonnekus	N8	8	N8	Chris Butcher
(capt.) Theuns Stofberg	F	7	F	John Hall
Rob Louw	F	6	F	Peter Winterbottom
Rudi Visagie	L	5	L	John Scott (capt.)
Schalk Burger	L	4	L	John Fidler
Hempies du Toit	P	3	P	Phil Blakeway
Chris Rogers	H	2	H	Steve Mills
Ockie Oosthuizen	P	1	P	Malcolm Preedy
		Replacements
				Nick Stringer (substituted in)
		Coaches
Cecil Moss (South Africa)				(England) Dick Greenwood

=== Second test ===
9 June 1984

South Africa	35–9	England
Try: Gerber 3 Stofberg, Sonnekus, Tobias; Con: Heunis 3 Tobias; Pen: Heunis		Pen: Hare 3

Ellis Park Stadium, Johannesburg
Referee: René Hourquet (France)

South Africa			England
Johan Heunis	FB	15	FB	Dusty Hare
Avril Williams	W	14	W	Mark Bailey
Danie Gerber	C	13	C	John Palmer
John Villet	C	12	C	Huw Davis
Carel du Plessis	W	11	W	Tony Swift
Errol Tobias	FH	10	FH	John Horton
Divan Serfontein	SH	9	SH	Richard Hill
Gerrie Sonnekus	N8	8	N8	Chris Butcher
(capt.) Theuns Stofberg	F	7	F	Peter Winterbottom
Rob Louw	F	6	F	John Hall (substituted off)
Rudi Visagie	L	5	L	John Scott (capt.)
Schalk Burger	L	4	L	John Fidler
Hempies du Toit	P	3	P	Paul Rendall
Chris Rogers	H	2	H	Steve Brain
Ockie Oosthuizen	P	1	P	Gary Pearce
		Replacements
				Gary Rees (substituted in)
		Coaches
Cecil Moss (South Africa)				(England) Dick Greenwood

== Touring party ==
- Tour manager : Ron Jacobs
- Team manager: Derek Morgan
- Coach: Dick Greenwood
- Captain: John Scott (Cardiff) 31 caps

=== Backs ===
- Dusty Hare (Leicester) 23 caps
- Nick Stringer (Wasps) 2 caps
- Mark Bailey (Cambridge University) No caps
- Steve Burnhill (Loughborough Coll) No caps
- Paul Dodge (Leicester) 25 caps
- John Palmer (Bath) No caps
- Tony Swift (Swansea) 5 caps
- David Trick (Bath) 1 cap
- Huw Davies (Wasps) 12 caps
- Richard Hill (Bath) No caps
- John Horton (Bath) 11 caps
- Nick Youngs (Leicester) 6 caps
- Bryan Barley (Wakefield) 3 caps

=== Forwards ===
- Phil Blakeway (Gloucester) 14 caps
- Steve Brain (Coventry) No caps
- Chris Butcher (Harlequins) No caps
- David Cusani (Orrell) No caps
- John Fidler (Gloucester) 2 caps
- Jon Hall (Bath) 3 caps
- Steve Mills (Gloucester) 3 caps
- Gary Pearce (Northampton) 14 caps
- Malcolm Preedy (Gloucester) No caps
- Paul Rendall (Wasps) 1 cap
- Gary Rees (Nottingham) No caps
- John Scott (Cardiff) 31 caps
- Mike Teague (Gloucester) No caps
- Peter Winterbottom (Headingley) 13 caps

== See also ==
- History of rugby union matches between England and South Africa
