= 1983–84 Rugby Union County Championship =

English rugby union competition

1983–84 Thorn EMI County Championship
- Countries: England
- Champions: Gloucestershire (15th title)
- Runners-up: Somerset

The 1983–84 Thorn EMI Rugby Union County Championship was the 84th edition of England's County Championship rugby union club competition.

Gloucestershire won their 15th title after defeating Somerset in the final.

== First Round ==
Pos	First Division Group 1	P	W	D	L	F	A	Pts
1	Gloucestershire	3	3	0	0	64	25	6
2	Yorkshire	3	2	0	1	44	41	4
3	Northumberland	3	1	0	2	46	39	2
4	Surrey	3	0	0	3	17	65	0

Pos	First Division Group 2	P	W	D	L	F	A	Pts
1	Somerset	3	3	0	0	52	39	6
2	Middlesex	3	2	0	1	72	30	4
3	Lancashire	3	1	0	2	55	59	2
4	Devon	3	0	0	3	39	90	0

== Semi finals ==
Date	Venue	Team One	Team Two	Score
26 Nov	Kingsholm	Gloucestershire	Middlesex	13-12
26 Nov		Somerset	Yorkshire	

== Final ==
31 March 1984

Gloucestershire	36–18	Somerset
Try: Morley (2) Barnes, Harding, Hogg; Con: Barnes (3); Pen: Barnes (2)		Try: Rees; Con: Palmer; Pen: Palmer (4)

Twickenham
Referee: Fred Howard (Lancashire)

15	Phil Cue	Bristol
14	Alan Morley	Bristol
13	Ralph Knibbs	Bristol
12	Simon Hogg	Bristol
11	Richard Mogg	Gloucester
10	Stuart Barnes	Bristol
9	Richard Harding	Bristol
1	Malcolm Preedy	Gloucester
2	Steve Mills	Gloucester
3	Phil Blakeway	Gloucester
4	John Orwin	Gloucester
5	John Fidler	Gloucester
6	John Gadd	Gloucester
7	Mike Rafter (capt)	Bristol
8	Bob Hesford	Bristol
Replacements:
16	Kevin White	Gloucester
17	T Davis	Stroud
18	Mike Teague	Gloucester
19	Dave Sorrell	Bristol
20	Gordon Sargent	Gloucester
21	Steve Boyle	Gloucester

15	Charles Ralston	Bath
14	David Trick	Bath
13	John Palmer	Bath
12	Alun Rees	Bath
11	Paul Simmons	Bath
10	John Horton (capt)	Bath
9	Chris Stanley	Bath
1	Chris Lilley	Bath
2	Greg Bess	Bath
3	Maurice 'Richard' Lee	Bath
4	Peter Stiff	Bristol
5	Ronnie Hakin	Bath
6	Jon Hall	Bath
7	Roger Spurrell	Bath
8	Paul Simpson	Bath
Replacements:
16	N Hopkins	Weston-super-Mare
17	Keith Prosser	Bath
18	P Norris	Bridgwater
19	S Bagg	Weston-super-Mare
20	Nigel Redman	Bath
21	Paul Turner	Bath

== See also ==
- English rugby union system
- Rugby union in England
