= 1989–90 Pilkington Cup =

19th edition of English rugby competition

- Countries: England
- Champions: Bath
- Runners-up: Gloucester
- Highest attendance: 52,000 Bath v Gloucester at Twickenham

The 1989–90 Pilkington Cup was the 19th edition of England's premier rugby union club competition at that time. Bath won the competition defeating Gloucester in the final. The Bath victory was the biggest winning margin of any previous final, helped by the fact that Gloucester's John Gadd was dismissed from the field after 57 minutes for stamping on Dave Egerton. The event was sponsored by Pilkington and the final was held at Twickenham Stadium.

== Draw and results ==
=== First round ===
Home team	Away team	Score
Askeans	Redruth	10-18
Barking	Old Alleynians	16-12 aet
Barnstaple	Reading	10-6
Broughton Park	Aspatria	15-18
Cheshunt	London Scottish	0-27
Drybrook	Old Colfeians	19-10
Dudley Kingswinford	Vipers	13-11
Ealing	Metropolitan Police	10-14
Exeter	High Wycombe	12-7
Fylde	Kersal	27-12
Harrogate	Peterborough	54-7
Hartlepool Rovers	Old Yardleians	29-3
Havant	Southend	14-6
Lydney	Berry Hill	10-13
Lymm	Wakefield	9-18
Mansfield	Otley	0-29
Mid-Cheshire College	Crediton	20-0
Northern	Roundhay	31-16
North Walsham	Swanage & Wareham	15-3
Nuneaton	Stockwood Park	31-4
Old Leamingtonians	Newark	10-20
Oxford	Combe Down	11-17
Ruislip	Worthing	6-16
Sheffield	Rotherham	13-13 aet*
Sidcup	London Welsh	3-29
Stafford	Vale of Lune	9-25
Streatham-Croydon	Taunton	22-9
West Hartlepool	Bedworth	30-7

Away team progress*

=== Second round ===
Home team	Away team	Score
Barking	Rugby	3-38
Barnstaple	Richmond	7-22
Berry Hill	London Scottish	15-12
Blackheath	Havant	17-0
Combe Down	Gosforth	0-26
Exeter	Streatham-Croydon	44-7
Harrogate	Aspatria	21-13
Hartlepool Rovers	West Hartlepool	9-15
Headingley	Otley	15-9
Liverpool St Helens	Coventry	17-6
London Irish	Plymouth Albion	13-17
London Welsh	Drybrook	15-9
Mid-Cheshire College	Nuneaton	10-16
Newark	Fylde	12-28
Northampton	Northern	25-4
Redruth	North Walsham	0-22
Sale	Rotherham	43-10
Vale of Lune	Dudley Kingswinford	24-12
Wakefield	Waterloo	19-3
Worthing	Metropolitan Police	10-14

=== Third round ===
Home team	Away team	Score
Bath	Harlequins	9-0
Bedford	Richmond	7-12
Bristol	Liverpool St Helens	12-29
Fylde	Gosforth	15-17
Harrogate	West Hartlepool	3-12
Headingley	North Walsham	12-0
London Welsh	Leicester	3-43
Metropolitan Police	Northampton	4-16
Moseley	Berry Hill	28-11
Nuneaton	Saracens	7-16
Plymouth Albion	Orrell	0-7
Rosslyn Park	Nottingham	9-20
Sale	Blackheath	26-16
Vale of Lune	Exeter	13-18
Wakefield	Rugby	16-9
Wasps	Gloucester	19-23

=== Fourth round ===
Home team	Away team	Score
Bath	Headingley	25–3
Bristol	Exeter	26–3
Gosforth	Gloucester	15–26
Leicester	West Hartlepool	43–15
Moseley	Saracens	15–10
Northampton	Wakefield	22–10
Nottingham	Orrell	12–6
Richmond	Sale	14–12

=== Quarter-finals ===
Home team	Away team	Score
Moseley	Bristol	15–13
Northampton	Leicester	23–7
Nottingham	Gloucester	16–26
Richmond	Bath	3–35

=== Semi-finals ===
Home team	Away team	Score
Northampton	Gloucester	12–17
Moseley	Bath	7–21

=== Final ===
5 May 1990

Bath	48–6	Gloucester
Try: Swift 2 Withey; Guscott; Callard; Dawe; Redman; Ubogu; Con: Barnes 4 Halliday; Pen: Barnes 2		Try: Dunn; Con: Smith

Twickenham Stadium, London
Attendance: 52,000
Referee: Fred Howard (Liverpool)

Bath
Gloucester

16	Jonathan Callard
15	Tony Swift
14	Simon Halliday
12	Jeremy Guscott
11	Adedayo Adebayo
10	Stuart Barnes (c)
9	Richard Hill
8	Dave Egerton
7	Kevin Withey
6	Andy Robinson
5	Damian Cronin
4	Nigel Redman
3	Gareth Chilcott
2	Graham Dawe
1	Victor Ubogu
Replacements:
16	Steve Knight for Hill
17	Maurice 'Richard' Lee
18	Nick Maslen
19	Jimmy Deane
20	Jonathan Webb
21	John Bamsey
Coach:
Jack Rowell

15	Tim Smith
14	Derrick Morgan
13	Don Caskie
12	Richard Mogg
11	Jim Breeze
10	Mike Hamlin (c)
9	Marcus Hannaford
8	Mike Teague
7	Ian Smith
6	John Gadd
5	John Brain
4	Nigel Scrivens
3	Richard Pascal
2	Kevin Dunn
1	Malcolm Preedy
Replacements:
16	Damian Cummins
17	Lloyd Gardiner
18	John Hawker
19	Pete Jones
20	Dave Sims
21	Paul Ashmead
Coach:
Keith Richardson
