= 1982 England rugby union tour of Canada and the United States =

Summary
P	W	D	L
Total
8	8	0	0
Test match
2	2	0	0
Opponent
P	W	D	L
Canada
1	1	0	0
United States
1	1	0	0

The 1982 England rugby union tour of Canada and the United States was a series of eight matches played by the England national rugby union team in Canada and the United States in May and June 1982. The tour was entirely successful as the England team won all its eight matches and conceded only 34 points. England did not award full international caps for the internationals against Canada and the United States.

== Matches ==
Scores and results list England's points tally first.

Opposing Team	For	Against	Date	Venue
Eastern Canada	52	3	24 May	Toronto
CANADA	43	6	29 May	Swangard Stadium, Burnaby
Cougars	26	6	2 June	Bethell, Seattle
Pacific Coast	28	6	5 June	Long Beach, California
Western RFU	45	6	9 June	Dallas
Mid-West RFU	58	7	13 June	Cleveland, Ohio
Eastern RFU	41	0	16 June	Gaelic Park, New York City
UNITED STATES	59	0	19 June	Dillon Stadium, Hartford, Connecticut

== Touring party ==
- Manager: Budge Rogers
- Assistant manager: Mike Davis
- Captain: Steve Smith

=== Full back ===
- Dusty Hare (Leicester)
- Nick Stringer (Wasps)

=== Three-quarters ===
- John Carleton (Orrell)
- Clive Woodward (Leicester)
- Tony Bond (Sale)
- Tony Swift (Swansea)
- Neil McDowell (Gosforth)
- Steve Holdstock (Nottingham)

=== Half-backs ===
- Les Cusworth (Leicester)
- Peter Williams (Orrell)
- Steve Smith (Sale)
- Nigel Melville (Wakefield)

=== Forwards ===
- John Scott (Cardiff)
- Peter Winterbottom (Headingley)
- David Cooke Harlequins
- John Gadd (Gloucester)
- Nick Jeavons (Moseley)
- Maurice Colclough (Angoulême)
- Jim Syddall (Waterloo)
- Steve Bainbridge (Gosforth)
- Gary Pearce (Northampton)
- Phil Blakeway (Gloucester)
- Paul Rendall (Wasps)
- Malcolm Preedy (Gloucester)
- Peter Wheeler (Leicester)
- Steve Mills (Gloucester)
