= 1983–84 John Player Cup =

Rugby cup

Tournament statistics

The 1983–84 John Player Cup was the 13th edition of England's premier rugby union club competition at the time. Bath won the competition defeating Bristol in the final. The event was sponsored by John Player cigarettes and the final was held at Twickenham Stadium.

== Draw and results ==
=== First round ===
| Team one | Team two | Score |
|---|---|---|
| Betteshanger Colliery | Worthing | 11–20 |
| Norwich | Guildford & Godalming | 9–3 |
| Richmond | Saracens | 22–16 |
| Tabard | U.S. Portsmouth | 9–15 |
| Aspatria | West Hartlepool | 3-20 |
| Morley | Alsager College | 38–4 |
| Fylde | Alnwick | 43–21 |
| Newark | Dudley Kingswinford | 28–6 |
| Nottingham | Solihull | 29–3 |
| Nuneaton | Walsall | 19–6 |
| Vipers | Bedford Athletic | 18–9 |
| High Wycombe | Launceston | 7–0 |
| Henley | Maidenhead | 12-12 * |
| Old Redcliffians | Devon & Cornwall Police | 7–6 |
| Stroud | Bournemouth | 15–0 |

=== Second round ===
| Team one | Team two | Score |
|---|---|---|
| High Wycombe | Lydney | 18–28 |
| Norwich | Henley | 21–15 |
| Nottingham | Newark | 36–3 |
| Nuneaton | Fylde | 33–21 |
| Richmond | U.S. Portsmouth | 43–0 |
| Southend | KCS Old Boys | 24–3 |
| Stroud | Dartfordians | 18–4 |
| Vipers | Stourbridge | 3–13 |
| West Hartlepool | Morley | 6-6 |
| Worthing | Old Redcliffians | 6-25 |

=== Third round ===
| Team one | Team two | Score |
|---|---|---|
| Norwich | Bristol | 3-24 |
| Nuneaton | Richmond | 6–9 |

=== Fourth round ===
| Team one | Team two | Score |
|---|---|---|
| Bristol | London Welsh | 36-8 |
| Plymouth Argyle | Harlequins | 16-17 |
| Waterloo | Richmond | 26-19 |
| Coventry | London Irish | 16-7 |
| London Scottish | Northampton | 34-6 |
| Moseley | Nottingham | 3-10 |
| Orrell | Wasps | 15-15* |
| Blackheath | Bath | 12-41 |

Wasps progress due to more tries*

=== Quarter-finals ===
| Team one | Team two | Score |
|---|---|---|
| Waterloo | Bristol | 9-12 |
| Nottingham | London Scottish | 22-16 |
| Coventry | Harlequins | 16-24 |
| Bath | Wasps | 26-12 |

=== Semi-finals ===
| Team one | Team two | Score |
|---|---|---|
| Nottingham | Bath | 3-12 |
| Bristol | Harlequins | 21-18 |

=== Final ===
28 April 1984

| Bath | 10–9 | Bristol |
| Try: Simpson; Pen: Palmer; Drop: Horton | | Try: Harding; Con: Barnes; Pen: Barnes |

Twickenham Stadium, London
Attendance: 21,000
Referee: Roger Quittenton (London)

Bath
Bristol

| 15 | Chris Martin |
| 14 | David Trick |
| 13 | Alun Rees |
| 12 | John Palmer |
| 11 | Barry Trevaskis |
| 10 | John Horton |
| 9 | Richard Hill |
| 8 | Paul Simpson |
| 7 | Roger Spurrell (c) |
| 6 | Nigel Redman |
| 5 | Nigel Gaymond |
| 4 | Jon Hall |
| 3 | Maurice 'Richard' Lee |
| 2 | Rob Cunningham |
| 1 | Gareth Chilcott |
Replacements:
| 16 | Alun Watkins |
| 17 | Chris Stanley |
| 18 | Greg Bess |
| 19 | Ronnie Hakin |
| 20 | Paul Turner |
| 21 | Chris Lilley |
Coach:
Jack Rowell

| A | Phil Cue |
| B | Alan Morley |
| C | Simon Hogg |
| D | Ralph Knibbs |
| E | John Carr |
| F | Stuart Barnes |
| G | Richard Harding |
| H | John Doubleday |
| I | Dave Palmer |
| J | Austin Sheppard |
| K | Peter Stiff |
| L | Nigel Pomphrey |
| M | Pete Polledri |
| N | Mike Rafter (c) |
| O | D Chidgey |
Replacements:
| 16 | John Watson |
| 17 | Huw Duggan |
| 18 | Lawrence Yandell |
| 19 | Kevin Bogira |
| 20 | Darryll Hickey |
| 21 | Malcolm Baker |
Coach:
Dave Tyler
