= 1981 England rugby union tour of Argentina =

- Manager: Derek Morgan
- Tour captain: Bill Beaumont
Summary
P	W	D	L
Total
7	6	1	0
Test match
2	1	1	0
Opponent
P	W	D	L
Argentina
2	1	1	0

England were the first of the Home Nations to tour Argentina, and to take advantage of the recent International Board (IB) ruling that full caps could be awarded for matches against non-IB countries. England had intended to tour Argentina in 1973, but that was cancelled following terrorist threats and the side went to Fiji and New Zealand instead.

== Touring party ==
- Manager: Derek Morgan
- Assistant manager: Mike Davis
- Captain: Bill Beaumont (Fylde) 30 caps

Player	Club	Caps	Position	Matches played	Score				Total points
Player	Club	Caps	Position	Matches played	Tries	Conv.	Pen.	Drop	Total points
Dusty Hare	Leicester	10	Full back	4	0	8	7		37
Brian Patrick	Gosforth	0	Full back	3	2	9	5		41
John Carleton	Orrell	9	Wing	5	5				20
Tony Swift	Swansea	0	Wing	4	3				12
David Trick	Bath	0	Wing	3	4				16
Paul Dodge	Leicester	14	Centre	7	2				8
Nick Preston	Richmond	3	Centre	3	2				8
Clive Woodward	Leicester	8	Centre	4	2				8
Huw Davies	Cambridge University	3	Fly Half	4	4				16
John Horton	Bath	9	Fly Half	3					0
Nigel Melville	Wasps	0	Scrum half	3	1				4
Steve Smith	Sale	18	Scrum half	4					0
Steve Mills	Gloucester	0	Hooker	4					0
Andy Simpson	Sale	0	Hooker	3	1				4
Clint McGregor	Angouléme	0	Prop	3					0
Gary Pearce	Northampton	4	Prop	6					0
Paul Rendall	Wasps	0	Prop	1					0
Colin Smart	Newport	6	Prop	5	1				4
Steve Bainbridge	Gosforth	0	Lock	4					0
Bill Beaumont	Fylde	30	Lock	6					0
John Fidler	Gloucester	0	Lock	4					0
David Cooke	Harlequins	4	Flanker	3					0
Nick Jeavons	Moseley	3	Flanker	6					0
Mike Rafter	Bristol	15	Flanker	4					0
John Scott	Cardiff	18	No.8	5	1				4
Bob Hesford	Bristol	1	No.8	2	2				8

== Matches ==
Complete list of matches played by England in Argentina:

16 May 1981

San Isidro Club	14–20	England
Try: Aguirre, Loffreda; Pen: Loffreda 2		Try: Carleton; Swift 2, Smart; Con: Hare 2

Ferro Carril Oeste, Buenos Aires
Referee: José María Cabanas (Argentina)

San Isidro Club: F. Argerich; F. Sainz Trápaga, M. Perez Coba, M. Loffreda, L. Corral (F. Aguirre); R. Madero, A. Soares Gache; T. Petersen, R. de Vedis (c), R. Lucke; C. Durlech, M. Glestra; C. Seinz Trápaga, J. Perez Cabo, F. Insua
England: D. Hare; J. Carleton, C. Woodward, P. Dodge, A. Swift; J. Horton, S. Smith; N. Jeavana, J. Scott, M. Rafter; W. Beaumont (c), J. Fidler; C. Smart, A. Simpson, C. McGregar

19 May 1981

Combinado Regional del Norte (Note: The "Combinado Regional del Norte (Regional North Combined)" was composed of players from the provincial unions of Córdoba, Salta and Tucumán.)	12–36	England
Try: Bobadilla; Con: Sauce; Pen: Sauce 2		Try: Patrick 2, Davies 2 Carleton, Trick; Scott, Preston; Con: Patrick

Club Belgrano, Córdoba
Referee: Ricardo Colombo (Argentina)

Regional del Norte: G. Bustos (Córdoba); P. Bobadilla (Córdoba), R. Mas Dan (Córdoba), M. Ambroggio (Cordoba), Guran (Tucumán); G. Palau (Tucumán), R. Sauce (Tucumán); M. Martinez (Cordoba), R. Hyleveld (Cordoba), M. Espósito (Cordoba); E. Amador (Cordoba), R. Passaglia (Cordoba) (c); E. Rodríguez (Cordoba), H. Bianchi (Cordoba), J. Ferro (Tucumán), (A. Sanchez Salta)
England: B. Patrick; D. Track, R. Dodge, N. Preston, J. Carleton; G. Davies, N. Melville; D. Cooke, J. Scott, R. Hesford; W. Beaumont (c), S. Bainbridge; P. Rendell (C. Smart), S. Milla, G. Pearce

23 May 1981

Buenos Aires RU	25–34	England
Try: Courreges, Sainz Trápaga; Con: Beccer Varela; Pen: Beccer Varela, Sanguinetti		Try: Dodge 2 Swift, Hesford; Con: Hare 3 Pen: Hare 4

Ferro Carril Oeste, Buenos Aires
Referee: Douglas Kerr

Buenos Aires: F. Argerich; A. Puccio (J. Palma), E. Sanguinetti, G. Lorenzo, F. Seinz Trápaga; G. Beccer Varela, A. Nicholson (c); J. Allen (C. Neyra), R. Sanz, R. de Vedia; M. Iachetti, M. Glastra; F. Insúa, A. Courreges, P. Devoto
England: W. Hare; J. Carleton, S. Woodward, P. Dodge, T. Swift; H. Davies, S. Smith; N. Jeavons, J. Scott, D. Cooke (B. Hesford); S. Baindridge, W. Beaumont (c); J. Smart, S. Milla, G. Pearce

25 May 1981

Combinado Regional del Sur (Note: The "Combinado Regional del Sur (Regional South Combined)" was composed of players from the provincial unions of Mar del Plata, Sur and Tandil.)	3–47	England XV
Pen: Cutuk		Try: Trick, Carleton 3 Hesford, Preston; Simpson, Melville; Con: Patrick 6 Pen: Patrick

Parque Camet, Mar del Plata
Referee: Carlos Gregotti

Combinado Sur: L. Elissando (Tandil); D. De Pau (Mar del Plata), V. Cutuk (Sur) G. Paulucci (Mar del Plata) R. Bonavita (Mar del Plata); G. Pedroza (Mar del Plata), A. Valderrey (Mar del Plata); O. Varade (Mar del Plata), M. Riego (Mar del Plata), J. Feullassier (Mar del Plata); D. Rotelo (Mar del Plata), B. Minguez (Mar del Plata) (c); H. Bruno (Mar del Plata), R. Rovere (Tandil) (N. Bosso (Mar del Plata), J. Quaglia (Sur)
England: B. Patrick; J. Carleton, P. Dodge, N. Preston, D. Trick; J. Hartan, N. Melville; M. Rafter (c), R. Hesford, N. Jeavons; S. Bainbridge, J. Fidler;

=== First test ===
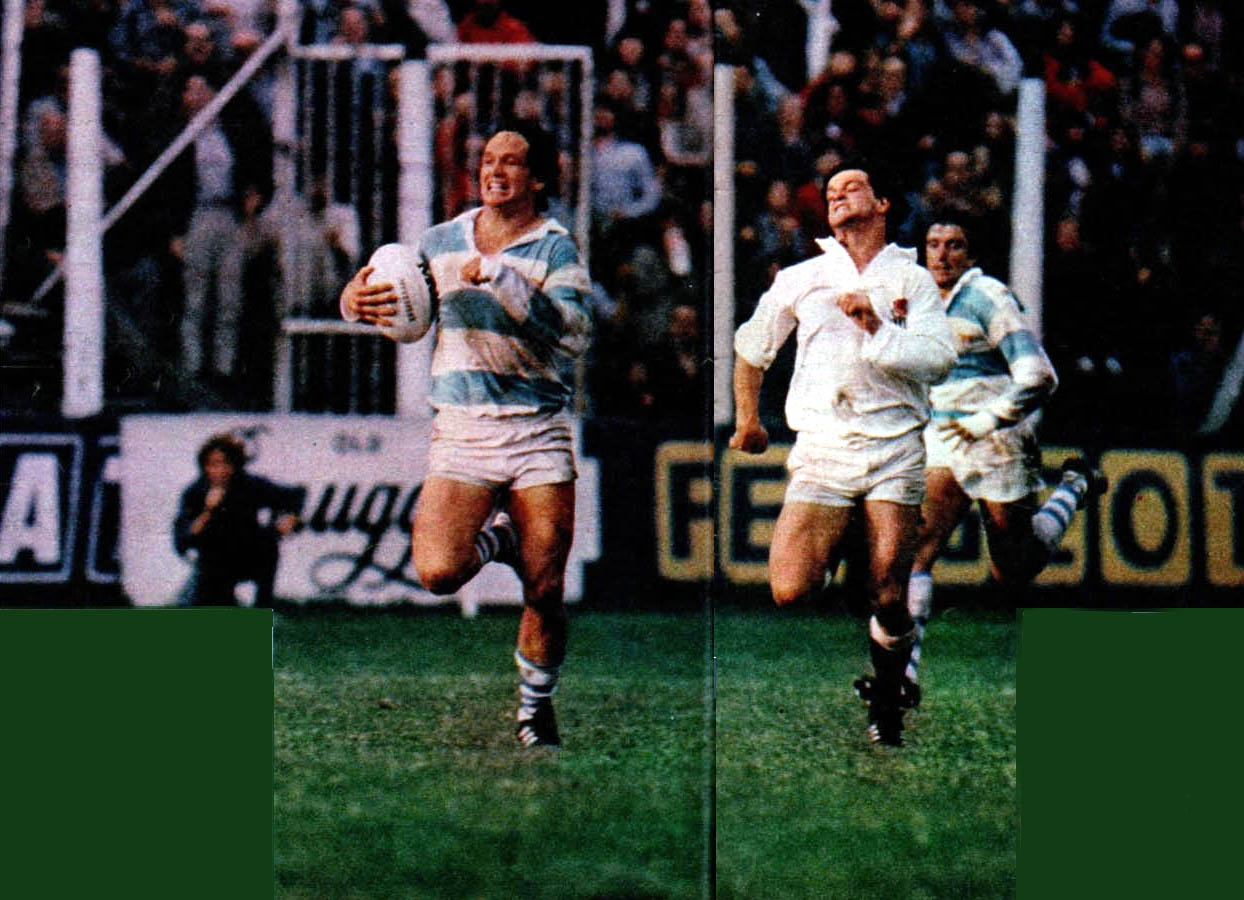
A moment of the first test v Argentina at Ferro Carril Oeste

30 May 1981

Argentina	19–19	England
Try: Campo 2 Con: Porta; Pen: Porta; Drop: Landajo, Porta	Report	Try: Davies, Woodward 2 Con: Hare 2 Pen: Hare

Ferro Carril Oeste, Buenos Aires
Attendance: 28,000
Referee: Jean-Pierre Bonnet (France)

Team details

Argentina	England

Daniel Baetti	FB	15	FB	Dusty Hare
Marcelo Campo	W	14	W	John Carleton
Marcelo Loffreda	C	13	C	Paul Dodge
Rafael Madero	C	12	C	Clive Woodward
Adolfo Cappelletti	W	11	W	Tony Swift
(c) Hugo Porta	FH	10	FH	Huw Davies
Tomás Landajo	SH	9	SH	Steve Smith
Gabriel Travaglini	N8	8	N8	John Scott
Tomás Petersen ]	F	6	F	Mike Rafter
Ernesto Ure	F	7	F	Nick Jeavons
Alejandro Iachetti	L	5	L	John Fidler
Eliseo Branca	L	4	L	Bill Beaumont (c)
Fernando Morel	P	3	P	Gary Pearce
Javier Pérez Cobo	H	2	H	Steve Mills
Topo Rodriguez	P	1	P	Colin Smart

2 June 1981

Combinado Regional del Litoral (Note: The "Combinado Regional del Litoral (Litoral Combined)", a selection of players from the north east of Argentina) was theoretically composed of players from the provincial selections of Rosario, Entre Ríos and Santa Fe. Nevertheless, the team that played England was composed of players from Rosario exclusively.)	21–25	England
Try: Minoldo, Minaldo; Con: Baetti, Dip; Pen: Baetti (2), Dip		Try: Trick (2); Con: Patrick; Pen: Patrick; Drop: Horton

Jockey Club Stadium, Rosario

Regional del Litoral D. Baetti; A. Piscione; J. Escalante, A. Trini, D. Giner; M. Dip, R. Cestagna; C. Marengo, V. Macet, G. Minoldo (J. Comba); G. Milano, J. Mangimelli (c); C. Fernández, C. Cristini, A. Risler
England: B. Patrick; J. Carleton, P. Dodge, N. Prestan, D. Trick; P. Horton, N. Melville; R. Hesford, D. Cocke, N. Jeavons; S. Bainbridge, W. Beaumont (c); G. Pearce, A. Simpson, C. McGregor

=== Second test ===
6 June 1981

Argentina	6–12	England
Try: Travaglini; Con: Porta		Try: Davies; Con: Hare; Pen: Hare 2

Ferro Carril Oeste, Buenos Aires
Referee: Jean-Pierre Bonnet (France)

Team details

Argentina	England

Daniel Baetti	FB	15	FB	Dusty Hare
Marcelo Campo	W	14	W	John Carleton
Marcelo Loffreda	C	13	C	Paul Dodge
Rafael Madero	C	12	C	Clive Woodward
Adolfo Cappelletti	W	11	W	Tony Swift
(c) Hugo Porta	FH	10	FH	Huw Davies
Tomás Landajo	SH	9	SH	Steve Smith
Gabriel Travaglini	N8	8	N8	John Scott
Ernesto Ure	F	7	F	Mike Rafter
Tomás Petersen	F	6	F	Nick Jeavons
Alejandro Iachetti	L	5	L	John Fidler
Eliseo Branca	L	4	L	Bill Beaumont (c)
Fernando Morel	P	3	P	Gary Pearce
Javier Pérez Cobo	H	2	H	Steve Mills
Topo Rodriguez	P	1	P	Colin Smart
		Replacements
Juan Pablo Piccardo	C	16
