= 1993–94 Pilkington Cup =

English rugby union competition

- Countries: England
- Champions: Bath (8th title)
- Runners-up: Leicester

The 1993–94 Pilkington Cup was the 23rd edition of England's premier rugby union club competition at the time. Bath won the competition defeating Leicester in the final. The event was sponsored by Pilkington and the final was held at Twickenham Stadium.

== Draw and results ==
=== First round (Sep 11) ===
Home	Away	Score
Alton	St Ives	8-23
Berry Hill	Henley	15-20
Bradford & Bingley	Tynedale	12-6
Brixham	Reading	17-14
Broadstreet	Birmingham & Solihull	6-17
Camborne	Wimborne	22-14
Cheshunt	High Wycombe	8-14
Chiltern	Worthing	8-0
Durham City	Wolverhampton	14-8
Kettering	Widnes	8-3
Lichfield	Walsall	9-14
London Welsh	Windsor	44-0
Lydney	Maidstone	64-0
New Brighton	Wigton	14-8
North Walsham	Metropolitan Police	22-3
Nuneaton	Hereford	9-11
Old Mid-Whitgiftians	Bridgwater & Albion	8-12
Preston Grasshoppers	Stoke	38-0
Ruislip	Tabard	5-30
Scunthorpe	Wharfedale	6-59
Southend	Cambridge	11-20
Stockton	Syston	8-11
Stourbridge	Camp Hill	15-10
Stroud	Basingstoke	12-16
Westcombe Park	Ealing	20-16
Weston-super-Mare	Barking	10-39
Winnington Park	Rotherham	15-13
York	Kendal	16-15

=== Second round (Oct 16) ===
Home	Away	Score
Amersham & Chilton	London Welsh	5-23
Askeans	Basingstoke	0-6
Aspatria	Stourbridge	17-22
Birmingham & Solihull	Harrogate	7-3
Bradford & Bingley	Bedford	23-15
Brixham	North Walsham	3-3*
Broughton Park	Morley	6-5
Camborne	Bridgwater & Albion	20-21
Coventry	York	33-19
Exeter	Clifton	6-9
Henley	St Ives	65-0
High Wycombe	Preston Grasshoppers	9-20
Leeds	Kettering	6-13
Lydney	Havant	11-16
New Brighton	Liverpool St Helens	17-12
Plymouth Albion	Barking	22-11
Redruth	Rosslyn Park	6-30
Richmond	Blackheath	21-23
Sheffield	Hereford	9-8
Syston	Fylde	9-15
Tabard	Sudbury	9-33
Walsall	Wharfedale	17-22
Westcombe Park	Cambridge	6-21
Winnington Park	Durham City	37-3

Away team progress *

=== Third round (Nov 27) ===
Home	Away	Score
Blackheath	London Welsh	21-9
Birmingham & Solihull	Broughton Park	13-3
Bradford	Fylde	6-13
Clifton	Bridgwater & Albion	12-24
Coventry	Preston Grasshoppers	10-5
Havant	Cambridge	24-13
Henley	North Walsham	17-3
Kettering	Stourbridge	6-13
New Brighton	Winnington Park	3-16
Rosslyn Park	Plymouth Albion	38-7
Sheffield	Wharfedale	0-20
Sudbury	Basingstoke	6-25

=== Fourth round (Dec 18) ===
Home	Away	Score
Bath	Wasps	24-11
Blackheath	Leicester	10-16
Bristol	Henley	46-6
Harlequins	Basingstoke	52-3
Havant	London Irish	13-18
London Scottish	Fylde	6-8
Moseley	Winnington Park	32-6
Newcastle Gosforth	Bridgwater & Albion	53-10
Northampton	Waterloo	22-3
Nottingham	Gloucester	9-29
Orrell	Stourbridge	55-3
Otley	Wharfedale	20-5
Rosslyn Park	Coventry	22-15
Rugby	Sale	13-17
Saracens	Birmingham & Solihull	26-3
Wakefield	West Hartlepool	17-18

=== Fifth round (Jan 22) ===
Home	Away	Score
Bath	Bristol	14–9
Gloucester	Northampton	11–6
Harlequins	West Hartlepool	23–15
Leicester	London Irish	43–10
Moseley	Fylde	15–6
Newcastle Gosforth	Orrell	7–12
Otley	Sale	7–58
Rosslyn Park	Saracens	12–29

=== Quarter-finals (Feb 26) ===
Home	Away	Score
Gloucester	Orrell	3–10
Harlequins	Sale	26–13
Leicester	Moseley	12–6
Saracens	Bath	6–23

=== Semi-finals (Apr 2) ===
Home	Away	Score
Orrell	Leicester	18–31
Harlequins	Bath	25–26

=== Final ===
7 May 1994

Bath	21–9	Leicester
Try: Swift; Catt; Con: Callard; Pen: Callard 3		Pen: Harris 3

Twickenham Stadium, London
Attendance: 68,000
Referee: Ed Morrison (Bristol)

Bath
Leicester

16	Jon Callard
15	Tony Swift
14	Phil de Glanville
12	Mike Catt
11	Adedayo Adebayo
10	Stuart Barnes
9	Richard Hill
8	Ben Clarke
7	Jon Hall (c)
6	Andy Robinson
5	Andy Reed
4	Nigel Redman
3	Victor Ubogu
2	Graham Dawe
1	Dave Hilton
Replacements:
16	Ian Sanders
17	Tim Beddow
18	John Mallett
19	Steve Ojomoh for Robinson (49m)
20	Ed Rayner
21	Audley Lumsden
Coach:
Jack Rowell

O	Wayne Kilford
N	Tony Underwood
M	Stuart Potter
L	Laurence Boyle
K	Rory Underwood
J	Jez Harris
I	Aadel Kardooni
G	Dean Richards (c)
H	Neil Back
F	John Wells
E	Matt Poole
D	Martin Johnson
C	Darren Garforth
B	Richard Cockerill
A	Graham Rowntree
Replacements:
P	Niall Malone
Q	Jamie Hamilton
R	Derek Jelley
S	Chris Johnson
T	Chris Tarbuck
U	Bill Drake-Lee
Coach:
Ian "Dosser" Smith
