= 1989 British Lions tour to Australia =

- Date: 15 May – 16 July 1989
- Coach: Ian McGeechan
- Tour captain: Finlay Calder
- Test series winners: British Lions (2–1)
- Top point scorers: Peter Dods (66); Gavin Hastings (66)
- Top try scorer: Brendan Mullin (7)
- Top test point scorer: Gavin Hastings (28)
- Top test try scorers: Jeremy Guscott (1); Gavin Hastings (1); Ieuan Evans (1)
Summary
| P | W | D | L |
Total
| 12 | 11 | 0 | 1 |
Opponent
| P | W | D | L |
Australia
| 3 | 2 | 0 | 1 |

Tour chronology
- ← New Zealand 1983 New Zealand 1993 →

Between May and July 1989, the British Lions toured Australia. It was their first tour of Australia since 1971, and followed their 1983 tour of New Zealand. The tour was led by coach Ian McGeechan and manager Clive Rowlands. Scotland's Finlay Calder was team captain of the tour.

Across three Test matches, the British Lions won the tour 2–1, the first victory since their 1974 tour of South Africa.

== Background ==
After not touring for six years due to the sporting boycott of South Africa, the British Lions undertook its first sole tour of Australia since 1899. Since their 1955 tour of South Africa, the Lions had regularly toured their traditional Southern Hemisphere rivals (Australia, New Zealand, South Africa) between two, three, and four year phases. The Lions' previous tour, 1983, was their first sole tour of New Zealand. 1983, just like their prior two tours (1980, 1977) were both unsuccessful, which led expectations to be modest going into the 1989 tour. With increasing club commitments and skepticism from media and administrators about its future, the Lions tour concept itself had faced declining relevance.

== Test schedule and results ==
The Lions suffered a 30–12 defeat in the first test in Sydney on 1 July, then their heaviest defeat by Australia. In this first test, Australia scored four tries, and flyhalf Michael Lynagh kicked 5 from 6. For the second and third tests, changes included Mike Teague, recovered from injury, at blindside flanker; Rob Andrew replacing Craig Chalmers at fly-half; and Jeremy Guscott and Scott Hastings coming into the centre positions. The team became the only Lions team ever to come from 1–0 down to win a series, winning the second test in Brisbane 19–12 and the third test in Sydney 19–18. The Lions completed their tour with a victory of a combined ANZAC team. Teague was named player of the series.

=== Results ===
| Date | Home team | Score | Away team | Result | Venue | Ref |
|---|---|---|---|---|---|---|
| 10 June | Western Australia | 0–40 | British Lions | Won | Perry Lakes Stadium, Perth, Western Australia | |
| 14 June | Australia B | 18–23 | British Lions | Won | Olympic Park Stadium, Melbourne, Victoria | |
| 19 June | Queensland | 15–19 | British Lions | Won | Ballymore Stadium, Brisbane, Queensland | |
| 21 June | Queensland B | 6–30 | British Lions | Won | Barlow Park, Cairns, Queensland | |
| 24 June | New South Wales | 21–23 | British Lions | Won | North Sydney Oval, North Sydney, New South Wales | |
| 27 June | New South Wales B | 19–39 | British Lions | Won | Apex Oval, Dubbo, New South Wales | |
| 1 July | Australia | 30–12 | British Lions | Lost | Sydney Football Stadium, Moore Park, New South Wales | |
| 4 July | Australian Capital Territory | 25–41 | British Lions | Won | Seiffert Oval, Queanbeyan, New South Wales | |
| 8 July | Australia | 12–19 | British Lions | Won | Ballymore Stadium, Brisbane, Queensland | |
| 15 July | Australia | 18–19 | British Lions | Won | Sydney Football Stadium, Moore Park, New South Wales | |
| 19 July | New South Wales Country | 13–72 | British Lions | Won | No. 2 Sportsground, Newcastle West, New South Wales | |
| 23 July | ANZAC XV | 15–19 | British Lions | Won | Ballymore Stadium, Brisbane, Queensland | |

== Squad ==
=== Backs ===
| Name | Home country | Club | Notes |
|---|---|---|---|
| Rob Andrew | England | Wasps | |
| Gary Armstrong | Scotland | Jedforest | |
| Craig Chalmers | Scotland | Melrose | |
| Tony Clement | Wales | Swansea | |
| Paul Dean | Ireland | St Mary's College | |
| John Devereux | Wales | Bridgend | |
| Peter Dods | Scotland | Gala | |
| Ieuan Evans | Wales | Llanelli | |
| Jeremy Guscott | England | Bath | replaced injured Will Carling |
| Mike Hall | Wales | Bridgend | |
| Gavin Hastings | Scotland | London Scottish | |
| Scott Hastings | Scotland | Watsonians | |
| Robert Jones | Wales | Swansea | |
| Brendan Mullin | Ireland | London Irish | |
| Chris Oti | England | Wasps | |
| Will Carling | England | Harlequins | Selected but withdrew due to injury |
| Rory Underwood | England | Leicester and RAF | |

=== Forwards ===
| Name | Home country | Club | Notes |
|---|---|---|---|
| Paul Ackford | England | Harlequins | |
| Finlay Calder (capt) | Scotland | Stewart's Melville FP | |
| Gareth Chilcott | England | Bath | |
| Wade Dooley | England | Preston Grasshoppers | |
| Mike Griffiths | Wales | Bridgend | |
| John Jeffrey | Scotland | Kelso | |
| Donal Lenihan | Ireland | Cork Constitution | |
| Brian Moore | England | Nottingham | |
| Bob Norster | Wales | Cardiff | |
| Dean Richards | England | Leicester | |
| Andy Robinson | England | Bath | |
| Steve Smith | Ireland | Ballymena | |
| David Sole | Scotland | Edinburgh Academicals | |
| Mike Teague | England | Gloucester | |
| Derek White | Scotland | London Scottish | |
| Dai Young | Wales | Cardiff | |

== Citations ==
- Thomas, Clem (1996). The History of the British Lions. Mainstream Publishing. ISBN 978-1840180008.
