= Rudi Visagie =

South African rugby union footballer (born 1959)

- Born: Rudolf Gerhardus Visagie; 27 June 1959 (age 67) Nelspruit, South Africa
- Height: 1.98 m (6 ft 6 in)
- Weight: 138 kg (304 lb)
- School: Rob Ferreira High School, White River

Rugby union career
- Position: Lock
Provincial / State sides
Years	Team	Apps	(Points)
1980–1986	Free State	109	
1987–1993	Natal	109	
1994–1995	Lowveld	?	
1996	South Eastern Transvaal	16	
International career
Years	Team	Apps	(Points)
1984–1993	South Africa	5	

Rudolf Gerhardus Visagie (born 27 June 1959 in Nelspruit, South Africa) is a former South African rugby union player, who played lock.

== Playing career ==
Visagie made his provincial debut for the Free State in 1980. He played 109 matches for Free State during the seven seasons with the union. In 1987, Visagie joined the Natal and also played 109 matches in seven seasons for Natal. After Natal, Visagie played for Lowveld and South Eastern Transvaal.

Visagie made his test debut for the Springboks in 1984 against the touring English team captained by John Scott. Visagie played in all four test matches during the 1984 season, after which nine years lapsed before his next test match in 1993 against France. Visagie also toured with the Springboks to Australia in 1993. He did not play in any tests during the 1993 tour, but played in 4 tour matches, scoring one try. He was known for his great ball- and running skills, and was a very strong scrummaging lock.

=== Test history ===
No.	Opposition	Result (SA 1st)	Position	Tries	Date	Venue
1.	England	33–15	Lock		2 June 1984	Boet Erasmus Stadium, Port Elizabeth
2.	England	35–9	Lock		9 June 1984	Ellis Park, Johannesburg
3.	South American Jaguars	32–15	Lock		20 October 1984	Loftus Versveld, Pretoria
4.	South American Jaguars	21–13	Lock		27 October 1984	Newlands, Cape Town
5.	France	20–20	Lock		26 June 1993	Kings Park, Durban

== Trivia ==
With a weight of 138 kg, Visagie holds the record as the heaviest Springbok rugby player.

== See also ==
- List of South Africa national rugby union players – Springbok no. 536
