= Chris Rogers (rugby union) =

South African rugby union footballer (born 1956)

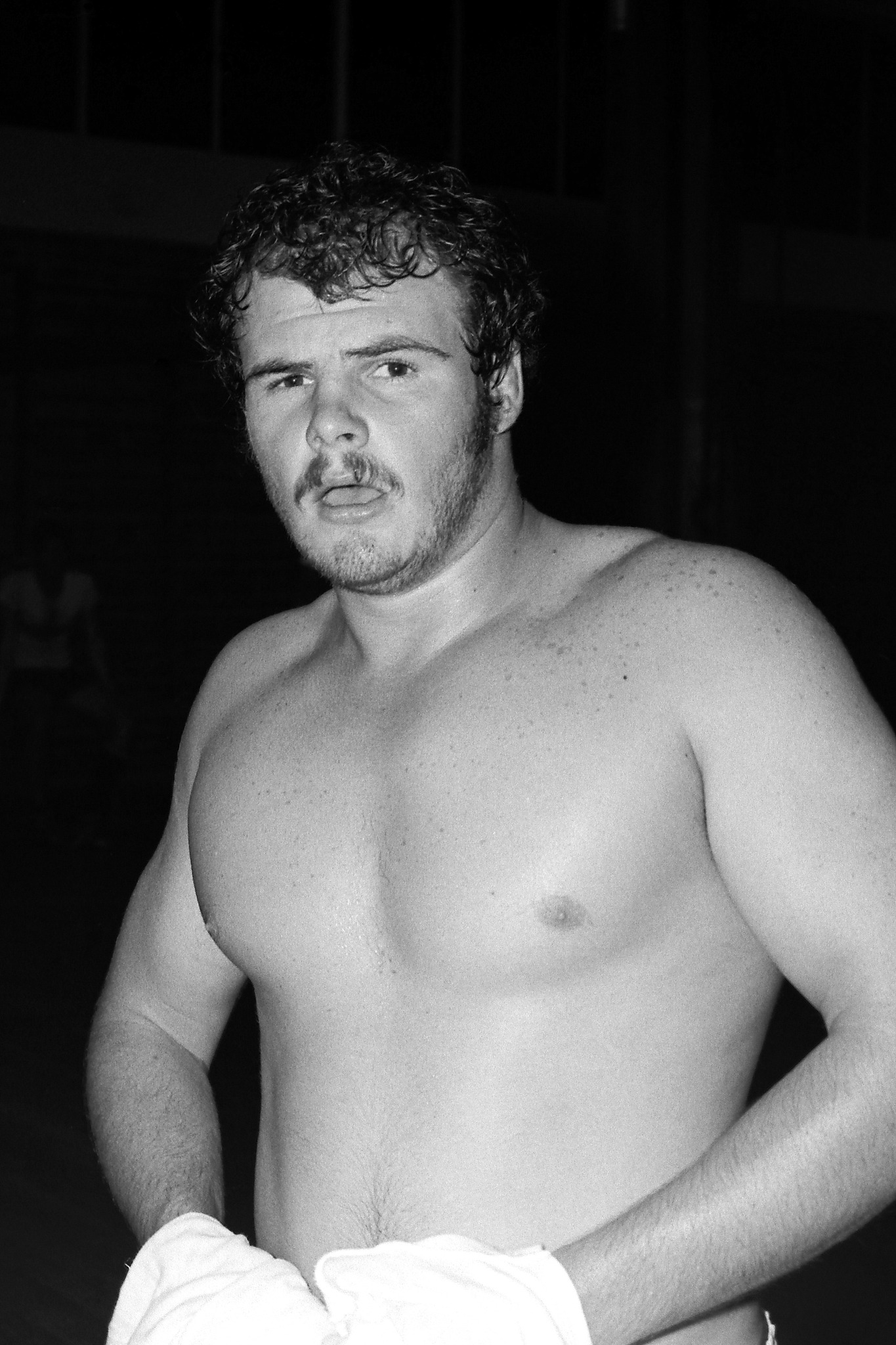
- Born: Christopher David Rogers; 10 October 1956 (age 70) Masvingo, formerly Fort Victoria, Zimbabwe
- Height: 1.80 m (5 ft 11 in)
- Weight: 95 kg (209 lb)
- School: Milton High School, Bulawayo, Zimbabwe

Rugby union career
- Position: Hooker
Provincial / State sides
Years	Team	Apps	(Points)
1977	Rhodesia		
	Transvaal	93	
1988	Northern Transvaal	7	
International career
Years	Team	Apps	(Points)
1984	South Africa	4	

Christopher David Rogers (born 10 October 1956) is a former South African rugby union player.

== Playing career ==
Rogers made his provincial debut for Rhodesia (now Zimbabwe) in the South African Currie Cup competition. In the 1980s he relocated to Transvaal, and in 1984 he made his debut for the Springboks against the touring England team at the Boet Erasmus Stadium in Port Elizabeth.

Rogers played in all four tests for the Springboks in 1984, the last against the South American Jaguars at Newlands in Cape Town.

=== Test history ===
No.	Opposition	Result (SA 1st)	Position	Points	Date	Venue
1.	England	33–15	Hooker		2 June 1984	Boet Erasmus, Port Elizabeth
2.	England	35–9	Hooker		9 June 1984	Ellis Park, Johannesburg
3.	South American Jaguars	32–15	Hooker		20 October 1984	Loftus Versveld, Pretoria
4.	South American Jaguars	21–13	Hooker		27 October 1984	Newlands, Cape Town

== See also ==
- List of South Africa national rugby union players – Springbok no. 534
