= Avril Williams =

South African rugby union footballer

- Born: Avril Percy Williams; 10 February 1961 (age 65) Paarl, South Africa
- Height: 1.76 m (5 ft 9 in)
- Weight: 82 kg (181 lb)
- School: Noorder Paarl Secondary School
- Notable relative: Chester Williams (nephew)

Rugby union career
- Position(s): Wing, Centre
Amateur team(s)
Years	Team	Apps	(Points)
- Cape Town Defence
Provincial / State sides
Years	Team	Apps	(Points)
1982–1984	Western Province	18	(36)
International career
Years	Team	Apps	(Points)
1984	South Africa	2	

Avril Percy Williams (born 10 February 1961 in Paarl) is a former rugby union wing who was the second coloured man (after Errol Tobias) to play for South Africa. His nephew Chester Williams later played for the Springboks too.

== Playing career ==
Williams played for Western Province in the South African provincial competitions. He gained two caps for the Springboks in June 1984, both against England. His test debut was on 2 June 1984 at the Boet Erasmus Stadium in Port Elizabeth.

=== Test history ===
No.	Opposition	Result (SA 1st)	Position	Tries	Date	Venue
1.	England	33–15	Wing		2 June 1984	Boet Erasmus Stadium, Port Elizabeth
2.	England	35–9	Wing		9 June 1984	Ellis Park Stadium, Johannesburg

== See also ==
- List of South Africa national rugby union players – Springbok no. 533
