= Chris Butcher =

English rugby union player (born 1960)

- Full name: Christopher John Simon Butcher
- Born: 19 August 1960 (age 66) Karachi, Pakistan
- School: St Peter's (Bournemouth)

Rugby union career
- Position: Flanker / No. 8
International career
Years	Team	Apps	(Points)
1984	England	3	(0)

Christopher John Simon Butcher (born 19 August 1960) is an English former rugby union international who represented England in three Test matches.

Born in Karachi, Butcher went to St Peter's Catholic School, Bournemouth and had two brothers (David and John) who were also good rugby players. He played for Middlesex at county level, club rugby for Harlequins and also appeared with several overseas clubs in countries including Australia and the United States.

Butcher received representative honours with England Schools Under 19s and the England Under-23s, before earning a spot on the 1984 England tour of South Africa. He featured in both Tests against the Springboks, playing as a number eight. Later in the year he made a further Test appearance against the touring Wallabies at Twickenham.

== See also ==
- List of England national rugby union players
