= St Peter's Catholic School, Bournemouth =

Academy in Bournemouth, Dorset, England

St Peter's Catholic School

Location
- St Catherine's Road; Bournemouth, Dorset, BH6 4AH; England; 50°43′23″N 1°47′35″W

Information
- Type: Academy
- Motto: "In Verbo Tuo" (By your word)
- Religious affiliation: Roman Catholic
- Established: 1852
- Founder: Jesuits; De La Salle Brothers
- Local authority: Bournemouth, Christchurch and Poole
- Department for Education URN: 137349 Tables
- Ofsted: Reports
- Headmaster: Ben Doyle
- Gender: Co-educational
- Age: 4 to 18
- Enrolment: 1,926
- Colour: Blue
- Website: www.st-peters.bournemouth.sch.uk

St Peter's Catholic School is a co-educational Roman Catholic school located in Bournemouth, Dorset, England. It is run under the joint trusteeship of the Roman Catholic Diocese of Portsmouth and a religious order of teachers, the De La Salle Brothers. Former headteacher David Todd joined the school in 2013 and converted the school into an academy. The current headteacher is Mr Ben Doyle.

St Peter's has achieved both drama and sports specialist school status. The nearest Catholic church is Our Lady Queen of Peace and Blessed Margaret Pole.

The Lower Primary School (Years reception –6) is on Holdenhurst Avenue, Iford; the Upper School (Years 7–13) is on St. Catherine's Road, Southbourne. The Upper School site includes the De La Salle Theatre, which seats 470 people.

== History ==
=== Jesuits ===
St Peters was founded as a private boys' boarding school in Southbourne, Bournemouth on 29 September 1936 with 34 boys by the Society of Jesus (Jesuits) as an independent boys' school, on the site of a former Girls school, Grassendale, thereafter, to be called ‘St Mary’s Gate’. The founding headmaster was Father Bellanti, former Headmaster at Stoneyhurst College, and the school was run by the Jesuits. The last Jesuit community consisted of nine fathers and two brothers. One of the Jesuit priests who was a housemaster at St Peter's was Father Gerard Hughes S.J., the author of God of Surprise in which he observed St Peter's boys were "affable and undemanding".

=== De La Salle Brothers ===
After the Second World War, in the summer of 1947, the school was handed over to the De La Salle brothers and they began a long period of development for St Peter’s as a private day and boarding school for boys in the English public school tradition. At the time of transition there were 145 boys in the school. The Catholic De La Salle brothers supported the ethos and ideals of Saint Jean-Baptiste de La Salle, the patron saint of teachers, and the founder of the Institute of the Brothers of the Christian Schools.

=== Independent Grammar School ===
From the time of the first De La Salle headmaster, Brother Bernard Brady in 1947, until 1980, under Brother Bernard Hayward, St. Peters was a fee-paying independent grammar school for day and boarding pupils, that together with Boscombe Convent School, served the Bournemouth, Christchurch, surrounding area and beyond, particularly the Catholic community, though other religious faiths were also accepted. During this time, the De La Salle brothers improved, enlarged and ran the school; thirty years later numbers had increased to nearly 800 pupils across the school from 8–18 years of age, which included 5 boarding houses for boarders. In 1973 it sent nearly 14% of its graduating Sixth Form students to Oxford and Cambridge.

Under the headmastership of Brother Alan Maurice, the school became a member of the Headmasters' and Headmistresses' Conference (HMC) association of public schools. Boaters were allowed to be worn by Sixth Form students, and boarders wore grey suits instead of the normal weekday blue on Sundays when going to Mass and Benediction. One pupil, Robert Pidgeon, was recorded in the Guinness Book of Records for passing 13 O levels at grade A in one sitting in 1975; later passing three A levels at grade A and two S levels.

Following a trend set by many independent boys' schools, and first begun by Marlborough College in 1968, girls were admitted in 1970 in small numbers, initially into the sixth form and then in subsequent year groups from 1978 onwards. Those wishing to follow a mainly science-based course of study were admitted to A Level, beginning the trend towards co-educational teaching in the school. The school did not become fully co-educational until the Autumn of 1980.

After the reorganisation of local education and the changes made by the Labour government in 1974, St Peter's, St Thomas More and Boscombe Convent schools were combined and integrated, with a notice of intent published on 13 October 1978, followed in 1980 by the merging of Boscombe Convent and St Thomas More, and all schools combined on the one site with the name of St Peter's by 1986.

=== Comprehensive ===
In 1992, the Brothers withdrew from the day-to-day running of the school, though remaining trustees, and the first headmaster who was not a member of a religious order, Anthony McCaffrey, was appointed. He retired at the end of the 2011 academic year after 19 years of leadership of St Peter's. The Boarding Houses and Dormitories were later removed or converted into classrooms, and the swimming pool was demolished due to building problems, and the area given over to serving as the school's Sixth Form Centre after a refurbishment.

=== Arts and Sports College status ===
St. Peter's School gained Arts College status in September 2000, and in September 2004 gained dual specialist status in Arts and Sport.

As an Arts College St Peter's was shortlisted, but not selected, for the 2008 Sky1 TV programme Hairspray: The School Musical, with students being interviewed and auditioned.

In 2008 St Peter's School made it to the National Theatre Connections final round, with Sixth Form student Oliver Biles directing the company.

=== Academy status ===
The school was granted Academy status at the beginning of September 2011. Martyn Egan led the school throughout its first year as an academy. David Todd became headteacher in September 2012 and resigned in August 2019, replaced in an acting capacity by Ben Doyle.

From 1 September 2014 St Peter's became an "all-through" school, with the establishment of two Reception classes at the Iford site. In September 2016, Years 7 and 8 joined the main site at Southbourne, leaving the Iford site for the sole use of the primary school.

== Headteachers ==
- 1936—1947: Father Bellanti
- 1947—1955: Brother Bernard Brady
- 1955—1959: Brother Augustine
- 1959—1965: Brother Elwin
- 1965—1966: Brother Edwin
- 1966—1974: Brother Alan Maurice
- 1974—1976: Brother Charles
- 1977—1979: Brother Bernard Hayward
- 1980—1980: Brother Ralph Sherwin
- 1980—1992: Brother Bernard Hayward
- 1992—2011: Mr Anthony McCaffery
- 2011—2012: Mr Martyn Egan
- 2012—2019: Mr David Todd
- 2019–Current: Mr Ben Doyle

== Commemoration ==
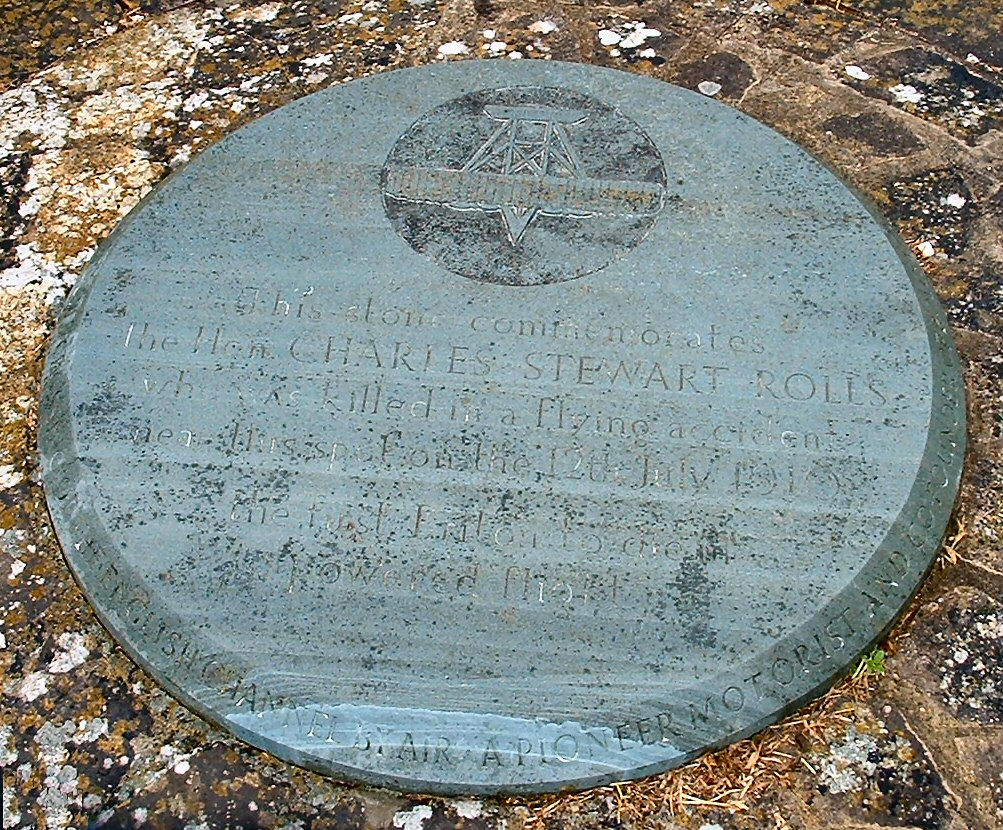
Charles Rolls memorial stone

A circular memorial to mark the motoring and aviation pioneer Charles Rolls, was unveiled in 1981 and is situated in the bottom corner of the lower playing field at the Southbourne site of St Peter's School. The school was built adjacent to Hengistbury Airfield where Rolls had a fatal accident in July 1910. A large air show was taking place as part of Bournemouth's centenary celebrations; Rolls' aeroplane crashed, the first air accident death in England.

In 2010, St Peter's marked the centenary of the death of Charles Rolls by having a fair on the Headmaster's Lawn at the Southbourne site. The memorial was also refurbished. The Central Band of the RAF performed in the school hall and there was an exhibition of Rolls-Royce aviation memorabilia, including an aero-engine.

== Notable former pupils ==
- Chris Butcher, England rugby international
- Lucy Clarke, novelist
- Chris Crilly, composer, conductor
- Jack Donnelly, actor
- Leilani Dowding, model
- Rocco Forte, hotelier
- Waldemar Januszczak, art critic and journalist
- Adam Lallana, professional footballer for England and Brighton and Hove Albion F.C.
- Andy Long, England rugby international
- Henry McGee, actor
- Geva Mentor, England netball international
- Lucy Pinder, model

Sir Andrew Pollard, COVID-19 vaccinologist and virologist

- Andrew John Scott, botanist
- Lance Secretan, author

== School productions (2010–present) ==
All Musicals performed in the school's own theatre, The De LA Salle Theatre

- 2026, Sweeney Todd: The Demon Barber of Fleet Street
- 2025, Guys & Dolls
- 2024, Chicago
- 2023, We Will Rock You, Dir. M Fox
- 2022, Footloose, Dir. M Fox
- 2020, Sweeney Todd: The Demon Barber of Fleet Street, Dir. M Fox
- 2019, West Side Story, Dir. M Fox
- 2018, Les Misérables, Dir. M Fox
- 2017, Our House: The Madness Musical, Dir. M Fox
- 2016, Joseph and The Amazing Technicolor Dreamcoat, Dir. C Hawker
- 2014, Footloose, Dir. M Fox
- 2013, Miss Saigon, Dir. M Fox
- 2012, Little Shop of Horrors, Dir. C Hawker
- 2011, Hairspray, Dir. M Fox
- 2010, Cabaret, Dir. M Fox & S Pyburn
