= John Villet =

South African rugby union footballer

- Born: John Villiers Villet; 3 November 1954 (age 72) Ceres, Western Cape, South Africa
- Height: 1.83 m (6 ft 0 in)
- Weight: 86 kg (190 lb)
- School: Bellville High School

Rugby union career
- Position: Centre
Amateur team(s)
Years	Team	Apps	(Points)
- Bellville RFC, Maties
Provincial / State sides
Years	Team	Apps	(Points)
1977–1984	Western Province	45	(40)
International career
Years	Team	Apps	(Points)
1984	South Africa	2	

John Villiers Villet (born 3 November 1954 in Ceres, Western Cape) is a former South African rugby union player.

== Playing career ==
Villet made his provincial debut for Western Province in 1977. He however, only became a regular member of the Western Province team during the 1982 season as he and centres like Peter Whipp, Willie du Plessis, Colin Beck and others, were vying for places in the team. In 1982 Villet and Du Plessis formed a more regular partnership and were they part of the successful Currie Cup winning team.

Villet made his debut for South Africa, replacing Du Plessis (who retired at the end of 1982) as Danie Gerber's centre partner, against the touring England team on 2 June 1984 at the Boet Erasmus Stadium in Port Elizabeth. He also played in the second test against the English, but then suffered a serious knee injury, effectively stopping him from playing any further test matches.

== See also ==
- List of South Africa national rugby union players – Springbok no. 532
