= Malcolm Preedy =

England international rugby union player

Malcolm Preedy (born 15 September 1960 (age 65)) is a former rugby union player, a prop who played for Gloucester and gained one cap for England v South Africa in 1984, where along with Steve Mills and Phil Blakeway he formed part of the first one club front-row to represent England.

Between 1979 and 1991 Malcolm Preedy played 313 games for Gloucester, scoring 14 tries and 1 drop goal and was captain in 1986–87. After leaving Gloucester he played for Cheltenham RFC, and in 1992 played one game for Birkenhead Park, against Gloucester at Kingsholm.
