= Peter Wheeler (rugby union) =

British Lions & England international rugby union player

- Born: Peter John Wheeler; 26 November 1948 (age 77) London, England

Rugby union career
- Position: Hooker
Senior career
Years	Team	Apps	(Points)
1969–1985	Leicester Tigers	349	
International career
Years	Team	Apps	(Points)
1975–1984	England	41	
1977, 1980	British Lions	7	

Peter John Wheeler, CBE DL (born 26 November 1948) is a former England international rugby union player who played hooker and was Chief Executive of Leicester Tigers.

== Early life ==
Wheeler attended Brockley County Grammar School and went on to play for Old Brockleians Rugby Club and Kent for three seasons.

== Playing career ==
Wheeler was considered a tough and technically proficient hooker and was integral to Leicester's innovative and expansive style of play. Wheeler captained Leicester Tigers to three consecutive wins in the John Player Cup from 1979 to 1981 and played 349 games for the club from 1969 to 1985.

He was an early advocate of league rugby in the 1980s.

He made his England debut on 1 February 1975 against France, and his last appearance on 17 March 1984 against Wales, gaining 41 caps in between, including 5 as captain.

He went on the 1977 British Lions tour to New Zealand and the 1980 British Lions tour to South Africa.

== Rugby administration ==
Wheeler coached Tigers in the inaugural league season which ended with them as champions. He then joined the Tigers organising committee.

When open professionalism was declared in 1996 he was appointed the Chief Executive of Leicester Tigers and held the position until 2010 when he was appointed "Rugby Director", though this saw little change to his day to day role. He retired in 2015 and was made a life member of Leicester, who he had served in various roles over 40 years.

Sporting positions
Preceded by John Scott	English National Rugby Union Captain; 1983–84	Succeeded by John Scott
