= Stuart Russell (rugby union) =

- Full name: Stuart Edward Russell
- Born: 29 May 1963 (age 63) Nairobi, Kenya

Rugby union career
- Position: Lock
International career
Years	Team	Apps	(Points)
1987	Wales	1	(0)

Stuart Edward Russell (born 29 May 1963) is a Welsh former rugby union international.

Russell, a Nairobi-born lock, attended Burford School in Oxfordshire and played for London Welsh.

Capped once for Wales, in a 1987 win over the United States, Russell was the first London Welsh player to debut for Wales since Clive Rees back in 1974. He moved to Bishop's Stortford in 1988, but was forced to retire from top level rugby within a year due to an eye injury, having twice suffered a detached retina.

== See also ==
- List of Wales national rugby union players
