= History of rugby union matches between England and South Africa =

The national rugby union teams of England and South Africa (the Springboks) have been playing each other in Test rugby since 1906, and by October 2023 had met in 46 Test matches. South Africa lead the series by 28 wins to 16, with 2 matches drawn. Their first meeting was on 8 December 1906, as part of South Africa's first tour of Europe, with the match ending in a 3–3 draw. The most recent meeting between the two teams was in the 2023 Rugby World Cup, on 21 October 2023, which South Africa won 16–15. The two highest-profile matches between the sides were the 2007 and the 2019 Rugby World Cup finals, both of which were won by South Africa.

== Summary ==
=== Overall ===
Details	Played	Won by England	Won by South Africa	Drawn	England points	South Africa points
In England	25	11	13	1	436	431
In South Africa	17	4	12	1	310	482
Neutral venue	6	1	5	0	79	149
Overall	48	16	30	2	825	1,062

=== Records ===
Note: Date shown in brackets indicates when the record was last set.

Record	England	South Africa
Longest winning streak	7 (24 June 2000 – 18 November 2006)	9 (25 November 2006 – 16 June 2012)
Largest points for
Home	53 (23 November 2002)	58 (26 May 2007)
Away	39 (9 June 2018)	44 (24 October 1999)
Largest winning margin
Home	50 (23 November 2002)	48 (26 May 2007)
Away	19 (18 October 2003)	36 (14 September 2007; 22 November 2008)
Largest aggregate score
81 (South Africa 42–39 England) (9 June 2018)

== Results ==
No.	Date	Venue	Score	Winner	Competition
1	8 December 1906	Crystal Palace, London	3–3	draw	1906–07 South Africa rugby union tour of Europe
2	4 January 1913	Twickenham Stadium, London	3–9	South Africa	1912–13 South Africa rugby union tour of Europe
3	2 January 1932	Twickenham Stadium, London	0–7	South Africa	1931–32 South Africa rugby union tour of Britain and Ireland
4	5 January 1952	Twickenham Stadium, London	3–8	South Africa	1951–52 South Africa rugby union tour of Europe
5	7 January 1961	Twickenham Stadium, London	0–5	South Africa	1960–61 South Africa rugby union tour of Europe
6	20 December 1969	Twickenham Stadium, London	11–8	England	1969–70 South Africa rugby union tour of Britain and Ireland
7	3 June 1972	Ellis Park Stadium, Johannesburg	9–18	England	1972 England rugby union tour of South Africa
8	2 June 1984	Boet Erasmus Stadium, Port Elizabeth	33–15	South Africa	1984 England rugby union tour of South Africa
9	9 June 1984	Ellis Park Stadium, Johannesburg	35–9	South Africa	1984 England rugby union tour of South Africa
10	14 November 1992	Twickenham Stadium, London	33–16	England	1992 South Africa rugby union tour of France and England
11	4 June 1994	Loftus Versfeld Stadium, Pretoria	15–32	England	1994 England rugby union tour of South Africa
12	11 June 1994	Newlands Stadium, Cape Town	27–9	South Africa	1994 England rugby union tour of South Africa
13	18 November 1995	Twickenham Stadium, London	14–24	South Africa	1995 South Africa tour of England and Italy
14	29 November 1997	Twickenham Stadium, London	11–29	South Africa	1997 South Africa rugby union tour of Europe
15	4 July 1998	Newlands Stadium, Cape Town	18–0	South Africa	1998 England rugby union tour of Australasia and South Africa
16	5 December 1998	Twickenham Stadium, London	13–7	England	1998 South Africa rugby union tour of Britain and Ireland
17	24 October 1999	Stade de France, Saint-Denis (France)	21–44	South Africa	1999 Rugby World Cup
18	17 June 2000	Loftus Versfeld Stadium, Pretoria	18–13	South Africa	2000 England rugby union tour of South Africa
19	24 June 2000	Free State Stadium, Bloemfontein	22–27	England	2000 England rugby union tour of South Africa
20	2 December 2000	Twickenham Stadium, London	25–17	England	2000 end-of-year rugby union internationals
21	24 November 2001	Twickenham Stadium, London	29–9	England	2001 Autumn International
22	23 November 2002	Twickenham Stadium, London	53–3	England	2002 end-of-year rugby union internationals
23	18 October 2003	Subiaco Oval, Perth (Australia)	25–6	England	2003 Rugby World Cup
24	20 November 2004	Twickenham Stadium, London	32–16	England	2004 Autumn International
25	18 November 2006	Twickenham Stadium, London	23–21	England	2006 South Africa rugby union tour of Ireland and England
26	25 November 2006	Twickenham Stadium, London	14–25	South Africa	2006 South Africa rugby union tour of Ireland and England
27	26 May 2007	Free State Stadium, Bloemfontein	58–10	South Africa	2007 England rugby union tour of South Africa
28	2 June 2007	Loftus Versfeld Stadium, Pretoria	55–22	South Africa	2007 England rugby union tour of South Africa
29	14 September 2007	Stade de France, Saint-Denis (France)	0–36	South Africa	2007 Rugby World Cup
30	20 October 2007	Stade de France, Saint-Denis (France)	6–15	South Africa	2007 Rugby World Cup
31	22 November 2008	Twickenham Stadium, London	6–42	South Africa	2008 end-of-year rugby union internationals
32	27 November 2010	Twickenham Stadium, London	11–21	South Africa	2010 end-of-year rugby union internationals
33	9 June 2012	Kings Park Stadium, Durban	22–17	South Africa	2012 England rugby union tour of South Africa
34	16 June 2012	Ellis Park Stadium, Johannesburg	36–27	South Africa	2012 England rugby union tour of South Africa
35	23 June 2012	Nelson Mandela Bay Stadium, Port Elizabeth	14–14	draw	2012 England rugby union tour of South Africa
36	24 November 2012	Twickenham Stadium, London	15–16	South Africa	2012 end-of-year rugby union internationals
37	15 November 2014	Twickenham Stadium, London	28–31	South Africa	2014 end-of-year rugby union internationals
38	12 November 2016	Twickenham Stadium, London	37–21	England	2016 end-of-year rugby union internationals
39	9 June 2018	Ellis Park Stadium, Johannesburg	42–39	South Africa	2018 England rugby union tour of South Africa
40	16 June 2018	Free State Stadium, Bloemfontein	23–12	South Africa	2018 England rugby union tour of South Africa
41	23 June 2018	Newlands Stadium, Cape Town	10–25	England	2018 England rugby union tour of South Africa
42	3 November 2018	Twickenham Stadium, London	12–11	England	2018 end-of-year rugby union internationals
43	2 November 2019	International Stadium, Yokohama (Japan)	12–32	South Africa	2019 Rugby World Cup
44	20 November 2021	Twickenham Stadium, London	27–26	England	2021 end-of-year rugby union internationals
45	26 November 2022	Twickenham Stadium, London	13–27	South Africa	2022 end-of-year rugby union internationals
46	21 October 2023	Stade de France, Saint-Denis (France)	15–16	South Africa	2023 Rugby World Cup
47	16 November 2024	Twickenham Stadium, London	20–29	South Africa	2024 end-of-year rugby union internationals
48	4 July 2026	Ellis Park Stadium, Johannesburg	45–21	South Africa	2026 Nations Championship

== List of series ==
Played	Won by England	Won by South Africa	Drawn
7	0	4	3

Year	England	South Africa	Series winner
1984	0	2	South Africa
1994	1	1	draw
2000	1	1	draw
2006	1	1	draw
2007	0	2	South Africa
2012	0	2	South Africa
2018	1	2	South Africa

== Statistical breakdown ==
As of 16 November 2024.

=== List of try-scorers ===
Pos.	Scorer	Tries
1	Bryan Habana	6
2	Danie Gerber	4
2	Will Greenwood	4
2	JP Pietersen	4
2	Joost van der Westhuizen	4
6	Cheslin Kolbe	3
6	Willem Alberts	3
6	Schalk Burger	3
6	Mark Cueto	3
6	Sbu Nkosi	3
10	9 players	2

=== List of point-scorers ===
Pos.	Scorer	Points
1	Jonny Wilkinson	124
2	Percy Montgomery	99
3	Owen Farrell	94
4	Handré Pollard	73
5	Braam van Straaten	56
6	Morné Steyn	53
7	Rob Andrew	36
7	Patrick Lambie	36
9	Jannie de Beer	34
10	Charlie Hodgson	33
