= Steve Smith (rugby union, born 1951) =

England international rugby union player

- Born: Stephen James Smith; 22 July 1951 (age 75) Stockport, England
- University: Loughborough University
- Occupation: businessman

Rugby union career
- Position: Scrumhalf
Amateur team(s)
Years	Team	Apps	(Points)
- Loughborough Colleges
–	Sale		
International career
Years	Team	Apps	(Points)
1973-83	England	28	(8)

Stephen James Smith (born 22 July 1951) is a former England international rugby union footballer and was educated at The King's School, Macclesfield. In 1980 he played in all four matches in England's Grand Slam victory and was called up as a replacement to the 1980 British Lions tour to South Africa but did not play a game; he sat on the bench for the final international. He became a fully-fledged Lion on the 1983 British Lions tour to New Zealand when joining the tour as a replacement for the injured Nigel Melville. He played club rugby for Sale and was on the winning team at the Glengarth Sevens whilst playing for Loughborough University.

In 1987 he founded the Cotton Traders clothing business with his former club and national teammate Fran Cotton. In 2008 Cotton Traders was forced to pull out of Burma after an investigation by the Burma Campaign UK uncovered the company was sourcing clothing from Burma.

Steve Smith was employed by ITV as a co-commentator with John Taylor of the Rugby World Cup, from 1991 to 2003. He was co-commentator to Taylor when England won the World Cup Final in 2003.

Sporting positions
Preceded by Bill Beaumont	English National Rugby Union Captain; 1982-83	Succeeded by John Scott
