= Mike Teague =

England and Lions rugby union player

- Born: Michael Clive Teague; 8 October 1959 (age 67) Gloucester, England
- Height: 1.90 m (6 ft 3 in)
- Weight: 106 kg (16 st 10 lb)
- School: Churchdown School

Rugby union career
- Position: Flanker/Number eight
Amateur team(s)
Years	Team	Apps	(Points)
- Moseley
–	Cardiff		
–	Stroud		
Senior career
Years	Team	Apps	(Points)
1978-1995	Gloucester	306	(312)
International career
Years	Team	Apps	(Points)
1985–1993	England	27	(12)
1989, 1993	British Lions	3	(0)

Michael Clive Teague (born 8 October 1960) is an English former rugby union player who played for the British Lions on two tours.

== Early life ==
Teague was born and raised on a farm a few miles outside Gloucester. He attended Churchdown School.

== Club career ==
Teague spent his youth in The Shed watching Gloucester. After cutting his teeth with the local All Blues club, Teague joined the Cherry and Whites during the 1978–79 season aged 18 making 4 appearances, his debut coming at Kingsholm against Exeter University on 15 November 1978 in which he scored a try in a comfortable victory. He combined his rugby with his career as a fitter for the local water authority before becoming a builder in what was the amateur era, eventually setting up his own building firm with his brother-in-law. Known to Gloucester fans as 'Iron Mike' he played the majority of his club rugby for his home town club, but also had brief spells at Cardiff RFC for half a season and Stroud RFC with his close friend and Gloucester back row colleague John Gadd, before re-joining Gloucester on both occasions. During the later years of his senior rugby career he played for Moseley, before re-joining Gloucester once again to see out his playing days. Teague made a total of 291 appearances for Gloucester, winning the John Player Cup in 1982 (although they had to share the title with Moseley after a 12–12 draw in extra time – the only time the cup has ever been shared) and the John Smith's Merit Table in the 1985–1986 season. He was twice a runner up with Gloucester in National Courage League 1 (now the Premiership) in both the 1988–89 and 1989–90 seasons. He also played in the 1990 Pilkington Cup final defeat to Bath, scoring a try in both the 26–16 quarter final away win over Nottingham and the 17–12 semi final away win over Northampton that secured Gloucesters spot in the Twickenham showpiece. During the 1981–82 season he scored 21 tries, which remains the club's record for most tries scored by a forward in one season. He was sent off 3 times during his playing career, two of those red cards coming against local rivals Bath. His last game for Gloucester was against Harlequins at Kingsholm at the end of the 1994/95 season aged 34. At the start of the 1995–96 season Teague was appointed to the newly created post of team manager of the Gloucester first team.

== Gloucestershire and South West Division ==
Teague was selected to represent Gloucestershire on a number of occasions, starting on the bench against Somerset at Twickenham in the 1984 county championship final, which Gloucestershire won 36–18. Other notable games he was involved in for Gloucestershire include starting on the bench in the 1981–82 county championship semi final defeat to Lancashire at Kingsholm, starting on the bench in the 1982–83 county championship semi final victory over Surrey at the Memorial Ground, Bristol and starting at blind side flanker in the 1984–85 county championship semi final defeat to Nottinghamshire, Lincolnshire and Derbyshire at the Memorial Ground, Bristol. Teague was also selected to represent the South West Division on a number of occasions.

== International career ==
=== England ===
Teague represented England at Under 23 level before playing his first England B game in the 20–10 win over France B in November 1981, winning a place in the England trial the following month. Teague made his test debut on 2 February 1985 aged 24, in the then five nations, as a substitute for Jon Hall in a 9–9 draw against France at Twickenham. He was then selected for England's final game of the tournament against Wales but the match was called off due to icy conditions and John Hall won his place back for the re-arranged fixture. Teague made his full test début on the summer tour of New Zealand the same year, playing in both test matches. He was not selected to represent England at any level for a further three years before playing for England B against Russia in 1988, eventually re-gaining his place in the full England team in a 12–12 draw with Scotland in the 1989 five nations. In order to bulk up and regain his place in the England team he trained every day with body builders in the local gym, as well as doing 'Mad Dog' training with Gloucester. That involved hill running, often at three-quarter pace, carrying logs and rocks. It was intense and he had to find the time for daily training between his work as a builder. He went on to play in 3 matches during the 1990 five nations and was a key member of England's Grand Slam team of 1991, scoring the only try in England's 25–6 win against Wales in Cardiff on 19 January, England's first win in Cardiff for 28 years, as well as scoring against Ireland in England's victory in Dublin. In the same year he helped England reach the World Cup final, playing in five of England's six matches including the final, a narrow 12–6 defeat to Australia at Twickenham. The world cup final was his last appearance for a year; he sat out the 1992 Five Nations suffering from injury and exhaustion. However, he would reappear in England colours, playing against South Africa on their return to Twickenham after the sporting embargo had been lifted. His final England cap was against Ireland at Lansdowne Road in the 5 nations in 1993. England second row Paul Ackford christened Teague 'Iron Mike' at the time when Mike Tyson was world heavyweight champion. Teague played 27 times for his country, 19 times as blindside flanker and 8 times at number 8. He scored a total of 3 tries for England against New Zealand in Christchurch on 1 June 1985, Wales in Cardiff on 19 January 1991 and Ireland in Dublin on 2 March 1991.

Below is his international record for England:

- 1985 v France (Twickenham) D 9–9 (Five Nations)
- 1985 v New Zealand (Christchurch) L 18–13
- 1985 v New Zealand (Wellington) L 42–15
- 1989 v Scotland (Twickenham) D 12–12 (Five Nations)
- 1989 v Ireland (Dublin) W 16–3 (Five Nations)
- 1989 v France (Twickenham) W 11–0 (Five Nations)
- 1989 v Wales (Cardiff) L 12–9 (Five Nations)
- 1989 v Romania (Bucharest) W 58–3
- 1990 v France (Paris) W 26–7 (Five Nations)
- 1990 v Wales (Twickenham) W 34–6 (Five Nations)
- 1990 v Scotland (Murrayfield) L 13–7 (Five Nations)
- 1991 v Wales (Cardiff) W 25–6 (Five Nations)
- 1991 v Scotland (Twickenham) W 21–12 (Five Nations)
- 1991 v Ireland (Dublin) W 16–7 (Five Nations)
- 1991 v France (Twickenham) W 21–19 (Five Nations)
- 1991 v Fiji (Suva) W 28–12
- 1991 v Australia (Sydney) L 40–15
- 1991 v New Zealand (Twickenham) L 18–12 (World Cup)
- 1991 v Italy (Twickenham) W 36–6 (World Cup)
- 1991 v France (Paris) W 19–10 (World Cup)
- 1991 v Scotland (Murrayfield) W 9–6 (World Cup)
- 1991 v Australia (Twickenham) L 12–6 (World Cup Final)
- 1992 v South Africa (Twickenham) W 33–16
- 1993 v France (Twickenham) W 16–15 (Five Nations)
- 1993 v Wales (Cardiff) L 10–9 (Five Nations)
- 1993 v Scotland (Twickenham) W 26–12 (Five Nations)
- 1993 v Ireland (Dublin) L 17–3 (Five Nations)

=== British & Irish Lions ===
Teague was selected for the Lions tour to Australia in 1989. Teague had drifted out of the picture for England until coming back into Lions contention as an ever-present for his country in 1988–89, only for a shoulder injury to rule him out of the first test. Without the injured Mike Teague for the opening test, the Lions suffered a 30–12 defeat in Sydney, their heaviest defeat by Australia. With the England loose-forward restored to the pack for the final two matches as the blindside flanker, they became the only Lions team ever to come from 1–0 down to win a series, winning the second test in Brisbane 19–12 and the third test in Sydney 19–18. Teague was named player of the series for his dynamic and destructive displays in the second and third tests.

During the 1989 British Lions tour to Australia, Teague played a total of six games for the tourists. These games were:

- 10 June 1989 Lions v Western Australia (W 44–0)
- 17 June 1989 Lions v Queensland Reds (W 19–15)
- 24 June 1989 Lions v NSW Waratahs (W 23–21)
- 8 July 1989 Lions v Australia (W 19–12)
- 15 July 1989 Lions v Australia (W 19–18)
- 23 July 1989 Lions v Anzac XV (W 19–15)

Teague finished his international career by making a second Lions tour to New Zealand in 1993, making his last international appearance as a substitute in the Lions 20–7 victory over New Zealand in Wellington on 26 June 1993. The Lions were unbeaten in all three tests Teague played for them during his career.

During the 1993 British Lions tour to New Zealand, Teague played a total of eight games for the tourists, scoring one try against Taranaki. These games were:

- 26 May 1993 Lions v North Harbour (W 29–13)
- 29 May 1993 Lions v New Zealand Maori (W 24–20)
- 5 June 1993 Lions v Otago (L 37–24)
- 8 June 1993 Lions v Southland (W 34–16)
- 16 June 1993 Lions v Taranaki (W 49–25)
- 22 June 1993 Lions v Hawkes Bay (L 29–17)
- 26 June 1993 Lions v New Zealand (W 20–7)
- 29 June 1993 Lions v Waikato (L 38–10)

=== Barbarians ===
Teague was also selected to play for the Barbarians. He played a total of six games for the invitational side:

- 6 October 1990 Barbarians v Wales (W 31–24)
- 14 April 1990 Barbarians v Cardiff (L 22–13)
- 28 December 1988 Barbarians v Leicester (W 36–19)
- 22 October 1985 Barbarians v Newport (L 38–29)
- 8 April 1985 Barbarians v Swansea (L 21–17)
- 5 April 1985 Barbarians v Penarth (W 48–14)

=== World XV ===
In 1989 Teague toured South Africa with a World XV. He started in the first of two IRB sanctioned tests played against South Africa to celebrate the centenary of the South African Rugby Board (SARB), a 20–19 defeat for the tourists at Newlands on 26 August 1989.

== Test career statistics ==
	Span	Match	Start	Sub	Points	Tries	Won	Lost	Draw	%
All Tests	1985–1993	30	28	2	12	3	19	9	2	66.6
England	1985–1993	27	26	1	12	3	16	9	2	62.96
British Lions	1989–1993	3	2	1	0	0	3	0	0	100.00
Rugby World Cup	1991	5	5	0	0	0	3	2	0	60.00
Five/Six Nations	1985–1993	16	15	1	8	2	10	4	2	68.75

== Personal life ==
Teague married his long-term fiancée Lorraine in August 1989 after the British Lions tour to Australia, with his Gloucester back row colleague John Gadd as his best man. Teague has two children: a son, Alexander, and a daughter, Melissa. Teague also enjoys motorbike scrambling.
