= John Fidler (rugby union) =

England international rugby union player

- Full name: John Howard Fidler
- Born: 16 September 1948 (age 78) Cheltenham, England
- Height: 6 ft 4 in (193 cm)

Rugby union career
- Position: Lock
Senior career
Years	Team	Apps	(Points)
1972-1984	Gloucester RFC	288	(32)
International career
Years	Team	Apps	(Points)
1981–84	England	4	(0)

John Howard Fidler (born 16 September 1948) is an English former rugby union international who represented England in four Test matches. His son Rob Fidler also represented England.

A Cheltenham Colts product, Fidler was a regular fixture in the second row for Gloucester and won five county championships with Gloucestershire. He was a policeman by profession.

Fidler's England caps didn't come until he was in his 30s, making his debut in the 1981 tour of Argentina. He also played Tests for England in the 1984 tour of South Africa, after which he announced his retirement.

== See also ==
- List of England national rugby union players
