= Mark Bailey (rugby union) =

English academic and rugby union player

Mark Bailey FRHistS
- Born: 21 November 1960 (age 65); Castleford, Yorkshire, England

Academic background
- Education: Durham University; Corpus Christi College, Cambridge
- Thesis: At the margin: Suffolk Breckland in the Middle Ages (1987)

Academic work
- Discipline: Historian
- Sub-discipline: Economic history; cultural history; Medieval England; Economy of England in the Middle Ages
- Institutions: Gonville and Caius College, Cambridge; Board of Continuing Education, University of Cambridge; Corpus Christi College, Cambridge; Leeds Grammar School; University of East Anglia; St Paul's School, London

Mark David Bailey, FRHistS (born 21 November 1960) is a British academic, headteacher and former rugby union player. Since 2020, he has been Professor of Late Medieval History at the University of East Anglia. In 2019, he delivered the James Ford Lectures in British History at Oxford University, which were later published as a book, After the Black Death: Economy, society, and the law in fourteenth-century England.

Bailey played rugby union for Cambridge University R.U.F.C., Bedford Blues, London Wasps, and for England. He completed a doctorate at Cambridge during his playing career, and was then elected a fellow at Gonville and Caius College, Cambridge in 1986 and then at Corpus Christi College, Cambridge in 1996. He left academia in 1999 to become headmaster of Leeds Grammar School before returning in 2010 when he was appointed Professor of Later Medieval History at the University of East Anglia (UEA). He left that post after a year to become High Master of St Paul's School, London, while maintaining a visiting professorship at UEA. He has once again been Professor of Late Medieval History at UEA since 2020.

== Early life ==
Bailey was born on 21 November 1960 in Castleford, Yorkshire. He was educated at Love Lane Primary School, Pontefract, Dale Hall Primary School, Ipswich, Ipswich School and Durham University, graduating with a Bachelor of Arts degree in economic history in 1982. He completed his doctoral studies at Corpus Christi College, Cambridge. His PhD was awarded in 1987 for his thesis, "At the margin: Suffolk Breckland in the Middle Ages".

== Sporting career ==
In 1979, Bailey won the Cricket Society's Wetherell Award for the best public school all-rounder. In 1980, he played for the NCA Young Cricketers and made his debut in the Minor Counties for Suffolk, for whom he played until 1991 and served as captain between 1988 and 1990.

Bailey played rugby for Durham University and the University of Cambridge, captaining the latter in the 1983 and 1984 Varsity matches. He won four Blues at Cambridge. He later served as secretary of Cambridge University R.U.F.C. as its representative on the Rugby Football Union, and was president of the club. Bailey played on the wing for Bedford in 1981–2 and for London Wasps between 1984 and 1990, winning the premiership in the 1989–90 season. Bailey was a captain of the England B national team. He also received international honours for England, and played seven times. He made his international debut in a 1984 series against South Africa, and later played for England at the 1987 Rugby World Cup, and in the 1990 Five Nations Championship. He also played for the Barbarians invitational side.

After retiring, Bailey became a member of the Rugby Football Union's playing committee. On 16 June 2003, Bailey was honoured with Durham University's Palatinate Award for Sport.

== Academic career ==
Bailey was elected to a fellowship at Gonville and Caius College, Cambridge in 1986. He was additionally a lecturer in local history at the Board of Continuing Education, University of Cambridge in 1991. In 1996, he left both positions and became a fellow at Corpus Christi College, Cambridge. In 1999, he was appointed headmaster of Leeds Grammar School, an all-boys independent school in Leeds, West Yorkshire. He was also elected a Fellow of the Royal Historical Society (FRHistS) the same year.

In 2010 Bailey left Leeds to spend one term as a visiting fellow in medieval history at All Souls College, Oxford. He then took up the post of Professor of Later Medieval History at the University of East Anglia (UEA) that year. In 2011, however, he succeeded Martin Stephen as high master of St Paul's School, London, a role he held until June 2020. During this time, he maintained a link with UEA as a visiting professor. In 2020, he was succeeded as high master by Sally-Anne Huang, and he returned to the University of East Anglia.

He has written seven books and published a number of academic articles on the economy and society of medieval England. In 2014 he published The Decline of Serfdom in late medieval England: from bondage to freedom. Bailey was invited to deliver the Ford Lectures in British History at the University of Oxford in 2019; these were published in 2021 by Oxford University Press as After the Black Death: Economy, society, and the law in fourteenth-century England. In 2025, he published Serfdom in England: Theory and Practice 1200 to 1500 , which won the Joan Thirsk Memorial Prize for the best book in British and Irish Agricultural History in 2025.

== Bibliography ==
- A Marginal Economy?: East Anglian Breckland in the later Middle Ages (Cambridge University Press, 1989).
- (Editor) The Bailiffs’ Minute Book of Dunwich 1404–1430 (Boydell Press, 1992).
- (Co-authored with John Hatcher) Modelling the Middle Ages: The History and Theory of England’s Economic Development (Oxford University Press, 2001).
- The English Manor c. 1200–1500 (Manchester University Press, 2002).
- Medieval Suffolk: An Economic and Social History 1200–1500 (Boydell Press, 2007).
- (Co-edited with Carole Rawcliffe, and Maureen Jurkowski) Poverty and Wealth: Sheep, Taxation and Charity in Medieval Norfolk (Norfolk Record Society, 2007).
- (Co-authored with S. H. Rigby) Town and Countryside in the Age of the Black Death: Essays in Honour of John Hatcher (Brepols, 2012).
- The Decline of Serfdom in Late Medieval England (Boydell Press, 2014).
- After the Black Death: Economy, society, and the law in fourteenth-century England (Oxford University Press, 2021)
