= Nick Stringer (rugby union) =

England international rugby union player

Nicholas Courtenay Stringer (born 4 October 1960) is a former international rugby union player, a full back, who gained 5 caps for England between 1982 and 1985. He played with the London Wasps.
