= Simon Halliday =

English cricketer and rugby union footballer

- Born: Simon John Halliday; 13 July 1960 (age 66) Haverfordwest, Wales
- Height: 6 ft 0 in (1.83 m)
- Weight: 13 st 10 lb (87 kg)

Rugby union career
- Position(s): Centre, Wing
Senior career
Years	Team	Apps	(Points)
1981-1990	Bath	170	(260)
1990-1992	Harlequins		
International career
Years	Team	Apps	(Points)
1986-1992	England	23	(8)

Simon John Halliday (born 13 July 1960 in Haverfordwest, Pembrokeshire, Wales) is a former English rugby union international. He also played nine first-class cricket matches. He was educated at Downside School, Somerset and St Benet's Hall, Oxford.

== Cricket ==
Halliday's first-class cricket appearances were with Oxford University from 1980 to 1982 and in all he made 348 first-class runs at 29.00 but passed 50 only once in his 14 innings. This was when he scored 113 not out against Kent in 1982, with a bowling lineup consisting of English Test cricketers Graham Dilley and Bob Woolmer. He also played cricket for Dorset from 1981 to 1987, including 38 Minor Counties Championship matches and 3 one-day matches in the National Westminster Bank Trophy.

== Rugby Union ==
Halliday also played rugby union for Oxford University from 1979 to 1981, including 3 Varsity matches. He went on to play for Bath Rugby Club. His sporting career was interrupted by a serious leg injury when playing for Somerset against Middlesex in the Rugby Union County Championship in 1983. He recovered to work his way into the England national team and made his debut in the 1986 Five Nations. He soon formed what seemed initially to be a stable and lasting centre partnership with Will Carling, only to be dropped to the bench during 1989-90 thanks to the emergence of Jeremy Guscott as Carling's centre partner (since Carling, as captain, was guaranteed his own place in the side). England's selectors nevertheless attempted to fit Halliday into the side by playing him on the wing with Carling and Guscott at centre, but in the 1990 Five Nations campaign this move met with only mixed success in two matches - the victory over Wales followed by a defeat in the Grand Slam decider, against Scotland. He did not play in the 1991 Five Nations, but was however a part of England's 1991 Rugby World Cup campaign, initially in the squad as a utility-back squad member, playing a group match against USA: then playing in the Semi Final win over Scotland, and the Final which they lost to Australia. In these two matches he was once again played on the right wing, selected ahead of the actual specialist winger Nigel Heslop: the latter believed to be still somewhat fragile after taking a pounding in the brutal quarter-final against France, and the other winger in the squad (Chris Oti) being injury-prone. The move was regarded as enough of a success for Halliday to be retained on the wing as first choice for the next year, in the England side which won the 1992 Five Nations Championship with a Grand Slam. He played in 23 internationals from 1986 to 1992, retiring after the 1992 grand slam: his two international tries came in the 1988 autumn victory over Australia (partnering Carling at centre, in the latter's first match as captain) and the 1992 Five Nations victory over Ireland (playing on the wing).

From 1981 to 1990, Halliday made a total of 170 appearances for Bath, including five successful Cup Finals. In 1990 he moved to Harlequins before retiring in 1992 because of long-term injuries.

== Author ==
Halliday published the book City Centre in 2013, a book about rugby. It won the 2014 British Sports Book Awards in the "Rugby" category.
