= Nigel Melville =

England international rugby union player

- Born: Nigel David Melville; 6 January 1961 (age 65) Leeds, Yorkshire
- Height: 1.78 m (5 ft 10 in)
- Weight: 76 kg (12 st 0 lb; 168 lb)

Rugby union career
- Position: Scrum-half
Senior career
Years	Team	Apps	(Points)
- Otley R.U.F.C.
- Wakefield RFC
1981–1988	Wasps FC		
International career
Years	Team	Apps	(Points)
1984–1988	England	13	(0)
Coaching career
- Years: Team
- Otley R.U.F.C.
- London Wasps
- 1996–2005: Gloucester Rugby

Nigel David Melville (born 6 January 1961) is a former England national rugby union team scrum half and captain and currently serves as Director of Professional Rugby for the Rugby Football Union.

Melville became the youngest player to captain England on his début when he led them against Australia in November 1984. He went on to make another twelve appearances over the next four years.

== Playing career ==
Melville attended Aireborough Grammar School and North East London polytechnic. He played club rugby for Otley R.U.F.C., Wakefield RFC and Wasps FC.

Melville was captain of the England Schools 19 age group on their tour to New Zealand and Australia in 1979, England B – the youngest captain at the time, England Under 23 on their tour of Romania in 1983.

Melville earned 13 caps for England. He captained the full England side seven times, winning four games. Melville toured with England to Argentina in 1981, North America in 1982 and New Zealand in 1985. Melville was a replacement for the injured Terry Holmes on the British Lions tour to New Zealand in 1983 but picked up a spinal injury in his second game and took no further part on the tour.

Melville's career was blighted by a number of serious injuries including a serious neck injury, shoulder damage, five knee operations and a chipped ankle. These partly restricted the number of matches he played for England.

== Coaching and management ==
During his playing career, Melville was the Head of UK Promotions for Nike working alongside elite athletes from a wide range of sports.

On retirement, Melville entered coaching and as Director of Rugby at London Wasps, Melville coached the team to their first professional Premiership title in 1996, followed by three National Cup Final appearances, winning two. In March 2002 he moved to Gloucester Rugby, winning the Zurich Championship Final (the year before winning the play-offs constituted winning the English title), Powergen Cup and topped the Zurich Premiership table by a record 15 clear points. He left in 2005.

Melville was appointed CEO and President of Rugby Operations for USA Rugby on 11 October 2006. At the time his Roberts' appointment, USA Rugby had 80,000 registered players in the U.S. One of the goals that USA Rugby chairman Kevin Roberts set for Melville in 2006 was for the U.S. national team to reach the 2011 Rugby World Cup quarterfinals. Under Melville's tenure, USA Rugby began its "rookie rugby" program, exposing young people to the sport of rugby. Melville predicted in 2012 that professional rugby would come to the United States by 2015. He stepped down from his position with USA Rugby effective 30 June 2016.

Melville started as Director of Professional Rugby for England's Rugby Football Union in July 2016.

Sporting positions
Preceded by John Scott; Paul Dodge; Mike Harrison	English National Rugby Union Captain; Nov 1984; 1986; Mar 1988	Succeeded by Paul Dodge; Richard Hill; John Orwin
