= John Palmer (rugby union) =

England international rugby union player

- Full name: John Anthony Palmer
- Born: 13 February 1957 (age 69) Malta
- School: Prior Park College, Bath

Rugby union career
- Position: Centre
International career
Years	Team	Apps	(Points)
1984–86	England	3	(0)

John Anthony Palmer (born 13 February 1957) is an English former rugby union international who represented England in three Test matches between 1984 and 1986.

Palmer, born in Malta, studied at Prior Park College in Bath, Somerset.

An England Under-23s representative, Palmer earned an England call up for the 1984 tour of South Africa and featured as a centre in both Tests against the Springboks. He also played in a Five Nations Test against Ireland at Twickenham in 1986, coming on as a substitute, but would announce his retirement from international rugby later that year aged 29.

Palmer captained Bath to the 1985–86 John Player Cup title.

== See also ==
- List of England national rugby union players
