= Phil Blakeway =

English rugby union player

- Born: Phillip John Blakeway; 31 December 1950 (age 75) Cheltenham, Gloucestershire
- Height: 5 ft 11 in (1.80 m)
- Weight: 16 st 0 lb (102 kg)

Rugby union career
- Position: Prop
Senior career
Years	Team	Apps	(Points)
1971–1985	Gloucester RFC	140	(16)
International career
Years	Team	Apps	(Points)
1980–1985	England	19	(0)
1980	British and Irish Lions	0	(0)

Phillip John Blakeway (born 31 December 1950) is a former England international rugby union player who played for Gloucester. He was normally a tighthead prop but also turned out at loosehead Blakeway broke his neck in 1977 but went on to represent his country 19 times. After being part of England's Grand Slam in 1980, including a first win in Paris since 1964, the prop toured South Africa in 1980 with the British Lions but was forced to return home early due to a rib injury sustained in the Five Nations Championship.
