= John Scott (rugby union, born 1954) =

England international rugby union footballer

- Born: John Philip Scott; 28 September 1954 (age 72) Exeter, Devon, England
- School: Hele's
- Occupation: Company director

Rugby union career
- Position: No. 8
Senior career
Years	Team	Apps	(Points)
1978-1988	Cardiff RFC	268	(144)
International career
Years	Team	Apps	(Points)
1978–1984	England	34	(4)
1980	World XV	1	(4)

John Scott (born 28 September 1954) is a former rugby union international who represented England from 1978 to 1984.

== Rugby career ==
=== International record ===
Debut: 21 January 1978 –v- France (Paris) lost 15–6 (FN) (Aged: 23)

Final appearance: 9 June 1984 –v- South Africa (Johannesburg) lost 35–9 (Aged: 28)

Career Record: P34, W13, D3, L18. Points: 4 (1 Try)

English Caps 1978–84

- 1978 France (Paris) L 15 – 6
- 1978 Wales (Twickenham) L 9 – 6
- 1978 Scotland (Murrayfield) W 15 – 0
- 1978 Ireland (Twickenham) W 15 – 9
- 1978 New Zealand (Twickenham) L 16 – 6
- 1979 Scotland (R) (Twickenham) D 7 – 7
- 1979 Ireland (Dublin) L 12 – 7
- 1979 France (Twickenham) W 7 – 6
- 1979 Wales (Cardiff) L 27 – 3
- 1979 New Zealand (Twickenham) L 10 – 9
- 1980 Ireland (Twickenham) W 24 – 9
- 1980 France (Paris) W 17 – 13
- 1980 Wales (Twickenham) W 9 – 8
- 1980 Scotland (Murrayfield) W 30 – 18
- 1981 Wales (Cardiff) L 21 – 19
- 1981 Scotland (Twickenham) W 23 – 17
- 1981 Ireland (Dublin) W 10 – 6
- 1981 France (Twickenham) L 16 – 12
- 1981 Argentina (Buenos Aires) D 19 – 19
- 1981 Argentina (Buenos Aires) W 12 – 6
- 1982 Ireland (Twickenham) L 16 – 15
- 1982 France (Paris) W 27 – 15
- 1982 Wales (Twickenham) W 17 – 7
- 1983 France (Twickenham) L 19 – 15
- 1983 Wales (Cardiff) D 13 – 13
- 1983 Scotland (Twickenham) L 22 – 12
- 1983 Ireland (Dublin) L 25 – 15
- 1983 New Zealand (Twickenham) W 15 – 9
- 1984 Scotland (Murrayfield) L 18 – 6
- 1984 Ireland (Twickenham) W 12 – 9
- 1984 France (Paris) L 32 – 18
- 1984 Wales (Twickenham) L 24 – 15
- 1984 South Africa (Port Elizabeth) L 33 – 15
- 1984 South Africa (Johannesburg) L 35 – 9

(R) = Replacement

Scott also played for the World XV against Argentina in Buenos Aires, scoring a try in a 36 - 22 loss.

== Family and later life ==
Married to Oonagh, they have two children, Liam and Gemma. Scott is currently director of an embroidery company in Bessemer Road, Cardiff.

Sporting positions
Preceded by Steve Smith; Peter Wheeler	England national rugby union team captain Mar 1983; Jun 1984	Succeeded by Peter Wheeler; Nigel Melville
