= Jeremy Guscott =

British Lions & England international rugby union player

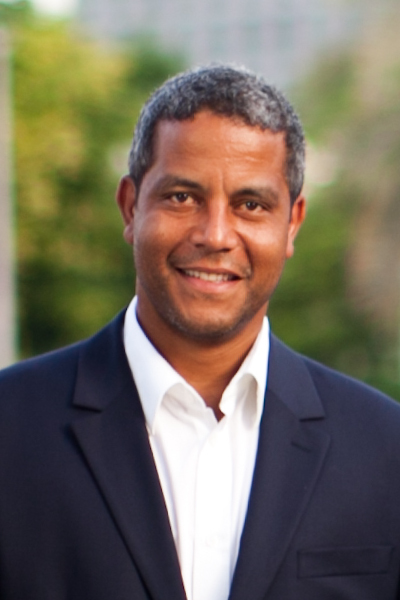
- Jeremy Guscott in 2012
- Born: Jeremy Clayton Guscott; 7 July 1965 (age 61) Bath, Somerset, England
- Height: 6 ft 1 in (1.85 m)
- Weight: 13 st 3 lb (84 kg)
- School: Ralph Allen School
- Occupation: Television pundit

Rugby union career
- Position: Centre
Senior career
Years	Team	Apps	(Points)
1984–2000	Bath	266	(710)
International career
Years	Team	Apps	(Points)
1989–1999	England	65	(143)
1989, 1993, 1997	British Lions	8	(7)
Medal record
Men's Rugby 15's
Representing England
Rugby World Cup
Silver medal – second place	1991 England	Squad

Jeremy Clayton Guscott (born 7 July 1965) is an English former rugby union player who played for Bath, England and the British Lions. Usually an outside centre, he also appeared for England on the wing.

On 17 November 2016, Guscott was inducted to the World Rugby Hall of Fame during the opening ceremonies for the Hall's first physical location in Rugby, Warwickshire.

== Early life ==
Guscott was born in Bath, Somerset, one of the two sons of Jamaican hospital porter Henry Guscott and his English wife Sue. He was educated at Ralph Allen School. He played for Bath, his home city, throughout his career, most of which was during the amateur era. Guscott was originally a bricklayer, briefly drove buses for Badgerline in Bath, and worked for British Gas in a public-relations role before the game turned professional.

== Rugby career ==
At club level Guscott played for Bath from 1984 to 2000, scoring 710 points in 266 appearances. He also started for Bath in the victorious 1998 Heineken Cup Final as they defeated Brive.

During the English off season in 1987, Guscott travelled to Australia and played for Wollongong Waratahs RFC in the Illawarra District Rugby Union competition.

Marking his England debut with a hat-trick of tries in the 58–3 win over Romania in Bucharest in May 1989, Guscott received a call-up for the in-progress British Lions tour of Australia, making a series-winning contribution in the second and third Tests. He also travelled to New Zealand in 1993 with the Lions, playing in all three Tests; though in this tour the Lions lost 2 matches to 1.

When Will Carling stepped down as England captain in 1996, Phil de Glanville was appointed his successor. As de Glanville was thereby guaranteed a place in the team, Carling was moved from inside centre to outside centre and Guscott was relegated to the bench. Such was Guscott's talent and form at the time that even Carling noted in his autobiography that it was an extraordinary decision for then England Coach, Jack Rowell, to make. In the 1997 Five Nations, Guscott came off the bench to play on the wing in wins against Ireland and Wales.

Guscott toured with the British Lions in South Africa in 1997, where he scored the winning drop goal during the decisive second test. He started the third and final test in this series but broke his arm and could not finish the game.

His last game for England was against Tonga in a 1999 Rugby World Cup pool match at Twickenham, scoring a length-of-field try and receiving a standing ovation upon the game's conclusion. An increasingly debilitating thigh injury forced Guscott to call time on his career and take an early exit from 1999 World Cup competition. England lost to South Africa, without him, in the quarter final. In all, Guscott represented England in three World Cups – 1991, 1995, and 1999 – helping England to an appearance in the 1991 final. He missed most of the 1994 international season through injury.

Guscott now works for the BBC as a pundit on their rugby programmes.

== Personal life ==
Guscott is married to Saz, who is a psychologist. He has 3 daughters, Imogen, Holly and Saskia, from his previous marriage.

== See also ==
- List of top English points scorers and try scorers

== Bibliography ==
- At the centre – autobiography ISBN 1-85793-084-3
