= Dusty Hare =

British Lions & England international rugby union player

- Born: William Henry Hare; 29 November 1952 (age 73); Newark-on-Trent, Nottinghamshire, England

Rugby union career
- Position: Fullback
Senior career
Years	Team	Apps	(Points)
1971–1976	Nottingham R.F.C.	176	(1,578)
1976–1989	Leicester Tigers	394	(4,507)
International career
Years	Team	Apps	(Points)
1974–1984	England	25	(240)
1983	British Lions		
- Cricket career

Cricket information
- Batting: Right-handed
- Bowling: Right-arm medium

Domestic team information
- Years: Team
- 1971–1977: Nottinghamshire
- FC debut: 30 June 1971 Nottinghamshire v Oxford University
- Last FC: 25 May 1977 Nottinghamshire v Essex
- LA debut: 20 August 1972 Nottinghamshire v Northamptonshire
- Last LA: 25 June 1975 Nottinghamshire v Sussex

Career statistics
Competition	First-class	List A
Matches	10	7
Runs scored	171	58
Batting average	12.21	11.6
100s/50s	0/0	0/0
Top score	36	24
Balls bowled	24	–
Wickets	0	–
Bowling average	–	–
5 wickets in innings	–	–
10 wickets in match	–	–
Best bowling	–	–
Catches/stumpings	5/0	3/1
- Source: CricketArchive, 4 December 2008

William Henry "Dusty" Hare MBE (born 29 November 1952) is a former international England rugby union footballer who played fullback.

Hare holds the world record for points scored in a first-class rugby career, with 7,337 points.

He was born in Newark-on-Trent, Nottinghamshire and attended the Magnus Grammar School (now Magnus Church of England School).

== Rugby career ==
Hare played for Newark RUFC & Nottingham R.F.C. before joining Leicester Tigers and playing nearly 400 games for them.

He made his England debut 16 March 1974 in a match against Wales, and played his final game ten years later on, having gained 25 caps. He toured with the British Lions to New Zealand in 1983.

He retired from club rugby after the 1989 cup final loss to Bath, and is now the chief scout at Northampton Saints. Previous to this job, Hare was a farmer in South Clifton, Nottinghamshire and had been since a young man carrying on the family business. However, Hare sold the farm in 2001 to take a full-time job at Leicester Tigers working for the academy and latterly as head scout.

In January 2010 it was announced that he was to join Northampton Saints. He returned to Tigers in 2017

== Cricket career ==
Hare was also a good cricketer, and he played ten first-class and seven List A matches for Nottinghamshire between 1971 and 1977. He played regularly for the Nottinghamshire Second XI and Under-25s between 1969 and 1978.

== See also ==
- List of top English points scorers and try scorers
