= Steve Mills (rugby union) =

England international rugby union player (born 1951)

Stephen Graham Ford Mills (born 24 February 1951) is a former England international rugby union player. A hooker, he played his club rugby for Gloucester.

Mills was born in Cirencester, Gloucestershire, and educated at Cirencester Grammar School and Gloucestershire Technical College. His first rugby club was Cirencester RFC. He moved to Gloucester in 1975, playing 303 games for the Cherry & Whites before retiring in 1985. He represented Gloucestershire, The South and South West and the Barbarians. He captained England 'B' in 1980 and won five full caps for England.
