= David Trick (rugby union) =

England international rugby union player

- Full name: David Mark Trick
- Born: 26 October 1960 (age 66) Dartford, England
- Height: 6 ft (183 cm)
- Weight: 190 lb (86 kg)
- School: Bryanston School

Rugby union career
- Position: Wing
International career
Years	Team	Apps	(Points)
1983–84	England	2	(0)

David Mark Trick (born 26 October 1960) is an English former rugby union international who represented England in two Test matches during the 1980s.

Dartford-born Trick grew up in Tavistock, Devon and attended Bryanston School.

Known for his pace, Trick was an England schoolboys sprint champion and became a regular fixture on the wings for Bath, with his career including four successive John Player Cup titles.

Trick earned his first England cap in a 1983 Five Nations Test against Ireland at Lansdowne Road. He was a member of the touring party which travelled to South Africa in 1984 and featured in the Test at Port Elizabeth.

== See also ==
- List of England national rugby union players
