= Paul Simpson (rugby union) =

England international rugby union player

- Full name: Paul Donald Simpson
- Born: 7 June 1958 (age 68) Leeds, England
- School: The John Bentley School

Rugby union career
- Position: Flanker / No. 8
International career
Years	Team	Apps	(Points)
1983–87	England	3	(0)

Paul Donald Simpson (born 7 June 1958) is an English former rugby union international.

Simpson was born in Leeds and attended The John Bentley School in Calne, Wiltshire.

A back-rower, Simpson played his early rugby with Gosforth and was then at Bath from 1982 until retirement. He made the first of his three England appearances in 1983, as a flanker in a win over the All Blacks at Twickenham.

== See also ==
- List of England national rugby union players
