= Gareth Chilcott =

England international rugby union player

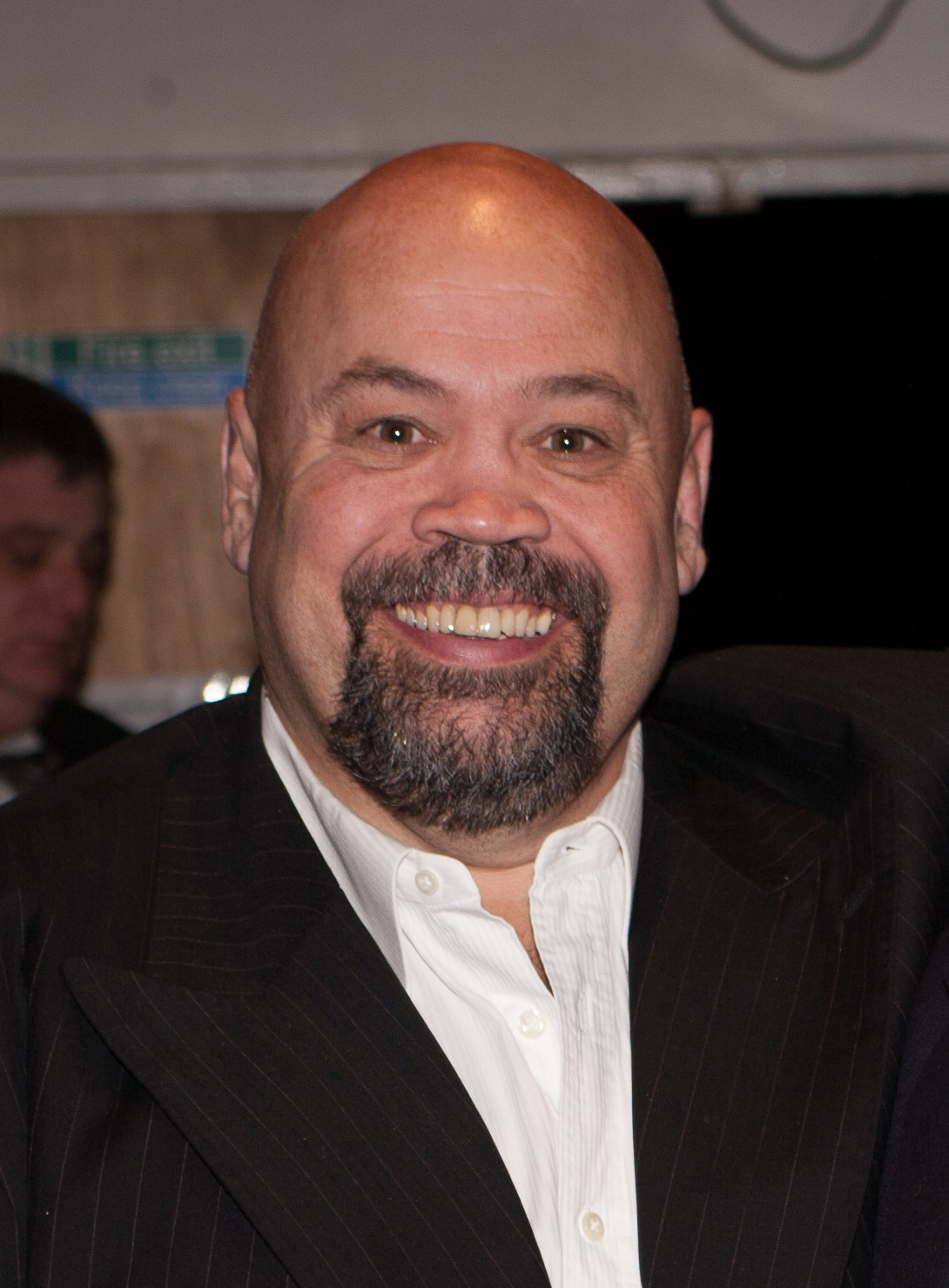
- Chilcott at Farnborough Rugby Club, 12 May 2012
- Born: Gareth James Chilcott; 20 November 1956 (age 69) Bristol, England
- Height: 5 ft 9 in (175 cm)
- Weight: 123 kg (271 lb)
- School: Ashton Park School

Rugby union career
- Position: Prop
Senior career
Years	Team	Apps	(Points)
1977-1993	Bath	373	(85)
International career
Years	Team	Apps	(Points)
1984-1989	England	14	(0)

Gareth James Chilcott (born 20 November 1956 in Bristol) is a former rugby union player, who played at prop for Bath and England.

He made his England debut against Australia in 1984. He toured with the British Lions in Australia in 1989, together with, among others, Andy Robinson and Jeremy Guscott.

He acted in the revived stage play Up 'n' Under which was set around a rugby league sevens tournament.

Chilcott is also a Bristol City supporter and goes to many home and away games.

He appeared in a rugby special of Come Dine with Me with Martin Offiah, Victor Ubogu, and Kyran Bracken which was shown in September 2011.

In 2012, Chilcott established Venatour, a sports travel company based in Cheltenham. He also hosts a regular online opinion show, Cooch's Corner, featuring opinion and rugby guests.

== Charitable work ==
He is an active Honorary President of the rugby charity Wooden Spoon in Somerset, improving the lives of disadvantaged children and young people in Britain and Ireland.

He is also an ambassador for SOS International Rugby Board Kit Aid. SOS/IRB Kit Aid is a "green" rugby project that gives less-advantaged children around the world a chance to play and develop rugby in emerging nations through the collection and distribution of unused/unwanted recycled rugby kit from the UK and Ireland.
