= Stuart Barnes =

English rugby union commentator and former player

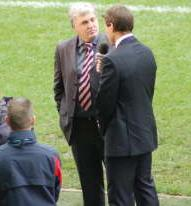
- Barnes in 2006
- Born: 22 November 1962 (age 63) Grays, Essex, England
- Height: 5 ft 6 in (1.68 m)
- Weight: 86 kg (13 st 8 lb)
- School: Bassaleg School
- University: St Edmund Hall, University of Oxford
- Occupation: Sports Commentator

Rugby union career
- Position: Fly-half
Amateur team(s)
Years	Team	Apps	(Points)
1980–1983	Newport RFC		
1983–1985	Bristol		
1985–1994	Bath		
International career
Years	Team	Apps	(Points)
1984–1993	England	10	(34)
1993	British Lions	0	(0)

Stuart Barnes (born 22 November 1962) is an English rugby union journalist and commentator, and former player. He is a commentator for Sky Sports and writes for The Times.

Barnes played fly-half for Newport RFC, Bristol and Bath, and represented England and the British Lions.

== Early life ==
Born in Grays, Essex, he played schoolboy international rugby for the Wales under-18 national team.

Barnes studied at St Edmund Hall, Oxford, matriculating in 1981. He won three rugby Blues; he played for Oxford against Cambridge University's Rob Andrew in the Varsity match. He graduated from Oxford with a third-class honours degree in history.

== Rugby career ==
While at university, Barnes played club rugby for Newport RFC. He later played for Bristol, including in the 1984 RFU final against Bath. After being on the losing side for Bristol in that match, he joined Bath.

He arrived at Bath aged 22: "disaffected with England and, with my volatile character, I could easily have drifted out of the game altogether. At the time the big joke was that I'd had more clubs than Jack Nicklaus – Newport, Bristol and Bath by 22 and people doubted my character, they thought of me as being very fickle and at Bath I found what I wanted – a rugby home.".

He was nicknamed The Bath Barrel.

Barnes played for the Barbarians against Wales in October 1990, converting three tries in the Barbarians' victory.

Barnes' last game was Pilkington Cup Final against Leicester on 7 May 1994, which Bath won 21–9.

== International ==
Barnes made his England debut against Australia in November 1984. He gained 10 caps for England and played his last international match in 1993 against Ireland.

He was selected for the British Lions' 1993 tour to New Zealand, but was not picked for any of the international matches.

=== Media career ===
After retiring, Barnes resigned from his job at the Bristol and West building society. He became a freelance writer and reporter for The Daily Telegraph, and wrote his autobiography Smelling of Roses.

He later began working in broadcasting, first with the BBC, and then joined Sky Sports in 1994.
