= Tony Swift =

England international rugby union player

Anthony Hugh Swift (born 24 May 1959) is a former English international rugby player; a winger, he played 6 tests for England from 1981 to 1984.

== Career ==
Swift, born in Preston, Lancashire, played for Fylde and Swansea before enjoying numerous League and Cup successes with Bath Rugby. He retired in 1995 as Bath's top try scorer (161) and the record try scorer in the Pilkington Cup.
