= Nigel Redman =

England international rugby union player

- Born: Nigel Charles Redman; 16 August 1964 (age 62) Cardiff
- Height: 6 ft 4 in (1.93 m)
- Weight: 240 lb (110 kg)

Rugby union career
- Position: Lock
Amateur team(s)
Years	Team	Apps	(Points)
1982-1984	Weston-super-Mare RFC		
Senior career
Years	Team	Apps	(Points)
1984-1999	Bath	350	(175)
International career
Years	Team	Apps	(Points)
1984-1997	England	20	(4)
1997	British & Irish Lions	4	(0)

Nigel Charles Redman (born 16 August 1964) is a former professional rugby union player who played as a lock for Bath and the England national team.

Born in Cardiff, Redman left school at the age of 15 to become an apprentice electrician.

He began his rugby career aged 15 playing for Weston-super-Mare RFC. He made his England debut in November 1984 vs the Australia national rugby union team at Twickenham, losing 19-3. He made his final international appearance in July 1997 vs Australia in Sydney, losing 25-6. In total he won 20 caps and played in the front, second and back rows. He played in the 1987 and 1991 Rugby World Cups and was called up to the 1997 British Lions tour to South Africa making 4 appearance for the mid-week team, all of which the Lions won. He made 350 appearances in club rugby for Bath between 1984 and 1999. He started for Bath in the victorious 1998 Heineken Cup Final as they defeated Brive.

Since retiring from professional rugby he has coached Basingstoke R.F.C., England Under 19s, England Under 20s and Worcester Warriors rugby union teams and has been an after dinner speaker and commentator on Sky Sports. He has also appeared on BT Sport's weekly rugby television programme, Rugby Tonight.

In 2014 Redman was appointed by British Swimming as Elite Coach Development Manager. Redman was responsible for selecting the five pool and two open-water coaches for the Rio Olympics.
