= Jack Rowell =

English rugby union coach and executive (1937–2024)

Jack Rowell OBE (1 November 1936 – 1 July 2024) was an English rugby union coach and executive. He was coach of Bath and England.

== Rugby career ==
=== Playing ===
Rowell played as a Lock for Hartlepool Rovers and Middlesbrough RUFC. He was injured in trials for Oxford University RFC and was recommended not to play again, but restarted playing in his late 20s at Gosforth RFC.

=== Coaching ===
From 1972 Rowell coached Gosforth, leading them to victory in the John Player Cup in 1975/76 and 1976/77, before his business career took him to the South West.

Between 1978 and 1994 Rowell coached Bath during their golden era, winning eight John Player/Pilkington Cups and five League Championships.

Rowell was the coach of the England rugby team from 1994 to 1997. He took over from Geoff Cooke, announcing that England would give up the forward-dominated, risk-free strategies that had won so many Five Nations Championship titles in the past, instead adopting a 'running rugby' style. Rowell's England won twenty-one of their twenty-nine matches, including the 1995 World Cup quarter-final against Australia. In percentage terms of games won Rowell is England's second most successful rugby union coach.

In 2002 he returned to Bath as director of rugby.

=== Administration ===
In 1998 Rowell became a non-executive director on the board of Bristol, when millionaire businessman Malcolm Pearce saved the club from extinction. In September 2000 he became managing director.

== Business career ==
Rowell was Chairman of Celsis plc, Chairman of UK products Ltd which is quoted on AIM and Chairman of Turleigh Ltd, a private company.

He acted as chairman of a number of companies in the public and private sectors, mainly in food. He was previously an executive director on the board of Dalgety plc with responsibility for the consumer foods division.

== Personal life and death ==
Rowell was born on 1 November 1936 in Hartlepool. On 1 July 2024, Rowell died at the age of 87.

== Honours ==
Rowell was awarded the OBE for services to the game of Rugby Union.

In 1994, he was awarded an Honorary Degree (Doctor of Laws) by the University of Bath.

Preceded by Geoff Cooke	English national rugby coach 1994–1997	Succeeded by Clive Woodward
