= Richard Hill (rugby union, born 1961) =

England international rugby union player

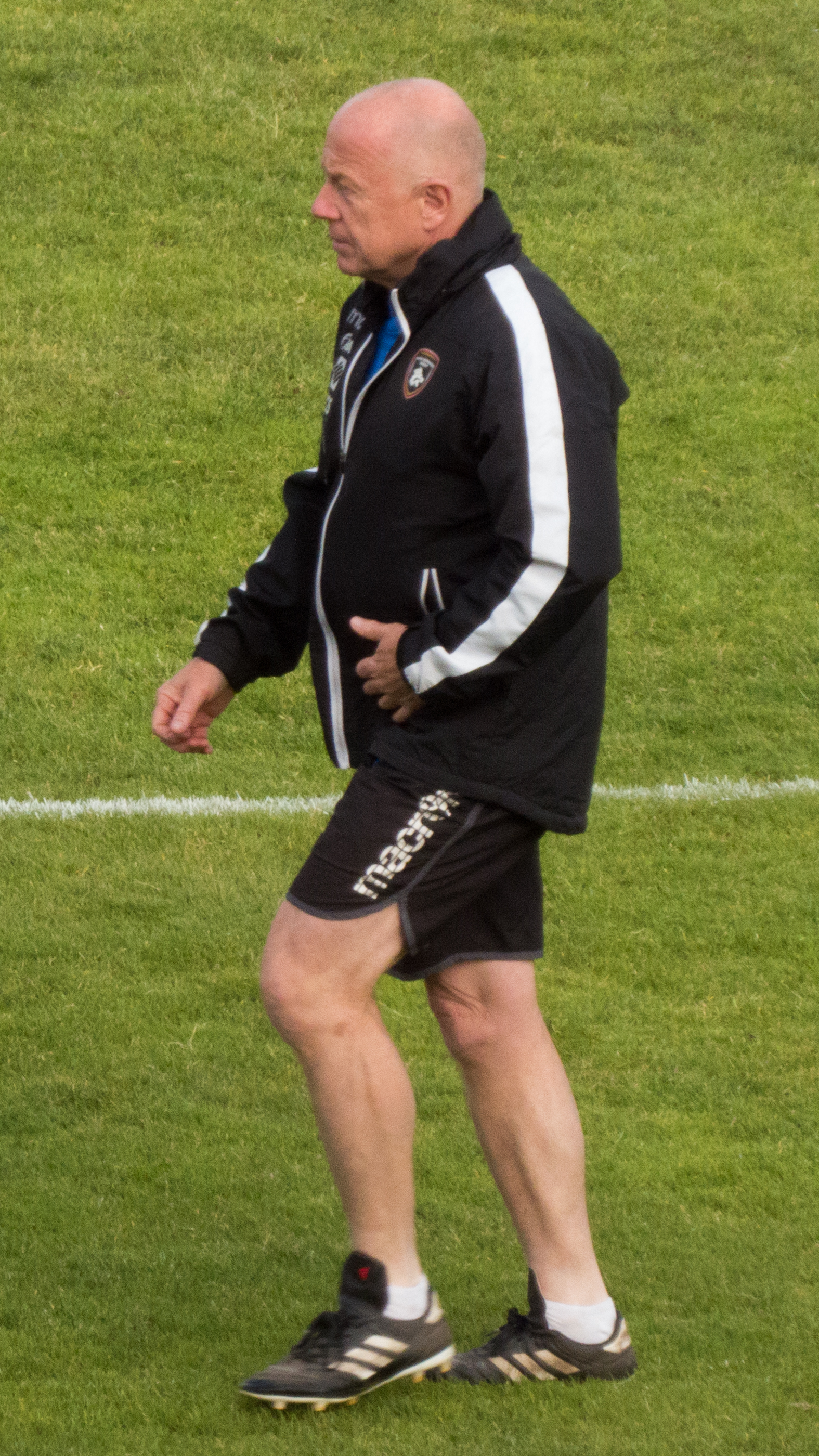
- Hill at Stade Maurice Boyau on 27 April 2019 during the match between US Dax ‒ Rouen Normandie Rugby
- Born: Richard John Hill; 4 May 1961 (age 65) Birmingham, England
- Height: 5 ft 7 in (1.70 m)
- Weight: 12 st 2 lb (77 kg)
- School: Bishop Wordsworth's Grammar School

Rugby union career
- Position: Scrum-Half
Senior career
Years	Team	Apps	(Points)
1983–1994	Bath	248	(260)
International career
Years	Team	Apps	(Points)
1984–1991	England	29	(8)
Coaching career
- Years: Team
- -1999: Gloucester
- 1999-2002: Harlequins
- 2002-2003: Newport
- 2003-2009: Bristol
- 2009-2010: Chalon-sur-Saône
- 2010-2013: Worcester Warriors
- 2013-: Rouen Normandie Rugby
- Correct as of 18 April 2013

Richard Hill (born 4 May 1961 in Birmingham) is a rugby union coach and former player. He won 29 international caps for England.

== Biography ==
Born in Birmingham, Hill was educated at Bishop Wordsworth's Grammar School in Salisbury, and Exeter University. His namesake, Richard Hill, who was a flanker in the England team that won the Rugby World Cup in 2003 also attended Bishop Wordsworth's School and both played for Salisbury Rugby Football Club.

=== Early successes at Schools Level ===
One of Richard's early successes in 1980 was winning the Wiltshire Schools U18 Sevens tournament with Salisbury's Boys Grammar school Bishop Wordsworth's defeating Swindon's St. Joseph's Comprehensive Roman Catholic School at the Headlands School in Wiltshire. The Salisbury school won by two tries to one. Bishop Wordsworth were also able to field David Egerton who was also capped by England 9 times.

=== Playing career ===
Joining Bath as a scrum-half straight from university, in these amateur times his day job was working for Lloyds Bank. Hill loved training. Nicknamed Duracell, he spent all his available time there, and his dedication spelled the inevitable introduction of the professional era. In 1984 he debuted for England as scrum half against South Africa in Port Elizabeth on the controversial tour. In the 1987 season, he was made captain of England, losing the captaincy after the England-Wales match.

In the autumn of 1990, he rejoined the England squad and went on to play 20 consecutive games until his retirement. Richard was a major component in England's excellent form in the first three matches of the 1990 Five Nations campaign and he often provided the ammunition for the likes of Guscott, Carling and Underwood. He even managed to score his first try for England when he touched down against Wales. His final cap was in the 1991 World Cup Final against Australia. Source: http://www.sporting-heroes.net/rugby/england/richard-1961-hill-12718/brief-biography-of-international-rugby-career_a03277/

=== Coaching career ===
After assistant posts at Gloucester and Harlequins, Hill also spent a season as head coach of England Students and the backs coach as Ebbw Vale RFC. In 2002 he was appointed head coach of Newport RFC. A year later he joined Bristol Rugby, leading them back to the Guinness Premiership after two seasons, and then to third place and the playoffs in the 2006–7 season. In July 2009, he agreed to join French third division side Chalon-sur-Saône as head coach.

In May 2010, Hill was named as head coach for Worcester Warriors. Richard Hill in his first year as head coach, coached the Worcester Warriors back into the Aviva Premiership and held a contract at the Warriors until 2014.

On 16 April 2013, Hill was sacked from his post at Worcester "following the club's recent run of form".

Hill, a fluent French speaker, moved to France to continue his coaching career where he was hired as General Manager in 2013 of Rouen, where he led them to the French Amateur Championship of France. Hill is committed to Rouen until 2023.

Sporting positions
Preceded by Nigel Melville	England national rugby union team captain Feb–Mar 1987	Succeeded by Mike Harrison
