= Jon Hall (rugby union) =

England international rugby union player

Jonathan Peter Hall (born 15 March 1962 (age 64)) is a retired rugby union player who played for Bath Rugby, Somerset, Barbarians, South & South Western Counties and England. He was born in Bath.

Hall primarily played as a blind side flanker or number eight. His international debut was versus Scotland in 1984. He did travel with the 1987 England World Cup team but did not play a match as he was injured in training and had to return to the UK. After starting his international career against Scotland, his final match was also against Scotland in 1994, where Hall made a crucial tackle to deny Gary Armstrong a try, which ultimately won England the match. He ultimately gained 21 caps.

After retiring Hall was appointed director of rugby for the 1995–96 season and led them to league and cup double and led the club into the professional era but departed in following season. Subsequently, he became coach of the Garryowen club and took them to the All Ireland Final in 1999.
