= St Mary the Virgin =

St Mary the Virgin may refer to:

== People ==
- Mary, mother of Jesus

== Churches ==
- Reading Minster (known as the Minster Church of St Mary the Virgin), England
- St Mary the Virgin, Alderbury, Wiltshire, England
- St Mary the Virgin, Aldermanbury, England
- St Mary the Virgin, Aldworth, Berkshire, England
- St Mary the Virgin, Alton Barnes, Wiltshire, England
- St Mary the Virgin, Blackburn Hamlet, Canada
- St Mary the Virgin, Brampton Ash, England
- St Mary the Virgin, Brighton, England
- St Mary the Virgin, Barnes, England
- St Mary the Virgin, Bathwick, England
- St Mary the Virgin, Bottesford, Leicestershire, England
- St Mary the Virgin Church, Caerau, Cardiff, Wales
- St Mary the Virgin, Car Colston, Nottinghamshire, England
- St Mary the Virgin, Corringham, Essex, Englind
- St Mary the Virgin, Cottingham, East Yorkshire, England
- St Mary the Virgin, East Barnet, England
- Church of St Mary the Virgin, Eccles, England
- St Mary the Virgin, Ellenbrook, Greater Manchester, England
- St Mary the Virgin, Gillingham, Dorset, England
- St Mary the Virgin, Great Snoring, Norfolk, England
- St Mary the Virgin, Heacham, Norfolk, England
- St Mary the Virgin, Henbury, England
- St Mary the Virgin, Henlow, Bedfordshire, England
- St Mary the Virgin, Iffley, Oxford, England
- St Mary the Virgin Church, Ilford, London, England
- St Mary the Virgin, Ilmington, Warwickshire, England
- St Mary the Virgin, Ivinghoe, Buckinghamshire, England
- St Mary the Virgin, Langley, England
- St Mary the Virgin, Lytchett Matravers, Dorset, England
- St Mary the Virgin, Middleton, Leeds, England
- St Mary the Virgin, Monken Hadley, England
- St Mary the Virgin, Newington, Swale, England
- St Mary the Virgin, Northolt, England
- St Mary the Virgin, North Shoebury, Essex, England
- St Mary the Virgin, Pateley Bridge, North Yorkshire, England
- St Mary the Virgin, Prittlewell, Essex, England
- Church of St Mary the Virgin, Salford, Bedfordshire, England
- St Mary the Virgin, Seaham, County Durham, England
- St Mary the Virgin, Staverton, Northamptonshire, England
- University Church of St Mary the Virgin, Oxford, England
- St Mary the Virgin, Westerham, Kent, England
- The Episcopal Church of St Mary the Virgin, San Francisco, California, US
