= Chase Stanley =

New Zealand international rugby league player

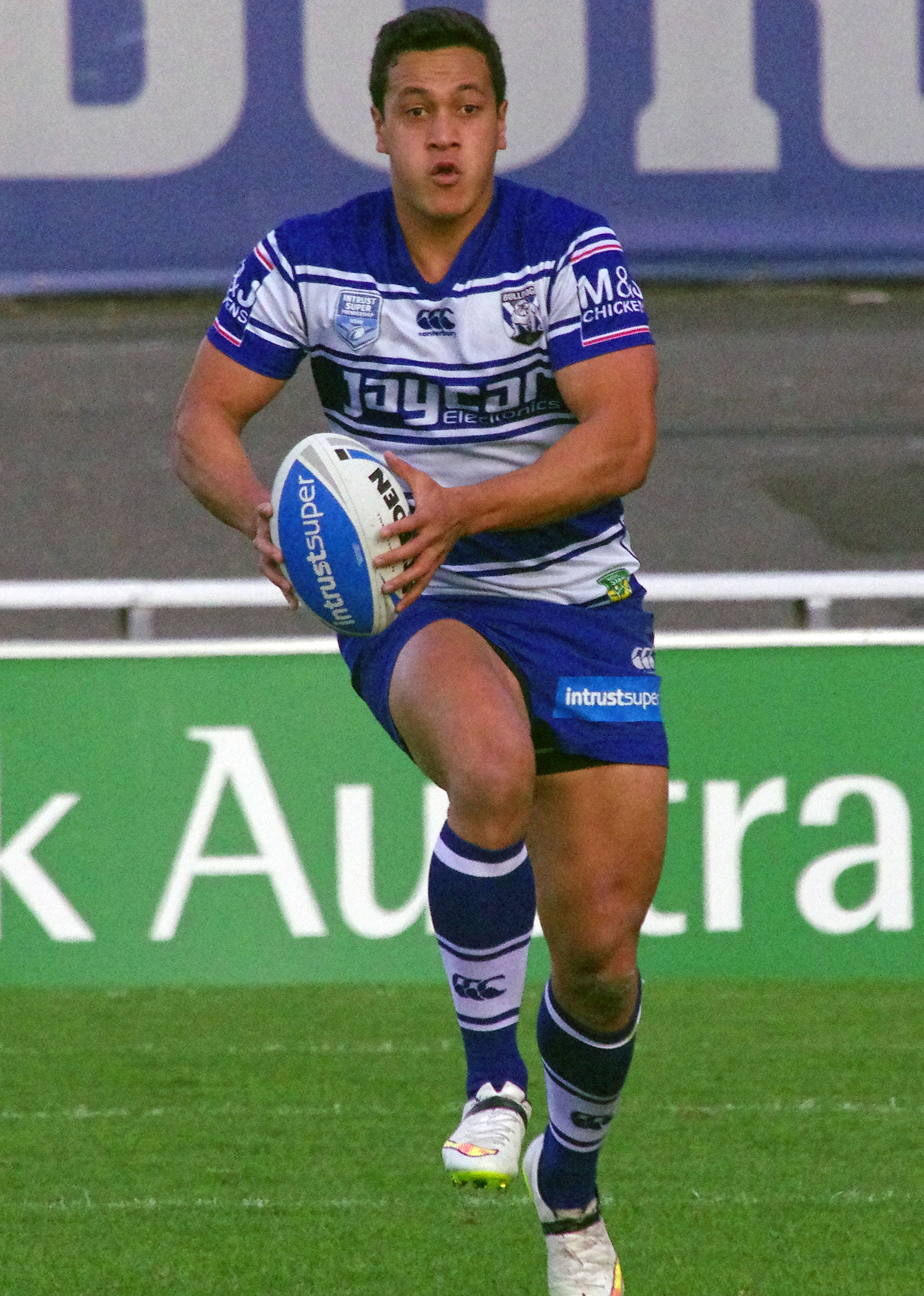

Personal information
- Born: 31 May 1989 (age 37) Sydney, New South Wales, Australia
- Height: 188 cm (6 ft 2 in)
- Weight: 97 kg (15 st 4 lb)

Playing information
- Position: Centre, Wing, Five-eighth
Club
Years	Team	Pld	T	G	FG	P
2007–09	St. George Illawarra	41	13	0	0	52
2010–11	Melbourne Storm	8	2	1	0	10
2012–13	St. George Illawarra	32	3	24	0	60
2014–17	Canterbury Bulldogs	29	10	5	0	50
2018–20	Toronto Wolfpack	19	9	0	0	36
	Total	129	37	30	0	208
Representative
Years	Team	Pld	T	G	FG	P
2007	New Zealand	2	2	0	0	8
2007–08	New Zealand Māori	2	2	0	0	8
- Source: As of 6 October 2018
- Relatives: Kyle Stanley (brother)

Chase Stanley (born 31 May 1989) is a New Zealand former international rugby league footballer who last played as a centre or winger for the Toronto Wolfpack in the Super League.

He previously played for the St. George Illawarra Dragons in two separate spells, as well as the Melbourne Storm and the Canterbury-Bankstown Bulldogs in the NRL.

== Early years ==
Stanley was born in Sydney, New South Wales, Australia. He is of Māori and Samoan descent and attended Belmore South Public School in Belmore and Endeavour Sports High School in Caringbah.

== Playing career ==
In 2005 he was contracted to St. George Illawarra as a junior and continued to play there in the 2nd tier competitions till he debuted on the NRL in 2007. He played 41 games for the St. George club between 2007 and 2009.

Stanley signed a two-year deal with the Melbourne Storm starting in the 2010 NRL season. He made his Melbourne debut on 30 May 2010, but would only make eight appearances for the club, suffering a season-ending knee injury in round 1 of the 2011 NRL season.

At the end of the 2013 NRL season, Stanley signed a two-year deal with the Canterbury-Bankstown Bulldogs starting in 2014 NRL season.

In March 2018 he signed with Canadian team the Toronto Wolfpack.

== Representative career ==
Stanley made his international rugby league debut for the New Zealand Kiwis in their third Test against the Great Britain national rugby league team in November 2007. Although the Kiwis lost to Great Britain, Stanley had a personally successful debut, scoring two tries.

Stanley is eligible to represent Samoa, and was named in the Samoa training squad for the 2008 Rugby League World Cup as well as the New Zealand training squad, but missed out on final selection for both.

He did, however, represent the New Zealand Māori in the curtain-raiser to the Australia v New Zealand World Cup match, kicking one goal and scoring a long-range intercept try.

== Family ==
Stanley is one of the famous increasing 'Stanley' Rugby Clan – which include:

- 'Smokin' Joe (All Black World Cup Winner 1987, Auckland)
- Jeremy (All Black 1997, Auckland)
- Benson (All Black 2010) (Auckland Blues Super 14 2008, Clermont Ferrand)
- Winston (NZ U20 World Cup Winner 2009, NZ U19 World Cup Winner 2007, Auckland, Harlequins)
- Martin (Auckland)
- Michael (Saracens & England U16s 2006, U18s 2007, U20's 2007/8, 2008/09), Samoa RWC2015
- Sam (Saracens & England U16s 2008, England U18s AER 2009, Bedford Blues, Ealing, England 7's)

His younger brother Kyle Stanley played for the St. George Illawarra Dragons but retired in October 2015 due to ongoing injuries. Chase is also the nephew of socceroos star Tim Cahill.

He also has four sons with wife Cara Stanley.
