= Cunningham Duncombe Series =

The Cunningham Duncombe Series is a series of pre-season friendlies between two English Rugby Union clubs; London Irish and Harlequins. The series is named in memory of two late former players, Jarrod Cunningham of London Irish and Nick Duncombe of Harlequins. The series was conceived in 2015 and kicked off with two matches played at Twickenham Stoop in back-to-back weeks. Although both matches were played at the Stoop. The teams took it in turns to act as the home side.

It was confirmed on 4 July, 2016 that the series would continue in 2016. Staged as a single home match for Harlequins at the Stoop.

The 2017 event would be London Irish's turn to host and would be held at their Hazelwood training ground.

| Year | Date | Home | Score | Away | Stadium | Victor |
|---|---|---|---|---|---|---|
| 2015 | 25 September | Harlequins | 22–17 | London Irish | Twickenham Stoop | Harlequins |
| 2015 | 2 October | London Irish | 29–37 | Harlequins | Twickenham Stoop | Harlequins |
| 2016 | 13 August | Harlequins | 12–28 | London Irish | Twickenham Stoop | London Irish |
| 2017 | 12 August | London Irish | 29–31 | Harlequins | Hazelwood | Harlequins |
