= Corringham, Essex =

Town in Essex, England

Coordinates: 51.525°N 0.460°E

Corringham
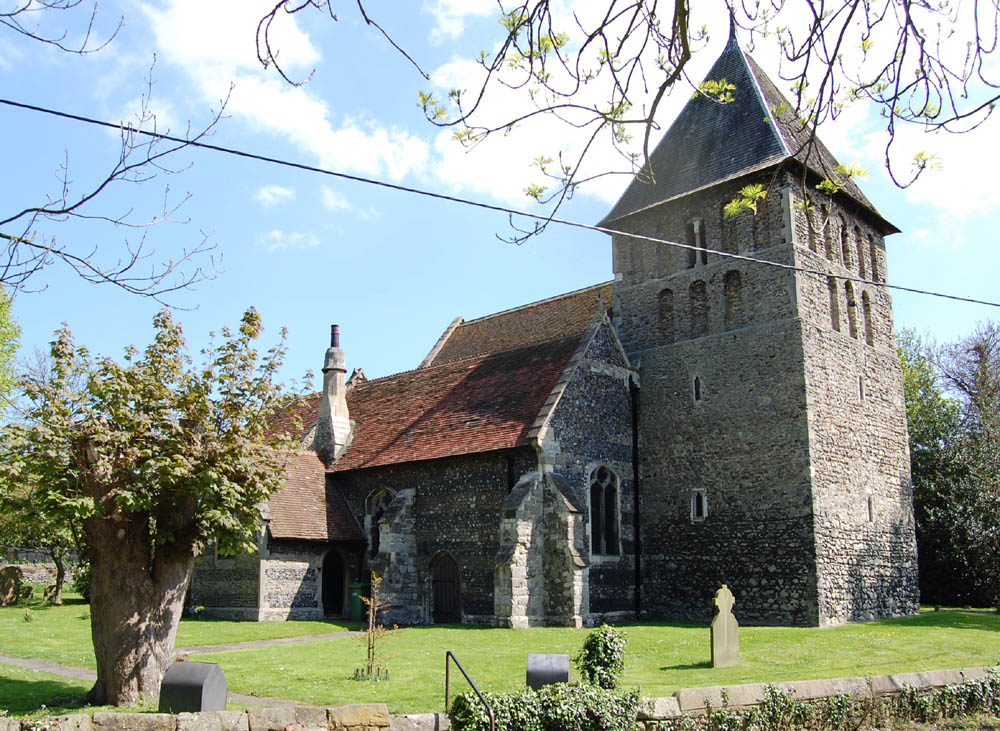
- St Mary the Virgin Church, Corringham

- Location within Essex
- OS grid reference: TQ708832
- Unitary authority: Thurrock
- Ceremonial county: Essex
- Region: East
- Country: England
- Sovereign state: United Kingdom
- Post town: STANFORD-LE-HOPE
- Postcode district: SS17
- Dialling code: 01375
- Police: Essex
- Fire: Essex
- Ambulance: East of England
- UK Parliament: South Basildon and East Thurrock

Corringham is a town in the borough of Thurrock in Essex, England. It lies immediately east of Stanford-le-Hope, its post town, and Corringham is now classed as part of the Stanford-le-Hope built up area by the Office for National Statistics. It lies about 24 miles (39 km) east of London (Note: Measured from the town centre to St Paul's Cathedral.) and 3 miles (4.8 km) south of Basildon. Corringham lies on a hill overlooking the Thames between Canvey Island and Tilbury Fort. It is 6 miles (9.7 km) north-east of Grays, the administrative centre of Thurrock.

Corringham was an ancient parish. It was abolished as a civil parish in 1936 on the creation of Thurrock Urban District, which in turn became the modern borough of Thurrock in 1974. Corringham remains an ecclesiastical parish in the Church of England. St Mary the Virgin Church is the parish church, which originated in the Saxon period from the time of St Cedd in the 7th century.

Corringham was formerly served by the Corringham Light Railway which connected the Kynoch munitions factory with the London, Tilbury and Southend Railway. The small historic heart is one of the seven conservation areas in the borough. The town is located close to the A13.

== History ==
=== Early history of Corringham ===
In 1970 excavations took place at the site of the old railway terminus, south of Fobbing Road, revealing the remains of Mesolithic (Middle Stone Age) tools.

=== Saxon period ===
It is likely that where the church stands today, Curra the Tribal Chief of the Saxons came with mercenaries following and replacing Roman soldiers of the 1st and 2nd centuries, who then over the following centuries settled as permanent residents of Corringham.

By the 7th century Corringham would have had a Saxon community, and it is thought that St Cedd, who established Tilbury Monastery in AD 653, established a church here. The last Saxon Lord of Corringham was known as Sigar in 1066, and is mentioned in the Domesday Book of 1086 as holding 1 manor, 4 hides and 10 acres.

=== Origin of the name ===
The place-name 'Corringham' is first attested in the Domesday Book of 1086, where it appears as Currincham. It appears as Curingeham in the Feet of Fines for 1204. The name means 'the village of Curra's people'.

=== Parish church, St Mary the Virgin ===
St Mary the Virgin Church is of Saxon origin. Herringbone stonework can be seen on the exterior of both the nave and the chancel. There are other Saxon features inside the church. The tower is also likely to be Saxon.

From the 7th century a wooden structure was erected here where the nave is situated today, this would have been similar in construction to that of Greensted Church near Ongar in Essex, around the 9th century Viking raids on Corringham meant that the church was reinforced by building 3' thick walls around the structure.

=== Normans, Bishop Odo, and the Baud family ===
With the Norman invasion of England in 1066, Corringham came under Norman rule, and was owned and administered by Bishop Odo who was bishop of London. The church underwent a building programme around the year 1100, with the west tower being built around this time. Inside St Mary the Virgin Church, at the arched entrance to the west tower, a Norman carving of a Norman complete with moustache can be seen; it is possible this depicts Bishop Odo.

The Baud Family originally from Germany came over with William the Conqueror in 1066, and became landowners in Corringham, mentioned in 1210, soon after gaining hunting rights.

=== Mariners and smugglers ===
Corringham, being situated in close proximity to the marshes and the Thames, has always had a connection to the movement of goods and shipping. One ancient pathway which still exists passes from the coast, through the cemetery and to the side of the Bull Inn, and then continues on to Hadleigh Castle and South Benfleet.

== Governance ==
There is one tier of local government covering Corringham, at unitary authority level: Thurrock Council, based in Grays. Two of Thurrock's wards have Corringham in their names: Corringham and Fobbing, and Stanford East and Corringham Town.

=== Administrative history ===
Corringham was an ancient parish in the Barstable Hundred of Essex. When elected parish and district councils were established in 1894, Corringham was included in the Orsett Rural District. The civil parish and the rural district were both abolished in 1936. Most of the old parish of Corringham became part of the new Thurrock Urban District, with the exception of a smaller uninhabited part that was transferred instead to Bowers Gifford. At the 1931 census (the last before the abolition of the civil parish), Corringham had a population of 1,897.

Thurrock Urban District was reformed to become a non-metropolitan district with borough status called Thurrock in 1974. Thurrock Borough Council became a unitary authority in 1998, taking over county-level services in the borough which until then had been provided by Essex County Council. Thurrock remains part of the ceremonial county of Essex for the purposes of lieutenancy.

Although abolished as a civil parish in 1936, Corringham remains one of Thurrock's Church of England ecclesiastical parishes, stretching from Horseshoe Bay in the Thames Estuary to Dry Street, south of Langdon Hills.

== Demography ==
Population figures are no longer published separately for Corringham, with it not being a parish, ward, or separate built up area. It is now classed as part of the Stanford-le-Hope built up area by the Office for National Statistics. That built up area had a population of 29,525 at the 2021 census.

At the 2021 census, the Corringham and Fobbing ward (which also includes the village of Fobbing) had a population of 5,686, and the Stanford East and Corringham Town ward (which also includes eastern parts of Stanford-le-Hope) had a population of 8,653.

== Schools ==
- Ortu Corringham Primary School, Herd Lane
- Giffards Primary School, Queen Elizabeth Drive
- Graham James Primary School, The Sorrells
- Ortu Gable Hall School, Southend Road. A specialist performing arts and applied learning college.

== Sport and leisure ==
Corringham had a non-League football club, East Thurrock United F.C. who played at Rookery Hill but went into liquidation in 2023

== Notable people ==
- Mark-Anthony Turnage – composer
- Michael Stanley – Samoan international rugby player, educated at Gable Hall School
- Denise Van Outen – actress, singer and television presenter
- Rylan Clark-Neal – television presenter, reality TV star, singer, LGBT advocate, model
