= Kyle Stanley (rugby league) =

Samoa international rugby league footballer

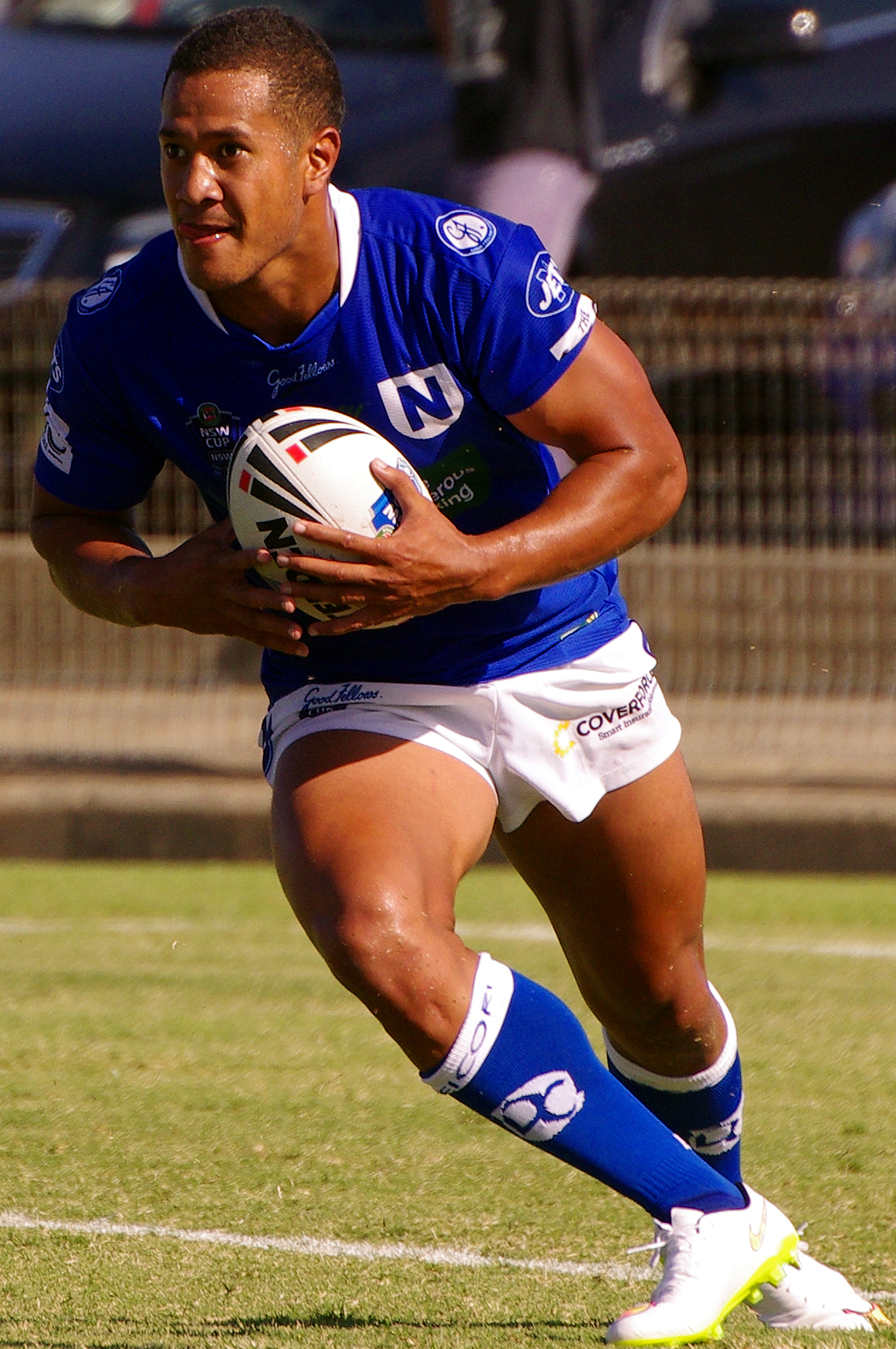

Personal information
- Born: 2 April 1991 (age 35) Sydney, New South Wales, Australia

Playing information
- Height: 182 cm (6 ft 0 in)
- Weight: 94 kg (14 st 11 lb)
- Position: Centre, Fullback, Five-eighth, Halfback, Hooker
Club
Years	Team	Pld	T	G	FG	P
2010–14	St. George Illawarra	46	17	15	0	98
Representative
Years	Team	Pld	T	G	FG	P
2014	Samoa	3	0	3	0	6
- Relatives: Chase Stanley (brother)

Kyle Stanley (born 2 April 1991) is a former Samoa international rugby league footballer who played as a centre for the St George Illawarra Dragons in the NRL between 2010 and 2014.

== Background ==
Stanley was born in Sydney, New South Wales, Australia. He is of Māori and Samoan Australian descent.

He is younger brother of fellow professional Chase Stanley.

== Early life ==
In his juniors, Stanley played for Hurstville United JRLFC, the same junior rugby league club that former Dragons players Anthony Mundine and Lance Thompson did.

== Playing career ==
=== 2009 ===
Stanley was part of the Dragons Under 20's team in the Toyota Cup throughout 2009 and 2010.

=== 2010 ===
Kyle made his debut in the NRL for the St. George Illawarra Dragons in round 11, 2010, at WIN Stadium Wollongong against the Canberra Raiders. He debuted at Fullback, and scored a try. He went on to play a total of 8 NRL games in 2010.

On 6 September 2010, Stanley was selected in the Samoan train on squad.

=== 2011 ===
In January 2011, Stanley was named in the Daily Telegraphs '50 Rising Australian Sports Stars'.

In an interview with the Illawarra Mercury published on 1 February 2011, Stanley said the following things about his desires and ambitions for the Dragons: "This is my club," he said. "I've played my juniors here so I want to stay at the club. "This is my dream, playing for St George Illawarra, so hopefully I can keep it like that."

On 7 April 2011, it was confirmed that Stanley had resigned with the Dragons for a further 3 years which will see him stay at the club until at least the end of the 2014 season. In an interview after resigning, Stanley said: "As a local junior from the St George area growing up playing with Hurstville United, I’ve always wanted to continue my career at the Dragons," "My last two years under Wayne Bennett have been very beneficial and I’m looking forward to continuing my development under Steve Price who will be the Head Coach of the Dragons from 2012."

On 27 April 2011, Stanley decided to reject the offer of pledging his allegiance to New Zealand and have the opportunity to represent the Kiwis, rather choosing to represent the country of his birth, Australia, in hope of playing both State Of Origin and for the Kangaroos.

In June 2011, ahead of State Of Origin Game II, Stanley, along with 6 other 'Blues in waiting' – Tariq Sims, Ryan James, Jamie Buhrer, Michael Oldfield, Jacob Loko & Josh Jackson, was in camp with the NSW Blues by invitation of coach Ricky Stuart, who was keen to have budding stars initiated in the new Origin culture he was trying to build.

=== 2012 ===
On 12 January 2012 Stanley was named in the 'NSW Blues in waiting squad'. A camp at Coogee coordinated by coach Ricky Stuart for players who he believes have potential to feature in future New South Wales Origin teams.

Despite pledging his allegiance to Australia and New South Wales, it was reported on 15 May 2012, that Kyle had decided to represent New Zealand. When interviewed on his decision Kyle said ‘‘I said last year that I wanted to play for Australia but things change and I want to play for New Zealand,’’ Kyle said. ‘‘At the end of the day, it was a personal decision.’’ He also said that the chance of being able to play alongside his brother Chase Stanley at the international level was also a reason in his decision ‘‘Chase is there and my family are from New Zealand,’’ Kyle said. ‘‘So I chose New Zealand. It is exciting times.’’

On 14 July 2012, during a game against the Cronulla Sharks at Wollongong Showground, Stanley ruptured the anterior cruciate ligament (ACL) in his right knee. An injury that would end the 2012 season for him.

It was reported on 27 November 2012, only 4 months after the injury he sustained to his knee, that Stanley had re-ruptured the anterior cruciate ligament in his right knee after slipping on a wet surface away from training. "I was midway through my recovery, just at home and it started pouring down with rain," Stanley said. "I went outside to bring some things inside off the patio, because they were getting wet. There was a heavy box and I sort of slipped on the tiles and hurt my bad (right) knee as I was carrying it inside."

At the time of the injury, his operating surgeon, Dr. Sorrenti said ‘‘If he has just ruptured his ligament and has no other damage then there is nothing to stop him from having a successful career’’

=== 2013 ===
Stanley spent the entire 2013 NRL season in physical rehabilitation. During an interview on 13 August 2013 – Dragons high performance director Andrew Gray said ‘‘Kyle has just started running and he's looking fantastic’’. ‘‘He is looking great and will be ready to go at the start of next season’’.

=== 2014 ===
In Round 1 against the Wests Tigers at ANZ Stadium, Stanley played his first match for the Dragons since Round 19 2012, playing off the bench in the Dragons 44–24 win. Stanley finished off the Dragons 2014 season with him playing in 9 matches and scoring 1 try (4p). On 8 September 2014, Stanley was selected in the Samoa Four Nations train on squad. On 7 October 2014, Stanley was selected in the Samoa national rugby league team final 24-man squad for the 2014 Four Nations series.

=== 2015 ===
On 19 November 2014, Stanley signed a 1-year contract with the Cronulla-Sutherland Sharks for the 2015 season. During the 2015 season, he tore his ACL a fifth time and required another knee reconstruction. On 2 October, he announced his retirement. He said it was at the recommendation of his surgeon as they had said they didn't feel Stanley's body was fit to play football again.

== Post playing ==
As of 2025, Stanley has been the district manager for the St George Football District he also serves as a Pathways mentor for the St. George Illawarra Dragons.

== Personal life ==
Stanley is one of the famous 'Stanley' Rugby Clan which includes 'Smokin' Joe Stanley, Benson Stanley, Jeremy Stanley, Chase Stanley, Winston Stanley and Jamie Stanley.

Kyle Stanley has two sons with his ex wife.
