= Winston Stanley (rugby union, born 1989) =

Samoa international rugby union footballer

- Born: Winston Thomas Norman Stanley; 11 February 1989 (age 37) Brisbane, Australia
- Height: 1.82 m (6 ft 0 in)
- Weight: 95 kg (14 st 13 lb; 209 lb)
- Notable relative(s): Chris Cahill (cousin); Tim Cahill (cousin); Sean Maitland (cousin); Benson Stanley (brother); Chase Stanley (cousin); Jeremy Stanley (cousin); Joe Stanley (uncle); Kyle Stanley (cousin); Mike Stanley (cousin); Sam Stanley (cousin)

Rugby union career
- Position: Centre / Wing
Senior career
Years	Team	Apps	(Points)
2015–2018	Harlequins	19	(5)
Provincial / State sides
Years	Team	Apps	(Points)
2007–2011	Auckland	30	(25)
2014−2015	Northland	4	(0)
- Correct as of 17 October 2014
Super Rugby
Years	Team	Apps	(Points)
2009–2011	Blues	6	(0)
2012–2013	Force	20	(20)
2014–2015	Highlanders	1	(0)
- Correct as of 2 June 2014
International career
Years	Team	Apps	(Points)
2014−	Samoa	3	(5)
2009	New Zealand U20	4	(10)
- Correct as of 26 November 2016

Winston Stanley (born 11 February 1989 in Brisbane, Australia) is an Australian-born Samoan former rugby union footballer who usually played as a centre and occasionally as a wing.

Stanley began his career in New Zealand, playing for Auckland in the ITM Cup between 2007 and 2011. During that time he also made 6 appearances for the Blues in Super Rugby.

He moved back to his native Australia ahead of the 2012 Super Rugby season and signed for the Perth based Western Force. He made 11 appearances in his first season with the side and scored 2 tries.

Stanley was a member of the New Zealand Under 20 team that won the 2009 IRB Junior World Championship where he was later nominated for IRB junior player of the year losing out to Aaron Cruden.

Winston last played New Zealand club rugby for Dunedin Rugby Football Club.

Though born in Australia and represented the New Zealand Under-20s team, he represents Samoa at international level, making his debut against Italy on 8 November 2014 off the bench.

On 23 April 2015, Stanley moved to England to join Harlequins in the Aviva Premiership for the 2015–16 season.

On 20 March 2018, Stanley announced his immediate retirement from professional rugby due to injury.
