= Renei Batlokwa =

Motswana footballer

Personal information
- Full name: Wedu Reneilwe Batlokwa
- Date of birth: 1 December 1997 (age 28)
- Place of birth: Tlokweng, Botswana
- Position: Midfielder

Team information
- Current team: Maldon & Tiptree

Youth career
- Thurrock
- 2012–2017: Southend United

Senior career*
Years	Team	Apps	(Gls)
2017–2019	Southend United	0	(0)
2018	→ Lowestoft Town (loan)	7	(1)
2019–2020	Brentwood Town	9	(1)
2020	Canvey Island	2	(0)
2022	Concord Rangers	0	(0)
2023–2024	Loughgall	0	(0)
2024	Athlone Town	0	(0)
2024–2025	Maldon & Tiptree	17	(0)
2025–	Bowers & Pitsea	26	(5)

International career
2019	Botswana	1	(0)
- * Club domestic league appearances and goals as of 18:33, 25 January 2025 (UTC)

Wedu Reneilwe Batlokwa (born 1 December 1997) is a Botswana professional footballer who plays as a midfielder for Bowers & Pitsea.

== Early and personal life ==
Batlokwa attended Gable Hall School. As of October 2018 he was fluent in three languages and learning a fourth.

== Club career ==
Batlokwa began his career with Thurrock, joining Southend United at the age of 14. He moved on loan to Lowestoft Town in April 2018. He played with the Southend first team during the 2018–19 pre-season, making his competitive debut on 4 September 2018.

He was released by Southend at the end of the 2018–19 season. Batlokwa then joined Brentwood Town at the end of November 2019. He played for the club until March 2020, where he joined Canvey Island. He was released in the summer 2020.

During the 2022–23 season, Batlokwa had a brief spell with Concord Rangers, however did not play for the club. In January 2023, following his time at Concord Rangers, Batlokwa spent time on trial at Slovak club Tatran Liptovský Mikuláš.

On 1 September 2023, Batlokwa signed for newly promoted NIFL Premiership side Loughgall. Ahead of the 2024 League of Ireland First Division season, after making two Northern Ireland Football League Cup appearances for Loughgall, Batlokwa signed for Athlone Town.

Ahead of the 2024–25 season, Batlokwa returned to England, signing for Isthmian League North Division side Maldon & Tiptree. In April 2025, Batlokwa signed for Bowers & Pitsea.

== International career ==
He made his debut for the Botswana national football team on 14 October 2019 in a friendly against Egypt.
