= Ortu Gable Hall School =

Mossbourne Fobbing Academy

Location
- Southend Road; Corringham; Stanford-le-Hope, Essex, SS17 8JT; England; 51.53328°N 0.44946°E

Information
- Type: Academy
- Motto: "Knowledge Nurtures Wisdom" "Working Together To Ensure Success" (Sixth Form)
- Local authority: Thurrock Council
- Trust: Mossbourne Federation
- Specialist: Arts (performing arts)
- Department for Education URN: 136854 Tables
- Ofsted: Reports
- Director: Sue Weston (Sixth Form)
- Principal: Sam Cooper
- Gender: Coeducational
- Age range: 11-19
- Enrolment: 1390
- Houses: Bussell, Da Vinci, Hepburn, Wonder
- Website: http://www.ortugablehall.org/

Mossbourne Fobbing Academy (formerly Ortu Gable Hall School Gable Hall School) is an oversubscribed coeducational secondary school academy and sixth form located in Corringham (near Stanford-Le-Hope) in Thurrock, Essex, England. Previously a foundation school administered by Thurrock Council, the school academized on 1 July 2011 and became a multi-academy trust in 2013. In 2017 the school was rebranded as Ortu Gable Hall, ortu being Latin for "rising", alongside the trust's rebrand under the same moniker. The trust is now called the Ortu Federation and the school is sponsored by it. and in 2024 The school was acquired by Mossbourne Federation who brought the Ortu Federation schools and was rebranded to its current name Mossbourne Fobbing Academy.

Ortu Gable Hall School offers GCSEs and BTECs as programmes of study for pupils, while students in the sixth form have the option to study from a range of A Levels and further BTECs. Since 2002 the school has been a specialist arts college (performing arts) and was previously an applied learning college from 2007.

== Controversies ==
In April 2017, Peter Goldsmith, a former teacher at Gable Hall and Westcliff High School for Boys, admitted to downloading child abuse images. He pled guilty to three charges in exchange for avoiding jail time. Principal Sophina Asong made a statement in response in which it was reassured that the school knew there were "no direct links to any of our students" and that it had been "working closely with the Local Authority Safeguarding Officer for Thurrock to ensure that provision is available to support our students and parents should any specific safeguarding concerns regarding this individual emerge at this point."

In September 2021 a social media post about a teacher at the school allegedly calling Year 11 students "retards", "cowards" and "chicken sh**s" in an assembly went viral. Principal Ceril Evans stated that "It has come to my attention that a member of my teaching staff has made derogatory comments to the cohort of Year 11 students. As a school, we do not tolerate or accept such behaviour." The teacher was then suspended, pending an investigation. In response, some parents and ex-pupils came to the teacher's defence and campaigned for his reinstatement. The students who reported him were called "snowflakes" and "push buttons" and the teacher's suspension was lifted later that week.

== Ortu Sixth Form Centre Stanford & Corringham ==
The Ortu Sixth Form Centre Stanford & Corringham is an extension of Ortu Gable Hall School and it provides further education for 16-19 year olds. In Gable Hall's 2018 Ofsted inspection the sixth form was rated as Good. Students are able to apply for A-Levels, T-Levels and BTECs in a variety of subjects each categorised under five different "blocks". A-Level applications require no less than three courses and these courses must not be from the same blocks. From 2022 the sixth form will offer a level 3 BTEC in E-Sports.

The sixth form's motto is "Working Together To Ensure Success". According to a 2019 report, the institution maintained a 100% student pass rate for more than four consecutive years. Reported examination results indicated that 98% of students achieved at least two A-Level passes, while 86% obtained three or more passes at grades A*–E. Fifteen subject areas also recorded a 100% pass rate. The sixth form's website identified Ms. Sue Weston as its director.

== Notable former pupils ==
- Renei Batlokwa, footballer
- Danny Crates, former athlete
- Matt Garvey, rugby player
- Perri Kiely, Member of dance group Diversity
- Joss Labadie, footballer
- Ruti Olajugbagbe, singer and The Voice UK series 7 winner
- Jack Plom, cricketer
- Dougie Poynter, Member of pop-rock band McFly
- Emily Scott, rugby player
- Michael Stanley, rugby player

== Headteachers ==
- Les Jones (1980–1993/1994)
- John King OBE (1993/1994–2011)
- Sophina Asong (2011–2017)
- Clive Stokes (2017-2018)
- Ceri Evans (2018–2022)
- Gary Lewis (2022- 2024)
- Sam Cooper (2024–Present)

J Emsell 1960 -1966+
