= Sam Stanley (rugby union) =

British rugby union player

Sam Stanley (born 8 November 1991) is a British rugby union player. He played rugby sevens for England during the 2013/14 and 2014/15 World Rugby Sevens Series. At club level, he previously played for Saracens F.C. (2010–2014) and the Bedford Blues (2011–2014). In 2015, he signed with the Ealing Trailfinders. He can play at centre or fly-half.

== Personal life ==
Stanley comes from a rugby playing family. His brother is Michael Stanley, who plays for Samoa, and his uncle is Joe Stanley, who played rugby for New Zealand.

In August 2015, Stanley became the first English rugby union player to come out as gay. In 2017, he announced his engagement to his long term boyfriend, (Laurence Hicks): they had met seven years previously on a dating website.
