= Powerday =

Recycling and waste management firm

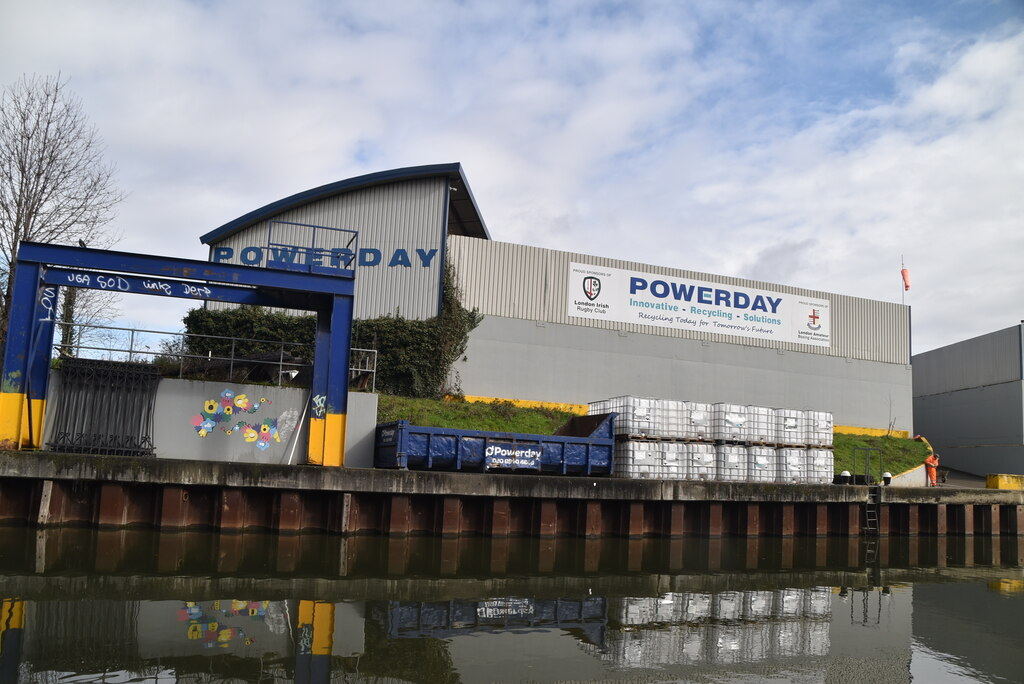
- Premises in London
- Company type: Public limited company
- Headquarters: United Kingdom
- Owner: Mick Crossan
- Website: powerday.co.uk

Powerday is a London based recycling and waste management firm. Mick Crossan owns 85% of the company. They are the current sponsors of the London Irish rugby club. Crossan is also the majority shareholder and club president of the rugby club. They are also the current sponsors of Enfield Town FC.

In 2010, Powerday were awarded the waste contract for Heathrow Airport. They have handled 87,000 tonnes of waste from the site and in 2015, the contract was renewed.

In 2015, they invested £10 million into a new material recovery facility (MRF) in Enfield, London. In 2017, they exported 170,000 tonnes of refuse-derived fuel (RDF) to energy company, Geminor in Sweden. The unusable plastic waste goes to valuable fuel to power Stockholm.

Powerday and I-recycle provide a commercial waste service by water transportation.

== Foundation ==
Powerday support local communities through the Powerday Foundation. They support local communities including youth boxing. Mick Crossan is the Dale Youth boxing club president, he funded and organised the rebuild of the boxing club which was destroyed in the Grenfell Tower fire. The club is now located on Ladbroke Grove. The rebuild was featured on the BBC Television programme DIY SOS.

Powerday have also helped ex-offenders into employment. As of 2019, it sponsored London Irish rugby club.
