= Matt Garvey =

English rugby union player

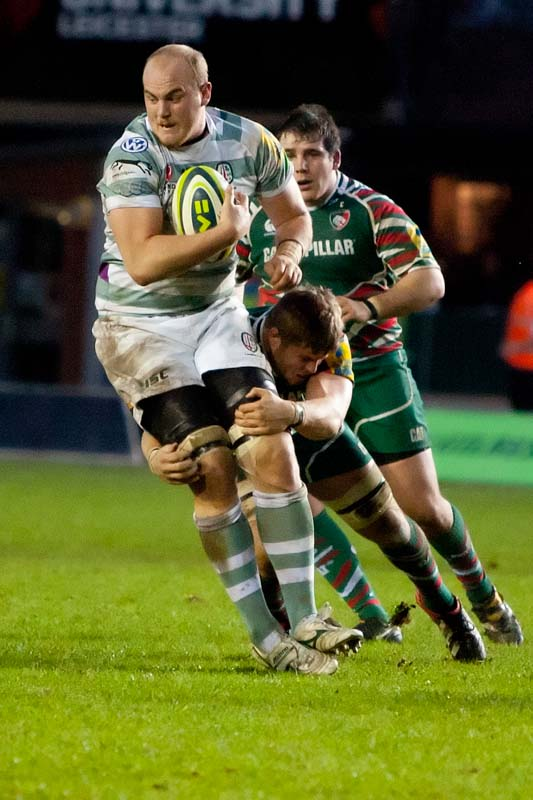
- Born: 23 October 1987 (age 39) Thurrock, England
- Height: 198 cm (6 ft 6 in)
- Weight: 125 kg (19 st 10 lb)

Rugby union career
- Position: Lock / Flanker
Senior career
Years	Team	Apps	(Points)
2009–2013	London Irish	85	(25)
2013−2020	Bath	94	(30)
2020–2021	Gloucester	17	(5)
2021–2022	Worcester Warriors	(12)	
- Correct as of 25 February 2022
International career
Years	Team	Apps	(Points)
	England Saxons	1	(0)

Matt Garvey (born 23 October 1987) is an English former rugby union player. He attended Ortu Gable Hall School completing his secondary school education there. He played as a second row who could also play in the back row. He played for London Irish, Bath, Gloucester and Worcester Warriors as well as representing the England Saxons team. He was appointed Bath captain by Todd Blackadder ahead of the 2017/18 season.

In May 2022, he announced his retirement from rugby before being appointed to work at the Rugby Players Association in July 2022 as a Player Development Manager. He changed clubs in the summer of 2024, so is currently Player Development Manager for Bath and Gloucester.
