= London Irish =

Professional English rugby union club

- Full name: London Irish Rugby Football Club
- Union: Middlesex RFU, Surrey RFU, Irish RFU
- Nickname(s): The Exiles, The Drummers
- Founded: 1898; 128 years ago
- Chairman: Daniel McKeown
- CEO: Kyle Jordan
- Most appearances: Topsy Ojo (301)
- Top scorer: Barry Everitt (1,234)
- Most tries: Topsy Ojo (46)
- 2022–23: Premiership, 5th
Home kit	Away kit

Official website
- www.londonirishrugby.club

London Irish RFC is a professional rugby union club that most recently competed in the Premiership, the top division of rugby union in England. The club also participated in the European Champions Cup, and the European Challenge Cup. While competing in the RFU Championship, the second tier of English rugby, during the 2016–17 and 2018–19 seasons, London Irish also took part in the British and Irish Cup and the RFU Championship Cup. For twenty years, the club played its home games at the Madejski Stadium in Reading, Berkshire, before relocating to the Brentford Community Stadium in Brentford, West London, for the 2020–21 season.

The club was founded in 1898 following the creation of London Scottish and London Welsh for the same reason, allowing Irishmen the chance to play rugby with fellow countrymen in the English capital.They won their only major trophy, the Powergen Cup, in 2002 and reached the 2009 Premiership final, narrowly losing 10–9 to Leicester Tigers. In the 2007–08 season, the team came close to a place in the Heineken Cup Final, losing out to Stade Toulousain 15–21 in the semi-final.

In the 2022/23 season, a buyout of the club missed crucial deadlines multiple times, forcing uncertainty within the club. To avoid suspension from the Premiership, the RFU issued an ultimatum to the club to provide financial assurances that they could continue paying players and staff with the proposed takeover to follow imminently. London Irish missed this deadline and were consequently excluded from competing in the 2023/24 season - not only in the Premiership but in all professional tiers of Rugby Union in England. After a number of moribund years, the club exited administration on 12 February 2025 when it was purchased by a consortium led by Irish former Formula One owner, Eddie Jordan.

== History ==
=== Formation and early years (1898-1915) ===
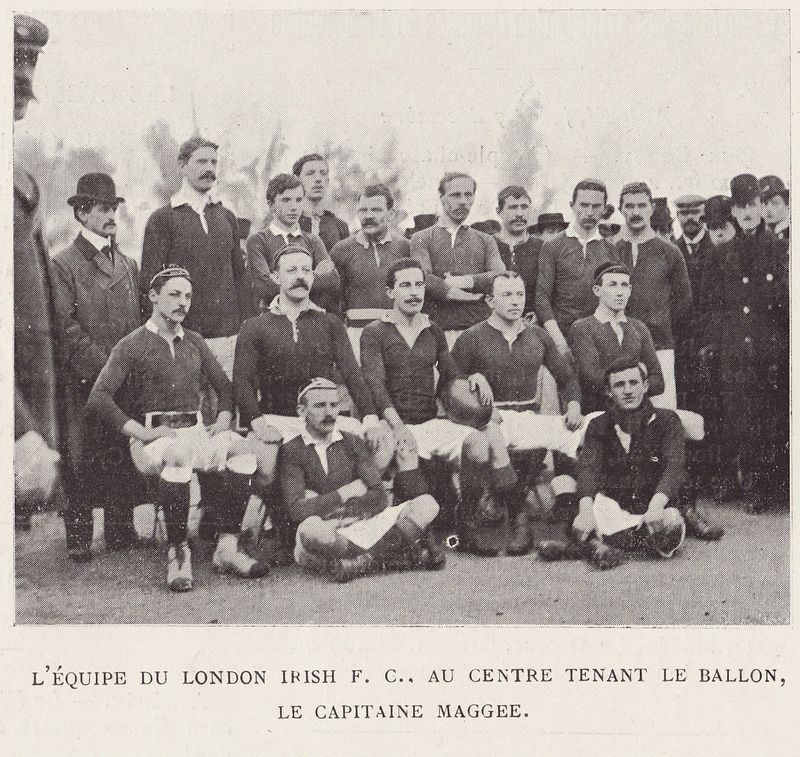
The squad that played Racing Club de France at Parc des Princes in 1899.

As the 19th century drew to a close, there was a growing consensus on both sides of the Irish Sea that a sporting club for Irishmen in London was badly needed. The inspiration came partly from London Scottish, founded in 1878, and London Welsh, founded in 1885, which had each given their own communities a home away from home in the capital. In 1898, a group of politicians, lawyers and businessmen united by a shared Irish identity came together to form the London Irish Rugby Football Club. From the outset, the club was intended as a welcoming meeting place for all Irish people in London, regardless of creed or politics. Early fortunes on the pitch owed a great deal to the arrival of veterinary surgeon Louis Magee, a leading Irish international who represented Ireland 27 times at out-half between 1895 and 1904. Alongside club captain R.S. Dyas, Magee helped secure regular fixtures against the leading London clubs of the era, including Blackheath, Rosslyn Park, Saracens and Wasps. The first game was played on 1 October 1898 against Hammersmith at Herne Hill Athletic Ground, with London Irish winning 8–3. A decade on, the club was well established, recording 15 wins and 13 defeats in their tenth anniversary season. In 1911, they travelled abroad for the first time, playing Le Havre in France, though members of the club would soon be crossing the Channel for far darker reasons.

=== War and conflict (1916-1945) ===
The turn of the new century was a great time for London Irish with the club firmly solidified in the London club roster but these would be some of the last years of normality for the team. With the commencement of World War I, many of the players enlisted with Irish Battalions in their homeland for deployment in mainland Europe. In 1916, following the Easter Rising, several remaining players and members returned to Ireland to fight in the independence struggle; many did not return. It is unknown exactly how many with a connection to the club were lost. Following the formation of the Irish Free State in 1923, some of those who fought in Europe and/or Ireland returned to the club, which saw an overhaul of the organisation over the remainder of the decade, reviving the team and its influence for a new beginning.

In the years that followed, Irish made strides in playing competition outside of Greater London with matches against teams such as Leicester and Cardiff. London Irish had produced their first home-grown Ireland international, the powerful forward S.J. 'Cags' Cagney, who won 13 caps between 1925 and 1929 and captained the side in the 1928–29 season when they did the double over the other two London exile clubs for the first time. Another prominent figure was Cecil Beamish, a son of the famous Cork brewing family, who joined in the early 1930s alongside his older brother George Beamish, who went on to captain Ireland in 1932 and later became a celebrated Battle of Britain pilot. This, however, was short-lived with the commencement of World War II and players and members again being dispersed across the continent, many of whom elected not to return following the end of the war. Nine of the players who participated in the 1938–39 season died in the conflict. The club's ground in Sunbury-on-Thames was requisitioned by the Ministry for Agriculture to grow food for the war-torn capital. Because of the state of the playing field after the war, games were temporarily held at Rectory Field in Blackheath.

=== Post-war years (1946-1979) ===
The post-war era got off to a difficult start. With many former members not returning to London, fielding a consistent XV was a challenge, and the brutal Winter of 1946 saw Rectory Field frozen for much of the season, meaning Irish had to forfeit matches. Things improved with the arrival of new captain Des O'Brien, one of the great back-row forwards of his generation and later manager of the 1966 Lions tour to Australia and New Zealand. In 1948, on the club's 50th anniversary, the first XV recorded their most successful season to date, winning 19 and drawing two of thirty games. Four players that season, Kevin O'Flanagan, Jim Corcoran, John Daly and Des O'Brien himself, represented Ireland in the Five Nations.

Through the 1950s, the club thrived, fielding six teams most weeks. In 1951, London Irish became the first club in Britain to host a touring Italian side when Roma visited Rectory Field. A young Andrew Mulligan joined in 1952–53 aged just 16, going on to represent Cambridge, Ireland, the Lions and the Barbarians. Robin Thompson captained the Lions to South Africa in 1955, while Tony O'Reilly was also making his name in green and white during this period.

After years at Rectory Field, a fundraising drive was launched to redevelop the Sunbury ground, and on 9 September 1959, the new facilities at The Avenue were officially opened. That first season back was a record-breaking one as London Irish went unbeaten. The 1960s brought mixed results, though the likes of Mike Gibson, Tony O'Reilly and Ollie Waldron continued to grace the Sunbury pitch. Under the leadership of hooker Ken Kennedy in the 1970s, with the support of players like Mick Molloy and Barry Bresnihan, the club became a genuine force once more. They finished first in the London Division of the RFU in 1976–77, and in 1977 made history in South Africa by becoming the first touring side to play a host of mixed-race teams.

=== Road to professionalism (1980–1995) ===
The introduction of the John Smith's Merit Tables in 1985–86 brought a more competitive structure to English club rugby. Despite the arrival of outstanding internationals including Hugo MacNeill, Brian McCall, Brian Spillane and Brendan Mullin, Irish struggled for form and spent much of the late 1980s in the lower reaches of Division Two. Mullin, who earned 57 Ireland caps and toured with the 1989 British and Irish Lions, was among the most distinguished players of the era to pull on the green and white jersey. In 1990–91, the club won promotion to the First Division with a squad containing four new Ireland internationals: Simon Geoghegan, Jim Staples, David Curtis and Rob Saunders, the youngest ever Ireland captain at 22. Geoghegan quickly became one of the most exciting players in English club rugby, a wing of extraordinary pace who had scored on debut for the club as a teenager. Commentator Bill McLaren famously described him as "like Bambi on speed". Operating losses mounted through the early 1990s, and the club's survival owed much to the generosity of key benefactors. When the RFU announced plans to move towards full professionalism, London Irish accepted the challenge. In 1995–96, they won promotion alongside Northampton to a new 12-team top flight, just as rugby union turned professional in August 1995.

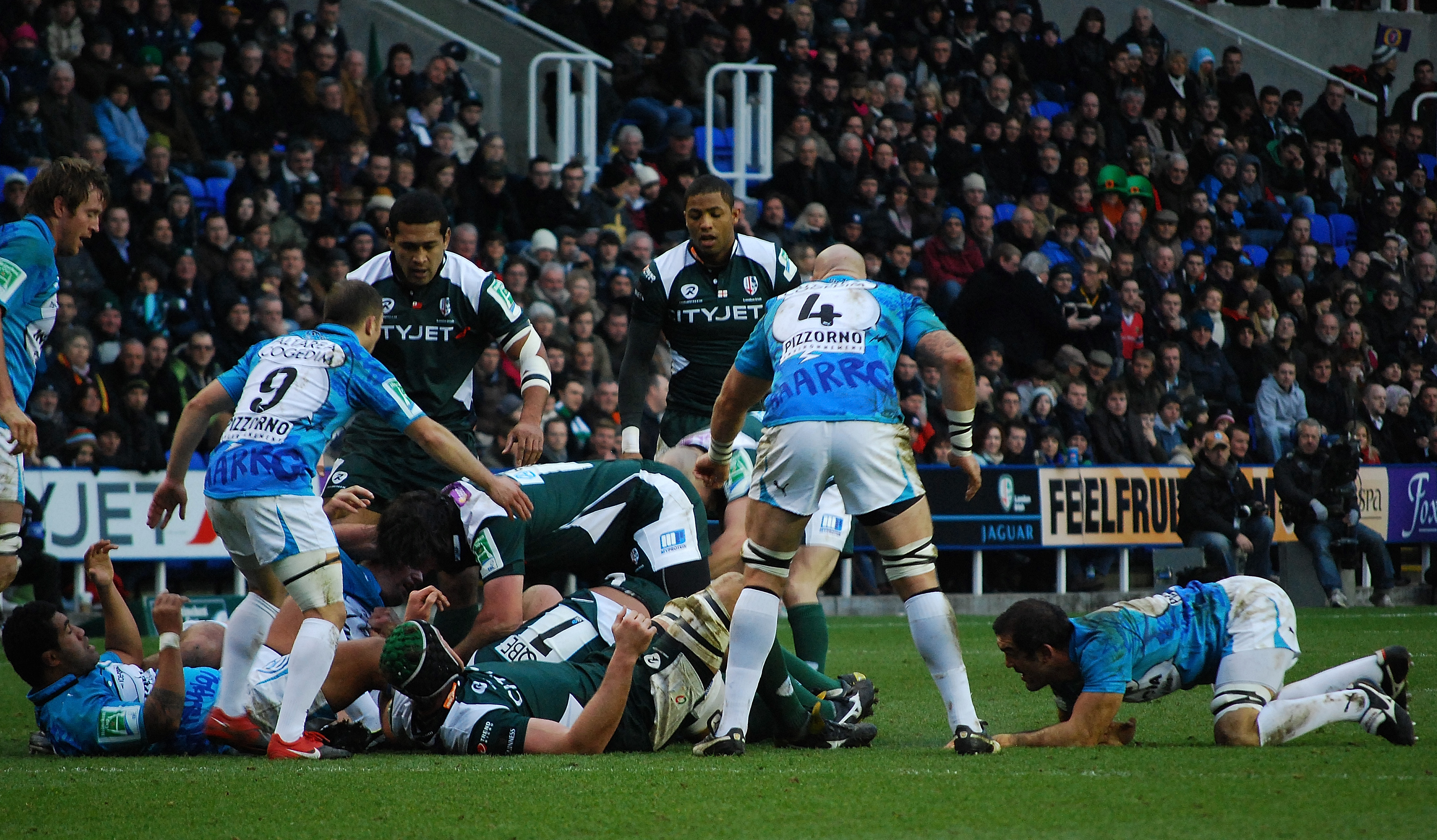
London Irish vs Toulon in 2010.

=== Professional era (1995-2022) ===
Conor O'Shea, who joined from Lansdowne in 1995, was central to the club's early professional years as both player and captain. He guided London Irish to promotion in his first season, captained the side to the top of their European Challenge Cup table in 1999 and was named Zurich Players' Player of the Season that year. In 2000, the club relocated from the Twickenham Stoop to the Madejski Stadium in Reading. The 2001–02 season produced the greatest day in the club's professional history. Written off before a ball was kicked, the Exiles went on to finish fourth in the Premiership, qualify for the Heineken Cup and win the Powergen Cup with a 38–7 victory over Northampton. Justin Bishop scored two tries, Barry Everitt kicked 13 points and 75,000 supporters packed Twickenham. Player-coach Brendan Venter was widely credited with transforming the squad that season. London Irish then reached the European Challenge Cup final in 2005–06, losing 36–34 to Gloucester. Under director of rugby Brian Smith, who arrived in 2005, the team developed a more attacking brand of rugby and in 2007–08 reached the Heineken Cup semi-finals for the first time, before falling to Toulouse 21–15. After Smith's departure, head coach Toby Booth led the club to a Premiership final in 2009, where they lost 10–9 to Leicester Tigers.

The years following the 2009 Premiership final proved to be a slow decline for London Irish. Brian Smith returned to the club as director of rugby in March 2012 for a second spell, but was dealt a difficult hand as the squad that had taken the club to its peak began to break apart. Alex Corbisiero, one of the most dominant scrummagers in the Premiership at the time, departed for Northampton Saints in the summer of 2013 after stalling on a new contract, with Smith publicly admitting he did not know whether the prop would stay. Jonathan Joseph followed him out of the door, joining Bath, alongside Matt Garvey and a number of other senior players. Anthony Watson, who had come through the academy alongside Joseph, also left for Bath shortly afterwards. The core of the squad that had been built up dissipated, leaving a few die-hard older heads, expensive international imports and a host of untested youngsters. Results suffered badly as a consequence.

In December 2013, Mick Crossan led a consortium of London-based Irish businessmen in acquiring a majority stake in London Irish, marking a significant change in the club's ownership structure. Crossan, the executive chairman of Powerday, which had been a long-term sponsor of the club, assumed the role of club president following the takeover. The purchase, reportedly valued at around £2.5 million, came at a time when London Irish were experiencing financial difficulties and declining on-field performance, prompting existing shareholders to sell after the disposal of the club's Sunbury ground. The new ownership group committed further investment to stabilise the club and develop its infrastructure, including the establishment of a new training centre at Hazelwood Training Ground, alongside efforts to strengthen the playing squad and academy system. In the 2013–14 Season, London Irish finished tenth in the Premiership, winning only seven of their 22 league games. Smith departed the club mid-season in 2015 for family reasons, with forwards coach Glenn Delaney taking interim charge. New Zealander Tom Coventry came in as head coach ahead of the 2015–16 season, but was unable to arrest the slide. It was also during this period, in March 2016, that London Irish had made history by hosting the first Premiership fixture ever played outside England, taking on Saracens at the Red Bull Arena in Harrison, New Jersey. London Irish were designated the home side for the occasion, with the match timed to coincide with St Patrick's Day weekend in a bid to draw on the substantial Irish diaspora community across the greater New York area. The fixture was part of a broader strategy by Premiership Rugby to expand the competition's commercial footprint into the United States, a market that had seen growing interest in rugby union following its return to the 2016 Olympic Games and the launch of NBC's domestic Premiership coverage. Chief executive Mark McCafferty described it as "a significant day" in the competition's history, with "ambitious plans to grow the game in the States". A crowd of 14,800 attended the match at the 25,000-capacity arena, with Saracens winning 26–16. The overseas experiment continued the following season when Newcastle Falcons hosted Saracens in Philadelphia, though that fixture attracted significantly smaller crowds, and the initiative was not continued beyond those two editions. London Irish were relegated at the end of that season, finishing bottom of the table. It was the second time in the club's history that they had been relegated from the top flight.

Rather than dwell on the drop, the team threw themselves into the 2016–17 RFU Championship with clear intent. They ran out champions of the division, with fly-half Tommy Bell finishing as the competition's leading points scorer on 253. It was former club stalwart Nick Kennedy, now in the director of rugby role, who oversaw a largely dominant campaign. The promotion, though welcome, proved short-lived: back in the Premiership for 2017–18, London Irish managed only three wins in their first 20 games and were relegated again. Kennedy stepped down during the campaign, and his replacement was a high-profile appointment: Declan Kidney, the former Ireland and Munster head coach who had led his country to the Six Nations Grand Slam in 2009, took on the director of rugby role, with his former Ireland colleague Les Kiss coming in alongside him as head coach. Kidney spoke candidly about the scale of the rebuilding job ahead, acknowledging that restoring London Irish to the upper reaches of the Premiership would require sustained investment and patience over a number of years. A second successive Championship season in 2018–19 went significantly better. London Irish won the title again, defeating Richmond 46–7 in the final to win promotion at the first attempt for the second time in three years. Alongside the promotion, the club confirmed what many supporters had long hoped for: they would be leaving Reading behind and returning to London, having agreed a long-term groundshare with Brentford FC at the club's brand new stadium.

London Irish returned to the Premiership for the 2019–20 Season as Championship winners, but the campaign was defined far more by events off the pitch than on it. The season was suspended in March 2020 following government guidance on mass gatherings due to the COVID-19 pandemic, with the restart eventually taking place in August, all matches played behind closed doors. The enforced five-month break created an additional problem for London Irish specifically: their tenancy at the Madejski Stadium had expired during the hiatus, and the new Brentford Community Stadium was also delayed by the pandemic, leaving the club temporarily without a ground. Harlequins stepped in, allowing London Irish to complete their remaining fixtures at the Twickenham Stoop. While the playing side was in limbo, the club threw its energy into the community. Working alongside their principal sponsor Powerday, London Irish launched the "Powering the NHS" initiative, using the kitchens and staff at the Hazelwood training centre to prepare hot meals for frontline NHS workers at hospitals across Greater London, including St Bartholomew's, Ealing and the Royal London with similar drop-offs made in the home counties. Players, coaches and backroom staff volunteered their time during the shutdown to help prepare and deliver the meals, with Powerday vehicles used to transport them across the capital. The club also collected and distributed personal protective equipment (PPE) to vulnerable residents across the Borough of Spelthorne. By the time the initiative wound down in June 2020, more than 50,000 meals had been delivered, with the final batch prepared with the personal involvement of Prince Edward and the Countess of Wessex, who joined staff at Hazelwood to mark the conclusion of the project. The season was eventually seen out in empty stadiums, with the Exiles finishing ninth. The following campaign, their first officially at the new Brentford ground, was played entirely without supporters due to continuing restrictions, and was further disrupted by COVID-19 outbreaks within the squad that forced the cancellation of several fixtures, including the Boxing Day trip to Bath and a final-day match at Bristol. Two consecutive seasons without a crowd made it difficult to build any real identity at the new ground, and it was not until supporters were allowed back in for 2021–22 that London Irish were finally able to settle into their new West London home. Since fans were not allowed to watch the fixtures in-person, Irish elected to reuse the same BLK Jerseys from the 2020 season.

=== Administration and Suspension (2023) ===
In December 2022, an American consortium called NUE Equity approached Powerday (Irish's parent company) with interest in acquiring London Irish. Initially, the group approached Saracens, who later ceased negotiations following legal advice over the lack of financial evidence to support the club going forward. An exclusivity agreement with Powerday was reached, and the club submitted a business plan to the RFU projecting profitability within five years, with ambitions to grow across Irish-American communities in cities such as New York, Boston and Chicago. There were also talks with AFC Wimbledon about potentially moving to Plough Lane, joining Rugby League side London Broncos. Sources said that the consortium would look to pledge around £7 million to upgrade the stadium, especially considering that the club had a smaller capacity than Brentford and would be under the Minimum Standards Criteria required by the RFU. Crossan also agreed not to invest further personal funds for the remainder of the 2022-23 Season, confident the takeover would be completed by April 2023.

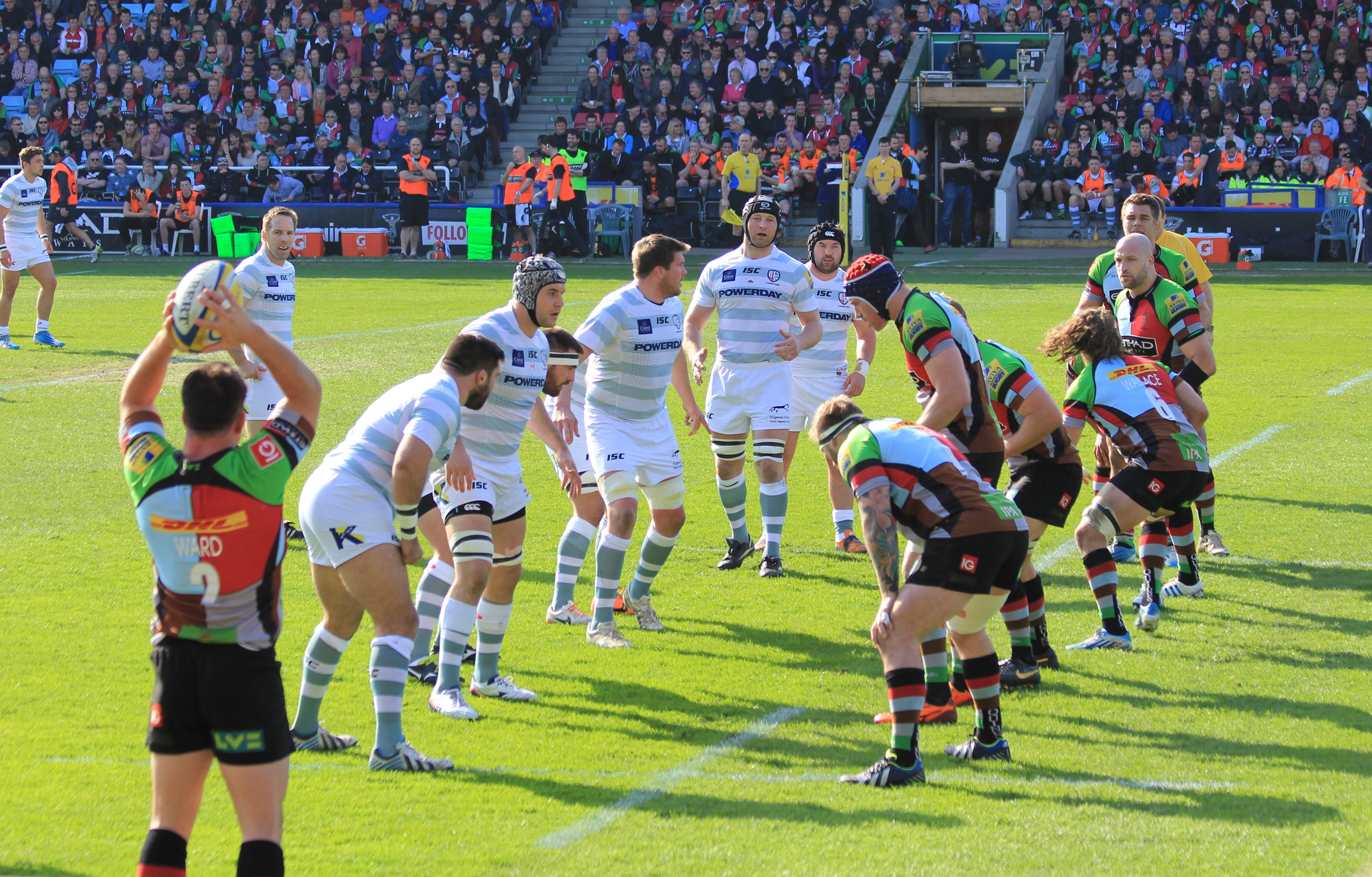
London Irish vs Harlequins, their West London Rivals.

In early May 2023, The Times reported that the club had failed to pay April wages. Questions were raised about the integrity of the takeover during meetings between members of London Irish's executive team and the RFU's Financial Viability Board. As the squad prepared for the final game of the season against Exeter Chiefs, players held emergency discussions with the Rugby Players' Association over concerns regarding their unpaid medical insurance, which would leave them without coverage if injured during the match. The players also drafted breach-of-contract letters, ready to submit if payroll and medical insurance were not resolved. Premiership Rugby intervened, offering to cover medical insurance for that match, but could not address salary issues. Minutes before a player-set deadline, Crossan confirmed April payroll would be covered. The consortium attributed delays to legal red tape. The club finished fifth, their best result since 2009, though the mood around the club remained deeply uncertain. Subsequently, it was revealed that NUE Equity had submitted little to no formal documentation to the RFU throughout this time period, raising serious questions about the consortium's credibility and the due diligence applied to the proposed transaction.

Under pressure to complete the sale, Premiership Rugby issued an ultimatum requiring the takeover to be completed by May 30th or the club would face suspension from the 2023–24 season. Upon the request of Crossan and then CEO Adrian Alli, the RFU granted a one-week extension, conditional on Powerday covering May payroll (which had also not been paid to staff) in full and the consortium providing proof of financial stability. Although these conditions were initially agreed upon, Crossan later reduced his commitment to only covering 50% of staff payroll. London Irish captain Matt Rogerson took a leading role in negotiations, emphasising the toll this uncertainty had on players and staff.

On 2 June 2023, HM Revenue and Customs (HMRC) issued a winding-up petition over an unpaid tax bill of around £1 million, believed to relate to COVID-19 pandemic loans.

The second deadline for the sale passed without progress. With players and staff in limbo, a virtual meeting took place before the 16:00 deadline, during which the RFU confirmed the club's suspension from the Premiership. Staff had only received 50% of their payroll, with no updates on the remaining wages. Following the failed takeover bid by the American-based consortium and Crossan's refusal to fund the club further, London Irish was placed into administration on June 7th, 2023. All staff and players were made redundant, and the club offices and shop were closed indefinitely. However, London Irish's charity foundation continues to operate, hosting fundraisers and events in West London. The Hazelwood Centre remains open for venue hire, and Gael Londain and London Irish Wild Geese use the grounds for matches. In an open letter, Crossan said he had acted throughout in good faith on repeated assurances that the money was imminent but acknowledged it was "not feasible to continue absorbing the multi-million-pound losses of the club each year, indefinitely". London Irish became the third top-flight club to collapse within a single season, following Worcester Warriors and Wasps. In the aftermath of the collapse, the RFU intervened to cover the remaining 50% of outstanding wages owed to London Irish staff, extending financial support for up to three months to provide players and employees with some stability as they sought employment elsewhere.

=== Post-administration era (2024–present) ===
With the club in the hands of administrator ReSolve Group, its future remained uncertain for the best part of two years. The first serious revival attempt came in April 2024 from Daniel Thomas Loitz, a German businessman and director of investment firm Hokulani Limited. By October, Hokulani had been named preferred bidder by ReSolve, with Loitz submitting an expression of interest to the RFU to enter London Irish into the Championship for 2025–26. He spoke with London-based newspaper City A.M. about his intentions to revive the club through a buyout. The deal ultimately collapsed. Hokulani withdrew, stating that "the parameters of the deal were subject to frequent and unexplained changes". In a personal statement, Loitz and business partner Ronny de Bot said it was "painful to witness the potential erosion of a club with such a rich history and passionate supporter base".

In October 2024, Irish businessman and former Formula One team owner Eddie Jordan, alongside former New Zealand international Andrew Mehrtens and former South Africa international Bobby Skinstad, were reported to be forming a consortium to buy London Irish. In February 2025, their vehicle Strangford Ellis Ltd completed the purchase of the club's intellectual property, brand and rights as part of a wider project to emulate the success of the City Football Group. When Strangford Ellis Ltd completed the purchase of the club, the former training facility at Hazelwood Centre was not included in the transaction and remained a separate asset under the administration process. The consortium outlined plans to return to competitive rugby by Late 2026, introduce a women's team, reinstate the academy and implement a fan ownership model. Tragically, Jordan died in Cape Town on 20 March 2025 from aggressive prostate cancer, aged 76, just weeks after completing the takeover. His son, Kyle Jordan, assumed the role of interim chief executive, stating: "We are on track to return to competitive rugby by September 2026 and nothing has changed in that pursuit".

The question of which competition London Irish will enter has proven complex. The club missed the window to join the expanded Championship for 2025–26 and also explored joining the United Rugby Championship. The RFU initially indicated it would block such a move, though legal precedent established in cases relating to football's European Super League suggested the RFU may lack the authority to do so. As of April 2026, both routes remain under consideration. The club has launched a season ticket waiting list and confirmed its 2026 return, with supporters invited to pre-register ahead of the Exiles' first competitive matches in over three years.

In October 2026, with owner Eddie Jordan having passed away the previous year, the club was sold to energy entrepreneur Steve Daniels.

== Academy ==
London Irish's academy was widely regarded as one of the most productive in English club rugby during the professional era, with a particular reputation for identifying and developing young back-line talent before moving them into the senior game. The club's catchment area in West London and its coaching structure earned consistent praise from those who passed through it. Among the most notable products of the academy in its earlier years were Alex Corbisiero, Jonathan Joseph and Anthony Watson. Corbisiero joined the academy in 2005 and made his professional debut for London Irish in 2008, going on to make 115 appearances for the club before his international career took off. He was selected for the British & Irish Lions 2013 tour of Australia, becoming one of the most respected loosehead props of his generation. Joseph came through the academy and made his senior debut for London Irish in 2009, later earning 65 England caps and a Lions call-up in 2017, while Watson, who grew up playing alongside Joseph, also graduated from the same academy system before going on to represent England and the Lions. His brother Marcus Watson also came through the London Irish academy before going on to represent England Sevens and win a silver medal at the 2016 Rio Olympics. Topsy Ojo, though not strictly an academy graduate, became the definitive London Irish player of the professional era, making a club-record 301 appearances over 14 seasons and scoring 46 tries.

Henry Arundell joined the London Irish academy at the age of 14 while attending Harrow School. He was part of the London Irish under-18s side that won the Under-18 Academy League title. Arundell made his senior debut in the 2021–22 season, going on to make 14 appearances and score seven tries. He made his England senior debut in July 2022, scoring with his first touch in international rugby against Australia, and went on to equal an England record by scoring five tries in a single match at the 2023 Rugby World Cup, against Chile. Chandler Cunningham-South arrived at the London Irish academy in February 2022, having moved back to England from New Zealand, where he had grown up from the age of four and developed as a player through North Harbour under-18s and Canterbury under-19s. He made his senior debut for London Irish against Bath in May 2022 and went on to make 25 first-team appearances in the 2022–23 season, including a Try of the Season effort against Saracens. He also represented England under-20s in the Six Nations that year.

The academy also produced Ben Loader, Ollie Hassell-Collins and Tom Parton, all of whom were part of England's squad that reached the final of the World Rugby Under-20 Championship, along with brothers Delon and Guy Armitage, Shane Geraghty, Tom Homer, Nick Kennedy and Marland Yarde, all of whom were capped for England during their time at the club.

Following the administration of the club in 2023, the RFU subsumed the Academy and renamed it London & South Central Academy. However, in April 2024, the decision was made to close this academy following redistricting under a new Professional Game Partnership agreement.

== Facilities ==
=== Brentford Community Stadium ===
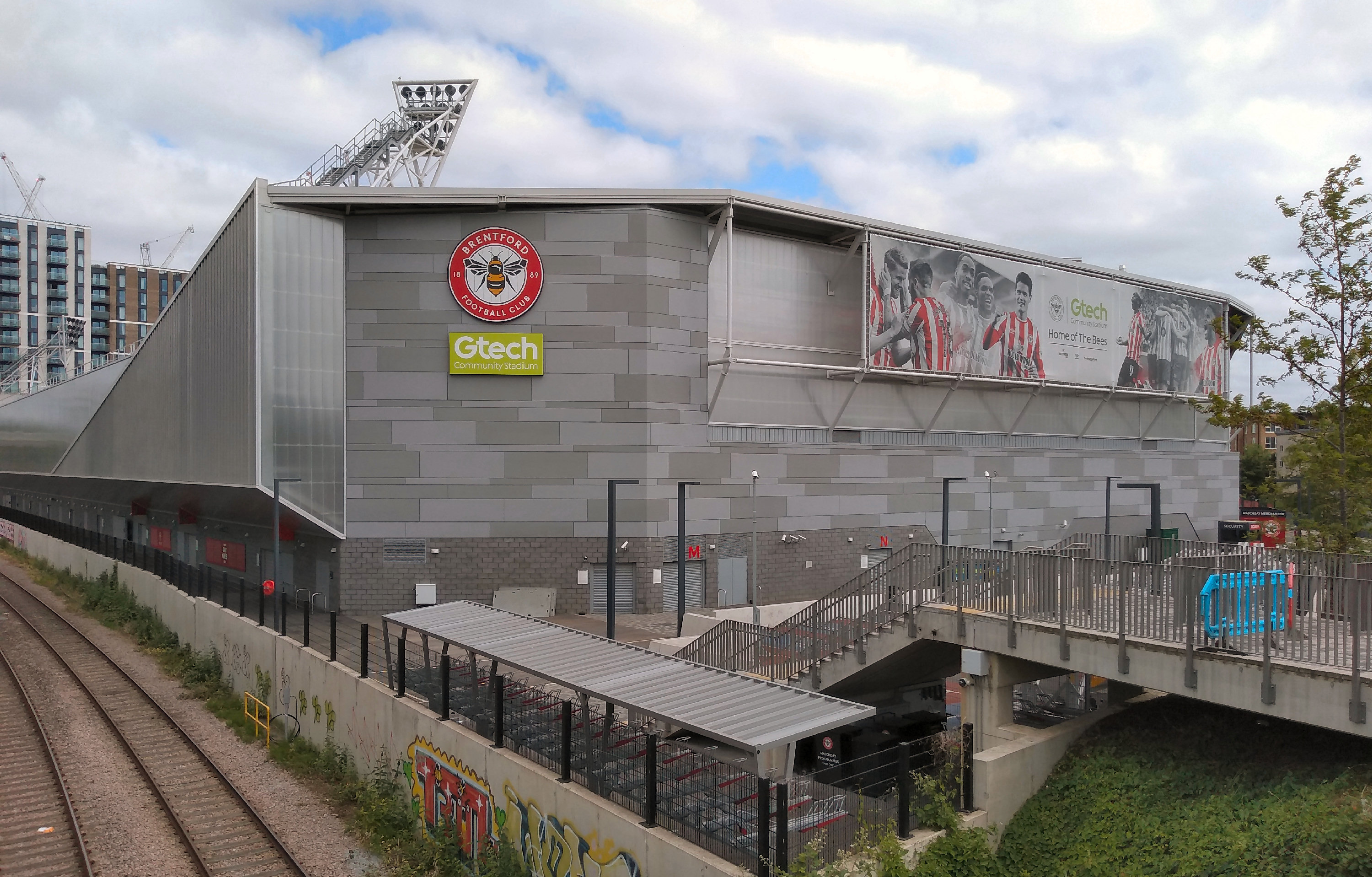
Gtech Community Stadium from Lionel Road South.

London Irish's long-anticipated return to West London was formalised in 2018 when the club confirmed it would take up a groundshare at Brentford FC's new stadium on Lionel Road in Brentford. The agreement had been years in the making: formal discussions with Hounslow Borough Council had begun as far back as August 2016, with Brentford FC chair Cliff Crown welcoming the arrangement and noting that the new ground had been designed from the outset to accommodate both Premier League football and Premiership rugby. Construction of the stadium had itself been subject to repeated delays, with compulsory purchase orders for sections of the Lionel Road site and the impact of the COVID-19 pandemic pushing the opening back from the originally planned 2019-20 season to the autumn of 2020. Due to delays, Irish decided to play their remaining games when possible at Harlequin's Twickenham Stoop as they could not return to Reading. The Exiles had previously played at The Stoop in the 1999–2000 season before moving to the Madejski Stadium. When London Irish did finally take up residence, they did so in an empty stadium, with public health restrictions preventing supporters from attending for the entire first season. The first Premiership match at the new ground was against Leicester Tigers.

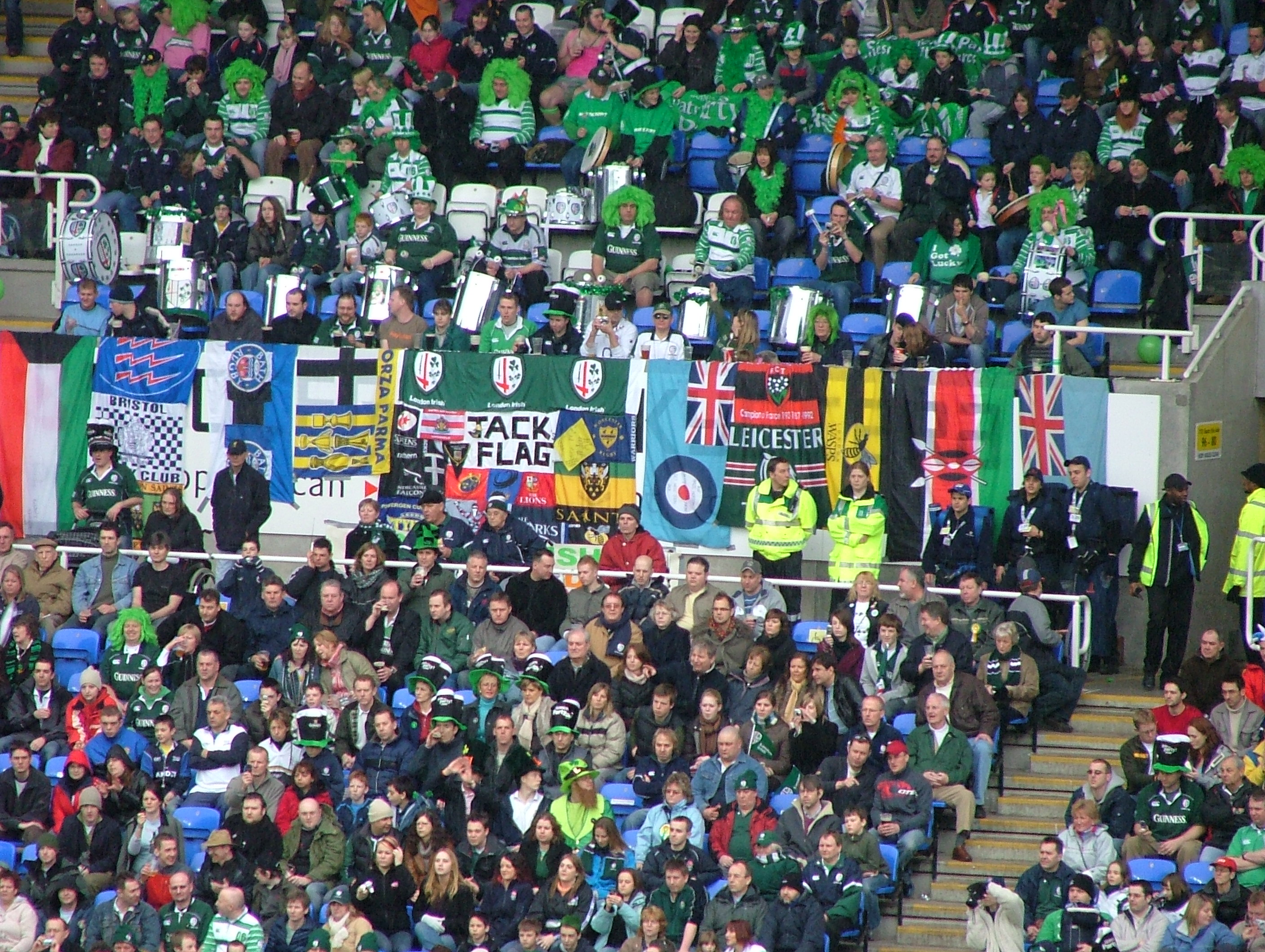
London Irish drummers and fans at the Madejski Stadium.

The stadium, with a seated capacity of 17,250 and built at a cost of £71 million, was operated by Brentford FC under a licence arrangement that gave the football club primacy of use. While the two organisations generally operated the groundshare harmoniously and with a shared community ethos, the arrangement was not without its complications. Fixture scheduling required careful coordination between the two clubs' management teams, and the shared use of the pitch occasionally generated tension. As is common with rugby and football groundshares, concerns were raised at various points about the condition of the playing surface, with the heavier physical demands of rugby union on a pitch prompting questions from some quarters about the impact on the ground ahead of Brentford football fixtures. The stadium's Desso Grassmaster hybrid pitch surface, combining natural grass with synthetic fibres, was specifically designed to withstand intensive use and went some way to mitigating those concerns, though the issue periodically resurfaced whenever fixtures from both sports fell in close proximity. For the majority of London Irish home matches, the North Stand was kept closed, with the club operating the ground at a reduced capacity that better reflected typical rugby attendances at the venue. The North Stand would only be opened for the most high-profile fixtures, most notably the annual St Patrick's Day match and local derby fixtures against Harlequins, occasions on which the club actively targeted a sellout and made a concerted effort to fill the stadium to its full 17,250 capacity. The St Patrick's Day fixture in particular became one of the standout occasions in the London rugby calendar, drawing on the club's Irish identity and diaspora support base to create an atmosphere that the stadium rarely saw for rugby. On the pitch, the return to London proved commercially significant for London Irish. Their average attendance during their final season in Reading before the pandemic was 5,832. In 2021–22, their first campaign with the turnstiles open in Brentford, London Irish registered an average of 9,370 for their 11 home league games, with four fixtures exceeding five figures, including a ground record of 15,085 for the St Patrick's Day fixture against Northampton Saints. The largest ever crowd for a London Irish home match overall remained the 23,790 recorded against London Wasps at the Madejski Stadium in March 2008, which also stood as the highest attendance for any regular-season Premiership match until December of that year.

In 2022, the club opened a standalone merchandise store at 3 Stile Hall Parade on Chiswick High Road, a short walk from the Gtech Community Stadium. The decision to open an independent shop followed a season in which London Irish had used Brentford FC's existing club store for retail operations, an arrangement that proved commercially unviable, with the cost of using Brentford's facilities outweighing the revenue generated. The Chiswick High Road store was open to the public during the week and on matchdays, also serving as a ticket office where supporters could purchase paper tickets and season cards in person. On matchdays, ticketing operations transferred to Brentford FC's official ticket office at the stadium, with the club shop reverting to its retail function for the duration of the game.

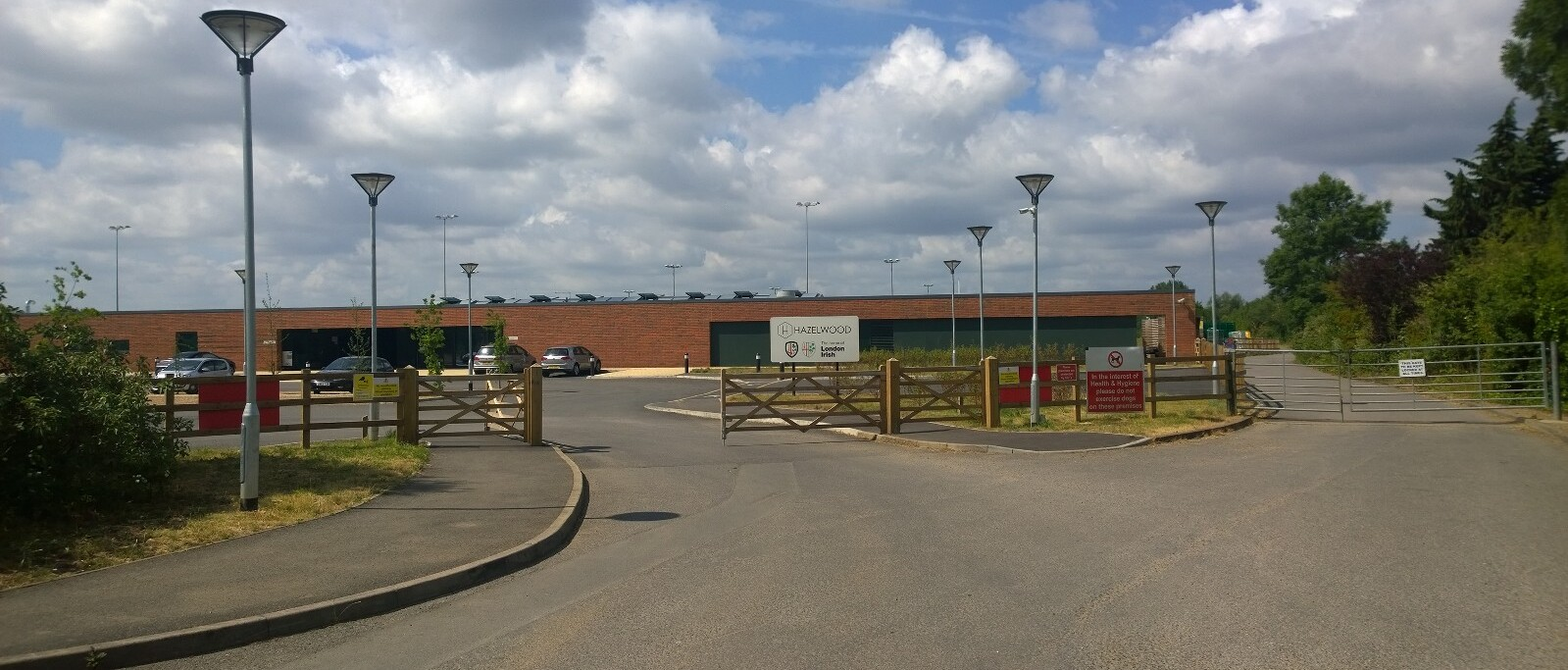
The Hazelwood Centre, The club's Training Ground and Head Offices.

When London Irish relocated to the Brentford Community Stadium in 2020, the club was mindful of the loyal supporter base it had built up across Berkshire during two decades at the Madejski Stadium. To maintain those connections, the club operated a dedicated Park and Ride service for every Premiership home game, collecting supporters from the Mereoak Park & Ride before stopping at the Madejski Stadium car park, Reading railway station and the club's Hazelwood Centre in Sunbury-on-Thames, then continuing on to Brentford. The Gtech Community Stadium's location in West London also made it well served by public transport for supporters travelling from further afield. Those coming from Reading or London Waterloo could use South Western Railway services, while GWR and Elizabeth line services from Reading and London Paddington offered connections via Ealing Broadway. Supporters travelling from within London could reach the ground via the London Overground or District line from Gunnersbury, or via the Piccadilly line with Acton Town and South Ealing, both within walking distance of the stadium. The ground was also accessible by bus, with the 65 route providing a direct link between Kingston upon Thames and Ealing, passing close to the stadium, while the 110, 237, 267 and H91 routes offered further connections towards Hammersmith. The variety of transport options made the Gtech Community Stadium one of the more accessible venues in the Premiership, and went some way to softening the blow of the move away from Reading for those supporters who had grown accustomed to the Madejski. The club worked alongside South Western Railway and Great Western Railway on matchday travel initiatives, with both operators featuring in London Irish's matchday programme and producing promotional material aimed at supporters travelling by rail from Reading and the surrounding areas. The stadium also sits adjacent to the site of Kew Bridge railway station, which is earmarked for inclusion in the proposed West London Orbital.

=== Hazelwood Centre ===
The Hazelwood Centre is a 63-acre sports facility in Sunbury-on-Thames, Surrey, built at a cost of £12 million and opened in 2014 following the closure of London Irish's previous training base at The Avenue. Purpose-built for professional rugby, the complex served as both the club's training ground and administrative headquarters, housing the club's offices alongside four full-size grass pitches, a 4G synthetic surface, a gymnasium, indoor fitness rooms, changing rooms and a licensed bar and clubhouse open to the public seven days a week. The site also served as a training base for NFL franchises visiting London as part of the NFL International Series. When London Irish entered administration in 2023, the Hazelwood Centre was not included in the subsequent purchase by Strangford Ellis Ltd and remained a separate asset.

In November 2025, rugby league club London Broncos took over the facilities, establishing Hazelwood as their training ground and administrative headquarters, with co-owner Darren Lockyer describing it as possibly the best facility available to any rugby league club in the country. The Broncos' women's team and reserve side also use the ground for home fixtures, while London Irish Amateur RFC continue to train and play there, with the site having developed into a broader community sports hub in the years since the professional club's departure.

== Controversies ==
=== The Avenue Closure ===
The relocation of London Irish's training base from The Avenue to Hazelwood Centre during the early 2010s proved controversial due to linked redevelopment plans and concerns over the loss of local green space. The proposals involved selling and redeveloping The Avenue site for housing while converting the former Hazelwood Golf Course into a modern training facility, prompting opposition from residents and local campaign groups who argued the plans would harm the character of the area and reduce protected open land. Around 500 residents took part in protest marches in 2010, calling for the preservation of The Avenue or greater community concessions. The development faced multiple planning setbacks, including initial rejection and a public inquiry in which objections centred on green belt impact and urbanisation concerns, before revised plans were eventually approved by Spelthorne Borough Council. During the dispute, local Member of Parliament Kwasi Kwarteng engaged with constituents and supported efforts to find a compromise that would retain the club in Sunbury while addressing community concerns, reflecting the broader political involvement in resolving the planning impasse. Following the approval of redevelopment plans, London Irish proceeded with the construction of the Hazelwood Centre, which opened in 2015 as a modern, purpose-built training complex. The move allowed the club to consolidate its professional and academy operations into a single high-performance environment. At the same time, The Avenue was vacated and subsequently demolished, with the land redeveloped for housing as part of the club's financial restructuring. While the new facility was widely seen as a necessary step forward, the loss of The Avenue remained contentious, with some local residents and supporters expressing disappointment over the disappearance of a historic sporting site and the broader impact on community green space.

=== Paddy Jackson signing ===
In May 2019, London Irish announced the signing of former Ireland international fly-half Paddy Jackson, who had been acquitted of rape charges in a high-profile 2018 trial. Despite his acquittal, the trial exposed explicit and derogatory messages exchanged between Jackson and others, leading to public backlash and the termination of his contract with the Irish Rugby Football Union and Ulster Rugby.

Jackson's signing sparked controversy and had immediate consequences for London Irish's sponsorship deals. Cash Converters ended their partnership, though the club stated this was unrelated to Jackson's arrival. More significantly, Diageo, the owner of Guinness, terminated its nearly 30-year sponsorship, citing concerns that the signing was "not consistent with our values".

London Irish defended their decision, expressing disappointment over Diageo's withdrawal but maintaining that Jackson had been acquitted and deserved the opportunity to continue his career. Despite losing key sponsorships, the club stood by their signing, emphasising their belief in rehabilitation and second chances. Although Jackson was integral to Irish's successes since his arrival, he was rarely featured in marketing material or interviews.

== Kit ==
London Irish have had a series of kit suppliers over the professional era, and each one roughly reflects a different stage in the club's on-field journey from established Premiership side, to relegation and Championship years, and back again before the club's suspension in 2023.

Canterbury (late 1990s–mid 2000s) were the club's main supplier during their early Premiership years. This was a fairly settled period in terms of kit identity, with Canterbury producing the classic green-and-white hooped home shirts that became strongly associated with London Irish in the early professional era. Away kits were usually simple colour reversals, and overall kit output was fairly consistent season to season, matching a more traditional approach to rugby shirts at the time.

Kooga (mid 2000s–early 2010s) followed and continued that established identity. The hooped home shirt remained central, but Kooga's era saw a bit more variation in how that was interpreted, with different panel layouts and occasional darker or more experimental away kits. It was still very recognisably "London Irish," but with a slightly more modern, performance-led feel compared to Canterbury.

ISC (2011–2014) came in during a shorter, transitional phase. Kits from this period began to feel more streamlined, with less rigid reliance on full hoops and more use of panel-based designs and simplified colour blocking. It was a relatively brief spell, but it marked a shift away from traditional styling toward a more modern rugby aesthetic that many clubs were starting to adopt.

O'Neills (2014–2017) became the next long-term supplier and is often associated with a clearer return to identity. The home kits again leaned heavily into clean green-and-white hoops, while away kits varied between white, black, and green-based alternatives. This era also became well known for the club's St Patrick's Day shirts, which were released as special editions each season. These were very popular with supporters and became strong retail sellers, often used for specific marquee fixtures rather than just general matchwear.

XBlades (2017–2019) were involved during a turbulent period for the club, including the aftermath of relegation from the Premiership in 2017. Their kits tended to feel more modern and athletic, with a slightly more aggressive look and less reliance on traditional hoop patterns. This period was relatively short, but it coincided with the club trying to rebuild and push back toward the top flight.

BLK (Beyond Limits Known) (2019–2023) supplied the club in their final major era before suspension. Their kits are probably the most visually distinctive in London Irish's history, especially the St Patrick's Day and special edition shirts, which often featured bold shamrock-based graphics and more expressive designs. The standard home and away kits still used green as the base identity, but in a much more graphic, modern way compared to earlier suppliers.

Whilst the team was suspended before any agreement was announced, the club had planned to partner with Macron on a 4-year deal until 2027. In November 2025, London Irish Foundation released a limited range with Macron to commemorate the passing of Eddie Jordan titled the "BELIEVE" range. All profits made from sales funded the Foundation and the London Irish Amateur team. It also offered a look at future kit designs upon the club's formal reactivation.

== London Irish Wild Geese ==
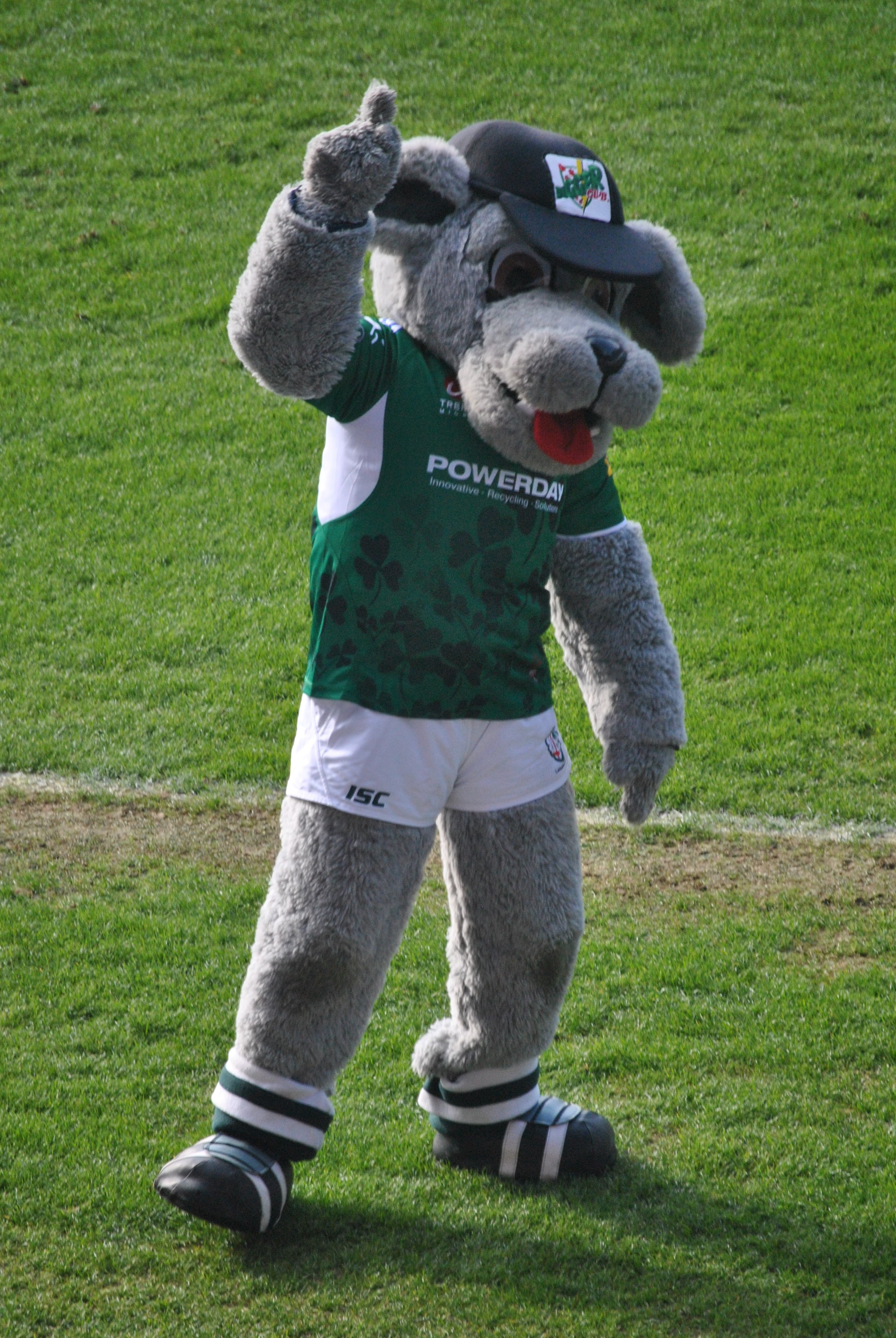
Digger

London Irish Amateur RFC is a separate legal entity founded in 1999 when the professional club turned fully professional and vacated The Avenue. The amateur club, also known as the Wild Geese, is based at Hazelwood in Sunbury and provides non-professional players the opportunity to develop their game in a competitive environment. Several players, including Justin Bishop and Kieran Campbell, came through the amateur club before going on to represent the professional side. The amateur club continues to operate independently and remains active in regional competition.

== Mascot ==
=== Digger ===
Digger is the official mascot of London Irish Rugby Club, depicted as an Irish Wolfhound. He has been a prominent figure at the club's home matches, engaging with fans and contributing to the matchday atmosphere. After a hiatus during the COVID-19 Pandemic, Digger made his first appearance at the Club's Brentford home in the 2022/23 Season.

In 2003, Digger participated in the Reading Half Marathon on March 9, completing the race in 2 hours, 11 minutes, and 41 seconds. The event aimed to raise funds and awareness for the Jarrod Cunningham SALSA Foundation. A few months later in June, the Wolfhound won the "Best Mascot" award in Zurich Premiership at the Premier Rugby Marketing Awards.

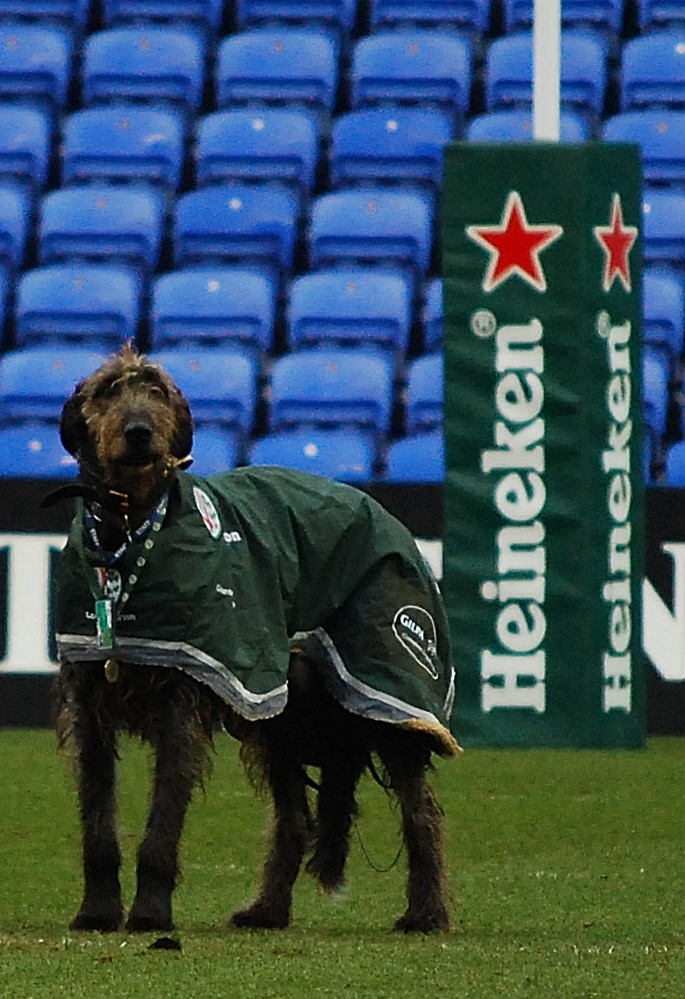
Mr Doyle

On 23 April 2006, Digger ran the London Marathon in 6 hours, 39 minutes, and 31 seconds, raising funds for spinal research. In addition, he also participated in the Bracknell Half Marathon and the Milton Keynes Half Marathon, supporting various charitable causes.

Digger also travelled with the team to various other away venues, mainly within English Premiership but not limited to the Pro12, with the gimmick that he and the home team's mascot would do a running race during the half-time period of the match.

=== Others ===
Digger was joined by his cousin, Duggie, from the 2006–07 season. Much taller and much slower, Duggie has proved popular with younger children attending matchdays. As well as the mascot characters, there was also a real Irish Wolfhound, Mr Doyle, who also attended home games at the Madejski. Before Mr Doyle, his great uncle, Jumbo, attended home games before his retirement.

== Rivalries ==
London Irish has key rivalries within the Greater London area, most notably with Harlequins and Saracens. The proximity of Gtech Community Stadium to Twickenham Stoop, less than two miles away, has made the London Irish vs Harlequins clashes highly anticipated local derbies, often selling out both stadiums respectively. Formerly, these matches were named the Cunningham Duncombe Series named after Irish fly-half Jarrod Cunningham and Harlequins scrum-half Nick Duncombe. The rivalry with Saracens also intensified since London Irish moved back to West London, establishing another significant local derby.

Additionally, London Irish maintains a friendly rivalry with London Scottish, another club with a shared history as an expatriate team. While less intense, these matches continue to be competitive and celebrated by both sides. The team has also had a rivalry with Ealing Trailfinders, whom they have battled with on numerous occasions for promotion, whilst Irish competed in the RFU Championship. Some fans also regard Wasps as a former local rival, having been based at QPR's Loftus Road in the late nineties before both clubs would eventually move out of West London.

Despite sharing West London as a home base, London Irish and Harlequins have historically drawn from distinct communities across the south of England. London Irish built much of their supporter base across Berkshire, Hampshire and parts of Surrey, areas with strong Irish diaspora communities and working-class rugby clubs that aligned with the Exiles' identity. Harlequins, by contrast, drew more heavily from Surrey, Kent and West & East Sussex, cultivating a following long associated with the more affluent commuter belt south of London. The two clubs' differing community rugby partnerships reflected this divide, with each aligned to a different network of grassroots clubs across their respective regions. The contrast in supporter demographics gave the rivalry an added dimension beyond geography, with London Irish frequently characterised as the working-class club of West London against Harlequins' more establishment image.

== Season summaries ==
	League				Domestic Cup		European Cup	
Season	Competition	Final Position	Points	Play-Offs	Competition	Performance	Competition	Performance
1987–88	Courage League Division 2	8th	24	N/A	John Player Cup	3rd round	No competition	N/A
1988–89	Courage League Division 2	6th	12	N/A	Pilkington Cup	4th round	No competition	N/A
1989–90	Courage League Division 2	5th	12	N/A	Pilkington Cup	2nd round	No competition	N/A
1990–91	Courage League Division 2	2nd (P)	19	N/A	Pilkington Cup	Quarter-final	No competition	N/A
1991–92	Courage League Division 1	9th	9	N/A	Pilkington Cup	3rd round	No competition	N/A
1992–93	Courage League Division 1	7th	12	N/A	Pilkington Cup	3rd round	No competition	N/A
1993–94	Courage League Division 1	9th (R)	8	N/A	Pilkington Cup	5th round	No competition	N/A
1994–95	Courage League Division 2	5th	18	N/A	Pilkington Cup	5th round	No competition	N/A
1995–96	Courage League Division 2	2nd (P)	30	N/A	Pilkington Cup	Semi-final	No English teams	N/A
1996–97	Courage League Division 1	10th	12	N/A	Pilkington Cup	4th round	Challenge Cup	6th in pool
1997–98	Allied Dunbar Premiership	11th	12	N/A	Tetley's Bitter Cup	Quarter-final	Challenge Cup	2nd in pool
1998–99	Allied Dunbar Premiership	7th	30	N/A	Tetley's Bitter Cup	Quarter-final	No English teams	N/A
1999–00	Allied Dunbar Premiership	8th	25	N/A	Tetley's Bitter Cup	Semi-final	Challenge Cup	Semi-final
2000–01	Zurich Premiership	8th	45	N/A	Tetley's Bitter Cup	Quarter-final	Challenge Cup	1st in pool (Note: Finished first in the pool but did not progress to the quarter-final. Their place was taken by Brive.)
2001–02	Zurich Premiership	4th	57	N/A	Powergen Cup	Champions	Challenge Cup	Semi-final
2002–03	Zurich Premiership	9th	40	–	Powergen Cup	Semi-final	Heineken Cup	2nd in pool
2003–04	Zurich Premiership	8th	49	–	Powergen Cup	Quarter-final	Challenge Cup	2nd round
2004–05	Zurich Premiership	10th	40	–	Powergen Cup	Semi-final	Challenge Cup	2nd round
2005–06	Guinness Premiership	3rd	66	Semi-final	Powergen Cup	3rd in pool	Challenge Cup	Runners-up
2006–07	Guinness Premiership	6th	53	–	EDF Energy Cup	2nd in pool	Heineken Cup	4th in pool
2007–08	Guinness Premiership	7th	59	–	EDF Energy Cup	3rd in pool	Heineken Cup	Semi-final
2008–09	Guinness Premiership	3rd	66	Runners-up	EDF Energy Cup	2nd in pool	Challenge Cup	Quarter-final
2009–10	Guinness Premiership	6th	52	–	LV= Cup	3rd in pool	Heineken Cup	3rd in pool
2010–11	Aviva Premiership	6th	54	–	LV= Cup	3rd in pool	Heineken Cup	4th in pool
2011–12	Aviva Premiership	7th	46	–	LV= Cup	2nd in pool	Heineken Cup	4th in pool
2012–13	Aviva Premiership	9th	35	–	LV= Cup	2nd in pool	Challenge Cup	2nd in pool
2013–14	Aviva Premiership	10th	36	–	LV= Cup	3rd in pool	Challenge Cup	2nd in pool
2014–15	Aviva Premiership	10th	40	–	LV= Cup	4th in pool	Challenge Cup	Quarter-final
2015–16	Aviva Premiership	12th (R)	20	–	No competition	N/A	Challenge Cup	Quarter-final
2016–17	Greene King IPA Championship	1st (P)	91	Champions	British and Irish Cup	Semi-final	Not qualified	N/A
2017–18	Aviva Premiership	12th (R)	22	–	Anglo-Welsh Cup	2nd in pool	Challenge Cup	3rd in pool
2018–19	Greene King IPA Championship	1st (P)	99	Champions	Championship Cup	Runners-up	Not qualified	N/A
2019–20	Gallagher Premiership	10th	34	–	Premiership Cup	3rd in pool	Challenge Cup	4th in pool
2020–21	Gallagher Premiership	9th	48	–	No competition	N/A	Challenge Cup	Quarter-final
2021–22	Gallagher Premiership	8th	63	–	Premiership Cup	Runners-up	Challenge Cup	Quarter-final
2022–23	Gallagher Premiership	5th	55	–	Premiership Cup	Runners-up	Heineken Cup	Round of 16

Gold background denotes champions
Silver background denotes runners-up
Pink background denotes relegated

== Club honours ==
=== Major honours ===
- Premiership Rugby
  - Runners–Up: (1) 2008–09
- RFU Championship
  - Champions: (2) 2016–17, 2018–19
- European Challenge Cup
  - Runners–Up: (1) 2005–06
- Premiership Rugby Cup
  - Champions: (1) 2001–02
  - Runners–Up: (3) 1979–80, 2021–22, 2022–23
- Surrey Cup
  - Champions: (4) 1980–81, 1981–82, 1985–86, 1986–87
- Premiership Rugby Sevens Series
  - Champions: (1) 2012

=== Friendly ===
- Middlesex Sevens
  - Champions: (1) 2009
- Cunningham Duncombe Series
  - Champions: (1) 2016

== Notable former players ==
=== Rugby World Cup ===
The following are players who have represented their countries at the Rugby World Cup whilst being registered with London Irish:

Tournament	Players selected	England players	Other national team players
1999	7		Julian Loveday (Canada) , Kieron Dawson (Ireland) , Malcolm O'Kelly (Ireland) , Justin Bishop (Ireland) , Conor O'Shea (Ireland) , Isaac Fe'aunati (Samoa) , Stephen Bachop (Samoa)
2003	0		
2007	7	Peter Richards, Mike Catt	Juan Manuel Leguizamón (Argentina) , Gonzalo Tiesi (Argentina) , Olivier Magne (France) , Seilala Mapusua (Samoa) , Sailosi Tagicakibau (Samoa)
2011	8	Alex Corbisiero, Delon Armitage, Shontayne Hape	Jebb Sinclair (Canada) , Paulică Ion (Romania) , Joe Ansbro (Scotland) , Ofisa Treviranus (Samoa) , Sailosi Tagicakibau (Samoa)
2015	6		Jebb Sinclair (Canada) , Asaeli Tikoirotuma (Fiji) , Blair Cowan (Scotland) , Sean Maitland (Scotland) , Ofisa Treviranus (Samoa) , Halani Aulika (Tonga)
2019	6		Alivereti Veitokani (Fiji) , Motu Matu'u (Samoa) , TJ Ioane (Samoa) , Allan Dell (Scotland) , Steve Mafi (Tonga) , Bryce Campbell (United States)
2023	12 (Note: All 12 players were selected on the basis of performances made whilst at London Irish, though the club entered administration on 6 June 2023 before all squads were confirmed. Ben White, Danilo Fischetti and Luca Morisi had been named in extended squads prior to this date, with the remaining players confirmed in their nations' final 33-man squads afterwards, some whilst unattached, having been left without a club following London Irish's demise.)	Henry Arundell	Ignacio Ruiz (Argentina) , Agustín Creevy (Argentina) , Juan Martín González (Argentina) , Lucio Cinti (Argentina) , Api Ratuniyarawa (Fiji) , Albert Tuisue (Fiji) , Danilo Fischetti (Italy) , Luca Morisi (Italy) , So'otala Fa'aso'o (Samoa) , Ben White (Scotland) , Adam Coleman (Tonga)

== See also ==
- Rugby union in London
- London Cornish
- London Scottish
- London Welsh
- Richmond
- Hazelwood
