= Joe Stanley (rugby union) =

Former NZ All Blacks international rugby union footballer

- Born: Joseph Tito Stanley; 13 April 1957 (age 69) Auckland, New Zealand
- Height: 1.78 m (5 ft 10 in)
- Weight: 83 kg (13 st 1 lb)
- School: Mount Albert Grammar School
- Notable relative(s): Jeremy Stanley; Benson Stanley; Chase Stanley; Kyle Stanley; Sean Maitland

Rugby union career
- Position: Centre
Provincial / State sides
Years	Team	Apps	(Points)
1984–1991	Auckland		
International career
Years	Team	Apps	(Points)
1986–91	New Zealand	49	(28)

Joe Stanley (born 13 April 1957) is a New Zealand former rugby union player. He was born in Auckland, New Zealand.

== Career ==
Stanley played for Ponsonby RFC and Auckland in the National Provincial Championship, and New Zealand as a centre. Joe is a member of the Stanley family which includes Chase and Benson

== Personal life ==
Joe Stanley is a cousin of footballer Tim Cahill. He is also the father of former All Black Jeremy Stanley. Also related to Michael Stanley, Samoan number 13. He is also the uncle of Sam Stanley (English Rugby Union player with Esher).
