= Michael Stanley (rugby union) =

Samoa international rugby union footballer

- Born: 29 December 1989 (age 36) Auckland, New Zealand
- Height: 1.85 m (6 ft 1 in)
- Weight: 97 kg (15 st 4 lb; 214 lb)
- School: Gable Hall School
- Notable relative(s): Sam Stanley (brother); Joe Stanley (uncle); Benson Stanley (cousin); Jeremy Stanley (cousin); Winston Stanley (cousin); Tim Cahill (cousin)

Rugby union career
- Position: First Five-Eighth / Second Five-Eighth
- Current team: Counties Manukau
Senior career
Years	Team	Apps	(Points)
2014−	Counties Manukau	7	(26)
2015	Ulster	2	(0)
- Correct as of 12 August 2015
International career
Years	Team	Apps	(Points)
2014−	Samoa	8	(54)
- Correct as of 26 September 2015

Michael Stanley (born 29 December 1989, Auckland, New Zealand) is a New Zealand-born, English raised, Samoan rugby union rugby player.

== Career ==
Stanley started his senior career in England with Saracens as an academy player from the age of 14. He made his senior debut for Saracens versus Toulon as a centre under the tutelage of Eddie Jones. Stanley was just 18 when he faced a Sonny Bill Williams in his prime during that match. He represented England age groups at U16, U18 and U20's.

He then moved to New Zealand in 2013 to live with (uncle) former Auckland rugby union player, Martin Stanley, to play with for legendary and family club: Ponsonby, his first season in Auckland saw him named in the Auckland ITM Cup training squad but due to a quad injury only managed to represent the Auckland Development a handful of times. After his time in Auckland Stanley made his way south joining Tana Umaga's Counties Manukau Steelers during the 2014 ITM Cup. A long-term injury to first-choice first five-eighth Baden Kerr saw him earn game time and make seven appearances scoring 26 points in the process.

Stanley was also involved with the Chiefs development squad in 2015 before signing a short-term deal with Ulster and moving to Belfast for the four remaining months of the season as injury cover.

== International career ==
Stanley's first experience of international rugby came when he was named in the Samoan squad for the 2014 end-of-year rugby union tests and made his test debut on 8 November 2014 in a 24–13 defeat by Italy in Ascoli Piceno. Stanley was selected in 2015 Pacific Nations Cup, playing and kicking superbly leading on to his selection for the Samoan 2015 Rugby World Cup squad, Stanley had to pull out of Samoa 2016 Pacific Nations Cup campaign due to yet another injury.
