= St Mary the Virgin, Brampton Ash =

Coordinates: 52.4795°N 0.8401°W

St. Mary the Virgin, Brampton Ash
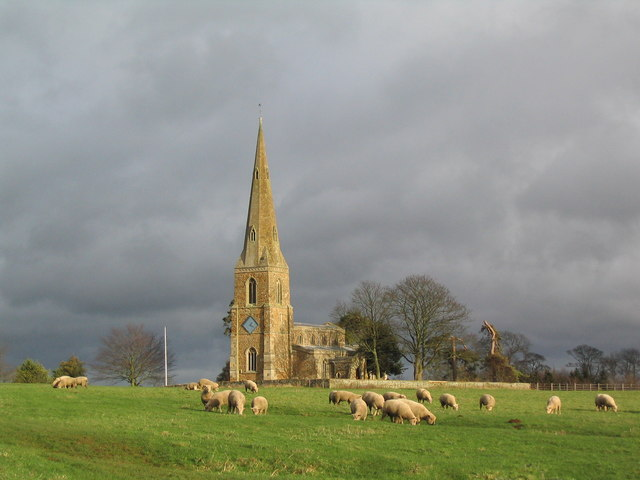
- St. Mary the Virgin, Brampton Ash
- OS grid reference: SP 78866 87480
- Country: England
- Denomination: Church of England
- Website: www.4churches.net

History
- Dedication: St Mary the Virgin

Architecture
- Heritage designation: Grade I listed

Specifications
- Materials: ironstone

Administration
- Diocese: Diocese of Peterborough
- Archdeaconry: Oakham
- Deanery: Kettering
- Parish: Brampton Ash

Clergy
- Rector: Revd Hannah Jeffery

St. Mary the Virgin is the local Church of England parish church for Brampton Ash, Northamptonshire. Sitting in the Diocese of Peterborough, the ironstone church boasts fine carvings of lions.

It is well lit at night, and can be seen across the Welland Valley for miles around.

The church is largely 13th and 14th century with some restoration in the 19th century.

== Memorials ==
On the south wall of the chancel, Charles Norwich, died 1605, and wife, 2 kneeling figures under arch.

On the north wall of the chancel, Thomas Farmer, died 1764, and 2 other tablets.

On the west wall of the south aisle: George Bosworth, died 1804; marble tablet with 2 weeping willows bending over an urn. 2 19th century tablets alongside.

== List of rectors ==
- Thomas, 1230
- John, ?
- Richard de Flammevill, 1264
- Hugh de Valle, 1294
- John de Cumpton, 1319
- John de Stamford, 1325
- John de Felmersham, 1343
- John de Kirkham, 1345
- Oliver de Dineley, 1347
- William de Gayrstang, 1348
- John de Totyngton, 1349
- Robert Wylmot, 1350
- Henry de Greynesby, 1352
- John Noioun, 1352
- John Essex, 1356
- William de Cabernaco, 1357
- William Robert, 1358
- Peter la Sudria, 1358
- John Wade, 1366
- John Millicent, 1375
- John Rodyngton, 1379
- Thomas Ilneston, 1382
- John Wade, 1386
- Walter Tyngyn, ?
- John Bottlesnam, 1395
- William Topclyff, 1396
- William Hole, 1403
- William Fraunceys, ?
- William Islip, 1410
- William Maidwell, 1412
- John Fynche, 1420
- William Halle, 1424
- William Newbery, 1429
- Thomas Webster, 1440
- William Dene, 1441
- Thomas Smyth, 1443
- John Mallory, 1443
- John Smyth, 1446
- John Mallory, 1451
- Richard Hyndeman, 1452
- John Jonys, 1459
- Richard Spicer, 1463
- Walter Oudeby, 1466
- John Bigcrofte, 1483
- David Barker, 1503
- John Devyas, 1509
- Edmund Olyver, 1546
- Anthony Palmer, 1573
- Andrew Broughton, 1577
- William Addison, 1615
- Richard Cumberland, 1662
- Samuel Blackwell, 1691
- Robert Browne, 1720
- Philip Bliss, 1733
- Thomas Farrer, 1734
- William Arden, 1764
- Samuel Rogers, 1769
- Samuel Heyrick, 1790
- Hon. Charles Dundas, 1841
- Sidney Lidderdale Smith, 1844
- Austin Ainsworth Slack, 1904
- Thomas Beckenn Avening Saunders, 1908
- Gerard Cokayne Vecqueray, 1910

In 1928, the benefice was united with Dingley, and the incumbent ceased to be resident at Brampton Ash.
