= Hazelwood (rugby ground) =

Rugby union ground in Sunbury-on-Thames, Surrey, England

- The home of London Irish
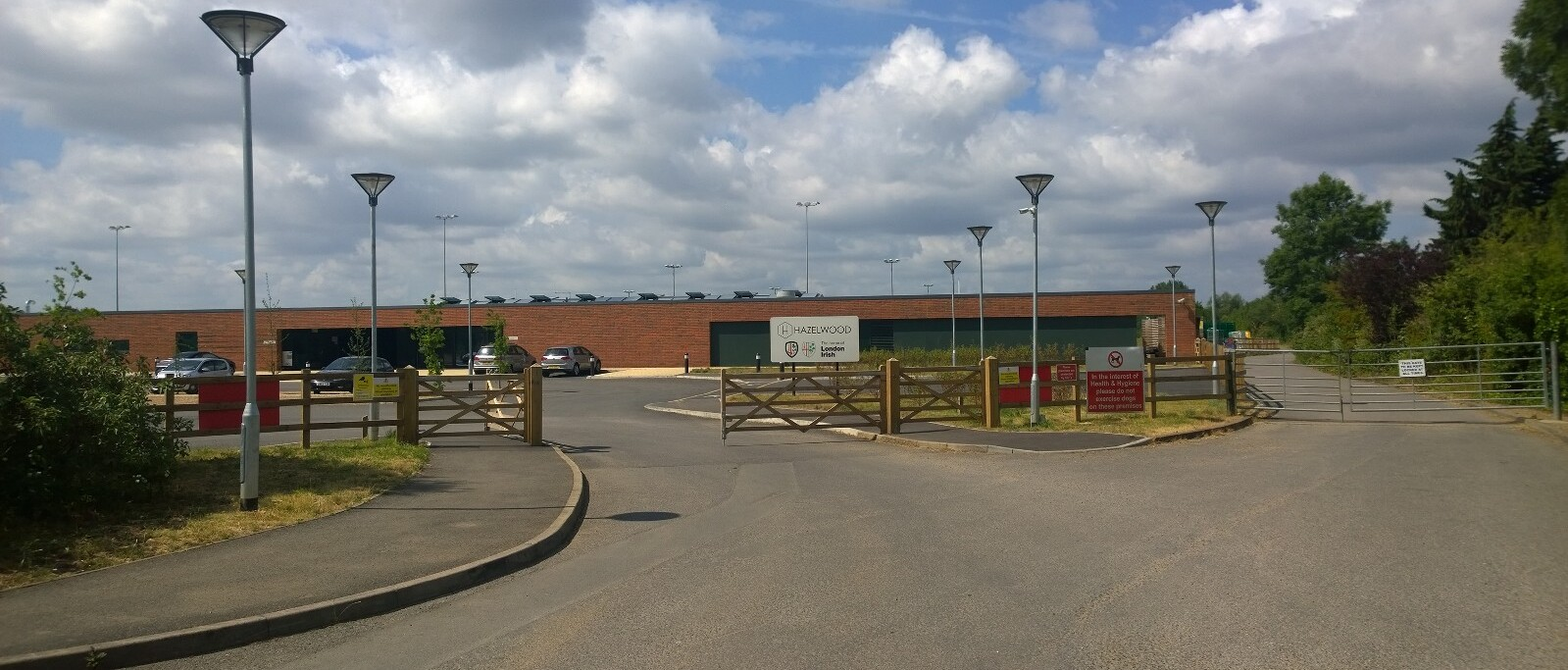
- View of part of clubhouse from the approach road, Hazelwood Drive
- Interactive map of Hazelwood
- Location: Sunbury-on-Thames, Surrey
- Coordinates: 51.407°N 0.420°W
- Owner: London Irish
- Capacity: 2,000
- Type: Sports facility
- Surface: Grass; Rhino-Turf VT60 (one pitch)

Construction
- Built: 2013
- Opened: 2014
- Cost: £12m
- Architect: EPR Architects

Tenants
- London Irish Amateur; London Broncos Women

Website
- https://www.hazelwood-centre.co.uk/

The Hazelwood Centre is a dual-code rugby ground and sports facility in Sunbury-on-Thames in the English county of Surrey. The facility is known as the home of London Irish. The former professional rugby union side London Irish used the facility as its administrative base and for training, Premiership Rugby Shield matches and pre-season friendlies from opening until entering administration in 2023. London Irish Amateur have also used the facility for training and all home games since opening.

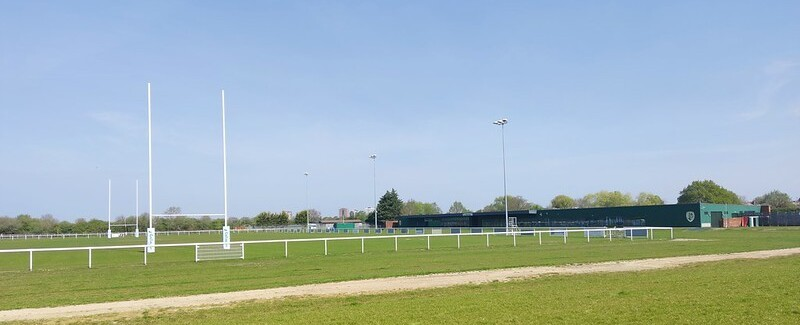
The Hazelwood Centre, the new training and administrative headquarters of the London Broncos, and the home of the London Broncos Women's side

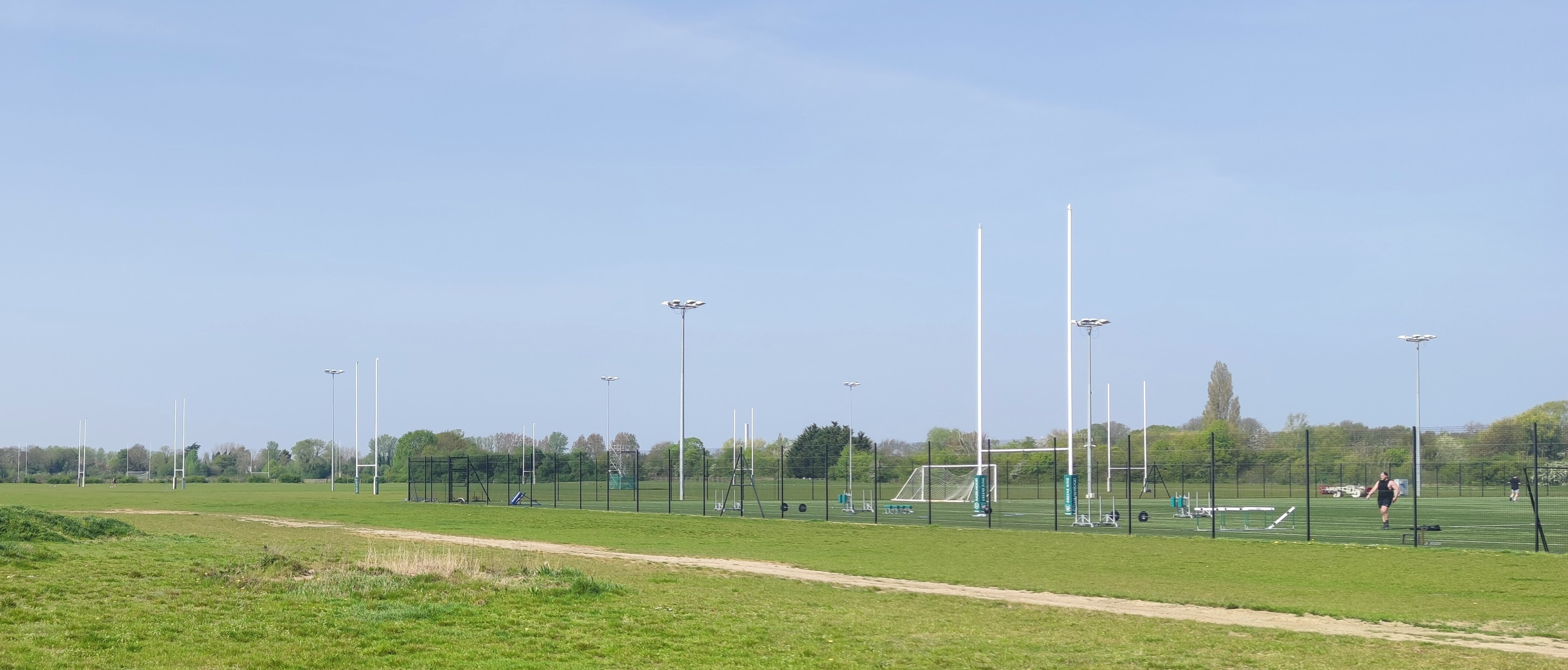
Three grass training pitches & a 4G pitch at the Hazelwood Centre

In November 2025 the rugby league team London Broncos took over the facilities vacated by London Irish professional team with their training and administrative offices being based here. Their women’s team and reserves also play their matches at Hazelwood.

== History and setting ==
Having replaced the facility at The Avenue, the fields sit in the club's natural green-buffered 63-acre holding. The previous owner of this parcel of Metropolitan Green Belt was a golf club (supporting its driving range and nine hole-course). A remnant of its landscaping is a small, professionally-planted pondside reserve. Initially the plans for the Training Ground where blocked in 2011 by then Secretary of State for Communities and Local Government, Eric Pickles, following a public inquiry with local residents who cited the loss of urban space and impact on the green belt as key factors. Following extensive revisions, Spelthorne Borough Council granted permission for the Training Ground to be built a year later.

The facilities officially opened on July 1st 2014 with players past and present invited along with local dignitaries including IRFU President Louis Magee, grandson of Louis Magee, who was one of the founders of London Irish in 1898 and is the first player listed on the club’s International Honours Board.

Following London Irish's Administration in 2023, it was confirmed that the ground was part of the club's insolvency package, meaning it could be sold to creditors to pay off Irish's outstanding debt. The Administrative and Training facilities were closed indefinitely however the pitches were still allowed to be used by London Irish Amateur and Gael Londain GAA. The kitchen, bar and conference room were also permitted to remain open along with the relevant offices.

Hawkedale Primary School is situated adjacent to the clubhouse, with both facilities sharing access via Hazelwood Drive. To the west of the school is the 862nd Sunbury Squadron of the Royal Air Force Air Cadets, a youth organization that provides aviation-related training and leadership development for young people. Additionally, a private track in the vicinity leads to a local fishery, which serves as a recreational spot for anglers and is managed for conservation and leisure activities.

The ground can be accessed by public transport on Green Street with Transport for London operating the 216 between Staines and Kingston and the 235 operating between Brentford and Sunbury Village. Surrey's White Bus number 555 also operates between Heathrow Airport and Walton-on-Thames. Sunbury railway station is located about a mile north of the facility with services into London Waterloo and Shepperton.

== London Broncos ==
In November 2025 the London Broncos moved to a new training base, taking over the former London Irish rugby union club facility in Sunbury-on-Thames in Surrey. The Hazelwood complex will serve as the Broncos new training ground and also their administrative base. The Broncos are the primary tenants at the site, however London Irish Amateur will still continue play their Regional 2 Thames level six games there.

In November 2025, London Broncos Women announced Hazelwood in Sunbury-on-Thames as their new ground to train and play matches for 2026.

== Facilities ==
=== Overview ===
The site has four full-size grass pitches, one full size synthetic (4G) pitch and twelve junior pitches plus a long clubhouse. The northern end of the clubhouse contains changing facilities for the amateur clubs plus a function room, conference room, kitchen and bar. The southern end of the clubhouse was previously used by London Irish professional side and features a changing room, gym and administrative facilities. This end is now home to the Broncos who moved their training and administrative base here in November 2025. A shop for amateur team merchandise is located towards the north end building and is located in a hut. An on-site car park can accommodate 360 vehicles and also has a bike storage rack.

=== Wider training use ===
The facilities have been built to world-class specification and are regularly used by community groups including the GAA. It was also an approved training based for the 2015 Rugby World Cup being used by Wales, Fiji, Argentina and New Zealand.

The New York Jets, Baltimore Ravens, New Orleans Saints, Arizona Cardinals, Philadelphia Eagles and Houston Texans NFL teams also trained here ahead of their NFL London Games in 2015, 2017, 2018 and 2019 respectively with New Orleans returning in 2022. London Irish reciprocated the Jets' agreement by using their facilities ahead of their premiership match in the United States in 2016.

== Events ==
Hospitality, including the bar, is open to local residents for much of the week. Fireworks annually and fundraising events are held during the year, including comedy nights. On Saturday mornings green verges around the pitches host the local parkrun.

Charity Matches dedicated to Matt Ratana took place here with both London Irish and Premiership Rugby sponsoring the event.
