= St Mary the Virgin Church, Corringham =

Historic church in Corringham, Essex, England

Coordinates: 51°31′21″N 0°27′48″E

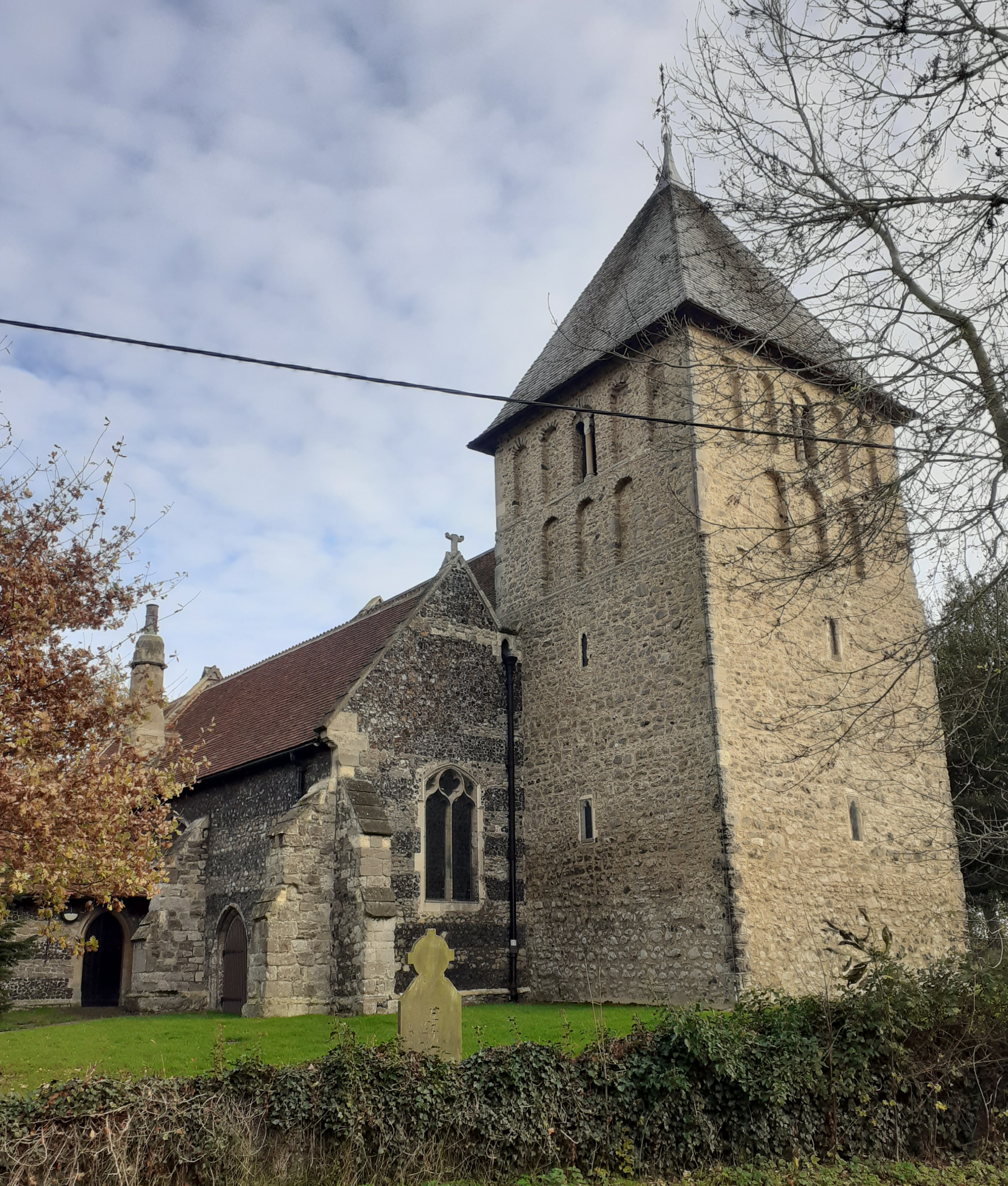
St Mary the Virgin, Corringham

St Mary the Virgin Church is a Church of England parish church in the town of Corringham, Essex, England. Dating from the 11th century, it is a Grade I listed building.

The church has a west tower with a pyramidal roof, a nave and north aisle, and a chancel with a north chapel. It is built of ragstone rubble and flint, with dressings of Reigate stone and limestone.

The Domesday Book of 1086 does not record a church or priest. At that time, landholders in the area included the bishop of London, and bishop Odo of Bayeux.

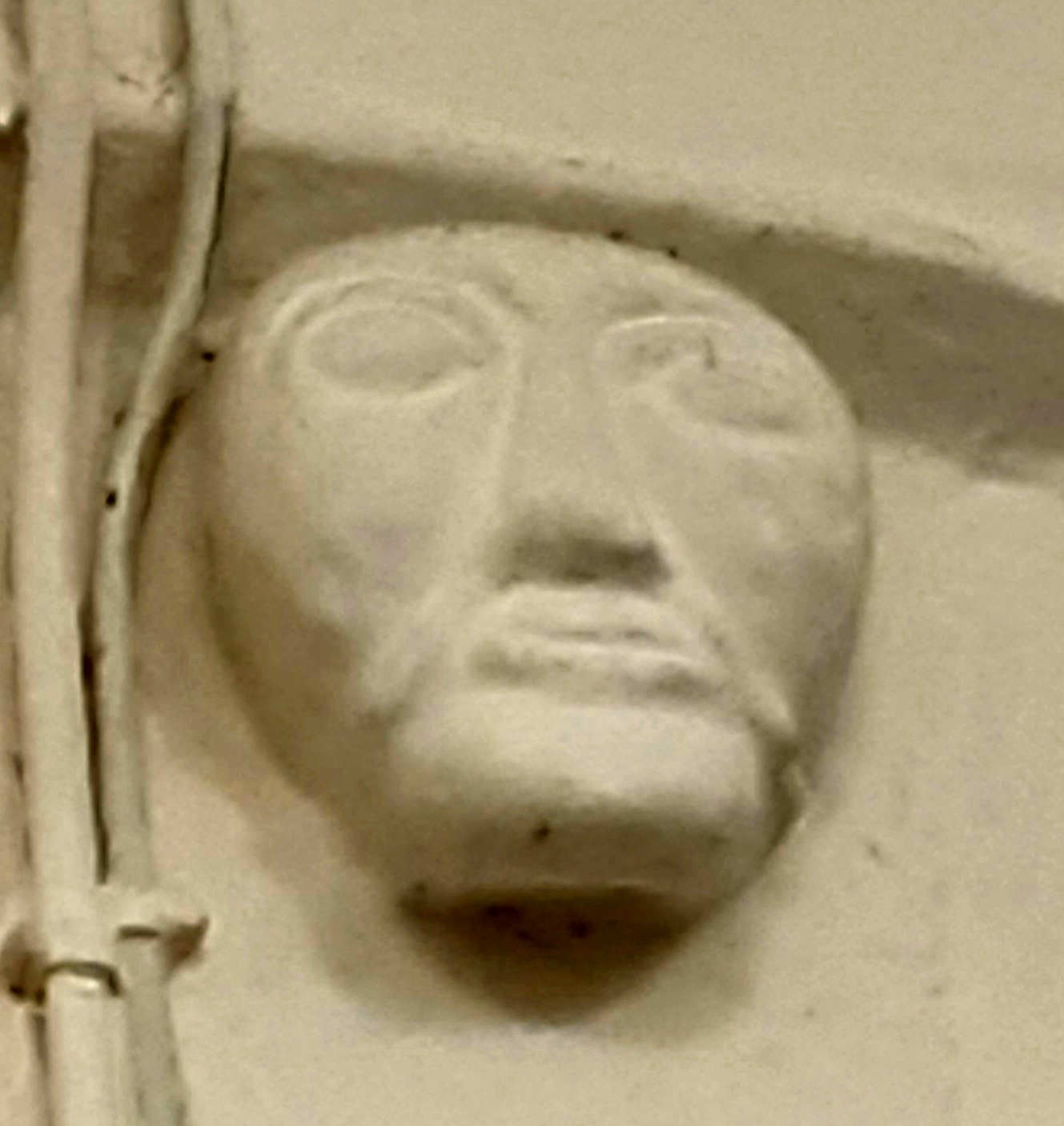
Apex figure, nave face of tower arch, St Mary the Virgin, Corringham

The tower is from the late 11th century, as evidenced by the bell-openings and blind arcading, and inside, the arch with a single order of decoration on each side. Nikolaus Pevsner calls it "one of the most important Early Norman monuments in the county". At the apex of the arch on the east side is a small carving of a human head. The RCME considered the south walls of the chancel and nave to be from earlier in the 11th century, perhaps pre-Conquest, with the tower standing on the foundations of the earlier west wall of the nave.

The north chapel and north aisle were added in the 14th century, and in the same century the chancel was extended eastward and made higher. 19th-century restoration included work in 1843 by George Gilbert Scott, and the south porch and the vestry are also from that century.

The three bells are from 1580, 1629 and 1617.

Today the parish is part of the benefice of Corringham and Fobbing.
