= Benson Stanley =

Former NZ All Blacks international rugby union footballer

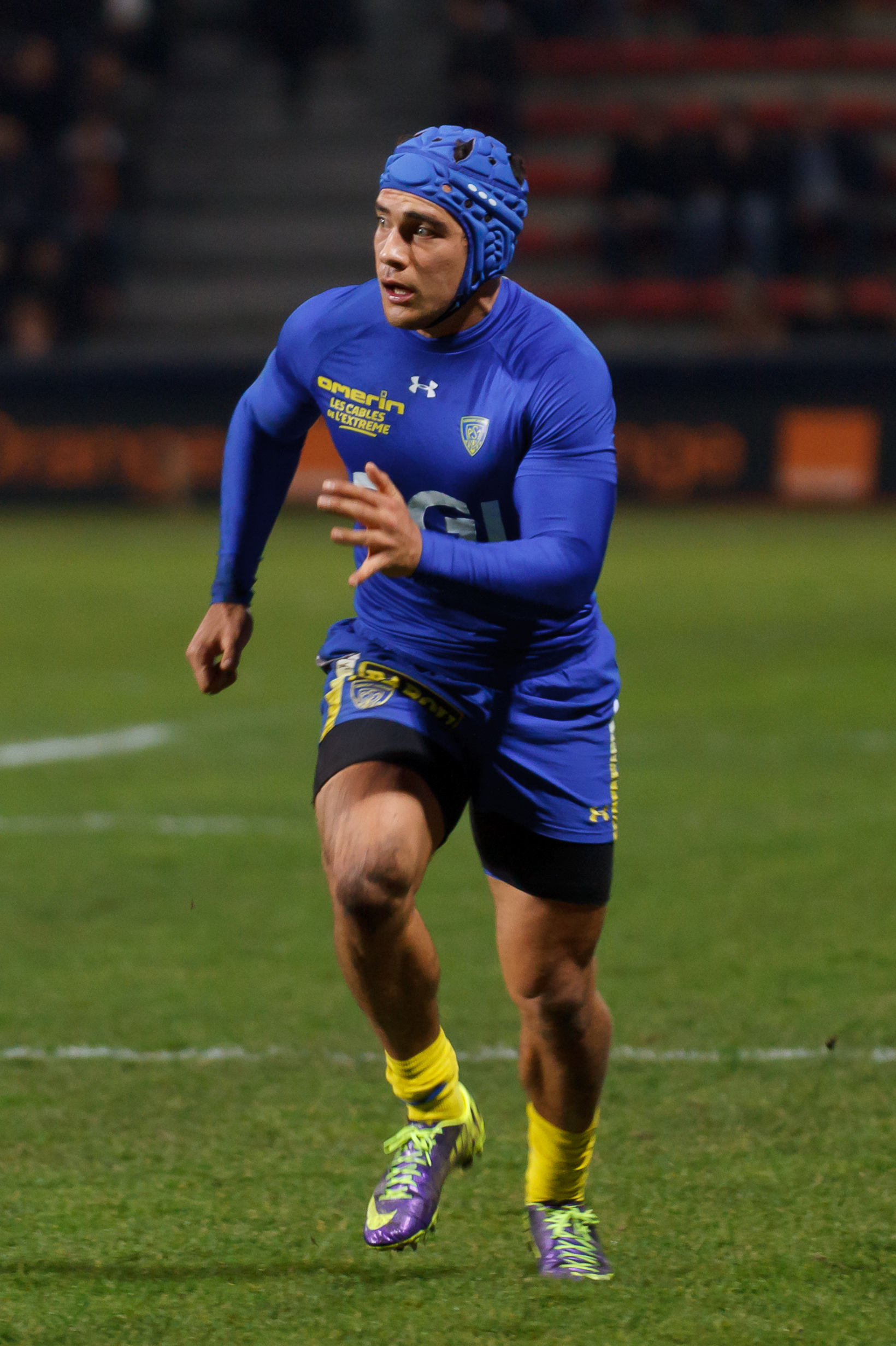
- Born: Benson Joel Stanley; 11 September 1984 (age 42) New South Wales, Australia
- Height: 1.84 m (6 ft 0 in)
- Weight: 98 kg (216 lb)
- School: Auckland Grammar School
- University: University of Auckland

Rugby union career
- Position: Centre
Senior career
Years	Team	Apps	(Points)
2012–2017	Clermont Auvergne	103	(65)
2017-19	Pau	48	(25)
2019-	US Montauban	1	(0)
- Correct as of 31 January 2015
Provincial / State sides
Years	Team	Apps	(Points)
2003–12	Auckland	36	(20)
Super Rugby
Years	Team	Apps	(Points)
2008–12	Blues	53	(40)
- Correct as of 4 June 2012
International career
Years	Team	Apps	(Points)
2010	New Zealand	3	(0)

Benson Stanley (born 11 September 1984 in New South Wales, Australia) is a rugby union player for US Montauban in the Pro D2. Stanley is a product of Auckland Grammar. He plays as a centre. Benson is one of the Stanley rugby clan that includes Chase, Joe, Jeremy, and Kyle. Benson is also the brother of Harlequin F.C. player Winston Stanley. Stanley was named in the 2010 All Blacks squad, making three appearances during the 2010 season. He played for the Blues in the Super Rugby competition between 2008 and 2012.

In 2012, it was announced that Stanley had signed a two-year deal with French side ASM Clermont Auvergne, starting with the 2012–13 Top 14 season.
