= Jeremy Stanley =

Former NZ All Blacks international rugby union footballer

- Born: Jeremy Crispian Stanley; 26 March 1975 (age 51) Ōtāhuhu, New Zealand
- Height: 1.82 m (6 ft 0 in)
- Weight: 94 kg (14 st 11 lb)
- School: Auckland Grammar School
- Notable relative(s): Joe Stanley (father); Benson Stanley (cousin); Winston Stanley (cousin); Michael Stanley (cousin); Tim Cahill (cousin)
- Occupation: Orthopaedic surgeon

Rugby union career
- Position: Centre
Senior career
| Years | Team | Apps | (Points) |
- Ponsonby
Provincial / State sides
| Years | Team | Apps | (Points) |
| 1994–2001 | Auckland | | |
Super Rugby
| Years | Team | Apps | (Points) |
| 1998–1999 | Blues | | |
| – | Highlanders | | |
| – | Hurricanes | | |
International career
| Years | Team | Apps | (Points) |
| 1997 | New Zealand | 3 | (0) |

Jeremy Crispian Stanley (born 26 March 1975) is a former New Zealand rugby union player. He was born in Ōtāhuhu, New Zealand.

He played for the All Blacks, Ponsonby and Auckland and the Hurricanes as a centre.

== Personal life ==
Stanley attend Auckland Grammar School. He is married to former Silverferns captain Anna Stanley, and they reside in Auckland. After his rugby career Jeremy Stanley went to medical school and now specialises in paediatric and sport injury orthopaedic surgery. He is the cousin of Australian soccer player Tim Cahill, and the son of former All Black Joe Stanley.
