= 1988 England rugby union tour of Australia and Fiji =

- Manager: Geoff Cooke
- Tour captain: John Orwin
Summary
P	W	D	L
Total
9	6	0	3
Test match
3	1	0	2
Opponent
P	W	D	L
Australia
2	0	0	2
Fiji
1	1	0	0

The 1988 England rugby union tour of Australia and Fiji was a series of nine matches played by the England national rugby union team in Australia and Fiji in May and June 1988. The England team won six of their nine matches and lost the other three. England lost both games in the two–match test series against the Australia national rugby union team but won the test match against the Fiji national rugby union team.

== Matches ==
Date	Venue	Home	Score	Away
17 May 1988	Quarry Hill Rugby Park, Mackay	Queensland Country	7 – 39	England XV
22 May 1988	Ballymore, Brisbane	Queensland	18 – 22	England XV
25 May 1988	Gold Park, Toowoomba	Queensland 'B'	7 – 19	England XV
29 May 1988	Ballymore, Brisbane	Australia	22 – 16	England
1 June 1988	Hindmarsh Stadium, Adelaide	South Australia Invitation XV	10 – 37	England XV
5 June 1988	Concord Oval, Sydney	New South Wales	23 – 12	England XV
8 June 1988	Brandon Park, Wollongong	New South Wales 'B'	9 – 25	England XV
12 June 1988	Concord Oval, Sydney	Australia	28 – 8	England
16 June 1988	National Stadium, Suva	Fiji	12 – 25	England

== Touring party ==
- Manager: Geoff Cooke
- Assistant Coaches: Alan Davies and David Robinson
- Captain: John Orwin (Bedford) 12 caps

=== Full-backs ===
- Ray Adamson (Top points scorer of the tour) (Wakefield) No caps
- Jonathan Webb (Bristol) 9 caps

=== Three-quarters ===
- Bryan Barley (Wakefield) 4 caps
- John Bentley (Sale) 1 cap
- John Buckton (Saracens) No caps
- Barry Evans (Leicester) No caps
- Simon Halliday (Bath) 6 caps
- Rory Underwood (RAF/Leicester) 24 caps

=== Half-backs ===
- Rob Andrew (Wasps) 17 caps
- Stuart Barnes (Bath) 7 caps
- Richard Harding (Bristol) 9 caps
- Simon Robson (Moseley) No caps

Replacements

- Will Carling (Harlequins) 5 caps
- Tim Buttimore (Leicester) No caps

=== Forwards ===
- Gareth Chilcott (Bath) 9 caps
- Graham Dawe (Bath) 4 caps
- Wade Dooley (Preston Grasshoppers) 20 caps
- David Egerton (Bath) 1 cap
- Brian Moore (Nottingham) 9 caps
- John Orwin (Bedford) 12 caps
- Gary Pearce (Northampton) 34 caps
- Jeff Probyn (Wasps) 5 caps
- Nigel Redman (Bath) 7 caps
- Gary Rees (Nottingham) 14 caps
- Paul Rendall (Wasps) 15 caps
- Dean Richards (Leicester) 11 caps
- Andy Robinson (Bath) No caps
- Mick Skinner (Harlequins) 5 caps

== See also ==
- History of rugby union matches between Australia and England
