= 1989 England rugby union tour of Romania =

== Matches ==
Scores and results list England's points tally first.

Opposing Team	For	Against	Date	Venue	Status
Romania	58	3	13 May 1989	Dinamo Stadium, Bucharest	Test match

== Touring party ==
- Manager: Geoff Cooke
- Coach: Roger Uttley
- Captain: Rob Andrew

=== Full back ===
Simon Hodgkinson (Nottingham)

=== Three-quarters ===
Rory Underwood (Leicester & RAF)
Jeremy Guscott (Bath)
Simon Halliday (Bath)
Chris Oti

=== Half-backs ===
Rob Andrew (Wasps)
Steve Bates (Wasps)

=== Forwards ===
Paul Rendall (Wasps)
Brian Moore (Nottingham)
Gareth Chilcott (Bath)
Wade Dooley (Fylde)
Paul Ackford (Harlequins)
Mike Teague (Gloucester)
Peter Winterbottom (Harlequins)
Dean Richards (Leicester)
Jeff Probyn (Wasps)
Gary Rees (Nottingham)
