= 1990 England rugby union tour of Argentina =

- Manager: Geoff Cooke
- Tour captain: Will Carling
Summary
P	W	D	L
Total
7	3	0	4
Test match
2	1	0	1
Opponent
P	W	D	L
Argentina
2	1	0	1

The 1990 England rugby union tour of Argentina was a series of matches played in July and August 1990 in Argentina by the England national rugby union team. It was the second tour of Argentina by England and was apparently arranged without the tour manager Geoff Cooke's knowledge and at an inconvenient time of the year for the England players in July and August. For this reason, eight England players declined the invitation to make the trip, and the only seasoned internationals on the tour were Will Carling, Richard Hill, Wade Dooley, Brian Moore, Jeff Probyn and Peter Winterbottom.

It was also notable in that it was the first series between Argentina and a Home Nation since 1981, as the Home Nations were prohibited from playing Argentina in the aftermath of the Falklands War in 1982 and represented a start of a warming period of relations between the United Kingdom and Argentina.

England played a total of seven matches, suffering four loses and winning only three games. Banco Nación was one of the teams that defeated England in a surprising 29 to 21 victory, becoming the first club team to achieve that.

== Touring party ==
- Manager: Geoff Cooke
- Assistant Manager: J.J. Elliott
- Coach: Roger Uttley
- Captain: Will Carling (Harlequins) 17 Caps

Player	Matches played	Score				Total points
Player	Matches played	Tries	Conv.	Pen.	Drop	Total points
Steve Bates (Bath – 1 cap – Half-back)	1					0
John Buckton (Saracens – 1 cap – Three-quarter)	5	1				4
Will Carling (Harlequins – 17 caps – Three-quarter)	4	1				4
Graham Childs (Northern – No caps – Three-quarter)	2					0
Wade Dooley (Preston – 34 caps – Forward)	4					0
David Egerton (Bath – 6 caps – Forward)	4	1				4
Nigel Heslop (Orrell – No caps – Three-quarter)	4	2				8
Richard Hill (Bath – 14 caps – Half-back)	5					0
Simon Hodgkinson (Nottingham – 6 caps – Full-back)	4	1	2	16		56
Paul Hull (Bristol – No caps – Full-back)	3					0
Bob Kimmins (Orrell – No caps – Forward)	3	2				8
Jason Leonard (Saracens – No caps – Forward)	4					0
John Liley (Leicester – No caps – Full-back)	4	1	1	3		15
Mark Linnet (Moseley – 1 cap – Forward)	3					0
Brian Moore (Nottingham – 23 caps – Forward)	4					0
Dewi Morris (Orrell – 5 caps – Half-back)	1					0
John Olver (Harlequins – No caps – Forward)	3	1				4
Chris Oti (London Wasps – 7 caps – Three-quarter)	6	1				4
David Pears (Harlequins – No caps – Half-back)	5		3	4		18
Matt Poole (Leicester – No caps – Forward)	3					0
Jeff Probyn (London Wasps – 15 caps – Forward)	4					0
Nigel Redman (Bath – 8 caps – Forward)	4					0
Andy Robinson (Bath – 7 caps – Forward)	3	1				4
Tim Rodber (Northampton – No caps – Forward)	3					0
Dean Ryan (London Wasps – No caps – Forward)	4	2				8
Michael Skinner (Harlequins – 10 caps – Forward)	4					0
Gavin Thompson (Harlequins – No caps – Three-quarter)	3					0
Victor Ubogu (Bath – No caps – Forward)	3					0
Tony Underwood (Leicester – No caps – Three-quarter)	3					0
Peter Winterbottom (Harlequins – 35 caps – Forward)	4					0

== Matches ==
=== Matches summary ===
- Test matches

N°	Date	Opponent	Res.	Score	Venue	City
1	14 July	C.A. Banco Nación	L	21–29	Vélez Sarsfield	Buenos Aires
2	18 July	Tucumán R.U.	W	19–14	Atlético Tucumán	S.M. Tucumán
3	21 July	Buenos Aires R.U.	L	23–26	Vélez Sarsfield	Buenos Aires
4	24 July	Cuyo R.U.	L	21–22	Independiente Rivadavia	Mendoza
5	28 July	Argentina	W	25–12	Vélez Sarsfield	Buenos Aires
6	31 July	Córdoba R.U.	W	15–12	Estadio Córdoba (auxiliar) (Note: Not held in the main ground but in a field located behind it.)	Córdoba
7	4 August	Argentina	L	13–15	Vélez Sarsfield	Buenos Aires

=== Table summary ===
Pld	W	L	T	Ps	Pc
7	3	4	0	137	130

=== Match details ===
Complete list of matches played in Argentina:

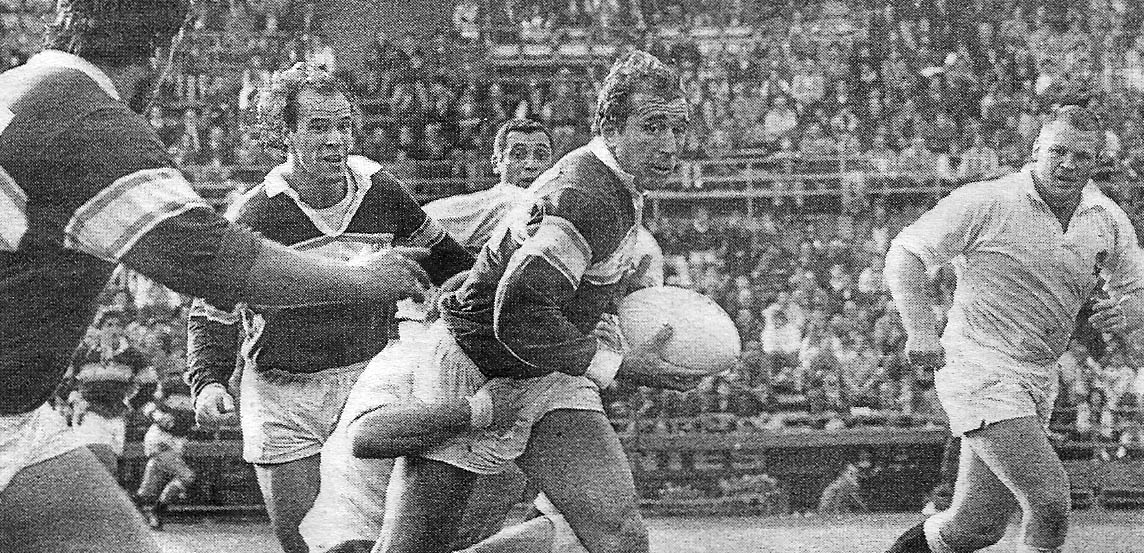
The first match of the tour, v Banco Nación (with its captain Hugo Porta carrying the ball)

Legend: ALU=Alumni, ARU=Australia RU, BAC=Belgrano Athletic Club, BCR=Buenos Aires CRC, BN=Banco Nacón, CASI=C.A. San Isidro, CP=Club Pucará, CUBA=Club Universitario B.A., CUY=Unión de Rugby de Cuyo, HC=Hindú Club, LP=La Plata RC, NEW=Club Newman, PUY=Club Pueyrredón, SIC=San Isidro Club, UAR=Argentine Rugby Union, URT=Unión de Rugby de Tucumán

14 July

Club Banco Nación	29–21	England
Try: Gentile; Gómez; Pen: Porta (5); Drop: Porta (2)		Try: Robinson; Liley; Buckton; Kimmins; Con: Pears; Pen: Pears

Vélez Sarsfield, Buenos Aires
Referee: Jorge Cohen (Argentina)

Banco Nación: P. Soto; G. Benedetto, R. Zanero, P. Pérez, C. Gentile; H. Porta (capt.), F. Gómez; F. Rubio, P. Di Nisio, P. Franchi; R. Etchegoyen, E. Gallo; A. Marrón, O. Cando, G. Inganni
England: J. Liley; N. Heslop, W. Carling (capt.), J. Buckton, C. Oti; D. Pears, R. Hill; D. Egerton, A. Robinson, M. Skinner; M. Poole, R. Kimmins; M. Linnett, B. Moore, V. Ubogu

18 July

Tucumán RU	14–19	England
Try: M. Terán; G. Terán; Pen: Martínez Riera (2)		Try: Olver; Pen: Hodgkinson (3); Pears (2)

Monumental José Fierro, Tucumán
Referee: J. L. Rolandi (Argentina)

Tucumán: F. Williams; M. Terán, P. Gauna, J. Gianotti, G. Terán; J. Martínez Riera, P. Merlo; J. Santamarina, P. Bunader, P. Garretón; O. Fascioli, A. Macome; J. Coria, R. Le Fort, L. Molina
England: S. Hodgkinson (J. Liley); T. Underwood, J. Buckton, G. Thompson, C. Oti; D. Pears, C. Morris; D. Winterbottom, T. Rodber, D. Ryan; W. Dooley, N. Redman; J. Probyn, J. Olver, J. Leonard

21 July

Buenos Aires RU	26–23	England
Try: Cubelli; S. Ezcurra; Laborde; Con: Angaut; Pen: Angaut (4)		Try: Ryan; Carling; Egerton; Heslop; Con: Pears (2); Pen: Pears

Vélez Sarsfield, Buenos Aires
Referee: Efraim Sklar (Argentina)

Buenos Aires: G. Angaut (LP; G. Jorge (CP, E. Laborde (CP, H. García Simón (PUY), S. Ezcurra (CUBA); L. Arbizu (BAC), A. Zanoni (PUY); R. Villalonga (ALU), P. Di Nisio (BN), E. Ezcurra (NEW); E. Etchegoyen (BN), G. Llanes (LP; H. Ballatore (ALU), A. Cubelli (BAC) (capt.), L. Lonardi (SIC).
England: D. Pears; N. Heslop, W. Carling (capt.), G. Thompson, C. Oti; P. Hull, R. Hill; D. Winterbottom, D. Egerton, D. Ryan; W. Dooley, N. Redman; V. Ubogu, J. Olver, J. Leonard.

24 July 1990

Cuyo RU	22–21	England
Try: A. Filizzola; Bertranou; Con: G. Filizzola; Pen: G. Filizzola; Drop: G. Filizzola		Pen: Hodgkinson (7)

Independiente Rivadavia, Mendoza
Referee: Marcelo Firpo (Argentina)

Cuyo: F. Lola; E. Saurina, C. Cipitelli (capt.), Carbonell, M. Roby; G. Filizzola, A. Orrico; M. Bertranou, M. Baeck, A. Filizzola; Gómez, Pascual; J. Acevedo, A. Gutiérrez, F. Méndez
England: J. Liley; T. Underwood, J. Buckton, G. Childs, P. Hull; S. Hodgkinson, R. Hill; A. Skinner, T. Rodber, A. Robinson; M. Poole, R. Kimmins; J. Probyn, B. Moore (capt.), M. Linnet

28 July 1990

Argentina	12–25	England
Pen: Vidou (4)		Try: Ryan; Oti; Con: Hodgkinson; Pen: Hodgkinson (5)

Vélez Sarsfield, Buenos Aires
Referee: Brian Kinsey (Australia)

Argentina	England

Argentina: A. Scolni (ALU); H. Vidou (BCR), M. Loffreda (capt.; SIC), D. Cuesta Silva (SIC), (S. Salvat (ALU); R. Madero (SIC), F. Gómez (BN); P. Bertranou (CUY), M. Baeck (CUY), P. Garretón (URT); A. Iachetti (HC), E. Branca (CASI); L. Molina (URT), J. J. Angelillo (SIC), A. Rocca (BCR)
England: S. Hodgkinson; N. Heslop; W. Carling (capt.), J. Buckton, C. Oti; D. Pears, R. Hill; D. Ryan, P. Winterbottom, M. Skinner; W. Dooley, N. Redman; J. Probyn, B. Moore, J. Leonard

31 July 1990

Córdoba RU	12–15	England
Pen: Cosa (4)		Try: Kimmins; Con: Liley; Pen: Liley (3)

Córdoba Stadium (Cancha Auxiliar), Córdoba
Referee: Miguel Peyrone (Argentina)

Córdoba: J. Cosa; M. Ambroggio, P. Garzón (capt.), M. Gil, N. Andreossi; H. Herrera, H. de Marco; L. Bedoya, S. Irazoqui, D. Tobal; J. Simes, C. Montenegro; G. Rivero, C. Hernández, A. Mammana
England: J. Liley; C. Oti, G. Childs, G. Thompson, T. Underwood; P. Hull, S. Bates; A. Robinson, D. Egerton, J. Rodber; M. Poole, R. Kimmins; V. Ubogu, J. Olver, M. Linnet

4 August 1990

Argentina	15–13	England
Pen: Vidou (5)		Try: Hodgkinson; Heslop; Con: Hodgkinson; Pen: Hodgkinson

Vélez Sarsfield, Buenos Aires
Referee: Brian Kinsey (Australia)

Argentina	England

Argentina: A. Scolni (ALU); (S. Salvat (ALU), M. Loffreda (capt.; SIC), D. Cuesta Silva(SIC), H. Vidou (BCR); R. Madero (SIC), F. Gómez (BN), M. Baeck (CUY), M. Bertranou (CUY), P. Garretón(URT); A. Iachetti (HC), E. Branca (CASI); D. Cash (SIC), J. J. Angelillo (SIC), M. Aguirre (ALU)
England: S. Hodgkinson; N. Heslop, W. Carling (capt.), J. Buckton, C. Oti; D. Pears, R. Hill; D. Ryan, P. Winterbottom, M. Skinner; W. Dooley (49' D. Egerton), N. Redman; J. Probyn, B. Moore, J. Leonard

== See also ==
- History of rugby union matches between Argentina and England
