= 1991 Rugby World Cup final =

Rugby competition in London, England

- Event: 1991 Rugby World Cup
Australia	England
(Australia)	(England)
12	6
- Date: 2 November 1991
- Venue: Twickenham Stadium, London
- Referee: Derek Bevan (Wales)
- Attendance: 56,208

The 1991 Rugby World Cup final was the final match of the 1991 Rugby World Cup, the second edition of the rugby union competition, to decide the world champions. The match was played on 2 November 1991 at Twickenham Stadium, London, and was contested by the host nation England, and Australia (also known as the Wallabies). Australia won the match 12–6.

== Pre-match ==
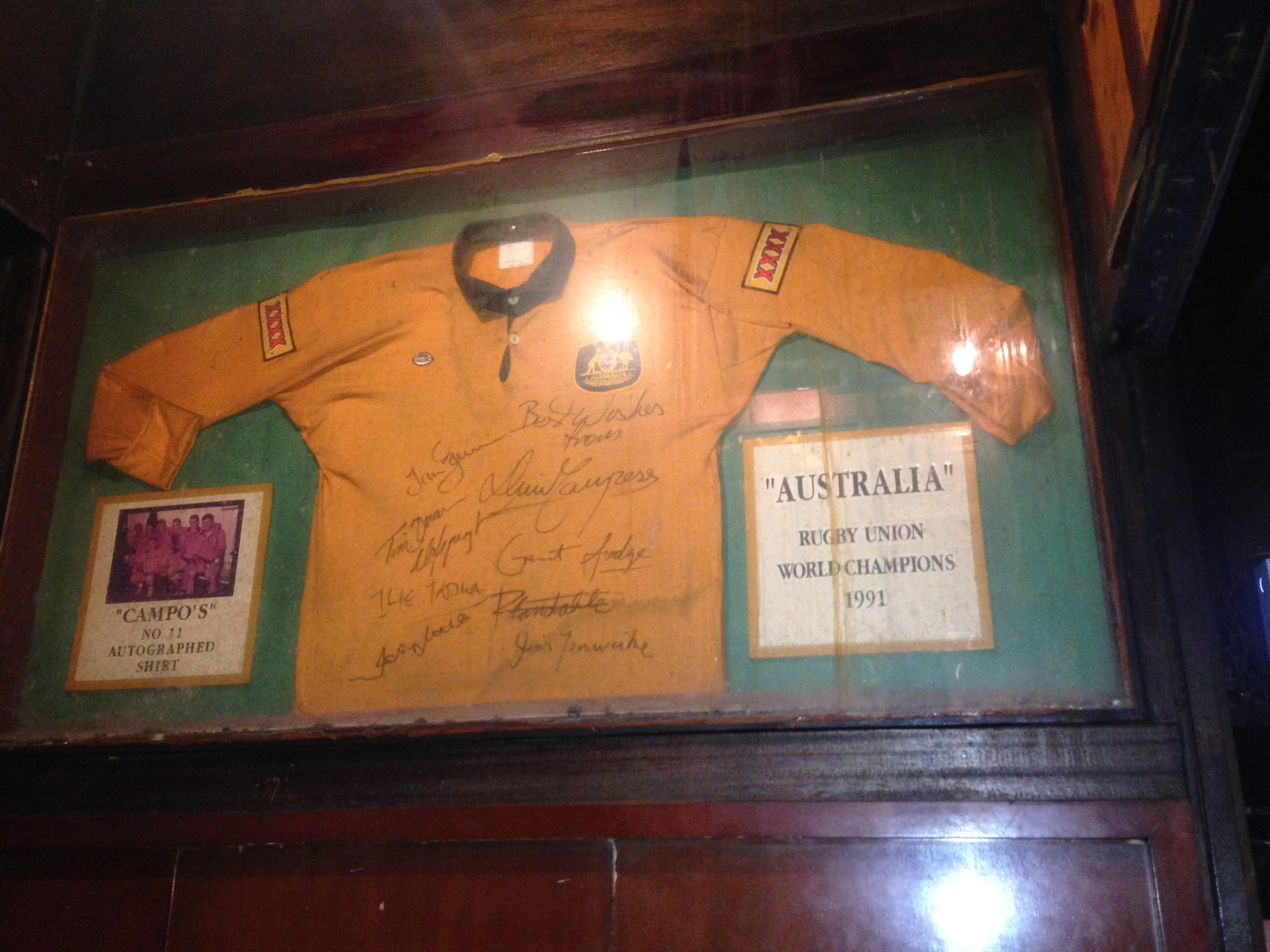
1991 Rugby World Championship - David Campese's no. 11 autographed shirt exhibited in a Hong Kong pub

England had reached the final by playing an attritional, forward-dominated game, but appeared to respond to heavy public criticism from David Campese and rejected this style of play in the final. Jason Leonard later said in his autobiography that the decision to change the tactics was made by Roger Uttley, Geoff Cooke, Will Carling and Rob Andrew. Leonard also said that most of the forwards were unhappy with the decision and they said to the coaches and Carling that they needed to go back to the huge, forward-dominated game that had helped them win four matches since their opening round loss to New Zealand. They chose to play a more expansive and open game, but failed to master it in the short time they had to practice it. The change in play was an attempt to unsettle the Australians, however, this proved flawed. There were also arguments over the composition of England's back row and back line, following selectoral decisions taken at the semi-final stage which resulted in two men playing out of position. Simon Halliday, nominally a centre, playing on the wing instead of the somewhat fragile Nigel Heslop (who had taken a serious pounding in the quarter-final against France) and the injury-prone Chris Oti, was a selection of necessity which worked well enough to be retained as England's first choice selection for a year afterwards: but the dropping of the No. 8 specialist Dean Richards in order to accommodate both of the two in-form blind-side flankers Mike Teague (who played out of position at #8) and Mick Skinner, who had previously been competing for one position at #6, raised considerable critical comment. Even though Richards had been exposed as badly short of form and fitness during England's summer tour of Australia, and was viewed by the English press as the most culpable in their defeats, he was the specialist in the position, an integral part of England's 1991 Grand Slam, and was back to his best by the autumn: however, Teague had also been Player of the Series for the British Lions on their successful tour of Australia in 1989, albeit playing at #6 with Richards at #8: and Skinner was the man in the best current form of all of them, arguably ahead of Teague for the blind-side flanker position. So the choice of three men in two positions was never going to be an easy one, and the selectors went with the man who had shown the best previous form against the opponents they were facing.

Australia, meanwhile, were a settled unit, having already hammered England in the summer months, and also inflicted the first two defeats on New Zealand since the 1987 World Cup: then making that up to three victories in four matches against the now-ageing All Blacks, knocking the champions out 16–6 in the semi-final. Their passage had not been entirely smooth, though, and they had come perilously close to going out at the quarter-final stage when Gordon Hamilton's late try, a flank-forward outsprinting winger David Campese to the line, gave Ireland the lead unexpectedly: however, offered a penalty in front of the posts which would have tied the scores in the final minute, Australia opted to run the ball instead of kick, and fly-half Michael Lynagh scored the try which put them through 19–18. In David Campese - despite his discomfiture against Hamilton - they also boasted the joint top try-scorer of the tournament, with six. Their centre pairing of Horan and Little was also regarded as the best in the world - marginally ahead of England's Carling and Guscott, although the views on this were by no means unanimous.

== Match ==
=== Summary ===
==== First half ====
In front of 56,000 spectators at Twickenham, Australia's resilient defence came to the fore in the opening half. Viliami Ofahengaue and Simon Poidevin both performed well in continually holding up the English attacking threat. Australia opened the scoring on 27 minutes with a Michael Lynagh penalty. Despite English dominance in possession, the only try of the match was scored just three minutes later by prop Tony Daly, touching down for a try following Ofahengaue's break from a line-out and subsequent drive from the Australian forwards. Michael Lynagh converted the try. At half-time Australia led England 9–0.

==== Second half ====
Will Carling, Rob Andrew and Roger Uttley insisted that England continue their open, running style but it failed to crack the Australians. Several of the English forwards, such as Jason Leonard, Brian Moore and Peter Winterbottom were reportedly furious at the decision, Leonard mentioned in his autobiography that both Moore and Winterbottom kept on telling Carling that the tactics needed to change as the English pack was clearly destroying the Australian pack up front. Webb put England on the scoreboard after an hour with a successful penalty kick. Lynagh added a further penalty for the Wallabies after 65 minutes. With the score at 12–3 to Australia, England had secured an overlap in an attack. Peter Winterbottom looked to pass to England winger Rory Underwood but the pass was knocked down by David Campese. This was seen as a deliberate knock-on designed to foil an England score. Welsh referee Derek Bevan awarded the penalty and waved away England calls for a penalty try. Jonathan Webb slotted his second penalty of the game but no further England points were to follow.

=== Details ===
2 November 1991

Australia	12–6	England
Try: Daly 30'; Con: Lynagh; Pen: Lynagh (2)	Match report	Pen: Webb (2)

Twickenham Stadium, London
Attendance: 56,208
Referee: Derek Bevan (Wales)

Australia	England

FB	15	Marty Roebuck
RW	14	Bob Egerton
OC	13	Jason Little
IC	12	Tim Horan
LW	11	David Campese
FH	10	Michael Lynagh
SH	9	Nick Farr-Jones (c)
N8	8	Troy Coker
BF	7	Viliami Ofahengaue
OF	6	Simon Poidevin
RL	5	John Eales
LL	4	Rod McCall
TP	3	Ewen McKenzie
HK	2	Phil Kearns
LP	1	Tony Daly
Coach:
Bob Dwyer

FB	15	Jonathan Webb
RW	14	Simon Halliday
IC	13	Will Carling (c)
OC	12	Jeremy Guscott
LW	11	Rory Underwood
FH	10	Rob Andrew
SH	9	Richard Hill
N8	8	Mike Teague
OF	7	Peter Winterbottom
BF	6	Michael Skinner
RL	5	Paul Ackford
LL	4	Wade Dooley
TP	3	Jeff Probyn
HK	2	Brian Moore
LP	1	Jason Leonard
Coach:
Geoff Cooke

== Broadcasting ==
This match was the last broadcast by Australia's national broadcaster the ABC.

== See also ==
- List of Rugby World Cup finals
