= History of rugby union matches between Australia and England =

The rivalry between the England and Australia national rugby union teams started on 9 January 1909 at Blackheath's Rectory Field in England, during the 1908–09 Australia rugby union tour of Britain, dubbed the 1st Wallabies. The Wallabies won the match 9–3. The two nations next met in 1928, at Twickenham, during the 1927–28 Waratahs tour of the British Isles, France and Canada and England won 18–11. After the 1939–40 Australia rugby union tour of Britain and Ireland was cancelled due to the outbreak of World War II, twenty years passed before England and Australia next met, again at Twickenham, with Australia winning the 1948 test 11–0. It would then be another decade until the two nations played another test against one another. In 1958, they met again at Twickenham, and England won 9–6.

England and Australia played each other twice during the 1960s, first in 1963, when the Wallabies defeated England 18–9 at Sydney's Sports Ground, during England’s first tour overseas. They met again in 1967 during the 1966–67 Australia rugby union tour of Britain, Ireland and France and Australia triumphed 23–11 at Twickenham. The nations played each other another four times during the 1970s; with England winning 20–3 at Twickenham in 1973, Australia winning 16–9 at the Sydney Cricket Ground in 1975 and again one week later 30–21 at Ballymore during the 1975 England rugby union tour of Australia, and England winning in 1976, 23–6 at Twickenham, as part of the 1975–76 Australia rugby union tour of Britain, Ireland and the United States.

The two nations would meet six times during the 1980s, the first encounter was in 1982, during the 1981–82 Australia rugby union tour of Britain and Ireland with England defeating Australia 15–11 at Twickenham. Two years later the Wallabies were victorious at Twickenham, winning 19–3 on their way to winning their first and up to now only Grand Slam. The next match was a pool match in the inaugural 1987 Rugby World Cup at Sydney's Concord Oval in 1987, which Australia won 19–6. The nations played three times in 1988: Australia won 22–16 in Brisbane and 28–8 at the Concord Oval, during the 1988 England rugby union tour of Australia and Fiji with England winning the third and final match at Twickenham 28–19.

The sides met three times during the 1990s before the end of the amateur era and the introduction of the Cook Cup. The first match was in 1991 at the Sydney Football Stadium, won 40–15 by Australia. The next match was the 1991 Rugby World Cup Final at Twickenham, which the Wallabies won 12–6. with Tony Daly scoring the only try of the game. The last pre-Cook Cup match was a quarter-final tie at the 1995 Rugby World Cup in South Africa, played at Newlands Stadium in Cape Town. England won 25–22, thanks to a last-minute drop goal by Rob Andrew.

== Cook Cup and Ella–Mobbs Trophy (since 1997) ==
The Cook Cup came about at the start of Rugby Union's professional era, when the Rugby Football Union (RFU) and the Australian Rugby Union (ARU) agreed to play each other on a home-and-away basis. The first Cook Cup match was played at the Sydney Football Stadium on 25 June 1997. Australia won the match 25–6. The series was however to be decided through two tests, and the second took place at Twickenham in London, this resulted in a 15–15 draw. Since Australia won the first test, they were crowned champions.

In 1998 Australia ran out 76-0 winners at Lang Park in Brisbane. The Wallabies were captained by John Eales, and in total, Australia scored 11 tries against a weakened England side. The subsequent meeting at Twickenham saw England lose by just one point, the score being 12–11. In 1999, the Cook Cup was decided through one match rather than two, as the 1999 Rugby World Cup meant that there was no space in the schedule for a November test match between the countries. Australia defeated England 22–15 at Stadium Australia. In 2000, the Cook Cup was again contested over a single match, due to the 2001 British Lions tour to Australia, and for the first time saw England and Australia meet as reigning champions of their respective hemispheres. The match was played at Twickenham, and England won 22–19 to win the Cook Cup for the first time.

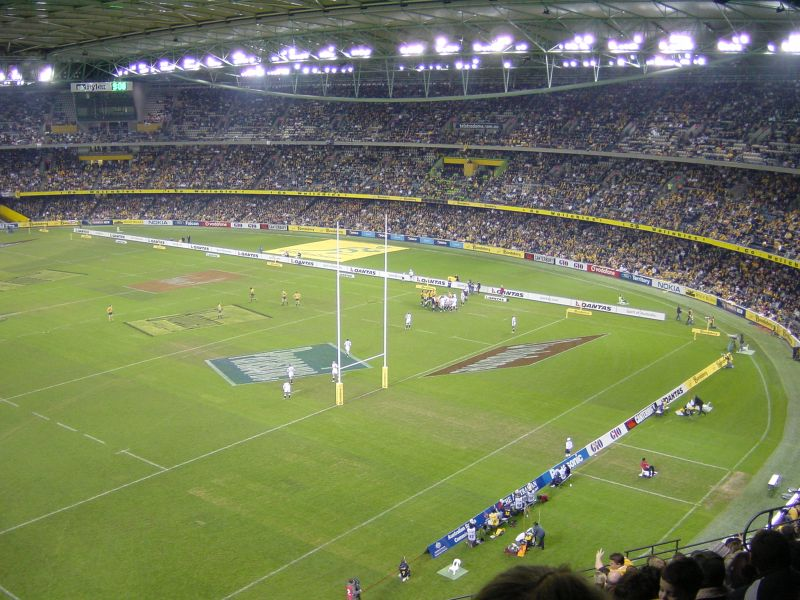
The 2006 match between Australia and England at Telstra Dome.

The single-test format remained for 2002, and England successfully defended the Cook Cup by beating Australia 32–31 at Twickenham. In 2003, the Cook Cup was again decided over one match, owing to the 2003 Rugby World Cup. The match was played at Melbourne's Telstra Dome, and England won 25–14, marking their first ever victory over Australia on Australian soil. Later that year, England repeated the feat when the two nations met in what is arguably their most famous encounter, at the 2003 World Cup final. Jonny Wilkinson landed a drop goal in extra time that saw England win the Rugby World Cup 20–17.

The 2004 Cook Cup was contested over two matches. The first post-World Cup edition of the challenge saw Australia beat England in Brisbane in June and then again in London in November to reclaim the Cook Cup for the first time since 1999. The 2005 Cook Cup was contested over a single test, which England won 26–16 at Twickenham. In June 2006 the countries played a two-match test series in Australia, with the home team winning both matches to regain the Cup.

The Cook Cup has been contested nearly every year since, with the exception of the World Cup years (2007, 2011, 2015 and 2019). Australia retained the cup in 2008, 2009 and the mid-year tests of 2010, before England regained it in the 2010 end-of-year tests. Australia regained the cup in 2012, but since then England have dominated the series, winning it outright in 2013, 2014, 2016, 2017, 2018, 2021, 2022, 2025 and 2026. The match scheduled for Twickenham in November 2020 did not take place, making 2020 the first non-World Cup year this century in which the Cook Cup has not been contested.

The Cook Cup was renamed the Ella–Mobbs Trophy from the July 2022 series.

Since 1909, England and Australia have played each other 58 times. England lead the series by 30 wins to 27, with one match drawn.

== Summary ==
=== Overall ===
Details	Played	Won by Australia	Won by England	Drawn	Australia points	England points
In England	32	12	19	1	537	656
In Australia	23	15	8	0	641	404
Neutral venue	3	0	3	0	48	77
Overall	58	27	30	1	1,226	1,137

=== Records ===
Note: Date shown in brackets indicates when the record was last set.

Record	Australia	England
Longest winning streak	4 (3 November 1984 – 5 November 1988)	8 (11 June 2016 – 2 July 2022)
Largest points for
Home	76 (6 June 1998)	45 (8 November 2026)
Away	42 (9 November 2024)	44 (25 June 2016)
Largest winning margin
Home	76 (6 June 1998)	24 (18 November 2017)
Away	20 (3 October 2015)	16 (18 June 2016)
Neutral	—N/a	24 (19 October 2019)

== Results ==
No.	Date	Venue	City	Score	Winner	Competition
1	9 January 1909	Rectory Field	Blackheath	3–9	Australia	1908–09 Australia tour
2	7 January 1928	Twickenham	London	18–11	England	1927–28 New South Wales tour
3	3 January 1948	Twickenham	London	0–11	Australia	1947–48 Australia tour
4	1 February 1958	Twickenham	London	9–6	England	1957–58 Australia tour
5	4 June 1963	Sports Ground	Sydney	18–9	Australia	1963 England tour
6	7 January 1967	Twickenham	London	11–23	Australia	1966–67 Australia tour
7	17 November 1973	Twickenham	London	20–3	England	1973 Australia tour
8	24 May 1975	SCG	Sydney	16–9	Australia	1975 England tour
9	31 May 1975	Ballymore	Brisbane	30–21	Australia	1975 England tour
10	3 January 1976	Twickenham	London	23–6	England	1975–76 Australia tour
11	2 January 1982	Twickenham	London	15–11	England	1981–82 Australia tour
12	3 November 1984	Twickenham	London	3–19	Australia	1984 Australia tour
13	23 May 1987	Concord Oval	Sydney	19–6	Australia	1987 Rugby World Cup Pool match
14	29 May 1988	Ballymore	Brisbane	22–16	Australia	1988 England tour
15	12 June 1988	Concord Oval	Sydney	28–8	Australia	1988 England tour
16	5 November 1988	Twickenham	London	28–19	England	1988 Australia tour
17	27 July 1991	Football Stadium	Sydney	40–15	Australia	1991 England tour
18	2 November 1991	Twickenham	London	6–12	Australia	1991 Rugby World Cup Final
19	11 June 1995	Newlands	Cape Town (South Africa)	25–22	England	1995 Rugby World Cup Quarter-final
20	12 July 1997	Football Stadium	Sydney	25–6	Australia	1997 England tour
21	15 November 1997	Twickenham	London	15–15	draw	1997 end-of-year Tests
22	6 June 1998	Lang Park	Brisbane	76–0	Australia	1998 England tour
23	28 November 1998	Twickenham	London	11–12	Australia	1998 end-of-year Tests
24	26 June 1999	Stadium Australia	Sydney	22–15	Australia	1999 England tour
25	18 November 2000	Twickenham	London	22–19	England	2000 end-of-year rugby union internationals
26	10 November 2001	Twickenham	London	21–15	England	2001 end-of-year Tests
27	16 November 2002	Twickenham	London	32–31	England	2002 end-of-year rugby union internationals
28	21 June 2003	Docklands Stadium	Melbourne	14–25	England	2003 England tour
29	22 November 2003	Stadium Australia	Sydney	17–20	England	2003 Rugby World Cup Final
30	26 June 2004	Lang Park	Brisbane	51–15	Australia	2004 England tour
31	27 November 2004	Twickenham	London	19–21	Australia	2004 end-of-year rugby union internationals
32	12 November 2005	Twickenham	London	26–16	England	2005 end-of-year rugby union internationals
33	11 June 2006	Stadium Australia	Sydney	34–3	Australia	2006 England tour
34	17 June 2006	Docklands Stadium	Melbourne	43–18	Australia	2006 England tour
35	6 October 2007	Stade Vélodrome	Marseille (France)	10–12	England	2007 Rugby World Cup Quarter-final
36	15 November 2008	Twickenham	London	14–28	Australia	2008 end-of-year rugby union internationals
37	7 November 2009	Twickenham	London	9–18	Australia	2009 end-of-year rugby union internationals
38	12 June 2010	Subiaco Oval	Perth	27–17	Australia	2010 England tour
39	19 June 2010	Stadium Australia	Sydney	20–21	England	2010 England tour
40	13 November 2010	Twickenham	London	35–18	England	2010 end-of-year rugby union internationals
41	17 November 2012	Twickenham	London	14–20	Australia	2012 end-of-year rugby union internationals
42	2 November 2013	Twickenham	London	20–13	England	2013 end-of-year rugby union internationals
43	29 November 2014	Twickenham	London	26–17	England	2014 end-of-year rugby union internationals
44	3 October 2015	Twickenham	London	13–33	Australia	2015 Rugby World Cup Pool match
45	11 June 2016	Lang Park	Brisbane	28–39	England	2016 England tour
46	18 June 2016	Melbourne Rectangular Stadium	Melbourne	7–23	England	2016 England tour
47	25 June 2016	Football Stadium	Sydney	40–44	England	2016 England tour
48	3 December 2016	Twickenham	London	37–21	England	2016 end-of-year rugby union internationals
49	18 November 2017	Twickenham	London	30–6	England	2017 end-of-year rugby union internationals
50	24 November 2018	Twickenham	London	37–18	England	2018 end-of-year rugby union internationals
51	19 October 2019	Ōita Stadium	Ōita (Japan)	40–16	England	2019 Rugby World Cup Quarter-final
52	13 November 2021	Twickenham	London	32–15	England	2021 end-of-year rugby union internationals
53	2 July 2022	Perth Stadium	Perth	30–28	Australia	2022 England tour
54	9 July 2022	Lang Park	Brisbane	17–25	England	2022 England tour
55	16 July 2022	SCG	Sydney	17–21	England	2022 England tour
56	9 November 2024	Twickenham	London	37–42	Australia	2024 end-of-year rugby union internationals
57	1 November 2025	Twickenham	London	25–7	England	2025 end-of-year rugby union internationals
58	8 November 2026	Twickenham	London	45-22	England	2026 Nations Championship

== List of series ==
Played	Won by Australia	Won by England	Drawn
6	3	2	1

Year	Australia	England	Series winner	Ella–Mobbs Trophy (Note: Formerly known as the Cook Cup)
1975	2	0	Australia	N/A
1988	2	0	Australia	N/A
2006	2	0	Australia	
2010	1	1	draw	
2016	0	3	England	
2022	1	2	England	

== Venues ==
As of 7 November 2025.

=== In Australia ===
Location	Stadium	Australia	England
Sydney, New South Wales	Sydney Sports Ground	1	—N/a
Sydney, New South Wales	Sydney Cricket Ground	1	1
Sydney, New South Wales	Concord Oval	2	—N/a
Sydney, New South Wales	Sydney Football Stadium	2	1
Sydney, New South Wales	Stadium Australia	2	2
Brisbane, Queensland	Ballymore Stadium	2	—N/a
Brisbane, Queensland	Lang Park	2	2
Melbourne, Victoria	Docklands Stadium	1	1
Melbourne, Victoria	Melbourne Rectangular Stadium	—N/a	1
Perth, Western Australia	Subiaco Oval	1	—N/a
Perth, Western Australia	Perth Stadium	1	—N/a
Overall		15	8

=== In England ===
City/Region	Stadium	England	Australia	Drawn
Blackheath	Rectory Field	—N/a	1	—N/a
London	Twickenham	18	11	1
Overall		18	12	1
