= France vs British Lions (1989) =

France vs British & Irish Lions, 1989
- Event: Bicentennial of the French Revolution
France	British Lions
27	29
- Date: 4 October 1989
- Venue: Parc des Princes, Paris
- Referee: J.B. Anderson (Scotland)
- Attendance: 28,881

France vs British & Irish Lions, 1989. As part of the celebrations for the Bicentennial of the French Revolution, in 1989 France played a British Lions team.

The match was classed as a friendly or exhibition game and thus test caps were not awarded.

== Match ==
4 October 1989

France XV	27–29	(British & Irish Lions) British Lions
Try: Benetton, Blanco, Camberabero; Con: Camberabero (3); Pen: Camberabero (3)		Try: Andrew, Hastings (2); Con: Hastings; Pen: Hastings (4); Drop-goal: Andrew

Parc des Princes, Paris
Attendance: 28,881
Referee: J.B. Anderson (Scotland)

FB	15	Serge Blanco
RW	14	Bernard Lacombe
OC	13	Philippe Sella
IC	12	Marc Andrieu
LW	11	Patrice Lagisquet
FH	10	Didier Camberabero
SH	9	Pierre Berbizier (c)
N8	8	Laurent Rodriguez
OF	7	Olivier Roumat
BF	6	Thierry Devergie
RL	5	Gilles Bourguignon
LL	4	Philippe Benetton
TP	3	Laurent Seigne
HK	2	Dominique Bouet
LP	1	Marc Pujolle	(substituted off) 62'
Replacements:
PR	16	Herve Chabowski	(substituted on) 62'
N8	17	Marc Cécillon
FL	18	Thierry Maset
SH	19	Henri Sanz
FH	20	Thierry Lacroix
WG	21	David Berty
Coach:
(France) Jacques Fouroux

FB	15	(Scotland) Gavin Hastings
RW	14	(Scotland) Scott Hastings
OC	13	(Ireland) Brendan Mullin
IC	12	(England) Jeremy Guscott
LW	11	(England) Rory Underwood
FH	10	(England) Rob Andrew (c)
SH	9	(Wales) Robert Jones
N8	8	(England) Dave Egerton
OF	7	(England) Andy Robinson
BF	6	(Ireland) Phillip Matthews
RL	5	(Scotland) Damian Cronin
LL	4	(England) Paul Ackford
TP	3	(England) Jeff Probyn
HK	2	(Ireland) Steve Smith
LP	1	(Wales) Mike Griffiths
Replacements:
PR	16	(Ireland) Des Fitzgerald
HK	17	(Scotland) Gary Callander
SR	18	(Ireland) Neil Francis
SH	19	(Ireland) Fergus Aherne
FH	20	(Scotland) Craig Chalmers
FB	21	(Wales) Tony Clement
Coach:
(Scotland) Ian McGeechan

== See also ==
- 1989 British Lions tour to Australia
