= List of Rugby World Cup finals =

List of Men's Rugby World Cup finals

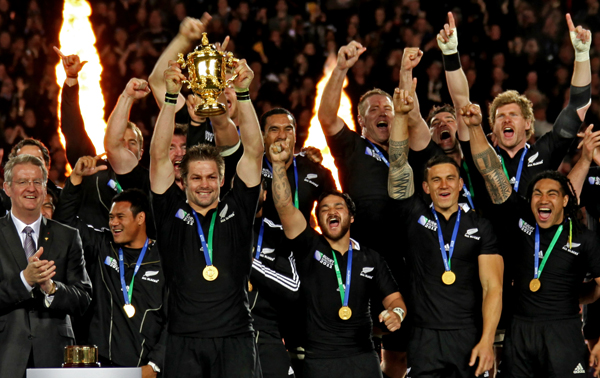
- New Zealand national rugby union team celebrate their victory in the 2011 Rugby World Cup final
- Sport: Rugby union
- Instituted: 1987
- Number of teams: 20
- Country: International (World Rugby)
- Holders: South Africa (2023)
- Most titles: South Africa (4 titles)

The Rugby World Cup is an international rugby union competition established in 1987. It is contested by the men's national teams of the member unions of the sport's governing body, World Rugby, and takes place every four years. The winners of the first final were New Zealand, who beat France. South Africa never competed in the first two world cups due to Apartheid sanctions. South Africa are the latest winners, having won the 2023 Rugby World Cup in France.

The Rugby World Cup final is the last match of the competition. The winning team is declared world champion and receives the Webb Ellis Cup. If the score is a draw after 80 minutes of regular play, an additional 20-minute period of play, called extra time, is added. If the score remains tied, an additional 10 minutes of sudden-death extra time are played, with the first team to score points immediately declared the winner. If no team is able to break the tie during extra time, the winner is ultimately decided by a penalty shootout. Two finals have gone to extra time: South Africa's victory against New Zealand in the 1995 final, and England's triumph against Australia in the 2003 final.

Only five nations have ever made it into a Rugby World Cup final. South Africa is the most successful team in the history of the tournament, with four wins, followed by New Zealand with three wins. New Zealand and South Africa are the only teams to have won consecutive tournaments, with New Zealand winning in 2011 and 2015, and South Africa winning in 2019 and 2023, Springboks currently being the only team to have won every World cup final they were in. Australia have won the competition twice, while England have one win; they are the only nation from the Northern Hemisphere to have won the competition. France are the only team to appear in a final without ever winning one, losing all three finals they have contested.

== History ==
The first final of the Rugby World Cup was contested in June 1987, in Auckland, between New Zealand and France. The host team opened the scoring in the 14th minute, following a drop goal by fly-half Grant Fox. They extended their lead later in the first half when Michael Jones scored a try, which was converted by Fox. Losing 9–0 at half-time,^{[A]} the French opened their scoring in the second half, through a penalty by Didier Camberabero. Following this, New Zealand controlled the match and tries from David Kirk, John Kirwan and the goal kicking of Fox extended their lead to 29–3. A try by Pierre Berbizier in the final minutes, which was converted by Camberabero, reduced the deficit to 29–9, as New Zealand won the tournament's inaugural final.

As the hosts, England reached the final of the 1991 tournament at Twickenham, where they faced Australia. Fly-half Michael Lynagh opened the scoring for Australia with a penalty in the 27th minute. They extended their lead before half-time when prop Tony Daly scored a try, which was converted by Lynagh. England scored two penalties in the second half, courtesy of full-back Jonathan Webb, but a further penalty by Lynagh sealed Australia's victory at 12–6. The tournament hosts reached the final again in 1995, as South Africa faced New Zealand in Johannesburg. Fly-half Andrew Mehrtens opened the scoring for New Zealand in the 6th minute after scoring a penalty. His opposite number, Joel Stransky, levelled the score five minutes later. The pair swapped successful penalty attempts before Stransky gave South Africa a 9–6 lead with a 32nd-minute drop goal just before half-time. New Zealand equalized in the 55th minute with a drop goal by Mehrtens, and as no further points were scored, the final went into extra time for the first time. Mehrtens converted a penalty to put New Zealand back the lead, but Stransky replied minutes later. With seven minutes to the end of extra time, Stransky scored a drop goal to secure a 15–12 victory for South Africa. Nelson Mandela, the South African President, wearing a Springboks jersey, presented the Webb Ellis Cup to South Africa captain Francois Pienaar.

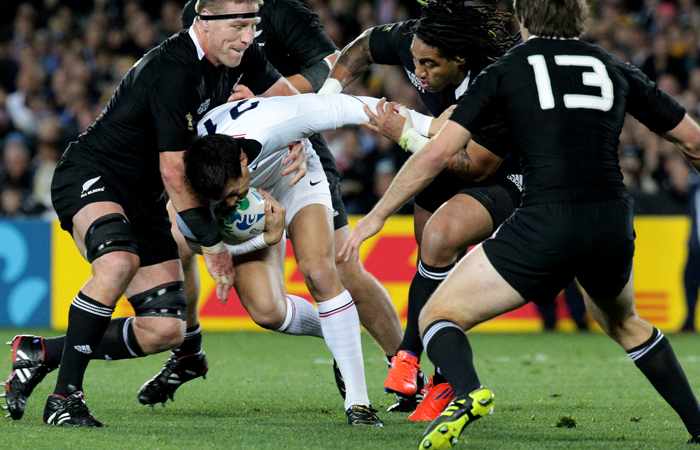
François Trinh-Duc tackled by New Zealand players during the 2011 Rugby World Cup final.

The 1999 final saw Australia face France at the Millennium Stadium in Cardiff. Two tries by Owen Finegan and Ben Tune, and seven penalties by Matt Burke contributed to Australia's 35–12 win, as they became the first nation to win the Rugby World Cup twice. Australia also became the first side to contest successive finals when they faced England in the 2003 final at the Telstra Stadium in Sydney. The hosts opened the scoring in the sixth minute through a Lote Tuqiri try. England responded and scored three penalties by fly-half Jonny Wilkinson and a try by winger Jason Robinson to achieve a 14–5 lead at half-time. Three penalties from Elton Flatley in the second half allowed Australia to level the score and send the final into extra time. Wilkinson and Flatley scored a penalty apiece before the former scored a drop goal in the last minute of the match to give England a 20–17 victory. They became the first side from the Northern hemisphere to win the tournament.

England reached the final again in 2007, where they faced South Africa, who had won 36–0 when the two teams met during the pool stage. South African full-back Percy Montgomery scored three penalties to Wilkinson's one to give South Africa a 9–3 lead at half-time. England had a try disallowed in the first minutes of the second half, when Mark Cueto was adjudged to be in touch before scoring. A penalty from Wilkinson and a further two penalties, one from Montgomery, and one from Steyn reduced the gap but did not prevent South Africa from winning 15–6 and secure their second World Cup victory. The 2011 final pitted hosts New Zealand against France for the second time in the tournament, after their first encounter in the pool stage resulted in a 37–17 win for New Zealand. The host team scored the first points of the match, with a try in the 15th minute through prop Tony Woodcock. Nine minutes later, New Zealand's third-choice fly-half Aaron Cruden went off injured and was replaced by Stephen Donald, who had only been called into the squad following injuries to first-choice fly-halves Dan Carter and Colin Slade. Donald extended New Zealand's lead in the second half with a penalty; a minute later, French captain Thierry Dusautoir scored a try, which was converted by François Trinh-Duc to leave France one point behind New Zealand. Despite constant pressure from the French for the remainder of the final, they were unable to score more points and New Zealand won the match 8–7 to lift their second World Cup trophy.

New Zealand reached the final again in 2015, where they faced Australia at Twickenham. Tries from Nehe Milner-Skudder, Ma'a Nonu and Beauden Barrett, along with four penalties, two conversions and one drop goal from fly-half Dan Carter produced a 34–17 win for New Zealand. With this victory, they became the first team to win the World Cup three times and the first holders to retain the trophy. It was also the first time that New Zealand won the competition outside of their country. South Africa beat England 32–12 in the final of the 2019 Rugby World Cup with Handré Pollard kicking 22 points to dominate the English. This was the first time the winning team had lost a match during and gone to win the competition; South Africa lost 23–13 against New Zealand in the pool stage. They then repeated the same feat four years later in 2023, losing to Ireland in the group stages before winning each of their three knockout games by a single point, beating France, England and New Zealand in succession to join New Zealand as the only nations to win back-to-back Rugby World Cups.

== Finals ==
Key
†	Match was won during extra time

- The "Year" column refers to the year the Rugby World Cup was held, and wikilinks to the article about that tournament.
- Links in the "Winners" and "Runners-up" columns point to the articles for the national rugby teams of the countries, not the articles for the countries.
- The wikilinks in the "Final score" column point to the article about that tournament's final game.

List of final matches, and respective venues, finalists and scores
Year	Winners	Final score	Runners-up	Venue	Location	Attendance	Ref(s)
1987	New Zealand	29–9	France	Eden Park	Auckland, New Zealand	48,035	
1991	Australia	12–6	England	Twickenham Stadium	London, England	56,208	
1995	South Africa	15–12^{†}^{[B]}	New Zealand	Ellis Park Stadium	Johannesburg, South Africa	62,000	
1999	Australia	35–12	France	Millennium Stadium	Cardiff, Wales	72,500	
2003	England	20–17^{†}^{[C]}	Australia	Stadium Australia	Sydney, Australia	82,957	
2007	South Africa	15–6	England	Stade de France	Saint-Denis, France	80,430	
2011	New Zealand	8–7	France	Eden Park	Auckland, New Zealand	61,079	
2015	New Zealand	34–17	Australia	Twickenham Stadium	London, England	80,125	
2019	South Africa	32–12	England	Nissan Stadium	Yokohama, Japan	70,103	
2023	South Africa	12–11	New Zealand	Stade de France	Saint-Denis, France	80,065	

== Results by nation ==
List of total final results, and respective runners-up, years won and years runners-up
National team	Wins	Runners-up	Total finals	Years won	Years runners-up
South Africa	4	0	4	1995, 2007, 2019, 2023	—
New Zealand	3	2	5	1987, 2011, 2015	1995, 2023
Australia	2	2	4	1991, 1999	2003, 2015
England	1	3	4	2003	1991, 2007, 2019
France	0	3	3	—	1987, 1999, 2011

== See also ==
- List of Women's Rugby World Cup finals
- List of Rugby League World Cup finals

== Notes ==
A. Prior to 1992, a try was worth four points.

B. Score was 9–9 after 80 minutes.

C. Score was 14–14 after 80 minutes.
