= 1992–93 Pilkington Cup =

English rugby union competition

- Countries: England
- Champions: Leicester (4th title)
- Runners-up: Harlequins

The 1992–93 Pilkington Cup was the 22nd edition of England's premier rugby union club competition at the time. Leicester won the competition defeating Harlequins in the final. The event was sponsored by Pilkington and the final was held at Twickenham Stadium.

== Draw and results ==
=== First round ===
| Home | Away | Score |
|---|---|---|
| Amber Valley | Hereford | 3-6 |
| Askeans | Ruislip | 24-0 |
| Berry Hill | Salisbury | 24-10 |
| Bradford | Aspatria | 23-9 |
| Bridgwater | Old Alleynians | 20-17 |
| Brixham | Tabard | 16-18 |
| Camborne | Redruth | 11-24 |
| Chesterfield | Worcester | 8-13 |
| Clifton | Horsham | 43-10 |
| Exeter | Newbury | 30-6 |
| Harrogate | Leamington | 25-15 |
| High Wycombe | Old Colleians | 27-0 |
| Lichfield | Penrith | 52-3 |
| London Welsh | Havant | 31-8 |
| Lydney | Basingstoke | 13-6 |
| Sedgley Park | Leeds | 6-20 |
| Sheffield | Liverpool St Helens | 17-14 |
| Sudbury | North Walsham | 19-12 |
| Tiverton | Henley | 21-30 |
| Towcestrians | Macclesfield | 15-10 |
| Tynedale | Hartlepool | 39-16 |
| Vale of Lune | Otley | 3-46 |
| Vipers | Broughton Park | 5-15 |
| Westcombe Park | Old Blues | 7-18 |

=== Second round ===
| Home | Away | Score |
|---|---|---|
| Bedford | Askeans | 21-12 |
| Bridgwater | Redruth | 3-7 |
| Coventry | Hereford | 34-15 |
| Exeter | Berry Hill | 15-13 |
| Fylde | Leeds | 21-6 |
| Henley | London Welsh | 18-40 |
| Lichfield | Waterloo | 8-39 |
| Lydney | Clifton | 6-9 |
| Morley | Broughton Park | 39-17 |
| Moseley | Harrogate | 16-12 |
| Old Blues | Blackheath | 3-27 |
| Otley | Sale | 8-14 |
| Richmond | Sudbury | 37-15 |
| Rosslyn Park | Plymouth | 49-3 |
| Tabard | High Wycombe | 14-9 |
| Towcestrians | Newcastle Gosforth | 8-36 |
| Tynedale | Sheffield | 21-14 |
| Wakefield | Bradford | 31-9 |
| Worcester | Nottingham | 15-39 |

=== Third round ===
| Home | Away | Score |
|---|---|---|
| Clifton | Exeter | 3-19 |
| Coventry | Nottingham | 14-28 |
| Harlequins | Blackheath | 72-3 |
| London Scottish | Leicester | 11-20 |
| Morley | Tynedale | 10-6 |
| Moseley | Fylde | 19-6 |
| Newcastle Gosforth | Gloucester | 13-10 |
| Orrell | Sale | 20-3 |
| Redruth | London Welsh | 16-7 |
| Richmond | Wakefield | 22-25 |
| Rosslyn Park | Wasps | 10-37 |
| Rugby | Bedford | 27-14 |
| Saracens | Bristol | 20-15 |
| Tabard | Northampton | 13-50 |
| Waterloo | Bath | 9-8 |
| West Hartlepool | London Irish | 13-8 |

=== Fourth round ===
| Home | Away | Score |
|---|---|---|
| Harlequins | Wakefield | 47–18 |
| Northampton | Newcastle Gosforth | 33–3 |
| Nottingham | Leicester | 3–28 |
| Redruth | Exeter | 3–8 |
| Rugby | Moseley | 5–11 |
| Wasps | Saracens | 18–17 |
| Waterloo | Orrell | 8–3 |
| West Hartlepool | Morley | 21–3 |

=== Quarter-finals ===
| Home | Away | Score |
|---|---|---|
| Leicester | Exeter | 76–0 |
| Northampton | Moseley | 37–15 |
| Waterloo | Harlequins | 14–21 |
| West Hartlepool | Wasps | 9–15 |

=== Semi-finals ===
| Home | Away | Score |
|---|---|---|
| Leicester | Northampton | 28–6 |
| Wasps | Harlequins | 13–14 |

=== Final ===
1 May 1993

| Leicester | 23–16 | Harlequins |
| Try: Potter; Johnson; Con: Liley 2 Pen: Liley 2 Drop: Harris | | Try: Glenister; Con: Challinor; Pen: Challinor 3 |

Twickenham Stadium, London
Attendance: 54,000
Referee: Tony Spreadbury (Bath)

Leicester
Harlequins

| O | John Liley |
| N | Tony Underwood |
| M | Ian Bates |
| L | Stuart Potter |
| K | Rory Underwood |
| J | Jez Harris |
| I | Aadel Kardooni |
| G | Dean Richards |
| H | Neil Back |
| F | John Wells (c) |
| E | Matt Poole |
| D | Martin Johnson |
| C | Darren Garforth |
| B | Richard Cockerill |
| A | Graham Rowntree |
Replacements:
| P | Laurence Boyle |
| Q | Darren Grewcock |
| R | Dave Hopper |
| S | Chris Johnson |
| T | Simon Povoas |
| U | Nigel Richardson |
Coach:
Ian "Dosser" Smith

| 15 | Kent Bray |
| 14 | Chris Madderson |
| 13 | Will Carling |
| 12 | Gavin Thompson |
| 11 | Jeff Alexander |
| 10 | Paul Challinor |
| 9 | Rob Glenister |
| 8 | Chris Sheasby |
| 7 | Peter Winterbottom (c) |
| 6 | Mark Russell |
| 5 | Richard Langhorn |
| 4 | Alex Snow |
| 3 | Andy Mullins |
| 2 | Brian Moore |
| 1 | Jason Leonard |
Replacements:
| 16 | Richard Goodwin |
| 17 | Stuart Thresher |
| 18 | Mark Evans |
| 19 | Martin Hobley |
| 20 | Simon Dear |
| 21 | Nick Kilick |
Coach:
