= David Pears (rugby union) =

England international rugby union player

David Pears (born 6 December 1967 (age 58)) is a former English rugby union player, who played for Harlequins and England. He played as a fly-half. He won 4 England caps, the first two on the 1990 England rugby union tour of Argentina, came on as a replacement during the 1992 Six Nations match against France and started at full back against France two years later.

== Schooldays ==
He grew up in the village of Seaton, on the outskirts of Workington, playing junior Rugby League for the village youth teams coached by his father Reggie. He first went to Moorclose Secondary School before attending Workington Grammar School. Whilst playing school rugby David’s unique skills drew the attention of two physical education teachers, Tom Borthwick and Malcolm Brown, both county stalwarts and stars of Aspatria Rugby Union Football Club. At the age of fifteen he naturally came to Aspatria, after captaining an array of county school sides at both codes of Rugby and Soccer.

== Aspatria Rugby Union Football Club ==
He made his senior debut in the 1985-1986 season when he helped Aspatria win the Cumberland Rugby Union Challenge Cup on two occasions. The 1987 final against Moresby was a personal triumph for Pears who scored fifteen of his sides nineteen points, including a winning try in the final five minutes. He starred again in the following season when Aspatria gained a narrow victory over Cockermouth, with Pears kicking three conversions. However it was the home tie against Wasps in the third round of the John Players Cup that brought him national attention. Although the Wasps fielded a side littered with internationals with Rob Andrews and Nigel Melville the opposition half-backs it was David Pears and his colleague George Doggart who earned the praise. After leading the County Colts to several memorable victories he was selected to play for the North of England Colts. In 1987 he was called into the squad for the England B international against Italy but suffered an injury and missed the game. Although the 1987-88 season was his last with the Aspatria club he made a memorable exit. He was without doubt the star of the Cumberland Cup winning side that shattered the dreams of Moresby. He made an outstanding contribution to the rejuvenation of the county side; he played magnificently against Wasps and other Pilkington Cup opposition and was instrumental in assisting Aspatria secure a position in the Courage North Division 2 League.

== Sale Rugby Union Football Club ==
At the beginning of the 1988-99 season, in conjunction with teammate George Doggart, Pears signed for Sale. Shortly afterwards he was invited to attend an under 21 international training session at Nottingham. He gained his first England B cap on 22 October 1988, when England were beaten by Australia. He gained his first North Divisional representative cap against the Midlands, a few days before his 21st birthday, scoring nineteen points with five penalties and one try. By 1989, Pears career was riding high, he finished 8th overall in the ‘Top Points’ competition, scoring 239 points, including seven tries, fourteen conversions, fifty-four penalties and seven drop goals.

== Harlequins Rugby Union Football Club ==
After spending a season with Sale, Pears moved further south to join Twickenham based club Harlequins, where he spent most of the 1990s. During his time at Harlequins the club reached two Pilkington Cup finals. They won the first against Northampton in 1991 and lost the second against Bath the following year. Both went to extra-time. His junior international career was also gaining strength, with games against the United States of America, Roumania, Ireland, Italy, Fiji, France and Russia.

== International ==
Pears won four caps for England, the last two against France in Paris, where they won both matches. The first game, in 1992, was a brutal affair. Two of the French forwards were sent off and England won quite convincingly, 31-13. Pears came on midway through the first half after Rob Andrew suffered a nasty gash to his head. However, within a minute of stepping on the field Jean-François Tordo gave him a crack and broke his nose. That was nothing compared to the rest of the injuries he sustained through his career. He once suffered a suspected broken neck playing in a Seven-a-side game for Harlequins. On another occasion on the Friday before an international against Wales, he tore a hamstring in training, denying him the chance to play at Twickenham. He also broke his ankle the week before Andrew announced his retirement, and missed three whole seasons as a result. He was regarded by many as Andrew's natural successor in the England No.10 jersey but Mike Catt got the opportunity instead.

== Final years ==
After leaving Harlequins he had a short spell at both Bracknell and Worcester. Geoff Cooke tried to persuade him to go full-time at Worcester but he turned the offer down and played his final three years at his wife’s home based team at Wharfedale.

== Bibliography ==
- Terry Carrick (1995). Aspatria: The History Of A Rugby Union Football Club. Nottingham: Adland Press.
