= 2019 Rugby World Cup final =

Rugby competition in Yokohama, Japan

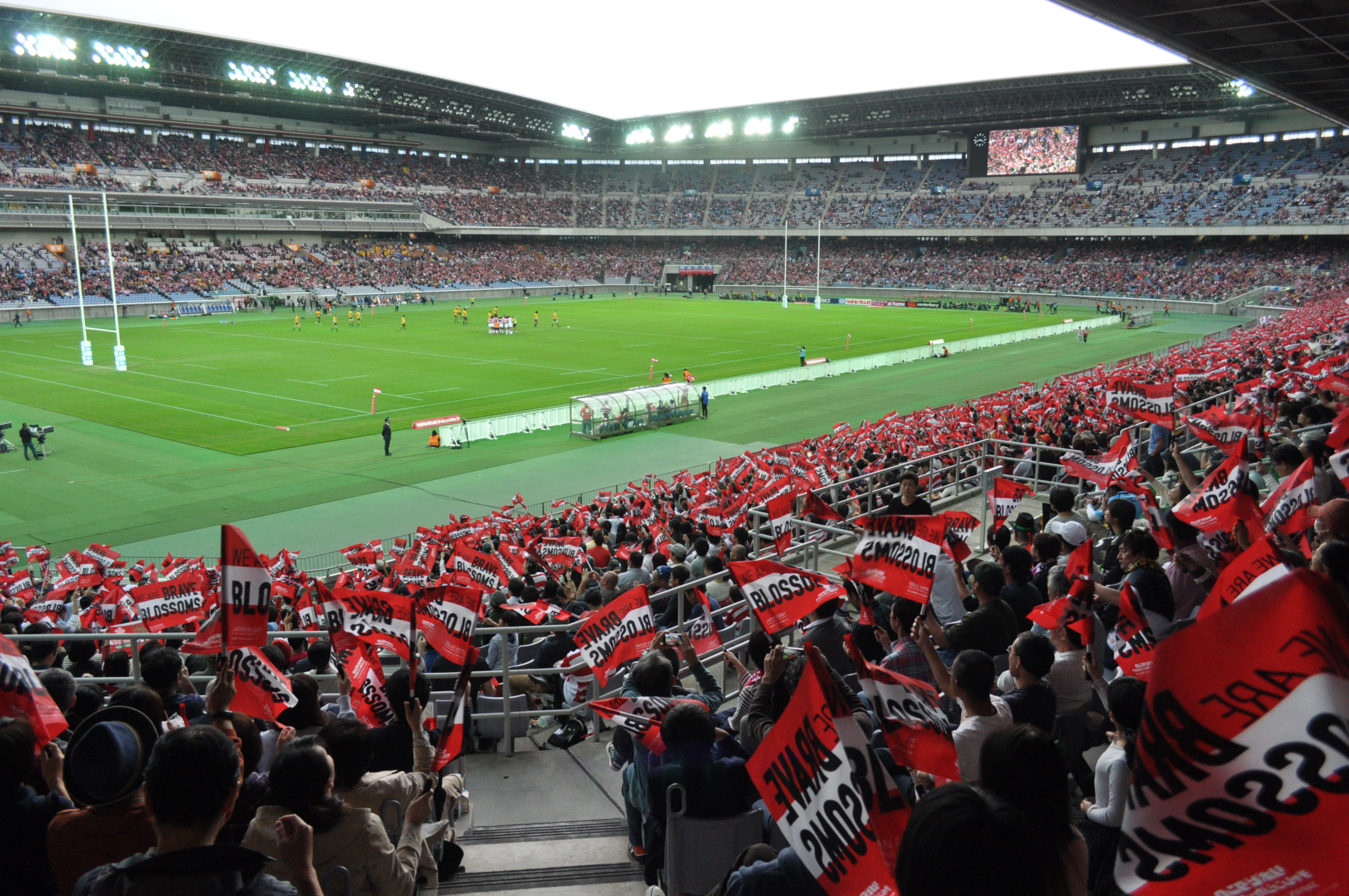
- International Stadium Yokohama hosted the match
- Event: 2019 Rugby World Cup
England	South Africa
(England)	(South Africa)
12	32
- Date: 2 November 2019
- Venue: International Stadium Yokohama, Yokohama
- Man of the Match: Duane Vermeulen (South Africa)
- Referee: Jérôme Garcès (France)
- Attendance: 70,103

The 2019 Rugby World Cup final was a rugby union match played on 2 November 2019 at the International Stadium Yokohama in Yokohama, Japan. It marked the culmination of the 2019 Rugby World Cup and was played between England and South Africa, a rematch of the 2007 Rugby World Cup final.

The match saw South Africa claim their third Rugby World Cup title with a 32–12 victory, with tries from Makazole Mapimpi and Cheslin Kolbe adding to six penalties and two conversions from Handré Pollard. The official player of the match was South Africa's number eight, Duane Vermeulen.

The match was the United Kingdom's most watched TV broadcast in 2019 with a peak audience of 12.8 million watching on ITV.

== Route to the final ==
England
Round
South Africa
Pool C
Pool stage
Pool B
Opponent
Result
Opponent
Result
Tonga
35–3
Match 1
New Zealand
13–23
United States
45–7
Match 2
Namibia
57–3
Argentina
39–10
Match 3
Italy
49–3
France
0–0^{1}
Match 4
Canada
66–7

Pos	Team	Pld	W	D	L	PF	PA	T	B	Pts
1	England	4	3	1	0	119	20	17	3	17
2	France	4	3	1	0	79	51	9	1	15
3	Argentina	4	2	0	2	106	91	14	3	11
4	Tonga	4	1	0	3	67	105	9	2	6
5	United States	4	0	0	4	52	156	7	0	0

Final standing

Pos	Team	Pld	W	D	L	PF	PA	T	B	Pts
1	New Zealand	4	3	1	0	157	22	22	2	16
2	South Africa	4	3	0	1	185	36	27	3	15
3	Italy	4	2	1	1	98	78	14	2	12
4	Namibia	4	0	1	3	34	175	3	0	2
5	Canada	4	0	1	3	14	177	2	0	2

Opponent
Result
Knockout stage
Opponent
Result
Australia
40–16
Quarter-finals
Japan
26–3
New Zealand
19–7
Semi-finals
Wales
19–16

England's final pool match with France was called off on safety grounds due to the impact caused by Typhoon Hagibis; according to tournament rules, the result was declared a 0–0 draw.

=== England ===
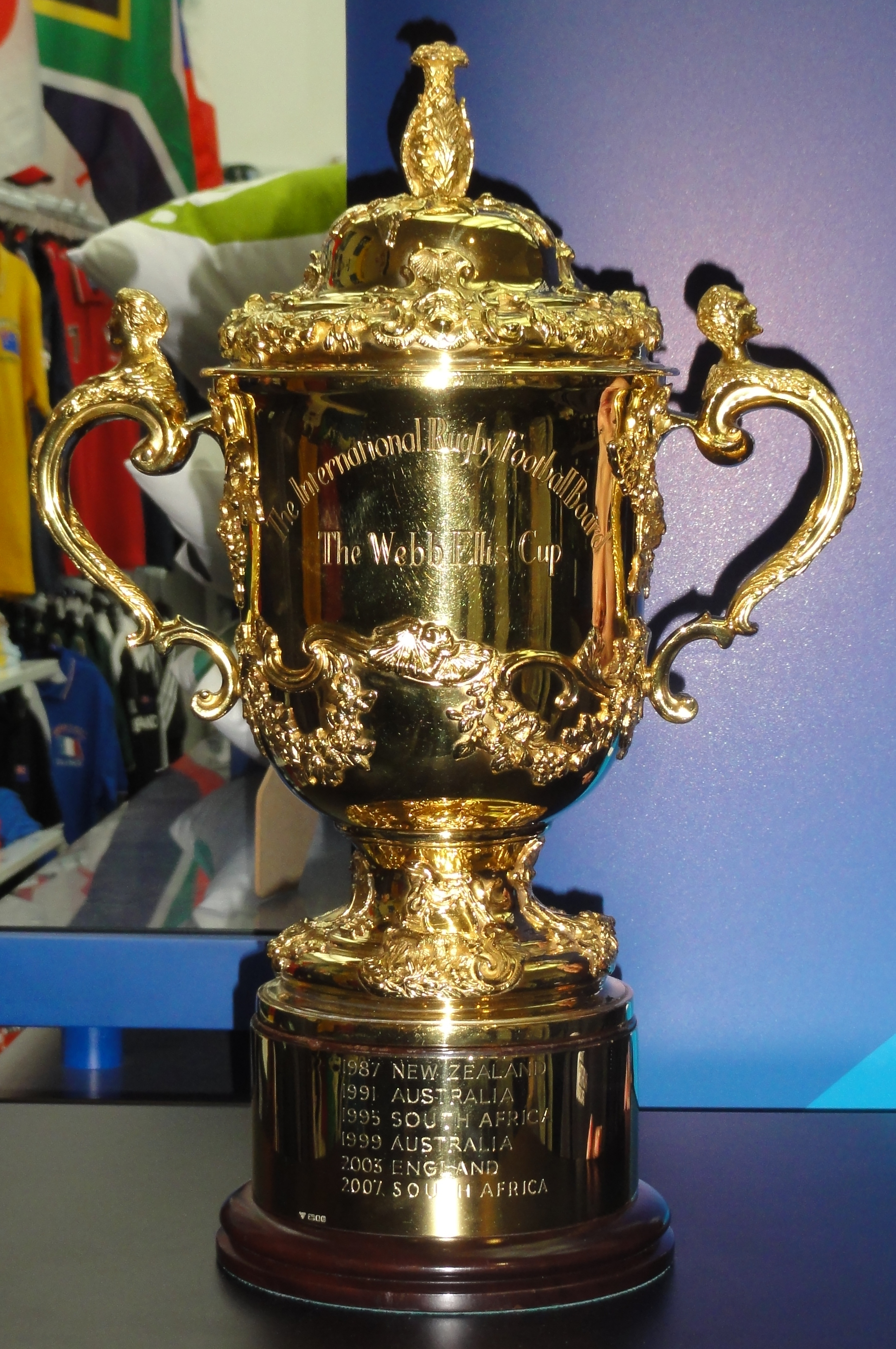
The Webb Ellis Cup

England reached the final after topping their pool with bonus point wins against Tonga, the United States and Argentina. Their final group match against France was cancelled due to Typhoon Hagibis and was recorded as a scoreless draw. In the quarter-finals, England played Australia at Oita Stadium, Ōita. England won 40–16 thanks to two tries from Jonny May and one each from Kyle Sinckler and Anthony Watson, all converted by Owen Farrell, who also added four penalties. In the semi-final at Yokohama Stadium, England played the reigning champions New Zealand. England beat the All Blacks 19–7, breaking New Zealand's 18-match winning streak at World Cups, with a try from Manu Tuilagi converted by Farrell, and four penalties from George Ford. This was England's fourth appearance in a World Cup final, having last been world champions in 2003. They had also reached the final in 1991, when they lost to Australia, and 2007, losing to South Africa. Prior to the final, England called up Saracens scrum-half Ben Spencer as a late replacement for Willi Heinz who had suffered a hamstring injury during the semi-final against New Zealand. England named an unchanged starting team for the final.

=== South Africa ===
South Africa's World Cup campaign began with a loss to New Zealand in their opening match in the pool, but they followed it up with bonus-point wins over Namibia, Canada and Italy to progress in second place in Pool B. In the quarter-finals, they played the hosts Japan, winning 26–3 through two tries from Makazole Mapimpi and one from Faf de Klerk, with one conversion and three penalties from Handré Pollard. In the semi-final, they played Wales and won 19–16 due to a converted try from Damian de Allende and four penalties from Pollard, including the match-winner in the 76th minute. This was South Africa's third appearance in the World Cup final, following victories over New Zealand on home soil in 1995 and England in France in 2007. South Africa made only one change for the final with Cheslin Kolbe replacing S'busiso Nkosi on the right wing.

== Match ==
=== Summary ===
England started as favourites for the final, but they had an unfortunate start to the game as Kyle Sinckler was substituted in the third minute after colliding with Maro Itoje, leaving England with only one tighthead prop. South Africa tight forwards Bongi Mbonambi and Lood de Jager also left the field with injuries in the 21st minute. In the first half, the only points scored were from penalties, with South Africa leading 12–6 at half-time after several handling errors by England, who came close to scoring a try, but did not manage to score after 26 phases.

Two more successful penalties for each side made the score 18–12 early in the second half. Makazole Mapimpi scored the first try in the 66th minute, when he ran in on the left before touching down, making South Africa's lead 25–12 after the conversion. Despite South Africa having won two previous World Cups, he was the first Springbok to score a try in a World Cup final. Cheslin Kolbe followed up with another try eight minutes later, running in from the right wing to make the final score 32–12.

=== Details ===
2 November 2019
18:00 JST (UTC+09)

England	12–32	South Africa
Pen: Farrell (4/5) 23', 35', 52', 60'	Report	Try: Mapimpi 66' c Kolbe 74' c Con: Pollard (2/2) 67', 75'; Pen: Pollard (6/8) 10', 26', 39', 40'+3', 46', 58'

International Stadium Yokohama, Yokohama
Attendance: 70,103
Referee: Jérôme Garcès (France)

England	South Africa

FB	15	Elliot Daly
RW	14	Anthony Watson
OC	13	Manu Tuilagi
IC	12	Owen Farrell (c)
LW	11	Jonny May	(substituted off) 69'
FH	10	George Ford	(substituted off) 49'
SH	9	Ben Youngs	(substituted off) 75'
N8	8	Billy Vunipola
OF	7	Sam Underhill	(substituted off) 59'
BF	6	Tom Curry
RL	5	Courtney Lawes	(substituted off) 40'
LL	4	Maro Itoje
TP	3	Kyle Sinckler	(substituted off) 2'
HK	2	Jamie George	(substituted off) 59'
LP	1	Mako Vunipola	(substituted off) 45'
Replacements:
HK	16	Luke Cowan-Dickie	(substituted on) 59'
PR	17	Joe Marler	(substituted on) 45'
PR	18	Dan Cole	(substituted on) 2'
LK	19	George Kruis	(substituted on) 40'
FL	20	Mark Wilson	(substituted on) 59'
SH	21	Ben Spencer	(substituted on) 75'
CE	22	Henry Slade	(substituted on) 49'
CE	23	Jonathan Joseph	(substituted on) 69'
Coach:
(Australia) Eddie Jones

FB	15	Willie le Roux	(substituted off) 67'
RW	14	Cheslin Kolbe
OC	13	Lukhanyo Am
IC	12	Damian de Allende
LW	11	Makazole Mapimpi
FH	10	Handré Pollard
SH	9	Faf de Klerk	(substituted off) 76'
N8	8	Duane Vermeulen
BF	7	Pieter-Steph du Toit
OF	6	Siya Kolisi (c)	(substituted off) 63'
RL	5	Lood de Jager	(substituted off) 21'
LL	4	Eben Etzebeth	(substituted off) 59'
TP	3	Frans Malherbe	(substituted off) 43'
HK	2	Bongi Mbonambi	(substituted off) 21'
LP	1	Tendai Mtawarira	(substituted off) 43'
Replacements:
HK	16	Malcolm Marx	(substituted on) 21'
PR	17	Steven Kitshoff	(substituted on) 43'
PR	18	Vincent Koch	(substituted on) 43'
LK	19	RG Snyman	(substituted on) 59'
LK	20	Franco Mostert	(substituted on) 21'
FL	21	Francois Louw	(substituted on) 63'
SH	22	Herschel Jantjies	(substituted on) 76'
CE	23	François Steyn	(substituted on) 67'
Coach:
(South Africa) Rassie Erasmus

Player of the Match:
Duane Vermeulen (South Africa)

Assistant referees:
Romain Poite (France)
Ben O'Keeffe (New Zealand)
Television match official:
Ben Skeen (New Zealand)
Sideline official:
Nigel Owens (Wales)

Notes:

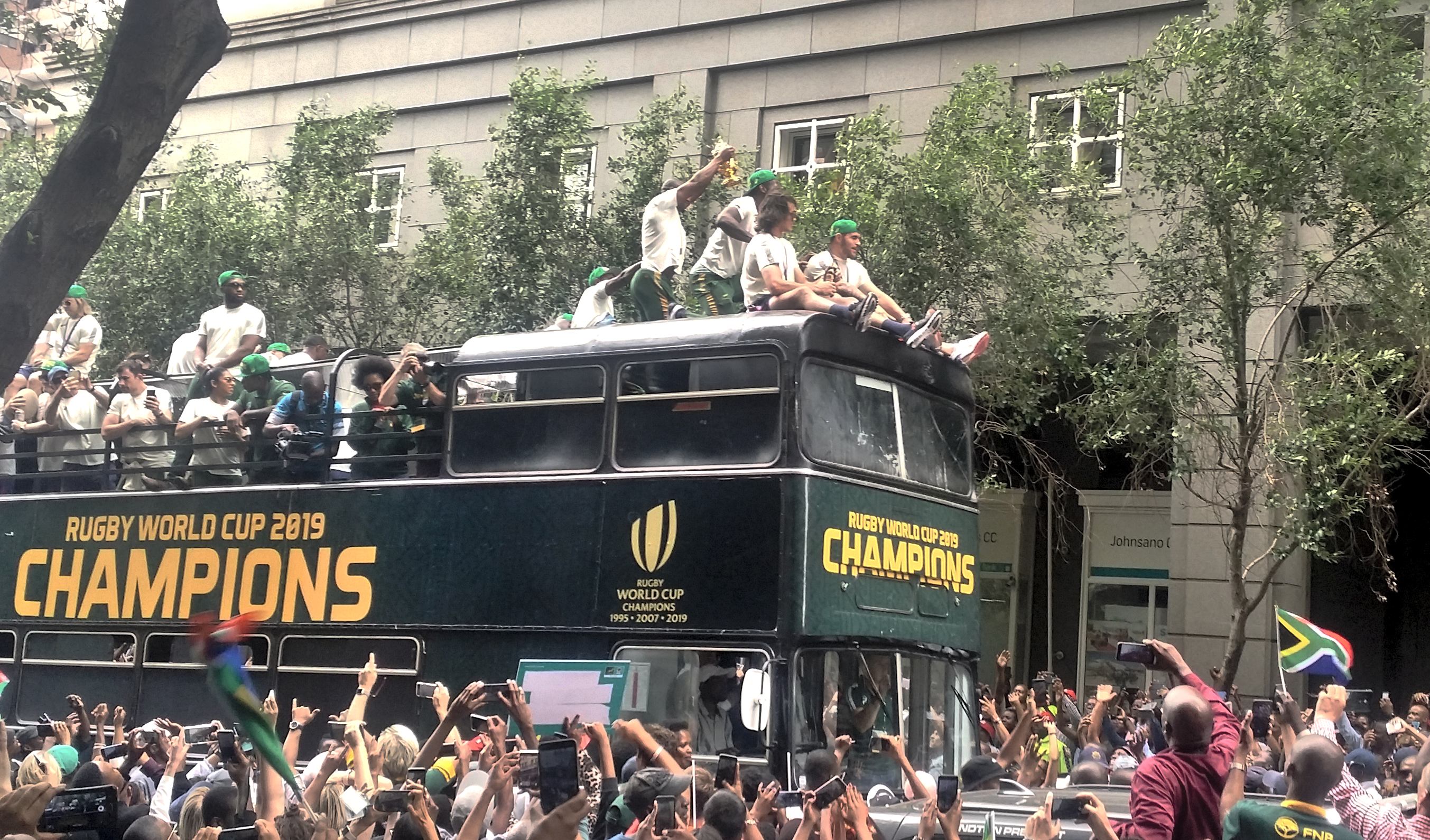
South Africa's victory parade after the World Cup

- Siya Kolisi (South Africa) earned his 50th test cap.
- François Steyn (South Africa) became the second Springbok player to win two World Cups. The first, Os du Randt, was on the Boks' victorious 1995 team and was also a teammate of Steyn in 2007.
- Jérôme Garcès became the first French referee to take charge of a Rugby World Cup final.
- South Africa became the first Southern Hemisphere team to win The Rugby Championship (previously the Tri Nations) and the Rugby World Cup in the same year.
- South Africa became the first team to win the Rugby World Cup having lost a match during the pool stage.
- This was the first final in which South Africa scored a try, and the one in which they scored the most points, more than they had in their previous two finals combined. It was also the most points England had scored in a final when finishing on the losing side.
- England and South Africa became the third pair of nations to face each other on two occasions in a World Cup final (previously having contested the 2007 final) after England and Australia (1991 and 2003), as well as France and New Zealand (1987 and 2011).
- South Africa is, at 2019, the only nation to have contested at least one World Cup final never to have lost.
- England joined France on a record three losses in World Cup finals.
- This victory meant South Africa climb to the top of the World Rugby Rankings for the first time since 2009, it also meant England dropped to third. South Africa were the fifth team to top the rankings in 2019, with New Zealand, Ireland, Wales and England all reaching number 1 at various points between June and November.

== See also ==
- History of rugby union matches between England and South Africa
