= John Liley =

England international rugby union player

- Born: John Garin Liley; 21 August 1967 (age 59) Wakefield, England
- Notable relative: Rob Liley (Brother)

Rugby union career
- Position: Full Back
Senior career
Years	Team	Apps	(Points)
?–1988	Wakefield RFC		
1988–97	Leicester Tigers	230	(2518)
1997–98	Moseley		
1998–99	Worcester		
1999—?	Doncaster		
International career
Years	Team	Apps	(Points)
1990	England	0	(0)

John Garin Liley (born 21 August 1967) is an English former rugby union player. A full back who played 230 games for Leicester Tigers from 1988 to 1997 scoring 2,518 points, the second most of all time, he also toured with England but did not play in a test match.

== Career ==
Liley was born in Wakefield, and joined Leicester from Wakefield RFC. He made his Leicester debut as a replacement against Orrell on 8 October 1988 at Welford Road. His first season overlapped the last season of Dusty Hare which limited Liley to only 4 starts and one further appearance from the bench. Liley was the first choice full back for Leicester's pre-season tour to Colorado, United States, in 1989 scoring a hat-trick of tries against Vail and scoring 8 points as Tigers lost to the USA national side.

In 1989-90, his first season as first choice full back, Liley played 33 games and scored 439 points; this broke Hare's record for points scored in a season by a single point. Liley was to break the record again with 446 points in 1995-96. Belying his reputation as a kicking full back Liley scored 18 tries in that 1989-90 season leading to his selection for England's summer tour to Argentina. He played in 4 of the 7 matches on tour, scoring 15 points, but did not feature in either international to gain his cap.

Against Romania on 4 September 1990 Liley became the quickest Leicester Tigers player to 500 points after only 43 games. Against Orrell on 29 February 1992 he became the quickest Tigers player to 1,000 points after only 92 games. Both records have subsequently been broken by Joel Stransky and Tim Stimpson respectively. Against Exeter on 23 December 1995 he became only the second player to score 2,000 points for Leicester Tigers.

Liley played in the Pilkington Cup Finals of 1993 and 1996, winning the 1993 final against Harlequins and losing in 1996 to Bath. Liley was also part of the Leicester side which won the league in 1995. He played in 1997 Heineken Cup Final which Leicester lost to Brive.

After the 1996-97 season Liley was considered surplus to requirements by then Leicester coach Bob Dwyer, initially he joined Moseley in the second division but financial difficulties meant a quick move to Worcester who at the time were in the third tier. Liley spent a season and a half at Sixways helping the club to promotion before moving onto a player-coach role at Doncaster. He also coached Leicester's sevens side at the 2000 Middlesex Sevens tournament. Since 2009 Liley has been expert summariser on BBC Radio Leeds covering Yorkshire Carnegie games alongside Gareth Jones, son of Leicester Tigers legend Bleddyn Jones.

Liley, for 13 years was the Director of Sports for independent school Cundall Manor School, located in North Yorkshire. He is currently working at Highfield Prep School, Harrogate.

== Sources ==
Farmer, Stuart & Hands, David Tigers-Official History of Leicester Football Club (The Rugby DevelopmentFoundation ISBN 978-0-9930213-0-5)
