= Matt Poole =

England international rugby union player

- Born: Matthew David Poole; 6 February 1969 (age 57) Leicester, England
- Height: 6 ft 6 in (198 cm)
- Weight: 272 lb (123 kg)
- School: Roundhill College

Rugby union career
- Position: Lock
Senior career
Years	Team	Apps	(Points)
1988–1998	Leicester Tigers	223	(95)
International career
Years	Team	Apps	(Points)
1990;1994	England	0	(0)

Matthew David Poole (born 6 February 1969) is a former rugby union lock who played 223 games for Leicester Tigers from 1988 to 1998, he also toured twice with England but did not play in a test match.

== Career ==
=== Beginnings ===
Born in Leicester, Poole was a product of the Leicester youth team and played for England Colts and the inaugural England under 21s team. He made his Tigers debut on 18 October 1988 against Oxford University and featured in 5 games that season including making his Courage League debut against Moseley from the bench.

=== Leicester and England ===
Poole established himself in the side the 1989/90 with 24 appearances and was selected that summer to tour Argentina. He played in 3 of the 7 matches on tour but did not feature in either international to gain his cap. Despite making his Leicester debut in the same season, 1988/89, as fellow lock Martin Johnson the pair did not start a game together until 5 November 1991 against Cambridge University. They went on to play together 129 times, a club record for a second row partnership.

On 1 September 1992 against Sheffield Poole scored Leicester's first 5-point try, following the increase in its value.

Poole played in the Pilkington Cup Finals of 1993, 1994, 1996, where he scored a try, and 1997 winning 2 and losing 2 of the games. Poole was also part of the Leicester side which won the league in 1995. He played in 1997 Heineken Cup Final which Leicester lost to Brive.

Poole toured with England again in 1994 when they traveled to South Africa. But again was not selected for either test match.

=== Retirement ===
Poole's career ended in 1998 because of ankle and pelvic injuries. His final appearance was on 7 November 1998 against Bath at Welford Road. Poole played more matches in the letter "E" shirt than any other player in the club's history. He wore the jersey 192 times.

In February 2009 Poole was voted by readers of the Leicester Mercury into Leicester Tigers's Walk of Legends alongside his long term playing partner Martin Johnson.

== Sources ==
- Farmer, Stuart; Hands, David (1993). The Tigers Tale. ISBN 978-0-9514862-5-2.
