= Rob Liley =

English rugby union player

- Born: Robert James Liley; 3 April 1970 (age 56) Wakefield, England
- Notable relative: John Liley

Rugby union career
- Position: Fly Half
Senior career
Years	Team	Apps	(Points)
1995–96	Sale	18	(167)
1996–97	Leicester	27	(167)
1997–2000	Harlequins	42	(222)
2000–02	Wakefield	44	(377)
2002–06	Doncaster	88	(1,019)
1995–2006	Total	219	(1,952)

Robert James Liley (born 3 April 1970) is an English former rugby union player. A fly half he played professionally for Sale, Leicester Tigers, Harlequins, Wakefield and Doncaster. He was the starting fly half for Leicester in the 1997 Heineken Cup Final.

== Career ==
=== Leicester ===
Liley moved to Leicester Tigers in 1996 to join his brother John. He made his debut on 25 August 1996 against Boroughmuir at Welford Road and scored 27 points, a club record for a player on debut. He was Leicester's starting fly half in every game during the 1996-97 Heineken Cup, scoring a try in the quarter final victory over Harlequins. Liley started the 1997 Heineken Cup Final for Leicester as they lost 28-9 to CA Brive. After the signing of Joel Stransky in February 1997 Liley fell out of favour at Leicester and at the end of the season he moved on to Harlequins.

=== Representative ===
In May 2001 Liley was part of the Yorkshire side which won the County Championship with a 47-19 win over Cornwall at Twickenham. In October 2001 Liley was named in the squad for England National Divisions (made up of players from clubs outside the top division) for their match against Australia.
