= Dean Richards (rugby union) =

British Lions & England international rugby union player

Dean Richards MBE
- Born: Dean Richards; 11 July 1963 (age 63) Nuneaton, England
- Height: 1.91 m (6 ft 3 in)
- Weight: 121 kg (19 st 1 lb)
- School: John Cleveland College
- Occupation: Rugby union coach

Rugby union career
- Position: Number eight
Senior career
Years	Team	Apps	(Points)
1982–1997	Leicester Tigers	314	(431)
International career
Years	Team	Apps	(Points)
1986–1996	England	48	(24)
1989, 1993	British Lions	6	(0)
Coaching career
- Years: Team
- 1998–2004: Leicester Tigers
- 2004–2005: FC Grenoble
- 2005–2009: Harlequins
- 2012–2022: Newcastle Falcons
- 2016–present: Wymondham RFC

Dean Richards (born 11 July 1963) is a rugby union coach and former player for Leicester Tigers, England and British & Irish Lions. He was most recently the Director of Rugby at Newcastle Falcons, a position he held for ten years between 2012 and 2022.

Richards was a number eight and played 314 games for Leicester Tigers between 1982 and 1997, he was captain as Leicester won the 1994-95 Courage League and the 1997 Pilkington Cup, and also played as Leicester won the inaugural English league title in 1987–88 and the 1993 Pilkington Cup. He played 48 times for England between 1986 and 1996, a world record number of caps for his position at the time, including the 1987, 1991 and 1995 Rugby World Cups, and represented the British Lions on their 1989 tour to Australia and 1993 tour to New Zealand playing in six international matches. He was widely regarded as one of the best number eights to have played the game.

In 1998 he retired from playing and was immediately appointed Leicester Director of Rugby. Leicester won the Premiership Rugby title in Richards' first four seasons in charge and also won the Heineken Cup in 2001 and 2002, the first side to retain the trophy. Richards spent one year with FC Grenoble in France's Top 16. He then joined Harlequins from 2005 to 2009, winning the second division in 2006, and leading them to second in the Premiership in 2009. He was banned from coaching for the next three years following the Bloodgate scandal. After the expiration of his ban he was appointed by Newcastle Falcons and won the second division again in 2013.

== Playing career ==
=== Junior honours and Leicester debut ===
Richards was schooled at John Cleveland College, in Hinckley, and was capped three times for England Schools in 1981. He played for Roanne in France for a year before returning to England to play for Leicester Tigers.

Richards made his debut for Leicester as an 18 year old on 10 April 1982 in a match against Neath RFC. He began playing regularly for the side the following season, replacing Nick Jackson as Tigers regular number eight Richards started 25 of final 28 games of the 1982–83 season including all five rounds of 1982–83 John Player Cup as Leicester reached the final only to lose to Bristol. He played for the Barbarians in 1983 and was selected the same year for the England's Under-23s tour to Romania.

=== 1983–89: England debut, first Leicester title and Lions ===
Richards continued in as a regular in Leicester's backrow and was the club's top try scorer with 20 tries in both the 1985–86 season, and 1986–87. He made his senior England debut on 1 March 1986, against Ireland at Twickenham in the 1986 Five Nations Championship, scoring two tries in a 25–20 points win. Richards played in four matches at the inaugural Rugby World Cup in 1987.

After the 1988 Five Nations Championship match between Scotland and England Richards received a one match ban from the Rugby Football Union after an incident post match which damaged the Calcutta Cup. Richards won the first club silverware of his career when Leicester beat Waterloo to win the 1987–88 Courage League, England's first official league title. Richards was selected alongside three other Leicester players for England's tour of Australia and Fiji. Injuries limited Richards to only 15 appearances for Leicester in 1988–89, though he was able to feature in the losing 1988–89 Pilkington Cup final against Bath, before being selected for the 1989 British Lions tour to Australia. Richards played in all three tests for the Lions and his powerful mauling play was the bedrock of the Lions success.

=== 1989–94: Grandslams, Cup win and Lions tour ===
On his return from Australia Richards was appointed Leicester captain but injured his shoulder in only the second match of the season, the injury proved so serious he missed the rest of the 1989–90 season. He returned to fitness for the 1990–91 season and resumed the captaincy of Leicester, leading Leicester to fourth in the 1990–91 Courage League. Internationally Richards started all four of England's games in their 1991 Five Nations grandslam, toured Australia and Fiji and was named in England's 1991 World Cup squad. Richards was controversially dropped after a pool stage victory against the United States as England made the final but lost to Australia. Richards was recalled for England during the 1992 Five Nations Championship, where they won a second successive grandslam.

Due to injury to Martin Johnson, Richards started the 1992–93 season in Leicester's second row, but returned to his accustomed position of number eight by the time of the 1992–93 Pilkington Cup first round match against London Scottish. Richards started all five matches as Tigers won the cup, including scoring tries in both the quarter and semi-final. Despite not being selected for England in the 1993 Five Nations Championship, Richards was picked for the 1993 British Lions tour to New Zealand and started in all three test matches. He also captained the Lions in a non-cap match against Canterbury. After the tour Richards was again appointed Leicester's captain, a position he held until he retired.

=== 1994–97 Club and international success to retirement ===
Richards only scored one try for Leicester in the 1994–95 season but it was a significant one, on 27 December 1994 he scored his 100th try for the club becoming only the second forward to do so after David Matthews. That season Leicester also went on to win the 1994-95 Courage League, Richards played in the final game of the season and as captained lifted Leicester's second league title at Welford Road.

In international rugby Richards was an ever-present for England in their 1995 grandslam, his third. He was selected in England's 1995 World Cup squad, overlooked for the first two group stage matches he was recalled for the final pool game against Samoa and played in the quarter-final against Australia and the semi-final against New Zealand.

The 1995–96 season was one of near misses for Leicester as they lost the 1995-96 Courage League on the last day of the season with a home defeat to Harlequins and then lost the 1996 Pilkington Cup Final to Bath with a controversial last minute penalty try. The following season, Richards led Leicester to their first Heineken Cup final against Brive, at Cardiff Arms Park, which was won by Brive by 28 points to nine. Richards made his 300th appearance for Leicester on 25 February 1997 in a match at Welford Road against the Barbarians. The final match in his career was played on 30 December 1997, against Newcastle Falcons, at Welford Road.

== Personal life ==
Richards was a police constable for Leicestershire Constabulary between the 1980s and 1990s before English rugby union became professional.

In 1995, he received an Honorary Master of Arts award from Loughborough University.

He was appointed MBE in the 1996 New Year Honours.

== Coaching career ==
=== Leicester ===
Richards took over from Bob Dwyer as coach of Leicester in 1998, and in his first full season as Director of Rugby won the Allied Dunbar Premiership, the third time in club history. Tigers successfully defended the title for four consecutive seasons under him. Leicester also won two Heineken Cups, defeating Stade Français 34–30 in 2001 and beating Munster 15–9 in 2002. After two trophy-less seasons and a failure to get out of the pool in Europe, Richards left the club in February 2004, ending a 23-year association with the club.

=== Grenoble ===
In June 2004, Richards was appointed as coach at French club FC Grenoble for the following season. Grenoble struggled in the French rugby championship and it was announced in May 2005 that Richards would leave the club at the end of the season by mutual consent.

=== Harlequins ===
He was appointed Director of Rugby at Harlequins in May 2005 following their relegation from the Zurich Premiership in the 2004–05 season, and led them back to the Premiership at the first attempt, in a season where they lost only one league game.

=== Bloodgate ===
Richards resigned from Harlequins in August 2009 after an incident which became known as Bloodgate. He had orchestrated and had "central control" over a fake blood injury to Harlequins player Tom Williams to bring a more experienced replacement kicker onto the field during a Heineken Cup match against Leinster. With the game poised at 6-5 late in the second half, a successful penalty kick would have resulted in a place in the semifinals for Harlequins. Richards was found to have been involved in four similar incidents, and was banned from coaching for three seasons.

Harlequins were fined £259,000, and Williams was banned for four months. Harlequins' physiotherapist Steph Brennan was banned for two years. The doctor involved, Wendy Chapman, who cut the player's lip to try to cover up the incident, was reprimanded by the Medical Council, but escaped a ban.

=== Newcastle ===
In spring 2012 Richards was named Director of Rugby at Newcastle Falcons when his ban ended in August and, as he had with Harlequins, led Newcastle to promotion back to the Premiership at the first attempt.

Richards led the Falcons to an 8th-place finish in the 2016-17 Aviva Premiership, with Falcons ending up just 3 points off the top 6. This was their best finish in 11 years, and their biggest number of wins in 15 years.

In May 2022, it was announced that Richards would be stepping down as Director of Rugby at the end of the season but continuing to work as a part-time consultant for the Falcons.

== Sources ==
- Farmer, Stuart; Hands, David (2014). Tigers – Official history of Leicester Football Club. The Rugby Development Foundation. ISBN 978-0-9930213-0-5.
