= 1995–96 Pilkington Cup =

English rugby union competition

Tournament statistics
- Champions: Bath (10th title)

The 1995–96 Pilkington Cup was the 25th edition of England's premier rugby union club competition. Bath won the competition defeating Leicester in the final. The attendance of 75,000 was a world record for a rugby union match. The final ended in controversy after the referee Steve Lander awarded a penalty try in the last minute of the match which sealed victory for Bath. The event was sponsored by Pilkington and the final was held at Twickenham Stadium.

== Draw and results ==
=== First round (Sep 9) ===
Team one	Team two	Score
Askeans	Brixham	30-18
Basingstoke	Berry Hill	20-11
Bridlington	Syston	34-10
Broadstreet	Wharfedale	26-21
Camberley	Barking	26-24
Ealing	Weston-Super-Mare	8-26
Gloucester Old Boys	Camborne	25-8
Harlow	Abbey	41-6
Henley	Ruislip	30-8
High Wycombe	Cheltenham	0-15
Hornets	Bournemouth	34-23
Hull Ionians	Selly Oak	52-8
Launceston	Metropolitan Police	10-16
Leighton Buzzard	Birmingham	11-29
Lewes	Oxford	24-17
Macclesfield	Sandal	47-17
Manchester	Scunthorpe	15-22
North Walsham	Letchworth	23-12
Northern	Sheffield	22-10
Nuneaton	Winnington Park	26-32 aet
Old Blues	Tabard	5-11
Olney	Westcombe Park	0-23
Preston Grasshoppers	Stourbridge	19-44
Stafford	Netherall	13-18
Stockton	Broughton Park	13-11
Stoke	Lichfield	13-11
Sudbury	Lydney	6-28
Worcester	Kendal	30-17

=== Second round (Oct 7) ===
Team one	Team two	Score
Basingstoke	Lewes	19-28
Birmingham	Worcester	14-19
Bridlington	Aspatria	50-10
Cheltenham	Weston-Super-Mare	11-13
Clifton	Metropolitan Police	11-12
Gloucester Old Boys	London Welsh	7-16
Harrogate	Fylde	6-23
Havant	Exeter	11-20
Henley	Hornets	33-8
Liverpool St Helens	Hull Ionians	15-8
Lydney	Harlow	37-7
Macclesfield	Morley	18-6
Netherall	Winnington Park	7-17
Northern	Stourbridge	21-22
Otley	Stoke	16-11
Plymouth	Camberley	18-39
Redruth	North Walsham	19-15
Rosslyn Park	Richmond	14-22
Rotherham	Coventry	15-24
Scunthorpe	Walsall	18-49
Stockton	Leeds	8-27
Tabard	Askeans	28-15
Westcombe Park	Reading	9-32

=== Third round (Nov 4) ===
Team one	Team two	Score
Bridlington	Winnington Park	13-17
Coventry	Stourbridge	78-20
Exeter	Redruth	17-15
Leeds	Fylde	12-6
Lewes	Camberley	10-40
London Welsh	Richmond	27-12
Macclesfield	Walsall	35-36
Metropolitan Police	Reading	10-27
Otley	Rugby	31-40
Tabard	Lydney	17-19
Weston-Super-Mare	Henley	19-18
Worcester	Liverpool St Helens	24-8

=== Fourth round (Dec 23) ===
Team one	Team two	Score
Bath	Northampton	12-3
Bedford	Worcester	27-12
Blackheath	Coventry	9-19
Camberley	Wakefield	0-18
Exeter	Leicester	0-27
Gloucester	Walsall	47-0
Leeds	Waterloo	20-15
London Irish	London Welsh	21-3
Newcastle	Moseley	26-5
Nottingham	London Scottish	32-16
Orrell	Harlequins	17-19
Reading	Bristol	7-44
Sale	Wasps	9-18
Saracens	Rugby	27-7
Weston-Super-Mare	West Hartlepool	9-25
Winnington Park	Lydney	26-11

=== Fifth round (Jan 27 & Feb 10) ===
Team one	Team two	Score
Bedford	Bristol	0-37
Leeds	London Irish	13-29
Leicester	Saracens	40-16
Newcastle Gosforth	Harlequins	22-44
Nottingham	Gloucester	10-36
Wakefield	Bath	12-16
West Hartlepool	Coventry	16-6
Winnington Park	Wasps	0-57

=== Quarter-finals (Feb 24) ===
Team one	Team two	Score
London Irish	West Hartlepool	11-10
Gloucester	Wasps	22-9
Leicester	Harlequins	24-9
Bristol	Bath	12-19

=== Semi-finals (Mar 23) ===
Team one	Team two	Score
London Irish	Leicester	21-46
Bath	Gloucester	19-10

=== Final ===
4 May 1996

Bath	16–15	Leicester
Try: Penalty try Con: Callard; Pen: Callard 2 Drop: Catt		Try: Malone; Poole; Con: Liley; Pen: Liley

Twickenham Stadium, London
Attendance: 75,000 (World Record)
Referee: Steve Lander (Liverpool)

Bath
Leicester

16	Jon Callard
15	Audley Lumsden
14	Phil de Glanville (c)
12	Adedayo Adebayo
11	Jon Sleightholme
10	Mike Catt
9	Andy Nicol
8	Eric Peters
7	Steve Ojomoh
6	Andy Robinson
5	Nigel Redman
4	Martin Haag
3	John Mallett
2	Graham Dawe
1	Dave Hilton
Replacements:
16	Richard Butland
17	Ian Sanders
18	Darren Crompton
19	Neil McCarthy
20	Andy Reed
21	Ed Pearce
Coach:
Brian Ashton

O	John Liley
N	Steve Hackney
M	Stuart Potter
L	Richie Robinson
K	Rory Underwood
J	Niall Malone
I	Aadel Kardooni
G	Dean Richards (c)
H	Neil Back
F	John Wells
E	Matt Poole
D	Martin Johnson
C	Darren Garforth
B	Richard Cockerill
A	Graham Rowntree
Replacements:
P	Jez Harris
Q	Jamie Hamilton
R	Derek Jelley
S	Dorian West
T	Chris Tarbuck
U	Bill Drake-Lee
Coach:
