= Laurent Seigne =

French rugby union player (born 1960)

- Born: 12 August 1960 (age 66) Tulle, France
- Height: 5 ft 10 in (178 cm)
- Weight: 227 lb (103 kg)

Rugby union career
- Position: Prop
International career
Years	Team	Apps	(Points)
1989–95	France	15	(0)

Laurent Seigne (born 12 August 1960) is a French former rugby union coach and international player.

Born in Tulle, Seigne was a junior at both ASPO Brive and Stade Clermontois.

Seigne, a prop, was known for his toughness and played in SU Agen's French Championship-winning team of 1988. It was from that club that he gained the first of his 15 France caps in 1989, in a match against the British Lions. In 1993, Seigne featured in all four Tests for France in their victorious Five Nations campaign. He was a used player for France's historic series win over the All Blacks on the 1994 tour of New Zealand. By the time he retired in 1995, Seigne had played senior rugby for five French clubs, US Cognac, SU Agen, RC Narbonne, Mérignac and CA Brive.

As a coach, Seigne had his first assignment with CA Brive and led the club to the 1996–97 Heineken Cup title. After two year as an assistant coach at Gloucester, he returned to France, where he had stints as head coach with CS Bourgoin-Jallieu and Castres Olympique, as well as a second spell at CA Brive.

== See also ==
- List of France national rugby union players
