= Dave Egerton =

England international rugby union player (1961–2021)

David Egerton
- Born: David William Egerton; 19 October 1961 Pinner, Middlesex, England, United Kingdom
- Died: 8 February 2021 (aged 59) Bristol, England, United Kingdom
- University: Loughborough University

Rugby union career
- Position: No. 8
Amateur team(s)
Years	Team	Apps	(Points)
1980-1982	Salisbury		
1981-1984	Loughborough Students		
Senior career
Years	Team	Apps	(Points)
1985–1995	Bath Rugby	163	
- Correct as of 9 February 2021
International career
Years	Team	Apps	(Points)
1988–1990	England	7	(4)
1989	British and Irish Lions	1	
- Correct as of 9 February 2021

David William Egerton (19 October 1961 – 8 February 2021) was an English rugby union international who represented England from 1988 to 1990. At club level, Egerton played for Bath Rugby between 1985 and 1995 . After retiring, Egerton worked briefly as a coach for Bristol and Bridgwater & Albion before focusing on building his career in financial services.

== Early life ==
David Egerton was born on 19 October 1961 in Pinner, Middlesex, and from 1973 to 1980 attended Bishop Wordsworth's School. His father Bob, and later his brother Andrew, both represented Wasps FC. Starting out as a lock, Egerton soon switched to the back row and primarily played as a number 8.

== Rugby union career ==
As a schoolboy Egerton was capped for England U16 and U19 before going on to study at Loughborough University, where he played for English Universities and England Students rugby teams.

Egerton made 163 appearances for Bath Rugby between 1985 and 1995. He won five league titles, and five cup competitions with Bath, and helped them win the 1990 Pilkington Cup. He averaged one try every three games for Bath.

Egerton won additional honours for Dorset and Wilts County Championship Team (1982), South West Division in the Divisional Championship (1985-86) and England B (1986-1988).

Egerton was selected for the England squad which went to the inaugural 1987 Rugby World Cup but did not make an appearance instead making his international debut on 23 April 1988 at Lansdowne Road against Ireland. Later the same year he was selected for the England tour of Australia and Fiji. Of the seven matches he played for the national side he was on the winning side on five times. He scored one international try, which came at Twickenham against Ireland in the opening round of the 1990 Five Nations Championship. He played his final match for England on 4 August 1990 at José Amalfitani Stadium against Argentina in the last match of the 1990 tour. Egerton was selected once again for the England squad at the 1991 Rugby World Cup, but was forced to pull out with injury.

Egerton was selected for the British and Irish Lions who defeated France at Parc des Princes in October 1989 in a non-cap Test and also played for the Barbarians, making his debut for the club in the 1990 Lisbon Sevens tournament.

== Post-retirement ==
After retiring as a player, Egerton became head coach of Bridgwater & Albion (1995-1997). He scouted Richard Hill, who went to the same secondary school as Egerton had, and invited him to a Bath training session. Ahead of the 1997–98 season, Egerton joined Bristol as a coach of the United /Development XV. In February 1998, Egerton became joint caretaker coach of Bristol, alongside Darryl Jones. The next month, he was appointed an assistant coach. He left the role during the 1998–99 season for personal reasons.

Egerton later commentated for BBC Radio Bristol, and also worked in the financial sector in Hong Kong during which time he coached Hong Kong Football Club (2011-2015) Egerton returned to the United Kingdom in 2017, and lived in Clifton, Bristol with his wife, son and daughter.

== Death ==
Egerton died on 8 February 2021 after being hospitalised with COVID-19 during the COVID-19 pandemic in England.
