= History of rugby union matches between Argentina and England =

The national rugby union teams of England and Argentina (Los Pumas) have been playing each other since 1978. The status of the first match is ambiguous, as Argentina awarded Test caps to its players but England did not (England sent a representative "England XV", not the 1st XV). They have met in 31 matches recognised by both sides as Tests. The first match was part of a two-test series in Argentina and was played on 30 May 1981 and ended in a 19–19 draw. The second match of the two-test series was played on 6 June 1981 and was won by England 12–6. The 1982 Falklands War between Britain and Argentina meant that their next encounter did not take place until 1990. Excluding the ambiguous 1978 game, Argentina and England have played each other 31 times with England winning 25, Argentina 5 with 1 drawn.

The rugby rivalry between the two countries is not known for being as intense as their football rivalry.

== Summary ==
=== Overall ===
Details	Played	Won by Argentina	Won by England	Drawn	Argentina points	England points
In Argentina	15	3	11	1	288	420
In England	11	2	9	0	154	296
Neutral venue	5	0	5	0	70	129
Overall	31	5	25	1	512	845

=== Records ===
Note: Date shown in brackets indicates when the record was last set.

Record	Argentina	England
Longest winning streak	1 (7 June 1997 – 25 November 2000) (Note: Argentina have never defeated England in consecutive matches. The longest period of time following a win over England, however, was 3 years and 171 days.)	10 (14 November 2009 – 6 November 2022)
Largest points for
Home	34 (10 June 2017)	51 (3 November 1990)
Away	30 (6 November 2022)	51 (15 June 2013)
Largest winning margin
Home	20 (7 June 1997)	51 (3 November 1990)
Away	7 (11 November 2006)	29 (8 June 2013; 5 October 2019)

== Results ==
No.	Date	Venue	Score	Winner	Competition	Ref.
1	30 May 1981	Ferro Carril Oeste, Buenos Aires	19–19	draw	1981 England tour of Argentina	
2	6 June 1981	Ferro Carril Oeste, Buenos Aires	6–12	England	1981 England tour of Argentina	
3	28 July 1990	José Amalfitani Stadium, Buenos Aires	12–25	England	1990 England tour of Argentina	
4	4 August 1990	José Amalfitani Stadium, Buenos Aires	15–13	Argentina	1990 England tour of Argentina	
5	3 November 1990	Twickenham Stadium, London	51–0	England	1990 Argentina tour of Great Britain and Ireland	
6	27 May 1995	Kings Park Stadium, Durban (South Africa)	24–18	England	1995 Rugby World Cup	
7	14 December 1996	Twickenham Stadium, London	20–18	England	1996 Argentina tour of England	
8	31 May 1997	Ferro Carril Oeste, Buenos Aires	20–46	England	1997 England tour of Argentina and Australia	
9	7 June 1997	Ferro Carril Oeste, Buenos Aires	33–13	Argentina	1997 England tour of Argentina and Australia	
10	25 November 2000	Twickenham Stadium, London	19–0	England	2000 end-of-year rugby union internationals	
11	22 June 2002	José Amalfitani Stadium, Buenos Aires	18–26	England	2002 England tour of Argentina	
12	11 November 2006	Twickenham Stadium, London	18–25	Argentina	2006 end-of-year rugby union internationals	
13	6 June 2009	Old Trafford, Manchester	37–15	England	2009 England–Argentina tour	
14	13 June 2009	Estadio Padre Ernesto Martearena, Salta	24–22	Argentina	2009 England–Argentina tour	
15	14 November 2009	Twickenham Stadium, London	16–9	England	2009 end-of-year rugby union internationals	
16	10 September 2011	Forsyth Barr Stadium, Dunedin (New Zealand)	13–9	England	2011 Rugby World Cup	
17	8 June 2013	Estadio Padre Ernesto Martearena, Salta	3–32	England	2013 England tour of Argentina and Uruguay	
18	15 June 2013	José Amalfitani Stadium, Buenos Aires	26–51	England	2013 England tour of Argentina and Uruguay	
19	9 November 2013	Twickenham Stadium, London	31–12	England	2013 end-of-year rugby union internationals	
20	26 November 2016	Twickenham Stadium, London	27–14	England	2016 end-of-year rugby union internationals	
21	10 June 2017	Estadio San Juan del Bicentenario, San Juan	34–38	England	2017 England tour of Argentina	
22	17 June 2017	Estadio Brigadier General Estanislao López, Santa Fe	25–35	England	2017 England tour of Argentina	
23	11 November 2017	Twickenham Stadium, London	21–8	England	2017 end-of-year rugby union internationals	
24	5 October 2019	Tokyo Stadium, Chōfu (Japan)	39–10	England	2019 Rugby World Cup	
25	6 November 2022	Twickenham Stadium, London	29–30	Argentina	2022 end-of-year rugby union internationals	
26	9 September 2023	Stade Vélodrome, Marseille (France)	27–10	England	2023 Rugby World Cup	
27	27 October 2023	Stade de France, Saint-Denis (France)	23–26	England	2023 Rugby World Cup	
28	5 July 2025	Estadio Jorge Luis Hirschi, Buenos Aires	12–35	England	2025 England tour of Argentina and the United States	
29	12 July 2025	Estadio San Juan del Bicentenario, San Juan	17–22	England	2025 England tour of Argentina and the United States	
30	23 November 2025	Twickenham Stadium, London	27–23	England	2025 end-of-year rugby union internationals	
31	18 July 2026	Estadio Único Madre de Ciudades, Santiago del Estero	24–31	England	2026 Nations Championship	

== Non-test results ==
Below is a list of matches that Argentina has awarded matches test match status by virtue of awarding caps, but England did not.

Date	Venue	Score	Winner	Competition
14 October 1978 (Note: Not classed as a full international by England who played as an England XV, 12 players from the XV played against the All Blacks one month later.)	Twickenham Stadium, London	13–13	draw	1978 Argentina tour of Great Britain, Ireland and Italy
17 June 2002	Buenos Aires CRC Field, Los Polvorines	29–24	Argentina XV	2002 England tour of Argentina

== List of series ==
Played	Won by Argentina	Won by England	Drawn
8	0	5	3

Year	Argentina	Australia	Series winner
1981	0	1	England
1990	1	1	Draw
1997	1	1	Draw
2002	0	1	England
2009	1	1	Draw
2013	0	2	England
2017	0	2	England
2025	0	2	England
