= Young Bristol =

Charity in Bristol, England

- Predecessor: Bristol Boys & Girls Club
- Formation: 1928
- Legal status: Charity
- Headquarters: BS14 Youth Centre
- Location: Bristol
- Coordinates: 51.4574°N 2.5925°W
- Parent organization: Boys and Girls Club National Association
- Website: http://youngbristol.com/

Young Bristol is a charity in Bristol, England providing activities for young people in the city.

The organisation was founded in 1928, building on the Bristol Boys & Girls Club.

It now runs 8 youth clubs and provides community-based youth services including outdoor activities, mobile youth services, creative arts, outdoor employment, and informal educational programmes for young people. One of the largest clubs is the Broad Plain Boys' Club where the building was adorned with a Banksy mural. This was later sold, with the permission of Banksy, to raise money for the club. The records of many of the constituent clubs are held by Bristol Archives.

It is a registered charity Number: 301681 and the local county organisation of the Boys and Girls Club National Association. The headquarters was the old fire station, which is part of the same complex as the Central Police Station, a Grade II listed building in Silver Street. However the charity has since moved its headquarters to BS14 Youth Centre.

In March 2018, Young Bristol was shortlisted as a finalist in the local apprenticeship of the Year awards. In April 2018, Young Bristol announced that Jonathan Webb was taking over as the president of the organisation. In 2020, Young Bristol was awarded, The Queen's Award for Voluntary Service, the highest award a voluntary group can receive in the UK.
