= John Orwin =

England international rugby union player

- Born: 20 March 1954 (age 72) Wibsey, Yorkshire
- Occupation: Engineer

Rugby union career
- Position: Lock
Amateur team(s)
Years	Team	Apps	(Points)
- RAF
–	Chichester		
–	Gloucester Rugby		
–	Norwich		
–	Bedford Blues		
–	Morley		
–	Wibsey		
–	Datchworth		
–	Biggleswade		
International career
Years	Team	Apps	(Points)
1985–1988	England	14	

John Orwin (born 20 March 1954) is a former Rugby union lock. Orwin toured New Zealand with England playing in both tests in 1985. He then captained England on their tour to Australia & Fiji in 1988.

He played for and captained Gloucester, Bedford, the Barbarians the Royal Air Force, and Combined Services.

Sporting positions
Preceded by Nigel Melville	England national rugby union team captain Apr-Jun 1988	Succeeded by Richard Harding
