= Bleddyn Jones =

Welsh rugby commentator (1948–2021)

- Born: 7 August 1948 Brynamman, Wales
- Died: 27 April 2021 (aged 72) Leicester, England
- Occupation: Teacher

Rugby union career
- Position: Fly Half
Senior career
Years	Team	Apps	(Points)
1969–1978	Leicester Tigers	333	(182)

Bleddyn Jones (7 August 1948 ― 27 April 2021) was a Welsh rugby commentator who worked principally for BBC Radio Leicester, commentating on Leicester Tigers matches since 1987. As a player, he made 333 appearances for Tigers, mostly at fly-half between 1969 and 1978, scoring 42 tries. He was not capped internationally. In his professional life he worked as a teacher. For the opening of the Caterpillar Stand at Welford Road in 2007, Jones was voted by readers of the Leicester Mercury into the "Walk of Legends" Team, ahead of Les Cusworth, Andy Goode and Joel Stransky. Bleddyn died on 27 April 2021, aged 72.
