= 1991 England rugby union tour of Australia and Fiji =

Summary
P	W	D	L
Total
6	3	0	3
Test match
2	1	0	1
Opponent
P	W	D	L
Fiji
1	1	0	0
Australia
1	0	0	1

Tour chronology
- ← Argentina 1990 South Africa 1994 →

The 1991 England rugby union tour of Australia and Fiji was a series of six matches played by the England national rugby union team in Australia and Fiji in July 1991. The England team won five of their nine matches. England lost their international against the Australia national rugby union team but won the match against the Fiji national rugby union team.

== Matches ==
Scores and results list England's points tally first.

Opposing Team	For	Against	Date	Venue	Status	Reference
New South Wales	19	21	7 July 1991	Waratah Stadium, Sydney	Tour match	
Victoria President's XV	26	9	10 July 1991	Olympic Park, Melbourne	Tour match	
Queensland	14	20	14 July 1991	Ballymore, Brisbane	Tour match	
Fiji	28	12	20 July 1991	National Stadium, Suva	Test match	
Emerging Wallabies	36	3	23 July 1991	Grahame Park, Gosford	Tour match	
Australia	15	40	27 July 1991	Sydney Football Stadium, Sydney	Test match	
