= John Buckton =

English rugby union player

- Full name: John Richard Buckton
- Born: 22 December 1961 (age 64)

Rugby union career
Senior career
Years	Team	Apps	(Points)
1984-96	Saracens		
International career
Years	Team	Apps	(Points)
1987-1991	England B		
1988	England		

John Richard Buckton (born 22 December 1961) is a former English rugby player who played as a centre for Saracens between 1984 and 1996, captaining them in the 1991–1992 season, as well as England B. He won his first England cap coming on in the final minutes of England v. Australia in 1988 at Twickenham.
