= Roger Uttley =

British Lions & England international rugby union player

- Born: Roger Miles Uttley; 11 September 1949 (age 77) Blackpool, England

Rugby union career
- Position: Lock
International career
Years	Team	Apps	(Points)
1973–1980	England	23	(4)
1974	British and Irish Lions	4	(8)
National sevens team
Years	Team		Comps
- England

Roger Miles Uttley (born 11 September 1949) OBE is a former English rugby union player.

== Career ==
Uttley played 23 games for England both in the second row and the back row, five times as captain, and four tests in the Lions back row on the undefeated 1974 tour to South Africa.

Roger was born in Blackpool, attended Montgomery High School, and Blackpool Grammar School and played first for Fylde then Gosforth before finishing his career at Wasps.

He was a member of the famous North team which beat the All Blacks at Otley on 17 November 1979 and went on to play in the England team which won the Grand Slam in 1980, retiring from international rugby later that year.

He coached the successful London and South East Divisional side in the mid to late 1980s before working with Geoff Cooke to coach and guide the England XV captained by Will Carling to the final of the 1991 World Cup

He was also assistant coach to the victorious 1989 British and Irish Lions tour to Australia.

In 1997 he was asked to manage the England XV, a job he enjoyed doing despite it coinciding with the infamous tour to hell. Due to cutbacks within the RFU the post of manager became financially unviable and he lost his position along with 30 other RFU employees.

His day job has always been in teaching physical education and for 20 years he was Director of that subject at Harrow School. In 2008 he retired to look after his wife and was succeeded by Jesse Coulson. He also taught at Cramlington High School for some years in the 1970s.

He is a former president of Sparks and a current council member of the same charity. He is an honorary member of Wooden Spoon the charity for disadvantaged children and young people.

In August 2014, Uttley was one of 200 public figures who were signatories to a letter to The Guardian expressing their hope that Scotland would vote to remain part of the United Kingdom in September's referendum on that issue.
