= Jonathan Webb =

England international rugby union player

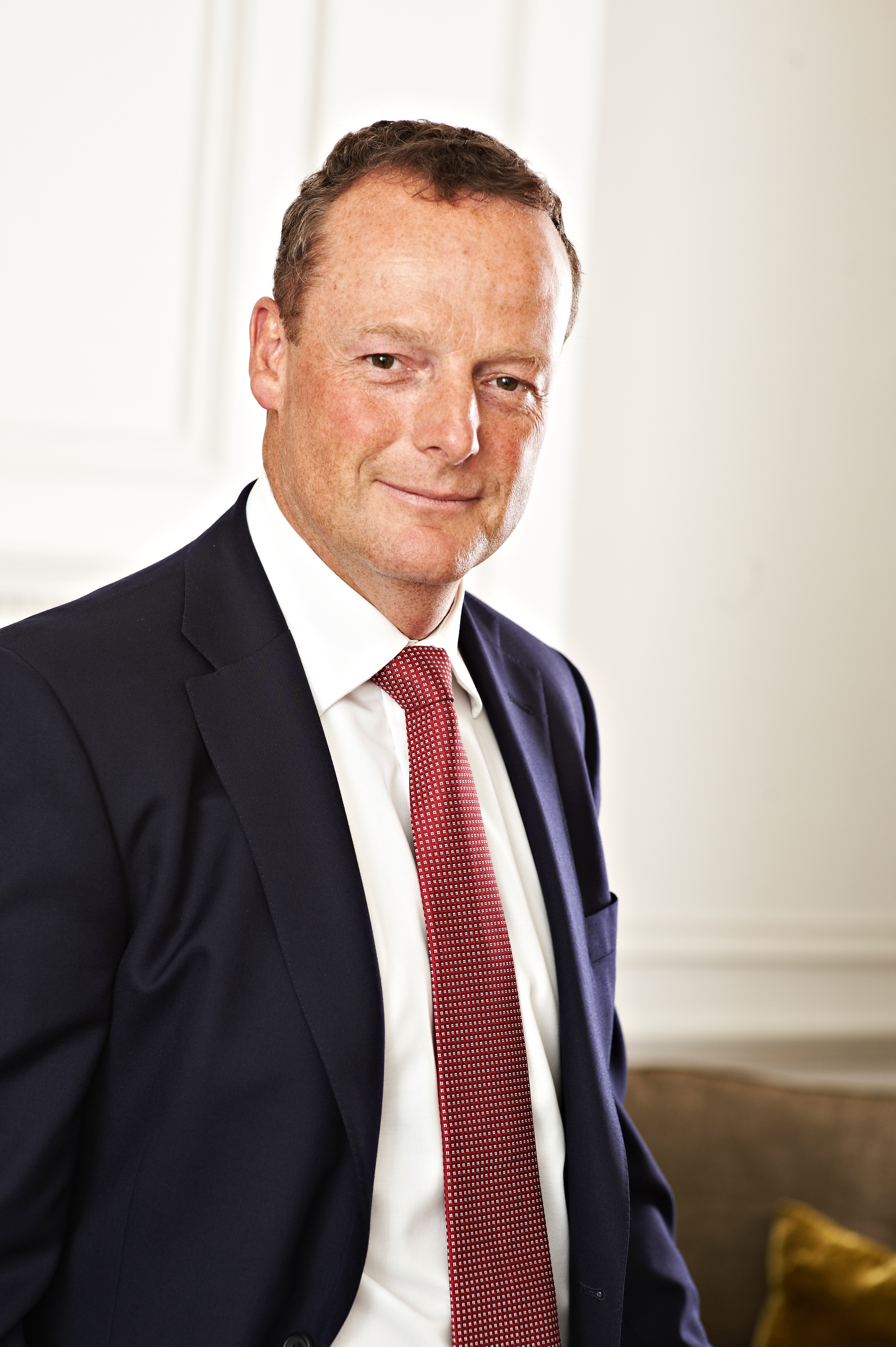
- Jonathan Webb in August 2011
- Born: Jonathan Mark Webb; 24 August 1963 (age 63) London, England
- University: University of Bristol
- Occupation: Orthopaedic surgeon

Rugby union career
- Position: Fullback
Amateur team(s)
Years	Team	Apps	(Points)
1985-1990	Bristol Rugby		
1990-1993	Bath Rugby		
International career
Years	Team	Apps	(Points)
1987-1993	England	33	(296)

Official website
- http://www.mrjonathanwebb.co.uk

Jonathan Mark Webb (born 24 August 1963 in London, England) is a specialist knee surgeon and former English rugby union fullback. Webb played for the England national team from 1987 to 1993, reaching the 1991 World Cup Final and winning two Five Nations grand slam titles. Since retiring from sport in 1993, he has focused on his career in orthopaedic surgery and has treated a number of professional rugby players and athletes. His father was the noted paediatrician John Webb.

== Rugby union career ==
=== Club level ===
Webb played top-flight rugby union during the game’s final years as an amateur sport. He attended the University of Bristol Medical School from 1982-1987, where he studied medicine and played for the university rugby union team.

In 1985 Webb joined Bristol Rugby, while continuing his medical degree. The team reached the final of the 1987-88 John Player Cup, but were beaten by Harlequins.

He joined Bath in 1990, staying until his retirement in 1993. Bath were dominant in European rugby during this time. Webb was part of the team that won the English Premiership in 1990-91, 1991-92, and 1992-92, and the Anglo-Welsh Cup in 1990 and 1992.

=== International level ===
Webb made his England debut at the 1987 Rugby World Cup, against host nation Australia on 23 May. He was a fixture in the team for the next two years, but was dropped in favour of Simon Hodgkinson in the second half of 1989, on the grounds of Hodgkinson's more consistent kicking both from hand and from place-kicks, and did not play for the next couple of years, thus missing out on the Five Nations Grand Slam of 1991 (and on the near-miss in 1990). Recalled for the summer tour and the World Cup later that autumn - on the grounds that he was more adventurous going forward and gave England greater options in the back line, after criticism of their forward-heavy tactics in the 1991 Grand Slam - he was in the England team that reached the 1991 World Cup Final, kicking his country’s only points as they lost to Australia 12-6. Webb also was part of the team that won England's second successive Five Nations championship Grand Slam in 1992: including perhaps his finest performance, scoring two tries (the first after less than a minute) in the 38-9 victory over Ireland in addition to kicking four conversions and two penalties. In addition to the consistency of his much-improved kicking throughout the tournament, he added another try against France in the next match as well.

He continued to represent England until 1993, winning 33 caps and scoring a total of 296 points. He played his final international against Ireland on 20 March 1993.

Webb retired from sport in 1993 to focus on his career as a surgeon. “I didn’t think I would be able to carry on doing both,” he has said. “By that stage in 1993 I had two kids, was a registrar, living in Bristol, working in Swindon and the time required for rugby was growing.”

In June 2016 Webb was appointed as a World Rugby Council RFU representative.

== Surgical career ==
Since retiring in 1993, Webb has developed a career in knee surgery and sports medicine, specialising in keyhole surgery and knee ligament reconstruction. In 1996 he undertook a year-long fellowship at the North Sydney Orthopaedic and Sports Medicine Centre in Australia. In 1999 he was named an Honorary Senior Lecturer at the University of Bristol. In 2011 Webb co-founded Fortius Clinic in London along with fellow surgeons Andy Williams and James D. F. Calder, where he practices as a consultant orthopaedic knee surgeon. In 2014 he became a patron of the Southern Spinal Injuries Trust.

In 2018 he took on a new role as president of Young Bristol.

== Other activities ==
Since 2006, Webb has been a member of The Society of Merchant Venturers.

== See also ==
- List of top English points scorers and try scorers
