= Chris Oti =

English rugby union player

- Born: Christopher C. Oti; 16 June 1965 (age 61) Paddington, London
- Height: 180 cm (5 ft 11 in)
- Weight: 83 kg (183 lb)

Rugby union career
- Position: Wing Three Quarter
Amateur team(s)
Years	Team	Apps	(Points)
1982–1983	Millfield		
1983–1986	Durham University		
1987–1988	Cambridge University		
Senior career
Years	Team	Apps	(Points)
1987–1988	Nottingham		(96)
1988–1993	Wasps		
International career
Years	Team	Apps	(Points)
1988–1991	England	13	(32)

Chris Oti (born 16 June 1965 in London) is an English former rugby union player. He was a rugby winger of prodigious pace who represented England thirteen times between 1988 and 1991. He was a member of the England squad that appeared in the 1991 Rugby World Cup during which he made two appearances. Chris Oti is married with 3 children.

== International career ==
Chris Oti had a brief career as a top flight rugby union player but nevertheless made a significant contribution to the history of the sport. He was the first black player since James Peters eighty years before to represent England when he made his international debut against Scotland at Murrayfield in March 1988.

Oti was capped five times the following season including against Romania when he scored four tries. He was selected for the British and Irish Lions tour of Australia but persistent injuries meant that he was not considered for the test side, and he also missed out on the Five Nations championships of 1990 and 1991.

However, later in 1991 he was surprisingly picked ahead of Nigel Heslop – the incumbent winger for the 1991 Five Nations and Grand Slam – for the opening World Cup match against New Zealand, and kept his place for the following game against Italy. This turned out to be his last international appearance as further injuries curtailed his career: England were forced to finish the World Cup with the same makeshift back line that they had previously finished the 1990 Five Nations championship, with Halliday (nominally a centre) on the wing, thanks to both Oti and Heslop – who took over from Oti in the group stages and quarter-final – being judged unfit to start the match.

At club level Oti represented Cambridge University, Nottingham and Wasps.

== International playing statistics ==
- 1988 v Scotland (Murrayfield) W 9–6 (5 Nations)
- 1988 v Ireland (Twickenham) W 35–3 (5 Nations)
- 1989 v Scotland (Twickenham) D 12–12 (5 Nations)
- 1989 v Ireland (Dublin) W 16–3 (5 Nations)
- 1989 v France (Twickenham) W 11–0 (5 Nations)
- 1989 v Wales (Cardiff) L 12–9 (Five Nations)
- 1989 v Romania (Bucharest) W 58–3
- 1990 v Argentina (Buenos Aires) W 25–12
- 1990 v Argentina (Buenos Aires) L 15–13
- 1991 v Fiji (Suva) W 28–12
- 1991 v Australia (Sydney) L 40–15
- 1991 v New Zealand (Twickenham) L 18–12 (W.Cup)
- 1991 v Italy (Twickenham) W 36–6 (W.Cup)
- Career Record: P13, W8, D1, L4
- Test Points: 32
- Tries: 8

(R) = Replacement
