= Jeff Probyn =

England international rugby union player

- Born: Jeffrey Alan Probyn; 27 April 1956 (age 70) Bethnal Green, London, England
- Height: 5 ft 10 in (1.78 m)

Rugby union career
- Position: Prop
International career
Years	Team	Apps	(Points)
1988–1993	England	37	(12)

Jeff Probyn (born 27 April 1956 in Bethnal Green, London) is an English former Rugby Union player.

The Old Albanian, Streatham and Wasps prop was selected in England's squad for the 1987 Rugby World Cup, but Probyn did not make his international debut until 1988, at the age of 31, against France. Probyn played in the 1991 Rugby World Cup where along with Brian Moore and Jason Leonard he was part of a destructive English front row as they reached the final, losing a tight match 12–6 to Australia at Twickenham. Along with Stuart Barnes, Wade Dooley, Mike Teague, Peter Winterbottom and Jon Webb, Probyn wore the England shirt for the last time in a 17–3 defeat by Ireland at Lansdowne Road in 1993. In total, he won 37 caps for England and scored 3 tries. In addition, Probyn toured South Africa with a World XV in 1989, played for the Lions against France in 1989 and was a member of the Wasps FC side that won the English Courage league in 1990.

Probyn was fairly slight for a modern international prop, and a good part of his effectiveness can be explained by his unusual physique: his bony shoulders sloped at a sharp angle, he was short in stature and his hips were widely set. In addition, he was able to scrum exceptionally low, making it hard for taller opponents to get any purchase on him at scrum time.

Due to Probyn's scrummaging techniques some players took to cutting off the sleeves of their shirts as they believed this was how Jeff managed to get so low down in the scrum and would use the sleeves as leverage. After Probyn continued to keep the scrum incredibly low, it was evident that their sleeve cutting was unnecessary.

After retirement from playing, Probyn was a member of Club England, the Rugby Football Union Committee. He was the manager of the England U21 team from 1994 to 1997 during which time he introduced Clive Woodward and Andy Robinson as coaches to representative rugby. After managing the U21 teams tour of Australia, where they played as a warm up for the first ever Cooke cup game between England and Australia, he returned to the RFU council and sat on the Club England group that elected Woodward as England coach. He sat on the 2006 review that saw the replacement of England's World Cup winning coaches with the team, led by Martin Johnson.

After leaving the RFU, Probyn was critical of cross-code transfers, such as that of Andy Farrell.

He also formed The Front Row Union Club F.R.U.C with fellow international front-row forwards Brian Moore and Paul Rendall.

Probyn is an Honorary President of Wooden Spoon, the charity of British and Irish rugby.

Probyn is also a regular on Talksport as their expert on Full Contact. Probyn is also a regular columnist in The Rugby Paper.

== Statistics ==
- Physical: 1.78 metres
- 37 caps (+ 1 nonofficial) for England
- Selections per year: 8 in 1988, 3 in 1989, 7 in 1990, 11 in 1991, 4 in 1992, 4 in 1993
- Five Nations tournaments: 1988, 1989, 1990, 1991 1992 1993
- World Cups: 1991, 5 matches
