= Brian Moore (rugby union) =

English rugby footballer and commentator

- Born: Brian Christopher Moore; 11 January 1962 (age 64) Birmingham, England
- Height: 1.75 m (5 ft 9 in)
- School: Crossley and Porter School
- University: University of Nottingham
- Occupation(s): Solicitor, pundit

Rugby union career
- Position: Hooker
Senior career
Years	Team	Apps	(Points)
1981–1990	Nottingham	196	(56)
1990–1995	Harlequins		
1995–1997	Richmond		
International career
Years	Team	Apps	(Points)
1987–1995	England	64	(4)
1989, 1993	Lions	5	(0)

Brian Christopher Moore (born 11 January 1962) is an English former rugby union footballer. He played as a hooker, and is a rugby presenter and pundit for BBC Sport, Talksport and Love Sport Radio. He qualified as a Rugby Football Union referee in 2010.

== Early life ==
Moore was born to single mother Rina Kirk in Birmingham. Abandoned by his father, his mother gave him up for adoption at 7 months old to Methodist lay preachers Ralph (deceased) and Dorothy Moore, of Halifax, West Yorkshire, where he lived in Illingworth and attended the Crossley and Porter School. He first played rugby union for the Old Crossleyans.

The shame he felt at being a victim of abuse made him keep silent about it until he visited the Child Exploitation and Online Protection Centre in London in 2008. He said the trauma made him ferociously competitive on the rugby field, and commented "If you have been abused, you feel tainted by association with the awfulness of the crime."

== Education ==
Moore studied law at the University of Nottingham gaining an LLB (Hons) degree in 1984, and was awarded an honorary Doctorate in Law on 14 July 2010. In 2023 he gained a Master's degree in Psychology from the University of Westminster as well as diplomas in counselling and psychotherapy from Guildford College in 2016, 2017 and 2018.

== Rugby career ==
Moore played as an amateur senior for Nottingham, the club where he made his name. During his time at Nottingham he won his first England caps and toured Australia with the British and Irish Lions. In 1990 he moved to London to train as a solicitor, and played for Harlequins. Moore ended his club career at Richmond.

Moore represented England, winning a total of 64 England caps between 1987 and 1995, making him the 13th most-capped Englishman (as of July 2007). Known for reading Shakespeare – in particular, parts of Henry V before a game in the dressing room to his teammates, Moore played in three Rugby World Cups including in 1991 where along with Jason Leonard and Jeff Probyn he was part of a destructive English front row as they reached the final, losing a tight match 12–6 to Australia at Twickenham. Moore was also a member of the England side which won Grand Slams in 1991, 1992 and 1995. In 1991, he was voted Rugby World Player of the Year, a decade before the sport's governing body (the IRB), began its awards programme.

He went on two British and Irish Lions tours, winning five test caps. In Australia in 1989, the Lions won the series 2–1, and Moore was famously caught celebrating the morning after on Sydney Harbour Bridge, doing aeroplane impressions.

Having been a vocal critic of referees for many years, Moore took the Rugby Football Union's Entry Level Referee Award course and qualified as a referee in 2010.

== Professional career ==
Moore trained as a solicitor, and he was a partner in both Edward Lewis LLP, and later Memery Crystal LLP. Although still qualified to practise, he has not done so since 2003.

== Media career ==
After retirement, Moore continued his legal career, and was asked regularly by the BBC to supplement their rugby commentary team. It is his full-time career, and he regularly commentated alongside Eddie Butler on the BBC's rugby union coverage, including the English matches in the Six Nations Championship. Moore is known for his blunt and straight-talking style. in 2008, he was heard to yell "They've kicked it away again, for God's sake!", when England did not run the ball in Rome, and shouted "You halfwit!" when an England forward played a French restart which had fallen short of the required ten metres, causing England to lose possession when they would otherwise have been awarded a scrum. His 6 Nations broadcasting was, as part of the overall BBC coverage, shortlisted in the Sport category of the 2011 BAFTA Television Awards..

Moore covered the 2011 Rugby World Cup for TalkSport Radio as lead co-commentator. He commentated on this tournament alongside Michael Owen, Scott Quinnell, Gavin Hastings, Paul Wallace, Phil Vickery, John Taylor, Andrew McKenna and David Campese. The coverage was shortlisted in the Broadcast of the Year category in the 2011 Sports Journalists Awards. He returned to Talksport in 2013 for their exclusively live coverage of the British and Irish Lions Tour of Australia, he presented every tour match live with Mark Saggers and commentated on the 3 test matches live. He commentated with Andrew McKenna, David Campese, Shane Williams, Michael Lynagh, Sean Holley and Sir Ian McGeechan. He joined talksport permanently in 2013–14 and now hosts their rugby show, Full Contact, every Sunday from 8 pm to 10 pm. He also co-hosted the Sports Breakfast alongside Alan Brazil on Tuesday mornings from 6 am to 10 am before leaving the station in 2016.

Moore writes on rugby, with a Monday column for The Daily Telegraph, and was shortlisted for Sports Journalist of the Year in the 2009 British Press Awards. After meeting Richard Stott at a corporate dinner, he wrote a wine column in the Today newspaper, transferred to the Sun for four years. He was a judge at the IWSC awards in 2018 held at the Oval, London.

Moore has made other media appearances, including in November 2008 on Question Time.

Moore has had books published by Simon & Schuster. His updated version of his autobiography, Beware of the Dog (2009), won the 2010 William Hill Sports Book of the Year award, among what was described as one of the strongest shortlists ever assembled. In 2011 it won the Best Autobiography award at the British Sports Book Awards. He has also published The Thoughts of Chairman Moore, and More Thoughts of Chairman Moore (2011).

He has been a regular invitee at leading UK literary festivals – including Hay, Keswick, Dartington Hall, Salisbury and Wimbledon.

Moore drew criticism for a comment he made during the 2020 Six Nations match between Ireland and France where he referenced bulimia when a player vomited at the side of the pitch during the match. Following criticism Moore apologised the next day, stating that he had meant the comment humorously but realised it was misjudged. The BBC later stated they had spoken to Moore about the comments and that the matter was now resolved.

=== Desert Island Discs ===
Moore was the guest on BBC Radio 4's Desert Island Discs on 24 February 2012 where he was interviewed at length by Kirsty Young. His music choices were Wolfgang Amadeus Mozart — Queen of the Night aria; Ian Dury and The Blockheads — "Hit Me with Your Rhythm Stick"; Genesis — "In the Cage"; Samuel Barber — Adagio for Strings; Pink Floyd — "Us and Them"; The Stranglers — "Always the Sun"; Green Day — "Jesus of Suburbia"; Pietro Mascagni — The Intermezzo from Cavalleria Rusticana. His choice of book was Germinal by Émile Zola and his luxury choice was a spherical football.

== Personal life ==
Moore's first marriage was to Penny and second marriage was to Lucy Thompson in 2000 in Kensington and Chelsea, London, by whom he had a daughter, Imogen. Both those marriages ended in divorce. His third wife is Belinda, who he married in 2008. They have three daughters including twins.

He is a supporter of, and season ticket holder at, Chelsea football club. In 2001 it was reported that he was a lifetime Labour Party voter. He left the Party after the decision to go to war in Iraq in 2003 and is now non-affiliated.

Moore attended the funeral of his birth mother in January 2020. He revealed afterwards on Twitter that he had discovered in so doing he was half Chinese, not half Malaysian as previously believed, and his grandfather had been a steelworker in Rotherham.

He, along with Prince Harry, both argued that in response to Black Lives Matter, the song "Swing Low, Sweet Chariot", should no longer be sung in a rugby context.
