= Wade Dooley =

British Lions & England international rugby union footballer

- Born: Wade Anthony Dooley; 2 October 1957 (age 69) Warrington, Cheshire, England
- Height: 6 ft 8 in (2.03 m)

Rugby union career
- Position: Lock
International career
Years	Team	Apps	(Points)
1985–1993	England	57	(12)
1989	Lions	2	(0)

Wade Dooley (born 2 October 1957) is an English former rugby union player who played lock forward. He played for England 55 times and was nicknamed the "Blackpool Tower", as a result of being 6 feet 8 inches tall and a police officer with Lancashire Constabulary in Blackpool.

Dooley was born in Warrington and played rugby league as a teenager, taking up rugby union aged 19. He played most of his career for Preston Grasshoppers, where he was nurtured by former England international and coach Dick Greenwood. He also had a brief spell with Fylde and with New Brighton F.C.

He made his international debut on 5 January 1985 against Romania. He later established a second row partnership with fellow police officer Paul Ackford.

In 1987, he broke the cheekbone of Welsh player Phil Davies with a punch during a rough game in Cardiff.

Dooley went on the 1989 British Lions tour to Australia, playing in the final two test matches. He was also part of the England team that won back-to-back grand slams in 1991 and 1992. He also went on the 1993 British Lions tour to New Zealand, but left the tour to return home for the funeral of his father. He was replaced on the tour by the Leicester lock Martin Johnson, and decided to retire.

Since retirement, Dooley and his wife, Sharon, have run a tea room, Dizzy Ducks, in Wrea Green.
