= Geoff Cooke (rugby union) =

English rugby union footballer and coach

Geoff Cooke OBE (born 11 June 1941) is a former rugby union player, an England Rugby coach and manager of the 1993 British Lions rugby union tour to New Zealand.

== Early career ==
During his playing career he played mainly as a Centre/Fly Half 1962-72 and captained his Club Bradford RFC and his County, Cumbria. Cooke also attended St. John's College, York now York St John University where he played both rugby union and cricket. He was coach to Bradford RFC 1973 to 1975, coach to Yorkshire Rugby Football Union 1975–9, then chairman of selectors from 1980 to 1985. He was a North of England selector from 1979 to 1987.

== Management ==
Cooke was appointed manager of the England Rugby Union Team in October 1987 and led the England Rugby team in 49 international matches between 1987 and 1994 including two tours to Australia/Fiji and one to Argentina.

Under his leadership, England won successive (1991 and 1992) Grand Slams in the 5 Nations Championship, were runners-up in the 1991 World Cup and winners of the 1993 World Cup Sevens.

In 1993 he was made manager of the British Lions rugby union tour to New Zealand.

== Recent years ==
In recent years he has been chief executive and director of rugby at Bedford Rugby Club guiding them to promotion to the Premiership in 1998 and chief executive at Wakefield Rugby Club and Worcester Rugby Club until his retirement from full-time employment in April 2002.

Back in the amateur ranks he rejoined his former club, Bradford & Bingley as director of rugby, guiding them to promotion to North One in his first season and then taking them straight through in 2003–04 to a second successive promotion to National League Three (North) and also winning the Intermediate Cup at Twickenham.

After retiring from active coaching he served as executive director of First Division Rugby Limited, the collective organisation of sixteen clubs that competed in National League 1 of the English Rugby Union Clubs Championship until superseded by the present Championship. Now fully retired he was president and chairman of the Directors of Bracken Ghyll Golf Club in Addingham, Yorkshire from 2011 to 2013.

== Personal life ==
He is married to Susan with two sons, Andrew (born 1972) and David (born 1976).

He was awarded the O.B.E for services to Rugby Football in June 1992.

He has two books (Rugby Union – 1981 EP Sport & Skilful Rugby Union – 1991 A & C Black) to his name and is the author of numerous articles on sports coaching.

== Sources ==
- Wakefield Rugby Football Club—1901-2001 A Centenary History. Written and compiled by David Ingall in 2001.

Preceded by Martin Green	English national rugby coach 1987–1994	Succeeded by Jack Rowell
