= 1990–91 Pilkington Cup =

English rugby union competition

- Countries: England
- Champions: Harlequins (2nd title)
- Runners-up: Northampton
- Matches played: 74

The 1990–91 Pilkington Cup was the 20th edition of England's, premier (at that time) rugby union club competition. Harlequins won the competition, for the second time, defeating Northampton 25 – 13 at Twickenham. The event was sponsored by Pilkington.

== First round ==
Home	Away	Score
Aspatria	Vale of Lune	3–9
Chesterfield	Northern	9–19
Fylde	Hereford	22–3
Kettering	Hartlepool Rovers	6–18
Lichfield	West Park Bramhope	21–7
Morley	Newark	9–3
Nuneaton	Preston Grasshoppers	16–21
Sheffield	Old Yardleians	22–0
Syston	Roundhay	22–6
Winnington Park	Broughton Park	15–19
West Hartlepool	Bedworth	38–3
Wigan	Harrogate	13–15
Clifton	Basingstoke	31–27
Exeter	Askeans	36–6
Gordon League	Camborne	10–21
High Wycombe	Ealing	28–13
Lewes	Banbury	21–13
London Welsh	Tabard	16–7
North Walsham	Metropolitan Police	13–7
Parkhouse	Lydney	9–10
Reading	Midsomer Norton	31–4
Salisbury	Brixham	26–6
Spartans	Gravesend	21–6
Sudbury	Sutton & Epsom	30–24
Torquay Albion	Old Whitgiftians	12–15

== Second round ==
Home team	Away team	Score
Broughton Park	Lichfield	24–19
Harrogate	Bedford	16–0
Hartlepool Rovers	Northern	20–9
Morley	Rugby	12–40
Gosforth	Fylde	22–9
Preston Grasshoppers	West Hartlepool	3–20
Sheffield	Headingley	13–9
Syston	Waterloo	6–12
Vale of Lune	Coventry	6–22
Wakefield	Sale	20–21
Blackheath	Salisbury	24–3
Clifton	Reading	20–15
Exeter	Camborne	20–10
Lewes	Spartans	6–10
London Welsh	Plymouth Albion	19–12
Lydney	High Wycombe	10–12
North Walsham	London Irish	11–26
Richmond	Sudbury	25–9

== Third round ==
Home team	Away team	Score
Bath	Leicester	0–12
Bristol	Waterloo	18–9
Coventry	Rosslyn Park	7–21
Gloucester	Broughton Park	52–0
Harlequins	Clifton	56–4
Harrogate	Northampton	4–18
High Wycombe	Moseley	10–18
London Irish	Sale	20–16
Newcastle Gosforth	Blackheath	19–10
Nottingham	London Scottish	10–9
Orrell	Spartans	69–13
Richmond	Liverpool St Helens	13–12
Saracens	Hartlepool Rovers	36–0
Rugby	London Welsh	29–3
Sheffield	Exeter	3–0
West Hartlepool	Wasps	3–7

== Fourth round ==
Home team	Away team	Score
Bristol	Moseley	6–9
Gloucester	Harlequins	13–15
Leicester	Wasps	13–15
London Irish	Rugby	22–11
Northampton	Saracens	15–10
Nottingham	Richmond	24–6
Orrell	Newcastle Gosforth	26–9
Rosslyn Park	Sheffield	36–0

== Quarter-finals ==
Home team	Away team	Score
Harlequins	Rosslyn Park	24–12
Northampton	Moseley	10–6
Nottingham	London Irish	48–9
Wasps	Orrell	9–15

== Semi-finals ==
Home team	Away team	Score
Harlequins	Nottingham	22–18 (aet)
Northampton	Orrell	18–10

== Final ==
4 May 1991

Harlequins	25–13 (Note: The score had ended 13–13 after 80 mins.) (a.e.t.)	Northampton
Try: Langhorn; Harriman; Halliday; Glenister; Con: Pears 3 Pen: Pears		Try: Moss; Pen: Steele 3

Twickenham Stadium, London
Attendance: 53,000
Referee: Ed Morrison (Bristol)

Harlequins
Northampton

15	Stuart Thresher
14	Andrew Harriman
13	Will Carling
12	Simon Halliday
11	Everton Davis
10	David Pears
9	Rob Glenister
8	Richard Langhorn
7	Peter Winterbottom (c)
6	Mick Skinner
5	Paul Ackford
4	Troy Coker
3	Andy Mullins
2	Brian Moore
1	Jason Leonard
Replacements:
16	Nick Kilick
17	Craig Luxton
18	Gavin Thompson
19	Paul Challinor
20	Mark Russell
21	Martin Hobley
Coach: Dick Best

15	Ian Hunter
14	Frank Packman
13	John Thame
12	Peter Moss
11	Harvey Thorneycroft
10	John Steele
9	Richard Nancekivell
8	Tim Rodber
7	Phil Pask
6	Paul Alston
5	John Etheridge
4	Colin Hall
3	Gary Pearce (c)
2	John Olver
1	Gavin Baldwin
Replacements:
16	David Elkington for Nancekivell
17	Ben Ward for Packman
18	Matthew Ebsworth
19	Peter Roworth
20	Vasey Pocklington
21	David Newman
Coach: Paul Bryant, St. Luke's College & Northampton Saints

== Sponsorship ==
The competition was sponsored by Pilkington who had provided £700,000 over the first three seasons and agreed to a further three years worth £1,000,000.
