= 1991–92 Pilkington Cup =

English rugby union competition

- Countries: England
- Champions: Bath (7th title)
- Runners-up: Harlequins

The 1991–92 Pilkington Cup was the 21st edition of England's premier rugby union club competition at the time. Bath won the competition defeating Harlequins in the final. The event was sponsored by Pilkington and the final was held at Twickenham Stadium.

== Draw and results ==
=== First round ===
Home	Away	Score
Askeans	Havant	19-10
Barkers Butts	Sudbury	6-3
Barnstaple	Richmond	6-26
Berry Hill	Matson	15-16
Camborne	Henley	17-13
Combe Down	Old Mid-Whitgiftians	25-9
High Wycombe	Redruth	16-12
Lydney	Old Colfeians	29-15
Metropolitan Police	Exeter	6-14
Reading	Sutton & Epsom	24-23
Ruislip	Lewes	35-7
Salisbury	Clifton	16-27
Sidcup	Thurrock	10-38
Torquay Athletic	Cheshunt	10-19
Fylde	Hereford	17-10
Halifax	Stourbridge	17-8
Harrogate	Nuneaton	61-4
Headingley	Paviors	16-3
Lichfield	Tynedale	12-13
Manchester	Broughton Park	7-3
Otley	Winnington Park	11-12
Roundhay	Loughborough Students	18-30
Stockton	Towcestrians	17-10
Widnes	Sheffield	16-19
Wigton	Moderns	9-3

=== Second round ===
Home	Away	Score
Camborne	Reading	23-13
Cheshunt	Ruislip	9-23
Clifton	Plymouth	21-0
Combe Down	Thurrock	6-16
Coventry	Stockton	20-6
Exeter	London Scottish	6-21
Fylde	Winnington Park	16-12
Harrogate	West Hartlepool	18-21
High Wycombe	Askeans	22-16
Loughborough Students	Headingley	17-15
Manchester	Barkers Butts	22-9
Matson	Lydney	12-15
Newcastle Gosforth	Morley	10-9
Richmond	Blackheath	22-12
Sale	Moseley	18-12
Sheffield	Bedford	13-30
Tynedale	Wakefield	21-20
Waterloo	Liverpool St Helens	21-10
Wigton	Halifax	30-3

=== Third round ===
Home	Away	Score
Bath	Nottingham	52-0
Bedford	Harlequins	3-33
Bristol	Clifton	30-4
Coventry	Northampton	7-31
Fylde	Leicester	6-34
London Scottish	Tynedale	20-3
Loughborough Students	Rosslyn Park	16-26
Lydney	Sale	7-13
Manchester	Wigton	18-12
Newcastle Gosforth	Ruislip	52-0
Orrell	Camborne	50-0
Rugby	Gloucester	3-23
Saracens	Richmond	33-9
Thurrock	London Irish	16-10
Wasps	High Wycombe	32-3
West Hartlepool	Waterloo	16-18

=== Fourth round ===
Home	Away	Score
Bristol	Saracens	13-6
Gloucester	London Scottish	20-7
Manchester	Newcastle Gosforth	9-21
Northampton	Bath	9-13 aet
Rosslyn Park	Thurrock	44-15
Sale	Orrell	0-36
Wasps	Harlequins	9-20
Waterloo	Leicester	12-20

=== Quarter-finals ===
Home	Away	Score
Bristol	Bath	6–15
Newcastle Gosforth	Leicester	0–10
Orrell	Gloucester	16–25
Rosslyn Park	Harlequins	12–34

=== Semi-finals ===
Home	Away	Score
Gloucester	Bath	18–27 (aet)
Harlequins	Leicester	15–9

=== Final ===
2 May 1992

Bath	15–12 (a.e.t.)	Harlequins
Try: de Glanville; Con: Webb; Pen: Webb 2 Drop: Barnes		Try: Winterbottom; Con: Pears; Pen: Pears 2

Twickenham Stadium, London
Attendance: 62,000
Referee: Fred Howard (RFU)

Bath
Harlequins

16	Jonathan Webb
15	Tony Swift
14	Phil de Glanville
12	Jeremy Guscott
11	Jim Fallon
10	Stuart Barnes
9	Richard Hill
8	Ben Clarke
7	Steve Ojomoh
6	Andy Robinson (c)
5	Nigel Redman
4	Martin Haag
3	Victor Ubogu
2	Graham Dawe
1	Gareth Chilcott
Replacements:
16	Steve Knight
17	Dave Egerton
18	John Mallett
19	I Lewis
20	John Bamsey
21	C Atkins
Coach:
Jack Rowell

15	David Pears
14	Mike Wedderburn
13	Simon Halliday
12	Will Carling
11	Everton Davis
10	Paul Challinor
9	Craig Luxton
8	Chris Sheasby
7	Peter Winterbottom (c)
6	Mark Russell
5	Paul Ackford
4	Robert Edwards
3	Andy Mullins
2	Brian Moore
1	Martin Hobley
Replacements:
16	Nick Kilick
17	Rob Glenister
18	Gavin Thompson
19	Andrew Harriman
20	Peter Thresher
21	Michael Pratley
Coach:
