= 1987–88 John Player Cup =

Rugby cup

1987–88 John Player Special Cup
- Countries: England
- Champions: Harlequins
- Runners-up: Bristol
- Highest attendance: 37,000 Harlequins v Bristol at Twickenham

The 1987–88 John Player Special Cup was the 17th edition of England's premier rugby union cup competition. Harlequins won the competition, for the first time, defeating Bristol in the final at Twickenham Stadium. The competition was sponsored by John Player cigarettes.

== First round ==
Home	Away	Score
Askeans	London Irish	10-12
Bedford	Barkers Butts	35-4
Berry Hill	Salisbury	12-0
Devonport Services	Maidenhead	11-12
Dixonians	Droitwich	21-6
Ealing	Southend	10-9
Gordon League	Chiltern	44-7
Fylde	Hartlepool Rovers	30-9
Leighton Buzzard	Derby	10-7
Letchworth	Blackheath	0-26
Lewes	Havant	15-13
Lichfield	Vipers	31-3
London Scottish	Sudbury	9-3
Nuneaton	Aspatria	4-43
Old Alleynians	Maidstone	12-0
Oxford	Camborne	14-0
Redruth	Old Culverhaysians	26-9
Tynedale	Vale of Lune	16-15
Wakefield	Morley	22-0
Widnes	Birkenhead Park	4-3

== Second round ==
Home	Away	Score
Berry Hill	Lewe	35-9
Dixonians	Asptatria	3-53
Gordon League	Oxford	18-16
Leighton Buzzard	Bedford	6-24
Lichfield	Widnes	31-3
London Irish	Ealing	13-10
Maidenhead	Old Alleynians	13-3
Redruth	Blackheath	9-13
Tynedale	London Scottish	11-9
Wakefield	Fylde	24-21

== Third round ==
Home	Away	Score
Aspatria	Wasps	6-13
Bedford	Bristol	4-21
Coventry	Tynedale	7-6
Gloucester	Orrell	19-9
Gordon League	Headingley	10-0
Harlequins	Maidenhead	40-0
Lichfield	Bath	3-43
London Irish	Sale	3-16
London Welsh	Berry Hill	10-13
Plymouth Albion	Northampton	14-7
Richmond	Liverpool St Helens	10-6
Rosslyn Park	Leicester	0-15
Ruislip	Gosforth	10-13
Saracens	Blackheath	15-3
Waterloo	Nottingham	19-6
Wakefield	Moseley	4-14

== Fourth round ==
Home	Away	Score
Berry Hill	Harlequins	4-17
Bristol	Richmond	34-0
Coventry	Sale	0-13
Gloucester	Wasps	13-24
Gordon League	Waterloo	9-11
Leicester	Bath	6-13
Moseley	Gosforth	33-9
Plymouth Albion	Saracens	14-6

== Quarter-finals ==
Home	Away	Score
Plymouth Albion	Wasps	4-26
Harlequins	Waterloo	37-4
Moseley	Bath	4-3
Sale	Bristol	15-19

== Semi-finals ==
Moseley	6–34	Bristol

The Reddings

Wasps	16–20 (a.e.t.)	Harlequins

Sudbury

== Final ==
30 April 1988

Harlequins	28–22	Bristol
Try: Carling 2 Harriman; Con: Thresher; Salmon; Pen: Thresher; Salmon 3		Try: Duggan; Penalty try Con: Webb; Pen: Webb 3 Drop: Knibbs

Twickenham Stadium, London
Attendance: 37,000 (record for competition)
Referee: Fred Howard (Liverpool)

Harlequins
Bristol

15	Stuart Thresher
14	Andrew Harriman
13	Jamie Salmon
12	Will Carling
11	Everton Davis
10	Adrian Thompson
9	Richard Moon
8	Richard Langhorn
7	Tim Bell
6	Mick Skinner
5	Neil Edwards
4	Paul Ackford
3	Andy Mullins
2	John Olver (c)
1	Paul Curtis
Replacements:
16	Simon Hunter
17	Richard Cramb
18	Alan Woodhouse
19	David Butcher
20	S Conway
21	Chris Sheasby
Coach:

A	Jonathan Webb
B	Huw Duggan
C	David Thomas
D	Ralph Knibbs
E	John Carr
F	Simon Hogg
G	Richard Harding
O	Paul Collings
N	Wayne Hone
M	Andy Dun
L	Nigel Pomphrey (c)
K	Andy Blackmore
J	John Doubleday
I	Dave Palmer
H	Crayton Phillips
Replacements:
P	Kevin Morgan
Q	Paul Jeffrey
R	Kevin Bogira
S	Darryll Hickey
T	Geoff Crane
U	Pete Polledri
Coach:
Bob Hesford

(Note: This game would also count as Harlequins and Bristol's league match in the 1987–88 Courage League Division One.)

== Records ==
- The attendance for the final of 37,000 was highest in the competition's history
- Bath's unbeaten sequence of 22 matches ended when Moseley beat them in a quarter-final at The Reddings

== Sponsorship ==
The competition was sponsored, for the last time, by John Player and the prize money was £125,000 (an increase of £15,000). Both finalists received £3,750 each and in thirteen years of sponsorship over £1 million has been provided.
