= Jason Leonard =

British Lions & England international rugby union player

Jason Leonard OBE
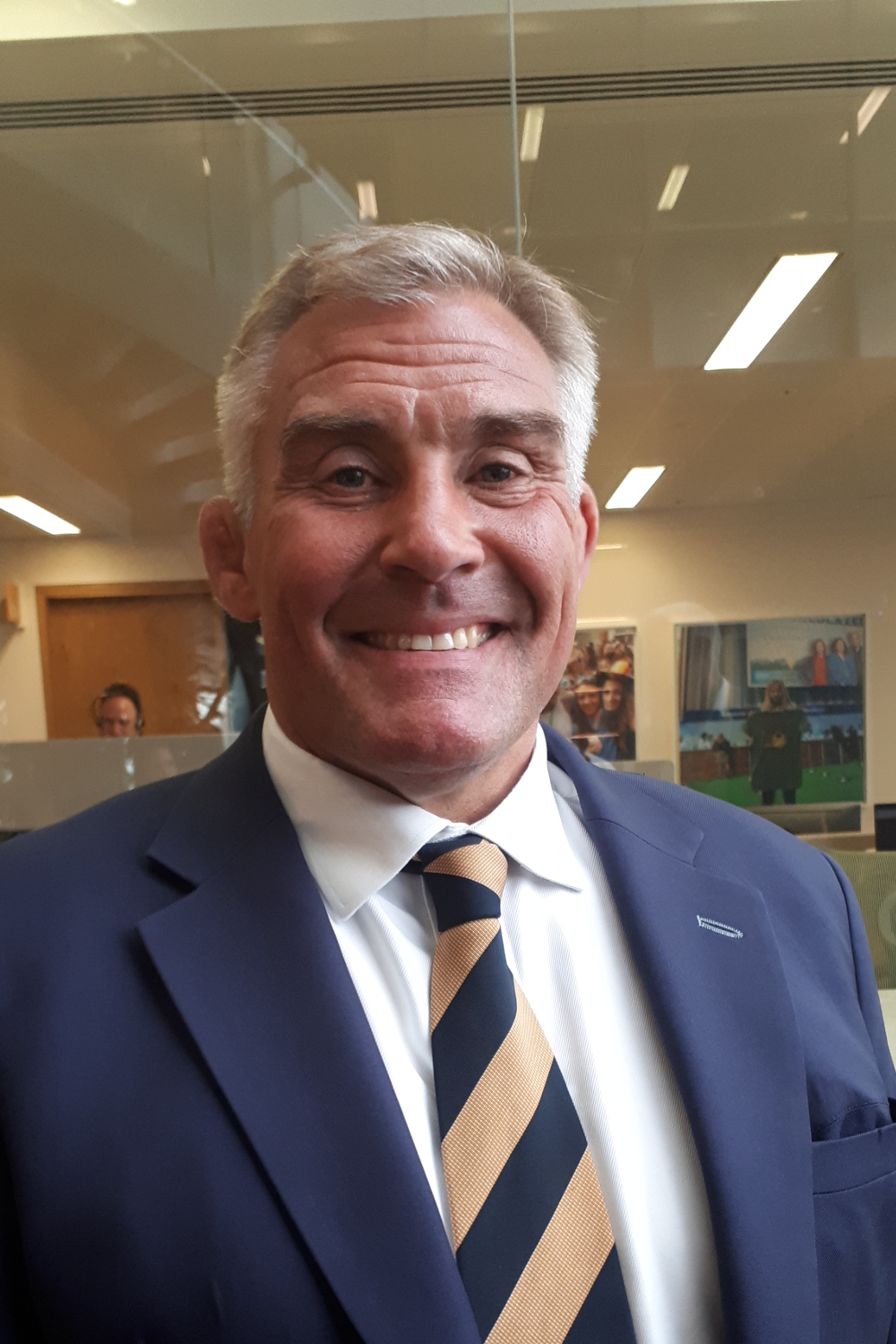
- Leonard in 2018
- Born: 14 August 1968 (age 58) Barking, London, England
- Height: 177 cm (5 ft 10 in)
- Weight: 111 kg (245 lb; 17 st 7 lb)
- Occupation(s): Rugby player, Management, Business owner

Rugby union career
- Position: Prop
Senior career
Years	Team	Apps	(Points)
1982–1989	Barking RFC		
1989–1990	Saracens		
1990–2004	Harlequins	290	
International career
Years	Team	Apps	(Points)
1990–2004	England	114	(5)
1993–2001	British & Irish Lions	5	(0)

Jason Leonard OBE (born 14 August 1968) is an English former rugby union player. He won a then-record 114 caps for England men’s rugby team during a 14-year international career.

A prop, Leonard played club rugby for Barking RFC, Saracens and Harlequins. He played in England teams which won four Grand Slams (1991, 1992, 1995 and 2003) and the 2003 Rugby World Cup, and played for the British & Irish Lions on three tours, winning five more caps. He was part of the Lions squad that won the test series during their 1997 tour of South Africa.

He was awarded the MBE for services to rugby in 2002, and an OBE after England's Rugby World Cup success. He was also inducted to the World Rugby Hall of Fame in 2014.

Since his retirement in 2004, Leonard has been active in the governance of rugby. He was President of the RFU (2015–2016), and Chairman of the British & Irish Lions (2019–2022), succeeded by Ieuan Evans.

In 2008, Leonard joined Besso Group, and has since worked as a senior advisor for the established Lloyd's broker. Leonard has launched his own special event service, the FunBus.

== Club rugby ==
Leonard's lengthy career straddled both the amateur and professional eras and he had a job as a carpenter. He began playing for his home club, Barking and his school teams as a youth, and as his playing talents became recognised, interest was shown by London club Saracens, where he moved in 1989. Following a year at Saracens, he moved to Harlequins, where he stayed until his professional retirement in May 2004, making a total of 290 appearances for the team.

== England career ==
=== 1990–1993 ===
Leonard won his first cap on 28 July 1990, against Argentina in Buenos Aires. At the age of 22 he was the youngest prop forward to ever play for England (until 24/10/24 when Asher Opoko-Forjour won his first cap for England as Tight-Head, coming on in the 54th minute at 20 years of age). The visitors were made to feel unwelcome, however, as the game was played on the 8th anniversary of the Falklands War. Leonard describes in his autobiography that the crowd were throwing oranges (among other things) at the England players. The most interesting object he saw on the pitch was a bathroom tap. England eventually won the game 25–12; it proved a baptism of fire for the young Leonard.

Leonard played his whole England career in a largely dominant pack and in his early career played with established forwards such as Brian Moore, Wade Dooley, Dean Richards, Mick Skinner, Mike Teague and Peter Winterbottom. The England pack of this era helped England Rugby win much success, often playing a limited 10-man game that suited the large and physical England forwards.

During this period, England won back-to-back Grand Slams in 1991 and 1992. Despite losing the opening pool match to New Zealand 18–12, England made it to the Rugby World Cup Final in 1991, losing 12–6 to pre-tournament favourites Australia. In that game, England played open rugby, like they had in the Five Nations in 1990, although it was the forward-dominated 10-man game which earlier in 1991 had won them the Five Nations Grand Slam, as well as the quarter-final against France and semi-final against Scotland.

Against Wales in 1992, Leonard suffered a neck injury: he experienced a numbing sensation in his right arm, but had no idea he had ruptured a vertebra in his neck, so played out the remainder of the match. Later, he required emergency surgery, where bone from his hip had to be grafted into his neck. Leonard's career was in grave doubt, after only 10 tests. Due to brilliant surgery and his rehabilitation regime, however, he made a full recovery, winning his 11th cap against Canada at Twickenham that autumn without missing an England test.

In 1993, Leonard was selected for his first British and Irish Lions tour to New Zealand.

=== 1995–1997 ===
With Dick Best no longer England head coach, the RFU appointed well-known and highly successful Bath coach Jack Rowell as his replacement. There was much speculation amongst many established England players as to what changes the new coach would bring to the England setup, particularly one with such close ties to a successful Bath Rugby Club. Rowell claimed he would rid England of the cautious, forward-dominated 10-man game which had done so well for them earlier in the decade, and play running rugby more similar to Bath's. Leonard kept his place in the England team, which now included several new players such as Mike Catt, Ben Clarke, Victor Ubogu, Steve Ojomoh (all Bath players) and Tim Rodber. In the 1995 Five Nations, Leonard won a record (for a prop) 38th cap for England, playing against Scotland, and the victory meant his third Grand Slam.

England held high hopes for the 1995 Rugby World Cup in South Africa. At the World Cup, England were drawn in Pool B, generally regarded as one of the easier groups in the competition. However, England experienced setbacks, gaining only narrow victories over Argentina (24–18) and Italy (27–20). In England's final pool match against Western Samoa, Leonard was rested and his record of 40 consecutive England caps ended. England won that match 44–22 and also won the subsequent quarter-final against Australia 25–22, before losing the semi-final to New Zealand 29–45 and finishing the tournament in fourth place.

In November 1996, Leonard skippered England for the first time, against Argentina at Twickenham. The game was very close, with Argentina taking a narrow lead close to full-time. From a rolling maul, Leonard scored a try to level the scores, and a Mike Catt penalty won the game 20–18. The try was Leonard's only score for England.

In the 1996–1997 season, Leonard began to play for England at tighthead prop (number 3) to make room for Leicester Tigers loosehead prop (number 1), Graham Rowntree, and in 1997, Leonard was selected for his second British and Irish Lions tour, this time to South Africa.

In September 1997, the RFU appointed Clive Woodward as head coach. The Autumn internationals saw England playing Australia, South Africa and New Zealand. Against Australia, Leonard found himself selected at loosehead prop again, with Wasps' Will Green winning his first cap at tighthead. For the remaining two tests, Leonard was moved back to tighthead. The ability to scrummage effectively on either side of the scrum proved to be one of Leonard's great assets.

=== 1998–2003 ===
Leonard continued to be an England regular under Woodward. In 1999, England competed in the Rugby World Cup, hosted this time by Wales. World Cup matches were also played throughout the rest of the British Isles and in France. England had shown signs of improvement under Woodward, who had been looking to play a more expansive game, but were denied a Grand Slam prior to the World Cup due to Neil Jenkins' boot and a last-minute try by Scott Gibbs. This, however, was to be the first of four consecutive near-misses.

In the 1999 World Cup, England were drawn in Pool 2 with New Zealand, Italy and Tonga, but were knocked out of the tournament at the quarter-final stage by South Africa.

The new Millennium saw Leonard break several records; he surpassed Rory Underwood as England's most capped player with his 86th cap against Argentina in November 2000. 12 months later against Romania he overtook former New Zealand captain Sean Fitzpatrick as the world's most-capped forward in his 93rd appearance.

For the 2000 Autumn internationals, Leonard was dropped to the bench and replaced by Graham Rowntree. In 2001, although England had scored 28 tries in their first four Six Nations matches, they lost the fifth to Ireland after the match had been rescheduled. 2001 also saw a tour of the British and Irish Lions, coached by Graham Henry, to Australia. The Wallabies won the Test series 2–1, though the Lions had convincingly won the first Test and were in the driving seat at half-time during the second Test in Melbourne. After this, England began to notch up regular victories against the big guns of the Southern Hemisphere (New Zealand, South Africa and Australia), culminating in the 2003 World Cup.

On 15 February 2003, Jason Leonard became the first-ever forward to make 100 international appearances, when he started against France in a Six Nations clash. He was also the first Englishman and overall third player (after Philippe Sella and David Campese) to achieve this feat.

In March, Leonard played a key role in securing England's Grand Slam with a win over Ireland at Lansdowne Road. In August he captained England for the second time in World Cup warm-up match, crushing Wales 43–9 at the Millennium Stadium in Cardiff. It was Leonard's proven ability to play both loose-head and tight-head and experience which earned him a spot in England's World Cup Squad. During the tournament, he made appearances in all seven matches of the 2003 World Cup, including the semi-final against France where he overtook Phillipe Sella as the world's most-capped player. During the 2003 tournament, Leonard appeared in his second World Cup final as a second-half substitute for tight-head prop Phil Vickery, playing a vital role in reducing England's high penalty count at the scrum. The then coach Clive Woodward later wrote in his autobiography that Leonard's introduction was the key substitution which helped England to win the match.

Leonard played one more match for England in the 2004 Six Nations Championship against Italy before announcing his retirement as the (then) most-capped player of all time with 114 caps for England and five for the British and Irish Lions. Overall, Leonard made 23 appearances for the British Lions over 3 tours including 5 test appearances without scoring any points.

== Charity ==
Leonard has worked with and supported numerous charities throughout his career. He has been holding Annual Dinners since 2004, which have to date raised over £2 million for charities and good causes.

In 2014, he founded The Atlas Foundation to help deprived children around the world work towards a better future through rugby communities and initiatives.

== Miscellaneous ==
Jason Leonard was the subject of This Is Your Life in 2000 when he was surprised by Michael Aspel.

Until 5 August 2011, when it was renamed "Southend City on Sea", a Class 357 EMU 357003 operated by c2c on the London, Tilbury & Southend line was named "Jason Leonard". The line serves his hometown of Barking, East London.

In 2012, Leonard was the second recipient of "The Prince Obolensky Award" presented by the Prince Obolensky Association to people associated with the game of Rugby Union who embody the "Corinthian Spirit".

== See also ==
- List of rugby union test caps leaders

== Honours ==
- Rugby World Cup
  - Winners: 2003
  - Runner-up: 1991
- Six Nations Championship/Five Nations Championship
  - Winners: 1991, 1992, 1995, 1996, 2000, 2001, 2003
  - Runner-up: 1994, 1997, 1998, 1999, 2002
