= Richard Best =

Richard Best may refer to:

- Richard Best (film editor) (1916–2004), British film editor
- Richard Best (judge) (1869–1939), Irish barrister, Unionist politician, and Lord of Appeal of the Supreme Court of Northern Ireland
- Richard Irvine Best (1872–1959), Irish Celticist
- Richard Halsey Best (1910–2001), United States Navy officer and World War II dive bomber pilot
- Richard Best, Baron Best (born 1945), English social housing leader
- Dick Best (born 1954), British rugby union coach and journalist
- Richard Best (diplomat) (1933–2014), British ambassador to Iceland
