= 1993 British Lions tour to New Zealand =

- Date: 22 May – 3 July
- Coach: (Scotland) Ian McGeechan
- Tour captain: (Scotland) Gavin Hastings
- Test series winners: New Zealand (2–1)
- Top test point scorer: (Scotland) Gavin Hastings (38)
Summary
P	W	D	L
Total
13	7	0	6
Test match
3	1	0	2
Opponent
P	W	D	L
New Zealand
3	1	0	2

Tour chronology
- ← Australia 1989 South Africa 1997 →

In 1993 the British Lions rugby union team toured New Zealand. This was the last Lions tour in the sport's amateur era. The Lions were managed by Geoff Cooke, coached by Ian McGeechan and Dick Best, and captained by Gavin Hastings.

The Lions played a three-test series against New Zealand, and ten matches against provincial teams and the New Zealand Maori. They won six and lost four of those games. The Lions lost the first test match, but won the second to level the series, with New Zealand winning the third test and the series.

Wade Dooley appeared briefly on the tour but left to return home to England to attend his father's funeral and he was replaced by Martin Johnson.

== Squad ==
=== Backs ===
Name	Club	National team	Notes
Rob Andrew	Wasps	England	
Stuart Barnes	Bath	England	
Will Carling	Harlequins	England	
Tony Clement	Swansea	Wales	
Vince Cunningham	St Mary's College	Ireland	Replacement for Scott Hastings
Ieuan Evans	Llanelli	Wales	
Scott Gibbs	Swansea	Wales	
Jeremy Guscott	Bath	England	
Gavin Hastings (c)	Watsonians	Scotland	
Scott Hastings	Watsonians	Scotland	
Ian Hunter	Northampton	England	
Robert Jones	Swansea	Wales	
Dewi Morris	Orrell	England	
Andy Nicol	Dundee HSFP	Scotland	Temporary replacement for Robert Jones
Rory Underwood	Leicester and RAF	England	
Tony Underwood	Leicester	England	
Richard Wallace	Garryowen	Ireland	Replacement for Ian Hunter

=== Forwards ===
Name	Club	National team	Notes
Martin Bayfield	Northampton	England	
Paul Burnell	London Scottish	Scotland	
Ben Clarke	Bath	England	
Damian Cronin	London Scottish	Scotland	
Wade Dooley	Preston Grasshoppers	England	Left the tour to return home for the funeral of his father
Mick Galwey	Shannon	Ireland	
Martin Johnson	Leicester	England	Replacement for Wade Dooley
Jason Leonard	Harlequins	England	
Kenny Milne	Heriot's FP	Scotland	
Brian Moore	Harlequins	England	
Nick Popplewell	Greystones	Ireland	
Andy Reed	Bath	Scotland	
Dean Richards	Leicester	England	
Mike Teague	Gloucester	England	
Richard Webster	Swansea	Wales	
Peter Winterbottom	Harlequins	England	
Peter Wright	Boroughmuir	Scotland	

== Schedule ==
Date	Opponent	Location	Result	Score
22 May	North Auckland	Whangārei	Won	17–30
26 May	North Harbour	Auckland	Won	29–13
29 May	New Zealand Māori	Wellington	Won	20–24
2 June	Canterbury	Lancaster Park, Christchurch	Won	10–28
5 June	Otago	Dunedin	Lost	37–24
8 June	Southland	Invercargill	Won	16–34
12 June	New Zealand	Lancaster Park, Christchurch	Lost	20–18
16 June	Taranaki	New Plymouth	Won	25–49
19 June	Auckland	Auckland	Lost	23–18
22 June	Hawke's Bay	McLean Park, Napier	Lost	29–17
26 June	New Zealand	Athletic Park, Wellington	Won	7–20
29 June	Waikato	Hamilton	Lost	38–10
3 July	New Zealand	Eden Park, Auckland	Lost	30–13

Played	Won	Drawn	Lost
13	7	0	6

== Test series ==
=== First test ===
The first test was won by New Zealand.

12 June 1993

New Zealand	20–18	British Lions

Lancaster Park, Christchurch
Referee: Brian Kinsey (Australia)

=== Second test ===
The Lions won the second Test, with a particularly strong performance by Ben Clarke.

26 June 1993

New Zealand	7–20	British Lions
Try: Clarke c Con: Fox	Report	Try: R. Underwood m Pen: G. Hastings (4); Drop: Andrew

Athletic Park, Wellington
Attendance: 39,000

FB	15	John Timu
RW	14	John Kirwan
OC	13	Frank Bunce
IC	12	Eroni Clarke
LW	11	Va'aiga Tuigamala
FH	10	Grant Fox
SH	9	Jon Preston
N8	8	Zinzan Brooke
OF	7	Michael Jones
BF	6	Jamie Joseph
RL	5	Mark Cooksley
LL	4	Robin Brooke
TP	3	Olo Brown
HK	2	Sean Fitzpatrick (c)
LP	1	Craig Dowd
Coach:
(New Zealand) Laurie Mains

FB	15	(Scotland) Gavin Hastings (c)
RW	14	(Wales) Ieuan Evans
OC	13	(Wales) Scott Gibbs
IC	12	(England) Jeremy Guscott
LW	11	(England) Rory Underwood
FH	10	(England) Rob Andrew
SH	9	(England) Dewi Morris
N8	8	(England) Dean Richards
OF	7	(England) Peter Winterbottom
BF	6	(England) Ben Clarke
RL	5	(England) Martin Bayfield
LL	4	(England) Martin Johnson
TP	3	(England) Jason Leonard
HK	2	(England) Brian Moore
LP	1	(Ireland) Nick Popplewell
Coach:
(Scotland) Ian McGeechan

=== Third test ===
Thus the series came down to the third Test decider at Eden Park. The Lions took a 10–0 lead, but New Zealand, helped by strong local support, recovered to easily win 30–13.

3 July 1993

New Zealand	30–13	British Lions
Try: Bunce 27' c Fitzpatrick 31' c Preston 66' c Con: Fox (3); Pen: Fox (3) 43', 57', 73'	Report	Try: Gibbs 23' c Con: G. Hastings; Pen: G. Hastings (2) 18', 51'

Eden Park, Auckland
Attendance: 47,000
Referee: Patrick Robin (France)

FB	15	John Timu
RW	14	John Kirwan
OC	13	Frank Bunce
IC	12	Lee Stensness
LW	11	Va'aiga Tuigamala
FH	10	Grant Fox
SH	9	Jon Preston
N8	8	Arran Pene
OF	7	Michael Jones
BF	6	Jamie Joseph
RL	5	Ian Jones
LL	4	Robin Brooke
TP	3	Olo Brown
HK	2	Sean Fitzpatrick (c)
LP	1	Craig Dowd
Replacements:
LK	16	Mark Cooksley
N8	17	Zinzan Brooke
CE	18	Matthew Cooper
SH	19	Ant Strachan
HK	20	Graham Dowd
PR	21	Bull Allen
Coach:
(New Zealand) Laurie Mains

FB	15	(Scotland) Gavin Hastings (c)
RW	14	(Wales) Ieuan Evans
OC	13	(Wales) Scott Gibbs
IC	12	(England) Jeremy Guscott
LW	11	(England) Rory Underwood
FH	10	(England) Rob Andrew
SH	9	(England) Dewi Morris
N8	8	(England) Dean Richards
OF	7	(England) Peter Winterbottom
BF	6	(England) Ben Clarke
RL	5	(England) Martin Bayfield
LL	4	(England) Martin Johnson
TP	3	(England) Jason Leonard
HK	2	(England) Brian Moore
LP	1	(Ireland) Nick Popplewell
Replacements:
FB	16	(Wales) Tony Clement
CE	17	(England) Will Carling
SH	18	(Wales) Robert Jones
PR	19	(Scotland) Paul Burnell
HK	20	(Scotland) Kenny Milne
FL	21	(England) Mike Teague
Coach:
(Scotland) Ian McGeechan
