= Sam Bland =

English rugby union player

- Born: 19 July 2007 (age 19) England
- Height: 1.91 m (6 ft 3 in)
- School: Settle College, Bishop Burton College

Rugby union career
- Position: Tight-head Prop
- Current team: Harlequins
Youth career
- 2014-2023: Wharfedale RUFC
- 2023-2025: Bishop Burton ACE
- 2023-2025: Yorkshire Academy
Senior career
Years	Team	Apps	(Points)
2026-	Harlequins	2	(0)
2025-	Esher	5	(5)
2026-	Tonbridge Juddians RFC	1	(0)
- Correct as of 10 March 2026
International career
Years	Team	Apps	(Points)
2024-	England under-18	4	(0)
- Correct as of 10 March 2026

Sam Bland (born 19 July 2007) is an English professional rugby union player who plays for Harlequins.

== Career ==
=== Junior Career ===
Bland began his rugby career at 7 joining North Yorkshire side, Wharfedale RUFC. Strong performances with the side led to him being selected by Yorkshire to join their DPP programme and in 2023 he joined the Yorkshire Rugby Academy to play in the Premiership U18. At the same time he joined Bishop Burton College, playing for the school in the RFU ACE League.

=== Harlequins ===
In mid-2025, Bland signed a senior academy contract with PREM Rugby side Harlequins.

On February 21, 2026, Bland made his debut against Leicester Tigers in the 9th round of the 2025–26 PREM Rugby Cup. He came off the bench in the 55th minute replacing Joe Jones in the front row, Bland conceded 4 penalties and a yellow card in the 33-27 loss.

He travelled down to Cornwall with a number of other Harlequin players for a mid-season training camp before playing in a friendly against Champ Rugby side Cornish Pirates, coming off the bench in the 66-10 win.

=== Esher ===
Bland was loaned out to Esher in National Two East, making his debut coming off the bench against Havant RFC scoring a last minute try to seal a second last-gasp win.

=== Tonbridge Juddians ===
He was also loaned out to National League One side Tonbridge Juddians RFC. His first appearance for the side coming in a tight 28-31 win over Sedgley Park RUFC.

=== England U18 ===
In September 2024, he was invited to the England U18 front-five camp squad. Then in October 2024, Bland was called up to a 60-man England U18 development camp at Bisham Abbey. Later in November he joined up again at Bisham Abbey for another England U18 training camp. He was also named in the final training squad ahead of the Under-18 Six Nations Festival.

His debut for the under-18 side came against Ireland under-18 in a friendly in Cork ahead of the Under-18 Six Nations Festival. He played in all of England matches in the Under-18 Six Nations Festival, coming off the bench against France and Scotland, while starting against Spain.
