= Andy Dun =

England international rugby union player

- Full name: Andrew Frederick Dun
- Born: 26 November 1960 Bristol, England
- Died: 23 July 2023 (aged 62)

Rugby union career
- Position: Flanker
International career
Years	Team	Apps	(Points)
1984	England	1	(0)

Andrew Frederick Dun (26 November 1960 — 23 July 2023) was an English rugby union international.

Dun was born and raised in Bristol, attending Bristol Grammar School.

A back row forward, Dun played for Bristol between 1980 and 1990, appearing in 170 senior matches, with two seasons as club captain. While undergoing his medical training at St Bartholomew's Hospital, Dun played for London club Wasps and stood in for Nigel Melville as club captain in the 1983–84 season. He was a Middlesex county player and got capped once for England, against Wales at Twickenham during the 1984 Five Nations Championship.

Dun is the father of Bristol Bears player James Dun.

== See also ==
- List of England national rugby union players
