= Graham Dowd =

NZ international rugby union player

- Born: Graham William Dowd; 17 December 1963 (age 62) Takapuna
- Height: 1.83 m (6 ft 0 in)
- Weight: 105 kg (231 lb)

Rugby union career
- Position(s): Prop, hooker
Amateur team(s)
Years	Team	Apps	(Points)
- Takapuna
Provincial / State sides
Years	Team	Apps	(Points)
1985–94	North Harbour	107	
International career
Years	Team	Apps	(Points)
1992	New Zealand	1	(0)

Graham William Dowd (born 17 December 1963) is a former rugby union player for the national team of New Zealand, the All Blacks. He was born in Takapuna.

Dowd played provincial rugby for Auckland Colts, and then from 1985 for North Harbour. He initially played as a prop, but in 1988 was switched to hooker by his North Harbour coach Peter Thorburn. His success in his new position meant that by 1991 he was considered the second best hooker in the country, behind Sean Fitzpatrick. That year Dowd played for a New Zealand XV that beat Romania, and a New Zealand B team that beat Australia B. He was selected ahead of Warren Gatland for the All Blacks team for the 1991 Rugby World Cup.

Dowd did not play even a minute of rugby during the 1991 World Cup, and was instead confined to the reserves bench. This was repeated in 1992 when Dowd was selected for the series against an International XV, but Fitzpatrick played every minute of the three Test matches. Dowd finally made his All Black debut against Ireland that same year, when he replaced Richard Loe at prop. It would be Dowd's only ever Test appearance, but he did play in seven mid-week matches for the All Blacks that year during their tours of Australia and South Africa. He was selected in the New Zealand squad for the British Lions series in 1993, but again achieved no game time.

It was Dowd's lot to spend most of his All Black career as an understudy to Sean Fitzpatrick during Fitzpatrick's peak years as the starting hooker. Dowd was part of multiple All Black squads in that period. Earlier in his career, he had not been a likely candidate for All Black selection.

By 1994 Dowd had been overtaken by Norm Hewitt as Fitzpatrick's back-up, and he never represented the All Blacks again. His provincial career finished that year, when he played his in the National Provincial Championship Final for North Harbour against Auckland – it was his 107th match for the province. He was finally awarded his All Blacks' cap at a capping ceremony in 2011 – 19 years after his sole Test match.
