= James Dun =

English rugby union player

- Born: James Andrew Dun; 7 July 1999 (age 27) Bath, England
- Height: 1.98 m (6 ft 6 in)
- Weight: 120 kg (18 st 13 lb)

Rugby union career
- Position(s): Lock, Flanker
- Current team: Harlequins
Senior career
| Years | Team | Apps | (Points) |
| 2026– | Harlequins | 2 | (0) |
| 2018-26 | Bristol Bears | 68 | (25) |
- Correct as of 29 September 2026
Provincial / State sides
| Years | Team | Apps | (Points) |
| 2022-23 | Jersey Reds | 18 | (10) |
International career
| Years | Team | Apps | (Points) |
- England U18, U20

James Dun (born 7 July 1999) is an English rugby union player who plays for Prem Rugby club Harlequins.

== Club career ==
In November 2025, he signed for Harlequins ahead of the 2026–27 season.
