= Harlequin F.C. =

English rugby union club, based in Twickenham

Harlequins
- Full name: Harlequins Rugby Football Club
- Union: Middlesex RFU
- Nickname(s): Quins, The Entertainers, The Quarters
- Founded: 1866; 160 years ago (as "Hampstead Football Club")
- Location: Twickenham, London, England
- Region: London Borough of Richmond
- Ground: Twickenham Stoop (Note: Harlequins also operate a ground-share agreement with the RFU, to play two showpiece home fixtures per season, known as The Big Game and The Big Summer Kick Off, at Twickenham Stadium.) (Capacity: 14,800)
- Chairman: David Morgan
- CEO: Laurie Dalrymple
- Director of Rugby: vacant
- Coach: Jason Gilmore
- Captain: Alex Dombrandt
- Most appearances: Danny Care (386)
- Top scorer: Nick Evans (2249)
- Most tries: Dan Lambert (253)
- League: PREM Rugby
- 2025–26: 9th of 10
1st kit	2nd kit

Official website
- quins.co.uk

Harlequins (officially Harlequin Football Club) is a professional rugby union club that plays in the Gallagher PREM, the top level of English rugby union. Their home ground is the Twickenham Stoop, located in Twickenham, in the London Borough of Richmond upon Thames.

The club, which was founded in 1866 as "Hampstead Football Club", split the following year with some of the membership forming Wasps RFC. Three years later Hampstead renamed itself Harlequins and became one of the founding members of the Rugby Football Union in 1871. For more than a hundred years, Harlequins had been one of the top UK teams during the amateur era and this continued with the introduction of professionalism in 1995. The club has been champions of England twice, winning the title in 2012 and most recently in 2021. They won the European Challenge Cup in 2001, 2004 and 2011, the joint most wins of any team in the competition, and the domestic cup in 1988, 1991 and 2013. It remains the only founding club member of the RFU to still be in the top flight of English rugby.

Harlequins has the largest social media following of any club in the Premiership, the 2nd largest of any club in Europe, after Stade Toulousain.

The current club captain is Alex Dombrandt and head coach is Jason Gilmore for the 2026–27 season.

== History ==
=== Formation and early years ===
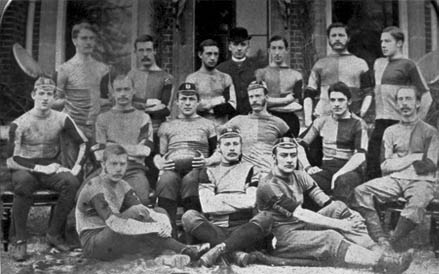
A Harlequin F.C. team c. 1881

The Hampstead Football Club was founded in 1866 and the first recorded game took place in 1867. A disagreement between Club Secretary William Titchener and William Alford in 1867 resulted in Alford leaving with half of the membership to form the club now known as Wasps. The club was renamed Harlequin Rugby Football Club in 1870, supposedly because the membership was no longer purely local and to retain the previously created "HFC" monogram mark. The word 'Harlequin' (Arlecchino, a comic servant from the commedia dell'arte) was found in a dictionary and all present agreed to the new name.

During its first 40 years the club played at a total of 15 venues. Since 1909, they have only played at three.

In 1906, the club was invited by the Rugby Football Union to use the new national stadium in Twickenham. In those early days, only one or two internationals were played there during the season, and before long Twickenham became the headquarters of the Harlequin Football Club.

=== 1961, first East Africa tour ===
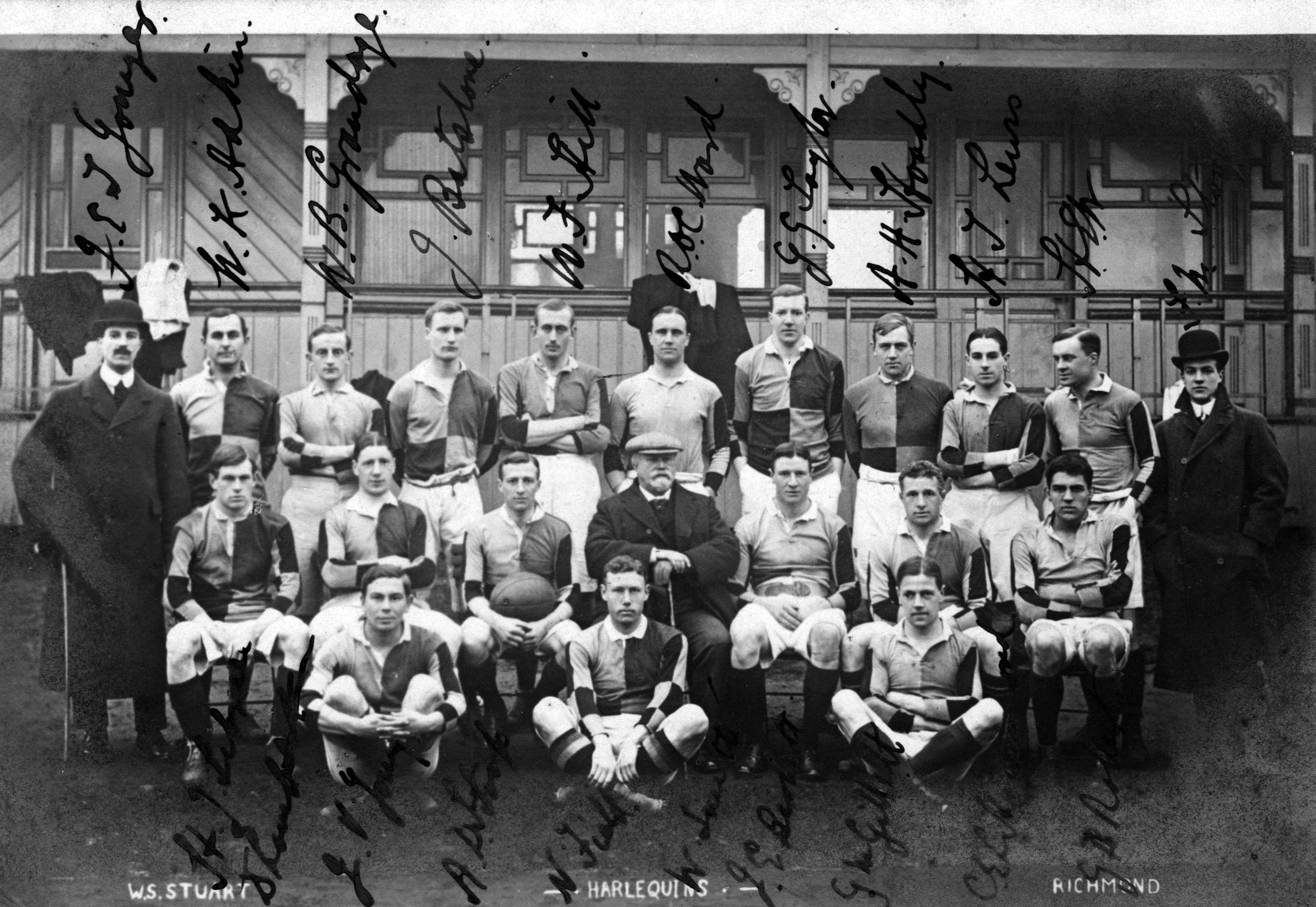
A Harlequin F.C. team before World War I

In 1961, Harlequins undertook a tour of East Africa in conjunction with Pretoria Harlequins from South Africa, as guests of the Kenya Harlequin F.C. and the Rugby Football Union of East Africa; the club won five and drew one. The tour is notable for two facts, it was the first time that three sister clubs of the Harlequin family all played each other in a coordinated series of matches and at 19 days it was the longest overseas tour undertaken by a British club up to that time. Despite this, the tour pales to insignificance when it is realised the Pretoria club spent four weeks in East Africa playing eight matches and another in Rhodesia on the way home.

The London club arrived at Entebbe airport at dawn on 4 May and opened their tour with a 44–13 win against Uganda in Kampala on 6 May. They played West Kenya Province at Kitale (winning 24–6), and the Pretoria Harlequins on Saturday 13 May at the RFUEA ground, Nairobi (winning 13 – 11). The next two matches were played at the same location, beating the host club 16–0 the next day and earning a 9-all tie against Kenya Central Province on Wednesday 17 May. The last match for the London club was against Kenya at Nakuru on Saturday 20 May (winning 8–0). This last match was played under a typical "long-rains" shower that, though heavy, did not soften the hard ground enough to be a problem.

=== Acquisition of The Stoop ===
In 1963, Harlequin FC acquired an athletics ground with 14 acres (57,000 m^{2}) just over the road from the Twickenham ground, which became its training pitch. This subsequently became their home: the Stoop Memorial Ground which in 2005 was renamed The Twickenham Stoop. This is named after Adrian Dura Stoop, who won 15 caps for England and is said to have been the person who developed modern back play.

=== League rugby and the professional era ===
With the introduction of leagues in 1987 bringing a more competitive environment, Harlequins maintained their status in the Premier Division as one of England's top 12 clubs until 2005.

The club has won the Rugby Football Union clubs knockout competition on two occasions: the John Player Cup in 1988 and Pilkington Cup in 1991. In addition, they played in the finals of 1992, 1993 and 2001.

Harlequins hold the world record for providing the most players from one club (8) in a Rugby World Cup final. In the second ever RWC final at Twickenham in November 1991, seven Harlequin players appeared for England (Will Carling, Simon Halliday, Jason Leonard, Brian Moore, Paul Ackford, Mickey Skinner, Peter Winterbottom) and Troy Coker played in the Australian pack.

They are also affiliated with amateur team Harlequin Amateurs.

Harlequins became the first British team to win the European Shield in 2001, defeating Narbonne 42–33 in the final. They then became the first team to win the tournament twice, defeating Montferrand 27–26 in the final of the renamed Parker Pen Challenge Cup on 22 May 2004.

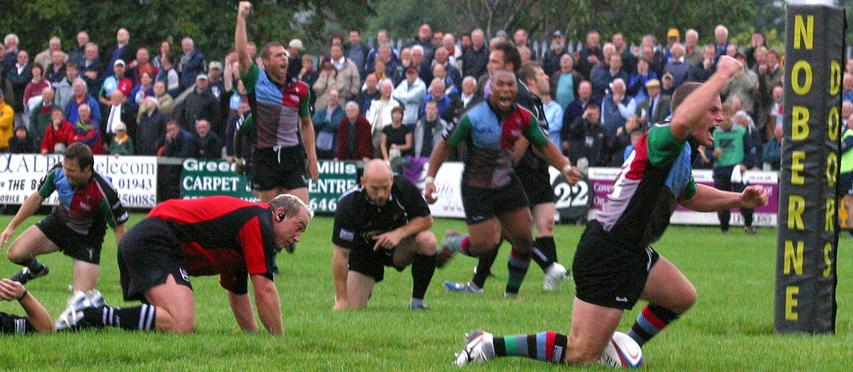
Harlequins celebrating a try during the 2005–06 season.

In 2005 they were relegated to National Division One after finishing at the bottom of the Zurich Premiership. In July of that year they announced that they would be establishing a partnership with rugby league club London Broncos, which saw the two clubs sharing Harlequins home ground The Stoop from the start of the 2006 Super League season. As part of the deal, the Broncos changed their name to Harlequins RL, though the two clubs remain under separate ownership.

In 2005–06, Quins utterly dominated National Division One. They won 25 of their 26 league matches, including their first 19, losing only at Exeter Chiefs on 25 February 2006. Quins also averaged nearly 40 points per match, scored four or more tries in 20 matches, and racked up an average victory margin of slightly over 25 points. They secured their return to the Premiership on 1 April with four matches to spare, crushing Sedgley Park 65–8 while the only team with a mathematical chance of pipping them for the title, Bedford, lost 26–23 at Exeter.

For the 2008 tour to New Zealand, England coach Martin Johnson selected four Harlequin players to play for the tour, Nick Easter, David Strettle, Mike Brown and Danny Care. Also five Harlequin players were selected for the England Saxons Barclays Churchill Cup matches to the United States and Canada. Tom Guest, Chris Robshaw, Adrian Jarvis, Ugo Monye and Will Skinner were all selected with Will Skinner chosen as captain for the side.

=== 2007–08 season ===
Chris Robshaw played a leading role in the 2007–08 season as Harlequins won 12 of their 22 Guinness Premiership matches and finished 6th in the league. Harlequins got off to a shaky start which saw them be in 2nd, 3rd 4th place consecutively, and during the latter half of the season Halequins managed to reach third after a string of seven wins out of nine, but defeats to London Irish, Sale Sharks and Leicester Tigers to finish the season meant that Quins dropped to sixth and missed out on the play-offs.

Two Harlequins players were short-listed for awards, Danny Care and Chris Robshaw, were short-listed for the Land Rover Discovery of the Season award. As well as Coach Dean Richards being short-listed for the O2 Director of Rugby of the Season as well as Tom Guest being nominated for MBNA Try of the Season for his try against Leeds Carnegie on Sunday 13 April 2008.

=== 2008–09 season ===
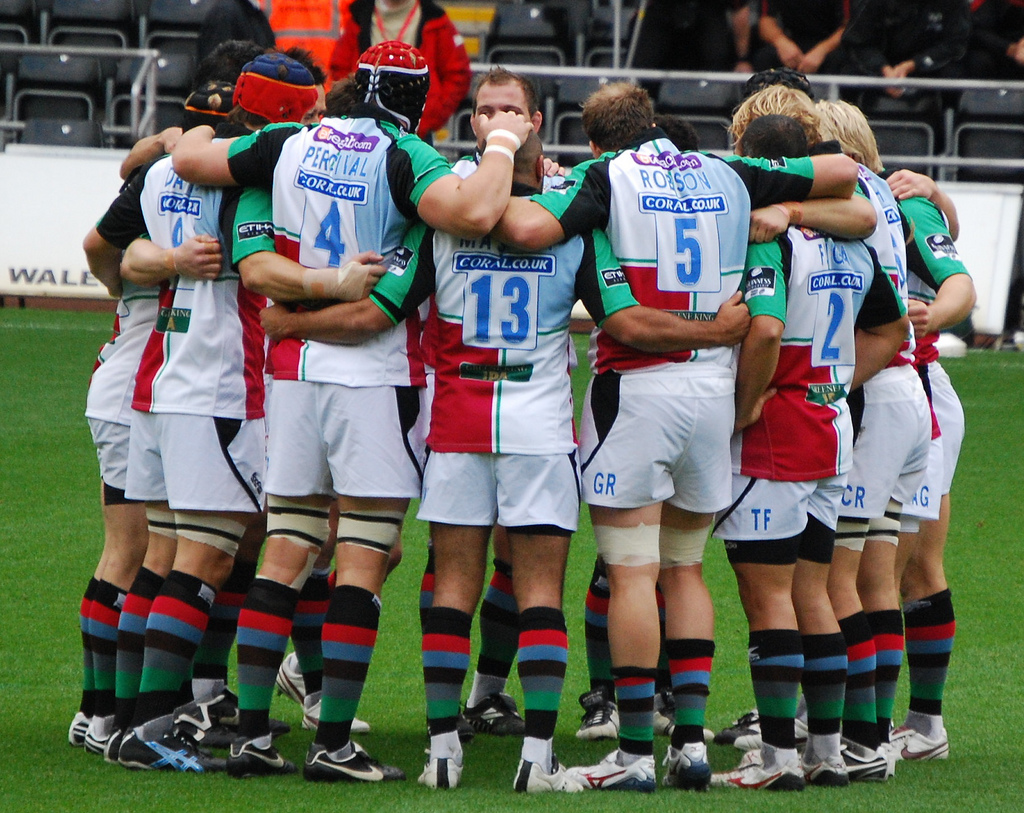
Harlequins in a huddle during the 2008–09 season.

Players to leave Quins at the end of the 2007–08 season were Adrian Jarvis, Hal Luscombe, Chris Hala'ufia, Paul Volley, Nicholas Spanghero, Simon Keogh, Ricky Nebbett and Ryan Manyika. For the 2008–09 season Quins signed five new players; London Irish centre Gonzalo Tiesi, Ulster Back-row forward Neil McMillan, Auckland Blues fly-half Nick Evans, Tongan international Epi Taione who plays on wing, centre and back row and Fijian utility back Waisea Luveniyali.

Quins finished second in the 2008-09 Guinness Premiership table. In the play-offs, they lost 0–17 at home to eventual losing finalists London Irish.

Quins also hosted their first "Big Game" at Twickenham over the Christmas period, playing out a 26–26 draw with Leicester Tigers in front of 52000 people.

In the 2008-09 Heineken Cup Harlequins came top of their pool, including beating Stade Français Paris both at home (thanks to a dramatic last play drop goal from Nick Evans) and away in front of 80000 people in the Stade de France in Paris. They lost 5–6 at the Stoop to eventual tournament winners Leinster Rugby at the quarter-final stage, a match in which the infamous Bloodgate Scandal took place.

=== 2009–10 season ===
The contrast between this season and the previous season could hardly have been greater. With the shadow of Bloodgate still hanging over the club, the club struggled to an 8th-place finish despite retaining most of the players from their successful previous campaign. They also made a swift exit from the Heineken Cup at the group stages while failing to chalk up a single victory in the competition. Owing to the club's lower league position, they failed to qualify for the competition for the first time in three years.

Quins also hosted their second "Big Game" at Twickenham. Despite losing 20–21 to "London" Wasps, the game attracted 76000 spectators.

Following the resignation of Dean Richards in August 2009, Conor O'Shea was appointed Director of Rugby in March 2010.

=== 2010–11 season ===
Harlequins endured a mixed 2010–11 season, which was characterised by inconsistency. They finished seventh in the league, which was insufficient to ensure Heineken Cup qualification. However, they proved their potential with some inspiring performances on their way to the Amlin Cup final. This included a historic win away against Munster in the semi-final, where they became only the second club to beat the Irish province at home in a European Competition. Harlequins won the final (19–18) against Stade Français Paris to win its 3rd Amlin Cup.

=== 2011–2012 season ===
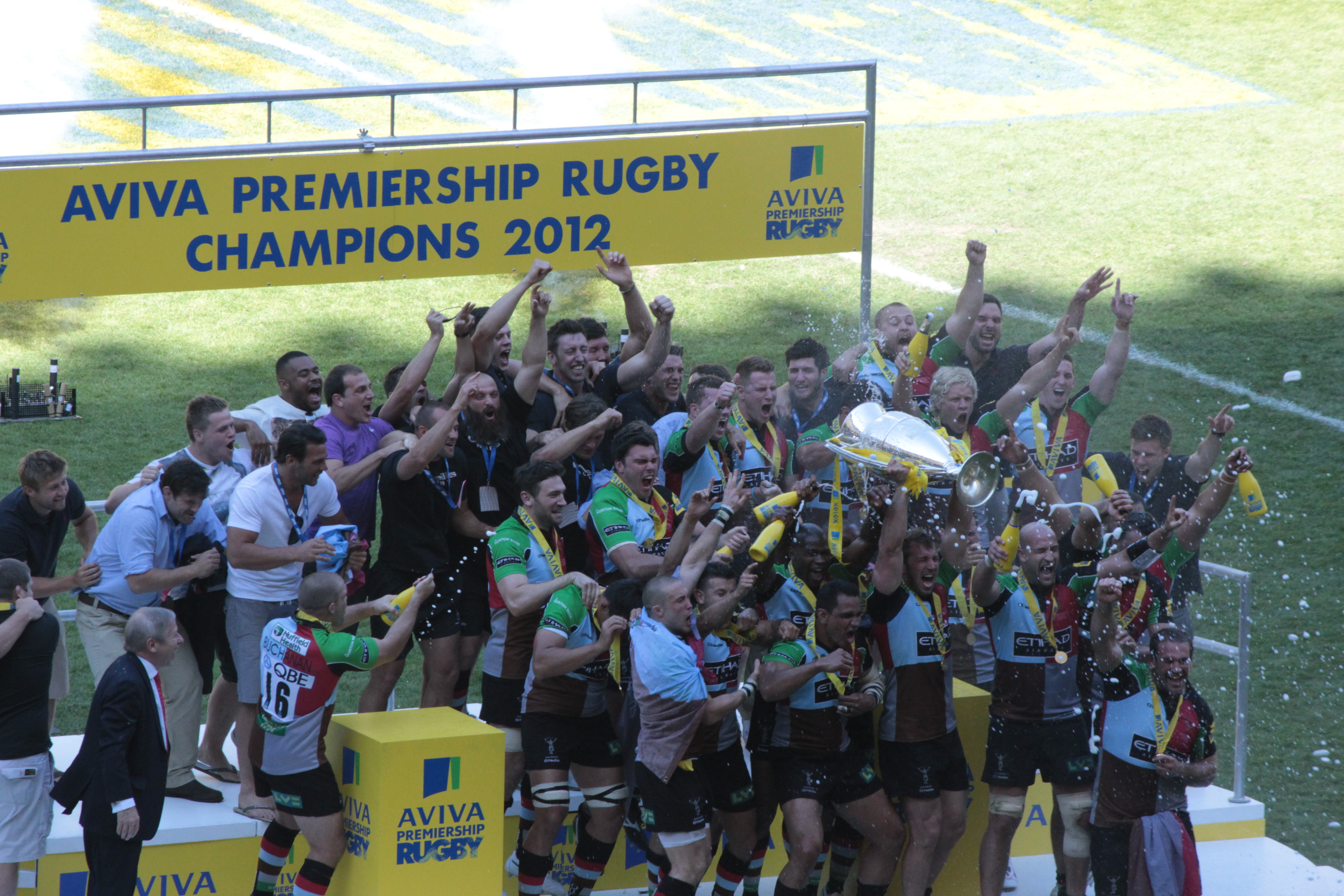
2011–12 English Premiership winners

Harlequins started the season well, winning their first ten premiership games before losing to Saracens at Twickenham Stadium in "Big Game 4" in front of a then club record for a premiership crowd and a world record for the highest attendance of a regular season club fixture, consisting of 82,000. The club's results after the defeat to Saracens continued to be generally strong, with only three other defeats in the regular season and the club went on to finish top of the league. They played Northampton Saints at the Twickenham Stoop on 12 May 2012, a match which they won thanks to a 25–23 victory sealed with a try in the 77th minute by Joe Marler. Harlequins beat Leicester Tigers on 26 May 2012, in the Premiership final at Twickenham Stadium to win their first Aviva Premiership title with a score of 30–23 in front of an 81,779 crowd. Tom Williams and Chris Robshaw scored the tries and Nick Evans scored 20 points through penalties and a conversion. Chris Robshaw was named man of the match. Nick Evans also equalled the record at the time for the most conversions by one player in a Premiership final with six.

During this season, Harlequins played in the Heineken Cup thanks to their victory in the Amlin Cup the season before. However, they lost out on a quarter final spot in the last game of the pool stage after a defeat to Connacht. Subsequently, they went into the Amlin Cup competition but were resoundingly beaten by Toulon. Harlequins also played in the LV= Cup but did not make it out of their group with two wins and two losses.

=== 2012–2013 season ===
Harlequins started their 2012–2013 season with four straight wins before suffering a first setback at the hands of Saracens at home in round 5 and at Exeter Chiefs in round 6. The club then managed to stay within the first two places of the table. On 29 December Big Game 5 proved to be a success with a 26–15 win over London Irish before a capacity crowd of 82,000 at Twickenham Stadium. Later in the season, the second setback came in the return game against Exeter when the Chiefs defeated Harlequins. The slide continued as they suffered back-to-back defeats against Saracens and Gloucester. They secured their place in the play-offs, but lost to Leicester at Welford Road in the semi-final 33–16.

Having qualified for the 2012-13 Heineken Cup on the virtue of their 2012 English Premiership title, Harlequins produced a strong showing in the pool stage, remaining unbeaten in pool 3 against Biarritz Olympique, Connacht Rugby and Zebre to be granted No. 1 seed for the quarter-finals. However, they lost to No. 8 seed Munster at home 12–18 in the quarter-final.

The LV= Cup featured a Harlequins team stripped of its players on international duty. Relying on a team of developing players, the club remained unbeaten throughout the pool stage. Harlequins beat Bath Rugby (31–23) in the semi-final at The Stoop, and defeated and Sale Sharks (32–14) in the final at Sixways Stadium. This was Harlequins' third title in the English/Anglo-Welsh Cup and the first since the inception of the Anglo-Welsh format. This title granted Harlequins a place in the 2013-14 Heineken Cup.

=== 2013–2014 season ===
==== Aviva Premiership ====
Harlequins made a disappointing start to the new season suffering two defeats in their opening two home games against Northampton and Saracens. Injuries stalled their start to the season, and they found themselves in seventh after five games. Their season did eventually improve and they did begin to challenge for a top four spot. But four consecutive away defeats set them back again. They were left in sixth place, six points behind fourth, with four games left to play. A series of several closely fought wins including a try bonus point in the penultimate game against Exeter Chiefs ensured they would face a winner takes all home tie against Bath in the final round of the regular season. A 19–16 win in this game saw them march on to a semi-final at Allianz Park having finished level on points with Bath but crucially winning one more game. Saracens won the semi-final to end Quins' hopes, beating them 31–17.

==== Heineken Cup and Europe ====
Harlequins also made a poor start in Europe suffering a 26–33 home defeat against Scarlets before being beaten at Clermont Auvergne. They replied strongly with back to back wins over Racing Metro. They lost their next home game against Clermont after they lost a 13–3 lead. They did win their last game at Scarlets to secure a place in the second tier Amlin Challenge Cup competition. They won their quarter final 29–6 at Stade Francais, but lost to Northampton Saints in the next round.

=== 2014–2015 season ===
==== Aviva Premiership ====
Harlequins were inconsistent at the start of the season and won half of their opening six games before heading into Europe.

The rest of the season saw this pattern continue and Quins finished 8th.

==== European Rugby Champions Cup ====
Harlequins beat Castres Olympique in the first ever European Rugby Champions Cup match before an away win at Wasps and defeating Leinster at home. However, subsequent losses away to Leinster, and then at home to Wasps ensured Harlequins finished third in their group and were knocked out of the tournament.

=== 2015–2016 season ===
==== Aviva Premiership ====
The start of the 2015/16 season was delayed by the 2015 Rugby World Cup. However Harlequins made a strong start having a good first half to the season. They were in 3rd place in mid-January.

One of the highlights of the seasons was the home defeat of Saracens. At that time Quins hadn't beaten Saracens for 4 years and Saracens were unbeaten in their first eight games of the season.

Following this game Quins' form deteriorated, first giving away a 9-point lead at Newcastle followed by a home defeat by Northampton when fly half Ben Botica failed to kick the ball out of the play when the game had finished. It was the start of a run of 7 defeats in 9 games and, after being thrashed by the Exeter Chiefs on the final day of the season 24–62, Quins failed to earn a place in the European Champions Cup, finishing in 7th; one place below the top six finish required to qualify.

==== European Rugby Challenge Cup ====
Quins put in a very strong performance in the group stage of the Challenge Cup, topping their pool and winning all of their first five games with a bonus point. This gave them a home quarter final.

They fought back from 18 to 30 down against London Irish to win and reach a home semi-final against Grenoble, they comfortably won that game to set up a final against Montpellier in Lyon. After their League form had left them out of the Champions Cup places, they needed victory to ensure a place in the competition next season. They slipped to a 26–9 deficit and got within 7 points but Ben Botica inexplicably kicked the ball out of play in his last game before heading to Montpellier to hand his new club the title, leaving Quins as runners-up and out of the Champions Cup for a second consecutive season.

=== The John Kingston Era (2016-2018) ===
Following Conor O'Shea's departure at the end of the 2015/16 season, Quins appointed John Kingston, then head coach, as his successor. A strong end to Kingston's first season left Quins on the brink of European Champions Cup qualification for the first time in three seasons.

It was achieved after a bonus point away at Northampton Saints on the last day of the season secured sixth place, with the Saints themselves missing out on games won.

Following the 2017/18 season, Kingston left Harlequins by mutual consent after 17 years of service to the club. His final home game featured a walk of honour around the stadium as thousands of fans applauded.

=== 2018 to present ===
==== 2018–19 season ====
Harlequins then turned to appointing England defence coach Paul Gustard. At the same time, a number of coaches departed, or moved into smaller roles including Mark Mapletoft and Nick Easter, who had previously been head coach and defence coach before Gustard's appointment. After a patchy start to the 2018–19 season, Harlequins went on a five-match winning run in the Premiership to move up to third, seven points clear of third place Gloucester.

Quins would have all-but sealed a place in the playoffs with victory, but were hammered 29–7 in front of their own fans, as Gloucester claimed a bonus point victory to move within touching distance of the London club. Ill-disciplined defeats at Saracens and Sale followed before a defining moment against Northampton Saints. Quins were within 90 seconds of recording a victory which would have effectively ended the hopes of Northampton and given themselves fresh momentum as the season headed into its last few games, but a try from Alex Mitchell, helped by a lack of defensive numbers on the blindside, gave Saints the victory and brought them up to fifth, right on Quins' tail.

A late penalty miss saw Quins narrowly beaten at Exeter, and though they managed to beat Leicester in the penultimate weekend, defeat on the final day against Wasps would see them miss out on the play-offs. They were tied on points with Saints, but missed out due to fewer match wins, finishing fifth overall. James Lang's late penalty attempt would have won them the game, and secured their place in the play-offs had it gone over, but it was inexplicably taken at least a metre behind where it had been awarded in the view of TV pundit and former player Austin Healey and ultimately fell under the crossbar by "the distance Austin was talking about that they were marched back," according to fellow pundit and his former teammate Ben Kay.

In the Challenge Cup, Harlequins put together an impressive run, topping their group before edging Worcester Warriors in the quarter-final to book a semi-final trip to Clermont Auvergne. An impressive second half fightback was not enough as they were beaten 32–27. They won just one of their four pool matches in the Premiership Cup, to bow out at the group stage.

==== 2019–20 season ====
Harlequins made 32 personnel changes after the 2018–19 season, as Gustard looked to freshen up his squad, and after only winning one of their first four games, Quins would remain unbeaten for the rest of the calendar year. However, a 48–10 defeat to Sale, their most comprehensive league defeat since defeat by the same margin against Exeter nearly four years earlier, and an early exit from Europe spelt a disappointing start to the season.

Quins would eventually finish 3rd in their Champions' Cup pool with home and away victories over Bath, but as their league form continued to fluctuate, their main contention for silverware would come in the Premiership Cup. Having earned a place in the semi-finals at the start of the season, whilst the World Cup took place, they hammered a young Exeter Chiefs side 49–22 away from home to reach the final. This was set for 15 March 2020, before being postponed due to the COVID-19 pandemic.

Following the resumption of the season, Quins recorded solid form to finish comfortably in sixth and earn qualification for the Champions Cup. Nonetheless, Gustard's hopes of a first trophy were dashed as the London club were beaten 27–19 against Sale in the Premiership Cup Final despite leading for most of the game.

==== 2020–21 season ====
Harlequins began their season with a 3–33 loss at home to Exeter Chiefs. By 10 January 2021, the club were positioned seventh in the Premiership table, failing to record a win at home and having also suffered a record 7–49 home defeat at the hands of Racing 92 in the Champions Cup.

On 20 January 2021, it was confirmed that Paul Gustard left his role as Harlequins Director of Rugby by mutual consent .

Harlequins went on to win 10 of their next 14 games, securing a fourth-place playoff position in the Premiership. On 19 June 2021, they played league leaders Bristol Bears at Ashton Gate, conceding 28 points in the first half an hour of the match to trail 28–0 before half-time. Harlequins went on to undertake the biggest comeback in Premiership Rugby history to finish the match 31–31 after 80 minutes, going on to win 36–43 after extra time to book their place in the final.

On 26 June 2021, Harlequins played Exeter Chiefs at Twickenham, defeating the incumbent champions 38–40 to win their second Premiership title. A number of records were broken during this game. During the match Louis Lynagh scored two late tries, equalling the record at the time for the most tries scored by any individual player in a final while also becoming the youngest ever try scorer in a Premiership final at just 20years and 205 days old. This final also set the record for having both the most points and most tries combined of any Premiership final in the history of the competition.

On 2 July 2021, it was confirmed that Tabai Matson would join the club as head coach for the 2021–22 season.

==== 2023–24 season ====
Following the financial collapse of London rival London Irish, Harlequins made a number of signings from their former rival including 20-year old England international Will Joseph, replacing the departing Joe Marchant who was joining Stade Français; England u-20 back rower Chandler Cunningham-South and prop Lovejoy Chawatama. This was on top of a number of other signings including England international, former Wasps captain and Harlequins academy member Joe Launchbury who joined the club on a multi-year deal.

Harlequins began their season with a narrow 29–28 loss to Gloucester. New signing Jarrod Evans had seemingly won the game in the final minutes by extending Harlequins' lead only for the try to be ruled out for foul play. Gloucester went on to win the game in the final play

In November 2023, they briefly went top of the Gallagher Premiership for the first time in the season after wins against Leicester Tigers, Bristol Bears and Exeter Chiefs. Many of the team's England and South Africa players, including Marcus Smith, Danny Care and André Esterhuizen were still returning to the starting XV having played at the 2023 Rugby World Cup.

In March 2024, it was announced that Director of Performance Development, Tabai Matson, would depart the club at the end of the season.

During their Champions Cup campaign, they defeated Glasgow Warriors 28–24 at home in the Round of 16 to win their first ever Champions Cup knockout tie. After a 42–41 away victory over Bordeaux Bègles in the quarter finals they reached their first ever semi-final in the competition. Despite a 'spirited' performance, they were defeated 38–26 at this stage by the eventual winners Toulouse at the Stadium de Toulouse.

==== 2024–25 season ====
In October 2024, they beat Saracens 17–10 to secure their first win over their rivals in four years. Later that month they beat Exeter Chiefs 36–19 to secure their first win at Sandy Park in 10 years, moving up to fifth in the table in the process. Before the 2024 Autumn Nations Series, England head coach Steve Borthwick announced the introduction of Enhanced Elite Player Squad (EPS) contracts designed to give the national team final say over medical matters and development programs. Marcus Smith became the first player at the club to be awarded one of these contracts. In December 2024, they lost 14–0 away to Gloucester, the first time in over 10 years that they had failed to score a point in a Premiership fixture.

That same month, Harlequins CEO, Laurie Dalrymple, revealed the club were looking into hosting an exhibition match overseas with Singapore being the ideal location.

In March 2025, they scored their first Premiership away victory over Saracens since the 2012 season. This was also the first time they had done the double over them since the 2008–09 season. The following week, Director of Rugby Billy Millard announced he would be leaving the club at the end of the season.

==== 2025–26 season ====
With just 15 days to go until the beginning of the 2025–26 season, head coach Danny Wilson, left the club to join Wales as an assistant coach. Defence coach Jason Gilmore was named as his successor.

In December 2025, they recorded their largest ever victory in the Champions Cup after a 68–14 win against Bayonne.

In March 2026, the club announced de facto head coach Jason Gilmore, would be promoted to the full time role while Robbie Deans would join from the following season onwards as Performance Director, working with the club on the ground for 12 weeks in the season, while the rest would be spent working remotely.

== Stadium ==
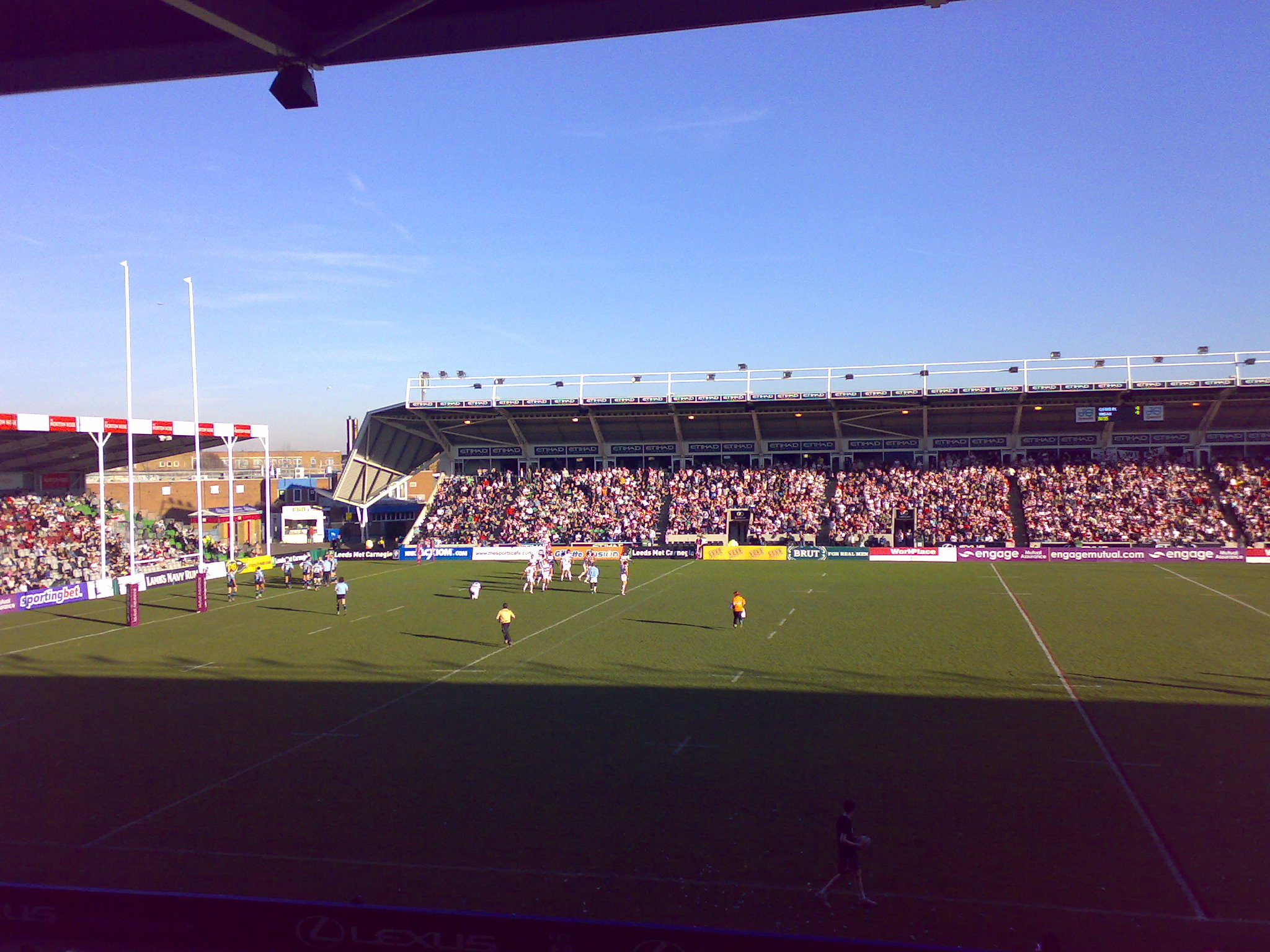
The Twickenham Stoop stadium

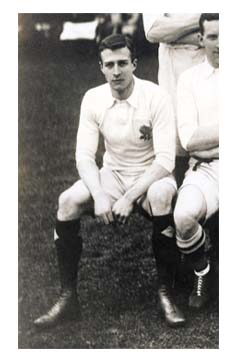
Adrian Dura Stoop

Harlequins play at the Twickenham Stoop, at Twickenham in London. The stadium is named after former England international Adrian Stoop, who was a Harlequins player and later president of the club.

The club acquired the then athletics pitch in 1963, a ground of 14 acres (5.7 ha), close by to the RFU ground. It became the training pitch, and eventually, the Harlequins home ground. The site provided a ground that could be extended, and there have been many upgrades since, leading to a current capacity of 14,800. The stadium was known as the Stoop Memorial Ground for many years, but it was renamed the Twickenham Stoop in 2005.

In 2017 Harlequins engaged with architects and considered plans to increase capacity to 25,000, but that has not progressed.

Harlequins also play two games at Twickenham Stadium, one in December called the Big Game, the other in June called the Big Summer Kick-Off.

== Harlequins Foundation ==
The Harlequins Foundation was set up in 2015 as an independent charity (1161838).

It delivers two flagship programmes: Switch – a women and girls project which aims to develop female leaders, and METTLE – a project that develops skills and knowledge to improve physical health and mental well-being for 9-12 year olds. The METTLE pilot was evaluated by St Mary's University and the programme was found to have had a positive impact on young people's self-confidence, wellbeing, decision making and mental resilience.

In September 2018, The Harlequins Foundation and The Movember Foundation announced a long-term partnership in joint initiative committed to help rugby fans, and the wider community, address the issues around men's health and provide information and guidance on what to do when mental health suffers.

The foundation delivers the Premiership Rugby Funded Programmes: Move like a Pro, Project Rugby, Tackling Health and Hitz.

Additionally the charity allocates grants to local organisations and charities in the local community.

In 2020 it was announced that The Harlequins Foundation would partner with The Duke of Edinburgh's Award and become the only Premiership Rugby club licensed to deliver the DofE.

== Rivalries ==
Harlequins maintain a number of rivalries across English rugby, namely teams in the Greater London area.

Many consider Harlequins' main rivalry to be Wasps RFC. Both clubs were originally founded as one club, Hampstead Football Club, in 1866. Wasps were founded as a result of a disagreement between members of the club a year later. Hampstead Football Club changed its name to Harlequins in 1870. Despite Wasps' move away from the London metro area to Coventry in 2014, the rivalry still persists because of its historical roots.

Other rivalries include Saracens F.C. and London Irish, both of whom are Premiership clubs that reside in north and west London respectively.

Since the financial collapse of both Wasps and London Irish during the 2022–23 season, Harlequins biggest rivalry has been with Saracens with many considering it to be the most bitter rivalry in the Premiership.

== Controversies ==
During the quarter-final of the 2009 Heineken Cup against Leinster, Harlequins wing Tom Williams came off the field with what turned out to be a faked blood injury to facilitate a tactical substitution of fly-half Nick Evans back onto the field. An investigation by the ERC and the RFU revealed that blood injuries had also been faked by Harlequins to enable tactical substitutions on four previous occasions. These findings resulted in a twelve-month ban for Williams – reduced to 4 months on appeal, a three-year ban for former director of rugby Dean Richards and a two-year ban for physiotherapist Steph Brennan as well as a £260,000 fine for the club. The club chairman Charles Jillings subsequently tendered his resignation while the club doctor Wendy Chapman was suspended by the General Medical Council for cutting Williams's lip to hide his use of the blood capsule. On 2 September 2009, it was reported that the club had narrowly escaped being thrown out of the Heineken Cup following the scandal when the board of organisers European Rugby Cup (ERC) said it approved of the bans and fines already handed out.

The affair was dubbed by many in the media "Bloodgate" with three proven incidents of the medical staff colluding with former director of rugby Dean Richards to abuse the blood-substitution rule. The rule was brought in to help with player welfare but was shown to have been abused by former policeman Richards, along with Dr Wendy Chapman, who was given an official warning by the General Medical Council.

== Kit ==
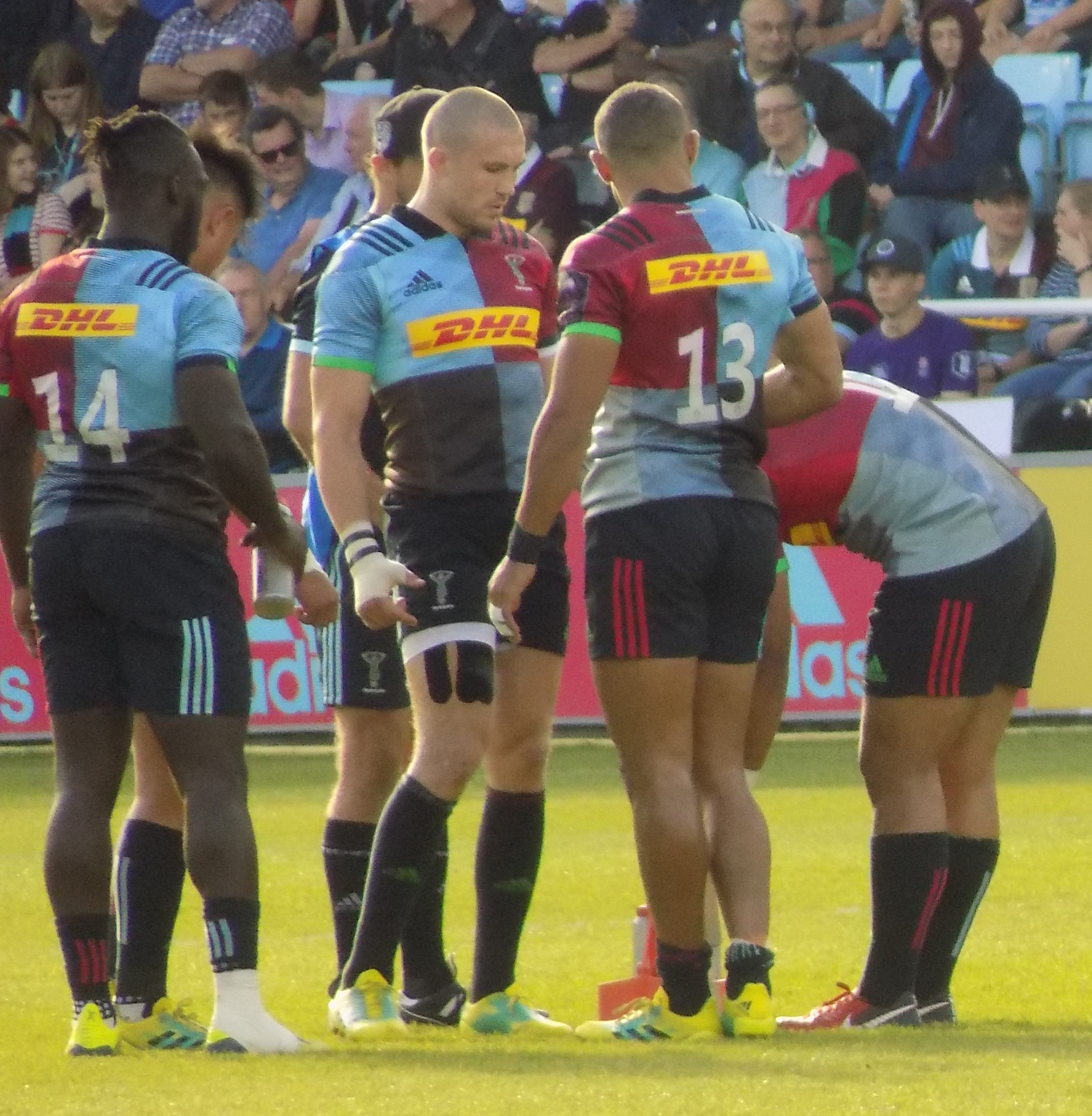
Harlequins in action during the 2018–19 season.

The Harlequins kit is one of the most distinctive in the game, and remained largely unchanged for many years. The kit has always featured a quartered shirt, typically consisting of chocolate brown, French grey, magenta and light blue with black and green sleeves, and most design changes have merely meant changes to the dimensions of the quarters, or the layout of the four main colours.

Following several Adidas home kit variations focused upon the four "Quins quarters" colours, the 2021–22 season home shirt sees a return to a more traditional design with the inclusion of green and black sleeves, whilst the 2020–22 away shirt in red and white features a stylised aerial representation of the London area and River Thames. In July 2022, The Harlequins announced that the club had signed a multi-year partnership deal with the British sportswear brand Castore ahead of the 2022–23 season. The partnership will see Castore both design and manufacture the men's and women's home kits, training and travel-wear in addition to the youth teams kit.

== Season summaries ==
	League Season				Domestic Cup		European Cup	
Season	Competition	Final Position	Points	Play-Offs	Competition	Performance	Competition	Performance
1987–88	Courage League Division 1	3rd	30	N/A	John Player Cup	Champions	No competition	N/A
1988–89	Courage League Division 1	8th	10	N/A	Pilkington Cup	Semi-final	No competition	N/A
1989–90	Courage League Division 1	7th	12	N/A	Pilkington Cup	3rd round	No competition	N/A
1990–91	Courage League Division 1	3rd	16	N/A	Pilkington Cup	Champions	No competition	N/A
1991–92	Courage League Division 1	8th	11	N/A	Pilkington Cup	Runners-up	No competition	N/A
1992–93	Courage League Division 1	8th	11	N/A	Pilkington Cup	Runners-up	No competition	N/A
1993–94	Courage League Division 1	6th	16	N/A	Pilkington Cup	Semi-final	No competition	N/A
1994–95	Courage League Division 1	8th	13	N/A	Pilkington Cup	Semi-final	No competition	N/A
1995–96	Courage League Division 1	3rd	26	N/A	Pilkington Cup	Quarter-final	No English teams	N/A
1996–97	Courage League Division 1	3rd	30	N/A	Pilkington Cup	Semi-final	Heineken Cup	Quarter-final
1997–98	Premiership	10th	16	N/A	Tetley's Bitter Cup	4th round	Heineken Cup	Quarter-final
1998–99	Premiership	4th	33	N/A	Tetley's Bitter Cup	Quarter-final	No English teams	N/A
1999–00	Premiership	10th	18	N/A	Tetley's Bitter Cup	Quarter-final	Heineken Cup	4th in pool
2000–01	Premiership	11th	38	N/A	Tetley's Bitter Cup	Runners-up	Challenge Cup	Champions
2001–02	Premiership	9th	35	N/A	Powergen Cup	Semi-final	Heineken Cup	3rd in pool
2002–03	Premiership	7th	44	–	Powergen Cup	Quarter-final	Challenge Cup	2nd round
2003–04	Premiership	6th	54	–	Powergen Cup	6th round	Challenge Cup	Champions
2004–05	Premiership	12th (R)	38	–	Powergen Cup	6th round	Heineken Cup	4th in pool
2005–06	National Division One	1st (P)	121	N/A	EDF Energy Trophy	Champions	Not qualified	N/A
2006–07	Premiership	7th	51	–	EDF Energy Cup	4th in pool	Challenge Cup	2nd in pool
2007–08	Premiership	6th	63	–	EDF Energy Cup	4th in pool	Heineken Cup	4th in pool
2008–09	Premiership	2nd	66	Semi-final	EDF Energy Cup	3rd in pool	Heineken Cup	Quarter-final
2009–10	Premiership	8th	46	–	LV= Cup	3rd in pool	Heineken Cup	4th in pool
2010–11	Premiership	7th	52	–	LV= Cup	Semi-final	Challenge Cup	Champions
2011–12	Premiership	1st	75	Champions	LV= Cup	2nd in pool	Challenge Cup*	Quarter-final*
2012–13	Premiership	3rd	69	Semi-final	LV= Cup	Champions	Heineken Cup	Quarter-final
2013–14	Premiership	4th	67	Semi-final	LV= Cup	3rd in pool	Challenge Cup*	Semi-final*
2014–15	Premiership	8th	49	–	LV= Cup	2nd in pool	Champions Cup	3rd in pool
2015–16	Premiership	7th	55	–	No competition	N/A	Challenge Cup	Runners-up
2016–17	Premiership	6th	52	-	Anglo-Welsh Cup	Semi-final	Challenge Cup	3rd in pool
2017–18	Premiership	10th	36	–	Anglo-Welsh Cup	2nd in pool	Champions Cup	4th in pool
2018–19	Premiership	5th	56	–	Premiership Cup	4th in pool	Challenge Cup	Semi-final
2019–20	Premiership	6th	51	-	Premiership Cup	Runners-up	Champions Cup	3rd in pool
2020–21	Premiership	4th	71	Champions	No competition	N/A	Challenge Cup*	Round of 16
2021–22	Premiership	3rd	80	Semi-final	Premiership Cup	3rd in pool	Champions Cup	Round of 16
2022–23	Premiership	6th	51	–	Premiership Cup	3rd in pool	Champions Cup	Round of 16
2023–24	Premiership	6th	51	–	Premiership Cup	2nd in pool	Champions Cup	Semi Final
2024–25	Premiership	7th	48	–	Premiership Cup	Quarter Final	Champions Cup	Round of 16
2025–26	Premiership	9th	31	–	Premiership Cup	4th in pool	Champions Cup	Round of 16

Gold background denotes champions
Silver background denotes runners-up
Pink background denotes relegated

* After dropping into the competition from the Champions Cup/Heineken Cup

== Club honours ==
=== Major honours ===
- Premiership Rugby
  - Champions: (2) 2011–12, 2020–21
- RFU Championship
  - Champions: (1) 2005–06
- European Challenge Cup
  - Champions: (3) 2000–01, 2003–04, 2010–11
  - Runners-up: (1) 2015–16
- RFU Knockout Cup
  - Champions: (2) 1987–88, 1990–91
  - Runners-up: (3) 1991–92, 1992–93, 2000–2001
- Anglo-Welsh Cup
  - Champions: (1) 2012–13
- Premiership Rugby Cup
  - Runners-up: (1) 2019–20
- EDF Energy Trophy
  - Champions: (1) 2005–06
- Middlesex RFU Senior Cup
  - Champions: (1) 1982–83

=== Reserves ===
- Premiership Rugby Shield
  - Champions: (2) 2003–04, 2012–13
  - Runners-up: (3) 2005–06, 2009–10, 2011–12

=== Friendly and Sevens ===
- Middlesex Sevens
  - Champions: (14) 1926, 1927, 1928, 1929, 1933, 1935, 1967, 1978, 1986, 1987, 1988, 1989, 1990, 2008
- Glengarth Sevens Davenport Plate
  - Champions: (1) 1986
- Cunningham Duncombe Series
  - Champions: (2) 2015, 2017
- Melrose Sevens
  - Champions: (2) 1987, 2017
- Kilmarnock Sevens
  - Champions: (2) 1984, 1985
- London City Sevens
  - Champions: (1) 2025

== Current squad ==
The Harlequins squad for the 2026–27 season is:

Harlequins 2026–27 Premiership Rugby squad
**Props**: (England) **Fin Baxter** (Note: Fin Baxter is jointly contracted with the RFU, via an enhanced England Elite Player Squad (EPS) contract.); (England) Ethan Clarke; (Argentina) **Pedro Delgado**; (England) Will Hobson; (Australia) **Harry Johnson-Holmes**; (Samoa) **Titi Lamositele**; (South Africa) Sampie Swiegers; (Argentina) **Boris Wenger**; (England) **Harry Williams**; **Hookers**: (England) Jack Musk; (England) Sam Riley; (England) Jack Walker; **Locks**: (England) Harry Browne; (England) James Dun; (Argentina) **Guido Petti**; (Ireland) **Kieran Treadwell**	**Back row**: (England) Zach Carr; (England) James Chisholm; (England) **Chandler Cunningham-South**; (England) **Alex Dombrandt**; (Wales) Seb Driscoll; (England) Will Evans; (England) Jack Kenningham; (England) Lucas Schmid; **Scrum-halves**: (England) Will Porter; (England) Stu Townsend; **Fly-halves**: (England) Josh Bellamy; (England) **Marcus Smith** (Note: Marcus Smith is jointly contracted with the RFU, via an enhanced England Elite Player Squad (EPS) contract.); (England) Connor Slevin	**Centres**: (England) **Oscar Beard**; (Wales) Bryn Bradley; (England) Sean Kerr; (Scotland) Ludo Kolade; (England) **Luke Northmore**; (England) Ben Waghorn; **Wings**: (England) Cassius Cleaves; (England) Nick David; (Argentina) **Rodrigo Isgró**; (England) Frank McMillan; (England) **Cadan Murley**; (Zimbabwe) **Edward Sigauke**; **Fullbacks**: (Scotland) Cameron Anderson; (England) **George Furbank** (Note: George Furbank is jointly contracted with the RFU, via an enhanced England Elite Player Squad (EPS) contract.); (South Africa) Tyrone Green
**(c)** denotes the team captain. **Bold** denotes internationally capped players. Source:

=== Academy squad ===
The Harlequins academy squad is:

Harlequins 2026–27 Senior Academy squad
**Props**: (England) Josh Andrews; (England) Sam Bland; (England) Jamie Miller; (England) Jago Morgan; (England) Ollie Streeter; **Hooker**: (England) Jerold Gorleku; (England) Ashton Graham; (England) Jimmy Staples	**Second row**: (England) Jack Beswick; (Fiji) Marley Chandra; (England) Henry Laidlow; **Back row**: (England) Leo Dickinson; (England) Jack Kemp; (England) Kaiden Watson; (England) Elliot Williams; (England) Tate Williams; **Scrum-halves**: (Australia) Alfie Bowman; (England) Lucas Friday; (England) Max Rawlinson; **Fly-halves**: (England) Sam Marshall	**Centres**: (England) Finlay Cunnison; (England) Jack Tyler; **Wings**: (England) Theo Povey; **Fullbacks**: (England) Ben Perkins; (England) Sean Sharp
Italics denotes U20 international. Source:

== Club staff ==
Rugby Department

Role	Name
General Manager	(England) Andrew Sanger

First Team Coaching

Role	Name
Head Coach	(Australia) Jason Gilmore
Attack and backs Coach	(New Zealand) Nick Evans
Scrum and transition coach	(Wales) Adam Jones
Skills and transition coach	(Ireland) Gerrard Mullen
Lead rugby transition coach	(England) Matt Ferguson

Academy

Role	Name
Academy Manager	(England) Chim Gale
Academy Coach Development Manager	(England) Gary Street
Academy Coach	(England) Jim Evans
Academy Coach	(England) Jordan Turner-Hall

== Notable former players ==
=== Lions Tourists ===
The following Harlequins players have been selected for the Lions tours while at the club:

- Alex Palmer (1910 Tour to Argentina)
- Horace Evelyn Ward (1910 Tour to Argentina)
- Jim Reeve (1930)
- Pop Dunkley (1936)
- Robin Prescott (1936)
- Phil Davies (1955)
- J. R. C. Young (1959)
- David Marques (1959)
- Bob Hiller (1968 & 1971)
- Stack Stevens (1971)
- Peter Dixon (1971)
- Will Carling (1989 & 1993)
- Paul Ackford (1989)
- Jason Leonard (1993, 1997 & 2001)
- Brian Moore (1993)
- Peter Winterbottom (1993)
- Keith Wood (1997 & 2001)
- Will Greenwood (2001 & 2005)
- Ugo Monye (2009)
- Joe Marler (2017)
- Kyle Sinckler (2017)
- Marcus Smith (2021 & 2025)

=== Rugby World Cup ===
The following are players which have represented their countries at the Rugby World Cup while playing for Harlequins (tournament winners are listed in bold):

Tournament	Players selected	England players	Other national team players
1987	2	Jamie Salmon, Marcus Rose	
1991	7	Brian Moore, Jason Leonard, Paul Ackford, Michael Skinner, Peter Winterbottom, Will Carling (c), Simon Halliday	**Troy Coker** (Australia)
1995	4	Brian Moore, Jason Leonard, Will Carling (c)	Jim Staples (Ireland)
1999	3	Jason Leonard	Gareth Llewellyn (Wales) , Luke Gross (United States)
2003	4	**Jason Leonard**, **Will Greenwood**	Schalk van der Merwe (Namibia) , Norman Ligairi (Fiji)
2007	4	Nick Easter, Andy Gomarsall	Tani Fuga, Steven So'oialo (Samoa)
2011	3	Nick Easter	Tomás Vallejos (Argentina) , Maurie Fa'asavalu (Samoa)
2015	8	Joe Marler, Chris Robshaw (c), Nick Easter, Danny Care, Mike Brown	Netani Talei (Fiji) , Jamie Roberts (Wales) , Tim Visser (Scotland)
2019	7	Joe Marler, Kyle Sinckler	Michele Campagnaro (Italy) , Paul Lasike (United States) , Tevita Cavubati, Semi Kunatani, Vereniki Goneva (Fiji)
2023	7	Jack Walker, Joe Marler, Danny Care, Marcus Smith	Dino Lamb (Italy) , **André Esterhuizen** (South Africa) , Dillon Lewis (Wales)

=== Club captains ===
The following players have held the position of club captain since rugby union in England turned professional in 1995.

- 1994–1995 (England) - Brian Moore
- 1995–1997 (England) - Jason Leonard
- 1997–1998 (Ireland) - Keith Wood
- 1998–1999 (New Zealand) - Zinzan Brooke
- 1999–2000 (England) - Will Carling
- 2000–2001 (Australia) - David Wilson
- 2001–2002 (Australia) - Garrick Morgan
- 2002–2006 (South Africa) - André Vos
- 2006–2008 (England) - Paul Volley
- 2008–2010 (England) - Will Skinner
- 2010–2014 (England) - Chris Robshaw
- 2014–2015 (England) - Joe Marler
- 2015–2017 (England) - Danny Care
- 2017–2018 (Australia) - James Horwill
- 2018–2020 (England) - Chris Robshaw (Note: Though Chris Robshaw and James Horwill were officially co-captains for the 2018–19 season, Robshaw is generally recognised as club captain for this period given his greater seniority within the side)
- 2020–2024 (South Africa) - Stephan Lewies
- 2024– (England) - Alex Dombrandt

== See also ==
- Rugby union in London
- Harlequins Women
