= Dick Best =

English rugby union coach and journalist

Dick Best (born 22 September 1954) is a former rugby union player, coach, and current journalist.

Dick Best was born in the East End of London. He started playing rugby at school and then was invited to play Harlequins at the age of 18. He stayed with Harlequins for around 25 years.

He coached the England national team from after their defeat in the Rugby World Cup Final in 1991 until August 1994. England won 13 and lost four (two by a single point) of the 17 games played when Best was their coach. This included winning the Grand Slam in 1992. He also coached the England A and Sevens teams.

He was a coach on the 1993 British Lions tour to New Zealand.

After coaching England, Dick Best coached Harlequins for a couple of seasons, saving them from relegation. They finished third the following season and were in the semi-finals of the Pilkington Cup, until he was controversially sacked in May 1997.

Best was Director of Rugby at London Irish until he was sacked on 5th April, 2001.

He later became an agent and an occasional coach, including at Swansea, Western Province, Southend RFC.
