= Ben Clarke =

British Lions & England international rugby union player

- Born: Benjamin Bevan Clarke; 15 April 1968 (age 58) Bishop's Stortford, Hertfordshire, England
- Height: 1.97 m (6 ft 6 in)
- Weight: 113 kg (17 st 11 lb)
- School: The Bishop's Stortford College
- University: The Royal Agricultural College (Cirencester)
- Occupation: Money broker

Rugby union career
- Position: Back Row
Amateur team(s)
Years	Team	Apps	(Points)
?-1992	Bishop's Stortford		
–	Saracens F.C.		
Senior career
Years	Team	Apps	(Points)
1992-1996	Bath Rugby		
1996-1998	Richmond F.C.		
1998-2001	Bath Rugby		
2001-2002	Worcester Warriors		
International career
Years	Team	Apps	(Points)
1992-1999	England	40	
1993	British and Irish Lions	3	

Ben Clarke (born 15 April 1968), is a former England back-row international rugby union player.

== Biography ==
Educated at Bishop's Stortford College, Clarke played for Bath Rugby from 1992 to 1996, before joining Richmond F.C. as the first £1-million player. He returned to Bath in 2000 for a second spell as captain, before knee injuries reduced his appearances and he left the club for a second time, joining Worcester Warriors as player/coach in 2001.

Clarke first played for England in November 1992 v South Africa.

Clarke toured New Zealand in 1993 with the British and Irish Lions. He had an excellent tour and was voted player of the tour.

Clarke later worked as a money broker for BGC Partners. He worked there alongside Peter Winterbottom, until Winterbottom left in 2008.

== See also ==
1993 British and Irish Lions tour to New Zealand
