= Andrew Harriman =

England international rugby union player

Andy Harriman
- Born: Andrew Tuoyo Harriman; 13 July 1964 (age 62) Lagos, Nigeria
- Height: 6 ft 1 in (1.85 m)
- Weight: 12 st 7 lb (80 kg)
- School: Radley College
- University: Cambridge University

Rugby union career
- Position: Wing
Amateur team(s)
Years	Team	Apps	(Points)
- Cambridge University
–	Harlequins		
International career
Years	Team	Apps	(Points)
1988	England	1	(0)
National sevens team
Years	Team		Comps
1993	England		1993 RWC 7s

Andrew Tuoyo Harriman (born 13 July 1964) is a Nigerian born rugby union player who played as a wing for Harlequins and was capped for England as a full international. He was prominent as an exponent of the sevens game, including leading England to victory at the 1993 Rugby World Cup Sevens.

== Early life ==
Harriman was born in Lagos, Nigeria. He was educated at Radley College and Magdalene College at Cambridge University where he was a blue in both rugby and athletics in 1985.

== Rugby career ==
Harriman was known as one of the quickest and most exciting runners of his generation. He scored a vital try when Harlequins won the Pilkington Cup against Northampton in May 1991. This was a repeat of his try scoring in the 1988 final when Harlequins lifted the cup, after having defeated Bristol.

In 1988 he won his only cap against the touring Australians, which England won 28-19, and then played for England 'B' against the Emerging Australians, France, and Italy. In 1991 he had an outstanding season scoring 18 tries in 19 appearances for Harlequins.

== Rugby sevens ==
Harriman was an exceptional exponent of the sevens game. He appeared for Harlequins in three Middlesex finals prior to 1992. In the 1991 event he scored seven tries in four ties.

He played for and captained England in their victorious campaign in the inaugural Rugby World Cup Sevens in 1993, scoring two tries in the semifinal against Fiji and another try in the final against Australia. He also represented the Barbarians in the Hong Kong sevens tournament in 1991, during which he scored memorable tries in the quarterfinal against Australia and the semifinal against Fiji.

== After rugby ==
Harriman is now a London-based property developer.
