= Paul Ackford =

English rugby union player

- Born: 26 February 1958 (age 68) Hanover, West Germany
- Height: 1.98 m (6 ft 6 in)
- Weight: 112 kg (247 lb)

Rugby union career
- Position: Lock
International career
| Years | Team | Apps | (Points) |
| 1988-1991 | England | 25 | (4) |

Paul Ackford (born 26 February 1958) is an English former rugby union international who played lock forward. He was formerly an inspector in the Metropolitan Police and a columnist for The Telegraph.

== Early life ==
Ackford was born in Hanover, West Germany.

== Education ==
Ackford was educated at Plymouth College, the University of Kent (BA) and Cambridge University (MA). He played lock for England B aged 21 and represented Cambridge in the 1979 Varsity Match, but did not make an impact until joining Harlequins and the Police in 1983.

== Rugby career ==
After impressing for the London Division against the touring Wallabies, Ackford made his England debut on 5 November 1988 against Australia, aged 30.

Partnering police constable Wade Dooley, Ackford became an important part of the new side captained by Will Carling. He went on the 1989 Lions Tour to Australia, where he played in all three tests.

In 1990 he was knocked unconscious when blindsided by the young Argentine front row forward Federico Mendez, which saw Mendez sent off. Mendez later claimed it was a case of mistaken identity, and that he had meant to hit Jeff Probyn, because he had "stamped on my goolies". Ackford was part of the England side that won the Five Nations Grand Slam in 1991.

== Post-rugby career ==
Ackford retired from international rugby after the 1991 World Cup, won by Australia, becoming a journalist and writing for the Sunday Telegraph.
