= Peter Winterbottom =

British Lions & England international rugby union player

- Born: Peter James Winterbottom; 31 May 1960 (age 66) Otley, West Yorkshire
- Height: 1.83 m (6 ft 0 in)
- Weight: 94 kg (14 st 11 lb; 207 lb)
- School: Rossall School

Rugby union career
- Position: Flanker
Senior career
Years	Team	Apps	(Points)
- Headingley
- Hawkes Bay
1988–1993	Harlequins		
1982-1990	Barbarians	8	
International career
Years	Team	Apps	(Points)
1982–1993	England	58	(13)
1983, 1993	British and Irish Lions	7	

Peter James Winterbottom MBE (born 31 May 1960 in Otley, West Yorkshire), is an English former rugby union player who played as an openside flanker. He was England's most-capped openside (with 58 caps) until being overtaken by Neil Back in 2003. He made his England debut on 2 January 1982 against Australia, and his final appearance on 20 March 1993 against Ireland.

Winterbottom was selected for two British and Irish Lions tours in 1983 and 1993, both to New Zealand, where he impressed the locals with his fine play, albeit on losing sides. Overall, he played 19 games for the Lions including 7 tests and scored one try. He was the second England player to reach 50 caps, after Rory Underwood, and was inducted onto the Twickenham "Wall of Fame" in November 2005.

Winterbottom played club rugby for Headingley, Harlequins and also played provincial rugby for Hawkes Bay in New Zealand and Transvaal in South Africa

== After rugby ==
Since his playing career ended, Winterbottom carved out a career in finance. He worked as a corporate bond broker for Tullett & Tokyo Ltd and BGC Partners alongside Ben Clarke.

Winterbottom served as Director of Rugby at Esher RFC between 2019 and 2025.

== Personal life ==
Winterbottom is the uncle of James Leuzinger, who represented Great Britain at the 2006 Winter Olympics.
