= Michael Skinner (rugby union) =

England international rugby union player

- Full name: Michael Gordon Skinner
- Born: 26 November 1958 (age 67) Newcastle-upon-Tyne, England
- School: Walbottle Grammar School

Rugby union career
- Position: Flanker
International career
Years	Team	Apps	(Points)
1988–92	England	21	(12)

Michael Gordon Skinner (born 26 November 1958), usually known as Mickey or Mick, is a former English rugby union player who played at flanker for Harlequins, Blackheath and England. He was nicknamed "Mick the Munch" because of his strong tackling. He was born in Newcastle-Upon-Tyne and attended Walbottle Grammar School.

== Career ==
Prior to making his England debut Skinner was required as a late addition to the England squad for the inaugural World Cup in 1987. The R.F.U. could not locate him, which prompted an appeal from Desmond Lynam live on the BBC's Grandstand programme for Skinner to get in touch as his services were required.

Skinner won 21 caps for England. He made his England debut on 16 January 1988 in England's 10–9 defeat to France in Paris during the Five Nations. Skinner was known for a tackle on Marc Cecillon in England's 1991 Rugby World Cup quarter final against France in Paris. The match, which England won 19–10, was one of the most brutal in World Cup history. His final game for England was on 7 March 1992 against Wales at Twickenham as part of the Five Nations tournament.

== Retirement ==
Since leaving the game, Skinner has worked as a media pundit and became famous amongst fans for his interesting choices of waistcoat. He also featured in a video in which he introduces some of rugby's best tackles. He is an active supporter of Wooden Spoon charity.

== Personal life ==
He has four children, including Zak.
